= 2005 Toronto Argonauts season =

CFL team season

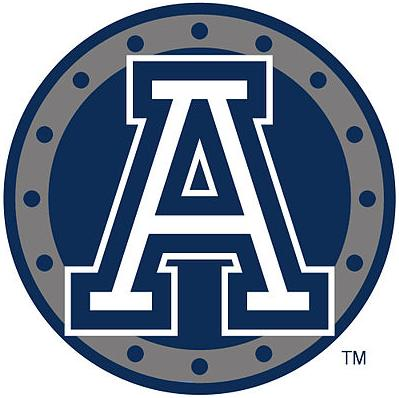
- Head coach: Michael Clemons
- Home stadium: Rogers Centre

Results
- Record: 11–7
- Division place: 1st, East
- Playoffs: Lost East Final

Uniform

The 2005 Toronto Argonauts season was the 48th season for the team in the Canadian Football League (CFL) and 133rd season overall. The Argonauts finished the regular season 11–7 and finished in first place in the East Division.

== Offseason ==
=== CFL draft ===
Pick #	CFL team	Player	Position	College
9	Toronto Argonauts	Nick Kaczur	OL	Toledo
11	Toronto Argonauts	Raymond Fontaine	LB	Kentucky
14	Toronto Argonauts	Phillipe Audet	DL	Laval
18	Toronto Argonauts	Jeff Keeping	OT	Western Ontario
35	Toronto Argonauts	Tye Smith	OL	Manitoba
44	Toronto Argonauts	Bryan Crawford	RB	Queen's
53	Toronto Argonauts	Ian Forde	RB	Waterloo

== Preseason ==
Week	Date	Opponent	Location	Final score	Attendance	Record
A	June 11	Tiger-Cats	Huskies Stadium	T 16 – 16	11,148	0–0–1
B	June 17	@ Tiger-Cats	Ivor Wynne Stadium	W 34 – 31	24,582	1–0–1

== Regular season ==
=== Season schedule ===
Week	Date	Opponent	Location	Final score	Attendance	Record
1	June 25	Lions	Rogers Centre	L 27 – 20	30,712	0–1
2	July 1	@ Stampeders	McMahon Stadium	W 22 – 16	34,102	1–1
3	July 9	Roughriders	Rogers Centre	W 27 – 26	26,218	2–1
4	July 15	@ Lions	BC Place Stadium	L 30 – 22	29,217	2–2
5	Bye					
6	July 28	@ Alouettes	Molson Stadium	W 36 – 24	20,202	3–2
6	August 1	Blue Bombers	Rogers Centre	W 34 – 27	27,214	4–2
7	Bye					
8	August 12	Alouettes	Rogers Centre	L 18 – 10	31,621	4–3
9	August 20	@ Eskimos	Commonwealth Stadium	W 22 – 18	38,927	5–3
10	August 24	Stampeders	Rogers Centre	W 25 – 16	24,637	6–3
11	September 5	@ Tiger-Cats	Ivor Wynne Stadium	L 33 – 30	29,600	6–4
12	September 10	Tiger-Cats	Rogers Centre	W 48 – 0	32,274	7–4
13	Bye					
14	September 23	@ Roughriders	Taylor Field	L 24 – 13	22,779	7–5
15	September 28	Renegades	Rogers Centre	W 29 – 18	24,886	8–5
16	October 10	Eskimos	Rogers Centre	L 17 – 13	34,116	8–6
17	October 16	@ Blue Bombers	Canad Inns Stadium	W 35 – 32	22,323	9–6
18	October 22	@ Alouettes	Olympic Stadium	W 49 – 23	51,269	10–6
19	October 27	Tiger-Cats	Rogers Centre	W 34 – 11	40,085	11–6
20	November 5	@ Renegades	Frank Clair Stadium	L 27 – 17	16,504	11–7

=== Season standings ===
East Division
Pos	Team	Pld	W	L	T	PF	PA	PD	Pts
1	Toronto Argonauts (C, Q)	18	11	7	0	486	387	+99	22
2	Montreal Alouettes (Q)	18	10	8	0	592	519	+73	20
3	Ottawa Renegades	18	7	11	0	458	578	−120	14
4	Hamilton Tiger-Cats	18	5	13	0	383	583	−200	10

(C) First round bye; (Q) Qualified for playoffs

== Postseason ==
Round	Date	Opponent	Location	Final score	Attendance
East Final	November 20	Alouettes	Rogers Centre	L 33–17	44,211

== Roster ==
2005 Toronto Argonauts final roster
Quarterbacks: 9 Damon Allen; 7 Michael Bishop; 16 Charlie Peterson; Running backs: 40 Bryan Crawford; 33 Jeff Johnson; 11 John Williams; Receivers: 88 Robert Baker; 5 Arland Bruce; 15 Tony Miles; 77 Michael Palmer; 18 R. Jay Soward; 4 Andre Talbot	Offensive linemen: 68 Dave Costa T/G; 65 Jerome Davis T; 56 Chad Folk C; 62 Jonathan Landon T; 59 Mike Mihelic G; 66 Jude St. John G; 69 Bernard Williams T; Defensive linemen: 97 Jonathan Brown DE; 92 Noah Cantor DT; 95 Eric England DT; 98 Riall Johnson DE; 90 Chuck Walsh DE/DT; Special teams: 1 Noel Prefontaine K/P	Linebackers: 35 Kevin Eiben; 2 Michael Fletcher; 36 Ray Mariuz; 50 Mike O'Shea; 45 Randy Srochenski; Defensive backs: 37 Mike Crumb; 8 Chris Hardy; 13 Clifford Ivory; 23 Bashir Levingston; 17 Derrick Lewis; 12 Adrion Smith; 21 Orlondo Steinauer; 30 Kenny Wheaton; 32 Chuck Winters; 26 Jordan Younger	Injured list: 47 Philippe Audet DE; 20 John Avery RB; 10 Antonious Bonner LB; 57 Jeff Keeping C/G; 25 Sean Millington RB; 28 Byron Parker DB; 91 Karon Riley DT; 34 Jarrett Smith RB; Italics indicate International player

== Awards and records ==
- Damon Allen, CFL Outstanding Player Award
- Michael Fletcher, James P. McCaffrey Trophy

=== CFL All-Stars: Offence ===
- QB – Damon Allen

=== CFL All-Stars: Defence ===
- DE – Jonathan Brown
- LB – Michael Fletcher
- LB – Kevin Eiben
- CB – Jordan Younger

=== CFL Eastern All-Stars: Offence ===
- QB – Damon Allen
- SB – Arland Bruce III
- OG – Jude St. John
- OT – Bernard Williams

=== CFL Eastern All-Stars: Defence ===
- DE – Jonathan Brown
- LB – Michael Fletcher
- LB – Kevin Eiben
- CB – Adrion Smith
- CB – Jordan Younger
- DB – Kenny Wheaton

=== CFL Eastern All-Stars: Special teams ===
- P – Noel Prefontaine
- K – Noel Prefontaine
