= 2005 Saskatchewan Roughriders season =

CFL team season

- General manager: Roy Shivers
- Head coach: Danny Barrett
- Home stadium: Taylor Field

Results
- Record: 9–9
- Division place: 4th, West
- Playoffs: Lost East Semi-Final
- Team MOP: Corey Holmes
- Team MOC: Scott Schultz
- Team MOR: T. J. Stancil

Uniform

The 2005 Saskatchewan Roughriders finished in fourth place in the West Division with a 9–9 record. They crossed over to the east and appeared in the East Semi-Final where they lost to the Montreal Alouettes.

== Offseason ==
=== CFL draft ===
Round	Pick	Player	Position	School/Club team
1	3	Matt O'Meara	Offensive tackle	McMaster
1	4	Chris Best	Offensive lineman	Duke
1	7	Nathan Hoffart	Slotback	Saskatchewan
3	21	Matt Kudu	Defensive lineman	Eastern Michigan
4	30	J.O. Gagnon-Gordillo	Defensive Lineman	Eastern Michigan
5	39	Dustin Cherniawski	Defensive back	British Columbia
6	48	Ryan Gottselig	Defensive Lineman	Saskatchewan

=== Preseason ===
Week	Date	Opponent	Score	Result	Attendance
A	Tues, June 7	at Calgary Stampeders	18–14	Loss	24,700
A	Sun, June 12	vs. BC Lions	37–23	Loss	25,771

== Regular season ==
=== Season standings ===
West Division
Pos	Team	Pld	W	L	T	PF	PA	PD	Pts
1	BC Lions (C, Q)	18	12	6	0	550	444	+106	24
2	Calgary Stampeders (Q)	18	11	7	0	529	443	+86	22
3	Edmonton Eskimos (Q)	18	11	7	0	453	421	+32	22
4	Saskatchewan Roughriders (Q)	18	9	9	0	441	433	+8	18
5	Winnipeg Blue Bombers	18	5	13	0	474	558	−84	10

Source: "2005 Regular Season Standings". Canadian Football League. Archived from the original on 2008-09-21.
(C) First round bye; (Q) Qualified for playoffs

=== Season schedule ===
Week	Date	Opponent	Score	Result	Attendance	Record
1	Sat, June 25	vs. Winnipeg Blue Bombers	42–15	Win	23,067	1–0
2	Sat, July 2	at Hamilton Tiger-Cats	23–21	Win	29,032	2–0
3	Sat, July 9	at Toronto Argonauts	27–26	Loss	26,218	2–1
4	Sun, July 17	vs. Hamilton Tiger-Cats	32–13	Win	23,421	3–1
5	Sat, July 23	at Calgary Stampeders	44–18	Loss	35,652	3–2
6	Fri, July 29	vs. Ottawa Renegades	21–16	Loss	25,198	3–3
7	Thurs, Aug 4	at Montreal Alouettes	42–13	Loss	20,202	3–4
8	Thurs, Aug 11	at Ottawa Renegades	22–17	Loss	20,607	3–5
9	Bye					
10	Sat, Aug 27	vs. BC Lions	19–15	Loss	24,899	3–6
11	Sun, Sept 4	vs. Winnipeg Blue Bombers	45–26	Win	28,800	4–6
12	Sat, Sept 10	at Winnipeg Blue Bombers	19–17	Win	29,653	5–6
13	Sun, Sept 18	vs. Edmonton Eskimos	37–36	Win	25,226	6–6
14	Fri, Sept 23	vs. Toronto Argonauts	24–13	Win	22,779	7–6
15	Sat, Oct 1	at BC Lions	28–19	Win	34,711	8–6
16	Sat, Oct 8	vs. Montreal Alouettes	38–34	Loss	26,900	8–7
17	Sat, Oct 15	at Edmonton Eskimos	19–18	Loss	53,216	8–8
18	Sun, Oct 23	vs. Calgary Stampeders	29–21	Loss	28,800	8–9
19	Bye					
20	Sat, Nov 5	at BC Lions	13–12	Win	38,847	9–9

# Games played with primary home uniforms.
# Games played with primary white uniforms.
# Games played with black uniforms.

== Roster ==
2005 Saskatchewan Roughriders final roster
Quarterbacks: 12 Ian Butler; 8 Marcus Crandell; 15 Nealon Greene; Running backs: 27 Dominique Dorsey; 19 Corey Holmes; 33 Chris Szarka; Receivers: 87 Jason French; 2 Corey Grant; 83 Travis Moore; 89 Jamel Richardson; 84 Elijah Thurmon; 82 Ibrahim Tounkara	Offensive linemen: 69 Freddie Childress G; 68 Andrew Greene G; 66 Rob Lazeo C/G; 60 Gene Makowsky T; 54 Jeremy O'Day C; 53 Charles Thomas T; Defensive linemen: 98 Nathan Davis DT; 46 Kitwana Jones DE; 47 Dwayne LeFall DE; 95 Luc Mullinder DT; 41 Fred Perry DE; 96 Scott Schultz DT; 99 Wayne Weathers DE	Linebackers: 50 Steve Glenn; 9 Reggie Hunt; 45 Mike McCullough; 24 Jackie Mitchell; 41 Walter Spencer; 13 T. J. Stancil; Defensive backs: 5 Davin Bush; 22 Dustin Cherniawski; 29 Eddie Davis; 11 Darnell Edwards; 26 Scott Gordon; 1 LaDouphyous McCalla; 3 Omarr Morgan; 20 Kennedy Nkeyasen	Special teams: 4 Paul McCallum K/P; Injured list: 85 Karsten Bailey WR; 7 Daved Benefield DE; 88 Matt Dominguez WR; 77 Dwan Epps DE; 59 Jocelyn Frenette C/G; 32 Neal Hughes RB; 79 Terrell Jurineack DE; 28 Kenton Keith RB; 65 Tango McCauley G; 67 Matt O'Meara G/T; 48 Trevis Smith LB; Italics indicate American player

== Awards and records ==
- CFL's Most Outstanding Offensive Lineman Award – Gene Makowsky
- Jeff Nicklin Memorial Trophy – Corey Holmes (RB)

=== CFL All-Star selections ===
- Eddie Davis, Defensive Back
- Andrew Greene, Offensive Guard
- Corey Holmes, Special Teams
- Gene Makowsky, Offensive Tackle
- Omarr Morgan, Cornerback
- Scott Schultz, Defensive Tackle

=== Western All-Star selections ===
- Eddie Davis, Defensive Back
- Andrew Greene, Offensive Guard
- Corey Holmes, Special Teams
- Gene Makowsky, Offensive Tackle
- Omarr Morgan, Cornerback
- Scott Schultz, Defensive Tackle
- Elijah Thurmon, Wide Receiver

== Playoffs ==
=== East Semi-Final ===
Team	Q1	Q2	Q3	Q4	Total
Saskatchewan Roughriders	0	0	7	7	14
Montreal Alouettes	7	17	3	3	30
