= 2005 BC Lions season =

Canadian football team season

- Owner: David Braley
- General manager: Wally Buono
- President: Bob Ackles
- Head coach: Wally Buono
- Home stadium: BC Place Stadium

Results
- Record: 12–6
- Division place: 1st, West
- Playoffs: Lost West Final

Uniform

The 2005 BC Lions finished in first place in the West Division with a 12–6 record. They appeared in the West Final.

== Offseason ==
=== CFL draft ===
Rd	Pick	Player	Position	School
1	8	Alexis Bwenge	RB	Kentucky
2	17	Pierre Tremblay	OL	Laval
3	25	David Lowry	LB	Calgary
3	26	Patick Pierre-Louis	LB	UCLA
4	34	Sebastian Clovis	DB	St. Mary's
5	43	Nuvraj Bassi	DT	Oregon
6	52	Karl Ortmanns	OL	Acadia

== Preseason ==
Week	Date	Opponent	Score	Result	Attendance	Record
A	June 12	@ Saskatchewan Roughriders	37–23	Win	25,771	1–0
B	June 16	vs. Calgary Stampeders	31–16	Win	23,753	2–0

== Regular season ==
=== Season standings ===
West Division
Team	GP	W	L	T	PF	PA	Pts	
BC Lions	18	12	6	0	550	444	24	Details
Calgary Stampeders	18	11	7	0	529	443	22	Details
Edmonton Eskimos	18	11	7	0	453	421	22	Details
Saskatchewan Roughriders	18	9	9	0	441	433	18	Details
Winnipeg Blue Bombers	18	5	13	0	474	558	10	Details

=== Season schedule ===
Week	Date	Opponent	Score	Result	Attendance	Record
1	June 25	@ Toronto Argonauts	27–20	Win	30,712	1–0
2	Bye					1–0
3	July 8	vs. Ottawa Renegades	37–29	Win	27,506	2–0
4	July 15	vs. Toronto Argonauts	30–22	Win	29,217	3–0
5	July 23	@ Hamilton Tiger-Cats	28–22	Win	27,692	4–0
6	July 29	vs. Calgary Stampeders	40–27	Win	28,714	5–0
7	Aug 5	vs. Edmonton Eskimos	25–19	Win	35,568	6–0
8	Aug 12	@ Calgary Stampeders	39–31	Win	31,847	7–0
9	Aug 19	vs. Hamilton Tiger-Cats	39–15	Win	33,119	8–0
10	Aug 27	@ Saskatchewan Roughriders	19–15	Win	24,899	9–0
11	Bye					9–0
12	Sept 8	@ Ottawa Renegades	61–27	Win	19,013	10–0
13	Sept 17	vs. Montreal Alouettes	27–26	Win	36,066	11–0
14	Sept 24	@ Edmonton Eskimos	37–20	Loss	48,048	11–1
15	Oct 1	vs. Saskatchewan Roughriders	28–19	Loss	34,711	11–2
16	Oct 10	@ Winnipeg Blue Bombers	44–23	Loss	22,630	11–3
17	Oct 16	@ Montreal Alouettes	46–44	Loss	20,202	11–4
18	Oct 22	vs. Winnipeg Blue Bombers	41–1	Win	29,780	12–4
19	Oct 28	@ Edmonton Eskimos	22–19	Loss	37,544	12–5
20	Nov 5	vs. Saskatchewan Roughriders	13–12	Loss	38,847	12–6

== Player stats ==
=== Passing ===
Player	Att.	Comp	%	Yards	TD	INT	Rating
Dave Dickenson	342	253	74.0	3338	21	5	118.8
Casey Printers	216	131	60.6	1671	9	6	87.2
Buck Pierce	71	43	60.6	679	3	1	100.6
Jarious Jackson	6	3	50.0	30	0	0	64.6
Jason Crumb	1	0	0.0	0	0	0	2.1

=== Rushing ===
Player	Att.	Yards	Avg.	TD	Fumbles
Antonio Warren	205	983	4.8	13	7
Casey Printers	38	336	8.8	2	2
Dave Dickenson	49	299	6.1	3	1
Buck Pierce	15	104	6.9	2	0
Lyle Green	12	53	4.4	0	0

=== Receiving ===
Player	No.	Yards	Avg.	Long	TD
Geroy Simon	89	1322	14.9	83	10
Jason Clermont	78	1042	13.4	69	4
Ryan Thelwell	74	1035	14.0	75	7
Antonio Warren	68	718	10.6	42	3
Paris Jackson	48	617	12.9	40	4

== Awards and records ==
- Brent Johnson (DE), – CFL's Most Outstanding Canadian Award

=== 2005 CFL All-Stars ===
- Brent Johnson, defensive end

=== Western Division All-Star Selections ===
- Ryan Thelwell, Wide Receiver
- Otis Floyd, Linebacker
- Brent Johnson, defensive end
- Barron Miles, Safety

== Playoffs ==
=== Scotiabank West Championship ===
Team	Q1	Q2	Q3	Q4	Total
Edmonton Eskimos	14	7	0	7	28
BC Lions	3	7	11	2	23

VANCOUVER – On the heels of his benching against Calgary, it seemed likely that Edmonton head coach Danny Maciocia would leave Ricky Ray as the backup for the West final against the BC Lions. However, Maciocia said mid-week that Ray would start, leaving Jason Maas remaining as the backup. In BC, Dave Dickenson unsurprisingly got the start over former Most Outstanding Player Casey Printers, leading some to joke that four of the CFL's best quarterbacks would be in this game.

== Roster ==
2005 BC Lions final roster
Quarterbacks: 12 Dave Dickenson; 16 Buck Pierce; 1 Casey Printers; Running backs: 36 Jason Gavadza; 28 Lyle Green; 34 Antonio Warren; Receivers: 8 Bret Anderson K; 82 Jason Clermont; 19 Paris Jackson; 84 Aaron Lockett; 83 Jerel Myers; 81 Geroy Simon; 3 Ryan Thelwell	Offensive linemen: 59 Kelly Bates G; 65 Mo Elewonibi G/T; 55 Sherko Haji-Rasouli T; 68 Cory Mantyka T; 64 Angus Reid C; 62 Bobby Singh G; Defensive linemen: 95 Frank Ferrara DT; 97 Brent Johnson DE; 91 Nautyn McKay-Loescher DE/DT; 96 Tyrone Williams DT; 90 Chris Wilson DE; Special teams: 13 Mark McLoughlin K; 7 Duncan O'Mahony K/P	Linebackers: 45 Tyson Craiggs; 35 Otis Floyd; 6 Javier Glatt; 39 Jamall Johnson; 26 Carl Kidd; 51 Barrin Simpson; Defensive backs: 10 Jason Crumb; 31 Dante Marsh; 9 Barron Miles; 21 Ryan Phillips; 24 Tony Tiller; 23 Mark Washington; 14 James Whitley; 2 Sam Young	Injured list: 4 JoJuan Armour LB; 67 Carl Gourgues G; 54 Chris Hoople LB; 18 Jarious Jackson QB; 27 Eddie Linscomb RB; 33 Kelly Lochbaum LB; 88 Tony Simmons WR; Italics indicate International player
