= 2005 Winnipeg Blue Bombers season =

Professional Canadian football team

- Head coach: Jim Daley
- Home stadium: Canad Inns Stadium

Results
- Record: 5–13
- Division place: 5th, West
- Playoffs: did not qualify

Uniform

The 2005 Winnipeg Blue Bombers finished in fifth place in the West Division with a 5–13 record and failed to make the playoffs.

== Offseason ==
=== CFL draft ===
Round	Pick	Player	Position	School/Club team
4	29	Scott Mennie	LB	Manitoba
5	38	Martin Lapostolle	DL	Indiana
6	47	Ryan Bisson	OL	Northwood

== Regular season ==
=== Season standings ===
West Division
Pos	Team	Pld	W	L	T	PF	PA	PD	Pts
1	BC Lions (C, Q)	18	12	6	0	550	444	+106	24
2	Calgary Stampeders (Q)	18	11	7	0	529	443	+86	22
3	Edmonton Eskimos (Q)	18	11	7	0	453	421	+32	22
4	Saskatchewan Roughriders (Q)	18	9	9	0	441	433	+8	18
5	Winnipeg Blue Bombers	18	5	13	0	474	558	−84	10

Source: "2005 Regular Season Standings". Canadian Football League. Archived from the original on 2008-09-21.
(C) First round bye; (Q) Qualified for playoffs

=== Season schedule ===
Week	Date	Opponent	Score	Result	Attendance	Record
1	June 25	at Saskatchewan Roughriders	42–15	Loss	23,067	0–1
2	June 30	vs. Edmonton Eskimos	27–8	Loss	22,087	0–2
3	July 7	vs. Calgary Stampeders	21–15	Loss	23,236	0–3
4	July 15	at Edmonton Eskimos	14–12	Loss	37,455	0–4
5	July 22	vs. Montreal Alouettes	51–46	Win	24,550	1–4
6	Aug 1	at Toronto Argonauts	34–27	Loss	27,214	1–5
7	Aug 6	at Calgary Stampeders	30–21	Loss	30,128	1–6
8	Aug 13	vs. Hamilton Tiger-Cats	44–14	Win	24,326	2–6
9	Aug 19	vs. Ottawa Renegades	38–17	Win	26,595	3–6
10	Aug 26	at Hamilton Tiger-Cats	41–39	Loss	27,443	3–7
11	Sept 4	at Saskatchewan Roughriders	45–26	Loss	28,800	3–8
12	Sept 10	vs. Saskatchewan Roughriders	19–17	Loss	29,653	3–9
13	Sept 16	at Ottawa Renegades	37–21	Win	17,567	4–9
14	Sept 25	at Montreal Alouettes	42–23	Loss	20,202	4–10
15	Bye					4–10
16	Oct 10	vs. BC Lions	44–23	Win	22,630	5–10
17	Oct 16	vs. Toronto Argonauts	35–32	Loss	22,323	5–11
18	Oct 22	at BC Lions	41–1	Loss	29,780	5–12
19	Oct 30	vs. Calgary Stampeders	46–24	Loss	23,455	5–13
20	Bye					5–13

== Roster ==
2005 Winnipeg Blue Bombers final roster
Quarterbacks: 5 Kevin Glenn; 12 Tee Martin; 8 Russ Michna; Running backs: 26 Graeme Bell; 34 Wade Miller; 21 Scott Regimbald; 1 Charles Roberts; Receivers: 84 Chris Brazzell; 81 Scott Robinson; 85 Milt Stegall; 88 Jamie Stoddard; 0 Keith Stokes	Offensive linemen: 67 Mike Abou-Mechrek G; 53 Corey Annett C; 59 Ryan Bachman T; 64 Dan Goodspeed T; 57 Jermese Jones T; 68 Marc Parenteau G; 54 Matt Sheridan G/C; Defensive linemen: 97 Doug Brown DT; 44 Tom Canada DE; 76 Joe Fleming DT; 99 Martin Lapostelle DT; 77 Jon Oosterhuis DT/DE; Special teams: 19 Chris Cvetkovic LS; 7 Troy Westwood K/P	Linebackers: 20 Ryan Folk; 36 Lamar McGriggs; 42 Neil McKinlay; 58 Scott Mennie; 15 Ron Ockimey; 52 Joe Tuipala; 37 Sean Woodson; Defensive backs: 23 Ike Charlton; 29 Justin Coleman; 4 Omar Evans; 2 William Fields; 18 Brad Franklin; 22 Shawn Gallant; 39 John Sullivan	Injured list: 32 Boyd Barrett DB; 16 Gilles Colon WR; 24 Ced Dickerson DB; 65 John Feugill T; 51 Aaron Fiacconi C; 62 Dan Gyetvai G; 9 Santino Hall DB; 3 Anthony Malbrough DB; 33 Cory Olynick FB; 10 Travis Ortega LB; 89 Chad Rempel WR; 14 Jon Ryan P; 16 Stanford Samuels DB; 98 Gavin Walls DE; 13 Spergon Wynn QB; Suspended: 23 Syniker Taylor DB; Italics indicate International player
