= 2005 Hamilton Tiger-Cats season =

Season of Canadian Football League team the Hamilton Tiger-Cats

- General manager: Ron Lancaster (0–6); Rob Katz (5–7)
- Head coach: Greg Marshall
- Home stadium: Ivor Wynne Stadium

Results
- Record: 5–13
- Division place: 4th, East
- Playoffs: Did not qualify
- Team MOP: D.J. Flick
- Team MOC: Agustin Barrenechea
- Team MOR: Jesse Lumsden

Uniform

The 2005 Hamilton Tiger-Cats season was the 48th season for the team in the Canadian Football League (CFL) and their 56th overall. The Tiger-Cats finished in fourth place in the East Division with a 5–13 record and missed the playoffs.

== Offseason ==
=== CFL draft ===
Rd	Pick	Player	Position	School
1	6	Jesse Lumsden	RB	McMaster
2	15	Fabio Filice	OL	McMaster
3	23	Francois Brochu	ST	Boston College
4	32	Jeremy Steeves	S	St. Francis Xavier
5	41	Iain Fleming	SB	Queen's
6	50	Andrew Paopao	DL	San Jose State

== Preseason ==
Week	Date	Opponent	Score	Result	Attendance	Record
A	June 2	at Toronto Argonauts (TA)	16–16	Tie	11,148	0–0–1
B	June 9	Toronto Argonauts	34–31	Loss	24,582	0–1–1

== Regular season ==
=== Season standings ===
East Division
Team	GP	W	L	T	PF	PA	Pts	
Toronto Argonauts	18	11	7	0	486	387	22	Details
Montreal Alouettes	18	10	8	0	592	519	20	Details
Ottawa Renegades	18	7	11	0	458	578	14	Details
Hamilton Tiger-Cats	18	5	13	0	383	583	10	Details

=== Season schedule ===
Week	Date	Opponent	Score	Result	Attendance	Record
1	June 22	at Montreal Alouettes	31–21	Loss	20,202	0–1
2	July 2	Saskatchewan Roughriders	23–21	Loss	29,032	0–2
3	Bye					
4	July 17	at Saskatchewan Roughriders	32–13	Loss	23,421	0–3
5	July 23	BC Lions	28–22	Loss	27,692	0–4
6	July 30	at Edmonton Eskimos	36–30	Loss	38,018	0–5
7	August 6	Ottawa Renegades	28–12	Loss	28,822	0–6
8	August 13	at Winnipeg Blue Bombers	44–14	Loss	24,326	0–7
9	August 19	at BC Lions	39–15	Loss	33,119	0–8
10	August 26	Winnipeg Blue Bombers	41–39	Win	27,433	1–8
11	Sept 5	Toronto Argonauts	33–30	Win	29,600	2–8
12	Sept 10	at Toronto Argonauts	48–0	Loss	32,274	2–9
13	Sept 17	Calgary Stampeders	39–17	Loss	27,821	2–10
14	Bye					
15	Sept 30	Edmonton Eskimos	40–14	Win	27,582	3–10
16	Oct 7	at Ottawa Renegades	43–21	Loss	19,069	3–11
17	Oct 14	at Calgary Stampeders	34–17	Loss	29,490	3–12
18	Oct 21	Ottawa Renegades	40–32	Win	26,912	4–12
19	Oct 27	at Toronto Argonauts	34–11	Loss	40,085	4–13
20	Nov 4	Montreal Alouettes	15–9	Win	27,114	5–13

== Roster ==
2005 Hamilton Tiger-Cats final roster
Quarterbacks: 7 Jon Beutjer; 12 Kevin Eakin; 14 Danny McManus; Running backs: 25 Kojo Aidoo; 27 Keith Burnell; 6 Howard Jackson; 28 Jesse Lumsden; Receivers: 82 D. J. Flick; 87 Kahlil Hill; 18 Mike Morreale; 88 Kamau Peterson; 80 Brock Ralph; 86 Steve Savoy; 4 Hugh Smith; 5 Craig Yeast	Offensive linemen: 52 Tim Bakker C/G/T; 64 Ryan Donnelly T; 60 Fabio Filice G; 68 Dave Hack T; 62 Marwan Hage C; 65 Mark Moroz G; 59 Wayne Smith G; Defensive linemen: 78 Adriano Belli DT; 49 Tim Cheatwood DE; 99 James Cotton DE; 70 Roger Dunbrack DT; 96 Hakeem Kashama DT; 94 DeVonte Peterson DE; 92 Demetrios Walker DE	Linebackers: 45 Chris Ball; 39 Agustín Barrenechea; 19 Sandy Beveridge; 42 Rob Hitchcock; Defensive backs: 11 Jykine Bradley; 4 Tay Cody; 27 Jason Goss; 20 Airabin Justin; 15 Tad Kornegay; 29 Chris Martin; 23 Alphonso Roundtree; 1 Wayne Shaw; Special teams: 30 Jamie Boreham K/P	Injured list: 9 Archie Amerson SB; 22 Imokhai Atogwe DB; 8 Marcus Brady QB; 57 Travis Claridge G; 24 Renard Cox DB; 96 Troy Cunningham DE; 81 Iain Fleming SB; 84 Dondre Gilliam WR; 16 Sidney Haugabrook DB; 55 Mat Petz LB; 33 Julian Radlein FB; 38 Matt Robichaud LB; 83 Taylor Stubblefield WR; 80 Steve Suter WR; Suspended: 69 Jonta Woodard T; Italics indicate American players

== Awards and records ==
=== 2005 CFL All-Stars ===
- Adriano Belli - DT

=== Eastern Division All-Star Selections ===
- Adriano Belli - DT
