= 2005 Edmonton Eskimos season =

Canadian football team season

- General manager: Paul Jones
- Head coach: Danny Maciocia
- Home stadium: Commonwealth Stadium

Results
- Record: 11–7
- Division place: 3rd, West
- Playoffs: Won Grey Cup
- Team MOP: Ricky Ray, QB
- Team MOC: Kelly Wiltshire, DB
- Team MOR: Tony Tompkins, WR/KR

Uniform

The 2005 Edmonton Eskimos finished third in the West Division with an 11–7 record and won the Grey Cup. This was the last season in their 34-year streak of making the playoffs.

== Offseason ==
=== CFL draft ===
Round	Pick	Player	Position	School/Club team
3	22	Timothy O'Neill	OL	Calgary
4	31	Anthony Posteraro	K/P	Graceland
5	40	Robert Leblanc	SB	McGill

=== Notable transactions ===
Date	Type	Incoming	Outgoing	Team
April 19, 2005	Trade	Joe Montford (DL)	Dan Comiskey (OL)	Hamilton Tiger-Cats
April 22, 2005	Trade	Sandy Annunziata (OL)	Future considerations	Toronto Argonauts
April 28, 2005	Trade	William Loftus (DB)	Terry Vaughn (SB); 6th round pick in 2005 CFL draft – Adam Eckert (WR)	Montreal Alouettes
July 31, 2005	Trade	Kwame Cavil (SB)	Clinton Wayne (DL)	Montreal Alouettes

== Preseason ==
=== Schedule ===
#	Date	Visitor	Score	Home	OT	Attendance	Record	Pts
A	June 10	Winnipeg Blue Bombers	20–20	Edmonton Eskimos		37,246	0–0–1	1
B	June 16	Edmonton Eskimos	10–3	Winnipeg Blue Bombers		28,013	1–0–1	3

== Regular season ==
=== Season standings ===
West Division
Pos	Team	Pld	W	L	T	PF	PA	PD	Pts
1	BC Lions (C, Q)	18	12	6	0	550	444	+106	24
2	Calgary Stampeders (Q)	18	11	7	0	529	443	+86	22
3	Edmonton Eskimos (Q)	18	11	7	0	453	421	+32	22
4	Saskatchewan Roughriders (Q)	18	9	9	0	441	433	+8	18
5	Winnipeg Blue Bombers	18	5	13	0	474	558	−84	10

Source: "2005 Regular Season Standings". Canadian Football League. Archived from the original on 2008-09-21.
(C) First round bye; (Q) Qualified for playoffs

=== Season schedule ===
Week	Date	Visitor	Score	Home	OT	Attendance	Record	Pts
1	June 24	Ottawa Renegades	16–41	Edmonton Eskimos		36,912	1–0–0	2
2	June 30	Edmonton Eskimos	27–8	Winnipeg Blue Bombers		22,087	2–0–0	4
3	July 8	Edmonton Eskimos	29–32	Montreal Alouettes		20,202	2–1–0	4
4	July 15	Winnipeg Blue Bombers	12–14	Edmonton Eskimos		37,455	3–1–0	6
5	July 21	Edmonton Eskimos	29–21	Ottawa Renegades		17,607	4–1–0	8
6	July 30	Hamilton Tiger-Cats	30–36	Edmonton Eskimos		38,018	5–1–0	10
7	Aug 5	Edmonton Eskimos	19–25	BC Lions		35,568	5–2–0	10
8	Bye						5–2–0	10
9	Aug 20	Toronto Argonauts	22–18	Edmonton Eskimos		38,927	5–3–0	10
10	Aug 26	Montreal Alouettes	26–36	Edmonton Eskimos		44,624	6–3–0	12
11	Sept 5	Edmonton Eskimos	25–23	Calgary Stampeders		35,652	7–3–0	14
12	Sept 9	Calgary Stampeders	16–11	Edmonton Eskimos		42,654	7–4–0	14
13	Sept 18	Edmonton Eskimos	36–37	Saskatchewan Roughriders		25,226	7–5–0	14
14	Sept 24	BC Lions	20–37	Edmonton Eskimos		48,048	8–5–0	16
15	Sept 30	Edmonton Eskimos	14–40	Hamilton Tiger-Cats		27,582	8–6–0	16
16	Oct 10	Edmonton Eskimos	17–13	Toronto Argonauts		34,116	9–6–0	18
17	Oct 15	Saskatchewan Roughriders	18–19	Edmonton Eskimos		53,216	10–6–0	20
18	Bye						10–6–0	20
19	Oct 28	BC Lions	19–22	Edmonton Eskimos		37,554	11–6–0	22
20	Nov 6	Edmonton Eskimos	23–43	Calgary Stampeders		31,017	11–7–0	22

Total attendance: 377,408
Average attendance: 41,934 (69.8%)

== Playoffs ==
Week	Date	Visitor	Score	Home	OT	Attendance
Division Semi-Final	Nov 13	Edmonton Eskimos	33–26	Calgary Stampeders		26,799
Division Final	Nov 20	Edmonton Eskimos	28–23	BC Lions		37,337
Grey Cup	Nov 27	Montreal Alouettes	35–38	Edmonton Eskimos	OT	59,157

=== West Semi-Final ===
Team	Q1	Q2	Q3	Q4	Total
Edmonton Eskimos	0	12	4	17	33
Calgary Stampeders	9	14	0	3	26

=== West Final ===
Team	Q1	Q2	Q3	Q4	Total
Edmonton Eskimos	14	7	0	7	28
BC Lions	3	7	11	2	23

=== Grey Cup ===
Team	Q1	Q2	Q3	Q4	OT	Total
Montreal Alouettes	1	0	17	10	7	35
Edmonton Eskimos	3	7	10	8	10	38

== Roster ==
2005 Edmonton Eskimos final roster
Quarterbacks: 16 Jason Johnson; 12 Jason Maas; 15 Ricky Ray; Running backs: 30 Mathieu Bertrand; 32 Troy Davis; 8 Dahrran Diedrick; 89 Deitan Dubuc; 19 Mike Maurer; Receivers: 85 Trevor Gaylor; 81 Ed Hervey; 87 Derrell Mitchell; 88 Andrew Nowacki; 14 Tony Tompkins; 83 Jason Tucker	Offensive linemen: 66 Sandy Annunziata G/C; 62 Bruce Beaton T; 67 Dan Comiskey G/T; 65 Kevin Lefsrud C; 63 Joe McGrath G; 60 Chris Morris T; Defensive linemen: 95 Charles Alston DE; 98 Steve Charbonneau DT; 34 Tim Fleiszer DE; 96 Jabari Issa DT; 53 Joe Montford DE; 76 Randy Spencer DT; Special teams: 11 Sean Fleming K/P	Linebackers: 90 Antico Dalton; 77 A. J. Gass; 43 Roger Reinson; 40 Marcus Winn; 55 Glen Young; Defensive backs: 26 Donny Brady; 28 Keyuo Craver; 10 Malcolm Frank; 23 Shannon Garrett; 18 Will Loftus; 13 Steven Marsh; 27 Singor Mobley; 31 Kelly Wiltshire	Injured list: 22 Mike Bradley RB; 61 Glenn Carson G; 82 Kwame Cavil SB; 29 Gerald Dixon DB; 52 Taylor Inglis LS; 97 Rashad Jeanty DE; 9 Mike Jenkins RB; 56 Patrick Kabongo G; -- Jason Lamar LB; 3 Robert LeBlanc SB; 24 Ron McClendon RB; 50 Rhett McLane G; 33 Davis Sanchez DB; 96 Cedric Scott DT; 45 Quincy Stewart LB; Italics indicate International player
