= 2005 Calgary Stampeders season =

Canadian football team season

- Head coach: Tom Higgins
- Home stadium: McMahon Stadium

Results
- Record: 11–7
- Division place: 2nd, West
- Playoffs: Lost West Semi-Final

Uniform

The 2005 Calgary Stampeders season was the 48th season for the team in the Canadian Football League (CFL) and their 67th overall. The Stampeders finished second place in the West division with an 11–7 record. They appeared in the West Semi-Final where they lost to the Edmonton Eskimos.

== Offseason ==
=== CFL draft ===
Round	Pick	Player	Position	School/Club team
1	1	Miguel Robede	DE	Laval
2	10	Godfrey Ellis	OL	Acadia
3	19	John Comiskey	OT	Windsor
4	27	Kyler Jukes	OL	Regina
5	36	David Hewson	DB	Manitoba
6	45	Brett Ralph	WR	Alberta

=== Preseason ===
Week	Date	Opponent	Score	Result	Attendance	Record
A	June 7	vs. Saskatchewan Roughriders	18–14	Win	24,700	1–0
B	June 16	at BC Lions	31–16	Loss	23,753	1–1

== Regular season ==
=== Season standings ===
West Division
Pos	Team	Pld	W	L	T	PF	PA	PD	Pts
1	BC Lions (C, Q)	18	12	6	0	550	444	+106	24
2	Calgary Stampeders (Q)	18	11	7	0	529	443	+86	22
3	Edmonton Eskimos (Q)	18	11	7	0	453	421	+32	22
4	Saskatchewan Roughriders (Q)	18	9	9	0	441	433	+8	18
5	Winnipeg Blue Bombers	18	5	13	0	474	558	−84	10

Source: "2005 Regular Season Standings". Canadian Football League. Archived from the original on 2008-09-21.
(C) First round bye; (Q) Qualified for playoffs

=== Season schedule ===
Week	Date	Opponent	Score	Result	Attendance	Record
1	Bye					0–0
2	July 1	vs. Toronto Argonauts	22–16	Loss	34,102	0–1
3	July 7	at Winnipeg Blue Bombers	21–15	Win	23,236	1–1
4	July 16	at Ottawa Renegades	33–18	Loss	16,303	1–2
5	July 23	vs. Saskatchewan Roughriders	44–18	Win	35,652	2–2
6	July 29	at BC Lions	40–27	Loss	28,714	2–3
7	August 6	vs. Winnipeg Blue Bombers	30–21	Win	30,128	3–3
8	August 12	vs. BC Lions	39–31	Loss	31,847	3–4
9	August 18	at Montreal Alouettes	40–37	Win	20,202	4–4
10	August 24	at Toronto Argonauts	25–16	Loss	24,637	4–5
11	September 5	vs. Edmonton Eskimos	25–23	Loss	35,652	4–6
12	September 9	at Edmonton Eskimos	16–11	Win	42,654	5–6
13	September 17	at Hamilton Tiger-Cats	39–17	Win	27,821	6–6
14	September 22	vs. Ottawa Renegades	45–23	Win	25,234	7–6
15	October 1	vs. Montreal Alouettes	32–11	Loss	28,304	7–7
16	Bye					7–7
17	October 14	vs. Hamilton Tiger-Cats	34–17	Win	29,490	8–7
18	October 23	at Saskatchewan Roughriders	29–21	Win	28,800	9–7
19	October 30	at Winnipeg Blue Bombers	46–24	Win	23,455	10–7
20	November 6	vs. Edmonton Eskimos	43–23	Win	31,017	11–7

== Playoffs ==
=== Schedule ===
Game	Date	Time	Opponent	Score	Result	Attendance
West Semi-Final	November 13	4:00 PM MST	vs. Edmonton Eskimos	33–26	Loss	26,799

=== West Semi-Final ===
Team	Q1	Q2	Q3	Q4	Total
Edmonton Eskimos	0	12	4	17	33
Calgary Stampeders	9	14	0	3	26

== Roster ==
2005 Calgary Stampeders final roster
Quarterbacks: 1 Henry Burris; 17 Jason Gesser; 15 Danny Wimprine; Running backs: 4 Scott Deibert; 32 Joffrey Reynolds; 34 Tony Stallings; Receivers: 80 Jeremaine Copeland; 84 MarTay Jenkins; 19 Mike Juhasz; 82 Nik Lewis; 11 Brett Ralph; 85 Ken-Yon Rambo; 81 Terrence Wilkins	Offensive linemen: 62 John Comiskey G/C; 57 David De La Perralle T; 61 Godfrey Ellis G/C; 66 Alexandre Gauthier T; 50 Jay McNeil G; 64 Jeff Pilon T; 65 Taylor Robertson G; Defensive linemen: 53 Rahim Abdullah DE; 76 Randy Chevrier DT; 91 Demetrious Maxie DE; 92 Sheldon Napastuk DT; 93 Terrence Patrick DE	Linebackers: 37 Marc Calixte; 48 Brian Clark; 56 Scott Coe; 7 John Grace; 39 Marc Mitchell; 38 George White; Defensive backs: 23 Joey Boese; 41 Jermaine Chatman; 31 Ben Kelly; 3 Wes Lysack; 9 Pascal Masson; 24 Don McGee; 28 Coby Rhinehart; 42 Shane Walton; 33 Trey Young	Special teams: 14 Burke Dales P; 12 Sandro DeAngelis K; Injured list: 8 Cornelius Anthony LB; 30 Craig Carr RB; 67 Jamie Crysdale C; 25 Lawrence Deck DB; 16 Josh Harris QB; 58 Tyler Lynem T; Italics indicate International player

== Awards and records ==
=== 2005 CFL All-Stars ===
- RB – Joffrey Reynolds
- LB – John Grace
- K – Sandro DeAngelis
