= 2005 Montreal Alouettes season =

Canadian football team season

- Head coach: Don Matthews
- Home stadium: Molson Stadium

Results
- Record: 10–8
- Division place: 2nd, East
- Playoffs: Lost Grey Cup

Uniform

The 2005 Montreal Alouettes finished second place in the East Division with a 10–8 record. This was a disappointing season, by Alouettes standards, but they made it to the Grey Cup the hard way. They hosted the East Semi-Final and defeated the Saskatchewan Roughriders at Olympic Stadium, 30–14. They then traveled to Toronto to face the Argonauts at the Skydome, and they won 33–17, to advance to the Grey Cup. After a hard fought game they lost to the Edmonton Eskimos, 38–35 in what was only the second ever Grey Cup to be won in overtime.

== Offseason ==
=== CFL draft ===
Round	Pick	Player	Position	School/Club team
1	5	Matthieu Proulx	DB	Laval
2	12	Jeff Piercy	RB	Saskatchewan
2	13	Thomas Whitfield	DB	Syracuse
2	19	Philip Gauthier	DB	Laval
3	24	Victor Cabral	LB	Georgia Southern
4	33	Mike Ray	K/P	McMaster
5	42	Curt Hundeby	OL	Saskatchewan
6	49	Adam Eckert	WR	Dickinson State
6	51	Oliver Manigat	OL	Columbia

== Preseason ==
Week	Date	Opponent	Venue	Score	Result	Attendance	Record
A	June 9	Ottawa Renegades	Molson Stadium	27–16	Loss	20,202	0–1
B	June 16	at Ottawa Renegades	Frank Clair Stadium	30–10	Win	12,660	1–1

== Regular season ==
=== Season standings ===
East Division
Team	GP	W	L	T	PF	PA	Pts	
Toronto Argonauts	18	11	7	0	486	387	22	Details
Montreal Alouettes	18	10	8	0	592	519	20	Details
Ottawa Renegades	18	7	11	0	458	578	14	Details
Hamilton Tiger-Cats	18	5	13	0	383	583	10	Details

=== Season schedule ===
Week	Date	Opponent	Venue	Score	Result	Attendance	Record
1	June 22	Hamilton Tiger-Cats	Molson Stadium	31–21	Win	20,202	1–0
2	July 1	at Ottawa Renegades	Frank Clair Stadium	39–36	Loss	18,899	1–1
3	July 8	Edmonton Eskimos	Molson Stadium	32–29	Win	20,202	2–1
4	Bye						
5	July 22	at Winnipeg Blue Bombers	Canad Inns Stadium	51–46	Loss	24,550	2–2
6	July 28	Toronto Argonauts	Molson Stadium	36–24	Loss	20,202	2–3
7	Aug 4	Saskatchewan Roughriders	Molson Stadium	42–13	Win	20,202	3–3
8	Aug 12	at Toronto Argonauts	Rogers Centre	18–10	Win	31,621	4–3
9	Aug 18	Calgary Stampeders	Molson Stadium	40–37	Loss	20,202	4–4
10	Aug 26	at Edmonton Eskimos	Commonwealth Stadium	36–26	Loss	44,624	4–5
11	Sept 2	Ottawa Renegades	Molson Stadium	41–18	Win	20,202	5–5
12	Bye						
13	Sept 17	at BC Lions	BC Place Stadium	27–26	Loss	36,066	5–6
14	Sept 25	Winnipeg Blue Bombers	Molson Stadium	42–23	Win	20,202	6–6
15	Oct 1	at Calgary Stampeders	McMahon Stadium	32–11	Win	28,304	7–6
16	Oct 8	at Saskatchewan Roughriders	Taylor Field	38–34	Win	26,900	8–6
17	Oct 16	BC Lions	Molson Stadium	46–44	Win	20,202	9–6
18	Oct 22	Toronto Argonauts	Olympic Stadium	49–23	Loss	51,269	9–7
19	Oct 29	at Ottawa Renegades	Frank Clair Stadium	43–23	Win	20,833	10–7
20	Nov 4	at Hamilton Tiger-Cats	Ivor Wynne Stadium	15–9	Loss	27,114	10–8

== Playoffs ==
=== Scotiabank East Semi-Final ===
Team	Q1	Q2	Q3	Q4	Total
Saskatchewan Roughriders	0	0	7	7	14
Montreal Alouettes	7	17	3	3	30

=== Scotiabank East Final ===
Team	Q1	Q2	Q3	Q4	Total
Montreal Alouettes	0	6	14	13	33
Toronto Argonauts	14	0	3	0	17

=== Grey Cup ===
Team	Q1	Q2	Q3	Q4	OT	Total
Montreal Alouettes	1	0	17	10	7	35
Edmonton Eskimos	3	7	10	8	10	38

== Roster ==
2005 Montreal Alouettes final roster
Quarterbacks: 13 Anthony Calvillo; 11 Ell Roberson; 7 Ted White; Running backs: 5 Éric Lapointe; 32 Jonas Lewis; 34 Jeff Piercy; 35 Mike Vilimek; Receivers: 87 Thyron Anderson; 86 Ben Cahoon; 89 Shaun Diner; 87 Tim Gilligan; 3 Sylvain Girard; 16 Ezra Landry; 88 Dave Stala; 2 Terry Vaughn; 81 Kerry Watkins	Offensive linemen: 68 Bryan Chiu C; 51 Aaron Fiacconi G; 57 Scott Flory G; 61 Luke Fritz T/G; 65 Paul Lambert G/C; 67 Dave Mudge T; 53 Uzooma Okeke T; Defensive linemen: 94 Robert Brown DT; 54 Marc Megna DE; 66 John Nix DT; 75 Ed Philion DT; 9 Anwar Stewart DE; 90 Mawuko Tugbenyoh DE	Linebackers: 30 Michael Botterill; 25 Duane Butler; 4 Patrick Dorvélus; 33 Jeremiah Garrison; 44 Kevin Johnson; Defensive backs: 37 Ricky Bell; 26 Darrel Crutchfield; 8 Reggie Durden; 24 Phillip Gauthier; 1 Richard Karikari; 27 Kelly Malveaux; 20 Matthieu Proulx; 38 Tim Strickland	Special teams: 15 Damon Duval K/P; 52 Chris Vrantsis LS; Injured list: 69 Paul Archer C; 22 Almondo Curry DB; 47 Robert Edwards RB; 99 Clinton Wayne DT; 10 O'Neil Wilson SB; Italics indicate International player

== Awards ==
=== 2005 CFL All-Star Selections ===
- Kerry Watkins – Wide Receiver
- Uzooma Okeke – Offensive Tackle
- Scott Flory – Offensive Guard
- Bryan Chiu – Centre
- Richard Karikari – Safety

=== 2005 CFL Eastern All-Star Selections ===
- Ben Cahoon – Slotback
- Kerry Watkins – Wide Receiver
- Robert Edwards – Running Back
- Uzooma Okeke – Offensive Tackle
- Scott Flory – Offensive Guard
- Bryan Chiu – Centre
- Ed Philion – Defensive Tackle
- Duane Butler – Linebacker
- Richard Karikari – Safety
