= Karikari (surname) =

Karikari is a surname. Notable people with the surname include:

- Godfred Karikari (born 1985), Ghanaian-born Hong Kong footballer
- Kwame Karikari (born 1992), Ghanaian footballer
- Kwaku Karikari (born 2002), Ghanaian footballer
- Ohene Karikari (born 1954), Ghanaian sprinter
- Richard Karikari (born 1979), Canadian football player
