= 2005 Ottawa Renegades season =

Canadian football team season

- Head coach: Joe Paopao
- Home stadium: Frank Clair Stadium

Results
- Record: 7–11
- Division place: 3rd, East
- Playoffs: did not qualify

Uniform

The 2005 Ottawa Renegades season was the fourth and final season for the team in the Canadian Football League (CFL). The Renegades finished the season with a 7–11 record and failed to make the playoffs.

== Offseason ==
=== CFL draft ===
Round	Pick	Player	Position	School
1	2	Cam Yeow	LB	Akron
3	20	Les Mullings	RB	St. Mary's
4	28	Cory Hathaway	TE/FB	Tulsa
5	37	Adrian Baird	DE	Ottawa
6	46	Lenard Semajuste	FB	Adams State

== Preseason ==
Game	Date	Opponent	Results		Venue	Attendance
Game	Date	Opponent	Score	Record	Venue	Attendance
A	Thu, June 9	at Montreal Alouettes	W 27–16	1–0	Molson Stadium	20,202
B	Thu, June 16	vs. Montreal Alouettes	L 10–30	1–1	Frank Clair Stadium	12,660

== Regular season ==
=== Season standings ===
East Division
Team	GP	W	L	T	PF	PA	Pts	
Toronto Argonauts	18	11	7	0	486	387	22	Details
Montreal Alouettes	18	10	8	0	592	519	20	Details
Ottawa Renegades	18	7	11	0	458	578	14	Details
Hamilton Tiger-Cats	18	5	13	0	383	583	10	Details

=== Season schedule ===
Week	Game	Date	Opponent	Results		Venue	Attendance
Week	Game	Date	Opponent	Score	Record	Venue	Attendance
1	1	Fri, June 24	at Edmonton Eskimos	L 16–41	0–1	Commonwealth Stadium	36,912
2	2	Fri, July 1	vs. Montreal Alouettes	W 39–36 (OT)	1–1	Frank Clair Stadium	18,889
3	3	Fri, July 8	at BC Lions	L 29–37	1–2	BC Place	27,506
4	4	Sat, July 16	vs. Calgary Stampeders	W 33–18	2–2	Frank Clair Stadium	16,303
5	5	Thu, July 21	vs. Edmonton Eskimos	L 21–29	2–3	Frank Clair Stadium	17,607
6	6	Fri, July 29	at Saskatchewan Roughriders	W 21–16	3–3	Taylor Field	25,198
7	7	Sat, Aug 6	at Hamilton Tiger-Cats	W 28–12	4–3	Ivor Wynne Stadium	28,822
8	8	Thu, Aug 11	vs. Saskatchewan Roughriders	W 22–17	5–3	Frank Clair Stadium	20,607
9	9	Fri, Aug 19	at Winnipeg Blue Bombers	L 17–38	5–4	Canad Inns Stadium	26,595
10	Bye						
11	10	Fri, Sept, 2	at Montreal Alouettes	L 18–41	5–5	Molson Stadium	20,202
12	11	Thu, Sept 8	vs. BC Lions	L 27–61	5–6	Frank Clair Stadium	19,013
13	12	Fri, Sept 16	vs. Winnipeg Blue Bombers	L 21–37	5–7	Frank Clair Stadium	17,567
14	13	Thu, Sept 22	at Calgary Stampeders	L 23–45	5–8	McMahon Stadium	25,234
15	14	Wed, Sept 28	at Toronto Argonauts	L 18–29	5–9	Rogers Centre	24,866
16	15	Fri, Oct 7	vs. Hamilton Tiger-Cats	W 43–21	6–9	Frank Clair Stadium	19,069
17	Bye						
18	17	Fri, Oct 21	at Hamilton Tiger-Cats	L 32–40	6–10	Ivor Wynne Stadium	26,912
19	17	Sat, Oct 29	vs. Montreal Alouettes	L 23–43	6–11	Frank Clair Stadium	20,833
20	18	Sat, Nov 5	vs. Toronto Argonauts	W 27–17	7–11	Frank Clair Stadium	16,504

== Playoffs ==
The Saskatchewan Roughriders (the 4th place team in the West division) had more points than The Ottawa Renegades (who finished 3rd in the East division), and under the CFL's "crossover" rule, The Ottawa Renegades would not qualify for the 2005 CFL playoffs.

== Roster ==
2005 Ottawa Renegades final roster
Quarterbacks: 17 Brad Banks; 4 Kerry Joseph; 7 Darnell Kennedy; Running backs: 34 KaRon Coleman; 33 Cory Hathaway; 20 Gilles Lezi; 30 Josh Ranek; Receivers: 88 Jason Armstead; 87 Frank Cutolo; 81 Gerald Harris; 82 Markus Howell; 80 Yo Murphy; 16 Pat Woodcock	Offensive linemen: 58 Pascal Cheron T; 52 George Hudson C/T; 65 Obby Khan G; 67 Jean-Francois Roy C; 57 Val St. Germain G/T; 63 Mike Sutherland C; Defensive linemen: 97 Anthony Collier DE; 93 Kai Ellis DE; 90 Matt Kirk DE; 99 Jerome Haywood DT; 95 Cameron Legault DT; 75 Marc Pilon DT	Linebackers: 19 Donnavan Carter; 23 Kyries Hebert; 6 Jason Kralt; 48 D'Wayne Taylor; 46 Cam Yeow; Defensive backs: 24 Korey Banks; 9 Greg Bearman; 32 Crance Clemons; 29 Greg Moss; 2 Ron Rogers; 3 Donnie Ruiz; 39 Gerald Vaughn; 35 Sean Weston	Special teams: 8 Pat Fleming P/K; 15 Matt Kellett K/P; Injured list: 22 Da'Shann Austin DB; 86 David Azzi WR; 21 Quincy Coleman DB; 56 Keaton Cromartie DE; 37 Dave Donaldson DB; 42 Robert Grant LB; 55 Freddie Moore T; 74 Johnny Scott DT; 54 Morris Unutoa G; Italics indicate American player
