= Fabio Filice =

Canadian football player (born 1981)

No. 69
- Position: Guard

Personal information
- Born: July 16, 1981 (age 45); Hamilton, Ontario, Canada
- Listed height: 6 ft 2 in (1.88 m)
- Listed weight: 297 lb (135 kg)

Career information
- College: McMaster
- CFL draft: 2005: 2nd round, 15th overall pick

Career history
- 2005–2006: Hamilton Tiger-Cats
- 2007: Toronto Argonauts
- 2008: Edmonton Eskimos*
- 2008: Calgary Stampeders
- * Offseason or practice squad member only

Awards and highlights
- Grey Cup champion (2008); First-team All-Canadian; Second-team All-Canadian; First-team OUA All-Star; Second-team OUA All-Star
- Stats at CFL.ca

Fabio Filice (born July 16, 1981) is a Canadian former professional football guard who played in the Canadian Football League (CFL). Filice played most of his career as an offensive lineman with his crowning achievement coming in 2008 when he won the Grey Cup with the Calgary Stampeders. He retired after the 2008 CFL season.
