= Jason Armstead =

American gridiron football player (born 1979)

Profile
- Positions: Wide receiver, Kick returner

Personal information
- Born: September 18, 1979 (age 47); Moss Point, Mississippi, U.S.
- Listed height: 5 ft 10 in (1.78 m)
- Listed weight: 165 lb (75 kg)

Career information
- College: Mississippi

Career history
- 2003: Pittsburgh Steelers*
- 2004–2005: Ottawa Renegades
- 2006–2007: Saskatchewan Roughriders
- 2007: Hamilton Tiger-Cats
- 2008: Montreal Alouettes
- 2008: Winnipeg Blue Bombers
- 2009: Saskatchewan Roughriders
- 2010: Las Vegas Locomotives
- 2010–2011: Edmonton Eskimos
- 2012: Calgary Stampeders
- * Offseason or practice squad member only

Awards and highlights
- CFL All-Star (2005); CFL East All-Star (2005); John Agro Special Teams Award runner up (2004)
- Stats at CFL.ca (archive)

Jason Armstead (born September 18, 1979) is a former professional Canadian football and American football kick returner and wide receiver. Armstead is currently a free-agent. He was most recently a member of the Calgary Stampeders in the Canadian Football League. He was signed by the Pittsburgh Steelers as an undrafted free agent in 2003. He played college football for Mississippi. He dated Flight Attendant Juline Haughton from 2009 - 2010.

He has also been a member of the Ottawa Renegades, Saskatchewan Roughriders, Hamilton Tiger-Cats, Montreal Alouettes, Winnipeg Blue Bombers, Las Vegas Locomotives, and the Edmonton Eskimos.

== Professional career ==
In 2003, Armstead played three pre-season games as a kick returner for the Pittsburgh Steelers of the National Football League. Armstead was signed by the Ottawa Renegades of the CFL in 2004 and he was named to the CFL All-Star team for the 2005 CFL season. Armstead was selected third overall by Saskatchewan in the Renegades dispersal draft in 2006. On August 19, 2007, he was traded to the Hamilton Tiger-Cats for running back/returner Corey Holmes and receiver Chris Getzlaf. On July 21, 2008, Armstead was released from the Montreal Alouettes.

On August 31, 2009, he was again signed by the Saskatchewan Roughriders. On February 13, 2010, Armstead was charged with several criminal offenses stemming from an incident in Pascagoula, Mississippi involving his former girlfriend's purse. On April 15, 2010, it was announced that the Roughriders had released Armstead.

On October 21, 2010, Armstead was signed by the Edmonton Eskimos. After being released in the following off-season, Armstead was re-signed on August 8, 2011, following injuries to Fred Stamps and Adarius Bowman. He was again released on January 19, 2012.

On September 12, 2012, the Calgary Stampeders signed Armstead as a receiver/kick returner. Armstead is entering his ninth CFL season and has recorded 13,812 combined yards and 24 touchdowns in 106 games played with Ottawa, Saskatchewan, Hamilton, Montreal, Winnipeg and Edmonton. On February 25, 2013, Armstead was released by the Calgary Stampeders.

== Career statistics ==
Receiving		Regular season						Playoffs
Year	Team	Games	No.	Yards	Avg	Long	TD	Games	No.	Yards	Avg	Long	TD
2004	OTT	16	41	608	14.8	83	4	Team did not qualify
2005	OTT	18	89	1307	14.7	75	5	Team did not qualify
2006	SSK	16	47	651	13.9	56	6	2	3	51	17.0	34	0
2007	SSK	8	15	226	15.1	35	1
2007	HAM	10	31	392	12.6	48	0	Team did not qualify
2008	MTL	4	3	38	12.7	22	0
2008	WPG	10	0	0	0.0	0	0	1	0	0	0.0	0	0
2009	SSK	10	3	28	9.3	14	0	2	0	0	0.0	0	0
2010	EDM	3	1	6	6.0	6	0	Team did not qualify
2011	EDM	12	11	104	9.5	35	0	2	4	55	13.8	37	0
2012	CGY	5	3	18	6.0	11	0	0	0	0	0.0	0	0
CFL totals		112	244	3,378	13.8	83	16	7	7	106	15.1	37	0

Rushing		Regular season						Playoffs
Year	Team	Games	No.	Yards	Avg	Long	TD	Games	No.	Yards	Avg	Long	TD
2004	OTT	16	3	17	5.7	14	0	Team did not qualify
2005	OTT	18	6	44	7.3	16	0	Team did not qualify
2006	SSK	16	19	80	4.2	11	1	2	3	24	8.0	11	0
2007	SSK	8	0	0	0.0	0	0
2007	HAM	10	0	0	0.0	0	0	Team did not qualify
2008	MTL	4	2	13	6.5	11	0
2008	WPG	10	0	0	0.0	0	0	1	0	0	0.0	0	0
2009	SSK	10	1	2	2.0	2	0	2	1	6	6.0	6	0
2010	EDM	3	0	0	0.0	0	0	Team did not qualify
2011	EDM	12	6	17	2.8	10	0	2	1	5	5.0	5	0
2012	CGY	5	0	0	0.0	0	0	0	0	0	0.0	0	0
CFL totals		112	37	173	4.7	16	1	7	5	35	7.0	11	0

Punt Returns		Regular season						Playoffs
Year	Team	Games	No.	Yards	Avg	Long	TD	Games	No.	Yards	Avg	Long	TD
2004	OTT	16	64	821	12.8	91	1	Team did not qualify
2005	OTT	18	70	699	10.0	87	1	Team did not qualify
2006	SSK	16	42	412	9.8	40	0	2	0	0	0.0	0	0
2007	SSK	8	43	371	8.6	90	1
2007	HAM	10	36	181	5.0	21	0	Team did not qualify
2008	MTL	4	16	104	6.5	20	0
2008	WPG	10	60	624	10.4	84	1	1	9	122	13.6	93	1
2009	SSK	10	42	387	9.2		0	2	8	75	9.4		0
2010	EDM	3	13	149	11.5	58	1	Team did not qualify
2011	EDM	12	62	486	7.8	0	1	2	5	42	8.4	10	0
2012	CGY	5	21	199	9.5	0	0	0	0	0	0.0	0	0
CFL totals		112	469	4433	9.5	91	6	7	22	239	10.9	93	1

Kickoff Returns		Regular season						Playoffs
Year	Team	Games	No.	Yards	Avg	Long	TD	Games	No.	Yards	Avg	Long	TD
2004	OTT	16	37	700	18.9	38	0	Team did not qualify
2005	OTT	18	51	1082	21.2	46	0	Team did not qualify
2006	SSK	16	20	267	13.4	29	0	2	0	0	0.0	0	0
2007	SSK	8	12	211	17.6	31	0
2007	HAM	10	35	645	18.4	38	0	Team did not qualify
2008	MTL	4	10	165	16.5	26	0
2008	WPG	10	0	0	0.0	0	0	1	0	0	0.0	0	0
2009	SSK	10	33	806	24.4	54	0	2	8	188	23.5	75	0
2010	EDM	3	8	139	17.4	34	0	Team did not qualify
2011	EDM	12	35	684	19.5	49	0	2	6	130	21.7	27	0
2012	CGY	5	17	482	28.4	84	0	0	0	0	0.0	0	0
CFL totals		112	292	5976	20.5	84	0	7	14	318	22.7	75	0

Missed FG Returns		Regular season						Playoffs
Year	Team	Games	No.	Yards	Avg	Long	TD	Games	No.	Yards	Avg	Long	TD
2004	OTT	16	4	160	40.0	115	0	Team did not qualify
2005	OTT	18	6	221	36.8	63	0	Team did not qualify
2006	SSK	16	0	0	0.0	0	0	2	0	0	0.0	0	0
2007	SSK	8	0	0	0.0	0	0
2007	HAM	10	2	47	23.5	26	0	Team did not qualify
2008	MTL	4	1	22	22.0	22	0
2008	WPG	10	2	57	28.5	40	0	1	0	0	0.0	0	0
2009	SSK	10	1	19	19.0	19	0	2	0	0	0.0	0	0
2010	EDM	3	1	-1	-1.0	-1	0	Team did not qualify
2011	EDM	12	2	26	13.0	16	0	2	0	0	0.0	0	0
2012	CGY	5	1	20	20.0	20	0	0	0	0	0.0	0	0
CFL totals		112	20	571	28.6	115	0	7	0	0	0.0	0	0
