= Michael Fletcher (linebacker) =

American gridiron football player and coach (born 1977)

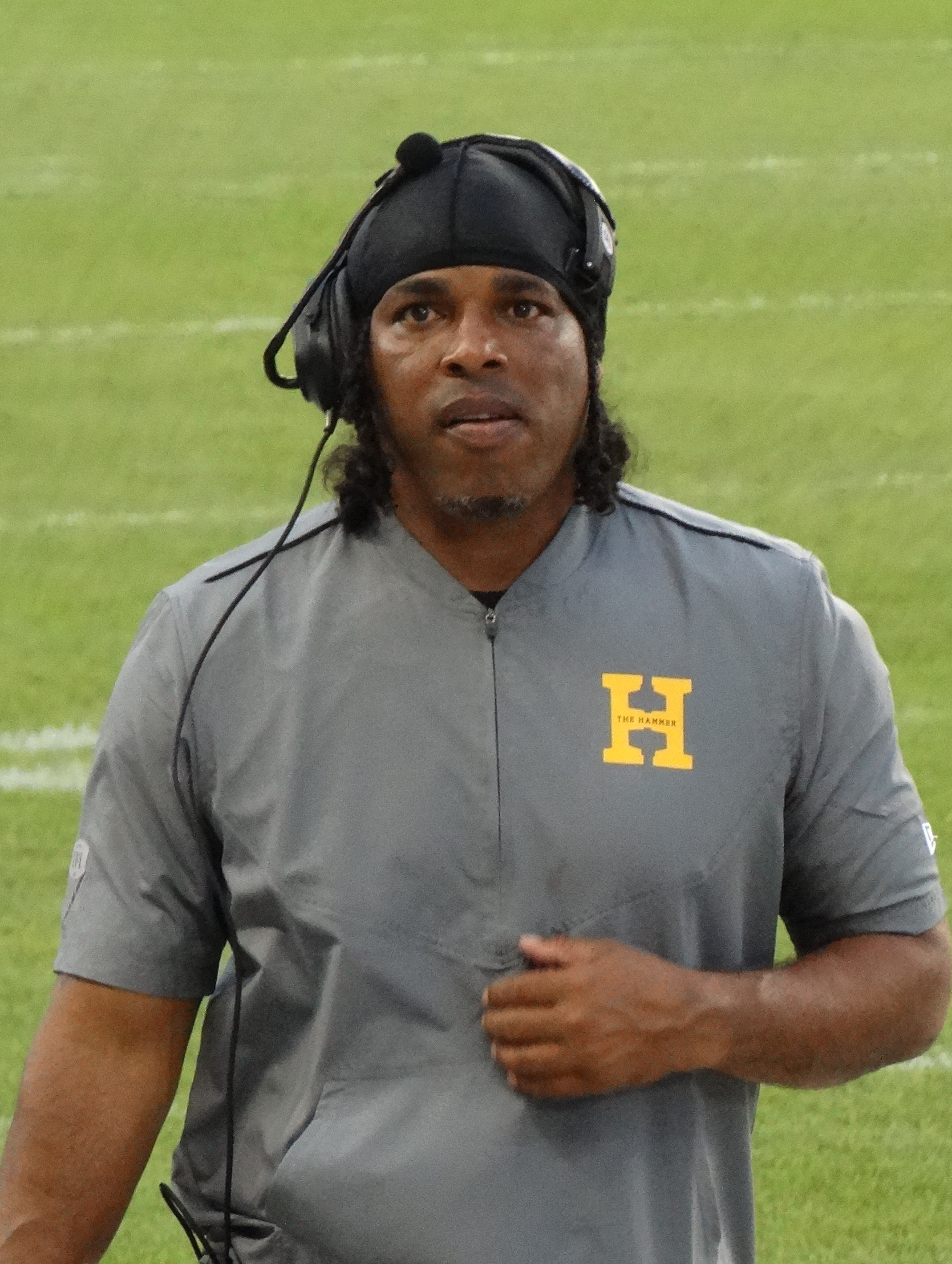
- Fletcher with the Hamilton Tiger-Cats in 2024

No. 6, 2
- Position: Linebacker

Personal information
- Born: February 17, 1977 (age 49); Compton, California, U.S.
- Listed height: 5 ft 10 in (1.78 m)
- Listed weight: 209 lb (95 kg)

Career information
- College: Oregon

Career history
- 2000–2001: BC Lions
- 2002–2008: Toronto Argonauts
- 2020–2022: Arizona State Sun Devils (Defensive analyst)
- 2024: Hamilton Tiger-Cats (Linebackers coach)

Awards and highlights
- 3× Grey Cup champion (2000, 2004); James P. McCaffrey Trophy (2005); First-team All-Pac-10 (1999); CFL All-Star (2005); CFL East All-Star (2005)
- Stats at CFL.ca (archive)

Michael Edward Fletcher (born February 17, 1977) is an American former professional football linebacker who played for nine seasons in the Canadian Football League (CFL) with the BC Lions and Toronto Argonauts. He is a CFL All-Star and a two-time Grey Cup champion, having won with the Lions in 2000 and with the Argonauts in 2004. He has also served as the linebackers coach for the Hamilton Tiger-Cats.

== College career ==
Fletcher attended the University of Oregon and was a four-year starter at cornerback and strong safety for the Ducks. He finished his college football career with six interceptions and 225 tackles.

== Professional career ==
=== BC Lions ===
Fletcher spent the first two years of his CFL career with the BC Lions where he won a Grey Cup championship in his rookie year in 2000.

=== Toronto Argonauts ===
Fletcher joined the Toronto Argonauts in 2002. He won his second Grey Cup in 2004. In 2007, Fletcher was named to the All-time Argonauts team as an OLB. The same year, a set of Michael Fletcher ball caps was released by New Era. On February 16, 2009, he became a free agent.

== Coaching career ==
=== Paramount High ===
Fletcher served as the defensive coordinator for Paramount High School's football team.

=== Arizona State Sun Devils ===
Fletcher was a defensive analyst for the Arizona State Sun Devils from 2020 to 2022.

=== Hamilton Tiger-Cats ===
On February 2, 2024, it was announced that Fletcher had joined the Hamilton Tiger-Cats to serve as the team's linebackers coach. He served in that capacity for one season.
