= Adriano Belli =

Canadian gridiron football player (born 1977)

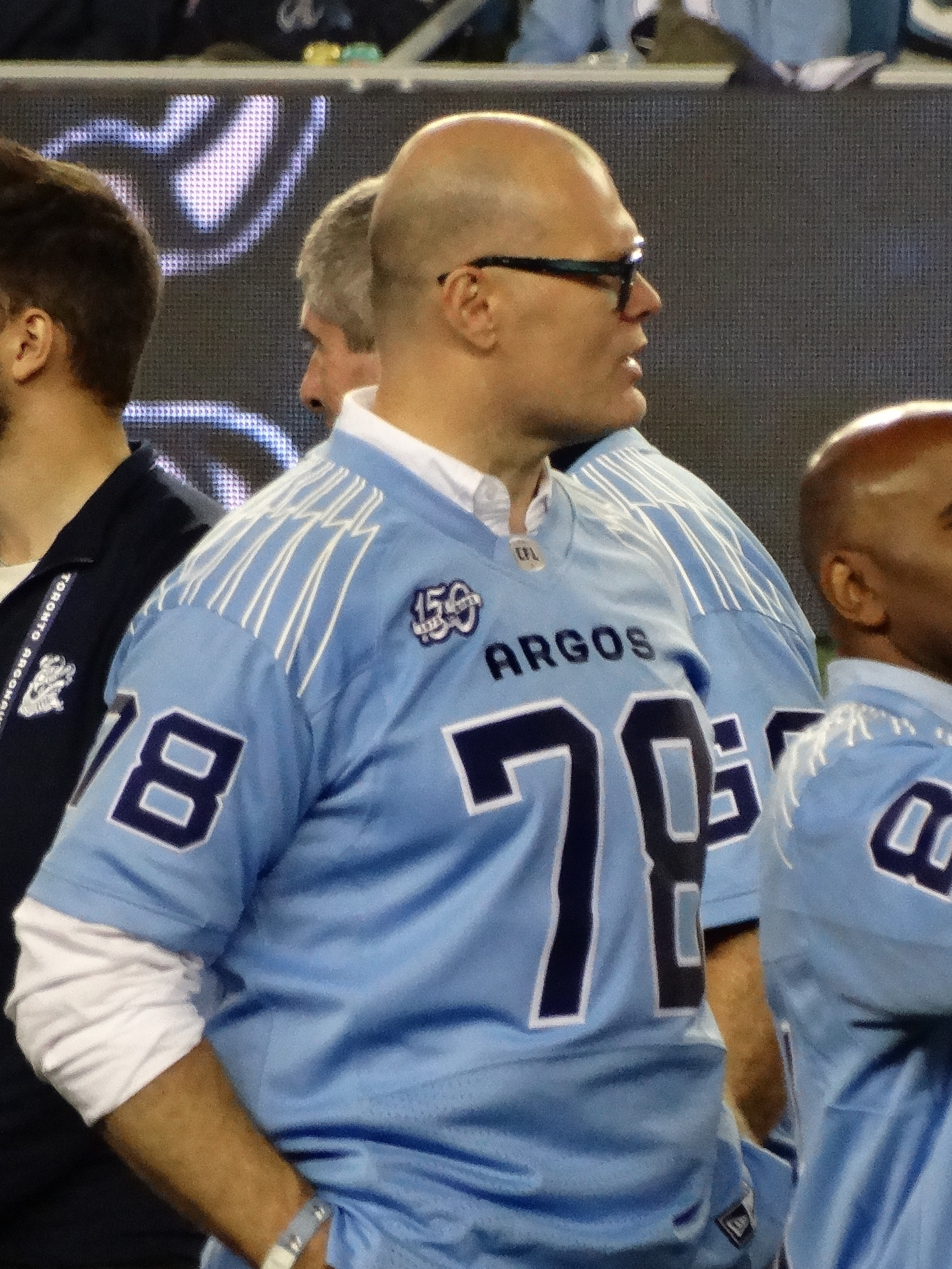
- Belli in 2023

No. 78
- Position: Defensive tackle

Personal information
- Born: August 25, 1977 (age 49); Toronto, Ontario, Canada
- Listed height: 6 ft 5 in (1.96 m)
- Listed weight: 289 lb (131 kg)

Career information
- High school: Central Tech (Toronto)
- College: Houston
- CFL draft: 2000: 1st round, 6th overall pick

Career history
- 2000: Atlanta Falcons*
- 2001: Las Vegas Outlaws
- 2001: New York Giants*
- 2001: BC Lions
- 2001–2002: Montreal Alouettes
- 2003: Cleveland Browns*
- 2003: Montreal Alouettes
- 2004–2006: Hamilton Tiger-Cats
- 2006: Montreal Alouettes
- 2007–2010: Toronto Argonauts
- 2012: Toronto Argonauts
- * Offseason or practice squad member only

Awards and highlights
- 2× Grey Cup champion (2002, 2012); CFL All-Star (2005); 2× CFL East All-Star (2005, 2007)
- Stats at CFL.ca (archive)

Adriano Belli
Medal record

Men's American football

Representing Canada

World Championship
Silver medal – second place	2011 Austria	Team competition

Adriano Belli (born August 25, 1977) is a Canadian former professional football player who played in the Canadian Football League (CFL). Belli is nicknamed "The Kissing Bandit" for his penchant for kissing people on their cheeks. He has gained a reputation for being a kind and funny man off the field and a nasty and annoying player to his opponents on the field.

== Early life ==
Belli grew up in the High Park region of Toronto and attended Humberside Collegiate Institute for the first three years of high school. He then elected to transfer to Central Technical School in the Harbord Village area of Toronto and commuted by subway to take advantage of Central Tech's football program.

== College career ==
Belli played college football for the Houston Cougars. He credits his high school coach, Chuck Wakefield, for helping him get a scholarship to the University of Houston.

== Professional career ==
Belli was drafted in the first round, sixth overall, by the BC Lions in the 2000 CFL draft. However, he spent two years in the NFL, prior to joining the Lions in 2001.

On February 19, 2007, the Toronto Argonauts signed Belli.

After the last game of the 2009 season, Belli charged into the Montreal Alouettes locker room and challenged the entire team to a fight.

Belli retired on May 11, 2011, on a Tall ship in Toronto and became a colour commentator/sportscaster on Rogers Sportsnet as their CFL Analyst.

During his retirement, Belli competed for Team Canada when they participated in the 2011 IFAF World Championship in Austria. The team went on to win the Silver medal.

On October 17, 2012, Belli came out of retirement and was signed by the Toronto Argonauts. He went on to win the 100th Grey Cup with the Argos, a game in which he was ejected. Belli officially retired from the CFL for the second time on May 29, 2013.

== Personal life ==
Belli also runs a meat distribution and packing company with his family in Georgtetown, Ontario.
