= T. J. Stancil =

American football player (born 1982)

T.J. Stancil
Profile
- Position: LB

Personal information
- Born: July 11, 1982 (age 44); Bensalem, Pennsylvania

Career information
- College: Boston College

Career history
- 2005–2008: Saskatchewan Roughriders

Thomas J. Stancil (born June 11, 1982) is a strong-side linebacker who played for the Saskatchewan Roughriders of the Canadian Football League.

Stancil was signed as a free agent by Saskatchewan in 2005 as a backup to Jackie Mitchell, the incumbent starter at the time. However, injuries to Mitchell allowed Stancil to showcase his skills as the starter midway through 2005, and the Roughriders awarded him the starting position in 2006 while moving Mitchell to the free safety position. He however injured his knee early in the 2006 season, missing the remainder of the season. He played for Boston College during his collegiate years.

He was released by the Riders on May 31, 2008, but was picked up by the BC Lions in July. In his time with the Saskatchewan Riders, during his rookie season he was runner-up for Defensive Rookie of the Year(2005).
