= Scott Schultz =

Canadian gridiron football player (born 1978)

Profile
- Position: Defensive tackle

Personal information
- Born: April 19, 1978 (age 48); Moose Jaw, Saskatchewan, Canada
- Listed height: 6 ft 2 in (1.88 m)
- Listed weight: 286 lb (130 kg)

Career information
- College: North Dakota
- CFL draft: 2001: 1st round, 1st overall pick

Career history
- 2001: San Diego Chargers*
- 2002: Pittsburgh Steelers*
- 2002–2009: Saskatchewan Roughriders
- * Offseason or practice squad member only

Awards and highlights
- Grey Cup champion (2007); CFL All-Star (2005); CFL West All-Star (2005)
- Stats at CFL.ca

Scott Schultz (born April 19, 1978) is a Canadian former professional football defensive tackle for the Saskatchewan Roughriders of the Canadian Football League. He played college football at North Dakota.

Schultz was also a member of the San Diego Chargers and Pittsburgh Steelers.

He retired on August 4, 2009, to become the president of an insurance brokerage.
