= Elijah Thurmon =

German-born American football player (born 1978)

No. 2, 84
- Position: Wide receiver

Personal information
- Born: August 2, 1978 (age 48); Heidelberg, Germany
- Listed height: 6 ft 4 in (1.93 m)
- Listed weight: 212 lb (96 kg)

Career information
- High school: Meade (Fort Meade, Maryland)
- College: Howard University

Career history
- 2000–2001: Philadelphia Eagles*
- 2001–2002: Oakland Raiders*
- 2003: Chicago Bears*
- 2003: Berlin Thunder
- 2004–2005: Saskatchewan Roughriders
- 2006: Calgary Stampeders
- 2007–2008: Montreal Alouettes
- * Offseason or practice squad member only

Elijah Thurmon (born August 2, 1978) is an American former professional football wide receiver who played in the Canadian Football League (CFL). He entered the NFL as a free agent with the Philadelphia Eagles. Thurmon played college football for Howard University, and was inducted into their hall of fame in 2016.

== Early life ==
Thurmon attended Meade High School where he played football, basketball and track.

At Howard University Thurmon earned NCAA Academic All American, the Howard University Excellence Award, and MEAC Academic Honors. He was also a recognized as a Unanimous All American as he broke Howard and MEAC total pass receiving yards and pass receptions records.

== Professional career ==
=== National Football League ===
Considered one of the best wide receivers in the MEAC while at Howard University, Thurmon was acquired as a free agent by the NFL's Philadelphia Eagles. The following season, he signed with the Oakland Raiders and in the 2003 season, the Chicago Bears signed him and allocated him to NFL Europe's Berlin Thunder where he started ten games as wide receiver, leading the team with 37 receptions for 412 yards and five touchdowns.

=== Canadian Football League ===
After his years in the NFL, Thurmon joined the CFL Saskatchewan Roughriders in 2004 as a free agent He had 88 receptions as slotback in 2005 for 1,048 yards and seven touchdowns, and was chosen as a West Division All-Star.

Thurmon became a free agent and signed with the Calgary Stampeders in 2006.

The Montreal Alouettes signed Thurmon in 2007 and he was named their offence MVP for four of the season's 18 games.

== After professional football ==
Thurmon was inducted into the Howard University Hall of Fame in 2016.
