= Chris Szarka =

Canadian gridiron football player (born 1975)

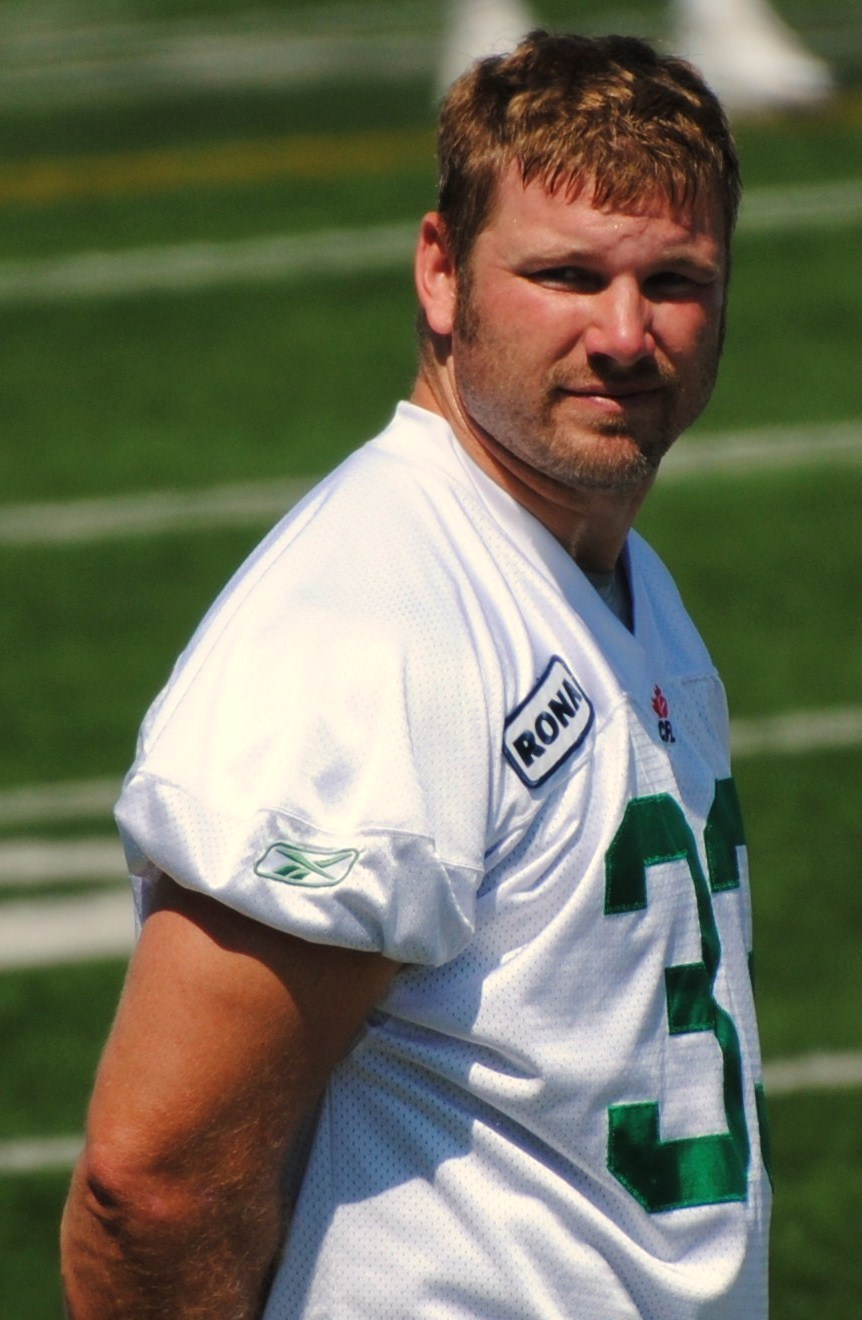
- Szarka with the Saskatchewan Roughriders in 2010

Profile
- Position: Fullback

Personal information
- Born: February 12, 1975 (age 51); Vancouver, British Columbia, Canada
- Listed height: 6 ft 3 in (1.91 m)
- Listed weight: 235 lb (107 kg)

Career information
- High school: Terry Fox
- College: Eastern Illinois
- CFL draft: 1997: 2nd round, 13th overall pick

Career history
- 1997–2010: Saskatchewan Roughriders

Awards and highlights
- Grey Cup champion (2007); Dr. Beattie Martin Trophy (2003)
- Stats at CFL.ca

Other information

City of Regina councillor
- In office 2009–2012
- Preceded by: Jerry Flegel
- Succeeded by: Jerry Flegel
- Constituency: Ward 10

Chris "Canuck Truck" Szarka (born February 12, 1975) is a Canadian former professional football fullback who played for the Saskatchewan Roughriders of the Canadian Football League (CFL) from 1997 to 2010. He also served as a member of the Regina City Council.

== Early life ==
Szarka was born in Vancouver, British Columbia and attended Terry Fox High School in Port Coquitlam, British Columbia, and starred in football and Basketball.

In 1992, Szarka was a Provincial All-Star at running back and helped lead the Terry Fox Ravens to their first ever BC Boys' Basketball championship.

== College career ==
Szarka began his college career at Simon Fraser University. After one season he transferred to College of the Siskiyous; a junior college in Siskiyou County, California. He finished his college career at Eastern Illinois University. He played two seasons for the Panthers. As a senior, he posted 26 carries for 101 yards (3.88 yards per carry avg.), and 35 receptions for 375 yards (10.71 yards per. rec.). His 35 receptions led the team for that season.

== Professional career ==
Szarka was drafted in the second round and 13th overall in the 1997 CFL draft by the Saskatchewan Roughriders. He made his Rider debut in the second week of the 1997 season and dressed for 17 games. He caught his first touchdown pass against Edmonton on July 31, 1997, also his first career touchdown. Szarka also dressed for the 1997 Grey Cup, a loss to the Toronto Argonauts. He otherwise saw most of his time on special teams.

He dressed for 17 games in 1998 seeing time as backup fullback and on special teams, finishing with 10 special teams tackles. The 1999 season was an injury-riddled one for Szarka, as he missed the week 5 game with a shoulder injury. He then re-injured the shoulder in week 8 against the BC Lions and was placed on the nine game injured list. He started in the final game of the season, also against the Lions.

In 2000, Szarka dressed in 16 games as the starting fullback, cementing his role with the team. This being his fourth season, he caught a career-high 13 catches for 174 yards and one touchdown. In the first game of the 2001 season, Szarka got his first career rushing touchdown against the Hamilton Tiger-Cats. He finished the season with 51 carries for 243 rushing yards and three touchdowns. In 2002, Szarka started all 18 games and finished with a career-high 105 carries and 424 rushing yards and five touchdowns. near the end of the season, Szarka was voted by the fans as the most popular Roughrider.

In 2003, Szarka led the team with 12 touchdowns. He was the Roughriders' nominee for Most Outstanding Canadian and also won the Dr. Beattie Martin Trophy as the West Division's representative for the award. After starting all 18 regular season games he finished the season with 87 carries for 324 rushing yards and 11 touchdowns and five receptions for 88 receiving yards and one touchdown. He also had two touchdowns in the West Final and was again voted the most popular Roughrider.

Szarka started 13 games in 2004, missing five due to injury. Nonetheless, he managed to score three rushing touchdowns and one receiving touchdown for 251 yards from scrimmage. In 2005 Szarka had similar yards rushing with 43 carries for 165 rushing yards and three touchdowns. 2006 saw a further decrease in the use of the fullback and, as such, Szarka saw fewer touches with only 11 carries for 37 rushing yards.

In 2007, Szarka finished the regular season with 25 carries for 104 yards and one touchdown. He missed the final three regular season games and the West Semi-Final in a bizarre incident where he accidentally sliced his thumb and index finger while using a table saw in his home. He returned to play in the West Final and the 95th Grey Cup where he got his first Grey Cup ring after the Saskatchewan Roughriders' win over the Winnipeg Blue Bombers. Szarka had an uneventful season in 2008 as he had 10 touches for a combined 55 yards from scrimmage. He also had a fumble recovery for a touchdown off of a muffed punt by the Calgary Stampeders.

In the 2009 season, Szarka led the Roughriders with six rushing touchdowns, including three in an overtime October game against the Stampeders. He had 15 carries for 78 yards and three catches for 20 yards throughout all 18 regular season games in 2009.

On June 1, 2011, Szarka was released by the Roughriders. He did not wish to play for another team and announced his retirement the next day.

== Political career ==
In 2009, Szarka was elected to Regina City Council as councilor for Ward 10. He served one term before being defeated in 2012 by the previous incumbent, Jerry Flegel.
