= Jonathan Brown (gridiron football) =

American football player (born 1975)

No. 91, 92, 93, 97, 99
- Position: Defensive end

Personal information
- Born: November 28, 1975 (age 50); Chickasha, Oklahoma, U.S.
- Listed height: 6 ft 4 in (1.93 m)
- Listed weight: 270 lb (122 kg)

Career information
- High school: Washington (Tulsa, Oklahoma)
- College: Tennessee
- NFL draft: 1998: 3rd round, 90th overall pick

Career history
- Green Bay Packers (1998); Denver Broncos (1999)*; San Diego Chargers (2000)*; Berlin Thunder (2000); St. Louis Rams (2000–2001); Amsterdam Admirals (2003); Washington Redskins (2003)*; Indiana Firebirds (2004); Toronto Argonauts (2004–2009); BC Lions (2010)
- * Offseason or practice squad member only

Awards and highlights
- Grey Cup champion (2004); NFL Europa Co-Defensive MVP; 2007 CFL East Outstanding Defensive Player of the Year; 2× CFL All-Star (2005, 2007); CFL Pro Players All-Star; First-team All-SEC (1997)
- Stats at Pro Football Reference

Jonathan Bernard Brown (born November 28, 1975) is an American former professional football player who was a defensive end in the National Football League (NFL) and Canadian Football League (CFL). He played college football for the Tennessee Volunteers and was selected by the Green Bay Packers in the third round of the 1998 NFL draft. Brown finished his playing career in the CFL with the Toronto Argonauts and BC Lions. He was formerly the head coach for his high school alma mater, Booker T. Washington High School.

Brown was also a member of the Denver Broncos, Berlin Thunder, St. Louis Rams, Amsterdam Admirals, Washington Redskins and Indiana Firebirds.

== College career ==
A 15-tackle, 5-sack game made him a standout Booker T. Washington High School in Tulsa, Oklahoma. Brown was an All-State defensive lineman and accepted a scholarship to Tennessee.

He played at UT from 1994-97 for Tennessee, where he was a 1997 All-SEC selection, a teammate of Peyton Manning and helped the Volunteers win the SEC title in 1997. His 13.5 sacks that season rank second in Tennessee history and his 27.5 career sacks rank fourth.

== Professional career ==
=== Pre-Toronto Argonauts ===
Brown was drafted by the Green Bay Packers in the third round of the 1998 NFL draft. As a rookie in 1998, Brown recorded 10 tackles and a fumble recovery during the pre-season and then played in four games during the season but did not record a stat. After initially making the Packers final roster in 1999, he was released on September 1.

Brown signed with the Denver Broncos and joined their practice squad in December 1999. He finished the season on the active roster but never made an appearance.

After the 1999 season, Brown signed with the Berlin Thunder for the 2000 NFL Europe season. He led the NFLE with 10 sacks, 30 tackles and two forced fumbles. After the season, he was named the NFL Europe Co-Defensive MVP.

During the 2001 offseason, Brown signed with the St. Louis Rams and later joined their practice squad. On October 23, he was signed to the Rams active roster and helped the Rams make a Super Bowl appearance against the New England Patriots. For the season he totaled three appearances with no recorded stats. He was released in September 2002.

Brown was drafted in the first round of the 2003 NFLE Free Agent Draft by the Amsterdam Admirals. For the season he posted a team high 6.5 sacks and 26 tackles and was named All-NFL Europe.

=== Toronto Argonauts ===
He signed with the Toronto Argonauts on May 27, 2004, and became a starting defensive end for Toronto. He started 16 games and missed two due to injury. His debut for the Argonauts came against the Saskatchewan Roughriders in the first week of the 2004 season. In his debut he recorded five tackles. Arguably his best game of the year came in Week 17 against the BC Lions where he recorded four sacks and added seven tackles on defense. Against the Montreal Alouettes in the CFL East championship he had two tackles and recovered one fumble. In the Grey Cup he had five tackles in a Toronto win.

Brown re-signed with the Argonauts for the 2005 season on June 16. He was named a CFL All-Star and an East Division All-Star after recording 13 sacks to finish second in the CFL. Brown started in all 18 games for Toronto all at defensive end. In week 4 of the season he recovered a fumble that turned into his first career CFL touchdown. Against the Hamilton Tiger-Cats in week 11 he recorded his second highest sack total in a game with three. Three weeks later against Edmonton he had three tackles and two sacks. In a rematch against Montreal in week 16 he recorded a sack against Alouettes quarterback Anthony Calvillo which resulted in a safety. Once again, Toronto faced Montreal in the CFL East championship game and Brown recorded two tackles in the Argonauts loss.

For the second straight season, Brown was named a CFL East All-Star in 2006. He led Toronto in sacks with six and for the second straight year he started all 18 games. Brown recorded three tackles, two sacks and was a runner up for the defensive player of the week during week five. He caught his first career interception against Hamilton in week 12. He returned the interception for 29 yards. For the third straight year Toronto appeared in the playoffs. In the CFL East semi-final game, Brown recorded two tackles in the overtime win over Winnipeg. Against Montreal for the third straight year he had two tackles in Toronto's second straight loss in the division championship.

On January 10, 2007, Brown signed a contract extension through 2008. He was named CFL East Most Outstanding Defensive Player of the Year for the first time in his career. He was named a CFL All-Star for the second time in his career and a CFL East All-Star for the third time. He was also nominated as an All-Time Argo at the defensive end position. Adding to his awards he was named a CFL Pro Players All-Star for the first time in his career. Brown tied a career-high with 13 sacks which was second in the league. In week three he had two tackles, two sacks, one forced fumble and a fumble recovery which led to a Toronto touchdown. Against Montreal in week six he had six defensive tackles, one special teams tackle and a sack. He had four tackles and a sack in week nine against Hamilton.

Brown was named a CFL East All-Star for the fourth year in a row in 2008 and was named East Division Most Outstanding Defensive player. Also for the fourth straight year he led the Argonauts in sacks with seven. Against Winnipeg in Week 1, he had three tackles and a sack. Brown recorded four sacks, a sack and a fumble recovery against Edmonton in week six. After recording two sacks in week six against Winnipeg he passed Harold Hallman for most sacks in Toronto Argonauts team history. In the last game of the year against Saskatchewan he recorded six tackles.

=== BC Lions ===
On August 19, 2010, it was announced that Brown had signed with the BC Lions.
