= David Lowry =

British research consultant specializing in nuclear and environmental policy

David Lowry is a British research consultant and anti-nuclear activist with specialist knowledge of UK and EU nuclear and environment policy.

== Early life and education ==
Lowry is a contributing author to a 2007 book on British energy choices entitled Nuclear or Not? In 2001, Lowry was presented with a special award for education at the Nuclear-Free Future Foundation annual awards. In 1987, Lowry was awarded a PhD in nuclear decision-making by the Open University. He previously studied at the State University of New York (1978–79) and the London School of Economics (1975–78).

== Boards ==
He has been a member of the Secretary of State for Energy & Climate Change's Geological Disposal Implementation Board for Radioactive Waste since 2010.

== Publications ==
Lowry has published a large number of articles in a range of magazines since 1980. In 1991 he co-authored a book, The International Politics of Nuclear Waste, covering France, Germany, Sweden, the UK, and the US, published by Macmillan Press. His research and advocacy on nuclear and environmental issues has received media coverage.
