= 2005 CFL season =

Canadian Football League season

- Duration: June 22 – November 6, 2005
- East champions: Montreal Alouettes
- West champions: Edmonton Eskimos

93rd Grey Cup
- Date: November 27, 2005
- Venue: BC Place Stadium, Vancouver
- Champions: Edmonton Eskimos

CFL seasons
- ← 2004 2006 →

Canadian Football League team locations: West, East

The 2005 CFL season is considered to be the 52nd season in modern-day Canadian football, although it is officially the 48th Canadian Football League season.

== CFL news in 2005 ==
New ownership groups took control of two CFL franchises in the 2005 season. The Calgary Stampeders were sold to an ownership group that is led by Ted Hellard and former Stampeder legend, John Forzani. After going through ownership in-fighting, the Ottawa Renegades announced that a new ownership group led by Bill Smith and former Ottawa Rough Riders owner, Bernie Glieberman, would take over the team.

In April, the Toronto Argonauts plans to build a new stadium at York University had been cancelled due to rising costs. However, the owners of the Rogers Centre announced that the Argonauts would be able to remain at the stadium rent-free. Previously, the Argonauts were charged the highest in terms of rent than any other team in the CFL.

Before the season began, the CFL through its partnership with Reebok, introduced new home and away uniforms for all nine teams. Third alternate uniforms were created for all of the teams with the exception of the Toronto Argonauts and the Hamilton Tiger-Cats.

On June 11, the first ever CFL game in Halifax, Nova Scotia is played for the special Touchdown Atlantic pre-season game between the Toronto Argonauts and the Hamilton Tiger-Cats, which ended in a 16–16 draw at Huskies Stadium.

More than 2,303,455 fans filled the stadiums across the country to catch CFL games in 2005, which was a 4% increase from the 2004 season. The 2005 regular season attendance figure also became the all-time highest grossing regular season attendance record in CFL history, by breaking the previous record of 2,229,834 that was set in the 16-game 1978 season. In addition, it marked the fourth consecutive year of national attendance increases for the league.

The 2005 season also saw television audience increases on TSN, CBC and RDS. TSN's CFL broadcast drew an average of 395,000 viewers for its 55 regular season games (and one preseason game), the highest average CFL audience in TSN history. The figure eclipsed the 2004 average minute audience by 27%, with ratings in the male 18–34 demographic specifically, increasing 30% over last season. CFL on CBC recorded a 6% increase in 2005 with an average audience of 462,000 (versus 437,000 in 2004), despite a 50-day Canadian Media Guild strike that left the CBC without access to any announcers between August 20 and October 4. Average audiences in RDS were also on the rise in 2005. With an 18-game schedule, RDS averaged 201,000 viewers (versus 189,000 in 2004), a 6% increase over last season.

On October 28, Saskatchewan linebacker, Trevis Smith was charged with aggravated sexual assault in Surrey, BC for allegedly having unprotected sex while knowing that he is HIV positive. Then on November 18, Trevis Smith was charged with the same offence in Regina, Saskatchewan after another woman came forward alleging that Smith did not tell her that he was HIV positive before they had unprotected sex. A court date has been set for 2006.

On November 27, the Grey Cup game was decided in overtime for only the second time in its 93-year history, as the Edmonton Eskimos defeated the Montreal Alouettes, 38–35 in double OT, at BC Place Stadium in Vancouver, B.C.

=== Records and Milestones ===
Winnipeg slotback, Milt Stegall surpassed Allen Pitts' mark for most career receiving TDs with 126.

Eskimos quarterback, Ricky Ray completed 479 passes, which marked the highest single season total for a quarterback.

Winnipeg Blue Bombers punter, Jon Ryan broke Lui Passaglia's single season average punt record of 50.2 yards by averaging 50.6 yards per punt.

After setting the CFL historical precedent of four receivers on one team reaching the 1000-yard mark in one season the previous year, the Montreal Alouettes again accomplished the feat in 2005, this time with Kerry Watkins (1364 yards), Terry Vaughn (1113 yards), Ben Cahoon (1067 yards), and Dave Stala (1037 yards).

The BC Lions started the season by winning 11 consecutive games and were two wins away of breaking the 12–0 record set by the 1948 Calgary Stampeders. The Lions could have broken the record, but eventually lost four straight games and ended their last seven games by going 1–6.

== Regular season ==
West Division
Pos	Team	Pld	W	L	T	PF	PA	PD	Pts
1	BC Lions (C, Q)	18	12	6	0	550	444	+106	24
2	Calgary Stampeders (Q)	18	11	7	0	529	443	+86	22
3	Edmonton Eskimos (Q)	18	11	7	0	453	421	+32	22
4	Saskatchewan Roughriders (Q)	18	9	9	0	441	433	+8	18
5	Winnipeg Blue Bombers	18	5	13	0	474	558	−84	10

Source: "2005 Regular Season Standings". Canadian Football League. Archived from the original on September 21, 2008.
(C) First round bye; (Q) Qualified for playoffs

East Division
Pos	Team	Pld	W	L	T	PF	PA	PD	Pts
1	Toronto Argonauts (C, Q)	18	11	7	0	486	387	+99	22
2	Montreal Alouettes (Q)	18	10	8	0	592	519	+73	20
3	Ottawa Renegades	18	7	11	0	458	578	−120	14
4	Hamilton Tiger-Cats	18	5	13	0	383	583	−200	10

Source: "2005 Regular Season Standings". Canadian Football League. Archived from the original on September 21, 2008.
(C) First round bye; (Q) Qualified for playoffs
- Due to the cross-over rule, the Saskatchewan Roughriders play the Montreal Alouettes in the Scotiabank Eastern Semi-Final.

== Grey Cup playoffs ==
The Edmonton Eskimos are the 2005 Grey Cup Champions, defeating the Montreal Alouettes 38–35 in an overtime thriller played in Vancouver's BC Place Stadium. It was the first Grey Cup game in 44 years to go to overtime. The Eskimos' Ricky Ray (QB) was named the Grey Cup's Most Valuable Player and the Eskimos' Mike Maurer (FB) was the Grey Cup's Most Valuable Canadian.

=== Playoff bracket ===
November 13: Division Semifinals
East
W4	Saskatchewan Roughriders	14
E2	Montreal Alouettes	30
West
W3	Edmonton Eskimos	33
W2	Calgary Stampeders	26

November 20: Division Finals
E2	Montreal Alouettes	33
E1	Toronto Argonauts	17
W3	Edmonton Eskimos	28
W1	BC Lions	23

November 27: 93rd Grey Cup; BC Place Stadium – Vancouver, BC
E2	Montreal Alouettes	35
W3	Edmonton Eskimos	38*

*-Team won in Overtime.

== CFL leaders ==
- CFL passing leaders
- CFL rushing leaders
- CFL receiving leaders

== 2005 CFL All-Stars ==
=== Offense ===
- QB – Damon Allen, Toronto Argonauts
- RB – Charles Roberts, Winnipeg Blue Bombers
- RB – Joffrey Reynolds, Calgary Stampeders
- SB – Jason Tucker, Edmonton Eskimos
- SB – Milt Stegall, Winnipeg Blue Bombers
- WR – Kerry Watkins, Montreal Alouettes
- WR – Jason Armstead, Ottawa Renegades
- C – Bryan Chiu, Montreal Alouettes
- OG – Scott Flory, Montreal Alouettes
- OG – Andrew Greene, Saskatchewan Roughriders
- OT – Uzooma Okeke, Montreal Alouettes
- OT – Gene Makowsky, Saskatchewan Roughriders

=== Defense ===
- DT – Scott Schultz, Saskatchewan Roughriders
- DT – Adriano Belli, Hamilton Tiger-Cats
- DE – Brent Johnson, BC Lions
- DE – Jonathan Brown, Toronto Argonauts
- LB – John Grace, Calgary Stampeders
- LB – Michael Fletcher, Toronto Argonauts
- LB – Kevin Eiben, Toronto Argonauts
- CB – Omarr Morgan, Saskatchewan Roughriders
- CB – Jordan Younger, Toronto Argonauts
- DB – Korey Banks, Ottawa Renegades
- DB – Eddie Davis, Saskatchewan Roughriders
- DS – Richard Karikari, Montreal Alouettes

=== Special teams ===
- P – Jon Ryan, Winnipeg Blue Bombers
- K – Sandro DeAngelis, Calgary Stampeders
- ST – Corey Holmes, Saskatchewan Roughriders

== 2005 Western All-Stars ==
=== Offence ===
- QB – Henry Burris, Calgary Stampeders
- RB – Charles Roberts, Winnipeg Blue Bombers
- RB – Joffrey Reynolds, Calgary Stampeders
- SB – Jason Tucker, Edmonton Eskimos
- SB – Milt Stegall, Winnipeg Blue Bombers
- WR – Elijah Thurmon, Saskatchewan Roughriders
- WR – Ryan Thelwell, BC Lions
- C – Jeremy O'Day, Saskatchewan Roughriders
- OG – Jay McNeil, Calgary Stampeders
- OG – Andrew Greene, Saskatchewan Roughriders
- OT – Jeff Pilon, Calgary Stampeders
- OT – Gene Makowsky, Saskatchewan Roughriders

=== Defence ===
- DT – Scott Schultz, Saskatchewan Roughriders
- DT – Sheldon Napastuk, Calgary Stampeders
- DE – Brent Johnson, BC Lions
- DE – Gavin Walls, Winnipeg Blue Bombers
- LB – John Grace, Calgary Stampeders
- LB – George White, Calgary Stampeders
- LB – Otis Floyd, BC Lions
- CB – Omarr Morgan, Saskatchewan Roughriders
- CB – Malcolm Frank, Edmonton Eskimos
- DB – Donny Brady, Edmonton Eskimos
- DB – Eddie Davis, Saskatchewan Roughriders
- DS – Barron Miles, BC Lions

=== Special teams ===
- P – Jon Ryan, Winnipeg Blue Bombers
- K – Sandro DeAngelis, Calgary Stampeders
- ST – Corey Holmes, Saskatchewan Roughriders

== 2005 Eastern All-Stars ==
=== Offence ===
- QB – Damon Allen, Toronto Argonauts
- RB – Josh Ranek, Ottawa Renegades
- RB – Robert Edwards, Montreal Alouettes
- SB – Arland Bruce III, Toronto Argonauts
- SB – Ben Cahoon, Montreal Alouettes
- WR – Kerry Watkins, Montreal Alouettes
- WR – Jason Armstead, Ottawa Renegades
- C – Bryan Chiu, Montreal Alouettes
- OG – Scott Flory, Montreal Alouettes
- OG – Jude St. John, Toronto Argonauts
- OT – Uzooma Okeke, Montreal Alouettes
- OT – Bernard Williams, Toronto Argonauts

=== Defence ===
- DT – Ed Philion, Montreal Alouettes
- DT – Adriano Belli, Hamilton Tiger-Cats
- DE – Anthony Collier, Ottawa Renegades
- DE – Jonathan Brown, Toronto Argonauts
- LB – Duane Butler, Montreal Alouettes
- LB – Michael Fletcher, Toronto Argonauts
- LB – Kevin Eiben, Toronto Argonauts
- CB – Adrion Smith, Toronto Argonauts
- CB – Jordan Younger, Toronto Argonauts
- DB – Korey Banks, Ottawa Renegades
- DB – Kenny Wheaton, Toronto Argonauts
- DS – Richard Karikari, Montreal Alouettes

=== Special teams ===
- P – Noel Prefontaine, Toronto Argonauts
- K – Noel Prefontaine, Toronto Argonauts
- ST – Jason Armstead, Ottawa Renegades

== 2005 CFLPA All-Stars ==
=== Offence ===
- QB – Damon Allen, Toronto Argonauts
- OT – Uzooma Okeke, Montreal Alouettes
- OT – Gene Makowsky, Saskatchewan Roughriders
- OG – Dan Comiskey, Edmonton Eskimos
- OG – Scott Flory, Montreal Alouettes
- C – Bryan Chiu, Montreal Alouettes
- RB – Charles Roberts, Winnipeg Blue Bombers
- FB – Chris Szarka, Saskatchewan Roughriders
- SB – Milt Stegall, Winnipeg Blue Bombers
- SB – Jason Tucker, Edmonton Eskimos
- WR – Arland Bruce III, Toronto Argonauts
- WR – Kerry Watkins, Montreal Alouettes

=== Defence ===
- DE – Joe Montford, Edmonton Eskimos
- DE – Brent Johnson, BC Lions
- DT – Adriano Belli, Hamilton Tiger-Cats
- DT – Scott Schultz, Saskatchewan Roughriders
- LB – Barrin Simpson, BC Lions
- LB – Reggie Hunt, Saskatchewan Roughriders
- LB – John Grace, Calgary Stampeders
- CB – Omarr Morgan, Saskatchewan Roughriders
- CB – Malcolm Frank, Edmonton Eskimos
- HB – Korey Banks, Ottawa Renegades
- HB – Eddie Davis, Saskatchewan Roughriders
- S – Richard Karikari, Montreal Alouettes

=== Special teams ===
- K – Damon Duval, Montreal Alouettes
- P – Jonathan Ryan, Winnipeg Blue Bombers
- ST – Corey Holmes, Saskatchewan Roughriders

=== Head coach ===
- Pinball Clemons, Toronto Argonauts

== 2005 Rogers CFL Awards ==
- CFL's Most Outstanding Player Award – Damon Allen (QB), Toronto Argonauts
- CFL's Most Outstanding Canadian Award – Brent Johnson (DE), BC Lions
- CFL's Most Outstanding Defensive Player Award – John Grace (LB), Calgary Stampeders
- CFL's Most Outstanding Offensive Lineman Award – Gene Makowsky (OT), Saskatchewan Roughriders
- CFL's Most Outstanding Rookie Award – Gavin Walls (DE), Winnipeg Blue Bombers
- CFL's Most Outstanding Special Teams Award – Corey Holmes (RB), Saskatchewan Roughriders
- CFLPA's Outstanding Community Service Award – Danny McManus (QB), Hamilton Tiger-Cats
- Rogers Fans' Choice Award – Damon Allen (QB), Toronto Argonauts
- CFL's Scotiabank Coach of the Year – Tom Higgins, Calgary Stampeders
- Commissioner's Award – The Water Boys, Vancouver
