= Richard Karikari =

Ghanaian gridiron football player (born 1979)

No. 8
- Position: Defensive back

Personal information
- Born: July 23, 1979 (age 47); Accra, Ghana
- Listed height: 5 ft 10 in (1.78 m)
- Listed weight: 204 lb (93 kg)

Career information
- University: St. Francis Xavier
- CFL draft: 2003: 2nd round, 14th overall pick

Career history
- 2003–2006: Montreal Alouettes
- 2007: Hamilton Tiger-Cats
- 2008: Calgary Stampeders

Awards and highlights
- Grey Cup champion (2008); CFL All-Star ( 2005); CFL East All-Star (2005); AUS Most Outstanding Player (2002); CIS All-Canadian (2002)
- Stats at CFL.ca

Richard Karikari (born July 23, 1979) is a Ghanaian-Canadian former professional Canadian football defensive back. He was drafted by the Montreal Alouettes in the second round of the 2003 CFL draft. He played CIS football for the St. Francis Xavier X-Men.

In September 2026, Durham Regional Police Service charged Karikari with fraud, alleging more than $650,000 of "irregularities" in Ajax Soccer Club transactions during 2023 and 2024.
