= Thanksgiving Day Classic =

Canadian Football League games held on the second Monday in October

The Thanksgiving Day Classic (French: Classique du jour de l'Action de grâce) is an annual doubleheader held on Thanksgiving in the Canadian Football League (CFL). It is typically one of two days in which the league plays on a Monday afternoon; the other is the Labour Day Classic. Purolator is the presenting sponsor of the event as of 2022.

The Montreal Alouettes have hosted the Thanksgiving Day Classic most years since 1997 and every year since 2006. This was originally started to compensate for not being part of the Labour Day Classic festivities; Montreal and the various Ottawa franchises normally play on Labour Day when both franchises are active. The Alouettes' permanent hosting of Thanksgiving remained in place after Ottawa returned to the league in 2014, with the Ottawa Redblacks serving as the permanent away team since 2021. Through the 2013 season, there were two Thanksgiving Day Classics each year, with the second being hosted by a rotating team; Montreal has been the lone host all but once since 2015, and Ottawa vs. Montreal the lone matchup every year from 2022 to 2025. The Hamilton Tiger-Cats played CFL games annually in all but three years between 1958 and 1982, hosting the vast majority of them; Hamilton also hosted three times in four years from 1990 to 1993 and again hosted Thanksgiving games in 2013 and 2021.

Since the CFL's creation in 1958 through 2026, there have been 127 games played on Thanksgiving Day. The 2019 CFL season was the first and, to date, only time in league history to feature no games on Thanksgiving Day. The league scheduled the Classic for the 2020 CFL season, with one game being played on Thanksgiving Day. However, due to financial issues stemming from the COVID-19 pandemic in Canada, the entire 2020 CFL season was cancelled and this game was not played.

Despite Canadian Thanksgiving being a legal holiday in the United States (Columbus Day at the time), none of the CFL's American teams ever played the Thanksgiving Day Classic during the league's presence there in the mid-1990s.

== 2027 changes ==
In late 2017, a proposal emerged to move the start of the CFL season to five or six weeks earlier than it begins in the present day, so that the Grey Cup would have been held on the third weekend of October, as opposed to the fourth Sunday in November as it was scheduled in 2018. The change, designed to accommodate a potential U.S. television agreement with NFL Network, had support among CFL owners and would have, if approved, taken effect for the 2019 CFL season. If the proposal had taken effect, Thanksgiving Day weekend would have overlapped with the CFL's division championship games. While this change was not implemented and the season schedule remained the same, the league did not schedule any Thanksgiving Day games in 2019. The league has indicated that such a schedule change would have needed to be negotiated in the league's collective bargaining agreement with the players' association. The CBA at the time expired in 2019; at the same time, the league renewed its existing agreement with ESPN, making a schedule change unnecessary, and the new CBA approved that year made no provision for a change.

A modified version of this proposal was eventually accepted in April 2026, to take effect in 2027 along with several other controversial rule changes bringing the CFL's rules closer to those of American football. Under the revision, the regular season will end on Thanksgiving (part of an initiative to build the regular schedule around Canada's holiday weekends, including beginning the season on the weekend of Victoria Day), with an expanded eight-team Grey Cup tournament beginning the following weekend.

== Results ==
=== By year ===
Year	Visiting team	Score	Home team	Score	Source
1958	Ottawa Rough Riders	13	Montreal Alouettes	34	
1958	Hamilton Tiger-Cats	0	Toronto Argonauts	37	
1958	BC Lions	34	Saskatchewan Roughriders	16	
1958	Edmonton Eskimos	19	Calgary Stampeders	14	
1959	Ottawa Rough Riders	28	Montreal Alouettes	12	
1959	Toronto Argonauts	7	Hamilton Tiger-Cats	20	
1959	Winnipeg Blue Bombers	27	Saskatchewan Roughriders	14	
1959	Calgary Stampeders	41	Edmonton Eskimos	23	
1960	Ottawa Rough Riders	51	Montreal Alouettes	21	
1960	Toronto Argonauts	16	Hamilton Tiger-Cats	20	
1960	Winnipeg Blue Bombers	48	Saskatchewan Roughriders	7	
1961	Ottawa Rough Riders	14	Hamilton Tiger-Cats	10	
1961	BC Lions	7	Saskatchewan Roughriders	17	
1962	Ottawa Rough Riders	26	Montreal Alouettes	24	
1962	Edmonton Eskimos	20	Saskatchewan Roughriders	28	
1963	Edmonton Eskimos	17	Hamilton Tiger-Cats	28	
1963	Winnipeg Blue Bombers	8	Calgary Stampeders	14	
1964	Ottawa Rough Riders	1	Hamilton Tiger-Cats	23	
1964	Montreal Alouettes	21	Winnipeg Blue Bombers	20	
1964	Toronto Argonauts	14	Saskatchewan Roughriders	31	
1965	Calgary Stampeders	36	Montreal Alouettes	21	
1965	Ottawa Rough Riders	23	Hamilton Tiger-Cats	25	
1965	Saskatchewan Roughriders	20	Winnipeg Blue Bombers	21	
1966	Toronto Argonauts	9	Montreal Alouettes	8	
1966	Winnipeg Blue Bombers	7	Hamilton Tiger-Cats	8	
1966	BC Lions	19	Edmonton Eskimos	7	
1967	Montreal Alouettes	6	Ottawa Rough Riders	40	
1967	Hamilton Tiger-Cats	21	Saskatchewan Roughriders	22	
1968	BC Lions	13	Montreal Alouettes	4	
1968	Calgary Stampeders	15	Saskatchewan Roughriders	19	
1969	Toronto Argonauts	17	Hamilton Tiger-Cats	7	
1969	Montreal Alouettes	14	Edmonton Eskimos	20	
1970	Ottawa Rough Riders	17	Hamilton Tiger-Cats	24	
1970	Calgary Stampeders	13	Edmonton Eskimos	16	
1971	BC Lions	3	Hamilton Tiger-Cats	36	
1971	Winnipeg Blue Bombers	24	Calgary Stampeders	17	
1972	Calgary Stampeders	30	Ottawa Rough Riders	45	
1972	Winnipeg Blue Bombers	15	Edmonton Eskimos	24	
1973	Winnipeg Blue Bombers	14	Edmonton Eskimos	14	
1973	Ottawa Rough Riders	16	Hamilton Tiger-Cats	13	
1973	Calgary Stampeders	0	Montreal Alouettes	45	
1974	Winnipeg Blue Bombers	19	Hamilton Tiger-Cats	12	
1974	Calgary Stampeders	24	Edmonton Eskimos	10	
1975	Montreal Alouettes	24	Toronto Argonauts	13	
1975	Calgary Stampeders	12	Edmonton Eskimos	21	
1976	Montreal Alouettes	34	Hamilton Tiger-Cats	9	
1976	BC Lions	12	Edmonton Eskimos	16	
1977	Toronto Argonauts	43	Hamilton Tiger-Cats	2	
1977	Winnipeg Blue Bombers	24	Edmonton Eskimos	31	
1978	Ottawa Rough Riders	5	Hamilton Tiger-Cats	25	
1978	BC Lions	15	Edmonton Eskimos	3	
1979	Toronto Argonauts	3	Hamilton Tiger-Cats	42	
1979	Calgary Stampeders	16	Winnipeg Blue Bombers	13	
1979	Montreal Alouettes	6	Edmonton Eskimos	47	
1980	Calgary Stampeders	28	Hamilton Tiger-Cats	30	
1980	BC Lions	9	Edmonton Eskimos	33	
1981	Saskatchewan Roughriders	28	Hamilton Tiger-Cats	12	
1981	Ottawa Rough Riders	6	Edmonton Eskimos	24	
1982	Saskatchewan Roughriders	24	Hamilton Tiger-Cats	24	
1982	Toronto Argonauts	35	Winnipeg Blue Bombers	39	
1983	BC Lions	30	Winnipeg Blue Bombers	18	
1984	Calgary Stampeders	8	Winnipeg Blue Bombers	46	
1985	Saskatchewan Roughriders	14	Hamilton Tiger-Cats	51	
1985	Toronto Argonauts	17	Calgary Stampeders	28	
1986	Winnipeg Blue Bombers	18	Ottawa Rough Riders	16	
1986	Toronto Argonauts	14	Calgary Stampeders	37	
1987	Edmonton Eskimos	20	Winnipeg Blue Bombers	38	
1988	Edmonton Eskimos	17	Winnipeg Blue Bombers	21	
1989	Ottawa Rough Riders	21	Toronto Argonauts	49	
1989	Winnipeg Blue Bombers	7	Edmonton Eskimos	45	
1990	Edmonton Eskimos	23	Hamilton Tiger-Cats	25	
1991	Saskatchewan Roughriders	21	Hamilton Tiger-Cats	42	
1992	Winnipeg Blue Bombers	49	Ottawa Rough Riders	47	
1993	Toronto Argonauts	20	Hamilton Tiger-Cats	28	
1994	Ottawa Rough Riders	24	Calgary Stampeders	28	
1995	Calgary Stampeders	41	BC Lions	27	
1995	Winnipeg Blue Bombers	20	Toronto Argonauts	31	
1996	Montreal Alouettes	25	Ottawa Rough Riders	18	
1996	Toronto Argonauts	23	Calgary Stampeders	30	
1997	Hamilton Tiger-Cats	13	Calgary Stampeders	31	
1998	Toronto Argonauts	40	Montreal Alouettes	13	
1998	Edmonton Eskimos	40	Winnipeg Blue Bombers	20	
1999	Saskatchewan Roughriders	7	Montreal Alouettes	43	
1999	Edmonton Eskimos	26	BC Lions	20	
2000	Edmonton Eskimos	15	Montreal Alouettes	45	
2000	Winnipeg Blue Bombers	40	BC Lions	33	
2001	Saskatchewan Roughriders	13	Montreal Alouettes	7	
2001	Hamilton Tiger-Cats	35	Calgary Stampeders	33	
2002	Toronto Argonauts	29	Hamilton Tiger-Cats	28	(OT)
2002	Montreal Alouettes	48	Edmonton Eskimos	30	(OT)
2003	Toronto Argonauts	15	Ottawa Renegades	21	
2003	Calgary Stampeders	22	Saskatchewan Roughriders	24	
2004	BC Lions	16	Toronto Argonauts	22	
2004	Montreal Alouettes	19	Edmonton Eskimos	39	
2005	Edmonton Eskimos	17	Toronto Argonauts	13	
2005	BC Lions	23	Winnipeg Blue Bombers	44	
2006	Saskatchewan Roughriders	8	Montreal Alouettes	35	
2006	Edmonton Eskimos	23	Toronto Argonauts	28	
2007	Hamilton Tiger-Cats	19	Montreal Alouettes	27	
2007	Saskatchewan Roughriders	33	Calgary Stampeders	21	
2008	Hamilton Tiger-Cats	11	Montreal Alouettes	42	
2008	Saskatchewan Roughriders	5	Calgary Stampeders	42	
2009	Calgary Stampeders	11	Montreal Alouettes	32	
2009	Winnipeg Blue Bombers	38	Hamilton Tiger-Cats	28	
2010	Calgary Stampeders	19	Montreal Alouettes	46	
2010	BC Lions	35	Winnipeg Blue Bombers	47	
2011	Toronto Argonauts	19	Montreal Alouettes	29	
2011	Saskatchewan Roughriders	1	Edmonton Eskimos	17	
2012	Winnipeg Blue Bombers	27	Montreal Alouettes	22	
2012	Saskatchewan Roughriders	36	Toronto Argonauts	10	
2013	Winnipeg Blue Bombers	34	Montreal Alouettes	27	
2013	Toronto Argonauts	18	Hamilton Tiger-Cats	24	
2014	Saskatchewan Roughriders	9	Montreal Alouettes	40	
2014	Winnipeg Blue Bombers	9	Edmonton Eskimos	41	
2015	Toronto Argonauts	25	Montreal Alouettes	17	
2016	Edmonton Eskimos	40	Montreal Alouettes	20	
2016	Calgary Stampeders	48	Toronto Argonauts	20	
2017	Edmonton Eskimos	42	Montreal Alouettes	24	
2018	Calgary Stampeders	12	Montreal Alouettes	6	
2018	Edmonton Eskimos	12	Saskatchewan Roughriders	19	
2019	None				
2020	Toronto Argonauts vs. Montreal Alouettes cancelled				
2021	Ottawa Redblacks	16	Montreal Alouettes	20	
2021	Toronto Argonauts	24	Hamilton Tiger-Cats	23	
2022	Ottawa Redblacks	24	Montreal Alouettes	18	
2023	Ottawa Redblacks	3	Montreal Alouettes	29	
2024	Ottawa Redblacks	12	Montreal Alouettes	19	
2025	Ottawa Redblacks	10	Montreal Alouettes	30	
2026	Saskatchewan Roughriders	24	Montreal Alouettes	44	

=== By appearance ===
Appearances	Hosted	Team	Wins	Losses	Ties	Win %	Streak
40	31	Montreal Alouettes	21	19	0	.525	W4
33	27	Hamilton Tiger-Cats	17	15	1	.530	W1
33	19	Edmonton Eskimos/Elks	19	13	1	.591	L1
29	11	Winnipeg Blue Bombers	18	10	1	.638	L1
28	11	Calgary Stampeders	14	14	0	.500	W2
28	9	Toronto Argonauts	11	17	0	.393	W1
24	10	Saskatchewan Roughriders	11	12	1	.479	L1
24	6	Ottawa Rough Riders/Renegades/Redblacks	9	15	0	.375	L3
15	3	BC Lions	5	10	0	.333	L6

== See also ==
- American football on Thanksgiving
