= Labour Day Classic =

Annual CFL rivalry games

The Labour Day Classic (French: Classique de la fête du travail, branded as OK Tire Labour Day Weekend for sponsorship reasons) is a week of the Canadian Football League (CFL) schedule played over the Labour Day weekend (which includes the first Monday in September). Labour Day weekend, roughly 12 or 13 weeks into the CFL season, is known for its matchups that do not change from year to year, unlike other "rivalry" weeks of the CFL schedule. Labour Day weekend is also one of typically two weeks (the Thanksgiving Day Classic being the other) in the CFL schedule that the league plays on a Monday. Multinational Balkrishna Industries' OK Tire brand is the presenting sponsor of the event as of 2022.

The usual weekend matchups involves the Montreal Alouettes playing against the Ottawa Redblacks on the Friday before Labour Day, with host duties alternating between the two teams. The Winnipeg Blue Bombers then visit the Saskatchewan Roughriders on Sunday and on Labour Day itself, the Hamilton Tiger-Cats play at home against the Toronto Argonauts, while the Edmonton Elks visit the Calgary Stampeders. The BC Lions have no geographic rival and typically have a bye, having played just four times on Labour Day Weekend (2015, 2023, 2024 and 2026) since the return to nine teams in 2014. The Lions most recently played in 2026 against the Alouettes, in Montreal, Quebec.

== History ==
The Labour Day Classic Logo from 2016. Mark's was the presenting sponsor of the event from 2014 to 2021.

The Labour Day Classic began in 1949 and pre-dates the founding of the CFL by nine years. The matchups have remained mostly the same throughout history, except during Montreal and Ottawa's periods of hiatus or due to scheduling conflicts.

During the early 1980s, the Montreal Concordes played the Hamilton Tiger-Cats and the remaining three teams (Toronto, Ottawa and BC) rotated each year. Ottawa and BC faced each other during the late 1980s and early 1990s while the league had no team in Montreal.

Because Ottawa had no active team from 1997 to 2001 and 2006–2013, the Alouettes usually played the Lions during those seasons, creating a "coast-to-coast" rivalry.

Due to the COVID-19 pandemic in Canada, the entire 2020 CFL season was cancelled and therefore no Labour Day weekend games were played for the first time in CFL history.

=== Hamilton ===
Due to scheduling conflicts, the Tiger-Cats temporarily revived its rivalry with the current incarnation of the Alouettes in the Labour Day game for the 2011 season; the change in opponents led Hamilton to dub the game the Labour Day Classique in reference to Montreal's francophone community. Therefore, in 2011, this automatically resulted in Toronto and BC facing each other.

In 2013, the Tiger-Cats' did not host a game on Labour Day for only the second time in franchise history (the first being 1995). It was also the first time that they did not host a game on that weekend. Because Ivor Wynne Stadium was demolished to make way for the new Tim Hortons Field, the team played out of Alumni Stadium in Guelph. The University of Guelph Gryphons (along with most Ontario University Athletics teams) were playing that same day, so the Tiger-Cats could not host the game. To make up for it, the Toronto at Hamilton matchup was played in the Thanksgiving Day Classic.

For the 2016 contest, to avoid any further conflicts with OUA games, the CFL moved the Toronto/Hamilton matchup to prime time Labour Day evening. That year, the OUA's McMaster Marauders football team moved its Labour Day matchup with the Toronto Varsity Blues football squad to Tim Hortons Field, creating a doubleheader with a series of concerts in-between games. This was moved back to a 1:00 pm Eastern start in 2019.

== Related events ==
Although not directly associated with the Labour Day Classic, the week after Labour Day often has a repeat match-up of the Bombers vs Roughriders (see Banjo Bowl), Stampeders vs Elks (see Battle of Alberta), and Tiger-Cats vs Argonauts (a rivalry which began in 1873), with home field advantage now to the team that did not have it during the Labour Day weekend.

As the league has been increasing in popularity in recent years, print ads for the Labour Day Classic try to evoke the tradition of watching Canadian football on the last weekend of summer. Slogans include "Long Live the Rivalries" and "Watch the Team You Love Play the Team You Love to Hate". Some of the teams wear special third jerseys or throwback uniforms if they play at home.

== Current matchups ==
=== Edmonton Eskimos/Elks vs Calgary Stampeders ===
Edmonton victories	Calgary victories

No.	Date	Location	Winner	Score
1	1949	Edmonton	Calgary	20–6
2	1950	Calgary	Edmonton	19–13
3	1951	Calgary	Edmonton	18–17
4	1952	Edmonton	Edmonton	17–10
5	1953	Edmonton	Edmonton	19–5
6	1959	Calgary	Edmonton	16–10
7	1960	Calgary	Edmonton	29–28
8	1961	Calgary	Edmonton	10–9
9	1962	Calgary	Calgary	49–17
10	1963	Calgary	Calgary	16–14
11	1969	Calgary	Calgary	16–14
12	1970	Calgary	Calgary	28–13
13	1971	Calgary	Calgary	23–7
14	1972	Calgary	Edmonton	31–19
15	1974	Calgary	Edmonton	20–16
16	1975	Calgary	Edmonton	35–31
17	1976	Calgary	Edmonton	19–17
18	1977	Calgary	Edmonton	22–8
19	1978	Calgary	Tie	28–28
20	1979	Calgary	Edmonton	27–1
21	1980	Calgary	Edmonton	38–23
22	1982	Calgary	Calgary	32–20
23	1983	Calgary	Calgary	18–15
24	1984	Calgary	Edmonton	30–28
25	1985	Calgary	Edmonton	34–28
26	1986	Calgary	Edmonton	42–19
27	1987	Calgary	Calgary	29–20
28	1988	Calgary	Edmonton	27–11
29	1989	Calgary	Edmonton	31–14
30	1990	Calgary	Edmonton	38–4
31	1991	Calgary	Calgary	48–36
32	1992	Calgary	Edmonton	34–21
33	1993	Calgary	Calgary	33–13

No.	Date	Location	Winner	Score
34	1994	Calgary	Calgary	48–13
35	1995	Calgary	Calgary	51–26
36	1996	Calgary	Calgary	31–13
37	1997	Calgary	Calgary	27–14
38	1998	Calgary	Calgary	26–8
39	1999	Calgary	Edmonton	33–30
40	2000	Calgary	Edmonton	30–18
41	2001	Calgary	Edmonton	33–32
42	2002	Calgary	Edmonton	28–20
43	2003	Calgary	Calgary	28–22
44	2004	Calgary	Edmonton	25–7
45	2005	Calgary	Edmonton	25–23
46	2006	Calgary	Calgary	44–23
47	2007	Calgary	Calgary	35–24
48	2008	Calgary	Edmonton	37–16
49	2009	Calgary	Calgary	32–8
50	2010	Calgary	Calgary	52–5
51	2011	Calgary	Edmonton	35–7
52	2012	Calgary	Calgary	31–30
53	2013	Calgary	Calgary	37–34
54	2014	Calgary	Calgary	28–13
55	2015	Calgary	Calgary	16–7
56	2016	Calgary	Calgary	45–24
57	2017	Calgary	Calgary	39–18
58	2018	Calgary	Calgary	23–20
59	2019	Calgary	Calgary	25–9
60	2021	Calgary	Edmonton	32–20
61	2022	Calgary	Calgary	26–18
62	2023	Calgary	Calgary	35–31
63	2024	Calgary	Edmonton	35–20
64	2025	Calgary	Calgary	28–7
65	2026	Calgary	Edmonton	38–28
Series: Tied 32–32–1

Longest Winning Streak (Edmonton): 7 (1950–1961)
Longest Winning Streak (Calgary): 8 (2012–2019)

Did not play in the following years: 1954–1958, 1964–1968, 1973, 1981, 2020

Television (since 1985): CTV (1985–1986); CFN (1987, 1990); CBC (1988, 1991–2007); TSN (1989, 2008–2019, 2021–2024)

==== Labour Day Rematch ====
Starting in 1989, Calgary and Edmonton have played a Labour Day home-and-home series. The Labour Day Classic game has been held in Calgary on Labour Day Monday, and the Rematch has been held in Edmonton's Commonwealth Stadium the following Friday or Saturday. In 1992, the game in Edmonton was held the week before the Labour Day Classic instead of the week after.

Year	Date	Winning team	Score	Losing team	Score	OT	Attendance	TV
1989	Friday, September 8	Edmonton	38	Calgary	27		41,327	CFN
1990	Friday, September 7	Edmonton	34	Calgary	17		57,444**	CFN
1991	Friday, September 6	Edmonton	51	Calgary	37		57,843**	TSN
1992	*Friday, August 28	Calgary	45	Edmonton	38	OT	31,812	TSN
1993	Friday, September 10	Edmonton	29	Calgary	16		54,324**	TSN
1994	Friday, September 9	Edmonton	38	Calgary	12		51,180**	TSN
1995	Friday, September 8	Calgary	33	Edmonton	17		49,434	TSN
1996	Friday, September 6	Edmonton	20	Calgary	19		40,727**	TSN
1997	Friday, September 5	Edmonton	24	Calgary	20		43,913**	TSN
1998	Friday, September 11	Calgary	30	Edmonton	23		50,856**	TSN
1999	Friday, September 10	Calgary	38	Edmonton	13		52,458**	TSN
2000	Friday, September 8	Edmonton	31	Calgary	10		53,248**	TSN
2001	Friday, September 7	Calgary	34	Edmonton	33		48,279**	TSN
2002	Friday, September 6	Edmonton	45	Calgary	11		61,481**	TSN
2003	Friday, September 5	Edmonton	38	Calgary	0		62,444**	TSN
2004	Friday, September 10	Edmonton	44	Calgary	12		50,366	TSN
2005	Friday, September 9	Calgary	16	Edmonton	11		42,654	TSN
2006	Friday, September 8	Edmonton	35	Calgary	26		47,965**	TSN
2007	Friday, September 7	Calgary	20	Edmonton	17		42,329	TSN
2008	Friday, September 5	Calgary	38	Edmonton	33		46,014	TSN
2009	Friday, September 11	Calgary	35	Edmonton	34		46,212	TSN
2010	Friday, September 10	Calgary	36	Edmonton	20		35,349	TSN
2011	Friday, September 9	Calgary	30	Edmonton	20		45,672	TSN
2012	Friday, September 7	Calgary	20	Edmonton	18		39,363	TSN
2013	Friday, September 6	Calgary	22	Edmonton	12		33,654	TSN
2014	Saturday, September 6	Calgary	41	Edmonton	34		40,852	TSN
2015	Saturday, September 12	Edmonton	27	Calgary	16		38,906**	TSN
2016	Saturday, September 10	Calgary	34	Edmonton	28	OT	35,278	TSN
2017	Saturday, September 9	Calgary	25	Edmonton	22		34,312	TSN
2018	Saturday, September 8	Edmonton	48	Calgary	42		38,611**	TSN
2019	Saturday, September 7	Calgary	33	Edmonton	17		40,113**	TSN
2020	Not played due to COVID-19							
2021	Saturday, September 11	Calgary	32	Edmonton	16		33,493**	TSN
2022	Saturday, September 10	Calgary	56	Edmonton	28		26,946	TSN
2023	Saturday, September 9	Edmonton	25	Calgary	23		32,422	TSN
2024	Saturday, September 7	Edmonton	37	Calgary	16		32,144	TSN
2025	Saturday, September 6	Edmonton	31	Calgary	19		28,365	TSN
2026	Saturday, September 12	Edmonton	53	Calgary	16		31,531	TSN

*Game held the week before the Labour Day Classic

**CFL's Top Regular Season Attendance

=== Winnipeg Blue Bombers vs Saskatchewan Roughriders ===
Starting in the 2004 CFL season, in the week following the Winnipeg vs Saskatchewan Labour Day Classic matchup, the two teams rematch annually in the Banjo Bowl.

Blue Bombers victories	Roughriders victories

No.	Date	Location	Winner	Score
1	1949 - Monday, September 5	Regina	Roughriders	20–0
2	1950 - Monday, September 4	Regina	Roughriders	17–2
3	1951 - Monday, September 3	Regina	Blue Bombers	24–22
4	1952 - Monday, September 1	Regina	Blue Bombers	16–8
5	1953 - Monday, September 7	Regina	Roughriders	23–19
6	1954 - Monday, September 6	Regina	Roughriders	18–14
7	1961 - Monday, September 4	Regina	Blue Bombers	17–11
8	1962 - Monday, September 3	Regina	Blue Bombers	30–7
9	1963 - Monday, September 2	Regina	Roughriders	15–9
10	1970 - Monday, September 7	Regina	Roughriders	30–11
11	1972 - Monday, September 4	Regina	Roughriders	32–21
12	1974 - Monday, September 2	Regina	Blue Bombers	20–18
13	1975 - Monday, September 1	Regina	Roughriders	27–23
14	1977 - Monday, September 5	Regina	Roughriders	26–18
15	1978 - Monday, September 4	Regina	Blue Bombers	31–29
16	1979 - Monday, September 3	Regina	Blue Bombers	28–11
17	1980 - Monday, September 1	Regina	Blue Bombers	32–29
18	1982 - Sunday, September 5	Regina	Blue Bombers	36–35
19	1983 - Sunday, September 4	Regina	Roughriders	32–30
20	1984 - Sunday, September 2	Regina	Roughriders	30–25
21	1985 - Sunday, September 1	Regina	Blue Bombers	18–10
22	1986 - Sunday, August 31	Regina	Roughriders	34–30
23	1987 - Sunday, September 6	Regina	Blue Bombers	29–25
24	1988 - Sunday, September 4	Regina	Roughriders	29–19
25	1989 - Sunday, September 3	Regina	Blue Bombers	28–20
26	1990 - Sunday, September 2	Regina	Roughriders	55–11
27	1991 - Sunday, September 1	Regina	Roughriders	56–23
28	1992 - Sunday, September 6	Regina	Roughriders	32–20
29	1993 - Sunday, September 5	Regina	Blue Bombers	25–24
30	1994 - Sunday, September 4	Regina	Roughriders	42–31
31	1995 - Sunday, September 3	Regina	Roughriders	56–4

No.	Date	Location	Winner	Score
32	1996 - Sunday, September 1	Regina	Roughriders	41–23
33	1997 - Sunday, August 31	Regina	Blue Bombers	43–12
34	1998 - Sunday, September 6	Regina	Roughriders	32–18
35	1999 - Sunday, September 5	Regina	Roughriders	42–17
36	2000 - Sunday, September 3	Regina	Roughriders	38–29
37	2001 - Sunday, September 2	Regina	Blue Bombers	20–18
38	2002 - Sunday, September 1	Regina	Roughriders	33–19
39	2003 - Sunday, August 31	Regina	Blue Bombers	36–18
40	2004 - Sunday, September 5	Regina	Blue Bombers	17–4
41	2005 - Sunday, September 4	Regina	Roughriders	45–26
42	2006 - Sunday, September 3	Regina	Roughriders	39–12
43	2007 - Sunday, September 2	Regina	Roughriders	31–26
44	2008 - Sunday, August 31	Regina	Roughriders	19–6
45	2009 - Sunday, September 6	Regina	Roughriders	29–14
46	2010 - Sunday, September 5	Regina	Roughriders	27–23
47	2011 - Sunday, September 4	Regina	Roughriders	27–7
48	2012 - Sunday, September 2	Regina	Roughriders	52–0
49	2013 - Sunday, September 1	Regina	Roughriders	48–25
50	2014 - Sunday, August 31	Regina	Roughriders	35–30
51	2015 - Sunday, September 6	Regina	Roughriders	37–19
52	2016 - Sunday, September 4	Regina	Blue Bombers	28–25
53	2017 - Sunday, September 3	Regina	Roughriders	38–24
54	2018 - Sunday, September 2	Regina	Roughriders	31–23
55	2019 - Sunday, September 1	Regina	Roughriders	19–17
56	2021 - Sunday, September 5	Regina	Blue Bombers	23–8
57	2022 - Sunday, September 4	Regina	Blue Bombers	20–18
58	2023 - Sunday, September 3	Regina	Roughriders	32–30
59	2024 - Sunday, September 1	Regina	Blue Bombers	35–33
60	2025 - Sunday, August 31	Regina	Roughriders	34–30
61	2026 - Sunday, September 6	Regina	Roughriders	32–26
Series: Roughriders leads 40–21

Longest winning streak (Saskatchewan): 11 (2005–2015)
Longest winning streak (Winnipeg): 4 (1978–1982)

Did not play the following years:

	Saskatchewan opponent	Winnipeg opponent
1955	vs BC	at Calgary
1956	vs BC	at Edmonton
1957	vs BC	at Edmonton
1958	vs BC	at Calgary
1959	vs BC	at Edmonton
1960	vs BC	at Edmonton
1964	vs Montreal	at Calgary
1965	vs Edmonton	at Calgary
1966	vs Montreal	None
1967	vs Edmonton	at Calgary
1968	vs Edmonton	None
1969	vs BC	at Montreal
1971	vs BC	None
1973	vs Edmonton	at Calgary
1976	vs BC	at Hamilton
1981	vs Montreal	None
2020	N/A - season cancelled	N/A - season cancelled

Television (since 1982): CTV (1983–1985); CBC (1982, 1986, 1989, 1993); CFN (1987–1988); TSN (1990–1991, 1994, 1997–2000, 2002–2019, 2021–2024); No TV (1992, 1995–1996, 2001)

=== Toronto Argonauts vs Hamilton Tiger-Cats ===
The Toronto—Hamilton Classic is one of the components of the Harold Ballard Trophy, an award given to the winner of the season series between the Tiger-Cats and Argonauts. The trophy is named after Harold Ballard, who owned the Tiger-Cats for much of the 1980s and owned Maple Leaf Sports & Entertainment for most of that time. A trophy has been awarded to the winner of the series since 1979.

The Toronto—Hamilton contest is officially known as Football Day in Hamilton and has its own presenting sponsor, WeatherTech Canada. For the first several years after Tim Hortons Field opened, Football Day in Hamilton consisted of a Tiger-Cats game as well as a concert and either a McMaster Marauders football or a Hamilton Hurricanes (CJFL) matinée (this tradition has since been abandoned as of the 2020s).

Argonauts victories	Tiger-Cats victories

No.	Date	Location	Winner	Score
1	1950	Hamilton	Tiger-Cats	13–6
2	1951	Hamilton	Tiger-Cats	27–6
3	1952	Hamilton	Argonauts	33–13
4	1953	Hamilton	Tiger-Cats	14–10
5	1954	Hamilton	Argonauts	21–7
6	1955	Hamilton	Tiger-Cats	37–12
7	1956	Hamilton	Tiger-Cats	31–21
8	1957	Hamilton	Tiger-Cats	35–8
9	1958	Hamilton	Tiger-Cats	31–24
10	1959	Hamilton	Tiger-Cats	37–3
11	1960	Hamilton	Argonauts	32–21
12	1961	Hamilton	Tiger-Cats	21–19
13	1963	Hamilton	Tiger-Cats	7–1
14	1964	Hamilton	Tiger-Cats	24–8
15	1967	Hamilton	Tiger-Cats	12–9
16	1968	Hamilton	Argonauts	18–15
17	1971	Hamilton	Tiger-Cats	30–17
18	1975	Hamilton	Tiger-Cats	20–11
19	1978	Hamilton	Tiger-Cats	19–16
20	1980	Hamilton	Tiger-Cats	23–2
21	1987	Hamilton	Argonauts	25–19
22	1988	Hamilton	Tiger-Cats	56–28
23	1989	Hamilton	Tiger-Cats	23–18
24	1991	Hamilton	Tiger-Cats	48–24
25	1992	Hamilton	Tiger-Cats	27–24
26	1993	Hamilton	Tiger-Cats	23–21
27	1994	Hamilton	Argonauts	31–19
28	1996	Hamilton	Argonauts	38–7

No.	Date	Location	Winner	Score
29	1997	Hamilton	Argonauts	46–3
30	1998	Hamilton	Tiger-Cats	26–7
31	1999	Hamilton	Tiger-Cats	35–28
32	2000	Hamilton	Tiger-Cats	42–12
33	2001	Hamilton	Tiger-Cats	26–13
34	2002	Hamilton	Tiger-Cats	22–14
35	2003	Hamilton	Argonauts	19–11
36	2004	Hamilton	Tie	30–30
37	2005	Hamilton	Tiger-Cats	33–30
38	2006	Hamilton	Argonauts	40–6
39	2007	Hamilton	Argonauts	32–14
40	2008	Hamilton	Argonauts	34–31
41	2009	Hamilton	Tiger-Cats	34–15
42	2010	Hamilton	Tiger-Cats	28–13
43	2012	Hamilton	Argonauts	33–30
44	2014	Hamilton	Tiger-Cats	13–12
45	2015	Hamilton	Tiger-Cats	42–12
46	2016	Hamilton	Tiger-Cats	49–36
47	2017	Hamilton	Tiger-Cats	24–22
48	2018	Hamilton	Tiger-Cats	42–28
49	2019	Hamilton	Tiger-Cats	38–27
50	2021	Hamilton	Tiger-Cats	32–19
51	2022	Hamilton	Argonauts	28–8
52	2023	Hamilton	Argonauts	41–28
53	2024	Hamilton	Tiger-Cats	31–28
54	2025	Hamilton	Argonauts	35–33
55	2026	Hamilton	Argonauts	37–22
Series: Tiger-Cats leads 37–17–1

Longest Winning Streak (Hamilton): 7 (2014–2021)
Longest Winning Streak (Toronto): 3 (1994–1997, 2006–2008)

Did not play the following years: 1962, 1965–1966, 1969–1970, 1972–1974, 1976–1977, 1979, 1981–1986, 1990, 1995, 2011, 2013, 2020

=== Ottawa Rough Riders/Renegades/Redblacks vs Montreal Alouettes ===
Ottawa victories	Montreal victories

No.	Date	Location	Winner	Score
1	1949	Ottawa	Ottawa	22–21
2	1953	Ottawa	Ottawa	26–6
3	1954	Ottawa	Montreal	20–11
4	1955	Montreal	Montreal	34–22
5	1956	Montreal	Montreal	42–10
6	1957	Montreal	Montreal	22–21
7	1958	Montreal	Montreal	11–9
8	1959	Ottawa	Montreal	22–7
9	1960	Ottawa	Ottawa	40–16
10	1960	Montreal	Montreal	39–22
11	1961	Ottawa	Ottawa	25–24
12	1963	Montreal	Ottawa	37–15
13	1967	Ottawa	Ottawa	17–5

No.	Date	Location	Winner	Score
14	1971	Ottawa	Ottawa	40–17
15	1978	Montreal	Ottawa	23–18
16	1996	Ottawa	Ottawa	17–6
17	2003	Ottawa	Ottawa	43–38
18	2004	Ottawa	Montreal	23–16
19	2005	Montreal	Montreal	41–18
20	2014	Montreal	Montreal	20–10
21	2016	Montreal	Ottawa	19–14
22	2017	Montreal	Ottawa	32–4
23	2018	Ottawa	Montreal	21–11
24	2021	Ottawa	Montreal	51–29
25	2022	Montreal	Ottawa	38–24
Series: Ottawa leads 13–12

Longest Winning Streak (Ottawa): 7 (1961–2003)
Longest Winning Streak (Montreal): 6 (1954–1959)

Did not play in following years: 1950–1952, 1962, 1964–1966, 1968–1970, 1972–1977, 1979–1986, 2002, 2015, 2019–2020, 2023–2026

Notes
No Montreal team 1987–1995
No Ottawa team 1997–2001, 2006–2013

== Other matchups ==
=== BC Lions vs Montreal Alouettes ===
Lions victories	Alouettes victories

No.	Date	Location	Winner	Score
1	1980	Montreal	Lions	14–6
2	1997	Montreal	Alouettes	26–15
3	1998	Vancouver	Alouettes	26–15
4	1999	Vancouver	Lions	44–23
5	2000	Vancouver	Alouettes	35–25
6	2001	Montreal	Alouettes	23–19
7	2006	Montreal	Lions	48–13
8	2007	Vancouver	Lions	46–14
9	2008	Montreal	Alouettes	30–25
10	2009	Vancouver	Lions	19–12
11	2010	Montreal	Lions	38–17
12	2012	Montreal	Alouettes	30–25
13	2015	Montreal	Lions	25–16
14	2023	Montreal	Lions	34–25
15	2026	Montreal	Alouettes	37–30
Series: Lions leads 8–7

=== BC Lions vs Ottawa Rough Riders/Renegades/Redblacks ===
Lions victories	Rough Riders victories

No.	Date	Location	Winner	Score
1	1981	Ottawa	Rough Riders	17–7
2	1982	Ottawa	Lions	45–13
3	1983	Ottawa	Rough Riders	49–19
4	1985	Ottawa	Lions	18–13
5	1988	Vancouver	Lions	24–11
6	1989	Vancouver	Lions	49–32
7	1991	Vancouver	Lions	24–20
8	1992	Vancouver	Lions	33–27
9	1993	Ottawa	Lions	25–24
10	2002	Ottawa	Lions	28–4
11	2024	Victoria	Lions	38–12
Series: Lions leads 9–2
Ottawa known as Renegades in 2002 and as Redblacks in 2024

=== Montreal Alouettes vs Hamilton Tiger-Cats ===
Hamilton has played and hosted the Labour Day Classic against Montreal (aka Labour Day Classique) nine times in CFL history, including all four years in which the team was known as the Concordes. According to a Hamilton Spectator article, 2011 marked 25 years since Montreal had battled Hamilton in this Classic at home. In previous years, Montreal has played as either the Alouettes or Concordes. The Classique has been a notoriously one-sided rivalry; Hamilton is undefeated in the Labour Day series, and Montreal is winless, with their best result being a tie in the first Classique in 1962.

Alouettes victories	Tiger-Cats victories

No.	Date	Location	Winner	Score
1	1962	Hamilton	Tie	25–25
2	1965	Hamilton	Tiger-Cats	17–2
3	1970	Hamilton	Tiger-Cats	17–12
4	1982	Hamilton	Tiger-Cats	28–9
5	1983	Hamilton	Tiger-Cats	35–30
6	1984	Hamilton	Tiger-Cats	30–11
7	1985	Hamilton	Tiger-Cats	19–16
8	1986	Hamilton	Tiger-Cats	42–7
9	2011	Hamilton	Tiger-Cats	44–21
Series: Tiger-Cats leads 8–0–1
Montreal known as Concordes 1982–1985

=== BC at Saskatchewan ===
Lions victories	Roughriders victories

No.	Date	Location	Winner	Score
1	1955 - Monday, September 5	Regina	Lions	24–23
2	1956 - Monday, September 3	Regina	Roughriders	24–10
3	1957 - Monday, September 2	Regina	Roughriders	28–13
4	1958 - Monday, September 1	Regina	Roughriders	22–14
5	1959 - Monday, September 7	Regina	Lions	35–17
6	1960 - Monday, September 5	Regina	Lions	31–21
7	1969 - Monday, September 1	Regina	Roughriders	32–14
8	1971 - Monday, September 6	Regina	Roughriders	35–14
9	1976 - Monday, September 6	Regina	Roughriders	17–14
Series: Roughriders leads 6–3

=== Montreal at Saskatchewan (since 1949) ===
1964	Monday, September 7	Montreal	0	Saskatchewan	32
1966	Monday, September 5	Montreal	0	Saskatchewan	44
1981	Sunday, September 6	Montreal	26	Saskatchewan	35

=== Edmonton at Saskatchewan (since 1949) ===
1965	Monday, September 6	Edmonton	24	Saskatchewan	22
1967	Monday, September 4	Edmonton	6	Saskatchewan	18
1968	Monday, September 2	Edmonton	2	Saskatchewan	29
1973	Monday, September 3	Edmonton	27	Saskatchewan	28
