= 2001 Winnipeg Blue Bombers season =

Canadian football team season

- Head coach: Dave Ritchie
- Home stadium: Canad Inns Stadium

Results
- Record: 14–4
- Division place: 1st, East
- Playoffs: Lost Grey Cup

Uniform

The 2001 Winnipeg Blue Bombers finished in first place in the East Division with a 14–4 record. They appeared in the Grey Cup but lost to the Calgary Stampeders.

== Offseason ==
=== CFL draft ===
Round	Pick	Player	Position	School/club team
3	19	Ben Wearing	WR	McGill
4	27	Nick Tsatsaronis	RB	Memphis
5	35	Howie Dryden	DB	Manitoba
6	43	Darryl Fabiani	DB	Western Ontario

== Regular season ==
=== Season standings ===
East Division
Pos	Team	Pld	W	L	T	OTL	PF	PA	PD	Pts
1	Winnipeg Blue Bombers (C, Q)	18	14	4	0	0	509	383	+126	28
2	Hamilton Tiger-Cats (Q)	18	11	7	0	0	440	420	+20	22
3	Montreal Alouettes (Q)	18	9	9	0	0	454	419	+35	18
4	Toronto Argonauts	18	7	10	0	1	432	455	−23	15

Source: "CFL.ca". Archived from the original on 2009-06-29.
(C) First round bye; (Q) Qualified for playoffs

=== Season schedule ===
Week	Date	Opponent	Score	Result	Record
1	July 4	at Calgary Stampeders	48–20	Win	1–0
2	July 13	at Toronto Argonauts	30–16	Win	2–0
3	July 20	vs. Montreal Alouettes	37–34	Loss	2–1
4	July 26	at Hamilton Tiger-Cats	24–19	Loss	2–2
5	Aug 3	vs. Saskatchewan Roughriders	32–14	Win	3–2
6	Aug 10	vs. Toronto Argonauts	36–16	Win	4–2
7	Aug 16	at Hamilton Tiger-Cats	20–17	Win	5–2
8	Aug 24	vs. Montreal Alouettes	24–19	Win	6–2
9	Sept 2	at Saskatchewan Roughriders	20–18	Win	7–2
10	Sept 8	vs. Hamilton Tiger-Cats	63–31	Win	8–2
11	Sept 17	vs. Edmonton Eskimos	23–22	Win	9–2
12	Sept 23	at Montreal Alouettes	28–25	Win	10–2
13	Sept 28	vs. BC Lions	23–22	Win	11–2
14	Oct 5	at Edmonton Eskimos	37–33	Win	12–2
15	Oct 14	vs. Hamilton Tiger-Cats	24–17	Win	13–2
16	Oct 20	at BC Lions	26–18	Win	14–2
17	Oct 26	at Toronto Argonauts	12–7	Loss	14–3
18	Nov 2	vs. Calgary Stampeders	22–15	Loss	14–4

== Playoffs ==
=== East Final ===
Team	Q1	Q2	Q3	Q4	Total
Winnipeg Blue Bombers	3	7	10	8	28
Hamilton Tiger-Cats	7	0	3	3	13

=== Grey Cup ===
Team	Q1	Q2	Q3	Q4	Total
Winnipeg Blue Bombers	4	0	8	7	19
Calgary Stampeders	0	17	0	10	27

== Roster ==
2001 Winnipeg Blue Bombers final roster
Quarterbacks: 10 Brian Ah Yat; 8 Jose Davis; 17 Khari Jones; Running backs: 12 Eric Blount; 34 Wade Miller; 20 Troy Mills; 1 Charles Roberts; Receivers: 81 Andre Arlain; 4 Arland Bruce; 84 Bob Gordon; 82 Markus Howell; 85 Milt Stegall; 88 Jamie Stoddard	Offensive linemen: 67 Mike Abou-Mechrek G/T; 59 Brandon Dyson G/C; 57 Brett MacNeil G; 68 Dave Mudge T; 54 Matt Sheridan T; 54 Mike Sutherland C; Defensive linemen: 58 Antonio Armstrong DE; 19 Inoke Breckterfield DE; 97 Doug Brown DT; 90 Denny Fortney DT; 9 Joseph O'Reilly DE; 99 Wayne Weathers DE	Linebackers: 48 Brian Clark; 50 Steve Glenn; 38 Doug Hocking; 36 Lamar McGriggs; Defensive backs: 21 Juran Bolden; 23 Byron Capers; 5 Marvin Coleman; 2 Dave Donaldson; 13 Tom Europe; 0 Harold Nash; 3 Donnie Ruiz; 18 Luke Shaver	Special teams: 6 Bob Cameron P; 7 Troy Westwood K; Injured list: 27 Raphaol Ball DB; 65 Mo Elewonibi T; 66 Rob Lazeo G; 55 Ryland Wickman LB; Suspended: Kurt Murphy C; Italics indicate International player

== Awards and records ==
- CFL's Most Outstanding Player Award – Khari Jones (QB)
- CFL's Most Outstanding Canadian Award – Doug Brown (DT)
- CFL's Most Outstanding Offensive Lineman Award – Dave Mudge (OT)
- CFL's Most Outstanding Special Teams Award – Charles Roberts (RB)
- CFL's Coach of the Year Award – Dave Ritchie

=== 2001 CFL All-Stars ===
- QB – Khari Jones, CFL All-Star
- SB – Milt Stegall, CFL All-Star
- OG – Brett MacNeil, CFL All-Star
- OT – Dave Mudge, CFL All-Star
- ST – Charles Roberts, CFL All-Star
- DT – Doug Brown, CFL All-Star
- DB – Juran Bolden, CFL All-Star
- DB – Harold Nash, CFL All-Star

=== Eastern All-Star selections ===
- QB – Khari Jones, CFL Eastern All-Star
- SB – Milt Stegall, CFL Eastern All-Star
- OG – Brett MacNeil, CFL Eastern All-Star
- OT – Dave Mudge, CFL Eastern All-Star
- ST – Charles Roberts, CFL Eastern All-Star
- DT – Doug Brown, CFL Eastern All-Star
- CB – Marvin Coleman, CFL Eastern All-Star
- DB – Juran Bolden, CFL Eastern All-Star
- DB – Harold Nash, CFL Eastern All-Star
