= 2000 Winnipeg Blue Bombers season =

Canadian football team season

- Head coach: Dave Ritchie
- Home stadium: Winnipeg Stadium

Results
- Record: 7–10–1
- Division place: 3rd, East
- Playoffs: Lost East Final

Uniform

The 2000 Winnipeg Blue Bombers finished in third place in the East Division with a 7–10–1 record. They appeared in the East Final.

== Offseason ==
=== CFL draft ===
Round	Pick	Player	Position	School/club team
1	2	Daaron McField	DL	UBC
4	25	Markus Howell	WR	Texas Southern
5	32	Eric Schwab	DE	Wilfrid Laurier
5	36	Grant Everett	G	North Dakota
6	40	Matthew Sheridan	DL	Manitoba

== Regular season ==
=== Season standings ===
East Division
Pos	Team	Pld	W	L	T	OTL	PF	PA	PD	Pts
1	Montreal Alouettes (C, Q)	18	12	6	0	0	594	379	+215	24
2	Hamilton Tiger-Cats (Q)	18	9	7	0	2	470	446	+24	20
3	Winnipeg Blue Bombers (Q)	18	7	9	1	1	539	596	−57	16
4	Toronto Argonauts	18	7	10	1	0	390	562	−172	15

Source: "CFL.ca". Archived from the original on 2009-06-29.
(C) First round bye; (Q) Qualified for playoffs

=== Season schedule ===
Week	Date	Opponent	Score	Result	Record	Streak
1	July 5	at Montreal Alouettes	38–22	Loss	0–1	L1
2	July 14	vs. Calgary Stampeders	42–38	Loss	0–2	L2
3	July 21	at Edmonton Eskimos	51–49	Loss	0–3	L3
4	July 28	vs. Montreal Alouettes	33–31	Loss	0–4	L4
5	August 4	vs. BC Lions	31–16	Win	1–4	W1
6	August 10	at Toronto Argonauts	41–41	Tie	1–4–1	T1
7	August 16	at Calgary Stampeders	37–16	Loss	1–5–1	L1
8	August 25	vs. Hamilton Tiger-Cats	38–33	Win	2–5–1	W1
9	Sept 3	at Saskatchewan Roughriders	38–29	Loss	2–6–1	L1
10	Sept 9	vs. Toronto Argonauts	24–12	Loss	2–7–1	L2
11	Sept 16	vs. Montreal Alouettes	30–27	Win	3–7–1	W1
12	Sept 23	at Hamilton Tiger-Cats	43–6	Loss	3–8–1	L1
13	Sept 29	vs. Saskatchewan Roughriders	38–30	Win	4–8–1	W1
14	Oct 9	at BC Lions	40–33	Win	5–8–1	W2
15	Oct 15	at Montreal Alouettes	36–30	Loss	5–9–1	L1
16	Oct 20	vs. Hamilton Tiger-Cats	27–24	Win	6–9–1	W1
17	Oct 27	at Toronto Argonauts	32–31	Loss	6–10–1	L1
18	Nov 3	vs. Edmonton Eskimos	30–18	Win	7–10–1	W1

== Playoffs ==
=== East Semi-Final ===
Team	Q1	Q2	Q3	Q4	Total
Winnipeg Blue Bombers	3	2	14	3	22
Hamilton Tiger-Cats	3	8	0	9	20

=== East Final ===
Team	Q1	Q2	Q3	Q4	Total
Winnipeg Blue Bombers	13	3	1	7	24
Montreal Alouettes	0	15	13	7	35

== Roster ==
2000 Winnipeg Blue Bombers final roster
Quarterbacks: 10 Brian Ah Yat; 8 Jose Davis; 17 Khari Jones; Running backs: 23 Scott Deibert; 34 Wade Miller; 9 Cory Philpot; 30 Brad Yamaoka; Receivers: 84 Bob Gordon; 82 Markus Howell; 87 Albert Johnson; 80 Geroy Simon; 85 Milt Stegall; 88 Jamie Stoddard	Offensive linemen: 61 Eddie Blake G; 65 Mo Elewonibi T; 66 Rob Lazeo G; 57 Brett MacNeil G; 68 Dave Mudge T; 64 Gary Sawatzky G/T; 60 Dave Vankoughnett C; Defensive linemen: 40 Bennie Goods DT; 45 Julian Graham DE; 92 Daaron McField DT; 56 Elfrid Payton DE; 98 Ron Warner DE; 99 Wayne Weathers DE	Linebackers: 48 Brian Clark; 50 Steve Glenn; 38 Doug Hocking; 36 Lamar McGriggs; 55 Ryland Wickman; Defensive backs: 21 Juran Bolden; 2 Dave Donaldson WR; 13 Tom Europe; 3 Brandon Hamilton; 18 Spencer McLennan; 0 Harold Nash; 19 Rio Wells	Special teams: 7 Troy Westwood K/P; Injured list: 67 Mike Abou-Mechrek G; 58 Antonio Armstrong LB; 93 Troy Bailey DT; -- Bruce Boyko SB; 6 Bob Cameron P; 44 Patrick Garth DT; Italics indicate International player

== Awards and records ==
- CFL's Most Outstanding Rookie Award – Albert Johnson III (WR)
- CFL's Most Outstanding Special Teams Award – Albert Johnson III (WR)

=== 2000 CFL All-Stars ===
- SB – Milt Stegall, CFL All-Star
- ST – Albert Johnson III, CFL All-Star

=== Eastern All-Star selections ===
- SB – Milt Stegall, CFL Eastern All-Star
- WR – Robert Gordon, CFL Eastern All-Star
- OT – Moe Elewonibi, CFL Eastern All-Star
- ST – Albert Johnson III, CFL Eastern All-Star
- LB – Antonio Armstrong, CFL Eastern All-Star
