= Mike Abou-Mechrek =

Canadian football player (born 1975)

Profile
- Position: Guard

Personal information
- Born: October 14, 1975 (age 51); Toronto, Ontario, Canada
- Listed height: 6 ft 6 in (1.98 m)
- Listed weight: 300 lb (136 kg)

Career information
- University: Western Ontario
- CFL draft: 1999: 5th round, 32nd overall pick

Career history
- 1999–2001: Winnipeg Blue Bombers
- 2002–2004: Ottawa Renegades
- 2005–2006: Winnipeg Blue Bombers
- 2007–2008: Saskatchewan Roughriders

Awards and highlights
- Grey Cup champion (2007)
- Stats at CFL.ca (archive)

Mike Abou-Mechrek (born October 14, 1975) is a Canadian former professional football offensive linemen who played in the Canadian Football League (CFL). He played CIS Football for the Western Ontario Mustangs.

== Season statistics ==
			Defense	
Year	Team	GP	Tackles	Fumble recoveries
1999	WPG	1	0	0
2000	WPG	10	3	0
2001	WPG	18	1	2
2002	OTT	18	3	0
2003	OTT	17	3	1
2004	OTT	9	3	0
2005	WPG	17	1	0
2006	WPG	13	1	0
2007	SAS	18	1	0
2008	SAS	17	0	0
Total		138	16	3
