= Perry Carter =

American gridiron football player and coach (born 1971)

Northwestern State Demons
- Title: Defensive back; Cornerbacks coach

Personal information
- Born: August 15, 1971 (age 55); McComb, Mississippi, U.S.
- Listed height: 5 ft 11 in (1.80 m)
- Listed weight: 194 lb (88 kg)

Career information
- Position: Defensive back (No. 22, 20)
- High school: South Pike (MS)
- College: Southern Miss (1990–1993)
- NFL draft: 1994: 4th round, 107th overall pick

Career history

Playing
- Arizona Cardinals (1994)*; Washington Redskins (1994)*; Kansas City Chiefs (1994–1995); Oakland Raiders (1996–1998); Edmonton Eskimos (2000–2001); Montreal Alouettes (2002); BC Lions (2003)
- * Offseason or practice squad member only

Coaching
- Texas A&M–Commerce (2004) Secondary coach; Hamburg Sea Devils (2006) Assistant defensive backs coach; Houston Texans (2006–2009) Defensive assistant; Houston Texans (2010–2013) Assistant defensive backs coach; North Texas (2014–2015) Safeties coach; St. Pius X HS (2016) Defensive backs coach; Texas Tech (2017) Assistant/defensive quality control coach; Louisiana–Monroe (2018–2020) Defensive backs coach; Louisiana Tech (2021–2022) Cornerbacks coach; Northwestern State (2023–present) Cornerbacks coach

Awards and highlights
- Grey Cup champion (2002); First Team All-IFA (1992, 1993)

Career NFL statistics
- Games played: 28
- Games started: 7
- Stats at Pro Football Reference

Perry Lynn Carter (born August 15, 1971) is an American former professional football player who was a defensive back in the National Football League (NFL) and Canadian Football League (CFL). He played college football for the Southern Miss Golden Eagles and was selected by the Arizona Cardinals in the fourth round of the 1994 NFL draft. Carter played for the Kansas City Chiefs and the Oakland Raiders in the NFL. He also played in the CFL for four seasons with the Edmonton Eskimos, Montreal Alouettes, and BC Lions while winning a Grey Cup championship with the Alouettes in 2002. He is the former assistant defensive backs coach for the Houston Texans.

Pre-draft measurables
Height	Weight	Arm length	Hand span	40-yard dash	10-yard split	20-yard split	20-yard shuttle	Vertical jump	Broad jump	Bench press
5 ft 11 3/8 in (1.81 m)	194 lb (88 kg)	30 3/4 in (0.78 m)	8 7/8 in (0.23 m)	4.44 s	1.58 s	2.61 s	4.17 s	32.5 in (0.83 m)	9 ft 11 in (3.02 m)	11 reps

== Personal life ==
Carter and his wife, Nicole have two children, Bria and Perry Jr. Bria was a four-year track and field letterwinner at Houston and Perry Jr. plays as a wide receiver at Louisiana–Monroe and Jacksonville State.
