= Terry Baker (Canadian football) =

Canadian football player (born 1962)

No. 10
- Positions: Punter, Kicker

Personal information
- Born: May 8, 1962 (age 64); Bridgewater, Nova Scotia, Canada

Career information
- High school: Cobequid Educational Centre
- University: Mount Allison; Acadia

Career history
- 1987–1989: Saskatchewan Roughriders
- 1990–1995: Ottawa Rough Riders
- 1995: Toronto Argonauts
- 1996–2002: Montreal Alouettes

Awards and highlights
- 2× Grey Cup champion (1989, 2002); CFL All-Star (2001); 2× CFL East All-Star (1996, 2001); Nova Scotia Sport Hall of Fame

Terry Baker (born May 8, 1962) is a Canadian former professional football punter and placekicker who played in the Canadian Football League (CFL) from 1987 to 2002. In 1998 and 2000 he led the league in scoring.

Baker played high school football for Cobequid Educational Centre in Truro.
