= 2001 CFL season =

Canadian Football League season

- Duration: July 4 – November 6, 2001
- East champions: Winnipeg Blue Bombers
- West champions: Calgary Stampeders

89th Grey Cup
- Date: November 25, 2001
- Venue: Olympic Stadium, Montreal
- Champions: Calgary Stampeders

CFL seasons
- ← 2000 2002 →

Canadian Football League team locations: West, East

The 2001 CFL season is considered to be the 48th season in modern-day Canadian football, although it is officially the 44th Canadian Football League season.

== CFL news in 2001 ==
The Canadian Football League were able to get new corporate partnerships who bought into the philosophy of "less is more". Television ratings grew again, especially in the ages 13–34 category, in 2001. TSN saw a ratings growth of 55%, while RDS grew by 116%.

The CFL suspended its Week 11 games in respect to the victims of the September 11 terrorist attacks.

The CFL officially returned to Ottawa when they were guaranteed an expansion franchise on October 16. The ownership group led by Brad Watters unveiled the new franchise as the Ottawa Renegades, and began play the next season. The ownership group were also guaranteed the 92nd annual Grey Cup game in 2004.

About 65,255 fans bought tickets to watch the 89th Grey Cup game at Olympic Stadium in Montreal, making it the second largest attendance draw in CFL history.

The Canadian Football League offices in downtown Toronto moved to Wellington St. East, after having their offices at Eglinton St. for the last 10 years.

Records: Saskatchewan's Paul McCallum broke the record for longest field goal in CFL history by booting a 62-yard field goal against the Edmonton Eskimos on October 27, 2001 in a 12–3 victory at Taylor Field.

The Winnipeg Blue Bombers tied a CFL record by winning 12 consecutive games.

The 2001 CFL season, along with the 1999 CFL season, would be one of the closest times when an East Division team could have crossed over to the West Division for that division's last playoff spot since the introduction of the crossover in 1997. The Toronto Argonauts had to only win one more game to go 8–10 (1 OTL), to beat the BC Lions final standings by an overtime loss advantage, or the Lions had to lose a game for the same result. This was settled in the last game of the season for both teams. The opposing team, which was the same team for both, was the Hamilton Tiger-Cats, longtime rivals of Toronto. The Tiger-Cats were defeated by BC, but defeated Toronto, ensuring no crossover. Close wins and losses by both teams against the Saskatchewan Roughriders also played a role in the final standing outcome.

== Regular season standings ==
West Division
Pos	Team	Pld	W	L	T	OTL	PF	PA	PD	Pts
1	Edmonton Eskimos (C, Q)	18	9	8	0	1	439	463	−24	19
2	Calgary Stampeders (Q)	18	8	9	0	1	478	476	+2	17
3	BC Lions (Q)	18	8	10	0	0	417	445	−28	16
4	Saskatchewan Roughriders	18	6	12	0	0	308	416	−108	12

Source: "CFL.ca". Archived from the original on June 29, 2009.
(C) First round bye; (Q) Qualified for playoffs

East Division
Pos	Team	Pld	W	L	T	OTL	PF	PA	PD	Pts
1	Winnipeg Blue Bombers (C, Q)	18	14	4	0	0	509	383	+126	28
2	Hamilton Tiger-Cats (Q)	18	11	7	0	0	440	420	+20	22
3	Montreal Alouettes (Q)	18	9	9	0	0	454	419	+35	18
4	Toronto Argonauts	18	7	10	0	1	432	455	−23	15

Source: "CFL.ca". Archived from the original on June 29, 2009.
(C) First round bye; (Q) Qualified for playoffs
- Teams losing in overtime are awarded one point.
- Edmonton and Winnipeg both have first round byes.

== Grey Cup playoffs ==
The Calgary Stampeders are the 2001 Grey Cup Champions, defeating the heavily-favoured Winnipeg Blue Bombers 27–19 at Montreal's Olympic Stadium. The Calgary Stampeders became the second team in history to have a regular-season losing record to win the Grey Cup. The Stampeders' Marcus Crandell (QB) was named the Grey Cup's Most Valuable Player and Aldi Henry (DB) was the Grey Cup's Most Valuable Canadian.

=== Playoff bracket ===
November 11: Division Semifinals
East
E3	Montreal Alouettes	12
E2	Hamilton Tiger-Cats	24
West
W3	BC Lions	19
W2	Calgary Stampeders	28

November 18: Division Finals
E2	Hamilton Tiger-Cats	13
E1	Winnipeg Blue Bombers	28
W2	Calgary Stampeders	34
W1	Edmonton Eskimos	16

November 25: 89th Grey Cup @ Olympic Stadium – Montreal, QC
E1	Winnipeg Blue Bombers	19
W2	Calgary Stampeders	27

== CFL leaders ==
- CFL passing leaders
- CFL rushing leaders
- CFL receiving leaders

== 2001 CFL All-Stars ==
=== Offence ===
- QB – Khari Jones, Winnipeg Blue Bombers
- RB – Kelvin Anderson, Calgary Stampeders
- RB – Michael Jenkins, Toronto Argonauts
- SB – Milt Stegall, Winnipeg Blue Bombers
- SB – Terry Vaughn, Edmonton Eskimos
- WR – Travis Moore, Calgary Stampeders
- WR – Ed Hervey, Edmonton Eskimos
- C – Bryan Chiu, Montreal Alouettes
- OG – Jay McNeil, Calgary Stampeders
- OG – Brett MacNeil, Winnipeg Blue Bombers
- OT – Bruce Beaton, Edmonton Eskimos
- OT – Dave Mudge, Winnipeg Blue Bombers

=== Defence ===
- DT – Doug Brown, Winnipeg Blue Bombers
- DT – Joe Fleming, Calgary Stampeders
- DE – Elfrid Payton, Toronto Argonauts
- DE – Joe Montford, Hamilton Tiger-Cats
- LB – Terry Ray, Edmonton Eskimos
- LB – Barrin Simpson, BC Lions
- LB – Chris Shelling, Hamilton Tiger-Cats
- CB – Eric Carter, BC Lions
- CB – Wayne Shaw, Toronto Argonauts
- DB – Juran Bolden, Winnipeg Blue Bombers
- DB – Harold Nash, Winnipeg Blue Bombers
- DS – Rob Hitchcock, Hamilton Tiger-Cats

=== Special teams ===
- P – Terry Baker, Montreal Alouettes
- K – Paul Osbaldiston, Hamilton Tiger-Cats
- ST – Charles Roberts, Winnipeg Blue Bombers

== 2001 Western All-Stars ==
=== Offence ===
- QB – Jason Maas, Edmonton Eskimos
- RB – Kelvin Anderson, Calgary Stampeders
- RB – Darren Davis, Saskatchewan Roughriders
- SB – Marc Boerigter, Calgary Stampeders
- SB – Terry Vaughn, Edmonton Eskimos
- WR – Travis Moore, Calgary Stampeders
- WR – Ed Hervey, Edmonton Eskimos
- C – Jamie Taras, BC Lions
- OG – Jay McNeil, Calgary Stampeders
- OG – Andrew Greene, Saskatchewan Roughriders
- OT – Bruce Beaton, Edmonton Eskimos
- OT – Fred Childress, Calgary Stampeders

=== Defence ===
- DT – Doug Petersen, Edmonton Eskimos
- DT – Joe Fleming, Calgary Stampeders
- DE – Herman Smith, BC Lions
- DE – Shonte Peoples, Saskatchewan Roughriders
- LB – Terry Ray, Edmonton Eskimos
- LB – Barrin Simpson, BC Lions
- LB – George White, Saskatchewan Roughriders
- CB – Eric Carter, BC Lions
- CB – Omarr Morgan, Saskatchewan Roughriders
- DB – Eddie Davis, Saskatchewan Roughriders
- DB – Shannon Garrett, Edmonton Eskimos
- DS – Greg Frers, BC Lions

=== Special teams ===
- P – Sean Fleming, Edmonton Eskimos
- K – Sean Fleming, Edmonton Eskimos
- ST – Antonio Warren, Calgary Stampeders

== 2001 Eastern All-Stars ==
=== Offence ===
- QB – Khari Jones, Winnipeg Blue Bombers
- RB – Mike Pringle, Montreal Alouettes
- RB – Michael Jenkins, Toronto Argonauts
- SB – Milt Stegall, Winnipeg Blue Bombers
- SB – Derrell Mitchell, Toronto Argonauts
- WR – Andrew Grigg, Hamilton Tiger-Cats
- WR – Ted Alford, Toronto Argonauts
- C – Bryan Chiu, Montreal Alouettes
- OG – Jude St. John, Toronto Argonauts
- OG – Brett MacNeil, Winnipeg Blue Bombers
- OT – Dave Hack, Hamilton Tiger-Cats
- OT – Dave Mudge, Winnipeg Blue Bombers

=== Defence ===
- DT – Doug Brown, Winnipeg Blue Bombers
- DT – Mike Philbrick, Hamilton Tiger-Cats
- DE – Elfrid Payton, Toronto Argonauts
- DE – Joe Montford, Hamilton Tiger-Cats
- LB – Jason Lamar, Hamilton Tiger-Cats
- LB – Sean Woodson, Hamilton Tiger-Cats
- LB – Chris Shelling, Hamilton Tiger-Cats
- CB – Marvin Coleman, Winnipeg Blue Bombers
- CB – Wayne Shaw, Toronto Argonauts
- DB – Juran Bolden, Winnipeg Blue Bombers
- DB – Harold Nash, Winnipeg Blue Bombers
- DS – Rob Hitchcock, Hamilton Tiger-Cats

=== Special teams ===
- P – Terry Baker, Montreal Alouettes
- K – Paul Osbaldiston, Hamilton Tiger-Cats
- ST – Charles Roberts, Winnipeg Blue Bombers

== 2001 Intergold CFLPA All-Stars ==
=== Offence ===
- QB – Khari Jones, Winnipeg Blue Bombers
- OT – Uzooma Okeke, Montreal Alouettes
- OT – Bruce Beaton, Edmonton Eskimos
- OG – Andrew Greene, Saskatchewan Roughriders
- OG – Steve Hardin, BC Lions
- C – Bryan Chiu, Montreal Alouettes
- RB – Kelvin Anderson, Calgary Stampeders
- FB – Sean Millington, BC Lions
- SB – Derrell Mitchell, Toronto Argonauts
- SB – Terry Vaughn, Edmonton Eskimos
- WR – Milt Stegall, Winnipeg Blue Bombers
- WR – Travis Moore, Calgary Stampeders

=== Defence ===
- DE – Joe Montford, Hamilton Tiger-Cats
- DE – Elfrid Payton, Toronto Argonauts
- DT – Joe Fleming, Calgary Stampeders
- DT – Doug Petersen, Edmonton Eskimos
- LB – Terry Ray, Edmonton Eskimos
- LB – Alondra Johnson, Calgary Stampeders
- LB – Lamar McGriggs, Winnipeg Blue Bombers
- CB – Juran Bolden, Winnipeg Blue Bombers
- CB – Omarr Morgan, Saskatchewan Roughriders
- HB – Harold Nash, Winnipeg Blue Bombers
- HB – Ricky Bell, Calgary Stampeders
- S – Greg Frers, Calgary Stampeders

=== Special teams ===
- K – Paul Osbaldiston, Hamilton Tiger-Cats
- P – Terry Baker, Montreal Alouettes
- ST – Charles Roberts, Winnipeg Blue Bombers

=== Head coach ===
- Dave Ritchie, Winnipeg Blue Bombers

== 2001 CFL awards ==
- CFL's Most Outstanding Player Award – Khari Jones (QB), Winnipeg Blue Bombers
- CFL's Most Outstanding Canadian Award – Doug Brown (DT), Winnipeg Blue Bombers
- CFL's Most Outstanding Defensive Player Award – Joe Montford (DE), Hamilton Tiger-Cats
- CFL's Most Outstanding Offensive Lineman Award – Dave Mudge (OT), Winnipeg Blue Bombers
- CFL's Most Outstanding Rookie Award – Barrin Simpson (LB), BC Lions
- CFL's Most Outstanding Special Teams Award – Charles Roberts (RB), Winnipeg Blue Bombers
- CFLPA's Outstanding Community Service Award – Rick Walters (SB), Edmonton Eskimos
- CFL's Coach of the Year – Dave Ritchie, Winnipeg Blue Bombers
- Commissioner's Award - Robert Wetenhall and Larry Smith, Montreal Alouettes
