= Jay McNeil =

Canadian gridiron football player (born 1970)

No. 50
- Position: Guard

Personal information
- Born: August 20, 1970 (age 56); London, Ontario, Canada
- Listed height: 6 ft 4 in (1.93 m)
- Listed weight: 310 lb (141 kg)

Career information
- College: Kent State
- CFL draft: 1994: 4th round, 34th overall pick

Career history
- 1994–2007: Calgary Stampeders

Awards and highlights
- 2× Grey Cup champion (1998, 2001); 5× CFL All-Star (2001, 2002, 2005–2007); 6× CFL West All-Star (2001, 2002, 2004–2007)
- Stats at CFL.ca (archive)

Jay McNeil (born August 20, 1970) is the president of the Calgary Stampeders of the Canadian Football League. He is a former offensive lineman, playing for the Stampeders from 1994 until he retired after the 2007 CFL season.

== Professional career ==
McNeil was a CFL Western Division All-Star guard in 2001, 2002, 2004, 2005, 2006 and 2007 CFL seasons.

He played in four Grey Cups (1995, 1998, 1999, 2001) for the Stampeders, winning in 1998 and 2001.

McNeil was twice voted by teammates as the winner of the Presidents’ Ring for excellence on and off the field.

He retired after the 2007 season.

== Executive career ==
McNeil served as a trustee for the CFL Players Pension Plan and as vice-president of the Canadian Football League Players Association. He also acted as a community ambassador for the Stampeder alumni association.

In September 2022, McNeil was hired by the Stampeders to be the team's Vice President of Business Operations.

On January 23, 2024, the Stampeders announced that McNeil had been appointed President of the football club, with outgoing president John Hufnagel remaining with the organization and assuming the role of special advisor to McNeil. McNeil is also the Stampeders' CFL Alternate Governor.

== Personal life ==
He resides in Calgary with his wife Tara and his son, Cuyler.
