= Wayne Shaw (safety) =

Canadian football player (born 1974)

No. 29
- Position: Safety

Personal information
- Born: February 14, 1974 (age 52); Winnipeg, Manitoba, Canada
- Listed height: 5 ft 9 in (1.75 m)
- Listed weight: 191 lb (87 kg)

Career information
- College: Kent State
- CFL draft: 1999: 2nd round, 13th overall pick

Career history
- 1999–2001: Toronto Argonauts
- 2002–2003: Montreal Alouettes
- 2004–2007: Hamilton Tiger-Cats
- 2007–2008: Toronto Argonauts

Awards and highlights
- Grey Cup champion (2002); CFL All-Star (2001); 2× CFL East All-Star (2001, 2002)
- Stats at CFL.ca

Wayne Shaw (born February 14, 1974) is a Canadian former professional football player who played as a safety.

== Early life ==
Shaw played football for River East Collegiate in Winnipeg before attending North Dakota State Junior College. In 1997, he transferred to Kent State University and played two seasons for the Golden Flashes, where he made 95 total tackles (75 solo) and had three interception returns for 58 yards.

== Professional career ==
He was drafted 13th overall by the Toronto Argonauts in the 1999 CFL draft. He played in all regular season games for Toronto from 1999 to 2001. He was named a CFL All-Star in 2001, when he led the league with 6 interceptions, two of which were returned for touchdowns.

In March 2002, Shaw signed with the Montreal Alouettes as a free agent. He again played in all Montreal's games including winning the 90th Grey Cup and was named an East Division All Star in 2002.

He signed as a free agent with the Hamilton Tiger-Cats in February 2003 and played until released July 11, 2007, and returned to Toronto for week 4 of the 2007 CFL season. On July 18, 2008, Shaw was released by the Argonauts.
