= ASIST =

ASIST can refer to:

- Aircraft Ship Integrated Secure and Traverse
- Association for Information Science and Technology
- Applied Suicide Intervention Skills Training, a program run by LivingWorks
