= Pat Woodcock =

Canadian gridiron football player (born 1977)

Profile
- Position: Wide receiver

Personal information
- Born: April 27, 1977 (age 49); Ottawa, Ontario, Canada
- Listed height: 5 ft 9 in (1.75 m)
- Listed weight: 175 lb (79 kg)

Career information
- College: Syracuse
- CFL draft: 2001: 2nd round, 11th overall pick

Career history
- 2001: New York Giants
- 2001–2003: Montreal Alouettes
- 2004–2005: Ottawa Renegades
- 2006–2007: Edmonton Eskimos
- 2008: Hamilton Tiger-Cats

Awards and highlights
- Grey Cup champion (2002); Dick Suderman Trophy (2002); CFL East All-Star (2002)
- Stats at CFL.ca

Patrick Ian Woodcock (born April 27, 1977) is a Canadian former professional football wide receiver.

Woodcock attended American College at Syracuse University between 1997 and 2000 and he attended Holy Trinity Catholic High School in Kanata, Ontario. He was signed as an undrafted free agent by the New York Giants of the National Football League in 2001 and made two appearances on special teams, returning six kickoffs for 113 yards and two punts for 16 yards, but was released in Week 3 of the regular season. He was then drafted in the second round by the Montreal Alouettes of the Canadian Football League where he went on to win a Grey Cup with them in 2002. In 2003, he was signed by the Washington Redskins of the NFL but was released by them, and he was then re-signed by the Alouettes. He was signed by the Ottawa Renegades in 2004. In 2006, he was selected in the fourth round (32nd overall) by the Edmonton Eskimos in the Renegades' dispersal draft.

In March 2008, Woodcock signed with the Hamilton Tiger-Cats as a free agent.

He previously held the Grey Cup record for longest TD reception, a 99-yard catch, in Montreal's 90th Grey Cup victory. That record has since been broken during the 105th Grey Cup game.

== Collegiate career statistics ==
Season	Team	GP	Receiving					Rushing					Kick returns			
Season	Team	GP	Rec	Yds	Avg	TD	Y/G	Att	Yds	Avg	TD	Y/G	Ret	Yds	Y/Ret	TD
1997	Syracuse	12	2	32	16.0	0	2.7	0	0	0.0	0	0.0	0	0	0.0	0
1998	Syracuse	11	7	160	22.9	2	14.5	0	0	0.0	0	0.0	0	0	0.0	0
1999	Syracuse	10	24	402	16.8	3	40.2	2	-12	-6.0	0	-1.2	16	342	21.4	0
2000	Syracuse	11	29	453	15.6	2	41.2	6	23	3.8	0	2.1	11	217	19.7	0
Career		44	62	1,047	17.8	7	24.7	8	11	-0.6	0	0.2	27	559	10.3	0

== CFL career statistics ==
Year	Team	Pos.	Games		Receiving					Rushing					Fumbles	
Year	Team	Pos.	GP	GS	Rec	Yds	Avg	Lng	TD	Att	Yds	Avg	Lng	TD	Fum	Lost
2001	MTL	SB	2	0	0	0	0	0	0	0	0	0	0	0	0	0
2002	MTL	SB	15	16	35	838	23.9	95	5	1	13	13.0	13	0	0	0
2003	MTL	SB	7	0	22	222	10.1	30	1	0	0	0	0	0	0	0
2004	OTW	WR	14	0	36	504	14.0	59	2	1	30	30.0	30	0	2	2
2005	OTW	SB	15	0	28	356	12.7	49	3	4	35	8.8	18	0	0	0
2006	EDM	WR	17	0	32	419	13.1	47	1	2	-22	-11.0	-9	0	0	0
2007	EDM	WR	3	0	4	86	21.5	33	0	0	0	0	0	0	0	0
2008	HAM	WR	18	12	21	353	16.8	50	0	0	0	0	0	0	0	0
Career			91	28	178	2,778	15.6	95	12	8	56	7.0	30	0	2	2
