= 2002 CFL season =

Canadian Football League season

- Duration: June 25 – November 3, 2002
- East champions: Montreal Alouettes
- West champions: Edmonton Eskimos

90th Grey Cup
- Date: November 24, 2002
- Venue: Commonwealth Stadium, Edmonton
- Champions: Montreal Alouettes

CFL seasons
- ← 2001 2003 →

Canadian Football League team locations: West, East

The 2002 CFL season is considered to be the 49th season in modern-day Canadian football, although it is officially the 45th Canadian Football League season.

== CFL news in 2002 ==
On March 19, Michael Lysko was relieved of his duties as CFL Commissioner by the board of governors. The board of governors then made chairman of the board, David Braley, acting CFL Commissioner, until November 23 when Tom E. Wright was introduced as the 11th CFL Commissioner in history.

On April 29, Paul Tagliabue became the first NFL Commissioner in history to visit the head offices of the CFL.

The Ottawa Renegades played their first regular-season game on June 28 at Frank Clair Stadium. The Ottawa Renegades were placed in the East Division and the Winnipeg Blue Bombers were returned to the West Division.

The CFL and CFLPA agreed to a new CBA agreement on October 16. TSN reported a 27% increase in viewership of over 50 CFL games. Plus, the CBC announced a record TV audience of more than 5.2 million Canadian viewers for the Grey Cup game between the Montreal Alouettes and the Edmonton Eskimos.

On November 20, four days before the 2002 Grey Cup game, the CFL unveiled a new logo: a red football (with white laces and circles at both ends) located in front of a maple leaf, also red, with black CFL lettering located beneath. It replaced the "helmet" logo that had been in use since 1969. This logo was used until 2015.

For the second consecutive year, the Grey Cup attendance was over 60,000.

== Regular-season standings ==
West Division
Pos	Team	Pld	W	L	T	OTL	PF	PA	PD	Pts
1	Edmonton Eskimos (C, Q)	18	13	5	0	0	516	450	+66	26
2	Winnipeg Blue Bombers (Q)	18	12	6	0	0	566	421	+145	24
3	BC Lions (Q)	18	10	8	0	0	480	399	+81	20
4	Saskatchewan Roughriders (Q)	18	8	8	0	2	435	393	+42	18
5	Calgary Stampeders	18	6	10	0	2	438	509	−71	14

Source: "CFL.ca". Archived from the original on June 29, 2009.
(C) First round bye; (Q) Qualified for playoffs

East Division
Pos	Team	Pld	W	L	T	OTL	PF	PA	PD	Pts
1	Montreal Alouettes (C, Q)	18	13	4	0	1	587	407	+180	27
2	Toronto Argonauts (Q)	18	8	10	0	0	344	482	−138	16
3	Hamilton Tiger-Cats	18	7	10	0	1	427	524	−97	15
4	Ottawa Renegades	18	4	12	0	2	356	550	−194	10

Source: "CFL.ca". Archived from the original on June 29, 2009.
(C) First round bye; (Q) Qualified for playoffs
- Edmonton and Montreal both have first round byes.
- Due to the cross-over rule, the Saskatchewan Roughriders play the Toronto Argonauts in the Eastern Semi-Final Game.

== Grey Cup playoffs ==
The Montreal Alouettes are the 2002 Grey Cup Champions, defeating the Edmonton Eskimos in front of their home crowd 25–16 at Edmonton's Commonwealth Stadium. This is the first championship for Montreal since 1977. The Alouettes' Anthony Calvillo (QB) was named the Grey Cup's Most Valuable Player and Pat Woodcock (WR) was the Grey Cup's Most Valuable Canadian.

=== Playoff bracket ===
November 10: Division Semifinals
East
W4	Saskatchewan Roughriders	14
E2	Toronto Argonauts	24
West
W3	BC Lions	3
W2	Winnipeg Blue Bombers	30

November 17: Division Finals
E2	Toronto Argonauts	18
E1	Montreal Alouettes	35
W2	Winnipeg Blue Bombers	30
W1	Edmonton Eskimos	33

November 24: 90th Grey Cup @ Commonwealth Stadium – Edmonton
E1	Montreal Alouettes	25
W1	Edmonton Eskimos	16

== CFL leaders ==
- CFL passing leaders
- CFL rushing leaders
- CFL receiving leaders

== 2002 CFL All-Stars ==
=== Offence ===
- QB – Anthony Calvillo, Montreal Alouettes
- RB – John Avery, Edmonton Eskimos
- RB – Charles Roberts, Winnipeg Blue Bombers
- SB – Terry Vaughn, Edmonton Eskimos
- SB – Milt Stegall, Winnipeg Blue Bombers
- WR – Derick Armstrong, Saskatchewan Roughriders
- WR – Jason Tucker, Edmonton Eskimos
- C – Bryan Chiu, Montreal Alouettes
- OG – Scott Flory, Montreal Alouettes
- OG – Jay McNeil, Calgary Stampeders
- OT – Uzooma Okeke, Montreal Alouettes
- OT – Dave Mudge, Winnipeg Blue Bombers

=== Defence ===
- DT – Doug Brown, Winnipeg Blue Bombers
- DT – Denny Fortney, Winnipeg Blue Bombers
- DE – Joe Montford, Toronto Argonauts
- DE – Elfrid Payton, Edmonton Eskimos
- LB – John Grace, Ottawa Renegades
- LB – Brendan Ayanbadejo, BC Lions
- LB – Barrin Simpson, BC Lions
- CB – Eric Carter, BC Lions
- CB – Omarr Morgan, Saskatchewan Roughriders
- DB – Barron Miles, Montreal Alouettes
- DB – Clifford Ivory, Toronto Argonauts
- DS – Orlondo Steinauer, Toronto Argonauts

=== Special teams ===
- P – Noel Prefontaine, Toronto Argonauts
- K – Sean Fleming, Edmonton Eskimos
- ST – Corey Holmes, Saskatchewan Roughriders

== 2002 Western All-Stars ==
=== Offence ===
- QB – Khari Jones, Winnipeg Blue Bombers
- RB – John Avery, Edmonton Eskimos
- RB – Charles Roberts, Winnipeg Blue Bombers
- SB – Terry Vaughn, Edmonton Eskimos
- SB – Milt Stegall, Winnipeg Blue Bombers
- WR – Derick Armstrong, Saskatchewan Roughriders
- WR – Jason Tucker, Edmonton Eskimos
- C – Jamie Taras, BC Lions
- OG – Steve Hardin, BC Lions
- OG – Jay McNeil, Calgary Stampeders
- OT – Bruce Beaton, Edmonton Eskimos
- OT – Dave Mudge, Winnipeg Blue Bombers

=== Defence ===
- DT – Doug Brown, Winnipeg Blue Bombers
- DT – Denny Fortney, Winnipeg Blue Bombers
- DE – Herman Smith, BC Lions
- DE – Elfrid Payton, Edmonton Eskimos
- LB – Carl Kidd, BC Lions
- LB – Brendan Ayanbadejo, BC Lions
- LB – Barrin Simpson, BC Lions
- CB – Eric Carter, BC Lions
- CB – Omarr Morgan, Saskatchewan Roughriders
- DB – Harold Nash, Winnipeg Blue Bombers
- DB – Bo Lewis, BC Lions
- DS – Tom Europe, Winnipeg Blue Bombers

=== Special teams ===
- P – Duncan O'Mahony, Calgary Stampeders
- K – Sean Fleming, Edmonton Eskimos
- ST – Corey Holmes, Saskatchewan Roughriders

== 2002 Eastern All-Stars ==
=== Offence ===
- QB – Anthony Calvillo, Montreal Alouettes
- RB – Troy Davis Hamilton Tiger-Cats
- RB – Lawrence Phillips, Montreal Alouettes
- SB – Ben Cahoon, Montreal Alouettes
- SB – Derrell Mitchell, Toronto Argonauts
- WR – Pat Woodcock, Montreal Alouettes
- WR – Jimmy Oliver, Ottawa Renegades
- C – Bryan Chiu, Montreal Alouettes
- OG – Scott Flory, Montreal Alouettes
- OG – Sandy Annunziata, Toronto Argonauts
- OT – Uzooma Okeke, Montreal Alouettes
- OT – Dave Hack, Hamilton Tiger-Cats

=== Defence ===
- DT – Robert Brown, Montreal Alouettes
- DT – Johnny Scott, Toronto Argonauts
- DE – Joe Montford, Toronto Argonauts
- DE – Marc Megna, Montreal Alouettes
- LB – John Grace, Ottawa Renegades
- LB – Stefen Reid, Montreal Alouettes
- LB – Kevin Johnson, Montreal Alouettes
- CB – Adrion Smith, Toronto Argonauts
- CB – Wayne Shaw, Montreal Alouettes
- DB – Barron Miles, Montreal Alouettes
- DB – Clifford Ivory, Toronto Argonauts
- DS – Rob Hitchcock, Hamilton Tiger-Cats

=== Special teams ===
- P – Noel Prefontaine, Toronto Argonauts
- K – Noel Prefontaine, Toronto Argonauts
- ST – Keith Stokes, Montreal Alouettes

== 2002 CFLPA All-Stars ==
=== Offence ===
- QB – Anthony Calvillo, Montreal Alouettes
- OT – Uzooma Okeke, Montreal Alouettes
- OT – Dave Mudge, Winnipeg Blue Bombers
- OG – Andrew Greene, Saskatchewan Roughriders
- OG – Steve Hardin, BC Lions
- C – Bryan Chiu, Montreal Alouettes
- RB – John Avery, Edmonton Eskimos
- FB – Mike Sellers, Winnipeg Blue Bombers
- SB – Milt Stegall, Winnipeg Blue Bombers
- SB – Terry Vaughn, Edmonton Eskimos
- WR – Arland Bruce, Winnipeg Blue Bombers
- WR – Ben Cahoon, Montreal Alouettes

=== Defence ===
- DE – Herman Smith, BC Lions
- DE – Elfrid Payton, Edmonton Eskimos
- DT – Robert Brown, Montreal Alouettes
- DT – Johnny Scott, Toronto Argonauts
- LB – Barrin Simpson, BC Lions
- LB – Alondra Johnson, Calgary Stampeders
- LB – Kevin Johnson, Montreal Alouettes
- CB – Omarr Morgan, Saskatchewan Roughriders
- CB – Marvin Coleman, Winnipeg Blue Bombers
- HB – Gerald Vaughn, Ottawa Renegades
- HB – Barron Miles, Montreal Alouettes
- S – Rob Hitchcock, Hamilton Tiger-Cats

=== Special teams ===
- K – Sean Fleming, Edmonton Eskimos
- P – Noel Prefontaine, Toronto Argonauts
- ST – Keith Stokes, Montreal Alouettes

=== Head coach ===
- Don Matthews, Montreal Alouettes

== 2002 CFLPA Western All-Stars ==
=== Offence ===
- QB – Khari Jones, Winnipeg Blue Bombers
- OT – Dave Mudge, Winnipeg Blue Bombers
- OT – Bruce Beaton, Edmonton Eskimos
- OG – Andrew Greene Saskatchewan Roughriders
- OG – Steve Hardin, BC Lions
- C – Jamie Taras, BC Lions
- RB – John Avery, Edmonton Eskimos
- FB – Mike Sellers, Winnipeg Blue Bombers
- SB – Terry Vaughn, Edmonton Eskimos
- SB – Milt Stegall, Winnipeg Blue Bombers
- WR – Arland Bruce, Winnipeg Blue Bombers
- WR – Ed Hervey, Edmonton Eskimos

=== Defence ===
- DE – Herman Smith, BC Lions
- DE – Elfrid Payton, Edmonton Eskimos
- DT – Doug Brown, Winnipeg Blue Bombers
- DT – Nate Davis, Saskatchewan Roughriders
- LB – Barrin Simpson, BC Lions
- LB – Alondra Johnson, Calgary Stampeders
- LB – Terry Ray, Edmonton Eskimos
- CB – Omarr Morgan, Saskatchewan Roughriders
- CB – Marvin Coleman, Winnipeg Blue Bombers
- HB – Derrick Lewis, BC Lions
- HB – Eric Carter, BC Lions
- S – Greg Frers, Calgary Stampeders

=== Special teams ===
- K – Sean Fleming, Edmonton Eskimos
- P – Sean Fleming, Edmonton Eskimos
- ST – Brendan Ayanbadejo, BC Lions

=== Head coach ===
- Danny Barrett, Saskatchewan Roughriders

== 2002 CFLPA Eastern All-Stars ==
=== Offence ===
- QB – Anthony Calvillo, Montreal Alouettes
- OT – Uzooma Okeke, Montreal Alouettes
- OT – Neal Fort, Montreal Alouettes
- OT – Val St. Germain, Ottawa Renegades
- OG – Scott Flory, Montreal Alouettes
- C – Bryan Chiu, Montreal Alouettes
- RB – Lawrence Phillips, Montreal Alouettes
- FB – Bruno Heppell, Montreal Alouettes
- SB – Derrell Mitchell, Toronto Argonauts
- SB – Archie Amerson, Hamilton Tiger-Cats
- WR – Ben Cahoon, Montreal Alouettes
- WR – Tony Miles Hamilton Tiger-Cats

=== Defence ===
- DE – Joe Montford, Toronto Argonauts
- DE – Michael Boireau, Ottawa Renegades
- DT – Robert Brown, Montreal Alouettes
- DT – Johnny Scott, Toronto Argonauts
- LB – Kevin Johnson, Montreal Alouettes
- LB – John Grace, Ottawa Renegades
- LB – Chris Shelling, Hamilton Tiger-Cats
- CB – Perry Carter, Montreal Alouettes
- CB – Ricky Bell, Ottawa Renegades
- HB – Gerald Vaughn, Ottawa Renegades
- HB – Barron Miles, Montreal Alouettes
- S – Rob Hitchcock, Hamilton Tiger-Cats

=== Special teams ===
- K – Noel Prefontaine, Toronto Argonauts
- P – Noel Prefontaine, Toronto Argonauts
- ST – Keith Stokes, Montreal Alouettes

=== Head coach ===
- Don Matthews, Montreal Alouettes

== 2002 CFL awards ==
- CFL's Most Outstanding Player Award – Milt Stegall (SB), Winnipeg Blue Bombers
- CFL's Most Outstanding Canadian Award – Ben Cahoon (WR), Montreal Alouettes
- CFL's Most Outstanding Defensive Player Award – Elfrid Payton (DE), Edmonton Eskimos
- CFL's Most Outstanding Offensive Lineman Award – Bryan Chiu (C), Montreal Alouettes
- CFL's Most Outstanding Rookie Award – Jason Clermont (SB), BC Lions
- CFL's Most Outstanding Special Teams Award – Corey Holmes (RB), Saskatchewan Roughriders
- CFLPA's Outstanding Community Service Award – Greg Frers (DS), Calgary Stampeders
- CFL's Coach of the Year – Don Matthews, Montreal Alouettes
- Commissioner's Award - Hugh Campbell, Edmonton
