= Milt Stegall =

American gridiron football player (born 1970)

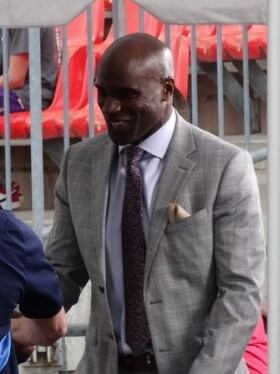
- Stegall in 2022

No. 84, 85
- Positions: Wide receiver, slotback

Personal information
- Born: January 25, 1970 (age 56); Cincinnati, Ohio, U.S.
- Listed height: 6 ft 0 in (1.83 m)
- Listed weight: 184 lb (83 kg)

Career information
- High school: Roger Bacon (St. Bernard, Ohio)
- College: Miami (OH)
- NFL draft: 1992: undrafted

Career history
- Cincinnati Bengals (1992–1994); Green Bay Packers (1995)*; Winnipeg Blue Bombers (1995–1998); New Orleans Saints (1998)*; Winnipeg Blue Bombers (1999–2008)
- * Offseason or practice squad member only

Awards and highlights
- CFL's Most Outstanding Player Award (2002); Jeff Nicklin Memorial Trophy (2002); Tom Pate Memorial Award (2007); 9× CFL All-Star (1997, 2000–2007); Winnipeg Blue Bombers Hall of Fame (2016)

Career NFL statistics
- Receptions: 4
- Receiving yards: 43
- Touchdowns: 1
- Stats at Pro Football Reference

Career CFL statistics
- Receptions: 854
- Receiving yards: 15,153
- Touchdowns: 147
- Stats at CFL.ca (archived)
- Canadian Football Hall of Fame

Milton Eugene Stegall (born January 25, 1970) is an American former professional football player who played 14 years in the Canadian Football League (CFL) and three years in the National Football League (NFL). He is currently an analyst on the CFL on TSN studio panel.

Stegall was an All-Star receiver for the Winnipeg Blue Bombers of the CFL. Spanning a 14-year career from 1995 to 2008, he held several major CFL records upon his retirement including most career receiving yards, and currently holds the record for career receiving touchdowns and most touchdowns scored. In 2012, he was elected into the Canadian Football Hall of Fame.

== Early life ==
Stegall was born in Cincinnati, the fifth of five children of Betty Stegall (1935 - 2020) and Garland J. Stegall (1922–1987). He attended Roger Bacon High School, where he was an All-State football player, All-City basketball player and qualified for the state track meet his senior year. Stegall started playing football at age 4 for now defunct Parchman & Oyler Pop Warner Football. During a three-year span (ages 8–10), Stegall scored 87 touchdowns playing running back, a record still held today.

== College career ==
Stegall attended Miami University, where he was a four-year football letterman from 1988 to 1991. Stegall finished with 106 receptions for 1,581 yards, and eight touchdowns as a wide receiver. Because of his speed (he competed on Miami's track and field team where he holds the 3rd fastest 100 meter dash, 10.44 seconds, and 5th fastest 200 meter dash, 21.24 seconds) he was also a dynamic tap dancer, and kick returner, setting a career record of 1,377 kick return yards which lasted until 2002, beaten by defensive back Milt Bowen, who like Stegall signed with the Cincinnati Bengals after college. All of these accomplishments garnered Stegall an honorable mention all-Mid-American Conference selection as a junior.

== Professional career ==
=== Cincinnati Bengals ===
Stegall signed as an undrafted free agent with the Cincinnati Bengals. He played 21 games over 3 seasons, where he had four receptions for 43 yards and one touchdown. He was primarily played as a kick returner though, where he totaled 446 yards off of 26 kickoffs and made five tackles on special teams.

=== Green Bay Packers ===
In the 1995 season, he was signed as a free agent by the Green Bay Packers, but was a late cut after a serious knee injury during the final days of training camp.

=== Winnipeg Blue Bombers (first stint) ===
In 1995, Stegall decided to go north to the Canadian Football League and signed with the Winnipeg Blue Bombers where he played the final 6 games of the 1995 CFL season, with 469 receiving yards, and two punt returns, one for 80 yards. In his first full season in 1996, he gained 613 yards receiving on 34 catches for 6 touchdowns.

Stegall started out as a slotback/wide receiver, garnering him an All-Star selection in the 1997 season after having a 1,616 yard season.

=== New Orleans Saints ===
Stegall signed with the New Orleans Saints February 10, 1998. He was later released on August 25, 1998.

=== Winnipeg Blue Bombers (second stint) ===
Stegall re-signed with Winnipeg on September 18, 1998. He made the switch to slotback permanently which let him start the play closer to the middle of the larger field. Stegall flourished as a slotback, where in the CFL a player is allowed a running start before the play to gain momentum, being able to outrun defenders with his impressive speed. Stegall would go on to get 3 more All-Star selections as a slotback, peaking in 2002 where he had one of the greatest individual seasons in CFL history. He led the CFL in receptions (106), receiving yards (1,896), yards from scrimmage (1,896), touchdowns (23), receiving touchdowns (23), 100-yard games (10), 100-yard receiving games (10), average yards per catch (17.9) and non-kicker scoring (140). He set a new league single-season record for touchdowns with 23 and a new league single-season record for receiving touchdowns, also with 23. All of these made him the obvious choice as the CFL's Most Outstanding Player.

Stegall continued his excellence throughout the seasons with the Blue Bombers. Throughout his career, Stegall led the CFL in receptions once, he twice led the league in receiving yards and he led the league in touchdown receptions 5 times. In 2005 at age 35, some thought Stegall's play would be on the decline, but he shrugged off critics by capping off the season with his 5th All-Star selection. Amidst endless offensive coordinator changes, as well as many head coach changes, Stegall still remained a reliable, and at times unstoppable force for the Blue Bombers. Arguably one of the most popular Bombers of all time he was named to the All-Time 75th Anniversary Team. With the 2005 season over, there was speculation that Stegall would retire, but he soon announced that he would in fact return.

On July 20, 2006, Stegall scored the winning 100-yard touchdown reception to lead the Blue Bombers to a 25–22 victory over the Edmonton Eskimos with no time left. It has been dubbed the "Miracle Catch" by many Blue Bomber fans. In addition to the last play heroics, Stegall had 254 yards receiving in the game, and many regard his performance that day as the best of his career. Despite a successful 2006 campaign for Stegall, the Blue Bombers once again failed to achieve playoff success. After more retirement speculation, Stegall announced in December of 2006 that he would return to the Blue Bombers for, at least, one more year.

On June 28, 2007, Milt Stegall scored the game-tying touchdown versus the Edmonton Eskimos to tie the all-time touchdown record, shared with George Reed and Mike Pringle at 137 Touchdowns. In the 5th game of the Bombers' 2007 season, July 27, 2007, Stegall became the all-time CFL touchdown leader on a 1-yard pass originally designed as a running play for the occasion, surpassing running backs Mike Pringle and George Reed, and went on to score another major before the end of the game to bring his total up to that point to 139 touchdowns.

Stegall had said that he was 99.9% sure that he was going to retire after then 2007 season but on January 31, 2008, announced he was returning to the Bombers for another year. On September 12, 2008, Stegall initially tied Allen Pitts with a 16-yard touchdown reception to become the CFL's all-time leader in career receiving yards. Shortly thereafter, Stegall surpassed Pitts with a highlight reel 92-yard touchdown catch and run, totaling 14,982 yards in his career. On June 29, 2012, he was surpassed by Geroy Simon of the BC Lions and is currently second in career receiving yards at 15,153 yards.

Although Stegall played in the CFL for many years, has accomplished impressive numbers, and is considered by many to be one of the greatest receivers in CFL history, Stegall never won the Grey Cup - despite reaching Grey Cup game twice: the 89th Grey Cup vs. Calgary and 95th Grey Cup vs. Saskatchewan.

Stegall officially retired from professional football on February 18, 2009. He retired with CFL records for career touchdowns (147), career receiving touchdowns (144), and receiving yards (15,153).

== Legacy ==
On August 24, 2007, the premier of Manitoba honoured Stegall with the Order of the Buffalo Hunt. In addition, the mayor of Winnipeg honoured Stegall with the key to the city. He also was honoured with a street in Winnipeg adjacent to Canad Inns Stadium formerly called Arena Road (in reference to the former Winnipeg Arena) which was renamed Milt Stegall Drive.

Stegall was inducted into the Canadian Football Hall of Fame in 2012. On August 3, 2016, at halftime of the Blue Bombers home game against the Tiger-Cats, he was inducted into the Winnipeg Blue Bombers Ring of Honour.

In recognition of Stegall's contributions to the community and the province of Manitoba, the Manitoba Foundation for Sports provides scholarships to young athletes in his name through the MFFS Milt Stegall Scholarship.

== CFL career statistics ==
Receiving		Regular season						Playoffs
Year	Team	Games	No.	Yards	Avg	Long	TD	Games	No.	Yards	Avg	Long	TD
1992	CIN	16	3	35	11.7	13	1	Team did not qualify
1993	CIN	4	1	8	8.0	8	0	Team did not qualify
1994	CIN	1	0	0	0.0	0	0	Team did not qualify
1995	WPG	6	25	469	18.8	51	4	1	5	78	15.6	28	0
1996	WPG	11	34	613	18.0	54	6	1	1	5	5.0	5	0
1997	WPG	18	61	1616	26.5	105	14	Team did not qualify
1998	WPG	7	32	403	12.6	62	6	Team did not qualify
1999	WPG	13	73	1193	16.3	99	6	Team did not qualify
2000	WPG	16	78	1499	19.2	86	15	2	9	140	15.6	31	2
2001	WPG	16	81	1214	15.0	79	14	2	9	199	22.1	70	2
2002	WPG	18	105	1862	17.7	83	23
2003	WPG	18	68	1144	16.8	73	15	1	0	0	0.0	0	0
2004	WPG	16	68	1121	16.5	67	6	Team did not qualify
2005	WPG	17	52	1184	22.8	101	17	Team did not qualify
2006	WPG	14	79	1269	16.1	100	7	1	2	76	38.0	59	0
2007	WPG	17	69	1108	16.1	49	8	3	13	181	13.9	42	2
2008	WPG	12	29	458	15.8	92	3	1	5	56	11.2	16	0
NFL totals		21	4	43	10.8	13	1
CFL totals		199	854	15,153	17.7	105	144	12	44	735	16.7	70	6

== Career highlights ==
=== Awards and honors ===
- Most Outstanding Player Award (2002)
- Jeff Nicklin Memorial Trophy (2002)
- Tom Pate Memorial Award (2007)
- 9× CFL All-Star (1997, 2000–2007)
- Winnipeg Blue Bombers Ring of Honour (2016)
- Canadian Football Hall of Fame (2012)

=== CFL records ===
- Most TDs in a career – 147
- Most TD receptions in a career – 144
- Most TDs in one season – 23 (2002)
- Most TD receptions in one season – 23 (2002)
- Most yards per catch in a season – 26.5 (1997)
- Most yards in one season by a Bombers receiver – 1,862 (2002)
- Most 1000+ yard receiving seasons by a Bombers receiver – 10
- Most career yards receiving by a Bombers receiver −15,153
- CFL Most Outstanding Player – 2002
- Named as receiver in top passing tandem in CFL history together with Khari Jones
- In 2006 was named 15th on the CFL's Top 50 players of the modern era by Canadian sports network TSN.

== Media personality ==
Stegall is one of the most popular CFL players among the media. He was voted the best looking man in the CFL. He often received praise from his teammates for his work ethic, personality, and leadership.

In June 2009, it was announced that Stegall would join TSN as an analyst for their CFL broadcasts throughout the 2009 CFL season. Stegall remains a prominent member of the CFL analyst panel on CFL on TSN broadcasts.

== Personal life ==
Stegall and his wife Darlene are the parents of sons Chase and Colin. He currently lives in Atlanta, Georgia. He made it clear one of the conditions he would hold off retirement and return to playing was if his wife gave birth to their second son Colin in Winnipeg. His older son Chase was a student at DePaul University and a midfielder for their men's soccer team before his death in June 2025.
