= Omarr Morgan =

American gridiron football player (born 1976)

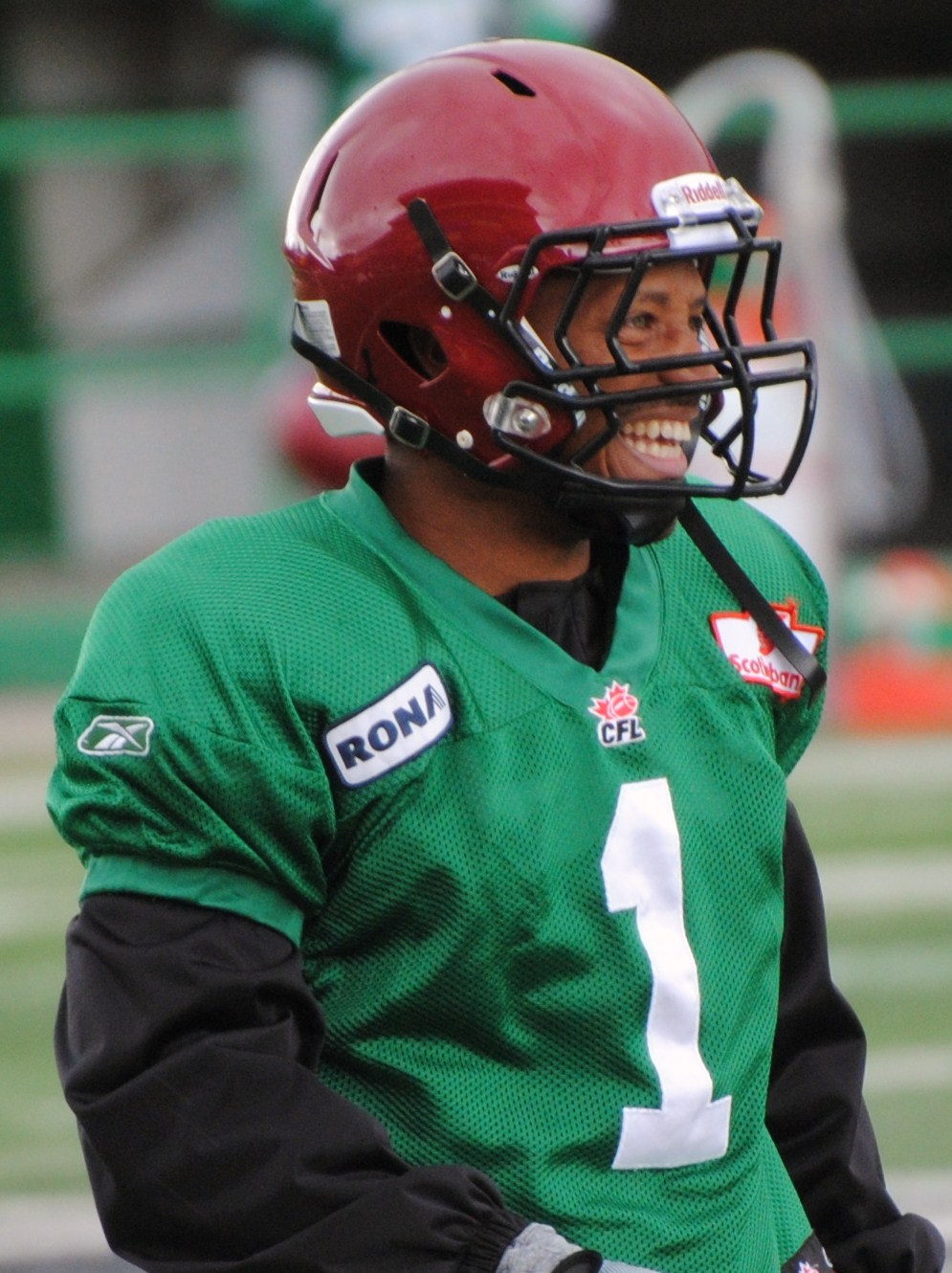
- Morgan with the Saskatchewan Roughriders in 2010

No. 1
- Position: Defensive back

Personal information
- Born: December 4, 1976 (age 49); Hollywood, California, U.S.
- Listed height: 5 ft 9 in (1.75 m)
- Listed weight: 186 lb (84 kg)

Career information
- College: Brigham Young

Career history
- 2000–2006: Saskatchewan Roughriders
- 2007: Edmonton Eskimos
- 2008–2010: Saskatchewan Roughriders

Awards and highlights
- 3× CFL All-Star (2002, 2003, 2005); 4× CFL West All-Star (2001, 2002, 2003, 2005)
- Stats at CFL.ca (archive)

Omarr Morgan (born December 4, 1976) is a former Canadian Football League (CFL) cornerback.

In college, Morgan played for Brigham Young University. He was signed as a free agent by Saskatchewan in 1999, but didn't make the team until 2000 when the Roy Shivers regime took over the Roughriders franchise. Since that time, he had been a mainstay in the Riders' defensive secondary playing the weak-side corner position. He was named to the CFL All-Star team in 2002, 2003, and 2005. He attended the St. Louis Rams' (National Football League) training camp in 1998. He was the only player in the 1998 Senior Bowl not drafted into the NFL.

In February 2007, he was signed by the Eskimos. He was signed by Saskatchewan again in 2008 as a free agent.

On February 28, 2011, Morgan was released by the Saskatchewan Roughriders.
