= Tom Pate =

American football player (1952–1975)

Profile
- Position: Linebacker

Personal information
- Born: July 21, 1952; Omaha, Nebraska, U.S.
- Died: October 21, 1975 (aged 23); Calgary, Alberta, Canada

Career information
- College: University of Nebraska–Lincoln

Career history
- 1975: Hamilton Tiger Cats

Awards and highlights
- National champion (1971)

Tom Pate (July 21, 1952 – October 21, 1975) was a Canadian Football League (CFL) linebacker who died from a critical injury sustained while playing a league game in 1975.

A graduate of the University of Nebraska–Lincoln (where he majored in business administration), Pate was a 3 time letterman with the Cornhuskers and a member their 1971 national championship team. He joined the Hamilton Tiger-Cats in 1975 and as a rookie played 12 regular season games and recovered 1 fumble.

On October 18, 1975, playing against the Stampeders in Calgary, he suffered an aneurysm late in the fourth quarter during a running play deep in Hamilton territory. Pate was critically injured on the play after striking his head on the McMahon Stadium turf while being blocked by Stampeders fullback Rick Galbos. Aged 23 at the time, he never regained consciousness and died three days later.

In 1976 the Canadian Football League Players' Association named its sportsmanship and community service award after him: the Tom Pate Memorial Award.

== See also ==
- List of gridiron football players who died during their careers
