= Bruce Beaton =

Canadian football player (born 1968)

No. 62
- Positions: Offensive tackle, Guard

Personal information
- Born: June 13, 1968 (age 58); Port Hood, Nova Scotia, Canada
- Listed height: 6 ft 5 in (1.96 m)
- Listed weight: 285 lb (129 kg)

Career information
- University: Acadia
- CFL draft: 1991: 1st round, 8th overall pick

Career history
- 1991–1992: BC Lions
- 1993–1994: Ottawa Rough Riders
- 1995: Calgary Stampeders
- 1996–1997: Montreal Alouettes
- 1998–2003: Edmonton Eskimos
- 2001: Los Angeles Xtreme
- 2005: Edmonton Eskimos

Awards and highlights
- 2× Grey Cup champion (2003, 2005); DeMarco-Becket Memorial Trophy (2002); 3× CFL All-Star (2000, 2001, 2003); CFL East All-Star (1996); 5× CFL West All-Star (1998, 2000, 2001, 2002, 2003)

Career CFL statistics
- Fumble recoveries: 1
- Tackles: 6

Bruce Beaton (born June 13, 1968) is a Canadian former professional football offensive lineman who played 13 seasons in the Canadian Football League for five different teams. He was named CFL All-Star three times and was a part of two Grey Cup championship teams with the Edmonton Eskimos. Beaton played college football at Acadia University. He retired from sports in 2004.
