= Bruce Walker (Canadian football) =

Profile
- Position: Wide receiver

Personal information
- Born: April 16, 1955 (age 71)

Career information
- College: University of Windsor

Career history
- 1979–84: Ottawa Rough Riders

Awards and highlights
- Tom Pate Memorial Award (1984)

Bruce Walker was a wide receiver in the Canadian Football League playing six seasons with the Ottawa Rough Riders.

A graduate of University of Windsor, Walker joined the Riders in 1979. He played in the famous Grey Cup classic in 1981. His career totals were 149 passes caught for 1828 yards. In 1984, his last season, he won the prestigious Tom Pate Memorial Award.
