= Arland Bruce III =

American gridiron football player (born 1977)

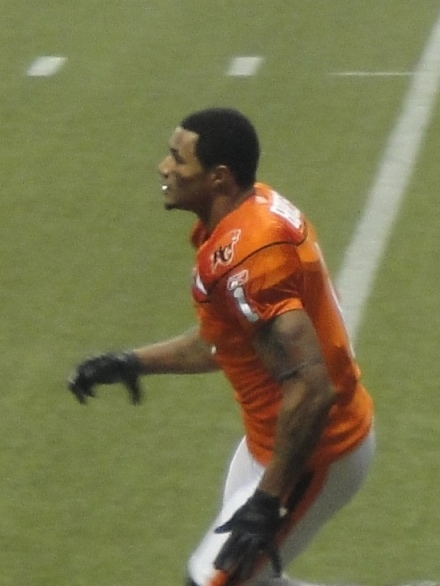
- Bruce at the 99th Grey Cup

No. 1, 19, 5, 4
- Positions: Wide receiver, slotback

Personal information
- Born: November 23, 1977 (age 48); Olathe, Kansas, U.S.
- Listed height: 5 ft 10 in (1.78 m)
- Listed weight: 191 lb (87 kg)

Career information
- High school: Olathe North
- College: Minnesota
- NFL draft: 2000: undrafted

Career history
- 2000: Kansas City Chiefs*
- 2001–2002: Winnipeg Blue Bombers
- 2003: San Francisco 49ers
- 2004–2009: Toronto Argonauts
- 2009–2011: Hamilton Tiger-Cats
- 2011–2012: BC Lions
- 2013: Montreal Alouettes
- * Offseason or practice squad member only

Awards and highlights
- 2× Grey Cup champion (2004, 2011); 3× CFL All-Star (2006, 2009, 2010); 5× CFL East AllStar (2005, 2006, 2008–2010); CFL record: Most receptions in a single game (16)
- Stats at Pro Football Reference
- Stats at CFL.ca (archive)

Arland Richard Bruce III (born November 23, 1977) is an American former professional football wide receiver who played in the Canadian Football League (CFL) and National Football League (NFL). He is a two-time Grey Cup champion, having won in 2004 with the Toronto Argonauts and in 2011 with the BC Lions. He played 12 seasons in the CFL with the Winnipeg Blue Bombers, Toronto Argonauts, Hamilton Tiger-Cats, BC Lions, and Montreal Alouettes. During the 2011 season, he became the 14th CFL receiver to record over 10,000 yards receiving in a career. Bruce also played in the NFL for the San Francisco 49ers.

== Early life ==
Bruce attended Olathe North High School in Olathe, Kansas, and was a letterman in football. As a senior, he was a BlueChip Illustrated Top-100 pick, the Kansas State Player of the Year, and finished the year with 1,696 rushing yards. Bruce finished his high school career with more than 3,000 rushing yards and 50 touchdowns.

== College career ==
Bruce then attended Hutchinson Community College in Hutchinson, Kansas. As a freshman, he was named a First-team All-American selection and rushed for over 1,000 yards. During his sophomore season, he ran for 997 yards and 10 touchdowns and was named a Second-team All-American selection.

Bruce transferred to play for the University of Minnesota. As a senior, he helped lead his team to an 8–3 record and a Sun Bowl berth.

== Professional career ==
=== Kansas City Chiefs ===
On April 19, 2000, Bruce was signed by the Kansas City Chiefs of the NFL. He was waived on August 27 and later signed to the team's practice squad on September 19, 2000.

=== Winnipeg Blue Bombers ===
On May 1, 2001, Bruce joined the CFL's Winnipeg Blue Bombers where he got his first opportunity as a professional to receive significant playing time, playing in all 18 regular season games. In his rookie season, Bruce had 818 receiving yards with 7 touchdowns. His team went on to play in the Grey Cup championship, only to lose to the Calgary Stampeders.

In 2002, Bruce surpassed the 1000 yard receiving mark by amassing 1062 receiving yards with 12 touchdowns in 17 games.

=== San Francisco 49ers ===
In 2003, Bruce returned to the U.S. to try his luck once more with the NFL. On March 3 of that year, he signed with the San Francisco 49ers where he spent much of his playing time on special teams. He was waived on August 30, 2004.

=== Toronto Argonauts ===
In 2004, after being released by the 49ers following their training camp, Bruce returned to the CFL with the Toronto Argonauts, signing with them on September 3, more than halfway through the CFL season and just shortly before their Labour Day Classic game against the Hamilton Tiger-Cats in which he played. For the remaining seven games in the regular season, Bruce had 247 receiving yards with just one touchdown. In addition to playing receiver, Bruce also served as one of two kick returners on the team alongside incumbent Bashir Levingston. In that role, Bruce returned two kick returns for touchdowns that season. In the East Division final, Bruce led all receivers with 12 receptions for 101 yards, and returned a kickoff 97 yards for a touchdown in the first quarter, helping the Argonauts advance to the Grey Cup championship that year. In the big game, the kick returning threat of both Bruce & Levingston induced the opposing BC Lions to punt the ball out of bounds for much of the game to neutralize the threat. In addition, Bruce was once again a go to receiver amassing 79 yards on 5 receptions. Bruce and the Argos went on to win the Grey Cup.

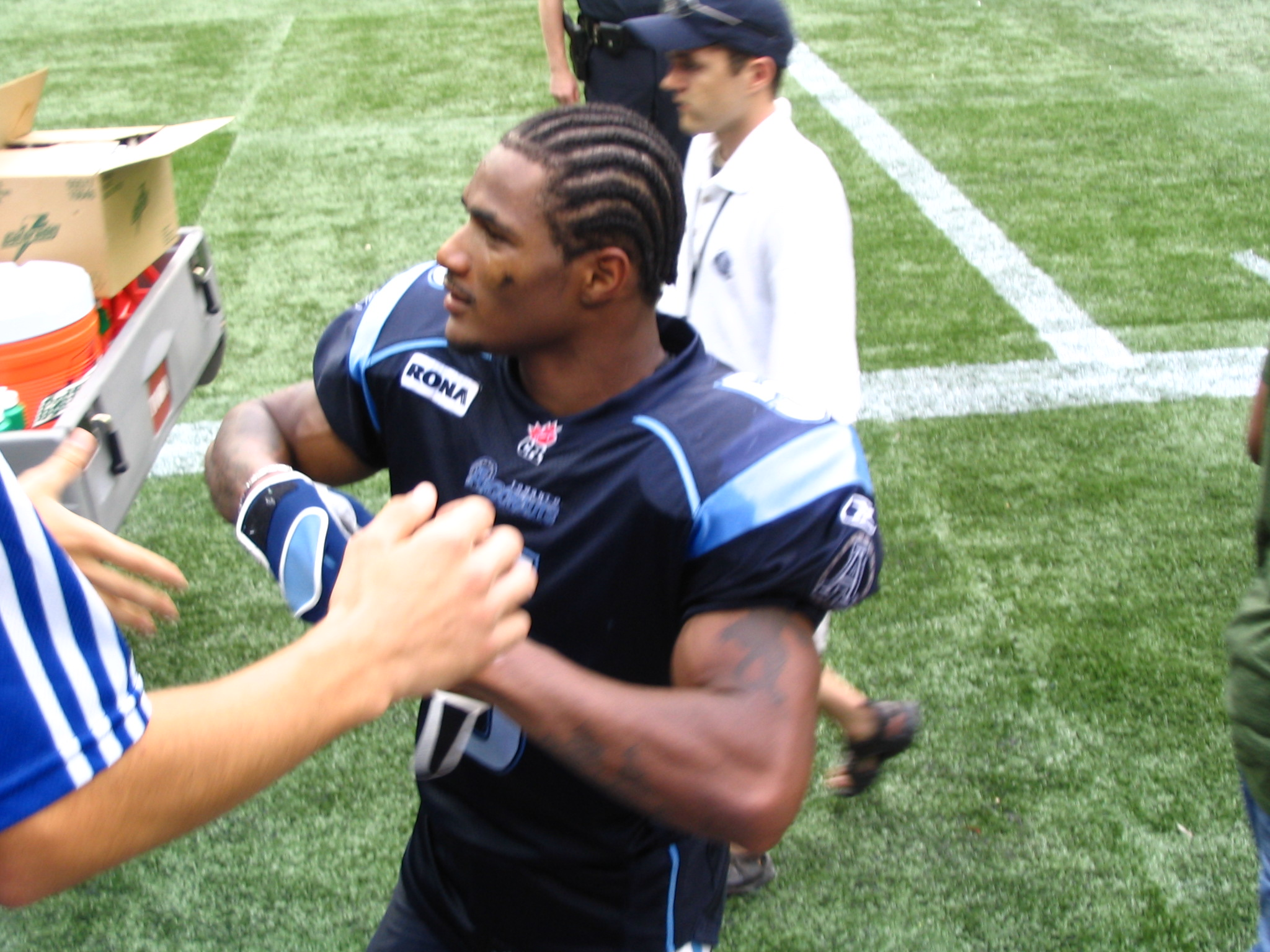
Bruce in 2005 at Rogers Centre in Toronto, Ontario.

In 2005, Bruce established himself as the Argonauts top receiver with 1205 receiving yards and 11 touchdowns. In that same year, Bruce was named an East division all-star marking the first time in his CFL career he had ever been named to an all-star team.

In 2008, after acquiring a touchdown against the Hamilton Tiger-Cats, Bruce was fined an undisclosed amount by the CFL for donning a Spider-Man mask during his touchdown celebration.

In 2009, he received two objectionable conduct penalties and an undisclosed fine from the CFL for a touchdown celebration against the Tiger-Cats on July 1, in which he removed his helmet, jersey, and shoulder pads, and laid down in the end zone in what he said was a tribute to the recently deceased pop star, Michael Jackson. The Argonauts publicly supported the fine and disciplined Bruce additionally and he apologized to teammates at a team meeting the following day. Head coach Bart Andrus took some responsibility on himself, however, noting that, "I made the mistake of telling him in camp that once he got to the end zone I didn't care what he did but he's straight with it now and I think next time around he will celebrate in an appropriate manner."

=== Hamilton Tiger-Cats ===
On July 29, 2009, Bruce was traded to the Hamilton Tiger-Cats in exchange for the rights to Corey Mace, a third round pick in the 2010 CFL draft, and a conditional third round pick in the 2011 CFL draft a week after a dispute with coach Andrus became public and Bruce was left home for the Week 4 game in Winnipeg.

In July 2011, Bruce declared his intention to change his name to "Runako Reth".

=== BC Lions ===
On August 3, 2011, Bruce was traded to the BC Lions in exchange for a third-round draft pick in the 2012 CFL draft and an additional conditional draft pick in the 2013 CFL Draft. Bruce had a productive season with the Lions, recording 49 catches for 755 yards and eight touchdowns in 12 games. In the 99th Grey Cup game against the Winnipeg Blue Bombers, he had 73 yards receiving and a touchdown and won his second championship. During the following off-season, he signed a contract extension with the Lions. On January 18, 2013, Bruce was released by the BC Lions.

=== Montreal Alouettes ===
On January 21, 2013, Bruce signed with the Montreal Alouettes of the Canadian Football League. Arland Bruce had a respectable 2013 season with the Alouettes. He contributed 64 pass receptions, his most since 2010, for 851 yards with 5 touchdowns. In February 2014, Bruce was fined an undisclosed amount by the CFL following his Instagram post in which he told openly gay NFL prospect Michael Sam to, "get on his knees and submit to God fully". Bruce was released by the Alouettes in late February. Bruce's high salary along with the belief that new head coach Tom Higgins would start two Canadian wide receivers were cited as the reasons for his dismissal.

== CFL statistics ==
Receiving		Regular season						Playoffs
Year	Team	Games	No.	Yards	Avg	Long	TD	Games	No.	Yards	Avg	Long	TD
2001	WPG	18	48	818	17.0	62	7	2	7	122	17.4	38	1
2002	WPG	18	67	1,062	15.9	55	12	2	3	79	26.3	33	0
2004	TOR	7	16	247	15.4	34	1	3	22	228	10.4	25	2
2005	TOR	16	67	1,205	18.0	89	11	1	2	17	8.5	7	0
2006	TOR	18	77	1,370	17.8	94	11	2	10	186	18.6	77	2
2007	TOR	14	61	839	13.8	49	7	1	4	131	32.8	90	0
2008	TOR	18	92	1,210	13.2	51	9	Team did not qualify
2009	TOR	3	14	199	14.2	38	1
2009	HAM	14	74	1,043	14.1	49	9	1	6	80	13.3	36	0
2010	HAM	16	86	1,303	15.2	58	8	1	7	76	10.9	22	0
2011	HAM	4	9	104	11.6	33	0
2011	BC	12	49	755	15.4	100	8	2	9	155	17.2	43	1
2012	BC	18	43	603	14.0	55	5	1	6	56	9.3	19	0
2013	MTL	17	64	851	13.3	86	5	1	2	26	13	15	0
CFL totals		193	767	11,609	15.1	100	94	17	78	1,156	14.8	90	6

== Personal life ==
His parents are Yolanda Bruce and Arland Richard Bruce Jr. Bruce was married to Linda Bruce, their children include three sons named Arland Bruce IV, Aiden Bruce, and Akobi Bruce. He has two sisters Denise (Kansas) and Kama (California) and one brother Bryson (North Carolina). Bruce is the cousin of former NFL wide receiver Isaac Bruce.
