= Uzooma Okeke =

American gridiron football player (born 1970)

Profile
- Position: Offensive tackle

Personal information
- Born: September 3, 1970 (age 56); Beaumont, Texas, U.S.

Career information
- College: SMU

Career history
- 1994–1995: Shreveport Pirates
- 1996: Ottawa Rough Riders
- 1997–2006: Montreal Alouettes

Awards and highlights
- Grey Cup champion (2002); 7× CFL All-Star (1997–1999, 2002–2005); 7× CFL East All-Star (1997–1999, 2002–2005)
- Stats at CFL.ca (archive)
- Canadian Football Hall of Fame (Class of 2014)

Uzooma Okeke (born September 3, 1970) is an American former professional football offensive tackle who played in the Canadian Football League (CFL). He won a Grey Cup with the Montreal Alouettes in 2002. Okeke is currently the Football Operations Assistant/Scout for the Alouettes. He was inducted into the Canadian Football Hall of Fame in 2014.

== College career ==
Uzooma Okeke was a two-year starter at offensive tackle at Southern Methodist University (SMU), playing both offense and defense. He was on the team that brought football back to SMU following their penalty. Under the tutelage of Forrest Gregg, he blossomed both on the football field and in persevering to obtain his college degree. He graduated from SMU with a degree in Public Relations.

== CFL career ==
Forrest Gregg recruited him to play for the Shreveport Pirates in 1994 and 1995, and that began his CFL career. He moved to the Ottawa Rough Riders in 1996, but in 1997 started his very successful (10 year) career with the Montreal Alouettes. He was a durable mainstay of their offensive line, being named an All-Star six times, and in 1998 won the Leo Dandurand Trophy as best lineman in the East, and in 1999 won the CFL's Most Outstanding Offensive Lineman Award. He retired as a player prior to the 2007 season and joined the Alouettes as a scout.

He was inducted into the Canadian Football Hall of Fame in 2014.
