= Aldi Henry =

Canadian gridiron football player (born 1972)

No. 9
- Position: Defensive back

Personal information
- Born: July 17, 1972 (age 54); Montreal, Quebec, Canada

Career information
- College: Michigan State University
- CFL draft: 1997: 3rd round, 18th overall pick

Career history
- 1997–2002: Calgary Stampeders

Awards and highlights
- 2× Grey Cup champion (1998, 2001); Dick Suderman Trophy (2001)

Aldi Henry (born July 17, 1972) is a Canadian former professional football player who played defensive back for the Calgary Stampeders of the Canadian Football League (CFL) from 1997 to 2002. He was part of the Stampeders 1998 and 2001 Grey Cup winning teams. He won the Dick Suderman Trophy as the 89th Grey Cup's Most Valuable Canadian. He played college football at Michigan State University.
