= Eric Carter (Canadian football) =

American gridiron football player (born 1969)

Profile
- Position: Defensive back

Personal information
- Born: January 23, 1969 (age 57); Jesup, Georgia, U.S.

Career information
- College: Knoxville

Career history
- 1994–1998: Hamilton Tiger-Cats
- 1999–2003: BC Lions
- 2004: Winnipeg Blue Bombers

Awards and highlights
- Grey Cup champion (2000); 4× CFL All-Star (1995, 1998, 2001, 2002); CFL East All-Star (1998); 5× CFL West All-Star (1999, 2000, 2001, 2002, 2003)

Eric Carter (born January 23, 1969) was a football player in the Canadian Football League for eleven seasons. Carter played as a cornerback for the Hamilton Tiger-Cats from 1994 to 1998, the BC Lions from 1999 to 2003 and the Winnipeg Blue Bombers in 2004. He was a CFL All-Star four times and won a Grey Cup for the Lions in 2000. He played college football at Knoxville College.

Carter was selected to the Lions' 2004 50th Anniversary Dream Team.
