= Barrin Simpson =

American gridiron football player (born 1977)

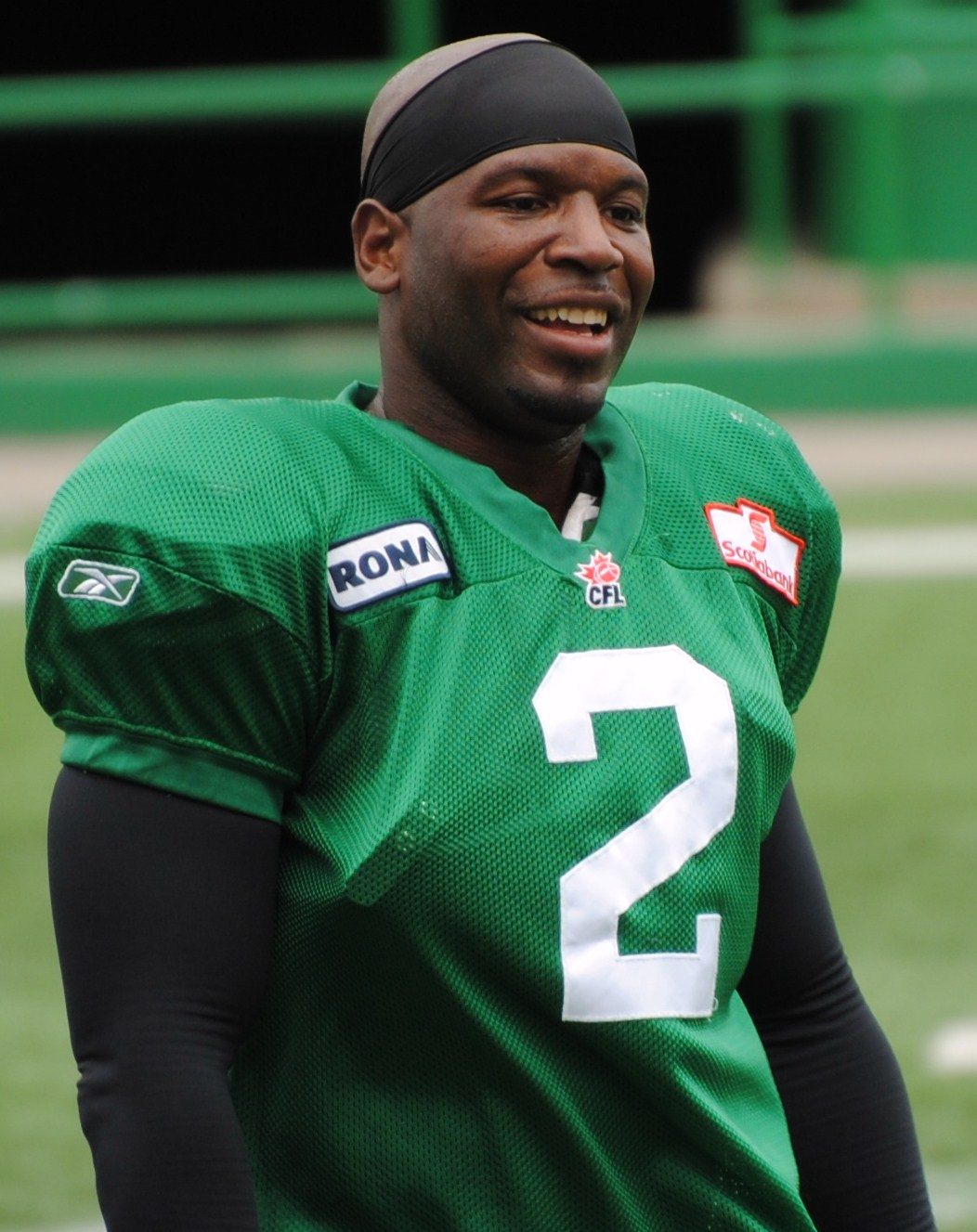
- Simpson with the Saskatchewan Roughriders in 2010

No. 2
- Position: Linebacker

Personal information
- Born: October 1, 1977 (age 49)
- Listed height: 6 ft 0 in (1.83 m)
- Listed weight: 230 lb (104 kg)

Career information
- College: Mississippi State

Career history
- 2001: San Francisco Demons
- 2001–2005: BC Lions
- 2006–2009: Winnipeg Blue Bombers
- 2010–2011: Saskatchewan Roughriders

Awards and highlights
- 6× CFL All-Star (2001, 2002, 2003, 2004, 2006, 2007); 2× CFL East All-Star (2006, 2007); 5× CFL West All-Star (2001, 2002, 2003, 2004, 2010); James P. McCaffrey Trophy (2006); CFL's Most Outstanding Rookie Award (2001); Norm Fieldgate Trophy (2001); Jackie Parker Trophy (2001); First-team All-American (1999); First-team All-SEC (1999)
- Stats at CFL.ca

Barrin Simpson (born October 1, 1977) is an American former professional football linebacker who played 11 seasons in the Canadian Football League (CFL).

== Early life and college ==
He attended Starkville High School in Mississippi, where he played middle linebacker and was part of the Yellow Jackets teams that went 30–0 and won 2 State Championships (1994 & 1995). Simpson a two-time All-SEC performer in 1998 and 1999 at Mississippi State University Simpson played in 40 games in college from 1996 to 1999, starting in 27 of them. He had 104 tackles, and 2 sacks in his sophomore year. Simpson earned 82 tackles impressively while missing 3 games due to a knee injury in his junior year. Simpson capped off his senior season with 105 tackles, Sporting News 1st Team All-American, and Dick Butkus semi-finalist honoring the best linebacker in college football in 1999. Barrin's senior season was highlighted by his 23 tackles 1 forced fumble and 1 fumble recovery game verses rival Ole Miss which earned him SEC defensive player of the week.

== Professional career ==
He was released on December 6, 2011.

2010: Saskatchewan Roughriders

Started all 18 regular season games, West Final and Grey Cup game at middle linebacker. They missed the West Semi-final due to an ankle injury. They had ten defensive tackles and a fumble recovery in week nine. They had 11 defensive tackles in week ten. They finished the regular season with a league leading 105 defensive tackles. They also added four quarterback sacks, three tackles for a loss, two special team tackles, one pass knockdown, one fumble recovery and one forced fumble. They had six defensive tackles in the Grey Cup game. They were named a West Division All-star.

2009: Winnipeg Blue Bombers

Played 13 games for the Blue Bombers and tallied 84 defensive tackles, three special team tackles, two quarterback sacks and one interception

2008: Winnipeg Blue Bombers

Simpson started the year off leading the league in tackles with 29 after 4 games before suffering a season-ending injury tearing his Pectorial Major Tendon. Barrin miss the last 14 games and the playoffs.

2007: Winnipeg Blue Bombers

Simpson had over 100 tackles for the second straight season with the Blue Bombers. He was second in the CFL in defensive tackles with 112, was tied for third in fumble returns with two and contributed four sacks. He was named a CFL All-Star.

2006: Winnipeg Blue Bombers

It didn't take long for Simpson to influence his new team. The first-year Blue Bomber middle linebacker led the CFL in defensive tackles with 110. It was the fourth time Simpson led the CFL in defensive tackles in a season. Appearing in 18 regular season games, Simpson was also among the Bomber regular season leaders in quarterback sacks (three), special teams tackles (eight) and tackles for losses (four). He also contributed two pass knockdowns, an interception, two forced fumbles and two fumble recoveries. Simpson also started the team's CFL East Semifinal loss to the Toronto Argonauts, contributing a team-leading 10 defensive tackles. He was the winner or co-winner of the CJOB Defensive Player of the Game Award five times and was the CFL Defensive Player of the Week during Week Three versus Edmonton (eight defensive tackles and one special teams tackle) and Week 11 versus the B.C. Lions (11 tackles, one quarterback sack and an interception). Simpson's efforts were recognized by his being named to the CFL and East Division All-Star teams. It was the fifth time he was named a division and league all-star during his CFL career. Simpson was also runner-up as the league's Outstanding Defensive Player of the Year Award. He finished second to former B.C. teammate Brent Johnson.

2005: B.C. Lions

Simpson proved his durability by starting all 18 of the B.C. Lions regular season games and one playoff game. It marked the fifth year in a row he hasn't missed a game. Simpson was once again a tackling machine for the Lions. He led the team in defensive tackles for the fifth straight year with 71. He finished tied for eighth place overall in the CFL in that category. The Leos' defensive leader also led the team in hits with 83. His six quarterback sacks ranked second among B.C. defenders. Simpson also collected three tackles for losses for 12 yards, one fumble recovery and one interception return for 17 yards. He collected another four defensive tackles in the Leos' lone playoff encounter.

2004: B.C. Lions

Simpson had one of his finest seasons as a pro and it did not go unnoticed. He was a CFL All-Star, a West Division All-Star and was the B.C. Lions' Defensive Player of the Year nominee. In 18 regular season games he registered 78 defensive tackles, 13 special teams tackles, seven tackles for losses for 15 yards, two interceptions for nine yards and three fumble recoveries for four yards. He also had six defensive tackles and two tackles for losses for four yards in the Lions' Western Conference playoff game. He also had four defensive tackles in the Lions' Grey Cup loss to the Toronto Argonauts.

2003: B.C. Lions

Simpson led the CFL in defensive tackles (92), the third straight year he did that as a member of the B.C. Lions. He also had seven special teams tackles, four tackles for losses for 16 yards, four quarterback sacks, one interception and three fumble recoveries. Those numbers earned him CFL and West Division All-Star honours. He collected another five defensive tackles in the Lions' lone playoff contest.

2002: B.C. Lions

The second-year B.C. Lions linebacker, led the CFL in defensive tackles for the second year in a row with 92. He also had four tackles for losses for 10 yards, six quarterback sacks, two interceptions for four yards and one fumble recovery. He was once again honoured as a CFL All-Star and a West Division All-Star. In one playoff contest, he had one defensive tackle.

2001: B.C. Lions

Simpson had an impressive rookie season with the B.C. Lions. The first-year defender led the entire CFL in defensive tackles with 115. He also collected on special teams tackle, one tackle for a loss, two quarterback sacks, one interception and three fumble returns. That in turn led to Simpson being named the CFL Rookie of the Year, a CFL All-Star and a West Division All-Star. He made one playoff start, netting four defensive tackles, one special teams tackle and one fumble return

== Coaching career ==
He has served as a coach at Brewer High School in Fort Worth, Texas.
