= Tom Pate Memorial Award =

Canadian football award

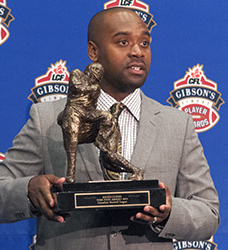
- Kevin Glenn holding the Tom Pate Memorial Award
- League: Canadian Football League
- Awarded for: Demonstrating qualities of sportsmanship and dedication to the CFL and the community
- Country: Canada

History
- First award: 1976; 50 years ago
- Editions: 49
- First winner: George Reed
- Most wins: Mark McLoughlin; Mike "Pinball" Clemons (2 wins)
- Most recent: Andrew Peirson
- Website: cfl.ca

Tom Pate Memorial Award, selected annually by the Canadian Football League Players' Association, is awarded to a player with outstanding sportsmanship and someone who has made a significant contribution to his team, his community and Association. The award winner must display these qualities such that it distinguishes him from his peers.

The award is named in the memory of deceased CFL player Tom Pate. A 23-year-old rookie with the Hamilton Tiger-Cats, on October 11, 1975, he was critically injured in a game against the Calgary Stampeders. He never regained consciousness and died three days later.

The award is also known as the CFLPA's Tom Pate Outstanding Community Service Award.

== Tom Pate Memorial Award winners ==
Year	Player	Position	Club	Ref.
2026	Isaac Adeyemi-Berglund	(DE)	Montreal Alouettes	
2025	Andrew Peirson	(OL)	BC Lions	
2024	Adam Bighill	(LB)	Winnipeg Blue Bombers	
2023	Brett Lauther	(K)	Saskatchewan Roughriders	
2022	Emmanuel Arceneaux	(WR)	Edmonton Elks	
2021	Mike Daly	(DB)	Hamilton Tiger-Cats	
2020	N/A	N/A	N/A	
2019	Rob Maver	(P)	Calgary Stampeders	
2018	Ryan King	(LS)	Edmonton Eskimos	
2017	Adarius Bowman	(WR)	Edmonton Eskimos	
2016	Marco Iannuzzi	(WR)	BC Lions	
2015	Henry Burris	(QB)	Ottawa RedBlacks	
2014	Randy Chevrier	(DT)	Calgary Stampeders	
2013	Kyries Hebert	(LB)	Montreal Alouettes	
2012	Brian Bratton	(WR)	Montreal Alouettes	
2011	Kevin Glenn	(QB)	Hamilton Tiger-Cats	
2010	Wes Lysack	(DB)	Calgary Stampeders	
2009	Marwan Hage	(C)	Hamilton Tiger-Cats	
2008	Jeremy O'Day	(C)	Saskatchewan Roughriders	
2007	Milt Stegall	(SB)	Winnipeg Blue Bombers	
2006	Mark Washington	(DB)	BC Lions	
2005	Danny McManus	(QB)	Hamilton Tiger-Cats	
2004	Barron Miles	(DB)	Montreal Alouettes	
2003	Steve Hardin	(OT)	BC Lions	
2002	Greg Frers	(DS)	Calgary Stampeders	
2001	Rick Walters	(SB)	Edmonton Eskimos	
2000	Mike Morreale	(WR)	Hamilton Tiger-Cats	
1999	Jamie Taras	(C)	BC Lions	
1998	Glen Scrivener	(DT)	Winnipeg Blue Bombers	
1997	Mark McLoughlin	(K)	Calgary Stampeders	
1996	Mike "Pinball" Clemons	(RB)	Toronto Argonauts	
1995	Mark McLoughlin	(K)	Calgary Stampeders	
1994	O. J. Brigance	(LB)	Baltimore CFLers	
1993	Mike "Pinball" Clemons	(RB)	Toronto Argonauts	
1992	Danny Barrett	(QB)	BC Lions	
1991	Stu Laird	(LB)	Calgary Stampeders	
1990	Richie Hall	(DB)	Saskatchewan Roughriders	
1989	Matt Dunigan	(QB)	BC Lions	
1988	Hector Pothier	(OT)	Edmonton Eskimos	
1987	Nick Arakgi	(DE)	Winnipeg Blue Bombers	
1986	Tyrone Crews	(LB)	BC Lions	
1985	Jerry Friesen	(LB)	Saskatchewan Roughriders	
1984	Bruce Walker	(WR)	Ottawa Rough Riders	
1983	Henry Waszczuk	(C)	Hamilton Tiger-Cats	
1982	David Boone	(DE)	Edmonton Eskimos	
1981	Ken McEachern	(DB)	Saskatchewan Roughriders	
1980	Jim Coode	(OT)	Ottawa Rough Riders	
1979	John Helton	(DT)	Winnipeg Blue Bombers	
1978	Pete Mueller	(TE)	Toronto Argonauts	
1977	Ron Lancaster	(QB)	Saskatchewan Roughriders	
1976	George Reed	(RB)	Saskatchewan Roughriders	
