= Brett MacNeil =

Canadian gridiron football player (born 1967)

Profile
- Position: Guard

Personal information
- Born: November 27, 1967 (age 58); Nepean, Ontario, Canada
- Listed height: 6 ft 4 in (1.93 m)
- Listed weight: 290 lb (132 kg)

Career information
- College: Boston University Terriers
- CFL draft: 1991: 1st round, 7th overall pick

Career history
- 1991: Ottawa Rough Riders
- 1992–1997: Winnipeg Blue Bombers
- 1998: Edmonton Eskimos
- 1999–2002: Winnipeg Blue Bombers

Awards and highlights
- CFL All-Star (2001); CFL East AllS-tar (2001); 2× CBC Walby's Warriors All-Star (2000, 2001); Ed Kotowich Award (2001); Winnipeg Football Club Hall of Fame (2006)

Brett MacNeil (born November 27, 1967) is a Canadian former professional football offensive lineman who played twelve seasons in the Canadian Football League (CFL).
