= Terry Ray (gridiron football) =

Belgian-American gridiron football player (born 1969)

No. 30, 23, 24, 28, 25
- Positions: Linebacker, Safety

Personal information
- Born: October 12, 1969 (age 57); Brussels, Belgium
- Listed height: 6 ft 1 in (1.85 m)
- Listed weight: 205 lb (93 kg)

Career information
- College: Oklahoma
- NFL draft: 1992: 6th round, 158th overall pick

Career history
- 1992: Atlanta Falcons
- 1993–1996: New England Patriots
- 1997: Atlanta Falcons*
- 1998: Denver Broncos*
- 1999–2003: Edmonton Eskimos
- 2004: Winnipeg Blue Bombers
- * Offseason or practice squad member only

Awards and highlights
- Grey Cup champion (2003); Norm Fieldgate Trophy (2000); Dr. Beattie Martin Trophy (2000); 2× CFL All-Star (2000, 2001); 3× CFL West All-Star (1999, 2000, 2001)
- Stats at Pro Football Reference

Terry Ray (born October 12, 1969) is a Belgian-American former gridiron football safety and linebacker who played in both the National Football League (NFL) and Canadian Football League (CFL) between 1992 and 2004.

== NFL career ==
Ray was selected out of the University of Oklahoma in the sixth round, 158th overall, by the Atlanta Falcons of the NFL in the 1992 NFL draft. After playing in 10 games with Atlanta, Ray joined the New England Patriots and under new head coach Bill Parcells for the 1993 NFL season. Ray played with the Patriots until the 1996 NFL season, a season in which the Patriots lost to the Green Bay Packers in Super Bowl XXXI.

== CFL career ==
Ray left the NFL after the 1996 season. Following two years out of football, Ray moved to the Canadian Football League (CFL), where he signed with the Edmonton Eskimos on May 12, 1999. In Canada, Ray became a four-time all star. Ray was released by the Eskimos prior to the 2003 CFL season in favor of Singor Mobley. Expected to sign with another CFL team, Ray signed with the Winnipeg Blue Bombers for the 2004 CFL season. After the 2004 season, Ray retired.

== Scouting career ==
From 2005 to 2008, Ray was a scout with the Washington Commanders in the NFL.
