= Bryan Chiu =

Canadian gridiron football player and coach (born 1974)

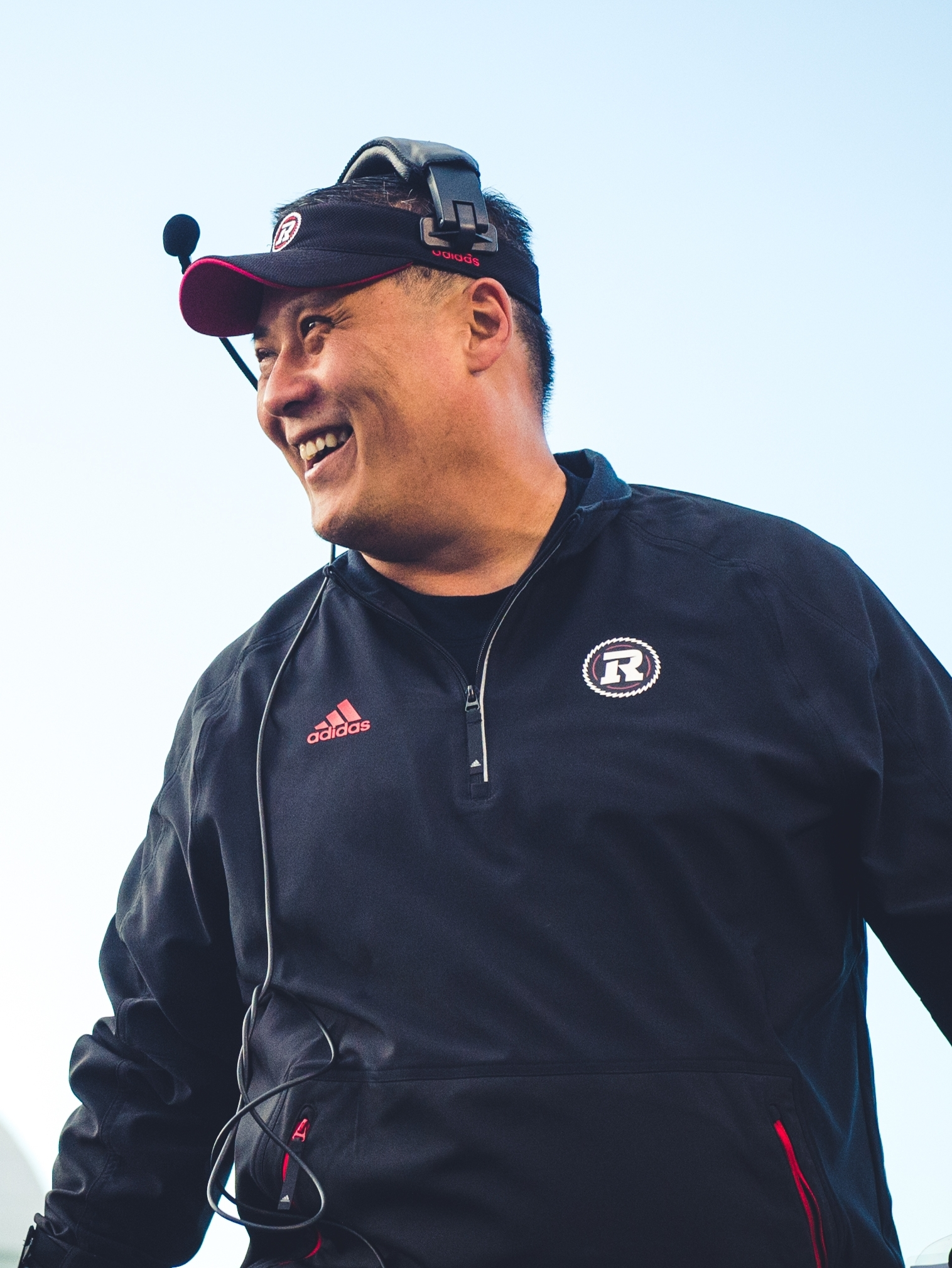
- Chiu in 2016

Profile
- Position: Centre

Personal information
- Born: August 16, 1974 (age 52); Vancouver, British Columbia, Canada
- Listed height: 6 ft 2 in (1.88 m)
- Listed weight: 290 lb (132 kg)

Career information
- College: Washington State
- CFL draft: 1996: 2nd round, 18th overall pick

Career history

Playing
- 1997–2009: Montreal Alouettes

Coaching
- 2010–2013: Concordia Stingers (OLC)
- 2014: Toronto Argonauts (OLC)
- 2015–2017: Ottawa Redblacks (OLC)
- 2019: BC Lions (OLC)

Awards and highlights
- 3× Grey Cup champion (2002, 2009, 2016); Most Outstanding Offensive Lineman (2002); 7× CFL All-Star (2000–2005, 2008); 9× CFL East All-Star (2000–2006, 2008, 2009)

Career statistics
- Games played: 218
- Stats at CFL.ca (archive)
- Canadian Football Hall of Fame (Class of 2025)

Bryan Chiu (born August 16, 1974) is the head coach of the Vancouver College football team, the Fighting Irish. He is a former professional Canadian football centre for the Montreal Alouettes of the Canadian Football League (CFL) from 1997 to 2009 and was an offensive line coach for the Toronto Argonauts, Ottawa Redblacks, and BC Lions. He is a three-time Grey Cup champion after winning as a player with the Alouettes in 2002 and 2009 and as a coach with the Redblacks in 2016. He is a member of the Canadian Football Hall of Fame and the BC Football Hall of Fame.

== High school ==
Chiu played football in high school for the Vancouver College Fighting Irish in Vancouver, British Columbia.

== College years ==
Chiu started his college football career playing ball for the Pacific Tigers and transferred to Washington State when Pacific dropped its football program. He started all 11 games he played with the Washington State Cougars in 1996 and graduated in 1997 with a degree in Sports Management.

== Professional career ==
Since joining the Montreal Alouettes in 1997 Chiu proved himself to be one of the top centres in the CFL. He was honoured as both a CFL and East Division All-Star from 2000 consecutively through to 2006 and won the Most Outstanding Lineman in 2002. Chiu was the Alouettes' Most Outstanding Linesman in both 2001 and 2002 and helped his team win the 90th Grey Cup. In 2006, he was named to the honour roll of the TSN Top 50 CFL Players. On June 6, 2010 on CFL Training Camp opening, Chiu announced his retirement after 13 seasons with the Montreal Alouettes, through his Twitter account.

Chiu was inducted into the BC Football Hall of Fame in 2023. He was announced as a member of the Canadian Football Hall of Fame 2025 class on June 12, 2025.

== Coaching years ==
On June 22, 2010, he joined the Concordia Stinger coaching staff as the assistant offensive coordinator and offensive line coach.

On May 9, 2014, Chiu joined the Toronto Argonauts coaching staff as their offensive line coach.

On December 23, 2014, he was named the offensive line coach of the Ottawa Redblacks.

Chiu joined the BC Lions for the 2019 season under new head coach DeVone Claybrooks. However, Chiu was released from his duties midway through the season as the team fell to 1-9 and had given up a league worst 43 sacks.

On February 8, 2022, Chiu was named the head football coach of his alma mater, the Vancouver College Fighting Irish. Chiu replaced Todd Bernett, one of the winningest coaches in BC High School Football history.
