= Elfrid Payton (Canadian football) =

American gridiron football player (born 1967)

No. 56
- Position: Defensive end

Personal information
- Born: September 22, 1967 (age 59); Gretna, Louisiana, U.S.
- Listed height: 6 ft 3 in (1.91 m)
- Listed weight: 245 lb (111 kg)

Career information
- College: Grambling State

Career history
- 1991–1993: Winnipeg Blue Bombers
- 1994: Shreveport Pirates
- 1994–1995: Baltimore Stallions
- 1996–1999: Montreal Alouettes
- 2000: Winnipeg Blue Bombers
- 2001: Toronto Argonauts
- 2002–2003: Edmonton Eskimos
- 2004: Winnipeg Blue Bombers

Awards and highlights
- 2× Grey Cup champion (1995, 2003); CFL's Most Outstanding Defensive Player Award (2002); Norm Fieldgate Trophy (2002); James P. McCaffrey Trophy (1993); Dr. Beattie Martin Trophy (2002); 7× CFL All-Star (1993, 1995, 1997, 1998, 1999, 2001, 2002); 5× CFL East All-Star (1993, 1997, 1998, 1999, 2001); CFL West All-Star (2002)
- Canadian Football Hall of Fame (Class of 2010)

Elfrid Payton Sr. (born September 22, 1967) is an American former all-star gridiron football player in the Canadian Football League (CFL). Payton graduated from Grambling State University.

== Career ==
Payton played with seven different teams over the course of his career.

- 1991–1993 – Payton played with the Winnipeg Blue Bombers, where he was an all-star and James P. McCaffrey Trophy winner in 1993.
- 1994 – Payton started the season with the Shreveport Pirates, but finished with the Grey Cup finalist Baltimore CFLers, registering twenty seven tackles and four sacks.
- 1995 – Payton had eighteen sacks in an all-star season with the Grey Cup champion Baltimore Stallions.
- 1996–1999 – Payton had three all-star seasons (1997, 1998 and 1999) with the Montreal Alouettes.
- 2000 – Payton returned to the Winnipeg Blue Bombers.
- 2001 – Payton was an all-star with the Toronto Argonauts.
- 2002–2003 – Payton played with the Edmonton Eskimos, where he won the CFL's Most Outstanding Defensive Player Award and was an all star in 2002, and won a Grey Cup in 2003.
- 2004 – Payton returned to the Winnipeg Blue Bombers.

Payton played in 189 total regular season games, seventeen playoff games, and four Grey Cups. His 154 career sacks are the 2nd highest career total in CFL history.

== Post-career ==
In 2010 Payton was inducted into the Canadian Football Hall of Fame.

Payton's son, also named Elfrid, was a basketball player at the University of Louisiana at Lafayette who won the 2014 Lefty Driesell Award, and now plays for the New Orleans Pelicans of the National Basketball Association.
