= Steve Hardin (gridiron football) =

American gridiron football player (born 1971)

No. 66, 61
- Position: Guard

Personal information
- Born: December 30, 1971 (age 54); Bellevue, Washington
- Listed height: 6 ft 6 in (1.98 m)
- Listed weight: 330 lb (150 kg)

Career information
- College: Oregon

Career history
- 1995–1996: Indianapolis Colts
- 1996: Rhein Fire
- 1998–2002: BC Lions

Awards and highlights
- Grey Cup champion (2000); CFL West All-Star (2002); Tom Pate Memorial Award (2003)
- Stats at Pro Football Reference

Steve Hardin (born December 30, 1971) was a linebacker in the Canadian Football League, playing 5 seasons with the BC Lions.

A graduate of University of Oregon, Hardin played in the WLAF with the Rhein Fire in 1996, and used this as a springboard to get a chance with the NFL's Indianapolis Colts (he played one game for them in 1996.) He signed with the Leos in 1998 and won the Grey Cup with them in 2000 and was an all-star in 2002. Hardin's 2003 season and career was cut short as a pre-season injury forced him to miss the entire season. He won the Tom Pate Memorial Award for community service in 2003. He played 78 games for the Lions.
