= Terry Vaughn =

American gridiron football player (born 1971)

No. 2, 3
- Position: Slotback

Personal information
- Born: December 25, 1971 (age 54); Sumter, South Carolina, U.S.
- Listed height: 5 ft 8 in (1.73 m)
- Listed weight: 185 lb (84 kg)

Career information
- High school: Oceanside (Oceanside, California)
- College: Arizona

Career history
- 1995–1998: Calgary Stampeders
- 1999–2004: Edmonton Eskimos
- 2005: Montreal Alouettes
- 2006: Hamilton Tiger-Cats

Awards and highlights
- 2× Grey Cup champion (1998, 2003); 3× CFL All-Star (1998, 2001, 2002); 7× CFL West All-Star (1996, 1998–2003); 1,006 career receptions (1st in CFL history to reach 1,000); Second-team All-Pac-10 (1991); Eskimos records: Most consecutive receiving 1,000-YD seasons – career (6) - (1999-04); Most receptions – season (106) - 2003; Most receiving 1,000-YD seasons - career (6) - (1999-04); Most receiving Yards – game (275) - August 13, 1999
- Stats at CFL.ca
- Canadian Football Hall of Fame (Class of 2011)

Terry Vaughn (born December 25, 1971) is a former Canadian Football League (CFL) receiver most recently with the Hamilton Tiger-Cats. In 2005, Terry Vaughn's 1113 receiving yards combined with those of his teammates (Kerry Watkins's 1364 yards, Ben Cahoon's 1067 yards, and Dave Stala's 1037 yards) as the 2005 Montreal Alouettes became only the second team in CFL history to achieve four players all having over 1,000 yards receiving in the same season (the first being the 2004 Alouettes). On July 14, 2006, Vaughn became the all-time leader in receptions in the CFL, surpassing Darren Flutie's previous record of 973 receptions. Vaughn finished the season with 1,006 career receptions, a record which stood until Ben Cahoon broke it on October 11, 2010. Vaughn was the first player in CFL history to record 1,000 career receptions. Vaughn also holds the record for most 1,000+ yards receiving with 11, while also holding the record for most consecutive 1,000+ yards receiving, also with 11. He finished his career in fourth as the CFL's all-time receiving yards leader with 13,746 yards. He announced his retirement as a Calgary Stampeder near the beginning of the 2007 season.

Vaughn played college football at the University of Arizona. He played 12 seasons in the CFL for the Calgary Stampeders, Edmonton Eskimos, Montreal Alouettes and Hamilton Tiger-Cats. Vaughn was a three-time CFL all-star and played in five Grey Cup games, winning with Calgary in 1998 and Edmonton in 2003.

In November, 2006, Terry Vaughn was voted one of the CFL's Top 50 players (#45) of the league's modern era by Canadian sports network TSN.

Vaughn was inducted into the Canadian Football Hall of Fame in 2011.

Vaughn graduated from Oceanside High School.

Vaughn was inducted to the Edmonton Elks Wall of Honour on August 27, 2023. The induction night was also used to celebrate the 20th anniversary of Edmonton's 2003 Grey cup win.
