= Juran Bolden =

American football player (born 1974)

No. 5, 43, 46, 21
- Position: Cornerback

Personal information
- Born: June 27, 1974 (age 52); Tampa, Florida, U.S.
- Listed height: 6 ft 3 in (1.91 m)
- Listed weight: 210 lb (95 kg)

Career information
- High school: Hillsborough (Tampa, Florida)
- College: Mississippi Delta
- NFL draft: 1996: 4th round, 127th overall pick

Career history
- Winnipeg Blue Bombers (1995); Atlanta Falcons (1996–1998); Green Bay Packers (1998); Carolina Panthers (1998); Kansas City Chiefs (1999); Winnipeg Blue Bombers (2000–2001); Atlanta Falcons (2002–2003); Jacksonville Jaguars (2004); Tampa Bay Buccaneers (2005–2006); Winnipeg Blue Bombers (2007)

Career NFL statistics
- Total tackles: 191
- Forced fumbles: 2
- Fumble recoveries: 2
- Passes defended: 38
- Interceptions: 10
- Defensive touchdowns: 1
- Stats at Pro Football Reference

Juran T. Bolden (born June 27, 1974) is an American former professional football player who was a cornerback in the National Football League (NFL) and Canadian Football League (CFL). He was selected by the Atlanta Falcons in the fourth round of the 1996 NFL draft. He played high school football for Hillsborough High School in Tampa and collegiately at Mississippi Delta.

Bolden played for the Falcons, Green Bay Packers, Carolina Panthers, and Kansas City Chiefs. In 2000–2001, he played for the Winnipeg Blue Bombers of the CFL. He returned to the Falcons in 2002, then was traded to the Jacksonville Jaguars in 2004. He was signed as a free agent by the Tampa Bay Buccaneers in 2005.

On April 30, 2007, he was released by the Buccaneers and returned to the Blue Bombers. After missing the last three games of the season as well as the post-season, Bolden was released before the 2008 training camp on May 27, 2008.

== Personal life ==
Juran is the father of New England Patriots cornerback Isaiah Bolden.
