= Dave Mudge =

Canadian gridiron football player (born 1974)

Profile
- Position: Offensive tackle

Personal information
- Born: October 22, 1974 (age 52); Whitby, Ontario, Canada
- Listed height: 6 ft 7 in (2.01 m)
- Listed weight: 305 lb (138 kg)

Career information
- College: Michigan State
- CFL draft: 1997: 3rd round, 24th overall pick

Career history
- 1998: Buffalo Bills*
- 1999: Amsterdam Admirals
- 1999: Toronto Argonauts
- 2000–2005: Winnipeg Blue Bombers
- 2005–2008: Montreal Alouettes
- * Offseason or practice squad member only

Awards and highlights
- Most Outstanding Offensive Lineman (2001); 2× CFL All-Star (2001, 2002); CFL East All-Star (2001); CFL West All-Star (2002)
- Stats at CFL.ca

David Mudge (born October 22, 1974) is a Canadian former professional football offensive lineman who played in the Canadian Football League from 1997 to 1999 for the Toronto Argonauts, from 2000 to 2005 with the Winnipeg Blue Bombers and from 2005 to 2008 with the Montreal Alouettes. He won the CFL's Most Outstanding Offensive Lineman Award in 2001 while playing for the Blue Bombers. On February 16, 2009, he became a free agent. Since retiring from football, Mudge has worked Alouettes games for CJAD radio broadcasts of Montreal games. He joined the Alouettes Alumni Committee in late 2012.

After his professional football career, David Mudge joined CIBC Wood Gundy in 2015, five years after becoming an Investment Advisor and completing an MBA (Finance) from McGill University. In 2018, the Canadian Focused Equity portfolio was launched, which he now leads as Portfolio Manager.
