= Khari Jones =

American gridiron football player and coach (born 1971)

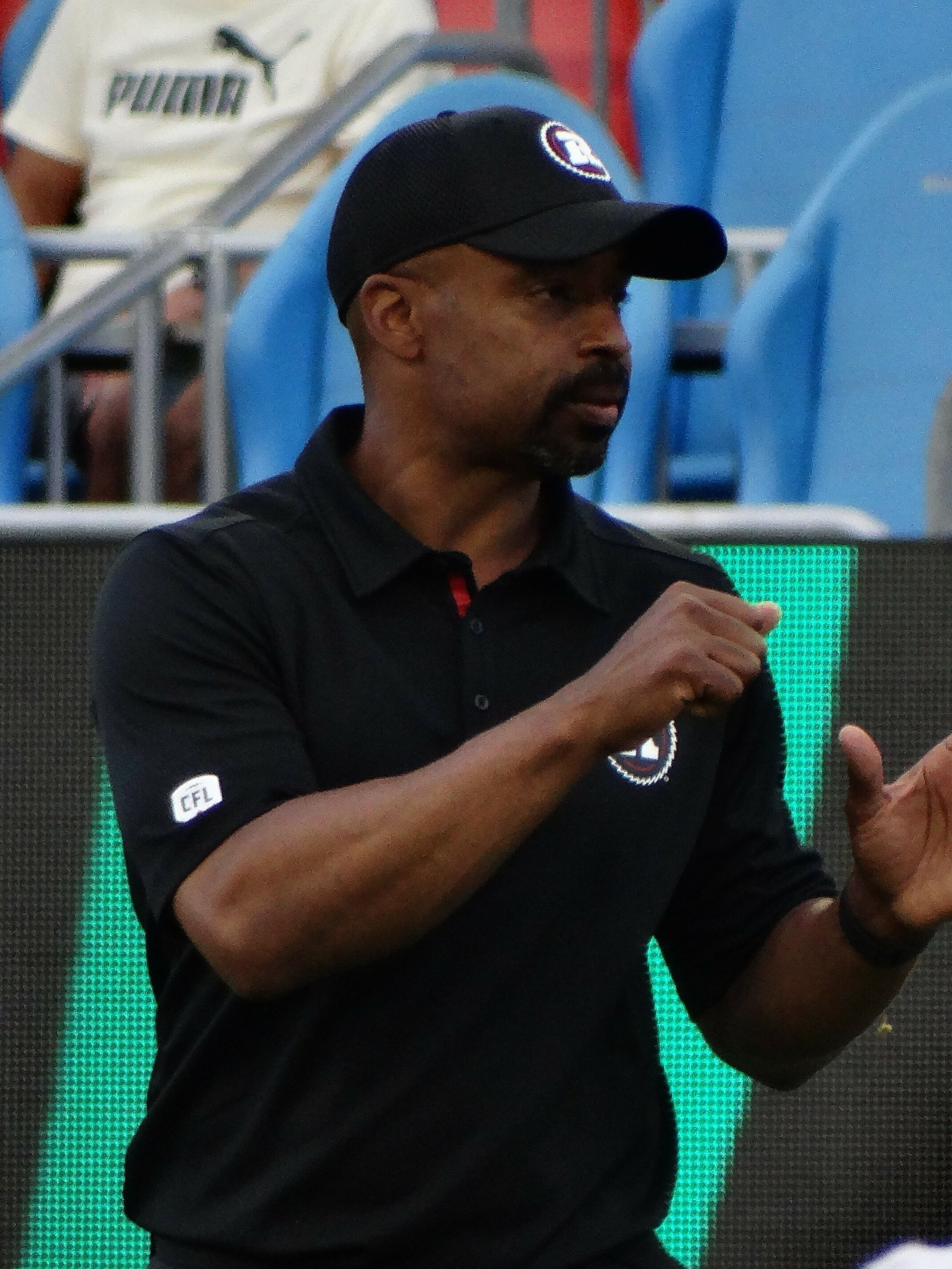
- Jones with the Ottawa Redblacks in 2023

UBC Thunderbirds
- Title: Offensive coordinator Assistant head coach
- CFL status: American

Personal information
- Born: May 16, 1971 (age 55); Hammond, Indiana, U.S.
- Listed height: 5 ft 11 in (1.80 m)
- Listed weight: 195 lb (88 kg)

Career information
- Position: Quarterback
- College: UC Davis

Career history

Playing
- 1995–1996: Albany Firebirds
- 1996: Scottish Claymores
- 1997–1999: BC Lions
- 2000–2004: Winnipeg Blue Bombers
- 2004: Calgary Stampeders
- 2005: Edmonton Eskimos*
- 2005: Hamilton Tiger-Cats
- 2006: Edmonton Eskimos*
- 2007: Winnipeg Blue Bombers
- * Offseason or practice squad member only

Coaching
- 2009–2010: Hamilton Tiger-Cats (QBC)
- 2011: Hamilton Tiger-Cats (OC)
- 2012–2013: Saskatchewan Roughriders (QBC)
- 2014–2017: BC Lions (OC)
- 2018: Montreal Alouettes (OC)
- 2019–2022: Montreal Alouettes (HC & OC)
- 2023: Ottawa Redblacks (OC/AHC)
- 2025–present: UBC Thunderbirds (OC)

Operations
- 2022: Hamilton Tiger-Cats (Football operations consultant)

Awards and highlights
- Grey Cup champion (2013); CFL MOP (2001); CFL All-Star (2001); CFL East All-Star (2001); CFL West All-Star (2002)
- Stats at CFL.ca (archive)

Khari Okang Jones (/kəˈhɑːri/ kə-HAH-ree; born May 16, 1971) is an American former professional football quarterback who is the offensive coordinator for the UBC Thunderbirds of U Sports. He was formerly the head coach for the Montreal Alouettes of the Canadian Football League (CFL). Jones played quarterback in the CFL, where he enjoyed his most success with the Winnipeg Blue Bombers. Jones also played briefly for the Arena Football League's Albany Firebirds and the World League of American Football's Scottish Claymores. He is also a former television sports reporter for the Canadian Broadcasting Corporation (CBC).He has also been the offensive coordinator for the BC Lions, Hamilton Tiger-Cats, and Ottawa Redblacks.

== Playing career ==
=== College career ===
Jones was a record setting college quarterback at the University of California, Davis, where in two seasons as a starter he became the first UC Davis quarterback to pass for over 3,000 yards in a season and over 50 touchdowns in a career, while leading the Aggies to a 17–2–1 record during his junior and senior seasons (1992–1993). In 2000, Jones was inducted into the UC Davis Aggies Hall of Fame.

=== Arena Football League & NFL Europe ===
Jones joined the Arena Football League's Albany Firebirds in 1995. For the next two seasons, he received very little playing time, making only 3 out of 5 pass completions in his first season, and 3 out of 4 pass completions in 1996. He also played one season in 1996 for the Scottish Claymores of the World League of American Football, which would later become NFL Europe.

=== Canadian Football League ===
In 1997, Jones signed with the BC Lions. Jones played very little during his three-year tenure with the Lions, as he was relegated to the backup spot behind incumbent quarterback Damon Allen.

In 2000, Jones joined the Winnipeg Blue Bombers. Though he initially served as a backup to Kerwin Bell, Jones eventually won the starting job during the middle of the 2000 season, thereby clearing the way for the Bombers to release Bell in midseason.

In 2001, Jones was the CFLs Most Outstanding Player after leading the Bombers to a 14–4 record, including 12 straight wins. Jones was the Bombers quarterback in the 2001 Grey Cup in Montreal, where heavily favoured Winnipeg lost to the Calgary Stampeders, 27–19.

Jones' following season (2002) was even better statistically, which included 5,353 passing yards and 46 touchdown passes. This was the third most passing touchdowns in a season (behind two seasons in which Doug Flutie completed 47 and 48)). From 2000 to 2002, Jones' 107 touchdown passes exceeded the record by any other quarterback in the CFL or NFL over the same period of time. In four seasons with Winnipeg, Jones set seventeen Bomber passing records, including throwing for five touchdowns in a game four times in one season.

During the 2004 CFL season, Jones was traded from the Blue Bombers to the Calgary Stampeders, partially due to a shoulder injury which had affected his play. In the off-season between the 2004 and 2005 seasons, the Stampeders signed free agent Henry Burris and Jones was released.

Jones attended the Edmonton Eskimos training camp at the beginning of the 2005 CFL season, but with the Eskimos signing Ricky Ray (and already having the 2004 season starter Jason Maas), Jones was released again. Midway through the 2005 season he signed with the Hamilton Tiger-Cats but was released after eight games.

Prior to the 2006 season Jones was signed by the Eskimos only to be released by them once more on June 10, 2006 as part of training camp cuts.

Three days later, on June 13, 2006, the CBC announced that Jones would be their sideline reporter for their CFL on CBC broadcasts.

On October 17, 2007, Jones inked a standard one-year contract plus an option with the Winnipeg Blue Bombers and then signed his retirement papers right after. This allowed him to officially retire in the city where he had the most success during his four-team, nine-year CFL career.

== Coaching career ==
In 2009, Jones began his coaching career as the quarterbacks coach for the Hamilton Tiger-Cats under head coach Marcel Bellefeuille. In 2011, he was promoted to offensive coordinator and helped the team to an appearance in the East Final.

On January 3, 2012, he was announced as part of the coaching staff for the Saskatchewan Roughriders as their quarterbacks coach. In 2013, he helped his team win the 101st Grey Cup.

Jones was a top candidate to become the new offensive coordinator for the BC Lions in 2014. Jones officially became the offensive coordinator on December 23, 2013.

On January 3, 2018, Jones was announced as the new offensive coordinator for the Montreal Alouettes for the 2018 CFL season. On June 8, 2019, less than a week before the start of the 2019 season, the Alouettes announced they had parted ways with Mike Sherman and promoted Jones to the role of head coach. Despite being thrust into the role six days before the start of the regular season, Jones and the Alouettes surpassed expectations and finished with a 10–8 record and in second place in the East Division. At the conclusion of the season, he was signed to a three-year contract extension to continue as the team's head coach and offensive coordinator.

With the 2020 CFL season cancelled, Jones did not coach in 2020. In 2021, the team regressed and finished in third place in the East Division with a 7–7 record and lost the East Semi-Final. With the team starting the 2022 season with a 1–3 record, Jones was fired on July 6, 2022.

On July 18, 2022, Jones was hired as a football operations consultant for the Hamilton Tiger-Cats.

On December 3, 2022, Jones was named the offensive coordinator and assistant head coach for the Ottawa Redblacks. However, after the Redblacks struggled to a 4–14 record in 2023, Jones was fired on November 3, 2023.

On January 15, 2025, Jones was hired as the quarterback coach of the UBC Thunderbirds football team.

=== Head coaching record ===
Team	Year	Regular season					Postseason		
Team	Year	Won	Lost	Ties	Win %	Finish	Won	Lost	Result
MTL	2019	10	8	0	.556	2nd in East Division	0	1	Lost in East Semi-Final
MTL	2020	Season Cancelled							
MTL	2021	7	7	0	.500	3rd in East Division	0	1	Lost in East Semi-Final
MTL	2022	1	3	0	.250	2nd in East Division	-	-	Fired
Total		18	18	0	.500	0 East Division; Championships	0	2	0 Grey Cups

== LivingWorks ==
In 2006, Jones became the digital co-trainer of the LivingWorks SafeTALK suicide alertness course. Jones had just finished playing football and was working as a broadcaster in Calgary, and was also working as an actor when his agent approached him with the job of recording the videos. Jones explained that "It hit home for me because suicide, or attempted suicide, has been a part of my family, as it has been for a lot of people. So it was something that was near and dear for me, and it quickly become more than an acting job". In the years since they were first recorded, Khari's videos have helped trainers present safeTALK to over 300,000 people in more than 20 countries and territories.

== Acting career ==
While attending University of California, Davis, Jones took acting classes which allowed him to get some roles in various made-for-TV movies.

=== Filmography ===
Film roles
Year	Title	Role	Notes
1998	She Smokes	Craig	Short
2006	I Dream of Murder	Police Officer	TV movie
2006	Touch the Top of the World	Wrestling Coach	TV movie
2008	Confessions of a Go-Go Girl	Yuppie Manager	TV movie
2008	Snow 2: Brain Freeze	Policeman #1	TV movie
2012	LUV	Kid	

== Personal life ==
Jones is a Canadian-American dual citizen and lives in Surrey, British Columbia with his wife, Justine, and daughters, Jaelyn and Siena. He is the son of Cauley Ray and Nina Maria Jones, and brother of filmmaker/podcaster Jamie Jamar Jones. Jones met his wife in a theatre course while both attended UC Davis and appeared in plays together while students.
