= LivingWorks =

Public service corporation

LivingWorks (registered as LivingWorks Education Inc.) is a public service corporation focusing on understanding and preventing suicide.

Founded in 1983 by four human service professionals from the fields of psychiatry, psychology and social work, their original suicide intervention programs were developed in collaboration with the governments of Alberta and California, and the Canadian Mental Health Association.

More than 1,000,000 community participants have been trained in suicide intervention skills through LivingWorks since 1983, including such diverse organizations as the U.S. Army and Irish Welfare department workers.

== Programs ==
LivingWorks programs focus on developing suicide awareness through programs such as suicideTALK, and safeTALK. Their Applied Suicide Intervention Skills Training (ASIST) program is built to teach people how to intervene with people who are actively having thoughts of suicide.

The organization trains people in communities to lead programs locally through a network of trainers across Canada, Australia, Norway and the United States, with smaller cores in Guam, Hong Kong, Russia and Singapore.
