= Rick Walters (Canadian football) =

Canadian football player (born 1971)

York Lions
- Title: Offensive coordinator
- CFL status: National

Personal information
- Born: July 19, 1971 (age 55); Mandeville, Jamaica
- Listed height: 5 ft 11 in (1.80 m)
- Listed weight: 195 lb (88 kg)

Career information
- University: Simon Fraser

Career history

Playing
- 1994–1998: Saskatchewan Roughriders
- 1999–2003: Edmonton Eskimos
- 2004: Calgary Stampeders

Coaching
- 2013–2023: Alberta Golden Bears (OC)
- 2024–present: York Lions (OC)

Awards and highlights
- Grey Cup champion (2003); Tom Pate Memorial Award (2001)

Rick Walters (born July 19, 1971) is a Canadian former professional football slotback in the Canadian Football League (CFL) and is the offensive coordinator for the York Lions of U Sports football. He is a Grey Cup champion after winning the 91st Grey Cup with the Edmonton Eskimos.

== Early life ==
Born in Mandeville, Jamaica, Walters moved with his family to Toronto, Ontario at age 7, and then on to Edmonton, Alberta. He played college football for the Simon Fraser Clan where he graduated from Simon Fraser University.

== Professional career ==
Walters joined the Saskatchewan Roughriders in 1994. In 1999, he joined his hometown Edmonton Eskimos for a 5-year stint, becoming a Grey Cup champion in 2003. In 2001, he won the prestigious Tom Pate Memorial Award for outstanding community service. He finished his career with a brief stay with the Calgary Stampeders, having caught 221 passes for 2629 yards, scoring 12 touchdowns, and rushing for another 187 yards.

== Coaching career ==
Walters served as head coach of the Edmonton Huskies junior football team from 2010 to 2012.

On June 11, 2024, Walters was named the offensive coordinator for the York Lions.

== Personal life ==
Walters is a volunteer with Kids Kottage and Kids with Cancer Society. Presently he works with the Government of Alberta as a Director of Special Projects including working on the 2009 Grey Cup in Calgary, the 2010 Winter Olympics in Vancouver and the 2010 Grey Cup in Edmonton. He lives in St. Albert with his wife Jana and their three children Halle, Raea and Bella.
