= 90th Grey Cup =

2002 Canadian Football championship game

Montreal Alouettes	Edmonton Eskimos
(13–5)	(13–5)
25	16
Head coach: Don Matthews	Head coach: Tom Higgins
	1	2	3	4	Total
Montreal Alouettes	1	10	0	14	25
Edmonton Eskimos	0	0	10	6	16
- Date: November 24, 2002
- Stadium: Commonwealth Stadium
- Location: Edmonton
- Most Valuable Player: Anthony Calvillo, QB (Alouettes)
- Most Valuable Canadian: Pat Woodcock, WR (Alouettes)
- National anthem: Meredith McLeod (French); Adam Gregory (English)
- Referee: Dave Yule
- Halftime show: Shania Twain
- Attendance: 62,531

Broadcasters
- Network: CBC, RDS
- Announcers: (CBC) Steve Armitage, Chris Walby, Brian Williams, Glen Suitor, Mark Lee
- Ratings: 5.2 million

The 90th Grey Cup was the 2002 Canadian Football League championship game played between the Edmonton Eskimos and the Montreal Alouettes on November 24 at Commonwealth Stadium, in Edmonton, Alberta. The Alouettes defeated the Eskimos 25–16 in the first all-Canadian CFL championship game to feature the host team since 1983.

It was Don Matthews' fifth Grey Cup title as a head coach, tying him with Lew Hayman, Frank Clair and Hugh Campbell for the all-time record.

This was last Grey Cup game to be played on natural grass in Edmonton. By the time Edmonton hosted its next Grey Cup game in 2010, its stadium had switched over to artificial turf. The Grey Cup would not be played on grass again until 2016 at Toronto's BMO Field. The league introduced its new logo four days before this game; it appeared on patches on the team's jerseys for this game.

This was the Alouettes first Grey Cup victory in 25 years, and first since their 1996 re-activation. The Grey Cup victory parade, held 2 days later in downtown Montreal attracted 250,000 fans.

== Game summary ==
Montreal Alouettes (25) - TDs, Pat Woodcock, Jeremaine Copeland (2); FGs Terry Baker (1); cons., (3); singles, Baker (1).

Edmonton Eskimos (16) - TDs, Rick Walters, Ed Hervey; FGs, Sean Fleming (1); cons., Fleming (1).

First quarter
MTL – Single Baker 68 yard punt went through the end zone 4:34 1 - 0 MTL
Second quarter
MTL – TD Woodcock 99 pass from Calvillo (Baker convert) 1:58 8 - 0 MTL
MTL – FG Baker 42 13:45 11 - 0 MTL
Third quarter
EDM – TD Walters 17 pass from Ray (Fleming convert) 2:58 11 - 7 MTL
EDM – FG Fleming 13 8:54 11 - 10 MTL
Fourth quarter
MTL – TD Copeland 47 pass from Calvillo (Baker convert) 3:07 18 - 10 MTL
EDM – TD Hervey 17 pass from Ray (convert failed) 14:41 18 - 16 MTL
MTL – TD Copeland 47 kick-off return (Baker convert) 14:48 25 - 16 MTL

A Grey Cup rivalry which was born in the 1950s (Edmonton and Montreal have met in 11 Grey Cup clashes) and intensified in the 1970s re-emerged in the new century on a frozen field at Commonwealth Stadium in Edmonton.

Montreal had not been home to a Grey Cup champion since 1977, including nine years when it didn't have a CFL team at all. But Anthony Calvillo and the rest of his teammates brought prestige back to the franchise by defeating the hometown Eskimos.

Leading 1-0 after 15 minutes, the Alouettes gained 99 yards on one play for what was, at the time, the longest touchdown reception in Grey Cup competition. Calvillo connected with Pat Woodcock on the historic play. The 99-yard pass-and-run play has since been surpassed during the 2017 Grey Cup Game when Ricky Ray completed a 100-yard pass in the first half of the Toronto Argonauts 2017 Grey Cup win.

Terry Baker kicked a 42-yard field goal with 1:15 remaining in the second quarter to give the Alouettes an 11-0 lead at halftime.

Wanting to avoid becoming the first team to lose a Grey Cup game in their own building since 1983, the Eskimos rallied in the third quarter. On their opening drive Edmonton finally got on the scoreboard as Ricky Ray threw a pass to Ricky Walters for a 17-yard touchdown. Sean Fleming kicked a 12-yard field goal later in the quarter to pull the Eskimos within one.

But early in the fourth quarter, the Alouettes struck again. This time Calvillo hit Jeremaine Copeland on a 47-yard passing play for a touchdown, giving Montreal an 18-10 advantage.

With less than six minutes remaining in regulation and the Eskimos offence facing a third-and-10 on the Montreal 36, head coach Tom Higgins opted to go for it rather than attempt a 43-yard field goal. The gamble failed.

The Eskimos would make things uncomfortable for the Alouettes in the final minute. Ray connected with Ed Hervey on a 17-yard touchdown pass with 19 seconds remaining in regulation. Needing a two-point convert to tie the score, Tim Strickland broke up a pass intended for Terry Vaughn.

Edmonton tried one last-ditch effort with an onside kick attempt, but Copeland grabbed the football and ran 47 yards for his second touchdown, sealing the win for Montreal.

Calvillo was named the game's Most Valuable Player completing just 11 of 31 pass attempts for 260 yards and a pair of touchdowns.

== Entertainment ==
The Canadian national anthem was sung in French by Meredith McLeod followed by an English version sung by teen country singer and Edmonton native Adam Gregory.

Country singer Shania Twain performed at the halftime show.

== 2002 CFL Playoffs ==
=== West Division ===
Semi-final (November 10 @ Winnipeg, Manitoba) Winnipeg Blue Bombers 30-3 BC Lions

Final (November 17 @ Edmonton, Alberta) Edmonton Eskimos 33-30 Winnipeg Blue Bombers

=== East Division ===
Semi-final (November 10 @ Toronto, Ontario) Toronto Argonauts 24-14 Saskatchewan Roughriders*

Final (November 17 @ Montreal, Quebec) Montreal Alouettes 35-18 Toronto Argonauts

* Cross over from West Division
