= Marvin Coleman =

American gridiron football player (born 1972)

No. 47
- Positions: Cornerback, Kick returner

Personal information
- Born: January 31, 1972 (age 54); Ocala, Florida, U.S.
- Listed height: 5 ft 9 in (1.75 m)
- Listed weight: 170 lb (77 kg)

Career information
- College: Central State, Ohio

Career history
- 1994–2000: Calgary Stampeders
- 2001: San Francisco Demons
- 2001–2003: Winnipeg Blue Bombers

Awards and highlights
- Grey Cup champion (1998); 3× CFL All-Star (1996, 1997, 2000); CFL East All-Star (2001); 4× CFL West All-Star (1996, 1997, 1998, 2000)

Career CFL statistics
- Games played: 166
- Tackles: 538
- Interceptions: 28
- Kick return yards: 11,545
- Touchdowns: 13
- Canadian Football Hall of Fame (Class of 2024)

Marvin Coleman (born January 31, 1972) is an American former professional football defensive back who played in the Canadian Football League for ten years. Coleman played for the Calgary Stampeders and the Winnipeg Blue Bombers from 1994 to 2003. He was a CFL All-Star three times.

Coleman was announced as a member of the Canadian Football Hall of Fame 2024 class on May 3, 2024.
