= Harold Nash =

American football player and coach (born 1970)

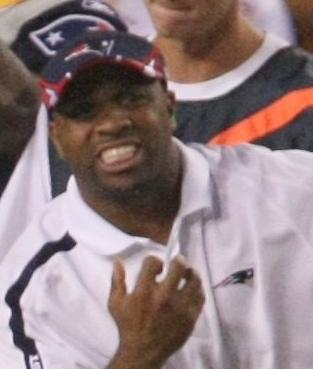
- Nash during an August 28, 2009 preseason game against the Washington Redskins.

Dallas Cowboys
- Title: Strength and conditioning coach

Personal information
- Born: May 5, 1970 (age 56); New Orleans, Louisiana, U.S.

Career information
- Position: Defensive back
- High school: St. Augustine (New Orleans, Louisiana)
- College: Louisiana-Lafayette
- NFL draft: 1993: undrafted

Career history

Playing
- New York Giants (1993); Shreveport Pirates (1994–1995); Montreal Alouettes (1996–1999); Winnipeg Blue Bombers (1999–2003); Edmonton Eskimos (2004)

Coaching
- New England Patriots (2005–2010) Assistant strength and conditioning coach; New England Patriots (2011–2015) Strength and conditioning coach; Detroit Lions (2016–2019) Strength and conditioning coach; Dallas Cowboys (2020–present) Strength and conditioning coach

Awards and highlights
- Super Bowl champion (XLIX)

Harold Nash, Jr. (born May 5, 1970) is an American football strength and conditioning coach of the National Football League (NFL). He is also a former defensive back in the Canadian Football League (CFL).

== Playing career ==
Nash attended St. Augustine High School in New Orleans, Louisiana where he played defensive back. He then attended the University of Southwestern Louisiana, where he went from a walk-on defensive back in 1988 to being voted a permanent team captain by 1992. After spending training camp with the NFL's New York Giants in 1993, Nash moved to the CFL. He first joined the expansion Shreveport Pirates (1994–1995) who folded at the conclusion of the 1995 season. Nash later joined the Montreal Alouettes (1996–1999), but midway through the 1999 season, joined the Winnipeg Blue Bombers (1999–2003) with whom he set a team record for all-time pass knockdowns. He played his final CFL season with the Edmonton Eskimos. In total, Nash recorded 367 tackles and 24 interceptions throughout his CFL career. He was also named a CFL All-Star three times.

== Coaching career ==
After retiring from the CFL after their 2004 season, Nash joined the Patriots as an assistant strength and conditioning coach for their 2005 season. He was promoted to head strength and conditioning coach for the 2011 season. He won his first Super Bowl title when the Patriots defeated the Seattle Seahawks in Super Bowl XLIX.

On January 29, 2016, Nash was hired as the head strength and conditioning coach for the Detroit Lions. On January 3, 2020, Nash was fired by head coach Matt Patricia.

== Personal life ==
Nash has a son.
