= 2003 Montreal Alouettes season =

Canadian football team season

- Head coach: Don Matthews
- Home stadium: Molson Stadium

Results
- Record: 13–5
- Division place: 1st, East
- Playoffs: Lost Grey Cup

Uniform

The 2003 Montreal Alouettes finished in first place in the East Division with a 13–5 record. For the second year in a row, they defeated the Toronto Argonauts in the East Final, advancing to face Edmonton for the second Grey Cup in a row. The Alouettes lost to the Eskimos 34–22 in the Grey Cup.

== Offseason ==
=== CFL draft ===
Round	Pick	Player	Position	School/Club team
1	9	Andrew Noel	WR	Acadia
2	14	Richard Karikari	CB	St. Francis Xavier
2	18	Kerry Carter	RB	Stanford
3	27	Mat Brandt	WR	Miami (Ohio)
4	35	Paul Archer	OL	St. Mary's
5	44	Mathieu Bertrand	QB	Laval
6	50	Dave Stala	K	St. Mary's
6	51	Michael Botterill	LB	McMaster
6	53	Ed Becker	K	Wilfrid Laurier

== Preseason ==
Week	Date	Opponent	Venue	Score	Result	Attendance	Record
A	May 30	at Ottawa Renegades	Frank Clair Stadium	21–19	Loss	22,802	0–1
B	June 7	Ottawa Renegades	PEPS Stadium	54–23	Win	10,358	1–1

== Regular season ==
=== Season standings ===
East Division
Pos	Team	Pld	W	L	T	PF	PA	PD	Pts
1	Montreal Alouettes (C, Q)	18	13	5	0	562	409	+153	26
2	Toronto Argonauts (Q)	18	9	9	0	473	433	+40	18
3	Ottawa Renegades (Q)	18	7	11	0	467	581	−114	14
4	Hamilton Tiger-Cats	18	1	17	0	293	583	−290	2

Source: "CFL.ca". Archived from the original on 2009-06-29.
(C) First round bye; (Q) Qualified for playoffs

=== Season schedule ===
Week	Date	Opponent	Venue	Score	Result	Attendance	Record
1	June 17	at Calgary Stampeders	McMahon Stadium	23–20 (OT)	Win	30,102	1–0
2	June 21	at Edmonton Eskimos	Commonwealth Stadium	34–16	Win	30,109	2–0
3	Bye						
4	July 4	at Saskatchewan Roughriders	Taylor Field	32–31	Win	23,295	3–0
5	July 12	BC Lions	Molson Stadium	28–27	Loss	20,202	3–1
6	July 19	Calgary Stampeders	Molson Stadium	36–25	Win	20,202	4–1
7	July 24	at Winnipeg Blue Bombers	Canad Inns Stadium	50–19	Win	28,484	5–1
8	July 29	Winnipeg Blue Bombers	Molson Stadium	37–27	Win	20,202	6–1
9	Aug 8	Hamilton Tiger-Cats	Molson Stadium	30–17	Win	20,202	7–1
10	Aug 16	at Hamilton Tiger-Cats	Ivor Wynne Stadium	28–10	Win	14,169	8–1
11	Aug 21	Toronto Argonauts	Molson Stadium	46–22	Win	20,202	9–1
12	Aug 29	at Ottawa Renegades	Frank Clair Stadium	43–38	Loss	24,583	9–2
13	Bye						
14	Sept 14	Ottawa Renegades	Molson Stadium	30–10	Win	20,202	10–2
15	Sept 21	Saskatchewan Roughriders	Molson Stadium	28–23	Win	20,202	11–2
16	Sept 27	at Hamilton Tiger-Cats	Ivor Wynne Stadium	30–17	Win	14,048	12–2
17	Oct 5	Edmonton Eskimos	Molson Stadium	20–19	Loss	20,202	12–3
18	Oct 11	at BC Lions	BC Place Stadium	28–24	Loss	21,046	12–4
19	Oct 17	at Toronto Argonauts	SkyDome	45–13	Loss	14,921	12–5
20	Oct 26	Ottawa Renegades	Molson Stadium	38–7	Win	20,202	13–5

== Roster ==
2003 Montreal Alouettes final roster
Quarterbacks: 1 Tavares Bolden; 13 Anthony Calvillo; 7 Ted White; Running backs: 33 Bruno Heppell; 5 Éric Lapointe; 21 Deonce Whitaker; Receivers: 86 Ben Cahoon; 82 Kwame Cavil; 80 Jeremaine Copeland; 3 Sylvain Girard; 85 Brian Nugent; 88 Dave Stala; 6 Keith Stokes; 16 Pat Woodcock	Offensive linemen: 68 Bryan Chiu C; 57 Scott Flory G; 66 Neal Fort T; 61 Luke Fritz G/T; 65 Paul Lambert G; 53 Uzooma Okeke T; Defensive linemen: 99 Oby Arah DE; 78 Adriano Belli DT; 54 Marc Megna DE; 75 Ed Philion DT; 93 Jason Richards DT; 96 Teto Simpson DT; 58 Anwar Stewart DE	Linebackers: 30 Michael Botterill; 19 Philippe Girard; 44 Kevin Johnson; Defensive backs: 25 Duane Butler; 8 Reggie Durden; 35 Stéphane Fortin; 34 D. J. Johnson; 18 Will Loftus; 31 Barron Miles; 9 Wayne Shaw; 38 Tim Strickland; 37 Brandon Williams; Special teams: 11 Matt Kellett K/P	Injured list: 15 Adrian Archie LB; 94 Robert Brown DT; 69 Brad Collinson C; 17 Patrick Dorvélus LB; 24 Omar Evans DB; 51 Aaron Fiacconi T; 26 Donta Greene WR; 64 Sherko Haji-Rasouli G/T; 23 Richard Karikari DB; 91 Mat Petz DE; 12 Mark Thompson LB; Italics indicate American player

== Playoffs ==
=== Scotiabank East Final ===
Team	Q1	Q2	Q3	Q4	Total
Toronto Argonauts	5	14	0	7	26
Montreal Alouettes	3	10	10	7	30

=== Grey Cup ===
Team	Q1	Q2	Q3	Q4	Total
Edmonton Eskimos	7	17	0	10	34
Montreal Alouettes	0	21	1	0	22

== Awards ==
=== 2003 CFL All-Star Selections ===
- Anthony Calvillo – Quarterback
- Jeremaine Copeland – Slotback
- Uzooma Okeke – Offensive Tackle
- Scott Flory – Offensive Guard
- Bryan Chiu – Centre

=== 2003 CFL Eastern All-Star Selections ===
- Anthony calvillo – Quarterback
- Ben Cahoon – Slotback
- Jeremaine copeland – Slotback
- Kwame Cavil – Wide Receiver
- Neal Fort – Offensive Tackle
- Uzooma okeke – Offensive Tackle
- Scott flory – Offensive Guard
- Bryan chiu – Centre
- Anwar Stewart – Defensive End
- Ed Philion – Defensive Tackle
- Kevin Johnson – Linebacker
- Tim Strickland – Linebacker
- Barron Miles – Defensive Back
