= 2003 Saskatchewan Roughriders season =

CFL team season

- General manager: Roy Shivers
- Head coach: Danny Barrett
- Home stadium: Taylor Field

Results
- Record: 11–7
- Division place: 3rd, West
- Playoffs: Lost West Final
- Team MOP: Travis Moore
- Team MOC: Chris Szarka
- Team MOR: Kenton Keith

Uniform

The 2003 Saskatchewan Roughriders finished in third place in the West Division with an 11–7 record. They defeated the Winnipeg Blue Bombers in the West Semi-Final, but lost the West Final to the Edmonton Eskimos.

== Offseason ==
=== CFL draft ===
Round	Pick	Player	Position	School/Club team
3	23	Mike McCullough	Linebacker	St. Francis Xavier
4	31	Jim Merrick	Offensive Guard	McGill
5	40	Mike Thomas	Receiver	Regina
6	49	Adrian Olenick	Offensive lineman	Saskatchewan

=== Preseason ===
Week	Date	Opponent	Score	Result	Attendance
A	Sat, May 31	vs. Winnipeg Blue Bombers	51–17	Win	27,331
B	Thurs, June 5	at Edmonton Eskimos	17–10	Loss	31,450

== Regular season ==
=== Season standings ===
West Division
Pos	Team	Pld	W	L	T	PF	PA	PD	Pts
1	Edmonton Eskimos (C, Q)	18	13	5	0	569	414	+155	26
2	Winnipeg Blue Bombers (Q)	18	11	7	0	514	487	+27	22
3	Saskatchewan Roughriders (Q)	18	11	7	0	535	430	+105	22
4	BC Lions (Q)	18	11	7	0	531	430	+101	22
5	Calgary Stampeders	18	5	13	0	323	501	−178	10

Source: "CFL.ca". Archived from the original on 2009-06-29.
(C) First round bye; (Q) Qualified for playoffs

=== Season schedule ===
Week	Date	Opponent	Score	Result	Attendance	Record
1	Thurs, June 19	at Toronto Argonauts	20–18	Win	15,126	1–0
2	Sat, June 28	vs. BC Lions	32–30	Win	22,155	2–0
3	Fri, July 4	vs. Montreal Alouettes	32–31	Loss	23,295	2–1
4	Thurs, July 10	at Winnipeg Blue Bombers	29–27	Loss	28,495	2–2
5	Sun, July 20	vs. Hamilton Tiger-Cats	42–9	Win	23,510	3–2
6	Fri, July 25	vs. Edmonton Eskimos	32–14	Win	26,767	4–2
7	Fri, Aug 1	at Calgary Stampeders	27–11	Win	34,260	5–2
8	Thurs, Aug 7	at Ottawa Renegades	29–24	Loss	21,817	5–3
9	Sun, Aug 17	vs. Ottawa Renegades	51–41	Win	26,772	6–3
10	Sat, Aug 23	at Edmonton Eskimos	49–31	Loss	45,083	6–4
11	Sun, Aug 31	vs. Winnipeg Blue Bombers	36–18	Loss	40,320	6–5
12	Sat, Sept 6	vs. BC Lions	28–2	Win	27,495	7–5
13	Fri, Sept 12	at Hamilton Tiger-Cats	27–24 (OT)	Loss	14,313	7–6
14	Sun, Sept 21	at Montreal Alouettes	28–23	Loss	20,202	7–7
15	Sun, Sept 28	vs. Toronto Argonauts	41–24	Win	30,249	8–7
16	Bye					
17	Mon, Oct 13	vs. Calgary Stampeders	24–22	Win	43,613	9–7
18	Sun, Oct 19	at Calgary Stampeders	34–6	Win	34,287	10–7
19	Sat, Oct 25	at BC Lions	26–23	Win	29,706	11–7

# Games played with primary home uniforms.
# Games played with primary white uniforms.
# Games played with black uniforms.

== Roster ==
2003 Saskatchewan Roughriders final roster
Quarterbacks: 10 Henry Burris; 5 Kevin Glenn; 15 Nealon Greene; Running backs: 32 Simon Baffoe; 19 Corey Holmes; 28 Kenton Keith; 33 Chris Szarka; Receivers: 88 Matt Dominguez; 87 Jason French; 2 Corey Grant; 83 Travis Moore; 89 Jamel Richardson; 85 Patrick Thibeault	Offensive linemen: 59 Jocelyn Frenette C/G; 68 Andrew Greene G; 52 Donald Heaven G/T; 66 Rob Lazeo G; 60 Gene Makowsky T; 54 Jeremy O'Day C; 53 Charles Thomas T; Defensive linemen: 92 Marcus Adams DE; 98 Nathan Davis DT; 93 Phil Gibson DT; 58 Shonte Peoples DE; 96 Scott Schultz DT; Special teams: 4 Paul McCallum K/P	Linebackers: 9 Reggie Hunt; 99 Mike McCullough; 37 Terrence Melton; Defensive backs: 31 Davin Bush; 29 Eddie Davis; 8 Lawrence Deck; 11 Darnell Edwards; 21 Jason Mallett; 38 Dennis Mavrin; 1 LaDouphyous McCalla; 24 Jackie Mitchell; 3 Omarr Morgan; 20 Kennedy Nkeyasen; 14 Bobby Perry	Injured list: 95 Andre Brown DE; 12 Ian Butler QB; 26 Scott Gordon DB; 82 Lloyd Henry WR; 51 Chris Hoople LB; 65 Tango McCauley T; 86 Kevin Nickerson SB; 48 Trevis Smith LB; 91 Rob Stewart DT; 27 Jabir Walker DB; Italics indicate American player

== Awards and records ==
- CFL's Most Outstanding Offensive Lineman Award – Andrew Greene

=== CFL All-Star selections ===
- Andrew Greene, Offensive Guard
- Reggie Hunt, Linebacker
- Jackie Mitchell, Linebacker
- Omarr Morgan, Corner Back

=== Western All-Star selections ===
- Nate Davis, Defensive Tackle
- Andrew Greene, Offensive Guard
- Reggie Hunt, Linebacker
- Paul McCallum, Placekicker
- Jackie Mitchell, Linebacker
- Omarr Morgan, Corner Back
- Jeremy O'Day, Centre

== Playoffs ==
=== West Semi-Final ===
Team	Q1	Q2	Q3	Q4	Total
Saskatchewan Roughriders	17	3	0	17	37
Winnipeg Blue Bombers	0	8	10	3	21

=== West Final ===
Team	Q1	Q2	Q3	Q4	Total
Saskatchewan Roughriders	0	1	1	21	23
Edmonton Eskimos	2	7	14	7	30
