= 2003 BC Lions season =

Canadian football team season

- Owner: David Braley
- General manager: Wally Buono
- President: Bob Ackles
- Head coach: Wally Buono
- Home stadium: BC Place Stadium

Results
- Record: 11–7
- Division place: 4th, West
- Playoffs: Lost East Semi-Final

Uniform

The 2003 BC Lions finished in fourth place in the West Division with an 11–7 record, but they made the playoffs because of the "cross-over" rule. They appeared in the East-Semi Final.

During the off-season, Bob Ackles engineered the move of longtime Calgary coach Wally Buono to the Lions. The Lions were also aggressive in free agency signing former Stampeder Dave Dickensen as quarterback.

The Lions wore orange alternate uniforms c. 1954 to celebrate the team's 50th season.

== Offseason ==
=== CFL draft ===
Rd	Pick	Player	Position	School
1	6	Paris Jackson	WR	Utah
2	16	Javier Glatt	LB	British Columbia
3	24	Carl Gourgues	OL	Laval
5	41	Nicholas Hoffman	RB	McGill

== Preseason ==
Week	Date	Opponent	Score	Result	Attendance	Record
B	June 3	at Calgary Stampeders	26–19	Loss	25,013	0–1
C	June 10	vs. Edmonton Eskimos	38–9	Loss	12,319	0–2

== Regular season ==
=== Season standings ===
West Division
Pos	Team	Pld	W	L	T	PF	PA	PD	Pts
1	Edmonton Eskimos (C, Q)	18	13	5	0	569	414	+155	26
2	Winnipeg Blue Bombers (Q)	18	11	7	0	514	487	+27	22
3	Saskatchewan Roughriders (Q)	18	11	7	0	535	430	+105	22
4	BC Lions (Q)	18	11	7	0	531	430	+101	22
5	Calgary Stampeders	18	5	13	0	323	501	−178	10

Source: "CFL.ca". Archived from the original on 2009-06-29.
(C) First round bye; (Q) Qualified for playoffs

=== Season schedule ===
Week	Date	Opponent	Score	Result	Attendance	Record
1	June 20	vs. Winnipeg Blue Bombers	34–27	Loss	20,191	0–1
2	June 28	at Saskatchewan Roughriders	32–30	Loss	22,155	0–2
3	July 3	vs. Toronto Argonauts	30–27 (OT)	Win	20,131	1–2
4	July 12	at Montreal Alouettes	28–27	Win	20,202	2–2
5	July 18	at Ottawa Renegades	48–14	Win	23,800	3–2
6	July 24	vs. Ottawa Renegades	37–18	Win	21,554	4–2
7	Aug 1	at Toronto Argonauts	28–26 (2OT)	Loss	15,623	4–3
8	Aug 8	vs. Calgary Stampeders	48–4	Win	24,222	5–3
9	Aug 16	at Calgary Stampeders	30–7	Win	30,217	6–3
10	Aug 22	vs. Hamilton Tiger-Cats	47–25	Win	23,010	7–3
11	Bye					7–3
12	Sept 6	at Saskatchewan Roughriders	28–2	Loss	27,495	7–4
13	Sept 13	vs. Edmonton Eskimos	34–30	Loss	27,070	7–5
14	Sept 20	at Winnipeg Blue Bombers	26–20	Win	27,605	8–5
15	Sept 26	at Edmonton Eskimos	27–7	Loss	44,432	8–6
16	Oct 4	vs. Winnipeg Blue Bombers	35–31	Win	25,591	9–6
17	Oct 11	vs. Montreal Alouettes	28–24	Win	21,046	10–6
18	Oct 18	at Hamilton Tiger-Cats	29–23	Win	13,106	11–6
19	Oct 25	vs. Saskatchewan Roughriders	26–23	Loss	29,706	11–7

== Player stats ==
=== Passing ===
Player	Att.	Comp	%	Yards	TD	INT	Rating
Dave Dickenson	549	370	67.4	5496	36	12	112.7
Spergon Wynn	65	46	70.8	626	4	1	115.3
Geroy Simon	2	1	50.0	52	1	0	158.3
Casey Printers	2	1	50.0	4	1	0	158.3

=== Rushing ===
Player	Att.	Yards	Avg.	Longest	TD
Kelvin Anderson	188	1048	5.6	52	6
Dave Dickenson	44	311	7.1	21	2
Geroy Simon	7	135	19.3	88	1
Spergon Wynn	28	126	4.5	31	1
Mark Nohra	25	123	4.9	29	0

=== Receiving ===
Player	No.	Yards	Avg.	Long	TD
Geroy Simon	94	1687	17.9	103	13
Chris Brazzell	68	1111	16.3	74	6
Ryan Thelwell	59	925	15.7	62	4
Frank Cutolo	64	908	14.2	70	8
Jason Clermont	41	615	15.0	39	7

== Awards and records ==
- Frank Cutolo, Outstanding Rookie
- Dave Dickenson, Jeff Nicklin Memorial Trophy
- Steve Hardin, Tom Pate Memorial Award

=== 2003 CFL All-Stars ===
- Ray Jacobs, Defensive End
- Geroy Simon, Slotback
- Barrin Simpson, Linebacker

=== Western Division All-Star Selections ===
- Eric Carter, Cornerback
- Dave Dickenson, Quarterback
- Ray Jacobs, Defensive End
- Cory Mantyka, Offensive Tackle
- Geroy Simon, Slotback
- Barrin Simpson, Linebacker
- Mark Washington, Safety

== Playoffs ==
=== East Semi-Final ===
Team	Q1	Q2	Q3	Q4	Total
Toronto Argonauts	0	13	8	7	28
BC Lions	0	7	0	0	7

== Roster ==
2003 BC Lions final roster
Quarterbacks: 12 Dave Dickenson; 4 Casey Printers; 13 Spergon Wynn; Running backs: 32 Kelvin Anderson; 28 Lyle Green; 20 Mark Nohra; Receivers: 8 Bret Anderson; 85 Chris Brazzell; 84 Bill Chamberlain; 82 Jason Clermont; 86 Frank Cutolo; 19 Paris Jackson; 81 Geroy Simon; 18 Harvey Stables	Offensive linemen: 50 Tim Bakker G; 59 Kelly Bates G; 55 Ben Fairbrother G; 68 Cory Mantyka T; 69 Freddie Moore T; 57 Dan Payne T; 64 Angus Reid C; Defensive linemen: 53 Ray Jacobs DE; 97 Brent Johnson DE; 95 Cameron Legault DT; 93 Marc Pilon DT; 91 Herman Smith DE; 96 Tyrone Williams DT	Linebackers: 26 Carl Kidd; 33 Kelly Lochbaum; 20 Ron Ockimey; 51 Barrin Simpson; Defensive backs: 27 Brock Balog; 18 Jayson Bray; 2 Eric Carter; 37 Perry Carter; 21 Shad Criss; 10 Jason Crumb; 29 Jason Olford; 39 Tony Walker; 23 Mark Washington	Special teams: 7 Curtis Head K/P; Injured list: 24 Da'Shann Austin DB; 1 David Byrd DB; 6 Javier Glatt LB; 61 Steve Hardin T; 17 Bo Lewis DB; 63 O'Lester Pope T; 3 Ryan Thelwell WR; 36 Art Tolhurst DB; 94 Jeff Traversy DT; 99 David Warren DE; Suspended: Marshaun Tucker WR; Italics indicate International player
