= 2003 Edmonton Eskimos season =

Canadian football team season

- Head coach: Tom Higgins
- Home stadium: Commonwealth Stadium

Results
- Record: 13–5
- Division place: 1st, West
- Playoffs: Won Grey Cup
- Team MVP: Ricky Ray, QB
- Team ROY: Robert Grant, DB

Uniform

The 2003 Edmonton Eskimos finished first in the West Division with a 13–5 record and won the Grey Cup in a rematch of the previous year's championship game.

== Offseason ==
=== CFL draft ===
| Round | Pick | Player | Position | School/Club team |
|---|---|---|---|---|
| 1 | 4 | Emmanuel Casseus | LB | Michigan |
| 1 | 8 | Randy Spencer | DT | Weber State |
| 2 | 10 | Kojo Aidoo | FB | McMaster |
| 3 | 20 | Dounia Whitehouse | CB | Charleston Southern |
| 3 | 26 | Joseph Bonaventura | LB | Saint Mary's |
| 4 | 34 | Larry Ram | OL | Florida A&M |
| 6 | 52 | Didier Ormejuste | DL | Toledo |

== Preseason ==
=== Schedule ===
| # | Date | Visitor | Score | Home | OT | Attendance | Record | Pts |
| A | Bye | | | | | | | |
| B | June 5 | Saskatchewan Roughriders | 10–17 | Edmonton Eskimos | | 31,450 | 1–0 | 2 |
| C | June 10 | Edmonton Eskimos | 38–9 | BC Lions | | 12,319 | 2–0 | 4 |

== Regular season ==
=== Season standings ===
West Division
| Pos | Team | Pld | W | L | T | PF | PA | PD | Pts |
|---|---|---|---|---|---|---|---|---|---|
| 1 | Edmonton Eskimos (C, Q) | 18 | 13 | 5 | 0 | 569 | 414 | +155 | 26 |
| 2 | Winnipeg Blue Bombers (Q) | 18 | 11 | 7 | 0 | 514 | 487 | +27 | 22 |
| 3 | Saskatchewan Roughriders (Q) | 18 | 11 | 7 | 0 | 535 | 430 | +105 | 22 |
| 4 | BC Lions (Q) | 18 | 11 | 7 | 0 | 531 | 430 | +101 | 22 |
| 5 | Calgary Stampeders | 18 | 5 | 13 | 0 | 323 | 501 | −178 | 10 |

Source: "CFL.ca". Archived from the original on 2009-06-29.
(C) First round bye; (Q) Qualified for playoffs

=== Season schedule ===
| Week | Date | Visitor | Score | Home | OT | Attendance | Record | Pts |
| 1 | June 21 | Montreal Alouettes | 34–16 | Edmonton Eskimos | | 30,109 | 0–1–0 | 0 |
| 2 | June 26 | Calgary Stampeders | 24–34 | Edmonton Eskimos | | 30,568 | 1–1–0 | 2 |
| 3 | July 1 | Edmonton Eskimos | 12–14 | Winnipeg Blue Bombers | | 28,495 | 1–2–0 | 2 |
| 3 | July 5 | Edmonton Eskimos | 37–20 | Hamilton Tiger-Cats | | 12,492 | 2–2–0 | 4 |
| 4 | Bye | | | | | | 2–2–0 | 4 |
| 5 | July 16 | Hamilton Tiger-Cats | 15–52 | Edmonton Eskimos | | 33,785 | 3–2–0 | 6 |
| 6 | July 25 | Edmonton Eskimos | 14–32 | Saskatchewan Roughriders | | 26,767 | 3–3–0 | 6 |
| 7 | July 31 | Edmonton Eskimos | 31–26 | Ottawa Renegades | | 21,200 | 4–3–0 | 8 |
| 8 | Aug 9 | Toronto Argonauts | 20–49 | Edmonton Eskimos | | 44,205 | 5–3–0 | 10 |
| 9 | Aug 17 | Edmonton Eskimos | 18–15 | Toronto Argonauts | | 11,021 | 6–3–0 | 12 |
| 10 | Aug 23 | Saskatchewan Roughriders | 31–49 | Edmonton Eskimos | | 45,083 | 7–3–0 | 14 |
| 11 | Sept 1 | Edmonton Eskimos | 22–28 | Calgary Stampeders | | 36,251 | 7–4–0 | 14 |
| 12 | Sept 5 | Calgary Stampeders | 0–38 | Edmonton Eskimos | | 62,444* | 8–4–0 | 14 |
| 13 | Sept 13 | Edmonton Eskimos | 34–30 | BC Lions | | 27,070 | 9–4–0 | 16 |
| 14 | Sept 19 | Ottawa Renegades | 33–45 | Edmonton Eskimos | | 35,264 | 10–4–0 | 16 |
| 15 | Sept 26 | BC Lions | 7–27 | Edmonton Eskimos | | 44,432 | 11–4–0 | 22 |
| 16 | Oct 5 | Edmonton Eskimos | 20–19 | Montreal Alouettes | | 20,202 | 12–4–0 | 24 |
| 17 | Bye | | | | | | 12–4–0 | 24 |
| 18 | Oct 17 | Winnipeg Blue Bombers | 32–41 | Edmonton Eskimos | | 45,164 | 13–4–0 | 26 |
| 19 | Oct 25 | Edmonton Eskimos | 30–34 | Winnipeg Blue Bombers | | 26,601 | 13–5–0 | 26 |

*Top attendance in CFL

Total attendance: 371,054
Average attendance: 41,228 (68.6%)

== Playoffs ==
| Week | Date | Visitor | Score | Home | OT | Attendance |
| Division Final | Nov 9 | Saskatchewan Roughriders | 23–30 | Edmonton Eskimos | | 40,081 |
| Grey Cup | Nov 16 | Montreal Alouettes | 22–34 | Edmonton Eskimos | | 50,909 |

=== West Final ===
| Team | Q1 | Q2 | Q3 | Q4 | Total |
|---|---|---|---|---|---|
| Saskatchewan Roughriders | 0 | 1 | 1 | 21 | 23 |
| Edmonton Eskimos | 2 | 7 | 14 | 7 | 30 |

=== Grey Cup ===
| Team | Q1 | Q2 | Q3 | Q4 | Total |
|---|---|---|---|---|---|
| Edmonton Eskimos | 7 | 17 | 0 | 10 | 34 |
| Montreal Alouettes | 0 | 21 | 1 | 0 | 22 |

== Roster ==
2003 Edmonton Eskimos final roster
| Quarterbacks: 17 Bart Hendricks; 12 Jason Maas; 15 Ricky Ray; Running backs: 22 Mike Bradley; 33 Troy Mills; 34 Mike Pringle; Receivers: 81 Ed Hervey; 9 Winston October; 86 Scott Robinson; 83 Jason Tucker; 3 Terry Vaughn; 13 Rick Walters | Offensive linemen: 62 Bruce Beaton T; 67 Dan Comiskey G; 59 Leo Groenewegen G/T; 65 Kevin Lefsrud G/C; 60 Chris Morris T; 51 Carlo Panaro G; 53 Tim Prinsen C; Defensive linemen: 90 Rahim Abdullah DE; 91 Dorian Boose DE; 93 Steve Charbonneau DT; 66 Randy Chevrier DT/LS; 97 Kelvin Kinney DE; 95 Albert Reese DT | Linebackers: 99 Sheldon Benoit; 77 A. J. Gass; 45 Olanzo Jarrett; 31 Roger Reinson; 44 Sean Spender; 55 Glen Young; Defensive backs: 26 Donny Brady; 19 Fabian Burke; 25 Quincy Coleman; 4 Darrel Crutchfield; 10 Malcolm Frank; 23 Shannon Garrett; 8 Robert Grant; 27 Singor Mobley | Special teams: 11 Sean Fleming K/P; Injured list: 61 Glenn Carson T; -- Emmanuel Casseus LB; -- Thomas Haskins RB; 6 Quincy Jackson WR; -- Jason Lamar LB; 56 Elfrid Payton DE; 40 Kelvin Powell LB; 80 Brock Ralph WR; 88 Durell Robinson WR; 76 Randy Spencer DT; Italics indicate American player |
