= 2003 Hamilton Tiger-Cats season =

Season of Canadian Football League team the Hamilton Tiger-Cats

- General manager: Ron Lancaster (0–10); Alan Ford Interim (1–7)
- Head coach: Ron Lancaster
- Home stadium: Ivor Wynne Stadium

Results
- Record: 1–17
- Division place: 4th, East
- Playoffs: Did not qualify
- Team MOP: Tim Cheatwood
- Team MOC: Julian Radlein
- Team MOR: Julian Radlein

Uniform

The 2003 Hamilton Tiger-Cats season was the 46th season for the team in the Canadian Football League (CFL) and their 54th overall. The Tiger-Cats finished in fourth place in the East Division with a 1–17 record, which set the record for most regular season losses in professional Canadian football history. With a .059 record, the Tiger-Cats set a CFL record for worst winning percentage (later tied by the 2026 Ottawa Redblacks) and are only second to the 1949 Hamilton Wildcats in Canadian football history who went winless in 1949. They also tied the 1954 and 1961 BC Lions and 1959 Saskatchewan Roughriders for fewest wins in CFL history.

== Offseason ==
=== CFL draft ===
Rd	Pick	Player	Position	School
1	3	Julian Radlein	RB	British Columbia
3	21	Kevin Scott	LB	California PA
4	30	Agustin Barrenechea	LB	Calgary
5	38	David Kasouf	WR	Holy Cross
6	47	Erico-Olivier Hakim	FB	Saint Mary's

== Preseason ==
Week	Date	Opponent	Score	Result	Attendance	Record
B	June 5	at Toronto Argonauts	26–18	Loss	8,201	0–1
C	June 10	Toronto Argonauts	23–5	Loss	20,481	0–2

== Regular season ==
=== Season standings ===
East Division
Pos	Team	Pld	W	L	T	PF	PA	PD	Pts
1	Montreal Alouettes (C, Q)	18	13	5	0	562	409	+153	26
2	Toronto Argonauts (Q)	18	9	9	0	473	433	+40	18
3	Ottawa Renegades (Q)	18	7	11	0	467	581	−114	14
4	Hamilton Tiger-Cats	18	1	17	0	293	583	−290	2

Source: "CFL.ca". Archived from the original on 2009-06-29.
(C) First round bye; (Q) Qualified for playoffs

=== Season schedule ===
Week	Date	Opponent	Score	Result	Attendance	Record
1	June 20	vs. Ottawa Renegades	27–17	Loss	15,318	0–1
2	June 30	at Toronto Argonauts	49–8	Loss	14,842	0–2
3	July 5	vs. Edmonton Eskimos	37–20	Loss	12,492	0–3
4	July 11	vs. Calgary Stampeders	17–11	Loss	15,193	0–4
5	July 16	at Edmonton Eskimos	52–15	Loss	33,785	0–5
6	July 20	at Saskatchewan Roughriders	42–9	Loss	23,510	0–6
7	Bye					
8	Aug 2	vs. Winnipeg Blue Bombers	37–20	Loss	13,809	0–7
9	Aug 8	at Montreal Alouettes	30–17	Loss	20,202	0–8
10	Aug 16	vs. Montreal Alouettes	28–10	Loss	14,169	0–9
11	Aug 22	at BC Lions	47–25	Loss	23,010	0–10
12	Sept 1	vs. Toronto Argonauts	19–11	Loss	21,323	0–11
13	Sept 6	at Ottawa Renegades	45–28	Loss	26,588	0–12
14	Sept 12	vs. Saskatchewan Roughriders	27–24 (OT)	Win	14,313	1–12
14	Sept 16	at Toronto Argonauts	24–14	Loss	15,472	1–13
15	Sept 27	vs. Montreal Alouettes	30–17	Loss	14,048	1–14
16	Oct 3	at Calgary Stampeders	32–12	Loss	32,052	1–15
17	Oct 10	at Winnipeg Blue Bombers	14–9	Loss	25,526	1–16
18	Oct 18	vs. BC Lions	29–23	Loss	13,106	1–17
19	Bye					

== Roster ==
2003 Hamilton Tiger-Cats final roster
Quarterbacks: 8 David Corley; 1 Pete Gonzalez; 14 Danny McManus; Running backs: 32 Troy Davis; 33 Julian Radlein; 34 Jarrett Smith; Receivers: 9 Archie Amerson; 88 Damon Hodge; 83 Chad Plummer; 86 Trevor Shaw; 85 Ray Thomas; 80 Ibrahim Tounkara; 5 Craig Yeast	Offensive linemen: 50 Pascal Cheron G; 51 Carl Coulter C; 68 Dave Hack T; 61 Mike Homewood G; 66 Mike Mihelic G; 62 Chase Raynock T; 54 Mark Verbeek C; Defensive linemen: 49 Tim Cheatwood DE; 92 Karim Grant DE; 91 John Macdonald DT; 53 Joe Montford DE; 91 Joe Rumolo DT; 72 Johnny Scott DT	Linebackers: 28 Chris Bayne; 36 Orlando Bowen; 45 Adam Macdonald; 47 Warren Muzika; 4 Marcus Spencer; 17 Sean Woodson; Defensive backs: 37 Sandy Beveridge; 2 Frantz Clarkson; 22 Steve Fisher; 31 Brandon Hamilton; 42 Rob Hitchcock; 26 Dedric Mathis; 6 Troy Saunders; 21 Kourtney Young	Special teams: 18 Jason Currie P/K; 3 Paul Osbaldiston K/P; Injured list: 81 Tony Akins WR; 53 Lamont Bryant DE; 56 Scott Coe LB; 64 Ryan Donnelly T; 93 Terrell Jurineack DT; 30 Chris Shelling DB; 52 Dave Thomas LB; 7 Kyle Walters DB; Italics indicate American players
