= 2003 Winnipeg Blue Bombers season =

Canadian football team season

- Head coach: Dave Ritchie
- Home stadium: Canad Inns Stadium

Results
- Record: 11–7
- Division place: 2nd, West
- Playoffs: Lost West Semi-Final

Uniform

The 2003 Winnipeg Blue Bombers finished in second place in the West Division with an 11–7 record. They appeared in the West Semi-Final.

== Offseason ==
=== CFL draft ===
Round	Pick	Player	Position	School/club team
3	22	Todd Krenbrink	OL	Regina
4	32	Sebastian Roy	LB	Mount Allison
4	33	Ian Shelswell	DL	Stanford
5	42	Cory Olynick	WR	Regina

== Regular season ==
=== Season standings ===
West Division
Pos	Team	Pld	W	L	T	PF	PA	PD	Pts
1	Edmonton Eskimos (C, Q)	18	13	5	0	569	414	+155	26
2	Winnipeg Blue Bombers (Q)	18	11	7	0	514	487	+27	22
3	Saskatchewan Roughriders (Q)	18	11	7	0	535	430	+105	22
4	BC Lions (Q)	18	11	7	0	531	430	+101	22
5	Calgary Stampeders	18	5	13	0	323	501	−178	10

Source: "CFL.ca". Archived from the original on 2009-06-29.
(C) First round bye; (Q) Qualified for playoffs

=== Season schedule ===
Week	Date	Opponent	Score	Result	Record
1	June 20	at BC Lions	34–27	Win	1–0
2	June 27	at Ottawa Renegades	34–32	Win	2–0
3	July 1	vs. Edmonton Eskimos	14–12	Win	3–0
4	July 10	vs. Saskatchewan Roughriders	29–27	Win	4–0
5	July 15	at Toronto Argonauts	24–14	Loss	4–1
6	July 24	vs. Montreal Alouettes	50–19	Loss	4–2
7	July 29	at Montreal Alouettes	37–27	Loss	4–3
7	Aug 2	at Hamilton Tiger-Cats	37–20	Win	5–3
8	Bye				5–3
9	Aug 12	vs. Ottawa Renegades	34–29	Win	6–3
10	Aug 22	vs. Calgary Stampeders	52–17	Win	7–3
11	Aug 31	at Saskatchewan Roughriders	36–18	Win	8–3
12	Sept 7	vs. Toronto Argonauts	34–30	Win	9–3
13	Sept 14	at Calgary Stampeders	21–19	Loss	9–4
14	Sept 20	vs. BC Lions	26–20	Loss	9–5
15	Bye				9–5
16	Oct 4	at BC Lions	35–31	Loss	9–6
17	Oct 10	vs. Hamilton Tiger-Cats	14–9	Win	10–6
18	Oct 17	at Edmonton Eskimos	41–32	Loss	10–7
19	Oct 25	vs. Edmonton Eskimos	34–30	Win	11–7

== Playoffs ==
=== West Semi-Final ===
Team	Q1	Q2	Q3	Q4	Total
Winnipeg Blue Bombers	0	8	10	3	21
Saskatchewan Roughriders	17	3	0	17	37

== Roster ==
2003 Winnipeg Blue Bombers final roster
Quarterbacks: 8 Stanley Jackson; 17 Khari Jones; 15 Brian Stallworth; Running backs: 29 Kojo Aidoo; 34 Wade Miller; 1 Charles Roberts; 33 Mike Sellers; 30 Brad Yamaoka; Receivers: 80 Geoff Drover; 82 Markus Howell; 87 Reggie Jones; 85 Milt Stegall; 88 Jamie Stoddard	Offensive linemen: 69 Andrew Carter T; 64 Mo Elewonibi C; 62 Dan Gyetvai T; 57 Jermese Jones T; 54 Matt Sheridan G; 67 Eric Wilson G; Defensive linemen: 56 Daved Benefield DE; 97 Doug Brown DT; 90 Denny Fortney DT/DE; 77 Jon Oosterhuis DT; 89 Stephen Young DE; Special teams: 7 Troy Westwood K	Linebackers: 48 Brian Clark; 40 Jason Congdon; 36 Lamar McGriggs; 10 Travis Ortega; 9 Sebastian Roy; 55 Ryland Wickman; Defensive backs: 20 Ricky Bell; 23 Tim Carter; 2 Dave Donaldson; 24 Maurice Kelly; 21 Milo Lewis; 18 Joseph Morgan; 0 Harold Nash; 22 Corey Oaks	Injured list: 14 Pat Barnes QB; 19 Inoke Breckterfield DE; 13 Tom Europe DB; 84 Bob Gordon WR; 65 Scott Harper T; 51 Benedict Ibisi G; 68 Dave Mudge T; 27 Warren Muzika LB; 25 Terry Ray DB; 91 Tyson St. James DE; Suspended: 5 Marvin Coleman DB; Italics indicate International player

== Awards and records ==
=== 2003 CFL All-Stars ===
- RB – Charles Roberts, CFL All-Star
- DE – Daved Benefield, CFL All-Star

=== Western All-Star selections ===
- RB – Charles Roberts, CFL Western All-Star
- DE – Daved Benefield, CFL Western All-Star
