= 91st Grey Cup =

2003 Canadian Football championship game

Edmonton Eskimos	Montreal Alouettes
(13–5)	(13–5)
34	22
Head coach: Tom Higgins	Head coach: Don Matthews
	1	2	3	4	Total
Edmonton Eskimos	7	17	0	10	34
Montreal Alouettes	0	21	1	0	22
- Date: November 16, 2003
- Stadium: Taylor Field
- Location: Regina
- Most Valuable Player: Jason Tucker, WR (Eskimos)
- Most Valuable Canadian: Ben Cahoon, SB (Alouettes)
- National anthem: Ryan Malcolm
- Coin toss: Paul Martin
- Halftime show: Bryan Adams and Sam Roberts
- Attendance: 50,909

Broadcasters
- Network: CBC, RDS
- Announcers: (CBC) Steve Armitage, Chris Cuthbert, Darren Flutie, Greg Frers, Mark Lee, Chris Walby, Brian Williams, Sean Millington
- Ratings: 4.4 million

The 91st Grey Cup was the 2003 Canadian Football League championship game played between the Edmonton Eskimos and the Montreal Alouettes on November 16 at Taylor Field, in Regina, Saskatchewan before 50,909 fans. The two teams had played during the previous year with Montreal winning, but this time the Eskimos won the game by a score of 34–22.

== Game summary ==
Edmonton Eskimos (34) - TDs, Mike Pringle, Jason Tucker (2), Ricky Ray; FGs Sean Fleming (2); cons., Fleming (4).

Montreal Alouettes (22) - TDs, Pat Woodcock, Sylvain Girard, Ben Cahoon; cons. Matt Kellett (3); singles, Kellett (1).

First quarter
EDM—TD Pringle 4 run (Fleming convert) 2:43 7-0 EDM
Second quarter
EDM—TD Tucker 41 pass from Ray (Fleming convert) 2:25 14 - 0 EDM
MTL—TD Woodcock 4 pass from Whitaker (Kellett convert) 9:25 14 - 7 EDM
MTL—TD Girard 32 pass from Calvillo (Kellett convert) 11:45 14 - 14
EDM—TD Tucker 15 pass from Ray (Fleming convert) 13:37 21 - 14 EDM
MTL—TD Cahoon 27 pass from Calvillo (Kellett convert) 14:10 21 - 21
EDM—FG Fleming 27 14:49 24 - 21 EDM
Third quarter
MTL—Single Kellett 70 9:59 24 - 22 EDM
Fourth quarter
EDM—TD Ray 1 run (Fleming convert) 1:28 31 - 22 EDM
EDM—FG Fleming 17 14:31 34 - 22 EDM

Montreal coach Don Matthews surprised many experts by playing rookie cornerbacks D.J. Johnson and Brandon Williams. Williams got the call in place of an injured Omar Evans, while Johnson started in place of Wayne Shaw, because Matthews felt Johnson was better in man-to-man coverage. Even though the inexperience of his young cornerbacks may have cost him the game, Matthews made no apologies for sticking with Williams and Johnson.

After Edmonton running back Mike Pringle opened the scoring with a four-yard TD run on the opening drive, Edmonton took a commanding 14-0 lead in the second quarter when Ray connected with Tucker on a 41-yard touchdown pass, capping a four-play, 70-yard drive.

Ben Cahoon made a spectacular, one-handed catch in tight coverage to put the Alouettes on Edmonton's four-yard line. Montreal called an unusual option play when Anthony Calvillo pitched the ball to running back Deonce Whitaker who tossed a four-yard touchdown to a wide-open Pat Woodcock.

On Edmonton's next possession, Pringle fumbled, and Montreal went straight to work, as Calvillo hit Silvain Girard on a 32-yard TD pass to tie the game. After a Keith Stokes fumble later in the quarter, Ray hooked up with a streaking Tucker with 1:23 left in the quarter on a 20-yard TD passing play, restoring the Eskimos' seven-point advantage.

Montreal struck back on the next drive. Calvillo threw a 27-yard TD to Cahoon with 50 seconds left in the half to tie the score at 21-21, but Edmonton took a 24-21 lead into the intermission when Sean Fleming connected on a 27-yard field goal following another Stokes fumble deep in Montreal's half.

The Eskimo defence took over in the second half, holding Montreal to a single point in the third quarter, while Ray scored early in the fourth quarter on a one-yard run to give the Eskimos a 31-22 lead. The turning point in the game came one play earlier when a Montreal fumble recovery was negated by an offside call on D.J. Johnson, sapping the life out of the Alouettes.

Fleming booted a 27-yard field goal with 29 seconds left to seal the victory for Edmonton.

== Trivia ==
Montreal Coach Don Matthews had previously won five Grey Cup championships.

Pringle eclipsed the record of 359 career yards rushing in Grey Cup games set by Winnipeg legend Leo Lewis.

Jason Tucker, had two touchdowns and seven receptions for 132 yards, winning game MVP honours in the process. Ben Cahoon made six catches for 148 yards and was voted most outstanding Canadian.

This was Edmonton's 12th championship and first since defeating the Winnipeg Blue Bombers in the 1993 Grey Cup final.

Ricky Ray completed 22 of 32 pass attempts for 301 yards. Anthony Calvillo was 22 for 37 for 371 yards.

Edmonton and Montreal have met in 11 Grey Cup clashes. The Alouettes prevailed in 1974, the Ice Bowl of 1977, and 2002. The Eskimos have won in 1954, 1955, 1956, 1975, 1978, 1979, 2003 and 2005.

This is the final Grey Cup game to have been played on the first-generation AstroTurf surface.

== 2003 CFL Playoffs ==
=== West Division ===
- Semi-final (November 2 @ Winnipeg, Manitoba) Saskatchewan Roughriders 37-21 Winnipeg Blue Bombers
- Final (November 9 @ Edmonton, Alberta) Edmonton Eskimos 30-23 Saskatchewan Roughriders

=== East Division ===
- Semi-final (November 5 @ Toronto, Ontario) Toronto Argonauts 28-7 BC Lions*
- Final (November 9 @ Montreal, Quebec) Montreal Alouettes 30-26 Toronto Argonauts

* Cross over from West Division
