= Duane Butler =

American gridiron football player (born 1973)

No. 31
- Positions: Linebacker, safety

Personal information
- Born: November 9, 1973 (age 52); Trotwood, Ohio, U.S.
- Listed height: 6 ft 1 in (1.85 m)
- Listed weight: 211 lb (96 kg)

Career information
- High school: Trotwood (OH) Madison
- College: Illinois State
- NFL draft: 1997: undrafted
- Expansion draft: 1999: 1st round, 18th overall pick

Career history
- New York Jets (1997)*; Minnesota Vikings (1997–1998); England Monarchs (1998); Cleveland Browns (1999)*; Berlin Thunder (2000); Birmingham Thunderbolts (2001); Hamilton Tiger-Cats (2001–2002); Montreal Alouettes (2003–2006)
- * Offseason or practice squad member only
- Stats at Pro Football Reference

Duane Butler (born November 9, 1973) is an American former professional gridiron football linebacker and safety. He played college football at Illinois State.

== College career ==
Duane Butler attended Illinois State University. While there, he was a three time All-Conference selection, and left school with the school's fifth most career tackles record with 332 tackles.

== Professional career ==
Butler began his career as a free agent, eventually playing in the NFL for the Minnesota Vikings, in 1997 for three games and in 1998 for fourteen games. In 1998, he also played for the London Monarchs of the NFL Europa. In 1999, he tried out for the Cleveland Browns. In 2000, he played for the Berlin Thunder of NFL Europa. 2001 was a busy year, as Butler played 15 games with the Hamilton Tiger-Cats of the CFL, and a season with the Birmingham Thunderbolts of the XFL. After another season in Hamilton (2002), Butler found a home with the Montreal Alouettes, where he played for four seasons to 2006. In 2003, he tied the Alouettes records for most sacks in a game, with 5 against the Winnipeg Blue Bombers.
