= Darrel Crutchfield =

American football player (born 1979)

No. 29
- Position: Defensive back

Personal information
- Born: February 26, 1979 (age 47); San Diego, California, U.S
- Listed height: 6 ft 0 in (1.83 m)
- Listed weight: 177 lb (80 kg)

Career information
- High school: William M. Raines (FL)
- College: Clemson

Career history
- Philadelphia Eagles (2001); Edmonton Eskimos (2002–2004); Montreal Alouettes (2005–2006)

Awards and highlights
- Grey Cup champion (2003)

Career statistics
- Total tackles: 2
- Stats at Pro Football Reference

Darrel Crutchfield (born February 26, 1979) is an American former professional football player who was a defensive back in the National Football League (NFL) and Canadian Football League (CFL). He played college football for the Clemson Tigers.

Crutchfield was born in 1979 in San Diego. He attended William M. Raines High School in Jacksonville, Florida.

He attended Clemson University and played for the Tigers from 1997 to 2000.

After college, Crutchfield played professional football in the NFL for the Philadelphia Eagles (NFL). He appeared in four games for the Eagles during the 2001 season.

He also played in the CFL for the Edmonton Eskimos from 2002 to 2004 and the Montreal Alouettes from 2005 to 2006. appeared in 17 games for the 2003 Edmonton Eskimos team that compiled a 13–5 record and won the 91st Grey Cup. He appeared in a total of 59 CFL games. He gained attention in 2005 for his efforts to sell his Grey Cup championship ring.
