= 2003 Ottawa Renegades season =

Canadian football team season

- Head coach: Joe Paopao
- Home stadium: Frank Clair Stadium

Results
- Record: 7–11
- Division place: 3rd, East
- Playoffs: did not qualify

Uniform

The 2003 Ottawa Renegades season was the second season for the team in the Canadian Football League (CFL) and second overall. The Renegades finished the season with an improved 7–11 record, but still failed to make the playoffs.

== Offseason ==
=== CFL draft ===
Round	Pick	Player	Position	School
2	13	Trevor Kine	Tackle	New Mexico State
2	16	Louis Hobson	Defensive line	Stanford
2	17	Israel Idonije	Defensive end	Manitoba
3	19	Patrick Kabongo	Defensive tackle	Nebraska
5	36	Marc Parenteau	Guard	Boston College
6	45	Todd Seely	Linebacker	Ottawa

== Preseason ==
Game	Date	Opponent	Results		Venue	Attendance
Game	Date	Opponent	Score	Record	Venue	Attendance
A	Fri, May 30	vs. Montreal Alouettes	W 21–19	1–0	Frank Clair Stadium	22,802
B	Sat, June 7	at Montreal Alouettes	L 23–54	1–1	PEPS Stadium	10,358

== Regular season ==
=== Season standings ===
East Division
Pos	Team	Pld	W	L	T	PF	PA	PD	Pts
1	Montreal Alouettes (C, Q)	18	13	5	0	562	409	+153	26
2	Toronto Argonauts (Q)	18	9	9	0	473	433	+40	18
3	Ottawa Renegades (Q)	18	7	11	0	467	581	−114	14
4	Hamilton Tiger-Cats	18	1	17	0	293	583	−290	2

Source: "CFL.ca". Archived from the original on 2009-06-29.
(C) First round bye; (Q) Qualified for playoffs

=== Season schedule ===
Week	Game	Date	Opponent	Results		Venue	Attendance
Week	Game	Date	Opponent	Score	Record	Venue	Attendance
1	1	Fri, June 20	at Hamilton Tiger-Cats	W 27–17	1–0	Ivor Wynne Stadium	15,318
2	2	Fri, June 27	vs. Winnipeg Blue Bombers	L 32–34	1–1	Frank Clair Stadium	21,823
3	3	Tue, July 1	at Calgary Stampeders	L 12–32	1–2	McMahon Stadium	32,028
4	4	Thu, July 10	vs. Toronto Argonauts	34–32	2–2	Frank Clair Stadium	22,242
5	5	Fri, July 18	vs. BC Lions	L 14–48	2–3	Frank Clair Stadium	23,800
6	6	Thu, July 24	at BC Lions	L 19–37	2–4	BC Place Stadium	21,554
7	7	Thu, July 31	vs. Edmonton Eskimos	L 26–31	2–5	Frank Clair Stadium	21,200
8	8	Thu, Aug 7	vs. Saskatchewan Roughriders	W 29–24	3–5	Frank Clair Stadium	21,817
9	9	Tue, Aug 12	at Winnipeg Blue Bombers	L 29–34	3–6	Canad Inns Stadium	26,232
9	10	Sun, Aug 17	at Saskatchewan Roughriders	L 41–51	3–7	Taylor Field	26,772
10	Bye						
11	11	Fri, Aug 29	vs. Montreal Alouettes	W 43–38	4–7	Frank Clair Stadium	24,583
12	12	Sat, Sept 6	vs. Hamilton Tiger-Cats	W 45–28	5–7	Frank Clair Stadium	26,588
13	13	Sun, Sept 14	at Montreal Alouettes	L 10–30	5–8	Molson Stadium	20,202
14	14	Fri, Sept 19	at Edmonton Eskimos	L 33–45	5–9	Commonwealth Stadium	35,264
15	15	Fri, Sept 26	vs. Calgary Stampeders	W 26–21	6–9	Frank Clair Stadium	23,212
16	16	Sat, Oct 4	at Toronto Argonauts	L 18–27	6–10	SkyDome	16,431
17	17	Mon, Oct 13	vs. Toronto Argonauts	W 21–15	7–10	Frank Clair Stadium	25,133
18	Bye						
19	18	Sun, Oct 26	at Montreal Alouettes	L 17–27	7–11	Molson Stadium	20,202

== Roster ==
2003 Ottawa Renegades final roster
Quarterbacks: 4 Kerry Joseph; 16 Darnell Kennedy; 14 Romaro Miller; Running backs: 27 Raymonn Adams; 28 Darren Davis; 24 Darren Joseph; 19 Mike Maurer; 30 Josh Ranek; Receivers: 86 Demetris Bendross; 5 Aubrey Cummings; 82 D. J. Flick; 85 Sherrod Gideon; 89 Denis Montana; 80 Yo Murphy	Offensive linemen: 67 Mike Abou-Mechrek G; 55 Chris Burns T; 64 Seth Dittman T; 66 Alexandre Gauthier T; 52 George Hudson C; 57 Val St. Germain G; 63 Mike Sutherland G/C; Defensive linemen: 56 Keaton Cromartie DE; 78 Roger Dunbrack DE; 44 Derrick Ford DE; 99 Jerome Haywood DT; 98 Mike Moten DT; 90 Clinton Wayne DT	Linebackers: 2 Donnavan Carter; 50 Steve Glenn; 7 John Grace; 6 Jason Kralt; 1 Kelly Wiltshire; Defensive backs: 32 Crance Clemons; 22 Shawn Gallant; 33 David Mitchell; 20 Jonathan Ordway; 3 Donnie Ruiz; 23 Serge Sejour; 39 Gerald Vaughn; Special teams: 28 Pat Fleming P; 10 Lawrence Tynes K	Injured list: 21 Greg Bearman DB; 92 Michael Boireau DE; 53 David De La Perralle T; 34 Tim Fleiszer DE; 81 Andre Kirwan WR; 13 Eric Lee DB; 29 George McCullough DB; 41 Fred Perry LB; 83 Darryl Ray SB; 38 Mark Robichaud LB; 8 Grayson Shillingford SB; 35 Mike Vilimek FB; Suspended: 97 Pene Talamaivao DT; Italics indicate American player
