= Clifford Ivory =

American gridiron football player and coach (born 1975)

No. 13
- Position: Cornerback

Personal information
- Born: August 1, 1975 (age 51); Quitman, Georgia, U.S.
- Listed height: 6 ft 0 in (1.83 m)
- Listed weight: 240 lb (109 kg)

Career information
- College: Troy State
- NFL draft: 1998: 6th round, 155th overall pick

Career history

Playing
- San Diego Chargers (1998); → Scottish Claymores (1999); Hamilton Tiger-Cats (2000–2001); Toronto Argonauts (2002–2006)

Coaching
- York (DC, 2007)

Awards and highlights
- Grey Cup champion: 2004; 3× CFL All-Star (2002, 2003, 2004)
- Stats at CFL.ca (archive)

Clifford Ivory (born August 1, 1975) is an American former professional football cornerback who played in the Canadian Football League (CFL) for the Hamilton Tiger-Cats and the Toronto Argonauts. He once shared the Argonauts' record for most interceptions returned for touchdowns with five along with Ed Berry and Adrion Smith, before Byron Parker broke the record with his sixth interception return for a touchdown in 2007. He was drafted in the sixth round of the 1998 NFL Draft with the 155th overall pick.
