= Ron Ockimey =

American entrepreneur and former football player

No. 30, 31, 15
- Position: Linebacker

Personal information
- Born: September 3, 1978 (age 48); Philadelphia, Pennsylvania, U.S.
- Listed height: 6 ft 2 in (1.88 m)
- Listed weight: 215 lb (98 kg)

Career information
- College: San Jose State

Career history
- San Francisco 49ers (2001)*; BC Lions (2002–2003); Winnipeg Blue Bombers (2005–2006)
- * Offseason or practice squad member only

Ronald Brandon Ockimey (born September 3, 1978) is an American entrepreneur and former professional football player who played in the Canadian Football League (CFL) and was signed as an undrafted free agent by the San Francisco 49ers.

== Early life and education ==
Ockimey was born in Philadelphia, Pennsylvania. He attended San Bernardino Valley College from 1997 to 1999, where he earned an Associate of Science degree in General Studies. He then transferred to San José State University, where he played college football as a linebacker from 1999 to 2001 while studying Radio, Television, and Digital Communication He later pursued a second Associate of Science degree in Fire Protection Technology at Mission College from 2009 to 2010.

== Football career ==
=== College ===
Ockimey played linebacker for the San José State Spartans from 1999 to 2001. Standing 6'2" and weighing 213 pounds, he competed in several Pac-10 matchups during his college career.

=== Professional ===
==== National Football League ====
Following the 2001 NFL Draft, Ockimey signed with the San Francisco 49ers as an undrafted free agent. He was listed on the team's summer transaction roster.

==== Canadian Football League ====
Ockimey played four seasons in the CFL:

- BC Lions (2002–2003)
- Winnipeg Blue Bombers (2005–2006)

According to available records, he appeared in 50 CFL games during his career.

== Business career ==
After retiring from professional football, Ockimey transitioned into entrepreneurship, focusing primarily on the cannabis industry.

=== Cannabis industry ventures ===
In 2015, Ockimey founded Kingston Royal, LLC, a cannabis product manufacturer.

From 2018 to 2020, he served as Chief of Staff at NatureTrak, a compliance software company serving financial institutions in the cannabis sector.

In 2020, he founded Locals Equity Distribution, a licensed California distribution company focused on supporting social equity cannabis brands.

In 2022, he established Streetcred Packaging Company, which provides packaging solutions for the cannabis and consumer product industries.

== Media appearances ==
In 2019, Ockimey was featured on Episode 009 of the Dankonomy Podcast, where he discussed his role in cannabis compliance technology and his athletic background.

In March 2023, Cannabis Now magazine featured Ockimey in a profile titled "The Color of Money," which detailed his efforts to support social equity cannabis brands and his work in cannabis banking compliance.
