= Thomas Haskins =

American gridiron football player (born 1973)

No. 4
- Position: Running back

Personal information
- Born: August 11, 1973 (age 53); Richmond, Virginia, U.S.
- Listed height: 5 ft 8 in (1.73 m)
- Listed weight: 175 lb (79 kg)

Career information
- College: VMI
- NFL draft: 1997: undrafted

Career history
- Montreal Alouettes (1997–2002); Edmonton Eskimos (2003)*
- * Offseason or practice squad member only

Awards and highlights
- Grey Cup champion (2002)

Thomas Allen Haskins Jr. (born August 11, 1973) is an American former professional football running back who played for the Montreal Alouettes of the Canadian Football League (CFL).

== College career ==
Haskins played for Virginia Military Institute for three seasons. There, he finished his collegiate career holding 21 school records, co-holding 5 school records. In addition to scoring 50 all-time touchdowns, he set the all-time rushing record for Division I-AA with 5349 yards. As of 2002, this ranks him third all-time in Division I-AA. As of 2008, Haskins is the only VMI football player to have his jersey number retired. He is also set to be inducted into the VMI Sports Hall of Fame in November 2008.

== Professional career ==
In 1997, Haskins joined the Montreal Alouettes of the CFL and played there for the next six seasons, winning a Grey Cup championship in his final year with the team. On February 22, 2003, Haskins signed a free-agent contract with the Edmonton Eskimos. However, a month later, Haskins suffered from a benign brain tumor the size of an orange which was removed. As a result, Haskins did not suit up for a single game for the Eskimos. Despite that, the Eskimos honoured his contract for the 2003 season. In March 2004, Haskins was released by the Eskimos. Despite vowing to return to professional football after recovering from the tumor, Haskins decided to retire.
