= Anthony Calvillo =

Canadian-American football player and coach

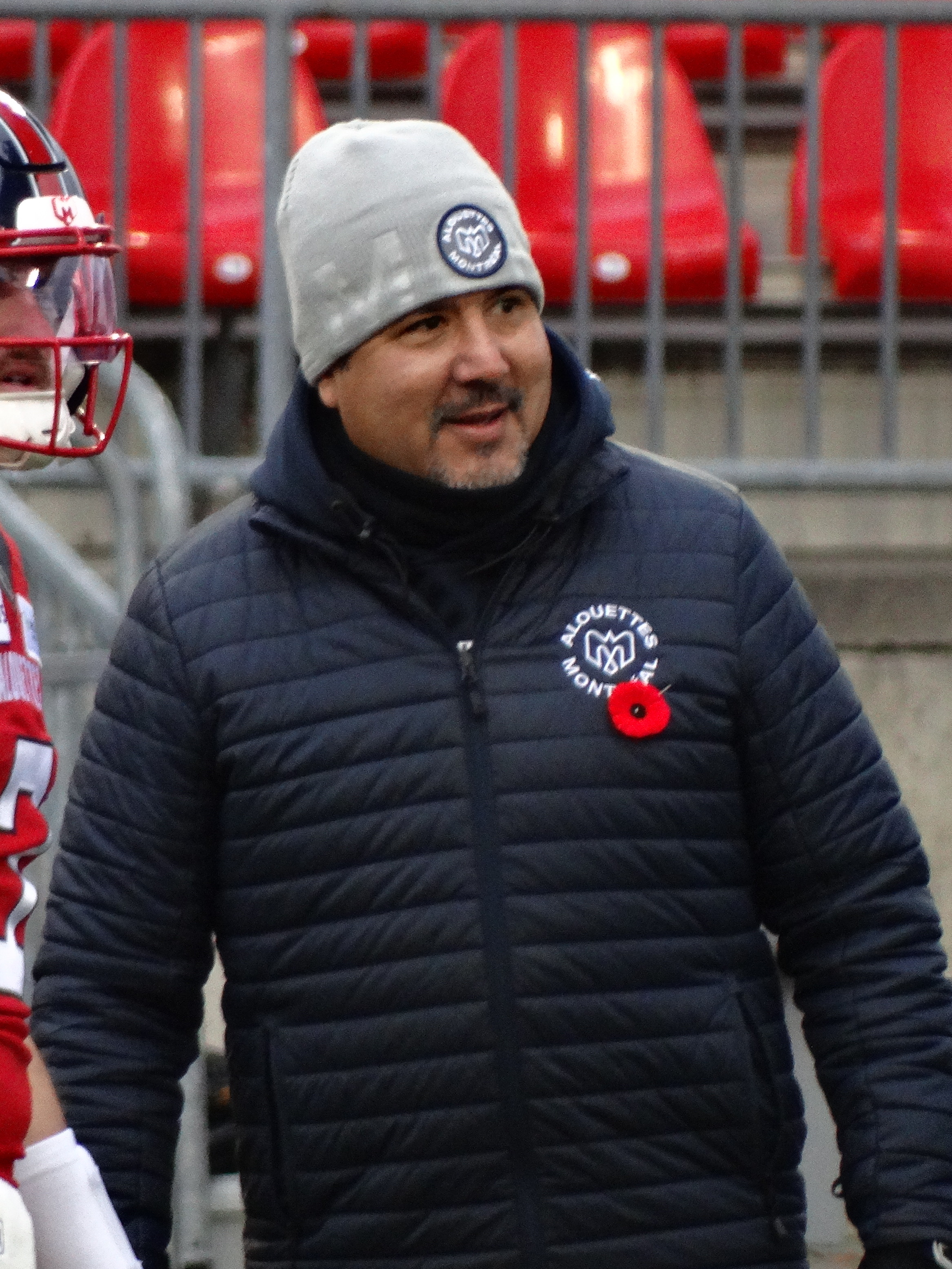
- Calvillo with the Montreal Alouettes in 2023

Montreal Alouettes
- Title: Offensive coordinator, quarterbacks coach

Personal information
- Born: August 23, 1972 (age 54); Los Angeles, California, U.S.
- Listed height: 6 ft 1 in (1.85 m)
- Listed weight: 213 lb (97 kg)

Career information
- Position: Quarterback (No. 13)
- High school: La Puente (La Puente, California)
- College: Utah State
- NFL draft: 1994: undrafted

Career history

Playing
- Las Vegas Posse (1994); Hamilton Tiger-Cats (1995–1997); Montreal Alouettes (1998–2013)

Coaching
- Montreal Alouettes –Receivers coach (2015) –Offensive coordinator (2015–2016) –Quarterbacks coach (2016–2017); Toronto Argonauts (2018) –Quarterbacks coach; Montreal Carabins –Assistant head coach (2019) –Offensive coordinator (2021) –Quarterbacks coach (2021); Montreal Alouettes –Quarterbacks coach (2022–present) –Offensive coordinator (2023–present)

Awards and highlights
- 4× Grey Cup champion (2002, 2009, 2010, 2023); Grey Cup MVP (2002); 3× Most Outstanding Player (2003, 2008, 2009); 7× Terry Evanshen Trophy (2002–2004, 2008–2011); 5× CFL All-Star (2002, 2003, 2008, 2009, 2012); 10× CFL East All-Star (2000, 2002–2004, 2006, 2008–2012); 4× CFLPA Pro Player All Star Team (2002, 2003, 2008, 2010); 4× CFL passing yards leader (2003–2005, 2011); 5× CFL passing touchdowns leader (2003, 2005, 2008, 2009, 2011); Second-team All-Big West (1993); Montreal Alouettes No. 13 retired; CFL records: Most career passing yards (79,816); Most career touchdown passes (455); Most career pass completions (5,892); Most career pass attempts (9,437); Most career passing yards in Grey Cup games (2,470 yards)
- Stats at CFL.ca (archive)
- Canadian Football Hall of Fame (Class of 2017)

Anthony Calvillo (born August 23, 1972) is an American professional football coach and former quarterback who is currently the offensive coordinator and quarterbacks coach for the Montreal Alouettes of the Canadian Football League (CFL). He was professional football's all-time passing yards leader from 2011 to 2020, and is first in all-time CFL passing yards. In his career, he passed for 79,816 yards and is one of ten professional quarterbacks to have completed over 400 touchdown passes (the others being Brett Favre, Warren Moon, Peyton Manning, Dan Marino, Tom Brady, Drew Brees, Philip Rivers, Aaron Rodgers, and Ben Roethlisberger). His passing-yards reign ended in 2020 when Brees surpassed his record.

Calvillo won three Grey Cup championships in 2002, 2009, and 2010, and named Grey Cup Most Valuable Player in 2002. He also won the CFL's Most Outstanding Player Award three times, in 2003, 2008, and 2009, which ties him for second all-time behind Doug Flutie. Calvillo announced his retirement on January 21, 2014. Calvillo was an assistant coach for the Alouettes from 2015 to 2017 and with the Toronto Argonauts in 2018.

== Early life ==
Calvillo was born in Los Angeles, California. While attending La Puente High School, he was a two-sport standout in football and basketball. He is of Mexican-American descent. Calvillo grew up with an alcoholic and abusive father; sports were his escape from his turbulent childhood.

== College career ==
Calvillo spent two seasons at Mt. San Antonio College before transferring to Utah State University in 1992. After a solid junior year as starting quarterback, he had a terrific senior season in 1993. He set a school record with 3,260 yards of total offense in the regular season, and he also set a school record with five touchdown passes in a single game (he did it twice). With Calvillo leading the offense, USU won the Big West Conference championship for the first time since 1979. The Aggies finished the year with a 42–33 win over Ball State in the Las Vegas Bowl; Calvillo passed for 386 yards and three touchdowns to win MVP honors. It was Utah State's first-ever bowl victory.

== Professional career ==
=== Las Vegas Posse ===
After not being drafted by an NFL team, Calvillo started his Canadian Football League career in 1994 with the US expansion Las Vegas Posse.

=== Hamilton Tiger-Cats ===
After the Posse folded a year later in the CFL U.S. expansion experiment, Calvillo was selected first overall by the Hamilton Tiger-Cats in the dispersal draft. While in Hamilton, Calvillo served as a backup quarterback to players such as Steve Taylor and Matt Dunigan.

In 1996, Calvillo threw for 518 yards against the Saskatchewan Roughriders on October 6. This was a Hamilton single-game record. On October 25 against the Montreal Alouettes, he threw for 542 yards, which was the highest passing yardage total in the CFL that year, and rewrote the Hamilton single-game record.

=== Montreal Alouettes ===
In 1998, Calvillo signed as a free agent with the Montreal Alouettes, where he became one of the most outstanding quarterbacks in history. He led the Alouettes to the 2002 Grey Cup, their first in 25 years, where he was named the most valuable player in the game.

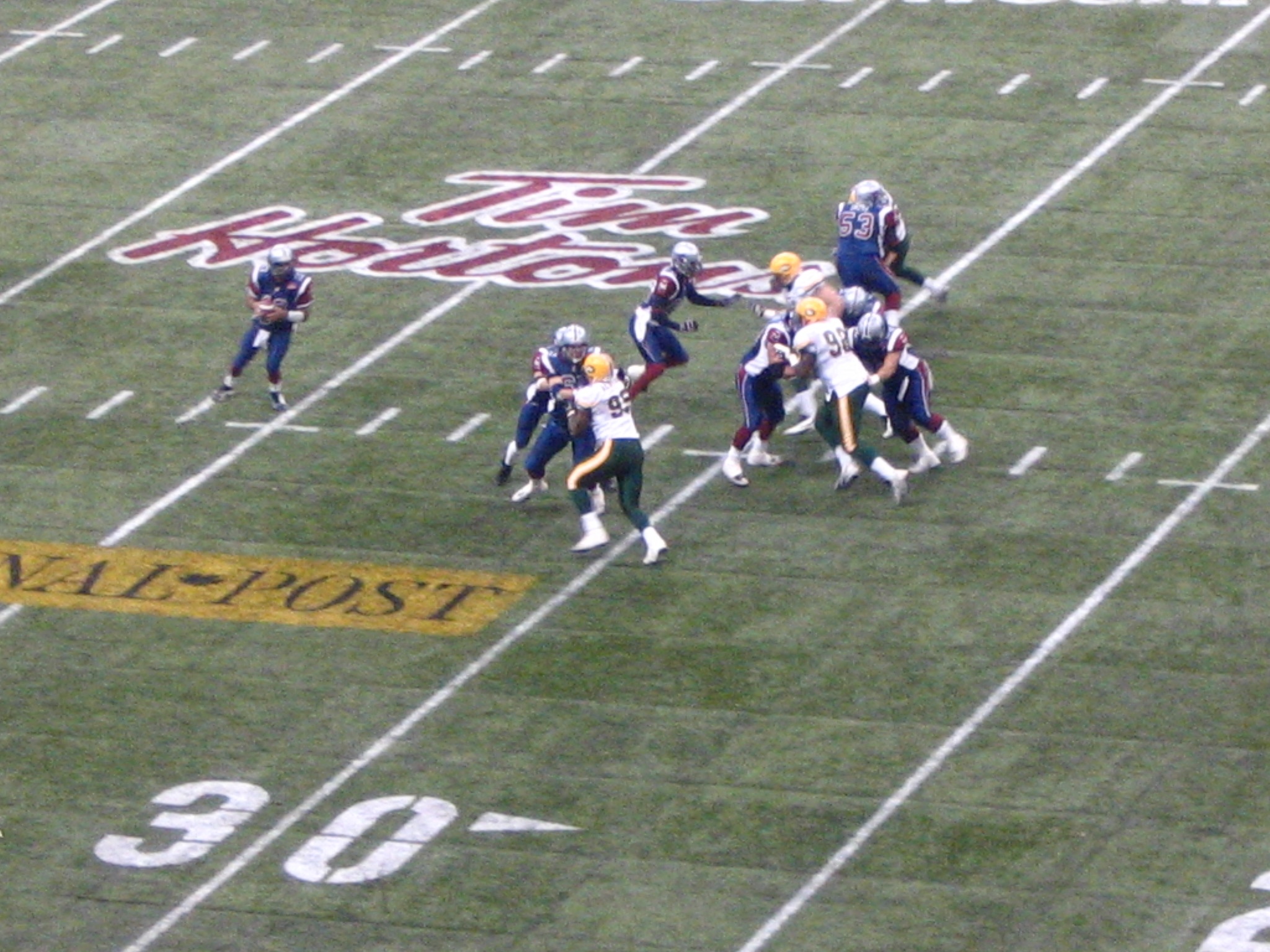
Anthony Calvillo game action, 93rd Grey Cup

During the 2003 CFL season, Calvillo broke numerous Montreal Alouette passing records, completing 408 of 675 passing attempts for 5,891 yards and 37 touchdowns. In 2004, with 6,041 passing yards, Calvillo became the fourth quarterback in CFL history to pass for more than 6,000 yards in a single season (Doug Flutie, David Archer, and Kent Austin being the other three), earning him the East Division nomination for Most Outstanding Player for the third consecutive year. With Calvillo quarterbacking the Alouettes' offence, the 2004 Alouettes became the first team in CFL history to have four players with over 1,000 yards receiving in the same season: Ben Cahoon (1183 yards), Jeremaine Copeland (1154 yards), Thyron Anderson (1147 yards), and Kwame Cavil (1090 yards). In 2005, Calvillo and the Alouettes repeated the feat of four receivers over 1,000 yards: Kerry Watkins (1364 yards), Terry Vaughn (1113 yards), Ben Cahoon (1067 yards), and Dave Stala (1037 yards).

The 2008 CFL season saw Calvillo hit a number of career milestones. On June 26, in a game against the Hamilton Tiger-Cats, Calvillo surpassed Danny McManus to become the second-all-time leading passer in the CFL. On July 31, in another game against the Hamilton Tiger-Cats, Calvillo became the fourth quarterback in league history to reach 300 career touchdown passes. On August 15, 2008, in a game against the Toronto Argonauts, Calvillo became the second quarterback in CFL history after Damon Allen to reach 4,000 career pass completions. With 5,633 passing yards and 43 touchdown passes, Calvillo won the 2008 Most Outstanding Player award. Calvillo led the Montreal Alouettes to the 2008 Grey Cup final, which the Alouettes lost 22–14 to the Calgary Stampeders.

In 2009, Calvillo added to his club records while reaching more CFL milestones. On July 23, 2009, he surpassed Canadian Football Hall of Famer Ron Lancaster's 334 career touchdown passes to move into second place all time. He sat out two games during the regular season, but still accumulated 4639 yards while posting a remarkable 72.0% completion rate, the second best single-season completion rate in CFL history behind Dave Dickenson's 73.98% mark set in 2005. Calvillo led Montreal to a 16-point fourth quarter comeback victory in the 97th Grey Cup on Nov. 29, when the Alouettes defeated the Saskatchewan Roughriders 28–27 on a last-second field goal known as the "13th Man" finish.

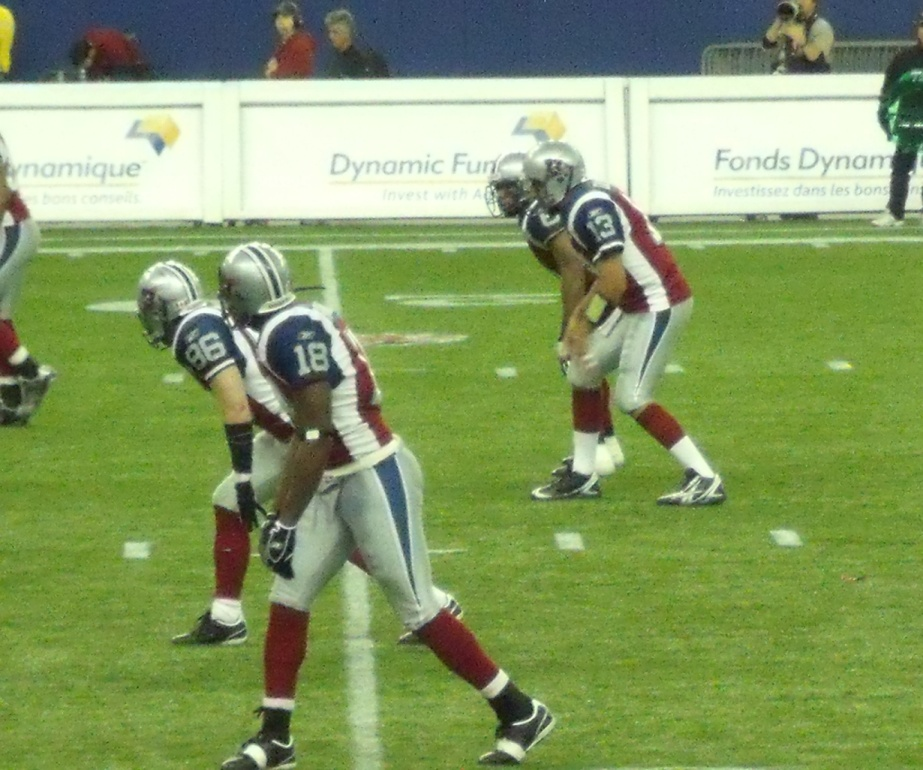
Calvillo (13) in the 96th Grey Cup.

Calvillo won his third Grey Cup on November 28, 2010, at 98th Grey Cup in Edmonton, Alberta where he defeated the Saskatchewan Roughriders 21-18 for the second year in a row. He added to his record total of passing yards in Grey Cup games with 2470 yards, as well as setting the record for Grey Cup starts with eight. As of the 2010 CFL season, Calvillo is 3–5 in Grey Cup Championship Games.

In a post-game interview, he revealed that he would be undergoing off-season surgery to remove a lesion on his thyroid that was discovered after he injured his sternum during the season. On December 21, 2010, it was reported that Calvillo had successful thyroidectomy surgery to remove a cancerous lesion.

On July 15, 2011, in a game against the Toronto Argonauts, Calvillo completed his CFL record 395th career touchdown pass to Éric Deslauriers. On August 4 of that same season, and again against the Argonauts, Calvillo completed his 5159th pass completion to Brandon London to move past Damon Allen to become the leader in that category as well. Then, on October 10, 2011, Calvillo completed a touchdown pass to Jamel Richardson to become professional football's all-time leading passer, in the Alouettes' third and final game against the Toronto Argonauts that year. In 2012, Calvillo became the only player in football history to pass 5,000 yards seven times in his career. He reached 4,000 yards passing eleven times in his career (a CFL record); only Peyton Manning of the NFL has reached the 4,000 mark more times in his career with fourteen 4,000 yard seasons. He also set another CFL record having 8 consecutive 300+ passing yards games in a single season, breaking the record he shared with Doug Flutie. In honour of the 100th Grey Cup, Canada Post used his image on a series of commemorative postage stamps. The image was also used on presentation posters and other materials to promote the Grey Cup game and other celebrations associated with the centennial.

Calvillo signed a two-year contract on December 13, 2012, with the deal keeping him with the Als through the 2014 season. In Week 8 of the 2013 CFL season, Calvillo left the game after taking a hit from Saskatchewan's Ricky Foley. Three days after the game, it was announced that he had suffered a concussion, and missed the Week 9 game against the BC Lions and the Week 10 game against the Toronto Argonauts. On September 4, 2013, the Als placed Calvillo on the 9-game injury list. On October 18, 2013, the Montreal Alouettes general manager and head coach Jim Popp announced that Calvillo would not be returning to play for the remainder of the 2013 season.

On January 21, 2014, Calvillo announced his retirement from professional football. Before his retirement, he was offered the offensive coordinator position with the Alouettes but declined. On October 13, 2014, Calvillo's jersey number, #13, was retired in a halftime ceremony at McGill Stadium. Upon his retirement, he was the last active player that played for an American-based CFL team during its expansion to the US in the mid-1990s. Calvillo was inducted into the Canadian Football Hall of Fame in 2017.

== Coaching career ==
=== Montreal Alouettes (first stint) ===
On December 15, 2014, the Montreal Alouettes announced that Calvillo would be joining the team as an offensive coach in 2015. On January 29, 2015, Calvillo was appointed as the receivers coach. After the firing of Alouettes head coach Tom Higgins, Calvillo was named the quarterbacks coach for the Alouettes on August 22, 2015. After a few weeks, the team's offensive coordinator, Turk Schonert, was fired and Calvillo was named co-offensive coordinator along with Ryan Dinwiddie. Going into the 2016 season, Calvillo was named offensive coordinator with Jacques Chapdelaine as his special advisor as he grew into the role. After head coach Jim Popp resigned and Chapdelaine was promoted to that position, Chapdelaine also took over play-calling duties from Calvillo. For the 2017 season, Calvillo was announced as the quarterbacks coach.

=== Toronto Argonauts ===
On March 19, 2018, the Argos announced the hiring of Calvillo as their quarterback coach. The hire reunited Calvillo with his former general manager Jim Popp, and head coach Marc Trestman.

=== Montreal Carabins ===
On December 19, 2018, Calvillo was named as the assistant head coach for the Montreal Carabins football team in U Sports. The move reunited Calvillo with Danny Maciocia, who was an offensive coach with the Alouettes from 1996 to 2001. He was promoted to offensive coordinator and quarterbacks coach and served in that capacity for the 2021 U Sports football season.

=== Montreal Alouettes (second stint) ===
On January 6, 2022, it was announced that Calvillo had re-joined the Alouettes' coaching staff as the team's quarterbacks coach. In early December 2022 it was reported that Calvillo was one of five finalists for the vacant Alouettes head coaching job. In 2023, Calvillo was the Offensive Coordinator and Quarterbacks Coach, winning his first Grey Cup as a coach.

== Career statistics ==
=== CFL ===
==== Regular season ====
		Passing									Rushing
Year	Team	GP	GS	Att	Cmp	Pct	Yds	TD	Int	Rtg	Att	Yds	Avg	Lng	TD	Fum
1994	LV	17	14	348	154	44.3	2,582	13	15	64.4	42	195	4.6	21	2	9
1995	HAM	18	9	385	211	54.8	2,831	19	21	72.1	24	51	2.1	13	2	5
1996	HAM	13	7	265	157	59.2	2,571	13	13	87.8	40	311	7.8	53	1	2
1997	HAM	12	10	278	160	57.6	2,177	12	11	80.6	53	242	4.6	29	2	12
1998	MTL	18	5	172	98	57.0	1,526	6	10	74.0	31	121	3.9	11	1	1
1999	MTL	18	9	249	166	66.7	2,592	13	6	108.4	56	211	3.8	27	3	3
2000	MTL	18	17	435	272	62.5	4,277	27	5	111.1	58	230	4.0	26	2	6
2001	MTL	18	15	412	250	60.7	3,671	16	9	93.6	40	253	6.3	29	1	2
2002	MTL	18	17	569	338	59.4	5,013	27	10	96.8	45	327	7.3	24	3	5
2003	MTL	18	18	675	408	60.4	5,891	37	14	98.4	45	169	3.8	46	1	12
2004	MTL	18	18	690	431	62.5	6,041	31	15	96.6	44	237	5.4	18	1	2
2005	MTL	18	17	661	437	66.1	5,556	34	19	97.4	35	189	5.4	15	6	4
2006	MTL	18	18	640	402	62.8	4,714	20	15	85.8	28	185	6.6	21	2	3
2007	MTL	13	13	459	308	67.1	3,608	17	8	95.8	21	137	6.5	17	0	3
2008	MTL	17	17	682	472	69.2	5,633	43	13	107.2	26	189	7.3	29	2	1
2009	MTL	18	16	550	396	72.0	4,639	26	6	108.4	32	198	6.2	30	2	3
2010	MTL	16	15	562	380	67.6	4,839	32	7	108.1	16	107	6.7	16	0	6
2011	MTL	18	18	654	404	61.8	5,251	32	8	98.2	21	155	7.4	20	1	9
2012	MTL	18	17	555	333	60.0	5,082	31	14	98.3	19	155	8.2	22	2	3
2013	MTL	7	7	196	115	58.7	1,322	6	5	78.7	6	26	4.3	9	0	2
CFL totals		329	277	9,437	5,892	62.4	79,816	455	224	95.5	682	3,688	5.4	53	34	93

==== Playoffs ====
Year & game	Team	GP	GS	ATT	COMP	YD	TD	INT	RUSH	YD	TD
1995 North Semi-Final	HAM	1	0	0	-	-	-	-	0	-	-
1996 East Semi-Final	HAM	1	1	37	20	234	1	4	6	22	0
1998 East Semi-Final	MTL	1	0	1	0	0	0	0	0	-	-
1998 East Final	MTL	1	0	0	-	-	-	-	0	-	-
1999 East Final	MTL	1	0	7	3	12	0	0	0	-	-
2000 East Final	MTL	1	1	21	8	165	1	1	2	6	0
2001 East Semi-Final	MTL	1	1	38	18	229	1	1	4	50	0
2002 East Final	MTL	1	1	26	17	142	0	0	6	28	0
2003 East Final	MTL	1	1	35	25	228	2	1	4	40	1
2004 East Final	MTL	1	1	23	16	176	0	0	2	1	0
2005 East Semi-Final	MTL	1	1	31	22	314	3	0	1	10	0
2005 East Final	MTL	1	1	33	19	190	0	0	3	22	0
2006 East Final	MTL	1	1	22	14	252	1	1	4	23	0
2007 East Semi-Final	MTL	0	-	-	-	-	-	-	-	-	-
2008 East Final	MTL	1	1	32	20	295	1	0	3	29	0
2009 East Final	MTL	1	1	28	19	312	5	1	3	24	0
2010 East Final	MTL	1	1	26	19	334	2	1	3	16	0
2011 East Semi-Final	MTL	1	1	42	30	513	3	1	2	12	0
2012 East Final	MTL	1	1	34	20	303	0	2	1	0	0
2013 East Semi-Final	MTL	0	-	-	-	-	-	-	-	-	-
Totals		18	14	436	270	3699	20	13	44	283	1

==== Grey Cup ====
Year	Team	GP	GS	ATT	COMP	YD	TD	INT	RUSH	YD	TD
2000	MTL	1	1	26	13	242	2	2	4	16	0
2002	MTL	1	1	31	11	260	2	0	1	12	0
2003	MTL	1	1	38	22	371	2	0	1	4	0
2005	MTL	1	1	43	29	361	1	1	4	21	1
2006	MTL	1	1	41	20	234	0	0	2	12	0
2008	MTL	1	1	38	29	352	0	2	0	-	-
2009	MTL	1	1	39	26	314	2	0	4	23	0
2010	MTL	1	1	42	29	336	0	0	2	16	0
Totals		8	8	298	179	2,470	9	5	18	104	1

=== College ===
Utah State Aggies
Season	Passing					Rushing		
Season	Cmp	Att	Yds	TD	Int	Att	Yds	TD
1992	201	360	2,494	16	9	65	84	4
1993	247	469	3,148	19	10	89	112	4
Career	448	829	5,642	35	19	154	196	8

== Career highlights ==
=== Awards and honors ===
As player

- 3× Grey Cup champion (2002, 2009, 2010)
- Grey Cup MVP (2002)
- 3× Most Outstanding Player (2003, 2008, 2009)
- 7× Terry Evanshen Trophy (2002–2004, 2008–2011)
- 5× CFL All-Star (2002, 2003, 2008, 2009, 2012)
- 10× CFL East All-Star (2000, 2002–2004, 2006, 2008–2012)
- 4× CFLPA Pro Player All Star Team (2002, 2003, 2008, 2010)
- 4× CFL passing yards leader (2003–2005, 2011)
- 5× CFL passing touchdowns leader (2003, 2005, 2008, 2009, 2011)
- Fans' Choice Award (2004)
- Montreal Alouettes No. 13 retired
- Canadian Football Hall of Fame (2017)
- Second-team All-Big West Conference (1993)

As coach

- Grey Cup champion (2023)

=== Records ===
CFL records

- Most career passing yards (79,816)
- Most career touchdown passes (455)
- Most career pass completions (5,892)
- Most career pass attempts (9,437)
- Most career passing yards in Grey Cup games (2,470 yards)

Pro football records

- Pro football's all-time leader in passing yards (79,816, since broken)

== Personal life ==
Calvillo and his wife Alexia have two daughters and reside year-round in Montreal, Quebec. Calvillo became a Canadian citizen on November 19, 2021.

== See also ==
- List of gridiron football quarterbacks passing statistics

Awards and achievements
Preceded by Damon Allen	Most career touchdown passes (CFL); 2011	Succeeded by Current record holder
