= 2003 Toronto Argonauts season =

CFL team season

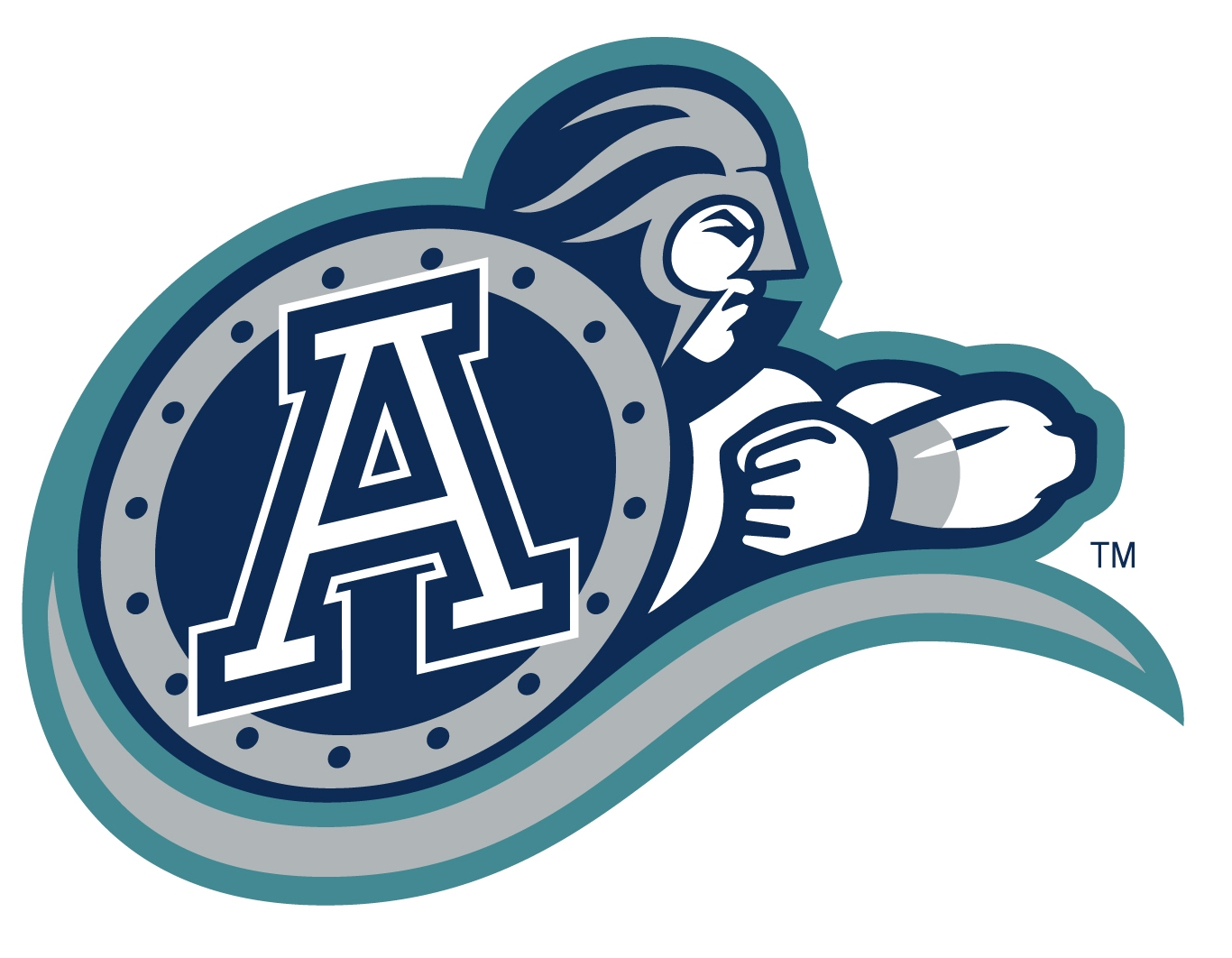
- General manager: Michael "Pinball" Clemons
- Head coach: Michael "Pinball" Clemons
- Home stadium: SkyDome

Results
- Record: 9–9
- Division place: 2nd, East
- Playoffs: Lost East Final

Uniform

The 2003 Toronto Argonauts finished in second place in the East Division of the 2003 CFL season with a 9–9 record. They won the East Semi-Final but lost the East Final.

== Offseason ==
=== CFL draft ===
Rd	Pick	Player	Position	School
4	28	Ray Mariuz	LB	McMaster
5	39	Derik Fury	LB	Mount Allison
6	48	Michael Palmer	WR	Guelph

=== Preseason ===
Week	Date	Opponent	Location	Final score	Attendance	Record
A	Bye					
B	June 5	Tiger-Cats	SkyDome	W 26 – 18	8,201	1–0
C	June 10	@ Tiger-Cats	Ivor Wynne Stadium	W 23 – 5	20,481	2–0

== Regular season ==
=== Season standings ===
East Division
Pos	Team	Pld	W	L	T	PF	PA	PD	Pts
1	Montreal Alouettes (C, Q)	18	13	5	0	562	409	+153	26
2	Toronto Argonauts (Q)	18	9	9	0	473	433	+40	18
3	Ottawa Renegades (Q)	18	7	11	0	467	581	−114	14
4	Hamilton Tiger-Cats	18	1	17	0	293	583	−290	2

Source: "CFL.ca". Archived from the original on 2009-06-29.
(C) First round bye; (Q) Qualified for playoffs

=== Regular season ===
Week	Date	Opponent	Location	Final score	Attendance	Record
1	June 19	Roughriders	SkyDome	L 20 – 18	15,126	0–1
2	June 30	Tiger-Cats	SkyDome	W 49 – 8	14,842	1–1
3	July 3	@ Lions	BC Place Stadium	L 30 – 27 (OT)	20,131	1–2
4	July 10	@ Renegades	Frank Clair Stadium	L 34 – 32	22,242	1–3
5	July 15	Blue Bombers	SkyDome	W 24 – 14	14,089	2–3
6	July 26	@ Stampeders	McMahon Stadium	W 41 – 24	30,976	3–3
7	August 1	Lions	SkyDome	W 28 – 26 (2OT)	15,623	4–3
8	August 9	@ Eskimos	Commonwealth Stadium	L 49 – 20	44,205	4–4
9	August 17 †	Eskimos	SkyDome	L 18 – 15	11,021	4–5
10	August 21	@ Alouettes	Molson Stadium	L 46 – 22	20,202	4–6
11	September 1	@ Tiger-Cats	Ivor Wynne Stadium	W 19 – 11	21,323	5–6
12	September 7	@ Blue Bombers	Canad Inns Stadium	L 34 – 30	26,468	5–7
13	Bye					
14	September 16	Tiger-Cats	SkyDome	W 24 – 14	15,472	6–7
15	September 28	@ Roughriders	Taylor Field	L 41 – 24	30,249	6–8
16	October 4	Renegades	SkyDome	W 27 – 18	16,431	7–8
17	October 13	@ Renegades	Frank Clair Stadium	L 21 – 15	25,133	7–9
18	October 17	Alouettes	SkyDome	W 45 – 13	14,921	8–9
19	October 24	Stampeders	SkyDome	W 13 – 12	18,223	9–9

- † Game rescheduled from August 14 due to the Northeast blackout of 2003.

== Postseason ==
Round	Date	Opponent	Location	Final score	Attendance
East Semi-Final	November 2	Lions	SkyDome	W 28–7	21,029
East Final	November 9	@ Alouettes	Olympic Stadium	L 30–26	60,007

== Roster ==
2003 Toronto Argonauts final roster
Quarterbacks: 9 Damon Allen; 7 Michael Bishop; 3 Marcus Brady; Running backs: 34 Randy Bowles; 27 Mike Jenkins; 33 Jeff Johnson; Receivers: 5 Alfred Jackson; 83 Lal Knight; 23 Bashir Levingston; 15 Tony Miles; 87 Derrell Mitchell; 18 Mike Morreale; 77 Michael Palmer	Offensive linemen: 65 Sandy Annunziata G; 67 John Feugill T; 56 Chad Folk C; 52 Danny Frame G; 64 Shawn Gifford T; 66 Jude St. John G; 69 Bernard Williams T; Defensive linemen: 92 Noah Cantor DT; 95 Eric England DT; 98 Marvin Thomas DE; 90 Chuck Walsh DE/DT; 99 Wayne Weathers DE; Special teams: 1 Noel Prefontaine K/P	Linebackers: 35 Kevin Eiben; 2 Michael Fletcher; 36 Ray Mariuz; 50 Mike O'Shea; 45 Randy Srochenski; Defensive backs: 24 Raphaol Ball; 10 Antonious Bonner; 6 Mike Crumb; 8 Chris Hardy; 13 Clifford Ivory; 12 Adrion Smith; 21 Orlondo Steinauer; 30 Kenny Wheaton; 32 Chuck Winters	Injured list: 63 Corey Annett C/G; 29 Jason Horton DB; Suspended: 18 Yohance Scott DB; Italics indicate International player

== Awards and records ==
=== 2003 CFL All-Stars ===
- WR – Tony Miles
- DT – Eric England
- CB – Adrion Smith
- DB – Clifford Ivory
- DS – Orlondo Steinauer
- P – Noel Prefontaine
- ST – Bashir Levingston

=== Eastern Division All-Star selections ===
- WR – Tony Miles
- DT – Eric England
- CB – Adrion Smith
- DB – Clifford Ivory
- DS – Orlondo Steinauer
- P – Noel Prefontaine
- ST – Bashir Levingston
