= Jackie Mitchell (gridiron football) =

American gridiron football player (born 1976)

No. 24
- Positions: Linebacker, Safety

Personal information
- Born: May 30, 1976 (age 50); Winston-Salem, North Carolina, U.S.
- Listed height: 6 ft 1 in (1.85 m)
- Listed weight: 202 lb (92 kg)

Career information
- College: Southern

Career history
- 2000–2006: Saskatchewan Roughriders

Awards and highlights
- CFL All-Star (2003); CFL West All-Star (2003)
- Stats at CFL.ca (archive)

Jackie Mitchell (born July 30, 1976) is a former American and Canadian football linebacker who played for the Saskatchewan Roughriders of the Canadian Football League (CFL) from 2000 to 2006.

Mitchell was signed as a free agent by Saskatchewan in 2000 after being released from Edmonton Eskimos training camp. He was recognized as an All-Star in the 2003 CFL season. He attended the Miami Dolphins' (National Football League) training camp in 1999, signed with the Philadelphia Eagles in 2002 and released, and signed with the San Francisco 49ers in 2003 and released. In college, he played for Southern University.

Mitchell was waived following the 2006 CFL season and granted a release he requested from Saskatchewan in January 2007, after not receiving a contract offer. It was largely seen as a cost-saving move to meet the new CFL salary cap.
