= Brian Clark (Canadian football) =

American gridiron football player (born 1974)

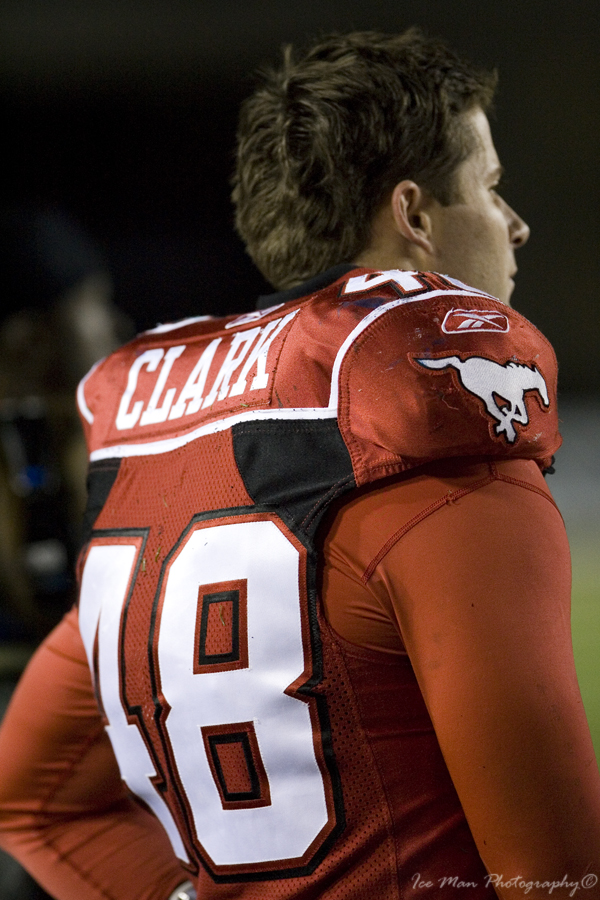
- Clark in 2007

No. 48
- Position: Linebacker

Personal information
- Born: May 5, 1974 (age 52); Quincy, Illinois
- Listed height: 6 ft 2 in (1.88 m)
- Listed weight: 224 lb (102 kg)

Career information
- College: Hofstra

Career history
- 1997–1998: Montreal Alouettes
- 2000–2003: Winnipeg Blue Bombers
- 2004–2007: Calgary Stampeders

Awards and highlights
- CFL All-Star (2006); CFL West All-Star (2006)
- Stats at CFL.ca (archive)

Brian Clark (born May 5, 1974) is a former Canadian Football League linebacker who played eleven seasons in the CFL for three teams.
