= Tim Strickland =

American gridiron football player (born 1977)

No. 38
- Position: Defensive back / Linebacker

Personal information
- Born: January 13, 1977 (age 49); Memphis, Tennessee, U.S.
- Listed height: 5 ft 10 in (1.78 m)
- Listed weight: 186 lb (84 kg)

Career information
- High school: Hamilton (Memphis)
- College: Mississippi
- NFL draft: 2000: undrafted

Career history
- Amsterdam Admirals (2001); Montreal Alouettes (2002–2007)

Awards and highlights
- Grey Cup champion (2002); 3× CFL East All-Star (2003, 2004, 2006)

Timothy Strickland (born January 13, 1977) is an American former professional football linebacker who played six seasons in the Canadian Football League (CFL) with the Montreal Alouettes. He was an Eastern Division All-Star three times.
