= Andrew Greene =

Jamaican gridiron football player (born 1969)

Profile
- Positions: Guard, Offensive tackle

Personal information
- Born: September 24, 1969 (age 57); Kingston, Jamaica
- Listed height: 6 ft 3 in (1.91 m)
- Listed weight: 315 lb (143 kg)

Career information
- High school: Pickering (Ajax, Ontario, Canada)
- College: Indiana
- NFL draft: 1995: 2nd round, 53rd overall pick
- CFL draft: 1994: 2nd round, 18th overall pick

Career history
- 1995: Miami Dolphins
- 1996: Miami Dolphins*
- 1997: Seattle Seahawks*
- 1997: Saskatchewan Roughriders
- 1998: Seattle Seahawks
- 1998: Jacksonville Jaguars*
- 1999–2006: Saskatchewan Roughriders
- 2007: Winnipeg Blue Bombers
- 2008: Toronto Argonauts
- * Offseason or practice squad member only

Awards and highlights
- CFL's Most Outstanding Offensive Lineman Award (2003); 2× DeMarco-Becket Memorial Trophy (2000, 2003); 4× CFL All-Star (2000, 2003–2005); 5× CFL West All-Star (2000, 2001, 2003–2005); Second-team All-Big Ten (1994)
- Stats at Pro Football Reference
- Stats at CFL.ca (archive)

Andrew Greene (born September 24, 1969) is a former professional gridiron football offensive tackle who played in the National Football League (NFL) and Canadian Football League (CFL). Greene, a nine-year CFL veteran, spent much of his career with the Saskatchewan Roughriders. The four-time CFL all-star was named the league's top offensive lineman in 2003.

== Early life ==
At Pickering High School in Ajax, Ontario, Greene lettered in football, basketball, rugby, and track & field.

== College career ==
At Indiana University Bloomington, Greene was a four-year letterman and a three-year starter. He was named twice named "Indiana's Outstanding Offensive Lineman", and as a senior, also won first-team All-Big Ten Conference honors and was a second-team All-American.

== Professional career ==
Greene joined the Roughriders in 1997 after spending time with the Miami Dolphins, Seattle Seahawks and Jacksonville Jaguars of the NFL. He has appeared in 116 regular season games, nine playoff games and one Grey Cup. On February 21, 2007, Greene signed as a free agent with the Winnipeg Blue Bombers, starting all 18 games for them. He went on to play for the Bombers in the 95th Grey Cup in Toronto, only to lose to his former team, the Roughriders. On September 17, 2008, Greene signed with the Toronto Argonauts and was assigned to their practice roster. At the time of his signing, he became the oldest active player in the CFL.

On January 26, 2009, Greene was released by the Argonauts.

On May 25, 2009, the Saskatchewan Roughriders signed Greene after which he promptly announced his retirement showing his desire to retire as a Roughrider. Saskatchewan Roughrider Club President/CEO Jim Hopson stated, "When a player such as Andrew wants to end a long successful career in Green and White, we gladly do our part to help. It's our way of showing appreciation for all the years of dedication and hard work he put into this organization."
