= 2003 CFL season =

Canadian Football League season

- Duration: June 17 – October 26, 2003
- East champions: Montreal Alouettes
- West champions: Edmonton Eskimos

91st Grey Cup
- Date: November 16, 2003
- Venue: Taylor Field, Regina, Saskatchewan
- Champions: Edmonton Eskimos

CFL seasons
- ← 2002 2004 →

Canadian Football League team locations: West, East

The 2003 CFL season is considered to be the 50th season in modern-day Canadian football, although it is officially the 46th Canadian Football League season. The pre-season began on May 30 and the regular season started on June 17. Taylor Field in Regina, Saskatchewan hosted the 91st Grey Cup on November 16, 2003, with the Edmonton Eskimos defeating the Montreal Alouettes 34–22.

== CFL news in 2003 ==
The Canadian Football League signed a new five-year television deal with TSN and the CBC on February 27. Through the new agreement, TSN and CBC will be broadcasting 77 games, which is the most in CFL history. The CFL also introduced new specialty weekends that includes the Canada Day Bash, the Labour Day Classic and the Gridiron Thanksgiving. CFL.ca launched its new website in July.

The CFL also assumes control of the Toronto Argonauts on July 29 and the Hamilton Tiger-Cats on August 15. The league appointed Paul Robson as the interim Operations Manager of the Argonauts and appointed Alan Ford to become interim Operations Manager of the Tiger-Cats. The CFL then announced the sale of the Hamilton Tiger-Cats to Bob Young on October 7 and then announced the sale of the Toronto Argonauts on November 15 to Howard Sokolowski and David Cynamon.

TSN achieved the second-highest viewership in CFL history. The CFL also had an (+2%) increase in attendance for the second straight season with more than 2 million fans filling the seats at Canadian football games. About 4.4 million Canadian homes viewed the 91st Grey Cup game between the Montreal Alouettes and the Edmonton Eskimos played in Regina. Plus, the CFL signed long-term partnership deals with Reebok, Rogers and Sun Microsystems.

== Regular season standings ==
West Division
Pos	Team	Pld	W	L	T	PF	PA	PD	Pts
1	Edmonton Eskimos (C, Q)	18	13	5	0	569	414	+155	26
2	Winnipeg Blue Bombers (Q)	18	11	7	0	514	487	+27	22
3	Saskatchewan Roughriders (Q)	18	11	7	0	535	430	+105	22
4	BC Lions (Q)	18	11	7	0	531	430	+101	22
5	Calgary Stampeders	18	5	13	0	323	501	−178	10

Source: "CFL.ca". Archived from the original on June 29, 2009.
(C) First round bye; (Q) Qualified for playoffs

East Division
Pos	Team	Pld	W	L	T	PF	PA	PD	Pts
1	Montreal Alouettes (C, Q)	18	13	5	0	562	409	+153	26
2	Toronto Argonauts (Q)	18	9	9	0	473	433	+40	18
3	Ottawa Renegades (Q)	18	7	11	0	467	581	−114	14
4	Hamilton Tiger-Cats	18	1	17	0	293	583	−290	2

Source: "CFL.ca". Archived from the original on June 29, 2009.
(C) First round bye; (Q) Qualified for playoffs
- Edmonton and Montreal both have first round byes.
- Due to the cross-over rule – the BC Lions will play the Toronto Argonauts in the Eastern Semi-Final Game.

== Grey Cup playoffs ==
The Edmonton Eskimos are the 2003 Grey Cup Champions, defeating the Montreal Alouettes 34–22, at Regina's Taylor Field. The Eskimos got their revenge on the Alouettes, who defeated Edmonton in front of their hometown crowd at the 90th Grey Cup. The Eskimos' Jason Tucker (WR) was named the Grey Cup's Most Valuable Player and the Alouettes' Ben Cahoon (SB) was the Grey Cup's Most Valuable Canadian.

=== Playoff bracket ===
November 2: Division Semifinals
East
W4	BC Lions	7
E2	Toronto Argonauts	28
West
W3	Saskatchewan Roughriders	37
W2	Winnipeg Blue Bombers	21

November 9: Division Finals
E2	Toronto Argonauts	26
E1	Montreal Alouettes	30
W3	Saskatchewan Roughriders	23
W1	Edmonton Eskimos	30

November 16: 91st Grey Cup; Taylor Field – Regina, SK
E1	Montreal Alouettes	22
W1	Edmonton Eskimos	34

== CFL leaders ==
- CFL passing leaders
- CFL rushing leaders
- CFL receiving leaders

== 2003 CFL All-Stars ==
=== Offence ===
- QB – Anthony Calvillo, Montreal Alouettes
- RB – Mike Pringle, Edmonton Eskimos
- RB – Charles Roberts, Winnipeg Blue Bombers
- SB – Jeremaine Copeland, Montreal Alouettes
- SB – Geroy Simon, BC Lions
- WR – Tony Miles, Toronto Argonauts
- WR – Ed Hervey, Edmonton Eskimos
- C – Bryan Chiu, Montreal Alouettes
- OG – Andrew Greene, Saskatchewan Roughriders
- OG – Scott Flory, Montreal Alouettes
- OT – Bruce Beaton, Edmonton Eskimos
- OT – Uzooma Okeke, Montreal Alouettes

=== Defence ===
- DT – Eric England, Toronto Argonauts
- DT – Joe Fleming, Calgary Stampeders
- DE – Daved Benefield, Winnipeg Blue Bombers
- DE – Ray Jacobs, BC Lions
- LB – Reggie Hunt, Saskatchewan Roughriders
- LB – Barrin Simpson, BC Lions
- LB – Jackie Mitchell, Saskatchewan Roughriders
- CB – Omarr Morgan, Saskatchewan Roughriders
- CB – Adrion Smith, Toronto Argonauts
- DB – Donny Brady, Edmonton Eskimos
- DB – Clifford Ivory, Toronto Argonauts
- DS – Orlondo Steinauer, Toronto Argonauts

=== Special teams ===
- P – Noel Prefontaine, Toronto Argonauts
- K – Lawrence Tynes, Ottawa Renegades
- ST – Bashir Levingston, Toronto Argonauts

== 2003 Western All-Stars ==
=== Offence ===
- QB – Dave Dickenson, BC Lions
- RB – Mike Pringle, Edmonton Eskimos
- RB – Charles Roberts, Winnipeg Blue Bombers
- SB – Terry Vaughn, Edmonton Eskimos
- SB – Geroy Simon, BC Lions
- WR – Darnell McDonald, Calgary Stampeders
- WR – Ed Hervey, Edmonton Eskimos
- C – Jeremy O'Day, Saskatchewan Roughriders
- OG – Andrew Greene, Saskatchewan Roughriders
- OG – Dan Comiskey, Edmonton Eskimos
- OT – Bruce Beaton, Edmonton Eskimos
- OT – Cory Mantyka, BC Lions

=== Defence ===
- DT – Nathan Davis, Saskatchewan Roughriders
- DT – Joe Fleming, Calgary Stampeders
- DE – Daved Benefield, Winnipeg Blue Bombers
- DE – Ray Jacobs, BC Lions
- LB – Reggie Hunt, Saskatchewan Roughriders
- LB – Barrin Simpson, BC Lions
- LB – Jackie Mitchell, Saskatchewan Roughriders
- CB – Omarr Morgan, Saskatchewan Roughriders
- CB – Eric Carter, BC Lions
- DB – Donny Brady, Edmonton Eskimos
- DB – Shannon Garrett, Edmonton Eskimos
- DS – Mark Washington, BC Lions

=== Special teams ===
- P – Sean Fleming, Edmonton Eskimos
- K – Paul McCallum, Saskatchewan Roughriders
- ST – Wane McGarity, Calgary Stampeders

== 2003 Eastern All-Stars ==
=== Offence ===
- QB – Anthony Calvillo, Montreal Alouettes
- RB – Josh Ranek, Ottawa Renegades
- RB – Troy Davis, Hamilton Tiger-Cats
- SB – Jeremaine Copeland, Montreal Alouettes
- SB – Ben Cahoon, Montreal Alouettes
- WR – Tony Miles, Toronto Argonauts
- C – Bryan Chiu, Montreal Alouettes
- OG – Val St. Germain, Ottawa Renegades
- OG – Scott Flory, Montreal Alouettes
- OT – Neal Fort, Montreal Alouettes
- OT – Uzooma Okeke, Montreal Alouettes

=== Defence ===
- DT – Eric England, Toronto Argonauts
- DT – Ed Philion, Montreal Alouettes
- DE – Tim Cheatwood, Hamilton Tiger-Cats
- DE – Anwar Stewart, Montreal Alouettes
- LB – Kevin Johnson, Montreal Alouettes
- LB – Kelly Wiltshire, Ottawa Renegades
- LB – Tim Strickland, Montreal Alouettes
- CB – Brandon Hamilton, Hamilton Tiger-Cats
- CB – Adrion Smith, Toronto Argonauts
- DB – Barron Miles, Montreal Alouettes
- DB – Clifford Ivory, Toronto Argonauts
- DS – Orlondo Steinauer, Toronto Argonauts

=== Special teams ===
- P – Noel Prefontaine, Toronto Argonauts
- K – Lawrence Tynes, Ottawa Renegades
- ST – Bashir Levingston, Toronto Argonauts

== 2003 Intergold CFLPA All-Stars ==
=== Offence ===
- QB – Anthony Calvillo, Montreal Alouettes
- OT – Uzooma Okeke, Montreal Alouettes
- OT – Bruce Beaton, Edmonton Eskimos
- OG – Andrew Greene, Saskatchewan Roughriders
- OG – Dan Comiskey, Edmonton Eskimos
- C – Bryan Chiu, Montreal Alouettes
- RB – Charles Roberts, Winnipeg Blue Bombers
- FB – Michael Sellers, Winnipeg Blue Bombers
- SB – Geroy Simon, BC Lions
- SB – Terry Vaughn, Edmonton Eskimos
- WR – Jeremaine Copeland, Montreal Alouettes
- WR – Ed Hervey, Edmonton Eskimos

=== Defence ===
- DE – Timothy Cheatwood, Hamilton Tiger-Cats
- DE – Eric England, Toronto Argonauts
- DT – Joe Fleming, Calgary Stampeders
- DT – Demetrious Maxie, Calgary Stampeders
- LB – Barrin Simpson, BC Lions
- LB – Reggie Hunt, Saskatchewan Roughriders
- LB – Brian Clark, Winnipeg Blue Bombers
- CB – Omarr Morgan, Saskatchewan Roughriders
- CB – Davis Sanchez, Calgary Stampeders
- HB – Clifford Ivory, Toronto Argonauts
- HB – Barron Miles, Montreal Alouettes
- S – Donnavan Carter, Ottawa Renegades

=== Special teams ===
- K – Lawrence Tynes, Ottawa Renegades
- P – Noel Prefontaine, Toronto Argonauts
- ST – Bashir Levingston, Toronto Argonauts

=== Head coach ===
- Joe Paopao, Ottawa Renegades

== 2003 Rogers AT&T CFL Awards ==
- CFL's Most Outstanding Player Award – Anthony Calvillo (QB), Montreal Alouettes
- CFL's Most Outstanding Canadian Award – Ben Cahoon (SB), Montreal Alouettes
- CFL's Most Outstanding Defensive Player Award – Joe Fleming (DT), Calgary Stampeders
- CFL's Most Outstanding Offensive Lineman Award – Andrew Greene (OG), Saskatchewan Roughriders
- CFL's Most Outstanding Rookie Award – Frank Cutolo (WR), BC Lions
- CFL's Most Outstanding Special Teams Award – Bashir Levingston (WR), Toronto Argonauts
- CFLPA's Outstanding Community Service Award – Steve Hardin (OT), BC Lions
- Rogers AT&T Fans' Choice Award – Ricky Ray (QB), Edmonton Eskimos
- CFL's Coach of the Year – Tom Higgins, Edmonton Eskimos
- Commissioner's Award - TSN, Toronto
