= Ben Cahoon =

American gridiron football player (born 1972)

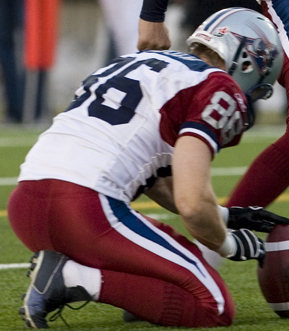
- Cahoon with the Montreal Alouettes in 2007

No. 86
- Position: Slotback

Personal information
- Born: July 16, 1972 (age 54); Orem, Utah, U.S.
- Listed height: 5 ft 9 in (1.75 m)
- Listed weight: 185 lb (84 kg)

Career information
- College: Ricks College (1993–1994) and BYU (1996–1997)
- CFL draft: 1998: 1st round, 6th overall pick

Career history
- Montreal Alouettes (1998–2010)

Awards and highlights
- 3× Grey Cup champion (2002, 2009, 2010); 3× CFL All-Star (1999, 2004, 2008); 10× CFL East All-Star (1999, 2000, 2002–2009); 2× CFL Most Outstanding Canadian (2002, 2003); CFL records: Receptions by a Canadian receiver in a career (1,017); Receptions by a Canadian receiver in a season; Receptions in a career in Grey Cup Games; Receiving yards in a career in Grey Cup games; Touchdowns by an Alouette
- Stats at CFL.ca (archive)
- Canadian Football Hall of Fame (Class of 2014)

Ben Cahoon (born July 16, 1972) is a Canadian-American former professional football slotback who spent his entire career with the Montreal Alouettes of the Canadian Football League (CFL). He won the award for the Most Outstanding Canadian in the CFL two years in a row in 2002 and 2003.

At the time of his retirement after the 2010 season, Cahoon ranked sixth overall in career receiving yards with 13,301 yards and the all-time leader overall in pass receptions with 1,017. He is also the all-time leading receiver in Grey Cup history with 46 receptions and 658 receiving yards.

== Early life ==
Cahoon was born in Utah but qualified as a Canadian in the CFL because his parents were Canadian and he spent part of his childhood in Cardston, Alberta. Throughout his career Cahoon steadfastly maintained he felt he was Canadian despite being born in the U.S. and attending both high school and college in Utah.

Cahoon played his high school sports at Mountain View High School in Orem, Utah, where he earned All-Region and All-State honors in football, basketball, and soccer. He was named Mountain View's Athlete of the Year in 1990.

== College career ==
Cahoon played two seasons (1993–94) at Ricks College, now known as Brigham Young University–Idaho, in Rexburg, Idaho. He set school records for most receptions and most receiving yards in a single season and in a career. In 1994, he ranked second in the nation in receiving and was named Junior College All-American. He transferred to Brigham Young University in Provo, Utah. He played in every game for the Cougars in 1996, when BYU became the first Division I-A team in NCAA history to win 14 games in a single season. In his senior year (1997), Cahoon became BYU's top receiver with 84 catches. He averaged 84.6 receiving yards per game during that season including an 8-catch, 217-yard performance in the Cougars' 13–10 win at Arizona State University.

== Professional career ==
After going undrafted at the 1998 NFL draft, Cahoon tried out for the Tampa Bay Buccaneers before being released. He was drafted by the Montreal Alouettes in the first round (sixth overall) in the 1998 CFL draft. He won the 90th Grey Cup, 97th Grey Cup and 98th Grey Cup with Montreal in 2002, 2009 and 2010. He was named Grey Cup Most Valuable Canadian in both 2002 and 2009. His number with the Montreal Alouettes is 86. His jersey was retired on July 29, 2016, at Percival Molson Stadium in Montréal.

In 2004, Cahoon was part of a CFL precedent with four receivers on one team reaching the 1000-yard mark in one season: Cahoon with 1183 yards, Jeremaine Copeland with 1154 yards, Thyron Anderson with 1147 yards, and Kwame Cavil with 1090 yards. The 2005 Montreal Alouettes would repeat this feat, with Cahoon the only player repeating: the four receivers consisted of Kerry Watkins (1364 yards), Terry Vaughn (1113 yards), Cahoon (1067 yards), and Dave Stala (1037 yards).

On August 2, 2007, Cahoon kicked a game winning 22-yard field goal in overtime in a 30–27 victory over the Toronto Argonauts. He replaced Damon Duval, who had been ejected from the game.

Ben Cahoon stands only 5'9, but is able to bench press 225 lbs 19 times. He is also considered to be one of the greatest slotbacks ever, and was nominated with Anthony Calvillo for the CFL Greatest QB-WR Combo of All Time. He was named an East Division All-Star in 1999, 2000, 2002, 2003, 2004, 2005, 2006, 2007, 2008 and 2009. He has also been named a CFL All Star on numerous occasions. In 2008, Cahoon broke Peter Dalla Riva's record for most touchdowns ever by an Alouette receiver. He has had nine 1,000 yard receiving seasons, including a streak of eight straight.

On December 15, 2008, Cahoon re-signed with the Alouettes, where the deal called for a one-year contract with an option. This enabled him to play his 12th CFL season, all of them with the Montreal Alouettes. On May 14, 2010, Cahoon confirmed his return for the 2010 season.

On October 11, 2010, in a home game against the Calgary Stampeders, Cahoon became the CFL's all-time reception leader, catching his 1,007th career pass from Anthony Calvillo in the 4th quarter. The previous record of 1,006 was held by Terry Vaughn.

On January 26, 2011, Cahoon announced his retirement.

In 2014, Cahoon was inducted into the Canadian Football Hall of Fame. On July 29, 2016, his number 86 was retired by the Montreal Alouettes in a ceremony during half-time of their game against the Saskatchewan Roughriders.

== Coaching career ==
On February 1, 2011, Brigham Young University head football coach, Bronco Mendenhall, announced Cahoon would join the BYU coaching staff as the wide receivers coach. He served in that role through the end of the 2012 season, after which the school re-hired its former offensive coordinator Robert Anae, leading to Cahoon being released on January 15, 2013. Cahoon returned to the coaching staff for the 2016 season under new head coach Kalani Sitake and offensive coordinator Ty Detmer for 2 seasons.

== Statistics ==
Receiving		Regular season						Playoffs
Year	Team	Games	Catch	Yards	Avg	Long	TD	Games	No.	Yards	Avg	Long	TD
1998	MTL	18	33	471	14.3	36	3	2	0	0	0.0	0	0
1999	MTL	18	52	846	16.1	48	2	1	5	67	13.4	23	0
2000	MTL	18	71	1,022	14.4	73	5	1	3	95	31.7	59	1
2001	MTL	18	56	809	14.4	68	1	1	2	29	14.5	20	0
2002	MTL	18	75	1,060	14.2	52	6	2	5	62	12.2	15	0
2003	MTL	18	112	1,561	13.9	66	13	2	11	182	16.5	69	2
2004	MTL	16	93	1,183	12.7	60	6	1	7	109	15.6	25	0
2005	MTL	14	73	1,067	14.6	73	9	3	21	288	13.7	52	1
2006	MTL	17	99	1,190	12.0	51	4	2	14	174	12.4	25	0
2007	MTL	17	90	1,127	12.5	97	5	1	2	30	15.0	19	0
2008	MTL	17	107	1,231	11.5	29	7	2	13	183	14.1	35	0
2009	MTL	18	89	1,031	11.6	30	2	2	7	76	10.9	18	1
2010	MTL	17	67	703	10.5	29	2	2	6	58	9.7	17	0
CFL totals		224	1,017	13,301	13.1	97	65	23	92	1,353	14.7	69	5

== Honors ==
- Grey Cup Most Outstanding Canadian: 2003, 2009
- CFL Most Outstanding Canadian: 2002, 2003
- East Division Most Outstanding Canadian: 2002, 2003, 2008, 2009
- Alouettes' Most Outstanding Player: 2006, 2007
- Alouettes' Most Outstanding Canadian: 2002, 2003, 2004, 2005, 2006, 2007, 2008, 2009, 2010
- CFL All-Star: 1999, 2004, 2008
- East Division All-Star: 1999, 2000, 2002, 2003, 2004, 2005, 2006, 2007, 2008, 2009
- CFLPA All-Star: 2002
- CFLPA East Division All-Star: 1999, 2000, 2001, 2002, 2003, 2004, 2005
- No. 86 retired by Montreal Alouettes: July 29, 2016

Cahoon had caught at least one pass in 202 of his last 203 games and at least one pass in each of his last 144 games.

== Personal life ==
Cahoon was owner of Power Pad Insoles, LLC, a company that sells performance enhancing insoles.

Cahoon and his wife, Kimberli, have four daughters. As a result of his marriage, he is the son-in-law of former Utah Governor Gary R. Herbert.

A devout member of the Church of Jesus Christ of Latter-day Saints, Cahoon said he disliked playing football on Sunday, which he believed should be reserved for rest and prayer.
