= Ed Philion =

Canadian gridiron football player and coach (born 1970)

No. 75
- Position: Defensive tackle

Personal information
- Born: March 27, 1970 (age 56); Windsor, Ontario, Canada
- Listed height: 6 ft 2 in (1.88 m)
- Listed weight: 273 lb (124 kg)

Career information
- College: Ferris State
- CFL draft: 1994: 1st round, 11th overall pick

Career history

Playing
- 1994: Calgary Stampeders*
- 1994–1995: Buffalo Bills
- 1996: Carolina Panthers
- 1998: Rhein Fire
- 1998: Jacksonville Jaguars
- 1999–2006: Montreal Alouettes
- * Offseason or practice squad member only

Coaching
- 2013: Toronto Argonauts (DL coach)
- 2014–2015: Edmonton Eskimos (DL coach)
- 2016–2018: Saskatchewan Roughriders (DL coach)

Awards and highlights
- 2× Grey Cup champion (2002, 2015); World Bowl champion (1998); 4× CFL East All-Star (2003, 2004, 2005, 2006)
- Stats at Pro Football Reference
- Stats at CFL.ca

Edmond Paul Philion (born March 27, 1970) is a Canadian former professional football defensive tackle who played in the National Football League (NFL) and Canadian Football League (CFL). He won the 90th Grey Cup in 2002 and was a CFL East Division All-Star from 2003 through 2006. Philion was a hockey player for the Essex 73's Jr.C. team in the mid-1980s.

Philion was the defensive line coach for the Toronto Argonauts in 2013, and then for the Edmonton Eskimos from 2014 to 2015. He became the DL coach of the Edmonton Eskimos in January 2014.
