= Reggie Hunt =

American gridiron football player (born 1977)

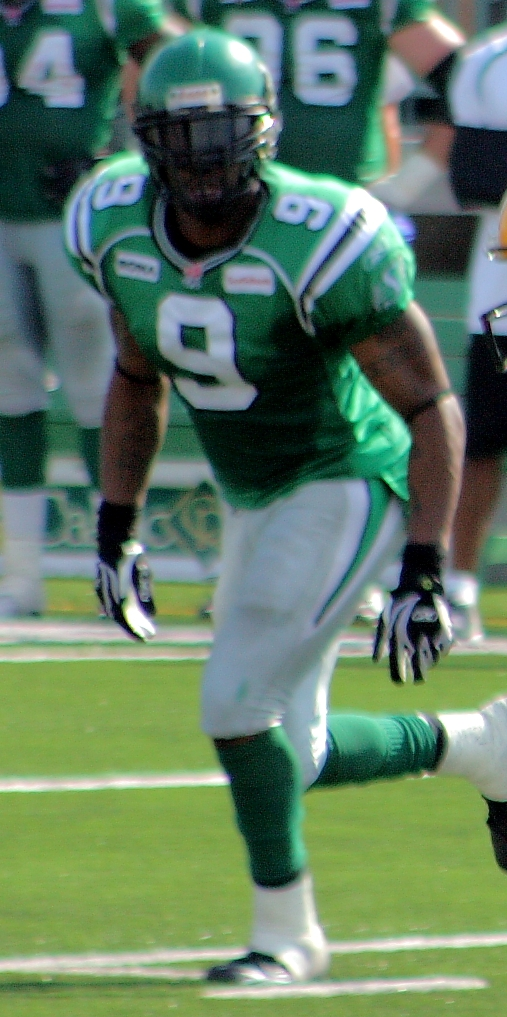
- Hunt while with the Saskatchewan Roughriders in 2007

Profile
- Position: Linebacker

Personal information
- Born: October 14, 1977 (age 49); Denison, Texas, U.S.
- Listed height: 6 ft 0 in (1.83 m)
- Listed weight: 220 lb (100 kg)

Career information
- High school: Denison
- College: Texas Christian

Career history
- 2001: Scottish Claymores
- 2002–2007: Saskatchewan Roughriders
- 2008: Montreal Alouettes
- 2009: Edmonton Eskimos

Awards and highlights
- Grey Cup champion (2007); CFL All-Star (2003); 4× CFL West All-Star (2003, 2004, 2006, 2007)
- Stats at CFL.ca (archive)

Reggie Hunt (born October 14, 1977) is an American former professional football linebacker who played in the Canadian Football League (CFL) with the Saskatchewan Roughriders, Montreal Alouettes, and Edmonton Eskimos. He was signed by the Scottish Claymores as a street free agent in 2001. He played college football for the TCU Horned Frogs.

== Early life ==
Hunt attended Denison High School in Denison, Texas, and lettered in football and basketball.

Following high school graduation, Hunt attended Texas Christian University. As a senior, he won All-WAC honors at both safety and kick returner positions, and set the Horned Frogs single season kick return average record (34.1 yards). He finished his career with three interceptions, 271 tackles, and seven forced fumbles.

== Professional career ==
=== Scottish Claymores ===
Hunt played a year of professional football with the NFL Europe Scottish Claymores in 2001. He finished the year with two interceptions, 30 tackles, and four forced fumbles.

=== Saskatchewan Roughriders ===
Hunt was signed as a free agent by Saskatchewan on May 17, 2002. His job was to replace departed linebacker George White (who had signed as a free agent with the Calgary Stampeders). He quickly solidified himself as a force in the Canadian Football League and was named a CFL All-Star in 2003, as well as a two-time CFL Western Division All-Star in 2004 and 2006. Hunt won a Grey Cup championship with the Roughriders in 2007. He once held the CFL record for most tackles in a single game (16). Simoni Lawrence of the Hamilton Tiger Cats broke the previous record of 16 tackles in one single game in 2019 with a total of 17.

=== Montreal Alouettes ===
On February 19, 2008, it was reported that he had signed with the Montreal Alouettes. Hunt dressed and played in 14 games with the Alouettes as well as the East Final and the 96th Grey Cup loss. After the Alouettes decided to start non-import Shea Emry at middle linebacker, he was released on June 25, 2009.

=== Edmonton Eskimos ===
Hunt signed with the Edmonton Eskimos on September 25, 2009, reuniting him with former defensive coordinator Richie Hall, but was released the following offseason.

== Personal life ==
Hunt is the older brother of Aaron Hunt, a former defensive lineman in the CFL, having spent the majority of his six years in the league with the BC Lions (2006 - 2011). Hunt officially announced his retirement on October 26, 2011, by signing a one-day contract with the Saskatchewan Roughriders so he could retire as a Roughrider. After retiring, he moved back home to Texas with and lives there with his 2 children.
