= Tony Miles (Canadian football) =

American gridiron football player (born 1978)

Profile
- Position: Wide receiver

Personal information
- Born: May 16, 1978 (age 48); Mart, Texas, U.S.

Career information
- High school: Mart (TX)
- College: Northwest Missouri State
- NFL draft: 2000: undrafted

Career history
- 2002: Hamilton Tiger-Cats
- 2003–2007: Toronto Argonauts
- 2008: Hamilton Tiger-Cats

Awards and highlights
- Grey Cup champion (2004); CFL All-Star (2003); CFL East All-Star (2003)

Tony Miles (born May 16, 1978) is a former Canadian Football League (CFL) wide receiver/punt returner.

== College career ==
Miles attended Northwest Missouri State University. As a freshman, he was an All-MIAA first team selection at wide receiver, and a second team All-MIAA selection at running back. As a senior, he was a first team All-MIAA selection at both, wide receiver and kick returner. As a senior, he was an NCAA Division II All-American, a first team All-MIAA selection at both, wide receiver and kick returner, the MIAA offensive MVP, and one of five players from the NCAA Division II level selected to play in the Hula Bowl. He left school as the all-time career leader in receiving yards (3,079 yards), receiving touchdowns (30 TDs), punt return yardage (1,302 yards), and punts returned for touchdowns (three touchdowns).

Miles was listed on the 2026 ballot for the College Football Hall of Fame but did not receive enough votes to be inducted.

== Canadian Football League career ==
Miles began his CFL career with the Tiger-Cats in 2002, but was traded to the Toronto Argonauts in 2003 along with fullback Randy Bowles for defensive end Joe Montford. It was with the Argonauts that Miles won a Grey Cup championship in 2004. On February 16, 2008, Miles re-signed with the Tiger-Cats as a free agent.
