= Brandon Hamilton =

American gridiron football player (born 1972)

Profile
- Position: Cornerback

Personal information
- Born: March 5, 1972 (age 54); Baton Rouge, Louisiana, U.S.

Career information
- College: Tulane

Career history
- 1994: Edmonton Eskimos
- 1995: Shreveport Pirates
- 1996: British Columbia Lions
- 1997–2000: Winnipeg Blue Bombers
- 2001–2003: Hamilton Tiger-Cats

Awards and highlights
- CFL East All-Star (2003)

Brandon Hamilton (born March 5, 1972) is a former cornerback who played ten seasons in the Canadian Football League.
