= Tom Higgins (Canadian football) =

American gridiron football player and coach (born 1954)

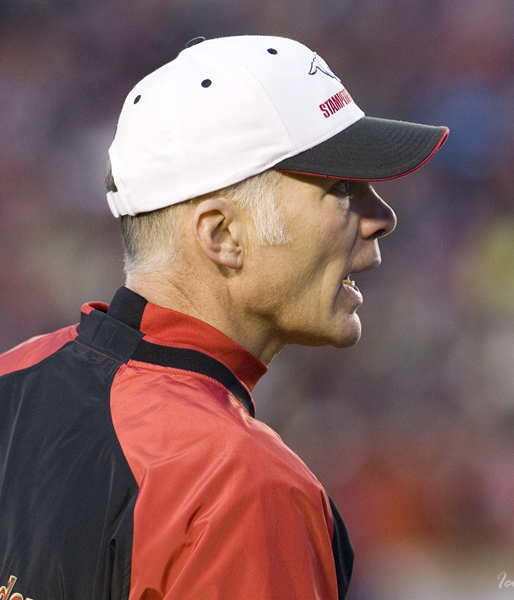
- Higgins with the Calgary Stampeders in 2007

Calgary Colts
- Title: Defensive coordinator

Personal information
- Born: July 13, 1954 (age 72); Woodbridge, New Jersey, U.S.
- Listed height: 6 ft 2 in (1.88 m)
- Listed weight: 235 lb (107 kg)

Career information
- Positions: Linebacker, defensive tackle (No. 75, 54)
- High school: Colonia (Woodbridge)
- College: NC State

Career history

Playing
- Calgary Stampeders (1976); New York Giants (1978)*; Cleveland Browns (1979)*; Buffalo Bills (1979); Saskatchewan Roughriders (1980)
- * Offseason or practice squad member only

Coaching
- Calgary Dinos (1982–1984) (DC); Calgary Stampeders (1985–1987) (DL); Calgary Stampeders (1988) (OL); Calgary Stampeders (1989–1990) (OC); Calgary Stampeders (1991–1992) (DL); Calgary Stampeders (1993) (Asst. HC); Edmonton Eskimos (2001–2004) (HC); Calgary Stampeders (2005–2007) (HC); Montreal Alouettes (2014–2015) (HC); Calgary Dinos (2016) (DC); Alberta Golden Bears (2020–2022) (DC); Calgary Colts (2023–present) (DC)

Operations
- Edmonton Eskimos (1994–1996) (Asst. GM); Edmonton Eskimos (1997–2001) (GM/COO); Edmonton Eskimos (2001–2004) (GM); CFL Director of Officiating (2008–2013)

Awards and highlights
- 2× Grey Cup champion (1992, 2003); 2× Annis Stukus Trophy (2003, 2005); Vanier Cup champion (1983); Second-team All-American (1975); First-team All-ACC (1975)
- Stats at Pro Football Reference

Thomas Joseph John Higgins Jr. (born July 13, 1954) is an American football coach and former player who is the defensive coordinator for the Calgary Colts of the Canadian Junior Football League (CJFL). He has previously served as the director of officiating for the Canadian Football League (CFL) and is a former Canadian and American football player, head coach, and general manager.

== Early life ==
Higgins, the son of former Philadelphia Eagles tackle Tom Higgins Sr., was a high school football standout at Colonia High School in Woodbridge Township, New Jersey. He played nose guard for the Wolfpack at North Carolina State. He was an All-American and was a starter in four consecutive bowl games. He was also an All-American wrestler at NC State.

== Professional playing career ==
After graduating from college in 1976, Higgins attempted to enter the National Football League (NFL), but was not selected in the 1976 NFL draft. He played in ten games for the Calgary Stampeders of the Canadian Football League (CFL) in 1976 as a defensive tackle. He was released on June 24, 1977, before the start of the 1977 CFL season.

Higgins signed with the New York Giants in 1978, but was later released on August 15, 1978. He signed with the Cleveland Browns on April 12, 1979, and was released on July 22. He was claimed off waivers by the Buffalo Bills the next day. Higgins was released by Buffalo on August 21 but resigned on September 1, 1979. He played in all 16 games for the Bills during the 1979 NFL season, and was listed as a linebacker. He was waived on August 20, 1980.

Higgins then signed with the Saskatchewan Roughriders in August 1980. He played in seven games for Saskatchewan during the 1980 season as a linebacker.

== Coaching career ==
After retiring as a player, Higgins began coaching at the University of Calgary, winning the 1983 CIS title in the second of his three years as an assistant coach under Canadian Football Hall of Fame coach Peter Connellan. In 1985, Higgins joined the Stampeders coaching staff, serving in many different capacities until becoming a head coach in 2001.

Higgins became head coach of the CFL's Edmonton Eskimos later that year, leading the team to the playoffs in each of his four seasons. In 2002 and 2003, he won division titles, and he won a single Grey Cup as a head coach, with the Eskimos in 2003.

In 2005, he returned to the Calgary Stampeders as head coach. He held this position for three years, making the playoffs in each. He was fired after a first round loss during the 2007 playoffs.

Higgins served as the Director of Officiating from April 2008 to December 2013.

Higgins was hired as the new head coach of the Montreal Alouettes on February 24, 2014. He coached a historic 2014 football season starting 1–7, turning the team around to a 9-9 second-place finish, hosting a play off game and defeating the BC Lions. On August 21, 2015, Alouettes ownership relieved Higgins of his coaching duties.

Higgins was hired in early 2020 as the defensive coordinator of the University of Alberta Golden Bears. After the 2020 season was cancelled, he coached for two seasons with the Golden Bears.

On April 1, 2023, it was announced that Higgins had been hired as the defensive coordinator for the Calgary Colts.

=== CFL head coaching record ===
Team	Year	Regular season					Postseason		
Team	Year	Won	Lost	Ties	Win %	Finish	Won	Lost	Result
EDM	2001	9	9	0	.500	1st in West Division	0	1	Lost in Division Finals
EDM	2002	13	5	0	.722	1st in West Division	1	1	Lost 90th Grey Cup
EDM	2003	13	5	0	.722	1st in West Division	2	0	Won 91st Grey Cup
EDM	2004	9	9	0	.500	2nd in West Division	0	1	Lost in Division Semi-Finals
CGY	2005	11	7	0	.611	2nd in West Division	0	1	Lost in Division Semi-Finals
CGY	2006	10	8	0	.556	2nd in West Division	0	1	Lost in Division Semi-Finals
CGY	2007	7	10	1	.417	3rd in West Division	0	1	Lost in Division Semi-Finals
MTL	2014	9	9	0	.500	2nd in East Division	1	1	Lost in Division Finals
MTL	2015	3	5	0	.375	4th in East Division	0	0	Relieved of duties
Total		84	67	1	.556	3 Division Championships	4	7	1 Grey Cup

== Personal ==
Tom and his wife Sharon have three grown children, Holly, Hillary and Thomas.

Preceded by Don Matthews	Grey Cup-winning head coach 91st Grey Cup, 2003	Succeeded by Pinball Clemons
