= Frank Cutolo =

American gridiron football player (born 1976)

Profile
- Position: Slotback

Personal information
- Born: January 8, 1978 (age 48); Boca Raton, Florida, U.S.

Career information
- College: Eastern Illinois University

Career history
- 2003–2004: British Columbia Lions
- 2005: Ottawa Renegades

Awards and highlights
- CFL's Most Outstanding Rookie Award (2003); Jackie Parker Trophy (2003)

Frank Cutolo (born 1978) is a former award-winning college and Canadian Football League slotback.

Cutolo played his college football at Eastern Illinois University from 1998 to 2001. As a receiver he caught 119 passes for 2182 yards. He was a second team Ohio Valley Conference all-star in 2001, partly on the strength of his record setting performance against Tennessee State, when he set a team record for receiving yards in a game (239) on October 27, 2001.

He became a professional with the British Columbia Lions in 2003, and his 64 pass receptions, 908 yards, 93 punt and kick off returns and 9 touchdowns were good for the CFL's Most Outstanding Rookie Award. His performance dropped off in 2004 (47 receptions for 786 yards, with 9 TDs) and he was eventually cut from the team. The Lions' coach, Wally Buono, chalked it up to burnout: ""He was a young guy, not big, a rookie that we beat to death ... Sometimes you don’t do things as smart as you should." He played one final year with the Ottawa Renegades where he caught 21 passes for 222 yards and one touchdown.
