= Paul Robson (Canadian football) =

Canadian gridiron football player (born 1941)

Profile
- Positions: Center, Linebacker

Personal information
- Born: January 30, 1941 (age 85); Winnipeg, Manitoba, Canada
- Listed height: 6 ft 1 in (1.85 m)
- Listed weight: 228 lb (103 kg)

Career information
- College: North Dakota

Career history
- 1964–1972: Winnipeg Blue Bombers

Paul Robson, OM (born January 30, 1941) is a former Canadian football player who played for the Winnipeg Blue Bombers. He played college football at the University of North Dakota. He served as assistant general manager of the Winnipeg Blue Bombers between 1974 and 1983.

From 1987 to 1988, he served as general manager of the Ottawa Rough Riders.

Robson would go on to be inducted into the Winnipeg Blue Bombers Hall of Fame in 1991, and serve as CEO for both Red River Exhibition, and the Canad Inns Corporation.

In 2017, he was made a Member of the Order of Manitoba.

In 2020, Robson was inducted into the Manitoba Sports Hall of Fame.
