= Omar Evans =

American gridiron football player (born 1976)

Profile
- Position: Cornerback

Personal information
- Born: September 1, 1976 (age 50); Silver Spring, Maryland

Career information
- College: Howard University

Career history
- 2001–2002: Saskatchewan Roughriders
- 2003: Montreal Alouettes
- 2004: Calgary Stampeders
- 2005–2006: Winnipeg Blue Bombers

Omar Evans (born September 1, 1976, in Silver Spring, Maryland) is a former Canadian Football League defensive back who has played for the Montreal Alouettes, Saskatchewan Roughriders, Calgary Stampeders, and Winnipeg Blue Bombers.

== Achievements ==
Evans was among the CFL's top defensive players in 2005. He had 5 interceptions which led the Blue Bombers and returned two of those picks for touchdowns.

== College years ==
Evans attended Howard University and was a letterman in football. As a senior, he was won All-MEAC first team honors and was selected as Howard's Defensive Player of the Year, and finished his senior season with 25 tackles, and a team-leading five interceptions.
