= Sylvain Girard =

Canadian football player (born 1975)

No. 3
- Position: Wide receiver

Personal information
- Born: October 3, 1975 (age 51); Chicoutimi, Quebec, Canada
- Listed height: 6 ft 0 in (1.83 m)
- Listed weight: 204 lb (93 kg)

Career information
- University: Concordia
- CFL draft: 1999: 1st round, 5th overall pick

Career history
- 1999–2006: Montreal Alouettes

Awards and highlights
- Grey Cup champion (2002)
- Stats at CFL.ca (archive)

Sylvain Girard (born October 3, 1975) is a Canadian former professional football wide receiver who played eight seasons for the Montreal Alouettes of the Canadian Football League. He won a Grey Cup championship with the Alouettes in 2002. Girard announced his retirement from professional football on February 28, 2007. He moved on to work at the Collège Sainte-Anne to coach football. He played CIS football for the Concordia Stingers.
