= Adrion Smith =

American gridiron football player (born 1971)

Profile
- Position: Cornerback

Personal information
- Born: September 29, 1971 (age 55); Kansas City, Missouri, U.S.

Career information
- College: Southwest Missouri State

Career history
- 1994: Hamilton Tiger-Cats
- 1995: Memphis Mad Dogs
- 1996–1997: Toronto Argonauts
- 1998: Buffalo Bills*
- 1998–2005: Toronto Argonauts
- * Offseason or practice squad member only

Awards and highlights
- 3× Grey Cup champion (1996, 1997, 2004); 3× CFL All-Star (1999, 2002, 2003); 6× CFL East All-Star (1996,1997, 1999, 2002, 2003, 2005)
- Stats at CFL.ca

Adrion "Pee Wee" Smith (born September 29, 1971) is a former football player in the CFL for twelve years. Smith played defensive back for the Hamilton Tiger-Cats, Memphis Mad Dogs and Toronto Argonauts from 1994 to 2005. He was a CFL All-Star four times and won three Grey Cup Championships (1996, 1997 and 2004) with the Argos. Smith was noted for occasionally playing quarterback as well as returning punts. As such, he was considered relatively versatile. He played college football at Southwest Missouri State University where he was inducted into the university's Hall of Fame. In 2007, he was a radio analyst for the Argonauts. In 2008, Smith was a CFL analyst on Rogers Sportsnet.

== Professional career ==
=== Hamilton Tiger-Cats ===
Smith signed with the Hamilton Tiger-Cats in March 1994 and played 14 regular season games that season.

=== Memphis Mad Dogs ===
Smith was acquired by the Memphis Mad Dogs for the 1995 season. He played 15 games that year and returned a punt for a touchdown.

=== Toronto Argonauts (first stint) ===
Smith joined the Toronto Argonauts for the 1996 season. In the Grey Cup game, he returned an interception 49 yards for a touchdown to help secure his first Grey Cup win.

In 1997, Smith won his second consecutive Grey Cup, a game in which he returned a kickoff 95 yards for a touchdown. This kickoff return set the record for the longest kickoff return in Grey Cup history.

=== Buffalo Bills ===
Smith signed with the NFL's Buffalo Bills on January 28, 1998. He was released by the team after training camp.

=== Toronto Argonauts (second stint) ===
Smith returned to the Argonauts in September 1998, and played 8 games for the team that year.

He won his third Grey Cup with the Argonauts in 2004.

Smith played in 2005, then he retired in the off-season.

== Personal life ==
Smith married Denise Warriner. They share three children, Makayla, Kiondré and Charlize. In 2022, Kiondré followed in his father's footsteps and was drafted into the CFL by the Hamilton Tiger-Cats.
