= 2003 Calgary Stampeders season =

Canadian football team season

- Head coach: Jim Barker
- Home stadium: McMahon Stadium

Results
- Record: 5–13
- Division place: 5th, West
- Playoffs: did not qualify

Uniform

The 2003 Calgary Stampeders season was the 46th season for the team in the Canadian Football League (CFL) and their 65th overall. The Stampeders finished in fifth place in the West Division with a 5–13 record and failed to make the playoffs.

== Offseason ==
=== CFL draft ===
| Rd | Pick | Player | Position | School |
|---|---|---|---|---|
| 1 | 1 | Steve Morley | OL | Saint Mary's |
| 1 | 2 | Joe McGrath | OT | Miami |
| 1 | 5 | Wes Lysack | DB | Manitoba |
| 1 | 7 | Marc Calixte | LB | Tennessee (Martin) |
| 2 | 11 | Taylor Robertson | OL | Central Florida |
| 2 | 12 | Sandro Sciortino | K | Boston College |
| 3 | 25 | Mike Labinjo | DL | Michigan State |
| 4 | 29 | Hassan Probherbs | WR | Portland State |
| 5 | 37 | Blake Machan | SB | Calgary |
| 5 | 43 | Travis Arnold | OL | Manitoba |
| 6 | 46 | Greg Schafer | OT | British Columbia |

== Preseason ==
| Week | Date | Opponent | Score | Result | Attendance | Record |
|---|---|---|---|---|---|---|
| B | June 3 | vs. BC Lions | 26–19 | Win | 25,013 | 1–0 |
| C | June 11 | at Winnipeg Blue Bombers | 30–17 | Loss | 28,222 | 1–1 |

== Regular season ==
=== Season standings ===
West Division
| Pos | Team | Pld | W | L | T | PF | PA | PD | Pts |
|---|---|---|---|---|---|---|---|---|---|
| 1 | Edmonton Eskimos (C, Q) | 18 | 13 | 5 | 0 | 569 | 414 | +155 | 26 |
| 2 | Winnipeg Blue Bombers (Q) | 18 | 11 | 7 | 0 | 514 | 487 | +27 | 22 |
| 3 | Saskatchewan Roughriders (Q) | 18 | 11 | 7 | 0 | 535 | 430 | +105 | 22 |
| 4 | BC Lions (Q) | 18 | 11 | 7 | 0 | 531 | 430 | +101 | 22 |
| 5 | Calgary Stampeders | 18 | 5 | 13 | 0 | 323 | 501 | −178 | 10 |

Source: "CFL.ca". Archived from the original on 2009-06-29.
(C) First round bye; (Q) Qualified for playoffs

=== Season schedule ===
| Week | Date | Opponent | Score | Result | Attendance | Record |
|---|---|---|---|---|---|---|
| 1 | June 16 | vs. Montreal Alouettes | 23–20 (OT) | Loss | 30,102 | 0–1 |
| 2 | June 26 | at Edmonton Eskimos | 34–24 | Loss | 30,568 | 0–2 |
| 3 | July 1 | vs. Ottawa Renegades | 32–12 | Win | 32,028 | 1–2 |
| 4 | July 10 | at Hamilton Tiger-Cats | 17–11 | Win | 15,193 | 2–2 |
| 5 | July 19 | at Montreal Alouettes | 36–25 | Loss | 20,202 | 2–3 |
| 6 | July 26 | vs. Toronto Argonauts | 41–24 | Loss | 30,976 | 2–4 |
| 7 | August 1 | vs. Saskatchewan Roughriders | 27–11 | Loss | 34,260 | 2–5 |
| 8 | August 8 | at BC Lions | 48–4 | Loss | 24,222 | 2–6 |
| 9 | August 16 | vs. BC Lions | 30–7 | Loss | 30,217 | 2–7 |
| 10 | August 22 | at Winnipeg Blue Bombers | 52–17 | Loss | 28,240 | 2–8 |
| 11 | September 1 | vs. Edmonton Eskimos | 28–22 | Win | 36,251 | 3–8 |
| 12 | September 6 | at Edmonton Eskimos | 38–0 | Loss | 62,444 | 3–9 |
| 13 | September 14 | vs. Winnipeg Blue Bombers | 21–19 | Win | 29,432 | 4–9 |
| 14 | Bye | | | | | 4–9 |
| 15 | September 26 | at Ottawa Renegades | 26–21 | Loss | 23,212 | 4–10 |
| 16 | October 3 | vs. Hamilton Tiger-Cats | 32–12 | Win | 32,052 | 5–10 |
| 17 | October 13 | at Saskatchewan Roughriders | 24–22 | Loss | 43,613 | 5–11 |
| 18 | October 19 | vs. Saskatchewan Roughriders | 34–6 | Loss | 34,287 | 5–12 |
| 19 | October 24 | at Toronto Argonauts | 13–12 | Loss | 18,223 | 5–13 |

== Roster ==
2003 Calgary Stampeders final roster
| Quarterbacks: 1 Marcus Crandell; 14 Cory Paus; 12 Keith Smith; Running backs: 4 Scott Deibert; 24 Saladin McCullough; 35 Scott Regimbald; Receivers: 88 Andre Arlain; 82 Don Blair; 89 James Hundon; 19 Mike Juhasz; 80 Darnell McDonald; 86 Wane McGarity; 6 Kamau Peterson | Offensive linemen: 67 Jamie Crysdale C; 50 Jay McNeil G; 63 Steve Morley T; 64 Jeff Pilon T; 65 Taylor Robertson G/T; 62 Bobby Singh G; Defensive linemen: 99 Kai Ellis DE; 76 Joe Fleming DT; 91 Demetrious Maxie DE; 92 Sheldon Napastuk DT; 98 Antwone Young DE; Special teams: 13 Mark McLoughlin K; 97 Duncan O'Mahony P/K | Linebackers: 30 Charles Assmann LS; 45 Michel Dupuis; 39 Willie Fells; 35 Otis Floyd; 90 Aries Monroe; 38 George White; Defensive backs: 23 Joey Boese; 17 Terrence Carroll; 36 Danny Derricott; 29 William Fields; 26 Anthony Malbrough; 3 Kelly Malveaux; 27 Matt McKnight; 2 Davis Sanchez; 15 Sam Young | Injured list: 74 Melvin Bradley DT; 56 Marc Calixte LB; 60 Samir Chahine G; 68 Freddie Childress T; 83 Albert Connell WR; 7 Kevin Feterik QB; 54 David Heasman G; 9 Aldi Henry DB; 51 Alondra Johnson LB; 31 Wes Lysack DB; 8 Hassan Probherbs DB; 96 Garrett Smith DT; Italics indicate International player |

== Awards and records ==
=== 2003 CFL All-Stars ===
- DT – Joe Fleming
