= 2004 Toronto Argonauts season =

CFL team season

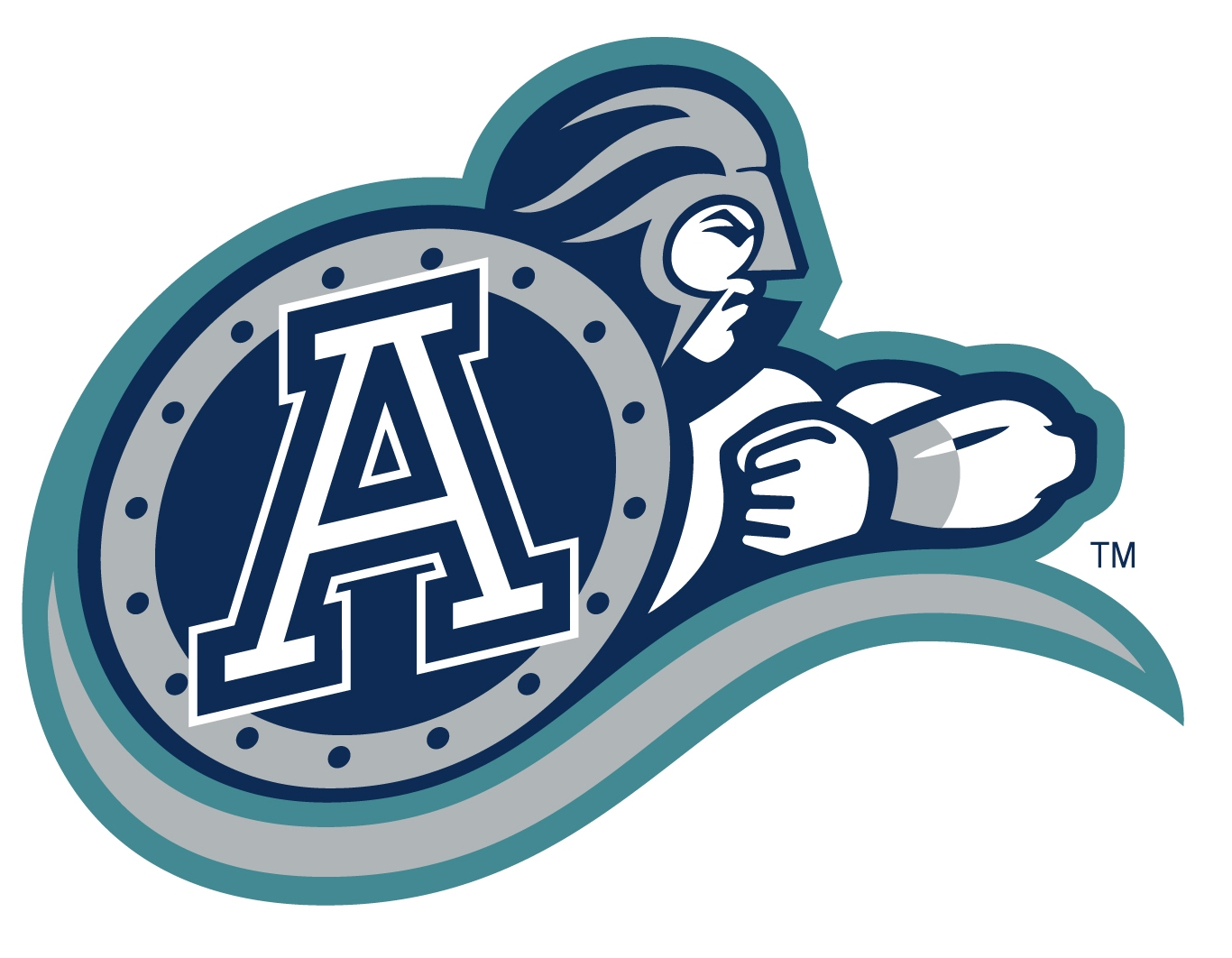
- General manager: Adam Rita
- Head coach: Michael "Pinball" Clemons
- Home stadium: SkyDome

Results
- Record: 10–7–1
- Division place: 2nd, East
- Playoffs: Won Grey Cup

Uniform

The 2004 Toronto Argonauts season was the 115th season for the professional Canadian football team since the franchise's inception in 1873. The team finished in second place in the East Division with a 10–7–1 record and qualified for the playoffs for the third consecutive year. The Argonauts defeated the Hamilton Tiger-Cats in the East Semi-Final and then won the Eastern Final against the Montreal Alouettes. Toronto faced the BC Lions in the 92nd Grey Cup and won their 15th Grey Cup championship by a score of 27–19.

== Offseason ==
=== CFL draft ===
Rd	Pick	Player	Position	School
1	4	Mark Moroz	OL	Wake Forest
1	6	Jean-Fredric Tremblay	WR	Laval
4	30	Frank Hoffmann	DL	York
5	39	Mike Mahoney	LB	McGill
6	48	Brandan Mahoney	WR	Simon Fraser

=== Preseason ===
Week	Date	Opponent	Location	Final score	Attendance	Record
A	May 30	@ Tiger-Cats	Ivor Wynne Stadium	W 33 – 10	22,342	1–0
B	June 5	Tiger-Cats	SkyDome	W 31 – 23	11,214	2–0
C	Bye					

== Regular season ==
=== Season standings ===
East Division
Pos	Team	Pld	W	L	T	PF	PA	PD	Pts
1	Montreal Alouettes (C, Q)	18	14	4	0	584	371	+213	28
2	Toronto Argonauts (Q)	18	10	7	1	422	414	+8	21
3	Hamilton Tiger-Cats (Q)	18	9	8	1	455	542	−87	19
4	Ottawa Renegades	18	5	13	0	401	560	−159	10

Source: "2004 Regular Season Standings". Archived from the original on 2011-11-10.
(C) First round bye; (Q) Qualified for playoffs

=== Regular season ===
Week	Date	Opponent	Location	Final score	Attendance	Record
1	June 15	Roughriders	SkyDome	W 21 – 10	26,821	1–0–0
2	June 24	@ Renegades	Frank Clair Stadium	L 20 – 10	20,241	1–1–0
3	July 3	Alouettes	SkyDome	L 19 – 9	23,923	1–2–0
4	July 10	@ Tiger-Cats	Ivor Wynne Stadium	W 34 – 6	27,664	2–2–0
5	July 16	@ Roughriders	Taylor Field	W 17 – 12	22,340	3–2–0
6	July 21	Renegades	SkyDome	W 28 – 25	24,209	4–2–0
7	Bye					
8	August 8	Eskimos	SkyDome	W 39 – 14	23,897	5–2–0
9	August 12	@ Alouettes	Molson Stadium	L 22 – 10	20,202	5–3–0
10	August 17	Blue Bombers	SkyDome	W 14 – 6	24,246	6–3–0
11	August 27	@ Lions	BC Place Stadium	L 31 – 10	29,484	6–4–0
12	September 6	@ Tiger-Cats	Ivor Wynne Stadium	T 30 – 30 (2OT)	29,170	6–4–1
13	Bye					
14	September 18	@ Blue Bombers	Canad Inns Stadium	L 44 – 34	24,855	6–5–1
15	September 25	@ Eskimos	Commonwealth Stadium	W 26 – 17	41,113	7–5–1
16	September 29	Stampeders	SkyDome	W 49 – 24	22,429	8–5–1
17	October 11	Lions	SkyDome	W 22 – 16	25,212	9–5–1
18	October 16	@ Stampeders	McMahon Stadium	L 29 – 11	30,082	9–6–1
19	October 21	Tiger-Cats	SkyDome	W 38 – 31	30,369	10–6–1
20	October 28	Alouettes	SkyDome	L 58 – 20	31,212	10–7–1

== Postseason ==
Round	Date	Opponent	Location	Final score	Attendance
East Semi-Final	November 5	Tiger-Cats	SkyDome	W 24–6	37,835
East Final	November 14	@ Alouettes	Olympic Stadium	W 26–18	51,296
Grey Cup	November 21	Lions	Frank Clair Stadium	W 27–19	51,242

=== Grey Cup ===
November 21 @ Frank Clair Stadium (Attendance: 51,242)

Team	Q1	Q2	Q3	Q4	Total
Toronto Argonauts	0	17	7	3	27
BC Lions	7	3	3	6	19

Toronto Argonauts (27) – TDs, Damon Allen (2), Robert Baker; FGs Noel Prefontaine (2); cons., Prefontaine (3).

BC Lions (19) – TDs, Jason Clermont, Dave Dickenson; FGs Duncan O'Mahony (2); cons. O'Mahony (1).

First quarter
BC—TD Clermont 12-yard pass from Dickenson (O'Mahony convert) 4:07

Second quarter
TOR—FG Prefontaine 27-yard field goal 7:40
TOR—TD Allen 1-yard run (Prefontaine convert) 12:22
BC—FG O'Mahony 42-yard field goal 13:13
TOR—TD Baker 23-yard pass from Allen (Prefontaine convert) 14:37

Third quarter
TOR—TD Allen 1-yard run (Prefontaine convert) 4:45
BC—FG O'Mahony 36-yard field goal 9:16

Fourth quarter
BC—TD Dickenson 7-yard run (convert failed) 6:06
TOR—FG Prefontaine 16-yard field goal 12:19

== Roster ==
2004 Toronto Argonauts final roster
Quarterbacks: 9 Damon Allen; 7 Michael Bishop; 16 Romaro Miller; Running backs: 20 John Avery; 33 Jeff Johnson; 11 John Williams; Receivers: 88 Robert Baker; 5 Arland Bruce; 15 Tony Miles; 77 Michael Palmer; 18 R. Jay Soward; 4 Andre Talbot	Offensive linemen: 65 Sandy Annunziata G; 67 John Feugill T; 56 Chad Folk C; 62 Jonathan Landon T; 59 Mike Mihelic G; 66 Jude St. John G; 69 Bernard Williams T; Defensive linemen: 97 Jonathan Brown DE; 92 Noah Cantor DT; 95 Eric England DT; 93 Gabe Robinson DE; 90 Chuck Walsh DE/DT; Special teams: 1 Noel Prefontaine K/P	Linebackers: 35 Kevin Eiben; 2 Michael Fletcher; 36 Ray Mariuz; 50 Mike O'Shea; 45 Randy Srochenski; Defensive backs: 10 Antonious Bonner; 6 Mike Crumb; 8 Chris Hardy P; 13 Clifford Ivory; 23 Bashir Levingston; 12 Adrion Smith; 21 Orlondo Steinauer; 30 Kenny Wheaton; 32 Chuck Winters; 26 Jordan Younger	Injured list: 38 Kris Aiken DB; 24 Raphaol Ball DB; 68 Dave Costa T; 34 Skip Hicks RB; 19 Scott Krause QB; 94 Arnold Miller DE; 64 Mark Moroz G; 3 Andre Rison WR; 29 Hurley Tarver DB; 98 Marvin Thomas DE; 82 J.F. Tremblay WR; Italics indicate International player

== Awards and records ==
=== 2004 CFL All-Stars ===
- Noel Prefontaine, P – CFL All-Star
- Noah Cantor, DT – CFL All-Star
- Kevin Eiben, LB – CFL All-Star
- Clifford Ivory, DB – CFL All-Star
- Orlondo Steinauer, DS – CFL All-Star

=== Eastern Division All-Star Selections ===
- Noel Prefontaine, K/P – CFL Eastern All-Star
- Bashir Levingston, ST – CFL Eastern All-Star
- Noah Cantor, DT – CFL Eastern All-Star
- Kevin Eiben, LB – CFL Eastern All-Star
- Clifford Ivory, DB – CFL Eastern All-Star
- Orlondo Steinauer, DS – CFL Eastern All-Star
