= 2004 Montreal Alouettes season =

Canadian football team season

- Head coach: Don Matthews
- Home stadium: Molson Stadium

Results
- Record: 14–4
- Division place: 1st, East
- Playoffs: Lost East Final

Uniform

The 2004 Montreal Alouettes finished in first place in the Canadian Football League (CFL) East Division with a franchise record of 14–4. The Alouettes appeared in the East Division final, but lost quarterback Anthony Calvillo to injury during the game. With backup quarterback Ted White filling in for Calvillo for the remainder of the game, the Alouettes lost to the Toronto Argonauts.

== Offseason ==
=== CFL draft ===
Round	Pick	Player	Position	School/Club team
1	8	Alain Kashama	DL	Michigan
2	15	Ryan Jeffery	OL	Wilfrid Laurier
3	21	Josh Bourke	OL	Grand Valley State
3	25	O'Neil Wilson	WR	Connecticut
4	34	Rudy Hage	DE	Concordia
6	49	Landon White	DB	Alberta
6	51	Oliver Manigat	DB	Wilfrid Laurier

== Preseason ==
Week	Date	Opponent	Venue	Score	Result	Attendance	Record
B	June 3	at Ottawa Renegades	Frank Clair Stadium	28–24	Loss	21,542	0–1
C	June 9	Ottawa Renegades	Molson Stadium	38–10	Win	19,542	1–1

== Regular season ==
=== Season standings ===
East Division
Pos	Team	Pld	W	L	T	PF	PA	PD	Pts
1	Montreal Alouettes (C, Q)	18	14	4	0	584	371	+213	28
2	Toronto Argonauts (Q)	18	10	7	1	422	414	+8	21
3	Hamilton Tiger-Cats (Q)	18	9	8	1	455	542	−87	19
4	Ottawa Renegades	18	5	13	0	401	560	−159	10

Source: "2004 Regular Season Standings". Archived from the original on 2011-11-10.
(C) First round bye; (Q) Qualified for playoffs

=== Season schedule ===
Week	Date	Opponent	Venue	Score	Result	Attendance	Record
1	June 19	Edmonton Eskimos	Molson Stadium	33–9	Win	20,202	1–0
2	June 27	Calgary Stampeders	McMahon Stadium	32–14	Win	30,207	2–0
3	July 3	Toronto Argonauts	SkyDome	19–9	Win	23,923	3–0
4	July 9	Ottawa Renegades	Molson Stadium	46–22	Win	20,202	4–0
5	July 15	Calgary Stampeders	Molson Stadium	42–23	Win	20,202	5–0
6	July 23	Hamilton Tiger-Cats	Ivor Wynne Stadium	34–13	Win	26,301	6–0
7	July 29	BC Lions	BC Place Stadium	32–9	Loss	23,788	6–1
8	Aug 5	Saskatchewan Roughriders	Molson Stadium	24–20	Win	20,202	7–1
9	Aug 12	Toronto Argonauts	Molson Stadium	22–10	Win	20,202	8–1
10	Bye						
11	Aug 26	Winnipeg Blue Bombers	Canad Inns Stadium	29–13	Win	22,826	9–1
12	Sept 3	Ottawa Renegades	Frank Clair Stadium	23–16	Win	24,639	10–1
13	Sept 12	Hamilton Tiger-Cats	Molson Stadium	47–18	Win	20,202	11–1
14	Bye						
15	Sept 25	Winnipeg Blue Bombers	Molson Stadium	47–25	Win	20,202	12–1
16	Oct 2	Saskatchewan Roughriders	Taylor Field	35–19	Loss	23,692	12–2
17	Oct 11	Edmonton Eskimos	Commonwealth Stadium	39–19	Loss	37,708	12–3
18	Oct 17	BC Lions	Molson Stadium	32–29	Loss	20,202	12–4
19	Oct 23	Ottawa Renegades	Olympic Stadium	52–21	Win	53,302	13–4
20	Oct 28	Toronto Argonauts	SkyDome	58–20	Win	31,212	14–4

== Roster ==
2004 Montreal Alouettes final roster
Quarterbacks: 1 Tavares Bolden; 13 Anthony Calvillo; 7 Ted White; Running backs: 5 Éric Lapointe; 32 Jonas Lewis; Receivers: 87 Thyron Anderson; 86 Ben Cahoon; 82 Kwame Cavil; 80 Jeremaine Copeland; 3 Sylvain Girard; 16 Ezra Landry; 88 Dave Stala K/P; 10 O'Neil Wilson	Offensive linemen: 68 Bryan Chiu C; 57 Scott Flory G; 61 Luke Fritz T; 64 Sherko Haji-Rasouli G/T; 65 Paul Lambert G; 53 Uzooma Okeke T; Defensive linemen: 94 Robert Brown DE; 75 Ed Philion DT; 96 Teto Simpson DT; 58 Anwar Stewart DE; Special teams: 11 Matt Kellett K/P; 17 Mark Mariscal K/P	Linebackers: 30 Michael Botterill; 40 Jason Congdon; 4 Patrick Dorvélus; 21 Ryan Folk; 19 Philippe Girard; 44 Kevin Johnson; 26 Khari Samuel; Defensive backs: 25 Duane Butler; 22 Almondo Curry; 8 Reggie Durden; 23 Richard Karikari; 27 Kelly Malveaux; 31 Barron Miles; 2 Davis Sanchez; 38 Tim Strickland	Injured list: 6 Autry Denson RB; 51 Aaron Fiacconi C; 66 Neal Fort T; 35 Stéphane Fortin DB; 33 Bruno Heppell FB; 34 D. J. Johnson DB; 0 Courtney Ledyard LB; 18 Will Loftus DB; 54 Marc Megna DE; -- Ell Roberson QB; 81 Kerry Watkins WR; Italics indicate International player

== Playoffs ==
=== Scotiabank East Final ===
Team	Q1	Q2	Q3	Q4	Total
Toronto Argonauts	?	?	?	?	26
Montreal Alouettes	?	?	?	?	18

== Awards ==
=== 2004 CFL All-Star Selections ===
- Ben Cahoon – Slotback
- Uzooma Okeke – Offensive Tackle
- Paul Lambert – Offensive Guard
- Bryan Chiu – Centre
- Anwar Stewart – Defensive End
- Almondo Curry – Cornerback

=== 2004 CFL Eastern All-Star Selections ===
- Anthony Calvillo – Quarterback
- Ben cahoon – Slotback
- Jeremaine Copeland – Slotback
- Kwame Cavil – Wide Receiver
- Uzooma okeke – Offensive Tackle
- Scott Flory – Offensive Guard
- Paul lambert – Offensive Guard
- Bryan chiu – Centre
- Anwar stewart – Defensive End
- Ed Philion – Defensive Tackle
- Kevin Johnson – Linebacker
- Tim Strickland – Linebacker
- Kelly Malveaux – Defensive Back
- Almondo curry – Cornerback
- Davis Sanchez – Cornerback
