= 2004 Saskatchewan Roughriders season =

CFL team season

- General manager: Roy Shivers
- Head coach: Danny Barrett
- Home stadium: Taylor Field

Results
- Record: 9–9
- Division place: 3rd, West
- Playoffs: Lost West Final
- Team MOP: Kenton Keith
- Team MOC: Jason French
- Team MOR: Santino Hall

Uniform

The 2004 Saskatchewan Roughriders finished in third place in the West Division with a 9–9 record. They defeated the Edmonton Eskimos in the West Semi-Final, but lost the West Final to the BC Lions in overtime.

== Offseason ==
=== CFL draft ===
Round	Pick	Player	Position	School/Club team
1	6	Ducarmel Augustin	Fullback	Villanova
3	23	Walter Spencer	Defensive back	Indianapolis
4	31	Luc Mullinder	Defensive end	Michigan State
4	32	Ryan Strong	Offensive lineman	Wayne State
5	41	Craig Zimmer	Linebacker	Regina

=== Preseason ===
Week	Date	Opponent	Score	Result
A	Sun, May 30	vs. Edmonton Eskimos	27–17	Win
B	Sat, June 5	at BC Lions	24–14	Win

== Regular season ==
=== Season standings ===
West Division
Pos	Team	Pld	W	L	T	PF	PA	PD	Pts
1	BC Lions (C, Q)	18	13	5	0	584	436	+148	26
2	Edmonton Eskimos (Q)	18	9	9	0	532	472	+60	18
3	Saskatchewan Roughriders (Q)	18	9	9	0	476	444	+32	18
4	Winnipeg Blue Bombers	18	7	11	0	448	507	−59	14
5	Calgary Stampeders	18	4	14	0	396	522	−126	8

Source: "2004 Regular Season Standings". Archived from the original on 2011-11-10.
(C) First round bye; (Q) Qualified for playoffs

The 2 game total point regular season series between Edmonton and Saskatchewan finished as a tie (47-47). Edmonton ultimately finished ahead of Saskatchewan in the standings because Edmonton had a better record versus Western opponents (6-4) than Saskatchewan did (4-6).

=== Season schedule ===
Week	Date	Opponent	Score	Result	Attendance	Record
1	Tues, June 15	at Toronto Argonauts	21–10	Loss	26,821	0–1
1	Sun, June 20	vs. Calgary Stampeders	33–10	Loss	21,119	0–2
2	Bye					
3	Fri, July 2	vs. BC Lions	42–29	Win	21,605	1–2
4	Thurs, July 8	at Winnipeg Blue Bombers	32–15	Loss	22,059	1–3
5	Fri, July 16	vs. Toronto Argonauts	17–12	Loss	22,340	1–4
6	Sat, July 24	at Calgary Stampeders	40–21	Win	35,651	2–4
7	Sat, July 31	vs. Hamilton Tiger-Cats	33–24	Win	23,348	3–4
8	Thurs, Aug 5	at Montreal Alouettes	24–20	Loss	20,202	3–5
9	Sat, Aug 14	vs. Calgary Stampeders	46–16	Win	26,228	4–5
10	Fri, Aug 20	at Edmonton Eskimos	31–7	Loss	42,399	4–6
11	Bye					
12	Sun, Sept 5	vs. Winnipeg Blue Bombers	17–4	Loss	30,220	4–7
13	Sun, Sept 12	at Winnipeg Blue Bombers	27–24	Loss	27,160	4–8
14	Sun, Sept 19	at Hamilton Tiger-Cats	32–30	Win	27,983	5–8
15	Sun, Sept 26	vs. Ottawa Renegades	36–22	Win	24,410	6–8
16	Sat, Oct 2	vs. Montreal Alouettes	35–19	Win	23,692	7–8
17	Sat, Oct 9	at Ottawa Renegades	32–25	Win	23,833	8–8
18	Sun, Oct 17	vs. Edmonton Eskimos	40–16	Win	30,087	9–8
19	Bye					
20	Sat, Oct 30	at BC Lions	40–38	Loss	32,402	9–9

# Games played with primary home uniforms.
# Games played with primary white uniforms.
# Games played with black uniforms.

== Roster ==
2004 Saskatchewan Roughriders final roster
Quarterbacks: 1 Henry Burris; 17 Dennis Gile; 15 Nealon Greene; Running backs: 6 Ducarmel Augustin; 19 Corey Holmes; 32 Neal Hughes; 28 Kenton Keith; 33 Chris Szarka; Receivers: 85 Karsten Bailey; 88 Matt Dominguez; 87 Jason French; 2 Corey Grant; 84 Elijah Thurmon	Offensive linemen: 69 Freddie Childress G/T; 59 Jocelyn Frenette C/G; 68 Andrew Greene G; 66 Rob Lazeo G; 60 Gene Makowsky T; 54 Jeremy O'Day C; 53 Charles Thomas T; Defensive linemen: 92 Marcus Adams DE; 98 Nathan Davis DT; 79 Terrell Jurineack DE; 96 Scott Schultz DT; Special teams: 4 Paul McCallum K/P	Linebackers: 7 Daved Benefield; 9 Reggie Hunt; 51 Alondra Johnson; 39 Mike McCullough; 48 Trevis Smith; 41 Walter Spencer; Defensive backs: 5 Davin Bush; 29 Eddie Davis; 11 Darnell Edwards; 26 Scott Gordon; 18 Santino Hall; 38 Dennis Mavrin; 24 Jackie Mitchell; 3 Omarr Morgan; 20 Kennedy Nkeyasen	Injured list: 97 Lamont Bryant DE; 12 Ian Butler QB; 8 Lawrence Deck DB; 77 Dwan Epps DE; 52 Donald Heaven G/T; 1 LaDouphyous McCalla DB; 25 Saladin McCullough RB; 83 Travis Moore WR; 89 Jamel Richardson WR; 99 Wayne Weathers DE; Italics indicate American player

== Awards and records ==
- CFL's Most Outstanding Offensive Lineman Award – Gene Makowsky

=== CFL All-Star Selections ===
- Eddie Davis, Defensive Back
- Nate Davis, Defensive Tackle
- Andrew Greene, Offensive Guard
- Gene Makowsky, Offensive Tackle

=== Western All-Star Selections ===
- Eddie Davis, Defensive Back
- Nate Davis, Defensive Tackle
- Andrew Greene, Offensive Guard
- Reggie Hunt, Linebacker
- Kenton Keith, Running Back
- Gene Makowsky, Offensive Tackle

== Playoffs ==
=== West Semi-Final ===
Team	Q1	Q2	Q3	Q4	Total
Saskatchewan Roughriders	0	7	0	7	14
Edmonton Eskimos	0	3	2	1	6

=== West Final ===
Team	Q1	Q2	Q3	Q4	OT	Total
Saskatchewan Roughriders	7	7	0	10	1	25
BC Lions	7	0	7	10	3	27
