= 2004 Hamilton Tiger-Cats season =

Season of Canadian Football League team the Hamilton Tiger-Cats

- Head coach: Greg Marshall
- Home stadium: Ivor Wynne Stadium

Results
- Record: 9–8–1
- Division place: 3rd, East
- Playoffs: Lost East Semi-Final
- Team MOP: Troy Davis
- Team MOC: Mike Morreale
- Team MOR: Wayne Smith

Uniform

The 2004 Hamilton Tiger-Cats season was the 47th season for the team in the Canadian Football League (CFL) and their 55th overall. The Tiger-Cats finished in third place in the East Division with a 9–8–1 record, which surprised many as they had gone 1–17 the year before. They played in the East Semi-Final against the Toronto Argonauts, but lost 24–6.

== Offseason ==
=== CFL draft ===
Rd	Pick	Player	Position	School
1	1	Wayne Smith	OL	Appalachian State
2	14	Marwan Hage	OL	Colorado
3	18	Sean Kent	OL	Regina
4	27	Connor Healey	DB	Wilfrid Laurier
5	36	Anthony Mason	OL	Guelph
6	45	Justin Shakell	DL	Wilfrid Laurier

== Preseason ==
Week	Date	Opponent	Score	Result	Attendance	Record
A	May 30	Toronto Argonauts	33–10	Loss	22,342	0–1
B	June 9	at Toronto Argonauts	31–23	Loss	11,214	0–2

== Regular season ==
=== Season standings ===
East Division
Team	GP	W	L	T	PF	PA	Pts	
Montreal Alouettes	18	14	4	0	584	371	28	Details
Toronto Argonauts	18	10	7	1	422	414	21	Details
Hamilton Tiger-Cats	18	9	8	1	455	542	19	Details
Ottawa Renegades	18	5	13	0	401	560	10	Details

=== Season schedule ===
Week	Date	Opponent	Score	Result	Attendance	Record
1	June 18	at BC Lions	38–36	Win	20,952	1–0
2	June 25	Winnipeg Blue Bombers	32–22	Win	25,712	2–0
3	July 4	at Calgary Stampeders	41–34	Win	26,884	3–0
4	July 10	Toronto Argonauts	34–6	Loss	27,664	3–1
5	July 17	at Edmonton Eskimos	51–30	Loss	35,728	3–2
6	July 23	Montreal Alouettes	34–14	Loss	26,301	3–3
7	July 31	at Saskatchewan Roughriders	33–24	Loss	23,348	3–4
8	Bye					
9	Aug 13	BC Lions	49–11	Loss	27,891	3–5
10	Aug 19	at Ottawa Renegades	31–19	Win	23,754	4–5
11	Aug 27	Calgary Stampeders	26–7	Win	28,850	5–5
12	Sept 6	Toronto Argonauts	30–30	Tie	29,170	5–5–1
13	Sept 12	at Montreal Alouettes	47–18	Loss	20,202	5–6–1
14	Sept 19	Saskatchewan Roughriders	32–30	Loss	27,983	5–7–1
15	Bye					
16	Oct 1	Edmonton Eskimos	30–27	Win	27,884	6–7–1
17	Oct 8	at Winnipeg Blue Bombers	20–13	Win	26,323	7–7–1
18	Oct 15	Ottawa Renegades	20–17 (OT)	Win	29,220	8–7–1
19	Oct 21	at Toronto Argonauts	34–11	Loss	30,369	8–8–1
20	Oct 30	at Ottawa Renegades	15–9	Win	25,839	9–8–1

== Postseason ==
Game	Date	Opponent	Score	Result	Attendance
East Semi-Final	Nov 5	at Toronto Argonauts	24–6	Loss	37,835

== Roster ==
2004 Hamilton Tiger-Cats final roster
Quarterbacks: 8 Marcus Brady; 14 Danny McManus; 12 Ben Sankey; Running backs: 25 Kojo Aidoo; 32 Troy Davis; 33 Julian Radlein; Receivers: 9 Archie Amerson; 82 D. J. Flick; 84 Dondre Gilliam; 18 Mike Morreale; 80 Ibrahim Tounkara; 5 Craig Yeast	Offensive linemen: 52 Tim Bakker G/T; 50 Pascal Cheron G; 51 Carl Coulter C; 68 Dave Hack T; 62 Marwan Hage C; 59 Wayne Smith G; 69 Jonta Woodard T; Defensive linemen: 78 Adriano Belli DT; 49 Tim Cheatwood DE; 91 John Macdonald DT; 53 Joe Montford DE; 94 DeVonte Peterson DE; 72 Johnny Scott DT	Linebackers: 39 Agustín Barrenechea; 55 Mat Petz; 56 Kelvin Powell; 38 Matt Robichaud; 4 Marcus Spencer; Defensive backs: 37 Sandy Beveridge; 2 Donnavan Carter; 24 Renard Cox; 27 Jason Goss; 42 Rob Hitchcock; 19 Airabin Justin; 29 Chris Martin; 26 Dedric Mathis; 6 Troy Saunders; 1 Wayne Shaw	Special teams: 17 Jamie Boreham K/P; Injured list: 2 Frantz Clarkson DB; 13 Jason Currie P/K; 64 Ryan Donnelly T; -- Jean-Francois Joncas C; 96 Hakeem Kashama DT; 85 Lamar Slade WR; 85 Ray Thomas SB; Suspended: 11 Rodney Heath DB; Italics indicate American players

== Awards and records ==
=== 2004 CFL All-Stars ===
- Tim Cheatwood – Defensive End
- D.J. Flick – Wide Receiver
- Troy Davis – Running Back
