= Frank Hoffman =

Frank Hoffman may refer to:

- Frank "Nordy" Hoffman (1909–1996), American college football player and the Sergeant at Arms of the United States Senate
- Frank Hoffmann (Canadian football) (born 1980), Canadian football guard
- Frank Hoffman (baseball), 19th-century baseball player
- Frank Sargent Hoffman (1852–1928), American philosopher
- Frank Hoffman (artist), see Harold Dow Bugbee

== See also ==
- Frank Hoffmann (disambiguation)
