= 2004 Ottawa Renegades season =

Canadian football team season

- Head coach: Joe Paopao
- Home stadium: Frank Clair Stadium

Results
- Record: 5–13
- Division place: 4th, East
- Playoffs: did not qualify

Uniform

The 2004 Ottawa Renegades season was the third season for the team in the Canadian Football League (CFL) and third overall. The Renegades finished the season with a 5–13 record and failed to make the playoffs.

== Offseason ==
=== CFL draft ===
Round	Pick	Player	Position	School
1	2	Ibrahim Khan	Offensive line	Simon Fraser
1	3	David Azzi	Wide receiver	Ottawa
2	12	Christian Leibl-Cote	Offensive line	New Hampshire
3	20	Shaun Suisham	Kicker	Bowling Green
4	29	L.P. Ladouceur	Defensive tackle	California
5	38	Matt Kirk	Defensive back	Queen's
6	47	Christian Heffernan	Slotback	Western Ontario

== Preseason ==
Game	Date	Opponent	Results		Venue	Attendance
Game	Date	Opponent	Score	Record	Venue	Attendance
B	Thu, June 3	vs. Montreal Alouettes	W 28–24	1–0	Frank Clair Stadium	21,542
C	Mon, June 9	at Montreal Alouettes	L 10–38	1–1	Molson Stadium	19,542

== Regular season ==
=== Season standings ===
East Division
Team	GP	W	L	T	PF	PA	Pts	
Montreal Alouettes	18	14	4	0	584	371	28	Details
Toronto Argonauts	18	10	7	1	422	414	21	Details
Hamilton Tiger-Cats	18	9	8	1	455	542	19	Details
Ottawa Renegades	18	5	13	0	401	560	10	Details

=== Season schedule ===
Week	Game	Date	Opponent	Results		Venue	Attendance
Week	Game	Date	Opponent	Score	Record	Venue	Attendance
1	1	Thu, June 17	at Winnipeg Blue Bombers	W 37–25	1–0	Canad Inns Stadium	22,059
2	2	Thu, June 24	vs. Toronto Argonauts	W 20–10	2–0	Frank Clair Stadium	20,241
3	3	Fri, July 2	vs. Edmonton Eskimos	W 44–15	3–0	Frank Clair Stadium	22,843
4	4	Fri, July 9	at Montreal Alouettes	L 22–46	3–1	Molson Stadium	20,202
5	5	Fri, July 16	vs. Winnipeg Blue Bombers	L 1–29	3–2	Frank Clair Stadium	21,411
6	6	Wed, July 21	at Toronto Argonauts	L 25–28	3–3	SkyDome	24,209
7	7	Thu, July 29	vs. Calgary Stampeders	W 31–30	4–3	Frank Clair Stadium	22,509
8	8	Fri, Aug 6	at BC Lions	L 27–47	4–4	BC Place Stadium	25,255
9	Bye						
10	9	Thu, Aug 19	vs. Hamilton Tiger-Cats	L 19–31	4–5	Frank Clair Stadium	23,754
11	10	Sun, Aug 29	at Edmonton Eskimos	L 16–57	4–6	Commonwealth Stadium	37,109
12	11	Fri, Sept 3	vs. Montreal Alouettes	L 16–23	4–7	Frank Clair Stadium	24,639
13	12	Sat, Sept 11	vs. BC Lions	L 13–31	4–8	Frank Clair Stadium	22,380
14	13	Fri, Sept 17	at Calgary Stampeders	W 26–24	5–8	McMahon Stadium	28,114
15	14	Sun, Sept 26	at Saskatchewan Roughriders	L 22–36	5–9	Taylor Field	24,410
16	Bye						
17	15	Sat, Oct 9	vs. Saskatchewan Roughriders	L 25–32	5–10	Frank Clair Stadium	23,833
18	16	Fri, Oct 15	at Hamilton Tiger-Cats	L 17–20	5–11	Ivor Wynne Stadium	29,220
19	18	Sat, Oct 23	at Montreal Alouettes	L 21–52	5–12	Olympic Stadium	53,302
20	18	Sat, Oct 30	vs. Hamilton Tiger-Cats	L 17–27	5–13	Frank Clair Stadium	25,839

== Roster ==
2004 Ottawa Renegades final roster
Quarterbacks: 17 Brad Banks; 10 Tyler Paopao; Running backs: 27 Raymonn Adams; 28 Sean Bennett; 30 Josh Ranek; 35 Mike Vilimek; Receivers: 86 David Azzi; 2 Demetris Bendross; 81 Curtis Jackson; 80 Yo Murphy; 83 Darryl Ray	Offensive linemen: 55 Chris Burns T; 51 Samir Chahine G; 66 Alexandre Gauthier T; 59 Mike Homewood T; 52 George Hudson C; 65 Obby Khan G; 63 Mike Sutherland G/C; Defensive linemen: 56 Keaton Cromartie DE; 93 Kai Ellis DE; 34 Tim Fleiszer DE; 99 Jerome Haywood DT; Special teams: 28 Pat Fleming P; 14 Demitris Scouras K	Linebackers: 58 Reggie Givens; 50 Steve Glenn; 33 Kyries Hebert; 6 Jason Kralt; 36 Tony White; 1 Kelly Wiltshire; Defensive backs: 9 Greg Bearman; 37 Dave Donaldson; 22 Shawn Gallant; 31 Anthony Malbrough; 29 George McCullough; 38 Syniker Taylor; 39 Gerald Vaughn	Injured list: 67 Mike Abou-Mechrek T; 88 Jason Armstead WR; 94 Charles Assmann LS; 32 Byron Capers DB; 5 Aubrey Cummings WR; 78 Roger Dunbrack DT; 85 Sherrod Gideon WR; 4 Kerry Joseph QB; 7 Darnell Kennedy QB; 19 Mike Maurer FB; 21 Ron Rogers DB; 3 Donnie Ruiz DB; 13 Sandro Sciortino K; 23 Serge Sejour DB; 8 Grayson Shillingford SB; 57 Val St. Germain G; 91 John Turntine DT; 16 Pat Woodcock WR; Italics indicate American player
