= Danny Barrett (gridiron football) =

American football player and coach (born 1961)

Houston Texans
- Title: Assistant head coach, Running backs coach

Personal information
- Born: December 18, 1961 (age 64); Boynton Beach, Florida, U.S.

Career information
- Position: Quarterback
- High school: Lake Worth (Lake Worth Beach, Florida)
- College: Cincinnati (1979–1982)
- NFL draft: 1983: undrafted

Career history

Playing
- Calgary Stampeders (1983–1985); Toronto Argonauts (1985–1988); Calgary Stampeders (1989–1991); BC Lions (1992–1993); Ottawa Rough Riders (1994–1995); Calgary Stampeders (1996); BC Lions (1998)

Coaching
- Calgary Stampeders (1997) Quarterbacks coach; BC Lions (1998–1999); Assistant offensive coordinator & quarterbacks coach 1998); Wide receivers coach (1999); Saskatchewan Roughriders (2000–2006) Head coach; Buffalo (2007–2009); Assistant head coach & quarterbacks coach (2007–2009); Interim head coach (2009); Bethune-Cookman (2010) Quarterbacks coach; UCF (2011–2015); Running backs coach (2011–2014); Quarterbacks coach (2015); Interim head coach (2015); Miami Dolphins (2016–2017) Running backs coach; Houston Texans (2018–present); Running backs coach (2018–2022); Assistant head coach & running backs coach (2023–present)

Career CFL statistics
- Passing attempts: 3,078
- Passing completions: 1,656
- Completion percentage: 53.8%
- TD–INT: 135–93
- Passing yards: 23,419

Head coaching record
- Regular season: CFL: 57–68 (.456)
- Postseason: CFL: 3–5 (.375)
- Career: CFL: 60–73 (.451); NCAA: 0–4 (.000)

Danny Barrett (born December 18, 1961) is an American professional football coach and former player who is the assistant head coach and running backs coach for the Houston Texans of the National Football League (NFL). He served as the interim head coach for the UCF Knights in 2015, and is a former Canadian Football League (CFL) quarterback. He has been the head coach of the CFL's Saskatchewan Roughriders and the running backs coach of the Miami Dolphins.

== Playing career ==
Before playing professional football with the Calgary Stampeders, Barrett was a star at the University of Cincinnati. In 1982, he co-captained the Bearcats and earned an Honorable Mention Associated Press All-American nomination. During his professional playing career, Barrett played in 163 regular season CFL games with Calgary, Toronto, B.C. and Ottawa. His career totals include; 23,419 yards passing, 1,656 completions in 3,078 attempts and 133 touchdowns passed. At one point, he held the record for most passing yards (601) in a CFL game.

In 1985, Barrett saw playing time as a slotback with the Calgary Stampeders hauling in 32 passes for 455 yards and two touchdowns. Barrett also quarterbacked the 1987 Argonauts and the 1991 Stampeders to Grey Cup appearances. In the 1991 Grey Cup, Barrett set a CFL record for completions with 34. In 1992, Barrett was selected as the Tom Pate recipient while a member of the BC Lions for his outstanding contributions to the league, his team and his community. This award was voted on by the CFLPA. In 1993, still as a member of the BC Lions, Barrett briefly held the CFL record for passing in a single game, with 601 yards, which was surpassed the following year by Matt Dunigan (713 yards).

== Coaching career ==
=== CFL ===
Barrett joined the coaching fraternity in 1997 with the Calgary Stampeders. As a first year assistant coach, Barrett was in charge of the Stampeder quarterbacks, which included Jeff Garcia, Dave Dickenson and Henry Burris. In 1998, his first season with the BC Lions, Barrett began the season on the sidelines as the quarterback coach and assistant offensive coordinator but was forced out of retirement and dressed as the Lions’ backup quarterback for 15 games. During the 1999 campaign, Barrett coached the Lions' receiver corps.

In 1999, Roy Shivers, the former director of player personnel for the Calgary Stampeders, assumed the duties of general manager of the Roughriders. Shivers hired Barrett as the head coach despite the latter's limited coaching experience. The Roughriders made football history by being the first professional team with a black general manager and head coach. The team improved during Barrett's first four seasons, largely because Shivers—an astute appraiser of football talent with many connections to U.S. college teams—recruited and signed better players. In 2003 the team ended with an 11–7 record, and lost a close Western final playoff game to the Edmonton Eskimos. The team seemed on the verge of being championship calibre.

By 2006, after three consecutive .500 seasons—capped by a humiliating 2006 Western final loss to the BC Lions by a score of 45-18—an increasing number of fans began to question the leadership provided by Shivers and Barrett, and Shivers eventually was dismissed by the team's board of directors. On August 23, 2006, the Roughriders hired Eric Tillman as general manager. After a 9-9 season, the Roughriders chose not to renew Barrett’s expired contract, with the parting of ways officially announced by Tillman on November 27, 2006. His overall record as head coach of the Roughriders was 57-68-1.

=== College football ===
On February 7, 2007, Barrett turned down an offensive coordinator position offered by the Winnipeg Blue Bombers, and opted to become the assistant head coach and quarterbacks coach at the University at Buffalo. He served in this role for three seasons. On December 13, 2009, Barrett was named Buffalo’s interim head coach following the departure of Turner Gill, who left Buffalo to take the head coaching position at the University of Kansas. His tenure as interim head coach officially ended on January 3, 2010 upon the hiring of Jeff Quinn as Buffalo’s new head coach.

Barrett spent the 2010 season as the quarterbacks coach for Bethune-Cookman University. On February 10, 2011, it was announced that Barrett would be promoted to offensive coordinator at Bethune-Cookman. However, on February 21, 2011, it was announced that Barrett chose to leave Bethune-Cookman, joining UCF as their running backs coach.

On January 14, 2015, UCFKnights.com reported that Barrett was moved from running backs coach to quarterbacks coach at UCF.

On October 25, 2015, UCFKnights.com reported that Barrett was announced as interim head coach for the remainder of the 2015 season, after George O'Leary announced his retirement from football.

=== NFL ===
On January 23, 2016, Barrett was hired by the Miami Dolphins to be their running backs coach.

On January 19, 2018, Barrett was hired by the Houston Texans to be their running backs coach. He was retained by a new coaching staff on March 10, 2021. He was also retained by the new head coaches in 2022 and 2023 adding the title of assistant head coach in 2023.

== Head coaching record ==
=== CFL ===
Team	Year	Regular season					Postseason		
Team	Year	Won	Lost	Ties	Win %	Finish	Won	Lost	Result
SSK	2000	5	12	1	.305	4th in West Division	-	-	Missed playoffs
SSK	2001	6	12	0	.333	4th in West Division	-	-	Missed playoffs
SSK	2002	8	10	0	.444	4th in West Division	0	1	Lost in Division Semifinals
SSK	2003	11	7	0	.611	3rd in West Division	1	1	Lost in West Final
SSK	2004	9	9	0	.500	3rd in West Division	1	1	Lost in West Final
SSK	2005	9	9	0	.500	4th in West Division	0	1	Lost in Division Semifinals
SSK	2006	9	9	0	.500	3rd in West Division	1	1	Lost in West Final
Total		57	68	1	.456	0 West Division; Championships	3	5	

=== College ===
Year	Team	Overall	Conference	Standing	Bowl/playoffs
UCF Knights (American Athletic Conference) (2015)
2015	UCF	0–4 (Note: Barrett was named interim head coach with four weeks remaining in the season following the resignation of George O'Leary.)	0–4	6th (Eastern)	
UCF:		0–4	0–4		
Total:		0–4			
