= Chad Rempel =

Canadian gridiron football player (born 1981)

Profile
- Position: Long snapper

Personal information
- Born: May 23, 1981 (age 45); Sherwood Park, Alberta
- Listed height: 6 ft 3 in (1.91 m)
- Listed weight: 251 lb (114 kg)

Career information
- High school: Salisbury Composite High School
- University: Saskatchewan
- CFL draft: 2004: 3rd round, 35th overall pick

Career history
- Edmonton Eskimos (2004); Winnipeg Blue Bombers (2005–2006); Toronto Argonauts (2006–2007); Hamilton Tiger-Cats (2008); Toronto Argonauts (2009–2013); Chicago Bears (2014)*; Saskatchewan Roughriders (2014); Winnipeg Blue Bombers (2015–2020); Edmonton Elks (2021)
- * Offseason or practice squad member only

Awards and highlights
- 2× Grey Cup champion (2012, 2019)
- Stats at Pro Football Reference
- Stats at CFL.ca

Chad Rempel (born May 23, 1981) is a Canadian former professional football long snapper who played in the Canadian Football League (CFL) from 2004 to 2021. He is a two-time Grey Cup champion, winning with the Toronto Argonauts in 2012 and with the Winnipeg Blue Bombers in 2019.

== University career ==
Rempel played five years of university football with the Saskatchewan Huskies football team.

== Professional career ==
Rempel was drafted in the third round, 35th overall, in the 2004 CFL draft by the Edmonton Eskimos. In 2005, Rempel joined the Winnipeg Blue Bombers as a backup wide receiver and special teams player. On June 10, 2006, Rempel was cut by the Blue Bombers in training camp. Rempel was later signed by the Toronto Argonauts on August 2, 2006.

On March 22, 2009, Rempel was a member of Lyndon Rush's bobsleigh team that won the Canadian four-man bobsleigh championship in Whistler, British Columbia.

Rempel was re-signed by the Toronto Argonauts on July 20, 2009. He was a member of the 2012 Grey Cup Champion team.

On April 7, 2014, Rempel was signed by the Chicago Bears. He was released on August 18.

On September 25, 2014, the Saskatchewan Roughriders signed Rempel to a one-year contract.

Rempel was signed by the Winnipeg Blue Bombers on May 30, 2015. He played for the Blue Bombers for five seasons and was a member of the 107th Grey Cup championship team.

On June 21, 2021, it was announced that Rempel had signed with the Edmonton Elks. He played in eight games for the Elks in 2021. He became a free agent upon the expiry of his contract on February 8, 2022.
