= Roy Shivers =

American football player and Canadian football executive (born 1941)

No. 27
- Position: Running back

Personal information
- Born: July 5, 1941 (age 85); Halley, Arkansas, U.S.
- Listed height: 5 ft 11 in (1.80 m)
- Listed weight: 200 lb (91 kg)

Career information
- High school: McClymonds (Oakland, California)
- College: Utah State
- NFL draft: 1965: 19th round, 264th overall pick
- AFL draft: 1965: Red Shirt 8th round, 62nd overall pick

Career history

Playing
- St. Louis Cardinals (1966–1972)

Coaching
- BC Lions (1983–1985) Special teams coach

Operations
- BC Lions (1986–1989) Director of player personnel; Calgary Stampeders (1990) U.S. scout; Calgary Stampeders (1991–1994) Assistant general manager; Birmingham Barracudas (1995) General manager; Calgary Stampeders (1996–1999) Assistant general manager; Saskatchewan Roughriders (2000–2006) General manager; BC Lions (2008–2013) Director of player personnel; BC Lions (2014–2017) Football operations consultant/scout

Awards and highlights
- 4× Grey Cup champion (1985, 1992, 1998, 2011)

Career NFL statistics
- Rushing yards: 680
- Rushing average: 3.9
- Receptions: 38
- Receiving yards: 400
- Total touchdowns: 15
- Stats at Pro Football Reference
- Canadian Football Hall of Fame

Roy Shivers (/ˈʃɪvərs/ SHIV-ərs; born July 5, 1941) is an American former professional football player who was a running back and Canadian football personnel administrator, most notably as the first black general manager in professional football. He was a general manager for eight seasons with the Birmingham Barracudas and Saskatchewan Roughriders of the Canadian Football League (CFL). He is a four-time Grey Cup champion as a director of player personnel and assistant general manager with the BC Lions and Calgary Stampeders (CFL) and he is a member of the Canadian Football Hall of Fame. He played for seven years in the NFL with the St. Louis Cardinals.

== His early years ==
Shivers grew up in Oakland, California, in an area known as the projects. He was one of eight children. His father moved the family to the U.S. west coast to get away from the segregated south. Shivers suffered the pains of racism at a young age when he lost out a job to be quarterback for his high school team to a white person. In West Oakland black children were only allowed to play at DeFremery Park, the park could be considered as a national landmark for it has been home some of the best athletes and activists the world has seen. Shivers went to school with Bill Russell, Frank Robinson, Curt Flood, Joe Morgan and Vada Pinson. He also grew up with the founding members of the Black Panthers, Huey Newton, Bobby Seale and David Hilliard. Shivers graduated from Oakland Technical High School in 1959, and left Oakland in 1960 to serve in the U.S. Army.

== Football playing days ==
In 1964, after serving four years in the army, Shivers went to Utah State where he became a star running back and then in 1966 was selected first round in the supplemental draft to the St. Louis Cardinals. Shivers led the Cardinals in kickoff return yards with 27 for 762 yards with one returned for a touchdown.

== Coaching and managing ==
Shivers played for seven years in the NFL before he began coaching at Merritt College in Oakland, California. He also coached at the University of Nevada, University of Hawaiʻi at Mānoa and the University of Nevada, Las Vegas (UNLV), after which he accepted a job as an assistant coach for the BC Lions in the Canadian Football League (CFL). Shivers stayed with the Lions for six seasons and rose through the ranks of the Lions' front office. In 1985, the Lions won the Grey Cup. In 1989, Shivers left for the Calgary Stampeders to become the team's U.S. scout. In 1991, he became the team's assistant general manager. Calgary won the Grey Cup in 1992. In 1995, Shivers left to become the General Manager of the expansion Birmingham Barracudas, but the team folded after one season, as did the rest of the American expansion teams. Shivers returned to Calgary in 1996, again as assistant GM. Calgary won the Grey Cup again in 1998 under head coach Wally Buono.

=== Saskatchewan Roughriders ===
Shivers became General Manager of the Saskatchewan Roughriders on December 24, 1999, with his first two years at the Riders' helm being a struggle on the field. This was to be expected as Shivers inherited a 3–15 team bereft of talent. The Riders also had 3 million dollars of debt (equal to the amount of credit the team had available to it) and was financially in dire straits. It was obvious that Shivers had to overhaul the team. Not surprisingly, there was 80% turnover in the team's 1999 starting roster. The only free agent signing with significant CFL experience was Calgary Stampeders backup quarterback Henry Burris. However, the inexperienced defence was the team's downfall as it ranked near the bottom of the league in most defensive statistical categories. The Riders posted a 5–12–1 record and missed the playoffs in their initial rebuilding year. Shivers had publicly proclaimed it would take three years to restore the Saskatchewan Roughriders to being an elite CFL team, so fans remained patient.

In year 2 of the rebuilding plan, 2001, the team got off to a rough start. Quarterback Henry Burris left the Riders and signed with the NFL's Green Bay Packers, leaving the Riders without a viable quarterback. Although team defence was markedly improved, the offense struggled. The result was another poor record (6 wins 12 losses) and another year out of the playoffs.

In 2002, Shivers made an important trade as the Roughriders' acquired Edmonton Eskimos starting quarterback Nealon Greene. While not a dominant quarterback by any means, Nealon's ability to manage the game and limit mistakes was the finishing spark that helped the Roughriders qualify for the playoffs for the first time since 1997.

Since 2002, the team has eliminated its $3 million debt, aided mostly by hosting the Grey Cup Championship Game, and by the provincial government forgiving over $1 million of debt. Nevertheless, rising attendance also played a significant part as Shivers had restored respectability to the Riders which excited the fans to come out in greater numbers. The Riders had also made the playoffs in four straight years, including two Western Division Finals in a row (2003–2004). However, in the later years of the franchise under Shivers' helm as GM, the team seemed to hit a wall or ceiling of progress, and their record stagnated instead of improving.

=== Controversies mount and stagnation ===
Mired in back to back .500 seasons (winning percentage-wise) in the years 2004 and 2005, the Riders exited the playoffs early and were seen by most fans as not living up to their expectations. Many blamed the coaching, while others pointed their fingers back to when Shivers failed to re-sign Henry Burris, who moved onto success with the rival Calgary Stampeders. This upset many Rider fans greatly, as the Calgary Stampeders ended up rebuilding rapidly, going from being a poor team in the 2004 season to a second-place finisher in the Western Conference of the CFL in season 2005. Rider fans began to voice their displeasure at the time it was taking the Riders to achieve similar goals, like finishing first or second in the West, and hosting a home play off game. This was compounded by starting quarterback, Nealon Greene, becoming increasingly inconsistent in the 2005 season, as Head Coach Danny Barrett dropped him for poor play in favour of Marcus Crandell, their back up quarterback.

Discontent grew even further with various off-the-field incidents involving the Rider players during and following the 2005 season. Trevis Smith, a starting Rider linebacker on the defence, was charged with aggravated sexual assault on October 28, 2005, accused of having repeated sexual encounters with women, one from Regina, Saskatchewan and one from British Columbia, despite knowingly being HIV-positive. It was one of the biggest controversies and embarrassments ever faced by the Roughriders in their history as it made national headlines from coast to coast. Many people pointed the finger at Shivers once again, whether right or wrong, seeing Shivers as an unwilling figure in instituting a player code of conduct. The naysayers and blamers felt Shivers should have more control over his team's behaviour. Shivers defended himself by saying what happened with Smith was a societal problem, not a football one.

Further tarnishing the team's image was the arrest of Kenton Keith, a Riders running back, for aggravated assault at a Regina nightclub, on July 12, 2006. Again, fans and citizens were upset with the Riders and Shivers, and viewed the team as becoming out of control in the community. However, even with a code of conduct for players reportedly in the works and soon forthcoming, others maintain that personal individual responsibility supersedes the control Shivers or any other Riders' management should have over the players. This is precisely the argument put forward by Shivers, as he views many of these things as societal issues, and not football ones.

=== A mixed record ===
Shivers' first major decision as the Riders' General Manager was to hire his coach Danny Barrett, a man with no prior CFL head coaching experience, or head coaching experience at any level. "The one thing I did right was (hire) Danny Barrett. He's a good young black coach. Most of our guys are young black kids. We've got a head coach our people like to play for", Shivers said.

Shivers had been known to speak his mind on issues facing his team and was not afraid to criticize players when he perceived a lack of effort or poor play. This served to motivate the team often. One situation which some fans view as controversial in Shivers' tenure is his failed negotiations with quarterback Henry Burris. Burris was a free agent in the spring of 2005 after the team narrowly lost the Western Final to the BC Lions the previous November. Burris was uncomfortable with the then back-up quarterback Nealon Greene remaining on the roster. He wanted a commitment to be named the clear starting quarterback for the Riders. Despite being offered the richest contract in club history at the time, Burris chose to accept a more lucrative offer from the Calgary Stampeders. It was never clear if Burris was actually promised the starting quarterbacking position with the Riders, as many contradictory statements were made regarding this matter. Burris also maintained that the Riders offered him less money than Shivers had publicly stated. Many point to the failure to re-sign Burris, rightly or wrongly, as being the beginning of the end for Shivers as the general manager of the Saskatchewan Roughriders.

=== Fired by the Saskatchewan Roughriders ===
Shivers was fired by the Saskatchewan Roughriders' board of directors as there was a concern that the Riders had regressed, a lack of progress was being made in signing players who would be free agents in 2007 to extensions, plus Shivers was not comfortable with the new power structure of the Riders to be implemented in 2007. At the time of his firing, the board of directors, led by the President and CEO Jim Hopson, openly expressed their displeasure at the lack of progress on thirteen soon-to-be Rider free agents not being signed for the 2007 season. In total, 30 Riders were about to enter the option years of their contracts in season 2007, with not one of them signed to future contracts halfway into the 2006 season. Many balked at this statement, however, as other CFL teams also had a large number of players going into their option years in season 2007. However, alarm bells were also being sounded as the Riders were also committed to $4.5 million in salary, well over the new $3.8 million salary cap to be instituted by the CFL in 2007.

With Shivers publicly refusing to accept forthcoming changes for the 2007 season in the Rider power structure, a clash was bound to happen. Hopson, the board of directors agreed, would be given powers that would supersede Shivers in the organization. Shivers went on record in April 2006 as saying that he would not work for Hopson as he did not trust or like him. "I told them in April that I would not work for Hopson", Shivers told the Regina Leader-Post on the Monday after being informed of the club's decision to have Hopson supersede him. "I can work with him, but I can't work for him because I dislike him and I don't trust him."

Thus, Shivers was fired from his post as general manager on August 21, 2006, with the board unanimous in its decision to fire Shivers.

During his era as Riders' general manager, Shivers lived part-time in Regina, the home of the Roughriders during the season.

=== BC Lions ===
On January 28, 2008, Shivers was hired as the director of player personnel for the BC Lions. This reunited him with Lions GM/Head Coach Wally Buono, with whom he worked during their tenure with the Calgary Stampeders in the 1990s.

On June 21, 2022, it was announced that Shivers would be enshrined in the Canadian Football Hall of Fame in the Class of 2022 as a builder.

== CFL GM record ==
Team	Year	Regular season					Postseason		
Team	Year	Won	Lost	Ties	Win %	Finish	Won	Lost	Result
BIR	1995	10	8	0	.556	3rd in South Division	0	1	Lost in semi-finals
SSK	2000	5	12	1	.305	4th in West Division	-	-	Missed playoffs
SSK	2001	6	12	0	.333	4th in West Division	-	-	Missed playoffs
SSK	2002	8	10	0	.444	4th in West Division	0	1	Lost in semi-finals
SSK	2003	11	7	0	.611	3rd in West Division	1	1	Lost in Division Finals
SSK	2004	9	9	0	.500	3rd in West Division	1	1	Lost in Division Finals
SSK	2005	9	9	0	.500	4th in West Division	0	1	Lost in semi-finals
SSK	2006	4	5	0	.500	3rd in West Division	-	-	Fired mid-season
Total		62	72	1	.463	0 Division; Championships	3	5	

== Personal ==
Shivers lives in Henderson, Nevada, with his wife, Carol Brown. They have three daughters (Rommy, Renne and Nicole), a grandson (Nicholas) and a granddaughter (Nico).
