= Neil McKinlay =

Canadian football player (born 1981)

No. 36
- Position: Linebacker

Personal information
- Born: April 25, 1981 (age 45); Langley, British Columbia, Canada
- Listed height: 6 ft 0 in (1.83 m)
- Listed weight: 220 lb (100 kg)

Career information
- University: Simon Fraser
- CFL draft: 2004: 4th round, 33rd overall pick

Career history
- 2004–2009: Winnipeg Blue Bombers
- 2011: BC Lions

Awards and highlights
- Grey Cup champion (2011); Presidents' Trophy (2003)
- Stats at CFL.ca

Neil McKinlay (born April 25, 1981) is a Canadian former professional football linebacker who played in the Canadian Football League (CFL). He was selected by the Winnipeg Blue Bombers with the 33rd pick in the fourth round of the 2004 CFL draft. McKinlay announced his retirement after six seasons with the Bombers, but was signed by the BC Lions after they had several players injured. He played CIS Football for Simon Fraser. As of 2012, he was a firefighter with the Winnipeg Fire Department.
