= Kris Aiken =

Canadian football player (born 1978)

Profile
- Position: Safety

Personal information
- Born: August 24, 1978 (age 48); Montreal, Quebec, Canada
- Listed height: 5 ft 9 in (1.75 m)
- Listed weight: 186 lb (84 kg)

Career information
- University: Western Ontario

Career history
- 2004–2005: Toronto Argonauts

Awards and highlights
- Grey Cup champion (2004)

Kristopher Aiken (born August 24, 1978) is a Canadian former professional football safety who played for the Toronto Argonauts of the Canadian Football League (CFL). He played in 14 regular season games from 2004 to 2005, recording eight tackles. Aiken is a Grey Cup champion after winning the 92nd Grey Cup with the Argonauts in 2004.
