= Frank Hoffmann =

Frank or Francis Hoffmann may refer to:

- Frank Hoffmann (actor) (1938–2022), German-Austrian actor
- Francis Hoffmann (1822–1903), clergyman and writer
- Frank Hoffmann (director), see 1954 in Luxembourg
- Frank Hoffmann (Canadian football) (born 1980), Canadian football player

== See also ==
- Frank Hoffman (disambiguation)
- Frank Simon Hofmann (1916–1989), New Zealand photographer
