= David Azzi =

Lebanese gridiron football player (born 1981)

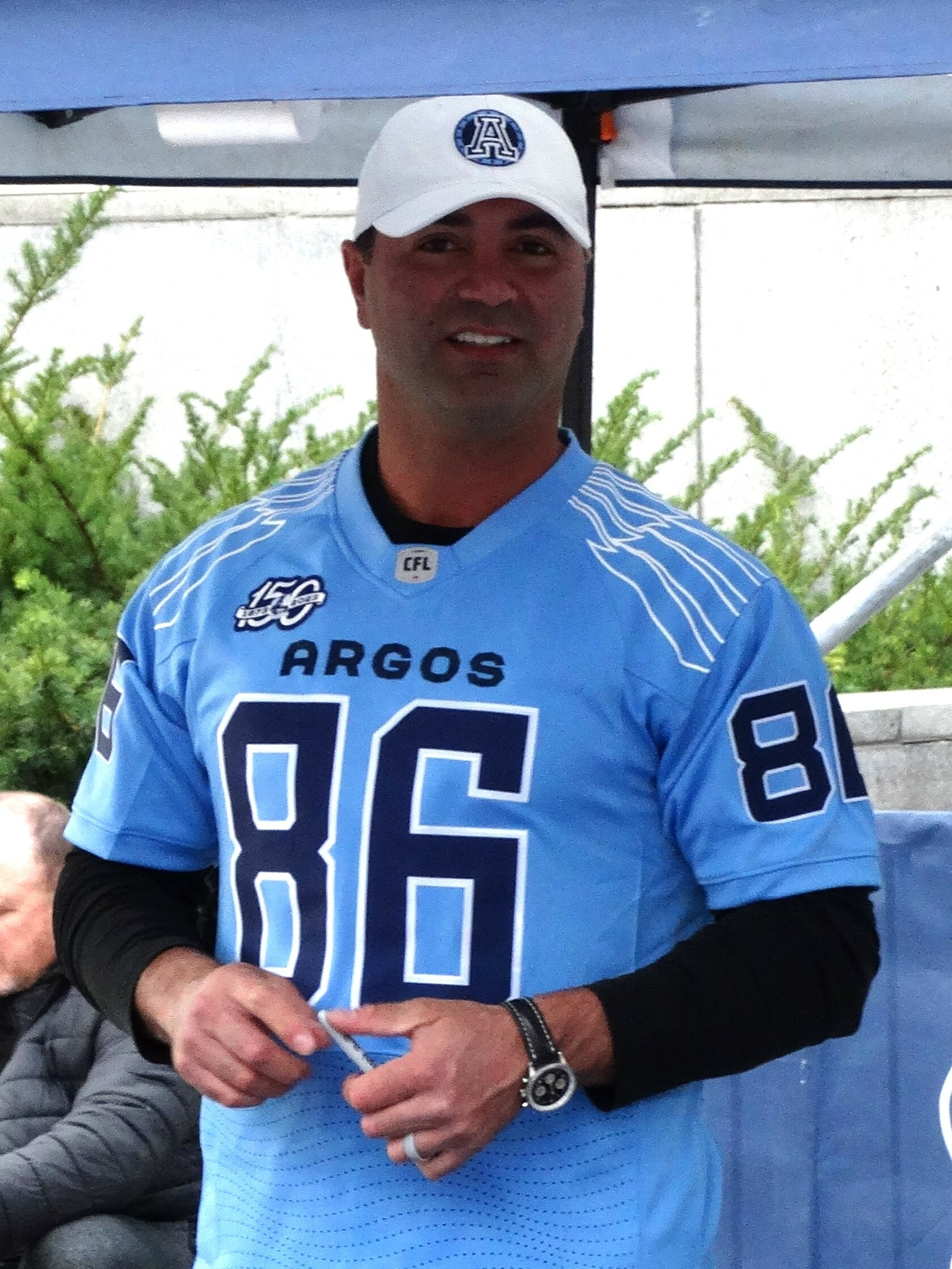
- Azzi in 2023

Profile
- Position: Wide receiver

Personal information
- Born: January 25, 1981 (age 45); Lebanon

Career information
- University: Ottawa
- CFL draft: 2004: 1st round, 3rd overall pick

Career history
- 2004: Ottawa Renegades
- 2005–2006: Toronto Argonauts
- 2007: Saskatchewan Roughriders

David Azzi (born January 25, 1981, in Lebanon) is a former professional wide receiver and slotback in the Canadian Football League (CFL).

== College career ==
In 1999 Azzi was named 1st Team All-Canadian, 1st Team All-Academic and earned a full scholarship to attend Div. 1A Bowling Green State University in the NCAA. Azzi played quarterback under Coach Urban Meyer. Later he transferred to the University of Ottawa in the CIS.

== Professional career ==
Azzi was the Ottawa Renegades' first round draft pick in the 2004 CFL draft. He then played for two years for the Toronto Argonauts. Azzi won a Grey Cup in 2007 with the Saskatchewan Roughriders.
