= Duncan O'Mahony =

Canadian football player (born 1976)

Profile
- Positions: Punter, kicker

Personal information
- Born: June 29, 1976 (age 50); Kilkenny, Ireland
- Listed height: 5 ft 10 in (1.78 m)
- Listed weight: 183 lb (83 kg)

Career information
- University: UBC
- CFL draft: 2001: 2nd round, 14th overall pick

Career history
- 2001–2003: Calgary Stampeders
- 2004–2005: BC Lions
- 2006: Winnipeg Blue Bombers*
- 2007: Calgary Stampeders
- 2008: Edmonton Eskimos*
- 2008: Winnipeg Blue Bombers
- * Offseason or practice squad member only

Awards and highlights
- Grey Cup champion (2001); CFL West All-Star (2002)
- Stats at CFL.ca (archive)

Duncan O'Mahony [oh-MAH-nee] (b. June 29, 1976) is an Irish-born former professional Canadian football punter and placekicker who played in the Canadian Football League (CFL). He kicked multiple walk-off field goals in his career.

== Early life ==
Despite being born in Ireland and having lived in Australia and Newfoundland as a child, O'Mahony is considered a non-import by the CFL, as he and his family settled in Abbotsford, British Columbia when he was a teenager. O'Mahony attended the University of British Columbia, where he set a conference record with a 52-yard field goal and was a first team CIAU all-star in 2000.

== Professional career ==
After his college career, O'Mahony joined the Calgary Stampeders for the 2001 CFL season, initially as a punter while Mark McLoughlin handled the placekicking duties. O'Mahony won the 89th Grey Cup in his rookie season with the Stampeders. After McLoughlin's first retirement after the 2002 CFL season, O'Mahony assumed kicking duties for the Stampeders as well as punting. However, a lack of accuracy put him in the fans' doghouse quickly, and McLoughlin was lured out of retirement at the end of the 2003 CFL season so O'Mahony could return to full-time punting.

O'Mahony left the Stampeders after 2003 and signed with the BC Lions, again as a placekicker and punter. O'Mahony had an adequate 2004 kicking two 40+ yard field goals in the western conference final against Saskatchewan to win the game, but his performance in 2005 was such that McLoughlin was again lured out of retirement to relieve him of his placekicking duties at the end of the year and the playoffs.

On May 4, 2006, O'Mahony was released by the Lions. On May 10, 2006, the Winnipeg Blue Bombers signed him to a one-year contract. It was expected that O'Mahony would be taking punting duties for the team in the upcoming season while possibly challenging Troy Westwood for the place kicking job.

On May 21, 2006, O'Mahony failed to show up for training camp with Winnipeg, and no one heard from him. He did make it to Calgary, but never got on a connecting flight to Winnipeg. The family issued a statement through the Blue Bombers club, saying they are having difficulty reaching him and there was a concern for his welfare. On May 22, 2006, O'Mahony's family confirmed that he had been located but due to personal issues has not yet shown up to training camp. Blue Bombers GM, Brendan Taman, has since stated that Duncan will not be playing for Winnipeg due to the nature of the situation.

On February 3, 2007, O'Mahony signed a 2-year contract with the Calgary Stampeders but played little. He was traded to the Edmonton Eskimos on May 26, 2008, in exchange for a conditional draft pick in the 2009 CFL draft but one week later, Edmonton signed Noel Prefontaine and released O'Mahony.

On June 16, 2008, he signed to return with the Blue Bombers after they had released Troy Westwood.
