= Christian Heffernan =

Canadian football player (born 1978)

No. 89
- Position: Wide receiver

Personal information
- Born: June 15, 1978 (age 48); London, Ontario, Canada
- Listed height: 6 ft 2 in (1.88 m)
- Listed weight: 196 lb (89 kg)

Career information
- University: Western
- CFL draft: 2004: 6th round, 47th overall pick

Career history
- Ottawa Renegades (2004)*; Toronto Argonauts (2005–2006)
- * Offseason or practice squad member only

Christian Heffernan (born June 15, 1978) is a Canadian former professional football wide receiver who played for the Toronto Argonauts of the Canadian Football League. Heffernan played CIS football for the Western Ontario Mustangs. Heffernan is the Senior House Advisor of Wedd's House at Upper Canada College. He also teaches mathematics and coaches the varsity football and basketball team. He also played Major League Baseball in the Atlanta Braves farm system for 4 seasons.
