= Tavares Bolden =

American gridiron football player (born 1979)

Profile
- Position: Quarterback

Personal information
- Born: June 8, 1979 (age 47); Cleveland, Ohio, U.S.
- Listed height: 6 ft 1 in (1.85 m)
- Listed weight: 205 lb (93 kg)

Career information
- High school: Glenville (Cleveland)
- College: Toledo

Career history
- 2002–2004: Montreal Alouettes

Awards and highlights
- Grey Cup champion (2002); First-team All-MAC (2000); Second-team All-MAC (2001)

Career CFL statistics
- Comp–Att: 20–33
- Passing yards: 176
- TD–INT: 1–3
- Rushing attempts: 16
- Rushing yards: 93

Tavares Bolden (born June 8, 1979) is an American former professional football quarterback who played in the Canadian Football League (CFL).

== Early life ==
Bolden was born and grew up in Cleveland, Ohio and attended Glenville High School. He did not join the school's football team until his junior year and became the Tarblooders' starting quarterback, passing for 2,800 yards and 31 touchdowns in two seasons.

== College career ==
Bolden was a member of the Toledo Rockets for five seasons, redshirting as a freshman. He became the team's starting quarterback midway through his sophomore year, becoming the first player from a Cleveland Public School to become an FBS starting quarterback since Benny Friedman in 1926. As a junior, Bolden passed for 1,597 yards with 13 touchdown passes and four interceptions while rushing for 464 yards and five touchdowns and was named first team All-Mid-American Conference (MAC). In his senior season he was named second team All-MAC after completing 214-of-319 pass attempts for a then-MAC record 67.1% completion percentage and 2,466 yards with 13 touchdowns and also rushed for 335 yards and four touchdowns. He finished his collegiate career with 5,282 passing yards and 34 touchdown passes and 1,065 rushing yards and nine touchdowns. Bolden was inducted into Toledo's Varsity ‘T’ Hall of Fame in 2015.

== Professional career ==
Bolden was signed by the Montreal Alouettes of the Canadian Football League (CFL) on April 24, 2002. Bolden played three seasons with Montreal as a backup quarterback.
