= Brendan Mahoney =

Canadian football executive

Brendan Mahoney is the assistant general manager and director of player personnel of the Calgary Stampeders of the Canadian Football League (CFL).

== Career ==
Mahoney, who grew up in Cochrane, Alberta, was a four-year starter and an all-Canadian at wide receiver at Simon Fraser University. In 2003, he set a Canada West playoff record when he caught 11 passes for 294 yards and five touchdowns against Regina.

He was selected in the 6th Round (48th Overall) in the 2004 CFL draft by the Toronto Argonauts. Mahoney was signed by the Argonauts on May 14, 2004, but was released June 10.

After spending some time on the Calgary Stampeders practice roster, Mahoney began his scouting career in 2007 as an intern in the team's personnel department. Other roles he has held with Calgary include director of Canadian scouting, scout and assistant director of football operations. In 2019, he became director of player personnel, and on December 12, 2022, added the title of assistant general manager.

During his time with the team, the Stampeders have won 3 Grey Cup championships: 2008, 2014, and 2018.
