= John Sullivan (Canadian football) =

Canadian football player (born 1981)

No. 39
- Position: Safety

Personal information
- Born: July 28, 1981 (age 45); Waterloo, Ontario, Canada
- Listed height: 6 ft 1 in (1.85 m)
- Listed weight: 210 lb (95 kg)

Career information
- College: Waterloo
- CFL draft: 2004: 6th round, 51st overall pick

Career history
- 2005–2006: Winnipeg Blue Bombers
- Stats at CFL.ca

John Sullivan (born July 28, 1981) is a Canadian former professional football player who was a safety for the Winnipeg Blue Bombers of the Canadian Football League (CFL). He was drafted by the Bombers in 2004, but he did not start playing with that team until 2005, remaining at University of Waterloo for his final year of eligibility. Sullivan obtained his degree at the University of Waterloo, and he holds the school record for most all-time tackles. He was inducted into the Hall of Fame in 2005. He was named to the OUA All-star 1st team in 2002, 2003, and 2004 and was awarded the Presidents Trophy as OUA Defensive Player of the Year in 2003. He was a CIS All Canadian for the 2003 and 2004 seasons.

Known to his teammates as "Sully" he started every football game in his five years at the University of Waterloo and was inducted into the Warrior Football Ring of Honour in 2021.

He played for the Blue Bombers as a back-up safety for three seasons 2005 and 2006 CFL seasons and 2007 season. He retired from pro football in the May 2008.

After retiring from football he became a secondary teacher and football coach. John lives with his wife Julia and two sons Jackson and Bennett in the Waterloo region.

== See also ==
- List of University of Waterloo people
