= Orlondo Steinauer =

American gridiron football player and coach (born 1973)

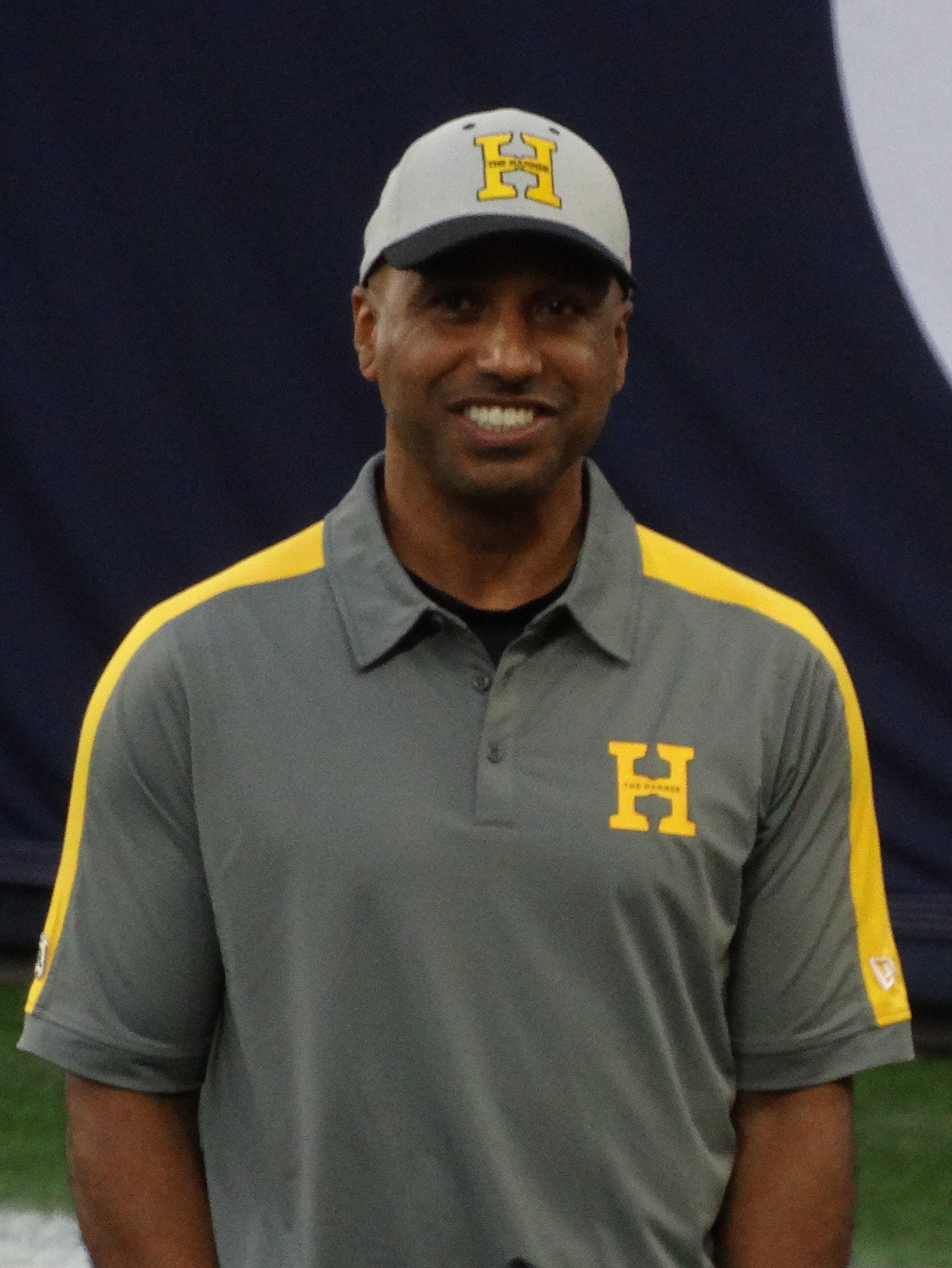
- Steinauer with the Hamilton Tiger-Cats in 2024

Hamilton Tiger-Cats
- Position: President of football operations
- Roster status: Active
- CFL status: American

Personal information
- Born: June 9, 1973 (age 53); Seattle, Washington, U.S.
- Listed height: 5 ft 11 in (1.80 m)
- Listed weight: 182 lb (83 kg)

Career information
- Position: Safety
- High school: Lynnwood
- College: Western Washington

Career history

Playing
- 1996: Ottawa Rough Riders
- 1997–2000: Hamilton Tiger-Cats
- 2001–2008: Toronto Argonauts

Coaching
- 2010–2011: Toronto Argonauts (DBC)
- 2011: Toronto Argonauts (DC)
- 2012: Toronto Argonauts (DBC)
- 2013–2016: Hamilton Tiger-Cats (DC)
- 2017: Fresno State (DC)
- 2018: Hamilton Tiger-Cats (AC)
- 2019–2023: Hamilton Tiger-Cats (HC)

Operations
- 2022–Present: Hamilton Tiger-Cats (PoFO)

Awards and highlights
- 3× Grey Cup champion (1999, 2004, 2012); 5× CFL All-Star (1998, 2002, 2003, 2004, 2007); 6× CFL East All-Star (1998, 2002, 2003, 2004, 2006, 2007); Toronto Argonauts Defensive Player of 2002; 2017 Broyles Award Nominee NCAA Fresno State University DC; 2019 CFL Coach of the Year; CFL records: Second in CFL History for All-Time Interception Return Yards; Most wins by a rookie head coach in CFL History (15)
- Stats at CFL.ca (archive)
- Canadian Football Hall of Fame (Class of 2021)

Orlondo Steinauer (born June 9, 1973) is the president of football operations for the Hamilton Tiger-Cats of the Canadian Football League (CFL). As a player, he played professional Canadian football as a safety for 13 seasons with the Ottawa Rough Riders, Hamilton Tiger-Cats and Toronto Argonauts from 1996 to 2008. He finished his career second all-time in CFL history for interception return yards with 1,178 yards. Steinauer was a two-time Grey Cup champion as a player after winning in 1999 with the Tiger-Cats and in 2004 with the Argonauts. He has also won a championship as a coach, winning the 100th Grey Cup as the defensive backs coach for the Toronto Argonauts in 2012.

== Early life ==
At Lynnwood High School in Lynnwood, Washington, Steinauer lettered in football, basketball, and baseball. He graduated in 1991.

== College career ==
Steinauer starred in football at Western Washington University and finished his career with 20 interceptions, 160 tackles, a forced fumble, and 89 punt returns for 965 yards (10.84 yards per punt ret. avg.) and a touchdown. In 1995, his final year, he was a consensus first-team All-American and the CFA Defensive Player of the Year leading the United States in pass interceptions with 10 and ranked ninth nationally with an 11.6 yards punt return average.

In 1999, he was named to Western Washington University's All-Century team and was the only player named to two first-team positions, at cornerback and punt returner.

== Professional career ==
Steinauer joined the Ottawa Rough Riders of the CFL in 1996, but saw minimal playing time prior to the team's dissolution at the end of that season. In 1997, with the Hamilton Tiger-Cats, he emerged as a defensive star, earning a spot on the East Division All-Star team. He was also a punt returner. Steinauer's performance in Hamilton (1997–1999) and Toronto (2001–2008) was well regarded; he was named a divisional All-Star six times and CFL All-Star five times.

Toronto released him on August 25, 2008, prior to the ninth game of the season. As a CFL player with more than six years experience, playing more than eight games would have guaranteed his salary for the remainder of the year.

He was inducted into the Canadian Football Hall of Fame as a player in 2021.

== Post-playing career ==
After being released by the Argonauts, he was approached by Rogers Sportsnet to work as a football analyst for their broadcasts. Steinauer says football reporters told him that as a player he would make a good broadcaster, but that he never thought about it until the opportunity presented itself. In 2009, he did analysis for Sportsnet's television broadcasts and the radio Fan 590.

== Coaching career ==
=== Toronto Argonauts ===
On February 19, 2010, Steinauer was hired by the Argonauts as their defensive backs coach. On August 4, 2011, Steinauer was promoted to defensive co-ordinator of the Argonauts after the firing of Chip Garber from that position. On December 8, 2011, new head coach Scott Milanovich announced that Steinauer would be retained as the team's defensive backs coach.

=== Hamilton Tiger-Cats ===
On January 3, 2013, Steinauer was named the defensive coordinator for the Hamilton Tiger-Cats. Steinauer coached with the Ti-Cats for four seasons. By the end of the 2016 season he was considered one of the leading candidates for a head-coaching position in the CFL.

=== Fresno State Bulldogs ===
On December 14, 2016 Steinauer announced that he would be leaving the CFL and heading south to become the defensive coordinator for the Fresno State Bulldogs.

=== Hamilton Tiger-Cats (II) ===
After one season with the Bulldogs, Steinauer returned to the CFL and Hamilton Tiger-Cats on February 22, 2018, as an assistant head coach to June Jones for the 2018 season. With the Toronto Argonauts and BC Lions both looking at Steinauer for their head coaching vacancies for the 2019 CFL season, the Tiger-Cats and Jones decided to name Steinauer as the 26th Head Coach of the Tiger-Cats on December 3, 2018. He tied the CFL record for wins by a rookie head coach as the Tiger-Cats finished with a 15 win and 3 loss record.

Due to the cancellation of the 2020 CFL season, Steinauer did not coach in 2020. In his second season, the Tiger-Cats began the season with an 0–2 record, but finished 8–4 in a pandemic-shortened season to finish second in the East. The Tiger-Cats defeated the Montreal Alouettes and Toronto Argonauts in the playoffs as Steinauer led the team to their second consecutive Grey Cup appearance. However, he suffered his second championship loss as a head coach as the Tiger-Cats lost the 108th Grey Cup game to the Winnipeg Blue Bombers. Following the season, Steinauer was named president of football operations, in addition to his duties as head coach, on December 24, 2021.

=== Head coaching record ===
Team	Year	Regular season					Postseason		
Team	Year	Won	Lost	Ties	Win %	Finish	Won	Lost	Result
HAM	2019	15	3	0	.833	1st in East Division	1	1	Lost 107th Grey Cup
HAM	2020	Season Cancelled							
HAM	2021	8	6	0	.571	2nd in East Division	2	1	Lost 108th Grey Cup
HAM	2022	8	10	0	.444	3rd in East Division	0	1	Lost in East Semi-Final
HAM	2023	8	10	0	.444	3rd in East Division	0	1	Lost in East Semi-Final
Total		39	29	0	.574	1 Division; Championship	3	4	0 Grey Cups
