= 2004 CFL draft =

Canadian football draft

General information
- Sport: Canadian football
- Date: April 28

Overview
- 53 total selections in 6 rounds
- League: CFL
- First selection: Wayne Smith, OL; Hamilton Tiger-Cats
- Most selections (7): Ottawa Renegades; Montreal Alouettes; Edmonton Eskimos; Calgary Stampeders
- Fewest selections (4): Winnipeg Blue Bombers
- CIS selections: 35
- NCAA selections: 18

The 2004 CFL draft took place on Wednesday, April 28, 2004. 53 players were chosen from among eligible players from Canadian Universities across the country, as well as Canadian players playing in the NCAA. Of the 53 draft selections, 35 players were drafted from Canadian Interuniversity Sport institutions.

== Round one ==
Pick #	CFL team	Player	Position	School
1	Hamilton Tiger-Cats	Wayne Smith	OL	Appalachian State
2	Ottawa Renegades	Ibrahim Khan	OL	Simon Fraser
3	Ottawa Renegades	David Azzi	WR	Ottawa
4	Toronto Argonauts	Mark Moroz	OL	Wake Forest
5	BC Lions	O.J. Atogwe	S	Stanford
6	Saskatchewan Roughriders	Ducamel Augustin	FB	Villanova
7	Toronto Argonauts	Jean-Fredric Tremblay	WR	Laval
8	Montreal Alouettes	Alain Kashama	DL	Michigan
9	Edmonton Eskimos	Amarpreet Sanghera	OL	British Columbia

== Round two ==
= CFL Division All-Star	= CFL All-Star	= Hall of Famer

Pick #	CFL team	Player	Position	School
10	Edmonton Eskimos	Gilles Lezi	FB	Northwestern
11	Calgary Stampeders	Tyler Lynem	DL	Calgary
12	Ottawa Renegades	Christian Leibl-Cote	OL	New Hampshire
13	BC Lions (via Toronto)	Nautyn McKay-Loescher	DE	Alabama
14	Hamilton Tiger-Cats	Marwan Hage	OL	Colorado
15	Montreal Alouettes	Ryan Jeffrey	OL	Wilfrid Laurier
16	Calgary Stampeders	Pascal Masson	DB	Laval
17	Edmonton Eskimos	Rhett McLane	OL	Saskatchewan

== Round three ==
= CFL Division All-Star	= CFL All-Star	= Hall of Famer

Pick #	CFL team	Player	Position	School
18	Hamilton Tiger-Cats	Sean Kent	OL	Regina
19	Calgary Stampeders	Jason Taylor	DE	British Columbia
20	Ottawa Renegades	Shaun Suisham	K	Bowling Green
21	Montreal Alouettes	Josh Bourke	OL	Grand Valley State
22	BC Lions	Scott Plummer	DB	Simon Fraser
23	Saskatchewan Roughriders	Walter Spencer	DB	Indianapolis
24	Winnipeg Blue Bombers	Jon Ryan	WR/K	Regina
25	Montreal Alouettes	O'Neil Wilson	WR	Connecticut
26	Edmonton Eskimos	Andrew Nowacki	WR	Murray State

== Round four ==
Pick #	CFL team	Player	Position	School
27	Hamilton Tiger-Cats	Connor Healey	DB	Wilfrid Laurier
28	Calgary Stampeders	Anthony Forgione	OL	York
29	Ottawa Renegades	L.P. Ladouceur	DT	California
30	Toronto Argonauts	Frank Hoffmann	DL	York
31	Saskatchewan Roughriders	Luc Mullinder	DE	Michigan State
32	Saskatchewan Roughriders	Ryan Strong	OL	Wayne State
33	Winnipeg Blue Bombers	Neil McKinlay	LB	Simon Fraser
34	Montreal Alouettes	Rudy Hage	DE	Concordia
35	Edmonton Eskimos	Chad Rempel	WR	Saskatchewan

== Round five ==
Pick #	CFL team	Player	Position	School
36	Hamilton Tiger-Cats	Anthony Mason	OL	Guelph
37	Calgary Stampeders	Christian Simmerling	DB	Saint Mary's
38	Ottawa Renegades	Matt Kirk	DL	Queen's
39	Toronto Argonauts	Mike Mahoney	LB	McGill
40	BC Lions	Troy Cunningham	DE	Concordia
41	Saskatchewan Roughriders	Craig Zimmer	LB	Regina
42	Calgary Stampeders	Marc Mitchell	LB	Queen's
43	Winnipeg Blue Bombers	Ryan Folk	LB	Calgary
44	Edmonton Eskimos	Martin Gagnon	DB	Laval

== Round six ==
Pick #	CFL team	Player	Position	School
45	Hamilton Tiger-Cats	Justin Shakell	DL	Wilfrid Laurier
46	Calgary Stampeders	Andrew Gallant	SB	St. Francis Xavier
47	Ottawa Renegades	Christian Heffernan	SB	Western Ontario
48	Toronto Argonauts	Brendan Mahoney	WR	Simon Fraser
49	BC Lions	Billy Palmer	TE	Notre Dame
50	Montreal Alouettes	Landon White	DB	Alberta
51	Winnipeg Blue Bombers	John Sullivan	S	Waterloo
52	Montreal Alouettes	Steven Frake	DB	Wilfrid Laurier
53	Edmonton Eskimos	David Thorne	OL	Mount Allison
