= Frank Hoffmann (Canadian football) =

Canadian football player (born 1980)

No. 58
- Position: Offensive guard

Personal information
- Born: 1980 (age 45–46)
- Listed height: 6 ft 4 in (1.93 m)
- Listed weight: 281 lb (127 kg)

Career information
- High school: Michael Power (Toronto)
- College: Temple
- University: York
- CFL draft: 2004: 4th round, 30th overall pick

Career history
- 2004: Toronto Argonauts

Awards and highlights
- Grey Cup champion (2004)

Frank Hoffmann (born 1980) is a Canadian former professional football offensive guard who played one season with the Toronto Argonauts of the Canadian Football League (CFL). He was selected by the Argonauts in the fourth round of the 2004 CFL draft. He first enrolled at Temple University before transferring to York University.

== Early life ==
Frank Hoffman was born in 1980 in Toronto, Ontario. (Note: One source says he was born on January 9, 1980, while another says May 23, 1980.) He grew up in Etobicoke. He attended Michael Power - St. Joseph High School in Toronto.

== University career ==
Hoffman received a scholarship to attend Temple University and play for the Temple Owls as a defensive lineman. He later transferred to play CIS football for the York Lions of York University in 2001. He totaled 14 tackles, one assisted tackles, and one sack in 2002. Hoffman was the captain of the West team during the CIS East–West Bowl in 2003.

== Professional career ==
Hoffman was selected by the Toronto Argonauts in the fourth round, with the 30th pick, of the 2004 CFL draft. In regards to Hoffman, Argonauts general manager Adam Rita stated "He's a big wide body. I think he can learn behind Noah [Cantor] and progress from there. We don't have anyone with his body type. Of all the defensive linemen I saw, he was the best big guy." Hoffman played in one game for the Argonauts as an offensive guard during the 2004 season. The Argonauts finished the year with a 10–7–1 record and eventually advanced to the 92nd Grey Cup, where they beat the BC Lions by a score of 27–19. He was released on June 13, 2005.

== Personal life ==
Hoffman's father was a European boxing champion.
