= Antonious Bonner =

American gridiron football player (born 1972)

No. 10
- Position: Cornerback

Personal information
- Born: November 3, 1972 (age 54); Chicago, Illinois, U.S.

Career information
- College: Mississippi

Career history
- 1995: Ottawa Rough Riders
- 1997–2006: Toronto Argonauts

Awards and highlights
- 2× Grey Cup champion (1997, 2004)
- Stats at CFL.ca (archive)

Antonious Bonner (born November 3, 1972) was a football player in the CFL for eleven years. Bonner played defensive back for the Ottawa Rough Riders and Toronto Argonauts from 1995 to 2006. He won two Grey Cup Championships (1997 and 2004) with the Argos. Bonner grew up in Greenwood Mississippi, where he starred at Greenwood High School.
