= Walter Spencer (Canadian football) =

American gridiron football player (born 1978)

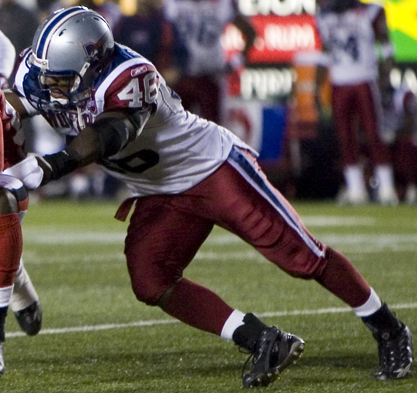
- Spencer with the Montreal Alouettes in 2007

No. 46
- Position: Linebacker

Personal information
- Born: November 11, 1978 (age 47); Detroit, Michigan, U.S.
- Listed height: 5 ft 10 in (1.78 m)
- Listed weight: 217 lb (98 kg)

Career information
- College: University of Indianapolis
- CFL draft: 2004: 3rd round, 23rd overall pick

Career history
- 2004–2005: Saskatchewan Roughriders
- 2006: Calgary Stampeders
- 2007–2011: Montreal Alouettes
- 2012: Toronto Argonauts
- 2013: Montreal Alouettes

Awards and highlights
- 2× Grey Cup champion (2009, 2012)
- Stats at CFL.ca

Walter Spencer (born November 11, 1978) is a former professional Canadian football linebacker. He was drafted by the Saskatchewan Roughriders in the third round of the 2004 CFL draft. He played college football for the Indianapolis Greyhounds.

Spencer has also played for the Calgary Stampeders and the Toronto Argonauts. Spencer is a 3 time Grey Cup Champion. Spencer was Saskatchewan Roughriders Special Teams player of the year 2004 and 2005. Spencer was Montreal Alouettes Special Teams player of the year 2007.

== Personal life ==
Spencer is the CEO/Founder of Top Player Athletic Training Facility in Windsor Ontario, where he trains athletes of all sports and abilities.

Spencer's son, Walter III, was born in July 2011.
