= Tim Cheatwood =

American gridiron football player and coach (born 1978)

No. 49
- Position: Linebacker

Personal information
- Born: November 5, 1978 (age 48); East Cleveland, Ohio, U.S.
- Listed height: 6 ft 4 in (1.93 m)
- Listed weight: 258 lb (117 kg)

Career information
- High school: Benedictine (Cleveland, Ohio)
- College: Ohio State
- NFL draft: 2002: undrafted

Career history

Playing
- Hamilton Tiger-Cats (2002–2004); Houston Texans (2005)*; Hamilton Tiger-Cats (2005–2006); Montreal Alouettes (2007)*; Edmonton Eskimos (2007); Mahoning Valley Thunder (2009); Cleveland Gladiators (2010–2012); Orlando Predators (2013); Cleveland Gladiators (2015)
- * Offseason or practice squad member only

Coaching
- Cleveland Gladiators (ASST) (2014)

Awards and highlights
- CFLPA All-Star (2003, 2004); Second-team All-Arena (2011)

Career CFL statistics as of 2007
- Tackle: 236
- Sacks: 44
- Fumble recoveries: 4
- Touchdowns: 1
- Stats at CFL.ca (archived)

Career AFL statistics
- Tackle: 116.5
- Sacks: 26.5
- Forced fumbles: 10
- Fumble recoveries: 14
- Interceptions: 2
- Stats at ArenaFan.com

Timothy Cheatwood (born November 5, 1978) is an American former professional football linebacker. He played college football at Ohio State University, and was a linebacker in the Canadian Football League (CFL) from 2002 to 2007. He then played in the AFL as a linebacker from 2010 to 2013.

Cheatwood was an CFL Eastern Division All-Star in 2003 and 2004, and he was a CFL All-Star in 2004 when he led the league with 14 sacks.
