= Nathan Davis (gridiron football) =

American gridiron football player (born 1974)

No. 99, 98, 13
- Position: Defensive tackle

Personal information
- Born: February 6, 1974 (age 52); Hartford, Connecticut, U.S.
- Listed height: 6 ft 5 in (1.96 m)
- Listed weight: 328 lb (149 kg)

Career information
- High school: Richmond (IN)
- College: Indiana
- NFL draft: 1997: 2nd round, 32nd overall pick

Career history
- Atlanta Falcons (1997); Dallas Cowboys (1998–1999); Denver Broncos (2000)*; Saskatchewan Roughriders (2001); Chicago Enforcers (2001); Saskatchewan Roughriders (2002–2006); Winnipeg Blue Bombers (2007)
- * Offseason or practice squad member only

Awards and highlights
- CFL All-Star (2004); 2× CFL West All-Star (2003, 2004); Track All-American (1995); Track All-Big Ten (1995); 2× Second-team All-Big Ten (1995, 1996)

Career NFL statistics
- Tackles: 4
- Stats at Pro Football Reference

Nathan Michael Davis (born February 6, 1974) is an American former professional football player who was a defensive tackle in the National Football League (NFL) for the Atlanta Falcons and Dallas Cowboys. He also was a member of the Saskatchewan Roughriders and Winnipeg Blue Bombers in the Canadian Football League (CFL). He played college football for the Indiana Hoosiers.

== Early life ==
Davis attended Richmond High School, where he was a two-way player at defensive end and tight end. As a senior, he posted 108 tackles, 18 sacks, 13 receptions for 220 yards and 2 touchdowns. He received second-team all-state, All-conference and defensive player of the year honors.

He won the state shot put championship as a junior and a national indoor shot put title as a senior.

== College career ==
Davis accepted a football scholarship from Indiana University, where he was a defensive end. As a junior, he recorded 60 tackles, 6 sacks and 20 tackles for loss (second in school history and 13th in the nation).

As a senior, he was limited throughout the season with a pelvic injury. He tallied 34 tackles and 4 sacks. He finished his career with 133 tackles, 37 tackles for loss (third in school history) and 13 sacks.

As a junior, he captured outdoor and indoor shot put titles. He also recorded a toss of 19.12 metres (62 feet 8.75 inches) at the 1996 Big Ten championships, earning a berth at the 1996 U.S. Olympic trials, where he finished tenth.

== Professional career ==
Pre-draft measurables
Height	Weight	Arm length	Hand span	Bench press
6 ft 5 1/8 in (1.96 m)	312 lb (142 kg)	34 1/8 in (0.87 m)	9 3/4 in (0.25 m)	27 reps

=== Atlanta Falcons ===
Davis was selected by the Atlanta Falcons in the second round (32nd overall) of the 1997 NFL draft. He was declared inactive in the first 12 games of the season. He played against the New Orleans Saints and Seattle Seahawks, recording one quarterback pressure. He was then declared inactive for the last 3 games.

On July 24, 1998, it was reported in the media that Davis quit the team for personal reasons. He was waived on July 29.

=== Dallas Cowboys ===
On October 5, 1998, he was signed as a free agent by the Dallas Cowboys to provide depth on the defensive line. He was declared inactive during all of the regular season and the NFC Wild Card Playoff game.

In 1999, he appeared in 4 games and had 4 tackles. On November 9, he was released to make room for Leon Lett who was being activated from a suspension.

=== Denver Broncos ===
On February 22, 2000, he signed as a free agent with the Denver Broncos. He was released on August 22.

=== Chicago Enforcers ===
In 2001, he signed with the Chicago Enforcers of the XFL. He was released on March 22.

=== Saskatchewan Roughriders ===
In July 2001, he signed with the Saskatchewan Roughriders of the Canadian Football League. He had 40 tackles, 3 sacks and one interception.

In 2006, he collected 20 tackles and 4 sacks in 17 games. He was cut on February 1, 2007.

=== Winnipeg Blue Bombers ===
On March 19, 2007, he signed with the Winnipeg Blue Bombers. He was released after playing in one game on July 15.

== Personal life ==
His cousin is Barry Larkin, who is a member of the National Baseball Hall of Fame. Davis was nicknamed Big Nate, and was known for his dreadlocks.
