= Wayne Smith (offensive lineman) =

Canadian gridiron football player (born 1979)

No. 52
- Positions: Guard, Offensive tackle

Personal information
- Born: November 17, 1979 (age 47); Etobicoke, Ontario, Canada
- Listed height: 6 ft 2 in (1.88 m)
- Listed weight: 305 lb (138 kg)

Career information
- High school: McArthur (Hollywood, Florida, U.S.)
- College: Appalachian State
- CFL draft: 2004: 1st round, 1st overall pick

Career history
- 2002: Washington Redskins*
- 2003: Denver Broncos*
- 2004–2006: Hamilton Tiger-Cats
- 2007–2010: Saskatchewan Roughriders
- 2011: Hamilton Tiger-Cats
- 2012–2017: Toronto Argonauts
- * Offseason or practice squad member only

Awards and highlights
- 2× Grey Cup champion (2007, 2012); CFLPA Pro Player All Star Team (2008)
- Stats at CFL.ca

Wayne Anthony Smith (born November 17, 1979) is a Canadian former professional football offensive lineman who played in the Canadian Football League (CFL) from 2004 to 2017. He was selected first overall by the Hamilton Tiger-Cats in the 2004 CFL draft and spent four seasons over two stints with the team. Smith won a Grey Cup championship with the Saskatchewan Roughriders in 2007. He was also a member of the Toronto Argonauts of the CFL and the Washington Redskins and Denver Broncos of the National Football League (NFL). He announced his retirement in April 2017. He played college football at Appalachian State.
