= Bashir Levingston =

American gridiron football player (born 1976)

No. 24
- Position: Cornerback / Kick returner

Personal information
- Born: October 2, 1976 (age 50); Inglewood, California, U.S.
- Listed height: 5 ft 9 in (1.75 m)
- Listed weight: 180 lb (82 kg)

Career information
- High school: Seaside (CA)
- College: Eastern Washington
- NFL draft: 1999: undrafted

Career history
- New York Giants (1999–2000); → Amsterdam Admirals (2000); Toronto Argonauts (2002); Miami Dolphins (2003)*; Toronto Argonauts (2003–2007); Montreal Alouettes (2007)
- * Offseason or practice squad member only

Awards and highlights
- Grey Cup champion (2004); CFL All-Star (2003, 2004); CFL Special Teams Award (2003)
- Stats at Pro Football Reference

Bashir A. Levingston (/bəˈʃɑːr/ bə-SHAR; born October 2, 1976) is an American former professional football cornerback and kick returner who played in the National Football League (NFL) and Canadian Football League (CFL).

== College career ==
After transferring from Monterey Peninsula College, Levingston played college football at Eastern Washington University, where, as a senior, he earned seven All-American honors as a return specialist. He was also named first-team All-Big Sky Conference as a kick returner. He scored 12 touchdowns and totaled 1,597 all-purpose yards during his senior year at Eastern Washington.

Livingston also is the leader for Division I-AA and is fifth on the all-time NCAA list in punt returns averaging 20.8 yards. He broke or tied seven I-AA records including kickoff returns for a touchdown in a game (three) and season (three), kickoff return yards in a game (326), average kickoff returns in a game (65.2), yards in kickoffs and punt returns in game (349) and touchdowns on kickoffs and punt returns in a single game (three) and season (six).

== Professional career ==
=== NFL and NFL Europa ===
Levingston was originally signed by the New York Giants in 1999 and spent two years on the team. Eventually, he was released from the team and allocated to NFL Europa with the Amsterdam Admirals in 2000, where he earned All-NFL Europa honors for his contributions on special teams.

=== CFL ===
After being cut by the Edmonton Eskimos during their 2001 training camp, Levingston caught on with the Toronto Argonauts. Since being signed in 2002, Levingston has developed into one of the CFL's best kick returners, earning CFL Special Teams Player of the Week honors ten times in his career to go along with earning East Division All-Star honors in 2003 and 2004. Levingston was named the CFL's Outstanding Special Teams Player and the East Division Special Teams Player of the Year in 2003 as well. In 2004, Levingston also won a Grey Cup championship with the Toronto Argonauts.

On June 28, 2007, in a game against the BC Lions, Levingston broke a CFL record when he returned a missed field goal by Paul McCallum for a 129-yard touchdown. That record has since been tied by his then teammate Dominique Dorsey on August 2, 2007.

On August 30, 2007, Levingston was released by the Argonauts.

On November 4, 2007, Levingston was signed by the Montreal Alouettes.
