= Noah Cantor =

Canadian football player (born 1971)

No. 51, 92
- Position: Defensive tackle

Personal information
- Born: January 11, 1971 (age 55); Ottawa, Ontario, Canada
- Listed height: 6 ft 3 in (1.91 m)
- Listed weight: 265 lb (120 kg)

Career information
- College: St. Mary's

Career history
- 1995–1997: Toronto Argonauts
- 1998–2002: British Columbia Lions
- 2003–2006: Toronto Argonauts

Awards and highlights
- 4× Grey Cup champion (1996, 1997, 2000, 2004); CFL All-Star (2004); CFL East All-Star (2004)

Noah Cantor (born January 11, 1971) is a former football player in the Canadian Football League.

== Biography ==
Cantor is Jewish. Born in Ottawa, Ontario, Cantor played with the University of Saint Mary's Huskies from 1990 to 1994. He was signed as a free agent by the Toronto Argonauts on February 28, 2003. He re-signed with Toronto on February 24, 2004.

In 2006, Cantor announced his retirement from the CFL on April 13, but returned from retirement and signed a contract with Toronto on August 10. On April 17, 2007, Cantor retired for a second time from the Argonauts to focus on the Vancouver hamburger restaurant chain that he co-owns, "Vera's Burger Shack."

Amongst many of the achievements in his CFL career, Noah won four Grey Cup championships. The first two occurred in 1996/97 with the Toronto Argonauts, in his second and third seasons with both the team and in the league. The third championship came in his sixth season in the CFL, his third consecutive with the B.C Lions, in 2000. He set a record of 32 tackles that season. His final Grey Cup came in 2004 while once again playing with the Argos, in his tenth year in the league. It was the second year of a four-year stint with the team. He retired from the league after twelve productive seasons.

== See also ==
- List of select Jewish football players
