= D. J. Flick =

American gridiron football player (born 1980)

No. 3
- Positions: Wide receiver, Slotback

Personal information
- Born: April 27, 1980 (age 46); Montgomery, Pennsylvania
- Listed height: 5 ft 9 in (1.75 m)
- Listed weight: 190 lb (86 kg)

Career information
- College: Slippery Rock

Career history
- 2002–2003: Ottawa Renegades
- 2004–2006: Hamilton Tiger-Cats
- 2007–2008: Saskatchewan Roughriders

Awards and highlights
- Grey Cup champion (2007); CFL All-Star (2004); 2× CFL East All-Star (2003, 2004); CFL West All-Star (2007)
- Stats at CFL.ca (archive)

David Julius Flick (born April 27, 1980) is an American former professional football receiver who played in the Canadian Football League (CFL) with the Ottawa Renegades, Hamilton Tiger-Cats, and Saskatchewan Roughriders.

Flick played four seasons of college football with Slippery Rock University.

Mr. Flick is currently the head varsity football coach for the Warrior Run School District in Northumberland County, Pennsylvania. He signed a one-year contract for the 2016 season and was offered another one-year contract for the 2017 season on January 23, 2017. The Warrior Run School District Varsity Football team had a regular-season record of 4 wins and 6 losses in Flick's first season with the program.
