= Eddie Davis (Canadian football) =

American gridiron football player (born 1973)

No. 29
- Position: Defensive back

Personal information
- Born: January 27, 1973 (age 53); St. Louis, Missouri, U.S.
- Listed height: 5 ft 10 in (1.78 m)
- Listed weight: 175 lb (79 kg)

Career information
- College: Northern Illinois

Career history
- 1995: Birmingham Barracudas
- 1996–2000: Calgary Stampeders
- 2001–2009: Saskatchewan Roughriders

Awards and highlights
- 2× Grey Cup champion (1998, 2007); 4× CFL All-Star (2000, 2004, 2005, 2006); 5× CFL West All-Star (2000, 2001, 2004, 2005, 2006)
- Stats at CFL.ca
- Canadian Football Hall of Fame (Class of 2015)

Eddie Davis (born January 27, 1973) is an American former professional football defensive halfback who played 15 seasons in the Canadian Football League (CFL), mainly with the Saskatchewan Roughriders. He played his college football for Northern Illinois University. He was often teamed one-on-one with the opposition's best receiver. The Saskatchewan Roughriders announced his retirement on February 25, 2010. On August 20, 2015, he was inducted into the Canadian Football Hall of Fame.
