= Frank Sargent Hoffman =

American philosopher (1852-1928)

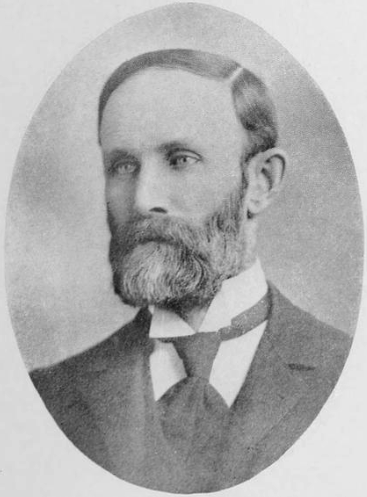
- Born: February 9, 1852; Sheboygan Falls, Wisconsin, US
- Died: December 21, 1928 (aged 76); Schenectady, New York, US
- Education: Amherst College; Yale University
- Occupation: Philosopher

Frank Sargent Hoffman (February 9, 1852 - December 21, 1928) was an American philosopher who wrote on psychology and religion.

== Biography ==
Hoffman was born in Sheboygan Falls, Wisconsin. In 1876 he graduated from Amherst College and obtained his PhD in 1896. He received a Bachelor of Divinity degree from Yale University. He was Professor of Philosophy at Union College. He contributed to The North American Review and was a member of the American Philosophical Association, American Psychology Society and Phi Beta Kappa society.

His 1903 book Psychology and Common Life received mixed reviews; a criticism was its overemphasis on psychical research.

Hoffman died at his home in Schenectady, New York on December 21, 1928.

== Publications ==
=== Articles ===
- Hoffman, Frank Sargent. (1900). "The Scientific Method in Theology". The North American Review 170 (521): 575-584.
- Hoffman, Frank Sargent. (1908). "What Is Religion?" The North American Review 187 (627): 231-239.

=== Books ===
- The Sphere of the State: Or, the People as a Body-Politic (1894)
- The Sphere of Science: A Study of the Nature and Method of Scientific Investigation (1898)
- Psychology and Common Life (1903)
- The Tales of Hoffman (1926)
