= Paul Lambert (Canadian football) =

Canadian gridiron football player (born 1975)

Profile
- Position: Guard

Personal information
- Born: November 21, 1975 (age 50); Montreal, Quebec, Canada
- Listed height: 6 ft 4 in (1.93 m)
- Listed weight: 295 lb (134 kg)

Career information
- College: Western Michigan
- CFL draft: 2000: 3rd round, 22nd overall pick

Career history
- 2001–2002: Hamilton Tiger-Cats
- 2003–2010: Montreal Alouettes

Awards and highlights
- Grey Cup champion (2009); CFL All-Star (2004); 2× CFL East All-Star (2004, 2008); First-team All-MAC (2000)
- Stats at CFL.ca

Paul Lambert (born November 21, 1975) is a Canadian former professional football offensive guard. He most recently played for the Montreal Alouettes.

== Early life ==
Lambert grew up in Montreal and played for the North Shore Lions, Sun Youth Hornets, Vanier College Cheetahs at Lennoxville Cougars. Lambert played in the local football system until university, when he was granted a scholarship to Western Michigan. He was selected for the first-team, All-Mid American Conference as a senior in 2000 as an O-lineman.

== Professional career ==
Lambert was drafted in the third round of the 2000 CFL draft by the Hamilton Tiger-Cats and, in the 2001 CFL season, selected as the Tiger-Cats Rookie of the Year, starting in all regular season games and two playoff games.

In February 2003, Lambert signed with the Alouettes. He won the 2009 Grey Cup with Montreal while on injured reserved and earned a ring with Montreal when the team won the 2010 Grey Cup

On January 19, 2011, it was announced that the Alouettes had granted Lambert his request for a release.

Speculation is that Lambert will join the McGill Redmen Football coaching staff. He will join Matthieu Quiviger (ex-Redmen-CFLer)in coaching the offensive line.

== Personal life ==
Lambert has 2 kids named Tatum Lambert and Jake Lambert.
