= Kevin Johnson (Canadian football) =

American football player (born 1973)

No. 44
- Position: Linebacker

Personal information
- Born: December 27, 1973 (age 52); Winder, Georgia, U.S.

Career information
- College: Ohio State

Career history
- 1999–2001: Calgary Stampeders
- 2002–2005: Montreal Alouettes

Awards and highlights
- 2× Grey Cup champion (2001, 2002); James P. McCaffrey Trophy (2003); 3× CFL East All-Star (2002, 2003, 2004)

Kevin Johnson (born December 27, 1973) is an American former professional football player who was a linebacker in the Canadian Football League (CFL) for seven years. Johnson played for the Calgary Stampeders and Montreal Alouettes from 1999 to 2005. He played college football for the Ohio State Buckeyes.
