= Almondo Curry =

American football player and coach (born 1980)

Alomondo Curry
North Carolina A&T Aggies
- Title: Cornerbacks coach

Personal information
- Born: August 18, 1980 (age 46); Hampton, Virginia, U.S.
- Listed height: 5 ft 8 in (1.73 m)
- Listed weight: 175 lb (79 kg)

Career information
- College: Virginia
- NFL draft: 2004: undrafted

Career history

Playing
- Montreal Alouettes (2004–2005); Saskatchewan Roughriders (2006)

Coaching
- Hampton HS (VA) (2008–2010) Assistant coach; Heritage HS (VA) (2011) Defensive coordinator; Christopher Newport (2012–2014) Defensive backs coach; Virginia State (2015–2016) Defensive backs coach; William & Mary (2019) Quality control coach & defensive analyst; Maryville (2020) Cornerbacks coach; Towson (2021–2022) Cornerbacks coach; North Carolina A&T (2023–present) Cornerbacks coach

Awards and highlights
- Frank M. Gibson Trophy (2004)

Almondo Alfonzo Curry (born August 18, 1980) is an American college football coach and former cornerback. He is the cornerbacks coach for North Carolina A&T State University, a position he has held since 2023. He played college football for Virginia. After going undrafted in the 2004 NFL Draft he signed with the Montreal Alouettes of the Canadian Football League (CFL). He also played for the Saskatchewan Roughriders.

== College career ==
From 1999 to 2003, Curry played college football for Virginia as a cornerback.

== Professional career ==
=== Montreal Alouettes ===
After going undrafted in the 2004 NFL Draft, Curry signed with the Montreal Alouettes of the Canadian Football League (CFL). He was named to the CFL All-Star team in 2004

=== Saskatchewan Roughriders ===
In 2006, Curry was traded to Saskatchewan Roughriders for quarterback, Nealon Greene.

== Coaching career ==
In 2008, Curry was hired as an assistant coach for Hampton High School.

In 2011, Curry was hired as the defensive coordinator for Heritage High School.

In 2012, Curry was hired as the defensive backs coach for Christopher Newport.

In 2015, Curry was hired as the defensive backs coach for Virginia State. He held the position until 2016.

In 2019, Curry was hired as a quality control coach and defensive analyst for William & Mary.

In 2020, Curry was hired as the cornerbacks coach for Maryville.

In 2021, Curry was hired as the cornerbacks coach for Towson.

In 2023, Curry was hired as the cornerbacks coach for North Carolina A&T.

== Personal life ==
In 2003, Curry was charged with assault and battery. He was acquitted in April 2003.
