= Kelly Malveaux =

American gridiron football player (1976–2024)

No. 40, 22, 23, 3, 27, 21, 24
- Positions: Defensive back, linebacker

Personal information
- Born: November 5, 1976; Bellflower, California, U.S.
- Died: January 24, 2024 (aged 47)
- Listed height: 5 ft 9 in (1.75 m)
- Listed weight: 185 lb (84 kg)

Career information
- High school: Long Beach Poly (Long Beach, California)
- College: Arizona
- NFL draft: 1998: undrafted

Career history
- San Francisco 49ers (1998–1999)*; Amsterdam Admirals (1999); Saskatchewan Roughriders (1999); New England Patriots (1999–2000)*; Orlando Rage (2001); Calgary Stampeders (2001–2003); Montreal Alouettes (2004–2005); Winnipeg Blue Bombers (2006–2009); Edmonton Eskimos (2009); Sacramento Mountain Lions (2010)
- * Offseason or practice squad member only

Awards and highlights
- Grey Cup champion (2001); 2× CFL All-Star (2004, 2008); Second-team All-Pac-10 (1995)

Kelly Thomas Malveaux II (November 5, 1976 – January 24, 2024) was an American professional football player who was a defensive back in the Canadian Football League (CFL). He played college football for the Arizona Wildcats.

== Career ==
Malveaux had previously played for several other CFL teams, including the Winnipeg Blue Bombers, Montreal Alouettes, Calgary Stampeders, and Saskatchewan Roughriders.

Malveaux had a productive year for the Blue Bombers in 2008, contributing 63 tackles, two interceptions, and a sack.

On May 15, 2009, Malveaux was traded from the Blue Bombers to the Edmonton Eskimos for defensive end Fred Perry.

On February 25, 2010, Malveaux was released from the Edmonton Eskimos.

Malveaux died on January 24, 2024, at the age of 47.
