= Anwar Stewart =

American football player and coach (born 1976)

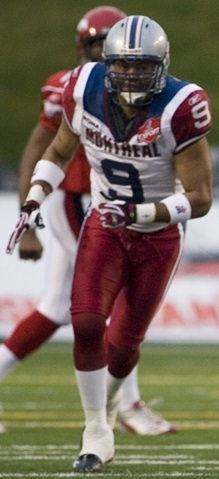
- Stewart with the Montreal Alouettes in 2007

Kentucky Wildcats
- Title: Defensive line coach

Personal information
- Born: February 9, 1976 (age 50); Panama City, Florida, U.S.
- Listed height: 6 ft 4 in (1.93 m)
- Listed weight: 255 lb (116 kg)

Career information
- Position: Defensive end (No. 74, 58, 9, 97, 00)
- College: Kentucky

Career history

Playing
- Calgary Stampeders (2001); Montreal Alouettes (2002–2011); Calgary Stampeders (2012); Montreal Alouettes (2013)

Coaching
- Montreal Alouettes (2014) Defensive quality control coach; Montreal Alouettes (2015) Defensive ends coach; Montreal Alouettes (2016) Defensive line coach; Kentucky (2017–2018) Defensive assistant; Appalachian State (2019) Defensive line coach; Kentucky (2020–present) Defensive line coach

Awards and highlights
- As player: 4× Grey Cup champion (2001, 2002, 2009, 2010); 2× CFL All-Star (2004, 2009); 3× CFL East All-Star (2003, 2004, 2009); CFL's Most Outstanding Defensive Player Award (2004); 2× James P. McCaffrey Trophy (2004, 2009)

Anwar Stewart (born February 9, 1976) is an American football coach and former player. He is the defensive line coach for the University of Kentucky, a position he has held since 2020. He played college football for the Kentucky Wildcats and played in the Canadian Football League (CFL) for 13 seasons.

== Playing career ==
After playing his college football at the University of Kentucky, Stewart joined the CFL's Calgary Stampeders for the 2001 season, playing one game before being released the following year in the preseason.

From 2002 to 2011 Stewart played for the Montreal Alouettes, leading the team in quarterback sacks for four seasons (2003–06). In 2004, he had 21 tackles, 9 sacks and 4 interceptions (returning 2 of those for touchdowns), good enough to make the CFL All Star Team and to win the CFL's Most Outstanding Defensive Player Award. On October 12, 2009, Stewart became the Alouettes all-time sacks leader with 53 career sacks, passing Elfrid Payton who had 52. He finished with 66 career sacks in Montreal after he was released on February 8, 2012.

On October 10, 2012, Stewart again signed with the Calgary Stampeders where he recorded 4 sacks in only 4 games, bringing his career total to 70. Following the 2012 CFL season, he was released by the Stampeders. He was signed to the Alouettes' practice roster on August 13, 2013, after Montreal released Ejiro Kuale earlier in the week.

== Coaching career ==
=== Montreal Alouettes ===
After retiring from playing in 2013, Stewart was hired by the Alouettes in 2014 as a defensive quality control coach. He was promoted in 2015 to the team’s defensive ends coach and in 2016 was given the title of defensive line coach.

=== Kentucky ===
He returned to his alma mater in 2017 where he stayed two years working as a defensive assistant.

=== Appalachian State ===
In 2019, Stewart was the defensive line coach for Appalachian State.

=== Kentucky (second stint) ===
In 2020, Stewart returned to Kentucky as the team’s defensive line coach.
