= Noel Prefontaine =

American gridiron football player (born 1973)

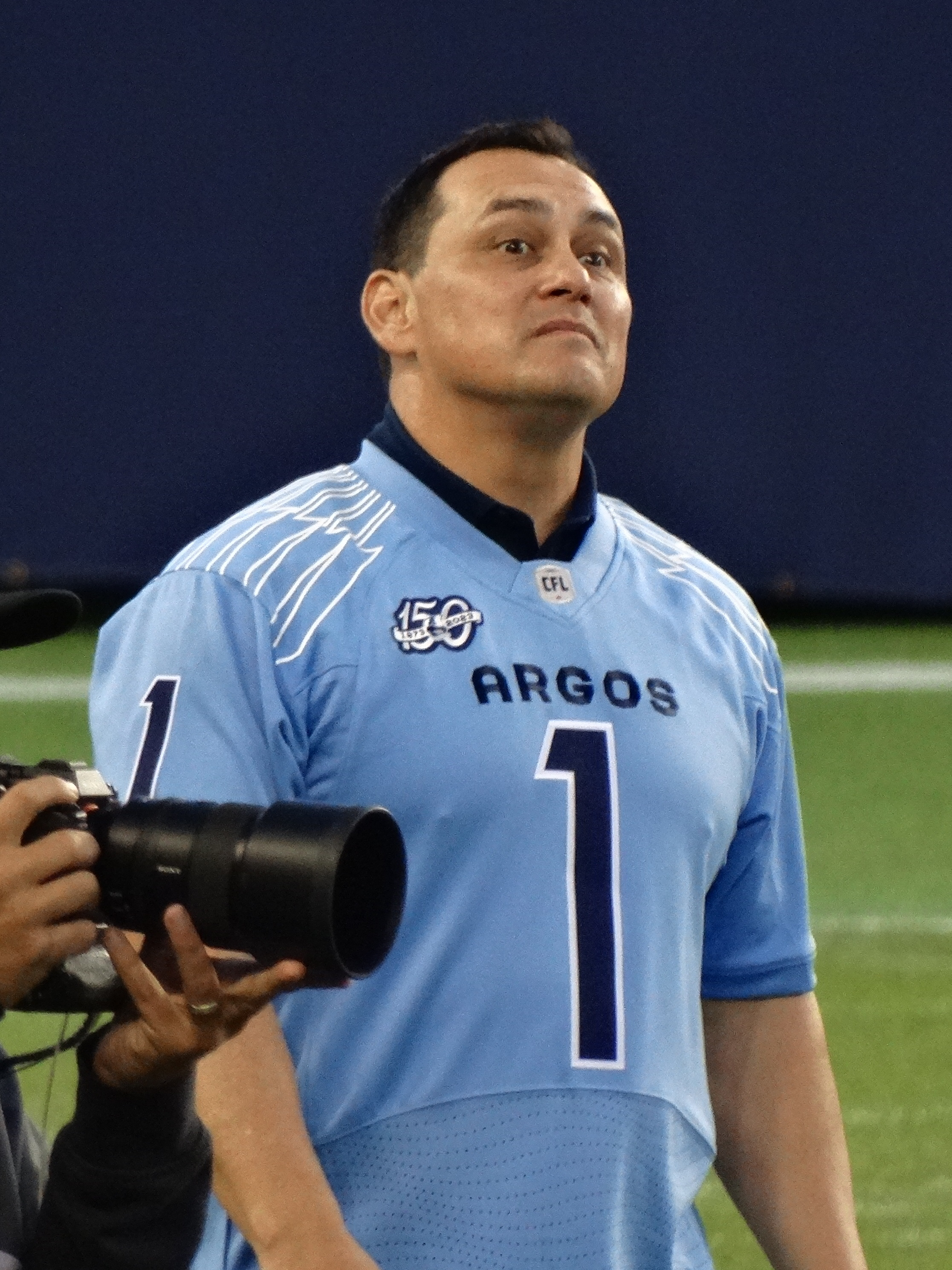
- Prefontaine in 2023

No. 1
- Positions: Placekicker, punter

Personal information
- Born: December 23, 1973 (age 52); Camp Pendleton, California, U.S.
- Listed height: 5 ft 11 in (1.80 m)
- Listed weight: 205 lb (93 kg)

Career information
- High school: El Camino
- College: San Diego State
- CFL draft: 1998: Supplemental 6th round

Career history
- 1998–2007: Toronto Argonauts
- 2001: Los Angeles Xtreme
- 2001: Baltimore Ravens*
- 2003: Kansas City Chiefs*
- 2008–2010: Edmonton Eskimos
- 2010–2013: Toronto Argonauts
- * Offseason or practice squad member only

Awards and highlights
- 2× Grey Cup champion (2004, 2012); 6× CFL All-Star (1999, 2000, 2002, 2003, 2004, 2006; 8× CFL East All-Star (1999, 2000, 2002, 2003, 2004, 2005, 2006, 2011); First-team All-American (1996); 2× John Agro Special Teams Award (2005, 2006)
- Stats at CFL.ca (archive)

Noel Michael Prefontaine (born December 23, 1973) is an American former professional football punter and placekicker in the Canadian Football League (CFL).

== Early life ==
Prefontaine was born to a French Canadian father and a Vietnamese mother at the Marine Corps Base Camp Pendleton in California. His father was born and raised in Verdun, Quebec and Noel lived with his grandmother in Verdun as a child, which enabled him to be considered a non-import for CFL purposes. He returned to the United States and attended El Camino High School in San Diego County, California.

Prefontaine played baseball, soccer, and played offensive tackle in American football as a child and continually trained himself to improve as an athlete and at high school, he played quarterback as well as punting and placekicking. He was named San Diego Tribune Athlete of the Year for North County as a senior and led El Camino High School to a 22–2 record and a CIF Championship as their starting quarterback.

Prefontaine hoped to play quarterback in college football but could only obtain a scholarship as a punter at California State University, Fullerton. His punting average his first year led the state but the football program folded at the end of the season. Prefontaine received offers to play for multiple college football teams including Michigan, Michigan State, Georgia, LSU, and Texas but chose to go to Arizona State University because it was close to his family and friends. He was unhappy there, however, and left to go to San Diego State University. After a required redshirt year because of his transfer, he was named All-Conference as a punter in his junior year and first-team All-American as a punter in his senior year.

== Professional career ==
=== XFL ===
In 2001, Prefontaine also played in the XFL with the Los Angeles Xtreme as their punter. He was officially listed as the team's third-string quarterback (behind Tommy Maddox and Scott Milanovich, the latter of whom would eventually become Prefontaine's coach in Toronto) in order to collect a higher salary and because the XFL did not reserve separate roster spots for punters (on the other XFL teams, placekickers doubled as punters). He went on to play in the one and only XFL championship game on April 21, 2001, with the Xtreme, with his team ultimately winning the championship.

=== CFL ===
Prefontaine began his CFL career in 1998 with the Toronto Argonauts and spent the next ten seasons with them before getting traded to the Edmonton Eskimos on May 31, 2008, for a first round pick in the 2009 CFL draft and a conditional draft pick in 2010. On October 12, 2010, Prefontaine was traded back to the Argonauts in exchange for defensive tackle Étienne Légaré and the negotiation rights to defensive back Damaso Munoz. On February 12, 2014, Prefontaine was released by the Argonauts. In his CFL career Prefontaine won the Grey Cup twice, both with the Argonauts, in 2004 and 2012. On August 14, 2014, Prefontaine announced that he will sign a 1-day contract with the Toronto Argonauts on August 17, with the purpose of retiring as an Argonaut. The decision to retire as an Argonaut came despite initial remarks he made in 2008 shortly following his trade to the Eskimos team that he had no desire to retire as an Argonaut, citing bitterness he had toward the organization concerning the trade.
