= 92nd Grey Cup =

2004 Canadian Football championship game

Toronto Argonauts	BC Lions
(10–7–1)	(13–5)
27	19
Head coach: Michael Clemons	Head coach: Wally Buono
	1	2	3	4	Total
Toronto Argonauts	0	17	7	3	27
BC Lions	7	3	3	6	19
- Date: November 21, 2004
- Stadium: Frank Clair Stadium
- Location: Ottawa
- Most Valuable Player: Damon Allen, QB (Argonauts)
- Most Valuable Canadian: Jason Clermont, SB (Lions)
- National anthem: Keshia Chanté
- Referee: Andre Proulx
- Halftime show: The Tragically Hip
- Attendance: 51,242

Broadcasters
- Network: CBC, RDS
- Announcers: (CBC) Steve Armitage, Chris Cuthbert, Darren Flutie, Greg Frers, Mark Lee, Chris Walby, Brian Williams, Sean Millington
- Ratings: 4,012,000

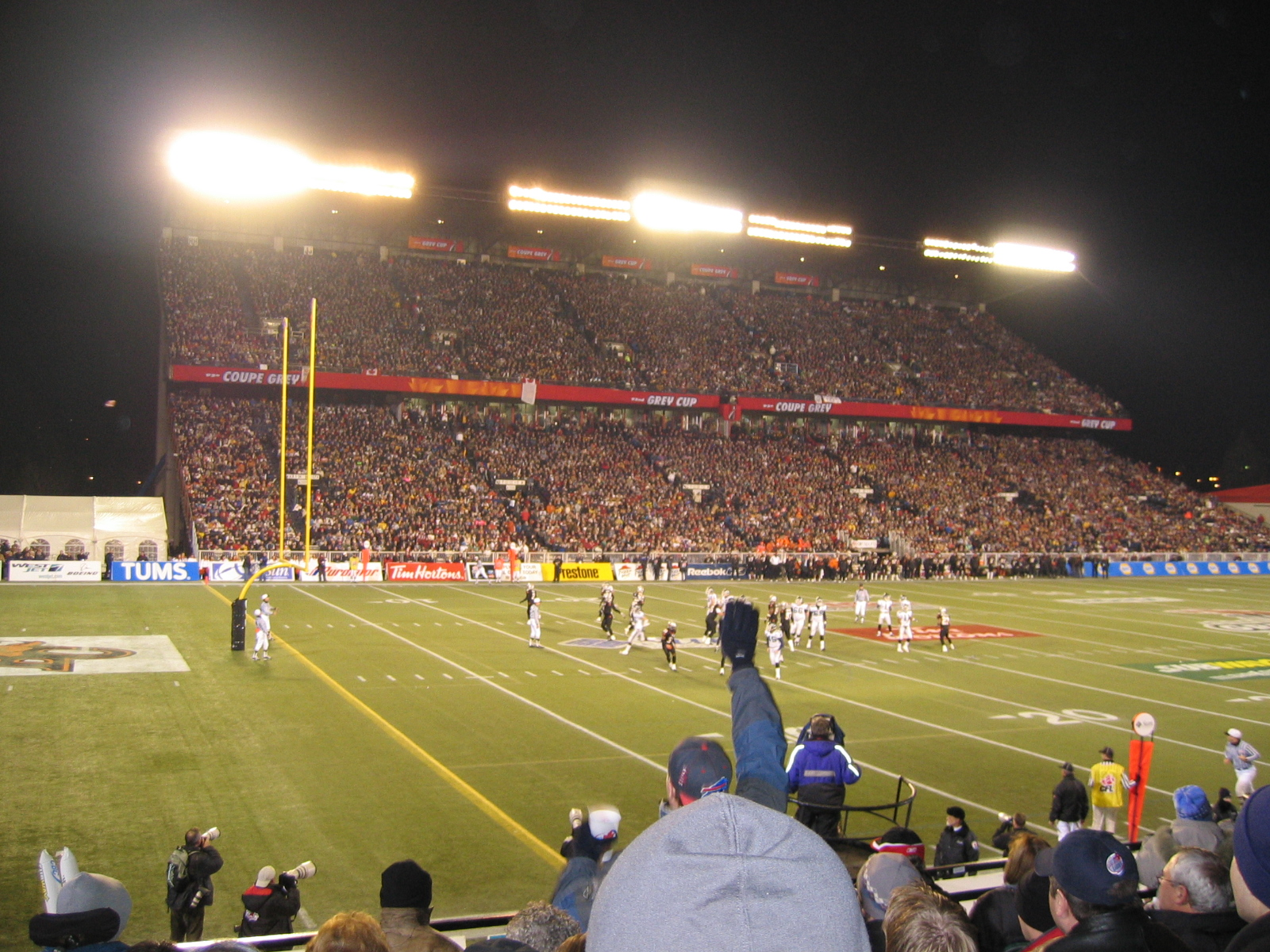
Frank Clair Stadium during the 92nd Grey Cup

The 92nd Grey Cup game took place on November 21, 2004, at Frank Clair Stadium in Ottawa, Ontario. The game decided the championship of the 2004 Canadian Football League season. The Toronto Argonauts defeated the BC Lions 27–19.

This is the first Grey Cup game to be played on the next-generation FieldTurf surface.

== Game summary ==
Toronto Argonauts (27) - TDs, Damon Allen (2), Robert Baker; FGs Noel Prefontaine (2); cons., Prefontaine (3).

BC Lions (19) - TDs, Jason Clermont, Dave Dickenson; FGs Duncan O'Mahony (2); cons. O'Mahony (1).

First quarter
BC – TD Clermont 12 pass from Dickenson (O'Mahony convert) 4:07 7 - 0 BC

Second quarter
TOR – FG Prefontaine 27 7:40 7 - 3 BC
TOR – TD Allen 1 run (Prefontaine convert) 12:22 10 - 7 TOR
BC – FG O'Mahony 42 13:13 10 - 10 TIE
TOR – TD Baker 23 pass from Allen (Prefontaine convert) 14:37 17 - 10 TOR

Third quarter
TOR – TD Allen 1 run (Prefontaine convert) 4:45 24 - 10 TOR
BC – FG O'Mahony 36 9:16 24 - 13 TOR

Fourth quarter
BC – TD Dickenson 7 run (convert failed) 6:06 24 - 19 TOR
TOR – FG Prefontaine 16 12:19 27 - 19 TOR

The BC Lions took the opening kickoff and fashioned an impressive drive that started and ended with a Jason Clermont reception. Quarterback Dave Dickenson was perfect on a series of short precision passes, taking the Lions from their own 38-yard-line down the field for a touchdown and an early 7-0 lead. The scoring play was a 12-yard toss to Clermont on a play fake that drew away the Toronto defence, which looked bewildered on the whole series.

Toronto nearly hit a field goal later in the quarter, but a flag was thrown on Noel Prefontaine's 39-yard attempt. The subsequent kick from 47 yards missed, leaving BC pinned near its own goal line.

But Dickenson engineered a series of first downs as the quarter wound down, moving the Lions to midfield with help from receivers Geroy Simon and Ryan Thelwell and a nine-yard carry by Antonio Warren. Duncan O'Mahony punted as the quarter ended, angling the ball out of bounds at the Argos' 21-yard line. Overall, BC had the ball in their possession a whopping 11 minutes in the opening 15.

Damon Allen failed to ignite the Argos offence early in the second quarter, despite two quick chances thanks to a punt return fumble by Aaron Lockett of the Lions. On the second of two Noel Prefontaine punts, Lockett held on to the ball and ran BC to its own 50-yard line. But the Lions couldn't move the ball. Trying to avoid dangerous punt returner Bashir Levingston, BC kicker Duncan O'Mahony angled his punt out of bounds for only nine yards, giving Toronto good field position.

A long completion from Allen to R. Jay Soward moved the Argos to the BC 20, and a 27-yard field goal by Prefontaine put Toronto on the board.

Allen began to find his receivers on Toronto's next drive, hitting Robert Baker for a 35-yarder and a 20-yarder to move inside the Lions' red zone. A pass interference call against the Lions then put the ball at the 1-yard line, and Allen plunged across for the touchdown and the Argos' first lead.

BC responded immediately, getting into field goal range on a Jason Clermont catch from Dave Dickenson. Duncan O'Mahony hit a 42-yarder to draw the Lions even. But just before the half, Allen again connected with Baker for a 23-yard touchdown.

The field-position advantage enjoyed by the Toronto Argonauts in the second quarter continued on the opening drive of the second half, as Allen got the ball at midfield. Allen moved the ball efficiently again, and for the second time in the game dove for a one-yard touchdown to give the Argos a 14-point lead.

Dave Dickenson had some success moving the ball for BC, but the Lions could only muster a 36-yard field goal by Duncan O'Mahony.

On Toronto's next possession, Allen went down with an apparent leg injury while running for a first down. Ironically, the play was called back on a holding penalty. Michael Bishop replaced Allen at quarterback while the 41-year-old received treatment on the bench.

The Lions defence got its best pressure of the game on Bishop early in the fourth, forcing an errant pass then nearly causing a fumble on the next play.

Dave Dickenson took over for the Lions at his own 10-yard line, and engineered an impressive drive. Lyle Green caught two passes for first downs before running back Antonio Warren took over. Warren ran for 30 and 15 yards, setting up a Lions touchdown on Dave Dickenson's five-yard rush and dive into the end zone. Two consecutive time-count violations on a two-point conversion attempt pushed Duncan O'Mahony back for a 22-yard convert attempt that went wide.

Damon Allen returned to the game for the Argos, and was promptly decked as he tried to pass by a charging Barrin Simpson.

Dickenson just missed a streaking Geroy Simon's outstretched hands to stop the next BC drive, and Toronto took over again with a short field.

Allen found Tony Miles wide open and pushed down to the Lions' 10-yard line with the clock at three minutes and counting. Noel Prefontaine pushed the Argos' lead to eight points on a short field goal.

BC failed to move the ball on what would turn out to be its last chance with the ball, Dickenson just missing the outstretched hands of Simon on a bomb attempt.

With the ball back, the Argos got two crucial first downs and wound down the clock to win the game and their 15th Grey Cup.

== Notable participants ==
- Casey Printers, the 2004 Most Outstanding Player, dressed for the game but did not see any playing time. He had stepped in at quarterback for the Lions after an early-season injury to Dickenson, but Dickenson returned in time to play in the Grey Cup.
- Jason Clermont, a Regina native who scored the game's opening touchdown, was also named the Most Outstanding Canadian Award in the CFL over the season.
- Toronto Argonauts' 41-year-old quarterback Damon Allen, was named the game's Most Valuable Player for the third time in his career.

== 2004 CFL Playoffs ==
=== West Division ===
- Semi-final (November 7 @ Edmonton, Alberta) Saskatchewan Roughriders 14-6 Edmonton Eskimos
- Final (November 14 @ Vancouver, British Columbia) BC Lions 27-25 Saskatchewan Roughriders (OT)

=== East Division ===
- Semi-final (November 5 @ Toronto, Ontario) Toronto Argonauts 24-6 Hamilton Tiger-Cats
- Final (November 14 @ Montreal, Quebec) Toronto Argonauts 26-18 Montreal Alouettes
