= 2004 CFL season =

Canadian Football League season

- Duration: June 15 – October 30, 2004
- East champions: Toronto Argonauts
- West champions: BC Lions

92nd Grey Cup
- Date: November 21, 2004
- Venue: Frank Clair Stadium, Ottawa
- Champions: Toronto Argonauts

CFL seasons
- ← 2003 2005 →

Canadian Football League team locations: West, East

The 2004 CFL season is considered to be the 51st season in modern-day Canadian football, although it is officially the 47th Canadian Football League season.

== CFL news in 2004 ==
Neil Payne retired from his position as Director of Officiating in February and was replaced by George Black. Former Eskimos Head Coach, Tom Higgins was named as the 2003 Coach of the Year. CFL Commissioner Tom E. Wright, announced that Vancouver would host the 93rd Grey Cup for 2005. Furthermore, Wright also announced in late October, that Winnipeg would be the host of the 94th Grey Cup for 2006.

Wayne Smith of Appalachian State University was drafted first overall in the 2004 CFL draft by the Hamilton Tiger-Cats. Former player, broadcaster and football administrator, Mike Wadsworth died in April. In September, the Canadian Football Hall of Fame inducted Larry Highbaugh, Cal Murphy, Lui Passaglia, Dan Yochum and Ben Zambiasi during the Induction Weekend ceremonies in Hamilton.

CFL partner, Sun Microsystems added and launched real-time, in-game statistics entry with live play-by-play and scoring on cfl.ca. On June 2, the CFL announced a partnership with FSN and launched a player-based and team-based game for the 2004 season. In addition, the CFL also launched its first ever online kids section called — the Dare CFL KidsZone.

The CFL started a new international broadcasting agreement with Trajectory Sports & Media Group, to deliver Canadian Football to more than 50 million households in 176 countries for the 2004 season. U.S. television coverage of the 92nd Grey Cup resulted in the largest international broadcast distribution of a Grey Cup game — when it was made available to more than 55 million television households. In addition, Rogers Sportsnet announced the start of "CFL Crunch", which is a 30-minute news segment concerning the league on June 24.

On October 18, the Toronto Argonauts announced their agreement with York University, to construct a new 25,000-seat stadium on the university's Keele campus.

League attendance increased by 8% over the 2003 season, when more than 2.2 million fans were coming into CFL stadiums. The BC Lions home attendance figures increased by 13% over the 2003 season, by averaging about 26,697 fans per game at BC Place Stadium. The Montreal Alouettes continued their strong attendance figures by recording its fifth straight year of having sell out crowds at both, Percival Molson Memorial Stadium and Olympic Stadium. The CFL set a new playoff attendance record with a total of 181,717 postseason crowds attending playoff games in Toronto, Edmonton, Montreal, Vancouver and Ottawa. The Grey Cup game in Ottawa had a sell-out crowd of 51,242 at Frank Clair Stadium.

The attendance increases were likely caused at least in part by the lack of NHL hockey in the wake of the 2004–05 NHL lockout.

Records: Before he retired, Edmonton running back, Mike Pringle, established two new records in 2004. The first record was accomplished on July 12, when Pringle established a new CFL career record for yards from scrimmage with 20,254 yards in the Eskimos 25–9 win over the B.C. Lions. The second record was accomplished on September 19 against the same B.C. Lions, when Pringle became the all-time leading rusher in CFL history with 16,425 yards.

In addition, three CFL quarterbacks established new records as well. Edmonton's Jason Maas, entered the CFL record books by setting a new mark for most consecutive pass completions in a regular season game with 22 on July 30. On August 13, B.C.'s Casey Printers, sets a new CFL record for the highest pass completion percentage in a regular season game by completing 90.9% of his passes. Furthermore, Hamilton's Danny McManus, joined the company of Damon Allen and Ron Lancaster by surpassing the milestone of passing for 50,000 or more career yards on October 21.

The Montreal Alouettes became the first team in CFL history to have four receivers on one team reach the 1000-yard receiving mark in one season: Ben Cahoon (1183 yards), Jeremaine Copeland (1154 yards), Thyron Anderson (1147 yards), and Kwame Cavil (1090 yards)

The Toronto Argonauts won their 15th Grey Cup by defeating the B.C. Lions 27–19 on November 21.

== Regular season standings ==
West Division
Pos	Team	Pld	W	L	T	PF	PA	PD	Pts
1	BC Lions (C, Q)	18	13	5	0	584	436	+148	26
2	Edmonton Eskimos (Q)	18	9	9	0	532	472	+60	18
3	Saskatchewan Roughriders (Q)	18	9	9	0	476	444	+32	18
4	Winnipeg Blue Bombers	18	7	11	0	448	507	−59	14
5	Calgary Stampeders	18	4	14	0	396	522	−126	8

Source: "2004 Regular Season Standings". Archived from the original on November 10, 2011.
(C) First round bye; (Q) Qualified for playoffs

East Division
Pos	Team	Pld	W	L	T	PF	PA	PD	Pts
1	Montreal Alouettes (C, Q)	18	14	4	0	584	371	+213	28
2	Toronto Argonauts (Q)	18	10	7	1	422	414	+8	21
3	Hamilton Tiger-Cats (Q)	18	9	8	1	455	542	−87	19
4	Ottawa Renegades	18	5	13	0	401	560	−159	10

Source: "2004 Regular Season Standings". Archived from the original on November 10, 2011.
(C) First round bye; (Q) Qualified for playoffs
- BC and Montreal both have first round byes.

== Grey Cup playoffs ==
The Toronto Argonauts are the 2004 Grey Cup Champions, defeating the BC Lions 27–19, at Ottawa's Frank Clair Stadium. It was the first Grey Cup for Toronto since the 85th Grey Cup in 1997. The Argonauts' Damon Allen (QB) was named the Grey Cup's Most Valuable Player and the Lions' Jason Clermont (SB) was the Grey Cup's Most Valuable Canadian.

=== Playoff bracket ===
November 5 & November 7: Division Semifinals
East
E3	Hamilton Tiger-Cats	6
E2	Toronto Argonauts	24
West
W3	Saskatchewan Roughriders	14
W2	Edmonton Eskimos	6

November 14: Division Finals
E2	Toronto Argonauts	26
E1	Montreal Alouettes	18
W3	Saskatchewan Roughriders	25
W1	BC Lions	27*

November 21: 92nd Grey Cup; Frank Clair Stadium – Ottawa, ON
E2	Toronto Argonauts	27
W1	BC Lions	19

*-Team won in Overtime.

== CFL leaders ==
- CFL passing leaders
- CFL rushing leaders
- CFL receiving leaders

== 2004 CFL All-Stars ==
=== Offence ===
- QB – Casey Printers, BC Lions
- RB – Troy Davis, Hamilton Tiger-Cats
- RB – Charles Roberts, Winnipeg Blue Bombers
- SB – Ben Cahoon, Montreal Alouettes
- SB – Geroy Simon, BC Lions
- WR – D. J. Flick, Hamilton Tiger-Cats
- WR – Jason Tucker, Edmonton Eskimos
- C – Bryan Chiu, Montreal Alouettes
- OG – Paul Lambert, Montreal Alouettes
- OG – Andrew Greene, Saskatchewan Roughriders
- OT – Uzooma Okeke, Montreal Alouettes
- OT – Gene Makowsky, Saskatchewan Roughriders

=== Defence ===
- DT – Noah Cantor, Toronto Argonauts
- DT – Nate Davis, Saskatchewan Roughriders
- DE – Tim Cheatwood, Hamilton Tiger-Cats
- DE – Anwar Stewart, Montreal Alouettes
- LB – John Grace, Calgary Stampeders
- LB – Kevin Eiben, Toronto Argonauts
- LB – Barrin Simpson, BC Lions
- CB – Almondo Curry, Montreal Alouettes
- CB – Malcolm Frank, Edmonton Eskimos
- DB – Eddie Davis, Saskatchewan Roughriders
- DB – Clifford Ivory, Toronto Argonauts
- DS – Orlondo Steinauer, Toronto Argonauts

=== Special teams ===
- P – Noel Prefontaine, Toronto Argonauts
- K – Sean Fleming, Edmonton Eskimos
- ST – Keith Stokes, Winnipeg Blue Bombers

== 2004 Western All-Stars ==
=== Offence ===
- QB – Casey Printers, BC Lions
- RB – Kenton Keith, Saskatchewan Roughriders
- RB – Charles Roberts, Winnipeg Blue Bombers
- SB – Jason Clermont, BC Lions
- SB – Geroy Simon, BC Lions
- WR – Ryan Thelwell, BC Lions
- WR – Jason Tucker, Edmonton Eskimos
- C – Angus Reid, BC Lions
- OG – Jay McNeil, Calgary Stampeders
- OG – Andrew Greene, Saskatchewan Roughriders
- OT – Seth Dittman, Calgary Stampeders
- OT – Gene Makowsky, Saskatchewan Roughriders

=== Defence ===
- DT – Joe Fleming, Calgary Stampeders
- DT – Nate Davis, Saskatchewan Roughriders
- DE – Brent Johnson, BC Lions
- DE – Tom Canada, Winnipeg Blue Bombers
- LB – John Grace, Calgary Stampeders
- LB – Reggie Hunt, Saskatchewan Roughriders
- LB – Barrin Simpson, BC Lions
- DB – Wes Lysack, Winnipeg Blue Bombers
- DB – Malcolm Frank, Edmonton Eskimos
- DB – Eddie Davis, Saskatchewan Roughriders
- DB – Joey Boese, Calgary Stampeders
- DS – Sam Young, BC Lions

=== Special teams ===
- P – Sean Fleming, Edmonton Eskimos
- K – Sean Fleming, Edmonton Eskimos
- ST – Keith Stokes, Winnipeg Blue Bombers

== 2004 Eastern All-Stars ==
=== Offence ===
- QB – Anthony Calvillo, Montreal Alouettes
- RB – Troy Davis, Hamilton Tiger-Cats
- RB – Josh Ranek, Ottawa Renegades
- SB – Ben Cahoon, Montreal Alouettes
- SB – Jeremaine Copeland, Montreal Alouettes
- WR – D. J. Flick, Hamilton Tiger-Cats
- WR – Kwame Cavil, Montreal Alouettes
- C – Bryan Chiu, Montreal Alouettes
- OG – Paul Lambert, Montreal Alouettes
- OG – Scott Flory, Montreal Alouettes
- OT – Uzooma Okeke, Montreal Alouettes
- OT – Dave Hack, Hamilton Tiger-Cats

=== Defence ===
- DT – Noah Cantor, Toronto Argonauts
- DT – Ed Philion, Montreal Alouettes
- DE – Tim Cheatwood, Hamilton Tiger-Cats
- DE – Anwar Stewart, Montreal Alouettes
- LB – Kevin Johnson, Montreal Alouettes
- LB – Kevin Eiben, Toronto Argonauts
- LB – Tim Strickland, Montreal Alouettes
- CB – Almondo Curry, Montreal Alouettes
- CB – Davis Sanchez, Montreal Alouettes
- DB – Kelly Malveaux, Montreal Alouettes
- DB – Clifford Ivory, Toronto Argonauts
- DS – Orlondo Steinauer, Toronto Argonauts

=== Special teams ===
- P – Noel Prefontaine, Toronto Argonauts
- K – Noel Prefontaine, Toronto Argonauts
- ST – Bashir Levingston, Toronto Argonauts

== 2004 CFLPA All-Stars ==
=== Offence ===
- QB – Casey Printers, BC Lions
- OT – Uzooma Okeke, Montreal Alouettes
- OT – Cory Mantyka, BC Lions
- OG – Andrew Greene, Saskatchewan Roughriders
- OG – Dan Comiskey, Edmonton Eskimos
- C – Jamie Crysdale, Calgary Stampeders
- RB – Troy Davis, Hamilton Tiger Cats
- FB – Julian Radlein, Hamilton Tiger Cats
- SB – Geroy Simon, BC Lions
- SB – Derrell Mitchell, Edmonton Eskimos
- WR – Jason Tucker, Edmonton Eskimos
- WR – David Flick, Hamilton Tiger Cats

=== Defence ===
- DE – Joe Montford, Hamilton Tiger Cats
- DE – Timothy Cheatwood, Hamilton Tiger Cats
- DT – Joe Fleming, Winnipeg Blue Bombers
- DT – Nate Davis, Saskatchewan Roughriders
- LB – Barrin Simpson, BC Lions
- LB – John Grace, Calgary Stampeders
- LB – Kevin Johnson, Montreal Alouettes
- CB – Malcolm Frank, Edmonton Eskimos
- CB – Omarr Morgan, Saskatchewan Roughriders
- HB – Clifford Ivory, Toronto Argonauts
- HB – Eddie Davis, Saskatchewan Roughriders
- S – Orlondo Steinauer, Toronto Argonauts

=== Special teams ===
- K – Paul McCallum, Saskatchewan Roughriders
- P – Noel Prefontaine, Toronto Argonauts
- ST – Keith Stokes, Winnipeg Blue Bombers

=== Head coach ===
- Greg Marshall, Hamilton Tiger-Cats

== 2004 Rogers CFL Awards ==
- CFL's Most Outstanding Player Award – Casey Printers (QB), BC Lions
- CFL's Most Outstanding Canadian Award – Jason Clermont (SB), BC Lions
- CFL's Most Outstanding Defensive Player Award – Anwar Stewart (DE), Montreal Alouettes
- CFL's Most Outstanding Offensive Lineman Award – Gene Makowsky (OT), Saskatchewan Roughriders
- CFL's Most Outstanding Rookie Award – Nikolas Lewis (WR), Calgary Stampeders
- CFL's Most Outstanding Special Teams Award – Keith Stokes (WR), Winnipeg Blue Bombers
- CFLPA's Outstanding Community Service Award – Barron Miles (DB), Montreal Alouettes
- Rogers Fans' Choice Award – Danny McManus (QB), Hamilton Tiger-Cats / Anthony Calvillo (QB), Montreal Alouettes
- CFL's Coach of the Year – Greg Marshall, Hamilton Tiger-Cats
- Commissioner's Award - Russ Jackson, Ottawa Rough Riders
