= 2013 Hamilton Tiger-Cats season =

Season of Canadian Football League team the Hamilton Tiger-Cats

- General manager: Kent Austin
- Head coach: Kent Austin
- Home stadium: Alumni Stadium

Results
- Record: 10–8
- Division place: 2nd, East
- Playoffs: Lost Grey Cup
- Team MOP: Henry Burris
- Team MOC: Brian Bulcke
- Team MOR: C. J. Gable

Uniform

The 2013 Hamilton Tiger-Cats season was the 56th season for the team in the Canadian Football League (CFL) and their 64th overall. The Tiger-Cats finished in second place in the East Division with a 10–8 record, which was their first winning season since 2004. The Ti-Cats played in their first Grey Cup championship game since 1999, but lost to the hometown Saskatchewan Roughriders 45-23 in the 101st Grey Cup. The Tiger-Cats primarily played their home games at Alumni Stadium in Guelph, Ontario while also playing one game at Moncton Stadium in Moncton, New Brunswick.

== Stadium ==
Due to the demolition of Ivor Wynne Stadium and the construction of Tim Hortons Field on the same site, the Tiger-Cats were forced to play the majority of their home games outside of Hamilton for the first time in franchise history. On November 20, 2012, the Tiger-Cats announced the signing of a memorandum of understanding to play most of their 2013 schedule at a renovated Alumni Stadium in Guelph. The decision came after scouting and considering several other venues within and outside the region. Ron Joyce Stadium, the nearest available stadium, ruled itself out in June 2012.

On March 5, 2013, the 2013 schedule was released, revealing that eight of the regular season games would be played in Guelph and one would be played in Moncton, New Brunswick as part of Touchdown Atlantic. When the Tiger-Cats clinched a home game in the 2013 playoffs, the team announced that that game would also be played in Guelph.

== Offseason ==
=== CFL draft ===
The 2013 CFL draft took place on May 6, 2013. The Tiger-Cats had eight selections in the seven-round draft, including the first overall pick. The club had an additional selection in the fifth round coming from Calgary after a trade for Milton Collins.

Round	Pick	Player	Position	School/Club team
1	1	Linden Gaydosh	DT	Calgary
2	15	Brent Urban	DL	Virginia
3	19	Carl-Olivier Prime	LB	Wagner College
4	35	Simon Le Marquand	WR	Ottawa
5	37	Isaac Dell	FB	Wilfrid Laurier
5	43	Neil King	DB	Saint Mary's
6	45	Michael Daly	DB	McMaster
7	53	Brett Lauther	PK	Saint Mary's

== Preseason ==
Week	Date	Opponent	Score	Result	Attendance	Record
A	Thurs, June 13	at Montreal Alouettes	33–26	Win	20,514	1–0
B	Thurs, June 20	vs. Winnipeg Blue Bombers	52–0	Win	12,732	2–0

== Regular season ==
=== Season standings ===
East Division
Team	GP	W	L	T	PF	PA	Pts	
Toronto Argonauts	18	11	7	0	507	458	22	Details
Hamilton Tiger-Cats	18	10	8	0	453	468	20	Details
Montreal Alouettes	18	8	10	0	459	471	16	Details
Winnipeg Blue Bombers	18	3	15	0	361	585	6	Details

=== Season schedule ===
Week	Date	Opponent	Score	Result	Attendance	Record	TV
1	Fri, June 28	at Toronto Argonauts	39–34	Loss	29,852	0–1	TSN/ESPN3
2	Sun, July 7	vs. Edmonton Eskimos	30–20	Loss	12,612	0–2	TSN/RDS2/ESPN3
3	Sat, July 13	vs. Winnipeg Blue Bombers	25–20	Win	13,085	1–2	TSN/ESPN3
4	Sun, July 21	at Saskatchewan Roughriders	37–0	Loss	37,372	1–3	TSN/ESPN3
5	Sat, July 27	vs. Saskatchewan Roughriders	32–20	Loss	13,002	1–4	TSN/RDS2/ESPN3
6	Fri, Aug 2	at Edmonton Eskimos	30–29	Win	31,006	2–4	TSN/RDS2/NBCSN
7	Bye						
8	Fri, Aug 16	at Winnipeg Blue Bombers	37–18	Win	32,409	3–4	TSN/RDS2/ESPN3
9	Sat, Aug 24	vs. Winnipeg Blue Bombers	37–14	Win	13,138	4–4	TSN/RDS2/ESPN3
10	Fri, Aug 30	at BC Lions	29–26	Loss	30,564	4–5	TSN/RDS2/ESPN3
11	Sat, Sept 7	vs. BC Lions	37–29	Win	13,101	5–5	TSN/ESPN3
12	Fri, Sept 13	at Calgary Stampeders	26–22	Loss	26,649	5–6	TSN/RDS2/ESPN3
13	Sat, Sept 21	vs. Montreal Alouettes	28–26	Win	15,123	6–6	TSN/RDS/ESPN3
14	Sat, Sept 28	vs. Calgary Stampeders	35–11	Loss	13,248	6–7	TSN/ESPN3
15	Fri, Oct 4	at Toronto Argonauts	33–19	Win	28,467	7–7	TSN/ESPN3
16	Mon, Oct 14	vs. Toronto Argonauts	24–18	Win	13,362	8–7	TSN/RDS2/NBCSN
17	Sun, Oct 20	at Montreal Alouettes	36–5	Loss	23,390	8–8	TSN/RDS/ESPN3
18	Sat, Oct 26	vs. Montreal Alouettes	27–24	Win	13,012	9–8	TSN/RDS/ESPN3
19	Sat, Nov 2	at Winnipeg Blue Bombers	37–7	Win	26,316	10–8	TSN/RDS2/ESPN3

== Roster ==
2013 Hamilton Tiger-Cats final roster
Quarterbacks: 1 Henry Burris; 13 Dan LeFevour; 8 Jeremiah Masoli; Running backs: 49 John Delahunt; 30 Dahrran Diedrick; 32 C. J. Gable; 46 C. O. Primé; Receivers: 87 Brandon Banks; 82 Greg Ellingson; 83 Andy Fantuz; 11 Sam Giguère; 84 Bakari Grant; 88 Dave Stala; 17 Luke Tasker	Offensive linemen: 63 Marc Dile T; 67 Peter Dyakowski G; 60 Joel Figueroa T; 62 Marwan Hage C; 55 Tim O'Neill G/C; 66 Greg Wojt G/T; Defensive linemen: 91 Brandon Boudreaux DE; 95 Brian Bulcke DT; 99 Torrey Davis DT; 45 Arnaud Gascon-Nadon DE; 96 Hasan Hazime DT; 93 Terrence Moore DT; 40 Eric Norwood DE	Linebackers: 38 Marcellus Bowman; 28 Jamall Johnson; 21 Simoni Lawrence; 33 Frédéric Plesius; Defensive backs: 3 Marc Beswick; 26 Matt Bucknor; 20 Emanuel Davis; 24 Arthur Hobbs; 43 Neil King; 2 Evan McCollough; 0 Rico Murray; 22 Courtney Stephen; 5 Dee Webb; Special teams: 44 Josh Bartel P; 7 Luca Congi K; 54 Kevin Scott LS	Reserve roster: 27 Delvin Breaux DB; 59 Brian Simmons T; 29 Chevon Walker RB; Practice roster: 98 Mike Atkinson DT; -- LaMark Brown WR; 31 Isaac Dell FB; 68 Mike Filer C/G; 76 Brett Lauther K; 94 Craig Marshall DE/DT; 15 Tavoy Moore RB; 65 Joel Reinders T/G; 47 Louie Richardson LB; 69 Landon Rice G; 64 Carson Rockhill G; 14 James Rogers DB; 42 Ray Shipman LB	Injured list: 12 Brian Brohm QB; 85 Simon Charbonneau-Campeau SB; 51 Marc-Antoine Fortin DE; 41 Erik Harris LB; 57 Cody Husband G; 23 Brandon Isaac LB; 89 Onrea Jones SB; 39 Lindsey Lamar RB; 16 Stephen McGee QB; 19 Harold Mutobola DB; 92 Sam Scott DE; 9 Shomari Williams LB; Suspended: 35 Mike Daly DB; Italics indicate International player

== Playoffs ==
=== Schedule ===
Game	Date	Time	Opponent	Score	Result	Attendance
East Semi-Final	Nov 10	1:00 PM EST	vs. Montreal Alouettes	19–16 (OT)	Win	13,320
East Final	Nov 17	1:00 PM EST	at Toronto Argonauts	36–24	Win	35,418
Grey Cup	Nov 24	6:00 PM EST	Saskatchewan Roughriders	23–45	Loss	44,710

=== East Semi-Final ===
Montreal at Hamilton

Team	1	2	3	4	OT	Total
Alouettes	2	0	7	4	3	16
• Tiger-Cats	0	0	6	7	6	19

- Date: November 10
- Location: Alumni Stadium
  Guelph, ON
- Game start: 1:00 PM EST
- Game attendance: 13,320
- Game weather: Intermittent Rain; −1 °C; wind 45 km/h
- Referee: Al Bradbury
- TV announcers (TSN): Chris Cuthbert (Play by Play), Glen Suitor (Colour), Sara Orlesky (Sideline)

=== East Final ===
Hamilton at Toronto

Team	1	2	3	4	Total
• Tiger-Cats	10	7	10	9	36
Argonauts	7	17	0	0	24

- Date: November 17
- Location: Rogers Centre
  Toronto, ON
- Game start: 1:00 PM EST
- Game attendance: 35,418
- Game weather: None (Closed roof)
- Referee: Glen Johnson
- TV announcers (TSN): Rod Black (Play by Play), Duane Forde (Colour), Sara Orlesky (Sideline), Matthew Scianitti (Sideline)

=== Grey Cup ===
Hamilton vs. Saskatchewan

Team	1	2	3	4	Total
Tiger-Cats	3	3	7	10	23
• Roughriders	7	24	0	14	45

- Date: November 24
- Location: Mosaic Stadium at Taylor Field
  Regina, SK
- Game start: 6:00 PM EST
- Game attendance: 44,710
- Game weather: Clear; 2°C; wind 45-65 km/h
- Referee: Kim Murphy
- TV announcers (TSN): Chris Cuthbert (Play by Play), Glen Suitor (Colour), Sara Orlesky (Sideline), Farhan Lalji (Sideline)
