= List of neutral site Canadian Football League games =

The Canadian Football League (CFL) has staged numerous neutral site games, played outside of both teams' home cities, over its history.

Several neutral site Canadian football games have been staged in the United States – the earliest was in 1909, and the most recent was in 1995.

In the 2005 preseason, and the regular seasons of 2010, 2011, 2013, 2019, 2022 and 2023, games where played in Atlantic Canada which were billed as Touchdown Atlantic. In the 2024 regular season, a game branded as Touchdown Pacific was held in Victoria, British Columbia, between the BC Lions and Ottawa Redblacks.

In 2013, the Hamilton Tiger-Cats played most of their season in Guelph, Ontario, due to the construction of Tim Hortons Field at the site of their former home Ivor Wynne Stadium.

In 2015, CFL games were moved to locations including Fort McMurray, Alberta, as some stadiums were used for the Women's World Cup, Pan-American Games and baseball playoffs.

The Toronto Argonauts and BC Lions relocated home games during the 2026 season, due to their stadiums hosting the 2026 FIFA World Cup. The Lions played two home games in Kelowna, while the Argonauts played three home games in their opposing teams' stadiums, rather than a neutral site.

== Location maps ==
Canadian cities which have hosted neutral site CFL games including:
Playoff games
Regular season games
Exhibition games
See enlargements below
American cities which have hosted neutral site CFL games including:
Regular season Exhibition
Southern Ontario cities which have hosted neutral site CFL games including:
Playoffs
Regular season
Exhibition
Atlantic Canada cities which have hosted neutral site CFL games including:
Regular season Exhibition

== List of games ==
Below is a list of games played by teams from the CFL, and its predecessors the Interprovincial Rugby Football Union and Western Interprovincial Football Union, outside the home city of both teams.

Note: Not included are Grey Cup games, which are held annually at a neutral site. Also not included are interleague games – for example, between CFL and American football teams, or between CFL teams and those of the Ontario Rugby Football Union, Quebec Rugby Football Union or Canadian Intercollegiate Rugby Football Union. These Unions competed for the Grey Cup, or its predecessor the Canadian Dominion Football Championship, in its early years.

Game	Date	Visitor	Score	Home	City	Stadium	Attendance	Ref
Playoff	20 November 1909	Ottawa Rough Riders	14 – 8	Hamilton Tigers	Toronto, Ontario	Rosedale Field	6,000	
Exhibition	11 December 1909	Hamilton Tigers	11 – 6	Ottawa Rough Riders	New York City, New York	Van Cortlandt Park	15,000	
Playoff	18 November 1933	Montreal AAA Winged Wheelers	4 – 5	Toronto Argonauts	Hamilton, Ontario	Hamilton AAA Grounds	3,500	
Regular season	18 October 1941	Toronto Argonauts	12 – 1	Montreal Bulldogs	Kingston, Ontario	Richardson Memorial Stadium	6,000	
Preseason	11 August 1951	Hamilton Tiger-Cats	17 – 11	Toronto Argonauts	Buffalo, New York	Civic Stadium	18,146	
Preseason	2 August 1957	BC Lions	8 – 29	Edmonton Eskimos	Portland, Oregon	Multnomah Stadium	10,261	
Preseason	11 August 1957	BC Lions	6 – 9	Edmonton Eskimos	San Francisco, California	Kezar Stadium	16,000	
Regular season	14 September 1958	Ottawa Rough Riders	18 – 24	Hamilton Tiger-Cats	Philadelphia, Pennsylvania	Municipal Stadium	15,110	
Preseason	29 July 1960	BC Lions	7 – 13	Winnipeg Blue Bombers	Cedar Rapids, Iowa	Kingston Stadium	12,583	
Preseason	29 July 1961	BC Lions	13 – 3	Saskatchewan Roughriders	Seattle, Washington	Husky Stadium	28,000	
Preseason	1 August 1961	Calgary Stampeders	14 – 7	Saskatchewan Roughriders	Spokane, Washington	Memorial Stadium	7,511	
Preseason	15 July 1965	Saskatchewan Roughriders	7 – 24	Calgary Stampeders	Vancouver, British Columbia	Empire Stadium	20,184	
Playoff	19 November 1966	Hamilton Tiger-Cats	16 – 42	Ottawa Rough Riders	Montreal, Quebec	Autostade	20,000	
Preseason	9 July 1967	BC Lions	7 – 2	Edmonton Eskimos	Everett, Washington	Everett Memorial Stadium	6,248	
Preseason	7 June 1986	Winnipeg Blue Bombers	35 – 10	Montreal Alouettes	Saint John, New Brunswick	Canada Games Stadium	11,463	
Preseason	6 June 1987	Hamilton Tiger-Cats	14 – 13	Montreal Alouettes	Saint John, New Brunswick	Canada Games Stadium	8,000	
Preseason	26 June 1988	Winnipeg Blue Bombers	6 – 41	Saskatchewan Roughriders	Saskatoon, Saskatchewan	Gordie Howe Bowl	5,100	
Preseason	25 June 1989	Winnipeg Blue Bombers	7 – 37	Saskatchewan Roughriders	Saskatoon, Saskatchewan	Gordie Howe Bowl	1,500	
Preseason	24 June 1990	Winnipeg Blue Bombers	41 – 40	Saskatchewan Roughriders	Saskatoon, Saskatchewan	Gordie Howe Bowl	4,000	
Preseason	23 June 1991	Winnipeg Blue Bombers	16 – 17	Saskatchewan Roughriders	Saskatoon, Saskatchewan	Gordie Howe Bowl	3,500	
Preseason	25 June 1992	Toronto Argonauts	1 – 20	Calgary Stampeders	Portland, Oregon	Civic Stadium	15,362	
Preseason	24 June 1995	Baltimore CFLers	37 – 0	Birmingham Barracudas	Miami, Florida	Orange Bowl	20,216	
Preseason	21 June 2002	Hamilton Tiger-Cats	37 – 17	Toronto Argonauts	London, Ontario	TD Waterhouse Stadium	9,178	
Preseason	7 June 2003	Ottawa Renegades	23 – 54	Montreal Alouettes	Quebec City, Quebec	PEPS Stadium	10,358	
Preseason	11 June 2005	Hamilton Tiger-Cats	16 – 16	Toronto Argonauts	Halifax, Nova Scotia	Huskies Stadium	11,148	
Regular season	26 September 2010	Edmonton Eskimos	24 – 6	Toronto Argonauts	Moncton, New Brunswick	Moncton Stadium	20,725	
Regular season	25 September 2011	Calgary Stampeders	36 – 55	Hamilton Tiger-Cats	Moncton, New Brunswick	Moncton Stadium	20,153	
Preseason	20 June 2013	Winnipeg Blue Bombers	52 – 0	Hamilton Tiger-Cats	Guelph, Ontario	Alumni Stadium	12,732	
Regular season	7 July 2013	Edmonton Eskimos	30 – 20	Hamilton Tiger-Cats	Guelph, Ontario	Alumni Stadium	12,612	
Regular season	13 July 2013	Winnipeg Blue Bombers	20 – 25	Hamilton Tiger-Cats	Guelph, Ontario	Alumni Stadium	13,085	
Regular season	27 July 2013	Saskatchewan Roughriders	32 – 20	Hamilton Tiger-Cats	Guelph, Ontario	Alumni Stadium	13,002	
Regular season	24 August 2013	Winnipeg Blue Bombers	14 – 37	Hamilton Tiger-Cats	Guelph, Ontario	Alumni Stadium	13,138	
Regular season	7 September 2013	BC Lions	29 – 37	Hamilton Tiger-Cats	Guelph, Ontario	Alumni Stadium	13,101	
Regular season	21 September 2013	Montreal Alouettes	26 – 28	Hamilton Tiger-Cats	Moncton, New Brunswick	Moncton Stadium	15,123	
Regular season	28 September 2013	Calgary Stampeders	35 – 11	Hamilton Tiger-Cats	Guelph, Ontario	Alumni Stadium	13,248	
Regular season	26 October 2013	Montreal Alouettes	24 – 27	Hamilton Tiger-Cats	Guelph, Ontario	Alumni Stadium	13,012	
Playoff	10 November 2013	Montreal Alouettes	16 – 19 (OT)	Hamilton Tiger-Cats	Guelph, Ontario	Alumni Stadium	13,320	
Preseason	13 June 2015	Montreal Alouettes	29 – 6	Ottawa Redblacks	Quebec City, Quebec	Telus Stadium	4,778	
Preseason	13 June 2015	Saskatchewan Roughriders	31 – 24	Edmonton Eskimos	Fort McMurray, Alberta	SMS Equipment Stadium	11,825	
Regular season	27 June 2015	Edmonton Eskimos	11 – 26	Toronto Argonauts	Fort McMurray, Alberta	SMS Equipment Stadium	4,900	
Regular season	17 October 2015	Calgary Stampeders	27 – 15	Toronto Argonauts	Hamilton, Ontario	Tim Hortons Field	3,401	
Regular season	23 October 2015	Montreal Alouettes	34 – 2	Toronto Argonauts	Hamilton, Ontario	Tim Hortons Field	3,741	
Preseason	7 June 2018	Ottawa Redblacks	32 – 17	Toronto Argonauts	Guelph, Ontario	Alumni Stadium	3,921	
Regular season	25 August 2019	Montreal Alouettes	28 – 22	Toronto Argonauts	Moncton, New Brunswick	Moncton Stadium	10,126	
Preseason	3 June 2022	Hamilton Tiger-Cats	17 – 18	Toronto Argonauts	Guelph, Ontario	Alumni Stadium	N/A	
Regular season	16 July 2022	Saskatchewan Roughriders	24 – 30	Toronto Argonauts	Wolfville, Nova Scotia	Raymond Field	10,886	
Preseason	1 June 2023	Ottawa Redblacks	34 – 23	Toronto Argonauts	Guelph, Ontario	Alumni Stadium	2,230	
Regular season	29 July 2023	Saskatchewan Roughriders	13 – 31	Toronto Argonauts	Halifax, Nova Scotia	Huskies Stadium	11,555	
Preseason	1 June 2024	Hamilton Tiger-Cats	14 – 25	Toronto Argonauts	Guelph, Ontario	Alumni Stadium	N/A	
Regular season	31 August 2024	Ottawa Redblacks	12 – 38	BC Lions	Victoria, British Columbia	Royal Athletic Park	14,727	
Preseason	19 May 2025	Calgary Stampeders	26 – 16	BC Lions	Langford, British Columbia	Starlight Stadium	6,000	
Preseason	30 May 2025	Hamilton Tiger-Cats	23 – 30	Toronto Argonauts	Guelph, Ontario	Alumni Stadium	N/A	
Preseason	23 May 2026	Winnipeg Blue Bombers	27 – 31	Saskatchewan Roughriders	Saskatoon, Saskatchewan	Griffiths Stadium	7,654	
Preseason	23 May 2026	Edmonton Elks	34 – 16	BC Lions	Langford, British Columbia	Starlight Stadium	6,126	
Preseason	29 May 2026	Hamilton Tiger-Cats	20 – 14	Toronto Argonauts	Guelph, Ontario	Alumni Stadium	TBD	
Regular season	27 June 2026	Calgary Stampeders	41 – 33	BC Lions	Kelowna, British Columbia	Apple Bowl	TBD	
Regular season	4 July 2026	Edmonton Elks	TBD	BC Lions	Kelowna, British Columbia	Apple Bowl	TBD	

=== Proposed locations ===
In 2018, Mexico was suggested by Commissioner Randy Ambrosie as a possible location for neutral site regular season games (similar to the NFL's Mexico Series), as early as 2019, but these have not happened.

== See also ==
- Touchdown Atlantic
- Canadian Football League in the United States
- CFL USA all-time records and statistics
- List of Canadian Football League stadiums
- Canadian Football League attendance
