= 2015 CFL season =

Canadian Football League season

- Duration: June 25 – November 8, 2015
- East champions: Ottawa Redblacks
- West champions: Edmonton Eskimos

103rd Grey Cup
- Date: November 29, 2015
- Venue: Investors Group Field, Winnipeg
- Champions: Edmonton Eskimos

CFL seasons
- ← 2014 2016 →

Locations of the active CFL teams West East

The 2015 CFL season was the 62nd season of modern-day Canadian football. Officially, it was the 58th Canadian Football League season. The Edmonton Eskimos won the 103rd Grey Cup on November 29, defeating the Ottawa Redblacks 26–20 in Winnipeg. The schedule was released February 13, 2015 and the regular season began on June 25, 2015.

== CFL news in 2015 ==
=== Salary cap ===
According to the new collective bargaining agreement, the 2015 salary cap was set at $5,050,000 (average of $109,782 per active roster spot). As per the agreement, the cap is fixed and will not vary with league revenue performance. The base individual minimum salary was set at $51,000.

=== Season schedule ===
The 2015 season schedule was released on February 13, 2015, with the regular season opening on June 25, 2015 at Percival Molson Memorial Stadium in Montreal, Quebec. It was the first time that Montreal had hosted the season opener since the 2011 CFL season. The major complication this year was the lack of available stadium dates due to the 2015 FIFA Women's World Cup and the 2015 Pan Am Games occurring over the entire CFL pre-season and first five weeks of the regular season, affecting five member clubs. The BC Lions, Edmonton Eskimos, and Ottawa Redblacks played pre-season games away from their regular stadiums and in some instances, in different cities. The Hamilton Tiger-Cats did not play a regular season home game until week 6 and the Argonauts did not play in Toronto for a regular season game until week 7.

Following three straight years of intra-division matchups in the last week of the regular season (and for the last two years, those same matchups in the last four weeks), the league featured inter-division games in the last week. There was also a Sunday game in the last week of the regular season which hadn't occurred since the 2010 CFL season. This season featured seven home-and-home series, up from two from the previous year. Despite Ottawa returning to the league, they did not play the Montreal Alouettes on Labour Day weekend, which is the first time since 2002 where both teams played in the league but did not play that same weekend. There were 15 double headers this year, with four on Fridays, nine on Saturdays, one on Sundays, and one on Labour Day Monday. The league also experimented with games regularly featured on Thursday nights, with one game every Thursday for 10 of the first 11 weeks of the season. The Thanksgiving Day Classic featured just one game for the first time since 1997, which is ironic in that it was the only week of the season with five games being played. For the second straight year, there was no Touchdown Atlantic contest.

=== Hall of Fame ===
The Canadian Football Hall of Fame game took place on August 22, 2015, featuring the Saskatchewan Roughriders hosting the Calgary Stampeders. Dave Dickenson, Gene Makowsky, Eddie Davis, and Leroy Blugh were inducted as players while Bob O'Billovich, Bob Wetenhall, and Larry Reda joined as builders. Dickenson played for five seasons for the Stampeders and will be coaching in the game, while Makowsky played his entire 17-year career with the Roughriders. Davis played for five years with the Stampeders and nine with the Roughriders, winning Grey Cup championships with both teams.

=== Northern Kickoff ===
On June 14, 2013, it was announced that the Edmonton Eskimos would host their 2015 preseason game at the new SMS Stadium at Shell Place in Fort McMurray against the Saskatchewan Roughriders on June 13, 2015. As part of the deal, the game was broadcast nationally on TSN, with a start time of 8:00pm MDT. The game was played here to broaden the Eskimos' fanbase and to allow Commonwealth Stadium (the Eskimos' usual home) to host 2015 FIFA Women's World Cup. Attendance for the game was 11,825 fans (3,175 short of a sellout).

Fort McMurray also hosted a Toronto Argonauts regular season home game. This was done due to the Argonauts' usual home stadium, Rogers Centre, being unavailable because of the 2015 Pan Am Games and Toronto Blue Jays occupying all dates in the month of July. This was the first regular season game played in Fort McMurray and is the most northerly regular season game in CFL history. The Toronto Argonauts defeated the Edmonton Eskimos 26–11 in front of a dismal attendance of only 4,900 fans (only 32.6% sold out), a low figure not seen for a regular season game since the days of the Las Vegas Posse.

Fort McMurray was also considered as a host site for the BC Lions' pre-season game against Edmonton, because they also had to vacate their stadium for the Women's World Cup, but the Lions instead opted to hold that game in Thunderbird Stadium, a much closer but smaller venue, for that contest.

=== Quebec City preseason game ===
On June 13, 2015, the Ottawa Redblacks and the Montreal Alouettes played a preseason game in Quebec City, at the 12,257-seat Telus Stadium. Like other venue changes early in the season, this was to accommodate the 2015 FIFA Women's World Cup. This was the second time an Ottawa CFL franchise played a preseason game in Quebec City; the Renegades played the Alouettes in front of 10,358 fans at Stade PEPS (now Stade TELUS-Université Laval) on June 7, 2003. The Montreal Alouettes defeated the Ottawa Redblacks 29–6 in front of 4,778 fans.

=== Coaching changes ===
Following the 2014 season, the BC Lions parted ways with Mike Benevides, who had been the head coach of the Lions since 2012. In those three seasons, Benevides posted a record of 33–21 in the regular season and 0–3 in the post-season. The Lions hired Jeff Tedford as their new head coach. Tedford played quarterback in the CFL in the 1980s and was the head coach of the University of California football team from 2002 through 2012. On August 21, 2015, Alouettes ownership relieved Tom Higgins of his coaching duties and brought general manager Jim Popp to the bench for the fourth time.

=== New CFL commissioner ===
Nearing the end of the 2014 CFL season, Mark Cohon announced that he would be stepping down from his position as CFL commissioner. Cohon had been the CFL commissioner since 2007, which was the third longest tenure in league history. On January 9, 2015, his term came to an end and Jim Lawson (the chairman of the CFL's board of governors) became the interim commissioner while the CFL's board of governors searched for a new commissioner. On March 17, 2015, Jeffrey Orridge was announced as the new commissioner of the CFL. Orridge assumed office on April 29, 2015. Most recently, Orridge had been employed by the CBC as their Executive Director of Sports and General Manager from April 2011 to March 2015.

=== Sale of the Toronto Argonauts ===
Two of the principals of Maple Leaf Sports & Entertainment (Kilmer Sports and Bell Canada) announced its intent to acquire the Toronto Argonauts prior to the 2015 season, acquiring the team from BC Lions owner David Braley and ending the last remaining cross-ownership situation in professional football. (The third principal of MLSE, Rogers Communications, declined to acquire a stake. Because Bell already owned exclusive TV rights to the entire league and radio rights to the Argonauts, Rogers had no interest in buying a stake in a team that it could not broadcast.)

The sale means that 2015 will likely be the last season for the Argonauts in the Rogers Centre, where the team has had difficulties selling tickets; as soon as 2016, the team will move to MLSE-operated BMO Field, currently a soccer-specific stadium, which will be renovated to accommodate the CFL. The Argonauts were forced to move some home games out of the Rogers Centre because the Toronto Blue Jays, primary tenants of the Rogers Centre, made the playoffs in 2015. MLSE and Braley pursued backup plans in the event the Blue Jays have to schedule playoff games on weeks the Argonauts are set to play; the team considered stadiums such as Tim Hortons Field in Hamilton, Alumni Stadium in Guelph, and even UB Stadium in Buffalo, New York, USA as potential venues but ultimately rejected all of them, opting to play their October 6 home game against the Ottawa Redblacks in the home stadium of their opponent because it was "CFL-ready and TV-ready." The Argonauts would move their October 17 and 23 home game to Tim Hortons Field.

=== Broadcasting changes ===
This was the eighth season in which The Sports Network maintained an exclusive partnership with the CFL for television rights. Beginning this season, TSN branded its Thursday night broadcasts as Thursday Night Football (unrelated to the National Football League package of the same name) and featured a more entertainment-oriented focus.

The Hamilton Tiger-Cats ended their longtime relationship with former flagship radio station CHML, the team's home continuously since 1984 and intermittently since 1950, and began a joint venture with crosstown rival CKOC. The Tiger-Cats/CKOC venture saw that station (at the time carrying oldies/classic hits) transformed into Hamilton's first all-sports radio outlet, carrying TSN Radio programming.

=== Rule changes ===
In March the CFL's Rules Committee submitted a variety of rule changes to the Board of Governors be implemented for the 2015 season: On April 8, 2015, the league's Board of Governors approved most of the proposed changes.

==== Accepted ====
- Two-point conversions will be attempted from the three-yard line and traditional single-point converts will be attempted from the 25-yard line (making for a 32-yard kick). This is similar to a rule change attempted by the National Football League, and the Fall Experimental Football League in 2014, and adopted by the NFL in 2015.
- Defenders are only allowed to contact receivers within five yards of the line of scrimmage, similar to a rule adopted by the NFL in 1978 to increase offence. However, the penalty does not result in a first down, like the NFL rule.
- If a no-yards penalty is called after a kicked ball hits the ground, the penalty will be automatically tacked onto the end of the play.
- Offences are now allowed to indicate to the officials when they are in a hurry-up offence and will not be substituting players, allowing the officials to make adjustments to the chain crew more quickly.
- Coaches are disallowed from asking the official for a measurement.
- During punts, players on the offensive line are not allowed to leave the line of scrimmage until after the punt has been executed.
- On kickoffs that go out of bounds, the receiving team is no longer allowed to request the kicking team kick again.

==== Rejected ====
- Adding a three-point conversion from the ten-yard line, a scheme last used in the Stars Football League, the old XFL playoffs, and the second, reformed XFL. This proposal would have only been tested during the preseason.
- Offensive pass interference to be subject to video review.

=== Eastern resurgence ===
The East Division finished with a collective record of better than .500 for the first time since 2004.

=== New logo ===
On November 27, 2015, two days before the 103rd Grey Cup game, the CFL introduced its newest logo, its fourth in league history: A silver football-shaped design, with three laces signifying the three downs used in Canadian football on top, 'CFL' in block letters in the centre, and a half maple-leaf on the bottom. It replaces the 'leaf/football' logo that had been used since 2002.

== Regular season ==
=== Structure ===
Teams play eighteen regular season games, playing two divisional opponents three times and all of the other teams twice. Teams are awarded two points for a win and one point for a tie. The top three teams in each division qualify for the playoffs, with the first place team gaining a bye to the divisional finals. A fourth place team in one division may qualify ahead of the third place team in the other division (the "Crossover"), if they earn more points in the season. If a third-place team finishes in a tie with the fourth place team in the other division, the third place team automatically gets the playoff spot and there is no crossover.

If two or more teams in the same division are equal in points, the following tiebreakers apply:

1. Most wins in all games
2. Head to head winning percentage (matches won divided by all matches played)
3. Head to head points difference
4. Head to head points ratio
5. Tiebreakers 3–5 applied sequentially to all divisional games
6. Tiebreakers 4 and 5 applied sequentially to all league games
7. Coin toss

Notes:

- 1. If two clubs remain tied after other club(s) are eliminated during any step, tie breakers reverts to step 2.

=== Standings ===
Note: GP = Games Played, W = Wins, L = Losses, T = Ties, PF = Points For, PA = Points Against, Pts = Points

Teams in bold are in playoff positions.

West Division
Team	GP	W	L	PF	PA	Pts	
**Edmonton Eskimos**	18	14	4	466	341	28	Details
**Calgary Stampeders**	18	14	4	478	346	28	Details
**BC Lions**	18	7	11	437	486	14	Details
Winnipeg Blue Bombers	18	5	13	353	502	10	Details
Saskatchewan Roughriders	18	3	15	430	563	6	Details

East Division
Team	GP	W	L	PF	PA	Pts	
**Ottawa Redblacks**	18	12	6	464	454	24	Details
**Hamilton Tiger-Cats**	18	10	8	530	391	20	Details
**Toronto Argonauts**	18	10	8	438	499	20	Details
Montreal Alouettes	18	6	12	388	402	12	Details

- Edmonton finished 1st place in the West Division because they won their 3 game regular season series against Calgary (2–1).
- Hamilton finished 2nd place in the East Division because they won their 3 game regular season series against Toronto (3–0).

== CFL playoffs ==
For the first time since the 1983 season, all three of the CFL's Ontario-based teams qualified for the playoffs. The Eskimos won their 14th Grey Cup championship in franchise history, and their first since 2005. Mike Reilly was named Most Valuable Player after completing 21 of 35 pass attempts for 269 yards with two touchdown passes. He was also Edmonton's leading rusher at 66 yards. Shamawd Chambers, who missed the majority of the 2015 season with a knee injury, received the Dick Suderman Trophy as Most Valuable Canadian.

=== Playoff bracket ===
November 15: Division Semi-Finals
East
E3	Toronto Argonauts	22
E2	Hamilton Tiger-Cats	25
West
W3	B.C. Lions	9
W2	Calgary Stampeders	35

November 22: Division Finals
E2	Hamilton Tiger-Cats	28
E1	Ottawa Redblacks	35
W2	Calgary Stampeders	31
W1	Edmonton Eskimos	45

November 29: 103rd Grey Cup; Investors Group Field – Winnipeg
E1	Ottawa Redblacks	20
W1	Edmonton Eskimos	26

== Award winners ==
The CFL changed their weekly awards format beginning with the 2015 season. The CFL now awards the top three players on performance, regardless of position or nationality. They also continued to award players on a monthly basis based on their performance within a set month.

=== CFL Top Performers of the Week ===
Week	First	Second	Third	Fans' Choice
One	Trevor Harris	Jeff Fuller	Drew Willy	Drew Willy
Two	Rakeem Cato	Ryan Smith	Trevor Harris	Ryan Smith
Three	Travis Lulay	S. J. Green	Weston Dressler	Weston Dressler
Four	Shakir Bell	Jon Cornish	Marcus Howard	Shakir Bell
Five	Henry Burris	Aston Whiteside	Chris Williams	Henry Burris
Six	Drew Willy	Patrick Watkins	Marquay McDaniel	Drew Willy
Seven	Emanuel Davis	Andrew Harris	Keith Shologan	Emanuel Davis
Eight	Bo Levi Mitchell	Zach Collaros	Eric Norwood	Bo Levi Mitchell
Nine	Mike Daly	Zach Collaros	Terrell Sinkfield	Zach Collaros
Ten	James Franklin	Kendial Lawrence	Derel Walker	James Franklin
Eleven	Zach Collaros	Charleston Hughes	Terrell Sinkfield	Zach Collaros
Twelve	Mike Reilly	Jeremiah Johnson	Adarius Bowman	Jeremiah Johnson
Thirteen	Henry Burris	Chris Rainey	Stefan Logan	Henry Burris
Fourteen	Macho Harris	Marquay McDaniel	Derel Walker	Macho Harris
Fifteen	Henry Burris	Jonathon Jennings	Mic'hael Brooks	Henry Burris
Sixteen	Trevor Harris	Jeff Mathews	Emmanuel Arceneaux	Jeff Mathews
Seventeen	Adarius Bowman	Henry Burris	Brandon Smith	Adarius Bowman
Eighteen	Adarius Bowman	Henry Burris	Mike Reilly	Henry Burris
Nineteen	Derel Walker	Shawn Lemon	Mike Reilly	Shawn Lemon
Twenty	Henry Burris	Greg Ellingson	John Bowman	

=== CFL Top Performers of the Month ===
Month	First	Second	Third
July	Trevor Harris	Marcus Howard	Rakeem Cato
August	Zach Collaros	Derel Walker	Eric Norwood
September	Henry Burris	Chris Rainey	Jamaal Westerman
October	Henry Burris	Mike Reilly	Adarius Bowman

== 2015 CFL All-Stars ==
=== Offence ===
- QB – Henry Burris, Ottawa Redblacks
- RB – Tyrell Sutton, Montreal Alouettes
- RB – Andrew Harris, BC Lions
- R – Eric Rogers, Calgary Stampeders
- R – Adarius Bowman, Edmonton Eskimos
- R – Derel Walker, Edmonton Eskimos
- R – Emmanuel Arceneaux, BC Lions
- OT – Jovan Olafioye, BC Lions
- OT – SirVincent Rogers, Ottawa Redblacks
- OG – Brendon LaBatte, Saskatchewan Roughriders
- OG – Spencer Wilson, Calgary Stampeders
- OC – Jon Gott, Ottawa Redblacks

=== Defence ===
- DT – Almondo Sewell, Edmonton Eskimos
- DT – Ted Laurent, Hamilton Tiger-Cats
- DE – Jamaal Westerman, Winnipeg Blue Bombers
- DE – John Bowman, Montreal Alouettes
- LB – Adam Bighill, BC Lions
- LB – Winston Venable, Montreal Alouettes
- LB – Simoni Lawrence, Hamilton Tiger-Cats
- CB – Abdul Kanneh, Ottawa Redblacks
- CB – John Ojo, Edmonton Eskimos
- DB – Emanuel Davis, Hamilton Tiger-Cats
- DB – Aaron Grymes, Edmonton Eskimos
- S – Craig Butler, Hamilton Tiger-Cats

=== Special teams ===
- K – Rene Paredes, Calgary Stampeders
- P – Richie Leone, BC Lions
- ST – Brandon Banks, Hamilton Tiger-Cats

== 2015 CFL Western All-Stars ==
=== Offence ===
- QB – Bo Levi Mitchell, Calgary Stampeders
- RB – Jerome Messam, Calgary Stampeders
- RB – Andrew Harris, BC Lions
- R – Eric Rogers, Calgary Stampeders
- R – Adarius Bowman, Edmonton Eskimos
- R – Derel Walker, Edmonton Eskimos
- R – Emmanuel Arceneaux, BC Lions
- OT – Jovan Olafioye, BC Lions
- OT – D'Anthony Batiste, Edmonton Eskimos
- OG – Brendon LaBatte, Saskatchewan Roughriders
- OG – Spencer Wilson, Calgary Stampeders
- OC – Pierre Lavertu, Calgary Stampeders

=== Defence ===
- DT – Almondo Sewell, Edmonton Eskimos
- DT – Mic'hael Brooks, BC Lions
- DE – Jamaal Westerman, Winnipeg Blue Bombers
- DE – Charleston Hughes, Calgary Stampeders
- LB – Adam Bighill, BC Lions
- LB – Jeff Knox Jr., Saskatchewan Roughriders
- LB – Dexter McCoil, Edmonton Eskimos
- CB – Johnny Adams, Winnipeg Blue Bombers
- CB – John Ojo, Edmonton Eskimos
- DB – Ryan Phillips, BC Lions
- DB – Aaron Grymes, Edmonton Eskimos
- S – Josh Bell, Calgary Stampeders

=== Special teams ===
- K – Rene Paredes, Calgary Stampeders
- P – Richie Leone, BC Lions
- ST – Bo Lokombo, BC Lions

== 2015 CFL Eastern All-Stars ==
=== Offence ===
- QB – Henry Burris, Ottawa Redblacks
- RB – Brandon Whitaker, Toronto Argonauts
- RB – Tyrell Sutton, Montreal Alouettes
- R – S. J. Green, Montreal Alouettes
- R – Chris Williams, Ottawa Redblacks
- R – Luke Tasker, Hamilton Tiger-Cats
- R – Brad Sinopoli, Ottawa Redblacks
- OT – SirVincent Rogers, Ottawa Redblacks
- OT – Jeff Perrett, Montreal Alouettes
- OG – Greg Van Roten, Toronto Argonauts
- OG – Ryan Bomben, Hamilton Tiger-Cats
- OC – Jon Gott, Ottawa Redblacks

=== Defence ===
- DT – Ted Laurent, Hamilton Tiger-Cats
- DT – Cleyon Laing, Toronto Argonauts
- DE – Justin Capicciotti, Ottawa Redblacks
- DE – John Bowman, Montreal Alouettes
- LB – Winston Venable, Montreal Alouettes
- LB – Simoni Lawrence, Hamilton Tiger-Cats
- LB – Greg Jones, Toronto Argonauts
- CB – Abdul Kanneh, Ottawa Redblacks
- CB – Jovon Johnson, Ottawa Redblacks
- DB – Emanuel Davis, Hamilton Tiger-Cats
- DB – Jerrell Gavins, Ottawa Redblacks
- S – Craig Butler, Hamilton Tiger-Cats

=== Special teams ===
- K – Justin Medlock, Hamilton Tiger-Cats
- P – Boris Bede, Montreal Alouettes
- ST – Brandon Banks, Hamilton Tiger-Cats

== 2015 CFL awards ==
- CFL's Most Outstanding Player Award – Henry Burris (QB), Ottawa Redblacks
- CFL's Most Outstanding Canadian Award – Brad Sinopoli (R), Ottawa Redblacks
- CFL's Most Outstanding Defensive Player Award – Adam Bighill (LB), BC Lions
- CFL's Most Outstanding Offensive Lineman Award – SirVincent Rogers (OT), Ottawa Redblacks
- CFL's Most Outstanding Rookie Award – Derel Walker (R), Edmonton Eskimos
- John Agro Special Teams Award – Brandon Banks (R), Hamilton Tiger-Cats
- Tom Pate Memorial Award – Henry Burris (QB), Ottawa Redblacks
- Jake Gaudaur Veterans' Trophy – Jeff Perrett (OT), Montreal Alouettes
- Annis Stukus Trophy – Rick Campbell, Ottawa Redblacks
- Commissioner's Award – Bernie Custis, CFL's first Black Quarterback
- Hugh Campbell Distinguished Leadership Award – Bob Irving, voice of Winnipeg Blue Bombers
