= Matt Bucknor =

Canadian football player (born 1985)

No. 2, 20, 28, 7
- Position: Defensive back

Personal information
- Born: June 30, 1985 (age 41); Hamilton, Ontario, Canada
- Listed height: 5 ft 11 in (1.80 m)
- Listed weight: 190 lb (86 kg)

Career information
- High school: Hill Park Secondary
- College: Windsor
- CFL draft: 2010: undrafted

Career history
- 2012–2013: Hamilton Tiger-Cats
- 2014–2015: Winnipeg Blue Bombers
- 2016: Calgary Stampeders
- 2017: BC Lions
- Stats at CFL.ca

Matt Bucknor (born June 30, 1985) is a Canadian former professional football cornerback who played in the Canadian Football League (CFL). He was signed as an undrafted free agent by the Hamilton Tiger-Cats on May 30, 2012 and played for the club for two years before being traded to the Winnipeg Blue Bombers. He was released by the Blue Bombers on June 18, 2016. He signed with the BC Lions on February 16, 2017. Bucknor was released by the Lions on May 9, 2018. He played CIS Football for the Windsor Lancers.
