= Harold Mutobola =

Canadian football player (born 1989)

Profile
- Positions: Running back, Defensive back

Personal information
- Born: December 19, 1989 (age 36); Congo, Africa
- Listed height: 6 ft 1 in (1.85 m)
- Listed weight: 190 lb (86 kg)

Career information
- College: Western

Career history
- 2013–2014: Hamilton Tiger-Cats
- 2014: Toronto Argonauts*
- 2015: Edmonton Eskimos*
- * Offseason or practice squad member only
- Stats at CFL.ca (archive)

Harold Mutobola (born December 19, 1989) is a Canadian football running back for the Edmonton Eskimos in the Canadian Football League. He previously played for the Hamilton Tiger-Cats as a defensive back in 2013. He played college football at Western.

== College career ==
Mutobola was a defensive back for the Western Ontario Mustangs from 2008-2012. In his five seasons at Western, he recorded 39 tackles, an interception, and eight pass break-ups. In his breakout 2012 season, he had 21 tackles, an interception, and six pass break-ups, which resulted in him being named a first-team OUA all-star.

== Professional career ==
On April 4, 2013, Mutobola was signed as an undrafted free agent by the Hamilton Tiger-Cats to play at the defensive back position. He spent time on the practice squad until August 15, when he was moved to the active roster. He played in Week 8 against the Toronto Argonauts, where he recorded a special teams tackle. He received a season-ending knee injury in Week 9, after which the Tiger-Cats moved him to the injured list. He was later dropped by the team on June 16, 2014. He briefly appeared on the Tiger-Cats' practice squad from July 28 to September 16. Later in the 2014 season, he appeared on the Toronto Argonauts' practice squad from October 20 to October 28.

Mutobola was signed as a free agent by the Edmonton Eskimos on May 30, 2015 as a running back, the first time he had played at this position professionally.
