= John Ojo =

American football player (born 1990)

No. 26
- Position: Cornerback

Personal information
- Born: March 2, 1990 (age 36); Tallahassee, Florida, U.S.
- Listed height: 6 ft 3 in (1.91 m)
- Listed weight: 205 lb (93 kg)

Career information
- High school: Tallahassee
- College: Florida A&M
- NFL draft: 2014: undrafted

Career history
- Edmonton Eskimos (2014–2016); New York Jets (2017)*; Saskatchewan Roughriders (2018)*
- * Offseason or practice squad member only

Awards and highlights
- Grey Cup champion (2015); CFL All-Star (2015)

Career CFL statistics
- Tackles: 41
- Interceptions: 5
- Stats at CFL.ca

John Ojo (born March 2, 1990) is an American former professional football player who was a cornerback for the Edmonton Eskimos of the Canadian Football League (CFL). He made his professional debut for the Eskimos in 2014 after playing college football for the Florida A&M Rattlers. He was also a member of the New York Jets of the National Football League (NFL) and the CFL's Saskatchewan Roughriders.

== Early career ==
Ojo played high school football at Florida State University School (Florida High), where he played as both a receiver and safety. In his senior season, he finished with five touchdowns on offense and six interceptions on defense.

Starting in 2008, Ojo played college football for the Florida A&M Rattlers as a safety. After suffering a broken ankle in his first game with the Rattlers, Ojo received redshirt status and did not play for the rest of the 2008 season. He started at the free safety position for the first time in 2009. He was named to the All Mid-Eastern Athletic Conference first-team in 2011. In the second game of the 2012 season, he received a metatarsophalangeal joint sprain, also known as turf toe, which ended his season. He was again able to obtain redshirt status, preserving his final year of eligibility. Ojo played his last year with the Rattlers in 2013 as a sixth-year senior. He finished his college career with at least 131 tackles, seven interceptions, and six pass break ups.

== Professional career ==
Ojo was eligible for the 2014 NFL draft, but went undrafted. He was invited to try out for the Seattle Seahawks in May 2014, but was not signed to the team.

=== Edmonton Eskimos ===
John Ojo was signed by the Edmonton Eskimos (CFL) to their practice squad on October 9 and was released a month later. Ojo was again signed by the Edmonton Eskimos on April 29, 2015. On June 21, Ojo was dropped from the active roster and added to the practice squad among the final round of roster changes in the preseason. He was moved back to the active roster on June 26, and made his CFL debut in the season opener against the Toronto Argonauts on June 27, 2015, where he recorded 2 tackles and recovered a fumble. In the Eskimos' home opener against the Ottawa Redblacks, Ojo caught an interception and returned it 57 yards for a touchdown, adding four tackles. Over the course of the season, Ojo became a more prominent member of the Eskimos defense, eventually contributing 41 tackles, 8 special teams tackles and 5 interceptions, one of which he returned for a touchdown. During preseason Ojo ruptured an Achilles tendon in practice and missed the entire 2016 season. Following the 2016 season he was not re-signed by the Eskimos and became a free agent on February 14, 2017.

As of mid February 2017, Ojo's recovery was set to be completed by the end of March 2017, and he reportedly had up to eight NFL workouts lined up.

=== New York Jets ===
On April 7, 2017, Ojo signed with the New York Jets. On May 5, 2017, he was waived by the Jets.

=== Saskatchewan Roughriders ===
Ojo returned to the CFL on March 26, 2018, when he signed with the Saskatchewan Roughriders. Ojo was released by the Riders at the start of training camp on May 22, 2018.
