= Abdul Kanneh =

English gridiron football player (born 1990)

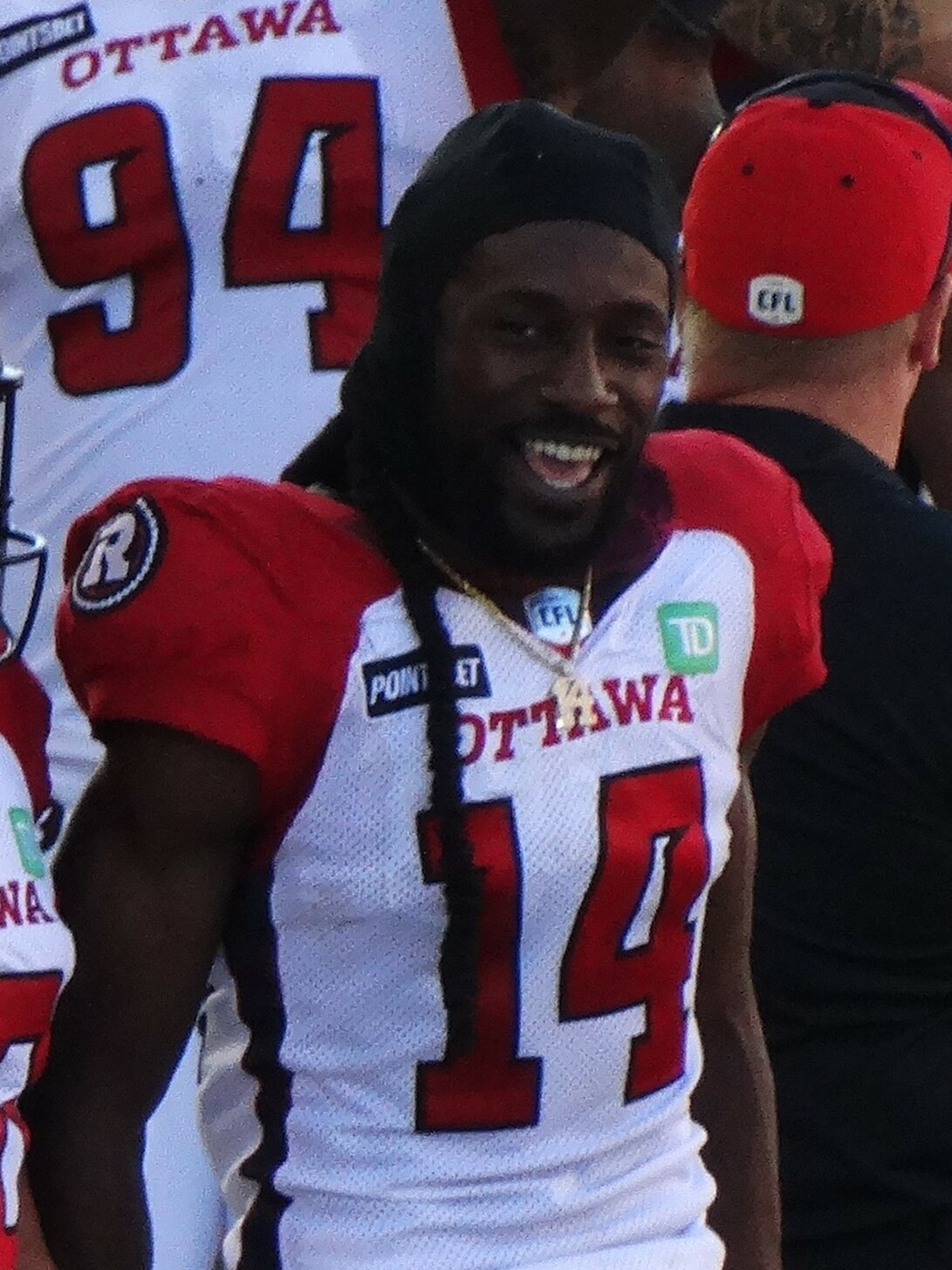
- Kanneh with the Ottawa Redblacks in 2022

No. 14
- Position: Defensive back

Personal information
- Born: September 3, 1990 (age 36); London, England
- Listed height: 5 ft 10 in (1.78 m)
- Listed weight: 185 lb (84 kg)

Career information
- College: New Mexico Highlands

Career history
- 2013: Cleveland Browns*
- 2014: Orlando Predators
- 2014–2016: Ottawa Redblacks
- 2017: Hamilton Tiger-Cats
- 2018–2019: Toronto Argonauts
- 2020–2023: Ottawa Redblacks
- * Offseason or practice squad member only

Awards and highlights
- Grey Cup champion (2016); CFL All-Star (2015); 2× CFL East All-Star (2015, 2016)
- Stats at CFL.ca

Abdul Kanneh (born September 3, 1990) is an English professional Canadian football defensive back. He has played in the Canadian Football League (CFL) for the Ottawa RedBlacks, Hamilton Tiger-Cats, and Toronto Argonauts. He played college football at New Mexico Highlands University.

== Professional career ==
=== Cleveland Browns ===
Kanneh was signed by the Cleveland Browns in 2013 as an undrafted free agent. He was later cut by the Browns during the 2013 training camp.

=== Ottawa Redblacks (first stint) ===
In 2014, Kanneh signed a contract with the Ottawa Redblacks of the CFL and played three years for the team, winning his first Grey Cup championship in 2016.

=== Hamilton Tiger-Cats ===
The Hamilton Tiger-Cats signed Kanneh to their roster in 2017, but his injury-plagued campaign led to him only dressing in seven games that year.

=== Toronto Argonauts ===
On the day of 2018 training camp cuts, on June 10, 2018, Kanneh was traded to the Toronto Argonauts for an eighth-round pick in the 2019 CFL draft. He played in 24 games for the Argonauts over two years, recording 95 defensive tackles, one sack, and one interception. He became a free agent in 2020.

=== Ottawa Redblacks (second stint) ===
Upon entering free agency, Kanneh signed with his original CFL team, the Redblacks, on February 11, 2020, to a one-year contract. He re-signed with Ottawa on January 25, 2021. Kanneh played in eight games for the Redblacks in 2021, contributing with 28 defensive tackles, three interceptions and one touchdown. Kanneh and Ottawa agreed to a contract extension on February 1, 2022.

Kanneh played in 12 regular season games in 2022 where he had 37 defensive tackles, two interceptions, and one forced fumble. In 2023, he again played in 12 regular season games and recorded 39 defensive tackles and one interception. He became a free agent on February 13, 2024.
