= Joshua Josephs =

American football player (born 2003)

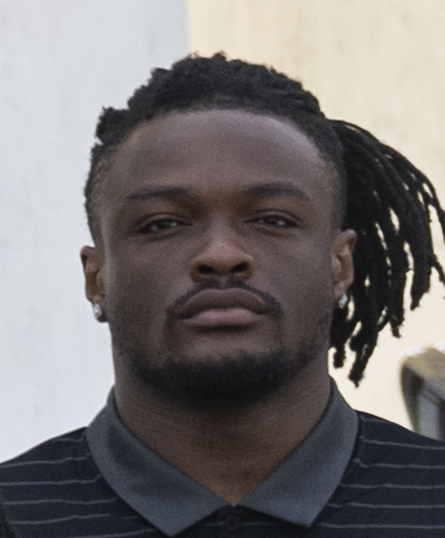
- Josephs in 2026

No. 48 – Washington Commanders
- Position: Outside linebacker
- Roster status: Active

Personal information
- Born: December 8, 2003 (age 22)
- Listed height: 6 ft 3 in (1.91 m)
- Listed weight: 240 lb (109 kg)

Career information
- High school: North Cobb (Atlanta, Georgia)
- College: Tennessee (2022–2025)
- NFL draft: 2026: 5th round, 147th overall pick

Career history
- Washington Commanders (2026–present)
- Stats at Pro Football Reference

Joshua Kalebe Josephs (born December 8, 2003) is an American professional football outside linebacker for the Washington Commanders of the National Football League (NFL). Josephs played college football for the Tennessee Volunteers and was selected by the Commanders in the fifth round of the 2026 NFL draft.

== Early life ==
Josephs was born on December 8, 2003, and grew up in Kennesaw, Georgia, as the son of Jamaican immigrants. He attended North Cobb High School in Atlanta, where he played football as a linebacker. He totaled 98 tackles, seven tackles-for-loss (TFLs) and four sacks as a junior in 2020, then made 121 tackles, 22 TFLs and eight sacks as a senior in 2021, being named the Cobb County Defensive Player of the Year for his performance. He was also a team captain, first-team all-county and first-team all-state selection at North Cobb. A four-star recruit, he committed to play college football for the Tennessee Volunteers.

== College career ==
As a true freshman at Tennessee in 2022, Josephs totaled 12 tackles, 2.5 TFLs and a sack while playing as a backup defensive end. He then had 20 tackles, 4.5 TFLs and three sacks as a sophomore in 2023. As a junior in 2024, he totaled 39 tackles, nine TFLs and 1.5 sacks, having the highest grade among Tennessee defensive players as judged by Pro Football Focus (PFF). He returned to Tennessee for his senior season in 2025. During his senior season, Josephs was more of a situational pass rusher finishing with a 16.8% pressure rate, 4 QB hits and 4 sacks and three forced fumbles. After the regular season finale, Josephs declared for the 2026 NFL draft.

== Professional career ==
Pre-draft measurables
Height	Weight	Arm length	Hand span	Wingspan	40-yard dash	10-yard split	20-yard split	Vertical jump	Broad jump
6 ft 3 1/8 in (1.91 m)	242 lb (110 kg)	34 1/4 in (0.87 m)	10 in (0.25 m)	6 ft 11 7/8 in (2.13 m)	4.73 s	1.68 s	2.70 s	38.5 in (0.98 m)	10 ft 9 in (3.28 m)
All values from NFL Combine/Pro Day

Josephs was selected by the Washington Commanders in the fifth round with the 147th overall pick of the 2026 NFL draft, signing his four-year rookie contract on May 8, 2026.
