= North Cobb High School =

Public high school in Kennesaw, Georgia, United States

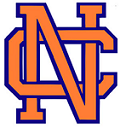

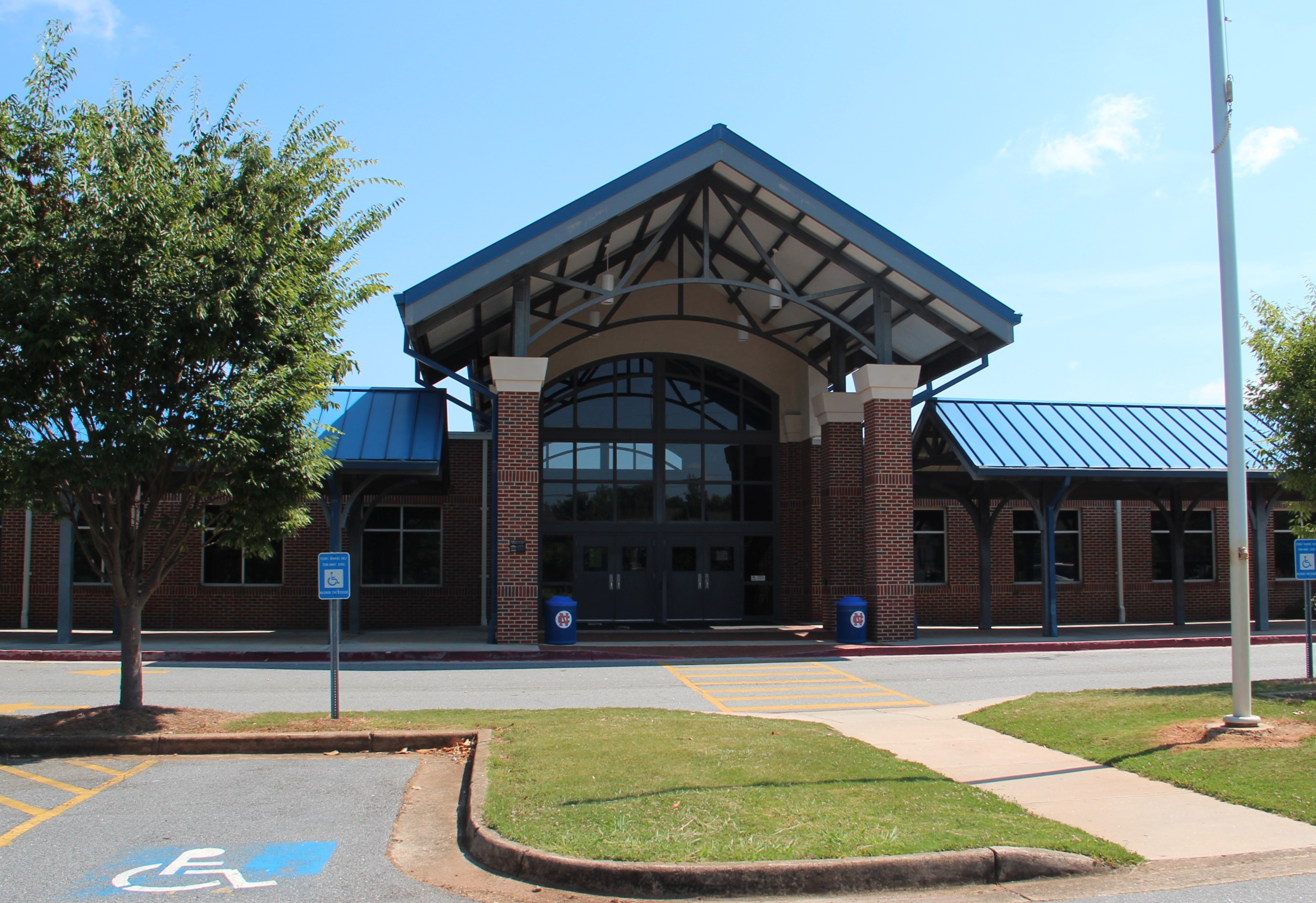

Location
- 3400 State Highway 293 North; Kennesaw, Georgia 30144; United States; 34°2′21″N 84°38′54″W

Information
- Type: Public high school
- Established: 1958; 68 years ago
- School district: Cobb County School District
- Principal: David Bell
- Teaching staff: 142.40 (FTE)
- Enrollment: 2,521 (2023–2024)
- Student to teacher ratio: 17.70
- Colors: Orange, white and navy
- Nickname: Warriors
- Newspaper: The Chant
- Yearbook: Panorama
- Website: www.cobbk12.org/northcobb/

North Cobb High School is a public high school located north of Atlanta in Kennesaw, Georgia, United States. It serves approximately 2900 students in the Cobb County School District, with classes from grades 9 to 12. The school mascot is the warrior and the official school colors are orange and white. North Cobb is the second largest school in the district.

North Cobb was established in 1958, replacing Acworth High School, and is one of the oldest high schools in Cobb County. North Cobb has a magnet program designated for international studies.

In 2016, North Cobb was named an International Skills Diploma School by the Georgia Department of Education. An on-campus preschool provides field experience for students interested in pursuing early childhood education. North Cobb offers Advanced Placement programs such as AP Human Geography, AP Language, AP United States History, AP Chemistry, AP Biology, AP European History, AP Seminar, AP World History: Modern, AP United States Government and Politics, and AP Environmental Science.

== Demographics ==
The demographic breakdown of the 2,634 students enrolled for the school year 2012–2013 was:

Gender

- Male – 50.5%
- Female – 49.5%

Ethnicity

- Native American/Alaskan – 0.3%
- Asian/Pacific Islander – 4.8%
- Black – 34.4%
- Hispanic – 14.4%
- White – 42.7%
- Multiracial – 3.4%

== Activities ==
=== NJROTC ===
North Cobb High School hosts a Naval JROTC unit. This is a joint unit made up of cadets from both North Cobb and Harrison high schools. Its official name is the North Cobb/Harrison NJROTC unit.

=== Concert Band ===
The North Cobb Band consists of three ensembles: Concert Band, Symphonic Band, and Wind Symphony. The North Cobb Wind Symphony performed at the Georgia Music Educators Association (GMEA) State Convention in 2006, 2010, and 2020. In 2022, they performed at the Music for All Southeastern Concert Band Festival.

=== Marching Band ===
The North Cobb High School Marching Band began in 1958. The band won a WSB-TV's Best High School Band Contest in 2009 and performed at Turner Field before an Atlanta Braves game in September 2010. In 2016, the band performed the halftime show in the Georgia Dome during the Atlanta Falcons vs. New Orleans Saints game.

=== Orchestra ===
The North Cobb High School Orchestra was established in 1994 and has since taught over 170 student musicians since. The orchestra consists of three ensembles: Freshman Orchestra, Concert Orchestra, and Chamber Orchestra. They have regularly performed at a number of conferences and festivals, both in-state and abroad. Notable venues include St. Andrew's Church in London, Symphony Hall in Boston, Orchestra Hall in Chicago, the Kennedy Center in Washington, D.C., and Carnegie Hall in New York City.

== Publications ==
North Cobb High School's The Chant started as a print publication in 1974 and changed to its current digital format in 2012, becoming the first Cobb County school to have a completely digital online newspaper.

== Notable alumni ==
- Christian Albright (2017) – professional football player
- Donatello Brown (2009) – professional football player
- Harry Ford (2021) – professional baseball player
- Travis Hawkins – National football league scout Baltimore Ravens
- Joshua Josephs (2022) – college football defensive end for the Tennessee Volunteers
- Ron Lester – actor
- Scott F. McAfee - judge
- Ayman Mohyeldin – journalist; among Time's 100 Most Influential People 2011
- Lee Moore (2013) – professional basketball player
- Larry Nelson – professional golfer, winner of multiple national and international tournaments, 3 time major champion, World Golf Hall of Fame
- Eric Norwood (2006) – Consensus All-American linebacker at the University of South Carolina, drafted in the NFL by the Carolina Panthers (2010 NFL draft)
- Sean O'Pry – supermodel
- Robert Lee Ross, Jr. – United States Army Ranger and professional wrestler
- Malachi Singleton (2023) – college football quarterback for the Purdue Boilermakers
- Darren Waller (2011) – professional football player for the Miami Dolphins
- Chandler Wooten (2017) – professional football player for the Carolina Panthers
