= Emanuel Davis =

American gridiron football player (born 1989)

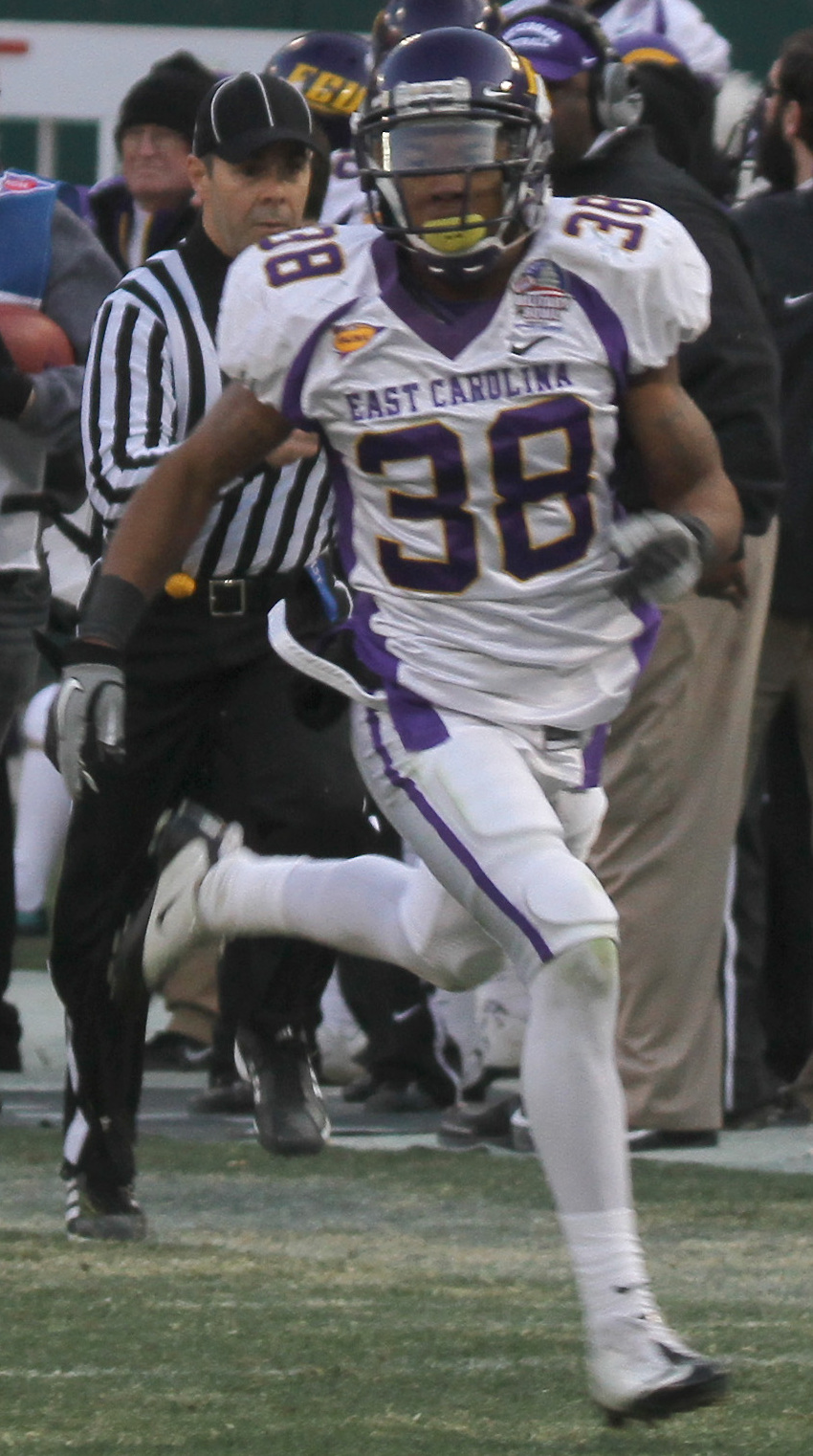
- Davis with East Carolina in 2010

No. 8, 22
- Position: Defensive back

Personal information
- Born: August 9, 1989 (age 37); Manteo, North Carolina, U.S.
- Listed height: 5 ft 11 in (1.80 m)
- Listed weight: 182 lb (83 kg)

Career information
- College: East Carolina

Career history
- 2012: Cleveland Browns*
- 2012: Sacramento Mountain Lions
- 2013–2017: Hamilton Tiger-Cats
- 2018: Calgary Stampeders
- * Offseason or practice squad member only

Awards and highlights
- Grey Cup champion (2018); CFL All-Star (2015); 2× CFL East All-Star (2015, 2016); First-team All-C-USA (2009); 2× Second-team All-C-USA (2010, 2011)
- Stats at CFL.ca

Emanuel Edward Davis (born August 9, 1989) is an American former professional football defensive back. Davis spent the majority of his pro career as a member of the Hamilton Tiger-Cats of the Canadian Football League (CFL). He was a member of the Cleveland Browns (NFL), Sacramento Mountain Lions (UFL), and Calgary Stampeders (CFL). Davis played college football at East Carolina.

== Professional career ==
Davis joined the Hamilton Tiger-Cats in time for the team's 2013 season. In total Davis played in 79 CFL games in his career, contributing with 246 tackles, 14 interceptions, and one quarterback sack. He was named a CFL All-Star in 2015 and CFL East All-Star in 2016. He won the 106th Grey Cup with the Stampeders to conclude his final season of professional football.
