= Ty Long =

American football player (born 1993)

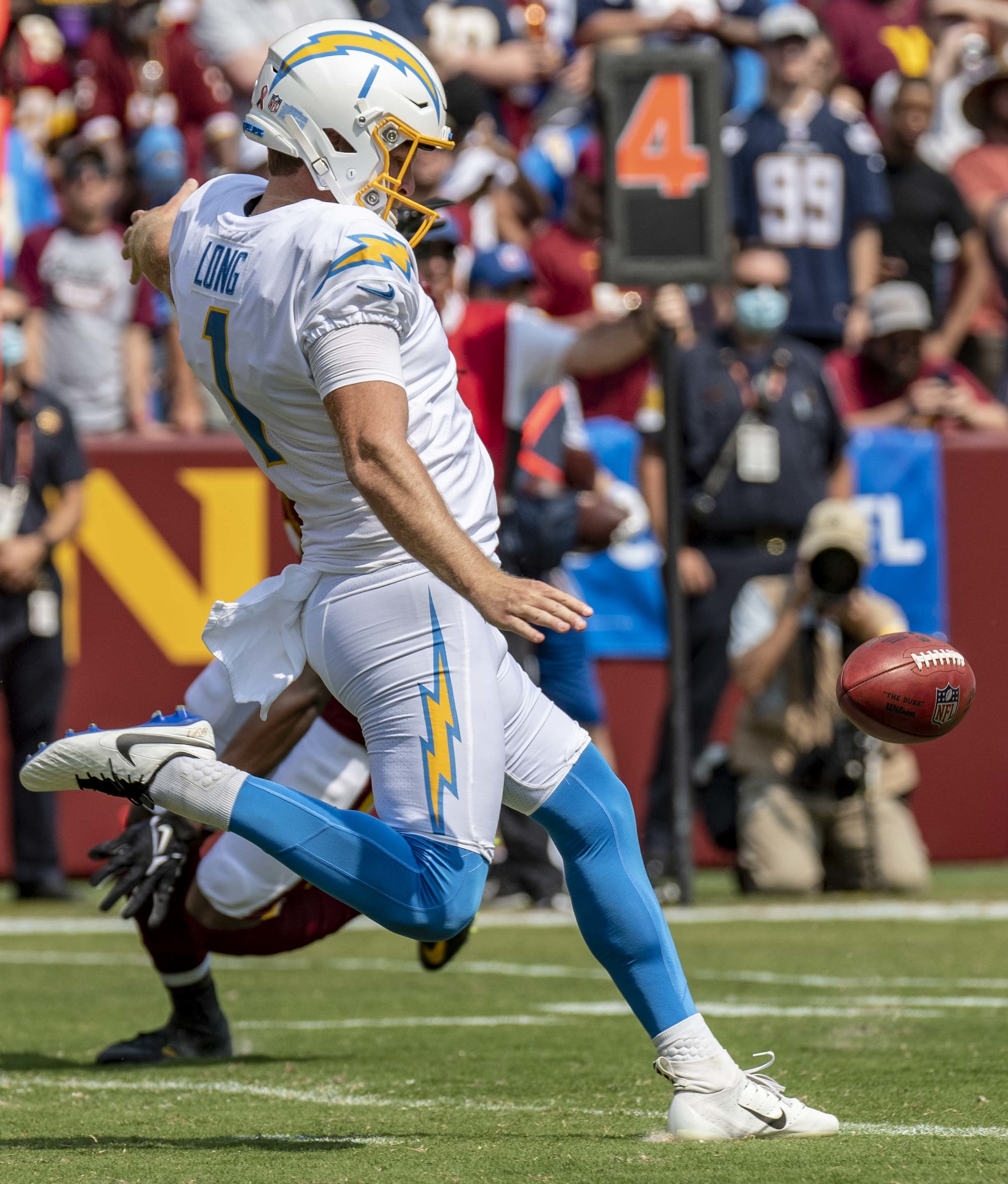
- Long with the Los Angeles Chargers in 2021

No. 1
- Positions: Punter, placekicker

Personal information
- Born: April 6, 1993 (age 33); Roswell, Georgia, U.S.
- Listed height: 6 ft 2 in (1.88 m)
- Listed weight: 205 lb (93 kg)

Career information
- High school: Roswell
- College: UAB
- NFL draft: 2015: undrafted

Career history
- Washington Redskins (2015)*; Pittsburgh Steelers (2016)*; BC Lions (2017–2018); Los Angeles Chargers (2019–2021); New York Jets (2022)*
- * Offseason or practice squad member only

Awards and highlights
- 2× CFL All-Star (2017, 2018)

Career NFL statistics
- Field goals: 7
- Field goal attempts: 9
- Longest field goal: 51
- Punts: 124
- Punt yardage: 7,016
- Punt average: 47.2
- Stats at Pro Football Reference

Career CFL statistics
- Field goals: 82
- Field goal attempts: 93
- Longest field goal: 52
- Punts: 236
- Punt average: 48.3
- Stats at CFL.ca

Tyler R. Long (born April 6, 1993) is an American former professional football player who was a punter and placekicker in the National Football League (NFL) and Canadian Football League (CFL). He played college football for the UAB Blazers and holds school records for career field goals (59) as well as the longest field goal (54 yards).

== Professional career ==
Pre-draft measurables
Height	Weight	Arm length	Hand span	Wingspan
6 ft 0 3/4 in (1.85 m)	206 lb (93 kg)	30 in (0.76 m)	8 3/4 in (0.22 m)	5 ft 11 1/2 in (1.82 m)
All values from Pro Day

=== Washington Redskins ===
On May 7, 2015, Long signed with the Washington Redskins to compete with placekicker Kai Forbath. He played in three preseason games for the team. On August 30, 2015, he was waived.

=== Pittsburgh Steelers ===
On January 20, 2016, Long signed a reserve/future contract with the Pittsburgh Steelers. On May 5, 2016, he was waived by the team.

=== BC Lions ===
Long was signed by the BC Lions of the Canadian Football League (CFL) on May 24, 2017. He became the starting punter and placekicker, following the release of veteran kicker Swayze Waters. Long converted 39 of 44 field goals (88.6%) in his first season with the Lions. He also averaged 47.9 yards on 116 punts. At the conclusion of the 2018 season Long was named the Lions' nominee for Most Outstanding Player and Most Outstanding Special Teams Player. He was also named a CFL All-Star for the second consecutive season. On January 4, 2019, he was released by the Lions in order to pursue an NFL opportunity (Long's contract would have expired February 12, 2019).

=== Los Angeles Chargers ===
On January 14, 2019, Long signed a reserve/future contract with the Los Angeles Chargers. He was named the Chargers starting punter to start the season. In Week 1, following an injury to kicker Michael Badgley, Long took over kicking duties along with punting. He converted his only field goal attempt and converted all three extra points, while punting twice for 98 yards inside the 20-yard-line. After his NFL debut performance against the Indianapolis Colts, Long was named the Week 1 AFC Special Teams Player of the Week. In Week 4, against the Miami Dolphins, Long converted three extra point attempts and three field goal attempts in the 30–10 victory. Long signed a one-year exclusive-rights free agent tender with the Chargers on March 17, 2021.

=== New York Jets ===
On September 14, 2022, Long was signed to the practice squad of the New York Jets. He was released on September 20.
