= Terrell Sinkfield =

American gridiron football player (born 1990)

Profile
- Positions: Cornerback, wide receiver, return specialist

Personal information
- Born: December 10, 1990 (age 35); Minneapolis, Minnesota, U.S.
- Listed height: 6 ft 1 in (1.85 m)
- Listed weight: 200 lb (91 kg)

Career information
- High school: Hopkins (Minnetonka, Minnesota)
- College: Northern Iowa
- NFL draft: 2013: undrafted

Career history
- Miami Dolphins (2013)*; Green Bay Packers (2013)*; Buffalo Bills (2013)*; New York Giants (2013)*; Toronto Argonauts (2014); Hamilton Tiger Cats (2014–2015); Minnesota Vikings (2016)*; BC Lions (2016); Minnesota Vikings (2017)*; New York Jets (2017–2018)*; Oakland Raiders (2018)*; Hamilton Tiger-Cats (2018); Orlando Apollos (2019); New York Giants (2019)*; Toronto Argonauts (2021)*
- * Offseason or practice squad member only

Career CFL statistics
- Receptions: 86
- Receiving yards: 1,240
- Receiving touchdowns: 7
- Return yards: 369
- Stats at CFL.ca
- Stats at Pro Football Reference

Terrell Sinkfield Jr. (born December 10, 1990) is a former gridiron football wide receiver. He was a member of the Toronto Argonauts of the Canadian Football League (CFL). He played college football at Northern Iowa. In his career Sinkfield has been a member of seven NFL teams, three CFL teams, and one AAF team.

== Professional career ==
Sinkfield was not invited to the NFL Combine, but garnered much attention with an impressive performance at Minnesota's Pro Day, after posting an unofficial time of 4.19 seconds in his second attempt in the 40-yard dash. Which was later found to be a 4.24 after video review.

Pre-draft measurables
Height	Weight	40-yard dash	10-yard split	20-yard split	20-yard shuttle	Three-cone drill	Vertical jump	Broad jump	Bench press
6 ft 0 in (1.83 m)	198 lb (90 kg)	4.19 s	1.52 s	2.38 s	4.18 s	6.94 s	42.5 in (1.08 m)	11 ft 5 in (3.48 m)	12 reps
All values from Minnesota's Pro Day

=== Miami Dolphins ===
On April 27, 2013, Sinkfield signed with the Miami Dolphins as an undrafted free agent following the 2013 NFL draft. On May 28, 2013, he was waived by the Dolphins.

=== Green Bay Packers ===
On June 11, 2013, Sinkfield was signed by the Green Bay Packers. On July 19, 2013, he was released by the Packers.

=== Buffalo Bills ===
On August 3, 2013, Sinkfield was signed by the Buffalo Bills. On August 18, 2013, he was released by the Bills.

=== New York Giants (first stint) ===
On August 21, 2013, Sinkfield was signed by the New York Giants. On August 25, 2013, he was cut by the Giants.

=== Toronto Argonauts (first stint) ===
On March 13, 2014, Sinkfield signed with the Toronto Argonauts of the Canadian Football League. He was released by the Argonauts on August 26, 2014, in a criticized transaction. Sinkfield was coming off his best game in which he caught four passes for 44 yards and a touchdown. He also had 109 return yards in the game.

=== Hamilton Tiger-Cats (first stint) ===
On September 4, 2014, Sinkfield signed with the Hamilton Tiger-Cats (CFL) . His first game was against the Saskatchewan Roughriders in which he scored a 58-yard punt return touchdown. Teamed with fellow speedster Brandon Banks, Sinkfield helped lead the TiCats to the Grey Cup game, with his speed and elusiveness. He caught 10 passes for 120 yards and had 613 return yards and a touchdown in just seven games in Hamilton, over 100 all purpose yards per game. In the Grey Cup, Sinkfield caught four of six targets for 28 yards, and finished the game with 23 return yards.

=== Minnesota Vikings (first stint) ===
On January 23, 2016, Sinkfield signed a futures contract with the Minnesota Vikings. On August 30, 2016, Sinkfield was cut by the Vikings.

=== BC Lions ===
On September 19, 2016, Terrell signed with the BC Lions. Sinkfield appeared in seven games for the Lions in 2016, catching 16 passes for 297 yards with three touchdowns.

=== Minnesota Vikings (second stint) ===
On March 30, 2017, Sinkfield re-signed with the Vikings. He was waived on September 2, 2017.

=== New York Jets ===
On September 4, 2017, Sinkfield was signed to the New York Jets' practice squad. He signed a reserve/future contract with the Jets on January 1, 2018. On August 31, 2018, Sinkfield was waived by the Jets.

=== Oakland Raiders ===
On September 3, 2018, Sinkfield was signed to the Oakland Raiders' practice squad. He was released on September 11, 2018.

=== Hamilton Tiger-Cats (second stint) ===
Sinkfield returned to the CFL on October 10, 2018, signing with the Hamilton Tiger-Cats. Sinkfield played in the final 2 regular season games, playing on offense in the first, where he caught 6 passes for 55 yards, and on special teams in the second, where he returned 6 kickoffs for 141 yards and 6 punts for 65 yards. Sinkfield was inactive for both playoff games that Hamilton played in; when head coach June Jones was asked about Sinkfield's benching in favor of newcomer Bralon Addison, Jones jokingly replied about Addison, "He's better."

=== Orlando Apollos ===
After becoming a free agent on February 12, 2019, he signed with the Orlando Apollos of the Alliance of American Football on February 19, 2019. He was waived on March 4, 2019.

=== New York Giants (second stint) ===
On August 14, 2019, Sinkfield was signed by the New York Giants. He was released as the Giants cut their roster to meet the 53 man deadline on August 31, 2019.

=== Toronto Argonauts (second stint) ===
On February 2, 2021, Sinkfield signed with the Toronto Argonauts. However, he was released near the end of training camp on July 28, 2021.
