= Louie Richardson =

Canadian football player (born 1985)

No. 77
- Position: Defensive end

Personal information
- Born: September 22, 1985 (age 41); Vancouver, British Columbia, Canada
- Listed height: 6 ft 4 in (1.93 m)
- Listed weight: 244 lb (111 kg)

Career information
- University: Manitoba
- CFL draft: 2011: undrafted

Career history
- 2012–2013: Hamilton Tiger-Cats
- 2014–2016: Winnipeg Blue Bombers
- 2016: Hamilton Tiger-Cats
- 2017: BC Lions
- Stats at CFL.ca

Louie Richardson (born September 22, 1985) is a Canadian former professional football defensive end who played in the Canadian Football League. He played CIS football for the Manitoba Bisons.

== Professional career ==
=== Hamilton Tiger-Cats (first stint) ===
Richardson was signed as an undrafted free agent by the Hamilton Tiger-Cats on May 24, 2012, and spent two seasons with the team, appearing in nine regular season games.

=== Winnipeg Blue Bombers ===
Richardson signed with the Winnipeg Blue Bombers on April 7, 2014. He played a total of 21 games over two years for Winnipeg before being released as part of final training camp cuts in 2016.

=== Hamilton Tiger-Cats (second stint) ===
Richardson re-signed with the Tiger-Cats on September 13, 2016, and played in six regular season games and one playoff game for the club. He became a free agent at the end of the season.

=== BC Lions ===
Richardson signed with the BC Lions on July 11, 2017. He was released on May 1, 2018.
