= Chandler Wooten =

American football player (born 1999)

No. 57 – Carolina Panthers
- Position: Linebacker
- Roster status: Active

Personal information
- Born: April 25, 1999 (age 27); Acworth, Georgia, U.S.
- Listed height: 6 ft 3 in (1.91 m)
- Listed weight: 230 lb (104 kg)

Career information
- High school: North Cobb (Kennesaw, Georgia)
- College: Auburn (2017–2021)
- NFL draft: 2022: undrafted

Career history
- Arizona Cardinals (2022)*; Carolina Panthers (2022–2024); San Francisco 49ers (2024)*; Carolina Panthers (2024–present)
- * Offseason or practice squad member only

Career NFL statistics as of 2024
- Total tackles: 39
- Forced fumbles: 1
- Fumble recoveries: 1
- Stats at Pro Football Reference

Chandler Wooten (born April 25, 1999) is an American professional football linebacker for the Carolina Panthers of the National Football League (NFL). He played college football for the Auburn Tigers and was signed as an undrafted free agent by the Arizona Cardinals in 2022.

== Early life ==
Chandler Wooten was born on April 25, 1999, to Kelvin and Sandra Wooten. Wooten attended North Cobb High School, where was nominated an all-region and state player for Georgia and was a part of the Under Armour All-America game.

== College career ==
Rated as the forty-fifth best college football player in Georgia, Wooten chose to attend Auburn University over the University of Tennessee. In Wooten's freshman year, he served in a backup role, recording sporadic tackles throughout the season. The following year, while not becoming the starter, Wooten was elevated in the depth chart and recorded more tackles than the year prior. In Wooten's junior year, he became the starting linebacker and solidified himself as a presence on the field. In what would have been his final season, Wooten sat out the year due to the COVID-19 pandemic. Wooten stayed for a fifth season at Auburn due to the NCAA allowing an extra year due to COVID-19 and performed his best, being voted team captain and winning the Shug Jordan Award.

== Professional career ==
Pre-draft measurables
Height	Weight	Arm length	Hand span	40-yard dash	10-yard split	20-yard split	20-yard shuttle	Three-cone drill	Vertical jump	Broad jump	Bench press
6 ft 2 5/8 in (1.90 m)	224 lb (102 kg)	32 3/4 in (0.83 m)	8 3/4 in (0.22 m)	4.82 s	1.71 s	2.78 s	4.45 s	7.28 s	30.5 in (0.77 m)	9 ft 3 in (2.82 m)	15 reps
All values from Pro Day

=== Arizona Cardinals ===
After going undrafted in the 2022 NFL draft, Wooten was signed as an undrafted free agent by the Arizona Cardinals. Wooten did not make the active roster but was signed to the practice squad of the Cardinals.

=== Carolina Panthers ===
On October 18, 2022, after the Carolina Panthers traded Christian McCaffrey to the San Francisco 49ers and thus freed up a roster spot, the Panthers signed Wooten to their active roster from the Cardinals practice squad.

On August 30, 2023, Wooten was waived by the Panthers and re-signed to the practice squad. He was signed to the active roster on September 8, 2023. He was placed on injured reserve on November 7.

On August 27, 2024, Wooten was waived by the Panthers and re-signed to the practice squad. He was promoted to the active roster on October 2. He was released and re-signed to the practice squad on October 23. He was released on November 7.

=== San Francisco 49ers ===
On December 17, 2024, Wooten was signed to the San Francisco 49ers practice squad.

=== Carolina Panthers (second stint) ===
On December 24, 2024, Wooten was signed by the Carolina Panthers off the 49ers practice squad.
