= Bralon Addison =

American football player (born 1993)

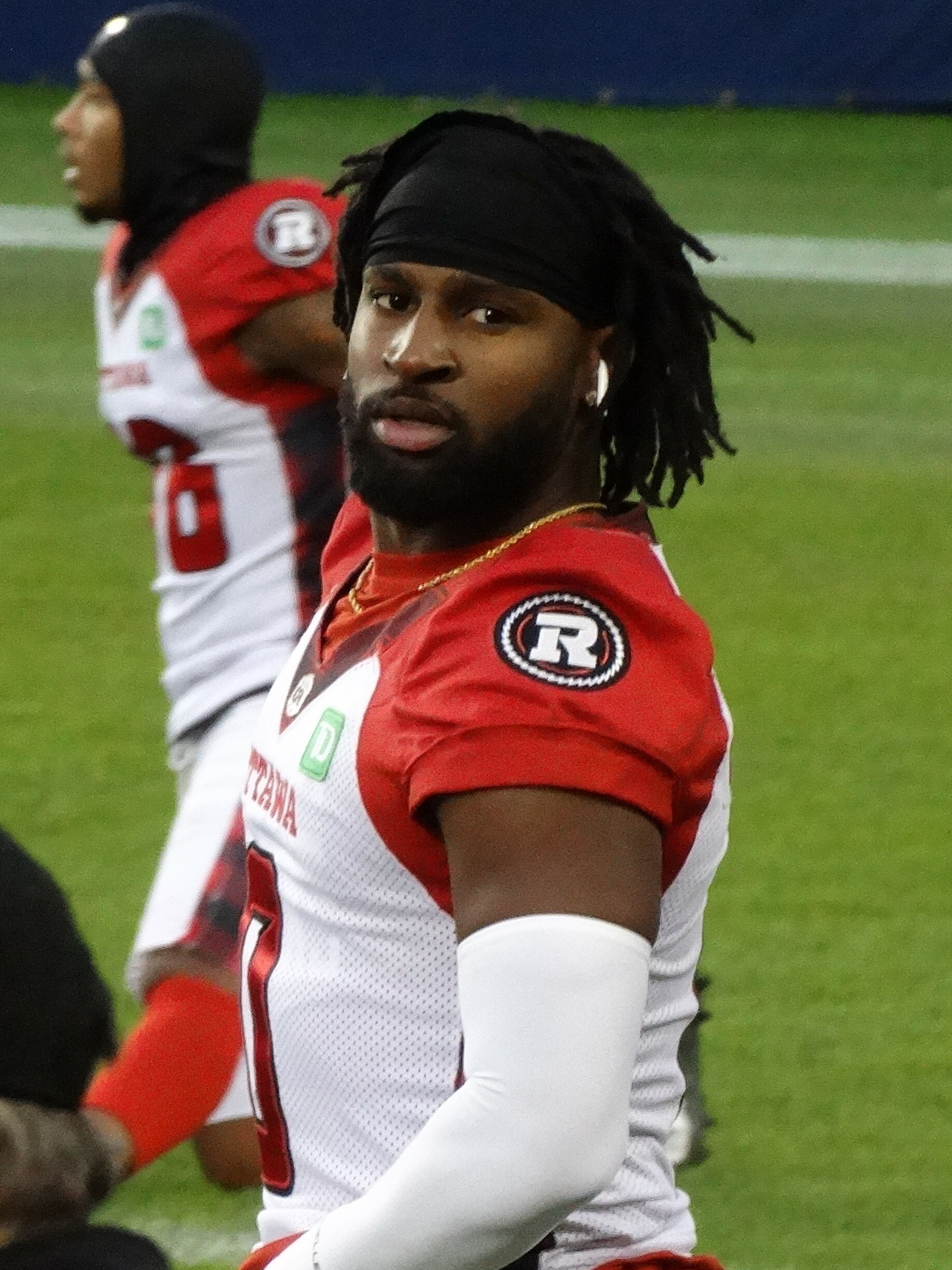
- Addison with the Ottawa Redblacks in 2023

Profile
- Position: Wide receiver

Personal information
- Born: October 12, 1993 (age 33); Missouri City, Texas, U.S.
- Listed height: 5 ft 9 in (1.75 m)
- Listed weight: 197 lb (89 kg)

Career information
- High school: Missouri City (TX) Hightower
- College: Oregon
- NFL draft: 2016: undrafted

Career history
- Denver Broncos (2016)*; Chicago Bears (2016); Toronto Argonauts (2018)*; Hamilton Tiger-Cats (2018–2019); Minnesota Vikings (2020)*; Hamilton Tiger-Cats (2021–2022); Ottawa Redblacks (2023–2025)
- * Offseason or practice squad member only

Awards and highlights
- CFL All-Star (2019); CFL East All-Star (2019); Second-team All-Pac-12 (2015)

Career NFL statistics
- Receptions: 1
- Receiving yards: 11
- Return yards: 21
- Stats at Pro Football Reference

Career CFL statistics as of 2025
- Receptions: 303
- Receiving yards: 3,543
- Receiving touchdowns: 16
- Stats at CFL.ca

Bralon Addison (born October 12, 1993) is an American professional football wide receiver. He most recently played for the Ottawa Redblacks of the Canadian Football League (CFL). He played college football at Oregon. Addison has also been a member of the Denver Broncos, Chicago Bears, Toronto Argonauts, Hamilton Tiger-Cats, and Minnesota Vikings.

== Early life ==
Addison attended Hightower High School in Missouri City, Texas. He played predominately quarterback his senior and junior years and wide receiver his sophomore year. He had thrown for 2,158 passing yards, 22 passing touchdowns, had 1,625 rushing yards and 20 rushing touchdowns as a senior. As a junior, he passed for 1,858 yards with 28 touchdowns and rushed for 1,068 yards and 15 touchdowns. Addison was rated by Rivals.com as a four-star recruit and committed to the University of Oregon to play college football.

== College career ==
As a true freshman at Oregon in 2012, Addison played in all 13 games and had 22 receptions for 243 yards. As a sophomore in 2013, Addison started 11 of 13 games, recording 61 receptions for 890 yards and seven touchdowns. He also returned two punt returns for touchdowns. Addison missed 2014 due to a torn ACL suffered during spring practice. He came close to playing in the 2015 College Football Playoff National Championship, but was not completely healed in time for the game. Addison returned from the injury to play in all 13 games in 2015. He finished with 63 receptions for 804 yards, 10 receiving touchdowns, two rushing touchdowns and one punt return touchdown. After the season, he entered the 2016 NFL draft.

== Professional career ==
=== Denver Broncos ===
After going undrafted in the 2016 NFL draft, Addison was signed by the Denver Broncos. On August 30, 2016, Addison was waived by the Broncos during roster cuts.

=== Chicago Bears ===
On December 5, 2016, Addison was signed to the Chicago Bears' practice squad. He was promoted to the active roster on December 20, 2016. On May 1, 2017, Addison was waived by the Bears.

=== Toronto Argonauts ===
On April 18, 2018, Addison signed with the Toronto Argonauts. Addison did not play a game for the Argos before he was released by the team on August 25, 2018.

=== Hamilton Tiger-Cats (first stint) ===
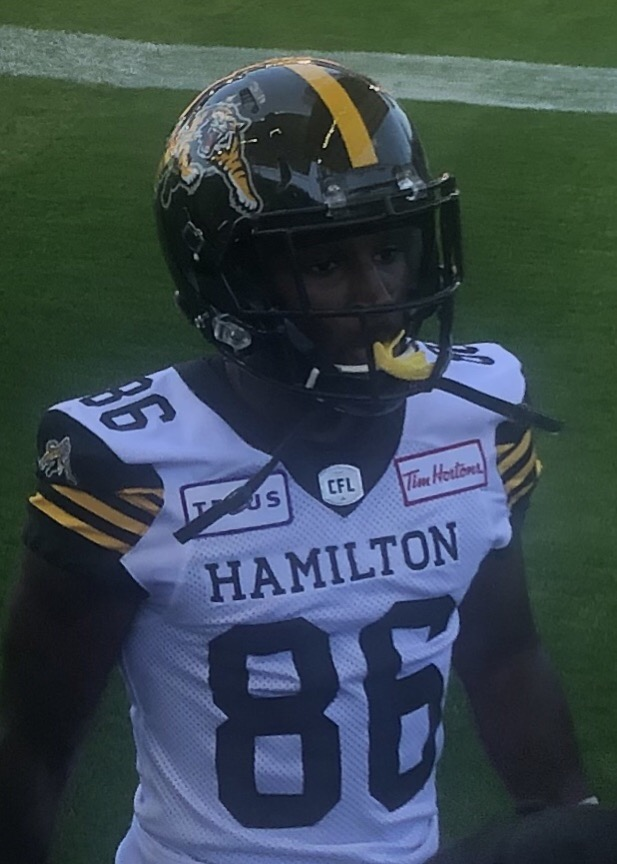
Addison with the Hamilton Tiger-Cats in 2019

On September 1, 2018, Addison signed with the Hamilton Tiger-Cats. Addison played 4 regular season games for Hamilton. In the final game of the year, Addison had 7 catches for 103 yards and a touchdown; Addison had only one catch for 10 yards the rest of the year. To explain Addison's playing time at the expense of CFL veteran Terrell Sinkfield, head coach June Jones jokingly replied about Addison, "He's better." While Sinkfield was inactive for both playoff games, Addison caught 5 passes for 124 yards in Hamilton's 48–8 victory over the BC Lions, and had 12 catches for 129 yards in the CFL East final, a loss to Ottawa. Addison continued his strong play into the 2019 season and was named a CFL Top Performer for the month of September. He finished the season with 95 receptions for 1,236 yards with seven touchdowns: He also carried the ball 36 times for 218 yards with one rushing touchdown and was named a CFL All-Star.

=== Minnesota Vikings ===
On January 21, 2020, Addison signed a reserve/future contract with the Minnesota Vikings of the NFL. He was waived on August 6, 2020.

=== Hamilton Tiger-Cats (second stint) ===
On December 25, 2020, Addison re-signed with the Tiger-Cats to a two-year contract. Addison missed the first half of the 2021 CFL season while recovering from a knee injury; he was added to the active roster on September 28, 2021. On October 24 Addison was placed on the six-game injured reserve list with a hamstring issue. Due to the multiple injuries Addison was limited to just three regular season games, catching 18 passes for 231 yards. He was re-added to the active roster on November 24, 2021, four days before the Ti-Cats Eastern semifinal match against the Montreal Alouettes. Addison did not catch a pass in either playoff game, and the Tiger-Cats were defeated in the 108th Grey Cup match. After playing in the first eight games of the 2022 season Addison was carted off the field with what was initially reported as a knee injury in the team's Week 9 loss against the Toronto Argonauts. A couple days later he reveled on Twitter that he had suffered a torn Achilles and would miss the remainder of the season. At the time of the injury Addison was leading the team in receptions, with 43, and was second to Steven Dunbar in receiving yards with 433 (Dunbar had 559 receiving yards). Addison was released by Hamilton on May 10, 2023.

=== Ottawa Redblacks ===
On May 13, 2023, it was announced that Addison had signed a one-year contract with the Ottawa Redblacks. In January 2024, he signed a one-year extension. On January 22, 2025, he signed a one-year extension with the Redblacks. In 2025, Addison recorded 72 receptions for 825 yards and three touchdowns along with 17 carries for 58 rushing yards. He became a free agent upon the expiry of his contract on February 10, 2026.

== Personal life ==
Addison is the son of Julias Addison and Sonya Swindell. He has one brother and one sister.
