= Swayze Waters =

American gridiron football player (born 1987)

No. 34
- Positions: Punter, placekicker

Personal information
- Born: May 18, 1987 (age 39); Jackson, Mississippi, U.S.
- Listed height: 6 ft 0 in (1.83 m)
- Listed weight: 180 lb (82 kg)

Career information
- High school: Jackson (MS) Prep
- College: UAB
- NFL draft: 2009: undrafted

Career history
- Detroit Lions (2009); Oakland Raiders (2010); Pittsburgh Steelers (2011); Edmonton Eskimos (2012); Toronto Argonauts (2012–2015); Carolina Panthers (2016)*; BC Lions (2017)*; Edmonton Eskimos (2017); Toronto Argonauts (2018)*
- * Offseason or practice squad member only

Awards and highlights
- Grey Cup champion (2012); John Agro Special Teams Award (2014); First-team All-C-USA (2007)
- Stats at Pro Football Reference
- Stats at CFL.ca

Swayze Waters (born May 18, 1987) is a former gridiron football placekicker and punter. He was most recently a member of the Toronto Argonauts of the Canadian Football League (CFL). He was signed by the Detroit Lions of the National Football League (NFL) as an undrafted free agent in 2009. He played college football at UAB. He has also been a member of the Oakland Raiders, Pittsburgh Steelers, Edmonton Eskimos, Carolina Panthers, and BC Lions.

== Early life ==
Waters attended Jackson Preparatory School in Jackson, Mississippi, where he played kicker, wide receiver and punter. He was his team's leading receiver for three years. He was named all-state selection his senior year. His senior year, he was voted team Most Valuable Player. That year, he had 35 catches, 813 yards and 10 touchdowns and 14 field goals. He also participated in baseball and track.

== College career ==
His college major was Business Management. In 2005, as a freshman, Waters was the kick off specialist. He was named to Conference USA Commissioner's Honor Roll. In 2006, as a sophomore, he was a kick off specialist and a "Long Field goal specialist". In 2007, as a Junior, he kicked and punted. He was named a finalist for the Lou Groza Award. He was also named first-team All-Conference USA by media and a second-team selection by conference's head coaches. He made 22-of-28 field goals during the season, including being 8-for-10 from 40-49 and 3-of-4 for 50-plus yards. In one game against Alcorn State, he kicked 5 field goals which set UAB single-game record. He had an average of 41.4 yards per punt.

== Professional career ==
=== Detroit Lions ===
Waters was signed by the Detroit Lions as an undrafted free agent following the 2009 NFL draft. He was cut from the team, only to be re-signed in August. He was waived/injured on August 26 when the team signed placekicker Billy Cundiff.

=== Oakland Raiders ===
Waters was signed by the Oakland Raiders on April 13, 2010. On September 4, 2010, Waters was released to free agent status by the Oakland Raiders.

=== Pittsburgh Steelers ===
Waters was signed by the Pittsburgh Steelers on February 10, 2011. He was released on September 2.

=== Edmonton Eskimos ===
Waters was signed by the Edmonton Eskimos (CFL) on June 24, 2012, and then released on July 10.

=== Toronto Argonauts (first stint) ===
On July 15, 2012, Waters was signed by the Toronto Argonauts (CFL) as an injury replacement for starting kicker Noel Prefontaine. The Argos would go on to win the 100th Grey Cup at the end of the 2012 season, with Waters' serving as the team's placekicker as Noel Prefontaine had returned to handle the punting duties. He won the John Agro Special Teams Award for being named the CFL's Most Outstanding Special Teams Player in 2014.

=== Carolina Panthers ===
On February 11, 2016, Waters was signed by the Carolina Panthers. He was waived on August 15, 2016.

=== BC Lions ===
On February 7, 2017, it was announced that Waters had signed with the BC Lions (CFL). He was recovering from an injury to start the 2017 CFL season, while rookie Ty Long assumed the kicking duties. After Long performed well in the first three games, Waters was released on July 12, 2017.

=== Edmonton Eskimos ===
Waters was signed by the Edmonton Eskimos on September 25, 2017. He played in five games for the Eskimos, making 11 of 15 field goal attempts and 12 of 14 one-point converts.

=== Toronto Argonauts (second stint) ===
Upon entering free agency, Waters signed with the Toronto Argonauts on February 14, 2018 to a one-year deal. However, Waters was released by the Argos on June 6, 2018, partway through the preseason.

== Personal life ==
Swayze Waters is the son of Susan and Joel Waters and is married to Kendal Carr Waters. Contrary to a popular rumor, Waters is not named after actor Patrick Swayze. His grandmother's maiden name was "Swayze" and that is for whom he is named.

He appeared in the third season of the TV series Undrafted on NFL Network, which aired in 2016. The series follows Waters as he leaves his punting job in the CFL in order to chase after his dream of being a punter in the NFL.
