= Almondo Sewell =

American gridiron football player (born 1987)

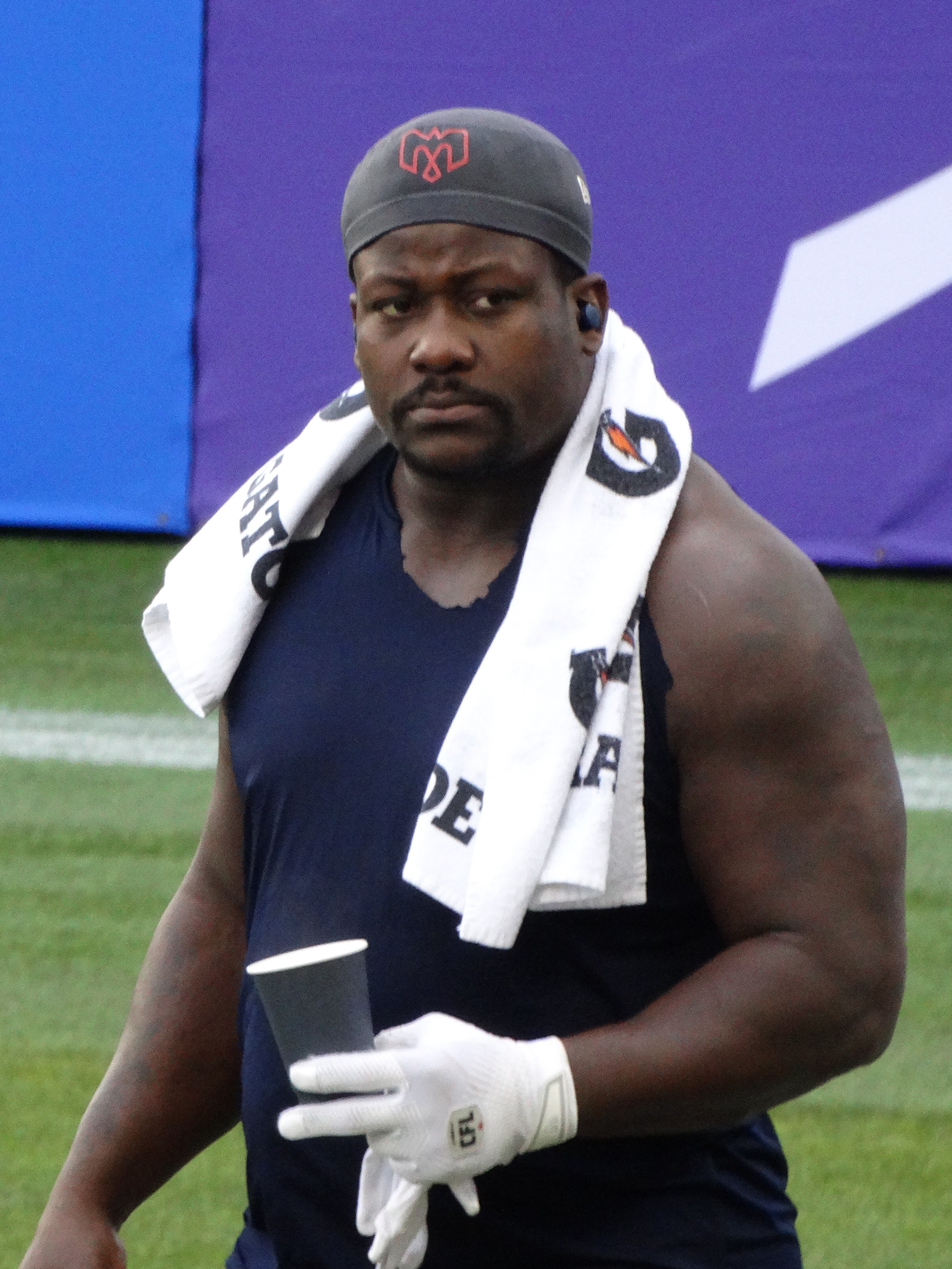
- Sewell with the Montreal Alouettes in 2023

No. 90
- Position: Defensive lineman

Personal information
- Born: January 16, 1987 (age 39); Buff Bay, Jamaica
- Listed height: 6 ft 4 in (1.93 m)
- Listed weight: 288 lb (131 kg)

Career information
- High school: Central (Trenton, New Jersey)
- College: Akron (2007–2010)
- NFL draft: 2011: undrafted

Career history

Playing
- Edmonton Eskimos (2011); Green Bay Blizzard (2012)*; Cleveland Gladiators (2012); Edmonton Eskimos (2012–2020); Montreal Alouettes (2021–2023)
- * Offseason or practice squad member only

Coaching
- Edmonton Elks (2024) Defensive line coach

Awards and highlights
- 2× Grey Cup champion (2015, 2023); 6× CFL All-Star (2013–2017, 2019); 7× CFL West All-Star (2012–2017, 2019); All-MAC second team (2007); All-MAC third team (2008, 2009)
- Stats at CFL.ca
- Stats at ArenaFan.com

Almondo Sewell (born January 16, 1987) is a Jamaican-American former professional football defensive tackle who played in the Canadian Football League (CFL) for the Edmonton Eskimos and Montreal Alouettes. He played college football at the University of Akron.

== Early life and college ==
Almondo Sewell was born on January 16, 1987, in Buff Bay, Jamaica. He attended Hargrave Military Academy before transferring to Trenton Central High School in Trenton, New Jersey.

Sewell was a four-year letterman for the Akron Zips of the University of Akron from 2007 to 2010. He was teammates all four years at Akron with fellow longtime CFL defensive lineman Shawn Lemon.

== Professional career ==
Pre-draft measurables
Height	Weight	40-yard dash	10-yard split	20-yard split	20-yard shuttle	Three-cone drill	Vertical jump	Broad jump	Bench press
6 ft 1 in (1.85 m)	280 lb (127 kg)	4.88 s	1.62 s	2.83 s	4.68 s	7.50 s	28 1/2 in (0.72 m)	8 ft 5 in (2.57 m)	44 reps
All values from Akron Pro Day

=== Edmonton Eskimos (first stint) ===
Sewell signed with the Edmonton Eskimos on May 27, 2011. He started the season on the reserve list and appeared in three games before being released on August 2, 2011.

=== Cleveland Gladiators ===
Almondo Sewell spent part of the 2012 season with the Cleveland Gladiators of the Arena Football League (AFL).

=== Edmonton Eskimos (second stint) ===
Sewell was signed by the Eskimos on June 4, 2012. He signed a contract extension on December 19, 2013. Sewell established himself as one of the league's top defensive linemen as he was named a CFL All-Star in five consecutive seasons (2013-2017) and a CFL West All-Star in six consecutive seasons (2012-2017). Sewell received multiple contract extensions while with the Eskimos, re-signing on December 19, 2013, December 22, 2015, and October 12, 2018. On February 2, 2021, at age 34, Sewell posted on Twitter that he would not be re-signing with Edmonton, and would become a free agent on February 9. Through his nine years with Edmonton, Sewell amassed 282 tackles and 60 sacks in 139 regular season games, and was named a CFL All-Star six times, and divisional All-Star seven times.

=== Montreal Alouettes ===
On February 9, 2021, it was announced that Sewell had signed with the Montreal Alouettes. He played in all 14 regular season games where he had 19 defensive tackles and five sacks.

In 2023, Sewell played in 16 regular season games where he had 14 defensive tackles and one sack. He later played in his second career Grey Cup, the 110th Grey Cup game, where he had two defensive tackles in the victory over the Winnipeg Blue Bombers. With one year remaining on his contract, Sewell was released on February 8, 2024.

== Coaching career ==
On July 16, 2024, Sewell was named the defensive line coach of the Edmonton Elks following the resignation of Nate O'Neal. Following a coaching staff change, he was not retained in 2025.

== Personal life ==
He has a pet rabbit named Dusko. In 2015, Sewell said he planned to join the Edmonton Police Service after his football career was over.
