= 2014 CFL season =

Canadian Football League season

- Duration: June 26 – November 8, 2014
- East champions: Hamilton Tiger-Cats
- West champions: Calgary Stampeders

102nd Grey Cup
- Date: November 30, 2014
- Venue: BC Place, Vancouver
- Champions: Calgary Stampeders

CFL seasons
- ← 2013 2015 →

Locations of the active CFL teams West East

The 2014 CFL season was the 61st season of modern-day Canadian football. It was the 57th Canadian Football League season. Vancouver hosted the 102nd Grey Cup on November 30. The league expanded to nine teams with the addition of the Ottawa Redblacks, giving the CFL nine teams for the first time since the 2005 season. As a result of the expansion, the schedule shifted to a 20-week regular season plus three weeks of playoffs (including the Grey Cup); the season started on June 26, 2014.

== CFL news in 2014 ==
=== Labour negotiations ===
The collective bargaining agreement between the CFL and the CFL Players' Association (CFLPA) expired on May 29, 2014. With a new and more lucrative television contract with TSN beginning this season, revenue distribution was a major sticking point in CBA negotiations.

Unlike other professional sports leagues in North America, the CFL salary cap is not tied to league revenues. The league had offered to raise the previous $4.4 million (CAD) salary cap to $5 million, with further increases of $50,000 for each subsequent year. The players' union originally countered with a proposal that would have increased the cap to $6.24 million in 2014 with the cap in subsequent years being calculated as a percentage of league revenues, but CFL Commissioner Mark Cohon had said the league would never agree to such a formula. The CFLPA then withdrew its demand for revenue sharing and put forth a proposal that would have increased the cap to $5.8 million with 3% annual increases and a $4.8 million salary floor that would increase with the cap, but this offer was also rejected by the league.

The CFLPA had indicated that it would not play the 2014 season under the terms of the expired agreement. After negotiations broke down on May 21, the CFLPA began preparations for a strike vote. Had the players gone on strike, it would have been only the second work stoppage in CFL history and possibly the first to have caused the cancellation of regular season games. It would also have been the first work stoppage in North American professional sports in almost 20 years to be initiated by players, since all such labour disputes since the 1994–95 Major League Baseball strike have been owners' lockouts. The first CFL strike, in 1974, occurred during training camp and was settled before the regular season began.

On June 7, the CFL and CFLPA announced that they had reached a tentative labour agreement, pending ratification by the players and owners. The agreement was ratified by the players on June 12.

=== Labour agreement ===
The new collective bargaining agreement will be in place until May 15, 2019, or the first day training camp in 2019, whichever comes later. However, if the nine member clubs' total aggregate revenues increase by more than $27 million in any year starting in 2016, both sides will renegotiate the salary cap. The salary cap for the 2014 season is set at $5 million per team (average of $108,695 per active roster spot), a 13.6% increase from the previous season. The cap will increase by $50,000 each year until 2018. The minimum salary per player increased by $5000 to $50,000 and will increase by $1000 each year until 2018.

The game-day roster increased from 42 players to 44 players, with 46 players still being named to the active roster, meaning the reserve roster decreased from four to two players. The practice roster for teams also increased from seven to ten players in the Summer and from 12 to 15 players in the Fall. The nine-game injury list was replaced with a six-game injury list, while retaining the option of removing two players early from the list. Clubs are also permitted to keep players on the list past the six games and not have their salaries count against the salary cap. The league has also removed the option-year clause on contracts for veteran players, making it possible for players to sign one-year contracts. Rookie players must still have option years on their contracts.

=== Ottawa expansion ===
This is the first season of play for the Ottawa Redblacks, as the CFL returned to the city of Ottawa for the first time since 2005 when the Ottawa Renegades suspended operations during the following off-season. The team was able to sign players starting on the day after the 101st Grey Cup on November 25, 2013, and an expansion draft for the club was held on December 16, 2013. The 2013 CFL Expansion Draft allowed the RedBlacks to select one import (Note: Under the terms of the collective bargaining agreement ratified in 2014, "non-import" players will now be termed "nationals" and "import" players will be termed "internationals".) and two non-import players from each of the eight existing member clubs. Additionally, after selecting four players in the 2013 CFL draft, the RedBlacks fully participated in the 2014 CFL draft, with the first picks in each of the draft's seven rounds. Their first regular season game was in Winnipeg on July 3, while their first regular season home game took place against the Toronto Argonauts on July 18.

The RedBlacks were placed in the East Division, after the Winnipeg Blue Bombers moved to the West Division. Similar to the previous two times the league changed to a nine-team league, in 1996 and 2002, Winnipeg immediately moved to the west. There was earlier speculation that Winnipeg would continue to be an East Division team, due to the CFL's board of governors' desire to have long-term stability. However, due to the desire of the Blue Bombers organization to return to the West Division, the switch was made for the 2014 season. Since the creation of the Canadian Football League in 1958, the Blue Bombers spent the first 29 seasons in the West Division, but 21 of the last 27 seasons in the East.

=== Season structure ===
The regular season schedule consists of 81 games played over 20 weeks, with 19 weeks featuring four games and week 8 featuring five games. Each team has two bye weeks except for the Toronto Argonauts, which will have three bye weeks since they are the only team scheduled to play two games in one week. In terms of team matchups, each team will play two divisional opponents three times and every other team twice. Each West Division team will play 10 divisional games, while each East Division team will play eight divisional games. The playoffs begin on November 16 and the 102nd Grey Cup will be played on November 30 at BC Place Stadium in Vancouver.

The schedule was announced on February 12, 2014, with the Winnipeg Blue Bombers hosting the league opener for the second consecutive season on June 26. The Grey Cup champions hosted a Grey Cup rematch in week 1 for the first time since 2011 and only the third time in the past nine seasons. Following the previous season's hiccup with the Labour Day Classic, the traditional rivalry game between the Argonauts and Hamilton Tiger-Cats resumed, along with Ottawa playing Montreal that same weekend (also historic Labour Day rivals). For the second consecutive season, the league is featuring all-division match ups in the final four weeks of the regular season. However, in stark contrast to the previous season's 13 home-and-home series, this season holds only two (both featuring Labour Day match ups). There are 25 double headers this year, with nine on Fridays, 11 on Saturdays, three on Sundays, and two (the traditional Labour Day and Thanksgiving contests) on Mondays.

=== Stadiums ===
The Ottawa Redblacks began play at the newly renovated (and renamed) TD Place Stadium, which finished construction on time and on budget. The old south side stands were condemned and demolished with construction completed in June 2014. The existing north side stands were refurbished and renovated to match the design of the completely rebuilt south side stands. The capacity of the stadium will be approximately 24,000 seats, which is a reduction of its prior capacity of approximately 29,000.

The Hamilton Tiger-Cats also began play at their new stadium, Tim Hortons Field, during the 2014 season. The stadium is being built on the same grounds as Ivor Wynne Stadium, which was demolished at the conclusion of 2012 CFL season. The new stadium will seat approximately 24,000 fans and will change to a north–south orientation as opposed to the east–west setup of Ivor Wynne Stadium. For the 2013 CFL season, the Tiger-Cats played at Alumni Stadium in Guelph, Ontario. To accommodate continued construction, the Tiger-Cats began the 2014 season with a four-week, three-game road trip; the stadium was slated to open in July but construction delays forced the Tiger-Cats to move the first three games of the 2014 season to McMaster University's Ron Joyce Stadium. Tim Hortons Field, still not completely finished, opened in time for the Labour Day Classic.

Due to stadium unavailability, three teams played their pre-season home games in stadiums that are not their regular season homes. The Redblacks' "home" pre-season game took place in Regina on June 14, 2014, with the Saskatchewan Roughriders as the visitors, as TD Place Stadium in Ottawa was not yet ready in time for that game. The Hamilton Tiger-Cats played at Ron Joyce Stadium against the Alouettes on June 14, 2014. Finally, the Argonauts played at the University of Toronto's Varsity Stadium against the Tiger-Cats on June 19, 2014.

=== College draft ===
Beginning with the 2014 CFL draft, non-import Canadian Interuniversity Sport (CIS) players will be eligible to be selected in the draft three years after completing their first season of eligibility. This eliminates any rookies who sat out or redshirted for their first playing year and would be eligible to return to university. Prior to this change, players were eligible to be selected after their fourth year of post-secondary education. Additionally, for non-import players playing in the National Collegiate Athletic Association (NCAA) or National Association of Intercollegiate Athletics (NAIA), they are now eligible to be selected after completing their senior year. This change eliminates the possibility of NCAA or NAIA students returning to college after being drafted.

=== Media ===
This will be the first season of the CFL's new international, multi-platform broadcast agreement with the ESPN Networks. In Canada, the league gave a no-bid extension to its existing exclusive contract with TSN and RDS, ESPN's partially owned Canadian subsidiary. This will mark the seventh season that TSN and RDS have been the exclusive broadcasters of the CFL. The agreement was expanded to the United States on June 27, one day before the regular season began. In the U.S., the contract will see the network's online platform, ESPN3, continue to present CFL games (as it has done since 2008), and will also see a minimum of 17 games (including the 102nd Grey Cup) air on one of ESPN's conventional networks (ESPN, ESPN2, or ESPNews) as well as through the WatchESPN platform. ESPN had aired 5 CFL games in 2013. The broadcast agreements for both the U.S. and Canadian rights run through the 2018 season. It is believed that TSN/ESPN will pay the CFL over $30 million per season over the course of the deal, which would be more than double the previous deal which was approximately $15 million. The impact of such an increase would allow for money-losing clubs to become profitable and allow all clubs to make more investments in stadiums and practice facilities.

The agreement also ends the CFL's relationship with the U.S. cable network NBCSN, who carried a limited selection of games (see CFL on NBC) during the 2012 and 2013 seasons.

=== Coaching changes ===
The Edmonton Eskimos relieved Kavis Reed of his coaching duties following the 2013 season. Reed had been the head coach of Edmonton for three seasons from 2011 through 2013, compiling a record of 22 and 32 (1–2 in the playoffs). Edmonton management replaced Reed with Chris Jones who had most recently been the Defensive Coordinator/Assistant Head Coach/Assistant General Manager of the Argonauts for the previous two seasons. Tom Higgins was brought in by Montreal Alouettes GM Jim Popp to take over from the intern head coach position which Popp had been filling since early in the 2013 season. Higgins had been the CFL's Head of Officiating from 2008 through 2013. This will be Higgins' third stint as a CFL head coach, having previously served under the Calgary Stampeders (2005–06) and Eskimos (2001–04). Mike O'Shea became the 30th coach of the Blue Bombers after he replaced Tim Burke. O'Shea had been the Special Teams Coordinator of the Toronto Argonauts from the 2010 season through 2013. The Ottawa RedBlacks began their inaugural season under the tutelage of Rick Campbell. Campbell had been the Defensive Coordinator of the Stampeders for the previous two seasons.

=== Trade deadline ===
The deadline for teams to complete trades is Wednesday, October 15 at 3:59pm EDT.

=== Records ===
==== Team records ====
In Week 15, the Saskatchewan Roughriders scored three 2-point converts in a single game, establishing a new CFL record for most successful 2-point converts in a single contest.

== Uniforms ==
- The expansion Ottawa Redblacks unveiled their home and away uniforms on May 6, 2014. Ottawa was also the only team to wear their home uniforms as a visiting opponent (once against the Alouettes and again against the Lions).
- The Saskatchewan Roughriders wore new retro-themed alternate uniforms on August 31 based on the uniforms that were worn from 1980 to 1984.
- The Calgary Stampeders re-introduced red pants to be worn with their white jerseys, which had not been done since the 2007 season.

=== Signature series ===
West Division Signature Uniforms

East Division Signature Uniforms

On August 6, 2014, the league announced that each team would be wearing brand new alternate uniforms, complete with new jerseys, pants, helmets, and socks. The BC Lions were the first to debut the new uniforms during the previous season, with the other eight clubs unveiling theirs this year. One of the most noticeable features were logos centred on the front of four of the uniforms (Edmonton, Winnipeg, Toronto, and Ottawa), which had not been seen since the 1995 CFL season. Each team wore the uniforms at two times this season with the exception of Winnipeg, who wore theirs once, and Ottawa and Calgary, who wore theirs three times. Each team is scheduled to wear these uniforms at least once for the 2015 CFL season.

== Regular season ==
=== Structure ===
Teams play eighteen regular season games, playing two divisional opponents three times and all of the other teams twice. Teams are awarded two points for a win and one point for a tie. The top three teams in each division qualify for the playoffs, with the first place team gaining a bye to the divisional finals. A fourth place team in one division may qualify ahead of the third place team in the other division (the "Crossover"), if they earn more points in the season. If a third-place team finishes in a tie with the fourth place team in the other division, the third place team automatically gets the playoff spot and there is no crossover.

If two or more teams in the same division are equal in points, the following tiebreakers apply:

1. Most wins in all games
2. Head to head winning percentage (matches won divided by all matches played)
3. Head to head points difference
4. Head to head points ratio
5. Tiebreakers 3–5 applied sequentially to all divisional games
6. Tiebreakers 4 and 5 applied sequentially to all league games
7. Coin toss

Notes:

- 1. If two clubs remain tied after other club(s) are eliminated during any step, tie breakers reverts to step 2.

=== Standings ===
Note: GP = Games played, W = Wins, L = Losses, T = Ties, PF = Points for, PA = Points against, Pts = Points

Teams in bold are in playoff positions.

West Division
Team	GP	W	L	T	PF	PA	Pts	
**Calgary Stampeders**	18	15	3	0	511	347	30	Details
**Edmonton Eskimos**	18	12	6	0	492	340	24	Details
**Saskatchewan Roughriders**	18	10	8	0	399	441	20	Details
**BC Lions**	18	9	9	0	380	365	18	Details
Winnipeg Blue Bombers	18	7	11	0	397	481	14	Details

East Division
Team	GP	W	L	T	PF	PA	Pts	
**Hamilton Tiger-Cats**	18	9	9	0	417	395	18	Details
**Montreal Alouettes**	18	9	9	0	360	394	18	Details
Toronto Argonauts	18	8	10	0	450	456	16	Details
Ottawa Redblacks	18	2	16	0	278	465	4	Details

- Hamilton finished 1st in the East Division because they won their 2 game total point regular season series against Montreal (60–53).

== CFL playoffs ==
On March 8, 2013, it was announced at a news conference that BC Place in Vancouver, BC, will play host to the 102nd Grey Cup. It was the 16th Grey Cup to be held in Vancouver (and 8th at BC Place). The Calgary Stampeders defeated the Hamilton Tiger-Cats 20–16 to claim their seventh Grey Cup championship. Calgary's quarterback Bo Levi Mitchell was named the Grey Cup's Most Valuable Player, while Hamilton's slot back, Andy Fantuz was named Grey Cup's Most Outstanding Canadian.

=== Playoff bracket ===
November 16: Division Semi-Finals
East
W4	BC Lions	17
E2	Montreal Alouettes	50
West
W3	Saskatchewan Roughriders	10
W2	Edmonton Eskimos	18

November 23: Division Finals
E2	Montreal Alouettes	24
E1	Hamilton Tiger-Cats	40
W2	Edmonton Eskimos	18
W1	Calgary Stampeders	43

November 30: 102nd Grey Cup; BC Place – Vancouver
E1	Hamilton Tiger-Cats	16
W1	Calgary Stampeders	20

*-Team won in Overtime.

== Award winners ==
=== CFL Player of the Week ===
Week	Offensive Player of the Week	Defensive Player of the Week	Special Teams Player of the Week	Outstanding Canadian
One	Drew Willy	Ricky Foley	Chad Owens	Ricky Foley
Two	Ricky Ray	John Bowman	Demond Washington	Andre Durie
Three	Andrew Harris	Almondo Sewell	Jock Sanders	Andrew Harris
Four	Emmanuel Arceneaux	Odell Willis	Brett Maher	Andrew Harris
Five	Dan LeFevour	John Chick	Lirim Hajrullahu	Samuel Hurl
Six	Drew Willy	Ronnie Yell	Quincy McDuffie	Andrew Harris
Seven	Kevin Glenn	John Chick	Brandon Banks	Jerome Messam
Eight	Stefan Logan	John Chick	Tim Brown	Rob Bagg
Nine	Joe West	Dexter McCoil	Tim Brown	Eddie Steele
Ten	Jon Cornish	Ricky Foley	Troy Stoudermire	Jon Cornish
Eleven	Anthony Allen	Bear Woods	James Rodgers	Jon Cornish
Twelve	Jon Cornish	Taylor Reed	Terrell Sinkfield	Jon Cornish
Thirteen	Zach Collaros	Eric Norwood	Weston Dressler	Shea Emry
Fourteen	John White	Bear Woods	Jock Sanders	Jon Cornish
Fifteen	Jonathan Williams	Shawn Lemon	Swayze Waters	Justin Capicciotti
Sixteen	Ricky Ray	Dexter McCoil	Terrell Sinkfield	Andy Fantuz
Seventeen	Jon Cornish	Dexter McCoil	Kendial Lawrence	Jon Cornish
Eighteen	Steve Slaton	Khreem Smith	Glenn Love	James Yurichuk
Nineteen	Duron Carter	J. C. Sherritt	Brandon Banks	Justin Capicciotti
Twenty	Marquay McDaniel	Keon Raymond	Swayze Waters	Quinn Smith
Twenty-one	John White	Jerald Brown	Kendial Lawrence	Gregory Alexandre
Twenty-two	Bo Levi Mitchell	Juwan Simpson	Brandon Banks	Jon Cornish

=== CFL Player of the Month ===
Month	Offensive Player of the Month	Defensive Player of the Month	Special Teams Player of the Month	Outstanding Canadian
July	Mike Reilly	John Chick	Swayze Waters	Andrew Harris
August	Adarius Bowman	John Chick	Tim Brown	Rob Bagg
September	Jon Cornish	Bear Woods	Weston Dressler	Jon Cornish
October	Ernest Jackson	Bear Woods	Kendial Lawrence	Antoine Pruneau

== 2014 CFL All-Stars ==
=== Offence ===
- QB – Ricky Ray, Toronto Argonauts
- RB – Jon Cornish, Calgary Stampeders
- RB – John White, Edmonton Eskimos
- R – Duron Carter, Montreal Alouettes
- R – Clarence Denmark, Winnipeg Blue Bombers
- R – Chad Owens, Toronto Argonauts
- R – Adarius Bowman, Edmonton Eskimos
- OT – Jovan Olafioye, BC Lions
- OT – Stanley Bryant, Calgary Stampeders
- OG – Brendon LaBatte, Saskatchewan Roughriders
- OG – Simeon Rottier, Edmonton Eskimos
- OC – Brett Jones, Calgary Stampeders

=== Defence ===
- DT – Ted Laurent, Hamilton Tiger-Cats
- DT – Almondo Sewell, Edmonton Eskimos
- DE – John Chick, Saskatchewan Roughriders
- DE – Odell Willis, Edmonton Eskimos
- LB – Solomon Elimimian, BC Lions
- LB – Bear Woods, Montreal Alouettes
- LB – Dexter McCoil, Edmonton Eskimos
- CB – Delvin Breaux, Hamilton Tiger-Cats
- CB – Pat Watkins, Edmonton Eskimos
- DB – Brandon Smith, Calgary Stampeders
- DB – Jamar Wall, Calgary Stampeders
- S – Tyron Brackenridge, Saskatchewan Roughriders

=== Special teams ===
- K – Swayze Waters, Toronto Argonauts
- P – Swayze Waters, Toronto Argonauts
- ST – Brandon Banks, Hamilton Tiger-Cats

== 2014 CFL Western All-Stars ==
=== Offence ===
- QB – Mike Reilly, Edmonton Eskimos
- RB – Jon Cornish, Calgary Stampeders
- RB – John White, Edmonton Eskimos
- R – Emmanuel Arceneaux, BC Lions
- R – Rob Bagg, Saskatchewan Roughriders
- R – Adarius Bowman, Edmonton Eskimos
- R – Clarence Denmark, Winnipeg Blue Bombers
- OT – Jovan Olafioye, BC Lions
- OT – Stanley Bryant, Calgary Stampeders
- OG – Brendon LaBatte, Saskatchewan Roughriders
- OG – Simeon Rottier, Edmonton Eskimos
- OC – Brett Jones, Calgary Stampeders

=== Defence ===
- DT – Tearrius George, Saskatchewan Roughriders
- DT – Almondo Sewell, Edmonton Eskimos
- DE – John Chick, Saskatchewan Roughriders
- DE – Odell Willis, Edmonton Eskimos
- LB – Adam Bighill, BC Lions
- LB – Solomon Elimimian, BC Lions
- LB – Dexter McCoil, Edmonton Eskimos
- CB – Fred Bennett, Calgary Stampeders
- CB – Pat Watkins, Edmonton Eskimos
- DB – Brandon Smith, Calgary Stampeders
- DB – Jamar Wall, Calgary Stampeders
- S – Tyron Brackenridge, Saskatchewan Roughriders

=== Special teams ===
- K – Paul McCallum, BC Lions
- P – Rob Maver, Calgary Stampeders
- ST – Deon Lacey, Edmonton Eskimos

== 2014 CFL Eastern All-Stars ==
=== Offence ===
- QB – Ricky Ray, Toronto Argonauts
- RB – Brandon Whitaker, Montreal Alouettes
- RB – Nic Grigsby, Hamilton Tiger-Cats
- R – Duron Carter, Montreal Alouettes
- R – Chad Owens, Toronto Argonauts
- R – Luke Tasker, Hamilton Tiger-Cats
- R – S. J. Green, Montreal Alouettes
- OT – Chris Van Zeyl, Toronto Argonauts
- OT – Josh Bourke, Montreal Alouettes
- OG – Brian Simmons, Hamilton Tiger-Cats
- OG – Tyler Holmes, Toronto Argonauts
- OC – Luc Brodeur-Jourdain, Montreal Alouettes

=== Defence ===
- DT – Ted Laurent, Hamilton Tiger-Cats
- DT – Alan-Michael Cash, Montreal Alouettes
- DE – Eric Norwood, Hamilton Tiger-Cats
- DE – John Bowman, Montreal Alouettes
- LB – Bear Woods, Montreal Alouettes
- LB – Simoni Lawrence, Hamilton Tiger-Cats
- LB – Chip Cox, Montreal Alouettes
- CB – Geoff Tisdale, Montreal Alouettes
- CB – Delvin Breaux, Hamilton Tiger-Cats
- DB – Jerald Brown, Montreal Alouettes
- DB – Rico Murray, Hamilton Tiger-Cats
- S – Craig Butler, Hamilton Tiger-Cats

=== Special teams ===
- K – Swayze Waters, Toronto Argonauts
- P – Swayze Waters, Toronto Argonauts
- ST – Brandon Banks, Hamilton Tiger-Cats

== 2014 CFL awards ==
- CFL's Most Outstanding Player Award – Solomon Elimimian (LB), BC Lions
- CFL's Most Outstanding Canadian Award – Jon Cornish (RB), Calgary Stampeders
- CFL's Most Outstanding Defensive Player Award – Solomon Elimimian (LB), BC Lions
- CFL's Most Outstanding Offensive Lineman Award – Brett Jones (OL), Calgary Stampeders
- CFL's Most Outstanding Rookie Award – Dexter McCoil (LB), Edmonton Eskimos
- John Agro Special Teams Award – Swayze Waters (K/P), Toronto Argonauts
- Tom Pate Memorial Award – Randy Chevrier (LS), Calgary Stampeders
- Jake Gaudaur Veterans' Trophy – James Yurichuk (LB), Toronto Argonauts
- Annis Stukus Trophy – John Hufnagel, Calgary Stampeders
- Commissioner's Award – Ottawa Redblacks ownership group
- Hugh Campbell Distinguished Leadership Award – Jim Hopson, Saskatchewan Roughriders
