= Brandon Smith (defensive back, born 1984) =

American gridiron football player (born 1984)

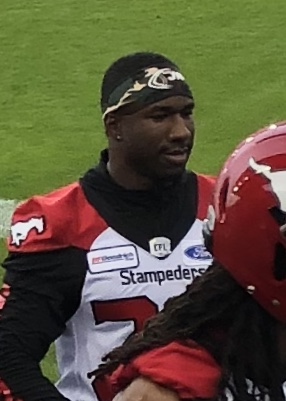
- Smith with the Calgary Stampeders in 2019

No. 28
- Position: Defensive back

Personal information
- Born: August 21, 1984 (age 42); Oakland, California, U.S.
- Listed height: 5 ft 10 in (1.78 m)
- Listed weight: 185 lb (84 kg)

Career information
- High school: McClymonds (Oakland, California)
- College: Sacramento State

Career history
- 2007: San Jose SaberCats
- 2008–2019: Calgary Stampeders

Awards and highlights
- 3× Grey Cup champion (2008, 2014, 2018); CFL All-Star (2014); CFL West All-Star (2014)
- Stats at CFL.ca

Brandon Smith (born August 21, 1984) is an American former professional football defensive back who played 12 seasons with the Calgary Stampeders of the Canadian Football League (CFL). He was signed by the San Jose SaberCats of the Arena Football League (AFL) as an undrafted free agent in 2007. He played college football at Sacramento State.
