= Nate O'Neal =

American gridiron football coach (born 1978)

Profile
- Position: Defensive line coach

Personal information
- Born: May 25, 1978 (age 48); Murphy, North Carolina, U.S.
- Listed height: 6 ft 0 in (1.83 m)

Career information
- High school: Murphy HS (NC)
- College: Western Carolina

Career history
- Edmonton Elks (2024) Defensive line coach

Nathan O'Neal (born May 25, 1978) is an American gridiron football coach. He was most recently the defensive line coach for the Edmonton Elks of the Canadian Football League (CFL). He was the defensive line coach for the America team at the 2024 Reese's Senior Bowl. He was an advisor for both teams at the East–West Shrine Bowl in 2023. He was the defensive line coach for Under Armour All-America Football from 2013 to 2023.

== Coaching career ==
=== Under Armour All-America Football ===
O'Neal began his coaching career with Under Armour All-America Football as the defensive line coach in 2013. He continued is tenure with Under Armour until 2023, being his final season with them.

=== East-West Shrine Bowl ===
Leading up to the East–West Shrine Bowl on February 2, 2023, O'Neal was hired to be an advisor for both teams.

=== Reese's Senior Bowl ===
On February 3, 2024, O'Neal coached in the Reese's Senior Bowl, after being hired as the defensive line coach for the America team.

=== Edmonton Elks ===
On March 18, 2024, the Edmonton Elks announced they had hired Nathan O'Neal as the defensive line coach. On July 16, 2024, it was announced that O'Neal had resigned from his position.

== Personal life ==
O'Neal has three sons Cooper, Grady, and Ryver with his wife.
