= Eric Norwood =

American gridiron football player (born 1988)

No. 92, 38, 40, 91
- Position: Defensive end

Personal information
- Born: May 24, 1988 (age 38); Oakland, California, U.S.
- Listed height: 6 ft 0 in (1.83 m)
- Listed weight: 246 lb (112 kg)

Career information
- High school: North Cobb (Kennesaw, Georgia)
- College: South Carolina
- NFL draft: 2010: 4th round, 124th overall pick

Career history
- Carolina Panthers (2010–2011); Virginia Destroyers (2012); San Jose SaberCats (2013); Pittsburgh Power (2013)*; Hamilton Tiger-Cats (2013–2015); Saskatchewan Roughriders (2016)
- * Offseason or practice squad member only

Awards and highlights
- First-team All-American (2009); 3× First-team All-SEC (2007, 2008, 2009); First-team Freshman All-American (2006)

Career NFL statistics
- Total tackles: 24
- Sacks: 1
- Forced fumbles: 1
- Stats at Pro Football Reference

Career AFL statistics
- Total tackles: 2
- Stats at ArenaFan.com

Eric Norwood (born May 24, 1988) is an American former professional football player who was a defensive end in the National Football League (NFL) and Canadian Football League (CFL). He played college football for the South Carolina Gamecocks, setting school career records in tackles for loss (54.5) and quarterback sacks (29). With numerous conference and national honors, Norwood is one of the most decorated defensive players in SEC history and has drawn comparisons to James Harrison. Norwood was considered a top linebacker prospect for the 2010 NFL draft; he was selected in the fourth round, 124 overall by the Carolina Panthers. He also played in the CFL for the Hamilton Tiger-Cats and Saskatchewan Roughriders.

== Early life ==
He played high school football at North Cobb High School in Acworth/Kennesaw, Georgia.

Considered a three-star recruit by Rivals.com, Norwood was listed as the No. 34 strongside defensive end prospect nationwide in 2006.

== College career ==
Norwood arrived at South Carolina in 2006 and immediately made an impact at the Defensive End position. In 13 games as a Freshman, he recorded 30 total tackles (9.0 for loss), 7.0 sacks, and 5.0 quarterback hurries. For his efforts, Norwood was named First-team Freshman All-American and All-SEC by The Sporting News. His 7.0 sacks tied for the team-lead, while his 5.0 hurries were tops for the team.

In 2007, Norwood asserted himself as one of the most effective Defensive Ends in college football. In 12 games, he recorded 69 total tackles (19.5 for loss), 6.0 sacks, 9.0 quarterback hurries, and 3 fumble recoveries. He was named First-team All-SEC by the league's coaches and Second-team All-SEC by the Associated Press. In a Thursday night game against a top 10 Kentucky squad, led by Heisman candidate Andre Woodson, Norwood turned in one of the most dominant single-game performances in NCAA history. He returned two fumbles for touchdowns, posted 5 total tackles (all solo and 1.0 for loss), and had two pass deflections. The two touchdowns on fumble returns tied an NCAA record.

After two stellar years at defensive end, Norwood moved to Linebacker for his Junior season in 2008. The position change did not affect his performance, as he posted 75 tackles (14.5 for loss), 9.0 sacks, 9 quarterback hurries, 2 fumble recoveries, and a forced fumble. Norwood was named First-team All-SEC by both the league's coaches and Associated Press. After South Carolina's loss in the 2009 Outback Bowl, Norwood announced that he planned to enter the 2009 NFL draft, but later changed his mind.

Norwood's decision to return for his Senior season was a beneficial one for the Gamecocks, as he helped lead the team to a 7-6 record and a PapaJohns.com Bowl appearance. In addition, Norwood broke South Carolina's all-time sack record by dropping Jevan Snead for a 5-yard loss during the Gamecocks 16-10 victory over Ole Miss. The record was previously held by defensive tackle Andrew Provence who had 26 career sacks. For the 2009 season, Norwood posted 81 tackles (11.5 for loss), 7.0 sacks, 11 quarterback hurries, 3 blocked kicks, a forced fumble, and a fumble recovery. In October 2009, Norwood was selected to The Sporting News midseason All-American team. Following the conclusion of the 2009 regular season, Norwood was named a First-team All-American by the Associated Press and the Walter Camp Football Foundation.

== Professional career ==
=== Pre-draft ===
Pre-draft measurables
Height	Weight	40-yard dash	10-yard split	20-yard split	20-yard shuttle	Three-cone drill	Vertical jump	Broad jump	Bench press	Wonderlic
6 ft 0 7/8 in (1.85 m)	242 lb (110 kg)	4.71 s	1.58 s	2.69 s	4.23 s	7.08 s	36 1/2 in (0.93 m)	9 ft 7 in (2.92 m)	21 reps	x
All values from 2010 NFL Combine

=== Carolina Panthers ===
After being selected by the Carolina Panthers in the 2010 NFL draft, Norwood rarely saw the field. He was released by the Panthers during the 2012 preseason.

=== Virginia Destroyers ===
Norwood played for the Virginia Destroyers of the United Football League in 2012, until the collapse of the league.

=== San Jose SaberCats ===
Norwood was assigned to the San Jose SaberCats of the Arena Football League in 2013.

=== Pittsburgh Power ===
On June 10, 2013, Norwood was traded by the SaberCats, along with Michael Diaz, to the Pittsburgh Power in exchange for future considerations.

=== Hamilton Tiger-Cats ===
Norwood played for the Hamilton Tiger-Cats of the CFL in the 2013 season, starting in the Grey Cup championship game. In 3 seasons in with the Ti-Cats Norwood amassed 114 tackles in 42 games. He was named an East Division All-Star following the 2014 season. Norwood tore his ACL while playing in the 2015 East Division Final, and while he was recovering he was released by the Tiger Cats on May 3, 2016.

=== Saskatchewan Roughriders ===
On May 8, 2016, reports said that Norwood was expected to sign with the Saskatchewan Roughriders (CFL), and he officially signed with the club the following day. His recovery took longer than anticipated and he only played in two games for the Riders in 2016. Following the season, at age 28, Norwood announced he was retiring from professional football.
