= Alumni Stadium (Guelph) =

Stadium in Guelph, Ontario

Coordinates: 43.5351°N 80.2267°W

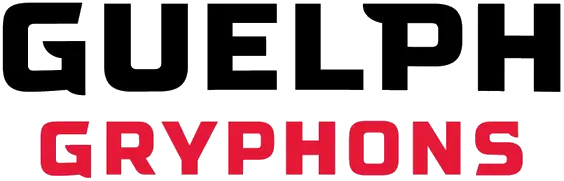

- Interactive map of Alumni Stadium
- Location: 26 Lang Way, Guelph, Ontario, Canada
- Owner: University of Guelph
- Capacity: U Sports football: 8,500; CFL football: 13,362
- Surface: FieldTurf Revolution (2012–present); Grass (1970–2012)

Construction
- Opened: 1970
- Cost: Unknown

Tenants
- Guelph Gryphons (U Sports) (1970–present); Hamilton Tiger-Cats (CFL) (2013); Guelph United F.C. (L1ON) (2021–2022); Toronto Argonauts (CFL) (2018, 2022–present) (Note: Preseason games only.)

Alumni Stadium is a multi-purpose stadium at the University of Guelph in Guelph, Ontario, Canada. It is home to the Guelph Gryphons varsity football team. It was built in 1970, and has a fixed seating capacity of approximately 8,500, including fixed seating and the grass hill on the east side of the stadium. On October 27, 2011, it was announced that the stadium would undergo an $18 million expansion and renovation that will bring fixed seating capacity up to 7,500. It was also announced that an eight-lane track would be installed as well as synthetic turf for the field. In addition to football the Gryphons soccer teams also play their home games at the stadium.

In November 2012, the Hamilton Tiger-Cats announced they had reached a memorandum of understanding with the university to use Alumni Stadium as their temporary home in 2013 while Tim Hortons Field was constructed. The stadium underwent a temporary expansion to accommodate the Canadian Football League (CFL) team, with seating for approximately 13,000 spectators. The Tiger-Cats played 9 of 10 home games at Alumni Stadium during their 2013 season, including the 2013 East Final against the Montreal Alouettes, which they won in overtime 19–16. The Tiger-Cats went on to be the runners-up of the 101st Grey Cup at Mosaic Stadium at Taylor Field in Regina, Saskatchewan, thus ending their tenure at Alumni Stadium.

The $10.5 million, 1,300 m^{2} (14,000 sq ft) Football Pavilion addition to Alumni Stadium was completed in October 2017. The new facility features a state-of-the-art locker room, players' lounge with kitchen, therapy room with cold and hot tubs, equipment room, coaches offices, meeting rooms and a board room. The two largest meeting rooms and the roof top double as licensed, game-day viewing areas for alumni. This facility also allows for better support to football officials and the visiting teams, as well as being a study area for the players.

For two years, from 2021 to 2022, Alumni Stadium was additionally the home of the semi-professional soccer team Guelph United F.C. of League1 Ontario. Since 2022, it has also been the regular preseason home of the CFL's Toronto Argonauts.

== Gallery ==
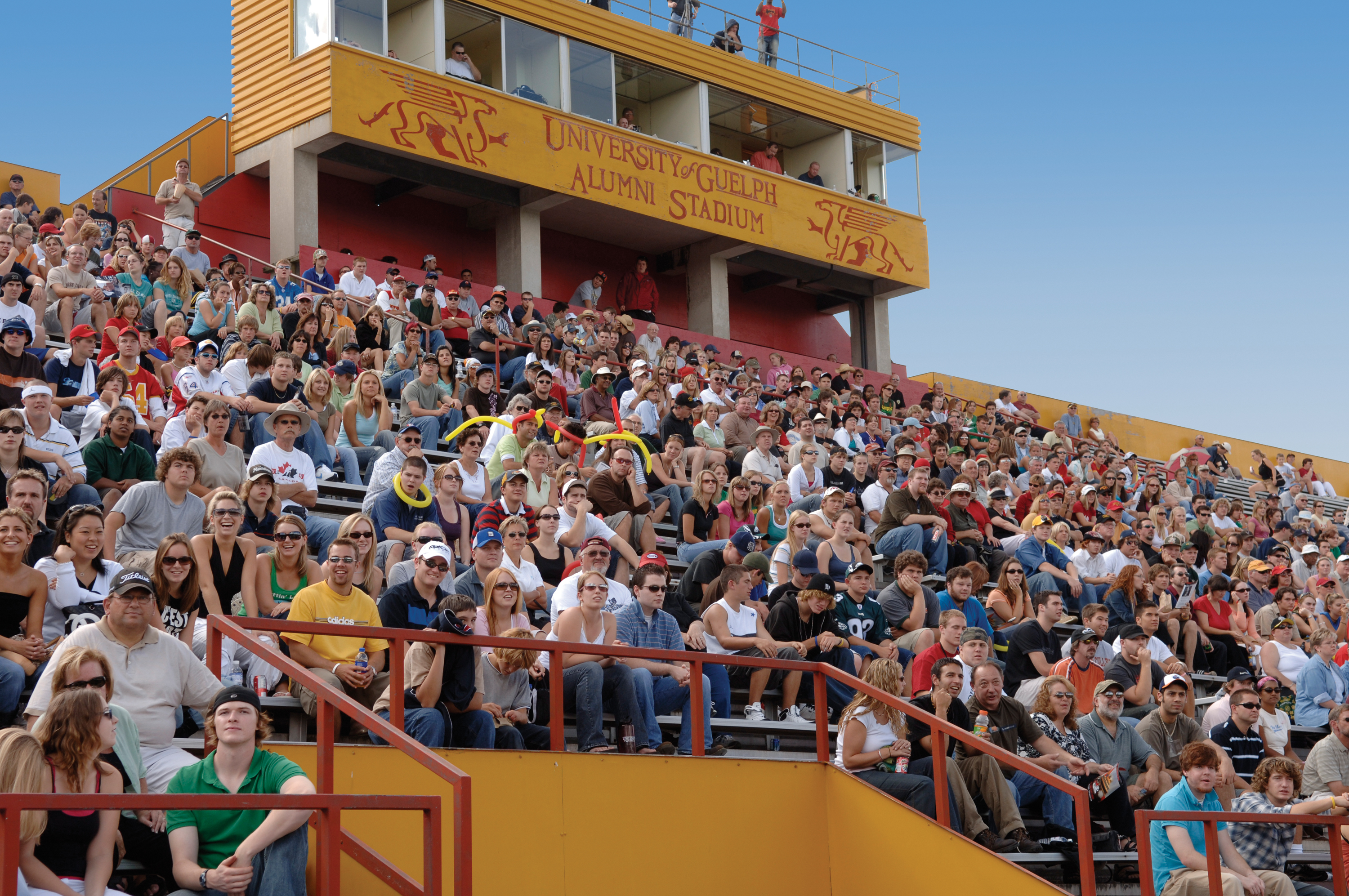
Homecoming crowd in Alumni Stadium at the University of Guelph, 2009

Centre view

End zone view

Stadium exterior
