= 2015 Calgary Stampeders season =

Canadian football team season

- Owner: Calgary Sports and Entertainment
- General manager: John Hufnagel
- Head coach: John Hufnagel
- Home stadium: McMahon Stadium

Results
- Record: 14–4
- Division place: 2nd, West
- Playoffs: Lost West Final
- Team MOP: Bo Levi Mitchell
- Team MOC: Junior Turner
- Team MOR: Tory Harrison

Uniform

The 2015 Calgary Stampeders season was the 58th season for the team in the Canadian Football League (CFL) and their 81st overall. The Stampeders finished in second place in the West Division with a 14-4 record in John Hufnagel's last year as head coach before he hands over the reins to offensive coordinator Dave Dickenson in 2016.

With Ottawa's defeat of Montreal on October 1, Calgary qualified for the playoffs for the 11th straight season. The Stampeders gained home field advantage in the 2015 West Division playoffs with their Week 15 win over the Hamilton Tiger-Cats, in the team's first visit to Tim Hortons Field. The Stampeders defeated the BC Lions in the West Semi-Final, but lost to the Edmonton Eskimos in the West Final game and failed to defend their Grey Cup title.

== Offseason ==
=== CFL draft ===
The 2015 CFL draft took place on May 12, 2015. The Stampeders had eight selections in the seven-round draft after acquiring an additional pick in the third round with the trade of Justin Phillips. Their fourth-round pick was swapped for Montreal's third-round pick after conditions were met following the Larry Taylor trade.

Round	Pick	Player	Position	School/Club team
1	9	Karl Lavoie	OL	Laval
2	18	Lemar Durant	WR	Simon Fraser
3	19	Tyler Varga	RB	Yale
3	22	Tevaughn Campbell	DB	Regina
3	27	William Langlais	FB	Sherbrooke
5	44	Dexter Janke	DB	Saskatchewan
6	53	Aaron Picton	OL	Regina
7	62	Andrew Buckley	QB	Calgary

== Preseason ==
Week	Date	Kickoff	Opponent	Results		TV	Venue	Attendance	Summary
Week	Date	Kickoff	Opponent	Score	Record	TV	Venue	Attendance	Summary
A	Bye								
B	Fri, June 12	7:30 p.m. MDT	vs. BC Lions	W 20–6	1–0	TSN2	McMahon Stadium	28,557	Recap
C	Fri, June 19	7:30 p.m. MDT	at Saskatchewan Roughriders	W 37–29	2–0	None	Mosaic Stadium	18,170	Recap

== Regular season ==
=== Standings ===
West Division
Team	GP	W	L	PF	PA	Pts	
Edmonton Eskimos	18	14	4	466	341	28	Details
Calgary Stampeders	18	14	4	478	346	28	Details
BC Lions	18	7	11	437	486	14	Details
Winnipeg Blue Bombers	18	5	13	353	502	10	Details
Saskatchewan Roughriders	18	3	15	430	563	6	Details

=== Schedule ===
Week	Date	Kickoff	Opponent	Results		TV	Venue	Attendance	Summary
Week	Date	Kickoff	Opponent	Score	Record	TV	Venue	Attendance	Summary
1	Fri, June 26	7:00 p.m. MDT	vs. Hamilton Tiger-Cats	W 24–23	1–0	TSN/RDS2/ESPN2	McMahon Stadium	28,487	Recap
2	Fri, July 3	5:30 p.m. MDT	at Montreal Alouettes	L 11–29	1–1	TSN/RDS/ESPN2	Molson Stadium	19,111	Recap
3	Mon, July 13	7:00 p.m. MDT	vs. Toronto Argonauts	W 25–20	2–1	TSN/RDS2	McMahon Stadium	26,741	Recap
4	Sat, July 18	5:00 p.m. MDT	vs. Winnipeg Blue Bombers	W 26–25	3–1	TSN	McMahon Stadium	29,255	Recap
5	Fri, July 24	5:00 p.m. MDT	at Ottawa Redblacks	L 26–29 (OT)	3–2	TSN/RDS	TD Place Stadium	23,018	Recap
6	Sat, Aug 1	5:00 p.m. MDT	vs. Montreal Alouettes	W 25–22	4–2	TSN/RDS	McMahon Stadium	28,547	Recap
7	Bye								
8	Sat, Aug 15	8:00 p.m. MDT	vs. Ottawa Redblacks	W 48–3	5–2	TSN/RDS/ESPN2	McMahon Stadium	27,566	Recap
9	Sat, Aug 22	5:00 p.m. MDT	at Saskatchewan Roughriders	W 34–31	6–2	TSN	Mosaic Stadium	33,427	Recap
10	Sat, Aug 29	4:00 p.m. MDT	at Winnipeg Blue Bombers	W 36–8	7–2	TSN/RDS2	Investors Group Field	27,148	Recap
11	Mon, Sept 7	2:30 p.m. MDT	vs. Edmonton Eskimos	W 16–7	8–2	TSN	McMahon Stadium	35,400	Recap
12	Sat, Sept 12	7:30 p.m. MDT	at Edmonton Eskimos	L 16–27	8–3	TSN/RDS2	Commonwealth Stadium	38,906	Recap
13	Fri, Sept 18	7:00 p.m. MDT	vs. BC Lions	W 35–23	9–3	TSN/RDS2	McMahon Stadium	31,586	Recap
14	Fri, Sept 25	6:30 p.m. MDT	at Winnipeg Blue Bombers	W 25–23	10–3	TSN/RDS2	Investors Group Field	23,113	Recap
15	Fri, Oct 2	5:30 p.m. MDT	at Hamilton Tiger-Cats	W 23–20	11–3	TSN/RDS2	Tim Hortons Field	24,300	Recap
16	Sat, Oct 10	5:00 p.m. MDT	vs. Edmonton Eskimos	L 11–15	11–4	TSN	McMahon Stadium	32,211	Recap
17	Sat, Oct 17	2:00 p.m. MDT	at Toronto Argonauts	W 27–15	12–4	TSN	Tim Hortons Field	3,401	Recap
18	Bye								
19	Sat, Oct 31	1:00 p.m. MDT	vs. Saskatchewan Roughriders	W 42–19	13–4	TSN/RDS2	McMahon Stadium	31,591	Recap
20	Sat, Nov 7	5:00 p.m. MST	at BC Lions	W 28–7	14–4	TSN	BC Place	22,900	Recap

== Postseason ==
=== Schedule ===
Game	Date	Kickoff	Opponent	Results		TV	Venue	Attendance	Summary
Game	Date	Kickoff	Opponent	Score	Record	TV	Venue	Attendance	Summary
West Semi-Final	Sun, Nov 15	2:30 p.m. MST	vs. BC Lions	W 35–9	1–0	TSN/RDS	McMahon Stadium	26,306	Recap
West Final	Sun, Nov 22	2:30 p.m. MST	at Edmonton Eskimos	L 31–45	1–1	TSN/RDS	Commonwealth Stadium	34,414	Recap

== Roster ==
2015 Calgary Stampeders final roster
Quarterbacks: 19 Bo Levi Mitchell; 20 Bryant Moniz; 4 Drew Tate; Running backs: 26 Rob Cote; 23 William Langlais; 33 Jerome Messam; 46 Charlie Power; 14 Matt Walter; Receivers: 87 Simon Charbonneau-Campeau; 17 Skye Dawson; 1 Lemar Durant; 16 Marquay McDaniel; 86 Anthony Parker; 80 Eric Rogers; 85 Joe West; 84 Greg Wilson	Offensive linemen: 64 Derek Dennis T; 66 John Estes G/C; 57 Karl Lavoie G; 59 Randy Richards G; 67 Garry Williams T; 50 Spencer Wilson G/T; Defensive linemen: 94 Frank Beltre DE; 95 Freddie Bishop DE; 98 Brandon Boudreaux DE; 44 Ben D'Aguilar DE; 93 Micah Johnson DT; 90 Quinn Smith DT; 7 Junior Turner DT; 97 Derek Wiggan DT	Linebackers: 51 Maleki Harris; 36 Glenn Love; 42 Deron Mayo; 48 Cameron Ontko; 47 Corbin Sharun; 12 Juwan Simpson; Defensive backs: 11 Josh Bell; 21 Adam Berger; 0 Ciante Evans; 27 Jeff Hecht; 31 Brandon McDonald; 25 Keon Raymond; 28 Brandon Smith; 41 Adam Thibault; 29 Jamar Wall	Special teams: 56 Randy Chevrier LS; 6 Rob Maver P; 30 René Paredes K; Reserve roster: 81 Jabari Arthur SB; Practice roster: 32 Tevaughn Campbell DB; -- Gord Hinse C; 40 Dexter Janke DB; 54 Paul Swiston G; -- Dimitri Tsoumpas G	Injured list: 8 Fred Bennett DB; 60 Shane Bergman G; 2 Tim Brown RB; 24 Joe Burnett DB; 9 Jon Cornish RB; 58 Brander Craighead G; 53 Brad Erdos G/C; 91 DeQuin Evans DT; 65 Dan Federkeil T; 3 Jeff Fuller WR; 62 Edwin Harrison T; 34 Tony Harrison RB; 39 Charleston Hughes DE; 88 Kamar Jorden SB; 63 Pierre Lavertu C; 99 Corey Mace DT; 45 Karl McCartney LB; 83 Nate Slaughter SB; 35 Tim St. Pierre FB; Italics indicate American player
