= 2015 Montreal Alouettes season =

Canadian football team season

- General manager: Jim Popp
- Head coach: Tom Higgins (3–5); Jim Popp (3–7)
- Home stadium: Percival Molson Memorial Stadium

Results
- Record: 6–12
- Division place: 4th, East
- Playoffs: did not qualify
- Team MOP: Stefan Logan
- Team MOC: Luc Brodeur-Jourdain
- Team MOR: Boris Bede

Uniform

The 2015 Montreal Alouettes season was the 49th season for the team in the Canadian Football League (CFL) and their 61st overall. The Alouettes finished with a 6–12 record and missed the playoffs for the first time since the franchise's re-activation in 1996. The team's training camp began May 27 with veterans reporting on May 31 at Coulter Field at the campus of Bishop's University in Sherbrooke, Quebec.

== Offseason ==
=== CFL draft ===
The 2015 CFL draft took place on May 12, 2015. The Alouettes had nine selections in the seven-round draft, including three within the first 13 picks. They acquired a first and third-round pick from the Hamilton Tiger-Cats for Ryan Bomben. They also swapped their original third-round pick for Calgary's fourth-round pick in their acquisition of Larry Taylor.

Round	Pick	Player	Position	School/Club team
1	4	Chris Ackie	DB	Wilfrid Laurier
1	8	Jacob Ruby	OL	Richmond
2	13	Nick Shortill	LB	McMaster
3	24	James Bodanis	OL	Michigan State
4	31	Brandon Bridge	QB	South Alabama
4	36	Alex Charette	WR	Guelph
5	40	Mikhail Davidson	WR	Montreal
6	48	Quinn Lawlor	DL	Brigham Young
7	57	Anthony Coady	DB	Montreal

== Preseason ==
Due to the 2015 FIFA Women's World Cup taking place in June at TD Place Stadium in Ottawa, the Redblacks hosted the Alouettes for their home pre-season game at Telus Stadium in Quebec City, Quebec on the campus of the Université Laval. It was the second game that the Alouettes played in Quebec City, with the first being in 2003.

Week	Date	Kickoff	Opponent	Results		TV	Venue	Attendance	Summary
Week	Date	Kickoff	Opponent	Score	Record	TV	Venue	Attendance	Summary
A	Bye								
B	Sat, June 13	7:30 p.m. EDT	at Ottawa Redblacks	W 26–9	1–0	RDS	Telus Stadium (in Quebec City)	4,778	Recap
C	Thurs, June 18	7:30 p.m. EDT	vs. Toronto Argonauts	L 10–30	1–1	TSN2/RDS	Molson Stadium	16,325	Recap

# Games played with colour uniforms.

== Regular season ==
=== Standings ===
East Division
Team	GP	W	L	PF	PA	Pts	
Ottawa Redblacks	18	12	6	464	454	24	Details
Hamilton Tiger-Cats	18	10	8	530	391	20	Details
Toronto Argonauts	18	10	8	438	499	20	Details
Montreal Alouettes	18	6	12	388	402	12	Details

=== Schedule ===
Week	Date	Kickoff	Opponent	Results		TV	Venue	Attendance	Summary
Week	Date	Kickoff	Opponent	Score	Record	TV	Venue	Attendance	Summary
1	Thurs, June 25	7:30 p.m. EDT	vs. Ottawa Redblacks	L 16–20	0–1	TSN/RDS/ESPN2	Molson Stadium	21,524	Recap
2	Fri, July 3	7:30 p.m. EDT	vs. Calgary Stampeders	W 29–11	1–1	TSN/RDS/ESPN2	Molson Stadium	19,111	Recap
3	Fri, July 10	7:00 p.m. EDT	at Winnipeg Blue Bombers	L 23–25	1–2	TSN/RDS/ESPN2	Investors Group Field	25,605	Recap
4	Thurs, July 16	7:30 p.m. EDT	vs. Hamilton Tiger-Cats	W 17–13	2–2	TSN/RDS	Molson Stadium	20,773	Recap
5	Bye								
6	Sat, Aug 1	7:00 p.m. EDT	at Calgary Stampeders	L 22–25	2–3	TSN/RDS	McMahon Stadium	28,547	Recap
7	Fri, Aug 7	7:30 p.m. EDT	at Ottawa Redblacks	L 23–26	2–4	TSN/RDS/ESPN2	TD Place Stadium	24,427	Recap
8	Thurs, Aug 13	7:30 p.m. EDT	vs. Edmonton Eskimos	L 12–15	2–5	TSN/RDS/ESPN2	Molson Stadium	21,170	Recap
9	Thurs, Aug 20	10:00 p.m. EDT	at BC Lions	W 23–13	3–5	TSN/RDS	BC Place	20,977	Recap
10	Thurs, Aug 27	7:30 p.m. EDT	at Hamilton Tiger-Cats	W 26–23	4–5	TSN/RDS/ESPN2	Tim Hortons Field	24,212	Recap
11	Thurs, Sept 3	7:30 p.m. EDT	vs. BC Lions	L 16–25	4–6	TSN/RDS	Molson Stadium	21,885	Recap
12	Bye								
13	Sun, Sept 20	1:00 p.m. EDT	vs. Winnipeg Blue Bombers	W 35–14	5–6	TSN/RDS	Molson Stadium	23,262	Recap
14	Sun, Sept 27	4:00 p.m. EDT	at Saskatchewan Roughriders	L 21–33	5–7	TSN/RDS	Mosaic Stadium	30,843	Recap
15	Thurs, Oct 1	7:30 p.m. EDT	at Ottawa Redblacks	L 17–39	5–8	TSN/RDS	TD Place Stadium	21,607	Recap
16	Mon, Oct 12	1:00 p.m. EDT	vs. Toronto Argonauts	L 17–25	5–9	TSN/RDS	Molson Stadium	21,536	Recap
17	Sun, Oct 18	1:00 p.m. EDT	vs. Hamilton Tiger-Cats	L 11–23	5–10	TSN/RDS/ESPN2	Molson Stadium	23,058	Recap
18	Fri, Oct 23	7:00 p.m. EDT	at Toronto Argonauts	W 34–2	6–10	TSN/RDS2	Tim Hortons Field	3,741	Recap
19	Sun, Nov 1	4:00 p.m. EST	at Edmonton Eskimos	L 22–40	6–11	TSN/RDS	Commonwealth Stadium	31,014	Recap
20	Sun, Nov 8	1:00 p.m. EST	vs. Saskatchewan Roughriders	L 24–30 (OT)	6–12	TSN/RDS	Molson Stadium	20,551	Recap

# Games played with colour uniforms.
# Games played with white uniforms.
# Games played with alternate uniforms.

== Roster ==
2015 Montreal Alouettes final roster
Quarterbacks: 6 Anthony Boone; 21 Tajh Boyd; 4 Tanner Marsh; Running backs: 46 Jean-Christophe Beaulieu; 0 Stefan Logan; 33 Brandon Rutley; 37 Tyrell Sutton; Receivers: 84 Alex Charette; 85 B. J. Cunningham; 88 Mikhail Davidson; 15 Sam Giguère; 81 Kyle Graves; 3 Cody Hoffman; 80 Jonathon Rumph	Offensive linemen: 68 Philip Blake G; 65 Vincent Brown T/G; 64 Forrestal Hickman T; 51 Kristian Matte G/C; 54 Jeff Perrett T; 62 Jake Piotrowski G; 69 Jacob Ruby T; Defensive linemen: 93 James Bodanis DT; 7 John Bowman DE; 45 Brian Brikowski DE; 91 Alan-Michael Cash DT; 99 Jesse Joseph DT; 55 Gabe Knapton DE; 30 James Tuck DE/FB	Linebackers: 35 Chris Ackie; 42 Jean-Samuel Blanc; 52 Nicolas Boulay; 11 Chip Cox; 41 Kyler Ellsworth; 26 Nick Shortill; Defensive backs: 10 Marc-Olivier Brouillette; 40 Anthony Coady; 22 Cliff Coleman; 38 Dominique Ellis; 17 Billy Parker; 36 Daryl Townsend; 32 Mitchell White	Special teams: 37 Martin Bédard LS; 14 Boris Bede K/P; Reserve list: 1 Brandon Bridge QB; 44 Andrew Lue; Practice roster: 16 Will Brown DB; 44 Jewel Hampton RB; 87 Kelvin Muamba WR; -- Mycal Swaim DB; Suspended list: 0 Justin Caliste SB; 85 Chad Johnson WR; 94 Michael Sam DE	Injured list: 59 Josh Bourke T; 58 Luc Brodeur-Jourdain C; 39 Jerald Brown DB; 12 Rakeem Cato QB; 18 Jonathan Crompton QB; 9 Éric Deslauriers WR; 49 Jeff Finley DT; 3 Mardy Gilyard WR; 5 Kevin Glenn QB; 19 S. J. Green SB; 34 Kyries Hebert LB; 23 Jonathan Hefney DB; 95 Corvey Irvin DT; 90 Mike Klassen DT; 25 Jamahl Knowles DB; 97 Aaron Lavarias DE; 67 Quinn Lawlor G; 5 Dan LeFevour QB; 8 Nik Lewis SB; 50 Henoc Muamba LB; 83 Andrew Smith WR; 16 Brandon Smith DB; 2 Fred Stamps WR; 31 Winston Venable LB; 29 Carl Volny RB; 61 Ryan White T/G; 48 Bear Woods LB; Italics indicate International players

== Coaching staff ==
2015 Montreal Alouettes staff
Front office: Owner – Bob Wetenhall; CEO – Mark Weightman; VP, General Manager and Director of Football Operations and Player Personnel – Jim Popp; Assistant director of football operations and player personnel – Joey Abrams; Assistant director of pro/college scouting – Uzooma Okeke; Senior Player Personnel Executive/Salary Cap Analyst - Justin Casey; Pro/College Scout – Jean-Marc Edme; Director of US College Scouting - Russ Lande; Football Operations Assistant/Scout - Jean-Vincent Posy-Audette; Head coaches: Head coach – Jim Popp; Assistant head coach – Noel Thorpe; Offensive coaches: Co-Offensive Coordinator / Running Backs – Ryan Dinwiddie; Co-Offensive Coordinator / Quarterbacks – Anthony Calvillo; Offensive line – Kris Sweet; Receivers – André Bolduc	Defensive coaches: Defensive coordinator/defensive backs – Noel Thorpe; Defensive line – Keith Willis; Linebackers – Chris Tormey; Defensive quality control – Anwar Stewart; Special teams coaches: Special teams coordinator – Kavis Reed; Special teams assistant – André Bolduc; → Coaching staff
