= 2015 Edmonton Eskimos season =

Canadian football team season

- General manager: Ed Hervey
- Head coach: Chris Jones
- Home stadium: Commonwealth Stadium; SMS Equipment Stadium (preseason)

Results
- Record: 14–4
- Division place: 1st, West
- Playoffs: Won Grey Cup
- Team MOP: Mike Reilly, QB
- Team MOC: Sean Whyte, P/K
- Team MOR: Derel Walker, WR

Uniform

The 2015 Edmonton Eskimos season was the 58th season for the team in the Canadian Football League (CFL) and their 67th overall. The Eskimos finished with a 14–4 record and in first place in the West Division for the first time since 2003. The team won the franchise's 14th Grey Cup championship 26–20 over the Ottawa Redblacks in their first Grey Cup appearance since 2005.

== Offseason ==
=== CFL draft ===
The 2015 CFL draft took place on May 12.

Round	Pick	Player	Position	School/Club team
1	7	Danny Groulx	OL	Laval
2	16	David Beard	OL	Alberta
3	25	Adam Konar	LB	Calgary
4	34	Andrew Johnson	WR	Fort Lewis College
7	60	Blair Smith	LB	Angelo State

=== Notable transactions ===
Date	Type	Incoming	Outgoing	Team
May 11	Trade	Cory Watson (SB); 2nd round pick in 2016 CFL draft – Trent Corney (DL) (Note: Later traded to the Winnipeg Blue Bombers)	Jorgen Hus (LS); 3rd round pick in 2016 CFL draft – Quinn van Glyswyk (K)	Saskatchewan Roughriders
September 2	Trade	Conditional 7th round pick in 2017 CFL draft (Note: Later traded to the Hamilton Tiger-Cats)	Matt Nichols (QB)	Winnipeg Blue Bombers
September 3	Trade	Brian Simmons (OL)	Conditional 7th round pick in 2017 CFL draft	Hamilton Tiger-Cats
September 9	Trade	Christopher Greaves (OL)	Selvish Capers (OL); 2nd round pick in 2016 CFL draft – Trent Corney (DL)	Winnipeg Blue Bombers
September 21	Trade	Conditional draft pick in 2017 CFL draft	Skye Dawson (SB/KR); Conditional draft pick in 2017 CFL draft	Calgary Stampeders

== Preseason ==
On June 14, 2013, it was announced that the Edmonton Eskimos would host their 2015 preseason game at the new Shell Place in Fort McMurray against the Saskatchewan Roughriders on June 13, 2015. As part of the deal, the game was broadcast nationally on TSN. The game was played here due to scheduling conflicts with the 2015 FIFA Women's World Cup at Commonwealth Stadium and to broaden the Eskimos' fanbase. The Eskimos' second pre-season game, against the BC Lions, was also displaced from BC Place due to the Women's World Cup. That game was instead played at Thunderbird Stadium on the main campus of the University of British Columbia.

Week	Date	Kickoff	Opponent	Results		TV	Venue	Attendance	Summary
Week	Date	Kickoff	Opponent	Score	Record	TV	Venue	Attendance	Summary
A	Bye								
B	Sat, June 13	8:00 p.m. MDT	vs. Saskatchewan Roughriders	W 31–24	1–0	TSN	Shell Place (in Fort McMurray)	11,825	Recap
C	Fri, June 19	8:00 p.m. MDT	at BC Lions	W 18–13	2–0	None	Thunderbird Stadium	6,117	Recap

== Regular season ==
=== Season standings ===
West Division
Team	GP	W	L	PF	PA	Pts	
Edmonton Eskimos	18	14	4	466	341	28	Details
Calgary Stampeders	18	14	4	478	346	28	Details
BC Lions	18	7	11	437	486	14	Details
Winnipeg Blue Bombers	18	5	13	353	502	10	Details
Saskatchewan Roughriders	18	3	15	430	563	6	Details

=== Season schedule ===
Week	Date	Kickoff	Opponent	Results		Stk	TV	Venue	Attendance	Summary
Week	Date	Kickoff	Opponent	Score	Record	Stk	TV	Venue	Attendance	Summary
1	Sat, June 27	3:00 p.m. MDT	at Toronto Argonauts	L 11–26	0–1	L1	TSN	SMS Equipment Stadium (in Fort McMurray)	4,900	Recap
2	Bye									
3	Thurs, July 9	7:00 p.m. MDT	vs. Ottawa Redblacks	W 46–17	1–1	W1	TSN/RDS2/ESPN2	Commonwealth Stadium	29,904	Recap
4	Fri, July 17	5:00 p.m. MDT	at Ottawa Redblacks	W 23–12	2–1	W2	TSN/RDS	TD Place Stadium	21,078	Recap
5	Sat, July 25	5:00 p.m. MDT	vs. Winnipeg Blue Bombers	W 32–3	3–1	W3	TSN	Commonwealth Stadium	27,895	Recap
6	Fri, July 31	7:00 p.m. MDT	vs. Saskatchewan Roughriders	W 30–5	4–1	W4	TSN/RDS/ESPN2	Commonwealth Stadium	37,842	Recap
7	Thurs, Aug 6	8:00 p.m. MDT	at BC Lions	L 23–26	4–2	L1	TSN/RDS2/ESPN2	BC Place	20,316	Recap
8	Thurs, Aug 13	5:30 p.m. MDT	at Montreal Alouettes	W 15–12	5–2	W1	TSN/RDS/ESPN2	Molson Stadium	21,170	Recap
9	Fri, Aug 21	7:00 p.m. MDT	vs. Hamilton Tiger-Cats	L 20–49	5–3	L1	TSN	Commonwealth Stadium	28,858	Recap
10	Fri, Aug 28	7:00 p.m. MDT	vs. Toronto Argonauts	W 38–15	6–3	W1	TSN/RDS/ESPN2	Commonwealth Stadium	31,573	Recap
11	Mon, Sept 7	2:30 p.m. MDT	at Calgary Stampeders	L 7–16	6–4	L1	TSN	McMahon Stadium	35,400	Recap
12	Sat, Sept 12	7:30 p.m. MDT	vs. Calgary Stampeders	W 27–16	7–4	W1	TSN/RDS2	Commonwealth Stadium	38,906*	Recap
13	Sat, Sept 19	2:00 p.m. MDT	at Hamilton Tiger-Cats	W 25–18	8–4	W2	TSN	Tim Hortons Field	24,300	Recap
14	Sat, Sept 26	2:00 p.m. MDT	vs. BC Lions	W 29–23	9–4	W3	TSN	Commonwealth Stadium	29,148	Recap
15	Sat, Oct 3	2:00 p.m. MDT	at Winnipeg Blue Bombers	W 24–23	10–4	W4	TSN	Investors Group Field	24,179	Recap
16	Sat, Oct 10	5:00 p.m. MDT	at Calgary Stampeders	W 15–11	11–4	W5	TSN	McMahon Stadium	32,211	Recap
17	Sat, Oct 17	5:00 p.m. MDT	vs. BC Lions	W 26–23 (2OT)	12–4	W6	TSN	Commonwealth Stadium	28,517	Recap
18	Sat, Oct 24	5:00 p.m. MDT	at Saskatchewan Roughriders	W 35–24	13–4	W7	TSN/RDS2	Mosaic Stadium	30,488	Recap
19	Sun, Nov 1	2:00 p.m. MST	vs. Montreal Alouettes	W 40–22	14–4	W8	TSN/RDS	Commonwealth Stadium	31,014	Recap
20	Bye									

*Top attendance in CFL

Total attendance: 283,656
Average attendance: 31,517 (56.0%)

== Postseason ==
=== Schedule ===
Game	Date	Kickoff	Opponent	Results		TV	Venue	Attendance	Summary
Game	Date	Kickoff	Opponent	Score	Record	TV	Venue	Attendance	Summary
West Semi-Final	Bye								
West Final	Sun, Nov 22	2:30 p.m. MST	vs. Calgary Stampeders	W 45–31	1–0	TSN/RDS	Commonwealth Stadium	34,414	Recap
103rd Grey Cup	Sun, Nov 29	4:00 p.m. MST	Ottawa Redblacks	W 26–20	2–0	TSN/RDS/ESPN2	Investors Group Field	36,634	Recap

== Roster ==
2015 Edmonton Eskimos final roster
Quarterbacks: 14 James Franklin; 5 Jordan Lynch; 13 Mike Reilly; Running backs: 32 Kendial Lawrence; 31 Calvin McCarty; 25 Mike Miller; 28 Aaron Milton; 24 Akeem Shavers; Receivers: 4 Adarius Bowman; 17 Shamawd Chambers; 85 Nate Coehoorn; 7 Kenny Stafford; 87 Derel Walker; 18 Cory Watson	Offensive linemen: 67 D'Anthony Batiste T; 62 Chris Greaves G/T; 64 Andrew Jones G; 66 Matt O'Donnell G; 60 Justin Sorensen C; 58 Tony Washington T; Defensive linemen: 77 Mathieu Boulay DE; 91 Marcus Howard DE; 99 Willie Jefferson DE; 92 Cedric McKinley DT; 90 Almondo Sewell DT; 97 Eddie Steele DT/G; 41 Odell Willis DE	Linebackers: 27 Mike Dubuisson; 44 Korey Jones; 40 Deon Lacey; 45 Dexter McCoil; 47 J. C. Sherritt; 48 Blair Smith; Defensive backs: 37 Otha Foster; 36 Aaron Grymes; 20 Raye Hartmann; 34 Ryan Hinds; 8 Cauchy Muamba; 26 John Ojo; 8 Pat Watkins; 23 Marcell Young	Special teams: 53 Ryan King LS; 11 Grant Shaw K/P; 6 Sean Whyte K/P; Reserve roster: 59 Brian Simmons T; Practice roster: 73 Anthony Barrett WR; 15 Deion Belue DB; 29 Michael Carter DB; 82 Sederrik Cunningham WR; 12 Aaron Hester DB; 84 Andrew Johnson WR; 3 Wallace Miles SB; 96 Sam Montgomery DE; 19 Greg Morris RB; 22 Kacy Rodgers DB	Injured list: 95 Gregory Alexandre DT; 81 Devon Bailey WR; 57 David Beard G; 33 Shakir Bell RB; 68 Thaddeus Coleman T; 2 Nic Grigsby RB; 50 Danny Groulx G; 38 Adam Konar LB; 52 Alexander Krausnick G/C; 55 Elie Ngoyi DE; 93 Don Oramasionwu DT; 63 Brian Ramsay G/C; 65 Simeon Rottier G; 10 Chad Simpson RB; 30 John White RB; 66 Greg Wojt G; Italics indicate International player Transactions

== Coaching staff ==
2015 Edmonton Eskimos staff
Front office: President and ceo – Len Rhodes; Director of football operations – Ryan Wagner; General manager – Ed Hervey; Executive director of player personnel – Paul Jones; Manager of football operations and canadian scouting – vacant; Head scout – Chris Jones; Head canadian scout – Rob Ralph; Head coach: Head coach – Chris Jones; Offensive coaches: Offensive coordinator – Steve McAdoo; Offensive line and run game coordinator – Mike Scheper; Quarterbacks, passing game coordinator and player development – Jarious Jackson; Running backs/ and special teams assistant – Craig Davoren; Receivers – Kez McCorvey	Defensive coaches: Defensive coordinator – Chris Jones; Linebackers – Phillip Lolley; Defensive backs – Jason Shivers; Defensive line – Ed Philion; Special teams coaches: Special teams coordinator – Craig Dickenson; Strength and conditioning: Strength and conditioning trainer – Mike Cook; → Coaching staff
