= Connop =

Connop is both a given name and a surname. Notable people with the name include:

== Given name ==
- Connop Guthrie (1882–1945), British businessman and public servant
- Connop Price (1912–1998), English Anglican priest
- Connop Thirlwall (1797–1875), English churchman

== Surname ==
- Rod Connop (born 1959), Canadian football player
- Rory Connop (born 1990), Canadian football player
