= Jake Harty =

Canadian football player (born 1991)

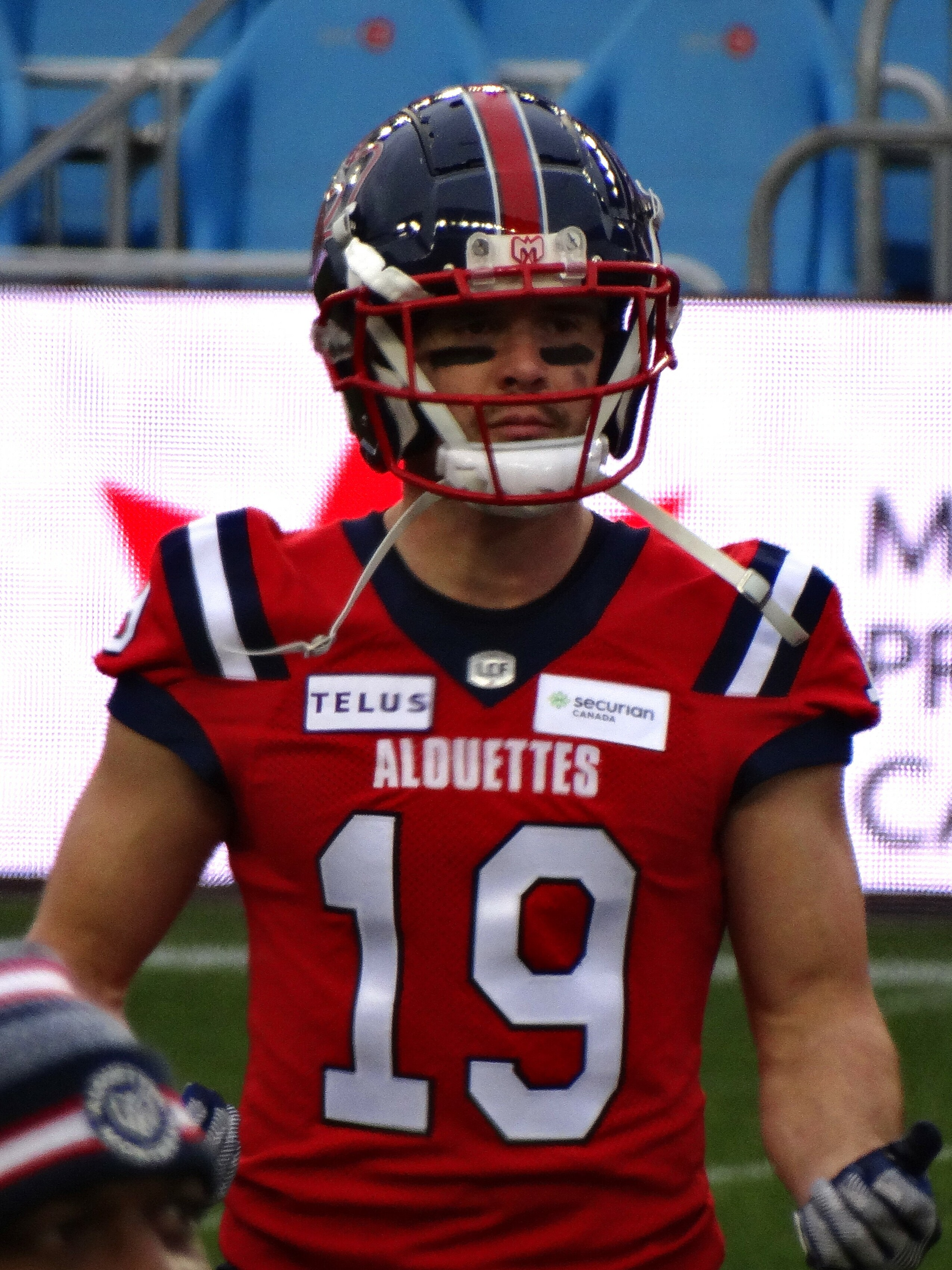
- Harty with the Montreal Alouettes in 2023

Profile
- Position: Wide receiver

Personal information
- Born: January 2, 1991 (age 35); Calgary, Alberta, Canada
- Listed height: 6 ft 2 in (1.88 m)
- Listed weight: 210 lb (95 kg)

Career information
- High school: Henry Wise Wood High
- CJFL: Calgary Colts
- University: Calgary
- CFL draft: 2015: 2nd round, 10th overall pick

Career history

Playing
- 2015–2017: Ottawa Redblacks
- 2018–2022: Saskatchewan Roughriders
- 2023: Montreal Alouettes
- 2024: BC Lions*
- * Offseason or practice squad member only

Coaching
- 2019: Calgary Dinos (ARC)

Awards and highlights
- 2× Grey Cup champion (2016, 2023); Vanier Cup champion (2019)
- Stats at CFL.ca

Jake Paul Harty (born January 2, 1991) is a Canadian professional football wide receiver. He is a Grey Cup champion after winning with the Ottawa Redblacks in 2016 and with Montreal Alouettes in 2023. He is also a Vanier Cup champion as a coach after the Calgary Dinos won the 55th Vanier Cup in 2019.

== Amateur career ==
After graduating from Henry Wise Wood High School in 2009, Harty played junior football for the Calgary Colts of the Canadian Junior Football League. He was named the Rookie of the Year for the Colts in 2009 and had 24 catches for 412 yards and three touchdowns in the 2010 season.

Harty joined the Calgary Dinos for the 2011 season and played for the program for four years. He was part of three straight Hardy Cup championship teams, including the 2012 Hardy Cup where he set a school-record for receptions with 15 in a single game. He also appeared in the 49th Vanier Cup where he led all receivers with nine receptions for 112 yards and also had two rush attempts for 24 yards and one touchdown. However, the Dinos lost to Laval in Harty's only appearance in a Vanier Cup game.

== Professional career ==
=== Ottawa Redblacks ===
Harty was eligible for the 2015 CFL draft and was ranked by the CFL Central Scouting Bureau as the 18th best player available in the draft. He was then drafted in the second round, 10th overall, by the Ottawa Redblacks and signed with the team on May 20, 2015. He spent most of the 2015 season on the injured list, but made his professional debut on November 1, 2015 against the Hamilton Tiger-Cats. He also played in the last regular season game of the year, one week later, before making his post-season debut on November 22, 2015 which was also against the Tiger-Cats. Harty played in his first Grey Cup game in his rookie year, where he recorded one forced fumble and one special teams tackle, but the Redblacks lost to the Edmonton Eskimos in the 103rd Grey Cup championship.

In 2016, Harty made the team's opening day roster and he recorded his first career catch in a Grey Cup rematch victory on June 25, 2016 against the Edmonton Eskimos. He played in 14 regular season games where he totaled nine receptions for 81 yards. He again played in two post-season games in 2016, but did not record any catches. However, in the 104th Grey Cup, he again had a special teams tackle and a forced fumble, the latter of which led to a Redblacks' touchdown early in the second quarter. The Redblacks defeated the Calgary Stampeders in overtime and Harty won his first Grey Cup championship.

Harty played in all 18 regular season games in 2017 as he was featured more prominently in the team's offence. He recorded his first career professional touchdown on a three-yard reception from Trevor Harris on August 18, 2017 against the Hamilton Tiger-Cats. For the season, he had 27 catches for 226 yards and one touchdown. He also had two carries for eight rushing yards and six special teams tackles that year. He played in the East Semi-Final loss to the Saskatchewan Roughriders where he recorded two catches for 13 yards. Following the completion of his three-year rookie contract, Harty became a free agent on February 13, 2018.

=== Saskatchewan Roughriders ===
On February 18, 2018, Harty signed a two-year contract with the Saskatchewan Roughriders. However, he suffered a torn ACL on the opening day of training camp that year and missed the entire 2018 season due to injury. During rehabilitation seven months later, he tore the same ligament and had to miss the entire 2019 season as well. While he recovered, he joined the Calgary Dinos as an assistant receivers coach and helped the Dinos win the 55th Vanier Cup. He did not play in 2020 due to the cancellation of the 2020 CFL season. He made his long-awaited debut with the Roughriders on August 6, 2021. He became a free agent upon the expiry of his contract on February 14, 2023.

=== Montreal Alouettes ===
On February 21, 2023, it was announced that Harty had signed with the Montreal Alouettes. He played in 14 regular season games, including three starts, where he had four receptions for 36 yards. In February 2024, he became a free agent.

=== BC Lions ===
On February 13, 2024, it was announced that Harty had signed a one-year contract with the BC Lions. On May 12, 2024, Harty was suspended by the CFL. He remained on the suspended list for the entire 2024 season and became a free agent upon the expiry of his contract on February 11, 2025.

== Personal life ==
Harty was born in Calgary, Alberta to parents Dave and Kim.
