= Mateas =

Mateas is a surname and a given name. Notable people with the name include:

- Alex Mateas (born 1991), Canadian football player
- Maria Mateas (born 1999), Romanian-American tennis player
- Mateas Delić (born 1988), Croatian footballer
