= Brandon Tennant =

Canadian football player (born 1991)

No. 91
- Position: Defensive lineman

Personal information
- Born: July 2, 1991 (age 35); Lachine, Quebec
- Listed height: 6 ft 2 in (1.88 m)
- Listed weight: 305 lb (138 kg)

Career information
- University: Laval
- CFL draft: 2015: 7th round, 59th overall pick

Career history
- 2015–2016: Saskatchewan Roughriders
- Stats at CFL.ca

Brandon Tennant (born July 2, 1991) is a Canadian football defensive lineman, who is currently playing for the Winnipeg Blue Bombers. He was drafted by the Roughriders in the seventh round of the 2015 CFL draft, 59th overall. He played CIS football for the Laval Rouge et Or from 2011 to 2014, where he won two Vanier Cup championships.
