= Brett Boyko =

Canadian gridiron football player (born 1992)

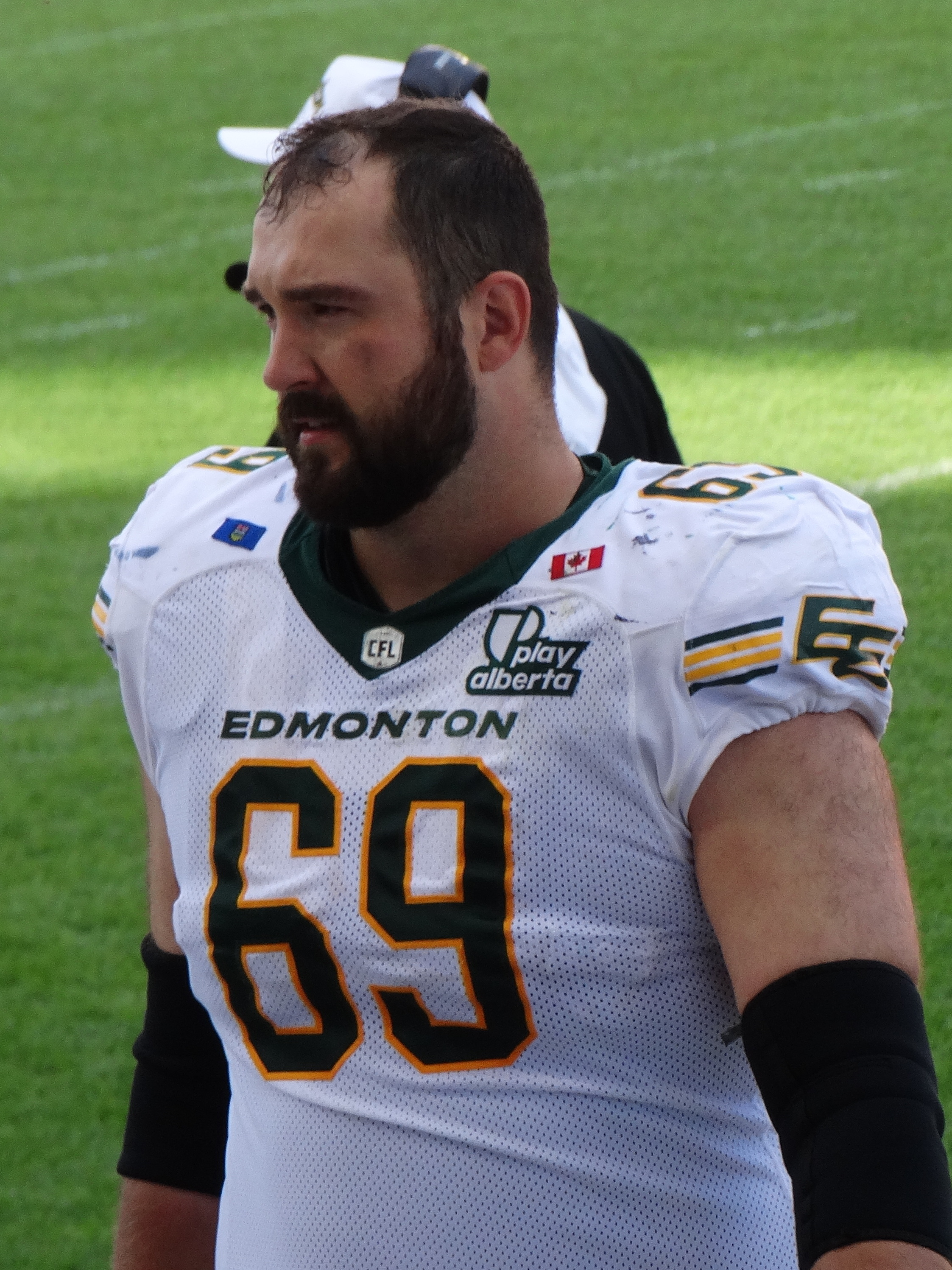
- Boyko with the Edmonton Elks in 2025

No. 69 – Edmonton Elks
- Position: Offensive lineman
- Roster status: Active
- CFL status: National

Personal information
- Born: August 4, 1992 (age 34); Saskatoon, Saskatchewan, Canada
- Listed height: 6 ft 7 in (2.01 m)
- Listed weight: 305 lb (138 kg)

Career information
- High school: St. Joseph (Saskatoon)
- College: UNLV
- CFL draft: 2015: 2nd round, 14th overall pick

Career history
- 2015–2016: Philadelphia Eagles*
- 2016–2017: San Diego / Los Angeles Chargers
- 2019: San Diego Fleet
- 2019–2020: BC Lions
- 2021: Saskatchewan Roughriders
- 2023: Orlando Guardians
- 2023–present: Edmonton Elks
- * Offseason or practice squad member only

Awards and highlights
- Grey Cup champion (2026); Second-team All-MWC (2014)
- Stats at Pro Football Reference
- Stats at CFL.ca

Brett Boyko (born August 4, 1992) is a Canadian professional football offensive lineman for the Edmonton Elks of the Canadian Football League (CFL). He has also been a member of the Philadelphia Eagles and San Diego / Los Angeles Chargers of the National Football League (NFL), San Diego Fleet of the Alliance of American Football (AAF), BC Lions and Saskatchewan Roughriders of the CFL, and Orlando Guardians of the XFL. He played college football for the UNLV Rebels.

== Professional career ==
Pre-draft measurables
Height	Weight	Arm length	Hand span	Wingspan	40-yard dash	10-yard split	20-yard split	20-yard shuttle	Three-cone drill	Vertical jump	Broad jump	Bench press
6 ft 6 5/8 in (2.00 m)	301 lb (137 kg)	32 in (0.81 m)	9 in (0.23 m)	6 ft 7 3/8 in (2.02 m)	5.51 s	1.84 s	3.10 s	4.75 s	7.91 s	26.5 in (0.67 m)	9 ft 0 in (2.74 m)	17 reps
All values from NFL Combine/Pro Day

=== CFL and NFL drafts ===
Prior to the 2015 NFL draft Boyko gained interest from several NFL teams and he also participated in the NFL Scouting Combine in Indianapolis, in February 2015. Boyko was ranked as the number one overall prospect in the Canadian Football League Scouting Bureau's September rankings heading into the 2015 CFL draft and later fell to 2nd place in the December rankings. The uncertainty of whether he would stay in the NFL led Boyko to get drafted 14th overall in the 2015 CFL draft by the BC Lions. Despite the interest, Boyko was not drafted by any team in the 2015 NFL draft.

=== Philadelphia Eagles ===
Boyko was signed by the Philadelphia Eagles as an undrafted free agent on May 2, 2015. On September 4, 2015, Boyko was cut in the last round on preseason cuts. On September 6, 2015, Boyko was signed to the Philadelphia Eagles practice squad. On May 17, 2016, Boyko was released by the Eagles.

=== San Diego / Los Angeles Chargers ===
On June 2, 2016, Boyko signed with the Chargers. On September 3, 2016, he was released by the Chargers. He was signed to the Chargers' practice squad on October 4, 2016. He signed a reserve/future contract with the Chargers on January 3, 2017. On September 2, 2017, Boyko was waived by the Chargers and was signed to the practice squad the next day. He was promoted to the active roster on December 19, 2017. He was waived by the Chargers on December 29, 2017. He signed a reserve/future contract with the Chargers on January 1, 2018. On September 1, 2018, Boyko was waived by the Chargers.

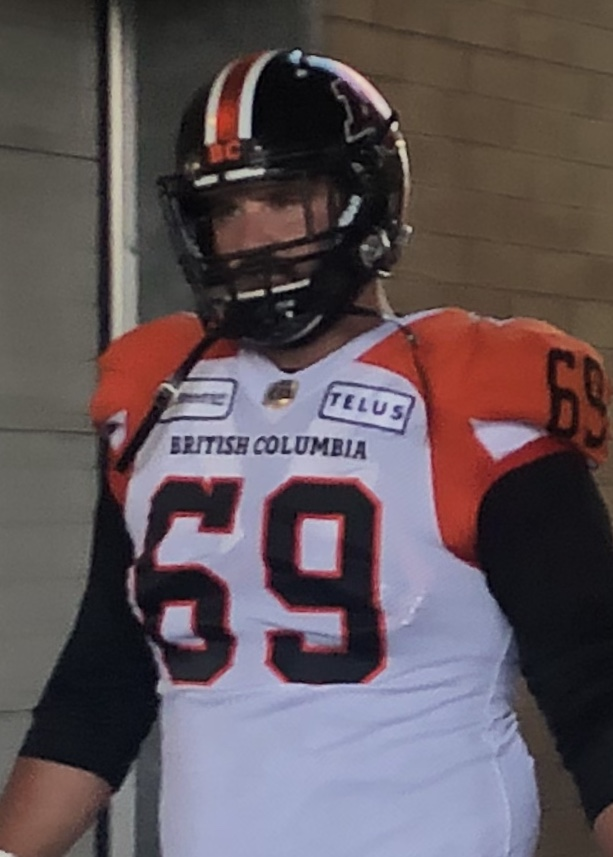
Boyko with the BC Lions in 2019

=== San Diego Fleet ===
On December 2, 2018, Boyko signed with the San Diego Fleet of the Alliance of American Football (AAF). The league subsequently folded partway through its inaugural season, leaving Boyko as a free agent.

=== BC Lions ===
On May 15, 2019, Boyko signed with the BC Lions of the Canadian Football League (CFL). He played in 15 games and started in five in 2019. He did not play in 2020 due to the cancellation of the 2020 CFL season and was released on February 12, 2021.

=== Saskatchewan Roughriders ===
Boyko signed with the Saskatchewan Roughriders on March 1, 2021. He played in eight games in 2021 and became a free agent upon the expiry of his contract on February 8, 2022.

=== Orlando Guardians ===
On March 2, 2023, Boyko signed with the Orlando Guardians. He was released from his contract on July 7, 2023.

=== Edmonton Elks ===
Boyko signed with the Edmonton Elks of the CFL on July 3, 2023. He was released on January 30, 2025, but was signed back on February 2, 2025.
