= Addison Richards (Canadian football) =

Canadian football player (born 1993)

No. 86
- Position: Wide receiver

Personal information
- Born: September 28, 1993 (age 33); Regina, Saskatchewan, Canada
- Listed height: 6 ft 4 in (1.93 m)
- Listed weight: 212 lb (96 kg)

Career information
- University: Regina
- CFL draft: 2015: 2nd round, 11th overall pick

Career history
- 2015–2017: Winnipeg Blue Bombers
- Stats at CFL.ca

Addison Richards (born September 28, 1993) is a Canadian former professional football wide receiver who played for the Winnipeg Blue Bombers of the Canadian Football League (CFL). Richards was drafted 11th overall by the Winnipeg Blue Bombers in the 2015 CFL draft. Richards played CIS football with the Regina Rams.
