= Mike Dubuisson =

Canadian football player (born 1991)

No. 19
- Position: Defensive back

Personal information
- Born: September 30, 1991 (age 35); Montreal, Quebec, Canada
- Listed height: 6 ft 3 in (1.91 m)
- Listed weight: 220 lb (100 kg)

Career information
- High school: Antoine De Saint-Exupery
- University: Montreal; Windsor

Career history
- 2014–2016: Edmonton Eskimos
- 2017: Saskatchewan Roughriders
- 2018–2019: BC Lions
- 2021–2023: Edmonton Elks

Awards and highlights
- Grey Cup champion (2015)
- Stats at CFL.ca

Mike Dubuisson (born September 30, 1991) is a Canadian professional football defensive back. He previously played CIS football for the University of Montreal and the University of Windsor.

== College career ==
Dubuisson played college football for the Montreal Carabins in 2011 and the Windsor Lancers in 2013. Between his two college seasons, he achieved 58 tackles, six interceptions, and one sack.

== Professional career ==
=== Edmonton Eskimos ===
The Edmonton Eskimos acquired Dubuisson through the 2014 CFL Supplemental Draft, which is an auction-style draft used to allocate players who did not receive approval as a national player by the time of the 2014 CFL draft. The Eskimos gave up a fifth round pick in the 2015 CFL draft to receive Dubuisson. In his rookie year, he played in all 18 regular season games for the Eskimos, and was active on special teams in their post-season West Semi-Final game. In 2015, he dressed in all 18 regular season games again, registering seven special teams tackles. He also played in the West Final and 103rd Grey Cup, earning his first Grey Cup championship. He played in 17 games in 2016 where he had two defensive tackles and three special teams tackles.

=== Saskatchewan Roughriders ===
Dubuisson signed with the Saskatchewan Roughriders in 2017, but saw action in only two games, making four defensive tackles and one special teams tackle in those outings.

=== BC Lions ===
Dubuisson signed with the BC Lions on February 15, 2018.

=== Edmonton Elks ===
The Elks announced the signing of Dubuisson on January 3, 2022. He re-signed with the Elks on July 4, 2023. He was released on July 16, 2023.
