= Daryl Waud =

Canadian football defensive lineman and lacrosse player

No. 93
- Position: Defensive lineman

Personal information
- Born: August 24, 1993 (age 33); Hamilton, Ontario, Canada
- Listed height: 6 ft 5 in (1.96 m)
- Listed weight: 290 lb (132 kg)

Career information
- University: Western
- CFL draft: 2015: 2nd round, 12th overall pick

Career history
- 2015–2017: Toronto Argonauts
- 2018: Ottawa Redblacks

Awards and highlights
- Grey Cup champion (2017)
- Stats at CFL.ca

Daryl Waud (born August 24, 1993) is a Canadian former professional football defensive lineman. He was drafted by the Toronto Argonauts in the second round, 12th overall, in the 2015 CFL draft and signed with the team on May 28, 2015. He played CIS football for the Western Mustangs. He later became a professional lacrosse player for the Philadelphia Wings of the National Lacrosse League.
