= Christian Covington =

Canadian American football player (born 1993)

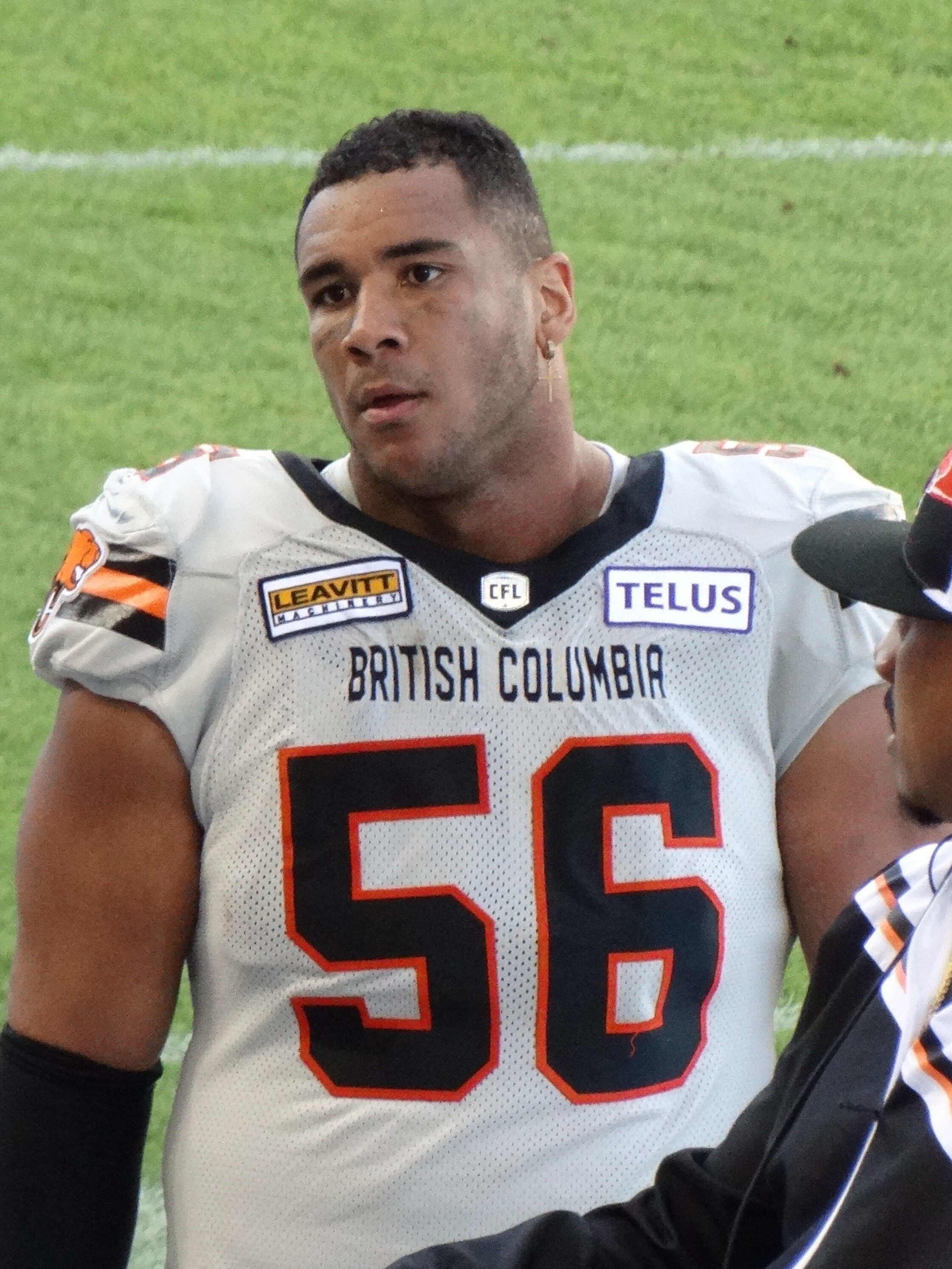
- Covington with the BC Lions in 2024

Profile
- Position: Defensive lineman

Personal information
- Born: October 16, 1993 (age 33); Vancouver, British Columbia, Canada
- Listed height: 6 ft 2 in (1.88 m)
- Listed weight: 305 lb (138 kg)

Career information
- High school: Vancouver (BC) College Prep
- College: Rice
- NFL draft: 2015: 6th round, 216th overall pick
- CFL draft: 2015: 5th round, 43rd overall pick

Career history
- Houston Texans (2015–2018); Dallas Cowboys (2019); Denver Broncos (2020)*; Cincinnati Bengals (2020); Los Angeles Chargers (2021–2022); Detroit Lions (2023)*; Los Angeles Chargers (2023)*; BC Lions (2024–2025)
- * Offseason or practice squad member only

Awards and highlights
- First-team All-C-USA (2013)

Career NFL statistics
- Total tackles: 196
- Sacks: 9.5
- Forced fumbles: 2
- Pass deflections: 2
- Stats at Pro Football Reference

Christian Coral Cleveland Covington (born October 16, 1993) is a Canadian professional football defensive lineman who is currently a free agent. He played college football at Rice and was selected by the Houston Texans in the sixth round of the 2015 NFL draft. He has also been a member of the Dallas Cowboys, Denver Broncos, Cincinnati Bengals, Los Angeles Chargers and Detroit Lions.

== Early life ==
Covington was born in Vancouver, British Columbia, and attended Vancouver College. As a senior, he contributed to the team winning the Provincial Championship, while tallying 83 tackles, 15 sacks, 6 fumble recoveries, one interception, 3 forced fumbles and 2 defensive touchdowns in 14 games.

He received Provincial Defensive MVP, first-team All-Canadian and Academic All-Canadian honors. He finished his prep career with 276 tackles and 38 sacks.

== College career ==
Covington accepted a football scholarship from Rice University. As a redshirt freshman in 2011, he appeared in 12 games at defensive tackle. He had 43 tackles (8 for loss), five sacks, 20 quarterback hurries, one pass breakup and one forced fumble.

As a sophomore in 2013, he was named the starting nose tackle and received first-team All–C-USA honors. He contributed to the school winning its first football conference title in 56 years. He suffered right thumb injury and was forced to play with a cast in the last 5 contests. He recorded 14 game appearances, 59 tackles (11.5 for loss), four sacks and one blocked field goal.

As a junior in 2014, he appeared in seven games, posting with 20 tackles (3.5 tackles for loss) and 2.5 sacks. He suffered a season ending dislocated kneecap in the eighth game against Florida International University. He had 7 tackles against Army. He made 5 tackles, 1.5 sacks and one pass breakup against North Texas.

He opted to declare for the 2015 NFL draft after the season. He finished his college career with 33 game appearances, 119 tackles (23 for loss), 11.5 sacks, 4 forced fumbles, 4 pass break ups and 2 blocked kicks.

== Professional career ==
Pre-draft measurables
Height	Weight	Arm length	Hand span	40-yard dash	10-yard split	20-yard split	20-yard shuttle	Three-cone drill	Vertical jump	Broad jump	Bench press
6 ft 2 3/8 in (1.89 m)	289 lb (131 kg)	33 1/4 in (0.84 m)	10 in (0.25 m)	4.90 s	1.68 s	2.79 s	4.43 s	7.43 s	30.5 in (0.77 m)	9 ft 3 in (2.82 m)	24 reps
All values from NFL Combine/Pro Day

=== Houston Texans ===
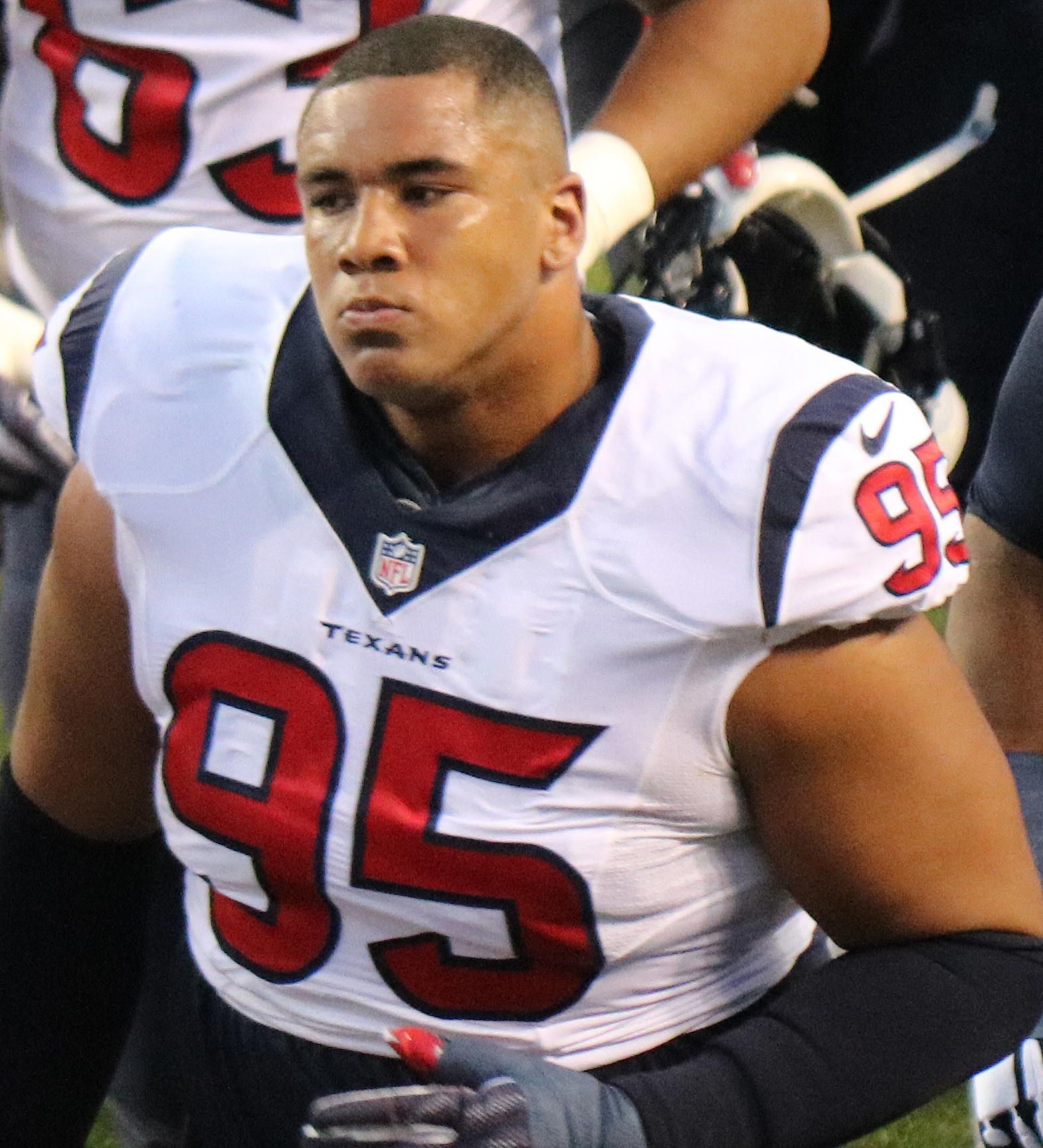
Covington with the Houston Texans in 2016

Covington was selected by the Houston Texans in the sixth round (216th overall) of the 2015 NFL draft. He was also selected by the BC Lions in the fifth round (43rd overall) of the 2015 CFL draft. As a rookie, he appeared in 15 games as backup defensive end in the team's 3-4 defense. He had 8 tackles (4 for loss) and 2 sacks.

In 2016, he appeared in 16 games with 5 starts as the left defensive end in the team's 3-4 defense. He tallied 26 tackles (2 for loss), one sack and one pass breakup. He had 5 tackles, one sack and one pass defensed in the season finale against the Tennessee Titans.

In 2017, he appeared in 7 games with 2 starts, registering 16 tackles, one sack and one forced fumble. In Week 8, Covington suffered a torn bicep against the Seattle Seahawks and was ruled out the rest of the season. He was placed on the injured reserve list on October 31. He had 3 tackles, one sack and one forced fumble against the New England Patriots.

In 2018, He started two out of 12 games, collecting 15 tackles (four for loss), 3.5 sacks and 8 quarterback pressures. He had four tackles (two for loss), 2.5 sacks and three quarterback hurries against the Titans.

=== Dallas Cowboys ===
On March 14, 2019, Covington signed a one-year deal with the Dallas Cowboys. He was a backup defensive tackle in the team's 4-3 defense. He appeared in 16 games with 6 starts in place of an injured Antwaun Woods, while registering 26 tackles (4 for loss), one sack, 15 quarterback pressures and one pass breakup.

=== Denver Broncos ===
On April 28, 2020, Covington signed a one-year, $1.75 million contract with the Denver Broncos.

=== Cincinnati Bengals ===
On September 4, 2020, Covington was traded to the Cincinnati Bengals, in exchange for linebacker Austin Calitro. He was expected to be the backup nose tackle behind D. J. Reader in the team's 3-4 defense. He played in all 16 games with 14 starts, finishing with a career-high 39 tackles.

=== Los Angeles Chargers (first stint) ===
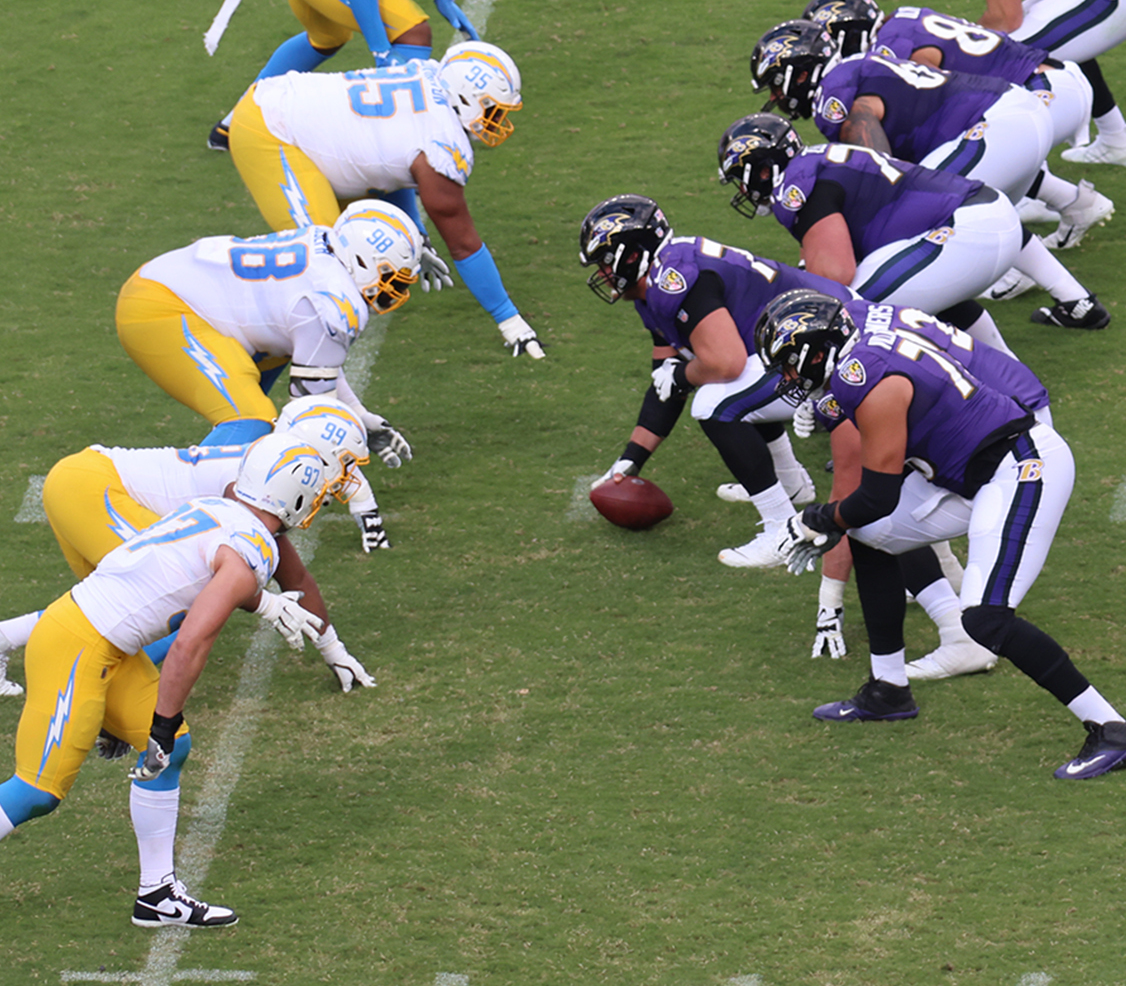
Covington (#95) playing against the Baltimore Ravens in 2021

Covington signed with the Los Angeles Chargers on May 11, 2021. He appeared in 16 games with 3 starts, collecting 52 tackles (3 for loss), one sack and one forced fumble.

On March 17, 2022, Covington re-signed with the Chargers. He was released on August 30, 2022, and signed to the practice squad the next day. He was promoted to the active roster on September 12. He was placed on injured reserve on November 16, 2022, with a torn pectoral muscle he suffered in the Week 10 game against the San Francisco 49ers. He appeared in 4 games, making 12 tackles (one for loss).

=== Detroit Lions ===
On May 10, 2023, Covington signed with the Detroit Lions. He was released on August 26, 2023.

=== Los Angeles Chargers (second stint) ===
On August 30, 2023, Covington was signed to the Chargers practice squad. His contract expired at the end of the season and he did not sign a reserve/future contract, thus becoming a free agent.

=== BC Lions ===
On May 1, 2024, it was announced that Covington had signed with the BC Lions. On September 4, 2025, Covington was placed on the Lions' 6-game injured list, where he spent the remainder of the 2025 CFL season. On May 8, 2026, Covington was released by the Lions.

== NFL career statistics ==
Legend
**Bold**	Career high

=== Regular season ===
Year	Team	Games		Tackles					Interceptions					Fumbles			
Year	Team	GP	GS	Cmb	Solo	Ast	Sck	TFL	Int	Yds	TD	Lng	PD	FF	FR	Yds	TD
2015	HOU	15	0	8	5	3	2.0	**4**	0	0	0	0	0	0	0	0	0
2016	HOU	**16**	5	26	16	10	1.0	2	0	0	0	0	**1**	0	0	0	0
2017	HOU	7	2	16	10	6	1.0	1	0	0	0	0	0	**1**	0	0	0
2018	HOU	12	2	15	8	7	**3.5**	**4**	0	0	0	0	0	0	0	0	0
2019	DAL	**16**	6	28	20	8	1.0	**4**	0	0	0	0	**1**	0	0	0	0
2020	CIN	**16**	**14**	39	14	**25**	0.0	0	0	0	0	0	0	0	0	0	0
2021	LAC	**16**	3	**52**	**30**	22	1.0	3	0	0	0	0	0	**1**	0	0	0
2022	LAC	4	0	12	3	9	0.0	1	0	0	0	0	0	0	0	0	0
		102	32	196	106	90	9.5	19	0	0	0	0	2	2	0	0	0

=== Playoffs ===
Year	Team	Games		Tackles					Interceptions					Fumbles			
Year	Team	GP	GS	Cmb	Solo	Ast	Sck	TFL	Int	Yds	TD	Lng	PD	FF	FR	Yds	TD
2015	HOU	1	0	**2**	0	**2**	0.0	0	0	0	0	0	0	0	0	0	0
2016	HOU	**2**	0	**2**	**1**	1	0.0	0	0	0	0	0	0	0	0	0	0
2018	HOU	1	0	0	0	0	0.0	0	0	0	0	0	0	0	0	0	0
		4	0	4	1	3	0.0	0	0	0	0	0	0	0	0	0	0

== Personal life ==
His father, Grover Covington is the Canadian Football League (CFL) all-time sacks leader (157) and is a member of the Canadian Football Hall of Fame.
