= Sean McEwen =

Canadian gridiron football player (born 1993)

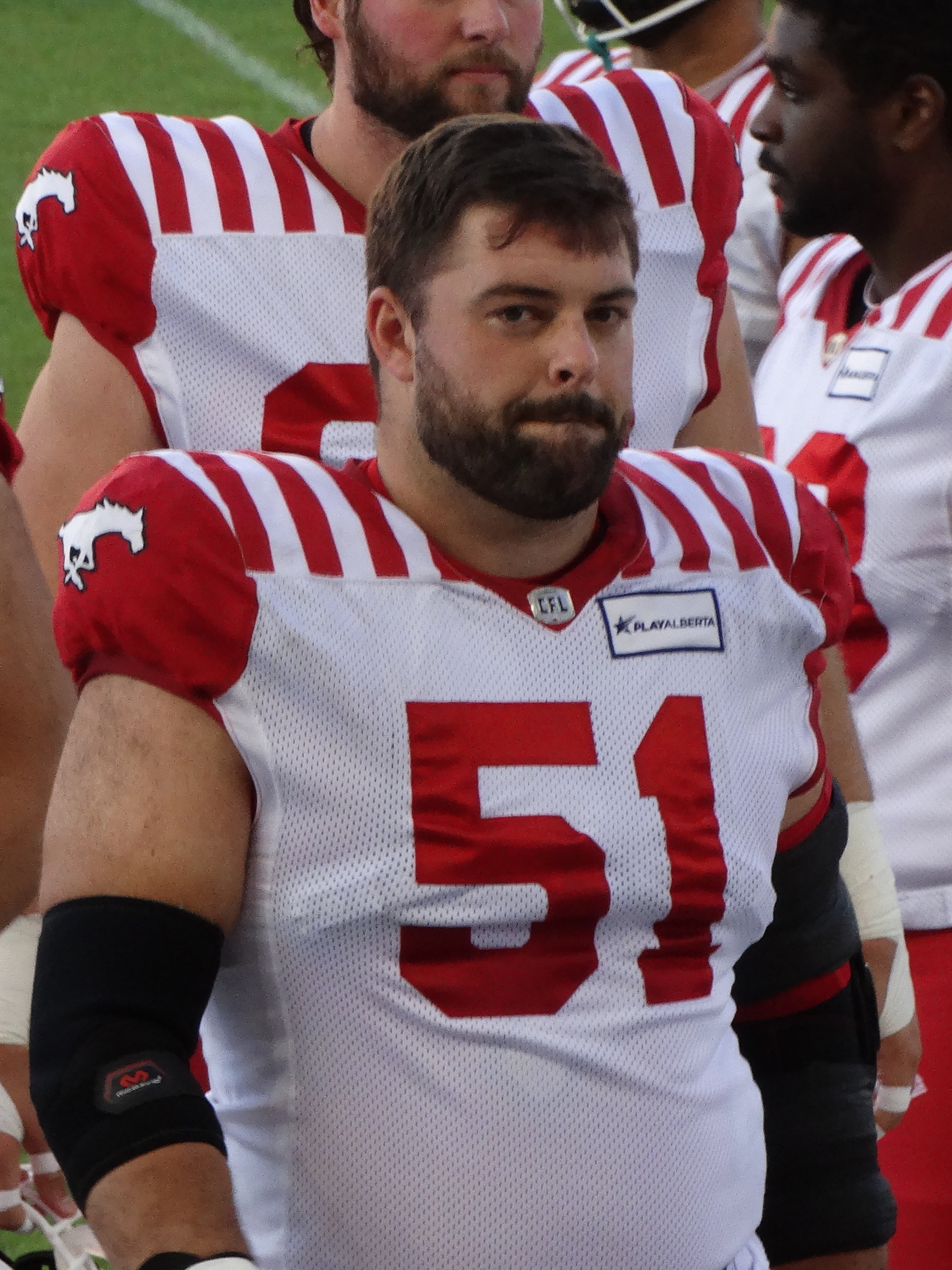
- McEwen with the Calgary Stampeders in 2024

Ottawa Redblacks
- Position: Offensive lineman
- CFL status: National

Personal information
- Born: June 27, 1993 (age 33); Calgary, Alberta, Canada
- Listed height: 6 ft 3 in (1.91 m)
- Listed weight: 295 lb (134 kg)

Career information
- University: Calgary
- CFL draft: 2015: 1st round, 3rd overall pick

Career history
- 2016–2019: Toronto Argonauts
- 2020–2024: Calgary Stampeders
- 2025: Saskatchewan Roughriders
- 2026–present: Ottawa Redblacks

Awards and highlights
- Grey Cup champion (2025); Leo Dandurand Trophy (2017); 3× CFL All-Star (2017, 2021, 2022); CFL East All-Star (2017); 3× CFL West All-Star (2021, 2022, 2023)
- Stats at CFL.ca

Sean McEwen (born June 27, 1993) is a Canadian professional football offensive lineman for the Ottawa Redblacks of the Canadian Football League (CFL).

== University career ==
McEwen played CIS football for the Calgary Dinos.

== Professional career ==
Pre-draft measurables
Height	Weight	Arm length	Hand span	Wingspan
6 ft 2 5/8 in (1.90 m)	299 lb (136 kg)	30 3/4 in (0.78 m)	9 3/8 in (0.24 m)	6 ft 4 3/8 in (1.94 m)
All values from Pro Day

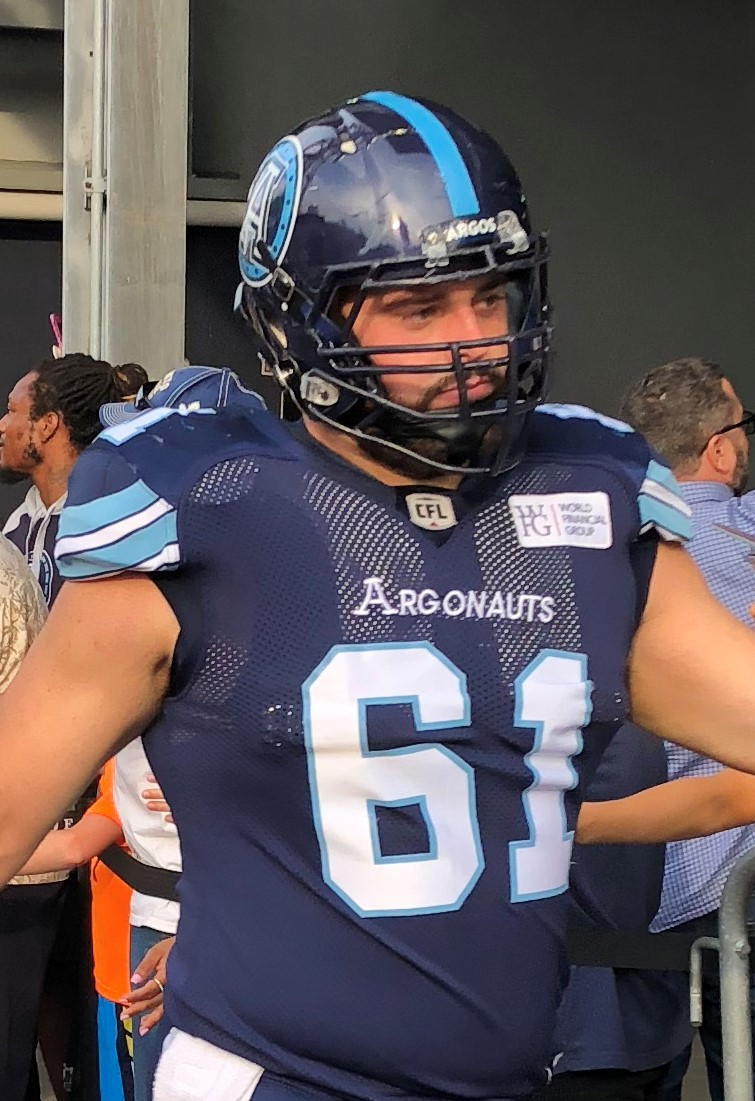
McEwen with the Toronto Argonauts in 2018

=== Toronto Argonauts ===
McEwen was drafted by the Toronto Argonauts third overall in the first round of the 2015 CFL draft after being ranked as the tenth best overall player available by the CFL Central Scouting Bureau. Shortly after the draft, he attended mini-camp with the National Football League's New York Giants, but was not signed by the team and he returned to the University of Calgary for his final year.

On May 13, 2016, it was announced that McEwen had agreed to a three-year contract with the Argonauts. He appeared in 16 games during the 2016 season, starting in 11, en route to being named the Argonauts nominee for Most Outstanding Rookie. On March 9, 2017, it was announced that McEwen had signed an extension through the 2019 season. At the end of that year, he was named a CFL All-Star at centre.

In 2019, he was the Toronto Argonauts' Most Outstanding Offensive Lineman. Over four seasons, he had played in all 72 regular season games as well as two post-season games, including a win in 105th Grey Cup game. As a pending free agent in 2020, he was released during the free agency negotiation window on February 7, 2020.

=== Calgary Stampeders ===
On February 8, 2020, it was announced that McEwen had signed a two-year contract with his hometown Calgary Stampeders. However, he did not play in 2020 due to the cancellation of the 2020 CFL season. He returned in 2021 where he played and started all 14 regular season games in a shortened season. He was named a CFL All-Star for the second time in his career that season.

In 2022, McEwen played and started in 12 regular season games, missing six due to injury. Nevertheless, he was named a CFL All-Star for the second consecutive year. In the 2023 season, he played and started in 17 regular season games and was named a West Division All-Star. He again played in 17 games in 2024. He became a free agent upon the expiry of his contract on February 11, 2025.

=== Saskatchewan Roughriders ===
On February 12, 2025, it was announced that McEwen had signed a contract with the Saskatchewan Roughriders.

=== Ottawa Redblacks ===
On May 4, 2026, McEwen signed with the Ottawa Redblacks.
