= Ryan Bomben =

Canadian football player (born 1987)

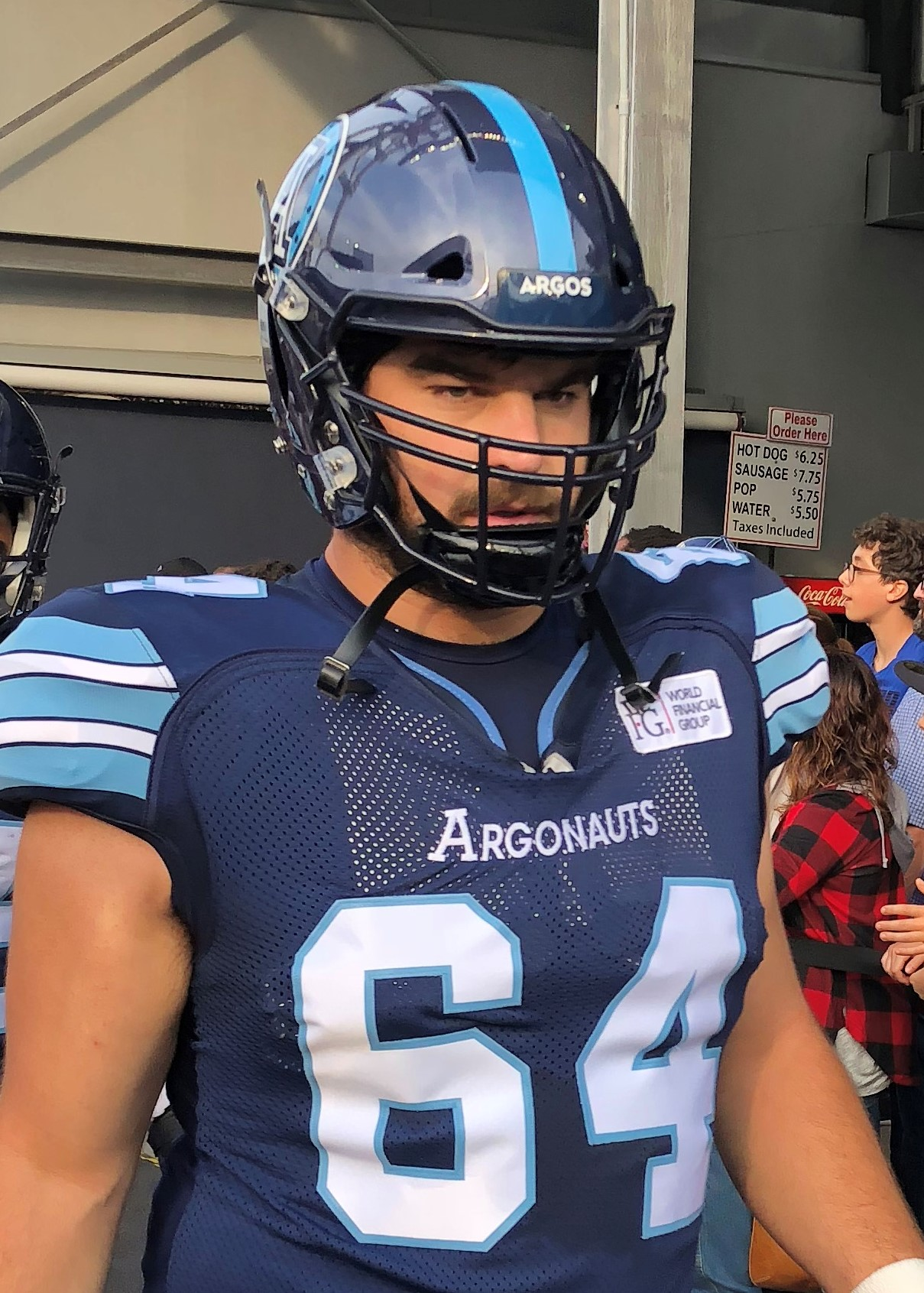
- Bomben before a Toronto Argonauts game in 2018

No. 64
- Position: Guard

Personal information
- Born: May 16, 1987 (age 39); Burlington, Ontario, Canada
- Listed height: 6 ft 5 in (1.96 m)
- Listed weight: 295 lb (134 kg)

Career information
- College: Guelph
- CFL draft: 2010: 4th round, 31st overall pick

Career history
- 2010–2014: Montreal Alouettes
- 2015–2017: Hamilton Tiger-Cats
- 2018: Montreal Alouettes
- 2018–2019: Toronto Argonauts

Awards and highlights
- 4× CFL East All-Star (2015, 2016, 2017, 2018)
- Stats at CFL.ca

Ryan Bomben (born May 16, 1987) is a Canadian former professional football offensive guard who played in the Canadian Football League (CFL) for the Montreal Alouettes, Hamilton Tiger-Cats, and Toronto Argonauts. He was a four-time East Division All-Star. Bomben played CIS football for the Guelph Gryphons.

== Professional career ==
He was originally drafted 31st overall by the Montreal Alouettes in the 2010 CFL draft. In 2011 and 2012 with the Alouettes, he dressed in all 36 games as a back-up offensive lineman. He scored his first professional touchdown on October 28, 2012, on a five-yard reception and record five receptions for 33 yards in 2012 as a tight end. In 2013, he became a regular starter at offensive guard, starting 15 regular season games while dressing in all 18. He started all 18 regular season games in 2014 as well as starting both playoff games that year.

Bomben was obtained by the Hamilton Tiger-Cats prior to the start of the 2015 CFL draft, in exchange for their first-round pick (eighth overall, used to select Jacob Ruby, OL, Richmond) and third-round pick (24th overall, used to select James Bodanis, OL, Michigan State). He played in 12 games for the Tiger-Cats in 2015, starting in 11 at right guard, before suffering a season-ending injury on October 23, 2015, against the BC Lions. He had signed a three-year contract extension with Hamilton on October 15, 2015. He was named an East Division All-Star that year which was the first of his career. He continued his strong play in 2016, starting all 18 regular season games at right guard while being named the Tiger-Cats' Most Outstanding Offensive Lineman and another East Division All-Star award. In 2017, he once again started all 18 regular season games and was named an East Division All-Star.

On May 2, 2018, he was traded along with Hamilton's second overall selection in the 2018 CFL draft, wide receiver Jamal Robinson, a fourth round pick (34th overall) in 2018, a seventh round pick (56th overall) in 2018, and rights to an undisclosed negotiation list player, for Montreal's first overall pick in 2018, a fourth round pick (31st overall) in 2018, a sixth round pick (44th overall) in 2018, and a second round pick (would become 10th overall) in 2019. He played and started in six games for the Alouettes in his return to Montreal. However, the reunion was short-lived as the Alouettes traded Bomben and a 2020 fifth-round pick to the Toronto Argonauts in exchange for T.J. Heath and a 2020 third-round pick on July 29, 2018. He dressed in 12 games for the Argonauts, starting 11, and was once again named an East Division All-Star for his combined play with the Alouettes and Argonauts. He played in 17 regular season games in 2019 and started 13 at right guard. He was released by the Argonauts on February 3, 2020.
