= Lemar Durant =

Canadian football player (born 1992)

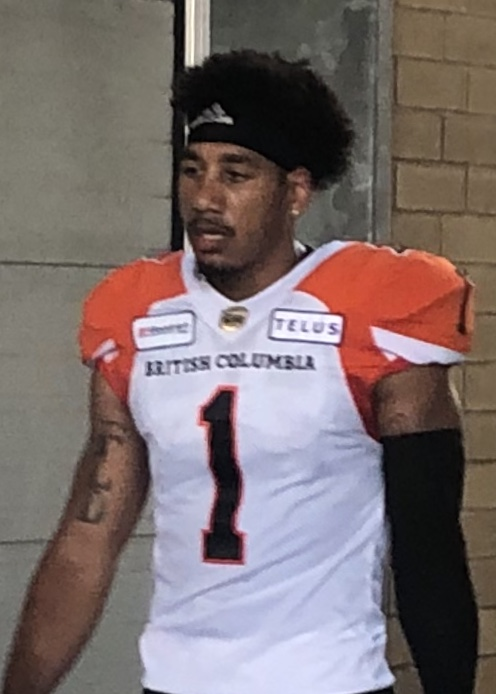
- Durant with the BC Lions in 2019

No. 1
- Position: Wide receiver

Personal information
- Born: August 20, 1992 (age 34); Vancouver, British Columbia, Canada
- Listed height: 6 ft 2 in (1.88 m)
- Listed weight: 231 lb (105 kg)

Career information
- High school: Centennial Secondary
- College: Simon Fraser; Nevada
- CFL draft: 2015: 2nd round, 18th overall pick

Career history
- 2015–2018: Calgary Stampeders
- 2019–2021: BC Lions
- 2022: Hamilton Tiger-Cats
- 2023: Ottawa Redblacks*
- * Offseason or practice squad member only
- Stats at CFL.ca

Lemar Durant (born August 20, 1992) is a Canadian-American former professional football wide receiver who played seven seasons in the Canadian Football League (CFL). He attended Simon Fraser University, where he played college football for the Simon Fraser Clan. He was drafted by the Calgary Stampeders in the second round of the 2015 CFL draft. Durant was also a member of the BC Lions and Hamilton Tiger-Cats, and Ottawa Redblacks.

== Early career ==
Durant played high school football at Centennial Secondary School. During his senior year, as his team's top receiver, Durant was asked to switch to the quarterback position to fill in for the team's quarterback, who had suffered a season ending injury. Over seven games that year, he completed seven touchdown passes and ran for 985 yards and an additional 16 touchdowns. For his performance as a senior, Durant was named the Coquitlam Sports Wall of Fame’s male high school athlete of the year in 2009. He was also awarded the Canadian High School football Provincial MVP for his performance on the field that same year. A dual sport athlete, Durant also played basketball at Centennial, averaging 32 points per game.

After graduating from high school in 2010, Durant, who is a dual USA/Canadian citizen attended the University of Nevada, Reno where he played for the Wolf Pack as a wide receiver. He transferred to Simon Fraser University, where he played from 2012 to 2014. Durant recorded 175 receptions for 2,392 yards and 28 touchdowns during his time with the SFU Clan. In October 2012, Durant tied the Great Northwest Athletic Conference single-game record for receiving touchdowns after catching 12 passes for 228 yards and four touchdowns against the Dixie State Red Storm. He finished his first year at Simon Fraser with 17 touchdowns and a conference record 93 catches, for which he was named a first-team conference all-star. Durant was again named an all-star in his final year after recording 55 catches for 685 yards and four touchdowns.

== Professional career ==
=== Calgary Stampeders ===
Durant attended the CFL Combine and posted a 4.55 second 40-yard dash, 36-inch vertical jump, and 26 bench press reps. He declared eligibility for the 2015 NFL draft.. Both the Seattle Seahawks and the New York Giants offered him tryouts, but he was eventually signed by the Calgary Stampeders. The CFL Scouting Bureau ranked Durant eighth among the draft class in their final rankings. Durant was selected in the second round of the 2015 CFL draft by the Calgary Stampeders with the 18th overall pick. After recording 85 yards on five catches in the final pre-season game, Durant remained on the team into the regular season. Durant made his CFL debut on July 18, 2015 against the Winnipeg Blue Bombers, catching one pass for 19 yards. He played in 13 games during the 2015 season, catching 12 passes for 170 yards and three touchdowns. He played in 15 games in 2016, catching 35 passes for 402 yards and one touchdown. In 2018, the Stampeders won the 106th Grey Cup over the Ottawa Redblacks 27–16 where Durant was awarded the Grey Cup's Most Valuable Canadian after recording four receptions for 30 yards and one touchdown and 22 yards rushing. With his contract expiring in the 2019 offseason, Durant finished his Stampeder career having played in 51 games, recording 102 receptions for 1280 yards and eight touchdowns.

=== BC Lions ===
On February 12, 2019, Durant signed with his hometown BC Lions. His first year in BC proved to be a breakout season as Durant set career highs in receptions (57), yards (810) and touchdowns (5) in only 15 games for the Lions. His season was cut short due to a foot injury he sustained in Week 17 of the season. Nevertheless, Durant was the team selection for Leo's Most Outstanding Canadian award. He signed a contract extension with the Lions through the 2022 season on December 21, 2020. He played in just eight games in 2021, due to injuries and a shortened season, where he had 24 receptions for 243 yards and no touchdowns. Durant was reportedly set to earn $200,000 in 2022 with the Lions and was released on January 21, 2022.

=== Hamilton Tiger-Cats ===
On January 31, 2022, it was announced that Durant had signed with the Hamilton Tiger-Cats. Durant was placed on the six-game injured reserve to start the 2022 season. He ended up missing seven games in 2022, playing in 11 matches and catching only 12 passes for 112 yards with one touchdown. Following the season he was not re-signed by the Ti-Cats and became a free agent on February 14, 2023.

=== Ottawa Redblacks ===
On February 17, 2023 Durant signed a one-year contract with the Ottawa Redblacks. On May 11, 2023, the Redblacks announced that Durant had retired from professional football.

Durant finished his career having played seven seasons for three different teams. He played in 85 regular season games and caught 195 passes for 2,465 yards with 14 touchdowns.

== Personal life ==
Durant was born to Frank and Rebecca Durant and grew up in Coquitlam.
