= Alex Mateas =

Canadian football player (born 1991)

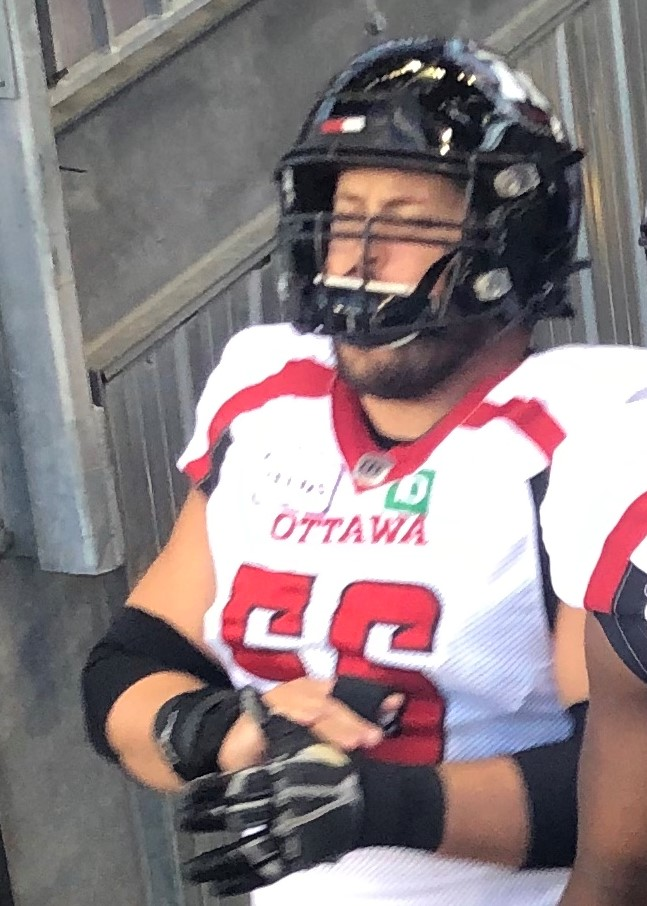
- Mateas with the Ottawa Redblacks in 2019

No. 56
- Position: Offensive lineman

Personal information
- Born: March 28, 1991 (age 35); Ottawa, Ontario, Canada
- Listed height: 6 ft 4 in (1.93 m)
- Listed weight: 309 lb (140 kg)

Career information
- High school: Merivale High School
- CJFL: Ottawa Sooners
- College: Connecticut
- CFL draft: 2015: 1st round, 1st overall pick

Career history
- 2015–2020: Ottawa Redblacks

Awards and highlights
- Grey Cup champion (2016); 2× CFL East All-Star (2017, 2018)
- Stats at CFL.ca

Alex Peter Traian Mateas (born March 28, 1991) is a Canadian former professional football offensive lineman who played for five seasons for the Ottawa Redblacks of the Canadian Football League (CFL). He was drafted by the Redblacks with the first overall pick in the 2015 CFL draft. He won a Grey Cup championship with the Redblacks in 2016. He announced his retirement on July 5, 2021.

Mateas played college football at the University of Connecticut from 2012 to 2014 after redshirting at Penn State University in 2010. His father, Traian Mateaş is a retired soccer player and current youth coach at Ottawa TFC.
