= Rory Connop =

Canadian football player (born 1990)

No. 95
- Position: Defensive lineman

Personal information
- Born: December 27, 1990 (age 35); Edmonton, Alberta, Canada
- Listed height: 6 ft 5 in (1.96 m)
- Listed weight: 282 lb (128 kg)

Career information
- High school: Edmonton (AB) St. Francis Xavier
- University: Western
- CFL draft: 2015: 3rd round, 26th overall pick

Career history
- 2015: Saskatchewan Roughriders
- Stats at CFL.ca

Rory Connop (born December 27, 1990) is a Canadian former professional football defensive lineman who played for the Saskatchewan Roughriders of the Canadian Football League (CFL). He previously attended Western University and played college football for the Western Ontario Mustangs. He also played junior football for the Edmonton Wildcats of the Canadian Junior Football League (CJFL).

== Early career ==
Connop attended St. Francis Xavier High School but did not play high school football there. Instead, he played community football with the West Edmonton Raiders. He went on to play three years with the Edmonton Wildcats of the CJFL and was named an all-star of the Prairie Football Conference twice. In 2011, he enrolled at Boise State University and maintained redshirt status on the Broncos. Following his one year at Boise State, Connop discovered the NCAA would only allow him two years of eligibility, causing him to leave the Broncos for the Western Mustangs. In 16 regular season games with the Mustangs, Connop recorded 32 tackles and six quarterback sacks. He also played in seven playoff games with 16 total tackles and two sacks. Connop was invited to play in the 2014 East West Bowl.

== Professional career ==
Connop was selected in the third round of the 2015 CFL draft by the Saskatchewan Roughriders with the 26th overall pick. He made his CFL debut and started in the season debut against the Winnipeg Blue Bombers on June 27. Connop recorded his first tackle in the Week 2 game against the BC Lions. He retired in May 2016.

== Personal life ==
Rory Connop is the son of former Edmonton Eskimos offensive lineman and Canadian Football Hall of Fame member Rod Connop. Connop grew up playing hockey and played three seasons in the Alberta Junior Hockey League.
