= Tevaughn Campbell =

Canadian football and rugby player (born 1993)

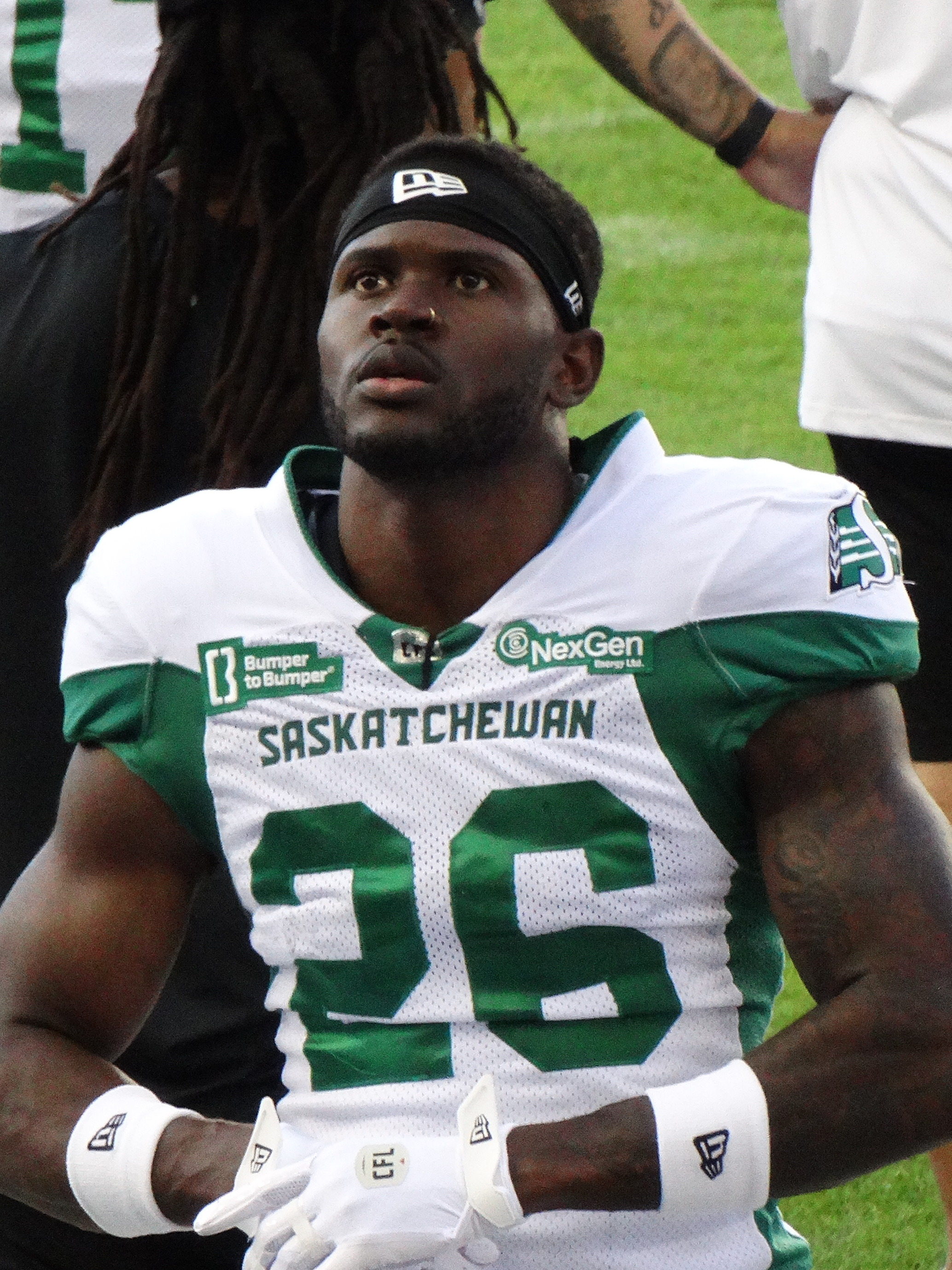
- Campbell with the Saskatchewan Roughriders in 2025

No. 26 – Saskatchewan Roughriders
- Position: Defensive back
- Roster status: 6-game injured list
- CFL status: National

Personal information
- Born: June 14, 1993 (age 33); Scarborough, Ontario, Canada
- Listed height: 6 ft 0 in (1.83 m)
- Listed weight: 195 lb (88 kg)

Career information
- High school: Laurier (Toronto, Ontario)
- University: Regina (2011–2014)
- NFL draft: 2015: undrafted
- CFL draft: 2015: 3rd round, 22nd overall pick

Career history
- Calgary Stampeders (2015); Saskatchewan Roughriders (2016–2017); Montreal Alouettes (2017–2018); New York Jets (2019)*; Los Angeles Chargers (2019–2022); Las Vegas Raiders (2022)*; Jacksonville Jaguars (2022–2024); Saskatchewan Roughriders (2025–present)
- * Offseason or practice squad member only

Awards and highlights
- Grey Cup champion (2025); CFL All-Star (2025); CFL West All-Star (2025)

Career NFL statistics
- GP–GS: 37–11
- Total tackles: 65
- Forced fumbles: 3
- Fumble recoveries: 1
- Pass deflections: 7
- Interceptions: 1
- Defensive touchdowns: 2
- Stats at Pro Football Reference

Career CFL statistics as of 2025
- GP–GS: 55–37
- Def tackles: 71
- ST tackles: 10
- Pass knockdowns: 23
- Interceptions: 10
- Quarterback sacks: 1
- Forced fumbles: 2
- Fumble recoveries: 4
- Touchdowns: 4
- Stats at CFL.ca

Other information

Rugby union career
National sevens team
Years	Team	Comps
2016–17	Canada Sevens	2

Tevaughn Shaquele Campbell (born June 14, 1993) is a Canadian professional football defensive back for the Saskatchewan Roughriders of the Canadian Football League (CFL). He played CIS football for the Regina Rams. He played four seasons in the CFL before moving to the United States to play in the National Football League (NFL).

== University career ==
Campbell played CIS football for the Regina Rams from 2011 to 2014.

== Professional football career ==
=== Canadian Football League ===
Campbell was originally drafted by the Calgary Stampeders in the third round, 22nd overall, in the 2015 CFL draft. After playing in five games in 2015 with the Stampeders, Campbell was traded to the Saskatchewan Roughriders on February 11, 2016, in exchange for a fourth-round pick in the 2017 CFL draft.

On August 15, 2017, Campbell, along with the Roughriders' third round picks in the 2018 CFL draft and 2019 CFL draft, was traded to the Montreal Alouettes for Vernon Adams and a fifth round pick in the 2018 CFL Draft.

=== New York Jets ===
On January 4, 2019, Campbell signed a reserve/future contract with the New York Jets of the NFL. He was waived on August 31, 2019.

=== Los Angeles Chargers ===
On September 11, 2019, Campbell was signed to the Los Angeles Chargers practice squad. He was promoted to the active roster on October 29, 2019, but was waived four days later and re-signed to the practice squad. He was promoted back to the active roster on November 25, 2019. He was waived on December 9, 2019, and re-signed to the practice squad. He signed a futures contract with the Chargers on December 30, 2019.

In Week 11 against his former team, the Jets, Campbell intercepted a pass thrown by Joe Flacco and returned it for a six yard touchdown during the 34–28 win. This was Campbell's first NFL interception and touchdown.

On August 23, 2022, Campbell was released by the Chargers. He was placed on injured reserve two days later. He was released on September 13.

=== Las Vegas Raiders ===
On October 17, 2022, Campbell was signed to the Las Vegas Raiders practice squad.

=== Jacksonville Jaguars ===
On October 26, 2022, Campbell was signed by the Jacksonville Jaguars off the Raiders' practice squad. He re-signed with the Jaguars on March 16, 2023. He was released on August 29, 2023, and re-signed to the practice squad. He signed a reserve/future contract on January 8, 2024.

On August 25, 2024, Campbell was released by the Jaguars.

=== Saskatchewan Roughriders ===
On February 3, 2025, it was announced that Campbell had signed with the Saskatchewan Roughriders. In his return to the CFL, he earned a starting spot at cornerback. He played and started in 13 regular season games while missing five due to injury. In the Labour Day Classic against the Winnipeg Blue Bombers, with less than one minute remaining, Campbell intercepted a two-point convert attempt that would have tied the game that he returned for two points to secure the 34–30 victory. At the end of the season, he finished tied for the league lead in interceptions with six and also led the league in interception return yards with 205, which was the second-most in Roughrider history, and had an interception return for a touchdown. He recorded 18 defensive tackles, one special teams tackle, four pass knockdowns, and one fumble recovery. For his outstanding season, he was named a West Division All-Star and a CFL All-Star for the first time in his career. In his first playoff game, in the West Final against the BC Lions, he recorded two defensive tackles in the 24–21 victory to qualify for his first Grey Cup appearance. In the 112th Grey Cup game, Campbell recorded three defensive tackles, one interception, and forced a crucial fumble at the goal line to help the Roughriders beat the Montreal Alouettes 25-17.

The Roughriders extended Campbell's contract with the team on January 12, 2026. On August 6, he was placed on the 6-game injured list.

== Rugby career ==
Campbell trained with the Canada national rugby sevens team during the 2016-17 World Rugby Sevens Series stops in Hong Kong and Singapore.
