= Tyler Varga =

Finnish-Canadian American football player (born 1993)

No. 38
- Position: Fullback

Personal information
- Born: September 24, 1993 (age 33); Stockholm, Sweden
- Listed height: 6 ft 0 in (1.83 m)
- Listed weight: 222 lb (101 kg)

Career information
- High school: Cameron Heights (Kitchener, Ontario, Canada)
- College: Yale (2012–2014)
- University: Western Ontario (2011)
- NFL draft: 2015: undrafted
- CFL draft: 2015: 3rd round, 19th overall pick

Career history
- Indianapolis Colts (2015)

Awards and highlights
- Bushnell Cup (2014); Nils V. "Swede" Nelson Award (2014); 2× First-team All-Ivy (2012, 2014); Peter Gorman Trophy (2011)

Career NFL statistics
- Rushing yards: 2
- Rushing average: 2.0
- Rushing touchdowns: 0
- Receiving yards: 18
- Receiving average: 18.0
- Receiving touchdowns: 0
- Stats at Pro Football Reference

John Tyler Varga (born September 24, 1993) is a Finnish-Canadian-Swedish-Croatian former professional American football fullback. Varga played college football at the University of Western Ontario, where he was named the OUA Rookie of the Year in 2011, and Yale. He was signed by the Indianapolis Colts of the National Football League (NFL), where he spent one season, and is the first Finnish player to play in NFL.

== Early life ==
Varga was born in Stockholm, Sweden. His mother Hannele Sundberg is originally from Vantaa, Finland, and his father John Varga is of Croatian descent.

== College career ==
Varga attended the University of Western Ontario for one season in 2011, where he was named team MVP, conference player of the year and Canadian Interuniversity Sport (CIS) National Freshman of the Year.

Before the 2012 season, Varga transferred to Yale University, where he played for the rest of his college career. He finished at Yale as a three-time All-Ivy honoree with 529 rushing attempts (ranked 5th in Yale history), 2,985 rushing yards (ranked 4th), 5.6 yards per carry (ranked 2nd), and 31 rushing touchdowns (ranked 3rd). Following Varga's senior performance, he was honored as the 2014 Offensive Player of the Year and awarded the Asa S. Bushnell Cup, which honours the Ivy League Player of the Year. Varga was the eighth Bulldog to receive the Cup in Yale's ninth recognition, its first since 2007. He graduated in 2015 with a degree in ecology and evolutionary biology.

== Professional career ==
In May 2015, after going unselected in the 2015 NFL draft, Varga signed as an undrafted free agent with the Indianapolis Colts. In a preseason game against the St. Louis Rams, Varga scored a 1-yard rushing touchdown. He made his NFL regular season debut in Week 1 against the Buffalo Bills. The following week against the New York Jets, Varga made 4 kick returns for 98 yards. In Week 3 against the Tennessee Titans, Varga suffered a concussion in the Colts' win. On October 14, he was placed season-ending injured reserve. On July 26, 2016, Varga retired from the NFL.

=== Statistics ===
Year	Team	Games		Rushing					Receiving					Fumbles	
Year	Team	GP	GS	Att	Yds	Avg	Lng	TD	Rec	Yds	Avg	Lng	TD	FUM	Lost
2015	Indianapolis Colts	3	0	1	2	2.0	2	0	1	18	18.0	18	0	–	–
	Total	3	0	1	2	2.0	2	0	1	18	18.0	18	0	0	0
