= Danny Groulx (Canadian football) =

Canadian football player (born 1990)

No. 50
- Position: Offensive lineman

Personal information
- Born: March 27, 1990 (age 36); Gatineau, Quebec, Canada
- Listed height: 6 ft 6 in (1.98 m)
- Listed weight: 325 lb (147 kg)

Career information
- High school: École secondaire de la Montée
- University: Laval
- CFL draft: 2015: 1st round, 7th overall pick

Career history
- 2015–2017: Edmonton Eskimos

Awards and highlights
- Grey Cup champion (2015)
- Stats at CFL.ca

Danny Groulx (born March 27, 1990) is a Canadian former professional football offensive lineman who played for the Edmonton Eskimos of the Canadian Football League (CFL). He attended Laval University, where he played CIS football for the Laval Rouge et Or.

== Early life ==
Groulx played hockey from 7 to 14 years before changing to football. He played high school football at École secondaire de la Montée and played for the cougars of the Champlain College Lennoxville. From 2010 to 2014, Groulx played for the Laval Rouge et Or. He was on the 2012 and 2013 Rouge et Or teams that won the Vanier Cup. In his senior year, Groulx played in only four games, playing three at left tackle and one at right tackle. He missed multiple games due to an ankle injury. Despite this, he played in the 2014 East-West Bowl on Team East.

== Professional career ==
Groulx attended National Football League (NFL) regional and superregional combines and was eligible for the 2015 NFL draft, but went undrafted. Groulx attended a rookie mini-camp with the New York Giants of the NFL. He also attended the national CFL Combine in Toronto. He was among the top draft prospects in the CFL for 2015, being ranked 4th in September, 8th in December, and 5th in the final rankings by the CFL Scouting Bureau. Groulx was selected in the first round of the 2015 CFL draft by the Edmonton Eskimos with the 7th overall pick. The Eskimos signed him to a contract on May 28, and he remained on the active roster on the offensive line after the preseason. Groulx made his CFL debut in the season opener against the Toronto Argonauts on June 27, 2015. He played the first two games of his rookie season as a right guard and went on to play ten games that season. He was released on January 22, 2018.

== Animation career ==
After his final season as a football player, Groulx then made his debuts as an animator at Squeeze animation. He is currently a gameplay animator at Ubisoft. He also gives lectures at l'école NAD-UQAC.

== Personal life ==
In addition to football, Groulx is also fan of chess.
