= Chris Ackie =

Canadian football player (born 1992)

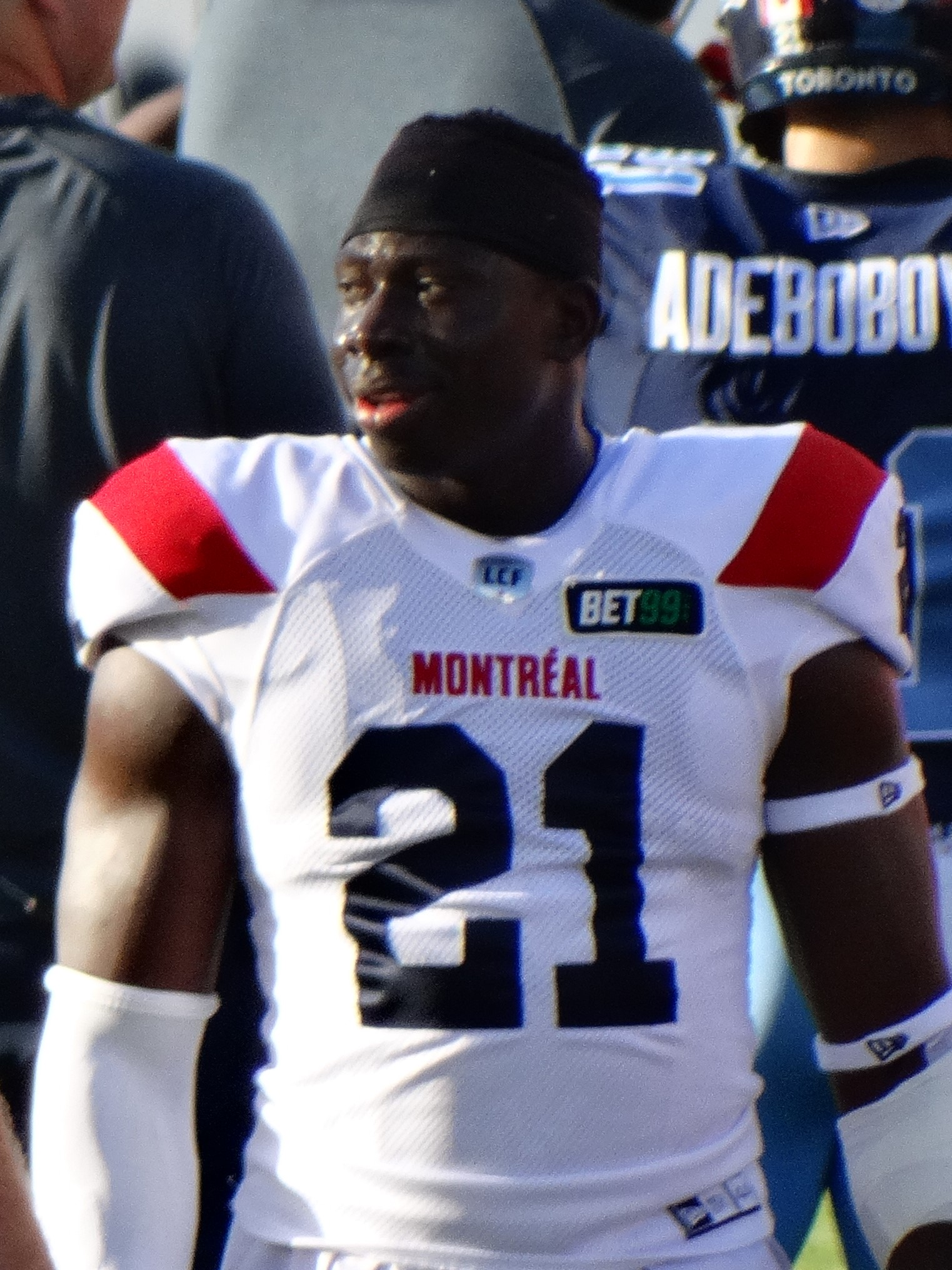
- Ackie with the Montreal Alouettes in 2022

No. 21
- Position: Linebacker

Personal information
- Born: January 26, 1992 (age 34); Cambridge, Ontario, Canada
- Listed height: 6 ft 2 in (1.88 m)
- Listed weight: 218 lb (99 kg)

Career information
- High school: Preston
- University: Wilfrid Laurier
- CFL draft: 2015: 1st round, 4th overall pick

Career history
- 2015: New York Giants*
- 2015–2018: Montreal Alouettes
- 2018: Ottawa Redblacks
- 2019: Montreal Alouettes
- 2020: Toronto Argonauts*
- 2021–2022: Montreal Alouettes
- * Offseason or practice squad member only
- Stats at CFL.ca

Chris Ackie (born January 26, 1992) is a Canadian former professional football linebacker. Ackie spent the majority of his professional career playing for the Montreal Alouettes Canadian Football League (CFL). He played CIS football for the Wilfrid Laurier Golden Hawks from 2011 to 2014. He was drafted fourth overall by the Montreal Alouettes in the 2015 CFL draft. Ackie was also a member of the New York Giants, Ottawa Redblacks and Toronto Argonauts.

== Professional career ==
=== New York Giants ===
Ackie tried out for the New York Giants at their rookie mini camp invite in 2015 but didn't catch on with them.

=== Montreal Alouettes ===
He was originally drafted 4th overall by the Montreal Alouettes in the 2015 CFL draft and signed with the team to a three-year contract on June 1, 2015. During his first two seasons with the Alouettes, Ackie played both outside linebacker positions and special teams. He was signed to one-year contract extension on January 15, 2018. Ackie played in 48 games for the Alouettes over four seasons, contributing 86 defensive tackles, 22 special teams tackles, four forced fumbles, one interception and one quarterback sack.

=== Ottawa Redblacks ===
On October 10, 2018, Ackie was traded just prior to the trade deadline to the Ottawa Redblacks in exchange for a second-round pick in the 2019 CFL draft. Ackie's contract expired on November 28, 2018 and he became a free agent.

=== Montreal Alouettes (II) ===
Ackie remained unsigned at the beginning of the 2019 CFL season and was reportedly waiting until injuries created a demand for his signing. After losing linebackers Boseko Lokombo and Glenn Love to injury, the Alouettes re-signed Ackie on July 8, 2019 to a one-year deal.

=== Toronto Argonauts ===
Upon entering free agency, Ackie signed with the Toronto Argonauts on February 12, 2020. However, the 2020 CFL season was cancelled and his contract expired on February 8, 2021.

=== Montreal Alouettes (III) ===
On February 9, 2021, it was announced that Ackie had signed with the Montreal Alouettes, his third tenure with the club. In his first season back in Montreal Ackie played in all 14 regular season games contributing with 48 defensive tackles, and two interceptions. He missed five games early in the 2022 season with an injured ankle, he was activated off the injured reserve list on August 1, 2022. In April 2023, Ackie announced his retirement on social media from professional football.

== Personal life ==
Ackie's cousin, Jordan Ackie is pursuing a lacrosse scholarship. Chris Ackie is a native of Cambridge, Ontario.
