= Nick Shortill =

Canadian gridiron football player (born 1992)

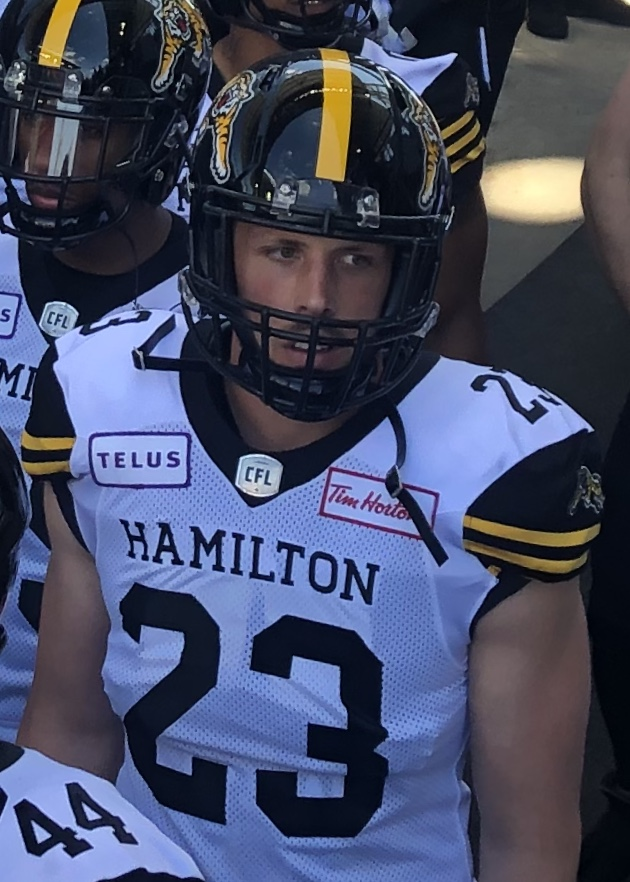
- Shortill with the Hamilton Tiger-Cats in 2019

Profile
- Position: Linebacker

Personal information
- Born: November 16, 1992 (age 33); Nobleton, Ontario, Canada
- Listed height: 6 ft 2 in (1.88 m)
- Listed weight: 227 lb (103 kg)

Career information
- University: McMaster
- CFL draft: 2015: 2nd round, 13th overall pick

Career history
- 2015–2016: Montreal Alouettes
- 2017–2019: Hamilton Tiger-Cats
- 2020–2021: Toronto Argonauts*
- * Offseason or practice squad member only
- Stats at CFL.ca

Nicholas Shortill (born November 16, 1992) is a Canadian former professional football linebacker who played in the Canadian Football League (CFL).

== Early life ==
He was raised in Nobleton, Ontario, and attended McMaster University where he played for four years for the McMaster Marauders football team.

== Professional career ==
Shortill was drafted by the Montreal Alouettes with the 13th pick in the 2015 CFL draft and played for the Alouettes in 35 games over two years. He was traded to the Hamilton Tiger-Cats where he spent three years with the team. Upon entering free agency, on February 11, 2020, Shortill signed with the Toronto Argonauts. He did not play in 2020 due to the cancellation of the 2020 CFL season. He was placed on the suspended list on July 10, 2021. He did not play in any games for the Argonauts and his contract expired on February 8, 2022.
