= Rod Connop =

Canadian football player (born 1959)

Profile
- Positions: Centre, Guard

Personal information
- Born: June 4, 1959 (age 67); North Vancouver, British Columbia, Canada
- Listed height: 6 ft 4 in (1.93 m)
- Listed weight: 265 lb (120 kg)

Career information
- University: Wilfrid Laurier
- CFL draft: 1982: 1st round, 9th overall pick

Career history
- 1982–1997: Edmonton Eskimos

Awards and highlights
- 3× Grey Cup champion (1982, 1987, 1993); CFL's Most Outstanding Offensive Lineman Award (1989); DeMarco-Becket Memorial Trophy (1989); 6× CFL West All-Star (1987, 1989–1993); 7× CFL West All-Star (1987, 1989–1993, 1996); Edmonton Eskimos Wall of Honour (2005); Eskimos record - most games played (274)
- Canadian Football Hall of Fame (Class of 2005)

Rod Connop (born June 4, 1959) is a Canadian former professional football player for the Edmonton Eskimos of the Canadian Football League (CFL). He spent his entire 16-year career with the Eskimos as an offensive lineman. Connop played CIS football at Wilfrid Laurier Golden Hawks. He was named CFL All-Star six times and won the CFL's Most Outstanding Offensive Lineman Award in the 1989 CFL season. Connop played 210 consecutive games with the Eskimos from 1982 until his retirement following the 1997 season. As of 2011, he continued to be the all-time Eskimo leader in games played (274). He is a member of the Canadian Football Hall of Fame, where he was inducted in 2005. His son Rory Connop played for the Saskatchewan Roughriders of the CFL as a defensive lineman.
