= Jacob Ruby =

Canadian gridiron football player (born 1992)

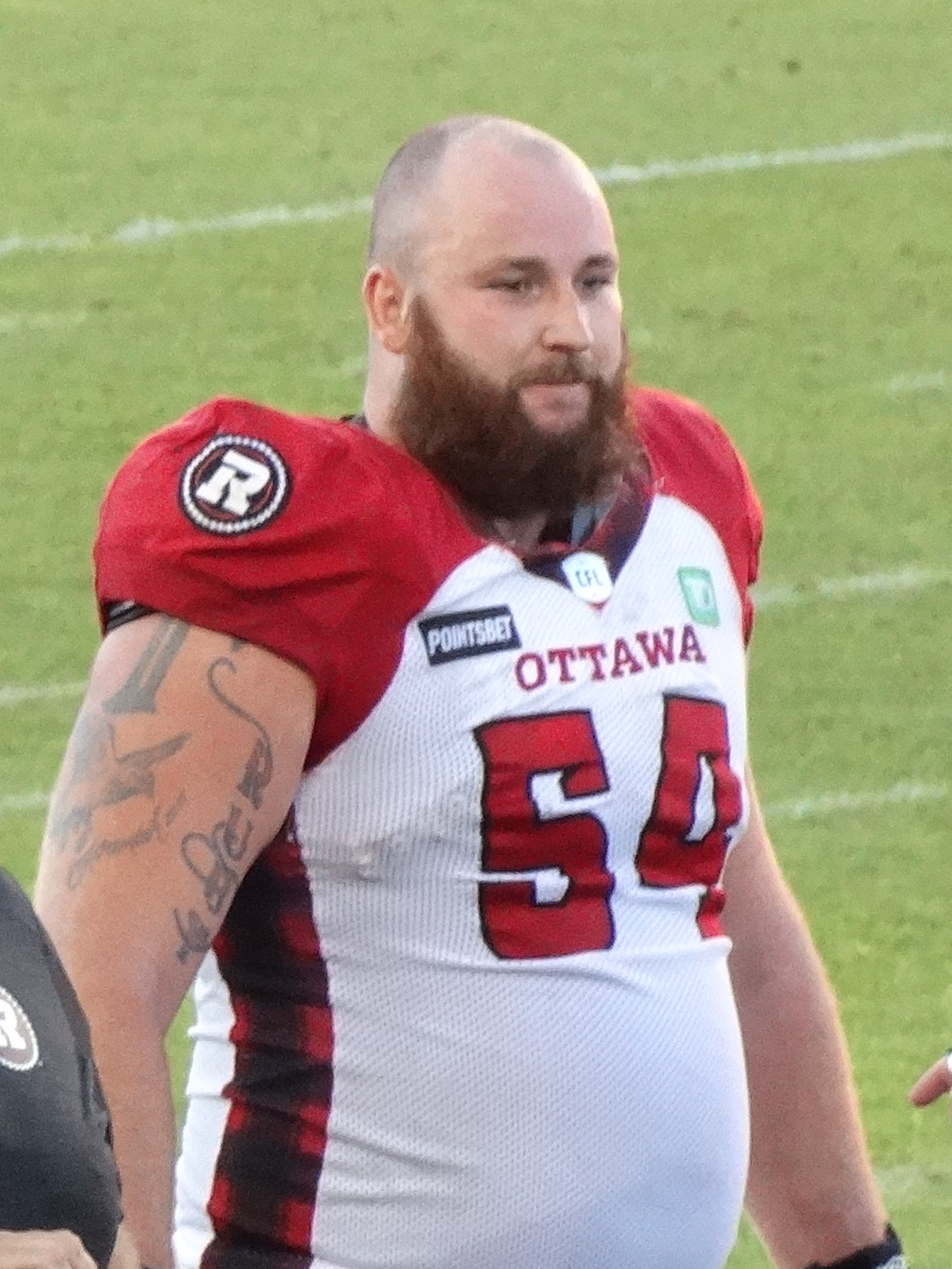
- Ruby with the Ottawa Redblacks in 2022

Profile
- Position: Offensive lineman

Personal information
- Born: December 13, 1992 (age 33); London, Ontario, Canada
- Listed height: 6 ft 7 in (2.01 m)
- Listed weight: 325 lb (147 kg)

Career information
- High school: Fork Union Military Academy (Fork Union, Virginia)
- College: Richmond
- CFL draft: 2015: 1st round, 8th overall pick

Career history
- 2015–2017: Montreal Alouettes
- 2017–2021: Edmonton Eskimos / Elks
- 2022–2025: Ottawa Redblacks

Awards and highlights
- CFL East All-Star (2022)
- Stats at CFL.ca

Jacob Ruby (born December 13, 1992) is a Canadian professional football offensive lineman. He most recently played for the Ottawa Redblacks of the Canadian Football League (CFL). Ruby played football throughout his youth and played for both high school and college teams. He was a 2010 graduate of Fork Union Military Academy. Ruby was a four-year starter at the University of Richmond.

== Early life ==
Ruby began his football career with Medway High School, near London, Ontario, before moving to Fork Union Military Academy where he was an All-Prep League player. He also played two years of club football for the London Falcons. During his time at the London Falcons, he was named as the team's Most Outstanding Offensive Player. In 2008, he played tight end for FUMA and in 2009 played tackle; earning him an All-State and All-Prep honors.

In January 2010, Ruby was one of 90 players selected to play in the USA vs. The World All-Star game which was broadcast on live TV. In 2010, he was redshirted.

== College career ==
In 2011, Ruby played all 11 games on the offensive line and made 10 starts. He recorded two tackles, one coming against Massachusetts and the other at Delaware.

In 2012, Ruby and the Spiders won a share of the Colonial Athletic Association conference championship, but were snubbed from a playoff spot.

In 2014, Ruby started all 14 games for the Spiders at offensive tackle and was named Third Team All-Conference and a 2nd Team VaSid player. The Spiders reached the quarter-finals of the Football Championship Subdivision playoffs.

== Professional career ==
=== Montreal Alouettes ===
Ruby was selected in the first round, eighth overall, in the 2015 CFL draft by the Montreal Alouettes and signed with the team on May 27, 2015. He dressed for three games in his rookie year in 2015 and played in 17 regular season games in 2016. He began the 2017 season on the injured list, but was then released by the Alouettes on July 5, 2017.

=== Edmonton Eskimos/Elks ===
Shortly after his release from Montreal, Ruby signed with the Edmonton Eskimos on July 17, 2017, and played in two games during the 2017 season. He played in 15 games in 2018, starting two, and became a regular starter in 2019 when he played and started in 17 regular season games.

Ruby did not play in 2020 due to the cancellation of the 2020 CFL season. Instead, he re-signed with Edmonton to a contract extension through 2022 on December 26, 2020. He played and started in the first three regular season games for the newly named Edmonton Elks in 2021, but was released on August 31, 2021, due to a violation of COVID-19 protocols. Ruby reportedly misrepresented his vaccination status to the Elks and was subsequently barred from signing with any CFL teams for the remainder of the 2021 season.

=== Ottawa Redblacks ===
On January 10, 2022, it was announced that Ruby had signed with the Ottawa Redblacks. He was named a CFL East All-Star for his strong play during the 2022 season. On May 12, 2023, Ruby and the Redblacks agreed to a three-year contract extension. He played and started in all 18 regular season games in 2023.

On January 31, 2024, Ruby was released by the Redblacks. However, he re-signed with the team on February 12, 2024. Ruby dressed in 17 games in 2024, but started in just seven. He did however, start in the team's East Semi-Final loss to the Toronto Argonauts. He dressed in all 18 regular season games in 2025. He became a free agent upon the expiry of his contract on February 10, 2026.
