= 2015 CFL draft =

Canadian football draft

2015 CFL Draft

General information
- Sport: Canadian football
- Date: May 12
- Time: 8:00 PM EDT
- Location: Toronto
- Network: TSN2/RDS2

Overview
- 62 total selections in 7 rounds
- First selection: Alex Mateas
- Most selections: Montreal Alouettes (9)
- Fewest selections: Edmonton Eskimos (5)
- CIS selections: 44
- NCAA selections: 18

The 2015 CFL draft took place on Tuesday, May 12, 2015, at 8:00 PM ET on TSN2 and RDS2. 62 players were chosen from among eligible players from Canadian Universities across the country, as well as Canadian players playing in the NCAA.

For the first time since the 2006 CFL draft, an NCAA player was drafted first overall, with Alex Mateas from the University of Connecticut being selected with the top pick. Six offensive linemen were drafted in the first round, which broke the previous record of five in the 1987 CFL draft. A total of 44 CIS football players were selected in the draft with the Calgary Dinos earning the most selected players with seven, including two within the first three picks. 13 trades were made involving 15 draft picks, with all of the trades occurring before the draft.

The first two rounds were broadcast live on TSN with CFL Commissioner Jeffrey Orridge announcing each selection. The production was hosted by Farhan Lalji and featured the CFL on TSN panel which included Duane Forde, Paul LaPolice, Mike Benevides, and Lee Barrette who analyzed the teams' needs and picks.

== Top prospects ==
Source: CFL Scouting Bureau rankings.

Final ranking	December ranking	September ranking	Player	Position	School
1	-	-	Christian Covington	Defensive lineman	Rice
2	1	1	Brett Boyko	Offensive lineman	UNLV
3	2	6	Alex Mateas	Offensive lineman	UConn
4	4	2	Tyler Varga	Running back	Yale
5	8	4	Danny Groulx	Offensive lineman	Laval
6	7	8	Sukh Chungh	Offensive lineman	Calgary
7	3	5	Daryl Waud	Defensive lineman	Western
8	-	-	Lemar Durant	Wide receiver	Simon Fraser
9	5	3	Nic Demski	Wide receiver	Manitoba
10	6	14	Sean McEwen	Offensive lineman	Calgary
11	12	12	Chris Ackie	Defensive back	Wilfrid Laurier
12	9	11	Addison Richards	Wide receiver	Regina
13	10	7	Jacob Ruby	Offensive lineman	Richmond
14	17	-	Byron Archambault	Linebacker	Montreal
15	-	18	Tevaughn Campbell	Defensive back	Regina
16	-	-	Shaquille Murray-Lawrence	Running back	UNLV
17	18	17	Ese Mrabure-Ajufo	Defensive lineman	Wilfrid Laurier
18	19	19	Jake Harty	Wide receiver	Calgary
19	-	-	Brandon Bridge	Quarterback	South Alabama
20	11	15	Nicholas Shortill	Linebacker	McMaster
-	13	10	Dillon Guy	Offensive lineman	Buffalo
-	14	16	Karl Lavoie	Offensive lineman	Laval
-	15	13	Brandon Tennant	Defensive lineman	Laval
-	16	-	Adam Konar	Linebacker	Calgary
-	20	-	Ettore Lattanzio	Defensive lineman	Ottawa
-	-	9	Mehdi Abdesmad	Defensive lineman	Boston College
-	-	20	Rory Connop	Defensive lineman	Western

== Trades ==
In the explanations below, (D) denotes trades that took place during the draft, while (PD) indicates trades completed pre-draft.

=== Round one ===
- Hamilton → Montreal (PD). Hamilton traded this selection and a third-round pick in the draft to Montreal for Ryan Bomben.

=== Round two ===
- Saskatchewan → Winnipeg (PD). Saskatchewan traded this selection and Kris Bastien to Winnipeg for Cory Watson and a third-round selection in the draft.

=== Round three ===
- Ottawa → Calgary (PD). Ottawa traded this selection and a third-round pick in the 2014 CFL draft to Calgary for Justin Phillips and a third-round selection in the 2014 CFL draft.
- Saskatchewan → Hamilton (PD). Saskatchewan traded this selection and a third-round pick in the 2016 CFL draft to Hamilton for Brandon Boudreaux, a fourth-round pick in this year's draft and a fourth-round pick in the 2016 CFL draft.
- Winnipeg → Saskatchewan (PD). Winnipeg traded this selection and Cory Watson to Saskatchewan for Kris Bastien and a second-round selection in the draft.
- Winnipeg → Hamilton (PD). Winnipeg traded this selection to Hamilton for Abraham Kromah and a third-round pick in the draft.
- Hamilton → Winnipeg (PD). Hamilton traded this selection and Abraham Kromah to Winnipeg for a third-round pick in the draft.
- Hamilton → Montreal (PD). Hamilton traded this selection and a first-round pick in the draft to Montreal for Ryan Bomben.
- Montreal → Calgary (PD). Montreal traded this conditional selection (which became a third-round pick) and a fifth-round selection in the 2014 CFL draft to Calgary for Larry Taylor, a fifth-round selection in the 2014 CFL draft, and a conditional selection in this year's draft (which became a fourth-round pick).

=== Round four ===
- Saskatchewan → Winnipeg (PD). Saskatchewan traded this selection and Patrick Neufeld to Winnipeg for Alex Hall and a second-round pick in the 2014 CFL draft.
- Hamilton → Saskatchewan (PD). Hamilton traded this selection, Brandon Boudreaux, and a fourth-round pick in the 2016 CFL draft to Saskatchewan for a third-round pick in this year's draft and a third-round pick in the 2016 CFL draft.
- Winnipeg → Hamilton (PD). Winnipeg traded this conditional selection (which became a fourth-round pick) to Hamilton for Brian Brohm.
- Calgary → Montreal (PD). Calgary traded this conditional selection (which became a fourth-round pick), a fifth-round selection in the 2014 CFL draft, and Larry Taylor to Montreal for a fifth-round selection in the 2014 CFL draft and a conditional selection (which became a third-round pick).

=== Round five ===
- Hamilton → BC (PD). Hamilton traded this selection to BC for Seydou Junior Haidara.

=== Round six ===
- Edmonton → Hamilton (PD). Edmonton traded this selection and Ricardo Colclough to Hamilton for Darcy Brown.
- Toronto → Saskatchewan (PD). Toronto traded a conditional selection (which became a sixth round pick) to Saskatchewan for Dwight Anderson.

=== Round seven ===
- Winnipeg → Toronto (PD). Winnipeg traded a conditional selection (which became a seventh round pick) to Toronto for Josh Portis.

=== Conditional trades ===
- Calgary → Hamilton (PD). Calgary traded a conditional selection (condition not met) to Hamilton for Dee Webb.
- Edmonton → Hamilton (PD). Edmonton traded a conditional selection (condition not met) and a fourth-round pick in the 2016 CFL draft to Hamilton for Steve Myddelton.

== Forfeitures ==
- Edmonton forfeits their fifth round selection after selecting Mike Dubuisson in the 2014 Supplemental Draft.

== Draft order ==
= CFL Division All-Star	= CFL All-Star	= Hall of Famer

=== Round one ===
Pick #	CFL team	Player	Position	School
1	Ottawa Redblacks	Alex Mateas	OL	UConn
2	Winnipeg Blue Bombers	Sukh Chungh	OL	Calgary
3	Toronto Argonauts	Sean McEwen	OL	Calgary
4	Montreal Alouettes	Chris Ackie	DB	Wilfrid Laurier
5	BC Lions	Ese Mrabure-Ajufo	DL	Wilfrid Laurier
6	Saskatchewan Roughriders	Nic Demski	WR	Manitoba
7	Edmonton Eskimos	Danny Groulx	OL	Laval
8	Montreal Alouettes (via Hamilton)	Jacob Ruby	OL	Richmond
9	Calgary Stampeders	Karl Lavoie	OL	Laval

=== Round two ===
Pick #	CFL team	Player	Position	School
10	Ottawa Redblacks	Jake Harty	WR	Calgary
11	Winnipeg Blue Bombers	Addison Richards	WR	Regina
12	Toronto Argonauts	Daryl Waud	DL	Western
13	Montreal Alouettes	Nick Shortill	LB	McMaster
14	BC Lions	Brett Boyko	OL	UNLV
15	Winnipeg Blue Bombers (via Saskatchewan)	Brendan Morgan	DB	Queen's
16	Edmonton Eskimos	David Beard	OL	Alberta
17	Hamilton Tiger-Cats	Byron Archambault	LB	Montreal
18	Calgary Stampeders	Lemar Durant	WR	Simon Fraser

=== Round three ===
Pick #	CFL team	Player	Position	School
19	Calgary Stampeders (via Ottawa)	Tyler Varga	RB	Yale
20	Hamilton Tiger-Cats (via Winnipeg)	Jonathan Langa	LB	Saint Mary's
21	Toronto Argonauts	Cameron Walker	DL	Guelph
22	Calgary Stampeders (via Montreal)	Tevaughn Campbell	DB	Regina
23	BC Lions	Shaquille Murray-Lawrence	RB	UNLV
24	Montreal Alouettes (via Hamilton via Saskatchewan)	James Bodanis	OL	Michigan State
25	Edmonton Eskimos	Adam Konar	LB	Calgary
26	Saskatchewan Roughriders (via Winnipeg, via Hamilton Tiger-Cats)	Rory Connop	DL	Western
27	Calgary Stampeders	William Langlais	FB	Sherbrooke

=== Round four ===
Pick #	CFL team	Player	Position	School
28	Ottawa Redblacks	Tanner Doll	LS	Calgary
29	Hamilton Tiger-Cats (via Winnipeg)	Ron Omara	LB	St. Francis Xavier
30	Toronto Argonauts	Matt Norzil	WR	Laval
31	Montreal Alouettes	Brandon Bridge	QB	South Alabama
32	BC Lions	Adrian Clarke	LB	Bishop's
33	Winnipeg Blue Bombers (via Saskatchewan)	Christophe Normand	RB	Laval
34	Edmonton Eskimos	Andrew Johnson	WR	Fort Lewis
35	Saskatchewan Roughriders (via Hamilton)	Matt Rea	FB	Michigan State
36	Montreal Alouettes (via Calgary)	Alex Charette	WR	Guelph

=== Round five ===
Pick #	CFL team	Player	Position	School
37	Ottawa Redblacks	Jefferson Court	FB	Utah State
38	Winnipeg Blue Bombers	Ettore Lattanzio	DL	Ottawa
39	Toronto Argonauts	Dillon Campbell	RB	Wilfrid Laurier
40	Montreal Alouettes	Mikhail Davidson	WR	Montreal
41	BC Lions	Campbell Allison	OL	Eastern Michigan
42	Saskatchewan Roughriders	Kwame Adjei	DB	Mount Allison
–	Edmonton Eskimos	Forfeit pick		
43	BC Lions (via Hamilton)	Christian Covington	DL	Rice
44	Calgary Stampeders	Dexter Janke	DB	Saskatchewan

=== Round six ===
Pick #	CFL team	Player	Position	School
45	Ottawa Redblacks	Kienan LaFrance	RB	Manitoba
46	Winnipeg Blue Bombers	Justin Warden	LB	Bishop's
47	Saskatchewan Roughriders (via Toronto)	Tyler Langlais	DL	Calgary
48	Montreal Alouettes	Quinn Lawlor	DL	Brigham Young
49	BC Lions	Joshua Brinkworth	DB	Pacific (OR)
50	Saskatchewan Roughriders	Melvin Abankwah	RB	Saint Mary's
51	Hamilton Tiger-Cats (via Edmonton)	Everett Ellefsen	DB	McNeese State
52	Hamilton Tiger-Cats	Daniel English	WR	British Columbia
53	Calgary Stampeders	Aaron Picton	OL	Regina

=== Round seven ===
Pick #	CFL team	Player	Position	School
54	Ottawa Redblacks	Alexandre Leganiere	OL	Montreal
55	Toronto Argonauts (via Winnipeg)	Kevin Bradfield	WR	Toronto
56	Toronto Argonauts	Dan MacDonald	LS	Guelph
57	Montreal Alouettes	Anthony Coady	DB	Montreal
58	BC Lions	Maxx Forde	DE	Idaho
59	Saskatchewan Roughriders	Brandon Tennant	DL	Laval
60	Edmonton Eskimos	Blair Smith	LB	Angelo State
61	Hamilton Tiger-Cats	Preston Huggins	LB	Western
62	Calgary Stampeders	Andrew Buckley	QB	Calgary
