= Skye Dawson =

American football player (born 1990)

No. 16, 18, 88, 17
- Position: Wide receiver

Personal information
- Born: December 2, 1990 (age 35); Mesquite, Texas, U.S.
- Listed height: 5 ft 9 in (1.75 m)
- Listed weight: 180 lb (82 kg)

Career information
- High school: Dallas Christian (Mesquite)
- College: TCU
- NFL draft: 2013: undrafted

Career history
- Washington Redskins (2013)*; Tampa Bay Buccaneers (2013); Detroit Lions (2014–2015)*; Edmonton Eskimos (2015); Calgary Stampeders (2015)
- * Offseason or practice squad member only

Career NFL statistics
- Receptions: 2
- Receiving yards: 12
- Stats at Pro Football Reference

Skye Dawson (born December 12, 1990) is an American former professional football player who was a wide receiver in the National Football League (NFL) and Canadian Football League (CFL). He played college football for the TCU Horned Frogs. He was signed as undrafted free agent by the Washington Redskins in 2013. He also played for the NFL's Tampa Bay Buccaneers and Detroit Lions and the CFL's Edmonton Eskimos and Calgary Stampeders.

== Early life ==
Dawson attended Poteet High School (Mesquite, Texas) before transferring to Dallas Christian School. He was also a track and field standout.

== College career ==
Dawson attended Texas Christian University, where he played for the TCU Horned Frogs football team from 2009 to 2012.

== Professional career ==
=== Washington Redskins ===
Dawson was signed by the Washington Redskins on May 2, 2013, after going unselected in 2013 NFL draft. He was released during final cuts before the start of the 2013 season.

=== Tampa Bay Buccaneers ===
Dawson was signed onto the practice squad of the Tampa Bay Buccaneers on September 3, 2013. He was released on September 24, 2013, but re-signed the next day. The Buccaneers released Dawson on August 24, 2014.

=== Detroit Lions ===
Dawson was signed by the Wild Card Detroit Lions. This was his first time on a playoff squad.

=== Edmonton Eskimos ===
Dawson signed as a free agent with the Edmonton Eskimos on May 30, 2015. Before being placed on the injury list in Week 5, he returned eight kickoffs for 149 yards and 14 punts for 193 yards for the Canadian Football League team.

In September 2015, he was traded to the Calgary Stampeders.

== Track and field ==
Dawson was ranked in the top 10 in the nation in the 100 meters coming out of high school. He Clocked a personal-best time of 10.22 seconds in the 100 meter at the Lancaster Meet of Champions. In 2008 Dawson won the state title in the 200 meter, clocking a time of 20.69 seconds. Dawson also competed in long jump.

=== Personal bests ===
Event	Time (seconds)	Venue	Date
60 meters	6.69	Dallas, Texas	April 21, 2010
100 meters	10.22	Lancaster, Texas	May 12, 2010
200 meters	20.69	Fort Worth, Texas	March 1, 2012
