= Brandon Boudreaux =

American gridiron football player (born 1989)

No. 98
- Position: Defensive end

Personal information
- Born: June 26, 1989 (age 37); Auburn, Alabama, U.S.
- Listed height: 6 ft 1 in (1.85 m)
- Listed weight: 240 lb (109 kg)

Career information
- High school: Auburn
- College: Troy
- NFL draft: 2012: undrafted

Career history
- 2012–2014: Hamilton Tiger-Cats
- 2014: Saskatchewan Roughriders
- 2015–2016: Calgary Stampeders
- Stats at CFL.ca

Brandon Alan Boudreaux (born June 26, 1989) is an American former professional football defensive end who played in the Canadian Football League (CFL). He was signed by the Hamilton Tiger-Cats as a free agent in 2012. He played high school football for the Auburn High School Tigers and college football for the Troy Trojans.

== Early life ==
Boudreaux went to Auburn High School. At Auburn High, Boudreaux was a three-year letter-winner under coaches Robert Maddox and Tim Carter.

== College career ==
Boudreaux played for four seasons at Troy. In 2011, Boudreaux was rated as one of the 10 strongest players in college football.

== Professional career ==
Boudreaux signed with the Hamilton Tiger-Cats as a free agent on May 29, 2012. In his first five games with the Tiger-Cats, he recorded seven tackles and three sacks. He was traded to the Saskatchewan Roughriders on September 24, 2014.

Upon entering free agency, Boudreaux signed with the Calgary Stampeders on February 11, 2015.
