= 2017 Calgary Stampeders season =

Canadian football team season

- Owner: Calgary Sports and Entertainment
- General manager: John Hufnagel
- President: John Hufnagel
- Head coach: Dave Dickenson
- Home stadium: McMahon Stadium

Results
- Record: 13–4–1
- Division place: 1st, West
- Playoffs: Lost Grey Cup
- Team MOP: Alex Singleton
- Team MOC: Alex Singleton
- Team MOR: Marken Michel

Uniform

The 2017 Calgary Stampeders season was the 60th season for the team in the Canadian Football League (CFL) and their 83rd overall. This season is also Dave Dickenson's second season as head coach and John Hufnagel's tenth season as general manager.

On September 24, with a 15–9 win over the Saskatchewan Roughriders, the Stampeders qualified for the playoffs for the 13th straight year and a chance to go for an eighth Grey Cup championship. Despite a loss to the Roughriders on October 20, the Stampeders clinched a first place finish in the West Division, their fourth in five years, on October 21 following a Winnipeg Blue Bombers' loss. The Stampeders set a CFL record for most consecutive victories over a division opponent with 16 straight wins, dating back to the start of the 2016 CFL season. They also tied for the third-best home-winning streak in CFL history with 17 consecutive wins. Finally, they also tied for the third-best single-season winning streak in CFL history with 11 consecutive wins. All of these marks ended with their loss on October 20. They also lost consecutive games for the first time since the 2012 CFL season, with losses to the Saskatchewan Roughriders on October 20 and to the Edmonton Eskimos on October 28, ending a streak of 103 games without back-to-back losses. Their loss to the Winnipeg Blue Bombers to close out the regular season marked the first time since the 2007 CFL season that the Calgary Stampeders lost 3 games in a row, a streak that ended at 180 games. Their loss to the Blue Bombers also marked the first game in 52 contests where the team did not lead at any point during a game. The Stampeders made it all the way to the 105th Grey Cup, but they lost 27–24 to the Toronto Argonauts.

== Offseason ==
=== CFL draft ===
The 2017 CFL draft took place on May 7, 2017. The Stampeders moved from eighth overall to sixth overall in a trade with Winnipeg that involved giving up a fourth-round pick.

Round	Pick	Player	Position	School/Club team	Hometown
1	6	Randy Colling	DL	Gannon	Holland, NY
2	17	Julan Lynch	WR	Saskatchewan	Regina, SK
3	25	Tunde Adeleke	DB	Carleton	Ottawa, ON
4	28	Ante Milanovic-Litre	RB	Simon Fraser	Vancouver, BC
5	43	Felix Gacusana Jr.	OL	Simon Fraser	Burnaby, BC
6	52	Alexandre Gagnon	DL	Sherbrooke	Dolbeau-Mistassini, QC
7	61	Adam Laurensse	DB	Calgary	Sherwood Park, AB
8	70	Richard Sindani	WR	Regina	Regina, SK

== Preseason ==
Week	Date	Kickoff	Opponent	Results		TV	Venue	Attendance	Summary
Week	Date	Kickoff	Opponent	Score	Record	TV	Venue	Attendance	Summary
A	Tues, June 6	7:00 p.m. MDT	vs. BC Lions	W 23–18	1–0	None	McMahon Stadium	25,139	Recap
A	Sun, June 11	5:00 p.m. MDT	at Edmonton Eskimos	W 36–35	2–0	TSN	Commonwealth Stadium	25,723	Recap
B	Bye								

== Regular season ==
=== Standings ===
West Division
Team	GP	W	L	T	Pts	PF	PA	Div	Stk	
Calgary Stampeders	18	13	4	1	27	523	349	7–3	L3	Details
Winnipeg Blue Bombers	18	12	6	0	24	554	492	6–4	W1	Details
Edmonton Eskimos	18	12	6	0	24	510	495	5–5	W5	Details
Saskatchewan Roughriders	18	10	8	0	20	510	430	4–6	L1	Details
BC Lions	18	7	11	0	14	469	501	3–7	L1	Details

=== Schedule ===
Week	Date	Kickoff	Opponent	Results		TV	Venue	Attendance	Summary
Week	Date	Kickoff	Opponent	Score	Record	TV	Venue	Attendance	Summary
1	Fri, June 23	5:30 p.m. MDT	at Ottawa Redblacks	T 31–31 (2OT)	0–0–1	TSN/RDS/ESPNews	TD Place Stadium	24,565	Recap
2	Thurs, June 29	7:00 p.m. MDT	vs. Ottawa Redblacks	W 43–39	1–0–1	TSN/RDS	McMahon Stadium	24,613	Recap
3	Fri, July 7	6:30 p.m. MDT	at Winnipeg Blue Bombers	W 29–10	2–0–1	TSN/RDS	Investors Group Field	30,165	Recap
4	Fri, July 14	5:00 p.m. MDT	at Montreal Alouettes	L 23–30	2–1–1	TSN/RDS	Molson Stadium	18,610	Recap
5	Sat, July 22	7:00 p.m. MDT	vs. Saskatchewan Roughriders	W 27–10	3–1–1	TSN	McMahon Stadium	30,274	Recap
6	Sat, July 29	7:30 p.m. MDT	vs. Hamilton Tiger-Cats	W 60–1	4–1–1	TSN	McMahon Stadium	25,492	Recap
7	Thurs, Aug 3	5:30 p.m. MDT	at Toronto Argonauts	W 41–24	5–1–1	TSN	BMO Field	11,616	Recap
8	Bye								
9	Fri, Aug 18	8:30 p.m. MDT	at BC Lions	W 21–17	6–1–1	TSN	BC Place	20,622	Recap
10	Sat, Aug 26	7:00 p.m. MDT	vs. Toronto Argonauts	W 23–7	7–1–1	TSN	McMahon Stadium	26,150	Recap
11	Mon, Sept 4	1:00 p.m. MDT	vs. Edmonton Eskimos	W 39–18	8–1–1	TSN	McMahon Stadium	33,731	Recap
12	Sat, Sept 9	7:00 p.m. MDT	at Edmonton Eskimos	W 25–22	9–1–1	TSN	Commonwealth Stadium	34,312	Recap
13	Sat, Sept 16	5:00 p.m. MDT	vs. BC Lions	W 27–13	10–1–1	TSN/RDS	McMahon Stadium	28,176	Recap
14	Sun, Sept 24	2:00 p.m. MDT	at Saskatchewan Roughriders	W 15–9	11–1–1	TSN/ESPN2	Mosaic Stadium	33,350	Recap
15	Fri, Sept 29	7:30 p.m. MDT	vs. Montreal Alouettes	W 59–11	12–1–1	TSN/RDS	McMahon Stadium	26,394	Recap
16	Bye								
17	Fri, Oct 13	5:00 p.m. MDT	at Hamilton Tiger-Cats	W 28–25	13–1–1	TSN/ESPN2	Tim Hortons Field	23,672	Recap
18	Fri, Oct 20	7:00 p.m. MDT	vs. Saskatchewan Roughriders	L 7–30	13–2–1	TSN	McMahon Stadium	27,316	Recap
19	Sat, Oct 28	5:00 p.m. MDT	at Edmonton Eskimos	L 20–29	13–3–1	TSN	Commonwealth Stadium	30,601	Recap
20	Fri, Nov 3	7:30 p.m. MDT	vs. Winnipeg Blue Bombers	L 5–23	13–4–1	TSN	McMahon Stadium	24,281	Recap

== Postseason ==
=== Schedule ===
Game	Date	Kickoff	Opponent	Results		TV	Venue	Attendance	Summary
Game	Date	Kickoff	Opponent	Score	Record	TV	Venue	Attendance	Summary
West Semi-Final	Bye								
West Final	Sun, Nov 19	2:30 p.m. MST	vs. Edmonton Eskimos	W 32–28	1–0	TSN/RDS/ESPNews	McMahon Stadium	30,116	Recap
105th Grey Cup	Sun, Nov 26	4:30 p.m. MST	Toronto Argonauts	L 24–27	1–1	TSN/RDS/ESPN2	TD Place Stadium	36,154	Recap

== Roster ==
2017 Calgary Stampeders final roster
Quarterbacks: 15 Andrew Buckley; 19 Bo Levi Mitchell; 12 Ricky Stanzi; Running backs: 26 Rob Cote; 14 Roy Finch; 23 William Langlais; 33 Jerome Messam; 34 Ante Milanovic-Litre; 46 Charlie Power; Receivers: 83 Juwan Brescacin; 89 DaVaris Daniels; 88 Kamar Jorden; 87 Rory Kohlert; 16 Marquay McDaniel; 80 Marken Michel; 86 Anthony Parker	Offensive linemen: 60 Shane Bergman G; 53 Brad Erdos G; 65 Dan Federkeil T; 59 Randy Richards T; 58 Cameron Thorn C/G; 61 Ucambre Williams C; 50 Spencer Wilson T/G; Defensive linemen: 96 Randy Colling DT; 95 Ja'Gared Davis DE; 39 Charleston Hughes DE; 4 Micah Johnson DT; 41 Cordarro Law DE; 98 James Vaughters DE; 97 Derek Wiggan DT	Linebackers: 52 Riley Jones; 20 Dwayne Norman; 49 Alex Singleton; 56 Jameer Thurman; Defensive backs: 27 Tunde Adeleke; 11 Josh Bell; 25 Tommie Campbell; 0 Ciante Evans; 3 Patrick Levels; 35 Shaquille Richardson; 28 Brandon Smith; 2 Adam Thibault; 29 Jamar Wall	Special teams: 54 Pierre-Luc Caron LS; 6 Rob Maver P; 30 René Paredes K; Practice roster: 84 Reggie Begelton SB; 77 Reuben Frank DE; 67 Dillon Guy G; 99 Mike Kashak DE; 85 Julan Lynch WR; 91 Mike Rose DT; 17 Dominique Williams RB; 38 Terry Williams RB; 45 Julian Wilson DB	Injured list: 24 Joe Burnett DB; 1 Lemar Durant WR; 94 Kashawn Fraser DE; 68 Roman Grozman C/G; 51 Maleki Harris LB; 40 Dexter Janke LB; 90 Mike Klassen DT; 63 Pierre Lavertu C; 42 Deron Mayo LB; 48 Wynton McManis LB; 64 Justin Renfrow G/T; 69 Quinn Smith G; 7 Junior Turner DT; 21 Anthony Woodson RB; Italics indicate International player Roster updated 2026-05-20; Depth Chart • Transactions
