= Alex Singleton (linebacker) =

American gridiron football player (born 1993)

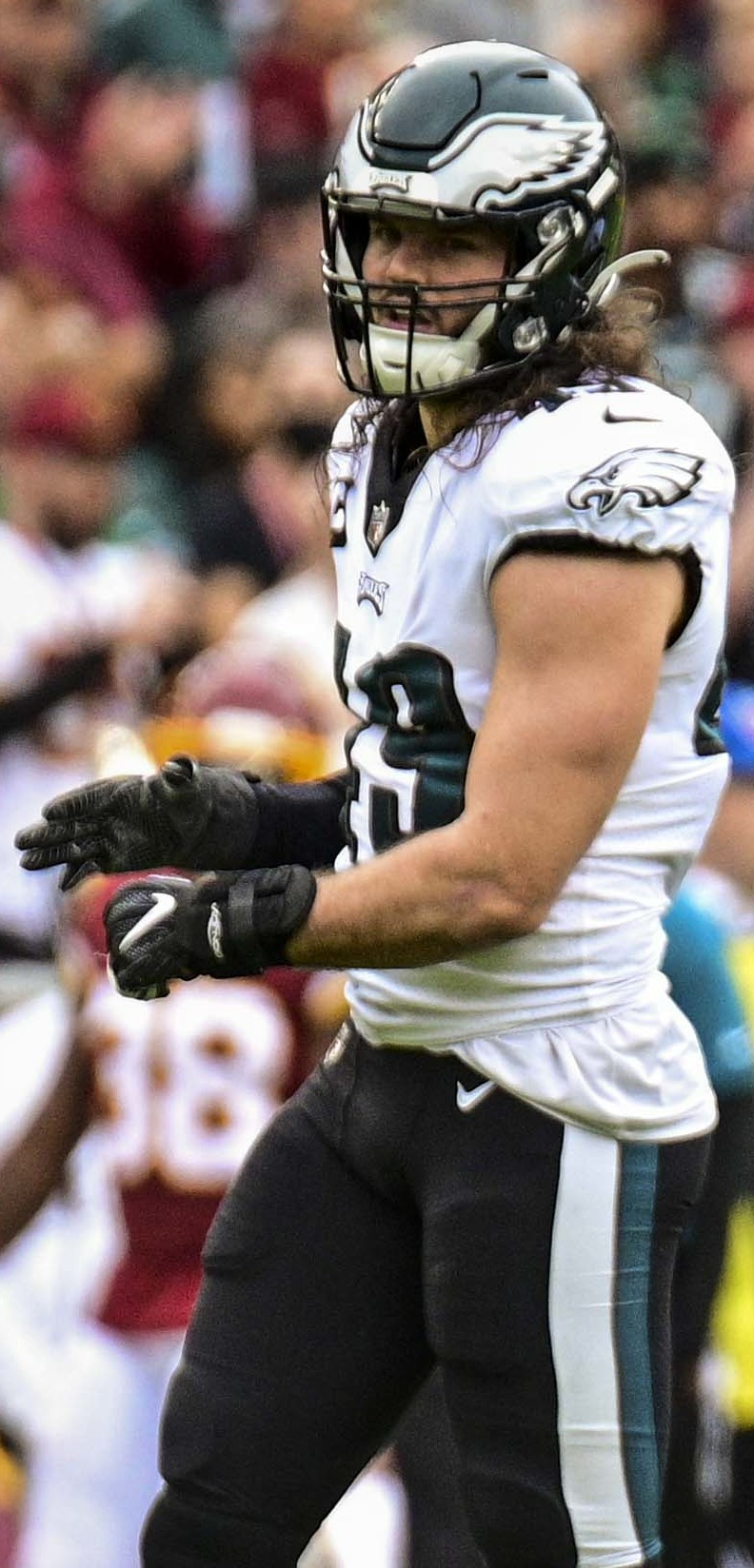
- Singleton with the Philadelphia Eagles in 2022

No. 49 – Denver Broncos
- Position: Inside linebacker
- Roster status: Active

Personal information
- Born: December 7, 1993 (age 32); Thousand Oaks, California, U.S.
- Listed height: 6 ft 2 in (1.88 m)
- Listed weight: 240 lb (109 kg)

Career information
- High school: Thousand Oaks
- College: Montana State (2011–2014)
- NFL draft: 2015: undrafted
- CFL draft: 2016: 1st round, 6th overall pick

Career history
- Seattle Seahawks (2015)*; New England Patriots (2015)*; Minnesota Vikings (2015)*; Calgary Stampeders (2016–2018); Philadelphia Eagles (2019–2021); Denver Broncos (2022–present)
- * Offseason or practice squad member only

Awards and highlights
- Grey Cup champion (2018); CFL Most Outstanding Defensive Player Award (2017); Norm Fieldgate Trophy (2017); 2× CFL All-Star (2017, 2018); Second-Team CFL 2010s All-Decade Team; First-team All-Big Sky (2014)

Career NFL statistics as of Week 9, 2026
- Total tackles: 875
- Sacks: 7.0
- Forced fumbles: 3
- Fumble recoveries: 5
- Pass deflections: 19
- Interceptions: 3
- Defensive touchdowns: 2
- Stats at Pro Football Reference

Career CFL statistics
- Total tackles: 328
- Sacks: 4.0
- Interceptions: 1
- Stats at CFL.ca

Alex Reed Singleton (born December 7, 1993) is a Canadian American professional football inside linebacker for the Denver Broncos of the National Football League (NFL). He played college football for the Montana State Bobcats and was signed as an undrafted free agent by the Seattle Seahawks after the 2015 NFL draft. He has also played for the Philadelphia Eagles and the Calgary Stampeders of the Canadian Football League (CFL).

== Early life and college ==
Singleton is Canadian American. He played college football for the Montana State Bobcats.

== Professional career ==
Pre-draft measurables
Height	Weight	Arm length	Hand span	Wingspan	40-yard dash	10-yard split	20-yard split	20-yard shuttle	Three-cone drill	Vertical jump	Broad jump	Bench press
6 ft 2 1/4 in (1.89 m)	233 lb (106 kg)	31 1/2 in (0.80 m)	9 1/4 in (0.23 m)	6 ft 2 3/8 in (1.89 m)	4.65 s	1.64 s	2.68 s	4.25 s	7.13 s	31.0 in (0.79 m)	10 ft 0 in (3.05 m)	15 reps
All values from Pro Day

=== Seattle Seahawks ===
Singleton was signed as an undrafted rookie free agent by the Seattle Seahawks on May 8, 2015. He signed a three-year contract worth $1,578,500 and received a $3,500 signing bonus. On September 5, he was released.

=== New England Patriots ===
Three days later, Singleton was signed to the practice squad of the New England Patriots. He was released on September 15, 2015.

=== Minnesota Vikings ===
Singleton was signed to the Minnesota Vikings' practice squad on December 22, 2015. He was released on April 13, 2016.

=== Calgary Stampeders ===
Singleton was selected by the Calgary Stampeders of the Canadian Football League (CFL) with the sixth overall pick in the 2016 CFL draft. He had acquired a Canadian passport in October 2015, having qualified for dual citizenship because his mother was born in Toronto. Under then-recently implemented CFL rules, Singleton's Canadian citizenship automatically qualified him to be counted as a Canadian "national" player – previously, players who did not play a meaningful part of their amateur football careers in Canada were counted as "international" players even if they were Canadian citizens. Singleton signed with the team on May 17, 2016. He made his CFL debut on June 25, 2016, against the BC Lions.

Singleton had an exceptional first season in the CFL and quickly became one of the Stampeders important players on defense. Over the course of the season, he played in all 18 regular season games, and the Stamps two playoff games. He contributed 65 defensive tackles, 9 special teams tackles, and 3 forced fumbles.

On November 1, 2017, Singleton was announced as the team's nominee for the CFL's most outstanding defensive player, most outstanding Canadian and most outstanding player awards, including sweeping all votes in the defensive and Canadian player categories. His 121 tackles going into week 20 of the CFL season were already the most in Calgary Stampeders history.

Singleton's 2018 season matched the previous year in tackles with 123. Although he recorded no sacks, Singleton did add 6 special teams tackles for the Stamps, as well as 2 forced fumbles and was named to his second CFL All-Star team. On January 7, Singleton was released by the Stampeders so he could pursue NFL opportunities.

=== Philadelphia Eagles ===
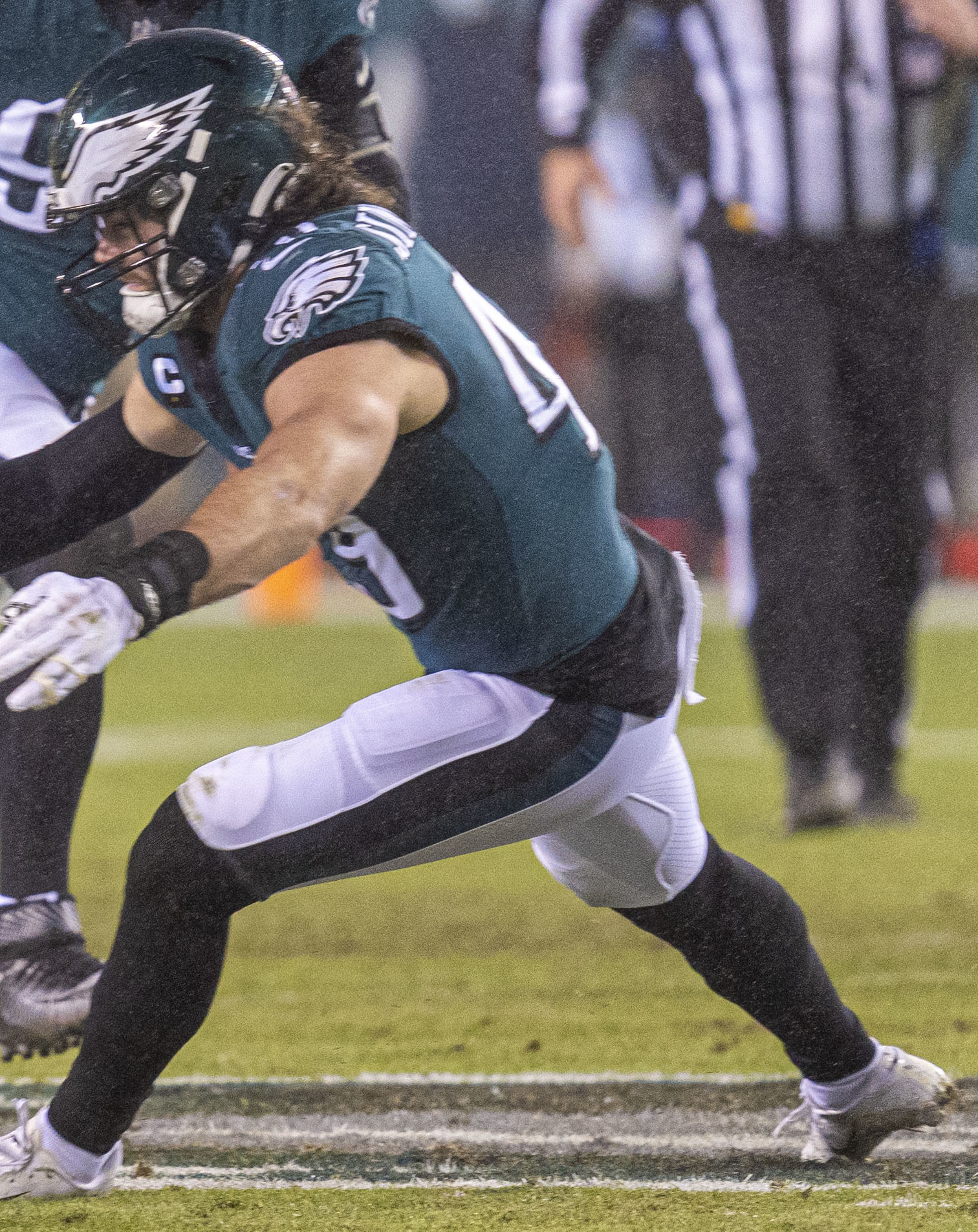
Singleton with the Eagles in 2021

On January 7, 2019, Singleton signed with the Philadelphia Eagles along with CFL teammate Marken Michel.

Singleton played in all four preseason games for the Eagles, and contributed with 28 defensive tackles and one forced fumble. He was waived during final roster cuts on August 30, 2019, but was re-signed to the team's practice squad the next day. On October 16, 2019, Singleton was promoted to the active roster following the release of linebacker Zach Brown. He played in 10 games, only on special teams.

In Week 4 of 2020 against the San Francisco 49ers on Sunday Night Football, Singleton went into the game on defense due to an injury to T. J. Edwards. With less than 6 minutes remaining in the game, Singleton recorded his first career interception off a pass thrown by Nick Mullens and returned it for a 30-yard touchdown during the 25–20 win. By Week 6, Singleton became a starting linebacker for the Eagles. In Week 11 against the Cleveland Browns, Singleton led the team with 12 tackles, sacked Baker Mayfield once, and recovered a fumble lost by Mayfield during the 22–17 loss. In Week 17 against the Washington Football Team on Sunday Night Football, Singleton led the team with 14 tackles and sacked Alex Smith once during the 20–14 loss. Overall, Singleton played in all regular season games with 11 starts and led the Eagles in tackles at 120. As a result, he earned an additional $464,296 through performance-based pay.

On March 1, the Eagles placed a one-year exclusive-rights free agent tender on Singleton, which he signed on March 25, 2021. On September 6, it was announced that he was voted by his teammates to be a team captain for the 2021 season. After initially playing at the starting linebacker position, he was relegated to backup and replaced by Davion Taylor in Week 6. He was put back into the starting position in Week 12 after an injury to Taylor. In Week 16 against the New York Giants, he caught an interception off a deflection from Rodney McLeod and returned it for a 29-yard touchdown, his second career pick-6. He was placed on the COVID-19 list on January 3, 2022. He was activated one week later on January 10, missing just one game where the Eagles did not play their starters as they had already clinched a playoff spot. Singleton finished the season as the team's leading tackler for the 2nd year in a row with 137, the most in a single season by any Eagle since Byron Evans in 1992. In the wild card game against the Buccaneers, Singleton led the team in tackles with 16, which included 4 tackles for loss and one sack in the 31–15 loss.

=== Denver Broncos ===
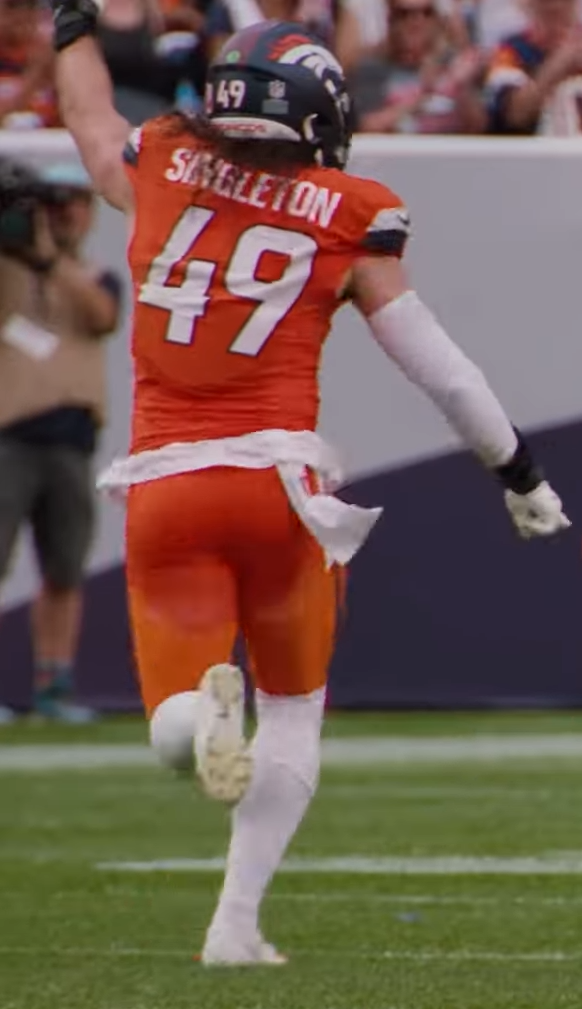
Singleton with the Denver Broncos in 2025

On March 18, 2022, Singleton signed a one-year contract with the Denver Broncos reportedly worth $1.1 million guaranteed with $750k in playing time incentives. The move reunited him with quarterback Russell Wilson, whom Singleton had formed a relationship with during his short stint in Seattle.

On October 17, 2022, during a Week 6 game against the Los Angeles Chargers, Singleton recorded 19 solo tackles and a total of 21 combined tackles in the 19–16 overtime loss. His 19 solo tackles tied Derrick Brooks for the second-most solo tackles in a single game in NFL history. Despite an underwhelming season for the Broncos, Singleton had a career year, ranking 5th in combined tackles during the season with 163.

On March 13, 2023, Singleton signed a three-year, $18 million contract extension with $9 million guaranteed.

Prior to the 2024 season, Singleton was voted a captain by his teammates. On the opening drive of the Broncos' Week 1 game against the Seattle Seahawks, Singleton intercepted a pass by Geno Smith. In Week 3 against the Tampa Bay Buccaneers, Singleton ruptured his ACL. Singleton still managed to play every defensive snap for the rest of the game despite his injury occurring in the 1st quarter. He was subsequently placed on season-ending injured reserve on September 25.

During the 2025 season, Singleton started 16 games and led the Broncos with 135 Tackles en route to being named as an alternate for the 2025 Pro Bowl. On January 17, 2026, during their divisional playoff game against the Buffalo Bills and with Denver already trailing while Buffalo was driving to score, Singleton tackled Bills running back James Cook and forced a fumble which was recovered by teammate Talanoa Hufanga. The play shifted the momentum of the game in Denver's favor and they ultimately won 33–30 in overtime.

On March 10, 2026, Singleton signed a two-year, $15.5 million contract extension with the Broncos. In Week 7 against the Arizona Cardinals, Singleton was named the AFC Defensive Player of the Week after recording 19 tackles (the most by a player in a non-overtime game since 2023), a sack, and two quarterback hits. He was subsequently AFC Defensive Player of the Month for October, with 68 tackles, five tackles-for-loss, and two sacks during that stretch.

== Statistics ==
=== Regular season ===
League	Year	Team	Games		Tackles		Fumbles				Interceptions				
League	Year	Team	G	GS	Comb	Sack	FF	FR	Yds	TD	Int	Yds	Lng	TD	PD
CFL	2016	CGY	18	0	74	0.0	3	1	0	0	0	0	0	0	4
CFL	2017	CGY	18	18	125	4.0	1	0	0	0	1	40	40	0	4
CFL	2018	CGY	18	18	129	0.0	2	1	0	0	0	0	0	0	1
CFL career			54	36	328	4.0	6	2	0	0	1	40	40	0	9

League	Year	Team	Games		Tackles					Fumbles				Interceptions				
League	Year	Team	G	GS	Comb	Solo	Ast	TFL	Sack	FF	FR	Yds	TD	Int	Yds	Lng	TD	PD
NFL	2019	PHI	10	0	5	2	3	0	0.0	0	0	0	0	0	0	0	0	0
NFL	2020	PHI	16	11	120	75	45	5	2.0	0	2	1	0	1	30	30	1	1
NFL	2021	PHI	16	8	137	81	56	4	0.0	1	1	0	0	1	29	29	1	4
NFL	2022	DEN	17	12	163	101	62	6	0.0	1	0	0	0	0	0	0	0	3
NFL	2023	DEN	17	16	177	106	71	6	2.0	0	2	0	0	0	0	0	0	4
NFL	2024	DEN	3	3	31	17	14	1	0.0	0	0	0	0	1	21	21	0	1
NFL	2025	DEN	16	16	135	54	81	3	1.0	1	0	0	0	0	0	0	0	4
NFL	2026	DEN	9	9	107	51	56	5	2.0	0	0	0	0	0	0	0	0	2
NFL career			104	75	875	487	388	30	7.0	3	5	1	0	3	80	30	2	19

=== Postseason ===
League	Year	Team	Games		Tackles		Fumbles				Interceptions				
League	Year	Team	G	GS	Comb	Sack	FF	FR	Yds	TD	Int	Yds	Lng	TD	PD
CFL	2016	CGY	2	0	11	0.0	0	0	0	0	0	0	0	0	0
CFL	2017	CGY	2	2	10	0.0	0	0	0	0	0	0	0	0	0
CFL	2018	CGY	2	2	16	0.0	0	0	0	0	0	0	0	0	0
CFL career			6	4	37	0.0	0	0	0	0	0	0	0	0	0

League	Year	Team	Games		Tackles					Fumbles				Interceptions				
League	Year	Team	G	GS	Comb	Solo	Ast	TFL	Sack	FF	FR	Yds	TD	Int	Yds	Lng	TD	PD
NFL	2019	PHI	1	0	0	0	0	0	0.0	0	0	0	0	0	0	0	0	0
NFL	2021	PHI	1	1	16	10	6	4	1.0	0	0	0	0	0	0	0	0	0
NFL	2025	DEN	2	2	26	15	11	0	0.0	1	0	0	0	0	0	0	0	0
NFL career			4	3	42	25	17	4	1.0	1	0	0	0	0	0	0	0	0

== Personal life ==
Singleton's older sister Ashley was born with Down syndrome. She participates as a Special Olympics athlete and has won multiple gold medals. Due to their relationship, Singleton is a major advocate for the Special Olympics and other disability-friendly events.

On November 3, 2025, Singleton was diagnosed with testicular cancer after taking a random drug test a few days previously that showed an elevated human chorionic gonadotropin level. He underwent surgery for the cancer to be removed on November 7. Singleton subsequently received the Broncos' 2025 Ed Block Courage Award for playing in Week 10 against the Raiders despite his condition.
