= CFL 2010s All-Decade Team =

The Canadian Football League 2010s All-Decade Team is composed of outstanding performers in the Canadian Football League in the ten years spanning 2010–2019. This was the league's first-ever official All-Decade team, which was unveiled on November 19, 2020. The First and Second teams were decided through ballots cast by fans, a selection committee, and a media panel.

== The team ==
Note 1: Only teams for which a player played in a game from 2010 to 2019 are listed. Teams with whom a player signed but never played or for whom he played only prior to 2010 or after 2019 are not listed.

| ^ | Inducted into the Canadian Football Hall of Fame |

=== Offence ===
| Position | First-Team | CFL Status | Second-Team | CFL Status |
|---|---|---|---|---|
| Quarterback | Bo Levi Mitchell (Calgary) | American | Ricky Ray^ (Edmonton, Toronto) | American |
| Running back | Andrew Harris (BC, Winnipeg) | National | Jon Cornish^ (Calgary) | National |
| Receiver | S.J. Green^ (Montreal, Toronto) | American | Greg Ellingson (Hamilton, Ottawa, Edmonton) | American |
| Receiver | Adarius Bowman (Winnipeg, Edmonton, Montreal) | American | Brandon Banks^ (Hamilton) | American |
| Receiver | Weston Dressler^ (Saskatchewan, Winnipeg) | American | Fred Stamps (Edmonton, Montreal) | American |
| Receiver | Emmanuel Arceneaux (BC, Saskatchewan) | American | Derel Walker (Edmonton, Toronto) | American |
| Receiver | Nik Lewis^ (Calgary, Montreal) | American | Bryan Burnham (BC) | American |
| Centre | Jon Gott (Calgary, Ottawa) | National | Luc Brodeur-Jourdain (Montreal) | National |
| Offensive tackle | Stanley Bryant (Calgary, Winnipeg) | American | Chris Van Zeyl (Toronto, Hamilton) | National |
| Offensive tackle | Jovan Olafioye^ (BC, Montreal) | American | Derek Dennis (Calgary, Saskatchewan) | American |
| Offensive guard | Brendon LaBatte (Winnipeg, Saskatchewan) | National | Scott Flory^ (Montreal Alouettes) | National |
| Offensive guard | Ryan Bomben (Montreal, Hamilton, Toronto) | National | Matt O'Donnell (Edmonton) | National |

=== Defence ===
| Position | First-Team | CFL Status | Second-Team | CFL Status |
|---|---|---|---|---|
| Defensive end | Charleston Hughes (Calgary, Saskatchewan) | American | Willie Jefferson (Edmonton, Saskatchewan, Winnipeg) | American |
| Defensive end | John Bowman (Canadian football)^ (Montreal) | American | Odell Willis (Winnipeg, Saskatchewan, Edmonton, BC) | American |
| Defensive tackle | Almondo Sewell (Edmonton) | Global | Micah Johnson (Calgary, Saskatchewan) | American |
| Defensive tackle | Ted Laurent (Edmonton, Hamilton) | National | Eddie Steele (Hamilton, Edmonton, Saskatchewan) | National |
| Linebacker | Solomon Elimimian^ (BC, Saskatchewan) | Global | Alex Singleton (Calgary) | National |
| Linebacker | Adam Bighill (BC, Winnipeg) | American | Henoc Muamba (Winnipeg, Montreal, Saskatchewan) | Global |
| Linebacker | Chip Cox^ (Montreal) | American | Simoni Lawrence (Edmonton, Hamilton) | American |
| Defensive back | Jovon Johnson (Winnipeg, Ottawa, Montreal, Saskatchewan) | American | Ed Gainey (Canadian football) (Montreal, Hamilton, Saskatchewan) | American |
| Defensive back | Ryan Phillips (BC, Montreal) | American | Keon Raymond (Calgary, Toronto, Hamilton) | American |
| Defensive back | Delvin Breaux (Hamilton) | American | Jamar Wall (Calgary) | American |
| Defensive back | Brandon Smith (Calgary) | American | Patrick Watkins (Toronto, Edmonton) | American |
| Safety | Craig Butler (Saskatchewan, Hamilton) | National | Tyron Brackenridge (Saskatchewan) | American |

=== Special teams ===
| Position | First-Team | CFL Status | Second-Team | CFL Status |
|---|---|---|---|---|
| Kicker | Justin Medlock (Toronto, Hamilton, Winnipeg) | American | René Paredes (Calgary) | National |
| Punter | Rob Maver (Calgary) | National | Richie Leone (BC, Ottawa) | American |
| Special teams cover | Mike Miller (Edmonton, Winnipeg) | National | Jason Arakgi (BC) | National |
| Special teams returner | Brandon Banks^ (Hamilton) | American | Chad Owens^ (Toronto, Hamilton, Saskatchewan) | American |

=== Coach ===
| Position | First-Team | Second-Team |
|---|---|---|
| Head coach | John Hufnagel (Calgary) | Dave Dickenson (Calgary) |
