= Bo Levi Mitchell =

American gridiron football player (born 1990)

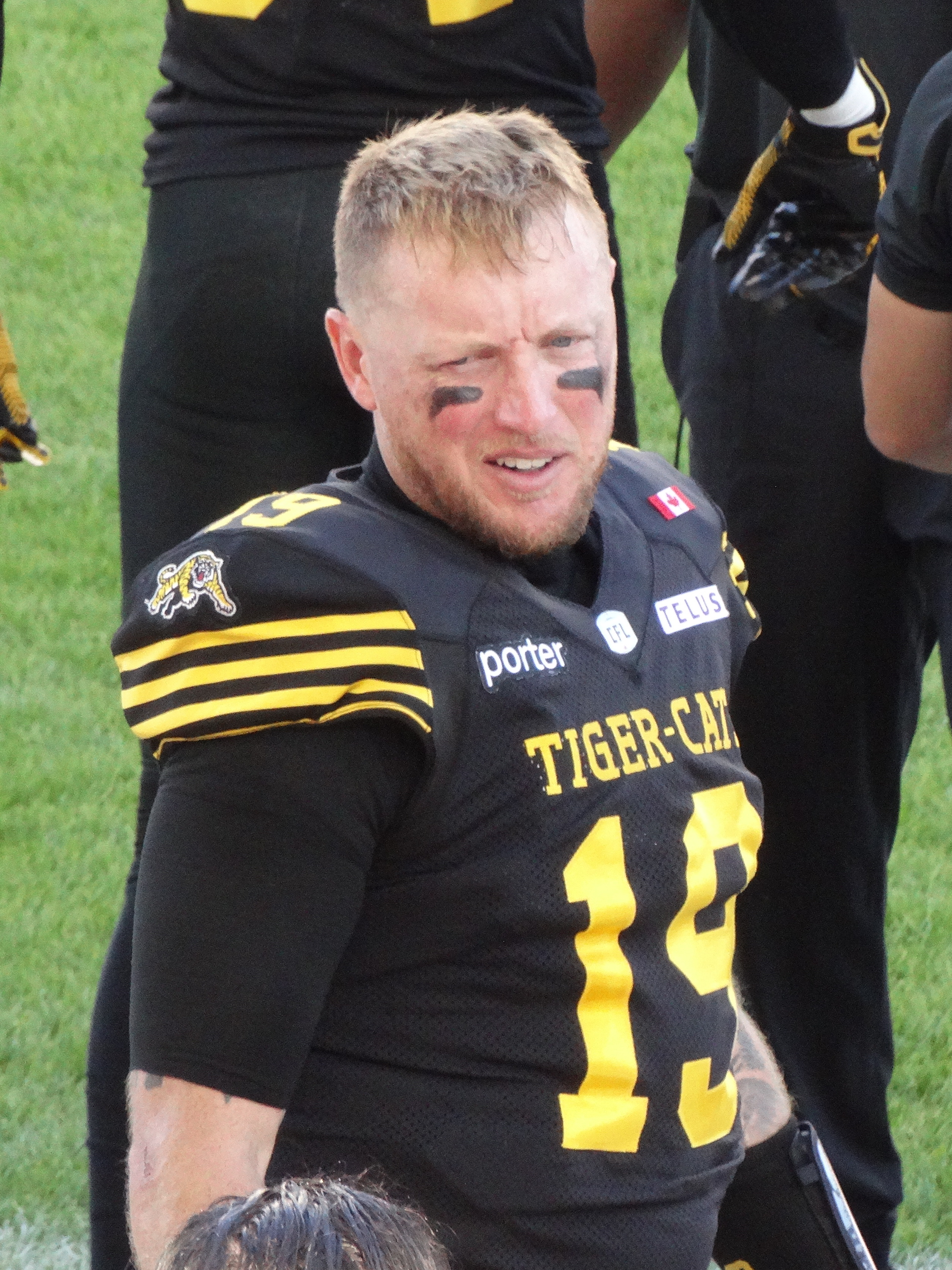
- Mitchell with the Hamilton Tiger-Cats in 2025

No. 19 – Hamilton Tiger-Cats
- Position: Quarterback
- Roster status: 6-game injured list
- CFL status: American

Personal information
- Born: March 3, 1990 (age 36); Katy, Texas, U.S.
- Listed height: 6 ft 1 in (1.85 m)
- Listed weight: 210 lb (95 kg)

Career information
- High school: Katy
- College: SMU (2008–2010); Eastern Washington (2010–2011)
- NFL draft: 2012: undrafted

Career history
- Calgary Stampeders (2012–2022); Hamilton Tiger-Cats (2023–present)

Awards and highlights
- 2× Grey Cup champion (2014, 2018); 2× Grey Cup Most Valuable Player (2014, 2018); 2× CFL Most Outstanding Player Award (2016, 2018); 3× Jeff Nicklin Memorial Trophy (2015, 2016, 2018); 2× Terry Evanshen Trophy (2024, 2025); 3× CFL All-Star (2016, 2018, 2024); 3× CFL West All-Star (2015, 2016, 2018); 2× CFL East All-Star (2024, 2025); 2× CFL passing yards leader (2024, 2025); 4× CFL passing touchdowns leader (2016, 2018, 2024, 2025); First-team CFL 2010s All-Decade Team; FCS national champion (2010); FCS National Championship Game Most Outstanding Player (2010); Consensus first-team FCS All-American (2011); Walter Payton Award (2011); Big Sky Conference Offensive Player of the Year (2011); First-team All-Big Sky (2011); CFL records: CFL record for most consecutive wins by a starting quarterback (14); CFL record for fastest starting quarterback to 60 wins (72 starts); CFL record for fastest starting quarterback to 100 wins (144 starts)

Career CFL statistics as of 2026
- Passing completions: 3,508
- Passing attempts: 5,348
- Completion percentage: 65.6
- TD–INT: 271–129
- Passing yards: 45,426
- Win/loss record: 112–48–2
- Stats at CFL.ca

Bo Levi Mitchell (born March 3, 1990) is an American professional football quarterback for the Hamilton Tiger-Cats of the Canadian Football League (CFL). He played college football at SMU and Eastern Washington, leading Eastern Washington to an FCS national championship victory in 2010. He also won the Walter Payton Award in 2011 as the best offensive player in the FCS.

After going undrafted in the 2012 NFL draft, Mitchell signed with the CFL's Calgary Stampeders in 2012. He became Calgary's starting quarterback for the 2014 season, setting a number of club and league records including best record for a first-time starting quarterback in league history (12 wins, 1 loss). He won the 102nd Grey Cup in 2014, the CFL's Most Outstanding Player Award in 2016 and 2018, and the 106th Grey Cup in 2018. With his second Grey Cup win as starter, he became the first quarterback to start and win multiple Grey Cup games with the Stampeders organization. Mitchell was named the first-team quarterback on the CFL's 2010–2019 All-Decade Team.

After two injury-plagued seasons and a benching, Mitchell signed with the Tiger-Cats as a free agent in 2023. He led the CFL in passing yards for the first time in 2024 and repeated the feat in 2025. Mitchell is seventh all-time in CFL history in starting quarterback wins, and the fastest quarterback to reach 100 wins. He is also eighth all-time in career passing yards.

== Early life ==
Mitchell was born on March 3, 1990, in Katy, Texas. He played high school football at Katy High School, and took over as the starting quarterback after Andy Dalton graduated. As a senior in 2007, Mitchell passed for 2,451 yards and 37 touchdowns with only four interceptions. He led Katy to a 16–0 undefeated season and a state championship. He was named to the Houston Chronicle's Houston Top 110. Mitchell graduated from Katy High in 2008. He chose to attend Southern Methodist University over an offer from Hawaii. Mitchell was also recruited by Eastern Washington.

== College career ==
=== SMU (2008–2009) ===
Mitchell played two seasons of college football for the SMU Mustangs from 2008 to 2009. As a true freshman in 2008, he threw for 2,865 yards and 24 touchdowns. However, SMU finished the 2008 season with a 1–11 record while Mitchell's 23 interceptions were the most in the NCAA Division I Football Bowl Subdivision.

Mitchell started the first seven games of the 2009 season before suffering a shoulder injury and being replaced by freshman Kyle Padron. Mitchell recovered from his injury but Padron remained the starter. Overall in 2009, Mitchell completed 56 percent of his passes for 1,725 yards and 12 touchdowns with 10 interceptions for a passer rating of 117.9. SMU was 3–4 in Mitchell's seven starts before winning five of its last six to finish 8–5. Mitchell started all 19 of the games he played at SMU, finishing with totals of 385 completions on 676 pass attempts (57.0 percent) for 4,590 yards (241.6 per game), 36 touchdowns, and 33 interceptions. His passer rating was 121.8.

=== Eastern Washington (2010–2011) ===
As a junior in 2010, Mitchell transferred to Eastern Washington University, which had previously recruited Mitchell out of high school. He helped lead the Eagles to victory in the FCS Championship Game, a 20–19 come-from-behind victory over the University of Delaware, the school's first national championship in football. He was named the game's Most Outstanding Player after throwing three touchdown passes in the final 16 minutes of the game and had 302 total passing yards in the game as well. Mitchell earned honorable mention All-Big Sky Conference and Big Sky All-Academic honors for the 2010 season.

In the 2011 season, Mitchell led the FCS in four statistical categories, including passing yards (4,009) and touchdown passes (33) on his way to breaking four school records. He broke EWU's record for single season passing yards with 4,009, which ranks 17th in FCS history and fifth in Big Sky Conference history. Mitchell won the Walter Payton Award as the best offensive player in the FCS. He was also named the Big Sky Conference Offensive Player of the Year and first-team All-Big Sky. Mitchell was named to seven All-America teams this season, earning first team honors on six of them. He was the top quarterback on teams selected by The Sports Network, American Football Coaches Association, Walter Camp, Associated Press, Phil Steele Publications and Beyond Sports College Network. He majored in interdisciplinary liberal arts at Eastern Washington.

== Professional career ==
=== Pre-draft ===
Pre-draft measurables
Height	Weight	40-yard dash	10-yard split	20-yard split	20-yard shuttle	Three-cone drill	Vertical jump	Broad jump	Bench press
6 ft 0 in (1.83 m)	198 lb (90 kg)	4.93 s	1.67 s	2.80 s	4.41 s	7.04 s	30.0 in (0.76 m)	8 ft 4 in (2.54 m)	10 reps
All values from Pro Day

After his senior year, Mitchell was invited to play in the inaugural NFLPA Collegiate Bowl. He was rated the 39th best quarterback in the 2012 NFL draft by NFLDraftScout.com. He went undrafted. Mitchell was thought to be too small to play in the NFL. He was also noted for wearing a glove on his throwing hand. The Houston Texans was the only NFL team that offered Mitchell a workout.

=== Calgary Stampeders (2012–2022) ===
==== 2012: Backup season and first Grey Cup appearance ====
On April 30, 2012, the Calgary Stampeders of the Canadian Football League (CFL) signed Mitchell to a free-agent contract. Mitchell saw limited playing time in the 2012 CFL season, playing as a third-string backup behind Drew Tate and Kevin Glenn and ahead of Brad Sinopoli.

He ran quarterback sneaks in the short-yardage offense, and scored his first CFL rushing touchdown in week 3 against the Montreal Alouettes. Mitchell was also the holder on field goal and convert attempts. It was in this role that he registered his first CFL touchdown pass. In Calgary's eleventh game of the season against the Winnipeg Blue Bombers, Calgary was lining up for a field goal attempt, but faked it when Mitchell flipped the ball to Rob Cote who ran up the middle of the field for a 26-yard touchdown.

In the final game of the regular season against the Edmonton Eskimos, Mitchell took over for the final drive and moved the offense downfield, allowing Rene Paredes the opportunity to kick the game-winning field goal as Calgary won 30–27. In the West Semi-Final against the Saskatchewan Roughriders, Mitchell scored two one-yard rushing touchdows as the Stampeders won 36–30. In the third quarter of the West Final vs BC, Mitchell faked a quarterback sneak on a third down gamble and threw a long pass to Maurice Price to set Calgary up at the Lions' one-yard line. On first and goal, Mitchell tried to run into the end zone but had two of his ribs broken by Solomon Elimimian. On third and goal, Mitchell stretched his hands out into the end zone and scored a rushing touchdown. The Stampeders later won the game 34–29. In the 100th Grey Cup, with the contest out of reach, Mitchell entered the game and engineered a touchdown drive and a 2-point convert, both caught by Price.

==== 2013: Part-time starter ====
He began the 2013 CFL season as the third-string quarterback again, and continued being the holder on field goal and convert attempts, and running quarterback sneaks in the short-yardage offense. On July 20, 2013, Mitchell came on in the third-quarter after Kevin Glenn left with an injury (Drew Tate was already injured) and completed seven of 13 passes for 49 yards and two touchdowns to help the Stampeders overcome a 24-point deficit to defeat the Alouettes 38–27.

In his first CFL start, on July 26, 2013, in relief of the injured Tate and Glenn, Mitchell completed 29 of 33 passes for 376 yards and three touchdowns with no interceptions in a 37–24 win over the Blue Bombers. The Calgary Herald called it a "debut for the ages". Mitchell won the Gibson's Finest Offensive Player of the Week for this performance. He started two more games for the Stampeders in 2013 (both wins as well) and dressed in all 18 games, finishing the season completing 69.6% of his passes for 1,156 yards, 10 touchdowns and three interceptions: a quarterback rating of 111.2. Mitchell was protected by the Stampeders in the 2013 CFL expansion draft. The expansion Ottawa Redblacks selected Stampeders quarterback Kevin Glenn in the first round of the draft.

==== 2014: First Grey Cup win and CFL MOP ====
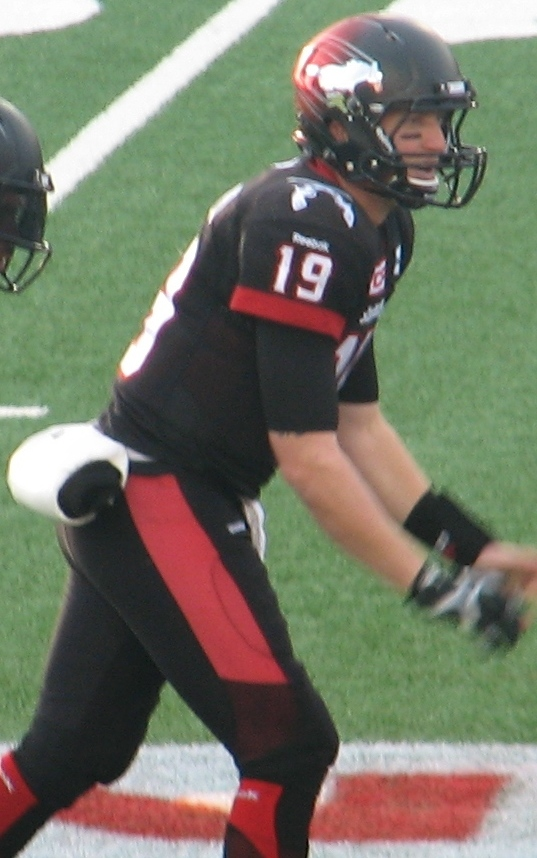
Mitchell with the Calgary Stampeders in 2014

On January 14, 2014, Mitchell signed a contract extension with the Stampeders, which was set to keep him in Calgary through 2016. On June 23, head coach John Hufnagel named Mitchell the starting quarterback and Drew Tate the backup for Calgary's Week 1 game against the Montreal Alouettes. On opening day, Mitchell gave the Stampeders their first win of the season 29–8 after throwing for 313 yards, two touchdowns, and no interceptions. On Thursday, July 24, Mitchell tied Jeff Garcia's CFL record for consecutive career winning starts, going 7–0, with a 26–22 victory over the Edmonton Eskimos.

On September 1, the Stampeders beat the Eskimos again to improve to 9–1, with Mitchell becoming the first CFL quarterback to begin his career with a 12–1 starting record. He passed Jackie Parker and Jim Van Pelt, who both started 11–2. On September 13 against the Toronto Argonauts, Mitchell suffered a sprained ankle and a stretched knee ligament. Mitchell went 12–2 overall as Calgary's starting quarterback in 2014, which helped the team finish in first place in the CFL West Division with a 15–3 record and earn a first round playoff bye. His 98.3 passer rating during the 2014 regular season was the highest in the league.

On November 23, 2014, in his first playoff start, Mitchell led the Stampeders to a victory in the Western Final over division rival Edmonton, earning them a berth in the 102nd Grey Cup. Mitchell and the Stampeders went on to defeat the Hamilton Tiger-Cats 20–16 in the Grey Cup. Mitchell was named Grey Cup MVP after completing 25 of 34 passes for 334 yards and one interception. He also completed ten straight passes, which was the third most in Grey Cup history.

==== 2015 ====
On March 3, 2015, his 25th birthday, Mitchell signed an extension with the Stampeders to keep him in Calgary through the 2018 season. The 2015 campaign was Mitchell's second full season as the Stampeders starting quarterback. He posted career highs in many passing categories, including completions (364), attempts (555), yards (4,551), and touchdowns (26). He went 13–4 as the team's starting quarterback, resting for the final regular season game because Calgary's position in the standings would remain unchanged.

Calgary finished second place in the West Division behind the Edmonton Eskimos, who beat them via a tiebreaker. For his efforts, he was named a CFL West All-Star and the winner of the Jeff Nicklin Memorial Trophy, awarded to the CFL West Division's most outstanding player. After knocking off the BC Lions in the West Semi-Final, the Stampeders were eliminated by the Eskimos who went on to win the 103rd Grey Cup.

==== 2016: Third Grey Cup appearance ====
Mitchell continued to improve in the 2016 season, setting career highs in passing attempts (606), completions (412), yards (5,385) touchdowns (32), and 300 yard games (11). He started the first 17 games in the regular season, leading the Stampeders to first place in the West Division with a 15–1–1 record, including a 16-game unbeaten streak and 14-game winning streak, which set a CFL record for most consecutive wins by a starting quarterback. He rested for the final game of the season because Calgary had already clinched first place in the West. Mitchell and the Stampeders dismantled the BC Lions in the West Division Final, winning 42–15 and advancing to the 104th Grey Cup in the process. He was once again the winner of the Jeff Nicklin Memorial Trophy, and prior to the Grey Cup game, was named the CFL's Most Outstanding Player for the first time.

With 40 seconds left in the Grey Cup and Calgary down three points at Ottawa's two-yard line, head coach John Hufnagel inserted short-yardage quarterback Andrew Buckley on second down for a surprise pass play. However, the play failed and the Stampeders lost a yard. Rene Paredes then kicked a field goal to send the game to overtime. Ottawa clinched the game in overtime 39–33 when Mitchell threw an incompletion on third down. Mitchell finished the game completing 28 of 38 passes for 391 yards, two touchdowns, and three interceptions. The 8–9–1 Redblacks became the first team to win the Grey Cup despite having seven less wins than the other team (15–2–1 Calgary).

==== 2017: Fourth Grey Cup appearance ====
In 2017, Mitchell once again started the first 17 regular season games at quarterback for Calgary, and rested in the final regular season game because Calgary had already clinched first place in the West. Mitchell's record as the starting quarterback was 13–3–1. In the West Division Final, Calgary defeated Edmonton to advance to the 105th Grey Cup against the Toronto Argonauts. With 20 seconds left in the game and Calgary down three points at Toronto's 25-yard line, Mitchell took an aggressive shot into the end zone but was intercepted. Toronto won 27–24.

==== 2018: Second Grey Cup win and second CFL MOP ====
In 2018, Mitchell led the Stampeders to first place in the West Division for the third consecutive year. He started all 18 regular season games, including the final game in BC because Calgary needed to win the game to clinch first place. Calgary posted a 13–5 record. That year, Mitchell became the fastest quarterback to 60 wins in CFL history, only taking 72 starts to do so, surpassing Ken Ploen who had previously held the record with 60 wins, with 78 starts. Mitchell won the Jeff Nicklin Memorial Trophy for the third time in his career, and was named the CFL's Most Outstanding Player for the second time. Calgary defeated Winnipeg in the West Division Final, which allowed Calgary to play in their third consecutive Grey Cup. They went on to win the 106th Grey Cup 27–16 over the Ottawa Redblacks. Mitchell was named the Grey Cup MVP for the second time in his career after completing 24 of 36 passes for 253 yards, two touchdowns, and two interceptions.

After the 2018 Grey Cup, Mitchell had risen to the top four in several all-time Grey Cup career passing categories: fourth in attempts (165), third in completions (116), and third in yards (1,431). Shortly after winning the Grey Cup, Mitchell announced that he would be pursuing NFL opportunities before signing another CFL contract.

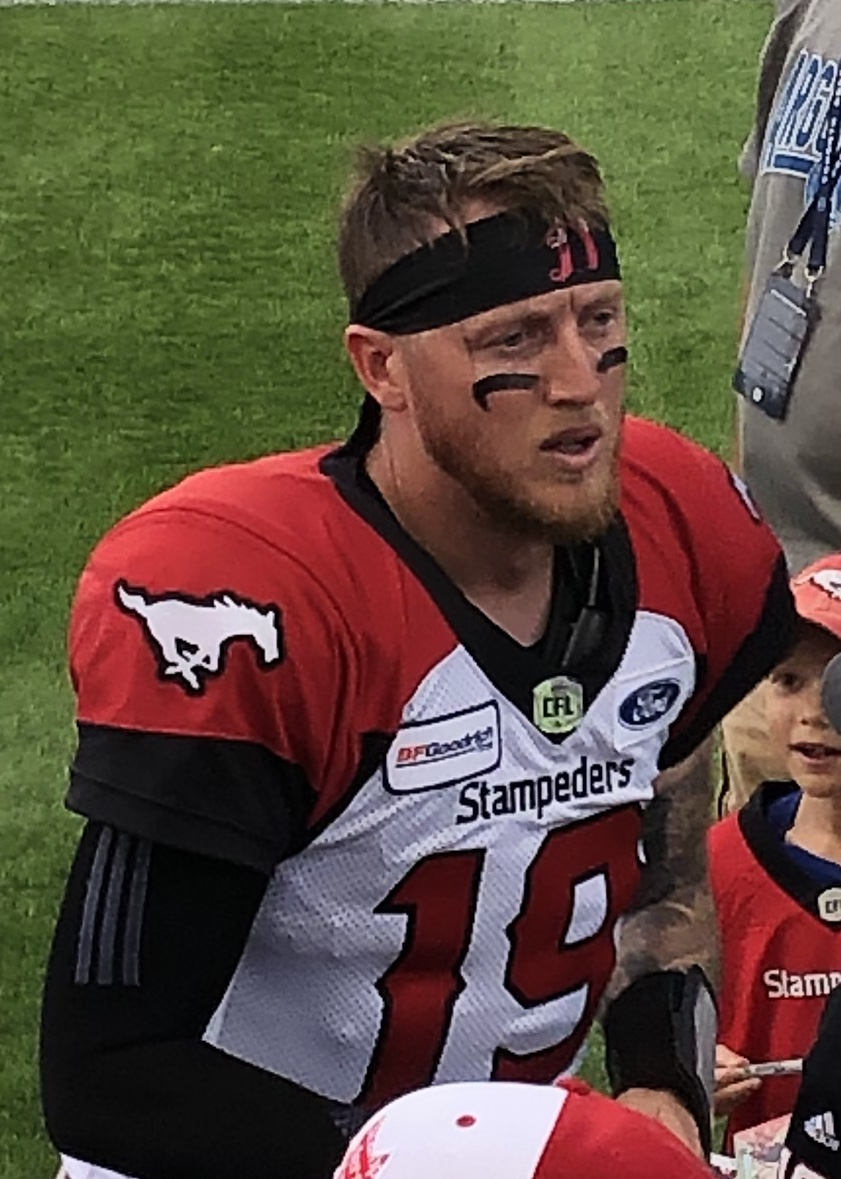
Mitchell in 2019

==== NFL and CFL free agency ====
Mitchell attended his first NFL workout on December 5, 2018, with the Minnesota Vikings, with more than five teams inviting him to a workout and ten inquiring about him in the days and weeks subsequent to his first NFL workout. Mitchell attracted some attention at his Vikings interview by saying that he was going to take Kirk Cousins' job. Mitchell said the Vikings staffer then told him that there would be no quarterback competition and that they only wanted a backup. Mitchell also worked out for the Denver Broncos, Jacksonville Jaguars, Buffalo Bills, New York Giants and Chicago Bears.

During the 2019 CFL free agency, Mitchell officially became a free agent and had not yet been signed by an NFL team with CFL teams beginning to offer contracts such as the Toronto Argonauts, the Edmonton Eskimos and the Saskatchewan Roughriders with the minimum contract being offered to Mitchell being rumored around $750,000 CAD per season.

==== 2019: Injury problems ====
On February 12, 2019, Mitchell re-signed with the Stampeders, in a four-year deal worth $2.8 million CAD. Mitchell suffered a pectoral injury in Week 3 and was subsequently placed on the six-game injured reserve list. By mid-August Mitchell was appearing to be close to a return, however, he was placed back on the 6-game injured reserve list on August 16 after suffering a minor setback. He was taken off the 6-game injured reserve list 13 days later, on August 29, 2019, and made his return to the starting lineup that weekend. In total he missed seven games during the 2019 season. Mitchell led the team to a 7–2 record over the final half of the season. However, in the West Semi-Final against the Blue Bombers, he completed only 12 passes for 116 yards and a touchdown as Calgary lost 35–14.

==== 2020–2021 ====
Mitchell did not play in 2020 because the CFL season was cancelled due to the COVID-19 pandemic. In November 2020, he was named the first-team quarterback on the CFL's 2010–2019 All-Decade Team.

Following Calgary's second game of the 2021 season, the Stampeders placed Mitchell on the six-game injured reserve with a broken fibula. Mitchell returned in Week 6 having missed only three games. Mitchell played the rest of the season despite injuring his shoulder in Week 9 against the Roughriders. The Stampeders finished 8–6 during the abbreviated 2014 season, and were eliminated by the Roughriders in overtime in the first round of the playoffs. This was the first season in which Mitchell threw more interceptions (13) than touchdowns (10).

==== 2022: Benching ====
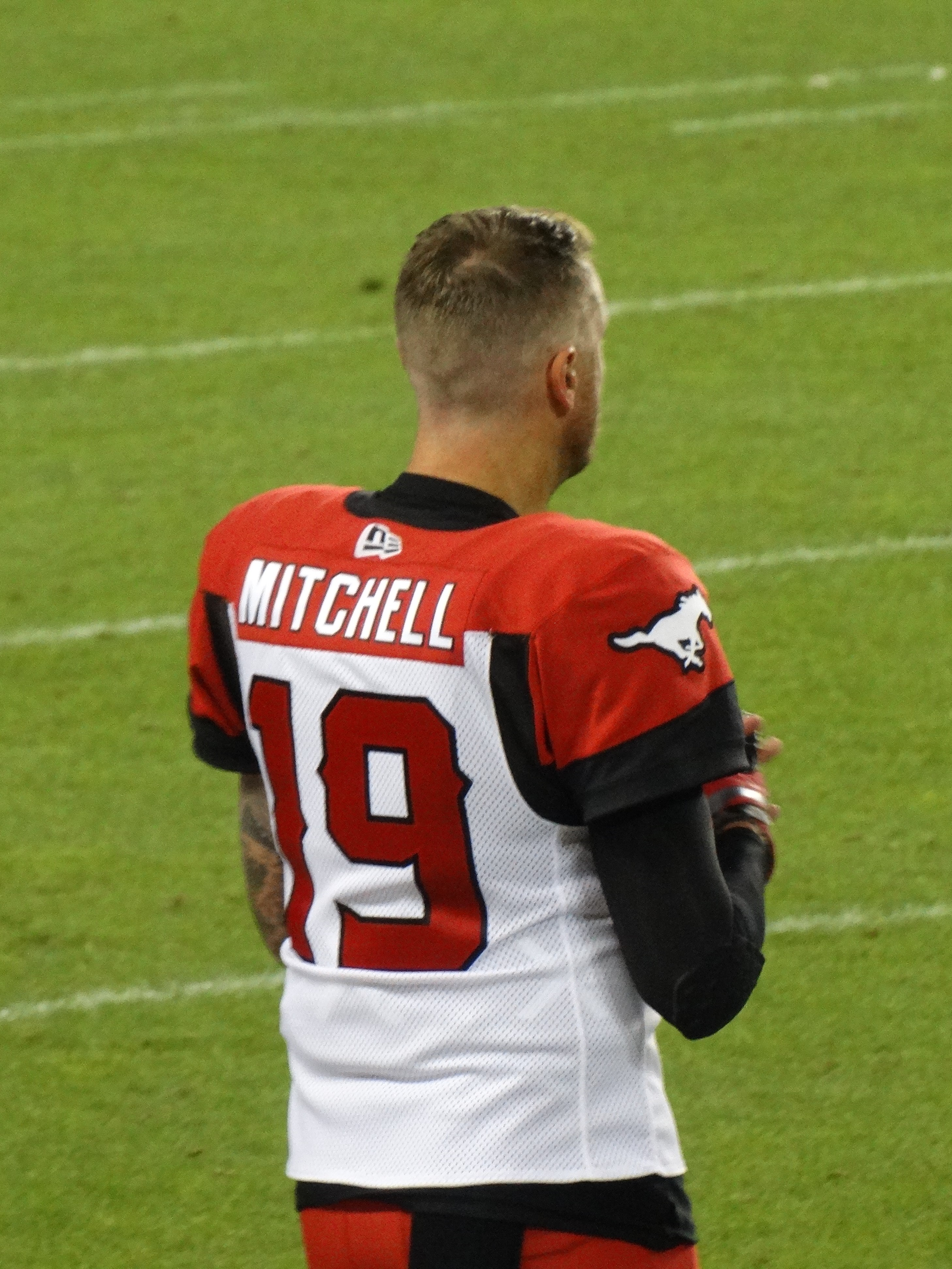
Mitchell in 2022

After having missed time with injuries during the 2019 and 2021 seasons in April 2022 Mitchell stated that "retirement might be the next step" if he is unable to maintain his health. He restructured his contract for the 2022 season. After starting the first half of the season, Mitchell was benched in Week 11 for throwing two interceptions and completing only nine passes on 16 attempts against the Toronto Argonauts. He was replaced by backup second-year quarterback Jake Maier. Maier continued to be the team's starting quarterback late into the season, and agreed to a contract extension, leaving Mitchell's future in Calgary in doubt. Mitchell came off the bench in the playoffs in relief of Maier, however, in the nine minutes that he played he was unable to lead the team to victory (although surpassing Meier's passing yardage in the game) ending the Stampeders season. Following the defeat, Mitchell conceded that "the writing is on the wall" and he was looking forward to a new opportunity elsewhere when his contract expired in February 2023.

Upon completion of his career in Calgary, Mitchell ranked number 1 in Stampeder history in regular season pass yards (32,541), pass attempts (3,866), pass completions (2,496), and victories as a starting quarterback (90). His 16 career playoff touchdown passes are a Stampeder record. He ranked number 1 in Stampeder history in Grey Cup pass yards (1,431), pass attempts (165), pass completions (116), and pass touchdowns (7).

=== Hamilton Tiger-Cats (2023–present) ===
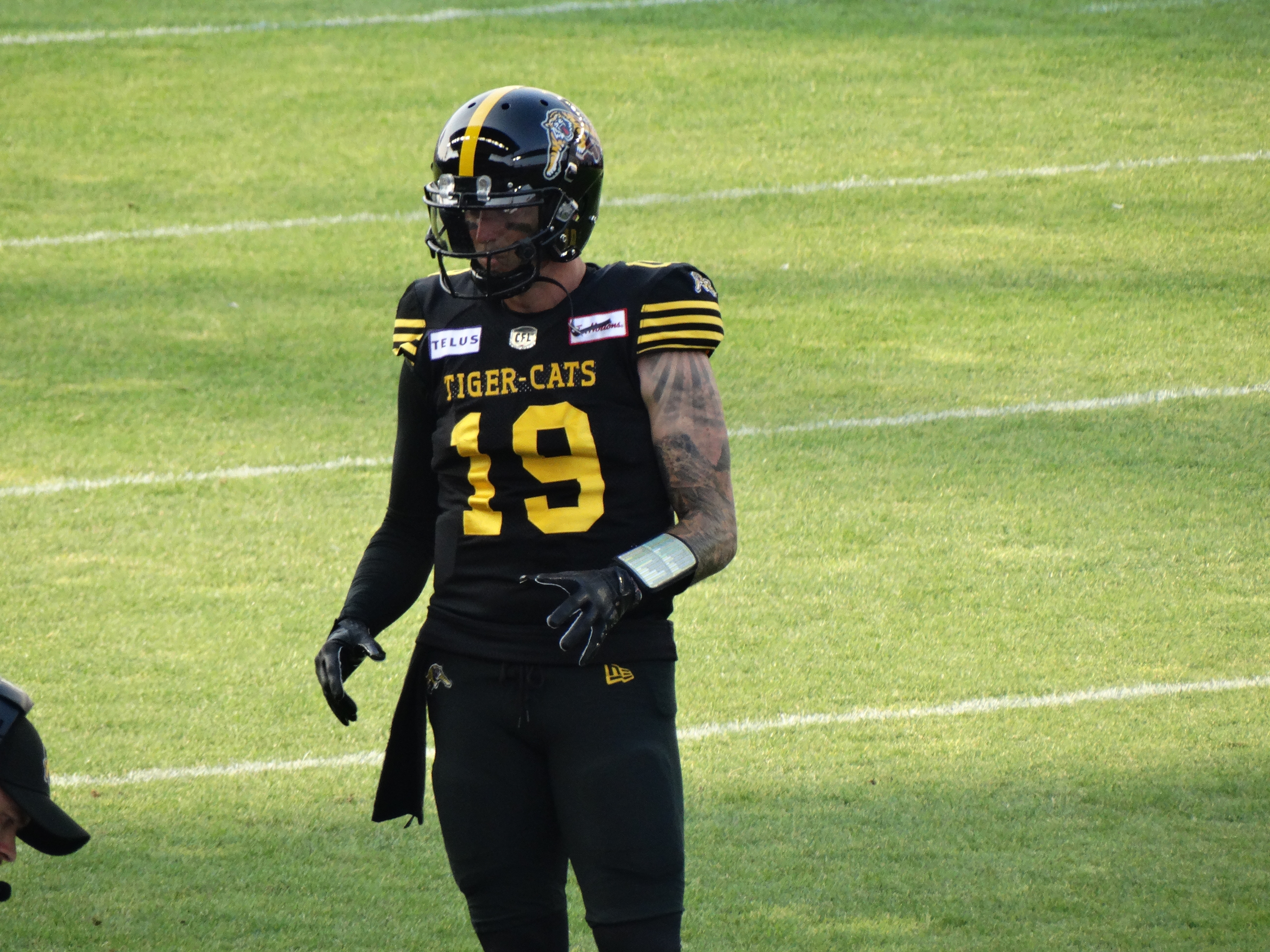
Mitchell with the Tiger-Cats in 2023

==== 2023 ====
On November 14, 2022, the Hamilton Tiger-Cats acquired the rights to Mitchell in exchange for two drafts picks and future considerations, with his contract set to expire in February 2023. A couple days later Mitchell went on record stating that he still intended to enter free agency. Nonetheless, on January 24, 2023, Mitchell signed a three-year contract worth over $500,000 CAD annually with the Tiger-Cats. He suffered a lower-body injury in the second half of the team's Week 2 loss to rival Toronto Argonauts. A few days later it was announced that Mitchell would miss the team's home-opener against the Montreal Alouettes in Week 3.

On June 23, 2023, Hamilton placed Mitchell on the six-game injured reserve list with an adductor injury. He returned in Week 8 in the win against the Ottawa Redblacks, but suffered a fracture in his lower right leg on the last play of the game and returned to the six-game injured list. He returned to play and start the last three games of the regular season, but split playing time with Matthew Shiltz or Taylor Powell in each game. In total, he played and started in six regular season games where he completed 78 out of 132 pass attempts for 1,031 yards with six touchdowns and ten interceptions. The 8–10 Tiger-Cats went on the road into Molson Stadium for the East Semi-Final against the Montreal Alouettes. Hamilton head coach Orlando Steinauer went with Shiltz as the starting quarterback for the playoff game, Mitchell only being put into the game late in the fourth quarter (Mitchell completing one pass in four attempts along with one interception in relief of Shiltz). The Alouettes won 27–12, and later went on to win the Grey Cup.

==== 2024: CFL passing yards leader ====
In December 2023, Scott Milanovich, who had been an offensive coach on Hamilton's staff in 2023, became the team's head coach, replacing Steinauer. The Tiger-Cats announced in early January 2024 that Mitchell had reworked his contract; he would remain under contract for the 2024 and 2025 seasons. The same month, Milanovich said that he expected Mitchell to be the starting quarterback for the 2024 season. Going into the season, Mitchell underwent a new fitness and nutrition regime to improve his performance. On the first day of rookie camp, he was spotted with a walking boot on his right leg, and was dealing with “swelling”. By May 13, he was participating at training camp without a walking boot on his leg.

In the team's ninth game, against Montreal, Mitchell threw a first quarter interception and was benched by Milanovich. Taylor Powell replaced Mitchell and threw for 319 yards and 2 touchdowns in relief, which earned him the start the following week against Edmonton. In the first quarter of the Edmonton game, Powell suffered a head injury, and was ultimately taken to hospital. Mitchell came on in relief, and started all of Hamilton's remaining games.

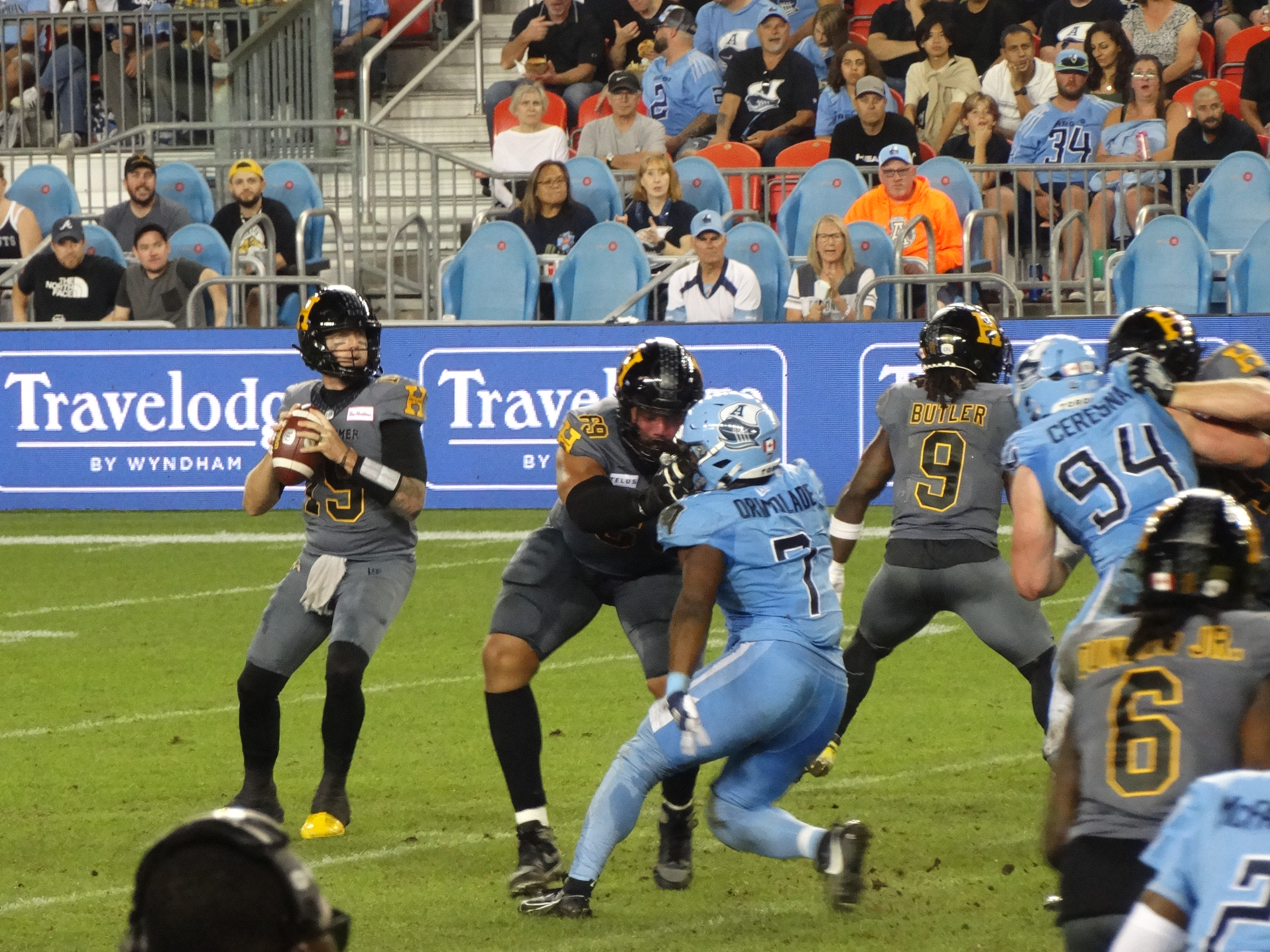
Mitchell in the pocket (2024)

Hamilton finished 7–11 and missed the playoffs. Despite this and Mitchell's early-season struggles, he had one of the best statistical seasons in his career. He set single season career highs in pass completions (420), attempts (614), and yards (5,451). He led the CFL in these categories, as well as touchdown passes (32). However, he also led the league in interceptions (18). His passing yards placed him 1,115 yards ahead of the second place quarterback in the CFL, Zach Collaros, and set a new single-season Tiger-Cat record. Mitchell also set Hamilton's single-season record for completions. He threw five touchdowns in a single game twice, and had ten 300-yard passing games, two of which surpassed 400 yards. Mitchell was Hamilton's unanimous selection for Most Outstanding Player.

Mitchell received the following accolades for his season accomplishments: Terry Evanshen Trophy winner as Most Outstanding Player in the East Division, and Divisional All-CFL quarterback for the East Division.

Upon completion of the season, Mitchell ranked 12th all-time in CFL regular season history in the following passing categories: yards (39,023), touchdowns (226); 9th in completions (2,994); 13th in attempts (4,612); tied for 10th in regular season victories for a starting quarterback (99).

==== 2025: Repeat as CFL passing yards leader ====
In the team's third game of the 2025 season, against the Montreal Alouettes, Mitchell earned his 100th win as a CFL starting quarterback. He became the fastest quarterback to do so, accomplishing the feat in 144 starts, which bettered Ron Lancaster's 100 wins in 149 starts. Mitchell's 100th win also moved him into a tie for ninth on the CFL all-time list with Matt Dunigan. On July 4, 2025, against the Toronto Argonauts, he surpassed 40,000 career passing yards in the team's 51–38 win, becoming the 11th player in league history to accomplish the feat. In the same game, he also threw five touchdowns for the third time in his career. On August 2, 2025, Mitchell passed Doug Flutie for ninth all-time in career passing yards.

Mitchell finished the 2025 season completing 428 of 626 passes (68.4%) for 5,296 yards, 36 touchdowns, and 11 interceptions. He led the CFL in completions, passing attempts, passing yards and passing touchdowns for the second straight season, setting career highs in completions, attempts, and passing touchdowns. He was also the Terry Evanshen Trophy winner and a CFL East All-Star for the second consecutive year. Hamilton finished the season in first place in the East Division with an 11–7 record, and lost in the East Final to the Alouettes by a score of 19–16. Mitchell, who was set to become a free agent, signed a two-year contract with the Tiger-Cats on December 11, 2025.

==== 2026 ====
Through the first four games of the 2026 season, Mitchell completed 78.2% of his passes for 1,107 yards, nine touchdowns, and one interception, including a five-passing-touchdown game for the fourth time in his career. During the fourth game of that stretch against the Blue Bombers on July 5, 2026, Mitchell was taken off the field in an ambulance in the third quarter after being sacked by Jake Ceresna. Mitchell had ankle surgery the next day, and was placed on the six-game injured list on July 8. On September 14, the Tiger-Cats confirmed that he would be out for the remainder of the 2026 season with the team holding a 4–9 record at the time. On September 29, 2026, Mitchell confirmed his intention to return for the 2027 season as there had been speculation that he could retire.

== Career statistics ==
Legend
	CFL's Most Outstanding Player
	Grey Cup MVP
	Won the Grey Cup
	Led the league
**Bold**	Career high

=== CFL ===
==== Regular season ====
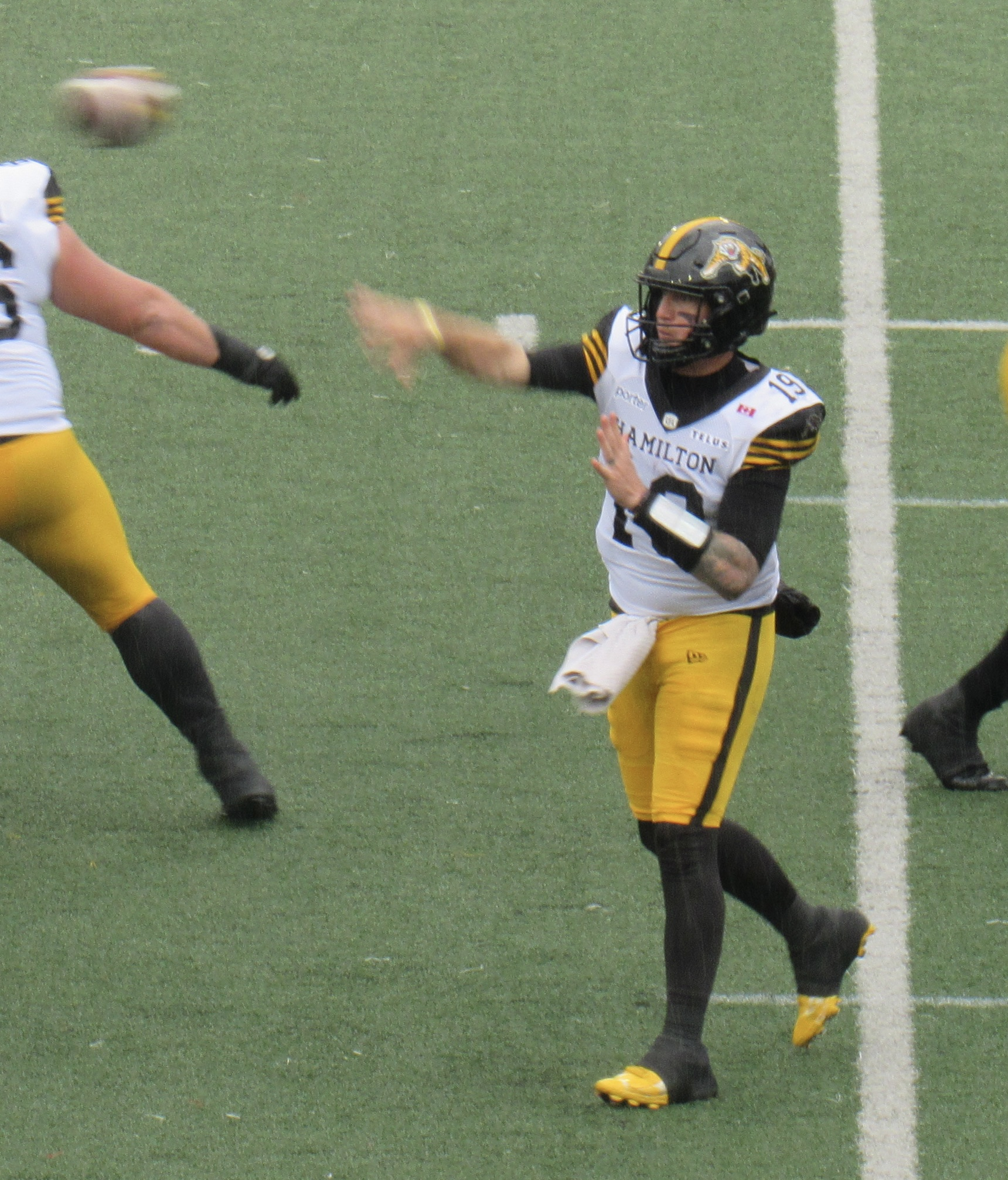
Mitchell in 2025

Year	Team	Games			Passing							Rushing				Fumbles	
Year	Team	GD	GS	Record	Cmp	Att	Pct	Yds	TD	Int	QBR	Att	Yds	Y/A	TD	Fum	Lost
2012	CGY	**18**	0	—	12	21	57.1	168	2	2	75.1	34	67	2.0	**5**	2	1
2013	CGY	**18**	3	3–0	94	135	69.6	1,156	10	3	111.2	**35**	151	4.3	2	4	1
2014	CGY	17	14	12–2	264	417	63.3	3,389	22	8	98.3	**35**	**232**	6.6	4	4	**2**
2015	CGY	**18**	17	13–4	364	555	65.6	4,551	26	13	96.8	19	88	4.6	3	2	**2**
2016	CGY	18	17	**15**–1–1	411	606	67.8	5,377	32	8	107.7	14	60	4.4	0	4	**2**
2017	CGY	**18**	17	13–3–1	349	546	63.9	4,700	23	11	96.9	3	17	5.7	0	1	0
2018	CGY	**18**	**18**	13–5	356	585	60.9	5,119	35	14	99.6	16	108	6.8	0	**5**	**2**
2019	CGY	11	11	8–3	274	415	66.0	3,464	19	11	96.1	2	4	2.0	0	2	**2**
2020	CGY	Season cancelled										Season cancelled					
2021	CGY	11	11	7–4	211	325	64.9	2,594	10	13	83.0	4	19	4.8	0	0	0
2022	CGY	**18**	9	6–3	160	261	61.3	2,010	9	6	87.2	7	26	3.7	0	0	0
2023	HAM	6	6	2–4	78	132	59.1	1,031	6	10	67.5	5	14	2.8	0	1	1
2024	HAM	**18**	17	7–10	420	614	68.4	**5,451**	32	**18**	101.2	16	124	**7.8**	0	3	1
2025	HAM	**18**	**18**	11–7	**428**	**626**	68.4	5,296	**36**	11	106.2	21	124	5.9	1	4	0
2026	HAM	4	4	2–2	86	110	**78.2**	1,107	9	1	**132.7**	1	15	**15.0**	0	0	0
Career		211	162	112–48–2	3,508	5,348	65.6	45,426	271	129	99.0	212	1,049	4.9	14	32	12

==== Playoffs ====
Year	Team	Games			Passing							Rushing				Fumbles	
Year	Team	GD	GS	Record	Cmp	Att	Pct	Yds	TD	Int	QBR	Att	Yds	Y/A	TD	Fum	Lost
2012	CGY	**2**	0	–	1	2	50.0	42	0	0	131.3	**8**	**13**	1.6	**3**	0	0
2013	CGY	1	0	–	1	3	33.3	6	0	0	38.2	1	5	**5.0**	0	0	0
2014	CGY	1	1	1–0	14	22	63.6	336	**4**	0	**179.4**	2	5	2.5	1	**1**	0
2015	CGY	**2**	**2**	1–1	**40**	**62**	64.5	**580**	**4**	1	109.6	3	9	3.0	0	0	0
2016	CGY	1	1	1–0	21	28	75.0	365	3	1	139.7	1	2	2.0	0	0	0
2017	CGY	1	1	1–0	20	32	62.5	228	1	0	94.3	0	0	0.0	0	0	0
2018	CGY	1	1	1–0	17	31	54.8	214	3	0	108.8	0	0	0.0	0	0	0
2019	CGY	1	1	0–1	12	28	42.9	116	1	**3**	22.3	0	0	0.0	0	0	0
2021	CGY	1	1	0–1	26	36	72.2	285	0	2	72.1	1	2	2.0	0	0	0
2022	CGY	1	0	–	8	11	72.7	147	0	0	118.4	0	0	0.0	0	0	0
2023	HAM	1	0	–	1	4	25.0	6	0	1	0.0	1	5	**5.0**	0	0	0
2025	HAM	1	1	0–1	29	36	**80.6**	269	1	1	98.0	0	0	0.0	0	0	0
Career		14	9	5–4	190	295	64.4	2,594	17	9	98.9	17	41	2.4	4	1	0

==== Grey Cup ====
Year	GC	Team	Opp.	Games			Passing							Rushing				Fumbles		Result
Year	GC	Team	Opp.	GD	GS	Record	Cmp	Att	Pct	Yds	TD	Int	Rtg	Att	Yds	Y/A	TD	Fum	Lost	Result
2012	100	CGY	TOR	1	0	—	6	9	66.7	80	1	0	**131.7**	0	0	0.0	0	0	0	L 35–22
2014	102	CGY	HAM	1	1	1–0	25	34	**73.5**	334	0	1	92.0	**4**	**19**	4.8	0	0	0	W 20–16
2016	104	CGY	OTT	1	1	0–1	28	41	68.3	**391**	**2**	**3**	84.5	1	0	0.0	0	**1**	0	L 39–33 (OT)
2017	105	CGY	TOR	1	1	0–1	**33**	**45**	73.3	373	**2**	1	103.3	0	0	0.0	0	0	0	L 27–24
2018	106	CGY	OTT	1	1	1–0	24	36	66.7	253	**2**	2	82.3	1	7	**7.0**	0	0	0	W 27–16
Career				5	4	2–2	116	165	70.3	1,431	7	7	93.3	6	26	4.3	0	1	0	

=== College ===
Season	Team	Games			Passing								Rushing			
Season	Team	GP	GS	Record	Cmp	Att	Pct	Yds	Y/A	TD	Int	Rtg	Att	Yds	Avg	TD
2008	SMU	12	12	1–11	236	410	57.6	2,865	7.0	24	23	124.4	51	−140	−2.7	1
2009	SMU	7	7	3–4	149	266	56.0	2,725	6.5	12	10	117.9	19	−64	−3.4	1
2010	EWU	15	14	12–2	300	505	59.4	3,496	6.9	37	15	135.8	58	47	0.8	0
2011	EWU	11	11	6–5	318	503	63.2	4,009	8.0	33	13	146.7	55	−5	−0.1	2
SMU totals		19	19	4–15	385	676	57.0	4,590	6.8	36	33	121.8	70	−204	−2.9	2
EWU totals		26	25	18–7	618	1,008	61.3	7,505	7.4	70	28	141.2	113	42	0.4	2
Career		45	44	22–22	1,003	1,684	60.0	12,095	7.2	106	61	133.4	183	−91	−0.5	4

== Personal life ==
Mitchell's brother, Cory Mitchell, also played football for the Eastern Washington Eagles from 2010 to 2014. Bo Levi Mitchell won the Stampeders' Herm Harrison Memorial Award for both the 2015 and 2016 seasons in recognition of his community service work.

== See also ==
- List of gridiron football quarterbacks passing statistics
