= Julan Lynch =

Canadian gridiron football player (born 1994)

No. 85
- Position: Wide receiver

Personal information
- Born: June 19, 1994 (age 32); Jamaica
- Listed height: 6 ft 1 in (1.85 m)
- Listed weight: 228 lb (103 kg)

Career information
- High school: Michael A. Riffel (Regina)
- University: Saskatchewan (2012–2016)
- CFL draft: 2017: 2nd round, 17th overall pick

Career history
- Calgary Stampeders (2017–2018)

Awards and highlights
- Grey Cup champion (2018)

Career CFL statistics
- Games played: 23
- Receptions: 5
- Receiving yards: 96
- Receiving average: 19.2
- Stats at CFL.ca

Julan Lynch (born June 19, 1994) is a Jamaican-Canadian former professional football wide receiver who played in the Canadian Football League (CFL) for the Calgary Stampeders. He played CIS football for the Saskatchewan Huskies.

== Early life ==
In the mid 2000s, Lynch's family moved from Jamaica to Canada. He played high school football at Michael A. Riffel High School in Regina, Saskatchewan.

== University career ==
Lynch played CIS football for the Saskatchewan Huskies from 2012 to 2016. In 2015, he had 50 receptions for 686 yards and four touchdowns. As a senior, Lynch caught 38 passes for 517 yards and two touchdowns.

== Professional career ==
Pre-draft measurables
Height	Weight	40-yard dash	10-yard split	20-yard split	20-yard shuttle	Three-cone drill	Vertical jump	Broad jump	Bench press
6 ft 2 1/8 in (1.88 m)	226 lb (103 kg)	4.69 s	1.64 s	2.74 s	4.59 s	7.56 s	34.5 in (0.88 m)	9 ft 11 in (3.02 m)	19 reps
All values from Pro Day

Lynch was selected by the Calgary Stampeders with the 17th overall pick in the second round of the 2017 CFL draft. He spent most of the season on the practice roster before he was elevated to the active roster on August 25. Lynch dressed in seven games his rookie season, catching two passes for 18 yards. The following season, he played in 16 games, where he had two receptions for 62 yards against the Toronto Argonauts. In the 106th Grey Cup, Lynch had one catch for 26 yards as the Stampeders defeated the Ottawa Redblacks, 27–16. On June 9, 2019, he was released by the team.
