= Roy Finch (gridiron football) =

American gridiron football player (born 1991)

No. 14
- Position: Running back

Personal information
- Born: October 1, 1991 (age 35); Niceville, Florida
- Listed height: 5 ft 7 in (1.70 m)
- Listed weight: 165 lb (75 kg)

Career information
- College: Oklahoma
- NFL draft: 2014: undrafted

Career history
- New England Patriots (2014)*; Ottawa Redblacks (2014); Calgary Stampeders (2016–2018)
- * Offseason or practice squad member only

Awards and highlights
- John Agro Special Teams Award (2017); CFL West All-Star (2017)
- Stats at CFL.ca

Roy Finch (born October 1, 1991) is a former professional American and Canadian football running back and return specialist. He was signed by the New England Patriots of the National Football League as an undrafted free agent in 2014. He played college football for the Oklahoma Sooners. He was also a member of the Ottawa Redblacks and Calgary Stampeders of the Canadian Football League (CFL).

== College career ==
Finch was recruited by several NCAA Division I football teams, and he chose Oklahoma over Alabama and Stanford.

During his four-year career with the Sooners, Finch ran for 1,412 yards with six touchdowns and caught 58 passes including two touchdowns. In his junior year against Kansas, Finch ran a kickoff back 100 yards for a touchdown, tying an Oklahoma record.

== Professional career ==
=== New England Patriots ===
After going undrafted in the 2014 NFL draft, Finch was signed to a three-year contract by the Patriots. He was, however, released by the Patriots prior to the start of the 2014 season.

=== Ottawa Redblacks ===
Following his release from the Patriots, Finch signed with the CFL's Ottawa Redblacks. During five games with the Redblacks, he carried the ball 24 times for 95 yards and had a 21.6-yard average on kick returns.

He was released by the Redblacks prior to the 2015 season.

=== Calgary Stampeders ===
After Finch sat out the 2015 season, during which he finished his degree at Oklahoma, he received a tryout with and was signed by the Stampeders for the 2016 season.

Finch became a fan favorite during his time with the Stampeders. In his first season with Calgary, Finch excelled as a kick returner, recording 71 punt returns for 993 yards and a touchdown and returning 43 kickoffs for 1,060 yards. In June 2017, Finch was suspended two games for violating the CFL's drug policy. During the 2017 season, Finch returned three kicks for touchdowns, tying a Calgary franchise record held by Derrick Crawford. He was named the CFL's top special teams player for the season. Finch was set to return for another season with the Stampeders, until plans to return were derailed by his arrest in spring 2018 in Edmond, Oklahoma. Finch announced in early May 2018, that he was putting his football career on hold indefinitely and he would not be reporting to the Stampeders 2018 training camp.

== Early and personal life ==
Finch grew up in Clinton, Maryland. He graduated from Niceville (FL) High School, though he attended Edmond North High School in Oklahoma for his sophomore year. He grew up a fan of the New England Patriots.

On April 16, 2018, it was announced that Finch had been arrested by police officers in Edmond, Oklahoma for allegedly assaulting a police officer the previous weekend. In late June 2019, criminal charges against Finch related to kidnapping and domestic abuse were dropped after a key witness failed to appear for a preliminary hearing.
