= Shaquille Richardson =

American gridiron football player (born 1992)

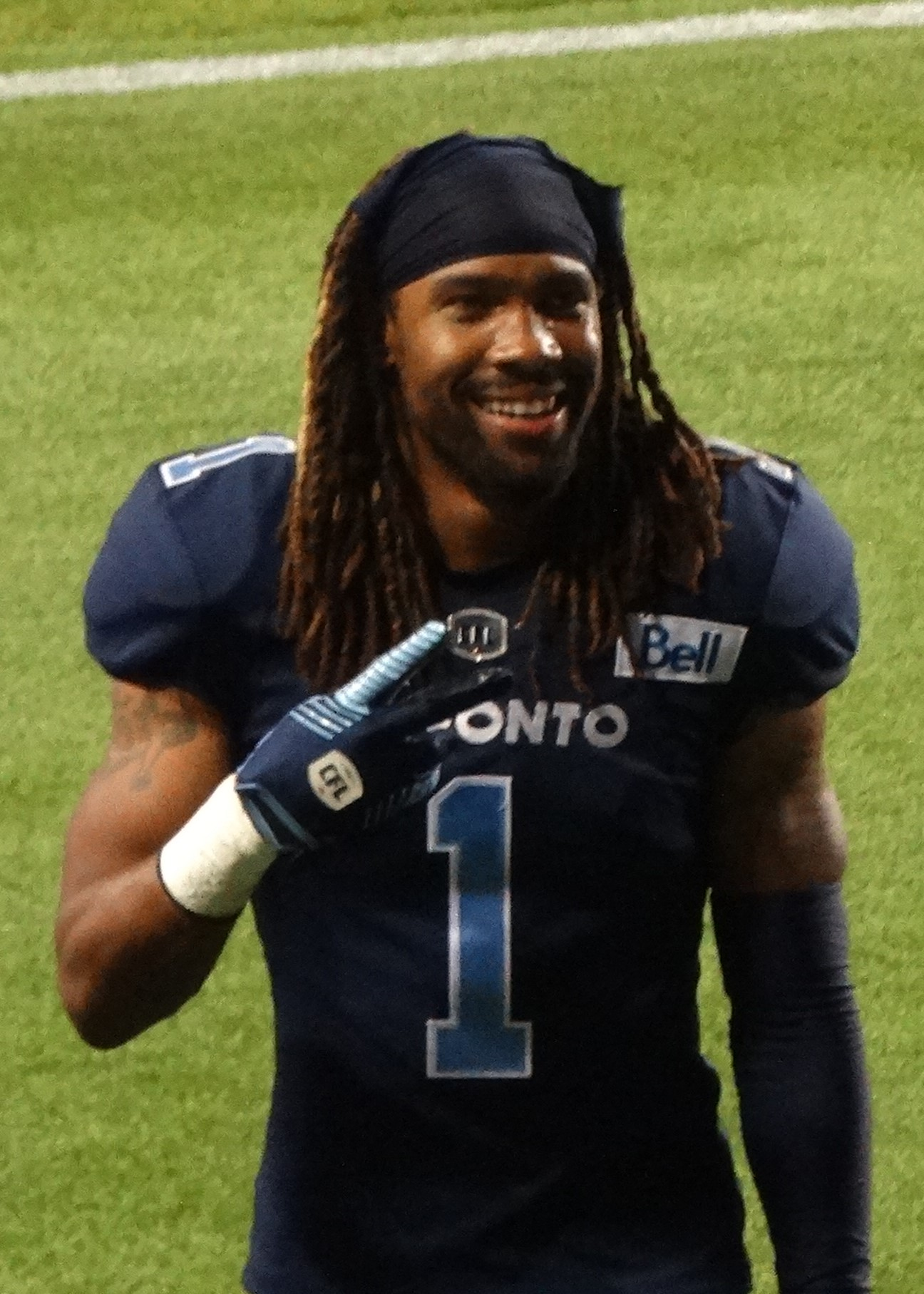
- Richardson with the Toronto Argonauts in 2021

No. 35, 1, 21
- Position: Defensive back

Personal information
- Born: March 21, 1992 (age 34); Compton, California, U.S.
- Listed height: 6 ft 0 in (1.83 m)
- Listed weight: 191 lb (87 kg)

Career information
- High school: Los Alamitos (Los Alamitos, California)
- College: Arizona
- NFL draft: 2014: 5th round, 157th overall pick

Career history
- Pittsburgh Steelers (2014)*; Kansas City Chiefs (2015)*; Winnipeg Blue Bombers (2015)*; Arizona Cardinals (2015)*; Calgary Stampeders (2015); Tennessee Titans (2015–2016)*; Carolina Panthers (2016)*; Calgary Stampeders (2016–2017); Oakland Raiders (2018)*; Arizona Hotshots (2019); Toronto Argonauts (2019–2022); Calgary Stampeders (2023)
- * Offseason or practice squad member only

Awards and highlights
- Grey Cup champion (2022); CFL East All-Star (2021)
- Stats at Pro Football Reference
- Stats at CFL.ca

Shaquille "Shaq" Nakeem Richardson (born March 21, 1992) is an American former professional football defensive back who played in the Canadian Football League (CFL) and Alliance of American Football (AAF). He was selected by the Pittsburgh Steelers in the fifth round of the 2014 NFL draft. He played college football at Arizona.

== Early life ==
Richardson attended Los Alamitos High School in Los Alamitos, California, where he was an All-Region selection. As a senior, he made 38 tackles and five interceptions on defense and 31 receptions for 540 yards and five touchdowns on offense.

Considered a three-star recruit by Rivals.com, he was rated as the 30th best cornerback prospect of his class.

== College career ==
Richardson originally enrolled in school at UCLA but upon being one of three freshman players dismissed by the team, along with his cousin Paul Richardson and Josh Shirley. After his dismissal, he chose to attend the University of Arizona from 2010 to 2013. In 2010, he played in all 13 games as a true freshman, starting three. In his first career start against Washington State, he intercepted two passes. He finished the season with 29 tackles, seven pass break-ups, one forced fumble and two picks. In 2011, he played in and started 10 games, recording 47 tackles, a team leading four interceptions (73 yards), five pass break-ups and one forced fumble. In 2012, he played in all 13 games with 11 starts. He recorded 58 total tackles, one interception and 14 pass break-ups. In 2013, he started all 13 games, recording 55 tackles, including three for loss, three interceptions and four pass break-ups.

== Professional career ==
Richardson was selected by the Pittsburgh Steelers in the fifth round (157th overall) of the 2014 NFL draft. He was cut from the Steelers 53-man roster prior to the start of the regular season but was then signed to their practice squad.

On February 26, 2015, Richardson signed a one-year deal with the Kansas City Chiefs. He was waived by the Chiefs on April 21.

Richardson signed with the Winnipeg Blue Bombers of the Canadian Football League (CFL) on May 27, 2015. He was released on June 20, 2015.

On July 31, 2015, Richardson was signed by the Arizona Cardinals. On August 31, 2015, he was cut by the Cardinals.

Richardson was signed by the CFL's Calgary Stampeders on October 6, 2015.

On November 17, 2015, Richardson was signed to the Tennessee Titans' practice squad.

On May 17, 2016, Richardson signed a 2-year, $960,000 contract with the Carolina Panthers. He was waived on July 14, 2016.

Richardson played in nine games, starting two, for the Stampeders in 2016. He then played in 18 games, all starts, in 2017.

On January 9, 2018, Richardson signed a reserve/future contract with the Oakland Raiders. He was waived/injured on August 6, 2018, and was placed on injured reserve. He was released on August 23, 2018.

Richardson later joined the Arizona Hotshots of the Alliance of American Football. He was placed on injured reserve on January 30, 2019. He was activated from injured reserve on March 6, 2019. The league ceased operations in April 2019.

In October 2019, Richardson was signed to the practice roster of the Toronto Argonauts of the CFL, and then later promoted to their active roster. He signed a contract extension with the Argonauts on January 14, 2021. In 2021, Richardson was named a CFL East Division all-star. He would also go on to win the 109th Grey Cup with the Argonauts during the 2022 CFL season. He became a free agent upon the expiry of his contract on February 14, 2023.

On August 16, 2023, Richardson signed with the Stampeders. He became a free agent upon the expiry of his contract on February 13, 2024.

== Personal life ==
Richardson's cousin is wide receiver Paul Richardson.
