= Charleston Hughes =

American football player (born 1983)

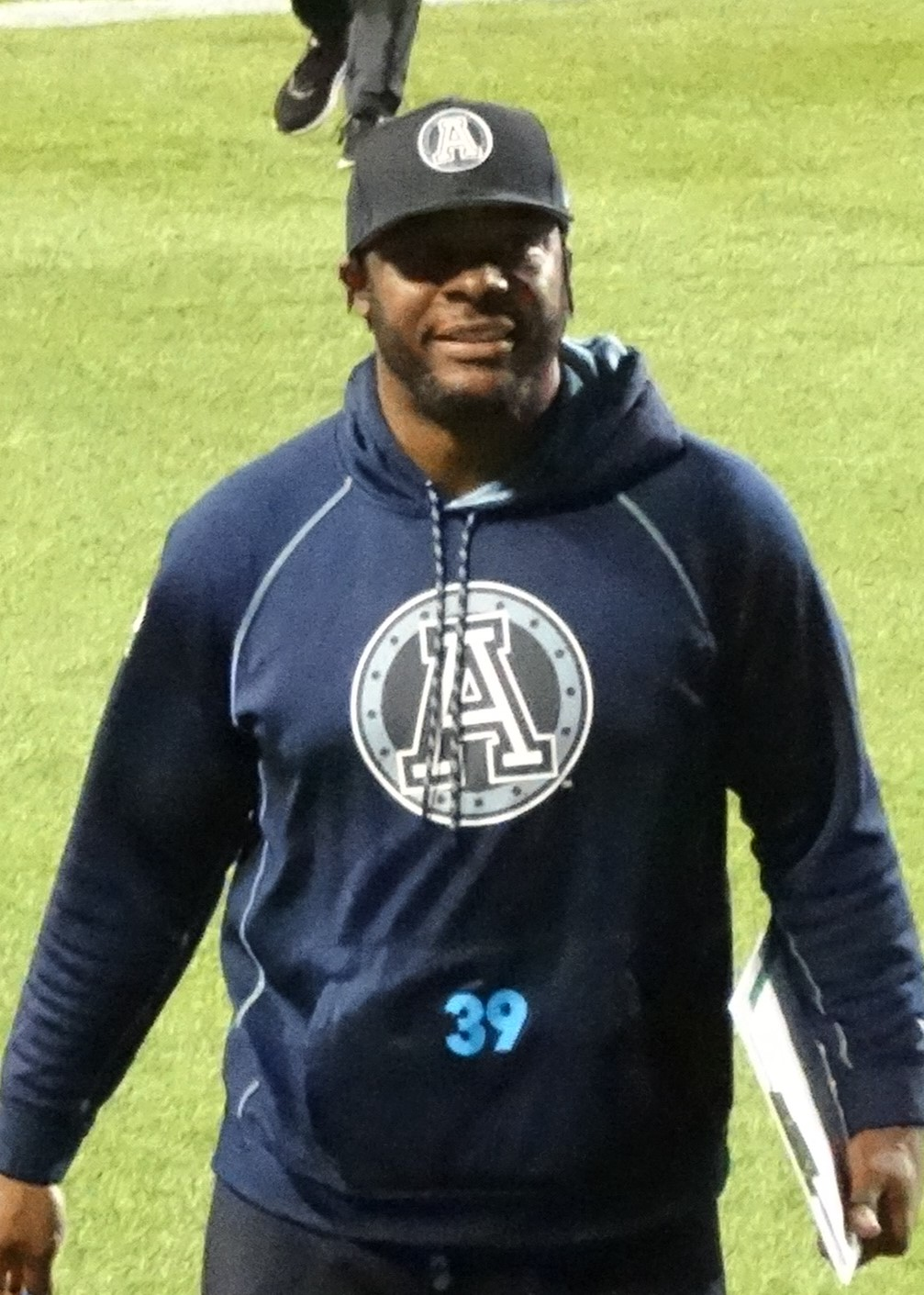
- Hughes with the Toronto Argonauts in 2021

No. 39
- Position: Defensive end

Personal information
- Born: December 14, 1983 (age 42); Saginaw, Michigan, U.S.
- Listed height: 6 ft 1 in (1.85 m)
- Listed weight: 246 lb (112 kg)

Career information
- High school: Saginaw
- College: Northwood

Career history
- 2008: Calgary Stampeders
- 2009: Philadelphia Eagles*
- 2009–2017: Calgary Stampeders
- 2018: Hamilton Tiger-Cats*
- 2018–2020: Saskatchewan Roughriders
- 2021: Toronto Argonauts
- 2022: Saskatchewan Roughriders
- * Offseason or practice squad member only

Awards and highlights
- 2× Grey Cup champion (2008, 2014); 6× CFL All-Star (2012, 2013, 2016, 2017, 2018, 2019); 8× CFL West All-Star (2010, 2012, 2013, 2015, 2016, 2017, 2018, 2019); 5× CFL sack leader (2013, 2016, 2017, 2018, 2019); Norm Fieldgate Trophy (2013); 2× First-team All-GLIAC (2005–2006); Second-team All-GLIAC (2003)

Career CFL statistics
- Games played: 202
- Defensive tackles: 526
- Sacks: 136
- Interceptions: 3
- Forced Fumbles: 33
- Stats at CFL.ca
- Canadian Football Hall of Fame (Class of 2026)

Charleston Hughes (born December 14, 1983) is an American former professional football player who was a defensive end in the Canadian Football League (CFL) from 2008 to 2022. He was signed by the Calgary Stampeders as a street free agent in 2008 and won two Grey Cup championships over his ten-year tenure with the club (in 2008 and 2014). He is a six-time CFL All-Star and eight-time division All-Star. He was also named the West Division's Most Outstanding Defensive Player in 2013. He played college football for the Northwood Timberwolves. Hughes was also a member of the Philadelphia Eagles of the National Football League (NFL), and the Hamilton Tiger-Cats. Saskatchewan Roughriders, and Toronto Argonauts of the CFL.

== Professional career ==
=== Calgary Stampeders (first stint) ===
Hughes joined the Stamps for the 2008 CFL season. He played in 15 of the 18 regular season games and recorded a career high 66 tackles. The Stampeders won the 96th Grey Cup against the Montreal Alouettes on November 23, 2008.

=== Philadelphia Eagles ===
Following a successful rookie year in the CFL, Hughes joined the Philadelphia Eagles of the National Football League on January 27, 2009. He was released on September 1, 2009 before playing any regular season games.

=== Calgary Stampeders (second stint) ===
He returned to the CFL midway through the 2009 CFL season. Hughes finished the 2012 season ranked second in sacks with 11, trailing only Keron Williams who had 12. Hughes led the CFL in sacks for the 2013 season with 18, one shy of the franchise record of 19 set by Harold Hallman in 1986. In 2016, for the second time in his career, Hughes finished the season with the most sacks, this time with 16. For his efforts, he was named a CFL All-Star for the third time in his career and was his team's nominee for Most Outstanding Defensive Player award for a third time. Following the 2016 season Hughes and the Stamps agreed to a contract extension, keeping him with the club through the 2018 season. Hughes had another productive season in 2017 accumulating 11 quarterback sacks, earning his fourth CFL All-Star award in the process. At the end of the 2017 season Hughes' 99 sacks tied him with Will Johnson for the most sacks in Stampeders franchise history.

=== Saskatchewan Roughriders (first stint) ===
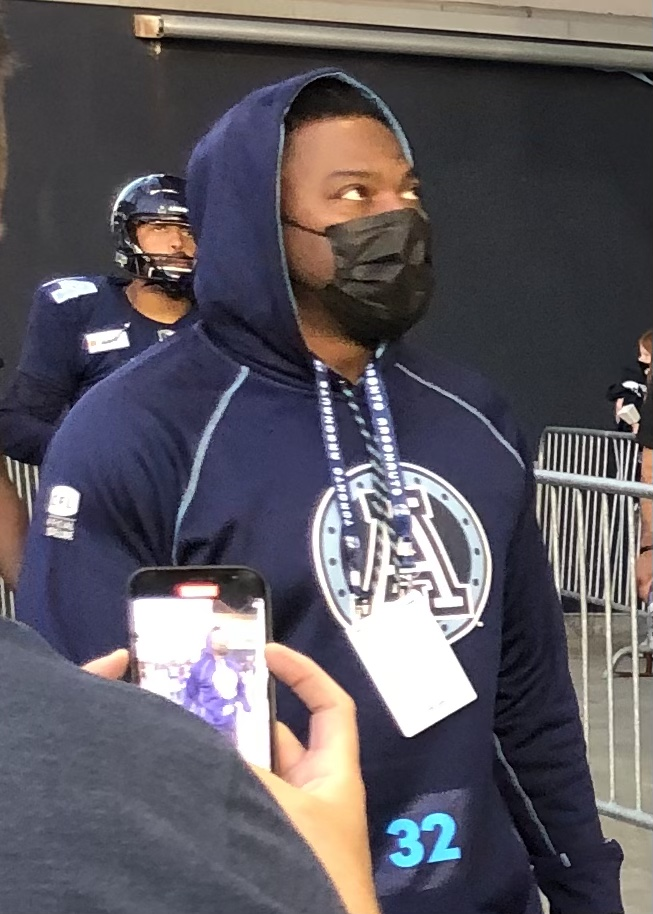
Hughes with the Argonauts in 2021

On February 2, 2018, Hughes was traded to the Hamilton Tiger-Cats in exchange for draft pick positioning. However, he was traded later that day to the Saskatchewan Roughriders for quarterback Vernon Adams Jr. Hughes was charged with impaired driving on October 11, 2018, with a court date set for October 31, 2018. Following the incident the Riders suspended Hughes for the team's critical Week 19 match against the Calgary Stampeders and fined him with the maximum disciplinary fine allowed under the CBA. He finished the season having played in 17 games and contributing 35 tackles and 15 sacks. Hughes had an outstanding season with the Riders in 2019, and was named a CFL Top Performer for the months of July and September. He did not play in 2020 due to the cancellation of the 2020 CFL season and, as a pending 2021 free agent, he was released by the Roughriders on February 3, 2021.

=== Toronto Argonauts ===
On February 4, 2021, Hughes signed with the Toronto Argonauts to a two-year contract. He played in nine games where he had 18 defensive tackles and two sacks and was released on December 27, 2021.

=== Saskatchewan Roughriders (second stint) ===
On May 10, 2022, it was announced that Hughes had re-signed with the Roughriders. On February 14, 2023, Hughes became a free agent.

=== Retirement and Legacy ===
Hughes announced his retirement from the CFL in a social media post on December 29, 2023.

On July 8, 2026, Hughes was announced as an inductee into the Canadian Football Hall of Fame. The induction news was shared with Hughes on a personal phone call from former Stampeders teammate Corey Mace.

== Statistics ==
		Defence
Year	Team	GP	GS	DT	STT	QS	PKD	Int	FF	FR	TD
2008	CGY	16	15	66	5	5	5	0	1	2	0
2009	CGY	8	0	24	12	6	2	0	1	0	0
2010	CGY	15	12	35	8	7	3	0	2	0	0
2011	CGY	16	16	40	6	7	4	1	2	1	1
2012	CGY	18	18	53	6	11	3	1	5	0	0
2013	CGY	16	16	39	0	18	3	1	3	0	0
2014	CGY	11	11	28	1	8	3	0	3	0	0
2015	CGY	15	15	39	0	10	2	0	2	1	0
2016	CGY	18	18	47	0	16	1	0	3	0	0
2017	CGY	14	14	41	0	11	0	0	1	1	0
2018	SSK	17	17	35	0	15	4	0	3	2	1
2019	SSK	17	17	50	0	16	0	0	4	2	1
2020	SSK	Season cancelled
2021	TOR	9	9	18	1	2	3	0	0	1	0
2022	SSK	12	8	11	0	4	0	0	3	3	0
CFL totals		202	186	526	39	136	33	3	33	13	3
