= Marken Michel =

American gridiron football player (born 1993)

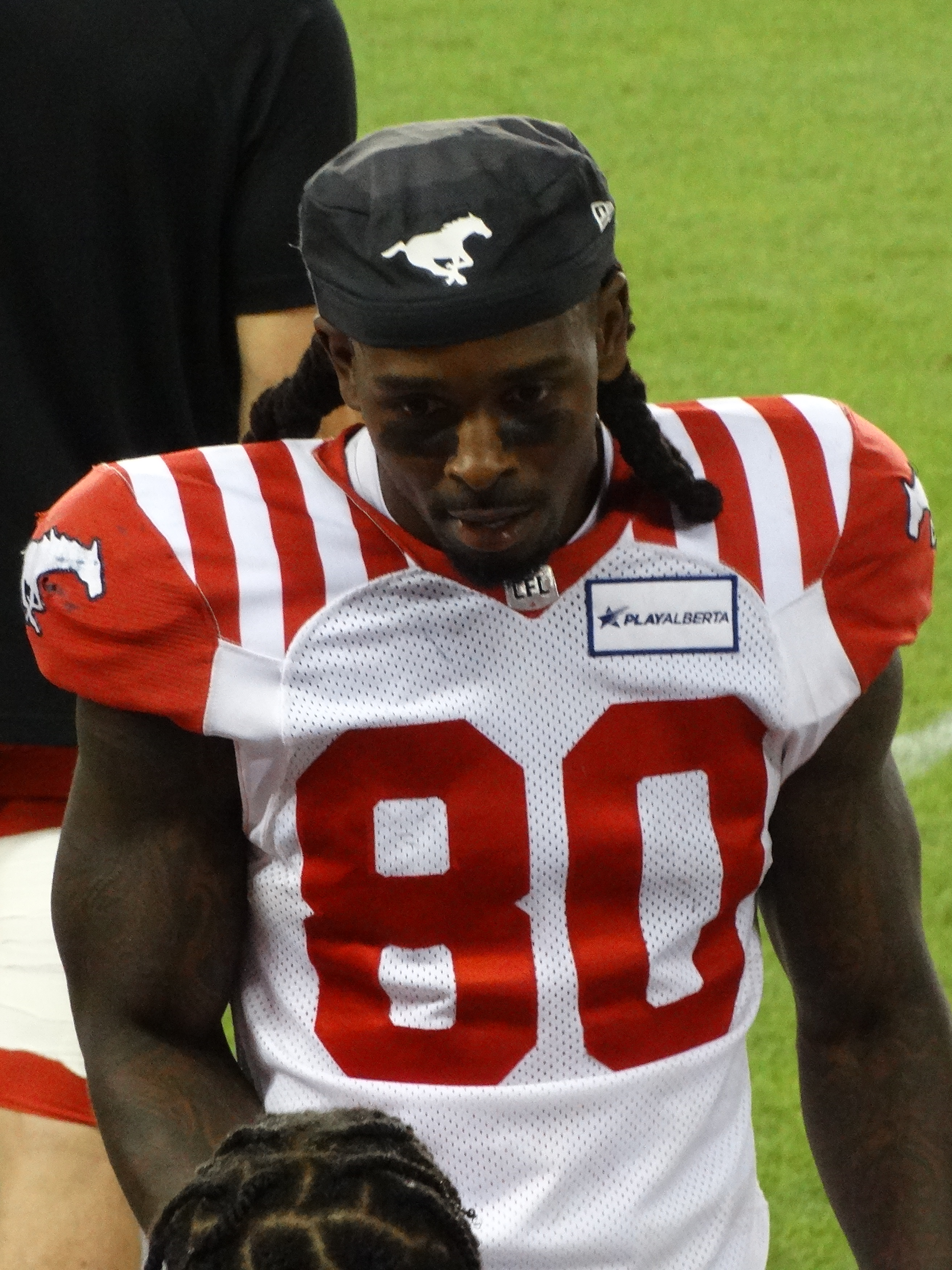
- Michel with the Calgary Stampeders in 2024

Profile
- Position: Wide receiver

Personal information
- Born: July 6, 1993 (age 33); Orlando, Florida, U.S.
- Listed height: 5 ft 11 in (1.80 m)
- Listed weight: 191 lb (87 kg)

Career information
- High school: American Heritage School (Plantation, Florida)
- College: UMass (2011–2015)
- NFL draft: 2016: undrafted

Career history
- Minnesota Vikings (2016)*; Calgary Stampeders (2016–2018); Philadelphia Eagles (2019–2020)*; Carolina Panthers (2020); Philadelphia Eagles (2021)*; Washington Football Team / Commanders (2021–2022)*; Calgary Stampeders (2023–2024)
- * Offseason or practice squad member only

Awards and highlights
- Grey Cup champion (2018); Jackie Parker Trophy (2017)

Career NFL statistics
- Games played: 2
- Stats at Pro Football Reference

Career CFL statistics
- Games played: 58
- Receptions: 188
- Receiving yards: 2,699
- Touchdowns: 17
- Stats at CFL.ca

Marken Michel (born July 6, 1993) is an American professional football wide receiver. He most recently played for the Calgary Stampeders of the Canadian Football League (CFL). He played college football at UMass before signing with the Minnesota Vikings as an undrafted free agent in 2016. Michel has also been a member of the Philadelphia Eagles, Carolina Panthers and Washington Football Team / Commanders of the NFL.

== Early life and college ==
Michel played receiver and safety at American Heritage High School in Plantation, Florida. He made 27 catches for 607 yards and eight touchdowns during his senior season. Michel played four seasons for the UMass Minutemen, where he had 92 catches for 1,016 yards and 6 touchdowns in addition to 28 carries for 162 yards and 2 touchdowns.

== Professional career ==
Pre-draft measurables
Height	Weight	Arm length	Hand span	40-yard dash	10-yard split	20-yard split	20-yard shuttle	Three-cone drill	Vertical jump	Broad jump	Bench press
5 ft 10 5/8 in (1.79 m)	193 lb (88 kg)	33 3/8 in (0.85 m)	9 3/4 in (0.25 m)	4.57 s	1.56 s	2.63 s	4.29 s	7.17 s	35.5 in (0.90 m)	10 ft 5 in (3.18 m)	25 reps

=== Minnesota Vikings ===
Michel signed with the Minnesota Vikings of the National Football League as an undrafted free agent on May 6, 2016. He was waived on August 30, 2016.

=== Calgary Stampeders (first stint) ===
Michel signed as a free agent with the Calgary Stampeders of the Canadian Football League (CFL) on May 17, 2017. He was nominated as the CFL West Division Rookie of the Year in 2017 after 780 yards receiving and 3 touchdowns in just 13 games played. Michel played in 11 regular season games for the Stampeders, catching 31 passes for the 435 yards with 5 touchdowns. On October 12, 2018, Michel was placed on the six-game injured reserve with a broken scapula.

=== Philadelphia Eagles (first stint) ===
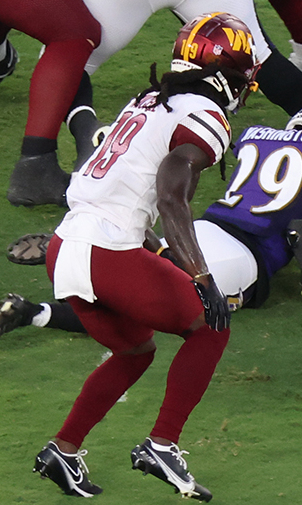
Michel with the Washington Commanders in 2022

On January 10, 2019, Michel signed with the Philadelphia Eagles of the National Football League. He was waived during final roster cuts on August 30, 2019. He was re-signed to the practice squad on December 5, 2019. He signed a reserve/future contract with the Eagles on January 6, 2020. He was waived on April 30, 2020.

=== Carolina Panthers ===
On August 16, 2020, Michel signed with the Carolina Panthers. He was waived during final roster cuts on September 5, 2020, and signed to the practice squad the next day. He was elevated to the active roster on October 24, October 29, November 7, and December 12 for the team's weeks 7, 8, 9, and 14 games against the New Orleans Saints, Atlanta Falcons, Kansas City Chiefs, and Denver Broncos, and reverted to the practice squad after each game. He signed a reserve/future contract with the Panthers on January 4, 2021. He was waived on August 9, 2021.

=== Philadelphia Eagles (second stint) ===
Michel was claimed off waivers by the Eagles on August 10, 2021, but was waived on August 29, 2021.

=== Washington Football Team / Commanders ===
Michel signed with the practice squad of the Washington Football Team on September 17, 2021. On January 10, 2022, he signed a reserve/future contract after the 2021 regular season ended. Michel was waived by the Commanders on August 30, 2022, and signed to the practice squad the next day.

=== Calgary Stampeders (second stint) ===
On July 2, 2023, it was announced that Michel had signed again with the Stampeders. He became a free agent upon the expiry of his contract on February 11, 2025.

== Personal life ==
His brother, Sony Michel, was drafted by the New England Patriots in the first round of the 2018 NFL draft.
