= 2017 CFL season =

Canadian Football League season

- Duration: June 22 – November 4, 2017
- East champions: Toronto Argonauts
- West champions: Calgary Stampeders

105th Grey Cup
- Date: November 26, 2017
- Venue: TD Place Stadium, Ottawa
- Champions: Toronto Argonauts

CFL seasons
- ← 2016 2018 →

Locations of the active CFL teams West East

The 2017 CFL season was the 64th season of modern-day Canadian football. Officially, it was the 60th season of the Canadian Football League. The regular season began on June 22 and concluded on November 4. The playoffs commenced on November 12 and concluded on November 26 with the Toronto Argonauts defeating the Calgary Stampeders to win the 105th Grey Cup.

== CFL news in 2017 ==
=== Salary cap ===
According to the new collective bargaining agreement, the 2017 salary cap was set at $5,150,000 (average $111,956 per active roster spot). As per the agreement, the cap was fixed did not vary with league revenue performance. The base individual minimum salary was set at $53,000.

=== Free agency ===
The 2017 free agency period began on Tuesday, February 14, 2017, at 12pm EST. All players eligible for free agency are unrestricted free agents, as is customary in the league.

=== CFL Week ===
CFL Week 2017 logo.

The league announced on November 15, 2016, that Regina, Saskatchewan, would be host to the first ever CFL Week (branded as Mark's CFL Week), an event designed to engage fans and the media during the off-season. The event took place from March 20 to March 26, 2017 at Evraz Place. The week started with the Western Regional Combine, which Edmonton had hosted the past four years. The CFL National Combine took place from March 23 to March 25, showcasing 2017 CFL draft-eligible prospects. The 2017 Canadian Football Hall of Fame inductees were announced during this week and the CFL and TSN photo shoot also took place here. There was also an interactive Fan Festival, a head coach and general manager media event, and the CFL Rules and Competition Committee meetings, which normally take place in February. The CFL also invited football teams from U Sports' Canada West Universities Athletic Association in a skeleton football tournament as part of a football showcase. This was the first CFL Combine held outside of Toronto.

=== Season schedule ===
On February 7, 2017, the CFL released the 2017 season schedule with the Saskatchewan Roughriders visiting the Montreal Alouettes on June 22. The Alouettes most recently hosted the season-opening game in 2015. For the fourth consecutive season, week 1 featured a Grey Cup rematch, with the defending champion Ottawa Redblacks hosting the Calgary Stampeders. Those two teams also met in week 2 in Calgary in an extended rematch. Including that home-and-home series, there were five played in the season with Saskatchewan and Calgary playing in two each and the Hamilton Tiger-Cats having none. For the first time since Ottawa rejoined the league in 2014, all pre-season games were played against divisional opponents. Additionally, for the first time since the league expanded to an 81-game schedule in 2014, a team other than Toronto played two games in one week, with the Redblacks playing two games in week 5.

There were 19 double headers, with nine on Fridays, nine on Saturdays, and one on Labour Day Monday, with the Ontario Labour Day game being played in prime time for the second consecutive year. There were four instances of overlaps for the Friday games as those nights featured games with 2.5 hours of start-time difference as opposed to the usual three hour difference. Those numbers do not include the triple header which was featured for the second consecutive year, although this time it occurred in week 12 on the Saturday before the 2017 NFL season week one Sunday games were played. For the second time in three years, there was only one game played on Thanksgiving Monday, with Montreal maintaining its customary hosting. This was the third straight season to showcase Thursday Night Football with the first 11 weeks featuring Thursday night games, although the hosting distribution was not as equal as it was in the previous year. The Montreal Alouettes hosted four Thursday night games, Winnipeg hosted three, Ottawa Redblacks hosted two, while two teams (Toronto and Calgary) hosted once and three teams (Hamilton, Saskatchewan, and BC) did not host any.

=== Hall of Fame ===
The Canadian Football Hall of Fame game took place on September 15, 2017, featuring the Hamilton Tiger-Cats hosting the Saskatchewan Roughriders. Kelvin Anderson, Anthony Calvillo, Mike O'Shea, and Geroy Simon were inducted as players while Stan Schwartz and Brian Towriss joined as builders. O'Shea is the currently the head coach of the Winnipeg Blue Bombers, whose team had a bye that week, and he also played four seasons with the Tiger-Cats. Calvillo is the quarterbacks coach for the Alouettes, whose team played two days after the Hall of Fame game, and he also played for three years with the Tiger-Cats. Simon spent one year with the Roughriders and won the Grey Cup with the team that one year.

=== Saskatchewan Roughriders new stadium ===
After spending 95 years at the site of their old stadium, Mosaic Stadium at Taylor Field, the Saskatchewan Roughriders moved into a brand new facility, also called Mosaic Stadium, for the 2017 season. The stadium has a fixed seating capacity of approximately 33,000 that is expandable to 40,000 for special events like the Grey Cup. The design of the stadium was unveiled on May 22, 2014, with the official groundbreaking ceremony being held on June 16, 2014. Mosaic Stadium was declared "substantially completed" on August 31, 2016 and a test event featuring a football game between the Regina Rams and Saskatchewan Huskies was held on October 1, 2016. The stadium was built for approximately $278 million with the city of Regina providing $73 million, the Saskatchewan provincial government providing a grant of $80 million and a loan of $100 million, and the Roughriders paying the rest. Unlike stadium delays in Winnipeg and Hamilton, Saskatchewan opened their new stadium on time, hosting the Bombers in the second week of the season.

=== Broadcasting changes ===
In mid-June 2017 the CFL announced a new international streaming service branded as CFL International. The new service expanded coverage around the world to new markets including mainland Europe, Asia and Africa, totaling over 130 new countries. TSN retained the CFL broadcast rights in Canada, BT Sports in the United Kingdom, ESPN in the United States, South America, Australia and portions of both Southeast Asia and Africa. Provided in partnership with Yare Media Group Inc the service offered multiple package options: Single game pass ($2.99 US), team pass ($36.99 US) and league pass ($79.99 US).

=== Commissioner change ===
On April 12, 2017 the Board of Governors and Jeffrey Orridge agreed to part ways, effective June 30, 2017. Orridge had been the commissioner of the league since April 2015 after taking over from Mark Cohon who served for eight years from 2007 though 2014. On June 15, 2017 the CFL announced that June 15 would be Orridge's last day in office, two weeks earlier than agreed upon back in April. Jim Lawson, the league's Chairman of the Board of Governors, assumed the duties of commissioner until a suitable replacement was found. On July 4, 2017, former CFL offensive lineman Randy Ambrosie assumed the position of commissioner. Having spent 9 seasons playing with the Calgary Stampeders, Toronto Argonauts and Edmonton Eskimos from 1985–1993, Ambrosie is the first commissioner to have played in the league since Larry Smith left the position in 1996.

=== Front office changes ===
Team	2016 GM	2017 GM
Montreal Alouettes	Jim Popp	Kavis Reed
Toronto Argonauts	Jim Barker	Jim Popp
Edmonton Eskimos	Ed Hervey	Brock Sunderland

On November 7, 2016, the Montreal Alouettes released their 21-year general manager and sometime Vice President and head coach Jim Popp after two disappointing seasons in a row. Popp joined the then brand-new Baltimore Stallions organization in 1994, and contributed to the revived Montreal team's current three Grey Cup championships and eight East Division titles over his tenure as general manager (as well as an additional Grey Cup and one South Division title in Baltimore); Popp was the last major legacy contributor from the CFL's American expansion of the 1990s. On December 14, 2016, the Alouettes held a press conference to announce Patrick Boivin as President and CEO and Kavis Reed as general manager. Reed had been the special teams coordinator with the Als for the previous two seasons, and has been coaching in the CFL since 2001.

After six seasons as the general manager of the Argonauts and compiling a 49–59 record in that time span, Jim Barker was fired on January 24, 2017. On February 28, 2017 the Argos announced Jim Popp as their new general manager. Popp had been the GM of the Montreal Alouettes since the mid-1990s and led the team to three Grey Cup championships.

On April 7, 2017 the Eskimos held a press conference to announce the firing of general manager Ed Hervey. The decision was made in large part because of a contract dispute and philosophical differences regarding increasing the media and fan accessibility of the team. Hervey had been the GM since the 2013 CFL season, and had led the team to a record of 40–32 (3–2 in playoffs) during that time, including winning the 103rd Grey Cup. On April 25, 2017 the Eskimos named 37-year old Brock Sunderland as their new GM. Sunderland had been the assistant GM of the Ottawa Redblacks since their inaugural season in 2014.

=== Coaching changes ===
Team	2016 HC	2016 interim HC	2017 HC	2017 interim HC
Montreal Alouettes	Jim Popp	Jacques Chapdelaine		Kavis Reed
Toronto Argonauts	Scott Milanovich		Marc Trestman	
Hamilton Tiger-Cats	Kent Austin			June Jones

On December 14, 2016, the Montreal Alouettes announced that Jacques Chapdelaine would stay on as the team's head coach. Chapdelaine had served as the interim head coach for the final six games of the previous season. However, after a 3–8 start to the season the Alouettes announced that they had dismissed Chapdelaine and defensive coordinator Noel Thorpe. General Manager Kavis Reed will serve as the interim head coach until the end of the season. Reed was the head-coach of the Edmonton Eskimos for three seasons (2011–2013), winning 22 games, and losing 32 (1–2 in the playoffs).

On January 27, 2017, Scott Milanovich resigned from his position as the head coach of the Toronto Argonauts; and later that day became the quarterbacks coach for the Jacksonville Jaguars of the NFL. Scott Milanovich had been the head coach of the Argos for five seasons starting in 2012, leading the club to a record of 43–47 during his tenure. Milanovich guided the Argos to victory in the 100th Grey Cup, his first season as head coach. On February 28, 2017 the Argos announced Marc Trestman as their new head coach. Trestman was the head coach of the Montreal Alouettes from 2008 through 2012, with a record of 59–31, guiding the Als to back-to-back Grey Cup titles in 2009 and 2010.

On August 24, 2017, midway through the 2017 season, Kent Austin stepped down as the head coach of the Hamilton Tiger-Cats (remaining with the team as vice president of football operations), and named June Jones his successor. Austin was in his fifth season as the Ti-Cats head coach, but started the season 0–8. During his tenure the Hamilton the Tiger-Cats won 36 games and lost 44, they also lost in consecutive Grey Cups (2013 & 2014). Jones had only been with the Ti-Cats for a little over three weeks at the time of his appointment to head coach, and his only other CFL coaching experience was with the Ottawa Rough Riders as their offensive coordinator in 1986. Nevertheless, he has extensive experience coaching in the NFL and various American collegiate levels.

=== NFL–CFL Officiating Development Program ===
On May 16, 2017, the CFL announced it would be renewing and expanding the officiating partnership as it enters into its second year of existence. Six NFL officials (two more than in 2016) worked as part of CFL crews during CFL preseason and regular-season games in June and July, prior to the start of the NFL season. Additionally, six CFL officials (three more than in 2016) attended the NFL's Officiating Development Program.

=== Rules changes ===
In March the CFL's Rules Committee submitted a variety of rule changes to the Board of Governors, to be implemented for the 2017 season. The proposed changes focus on improving game flow and increasing player safety. The proposals will be reviewed by the CFL's Board of Governors.

==== Proposed changes ====
- Coaches would no longer be allowed to challenge a play following a TV commercial timeout. The coach would have to throw his challenge flag within the first 30 seconds of the TV break.
- Limiting the types of actions which coaches can challenge with regards to "roughing the passer" penalties and hits on quarterbacks when they are running with the ball.
- Change all 10-yard illegal low block penalties to 15-yard unnecessary roughness penalties.
- Prevent the return team on a kicking play from putting a player on the field a split second prior to the snap and trying to hide him so he can receive a lateral pass from the kick returner. This sort of play would be subject to a 10-yard penalty.
- Increasing the duties of the video official in the Command Centre so they can correct errors when:
  - A flag has been thrown for a line of scrimmage penalty (offside or procedure)
  - A flag has been thrown for an unnecessary roughness penalty following a play and the video official sees other unnecessary roughness infractions
  - A call for illegal contact on a receiver should be changed to defensive pass interference because the ball had been thrown
- The replay official can only a change a call where there is clear and indisputable evidence that it is wrong, rather than attempt to officiate plays to ensure they are correct.
- TSN will go to commercial on every challenge it can. It is estimated that 80% of challenges will now be done during a commercial, up from 20% last season.
- Retaining the mid-season rule change from last season in which if a team makes its first coach's challenge of the game and does not win that challenge, the team losses a timeout.

==== Mid-season rule changes ====
- On August 2, 2017, new Commissioner Randy Ambrosie announced that coaches would only be able to challenge once per game, instead of twice. This change came in response to the fans growing displeasure over the frequency and inconsistency of coaches challenges. The hope is that by only being able to challenge once per game teams will have to save their challenge for more egregious mistakes.
- On September 13, 2017, the CFL and CFLPA made two major announcements to address player safety. The first being the immediate end of fully padded-practices during the season. Under the previous rules each team was allowed to have 17 padded practices over the course of the season. Secondly, it was announced that starting in 2018, seasons would now be 21 weeks in length, one week longer than the 2017 season. This will allow more time between games for players to recover, and help alleviate scheduling issues in a nine-team league.

=== Marketing ===
On May 7, the league launched its "Bring It In / Tous Ensemble" ad campaign, designed to diversify its fan base and attract more women and younger fans. On August 13, the league launched a suite of T-shirts with the moniker "Diversity is Strength / Diversité est synonyme de Force" in response to the riots in Charlottesville, Virginia. The backs of the shirts had the last names of dozens of former and present CFL players from varying ethnic backgrounds. The shirts were originally planned to have been released in the fall, with the league moving the launch up to respond to the events in Charlottesville.

== Regular season ==
=== Structure ===
Teams played eighteen regular season games, playing two divisional opponents three times and all of the other teams twice. Teams were awarded two points for a win and one point for a tie. The top three teams in each division qualified for the playoffs, with the first place team gaining a bye to the divisional finals. A fourth place team in one division may qualify ahead of the third place team in the other division (the "Crossover"), if they earn more points in the season. If a third-place team finishes in a tie with the fourth place team in the other division, the third place team automatically gets the playoff spot and there is no crossover.

If two or more teams in the same division were equal in points, the following tiebreakers applied:

1. Most wins in all games
2. Head to head winning percentage (matches won divided by all matches played)
3. Head to head points difference
4. Head to head points ratio
5. Tiebreakers 3–5 applied sequentially to all divisional games
6. Tiebreakers 4 and 5 applied sequentially to all league games
7. Coin toss

Notes:

- 1. If two clubs remain tied after other club(s) are eliminated during any step, tie breakers reverts to step 2.

=== Standings ===
Note: GP = Games Played, W = Wins, L = Losses, T = Ties, PF = Points For, PA = Points Against, Pts = Points

Teams in bold are in playoff positions.

West Division
Team	GP	W	L	T	Pts	PF	PA	Div	Stk	
**Calgary Stampeders**	18	13	4	1	27	523	349	7–3	L3	Details
**Winnipeg Blue Bombers**	18	12	6	0	24	554	492	6–4	W1	Details
**Edmonton Eskimos**	18	12	6	0	24	510	495	5–5	W5	Details
**Saskatchewan Roughriders**	18	10	8	0	20	510	430	4–6	L1	Details
BC Lions	18	7	11	0	14	469	501	3–7	L1	Details

East Division
Team	GP	W	L	T	Pts	PF	PA	Div	Stk	
**Toronto Argonauts**	18	9	9	0	18	482	456	6–2	W2	Details
**Ottawa Redblacks**	18	8	9	1	17	495	452	5–3	W3	Details
Hamilton Tiger-Cats	18	6	12	0	12	443	545	4–4	W1	Details
Montreal Alouettes	18	3	15	0	6	314	580	1–7	L11	Details

- Saskatchewan (4th place in the West Division) qualified for the Crossover ahead of Hamilton (3rd place in the East Division) because Saskatchewan had 10 wins, Hamilton had 6 wins.
- Winnipeg finished 2nd in the West Division because they won their 2 game regular season series against Edmonton (2–0).

=== Attendance ===
2017 CFL Attendance
Team	Home Avg.	% of Capacity	League Avg. Diff.
BC	19,858.0	72.21%	-4,786.2
Calgary	27,380.8	76.80%	+2,736.6
Edmonton	32,435.1	58.32%	+7,790.9
Hamilton	23,722.4	97.62%	-921.8
Montreal	19,521.9	83.07%	-5,122.3
Ottawa	24,522.9	99.46%	-121.3
Saskatchewan	32,762.2	98.24%	+8,118
Toronto	13,913.7	51.53%	-10,730.6
Winnipeg	27,681.0	83.83%	+3,036.8
League average	24,644.2	77.94%	N/A

== CFL playoffs ==
This is the first Grey Cup being played in Ottawa in 13 years, in celebration of the 150th anniversary of Canada. Ottawa also hosted the 55th Grey Cup in 1967, in celebration of the centennial of Canada. Toronto's wide-receiver DeVier Posey was named as the Grey Cup's Most Valuable Player and Calgary's running back Jerome Messam was named the Grey Cup's Most Valuable Canadian.

=== Playoff bracket ===
November 12: Division Semi-Finals
East
W4	Saskatchewan Roughriders	31
E2	Ottawa Redblacks	20
West
W3	Edmonton Eskimos	39
W2	Winnipeg Blue Bombers	32

November 19: Division Finals
W4	Saskatchewan Roughriders	21
E1	Toronto Argonauts	25
W3	Edmonton Eskimos	28
W1	Calgary Stampeders	32

November 26: 105th Grey Cup; TD Place Stadium – Ottawa
E1	Toronto Argonauts	27
W1	Calgary Stampeders	24

== Award winners ==
=== CFL Top Performers of the Week ===
Week	First	Second	Third	Fans' Choice
One	Ricky Ray	S. J. Green	Jonathon Mincy	Ricky Ray
Two	Diontae Spencer	Trevor Harris	Weston Dressler	Weston Dressler
Three	S. J. Green	Solomon Elimimian	Victor Butler	S. J. Green
Four	Travis Lulay	Martese Jackson	Nick Moore	Martese Jackson
Five	Jerome Messam	Mike Reilly	Charleston Hughes	Mike Reilly
Six	Duron Carter	Marken Michel	Jackson Jeffcoat	Jackson Jeffcoat
Seven	Justin Medlock	Maurice Leggett	Bryan Burnham	Justin Medlock
Eight	Ed Gainey	Mike Reilly	Kevin Glenn	Ed Gainey
Nine	Andrew Harris	Matt Nichols	S. J. Green	S. J. Green
Ten	DaVaris Daniels	Nik Lewis	Diontae Spencer	Diontae Spencer
Eleven	Kevin Glenn	Alex Singleton	Shaquille Richardson	Alex Singleton
Twelve	Maurice Leggett	Brandon Zylstra	Jeremiah Masoli	Maurice Leggett
Thirteen	James Wilder Jr.	Alex Singleton	Diontae Spencer	Diontae Spencer
Fourteen	James Wilder Jr.	Darvin Adams	Ja'Gared Davis	Darvin Adams
Fifteen	Terry Williams	DeVier Posey	Chris Randle	Chris Randle
Sixteen	Brandon Zylstra	Trevor Harris	Jeremiah Masoli	Jeremiah Masoli
Seventeen	Kevin Fogg	S. J. Green	Duron Carter	Duron Carter
Eighteen	Brandon Banks	James Wilder Jr.	Duron Carter	Duron Carter
Nineteen	Diontae Spencer	Chris Rainey	Brandon Banks	Diontae Spencer
Twenty	James Wilder Jr.	Tristan Okpalaugo	Ricky Ray	

=== CFL Top Performers of the Month ===
Month	First	Second	Third
July	Mike Reilly	Greg Ellingson	Victor Butler
August	Andrew Harris	Matt Nichols	Maurice Leggett
September	Alex Singleton	James Wilder Jr.	Brandon Zylstra
October	Brandon Banks	Mike Reilly	Jeremiah Masoli

== 2017 CFL All-Stars ==
=== Offence ===
- QB – Mike Reilly, Edmonton Eskimos
- RB – Andrew Harris, Winnipeg Blue Bombers
- R – S. J. Green, Toronto Argonauts
- R – Brandon Zylstra, Edmonton Eskimos
- R – Greg Ellingson, Ottawa Redblacks
- R – Bryan Burnham, BC Lions
- R – Duron Carter, Saskatchewan Roughriders
- OT – Stanley Bryant, Winnipeg Blue Bombers
- OT – Chris Van Zeyl, Toronto Argonauts
- OG – Brendon LaBatte, Saskatchewan Roughriders
- OG – Matt O'Donnell, Edmonton Eskimos
- C – Sean McEwen, Toronto Argonauts

=== Defence ===
- DT – Micah Johnson, Calgary Stampeders
- DT – Almondo Sewell, Edmonton Eskimos
- DE – Charleston Hughes, Calgary Stampeders
- DE – Willie Jefferson, Saskatchewan Roughriders
- LB – Alex Singleton, Calgary Stampeders
- LB – Solomon Elimimian, BC Lions
- CLB – Kenny Ladler, Edmonton Eskimos
- CB – Ciante Evans, Calgary Stampeders
- CB – Chris Randle, Winnipeg Blue Bombers
- HB – Ed Gainey, Saskatchewan Roughriders
- HB – T.J. Heath, Winnipeg Blue Bombers
- S – Taylor Loffler, Winnipeg Blue Bombers

=== Special teams ===
- K – Rene Paredes, Calgary Stampeders
- P – Ty Long, BC Lions
- ST – Roy Finch, Calgary Stampeders

== 2017 CFL Western All-Stars ==
=== Offence ===
- QB – Mike Reilly, Edmonton Eskimos
- RB – Andrew Harris, Winnipeg Blue Bombers
- R – Darvin Adams, Winnipeg Blue Bombers
- R – Brandon Zylstra, Edmonton Eskimos
- R – Bryan Burnham, BC Lions
- R – Duron Carter, Saskatchewan Roughriders
- R – Naaman Roosevelt, Saskatchewan Roughriders
- OT – Stanley Bryant, Winnipeg Blue Bombers
- OT – Jermarcus Hardrick, Winnipeg Blue Bombers
- OG – Brendon LaBatte, Saskatchewan Roughriders
- OG – Matt O'Donnell, Edmonton Eskimos
- C – Ucambre Williams, Calgary Stampeders

=== Defence ===
- DT – Almondo Sewell, Edmonton Eskimos
- DT – Micah Johnson, Calgary Stampeders
- DE – Charleston Hughes, Calgary Stampeders
- DE – Willie Jefferson, Saskatchewan Roughriders
- LB – Solomon Elimimian, BC Lions
- LB – Alex Singleton, Calgary Stampeders
- CLB – Kenny Ladler, Edmonton Eskimos
- CB – Chris Randle, Winnipeg Blue Bombers
- CB – Ciante Evans, Calgary Stampeders
- HB – Ed Gainey, Saskatchewan Roughriders
- HB – T.J. Heath, Winnipeg Blue Bombers
- S – Taylor Loffler, Winnipeg Blue Bombers

=== Special teams ===
- K – Rene Paredes, Calgary Stampeders
- P – Ty Long, BC Lions
- ST – Roy Finch, Calgary Stampeders

== 2017 CFL Eastern All-Stars ==
=== Offence ===
- QB – Ricky Ray, Toronto Argonauts
- RB – William Powell, Ottawa Redblacks
- R – S. J. Green, Toronto Argonauts
- R – Brad Sinopoli, Ottawa Redblacks
- R – Greg Ellingson, Ottawa Redblacks
- R – Brandon Banks, Hamilton Tiger-Cats
- R – Luke Tasker, Hamilton Tiger-Cats
- OT – Jason Lauzon-Séguin, Ottawa Redblacks
- OT – Chris Van Zeyl, Toronto Argonauts
- OG – Ryan Bomben, Hamilton Tiger-Cats
- OG – Alex Mateas, Ottawa Redblacks
- C – Sean McEwen, Toronto Argonauts

=== Defence ===
- DT – Dylan Wynn, Toronto Argonauts
- DT – Cleyon Laing, Toronto Argonauts
- DE – Victor Butler, Toronto Argonauts
- DE – John Bowman, Montreal Alouettes
- LB – Larry Dean, Hamilton Tiger-Cats
- LB – Kyries Hebert, Montreal Alouettes
- CLB – Marcus Ball, Toronto Argonauts
- CB – Richard Leonard, Hamilton Tiger-Cats
- CB – Jonathon Mincy, Montreal Alouettes
- HB – Cassius Vaughn, Toronto Argonauts
- HB – Rico Murray, Toronto Argonauts
- S – Antoine Pruneau, Ottawa Redblacks

=== Special teams ===
- K – Sergio Castillo, Hamilton Tiger-Cats
- P – Brett Maher, Ottawa Redblacks
- ST – Diontae Spencer, Ottawa Redblacks

== 2017 CFL awards ==
- CFL's Most Outstanding Player Award – Mike Reilly (QB), Edmonton Eskimos
- CFL's Most Outstanding Canadian Award – Andrew Harris (RB), Winnipeg Blue Bombers
- CFL's Most Outstanding Defensive Player Award – Alex Singleton (LB), Calgary Stampeders
- CFL's Most Outstanding Offensive Lineman Award – Stanley Bryant, (OT), Winnipeg Blue Bombers
- CFL's Most Outstanding Rookie Award – James Wilder Jr. (RB), Toronto Argonauts
- John Agro Special Teams Award – Roy Finch (KR), Calgary Stampeders
- Tom Pate Memorial Award – Adarius Bowman (WR), Edmonton Eskimos
- Jake Gaudaur Veterans' Trophy – Luc Brodeur-Jourdain (C), Montreal Alouettes
- Annis Stukus Trophy – Marc Trestman, Toronto Argonauts
- Commissioner's Award – Rick Sowieta
- Hugh Campbell Distinguished Leadership Award – Paul Graham
