= 2013 Montreal Alouettes season =

Canadian football team season

- General manager: Jim Popp
- Head coach: Dan Hawkins (2–3); Jim Popp (Interim 6–7)
- Home stadium: Percival Molson Memorial Stadium

Results
- Record: 8–10
- Division place: 3rd, East
- Playoffs: Lost East Semi-Final
- Team MOP: Chip Cox
- Team MOC: Mike Edem
- Team MOR: Mike Edem

Uniform

The 2013 Montreal Alouettes season was the 47th season for the team in the Canadian Football League (CFL) and their 59th overall. The Alouettes finished in third place in the East Division with an 8–10 record and struggled to make the playoffs after losing Anthony Calvillo to a career ending concussion, but made the playoffs for an 18th straight season, but lost in the East Division Semi-Final to the Hamilton Tiger-Cats 19–16 in overtime.

== Offseason ==
=== CFL draft ===
The 2013 CFL draft took place on May 6, 2013. The Alouettes had nine selections in the seven-round draft, after acquiring additional first and fourth round selections for placekicker Brody McKnight.

Round	Pick	Player	Position	School/Club team
1	3	Mike Edem	LB	Calgary
1	5	Steven Lumbala	RB	Calgary
2	14	Hosam Shahin	DT	Rice
3	23	Jesse Joseph	DE	Connecticut
4	30	Nicolas Boulay	LB	Sherbrooke
4	32	Michael Klassen	DL	Calgary
5	41	Jake Piotrowski	OL	Guelph
6	47	Simon Legare	OL	Montreal
7	57	Damone Blackman	WR	Saint Mary's

== Preseason ==
Week	Date	Opponent	Venue	Score	Result	Attendance	Record
A	Thurs, June 13	Hamilton Tiger-Cats	Molson Stadium	33–26	Loss	20,514	0–1
B	Thurs, June 20	at Toronto Argonauts	Varsity Stadium	24–20	Loss	6,204	0–2

# Games played with colour uniforms.

== Regular season ==
=== Season standings ===
East Division
Team	GP	W	L	T	PF	PA	Pts	
Toronto Argonauts	18	11	7	0	507	458	22	Details
Hamilton Tiger-Cats	18	10	8	0	453	468	20	Details
Montreal Alouettes	18	8	10	0	459	471	16	Details
Winnipeg Blue Bombers	18	3	15	0	361	585	6	Details

=== Season schedule ===
Week	Date	Opponent	Venue	Score	Result	Attendance	Record	TV
1	Thurs, June 27	at Winnipeg Blue Bombers	Investors Group Field	38–33	Win	33,500	1–0	TSN/RDS/NBCSN
2	Thurs, July 4	Winnipeg Blue Bombers	Molson Stadium	19–11	Loss	22,134	1–1	TSN/RDS/ESPN2
3	Fri, July 12	Calgary Stampeders	Molson Stadium	22–14	Loss	23,184	1–2	TSN/RDS/ESPN3
4	Sat, July 20	at Calgary Stampeders	McMahon Stadium	38–27	Loss	27,378	1–3	TSN/RDS/ESPN2
5	Thurs, July 25	Edmonton Eskimos	Molson Stadium	32–27	Win	23,021	2–3	TSN/RDS/ESPN2
6	Bye							
7	Thurs, Aug 8	Toronto Argonauts	Molson Stadium	38–13	Loss	22,068	2–4	TSN/RDS/ESPN3
8	Sat, Aug 17	at Saskatchewan Roughriders	Mosaic Stadium	24–21	Loss	40,637	2–5	TSN/RDS/ESPN3
9	Thurs, Aug 22	BC Lions	Molson Stadium	39–38	Win	22,456	3–5	TSN/RDS/NBCSN
10	Tues, Sept 3	at Toronto Argonauts	Rogers Centre	20–9	Win	18,863	4–5	TSN/RDS/NBCSN
11	Sun, Sept 8	Toronto Argonauts	Molson Stadium	37–30	Loss	23,911	4–6	TSN/RDS/ESPN3
12	Sun, Sept 15	at BC Lions	BC Place Stadium	36–14	Loss	27,213	4–7	TSN/RDS/ESPN3
13	Sat, Sept 21	at Hamilton Tiger-Cats	Moncton Stadium	28–26	Loss	15,123	4–8	TSN/RDS/ESPN3
14	Sun, Sept 29	Saskatchewan Roughriders	Molson Stadium	17–12	Win	24,016	5–8	TSN/RDS/ESPN3
15	Sat, Oct 5	at Edmonton Eskimos	Commonwealth Stadium	47–24	Win	28,455	6–8	TSN/RDS/ESPN3
16	Mon, Oct 14	Winnipeg Blue Bombers	Molson Stadium	34–27	Loss	22,853	6–9	TSN/RDS/ESPN3
17	Sun, Oct 20	Hamilton Tiger-Cats	Molson Stadium	36–5	Win	23,390	7–9	TSN/RDS/ESPN3
18	Sat, Oct 26	at Hamilton Tiger-Cats	Alumni Stadium	27–24	Loss	13,012	7–10	TSN/RDS/ESPN3
19	Fri, Nov 1	at Toronto Argonauts	Rogers Centre	23–20	Win	22,589	8–10	TSN/RDS/NBCSN

# Games played with colour uniforms.
# Games played with white uniforms.
# Games played with alternate uniforms.

== Playoffs ==
=== Schedule ===
Game	Date	Time	Opponent	Venue	Score	Result	Attendance
East Semi-Final	Nov 10	1:00 PM EST	at Hamilton Tiger-Cats	Alumni Stadium	19–16 (OT)	Loss	13,320

# Game played with white uniforms.

=== East Semi-Final ===
Montreal at Hamilton

Team	1	2	3	4	OT	Total
Alouettes	2	0	7	4	3	16
• Tiger-Cats	0	0	6	7	6	19

- Date: November 10
- Location: Alumni Stadium
  Guelph, ON
- Game start: 1:00 PM EST
- Game attendance: 13,320
- Game weather: Intermittent Rain; −1 °C; wind 45 km/h
- Referee: Al Bradbury
- TV announcers (TSN): Chris Cuthbert (Play by Play), Glen Suitor (Colour), Sara Orlesky (Sideline)

== Roster ==
2013 Montreal Alouettes final roster
Quarterbacks: 4 Tanner Marsh; 8 Josh Neiswander; 3 Troy Smith; Running backs: 23 Jerome Messam; 46 Walter Spencer; 37 Tyrell Sutton; 2 Brandon Whitaker; Receivers: 0 Bo Bowling; 1 Arland Bruce; 89 Duron Carter; 88 Kyle Graves; 19 S. J. Green; 81 Patrick Lavoie; 14 Brandon London	Offensive linemen: 64 Ryan Bomben G; 59 Josh Bourke T; 58 Luc Brodeur-Jourdain C; 51 Kristian Matte G/C; 68 Michael Ola G/T; 54 Jeff Perrett T; Defensive linemen: 98 Bo Adebayo DE; 7 John Bowman DE; 91 Alan-Michael Cash DT; 95 Moton Hopkins DT; 90 Mike Klassen DT; 97 Aaron Lavarias DE; 76 Scott Paxson DT	Linebackers: 52 Nicolas Boulay MLB; 10 Marc-Olivier Brouillette OLB; 11 Chip Cox OLB; 38 Curtis Dublanko OLB; 41 Shea Emry MLB; 34 Kyries Hebert OLB; 31 Winston Venable OLB; Defensive backs: 39 Jerald Brown DH; 21 Mike Edem S; 29 Ed Gainey CB/DH; 17 Billy Parker DH; 12 Geoff Tisdale CB; 36 Daryl Townsend S; 33 Ben Wells CB; Special teams: 30 Burke Dales P; 6 Sean Whyte K/P; 82 Jerod Zaleski LS	Reserve list: 26 Michael Carter CB; 48 Bear Woods LB; Practice roster: 85 Ismaël Bamba WR; 43 Jonathan Beaulieu-Richard LB; 15 Alex Brink QB; -- Jerrell Harris DE; -- Trevard Lindley CB; 24 B. J. Scott S; 96 Josh Symons DT; -- Collins Ukwu DE; 80 Roberto Wallace WR; 47 Jamaan Webb CB/DH; 32 Mitchell White CB; 61 Ryan White T/G; -- Tenarius Wright DE	Injured list: 67 Pascal Baillargeon G; 50 Martin Bédard LS; 99 Scooter Berry DT; 13 Anthony Calvillo QB; 25 Tyron Carrier WR; 87 David Clowney WR; 9 Éric Deslauriers WR; 5 Noel Devine RB; 57 Scott Flory G; 46 Jamahl Knowles CB; 22 Steven Lumbala RB; 20 Byron Parker CB; 44 Brian Ridgeway LB; 18 Jamel Richardson SB; 16 Bryn Roy LB; 0 Anwar Stewart DE; 53 Jordan Verdone LB; 60 Andrew Woodruff G; Suspended list: 93 Deon Goggins DT; 65 Simon Légaré T; 62 Jake Piotrowski G; 12 Kyle Quinlan QB; Italics indicate American players

== Coaching staff ==
2013 Montreal Alouettes staff
Front office: Owner – Bob Wetenhall; CEO – Mark Weightman; VP, General Manager and Director of Football Operations and Player Personnel – Jim Popp; Assistant director of football operations and player personnel – Joey Abrams; Assistant director of pro/college scouting – Uzooma Okeke; Senior Player Personnel Executive/Salary Cap Analyst - Justin Casey; Coordinator of Football Administration/Salary Cap/Scout - Patrick Pion; Pro/College Scout – Jean-Marc Edme; Director of US College Scouting - Russ Lande; Head coaches: Head coach – Jim Popp; Assistant head coach – Mike Miller; Offensive coordinator – Doug Berry; Offensive coaches: Quarterbacks coach – Mike Miller; Running backs – Mark Speckman; Receivers – Erik Campbell; Offensive line – Frank Verducci; Offensive quality control – Ryan Dinwiddie	Defensive coaches: Defensive coordinator – Noel Thorpe; Defensive line – Keith Willis; Linebackers – Mark Nelson; Special teams coaches: Special teams coordinator – Ray Rychleski; → Coaching staff
