= 2014 Montreal Alouettes season =

Canadian football team season

- General manager: Jim Popp
- Head coach: Tom Higgins
- Home stadium: Percival Molson Memorial Stadium

Results
- Record: 9–9
- Division place: 2nd, East
- Playoffs: Lost East Final
- Team MOP: Duron Carter
- Team MOC: Jeff Perrett
- Team MOR: Gabriel Knapton

Uniform

The 2014 Montreal Alouettes season was the 48th season for the team in the Canadian Football League (CFL) and their 60th overall. The Alouettes finished the season in second place in the East Division with a 9–9 record. The Alouettes improved upon their 8–10 record from 2013 with their 9th win in their 17th game and qualified for the playoffs for the 19th straight season in that same game. The team defeated the BC Lions in the East Semi-Final, but lost the East Final to the Hamilton Tiger-Cats. The Alouettes set a CFL record as they were the first team to fall six games below .500 with a 1–7 record and finish with a .500 record or better.

== Offseason ==
=== CFL draft ===
The 2014 CFL draft took place on May 13, 2014. The Alouettes had eight selections in the seven-round draft, after acquiring an additional fourth round selection for Dahrran Diedrick.

Round	Pick	Player	Position	School/Club team
1	5	David Foucault	OL	Montreal
2	10	Andrew Lue	DB	Queen's
3	22	Jeffrey Finley	DL	Guelph
4	31	James Tuck	DL	York
4	35	Andrew Smith	WR	Manitoba
5	43	Nick Boyd	K/P	Manitoba
6	49	Jean-Christophe Beaulieu	FB	Sherbrooke
7	58	Mackenzie Sarro	WR/FB	Calgary

== Preseason ==
Week	Date	Kickoff	Opponent	Results		TV	Venue	Attendance	Summary
Week	Date	Kickoff	Opponent	Score	Record	TV	Venue	Attendance	Summary
A	Bye								
B	Sat, June 14	3:00 p.m. EDT	at Hamilton Tiger-Cats	L 23–28	0–1	None	Ron Joyce Stadium	5,573	Recap
C	Fri, June 20	7:00 p.m. EDT	vs. Ottawa Redblacks	L 10–26	0–2	TSN	Molson Stadium	18,141	Recap

# Games played with colour uniforms.

== Regular season ==
=== Standings ===
East Division
Team	GP	W	L	T	PF	PA	Pts	
Hamilton Tiger-Cats	18	9	9	0	417	395	18	Details
Montreal Alouettes	18	9	9	0	360	394	18	Details
Toronto Argonauts	18	8	10	0	450	456	16	Details
Ottawa Redblacks	18	2	16	0	278	465	4	Details

=== Schedule ===
Week	Date	Kickoff	Opponent	Results		TV	Venue	Attendance	Summary
Week	Date	Kickoff	Opponent	Score	Record	TV	Venue	Attendance	Summary
1	Sat, June 28	3:00 p.m. EDT	at Calgary Stampeders	L 8–29	0–1	TSN/RDS/ESPN2	McMahon Stadium	26,135	Recap
2	Fri, July 4	7:00 p.m. EDT	vs. BC Lions	W 24–9	1–1	TSN/RDS	Molson Stadium	20,018	Recap
3	Fri, July 11	7:00 p.m. EDT	vs. Winnipeg Blue Bombers	L 33–34	1–2	TSN/RDS	Molson Stadium	20,384	Recap
4	Sat, July 19	7:00 p.m. EDT	at BC Lions	L 5–41	1–3	TSN/RDS	BC Place	25,063	Recap
5	Bye								
6	Fri, Aug 1	7:00 p.m. EDT	vs. Toronto Argonauts	L 5–31	1–4	TSN/RDS	Molson Stadium	20,692	Recap
7	Fri, Aug 8	7:00 p.m. EDT	vs. Edmonton Eskimos	L 23–33	1–5	TSN/RDS	Molson Stadium	20,054	Recap
8	Sat, Aug 16	7:00 p.m. EDT	at Saskatchewan Roughriders	L 11–16	1–6	TSN/RDS	Mosaic Stadium	33,427	Recap
9	Fri, Aug 22	8:30 p.m. EDT	at Winnipeg Blue Bombers	L 16–24	1–7	TSN/RDS	Investors Group Field	29,881	Recap
10	Fri, Aug 29	7:30 p.m. EDT	vs. Ottawa Redblacks	W 20–10	2–7	TSN/RDS	Molson Stadium	19,440	Recap
11	Sun, Sept 7	1:00 p.m. EDT	vs. Hamilton Tiger-Cats	W 38–31	3–7	TSN/RDS/ESPN	Molson Stadium	20,551	Recap
12	Fri, Sept 12	9:00 p.m. EDT	at Edmonton Eskimos	L 16–33	3–8	TSN/RDS	Commonwealth Stadium	27,833	Recap
13	Sun, Sept 21	1:00 p.m. EDT	vs. Calgary Stampeders	W 31–15	4–8	TSN/RDS/ESPN2	Molson Stadium	19,892	Recap
14	Fri, Sept 26	7:00 p.m. EDT	at Ottawa Redblacks	W 15–7	5–8	TSN/RDS	TD Place Stadium	24,317	Recap
15	Bye								
16	Mon, Oct 13	1:00 p.m. EDT	vs. Saskatchewan Roughriders	W 40–9	6–8	TSN/RDS	Molson Stadium	23,069	Recap
17	Sat, Oct 18	4:00 p.m. EDT	at Toronto Argonauts	W 20–12	7–8	TSN/RDS	Rogers Centre	16,834	Recap
18	Fri, Oct 24	6:30 p.m. EDT	at Ottawa Redblacks	W 23–17	8–8	TSN/RDS	TD Place Stadium	24,458	Recap
19	Sun, Nov 2	12:00 p.m. EST	vs. Toronto Argonauts	W 17–14	9–8	TSN/RDS	Molson Stadium	22,013	Recap
20	Sat, Nov 8	4:00 p.m. EST	at Hamilton Tiger-Cats	L 15–29	9–9	TSN/RDS	Tim Hortons Field	24,186	Recap

# Games played with colour uniforms.
# Games played with white uniforms.
# Games played with alternate uniforms.

== Post-season ==
=== Schedule ===
Game	Date	Kickoff	Opponent	Results		TV	Venue	Attendance	Summary
Game	Date	Kickoff	Opponent	Score	Record	TV	Venue	Attendance	Summary
East Semi-Final	Sun, Nov 16	1:00 p.m. EST	vs. BC Lions	W 50–17	1–0	TSN/RDS	Molson Stadium	15,107	Recap
East Final	Sun, Nov 23	1:00 p.m. EST	at Hamilton Tiger-Cats	L 24–40	1–1	TSN/RDS/ESPN	Tim Hortons Field	24,334	Recap

# Games played with colour uniforms.
# Games played with white uniforms.

== Roster ==
2014 Montreal Alouettes final roster
Quarterbacks: 15 Alex Brink; 18 Jonathan Crompton; 4 Tanner Marsh; Running backs: 46 Jean-Christophe Beaulieu; 26 Chris Rainey; 33 Brandon Rutley; Receivers: 89 Duron Carter; 9 Éric Deslauriers; 3 Mardy Gilyard; 81 Kyle Graves; 19 S. J. Green; 14 Brandon London; 88 Dave Stala	Offensive linemen: 64 Ryan Bomben G; 59 Josh Bourke T; 58 Luc Brodeur-Jourdain C; 51 Kristian Matte G; 54 Jeff Perrett T; 62 Jake Piotrowski G; 61 Ryan White T/G; Defensive linemen: 7 John Bowman DE; 91 Alan-Michael Cash DT; 49 Jeff Finley DE; 55 Gabe Knapton DE; 76 Scott Paxson DT; 50 D. J. Roberts DE	Linebackers: 52 Nicolas Boulay; 10 Marc-Olivier Brouillette; 11 Chip Cox; 34 Kyries Hebert; 35 Kyle Norris; 30 James Tuck; 31 Winston Venable; 48 Bear Woods; Defensive backs: 39 Jerald Brown; 21 Mike Edem; 38 Dominique Ellis; 25 Jamahl Knowles; 44 Andrew Lue; 17 Billy Parker; 12 Geoff Tisdale; 36 Daryl Townsend; 32 Mitchell White	Special teams: 6 Sean Whyte K/P; 82 Jerod Zaleski LS; Reserve list: 95 Corvey Irvin DT; Practice roster: 24 Nick Boyd K/P; 41 Kyler Ellsworth LB; 40 Samuel Fournier FB; 93 Damien Jacobs DT; 0 Jerrod Johnson QB; 66 Ty Neschke T; 99 Caesar Rayford DE; 42 Bryan Shepherd DB; 23 Chris Smith DB	Injured list: 67 Pascal Baillargeon G; 43 Jonathan Beaulieu-Richard LB; 37 Martin Bédard LS; 0 Bo Bowling WR; 45 Brian Brikowski DE; 29 Dahrran Diedrick FB; 85 Chad Johnson WR; 90 Mike Klassen DT; 97 Aaron Lavarias DE; 65 Simon Légaré T; 22 Steven Lumbala RB; 98 Jermaine McElveen DT; 80 James Rodgers WR; 16 Bryn Roy LB; 83 Andrew Smith WR; 8 Kenny Stafford SB; 37 Tyrell Sutton RB; 5 Larry Taylor WR; 47 Jamaan Webb DB; 2 Brandon Whitaker RB; Italics indicate American players

== Coaching staff ==
2014 Montreal Alouettes staff
Front office: Owner – Bob Wetenhall; CEO – Mark Weightman; VP, General Manager and Director of Football Operations and Player Personnel – Jim Popp; Assistant director of football operations and player personnel – Joey Abrams; Assistant director of pro/college scouting – Uzooma Okeke; Senior Player Personnel Executive/Salary Cap Analyst - Justin Casey; Coordinator of Football Administration/Salary Cap/Scout - Patrick Pion; Pro/College Scout – Jean-Marc Edme; Director of US College Scouting - Russ Lande; Head coaches: Head coach – Tom Higgins; Assistant head coach – Noel Thorpe; Consultant – Don Matthews; Offensive coaches: Offensive coordinator – Ryan Dinwiddie; Running backs – Mark Speckman; Receivers – Turk Schonert; Offensive line – Kris Sweet; Quarterbacks – Jeff Garcia; Offensive quality control – André Bolduc	Defensive coaches: Defensive coordinator/defensive backs – Noel Thorpe; Defensive line – Keith Willis; Linebackers – Greg Quick; Defensive quality control – Anwar Stewart; Defensive assistant – Jean-Vincent Posy-Audette; Special teams coaches: Special teams coordinator – Ray Rychleski; Special teams assistant – André Bolduc; Special teams assistant – Jean-Vincent Posy-Audette; → Coaching staff
