= Troy Smith =

American gridiron football player (born 1984)

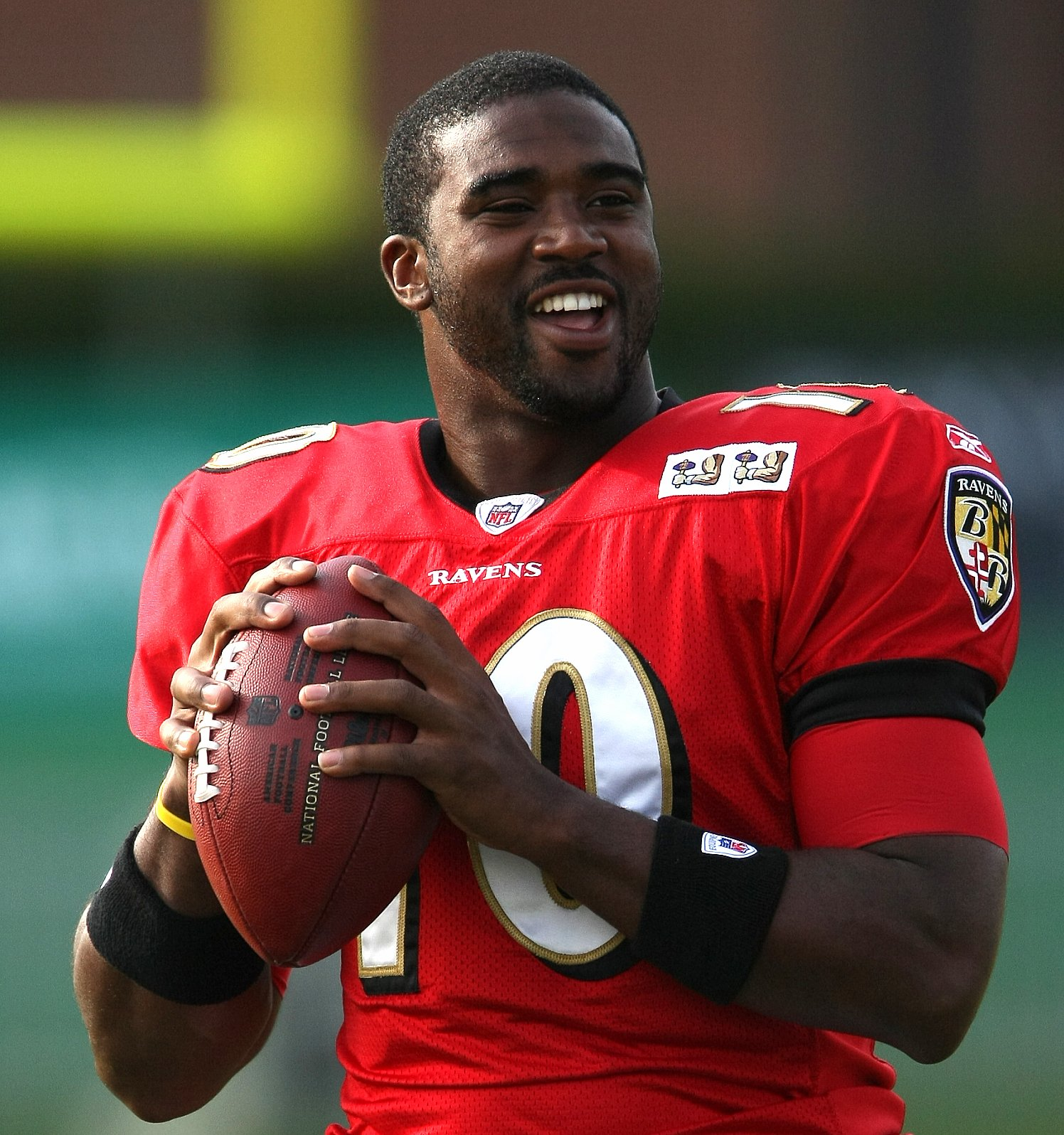
- Smith with the Baltimore Ravens in 2009

No. 10, 1
- Position: Quarterback

Personal information
- Born: July 20, 1984 (age 42); Columbus, Ohio, U.S.
- Listed height: 6 ft 0 in (1.83 m)
- Listed weight: 225 lb (102 kg)

Career information
- High school: Glenville (Cleveland, Ohio)
- College: Ohio State (2002–2006)
- NFL draft: 2007: 5th round, 174th overall pick

Career history
- Baltimore Ravens (2007–2009); San Francisco 49ers (2010); Omaha Nighthawks (2011); Pittsburgh Steelers (2012)*; Montreal Alouettes (2013–2014)
- * Offseason or practice squad member only

Awards and highlights
- BCS national champion (2002); Heisman Trophy (2006); Unanimous All-American (2006)

Career NFL statistics
- Passing attempts: 234
- Passing completions: 121
- Completion percentage: 51.7%
- TD–INT: 8–5
- Passing yards: 1,734
- Passer rating: 78.5
- Rushing yards: 220
- Rushing touchdowns: 3
- Stats at Pro Football Reference

Career CFL statistics
- Passing attempts: 288
- Passing completions: 143
- Completion percentage: 49.7%
- TD–INT: 13–9
- Passing yards: 1,873
- Stats at CFL.ca (archived)

Troy James Smith (born July 20, 1984) is an American former professional football quarterback who played in the National Football League (NFL) for four seasons. He played college football for the Ohio State Buckeyes, winning the Heisman Trophy in 2006. Due to concerns about his size and an unimpressive performance in the 2007 BCS National Championship Game, he was not selected until the fifth round of the 2007 NFL draft by the Baltimore Ravens. Smith spent his first three seasons with the Ravens and his last with the San Francisco 49ers, mostly as a backup. After being released by the 49ers, he played one season with the Omaha Nighthawks of the United Football League (UFL) and two with the Montreal Alouettes of the Canadian Football League (CFL).

== Early life ==
Smith's mother raised him and two siblings in Columbus, Ohio, then moved to the Glenville neighborhood of Cleveland. In 1993, Smith was placed in foster care with Diane and Irvin White while his mother dealt with personal issues.

Smith first developed an interest in playing football in Cleveland, where he played for the Glenville A's, initially as running back and tight end. Irvin White, his coach, moved Smith to quarterback after a few games and Smith remained in the position. Smith played his first two years at St. Edward High School in Lakewood, Ohio, but was thrown off the team after elbowing an opponent in the head while playing in a varsity basketball game. He transferred to Glenville High School in Cleveland shortly thereafter.

Smith graduated from Glenville, where he was coached by Ted Ginn Sr., father of his teammate Ted Ginn Jr., who he would be reunited with at the college level and professional level. After his junior football season in high school, Smith was invited to participate in the Elite 11 competition, featuring the eleven top ranked high school quarterback prospects in the United States. He earned good praise following his performance, and although it was relatively late in the recruiting process, West Virginia and Ohio State offered Smith a football scholarship. He verbally committed to the Buckeyes, signing his letter of intent on February 6, 2002, the last player for the upcoming season. Smith threw for 969 yards and 12 touchdowns in his senior year, while leading Glenville to the state playoffs. Smith also played three years of basketball and ran track (high jump, long jump and 1,600-meter relay).

== College career ==
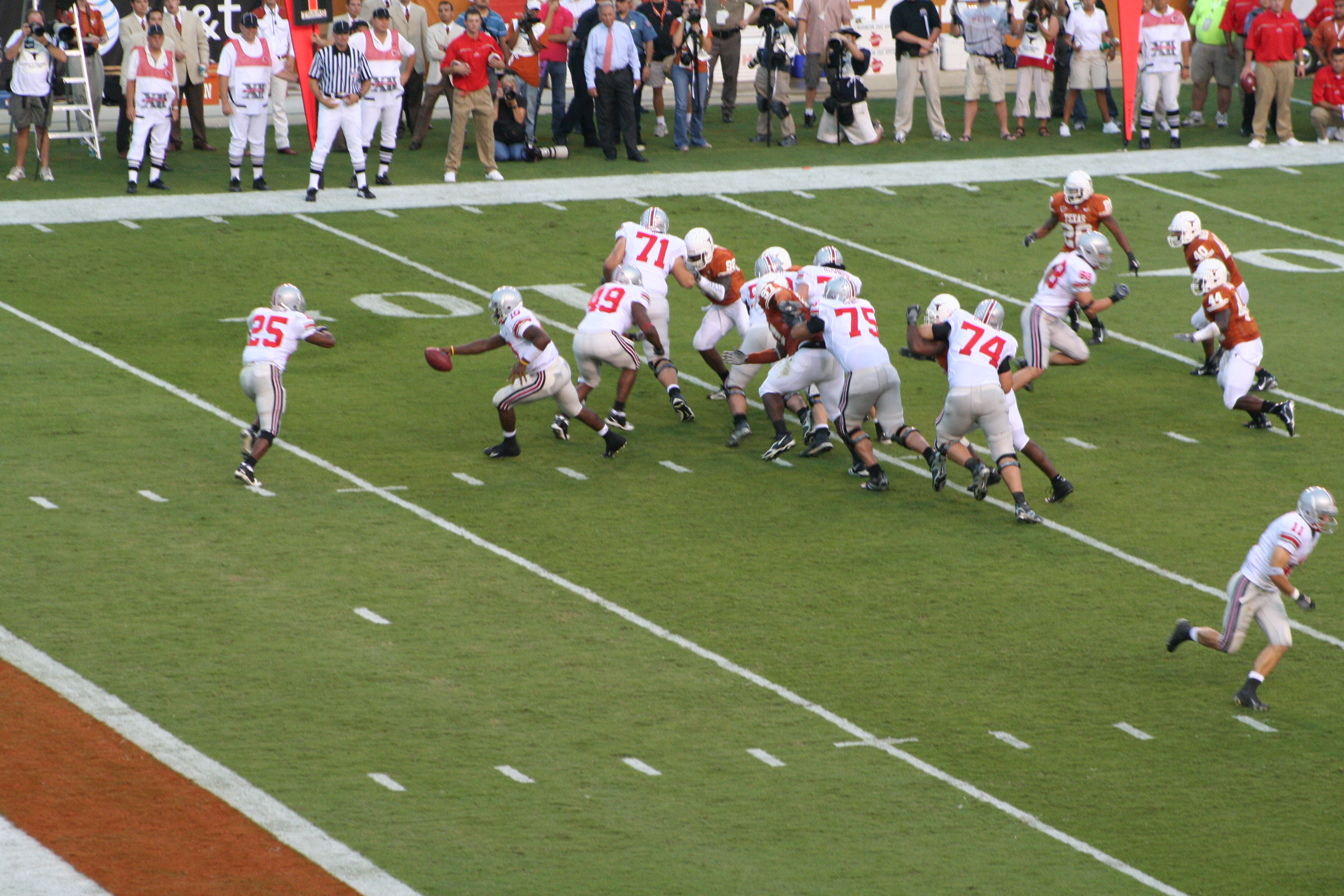
Smith hands off to Antonio Pittman against the Texas Longhorns

Smith received an athletic scholarship to attend Ohio State University, where he played for coach Jim Tressel's Ohio State Buckeyes football team from 2003 to 2006. He redshirted in the 2002 season where the Buckeyes beat Miami in the National Championship. As a redshirted freshman for the Buckeyes, Smith played sparingly at running back and kick returner in 2003. Smith played the season opener against the Washington Huskies as a scatback and returner, and he compiled fourteen yards rushing and 83 return yards. After the game, he came on the NFL scouting radar as an "athlete."

He entered his sophomore season as the backup quarterback to Justin Zwick, but took over as the starter when Zwick was injured halfway through the 2004 season against the Iowa Hawkeyes. Smith won four of the five games he started in 2004, including a victory over the archrival Michigan Wolverines. Smith was suspended for breaking an undisclosed team rule before the 2004 Alamo Bowl, with the NCAA extending the suspension to include the first game of the 2005 season, after it was revealed that Smith had accepted $500 from a booster.

With Smith at quarterback, Ohio State lost only two games in the 2005 regular season, and in only one of those was Smith the starter. The first was to the eventual BCS National Champion Texas Longhorns (which he did not start) and the other was to the Penn State Nittany Lions, co-Big Ten champions. Smith's 2005 stats included 2,282 passing yards with 16 touchdowns and four interceptions. This led to a passer rating of 162.66, the fourth-highest of the season. He rushed for 611 yards and 11 touchdowns on 136 carries. In January 2006, he was named the Offensive MVP of the Fiesta Bowl, after leading the Buckeyes to a 34–20 win over the Notre Dame Fighting Irish.

In the second week of the 2006 season, Smith and the Buckeyes took revenge for their 2005 loss to Texas. The top ranked Buckeyes won their rematch with the (again) second-ranked Texas Longhorns, 24–7. Smith went 17 of 27 with 269 yards passing, two touchdowns, and no interceptions. For many fans and analysts, Smith's performance against the Longhorns gave credibility to the preseason Heisman Trophy hype he had received. His passing statistics improved during the 2006 season, completing 67% of his passes for 2,507 yards, with 30 touchdowns and five interceptions. This led to a quarterback rating of 167.87, again fourth in the country.

Smith was one of five finalists for the 2006 Johnny Unitas Golden Arm Award, given to the top senior college quarterback.

Teammates voted Smith the 2006 most valuable player. On December 7, 2006, the Davey O'Brien Foundation awarded Smith the Davey O'Brien Award for best college quarterback. He was also a first-team All-Big Ten selection, and was recognized as a unanimous All-American.

In three games against Michigan, Smith has a total of 1,151 yards of total offense, two rushing touchdowns, and seven passing touchdowns. The Buckeyes won all three games, making Smith the first Ohio State quarterback since Tippy Dye (1934–1936) to quarterback in three victories over Michigan, and the first to win three straight games against Michigan as a starter.

Smith's college football career came to an end on January 8, 2007, when he and the Buckeyes were beaten by the Florida Gators in the 2007 BCS National Championship Game, 41–14. Smith completed just four of 14 passes for 35 yards along with an interception, a fumble, and was sacked five times.

In 2010, Adam Rittenberg of ESPN listed Smith as the "Big Ten player of the decade."

=== Heisman Trophy ===
Smith won the 2006 Heisman Memorial Trophy on December 9, 2006. He beat out sophomore RB Darren McFadden (2nd) from Arkansas and senior QB Brady Quinn (3rd) from Notre Dame.

In winning the 2006 Heisman Trophy, Smith took 91.6% of the first place votes, a record that stood for 13 years. His tally of 2,540 votes was the third largest behind that of the then-2005 Heisman Trophy winner, Reggie Bush of the University of Southern California (2,541 votes) and 1968 Heisman winner O. J. Simpson, who also played for USC (2,853 votes). His margin of victory (1,662 votes) was also the second largest in the history of the award, eclipsed only by Simpson who won by 1,750 votes.

Smith joined Les Horvath (1944), Vic Janowicz (1950), Howard "Hopalong" Cassady (1955), Archie Griffin (1974 and 1975), and Eddie George (1995) as Ohio State Heisman winners.

== Professional career ==
=== Pre-draft ===
As a graduating senior, Smith entered professional football in the 2007 NFL draft. Despite winning the Heisman Trophy, Smith saw his draft stock drop considerably after the 41–14 loss to the Florida Gators in the 2007 BCS National Championship Game. At 6ft 0 inches, his height (considered smaller than ideal) was cited as a liability.

Pre-draft measurables
Height	Weight	Arm length	Hand span	40-yard dash	10-yard split	20-yard split	20-yard shuttle	Three-cone drill	Vertical jump	Broad jump
6 ft 0 in (1.83 m)	225 lb (102 kg)	33 1/4 in (0.84 m)	10 1/8 in (0.26 m)	4.72 s	1.60 s	2.73 s	4.23 s	6.93 s	36.5 in (0.93 m)	10 ft 2 in (3.10 m)
All values from NFL Combine/Pro Day

=== Baltimore Ravens ===
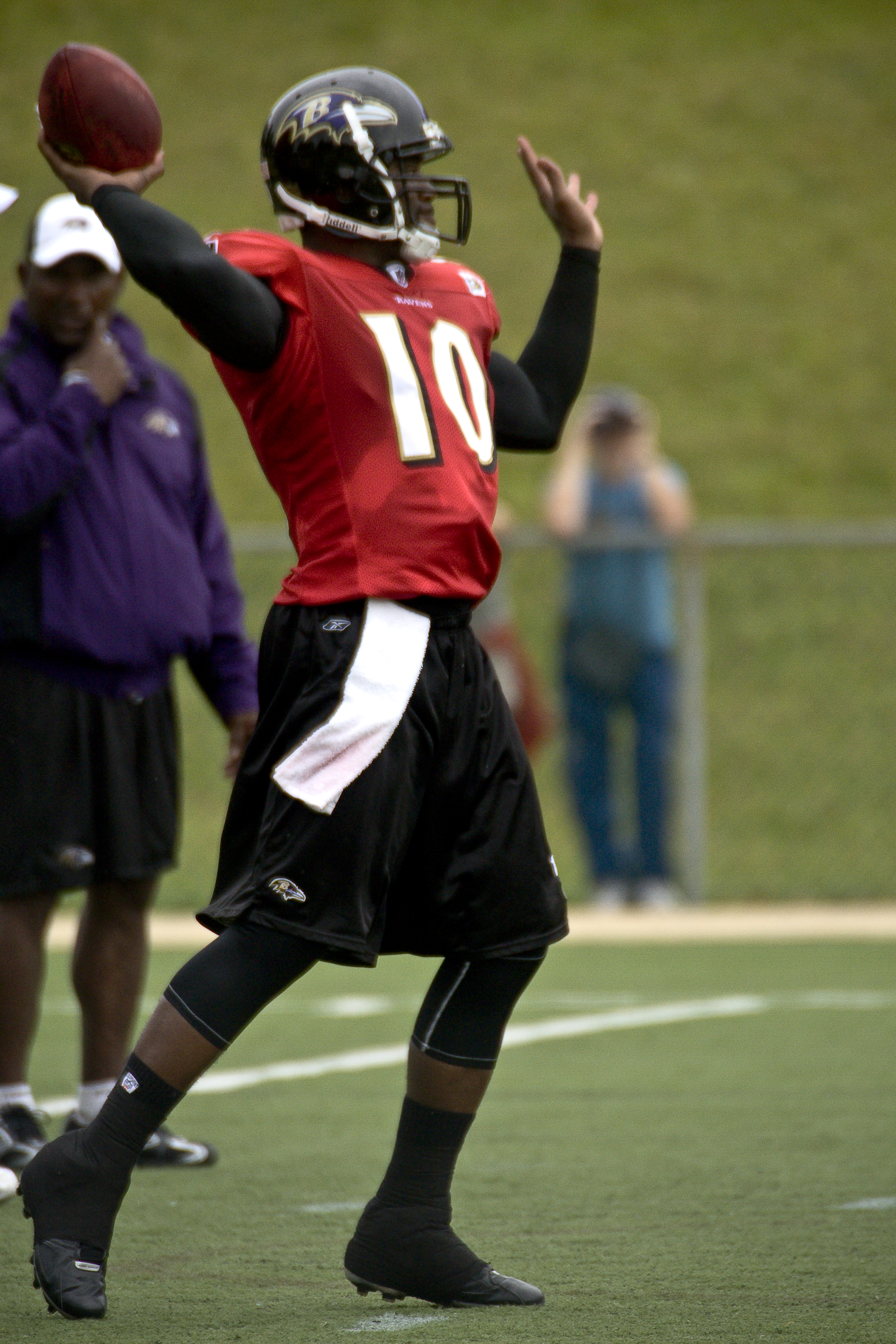
Smith with the Ravens during training camp, 2008

Smith was quoted by the media urging his hometown team, the Cleveland Browns, to select him in the 2007 NFL draft. Fans also set up a website urging the Browns to take Smith. However, the Browns selected Notre Dame quarterback Brady Quinn, a fellow Ohio native, 22nd overall, reducing the chances of Smith going to Cleveland. On Day 2, Smith was finally drafted at the end of the fifth round by the Baltimore Ravens. He signed a three-year contract with the Ravens on July 24. On August 27, Drew Olson was released by the Ravens, elevating Smith to the third-string quarterback position. Smith was named second-string quarterback for the Ravens on November 13, backing up new starter Kyle Boller, after a shoulder injury to starter Steve McNair. Ravens head coach Brian Billick maintained that Smith could be used in the future, stating: "That's going to be a fun challenge for Troy, because now he's been around enough. The focus and attention that he brings to [preparing] is heightened."

Smith got his first regular season playing time in the fourth quarter of the home game against the Indianapolis Colts on December 9, completing three of five pass attempts and scrambling six yards for his first NFL touchdown in the 44–20 loss. After his relative success against the Colts, many Ravens fans were calling for Smith to replace Boller as the Ravens' starting quarterback. On December 16, Smith came in for an injured Boller in the game against the Miami Dolphins. Smith led the Ravens down the field for a field goal that forced overtime. The Ravens lost 22–16 in overtime, after a missed 44-yard field goal. On December 20, Boller officially was considered the backup due to injury for the Week 16 game, giving Smith his first professional start against the Seattle Seahawks. He completed fewer than 50% of his passes and fumbled twice in this game. The Ravens lost 27–6, scoring a touchdown with about four minutes to play and the game out of reach. In Week 17, the Ravens beat the Steelers with Smith starting again. He went 16-of-27 for 171 yards and one touchdown, with no interceptions and no fumbles lost. This was the Ravens' first win since Week 6, ending a 9-game losing streak with a bye at Week 8. Smith finished his rookie season by totaling 506 total yards and three touchdowns in four games. He had 452 yards and two touchdowns passing and rushed for 54 yards and one touchdown.

Smith was scheduled to start in the third preseason game of the 2008 season, but became ill with a rare disease called Lemierre's syndrome. Due to Smith's illness, rookie Joe Flacco was named to the Ravens' starting quarterback position. Early in the season, Smith re-emerged in the offense as part of their two-quarterback offense, and was utilized for short-yardage runs. This offense featured Smith lining up at the wide receiver spot as well as under center. Smith appeared in only six of the Ravens' 19 games and had a total of 4 passing attempts for 82 yards in the 2008 season.

For the 2009 season, Flacco was named the starting quarterback for the second consecutive year, while Smith was active for only four of sixteen games. Smith completed five of nine passes for 24 yards with one interception during the season. In addition, he also rushed eight times for thirty-one yards, including his career-long fifteen-yard touchdown run.

Smith re-signed with the Ravens for one-year worth $1.101 million. Smith received the low 5th round tender as a restricted free agent. However, no team was willing to part ways with the pick so Smith was not signed. After signing Marc Bulger as the team's backup to Flacco, the Ravens released Smith on September 4.

=== San Francisco 49ers ===
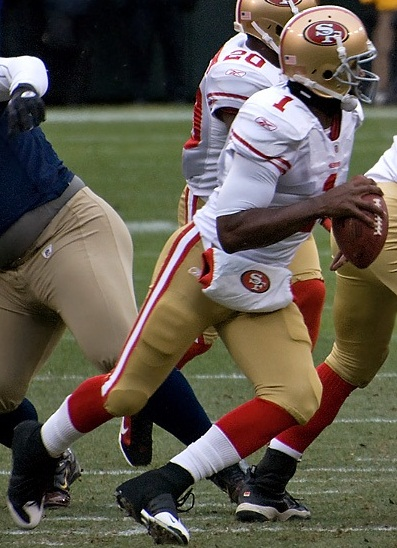
Smith playing for the 49ers, 2010

On September 6, 2010, Smith signed with the San Francisco 49ers, in a move that reunited him with former high school and college teammate, Ted Ginn Jr.

On October 27, Smith was announced as the starter of the 49ers' game against the Denver Broncos in London. He became the first black quarterback to start for the 49ers. During this game, Smith ran for one touchdown and threw another in a 24–16 win. Smith struggled early on, passing for just 37 yards in the first half; however he excelled in the second half by going 8 for 10 for 159 yards, and leading the Niners to three fourth-quarter touchdown drives. Smith was named the Sports Illustrated NFL Offensive Player of the Week for his performance.

Smith was again given the start for the 49ers' next game against the St. Louis Rams. He led the 49ers to an overtime victory by out-dueling Rams rookie Sam Bradford in a matchup of Heisman Trophy-winning quarterbacks. He threw for 356 yards, one touchdown and ran for 12 yards without being intercepted.

Smith's two straight wins as a starter earned him the starting job for the next three weeks, before he was replaced by the previous starting quarterback Alex Smith. During that time span, the younger Smith went 3–2 for a 49ers team that finished the season 6–10 overall.

Despite Smith's success as their starting quarterback, the 49ers chose not to re-sign Smith after he became a free agent. This was mostly because new head coach Jim Harbaugh was expected to seek different options (though he eventually did choose to go with Alex Smith).

=== Omaha Nighthawks ===
Smith was signed by the Omaha Nighthawks of the United Football League on September 2, 2011. An injury to fellow Heisman Trophy-winner Eric Crouch in the season opener opened the door for Smith to become the starter, though the Nighthawks decided to go with Jeremiah Masoli who had been with the team longer.

Smith's first UFL start came in Omaha's final game of the season, a 25–19 loss to the Sacramento Mountain Lions in the consolation round of the postseason. In the game, Smith completed 17-of-33 passes for 191 yards, two touchdowns, and one interception, including an 81-yard touchdown pass to Chad Lucas.

=== Pittsburgh Steelers ===
The Pittsburgh Steelers signed Smith on January 20, 2012. He was released by the team on June 25.

=== Montreal Alouettes ===
On August 14, 2013, Smith signed a two-year contract with the Montreal Alouettes of the Canadian Football League. Smith recorded his first win with the Alouettes in his first start on October 20, against the Hamilton Tiger-Cats by a score of 36–5. Smith started the last three regular season games of the season, posting a 2–1 record, leading head coach Jim Popp to name him the starter for the playoffs. Smith finished his first year in the CFL with a completion percentage of 52.6%, 884 passing yards, nine touchdowns, and five interceptions, in six games played. However, against the same Tiger-Cats in Guelph, Ontario, the Alouettes lost 19–16 in overtime. Following the 2013 CFL season, Smith was re-signed to a three-year contract, which kept him with the Alouettes through the 2016 season. Smith started the first six games of the 2014 season, winning only once. Due to his poor play and the team's underperformance, Smith was unconditionally released from his contract by the Alouettes on October 16, 2014.

== Career statistics ==
=== Professional ===
Year	Team	Games		Passing							Rushing					
Year	Team	GP	GS	Att	Cmp	Pct	Yds	TD	Int	Rtg	Att	Yds	Avg	Lng	TD	Fum
2007	BAL	4	2	76	40	52.6	452	2	0	79.5	12	54	4.5	14	1	3
2008	BAL	6	0	4	3	75.0	82	1	0	156.2	9	24	2.7	8	0	0
2009	BAL	4	0	9	5	55.6	24	0	1	21.3	8	31	3.9	15	1	0
2010	SF	6	6	145	73	50.3	1,176	5	4	77.8	23	121	5.3	16	1	6
NFL career		20	8	234	121	51.7	1,734	8	5	78.5	52	230	4.4	16	3	9
2013	MTL	12	3	114	60	52.6	884	9	5	86.3	16	40	2.5	9	2	3
2014	MTL	7	6	173	83	47.9	989	4	4	64	7	56	8.0	21	0	2
CFL career		19	9	287	143	49.8	1,873	13	9	72.8	23	96	4.2	21	2	5

=== College ===
Year	Team	Games			Passing								Rushing			
Year	Team	GP	GS	Record	Cmp	Att	Pct	Yds	Avg	TD	Int	Rate	Att	Yds	Avg	TD
2002	Ohio State	0	0	—	(redshirt) Redshirted											
2003	Ohio State	11	0	—	0	0	0.0	0	0.0	0	0	0.0	3	14	4.7	0
2004	Ohio State	8	5	4–1	68	122	55.7	896	7.3	8	3	134.2	82	339	4.1	2
2005	Ohio State	11	11	9–2	149	237	62.9	2,282	9.6	16	4	162.7	136	611	4.5	11
2006	Ohio State	13	13	12–1	203	311	65.3	2,542	8.2	30	6	161.9	62	228	3.8	1
Career		45	29	25–4	420	670	62.7	5,720	8.5	54	13	159.7	283	1,197	4.2	14

== Awards and honors ==
NFL

- Sports Illustrated NFL Offensive Player of the Week (Week 8, 2010)

College

- BCS national champion (2002)
- Heisman Trophy (2006)
- Davey O'Brien Award (2006)
- Chic Harley Award (2006)
- Walter Camp Award (2006)
- Archie Griffin Award (2006)
- AP College Football Player of the Year (2006)
- SN Player of the Year (2006)
- Quarterback of the Year (2006)
- Unanimous All-American (2006)
- Big Ten Most Valuable Player (2006)
- Big Ten Offensive Player of the Year (2006)
- First-team All-Big Ten (2006)
- Fiesta Bowl MVP (2006)
- Buckeyes MVP (2006)
- 2006 Senior Bowl (2006)
- Number (10) honored at Ohio State in 2014.

== Personal life ==
Smith graduated from Ohio State University with a bachelor's degree in communication.

Smith, a father of two children, has advocated for passage of the FIT Kids Act. The act would require school districts to report on students' physical activity and to give health and nutritional information to children.

Smith was arrested on October 20, 2017, for driving while intoxicated in Ohio.

== See also ==
- Racial issues faced by black quarterbacks
