= Duron Carter =

American gridiron football player (born 1991)

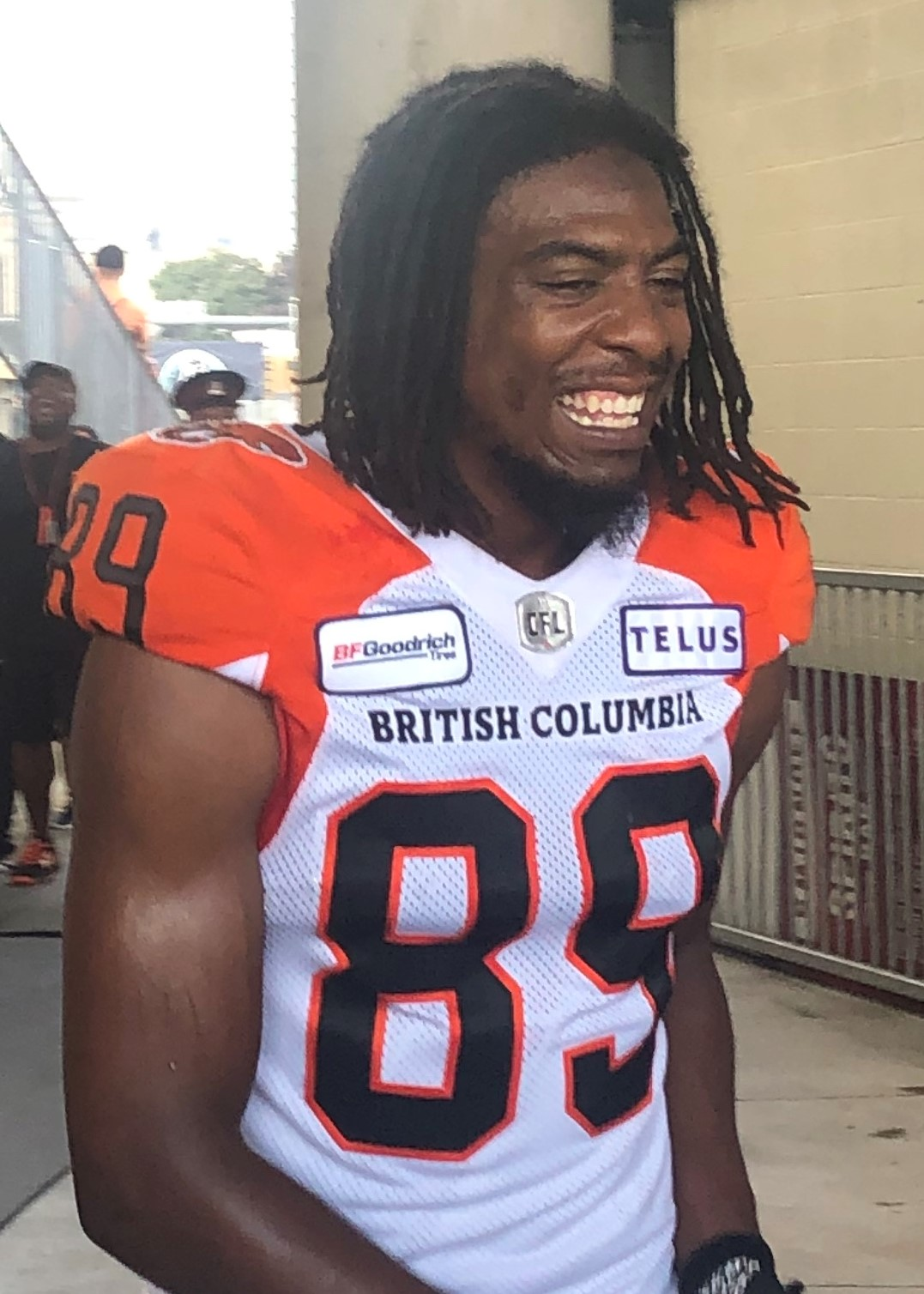
- Carter with the BC Lions in 2019

No. 89, 8
- Positions: Wide receiver, defensive back

Personal information
- Born: March 22, 1991 (age 35); Fort Lauderdale, Florida, U.S.
- Listed height: 6 ft 5 in (1.96 m)
- Listed weight: 205 lb (93 kg)

Career information
- High school: St. Thomas Aquinas (Fort Lauderdale)
- College: Ohio State (2009); Coffeyville (2010)
- NFL draft: 2013: undrafted

Career history
- 2013–2014: Montreal Alouettes
- 2015: Indianapolis Colts*
- 2016: Montreal Alouettes
- 2017–2018: Saskatchewan Roughriders
- 2018: Toronto Argonauts
- 2019: BC Lions
- 2022: Edmonton Elks
- * Offseason or practice squad member only

Awards and highlights
- 2× CFL All-Star (2014, 2017); CFL East All-Star (2014); CFL West All-Star (2017)

Career CFL statistics
- Receptions: 343
- Receiving yards: 4,764
- Receiving touchdowns: 30
- Tackles: 52
- Interceptions: 3
- Total touchdowns: 36
- Stats at CFL.ca

Duron Christopher Carter (born March 22, 1991) is an American former professional football wide receiver and defensive back who played in the Canadian Football League (CFL) with the Montreal Alouettes, Saskatchewan Roughriders, Toronto Argonauts, BC Lions, and Edmonton Elks.

He is the son of Pro Football Hall of Fame player Cris Carter, and played college football at Ohio State and Coffeyville Community College, but off-field issues and academic ineligibility prevented him continuing to play in Division I football. He also attended Alabama and Florida Atlantic but did not play in a game for either school. He entered the 2013 NFL draft but was not selected. Carter had a tryout for the Minnesota Vikings in 2013, but was not offered a contract. He then played two years with the Alouettes before signing with the Indianapolis Colts of the National Football League (NFL), where he spent a season on the practice squad.

== Early life ==
Carter attended St. Thomas Aquinas High School in Fort Lauderdale, Florida, where he played football, basketball, and ran track. Playing as a wide receiver for Coach George Smith, he led the St. Thomas Aquinas Raiders to back-to-back Florida state 5A titles in 2007 and 2008. The Raiders 15–0 record earned them No. 1 ranking in America among prep teams. He recorded 39 receptions for 739 yards and 14 touchdowns as a senior, and was selected to play in the Under Armour All-America Game. Carter earned first-team All-Broward honors and was an Orlando Sentinel All-Southern. While at St. Thomas, Carter was teammates with Phillip Dorsett, who would become his Indianapolis Colts teammate in 2015.

He was regarded as a four-star prospect by Rivals.com and was ranked as the No. 11 wide receiver in the country. He was also ranked No. 90 in the Rivals 100 Super Prep Florida Top 20.

== College career ==
=== Ohio State ===
As a true freshman at Ohio State, Carter played in 12 games, and was sixth on the team with 13 receptions for 178 yards (13.5 yards per catch). Like his father, he caught a touchdown as an OSU freshman with a five-yard grab against Indiana in the fifth game of the season. He also returned two punts for 24 yards with a long of 20 yards and made one tackle on special teams. Carter was declared academically ineligible for Ohio State's appearance in the Rose Bowl game following the 2009 regular season, an issue that also kept him out of spring practice in 2010. He left the Buckeyes in June of that year and enrolled at a junior college in Kansas.

=== Junior college ===
Carter spent his sophomore season at Coffeyville Community College in Coffeyville, Kansas, where he proved to be a playmaker in the receiving corps. He recorded 44 receptions for 690 yards and 10 touchdowns in 2010, helping guide the Red Ravens to a 6–5 record and a berth in the Graphic Edge Bowl. However, once Carter was eligible for the NFL Draft in 2014 his quarterback (Cayden Cochran) tweeted the following:

"The team that drafts Duron Carter will get the most lazy, whiny & non-work ethic player the nfl has ever seen. I played w/him. Horrible person & will be a complete cancer to any team on the board."

=== Alabama ===
Carter transferred into the Alabama program in the summer of 2011. After transferring to Alabama in April 2011 from the JUCO ranks, eligibility issues again involving academics kept him from practicing with the Tide until late August. It was announced in late September 2011 that Carter would not play that season and would instead take a redshirt. He was suspended for spring practice that year, which prompted him to take his leave of Tuscaloosa and officially transfer to FAU.

=== Florida Atlantic ===
Carter transferred to Florida Atlantic (FAU) for his senior season in 2012, but his petition to play immediately was turned down.

== Professional career ==
=== Montreal Alouettes (first stint) ===
After going undrafted in 2013, Carter had a tryout for the Minnesota Vikings but was not offered a contract. On June 23, 2013, Carter signed with the Montreal Alouettes of the Canadian Football League and joined the practice roster. On August 24, 2013, he made his CFL debut against the BC Lions. Carter played in 12 of the 18 regular season games with the Als and 1 playoff game in the 2013 CFL season. He had an outstanding first season in the CFL, amassing 909 yards (over 75 yards per game) and 5 touchdowns. His second season in the CFL would prove to be equally as impressive as his first. Carter appeared in 15 of the 18 regular season games, as well as 2 playoff games. He finished the season with 1,030 receiving yards on 75 catches, with 7 touchdowns. Carter also returned a missed field goal 123 yards for a touchdown. In the 2014 playoffs, he totaled 5 receptions for 43 yards with a touchdown during two games. During a loss to Hamilton in the East Final, Carter ended up melting down, receiving a pair of penalties for punching an opposing player and making contact with an official. During the off-season, Carter worked at a law office in Florida.

=== Indianapolis Colts ===
Carter originally planned to hold a Pro Day for all NFL teams to attend in early January 2015, an idea which was later scrubbed in favor of personal meetings/workouts with various NFL teams. The first four teams with which Carter had meetings and workouts for were the Minnesota Vikings, Tampa Bay Buccaneers, Kansas City Chiefs and the Indianapolis Colts. Carter also had a workout with the Carolina Panthers on January 14, 2015. Other NFL clubs that expressed their interest in the wide-out included the San Francisco 49ers, Cleveland Browns and Tennessee Titans. On January 25, NFL.com reported that the Colts were the frontrunners to sign Carter. Two days later, several sources reported that Carter had agreed to sign a contract with the Colts. It was also reported that, contrary to earlier reports, Carter could sign with an NFL team immediately due to an agreement with the Alouettes, rather than wait until February 10 when he officially became a free agent.

On February 2, 2015, the Colts announced that Carter had signed a 3-year, $1.575 million contract with the team. Only $25,000 of his contract was guaranteed for 2015, and he did not receive a signing bonus.

On September 5, 2015, the Indianapolis Colts announced they had cut Carter from the team. He signed to the Colts' practice squad on September 6. After the season ended, Carter was not signed to a future/reserve contract by Indianapolis, and became a free agent on January 12, 2016.

=== Montreal Alouettes (second stint) ===
On January 23, 2016, Carter signed a one-year contract with the Montreal Alouettes. On June 30, 2016, Carter was ejected from a game following a touchdown celebration that would result in Ottawa Redblacks head coach Rick Campbell being knocked down. Carter would also be fined by General Manager and Head Coach Jim Popp for the incident for an undisclosed amount. Carter was subsequently suspended for one game by the CFL. On July 7, 2016, the CFLPA announced that they had filed an appeal of Duron Carter's one-game suspension, believed to be on the grounds that Carter suffered a concussion on the touchdown reception and was thus his judgment was impaired for the subsequent interaction with the Redblacks bench. Carter was eligible to play until the conclusion of the appeal. On August 17 the appeal went before an independent arbitrator who delayed a verdict until after the Alouettes' Week 9 match against the Ottawa Redblacks later that week. Heading into Week 11 the arbitrator upheld Duron Carter's one-game suspension, meaning Carter would miss the third and final regular season matchup against Ottawa. Rakeem Cato was named the starting quarterback for their Week 12 game, and in his first practice as the starting quarterback Cato and Carter got into a heated argument. A little over a week later Cato once again got into a heated argument at practice with Carter, this time also involving Carter's cousin, fellow wide receiver Kenny Stafford. Following their Week 17 loss to the Stampeders Carter was released from the Montreal Alouettes, only three weeks from the end of the season, along with Stafford. Carter would finish his 2016 season having played in 14 games catching 61 passes for 938 yards with 5 touchdowns. He also blocked a punt and returned it for a touchdown.

In late November 2016 TSN correspondent Gary Lawless reported that Carter had narrowed down his options down to three West Division teams; the Edmonton Eskimos, Saskatchewan Roughriders, and the Calgary Stampeders. On December 29, 2016, it was reported that Carter was willing to return to the Alouettes following the mutual departure of general manager Jim Popp. That never occurred, and Carter remained a free agent.

=== Saskatchewan Roughriders ===
Carter with the Saskatchewan Roughriders in 2017

On January 26, 2017, Carter signed with the Saskatchewan Roughriders (CFL). Carter's 2017 salary, which became fully guaranteed partway into the season was worth around 130,000 CAD. The 2017 season saw Carter set a career high in receiving yards for a single season with 1,043. After a slow start to the season Carter produced a 9 catch, 131 yard game against Toronto during week 6 which included the consensus CFL catch of the year, one of the two touchdowns Carter scored during the 38–27 win. Other highlights included returning a blocked convert kick 113 yards for a two-point score against Edmonton in week 10. In Week 17, Carter also set a new single game career high with 231 receiving yards on 11 receptions. Due to an increasing number of injuries to the Riders cornerbacks Carter began practicing as a defensive back in practice. On October 20, 2017, Carter started the game as a cornerback, recording two defensive tackles, one for loss and one interception, which he returned 37-yards for a touchdown. For his efforts he was named a Top Performer for Week 17. The Roughriders made the playoffs as a crossover team, and Carter recorded 11 catches for 150 yards and a score during the two games played. He also was the target for a pass which was intercepted by Cassius Vaughn during the CFL East final game, which the Roughriders lost to Toronto. On January 22, 2018, Carter signed a one-year contract extension with the Roughriders: He was slated to become a free agent in February 2018. Carter's salary for 2018, including potential playtime bonuses, increased to 175,000 Canadian Dollars. Several days later, news broke that Carter was facing two cannabis related charges, which the Roughriders were not aware of.

During the 2018 season, Carter started out at receiver, but injuries caused head coach Chris Jones to switch Carter back to defensive duty after just one week. Despite recording a second interception returned for a touchdown, Carter was beaten on three plays, giving up valuable yardage at inopportune times and one touchdown, in addition to committing penalties. Despite these struggles by Carter, and an anemic offense during the two Carter played on defense, Jones insisted that Carter would remain at defensive back. Following a total of 5 games as a starting corner, and after the return of Nick Marshall to the defense, Carter was switched back to his receiver role, making an immediate impact by catching a 41-yard touchdown in his first and only game back on full-time offense. However, on August 11, during a bye week, Carter was released by the Riders. The timing of the release meant that the Roughriders were not responsible for the remainder of Carter's salary.

Immediately following his release there were four teams rumored to be interested in signing Carter – the Toronto Argonauts, Hamilton Tiger-Cats, BC Lions and Montreal Alouettes . However, in the following days both the Lions and Alouettes announced they were no longer interested in signing Carter.

=== Toronto Argonauts ===
On August 26, 2018, Carter signed with the Toronto Argonauts, reuniting with Jim Popp, who originally brought Carter into the CFL five years prior when Popp was general manager for the Montreal Alouettes. The 2018 season saw Carter's lowest receiving output of his 5-year CFL career, largely due to playing defense for 5 games with Saskatchewan, spending several weeks without a team, and slowly being phased into the new Toronto playbook. Other factors include contributing as a returner on special teams, and playing with 5 different quarterbacks during the season; Zach Collaros, Brandon Bridge, and David Watford of the Roughriders, and McLeod Bethel-Thompson and James Franklin of the Argonauts all completed at least one pass to Carter. During the offseason, Carter stated he would consider retirement if a new collective bargaining agreement was not reached by the beginning of free agency on February 12, 2019.

=== BC Lions ===
Upon entering free agency, Carter signed a one-year contract with the BC Lions on February 13, 2019. The 2019 season under first year head coach DeVone Claybrooks ended in the Leos missing out on the playoffs, a season ending injury to high priced free agent quarterback Mike Reilly, and a perceived lack of offensive chemistry, especially among the receivers. Carter was unable to replicate his past status as a deep threat, becoming most often used on bubble screens. Carter's most notable plays were a pair of trick play deep passes, both resulting in completions for a combined 123 yards and a touchdown, Carter's first score as a passer. He was, however, released by the team after the organization registered a 5–13 season, four of those five wins coming against the Ottawa Redblacks (3–15) and Toronto Argonauts (4–14), the two lone teams with a lower win percentage than the BC Lions in 2019.

=== Edmonton Elks ===
The 2020 CFL season was cancelled due to the COVID-19 pandemic and Carter did not play anywhere in 2021. On February 14, 2022, it was announced that he had signed with the Edmonton Elks to play as a defensive back with Chris Jones' defence. He played in ten regular season games where he recorded 16 defensive tackles and one interception. He was released on December 1, 2022.

== CFL receiving statistics ==
Receiving		Regular season						Playoffs
Year	Team	Games	Rec.	Yards	Avg	Long	TD	Games	Rec.	Yards	Avg	Long	TD
2013	MTL	11	49	909	18.6	71	5	1	2	32	16.0	29	1
2014	MTL	15	75	1,030	13.7	64	7	2	5	43	8.6	16	1
2016	MTL	14	61	938	15.4	67	5	Released
2017	SSK	18	73	1,043	14.3	88	8	2	11	150	13.6	35	1
2018	SSK	7	8	111	13.9	41	1	Not with team
2018	TOR	8	10	119	11.9	21	1	Did not qualify
2019	BC	18	67	614	9.2	32	3	Did not qualify
CFL totals		91	343	4,764	13.9	88	30	5	18	225	12.5	35	3
