= Noel Thorpe =

Professional Canadian football coach

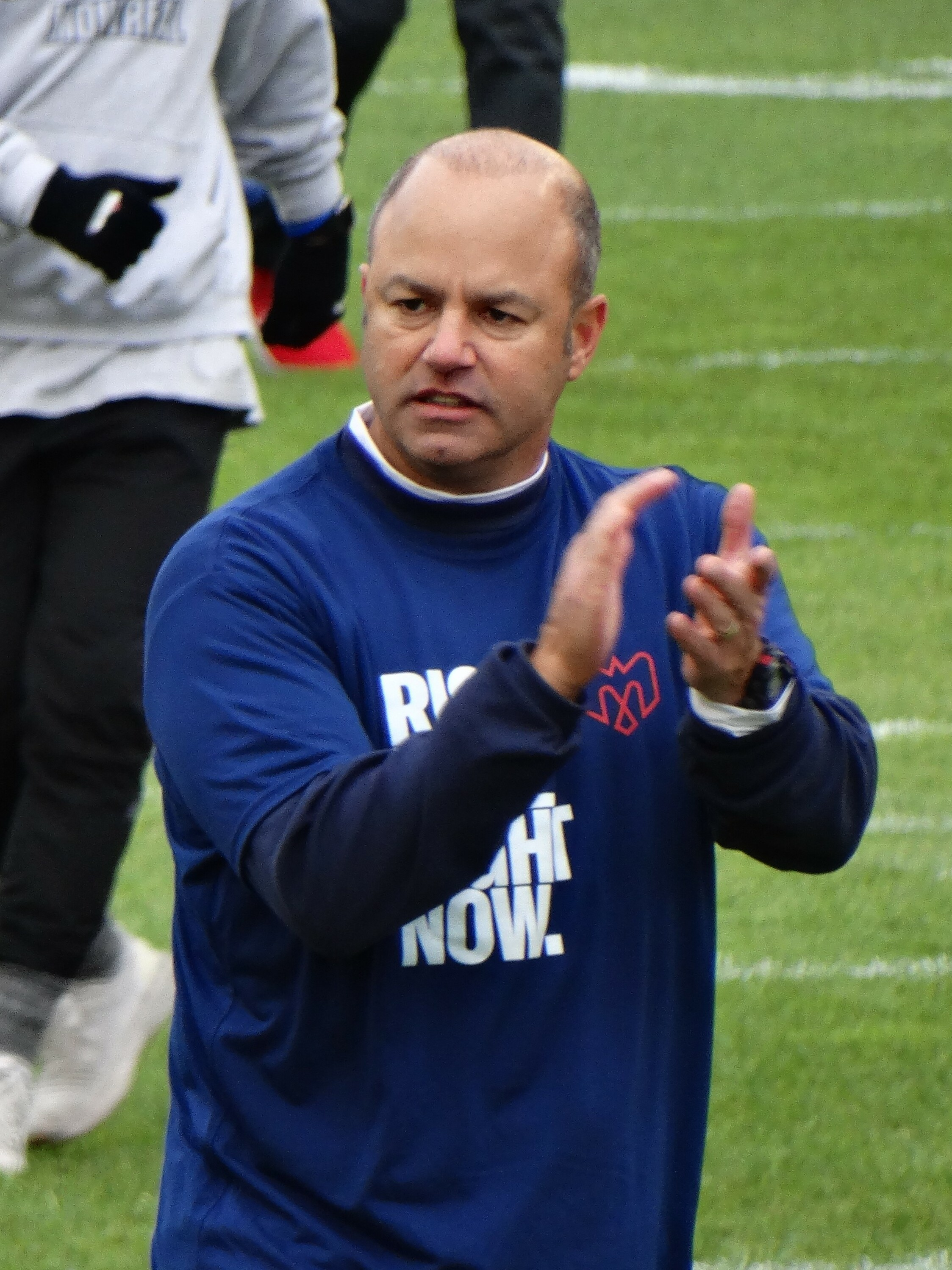
- Thorpe with the Montreal Alouettes in 2022

Profile
- Positions: Defensive coordinator, defensive backs coach

Personal information
- Born: 1970 (age 55–56); Vancouver, British Columbia, Canada

Career information
- College: St. Cloud State

Career history
- 1996–2000: UBC Thunderbirds (Defensive coordinator, defensive backs coach)
- 2001: Simon Fraser Clan (Defensive backs coach)
- 2002–2007: Montreal Alouettes (Special teams coordinator)
- 2003–2007: Montreal Alouettes (Defensive backs coach)
- 2008–2010: Edmonton Eskimos (Special teams coordinator, defensive backs coach)
- 2009–2010: Edmonton Eskimos (Assistant head coach)
- 2011: Montreal Carabins (Special teams coordinator)
- 2012: Canadian national junior team (Head coach)
- 2012: Montreal Carabins (Defensive coordinator)
- 2013–2017: Montreal Alouettes (Defensive coordinator)
- 2014–2017: Montreal Alouettes (Assistant head coach)
- 2018–2019: Ottawa Redblacks (Defensive coordinator)
- 2020–2021: Edmonton Elks (Defensive coordinator)
- 2022–2026: Montreal Alouettes (Defensive coordinator, defensive backs coach)

Awards and highlights
- 2× Grey Cup champion (2002, 2023); Vanier Cup champion (1997); IFAF U-19 World Cup champion (2012)

Noel Thorpe is a professional Canadian football coach who was most recently the defensive coordinator for the Montreal Alouettes of the Canadian Football League (CFL). He is a Grey Cup, Vanier Cup, and IFAF World Cup champion. He played college football for the St. Cloud State Huskies.

== Coaching career ==
=== Early college career ===
Thorpe began his coaching career with the UBC Thunderbirds of the CIAU in 1996 as the program's defensive coordinator and defensive backs coach. Shortly thereafter, in 1997, he earned his first Vanier Cup win as a coach for the 33rd Vanier Cup championship team. He remained with the Thunderbirds for five years until he joined the cross-town Simon Fraser Clan of the NAIA in 2001 as the team's defensive backs coach.

=== Montreal Alouettes ===
Thorpe was hired by the Montreal Alouettes in 2002 as the special teams coordinator and won his first Grey Cup championship in his first season following a victory in the 90th Grey Cup game. In 2003, he also became the defensive backs coach of the team. He continued in both positions through to the 2007 season where the Alouettes made four Grey Cup appearances in six years.

=== Edmonton Eskimos ===
Following an Alouettes' head coaching change prior to the 2008 season, Thorpe joined the Edmonton Eskimos in the same capacity as their special team coordinator and defensive backs coach. In the following season, Richie Hall was hired as the team's head coach and Thorpe added the title of assistant head coach. At the end of a disappointing 2010 season, one in which the team's general manager, Danny Maciocia, was fired, Hall was also relieved of his duties as head coach. The team's new head coach, Kavis Reed, dismissed Thorpe from the team on December 15, 2010.

=== Montreal Carabins ===
After a ten-year absence from college football, Thorpe was named the special teams coordinator for the Montreal Carabins on February 4, 2011. The move back to the city of Montreal reunited him with Maciocia who was now the Carabins' head coach. For the 2012 season, Thorpe was promoted to be the team's defensive coordinator.

=== Montreal Alouettes (II) ===
After two years with the Carabins, Thorpe re-joined the Alouettes on November 28, 2012, this time in the capacity of defensive coordinator. The team's first-year head coach, Dan Hawkins, was fired after five games and replaced by general manager, Jim Popp. At the end of the 2013 season, on December 4, 2013, Thorpe signed a two-year contract extension and added the title of assistant head coach, despite a permanent head coach not being hired yet (Tom Higgins would be hired over two months later).

While the Alouettes made the playoffs in 2014 after beginning the season with a 1–7 record, another slow start to the 2015 season led to the team dismissing Higgins and replacing him with Popp. It was the third such instance that Thorpe had been on the coaching staff of the Alouettes while Popp took over interim head coaching duties. At the end of the 2015 season, Popp announced that he would remain as the team's head coach for the 2016 season. Soon after, Thorpe submitted his resignation to join the Edmonton Eskimos as their defensive coordinator, but the move was blocked by league commissioner, Jeffrey Orridge, on December 17, 2015, since there were two years remaining on his contract. After re-conciliation, it was announced by Thorpe and the Alouettes that he would remain with the team and fulfill his contractual obligations.

During the 2016 season, Popp resigned as head coach and was replaced by Jacques Chapdelaine, the team's receivers coach, rather than Thorpe or Kavis Reed, who were the team's assistant head coaches. Chapdelaine was named the team's head coach for the 2017 season while Reed was promoted to the team's general manager position vacated by Popp. The team once again struggled and, after a 3–8 start to the season, Thorpe and Chapdelaine were fired on September 13, 2017. The Alouettes were winless in their final seven games that year without Thorpe.

=== Ottawa Redblacks ===
On December 4, 2017, Thorpe was named the defensive coordinator for the Ottawa Redblacks. He spent two years with the Redblacks, with the first yielding an appearance in the 106th Grey Cup, and the next with the Redblacks finishing with the worst record in the league. After Ottawa's head coach, Rick Campbell, announced his resignation at the conclusion of the 2019 season, Thorpe was not retained by the Redblacks.

=== Edmonton Eskimos (II) ===
On January 15, 2020, it was announced that Thorpe had re-joined the Eskimos, this time as the team's defensive coordinator, after a 10-year absence. The CFL did not play in 2020, but he coached the newly named Elks in 2021. After the team hired Chris Jones as head coach, he announced on January 13, 2022, that he would also serve as the team's defensive coordinator and that Thorpe would not be retained.

=== Montreal Alouettes (III) ===
On July 6, 2022, it was announced that Thorpe had been hired as the defensive coordinator and defensive backs coach for the Montreal Alouettes, replacing the fired Barron Miles. In early December 2022, it was reported that Thorpe was one of five finalists for the vacant Alouettes head coaching job. After staying with the team as defensive coordinator, he won his second Grey Cup championship in 2023. After back-to-back Grey Cup losses in 2025 and 2026, Thorpe was dismissed from his position on November 20, 2026.

== Personal life ==
Thorpe and his wife, Erminia Russo, have two children, Emma and Peyton. Their family had been living in Montreal since Thorpe's time with the Carabins and continued while he was working for the Ottawa Redblacks.
