= Kelowna Secondary School =

Location
- 1079 Raymer Avenue; Kelowna, British Columbia, V1Y 4Z7; Canada; 49.86395°N 119.4783°W

Information
- Other name: École Kelowna Secondary
- School type: Public, high school
- Opened: 1939
- School district: School District 23 Central Okanagan
- School number: 2323076
- Principal: Jim Lairdr
- Vice Principal (Student Last Name A-G): Julie Loveridge-Marks
- Vice Principal (Student Last Name H-N): Jeff Prasad
- Vice Principal (Student Last Name O-Z): Michael Kormany
- Staff: 90
- Grades: 10–12
- Enrollment: 1891 (2025-2026)
  - Grade 10: 598
  - Grade 11: 608
  - Grade 12: 613
  - Other: 72
- Language: English, French
- Colours: Black and Gold
- Song: Whose House
- Athletics: Multiple
- Mascot: Owl
- Team name: Owls
- Website: www.kss.sd23.bc.ca
- Last updated: October 3, 2026

Kelowna Secondary School is a public school in Kelowna, British Columbia within School District 23.

== Academics ==
Kelowna Secondary School was rated 3rd in the province by the 2004/05 Fraser Sand rankings.

KSS received a 7 out of 10 overall rating from the Fraser Institute in 2020. It was ranked 63/252 out of high schools in British Columbia.

== Athletics ==
Kelowna Secondary School offers senior varsity boys volleyball and basketball programs.

=== Basketball ===
Kelowna Secondary BC AAA Basketball Provincial Championship Games
Year	Winning Team		Losing Team	
2016	Kelowna Owls	87	Tamanawis Wildcats	57
2017	Walnut Grove Gators	78	Kelowna Owls	65
2019	Lord Tweedsmuir Panthers	91	Kelowna Owls	86
2020	Burnaby South Rebels	70	Kelowna Owls	56

=== Volleyball ===
Kelowna Secondary is known as one of the provincial championship contenders through recent years in high school boys' volleyball. In the 2023 volleyball season, the Owls completed a provincial title three-peat with a victory in four sets against the Yale Lions from Abbotsford; in the same season, the Owls' Senior Girls Volleyball Team won the 'AAAA' High School Girls Volleyball Provincial Championship in three sets against the Riverside Rapids from Port Coquitlam.

== Arts ==
Kelowna Secondary School offers various Drama and Music programs.

=== Night Owl Theatre ===
KSS offers a theatre program with courses in and outside of the timetable. They have their own theatre company, "Night Owl Theatre", which produces several productions a year.

=== KSS Music Department ===
KSS offers music classes and groups for Concert Bands, Jazz Bands, Men's & Women's Chamber Choirs, Vocal Jazz Ensemble, Jazz Combos and Music Composition & Theory.

== Notable alumni ==
- Jerod Zaleski, Montreal Alouettes player
- Taylor Loffler, Winnipeg Blue Bombers player
- Dianne Watts, Former Mayor of Surrey, BC
- Kevin Kane, musician and member of The Grapes of Wrath (band)
- Tom Hooper and Chris Hooper, musicians and members of The Grapes of Wrath and Ginger
- Nava Ashraf, economist
- Ben Cotton, actor
- Alix Hawley, author and winner of 2015 Amazon.ca First Novel Award
- Naben Ruthnum, author and winner of 2013 Journey Prize
- Paul Johansson, One Tree Hill (TV Series) actor
- Lee Tockar, voice actor for animations such as Barbie (film series) as Bibble or Johnny Test as Bling-bling Boy.
- Jared Young, Major League Baseball player
