= Mathieu Boulay =

Canadian football player (born 1987)

No. 77
- Position: Defensive lineman

Personal information
- Born: November 23, 1987 (age 38); Montreal, Quebec, Canada
- Listed height: 6 ft 2 in (1.88 m)
- Listed weight: 250 lb (113 kg)

Career information
- University: Bishop's

Career history
- 2011: Saskatchewan Roughriders
- 2013: Montreal Alouettes*
- 2013: Winnipeg Blue Bombers
- 2014–2015: Edmonton Eskimos
- * Offseason or practice squad member only

Awards and highlights
- Grey Cup champion (2015)
- Stats at CFL.ca (archive)

Mathieu Boulay (born November 23, 1987) is a Canadian former professional football defensive lineman who played for the Saskatchewan Roughriders, Winnipeg Blue Bombers, and Edmonton Eskimos of the Canadian Football League (CFL). He played CIS football at Bishop's.

== University career ==
Boulay was a member of the Bishop's Gaiters for four years from 2007 until 2010. He was named the team's lineman of the year his senior season, along with being recognized as the Defensive MVP. As well he was named Most Outstanding Defensive Lineman in the 2010 East-West Shrine Game. Despite his efforts, Boulay went undrafted in the 2011 CFL draft.

== Professional career ==
=== Saskatchewan Roughriders ===
Boulay signed a free agent deal with the Saskatchewan Roughriders in May, 2011. He was released on June 25.

=== Montreal Alouettes ===
Boulay was signed by the Montreal Alouettes on June 1, 2013. He was released June 9, 2013.

=== Winnipeg Blue Bombers ===
Boulay signed with the Winnipeg Blue Bombers on July 22, 2013. In 5 games, he recorded 3 special teams tackle. He was released on January 31, 2014.

=== Edmonton Eskimos ===
Boulay signed with the Edmonton Eskimos on February 5, 2014. He recorded 4 special teams tackles.

Edmonton Eskimos 2015 :

Boulay recorded 14 special teams tackles, 4 Defensive tackles 1 sack. He also recorded two tackles and one forced fumble in playoffs

== Personal life ==
Mathieu's brother Nicolas Boulay is also a professional football player in the Canadian Football League.
