= Tyrell Sutton =

American football player (born 1986)

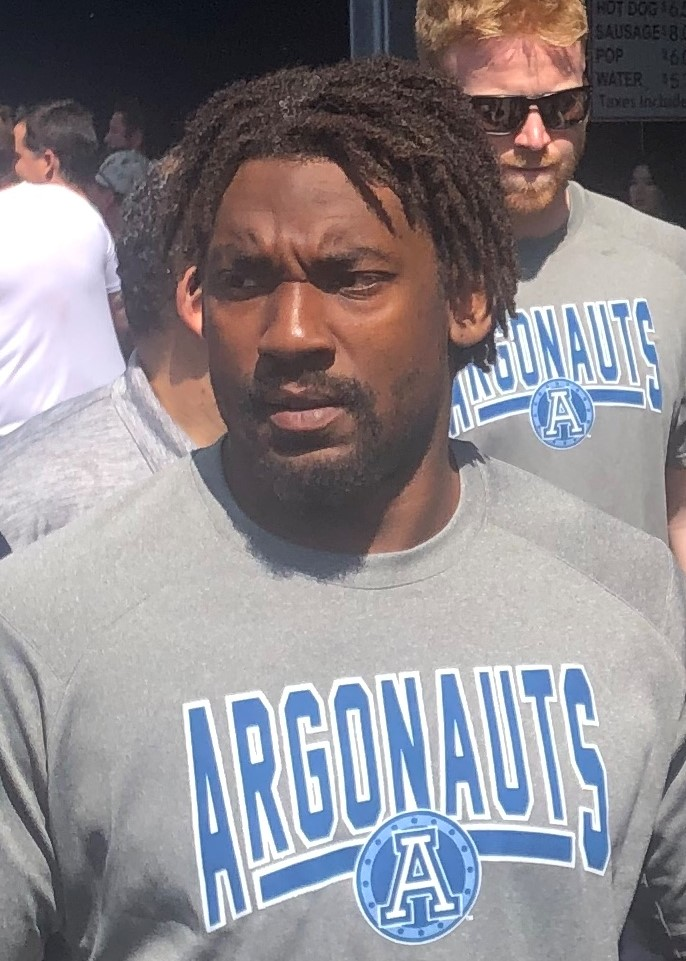
- Sutton with the Toronto Argonauts in 2019

Profile
- Position: Running back

Personal information
- Born: December 19, 1986 (age 39); Akron, Ohio, U.S.
- Listed height: 5 ft 9 in (1.75 m)
- Listed weight: 190 lb (86 kg)

Career information
- College: Northwestern

Career history

Playing
- 2009: Green Bay Packers*
- 2009–2011: Carolina Panthers
- 2012: Seattle Seahawks*
- 2012: Sacramento Mountain Lions
- 2013–2018: Montreal Alouettes
- 2018: BC Lions
- 2019: Toronto Argonauts
- 2019: Hamilton Tiger-Cats
- 2020: Montreal Alouettes*
- * Offseason or practice squad member only

Coaching
- 2023: Montreal Alouettes (RB)

Awards and highlights
- Grey Cup champion (2023); CFL All-Star (2015); CFL East All-Star (2015); Second-team All-Big Ten (2005); Big Ten Freshman of the Year (2005); SN Freshman All-American (2005); SN Off. Freshman of the Year (2005)

Career NFL statistics
- Rushing attempts: 25
- Rushing yards: 139
- Receptions: 18
- Receiving yards: 132
- Stats at Pro Football Reference
- Stats at CFL.ca

Tyrell DelShawn Sutton (born December 19, 1986) is an American former professional football player who was a running back in the National Football League (NFL) and Canadian Football League (CFL). He was signed by the Green Bay Packers as an undrafted free agent in 2009. He played college football for the Northwestern Wildcats. Sutton was also a member of the Carolina Panthers and Seattle Seahawks of the NFL, the Sacramento Mountain Lions of the United Football League (UFL), and the BC Lions, Toronto Argonauts, Hamilton Tiger-Cats, and Montreal Alouettes of the CFL.

== Early life ==
Sutton is the son of Connie and Anthony Sutton Sr. His brother, Tony, played football at The College of Wooster.

Sutton attended Archbishop Hoban High. While attending, he rushed for 9,426 yards, which makes him second in all time rushing yards per career in Ohio. Also, his career high of 505 yards in one game is the fourth most in Ohio history. Furthermore, Sutton broke the school rushing record three times.

Awards

- 2004 Mr. Football Award
- 2004 Team and Offensive MVP
- Two-time Akron Beacon Journal Player of the Year
- Two-time first-team All-State selection

== College career ==
While attending Northwestern University, he majored in Communications.

As a freshman, Sutton rushed for 1,474 yards and 16 touchdowns. His rushing total was the third highest in Northwestern's history. He fell one game short of joining Emmitt Smith, Marshall Faulk, and Adrian Peterson as the only NCAA freshman players to achieve 1,000 yards in 7 games. In addition to rushing, he caught 44 passes for 396 yards and 2 touchdowns. His freshman year awards included the Sporting News' Offensive Freshman of the Year and first-team Freshman All-American and Big Ten Freshman of the Year.

Although injured as a sophomore, he rushed for 1,000 yards and 5 touchdowns and caught 40 passes for 261 yards and 2 touchdowns. He was the team co-MVP and had an honorable mention at the All-Big Ten selection.

Because of a lower-leg injury early in his junior year, he played in only 5 games, and rushed for only 522 yards and 2 touchdowns, with 30 pass receptions for 282 yards.

As a senior, Sutton rushed for 776 yards and 6 touchdowns before a wrist injury sidelined him for the rest of the 2008 season. Sutton underwent surgery on October 28 and returned as the starting back for the Wildcats in the Alamo Bowl. He rushed for 114 yards in that game to bring his total to 890 yards. In addition, he caught 30 passes for 305 yards and 2 touchdowns.

Sutton concluded his career as the second all-time leading rusher at Northwestern with 3,886 yards, and second all-time with 5,138 all-purpose yards. Sutton is also the second player in Wildcat's history to achieve 1,000 receiving and rushing yards. Furthermore, his 149 receptions for 1,244 yards is the most for any back.

== Professional career ==
Pre-draft measurables
Height	Weight	40-yard dash	20-yard shuttle	Three-cone drill	Vertical jump	Broad jump
5 ft 8 in (1.73 m)	211 lb (96 kg)	4.75 s	4.32 s	6.94 s	33 in (0.84 m)	9 ft 6 in (2.90 m)
All values from NFL Combine

=== Green Bay Packers ===
Though he was invited to the NFL Combine, he was not drafted. On May 1, 2009, the Green Bay Packers signed him as an undrafted free agent. On September 5, 2009, he was released when the Packers trimmed their roster to 53 players.

=== Carolina Panthers ===
Although the Packers intended to re-sign Sutton to the practice squad if he cleared waivers, Sutton was claimed by the Carolina Panthers on September 6, 2009. Sutton played 16 games for Carolina over two seasons, and put up 139 yards on 25 carries for an impressive 5.6 average. He also returned kick-offs for the Panthers, but was cut from the team on September 3, 2011

=== Seattle Seahawks ===
On January 4, 2012, Sutton signed a reserve/future contract with the Seattle Seahawks. On August 26, 2012, the Seahawks released Sutton as they trimmed their roster from 90 to 75 players in preparation for the 2012 season.

=== Montreal Alouettes ===
Sutton signed with the Montreal Alouettes of the Canadian Football League, and began playing for them in August 2013, early in the 2013 CFL season. In his first season in the CFL Sutton played in 8 of the 18 regular season games, totaling 342 yards on 55 carries (6.3 yards per carry) with 3 rushing touchdowns: He also contributed 156 receiving yards. In the Al's only playoff game that year Sutton had a monster game, rushing for 142 yards on 21 carries. In the following season, Sutton played in 10 of the 18 regular season games for the Alouettes. His carries increased from 55 to 96, with 500 rushing yards, but his rushing averaged dipped to 5.2 yards per carry. Following the season Sutton and the Al's agreed to a 3-year contract extension.

2015 was a breakout season for Tyrell Sutton as he eclipsed the 1000 yard mark (1,059) on 180 carries with 5 rushing touchdowns. His efforts were good enough to lead the league in rushing yards, edging out Andrew Harris by 20 yards. Sutton began the 2016 season as the team's leading rusher, but sustained an injury early in the season resulting in him being placed on the 6-game injured list. He wound up only playing in seven games in 2016, rushing for 412 yards on 74 attempts (5.6 avg). Sutton played most of the 2017 season and regained his status as Montreal's number one running back, carrying the ball 152 times for 843 yards with 5 touchdowns. Following the season the team and Sutton agreed to a one-year extension. In total, he played six seasons for the Alouettes (69 games) and recorded 643 carries for 3,573 rushing yards and 15 rushing touchdowns along with 173 receptions for 1,507 receiving yards and three receiving touchdowns.

=== BC Lions ===
On September 25, 2018, Montreal traded Tyrell Sutton and the Alouettes' third-round draft pick in the 2019 CFL draft for the BC Lions' second-round draft pick in the 2019 CFL draft. This effectively demoted incumbent Jeremiah Johnson as Sutton took over as the lead back for the remaining 4 regular season games, and one playoff game.

=== Toronto Argonauts ===
Sutton signed with the Toronto Argonauts for the 2019 season on the second day of free agency on February 13, 2019. At the beginning of the season, he spent four weeks on the injured list before being released on July 10, 2019.

=== Hamilton Tiger-Cats ===
Sutton signed onto the Hamilton Tiger-Cats' practice roster on September 9, 2019. During his four games played with Hamilton, Sutton managed to pass the 4,000 career rushing mark, and caught all 11 of his targets for 126 yards and a touchdown. In the playoffs, Sutton was the most effective rusher for Hamilton with 11 carries for 86 yards in a losing effort.

=== Montreal Alouettes (II) ===
After becoming a free agent, Sutton signed with the Montreal Alouettes on February 19, 2020. He announced his retirement on March 11, 2021.

== Coaching career ==
On February 28, 2023, the Alouettes announced they had hired Sutton as their running backs coach for the 2023 season. That year, the Alouettes finished with an 11–7 record and a victory in the 110th Grey Cup game, giving Sutton his first Grey Cup championship. However, he was not retained on the coaching staff for 2024.

== CFL statistics ==
Year	Team	GP	Carries	Yards	TDs	Avg	Long	Rec	Yards	TDs
2013	MTL	12	55	342	3	6.2	20	14	156	0
2014	MTL	12	96	500	1	5.2	24	15	190	0
2015	MTL	15	180	1,059	5	5.9	54	43	334	2
2016	MTL	7	74	412	0	5.6	27	27	206	0
2017	MTL	14	152	843	5	5.5	43	44	312	1
2018	MTL	9	86	417	1	4.8	44	30	309	0
2018	BC	4	55	268	2	4.9	31	5	32	0
2019	HAM	4	35	203	0	5.8	19	11	126	1
Total		77	733	4,044	17	5.5	54	189	1,665	4
