= Bo Adebayo =

Canadian football player (born 1988)

Profile
- Position: Defensive end

Personal information
- Born: March 25, 1988 (age 38); Edmonton, Alberta
- Listed height: 6 ft 4 in (1.93 m)
- Listed weight: 268 lb (122 kg)

Career information
- College: Western Kentucky
- CFL draft: 2012: 3rd round, 18th overall pick

Career history
- 2012–2014: Montreal Alouettes
- 2014: Edmonton Eskimos
- Stats at CFL.ca (archive)

Bo Omoniyi Adebayo (born March 25, 1988, in Edmonton, Alberta) is a Canadian football defensive lineman formerly of the Edmonton Eskimos of the Canadian Football League. He played college football for the Western Kentucky Hilltoppers.

== Professional career ==
=== Montreal Alouettes ===
Adebayo was selected 18th overall by the Montreal Alouettes in the 2012 CFL draft and was signed by the team on May 24, 2012.

=== Edmonton Eskimos ===
Adebayo was signed off the Montreal Alouettes' practice roster by the Edmonton Eskimos on September 30, 2014.
