= Jim Popp =

American sports executive

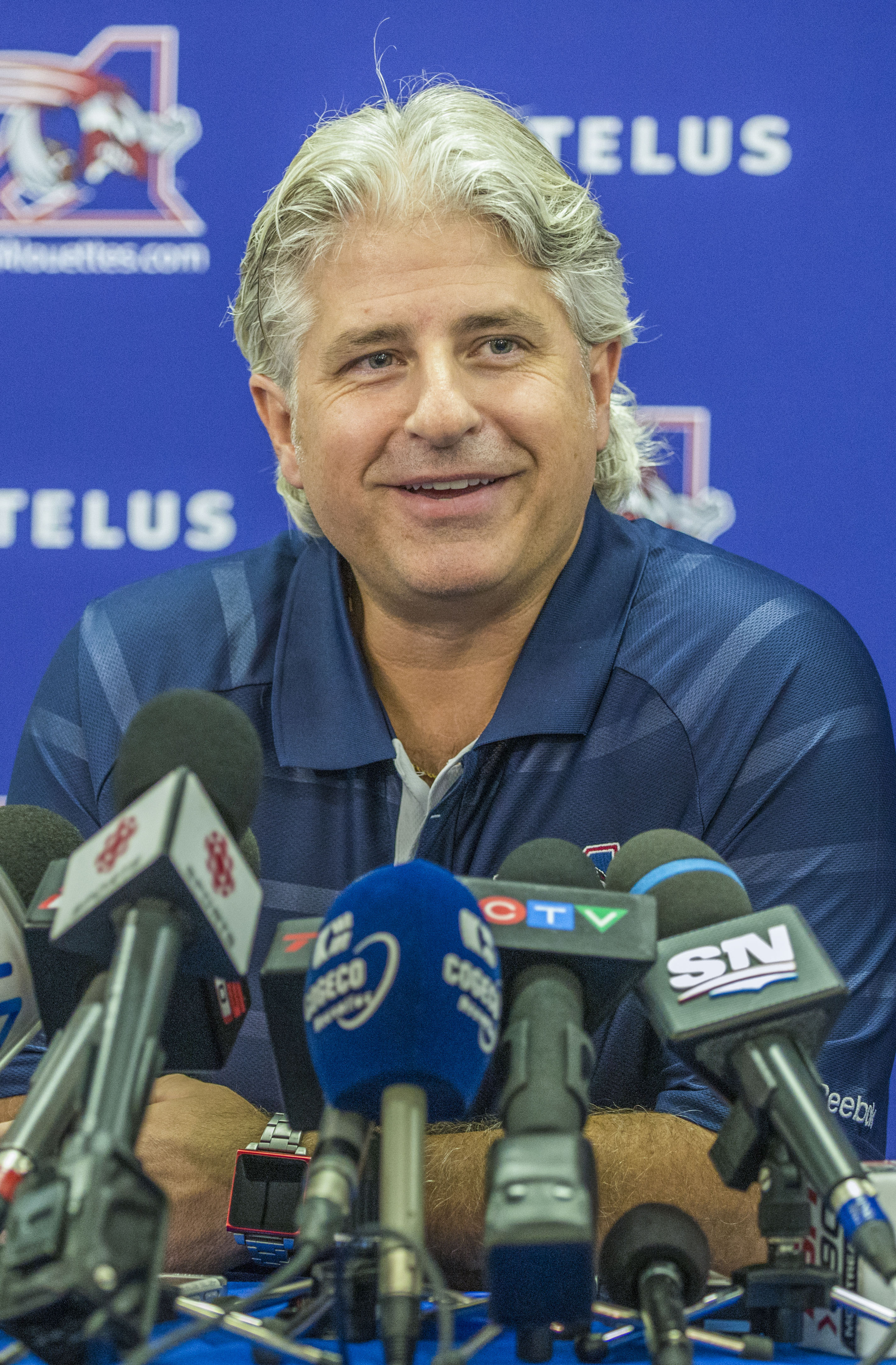
- Popp in front of media at a press conference

Ottawa Redblacks
- Title: Senior football advisor

Personal information
- Born: December 21, 1964 (age 61); Elkin, North Carolina, U.S.

Career information
- Positions: Wide receiver, defensive back
- High school: Mooresville (Mooresville, North Carolina)
- College: Michigan State (1983–1985)

Career history

Coaching
- Michigan State (1986) (asst.); North Carolina (1987) (asst.); The Citadel (1988–1990) (QB, RB, WR); Raleigh-Durham Skyhawks (1991) (WR, STC, S&C); Saskatchewan Roughriders (1992–1993) (WR); Montreal Alouettes (2001, 2006–2007, 2013, 2015) (HC); Alabama State (2020–2021) (AHC, RB)

Operations
- PSFL (1991–1992) (Director of player personnel); Saskatchewan Roughriders (1992–1993) (Director of player personnel); Baltimore Stallions (1994–1995) (GM, director of player personnel); Montreal Alouettes (1996–2016) (VP, GM, director of FB opts, director of player personnel); Toronto Argonauts (2017–2019) (GM); UNC Charlotte (2021) (Chief of staff, advisor to head coach); UFL (2022–2025) (Vice president, player personnel; director of player administration); Ottawa Redblacks (2026–present) (Senior football advisor)

Awards and highlights
- 5× Grey Cup champion (1995, 2002, 2009, 2010, 2017)

James Thomas Popp (born December 21, 1964) is an American sports executive and coach who is a senior football advisor for the Ottawa Redblacks of the Canadian Football League (CFL). He most notably spent 21 years as general manager of the Montreal Alouettes, including several stints as head coach. He had one of the longest stints as a general manager in sports. The Alouettes had the second highest win percentage of any sport (#1 New England Patriots) during a decade run that saw the team appear in 8 Grey Cups over 11 seasons. In 2011, Popp was named Canada's Sports Executive of the Year.

Popp also served as general manager for two years with the Baltimore Stallions and three years with the Toronto Argonauts. He led three separate franchises to a total of five Grey Cup championship wins (1995 with the Baltimore Stallions; 2002, 2009, 2010 with the Montreal Alouettes; 2017 with the Toronto Argonauts) and his teams have appeared in 18 Divisional Championship games and 11 Grey Cups.

Popp was later the Vice President, Player Personnel, for the United States Football League (USFL).

== College career ==
=== Michigan State (1983–1986) ===
Popp earned a full athletic scholarship to Michigan State in football and baseball. He played defensive back and wide receiver during his football career under Nick Saban and Charlie Baggett. He suffered a knee injury early in his career, forcing him to change football positions and ending his baseball career. He played for the Spartans from 1983 to 1985 and was part of George Perles' first recruiting class, and was the first recruit to earn a degree and graduate in three-and-a-half years.

Due to his knee injury, Popp worked for Perles at Michigan State in 1986 as a graduate assistant coach, under Saban and Baggett's tutelage.

=== North Carolina (1987) ===
In 1987, he accepted a graduate assistant job at the University of North Carolina under Dick Crum. Popp assisted both the quarterbacks and running backs for Randy Walker and Lawson Holland.

=== The Citadel (1988–1990) ===
During Popp's three seasons at The Citadel from 1988 to 1990, he coached multiple positions—quarterbacks, running backs, and wide receivers—under Charlie Taaffe.

=== Alabama State (2020–2021) ===
In 2020, Popp accepted the job as Assistant Head Coach and Running Backs Coach at Alabama State University, a member of the SWAC, reuniting him with Don Hill-Eley from the Baltimore Stallions days. The SWAC Conference moved the 2020 playing season to the spring of 2021 due to Covid-19.

Popp resigned his position in the summer of 2021.

=== North Carolina at Charlotte (2021) ===
Popp joined Will Healy's staff at the University of North Carolina at Charlotte as Chief of Staff and Advisor to the Head Coach for the fall 2021 campaign.

== American pro football leagues ==
=== NFL Europe / World League of American Football (1991) ===
In 1991, he served as the wide receivers, special teams coordinator, and strength and conditioning coach for the Raleigh-Durham Skyhawks of the World League of American Football, led by Roman Gabriel.

=== Professional Spring Football League (1991–1992) ===
Before joining the CFL, Popp helped form a new pro football league called the Professional Spring Football League in 1991–1992, with which Popp served as the league’s director of player personnel and worked with former NFL coach Walt Michaels.

=== United States Football League/United Football League (2022–present) ===
Popp has joined the newly formed United States Football League (USFL). Popp has been named Vice President, Player Personnel and has served as Director of Player Administration. Popp still holds these positions with the current UFL after the USFL/XFL merger.

== Canadian Football League ==
=== Executive positions ===
==== Saskatchewan Roughriders (1992–1993) ====
Popp was the Saskatchewan Roughriders' Director of Player Personnel and Wide Receivers coach under Don Matthews in 1992–1993. The Roughriders appeared in the playoffs both years.

==== Baltimore Stallions (1994–1995) ====
Popp served as the General Manager and Director of Player Personnel of the Baltimore Stallions in 1994–1995. The Stallions reached the Grey Cup both years winning in 1995, and remain the only American team to have won the Grey Cup. The Stallions remain the only CFL team in its history to win 18 games in a season.

==== Montreal Alouettes (1996–2016) ====
After the National Football League added the Baltimore Ravens, Stallions owner Jim Speros decided to relocate his team to Montreal as the second incarnation of the Montreal Alouettes, and Popp was named Vice President, General Manager, Director of Football Operations, and Director of Player Personnel in January 1996. While the Alouettes were allowed to reclaim the legacy of the original 1946–86 Alouettes, they were not allowed to keep their history as the Stallions, while Popp had to rebuild the roster as the Stallions players were released from their contracts and 14 of those players were signed by the NFL, though Popp was able to re-sign several key players from Baltimore. The 1996 expansion Alouettes team went on to have a 12–6 record and appear in the Eastern Division Championship game.

Popp reached the East Division Championship 15 out of 21 seasons, the Grey Cup eight times (2000, 2002, 2003, 2005, 2006, 2008, 2009, 2010), three of which ended in victory (2002, 2009, 2010). He led the Alouettes to five consecutive seasons of 12 or more victories; the Alouettes are one of only three teams in CFL history to have accomplished that feat. Of the three CFL coaches in history to win back-to-back Coach of the Year honors, two did so working under Popp's time as general manager: Don Matthews in 1994–1995 and Taaffe in 1999–2000. Marc Trestman, one of Popp's head coaches in Montreal, made a direct crossover from the CFL to the NFL when he was hired by the Chicago Bears in 2013, the first head coach to make such a transition since Bud Grant went to the Minnesota Vikings in 1967.

==== Toronto Argonauts (2017–2019) ====
Popp was hired as the General Manager of the Toronto Argonauts on February 28, 2017. He took over a team that had lost 11 consecutive games the year prior and finished with a record of 5–13. Popp brought Marc Trestman in as the team's head coach; the GM/Head Coach duo had won consecutive Grey Cups together in 2009 and 2010, and had appeared in 3 straight championships working together in Montreal. Despite being hired after the free agency period had started two weeks earlier, Popp was able to make acquisitions with free agents such as former Montreal Alouettes player Bear Woods and trades with such players as former Montreal Alouettes player S. J. Green and WR Armanti Edwards. The team finished the regular season at 9-9, which was good enough for first place in the East and a first-round bye in the playoffs. The Argos defeated the crossover Saskatchewan Roughriders in the Eastern Final, and the Calgary Stampeders in the 105th Grey Cup CFL final. The Toronto Argonauts became the first team to go from worst to first in one season to win a championship.

Prior to the 2018 season, several players got into contract disputes with Popp and the team. Once the season began, the Argos got derailed quickly with a career-ending injury to starting quarterback Ricky Ray during the second game of the season. Popp had traded for prospect James Franklin from the Edmonton Eskimos in the off-season, with the hopes of him being the successor to Ray. Franklin's struggles led to Trestman benching him for third stringer McLeod Bethel-Thompson. The team finished the regular season at 4–14 and Trestman was fired at the end of the season. Popp hired Corey Chamblin, the defensive coordinator during the Argos' 2017 championship season to be the head coach in for the next year. However, the 2019 season again saw the team struggle, with Popp fired as GM prior to the season ending.

==== Ottawa Redblacks ====
On August 24, 2026, it was announced that Popp had been hired as a senior football advisor for the Ottawa Redblacks.

=== Head coaching ===
The majority of Popp's head coaching career in the Canadian Football League has been as an interim head coach. Popp coached full-time for one season in 2007. During the 2001 season, Popp took over the team after owner Robert C. Wetenhall fired Rod Rust in the midst of a long losing streak. On October 4, 2006, following the resignation of Don Matthews for health reasons, Popp again took over as head coach and led the Alouettes to an appearance in the 2006 Grey Cup. Popp continued coaching the Alouettes during the 2007 season as well, until Trestman was hired for 2008. On August 1, 2013, Popp returned as interim coach after new head coach Dan Hawkins was fired. Tom Higgins was named Alouettes' head coach for 2014, although he too was fired during the 2015 season, and Popp returned to coaching for the fourth time. Popp continued as the head coach for part of the 2016 CFL season before stepping back as strictly the General Manager.

== Coaching record ==
=== General manager ===
Team	Year	Regular season					Postseason	
Team	Year	Won	Lost	Ties	Finish	Won	Lost	Result
BAL	1994	12	6	0	2nd in East Division	2	1	Lost in 82nd Grey Cup
BAL	1995	15	3	0	1st in South Division	3	0	Won 83rd Grey Cup
MTL	1996	12	6	0	2nd in East Division	1	1	Lost in East Final
MTL	1997	13	5	0	2nd in East Division	1	1	Lost in East Final
MTL	1998	12	5	1	2nd in East Division	1	1	Lost in East Final
MTL	1999	12	6	0	1st in East Division	1	1	Lost in East Final
MTL	2000	12	6	0	1st in East Division	2	1	Lost in 88th Grey Cup
MTL	2001	9	9	0	3rd in East Division	0	1	Lost in East Semi-Final
MTL	2002	13	5	0	1st in East Division	2	0	Won 90th Grey Cup
MTL	2003	13	5	0	1st in East Division	2	1	Lost in 91st Grey Cup
MTL	2004	14	4	0	1st in East Division	1	1	Lost in East Final
MTL	2005	10	8	0	2nd in East Division	2	1	Lost in 93rd Grey Cup
MTL	2006	10	8	0	1st in East Division	1	1	Lost in 94th Grey Cup
MTL	2007	8	10	0	3rd in East Division	0	1	Lost in East Semi-Final
MTL	2008	11	7	0	1st in East Division	1	1	Lost in 96th Grey Cup
MTL	2009	15	3	0	1st in East Division	2	0	Won 97th Grey Cup
MTL	2010	12	6	0	1st in East Division	2	0	Won 98th Grey Cup
MTL	2011	10	8	0	2nd in East Division	0	1	Lost in East Semi-Final
MTL	2012	11	7	0	1st in East Division	0	1	Lost in East Final
MTL	2013	8	10	0	3rd in East Division	0	1	Lost in East Semi-Final
MTL	2014	9	9	0	2nd in East Division	1	1	Lost in East Final
MTL	2015	6	12	0	4th in East Division	-	-	Missed playoffs
MTL	2016	7	11	0	3rd in East Division	-	-	Missed playoffs
TOR	2017	9	9	0	1st in East Division	2	0	Won 105th Grey Cup
TOR	2018	4	14	0	4th in East Division	-	-	Missed playoffs
TOR	2019	2	12	0	Fired	-	-	
Total		269	194	1	11 Division Championships	27	17	5 Grey Cup Championships

=== Head coach ===
Team	Year	Regular season					Postseason		
Team	Year	Won	Lost	Ties	Win %	Finish	Won	Lost	Result
MTL	2001	0	1	0	.000	3rd in East Division	0	1	Lost in Division Semi-Finals
MTL	2006	2	2	0	.500	1st in East Division	1	1	Lost in Grey Cup
MTL	2007	8	10	0	.444	3rd in East Division	0	1	Lost in Division Semi-Finals
MTL	2013	6	7	0	.461	3rd in East Division	0	1	Lost in Division Semi-Finals
MTL	2015	3	7	0	.300	4th in East Division	-	-	Did not qualify
MTL	2016	3	9	0	.250	-	-	-	-
Total		22	36	0	.379	1 East Division Championship	1	4	0 Grey Cup Championships

== Personal ==
Popp's son, Preston Popp, is a professional soccer player.
