= Jonathan Beaulieu-Richard =

Canadian football player (1994–2022)

Profile
- Position: Linebacker

Personal information
- Born: October 10, 1988; Trois-Rivières, Quebec, Canada
- Died: September 25, 2022 (aged 33); Trois-Rivières, Quebec, Canada
- Listed height: 6 ft 1 in (1.85 m)
- Listed weight: 215 lb (98 kg)

Career information
- University: Montréal
- CFL draft: 2012: undrafted

Career history
- 2013: Hamilton Tiger-Cats
- 2013–2015: Montreal Alouettes
- 2015–2016: Ottawa Redblacks
- Stats at CFL.ca

Jonathan Beaulieu-Richard (October 10, 1988 – September 25, 2022) was a Canadian professional football player who was a linebacker for the Hamilton Tiger-Cats, Montreal Alouettes, and Ottawa Redblacks of the Canadian Football League (CFL) from 2013 to 2016.

== University football ==
Beaulieu-Richard attended the University of Montreal, where he studied pharmacy and played CIS football with the Montreal Carabins from 2008 to 2012. He recorded 180.5 tackles, including 43.5 in his senior year, setting the team record for most tackles in a game and most tackles in a season. He is second in Carabins' history in career tackles. As a senior, he was named an RSEQ all-star.

== Professional career ==
=== Hamilton Tiger-Cats ===
After going undrafted in the 2012 CFL draft and returning to school for his final season of eligibility, Beaulieu-Richard signed with the Hamilton Tiger-Cats. He made the team's opening day roster and played in his first professional game on June 28, 2013, against the Toronto Argonauts. He was then moved to the team's practice roster and then was released on July 29, 2013.

=== Montreal Alouettes ===
Soon after his Hamilton release, Beaulieu-Richard was signed to a practice roster agreement by the Montreal Alouettes on August 4, 2013. He played one game with the Alouettes on August 17, 2013, where he had one special teams tackle, and spent the remainder of the season on the practice roster.

In 2014, Beaulieu-Richard began the year on the injured list, but still played in ten regular season games where he had nine special teams tackles. He was released from his contract on September 2, and signed a new two-year contract in December 2014.

=== Ottawa Redblacks ===
On September 28, 2015, Beaulieu-Richard signed with the Ottawa Redblacks. He played in five regular season games in 2015 where he had two special teams tackles. He also made his playoff debut and dressed in both post-season games, including the team's loss in the 103rd Grey Cup to the Edmonton Eskimos.

In 2016, Beaulieu-Richard played in nine of the team's first ten games where he had one defensive tackle and four special teams tackles before being released on September 14, 2016.

Beaulieu-Richard retired with 16 career tackles on special teams and one on defense in 26 games.

== Personal life and death ==
Beaulieu-Richard and his wife, Émilie, had two children, Alie and Laurent.

Following his playing career, Beaulieu-Richard pursued a career in pharmacy. He ran as an independent candidate in the riding of Maskinongé in the 2018 Quebec general election. In September 2021, he announced that he had stage 4 angiosarcoma and was scheduled for open heart surgery. He died from the cancer on September 25, 2022, at age 33.
