= Steven Lumbala =

Canadian football player (born 1991)

Steven Y. Lumbala
No. 22
- Position: Running back

Personal information
- Born: August 9, 1991 (age 35); Montreal, Quebec, Canada
- Listed height: 5 ft 11 in (1.80 m)
- Listed weight: 220 lb (100 kg)

Career information
- High school: Saint Francis
- University: Calgary
- CFL draft: 2013: 1st round, 5th overall pick

Career history
- 2013–2014: Montreal Alouettes
- Stats at CFL.ca (archive)

Steven Yamukeka Jr. Lumbala (born September 9, 1991) is a Canadian former professional football running back who played for the Montreal Alouettes of the Canadian Football League (CFL). After the 2012 CIS season, he was ranked as the 13th best player in the CFL's Amateur Scouting Bureau December rankings for players eligible in the 2013 CFL draft and sixth by players in Canadian Interuniversity Sport. Lumbala was drafted in the first round, fifth overall by the Alouettes and signed with the team on May 27, 2013. He played CIS football for the Calgary Dinos. He retired in April 2015 to take a job in the oil and gas industry. In 2020, Lumbala obtained his Juris Doctor from Université de Moncton Faculty of Law.
