= Geoff Tisdale =

American gridiron football player (born 1986)

Profile
- Position: Defensive back

Personal information
- Born: February 21, 1986 (age 40); Pacoima, California, U.S.
- Listed height: 6 ft 1 in (1.85 m)
- Listed weight: 185 lb (84 kg)

Career information
- College: Pittsburg State
- NFL draft: 2008: undrafted

Career history
- 2008–2010: Hamilton Tiger-Cats
- 2011: Calgary Stampeders
- 2012: Hamilton Tiger-Cats
- 2013–2015: Montreal Alouettes
- 2015: Saskatchewan Roughriders
- 2016: Hamilton Tiger-Cats

Awards and highlights
- CFL All-Star (2013); CFL East All-Star (2013, 2014)
- Stats at CFL.ca

Geoff Tisdale (born February 21, 1986) is a professional Canadian football defensive back. He last played for the Saskatchewan Roughriders of the Canadian Football League (CFL) until being released on August 15, 2015. He was signed by the Hamilton Tiger-Cats as a street free agent in 2008. He played college football for the Pittsburg State Gorillas. On February 16, 2011, Tisdale was signed by the Calgary Stampeders as a free agent. On June 24, 2012, Tisdale was traded to the Hamilton Tiger-Cats for Hamilton's third-round and sixth-round draft picks in 2014.
