= Tanner Marsh =

American gridiron football player (born 1990)

No. 4, 12
- Position: Quarterback

Personal information
- Born: May 29, 1990 (age 36); Carrollton, Texas, U.S.
- Listed height: 6 ft 4 in (1.93 m)
- Listed weight: 218 lb (99 kg)

Career information
- High school: Hebron (Carrollton, Texas)
- College: Arkansas Tech

Career history

Playing
- 2013–2015: Montreal Alouettes
- 2017: Cleveland Gladiators
- 2018: Texas Revolution
- 2020: Frisco Fighters

Coaching
- 2016: Dorval-Jean-XXIII (QB)

Career CFL statistics
- Comp. / Att.: 101 / 185
- Passing yards: 1,351
- TD–INT: 5–15
- QB rating: 53.2
- Rushing yards: 348
- Rushing TDs: 12
- Stats at CFL.ca (archive)
- Stats at ArenaFan.com

Tanner Marsh (born May 29, 1990) is an American former professional football quarterback who played in the Canadian Football League (CFL) and Arena Football League (AFL).

== College career ==
He played college football for the Arkansas Tech Wonder Boys for one season after transferring from West Texas A&M, and he was named honorable mention All-Great American Conference.

== Professional career ==
=== Montreal Alouettes ===
Marsh was signed by the Montreal Alouettes on June 1, 2013 and made the team's active roster as the third-string quarterback. He recorded his first professional touchdown pass on August 22, against the BC Lions with a three-yard toss to S. J. Green. Marsh scored his first touchdown in that same game with a 6-yard rushing touchdown, and helped lead Montreal to a thrilling 39–38 comeback win for his first career CFL win. He won his first game as a starter September 3, against the Toronto Argonauts 20–9.

Marsh was released by the Alouettes on April 14, 2016.

=== Cleveland Gladiators ===
On March 9, 2017, Marsh was assigned to the Cleveland Gladiators. Marsh made his first career AFL start on April 16. After throwing for 228 yards and four touchdowns, Marsh was removed from the game. On April 19, Marsh was placed on injured reserve. On June 21, Marsh was placed on reassignment. The next day, Marsh was assigned to the Gladiators once again.

=== Texas Revolution ===
On March 22, 2018, Marsh signed with the Texas Revolution of Champions Indoor Football. He was released by Texas on April 12.

=== Frisco Fighters ===
In March 2020, Marsh signed a contract with the Frisco Fighters, an Indoor Football League team.
