= Bryn Roy =

Canadian football player (born 1988)

No. 76
- Position: Linebacker

Personal information
- Born: April 14, 1988 (age 38); Dalemead, Alberta, Canada
- Listed height: 6 ft 1 in (1.85 m)
- Listed weight: 225 lb (102 kg)

Career information
- College: Snow, Texas A&M–Commerce
- CFL draft: 2012: 5th round, 34th overall pick

Career history
- 2012–2015: Montreal Alouettes
- 2016: Saskatchewan Roughriders
- 2017: Edmonton Eskimos*
- * Offseason or practice squad member only
- Stats at CFL.ca

Bryn Roy (born April 14, 1988) is a Canadian former professional football linebacker who played in the Canadian Football League (CFL). He was drafted 34th overall by the Montreal Alouettes in the 2012 CFL draft and was signed on May 24, 2012. He played college football with the Texas A&M–Commerce Lions.

After his playing career he pursued a career in motion pictures working as an actor and stunt man. He was in the Paramount original series “Joe Pickett”, Kevin Costner’s “Let him go”, Netflix’s “Wynona Earp” and “Damnation”.

Bryn now competes as a Steer Wrestler in the PRCA (Professional Rodeo Cowboys Association) and the CPRA (Canadian Professional Rodeo Association). Following his father’s footsteps, Bryn is one of the top Canadian Steer Wrestlers in the world.

Bryn’s father Mark Roy was the first Canadian to win a PRCA Steer Wrestling World Championship in 1992. And is enshrined in the Canadian Pro Rodeo Hall of Fame.

== Early life ==
Roy was born and raised in Dalemead, Alberta, the son of Mark and Audi Roy. His father was a World Champion Steer Wrestler. Bryn competed in the Team Roping as a teenager and young adult. However, he quickly transitioned into a football player where he was a three-year letterwinner at safety and wide receiver at Foothills Composite High School. He was named team MVP and regional MVP as a senior and was a three-time all-region selection and All-Province selection at safety. He was also voted the receiver of the year by opposing coaches in the league his senior season, recording 52 receptions and 8 touchdowns. Roy helped lead Foothills to the Provincial Championship as a junior and a League Championship in his junior and senior year. As senior he was a defensive captain and Most Valuable DB at the Alberta Senior Bowl.

== College career ==
Roy moved to the United States and attended Snow College in Utah. He spent two seasons at Snow where he was Second team All-Conference selection as a sophomore after tallying 75 tackles, four sacks and a pair of fumble recoveries and notched a pair of sacks a forced fumble and two fumble recoveries in his first collegiate start. He helped lead the Badgers to back-to-back WSFL Conference championships.

Roy transferred to Texas A&M-Commerce for his final two seasons where he was a starter as a Junior and was a key part of the Lions defense in 2011, capping off his collegiate career with a sack in each of his final four games. He was a Business Marketing major while in Commerce. He decided to forgo his senior season and was drafted by Montreal, selected with the 34th pick overall.

== Professional career ==
=== Montreal Alouettes ===
Roy was drafted by the Montreal Alouettes of the Canadian Football League in the 5th round (34th overall). Despite struggling with injuries in his first couple seasons in the league, Roy signed a two-year contract extension on January 6, 2015. He played in just 14 games over his four-year tenure with the Alouettes, still managing to notch up 14 Special Teams Tackles, leading the entire league for the month of October 2014 with 9. However, after spending more time on the injured list in 2015 due to an off season training injury, he was released on August 10, 2015.

=== Saskatchewan Roughriders ===
Bryn signed with the Saskatchewan Roughriders on August 22, 2016. During the 2016 season Roy dressed for 9 games. He was released by the Roughriders on December 1, 2016.

=== Edmonton Eskimos ===
Roy was signed to the practice roster of the Edmonton Eskimos on October 12, 2017.
