= Simon Légaré =

Canadian football player (born 1989)

Simon Legare
No. 57
- Position: Offensive lineman

Personal information
- Born: September 26, 1989 (age 37); Montreal, Quebec, Canada
- Listed height: 6 ft 4 in (1.93 m)
- Listed weight: 315 lb (143 kg)

Career information
- University: Montreal Carabins
- CFL draft: 2013: 6th round, 3rd overall pick

Career history
- 2015: Ottawa Redblacks

Awards and highlights
- 2010 Quebec All-Star team (CIS)
- Stats at CFL.ca

Simon Legare (born September 26, 1989) is a Canadian former professional football offensive lineman. Born in Montreal, Quebec, Legare played CIS football with the Montreal Carabins. He's now a firefighter for Service de sécurité incendie de Montréal. Also, he's the Offensive Line coach for the Dragons du Collège Saint-Jean-Vianney Football Team, since the 2023-2024 season of the Dragons.

== Professional career ==
In the 2013 CFL draft Legare was drafted by the Montreal Alouettes of the Canadian Football League. He was selected in the 6th round with the 3 pick (47th overall). He signed with the Al's on May 13, 2013. He became a free agent player and signed with Ottawa Redblacks for 2 years.
