= Michael Klassen =

Canadian football player (born 1991)

No. 94
- Position: Defensive lineman

Personal information
- Born: March 20, 1991 (age 35); Calgary, Alberta, Canada
- Listed height: 6 ft 5 in (1.96 m)
- Listed weight: 285 lb (129 kg)

Career information
- University: Calgary
- CFL draft: 2013: 4th round, 32nd overall pick

Career history
- 2013–2016: Montreal Alouettes
- 2017: Calgary Stampeders
- 2018–2019: Ottawa Redblacks
- Stats at CFL.ca

Michael Joseph Klassen (born March 20, 1991) is a Canadian former professional football defensive lineman. He was drafted in the fourth round, 32nd overall by the Montreal Alouettes in the 2013 CFL draft and signed with the team on May 27, 2013. He played CIS football for the Calgary Dinos.

== Professional career ==
=== Montreal Alouettes ===
A fourth round pick in the 2013 CFL draft, Klassen played four seasons for the Montreal Alouettes, appearing in 54 games, accumulating 48 defensive tackles, eight quarterback sacks and five special teams tackles. After signing a new deal following the 2016 season he was released by the Alouettes on May 27, 2017, before the start of training camp.

=== Calgary Stampeders ===
Michael Klassen signed with his hometown Calgary Stampeders four days after being released by Montreal. He spent one season with the Stampeders, playing in eight games.

=== Ottawa Redblacks ===
Klassen signed with the Ottawa Redblacks as a free agent on February 20, 2018, to a one-year contract. After setting new career highs with 28 defensive tackles and four sacks he and the Redblacks agreed to a two-year contract extension on February 8, 2019. He was placed on the retired list on December 18, 2019.
