= Bo Bowling =

American gridiron football player (born 1987)

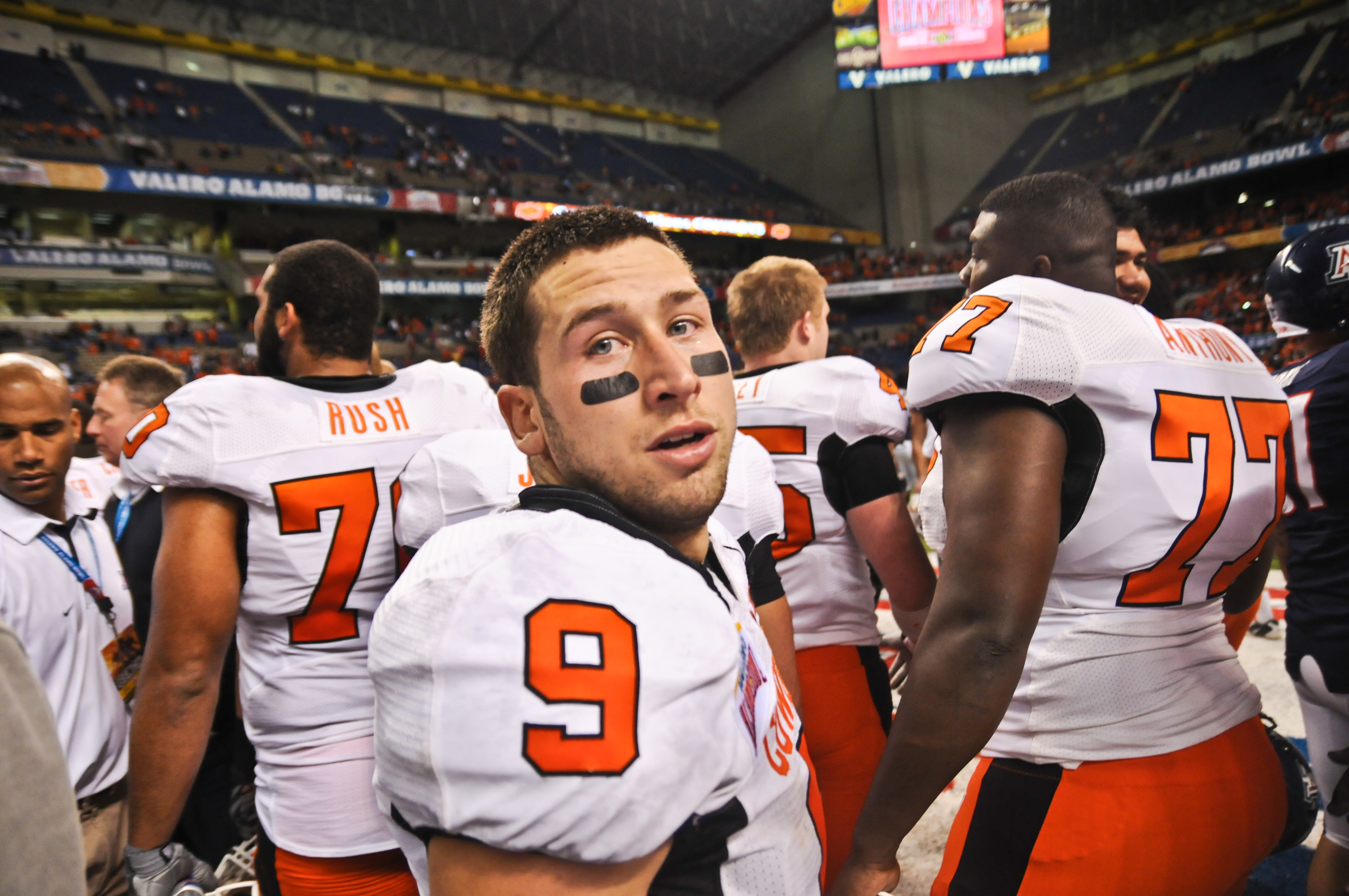
- Bowling with Oklahoma State in 2010

No. 0
- Positions: Slotback, Kick returner, Wide receiver

Personal information
- Born: November 1, 1987 (age 39); Tonkawa, Oklahoma, U.S.
- Listed height: 5 ft 9 in (1.75 m)
- Listed weight: 183 lb (83 kg)

Career information
- High school: Tonkawa (OK)
- College: Oklahoma State

Career history
- 2011–2014: Montreal Alouettes
- Stats at CFL.ca (archive)

Bo Bowling (born November 1, 1987) is an American former professional football wide receiver, kick returner and slotback who played in the Canadian Football League (CFL) for four seasons with the Montreal Alouettes. He played college football at Oklahoma State, with whom he won the Alamo Bowl in December 2010.

== Early life and college ==
Bo Bowling was born on November 1, 1987, in Ponca City, Oklahoma. He attended Tonkawa High School in Tonkawa, Oklahoma.

Bowling played college football at Northeastern Oklahoma A&M College from 2006 to 2007. He was then a three-year letterman for the Oklahoma State Cowboys of Oklahoma State University from 2008 to 2010.

== Professional career ==
Bowling was signed by the Montreal Alouettes of the CFL on May 6, 2011. He dressed in one game for the Alouettes in 2011, recording one reception for 21 yards, three punt returns for 28 yards, one kick return for 14 yards, and one defensive tackle. He dressed in 12 games, starting six, during the 2012 season, totaling ten catches for 127 yards and two touchdowns, 31 punt returns for 172 yards, four kick returns for 37 yards, and one defensive tackle.

Bowling announced his retirement on June 1, 2013 after tearing two ligaments in his ankle. He retired instead of having to be released or placed on the injured list. He came out of retirement and signed with the Alouettes on October 18, 2013. He played in three games, all starts, in 2013, accumulating six receptions for 43 yards and one touchdown, 12 punt returns for 173 yards, and three kick returns for 69 yards. Bowling dressed in two games for the Alouettes in 2014, recording one reception for six yards, six punt returns for 61 yards, and six kick returns for 62 yards. He became a free agent after the 2014 season.
