= Daryl Townsend =

Canadian gridiron football player (born 1985)

Profile
- Position: Defensive back

Personal information
- Born: September 25, 1985 (age 41); Windsor, Ontario, Canada
- Listed height: 6 ft 1 in (1.85 m)
- Listed weight: 198 lb (90 kg)

Career information
- University: Windsor
- CFL draft: 2011: undrafted

Career history
- 2011: Saskatchewan Roughriders*
- 2011: Winnipeg Blue Bombers
- 2011–2017: Montreal Alouettes
- 2018: Ottawa Redblacks*
- * Offseason or practice squad member only
- Stats at CFL.ca

Daryl Townsend (born September 25, 1985) is a Canadian former professional football defensive back who played in eight seasons in the Canadian Football League (CFL).

== CEGEP ==
Townsend played Cegep Div 1 (formerly 3A league) football for the Cougars at Champlain College in Lennoxville, Quebec, Canada.

== University career ==
Townsend played CIS Football with the Windsor Lancers.

== Professional career ==
=== Saskatchewan Roughriders ===
Townsend was originally signed as undrafted free agent by the Saskatchewan Roughriders following the 2011 CFL draft. He spent one week on their practice roster before being released.

=== Winnipeg Blue Bombers ===
Townsend signed a practice roster agreement with the Winnipeg Blue Bombers, playing in one game for the club.

=== Montreal Alouettes ===
Townsend was signed by the Montreal Alouettes on October 6, 2011. He played for seven seasons for the Alouettes before he was released on May 10, 2018.

=== Ottawa Redblacks ===
Townsend was signed by the Ottawa Redblacks on October 9, 2018. However, he was later released without playing a game for the Redblacks on October 23, 2018.
