= Mitchell White (gridiron football) =

American gridiron football player (born 1990)

No. 12
- Position: Cornerback

Personal information
- Born: March 30, 1990 (age 36); Livonia, Michigan, U.S.
- Listed height: 5 ft 11 in (1.80 m)
- Listed weight: 185 lb (84 kg)

Career information
- High school: Stevenson (Livonia)
- College: Michigan State
- NFL draft: 2013: undrafted

Career history
- Oakland Raiders (2013)*; Montreal Alouettes (2014–2015); Ottawa Redblacks (2016); Philadelphia Eagles (2017)*; Toronto Argonauts (2017); Montreal Alouettes (2018)
- * Offseason or practice squad member only

Awards and highlights
- 2× Grey Cup champion (2016, 2017); CFL East All-Star (2016)
- Stats at Pro Football Reference
- Stats at CFL.ca

Mitchell White (born March 30, 1990) is an American former professional football cornerback. He played college football at Michigan State.

== Professional career ==
=== Oakland Raiders ===
On May 13, 2013, White signed with the Oakland Raiders as an undrafted free agent. He was waived by Oakland on August 27.

=== Montreal Alouettes (first stint) ===
White signed with the Montreal Alouettes of the Canadian Football League on October 17, 2013 and spent the remainder of the year on the practice roster. He then played in 12 games in 2014 and 16 games in 2015 recording 59 defensive tackles and one interception as an Alouette. He was released during the team's training camp on June 19, 2016.

=== Ottawa Redblacks ===
Shortly after his release, he signed with the Ottawa Redblacks on July 17, 2016, where he was named a CFL East All-Star for the 2016 season, and started in the team's Grey Cup championship victory. He was released after the season to pursue NFL opportunities.

=== Philadelphia Eagles ===
On January 9, 2017, White signed with the Philadelphia Eagles. He was waived by the Eagles on August 13, only to be re-signed two days later. White was waived by Philadelphia again on August 30.

=== Toronto Argonauts ===
On September 10, 2017, White was signed by the Toronto Argonauts. Despite only playing in six games during the regular season, White recorded three interceptions, and won his second Grey Cup alongside fellow 2016 champion Cleyon Laing.

=== Montreal Alouettes (second stint) ===
As a top free agent, White rejoined Montreal in 2018, signing a two-year contract worth $140,000 Canadian in 2018, with a potential increase for 2019. White produced 13 tackles in six games played, but suffered a possible career-ending injury against the Edmonton Eskimos early in the season. He was released on May 1.
