= Aaron Lavarias =

American gridiron football player (born 1988)

No. 97
- Position: Defensive end

Personal information
- Born: April 27, 1988 (age 38); Woodinville, Washington, U.S.
- Listed height: 6 ft 3 in (1.91 m)
- Listed weight: 250 lb (113 kg)

Career information
- College: Idaho
- NFL draft: 2011: undrafted

Career history
- New England Patriots (2011)*; Detroit Lions (2011)*; New England Patriots (2011–2012)*; Montreal Alouettes (2012–2016)
- * Offseason or practice squad member only
- Stats at Pro Football Reference
- Stats at CFL.ca (archive)

Aaron Lavarias (born April 27, 1988) is an American former professional football defensive end for the Montreal Alouettes of the Canadian Football League (CFL). He had previously played for the New England Patriots.

== College career ==
He played college football at University of Idaho.

== Professional career ==
=== New England Patriots ===
On July 27, 2011, he signed as an undrafted free agent. On September 3, 2011, he was released. On September 5, 2011, he was signed to the Patriots practice squad. On September 14, 2011, he was released. On December 28, 2011, he was signed to the practice squad. On February 7, 2012, he signed a future contract with the team. Lavarias was released by the Patriots on August 31, 2012 during final cuts.

=== Montreal Alouettes ===
On October 3, 2012 Lavarias signed with the Montreal Alouettes of the CFL. In his first two seasons, he has recorded 78 tackles with 11 sacks and 1 fumble recovery. On January 2, 2015 Lavarias re-signed a 2-year contract with the Montreal Alouettes.
