= Nicolas Boulay =

Canadian football player (born 1989)

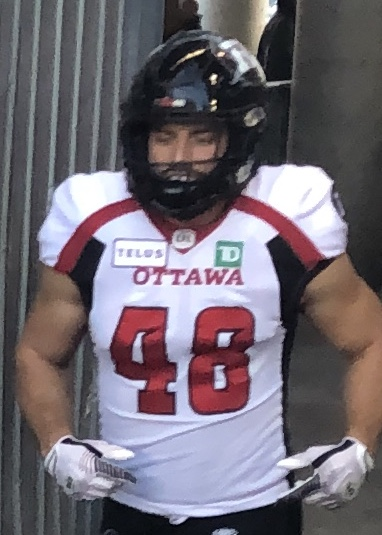
- Boulay with the Ottawa Redblacks in 2019

No. 48
- Position: Linebacker

Personal information
- Born: August 18, 1989 (age 37); Magog, Quebec, Canada
- Listed height: 6 ft 0 in (1.83 m)
- Listed weight: 220 lb (100 kg)

Career information
- University: Sherbrooke Vert et Or
- CFL draft: 2013: 4th round, 30th overall pick

Career history
- 2013–2018: Montreal Alouettes
- 2019: Ottawa Redblacks
- Stats at CFL.ca

Nicolas Boulay (born August 18, 1989) is a Canadian former professional football linebacker who played in the Canadian Football League (CFL) for the Montreal Alouettes and Ottawa Redblacks. He was selected 30th overall in the 2013 CFL draft by the Alouettes and signed with the team on May 13, 2013. He played CIS football with the Sherbrooke Vert et Or.

== University career ==
Boulay played four years with the University of Sherbrooke Vert et Or. He was named the team's defensive player of the year following a remarkable season in which his 58.5 tackles ranked fourth in the Quebec conference and sixth in the country. Boulay recorded two quarterback sacks in his nine games played in 2012 and was voted defensive captain that year.

== Professional career ==
In the 2013 CFL draft, Boulay was drafted by the Montreal Alouettes of the Canadian Football League. He was selected in the 4th round with the 3rd pick (30th overall). He signed with the Als on May 13, 2013.

He signed with the Ottawa Redblacks in February 2019. He played in ten games for the team in 2019 and was released by the Redblacks on January 23, 2020.

== Personal life ==
Nicolas's brother Mathieu Boulay was also a professional football player in the Canadian Football League.
