= Jerod Zaleski =

Canadian football player (born 1989)

No. 82, 41
- Position: Tight end/Long snapper

Personal information
- Born: December 20, 1989 (age 36); Kelowna, British Columbia, Canada
- Listed height: 6 ft 4 in (1.93 m)
- Listed weight: 241 lb (109 kg)

Career information
- High school: Kelowna (British Columbia)
- CJFL: Langley Rams
- College: Simon Fraser
- University: Calgary

Career history
- 2012–2015: Montreal Alouettes
- 2015: Toronto Argonauts
- Stats at CFL.ca (archive)

Jerod Zaleski (born December 20, 1989) is a Canadian former professional football tight end and long snapper who played in the Canadian Football League (CFL) for the Montreal Alouettes and Toronto Argonauts. He first enrolled at Simon Fraser University from 2007 to 2010 before playing at the University of Calgary in 2012.

== Early life and college ==
Jerod Zaleski was born on December 20, 1989, in Kelowna, British Columbia. He attended Kelowna Secondary School in Kelowna. He played for the Langley Rams of the Canadian Junior Football League (CJFL) in 2011.

Zaleski played for the Simon Fraser Clan of Simon Fraser University from 2008 to 2010. He played in all eight games his freshman year in 2008. He also played in every game in 2009, rushing once for four yards while recording 146 receiving yards and two touchdowns on sixteen receptions. Zaleski played in every game for the team as a tight end and long snapper in 2010, recording one reception for six yards.

Zaleski decided to play CIS football for the Calgary Dinos of the University of Calgary in 2012 after being released by the Montreal Alouettes before the start of the 2012 CFL season. He dressed in all eight regular season and two playoff games for the Dinos as a reserve receiver and long snapper. He also recorded 87 receiving yards and a touchdown on nine receptions.

== Professional career ==
On May 16, 2012, Zaleski signed with the Montreal Alouettes of the Canadian Football League. After playing in 2 preseason games, he was released by the Alouettes on June 21, and returned to the Calgary Dinos for the 2012 CIS season. He signed with the Alouettes on February 6, 2013. After being released by the team on June 10, Zaleski re-signed with the Alouettes on August 20. He played in eleven games during the 2013 season, recording three special teams tackles. He appeared in sixteen games in 2014 and recorded his first career reception for five yards. Zaleski was released by the Alouettes on August 15, 2015.

On August 25, 2015, Zaleski was signed to the Toronto Argonauts's practice roster. He was promoted to the active roster on August 27 and re-added to the practice roster on September 3, 2015. He then moved back and forth between the practice roster and active roster several more times during the 2015 season. He played in four games for the Argonauts and caught one pass for six yards. He was released by the Argonauts on November 16, 2015.
