= Jamahl Knowles =

Canadian football player (born 1988)

No. 25
- Position: Defensive back

Personal information
- Born: July 13, 1988 (age 38); Vancouver, British Columbia, Canada
- Listed height: 5 ft 10 in (1.78 m)
- Listed weight: 185 lb (84 kg)

Career information
- College: Calgary
- CFL draft: 2013: undrafted

Career history
- 2013–2015: Montreal Alouettes
- Stats at CFL.ca (archive)

Jamahl Jerette Knowles (born July 13, 1988) is a Canadian former professional football defensive back. He was signed as undrafted free agent by the Montreal Alouettes on July 1, 2013. He played CIS Football with the Calgary Dinos.
