= Robert C. Wetenhall =

American sports businessman (1935–2021)

Bob Wetenhall
- Born: Robert Carl Wetenhall; February 14, 1935; Rye, New York, U.S.
- Died: September 3, 2021 (aged 86); Palm Beach, Florida, U.S.
- Occupations: Investment Banking, Founder of New York firm McConnell Wetenhall Inc.
- Known for: Owner of the Montreal Alouettes Football Club
- Football career

Profile
- Position: Owner

Career information
- College: Princeton University

Career history
- 1997–2018: Montreal Alouettes
- Canadian Football Hall of Fame (Class of 2015)

Robert Carl "Bob" Wetenhall Sr. (February 14, 1935 – September 3, 2021) was an American businessman who owned the Montreal Alouettes Football Club of the Canadian Football League from 1997 through 2018.

== Biography ==
Robert (Bob) Wetenhall was born on February 14, 1935, in Rye, New York. He graduated from Princeton University and became an investment banker, becoming a founding partner of McConnell Wetenhall Inc. When the American Football League and National Football League merged in the 1960s Wetenhall became a part owner of the Boston Patriots of the AFL and the New England Patriots of the NFL. In the 1970s Wetenhall became involved in a North American soccer team. In 1997 Wetenhall purchased the Montreal Alouettes Canadian Football League club. During his ownership the Alouettes played in eight Grey Cups during the 14 seasons between 1997 and 2010. In addition they won three championships in the 2002, 2009 and 2010 seasons. On May 31, 2019, Wetenhall, facing old age and worsening conditions both on-field (the team missed the playoffs four consecutive seasons) and off-field with worsening attendance and exponentially growing financial losses, surrendered ownership of the Alouettes to the league in hopes of finding a new owner.

He was granted an honorary Doctor of Laws degree by McGill University on November 23, 2011, in recognition of his work in the redevelopment of the Montreal Alouettes and the expansion of Percival Molson Memorial Stadium.

In 2015, he was inducted into the Canadian Football Hall of Fame. He died on September 3, 2021, at his home in Palm Beach, Florida, at the age of 86.
