= Bear Woods =

American gridiron football player (born 1987)

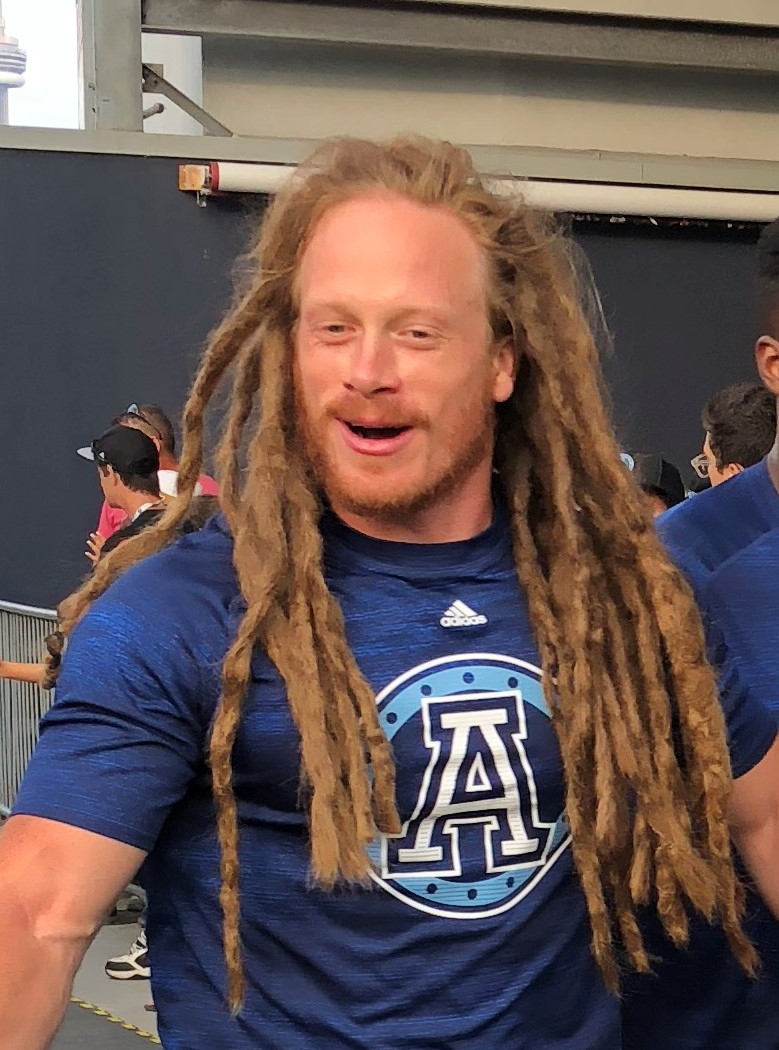
- Woods with the Toronto Argonauts in 2018

Profile
- Position: Linebacker

Personal information
- Born: January 22, 1987 (age 39); Macclenny, Florida, U.S.
- Listed height: 6 ft 0 in (1.83 m)
- Listed weight: 245 lb (111 kg)

Career information
- College: Troy

Career history
- 2010–2011: Atlanta Falcons*
- 2011–2016: Montreal Alouettes
- 2017–2021: Toronto Argonauts
- * Offseason or practice squad member only

Awards and highlights
- Grey Cup champion (2017); James P. McCaffrey Trophy (2014, 2016); First-team All-Sun Belt (2009); Second-team All-Sun Belt (2008); 2× CFL All-Star (2014, 2016); 2× CFL East All-Star (2014, 2016)
- Stats at Pro Football Reference
- Stats at CFL.ca

Jonathan "Bear" Woods (born January 22, 1987) is an American former professional football linebacker who played in the Canadian Football League (CFL). He was originally signed by the Atlanta Falcons of the National Football League (NFL) as an undrafted free agent in 2010. He made his professional debut for the Montreal Alouettes (CFL) in 2013 and won a Grey Cup championship with the Toronto Argonauts in 2017. He played college football at Troy University. In January 2022, he was named head football coach at Wetumpka High School in Wetumpka, Alabama.

== Early life ==
Woods is a native of Macclenny, Florida and attended Baker County High School.

== Professional career ==
=== Atlanta Falcons ===
Woods was signed by the Atlanta Falcons as an undrafted free agent on April 26, 2010. He was waived on September 2, 2011.

=== Montreal Alouettes ===
On September 28, 2011, Woods signed with the Montreal Alouettes. Woods did not see any playing time in his first 2 seasons in the CFL; in the 2013 CFL season Woods played on special teams and sparingly on defense. He accumulated 5 defensive tackles and 13 special teams tackles.

The 2014 CFL season proved to be a breakout year for Woods, as he finished the year ranked number 2 in tackles with 89 (BC Lions linebacker Solomon Elimimian finished first with 143). He also added an impressive 7 quarterback sacks. He was the East Division nominee for the CFL's Most Outstanding Defensive Player Award in 2014, winning the James P. McCaffrey Trophy as consolation. Following his standout season, he signed a three-year extension with the Alouettes on January 2, 2015. Woods missed the vast majority of the 2015 season after suffering a torn pectoral muscle in the second game of the season. Woods returned to being one of the star players on the Al's defense for their 2016 season. He played in all 18 regular season games and for the second time in his career finished second in tackles to Elimimian. Woods also had five sacks, three forced fumbles, one of which he recovered, and two interceptions. Just like in 2014, both linebackers were nominated to represent their divisions as the finalists for the CFL's Most Outstanding Defensive Player Award. Just like in 2014 Solomon Elimimian once again took home the CFL's Most Outstanding Defensive Player Award for the 2016 season. On May 29, 2017, at the start of training camp for the 2017 season, the Alouettes announced they had released Woods.

=== Toronto Argonauts ===
On June 7, 2017, the Toronto Argonauts announced they had signed Woods to a contract. He played and started in 17 regular season games and both playoff games, leading the team in defensive tackles. He won his first Grey Cup championship in the Argonauts' 105th Grey Cup victory, posting four defensive tackles in the game. He started the 2018 Toronto Argonauts season on the six-game injured list while he recovered from shoulder surgery and would ultimately only play in four games that season, contributing 29 defensive tackles and 2 special teams tackles. On January 28, 2019, Woods and the Argos agreed to a one-year contract extension. However, he was released three days prior to the start of training camp on May 16, 2019. He was then re-signed by the Argonauts to a practice roster agreement on July 29, 2019. He signed a restructured contract on February 26, 2021. Woods ended up missing the season with injury, and in January 2022 marked a career transition by becoming a head coach for Wetumpka High School in Alabama.
