= 1999 BC Lions season =

Canadian football team season

- Owner: David Braley
- General manager: Adam Rita
- Head coach: Greg Mohns
- Home stadium: BC Place Stadium

Results
- Record: 13–5
- Division place: 1st, West
- Playoffs: Lost West Final

The 1999 BC Lions finished in first place in the West Division with a 13–5 record. They appeared in the West Final.

== Offseason ==
=== CFL draft ===
Round	Pick	Player	Position	School
1	1	Rob Meier	DE	Washington State
1	3	Greg Lotysz	OL	North Dakota
2	11	Mathieu Beaudoin	OL	Syracuse
2	14	David Pol	OL	British Columbia
2	15	Richard Mercier	OL	Miami
3	19	Jason Kralt	DB	Carleton
4	27	Craig Higgins	RB	Western
5	34	Jason Crumb	QB	Saskatchewan
6	42	Akbal Singh	RB	British Columbia

== Preseason ==
Week	Date	Opponent	Result	Record
A	Wed, June 23	at Calgary Stampeders	L 21–24	0–1
B	Wed, June 30	vs. Edmonton Eskimos	L 9–49	0–2

== Regular season ==
=== Season standings ===
West Division
Pos	Team	Pld	W	L	T	PF	PA	PD	Pts
1	BC Lions (C, Q)	18	13	5	0	429	373	+56	26
2	Calgary Stampeders (Q)	18	12	6	0	503	393	+110	24
3	Edmonton Eskimos (Q)	18	6	12	0	459	502	−43	12
4	Saskatchewan Roughriders	18	3	15	0	370	592	−222	6

Source: "1999 CFL regular season standings". Archived from the original on 2009-06-29.
(C) First round bye; (Q) Qualified for playoffs

=== Season schedule ===
Week	Game	Date	Opponent	Result	Record
1	1	Fri, July 9	at Edmonton Eskimos	W 25–13	1–0
2	2	Tue, July 15	vs. Calgary Stampeders	W 37–27	2–0
3	3	Fri, July 23	at Saskatchewan Roughriders	W 32–21	3–0
4	4	Thu, July 29	vs. Winnipeg Blue Bombers	L 18–30	3–1
5	5	Thu, Aug 5	at Calgary Stampeders	W 13–9	4–1
6	6	Thu, Aug 12	vs. Toronto Argonauts	L 26–28	4–2
7	7	Thu, Aug 19	at Hamilton Tiger-Cats	W 38–33	5–2
8	8	Thu, Aug 26	vs. Saskatchewan Roughriders	W 28–21	6–2
9	9	Wed, Sept 2	vs. Montreal Alouettes	W 44–23	7–2
10	10	Sun, Sept 12	at Winnipeg Blue Bombers	W 20–16	8–2
11	11	Sun, Sept 19	at Montreal Alouettes	L 12–21	8–3
12	12	Sat, Sept 25	vs. Calgary Stampeders	W 21–20	9–3
13	13	Sat, Oct 2	at Toronto Argonauts	W 28–19	10–3
14	14	Mon, Oct 11	vs. Edmonton Eskimos	L 20–26	10–4
15	15	Sun, Oct 17	at Edmonton Eskimos	W 21–13	11–4
16	16	Sun, Oct 24	at Calgary Stampeders	L 1–14	11–5
17	17	Sat, Oct 30	vs. Hamilton Tiger-Cats	W 26–21	12–5
18	18	Fri, Nov 5	vs. Saskatchewan Roughriders	W 19–18	13–5

== Roster ==
1999 BC Lions final roster
Quarterbacks: 9 Damon Allen; 13 Khari Jones; 19 Todd Marinovich; Running backs: 32 Simon Baffoe; 29 Robert Drummond; 28 Mark Nohra; Receivers: 20 Bret Anderson K; 20 Don Blair; 2 Eddie Brown; 21 Jimmy Cunningham; 81 Rod Harris; 7 Alfred Jackson	Offensive linemen: 55 Doug Davies C; 64 Mo Elewonibi T; 61 Steve Hardin T; 66 Mark Hatfield G; 68 Cory Mantyka G; 57 Dan Payne T; 60 Jamie Taras G; Defensive linemen: 92 Noah Cantor DT; 74 Dave Chaytors DT; 72 Johnny Scott DE; 91 Herman Smith DE; Special teams: 5 Lui Passaglia K/P	Linebackers: 50 Antonio Armstrong; 56 Daved Benefield; 49 Jason Kralt; 58 Paul Lacoste; 33 Kelly Lochbaum; Defensive backs: 27 Raphaol Ball; 6 Greg Bearman; 2 Eric Carter; 26 Reggie Carthon; 37 Mike Crumb; 10 Dave Donaldson; 12 Dale Joseph; 17 Bo Lewis; 22 Rafael Robinson	Injured list: 46 Mathieu Beaudoin T; 99 Keith Franklin LB; 88 Sean Graham SB; 63 Scott Hendrickson C; 83 Rocky Henry WR; 23 Juan Johnson RB; 85 Jimmy Oliver WR; 98 Marvin Thomas DE; Italics indicate International player

== Awards and records ==
- Paul Lacoste, Outstanding Rookie
- Jamie Taras, Tom Pate Memorial Award

== Playoffs ==
=== West Final ===
Team	Q1	Q2	Q3	Q4	Total
Calgary Stampeders	10	13	0	3	26
BC Lions	0	7	10	7	24
