= 2000 BC Lions season =

Canadian football team season

- General manager: Adam Rita
- Head coach: Greg Mohns; Steve Buratto (Interim)
- Home stadium: BC Place Stadium

Results
- Record: 8–10
- Division place: 3rd, West
- Playoffs: Won Grey Cup

The 2000 BC Lions finished in third place in the West Division with an 8–10 record. With the team sitting at 3–4, head coach Greg Mohns resigned allowing for receivers coach Steve Buratto to take over the team on an interim basis. The Lions won four of their last five regular season games and entered the post-season with heavy momentum. As such, they became the first team in CFL history with a losing record to win the Grey Cup. Long-time Lion Lui Passaglia retired following the championship, after a CFL record 25 seasons in the league.

== Offseason ==
=== CFL draft ===
Rd	Pick	Player	Position	School
1	6	Adriano Belli	DT	Houston
3	20	Brent Johnson	DE	Ohio State
4	28	Loren Padelford	OL	Guelph
6	44	Fabian Rayne	RB	Western

== Preseason ==
Week	Date	Opponent	Score	Result	Record
A	June 21	Edmonton Eskimos	26–21	Win	1–0
B	June 27	Calgary Stampeders	32–20	Loss	1–1

== Regular season ==
=== Season standings ===
West Division
Pos	Team	Pld	W	L	T	OTL	PF	PA	PD	Pts
1	Calgary Stampeders (C, Q)	18	12	5	1	0	604	495	+109	25
2	Edmonton Eskimos (Q)	18	10	7	0	1	527	520	+7	21
3	BC Lions (Q)	18	8	9	0	1	513	529	−16	17
4	Saskatchewan Roughriders	18	5	12	1	0	516	626	−110	11

Source: "CFL.ca". Archived from the original on 2009-06-29.
(C) First round bye; (Q) Qualified for playoffs

=== Season schedule ===
Week	Date	Opponent	Score	Result	Record	Streak
1	July 7	at Hamilton Tiger-Cats	33–26	Win	1–0	W1
2	July 13	vs. Saskatchewan Roughriders	30–28	Win	2–0	W2
3	July 20	at Calgary Stampeders	35–2	Loss	2–1	L1
4	July 26	vs. Edmonton Eskimos	29–13	Loss	2–2	L2
5	August 4	at Winnipeg Blue Bombers	31–16	Loss	2–3	L3
6	August 10	vs. Calgary Stampeders	47–26	Loss	2–4	L4
7	August 17	vs. Toronto Argonauts	36–26	Win	3–4	W1
8	August 24	at Toronto Argonauts	51–4	Win	4–4	W2
9	August 31	vs. Montreal Alouettes	35–25	Loss	4–5	L1
10	Sept 9	at Saskatchewan Roughriders	28–20	Loss	4–6	L2
11	Sept 15	vs. Edmonton Eskimos	26–14	Win	5–6	W1
12	Sept 24	at Montreal Alouettes	29–28	Loss	5–7	L1
13	Oct 1	at Edmonton Eskimos	49–42	Loss	5–8	L2
14	Oct 9	vs. Winnipeg Blue Bombers	40–33	Loss	5–9	L3
15	Oct 14	at Saskatchewan Roughriders	39–15	Win	6–9	W1
16	Oct 22	at Calgary Stampeders	45–38	Loss	6–10	L1
17	Oct 28	vs. Hamilton Tiger-Cats	28–20	Win	7–10	W1
18	Nov 4	vs. Saskatchewan Roughriders	27–26	Win	8–10	W2

== Awards and records ==
- CFL's Most Outstanding Canadian Award – Sean Millington (RB)

=== 2000 CFL All-Stars ===
- RB – Sean Millington, CFL All-Star
- OT – Chris Perez, CFL All-Star
- K – Lui Passaglia, CFL All-Star

=== Western Division All-Star Selections ===
- RB – Sean Millington, CFL Western All-Star
- SB – Alfred Jackson, CFL Western All-Star
- OT – Chris Perez, CFL Western All-Star
- K – Lui Passaglia, CFL Western All-Star
- DE – Herman Smith, CFL Western All-Star
- CB – Eric Carter, CFL Western All-Star

== Playoffs ==
=== West Semi-Final ===
Team	Q1	Q2	Q3	Q4	Total
Edmonton Eskimos	3	8	3	18	32
BC Lions	14	3	14	3	34

=== West Final ===
Team	Q1	Q2	Q3	Q4	Total
Calgary Stampeders	1	10	0	12	23
BC Lions	4	20	10	3	37

=== Grey Cup ===
Team	Q1	Q2	Q3	Q4	Total
BC Lions	8	4	0	16	28
Montreal Alouettes	3	0	7	16	26

== Roster ==
2000 BC Lions final roster
Quarterbacks: 9 Damon Allen; 13 Doug Nussmeier; 1 Nate Sparks; Running backs: 32 Simon Baffoe; 29 Robert Drummond; 23 Chuck Levy DB; 19 Mike Maurer; 25 Sean Millington; Receivers: 8 Bret Anderson K; 20 Don Blair; 10 Jason Crumb; 21 Jimmy Cunningham; 88 Sean Graham; 7 Alfred Jackson; 89 Denis Montana; 85 Jimmy Oliver	Offensive linemen: 66 Bob Beveridge G; 61 Steve Hardin T; 59 Craig Hendrickson G; 68 Cory Mantyka G; 57 Dan Payne T; 62 Chris Perez T; 60 Jamie Taras G/C; Defensive linemen: 92 Noah Cantor DT; 95 Cameron Legault DT; 91 Herman Smith DE; 98 Marvin Thomas DE; Linebackers: 56 Daved Benefield; 12 Damon Cogdell; 33 Kelly Lochbaum; 31 Roger Reinson	Defensive backs: 2 Eric Carter; 37 Mike Crumb; 6 Michael Fletcher; 26 Carl Kidd; 17 Bo Lewis; 34 Central McClellion; Special teams: 5 Lui Passaglia K/P; Injured list: 27 Raphaol Ball DB; 96 Eric England DE; 22 Michael Jordan DB; 49 Jason Kralt LB; Suspended: 6 Greg Bearman DB; 63 Scott Hendrickson C; Italics indicate International player
