= Bret Anderson =

Canadian football player (born 1974)

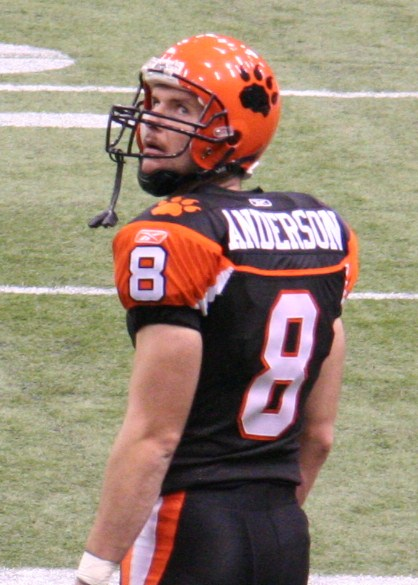
- Anderson with the BC Lions in 2007

No. 8
- Positions: Slotback, Kicker

Personal information
- Born: April 23, 1975 (age 51); New Westminster, Canada
- Listed height: 6 ft 3 in (1.91 m)
- Listed weight: 210 lb (95 kg)

Career information
- High school: Terry Fox HS
- University: Simon Fraser
- CFL draft: 1997: 4th round, 25th overall pick

Career history
- 1997–2009: BC Lions

Awards and highlights
- 2× Grey Cup champion (2000, 2006)

Bret Anderson (born April 23, 1975) is a Canadian former professional football placekicker and slotback who played his entire career for the BC Lions of the Canadian Football League (CFL).

Anderson is 6'3" and 215 lbs. He played 13 years in the CFL, mostly as a slotback and all with the Lions. He went to Simon Fraser University in Burnaby. During that time, he also worked with former Coquitlam Cheetahs track and field coach Percy Perry on developing his running.

Bret was drafted in the 4th round, 25th overall by the Lions in the 1997 CFL draft. Anderson was key to the BC Lions's 2000 Grey Cup win. From 2001 to 2003, he caught 66 passes and had 4 touchdowns as a backup. He played only 5 games in 2004 before retiring to become a firefighter. In 2005, he came back and recorded his longest kick ever on October 16, 2005 against the Montreal Alouettes. The kick was 91 yards long. Anderson got his second Grey Cup ring in 2006.

Bret Anderson works for the Port Coquitlam fire department both during and after the football season. The Coquitlam, British Columbia native has gone through the formality of resigning from the Lions each year since he got on full-time with the PCFD in 2004 (he left the team after five games that season and did not rejoin until 2005).

Anderson did not initially return for the 2009 BC Lions season but was re-signed on October 5, 2009.

== Early life ==
Anderson attended Terry Fox Secondary School in Port Coquitlam, British Columbia where he played both football and basketball. He played quarterback on the football team. As a senior in 1992, Anderson led the Terry Fox Ravens to the semi-finals of the provincial playoffs, where the Ravens lost to the Vancouver College Fighting Irish. He was designated the high school football offensive player-of-the-year in British Columbia. As a basketball player, Anderson was selected as the MVP of the British Columbia AAA high school basketball tournament after leading the Ravens to their first championship in school history. During the tournament, he scored 44 points against Caledonia and a game-high 28 points in the final against the North Delta Huskies. He played in a provincial basketball all-star game and was selected to represent British Columbia in the first football national championship tournament. Anderson was a finalist for 1993 British Columbia High School Athlete of the Year.

== College career ==
Anderson was recruited to play both football and basketball for colleges in the United States and Canada. By March 1993, over sixty colleges indicated interest. Anderson chose to remain in British Columbia and play both sports for the Simon Fraser Clan.

=== Football ===
In 1993, Anderson was third on the depth chart at quarterback and contributed mostly as a punter. He finished with 1,406 yards on punts, and his only scoring play was a 53-yard rushing touchdown on a trick play. As a sophomore, Anderson was initially used as a receiver after multiple players dropped out of the football team during training camp. After placekicker Tyson O'Shea suffered a knee injury, Anderson also began kicking field goals and regularly punting for the Clan. In his first game as a placekicker, he kicked four field goals and four one-point conversions to be named Mount Rainier Columbia Football Association player of the week. In 1995, Anderson was selected to the All-Conference first team as a kicker. As a senior, Anderson's kicking was considered the most reliable portion of the Clan's offense. He was named to the All-Conference second team.

=== Basketball ===
As a freshman, Anderson didn't participate heavily on the basketball team. Due to overlaps in the football and basketball seasons, he didn't join the team until November, and he played only 13 minutes over the first four games he played with the Clan. Anderson was eventually substituted into 13 games as a freshman and scored 21 points. He was more active on the team as a sophomore. Anderson scored 10 points in overtime to help the Clan defeat Lewis–Clark State College 85–69. The following week, he scored a team-high 18 points in a 90–87 playoff loss to Seattle University. Anderson continued playing basketball through his junior year before deciding to focus solely on football as a senior.

== Professional career ==
=== 1997 season ===
The BC Lions selected Anderson in the fourth round of the 1997 CFL draft with the 25th overall pick. He was expected to be "groomed as [kicker] Lui Passaglia's eventual replacement". In the Lions' first preseason game, Anderson had a shaky start as a placekicker, missing two of five field goal attempts. He competed for Trevor Shaw's slotback position, but the Lions eventually decided to convert Al Shipman to slotback and retain both Shaw and Anderson as backups. Anderson contributed most as a kickoff specialist during the 1997 season, but he also was used as a punter occasionally. He played in 13 regular season games as a rookie.

=== 1998 season ===
Anderson again competed for a roster spot as a slotback in 1998. Despite catching five receptions for 45 yards in a preseason game, Anderson failed to make the roster as a slotback and was released as part of the Lions' final roster cuts before the start of the regular season. In mid-July, slotback Shaw dislocated his shoulder and was unable to start. Anderson rejoined the team and received his first start in place of Shaw. He reclaimed his kickoff role later that month before suffering a groin injury. Anderson's injury prevented him from playing for the entirety of August, and he was unable to perform kickoffs even after his return to special teams. He finished his limited season with 13 regular season appearances.

=== 1999 season ===
Anderson played in all 18 regular season games in 1999, mostly as a kickoff specialist. Anderson acted as a backup kicker for Passaglia on field goals, but he didn't kick any field goals despite Passaglia suffering an adbdominal muscle injury in the early season. Anderson recorded a career-high 21 special team tackles, including five against the Montreal Alouettes in early September.

=== 2000 season ===
After receiver Don Blair underwent surgery, Anderson again competed for a starting slotback role. He injured his knee while playing in a preseason game against the Calgary Stampeders, preventing him from continuing in the role during the regular season. Although activated briefly for a game in late July, Anderson was later moved to the nine-week injured list and did not return until October. He finished with four regular season games played in 2000.

In the West final against the Stampeders, one of Anderson's kickoffs landed short, bounced off a Lions player's leg, and went out of bounds to allow the Lions to regain possession. This helped contribute to a 37–23 win, which was considered a major upset. The Lions went on to win the 88th Grey Cup against the 27–21 against the Alouettes, making Anderson a Grey Cup champion.

=== 2001 season ===
After winning the Grey Cup, Passaglia elected to retire. Anderson competed with Jamie Boreham and Matt Kellett for kicking and punting duties. The Lions elected to use Anderson more as a receiver than kicker with the Lions coaching staff believing he could have a "breakout season". In the season opener against the Edmonton Eskimos, Anderson scored his first career receiving touchdown, following it with a single on the resulting kickoff. Due to a hip pointer and back injury suffered during the opener, Anderson spent multiple stints on the injured list in July and early August. After returning to the team in mid-August, Anderson was effective on special teams, blocking a punt in two consecutive games.

Due to various injuries, Anderson spent September as back-ups at receiver, kicker, and quarterback. He spent some time playing both receiver and kicker in late September due to injuries and a kicking slump by Kellett, respectively. Anderson finished the season with 189 receiving yards on 18 catches over 15 regular season games, his largest receiving load with the Lions up to that time.

=== 2002 season ===
Anderson was re-signed by the Lions in January 2002. Anderson solidified his role as a starting receiver during the preseason. He briefly missed time in late July with a knee issue. In October, Anderson scored a single on a trick play as the first half ended when he caught a 30-yard reception and immediately kicked it into the endzone, where it was recovered by the Calgary Stampeders. The 2002 season was Anderson's most successful as a receiver with 409 receiving yards on 28 catches, both lasting career highs.

=== 2003 season ===
Anderson played slotback regularly during June and July while Jason Clermont was injured. By mid-July, Anderson had 11 receptions for 158 yards. He slowed down through the rest of the season after Clermont returned, finishing with 20 catches for 237 yards and two touchdowns. In November, Anderson signed a contract extension for one year with an option.

=== 2004 season ===
In July, Lions head coach Wally Buono had Anderson kick field goals in practice, announcing that Anderson may take over that responsibility if kicker Duncan O'Mahony continued to perform poorly. Having already lost his kickoff role to O'Mahony, Anderson had no consistent role on the team in 2004 other than as a special teams player. In late July, Anderson announced he was leaving the Lions to become a firefighter full-time. Anderson's departure was reported as a retirement. He played in five regular season games during 2004 before leaving the Lions.

=== 2005 season ===
In April 2005, Buono negotiated with the Port Coquitlam Fire Department to allow Anderson to work both jobs simultaneously. Anderson re-signed with the Lions in June, missing training camp but joining the team before the regular season started. Anderson served as a backup slotback and kicker. In late July, he played most of a game at slotback due to a hamstring injury to Geroy Simon. In August, he regained kickoff duties from O'Mahony. After O'Mahony missed three field goals in an October game against the Saskatchewan Roughriders, Anderson attempted a 48-yard field goal to tie the game with less than a minute left to play. The field goal was blocked, resulting in a loss. O'Mahony was later replaced by Mark McLoughlin with Anderson remaining the backup field goal kicker.

The Lions' kicker issues persisted into the postseason. In the final game of the regular season, Anderson injured his ribs on the opening kickoff and was replaced by McLoughlin, who later damaged his hamstring. Anderson healed in time to perform kickoffs in the West Final against the Eskimos, which the Lions lost 23–28.

=== 2006 season ===
Anderson "retired" prior to the beginning of training camp in 2006 as part of a deal between the Lions and the Port Coquitlam Fire Department. Anderson worked regular shifts as a firefighter throughout training camp before rejoining the team in early June, immediately before the start of the regular season.

=== Season statistics ===
			Receiving					Kicking							Misc		
Year	Team	GP	Rec	Yds	Avg	Long	TD	Kickoffs	Yds	Avg	Long	Singles	FG	Con	Tkls	FUM	FR
1997	BC	13	0	0	0.0	0	0	52	2,728	52.5	67	0	0	0	7	0	0
1998	BC	13	1	12	12.0	12	0	13	762	58.6	67	0	0	0	12	0	0
1999	BC	18	1	9	9.0	9	0	73	4,087	56.0	89	2	0	0	21	0	0
2000	BC	7	5	49	9.8	13	0	13	698	53.7	67	0	0	0	10	0	0
2001	BC	15	18	189	10.5	16	1	27	1,540	57.0	85	1	0	0	7	1	0
2002	BC	18	28	409	14.6	33	1	9	511	56.8	62	1	0	0	7	1	0
2003	BC	18	20	237	11.9	36	2	0	0	0.0	0	0	0	0	5	0	1
2004	BC	5	0	0	0.0	0	0	0	0	0.0	0	0	0	0	0	0	0
2005	BC	18	3	25	8.3	11	0	57	3,165	55.5	91	1	0	0	11	1	0
2006	BC	18	7	75	10.7	15	0	71	3,995	56.3	71	0	0	0	8	1	0
2007	BC	18	1	14	14.0	14	0	82	4,695	57.3	67	0	4	2	5	0	0
2008	BC	15	9	118	13.1	28	1	30	1,700	56.7	65	0	0	0	3	1	0
2009	BC	5	0	0	0.0	0	0	0	0	0.0	0	0	0	0	0	0	0
Total		181	93	1,137	12.2	36	5	427	23,881	55.9	91	5	4	2	96	5	1

== Personal life and career ==
Anderson has three daughters and a son with his wife, Jennifer. Anderson's father, Al Anderson, played American football at Western Washington University before declining a contract from the BC Lions in favour of becoming a high school teacher.

In 2003, while Anderson was playing for the Lions, he was trained as a firefighter with the expectation that he may lose his position on the team after that season. He accepted a job at the Port Coquitlam Fire Department in July 2004.
