= Jamie Taras =

Canadian football player (born 1966)

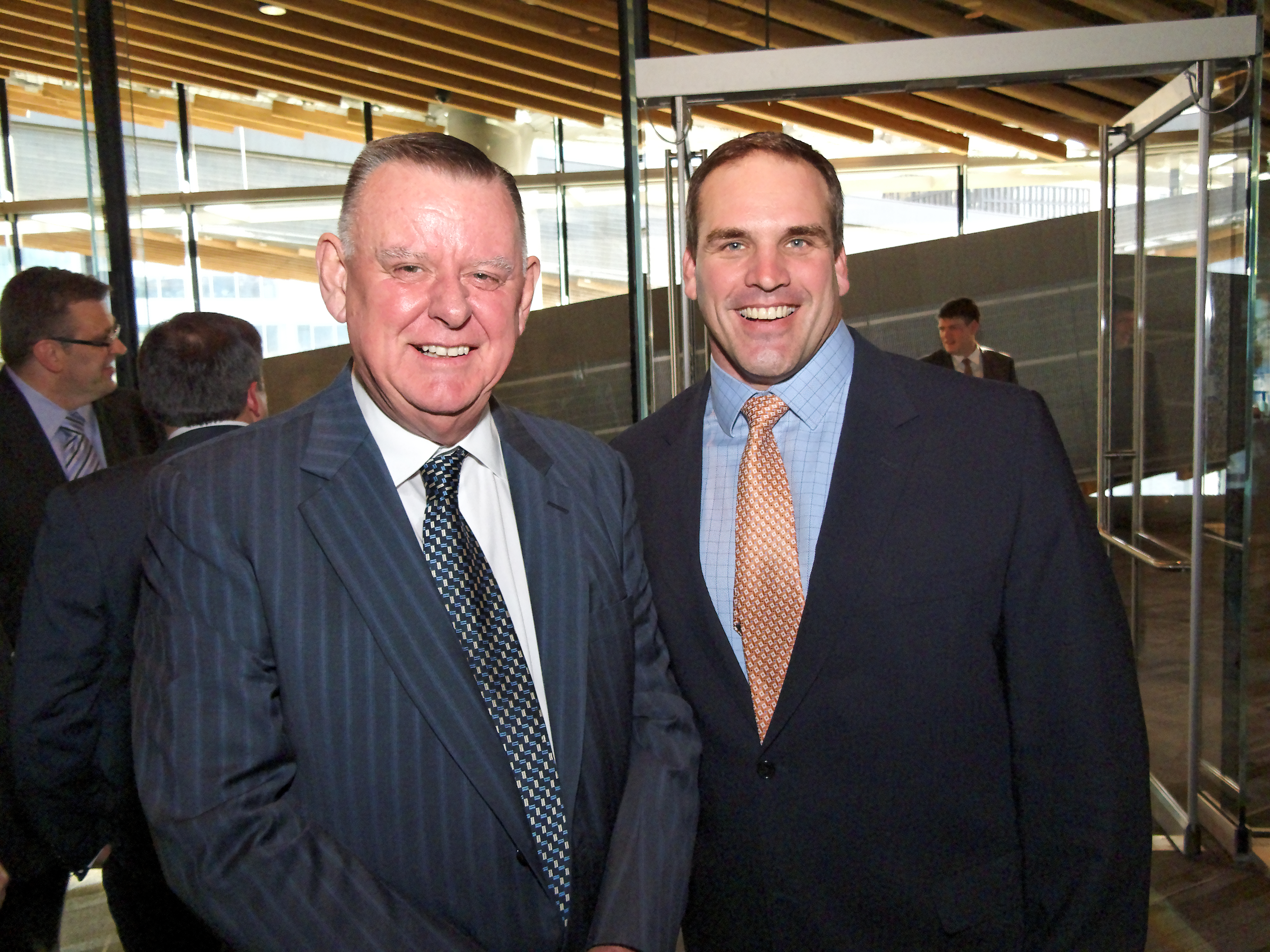
- Taras (right)

Profile
- Positions: Centre, Guard, Fullback

Personal information
- Born: January 31, 1966 (age 60); Acton, Ontario, Canada

Career information
- University: Western Ontario
- CFL draft: 1987: 3rd round, 25th overall pick

Career history
- 1987–2003: BC Lions

Awards and highlights
- 2× Grey Cup champion (1994, 2000); Dr. Beattie Martin Trophy (1999); 2× DeMarco–Becket Memorial Trophy (1995, 1999); Tom Pate Memorial Award (1999); 2× CFL All-Star (1995, 1999); 3× CFL West All-Star (1999, 2001, 2002); BC Lions #60 retired

Jamie Taras (born January 31, 1966) is a Canadian former professional football player for the BC Lions of the Canadian Football League (CFL). He is currently the director of community relations with the BC Lions. Taras spent his entire 16-year career with the Lions as a fullback and offensive lineman, and played on two Grey Cup championship teams with the club.

Taras played Canadian college football at the University of Western Ontario. In 2003, Taras was voted a member of the B.C. Lions All-Time Dream Team as part of the club's 50th anniversary celebration. Taras' number 60 jersey is one of eleven numbers retired by the B.C. Lions.

== Early life and college ==
From 1979 to 1983, Taras played high school football at Bishop MacDonell High School in Guelph, Ontario. From 1983 to 1986, he played Canadian college football at the University of Western Ontario. Taras was an offensive guard for the Mustangs.

== Professional career ==
Following his graduation from the University of Western Ontario, Taras was drafted by the B.C. Lions in the third round of the 1987 CFL Draft as a guard. Taras initially played fullback for the Lions for four years, but achieved the greatest success of his playing career as an offensive guard, and later, center.

In 1994, Taras was a part of the Lions' 11-6-1 season that culminated in a Grey Cup matchup with the Baltimore Stallions. The Lions ultimately prevailed, 26–23. The following season, 1995, Taras, playing guard, was named a CFL All-Star for the first time. Taras would be named a CFL All-Star a second time, in 1999, for his play at center. Taras twice won the DeMarco-Becket Memorial Trophy as the CFL Western Division's Most Outstanding Lineman, in 1995 and 1999. In 1999, Taras was also awarded the Dr. Beattie Martin Trophy as the Most Outstanding Canadian in the CFL Western Division, and the Tom Pate Memorial Award, for his outstanding sportsmanship and service to the community.

In 2000, Taras was a member of the Lion's fourth Grey Cup championship team. The Lions defeated the Montreal Alouettes 28–26, with Taras snapping the ball to then-Lions quarterback, Damon Allen.

Taras retired from the Lions in 2003, and was voted a member of the B.C. Lions All-Time Dream Team, at the guard position, as part of the club's 50 year anniversary celebration. Taras #60 was also retired by the Lions. His jersey number was worn during the 2006 CFL season by then Lions tackle, Jason Jimenez.

== Post-football life ==
Following his retirement in 2003, Taras became the Vice-President of the Canadian Football League Players' Association. Now the Director of Community Relations with the BC Lions.

Taras currently resides in South Surrey, British Columbia with his wife Jennifer and their two children, Sydney and William. Taras is very active in the Greater Vancouver area in community and charitable activities.
