= David De La Perralle =

Canadian gridiron football player (born 1975)

David De La Peralle
No. 57, 53
- Position: Offensive lineman

Personal information
- Born: May 22, 1975 (age 51); Montreal, Quebec, Canada
- Listed height: 6 ft 7 in (2.01 m)
- Listed weight: 320 lb (145 kg)

Career information
- College: Kentucky
- CFL draft: 1999: 1st round, 2nd overall pick

Career history
- 1999–2001: Toronto Argonauts
- 2002–2004: Ottawa Renegades
- 2005: Calgary Stampeders
- Stats at CFL.ca

David De La Peralle (born May 22, 1975) is a Canadian former professional football offensive lineman who played five seasons in the Canadian Football League (CFL) with the Toronto Argonauts, Ottawa Renegades, and Calgary Stampeders. He was selected by the Argonauts with the second overall pick of the 1999 CFL draft. He first enrolled at Vanier College before transferring to the University of Kentucky.

== Early life and college ==
David De La Peralle was born on May 22, 1975, in Montreal. He played CEGEP football at Vanier College in Montreal. He helped Vanier advance to the Quebec provincial finals both seasons he was there.

De La Peralle played college football for the Kentucky Wildcats of the University of Kentucky from 1996 to 1997. He was a letterman in 1996, and was named the team's lineman of the year. He alternated between guard and tackle while at Kentucky.

== Professional career ==
De La Perralle was selected by the Toronto Argonauts of the Canadian Football League (CFL) in the first round, with the second overall pick, of the 1999 CFL draft. Upon drafting De La Perralle, Argonauts head coach Jim Barker stated "We're extremely delighted. We got the player we wanted." De La Perralle dressed in 13 games during his rookie year in 1999. He missed the entire 2000 season due to injury. He was released by the Argonauts on June 23, 2001.

De La Perralle signed with the Ottawa Renegades on February 27, 2002. He dressed in eight games for the Renegades in 2002 and posted one tackle. He dressed in five games in 2003 before missing the rest of the season due to injury. De La Perralle re-signed with Ottawa on November 26, 2003. He was on the injured list for the first four games of the 2004 season before being released.

De La Perralle was signed by the Calgary Stampeders on February 18, 2005. He dressed in all 18 games for the Stampeders during the 2005 season, primarily as the team's sixth offensive lineman. He also dressed for the West semifinal game. De La Perralle was released by the Stampeders on May 4, 2006. He stood 6'7" and weighed 320 pounds during his CFL career.
