= Mathieu Beaudoin (Canadian football) =

Canadian football player (born 1974)

No. 53
- Positions: Offensive lineman, Defensive lineman

Personal information
- Born: November 9, 1974 (age 51); Montreal, Quebec, Canada
- Listed height: 6 ft 3 in (1.91 m)
- Listed weight: 277 lb (126 kg)

Career information
- College: Syracuse (1995–1998)
- CFL draft: 1999: 2nd round, 11th overall pick

Career history
- 1999: BC Lions
- 2000: Winnipeg Blue Bombers*
- * Offseason or practice squad member only

Mathieu Beaudoin (born November 9, 1974) is a Canadian former professional football lineman who played one season with the BC Lions of the Canadian Football League (CFL). He was selected by the Lions in the second round of the 1999 CFL draft after playing college football at Syracuse University.

== Early life ==
Mathieu Beaudoin was born on November 9, 1974, in Montreal. He was a member of the Syracuse Orange of Syracuse University from 1995 to 1998. He was a letterman in 1998. Beaudoin was originally a defensive tackle at Syracuse but converted to offensive tackle before his senior year. He only played in eight games during his college career, including two as a senior. Due to injuries at tight end, Beaudoin played both offensive tackle and tight end in the November 21, 1998 game against Temple, wearing jersey number 75 at tackle and 91 at tight end. He was the No. 4 offensive tackle on the depth chart in 1998. To the surpise of local media, Beaudoin announced that he was skipping his senior year to enter the 1999 NFL draft. The Post-Standard speculated that he may have entered the NFL draft in order to enhance his CFL value.

== Professional career ==
Beaudoin was rated the 38th best, out of 38 offensive guards, in the 1999 NFL draft by NFLDraftScout.com. He was selected by the BC Lions in the second round, with the 11th overall pick, of the 1999 CFL draft. He officially signed with the team on May 12, 1999. He played both offensive line and defensive line during the 1999 season. Beaudoin dressed in ten games for the Lions in 1999, posting one special teams tackle. He wore jersey number 53 while with the Lions. He was listed at 6'3" and 277 pounds.

On March 13, 2000, Beaudoin, Antonio Armstrong, and a fifth round pick in the 2000 CFL draft were traded to the Winnipeg Blue Bombers for Sean Millington. Beaudoin retired in June 2000 to work for a Montreal cable company.
