= Stéphane Fortin =

Canadian gridiron football player (born 1974)

No. 27, 35, 6
- Position: Defensive back

Personal information
- Born: June 21, 1974 (age 52); Laval, Quebec, Canada
- Listed height: 5 ft 11 in (1.80 m)
- Listed weight: 184 lb (83 kg)

Career information
- College: Indianapolis
- CFL draft: 1999: 2nd round, 10th overall pick

Career history
- 1999–2001: Saskatchewan Roughriders
- 2002–2004: Montreal Alouettes
- 2005: Calgary Stampeders

Awards and highlights
- Grey Cup champion (2002)
- Stats at CFL.ca

Stéphane Fortin (born June 21, 1974) is a Canadian former professional football defensive back who played seven seasons in the Canadian Football League (CFL) with the Saskatchewan Roughriders, Montreal Alouettes, and Calgary Stampeders. He was drafted by the Saskatchewan Roughriders in the second round of the 1999 CFL draft. Fortin played college football at the University of Indianapolis. He was a member of the Montreal Alouettes team that won the 90th Grey Cup.

== Early life ==
Stéphane Fortin was born on June 21, 1974, in Laval, Quebec. He played college football at the University of Indianapolis, where he was a three-year letterman for the Indianapolis Greyhounds from 1996 to 1998.

== Professional career ==
Fortin was selected by the Saskatchewan Roughriders in the second round, with the tenth overall pick, of the 1999 CFL draft. He dressed in 50 games for the Roughriders from 1999 to 2001.

Fortin became a free agent after the 2001 season, and signed with the Montreal Alouettes on March 4, 2002. On November 24, 2002, the Alouettes won the 90th Grey Cup against the Edmonton Eskimos by a score of 25–16. He was honoured by the City of Laval after the Grey Cup win. He re-signed with the team on February 19, 2004. Fortin dressed in 53 games overall for Montreal from 2002 to 2004.

Fortin became a free agent again after the 2004 season and signed with the Calgary Stampeders. He dressed in only three games during his final CFL season in 2005. He finished his CFL career with totals of 103 games dressed, 50 defensive tackles, 51 special teams tackles, one forced fumble, and three fumble recoveries for 92 yards and two touchdowns.

== Personal life ==
Fortin became a financial advisor after his CFL career.
