= Cory Mantyka =

Canadian gridiron football player (born 1970)

Profile
- Position: Offensive tackle

Personal information
- Born: May 31, 1970 (age 56); Saskatoon, Saskatchewan, Canada

Career information
- College: Jamestown College

Career history
- 1993–2005: British Columbia Lions

Awards and highlights
- 2× Grey Cup champion (1994, 2000); CFL West All-Star (2004)
- Stats at CFL.ca (archive)

Cory Mantyka (born May 31, 1970) is a Canadian former professional football player with the Canadian Football League (CFL)'s the British Columbia Lions. After playing college football at Jamestown College as defensive lineman, Mantyka spent the majority of his 13-year CFL career as an offensive lineman. Mantyka started out on special teams his first year, clocking an amazing 4.65 40 yard dash at 265 lbs. In his second season he spent time on both sides of the ball, as well as still contributing as a special teams player. In his third season he settled in on the offensive line where he was a mainstay and leader for the rest of his career. His 203 regular seasons starts puts him near the top of a short list of legends to have played over 200 games. He was named CFL Western All-Star in 2004 and was a part of the Lions Grey Cup victories in 1994 and 2000.
