= Sean Millington =

Canadian football player (born 1968)

No. 35, 25
- Position: Running back

Personal information
- Born: February 1, 1968 (age 58); Vancouver, British Columbia, Canada
- Listed height: 6 ft 3 in (1.91 m)
- Listed weight: 237 lb (108 kg)

Career information
- University: Simon Fraser
- CFL draft: 1990: 1st round, 1st overall pick

Career history
- 1991: Edmonton Eskimos
- 1991–1997: BC Lions
- 1998: Winnipeg Blue Bombers
- 1999: Edmonton Eskimos
- 2000–2002: BC Lions
- 2005: Toronto Argonauts

Awards and highlights
- 2× Grey Cup champion (1994, 2000); 2× CFL's Most Outstanding Canadian Award (1997, 2000); 3× Dr. Beattie Martin Trophy (1997, 2000, 2002); Dick Suderman Trophy (2000); 3× CFL All-Star (1993, 1994, 2000); 4× CFL West All-Star (1993, 1994, 1996, 2000); BC Lions single game rushing record (212 yards) August 15, 1997; Edmonton Eskimos single game rushing record (225 yards) October 30, 1999
- Canadian Football Hall of Fame (Class of 2026)

Sean Millington (born February 1, 1968) is a Canadian former professional football fullback in the Canadian Football League (CFL). He currently does colour commentary for the CFL's website and the CBC. He has also acted in several movies and television shows.

== Amateur career ==
In 1984, Millington was a student at Carson Graham Secondary School. The rugby season had changed from fall to spring, so he decided to try out for football. The coach took notice of his size and suggested he start out as an offensive lineman. The following year Millington convinced the coach to let him try out at running back.

After high school Millington attended Simon Fraser University, playing with the Simon Fraser Clan. After he graduated, he was trying out for the New York Giants. During those tryouts Millington was quoted in an interview with SLAM! Sports in August 2006, that the best advice that he ever received was from then Giants head coach Bill Parcells, who told him that "he was a diamond in the rough and that he needed to get more experience." Parcells then advised Millington to get that experience in the Canadian Football League and work hard there and things would work out. Millington replied that Parcells was right.

== Professional career ==
Millington played fullback in the CFL for 12 years with the Edmonton Eskimos, the Winnipeg Blue Bombers and the British Columbia Lions before his retirement in 2002.

While playing for the Edmonton Eskimos, he rushed for 225 yards on 29 carries in a game against the visiting Saskatchewan Roughriders on October 30, 1999. He was the most recent Canadian fullback to rush for over 200 yards in a game, until Jesse Lumsden was rushed for 211 yards against the Winnipeg Blue Bombers on August 3, 2007.

Most of Millington's accomplishments were with the B.C. Lions - whom he played with the most in those 12 years (1991–97, 2000–02). He was known as the "Diesel." With the Lions Millington was a two-time Grey Cup champion and was named the Grey Cup's Most Valuable Canadian in the 88th Grey Cup game in 2000. In that same year, Millington rushed for 1010 yards on 156 carries and ran for 6 touchdowns, while sharing the backfield duties with import Robert Drummond. He was only the 6th Canadian to rush for a thousand yards in a season.

Other accomplishments with the Lions include Millington being named CFL West Division All-Star five times; CFL All-Star three times; CFL Most Outstanding Canadian Player in the West Division three times; CFL's Most Outstanding Canadian Award two times; and he was named as BC Lions's nominee for the league's Most Outstanding Canadian four times.

== First retirement ==
After his retirement, Millington joined the CFL on CBC in 2003 as part of the broadcast panel during pre-game and half-time shows. As part of the panel, Millington was known not to pull punches and tell things as they are, which created some interesting dialogue with former CFLer Greg Frers, with former teammate Darren Flutie and with his former GM Eric Tillman. However, after the 92nd Grey Cup game in 2004, Millington decided to resurrect his football career.

== Return to football ==
After two years without football, Millington came out of retirement to play another year for the Toronto Argonauts in 2005. The Argonauts had a need for Millington's services, because in his 12-year career he proved he could run and block with power. With John Avery's slashing style and Millington's power game, the Argos had a solid duo in the backfield. When Avery suffered a slight hamstring tear in the Argos' 35-32 win over the Winnipeg Blue Bombers on October 16, the signing of Millington paid immediate dividends. However, on October 22, Millington suffered a ruptured Achilles heel in his right foot in the second quarter of their game against the Montreal Alouettes, which ended his football career, weeks before the CFL playoffs.

== Second retirement ==
After his second retirement, Millington rejoined the CFL on CBC broadcast, and has a weekly column on the Canadian Football League's official website. Although he was acting while he was playing football, Millington started to take on more roles after his last retirement with appearances in movies such as Are We There Yet? with rapper Ice Cube, and Underworld: Evolution with Kate Beckinsale. Millington has also appeared in the television series Blade: The Series, as Bad Blood member Bolt. Millington also does personal training sessions and is an avid video game player. Following his stint at CBC, Sean decided to dust off his economics degree and go to work in the financial industry. He got a job as a business development rep with the wealth management company Sentry Select. Following his time at Sentry Select, Sean decided to join the other side of the industry by working as an investment advisor for TD Waterhouse Private Investment Advice. In his personal life, Millington has a wife and child back in Vancouver. On January 7, 2010, Sean Millington was inducted into the BC Sports Hall of Fame along with the 1994 BC Lions Championship team. He currently works as a personal trainer in Vancouver, where he has developed The Millington Method, focused on building sustainable habits and practices to create a lifestyle of fitness and health.

== Career statistics ==
		Rushing							Receiving
Year	Team	Games	No.	Yards	Avg	Long	TD	Fumb	No.	Yards	Avg	Long	TD
1991	EDM	2	0	0	0.0	0	0	0	0	0	0.0	0	0
1991	BC	4	2	12	6.0	7	0	0	0	0	0.0	0	0
1992	BC	17	8	52	6.5	12	1	0	6	60	10.0	20	0
1993	BC	18	52	276	5.3	60	5	3	38	481	12.7	70	0
1994	BC	18	97	522	5.4	65	11	0	19	112	5.9	20	0
1995	BC	7	58	318	5.5	39	6	1	14	147	10.5	39	1
1996	BC	17	74	381	5.1	26	7	1	36	386	10.7	38	3
1997	BC	16	153	865	5.7	54	5	4	49	467	9.6	29	0
1998	WPG	18	82	424	5.2	40	3	1	22	191	8.7	36	0
1999	WPG	3	10	25	2.5	6	0	0	7	55	7.9	31	0
1999	EDM	15	80	524	6.5	43	4	1	7	49	7.0	12	0
2000	BC	17	156	1,010	6.5	50	6	2	39	531	13.6	25	1
2001	BC	18	163	804	3.7	32	11	4	34	313	9.2	41	1
2002	BC	16	173	740	4.3	37	14	2	36	372	10.3	32	2
2005	TOR	8	24	128	5.3	18	2	0	5	70	14.0	23	0
CFL totals		194	1,129	6,086	5.4	65	75	19	312	3234	10.4	70	7
