= Jeff Pilon =

Canadian gridiron football player (born 1976)

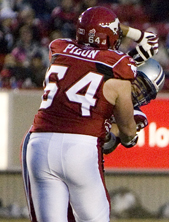
- Pilon in 2007

No. 64
- Position: Offensive tackle

Personal information
- Born: March 21, 1976 (age 50); Ottawa, Ontario, Canada
- Listed height: 6 ft 6 in (1.98 m)
- Listed weight: 319 lb (145 kg)

Career information
- College: Syracuse
- CFL draft: 1999: 3rd round, 17th overall pick

Career history
- 2000: Winnipeg Blue Bombers
- 2000: New York Jets*
- 2001: New York/New Jersey Hitmen
- 2001–2009: Calgary Stampeders
- * Offseason or practice squad member only

Awards and highlights
- 2× Grey Cup champion (2001, 2008); CFL West All-Star (2005)
- Stats at CFL.ca

Jeff T. Pilon (born March 21, 1976) is a Canadian former professional football player who was an offensive tackle in the Canadian Football League (CFL). He was selected by the Winnipeg Blue Bombers in the third round with the 17th overall pick in the 1999 CFL draft. He played college football for the Syracuse Orange.

Hall was also a member of the New York Jets, New York/New Jersey Hitmen and Calgary Stampeders. He won a Grey Cup with the Stampeders in 2001 and 2008.
