= Cameron Legault =

Canadian football player (born 1974)

No. 95
- Position: Defensive tackle

Personal information
- Born: September 25, 1974 (age 52); Ottawa, Ontario, Canada
- Listed height: 6 ft 3 in (1.91 m)
- Listed weight: 270 lb (122 kg)

Career information
- University: Carleton
- CFL draft: 1999: 2nd round, 16th overall pick

Career history
- 1999: Calgary Stampeders
- 2000–2004: BC Lions
- 2005: Ottawa Renegades
- 2006: Winnipeg Blue Bombers

Awards and highlights
- Grey Cup champion (2000); Dr. Beattie Martin Trophy (2001)
- Stats at CFL.ca

Cameron Legault (born September 25, 1974) is a former Canadian Football League defensive tackle who played for eight seasons for the Calgary Stampeders, BC Lions, Ottawa Renegades, and Winnipeg Blue Bombers. He won the 88th Grey Cup in 2000 as a member of the Lions. He played CIS football for the Carleton Ravens.
