= 1999 CFL draft =

Canadian football draft

1999 CFL Draft

General information
- Sport: Canadian football
- Date: April 13
- Time: 11:00 AM EST

Overview
- 47 total selections in 6 rounds
- League: CFL
- First selection: Rob Meier, DE; BC Lions
- Most selections (9): BC Lions
- Fewest selections (3): Winnipeg Blue Bombers
- CIAU selections: 28
- NCAA selections: 19

The 1999 CFL draft took place on Tuesday, April 13, 1999. 46 Canadian football players were chosen from eligible players from Canadian universities as well as Canadian players playing in the NCAA. Of the 46 draft selections, 28 players were drafted from Canadian Interuniversity Athletics Union institutions.

== Trades ==
In the explanations below, (D) denotes trades that took place during the draft, while (PD) indicates trades completed pre-draft. This is a partial list due to references being limited.

=== Round one ===
- Toronto → Montreal (PD). Toronto traded a first-round selection to Montreal in exchange for Nigel Williams.
- Saskatchewan → Toronto (PD). Saskatchewan traded a first-round selection to Toronto in a trade for Andrew Stewart.

=== Round two ===
- Hamilton → Winnipeg (PD). Hamilton traded a second-round selection to Winnipeg in a trade for Franco Rocca.
- Winnipeg → Edmonton (PD). Winnipeg traded a second-round selection to Edmonton in a trade for Shalon Baker.
- Winnipeg → BC (PD). Winnipeg traded a second-round selection to BC in a trade for Mike Trevathan.
- Edmonton → Montreal (PD). Edmonton traded a second-round selection to Montreal in a trade for Dwayne Provo.

=== Round four ===
- Winnipeg → Montreal (PD). Winnipeg traded a fourth-round selection to Montreal in a trade for Tom Monios.

== Forfeitures ==
- Toronto forfeited their sixth-round selection after selecting Noel Prefontaine in the 1998 Supplemental Draft.

== Draft order ==
=== Round one ===
= CFL Division All-Star	= CFL All-Star	= Hall of Famer

Pick #	CFL team	Player	Position	School
1	BC Lions (via Winnipeg)	Rob Meier	DE	Washington State
2	Toronto Argonauts (via Saskatchewan)	David De La Peralle	OL	Kentucky
3	BC Lions	Greg Lotysz	OL	North Dakota
4	Edmonton Eskimos	Trevor Bollers	FB	Iowa
5	Montreal Alouettes (via Toronto)	Sylvain Girard	WR	Concordia
6	Montreal Alouettes	Davis Sanchez	CB	Oregon
7	Hamilton Tiger-Cats	Corey Grant	WR	Wilfrid Laurier
8	Calgary Stampeders	Bobby Singh	OL	Portland State

=== Round two ===
= CFL Division All-Star	= CFL All-Star	= Hall of Famer

Pick #	CFL team	Player	Position	School
9	Edmonton Eskimos (via Winnipeg)	Aaron Williams	DE	Indiana
10	Saskatchewan Roughriders	Stephane Fortin	S	Indianapolis
11	BC Lions	Mathieu Beaudoin	OL	Syracuse
12	Montreal Alouettes (via Edmonton)	Adrian Hoople	DB	British Columbia
13	Toronto Argonauts	Wayne Shaw	CB	Kent State
14	BC Lions (via Montreal)	David Pol	OT	British Columbia
15	BC Lions (via Winnipeg via Hamilton)	Richard Mercier	OL	Miami
16	Calgary Stampeders	Cameron Legault	DT	Carleton

=== Round three ===
= CFL Division All-Star	= CFL All-Star	= Hall of Famer

Pick #	CFL team	Player	Position	School
17	Winnipeg Blue Bombers	Jeff Pilon	OL	Syracuse
18	Saskatchewan Roughriders	Kennedy Nkeyasen	RB	Idaho State University
19	BC Lions	Jason Kralt	DB	Carleton
20	Edmonton Eskimos	Éric LaPointe	RB	Mount Allison
21	Toronto Argonauts	Jean-Phillipe Darche	LB	McGill
22	Montreal Alouettes	Yannic Sermanou	DL	Howard
23	Hamilton Tiger-Cats	Morty Bryce	DB	Bowling Green
24	Calgary Stampeders	Evan Davis	RB	Concordia

=== Round four ===
Pick #	CFL team	Player	Position	School
25	Montreal Alouettes (via Winnipeg)	Brad Chalmers	OL	St. Mary's
26	Saskatchewan Roughriders	Matthew Hammer	DB	Guelph
27	BC Lions	Craig Higgins	RB	Western Ontario
28	Edmonton Eskimos	Brent Walker	WR	Mary
29	Toronto Argonauts	Andre Trudel	OL	Laval
30	Montreal Alouettes	Jeffery Anderson	DT	Concordia
31	Hamilton Tiger-Cats	Jason Tibbits	DB	Waterloo
–	Calgary Stampeders	Forfeit Pick		

=== Round five ===
Pick #	CFL team	Player	Position	School
32	Winnipeg Blue Bombers	Mike Abou-Mechrek	OL	Western Ontario
33	Saskatchewan Roughriders	Eric Sanderson	OT	York
34	BC Lions	Jason Crumb	QB	Saskatchewan
35	Edmonton Eskimos	Frantz Clarkson	CB	Manitoba
36	Toronto Argonauts	Glynn Hall	WR	St. Mary's
37	Montreal Alouettes	Kevin Lefsrud	OL	Saskatchewan
38	Hamilton Tiger-Cats	Mike MacKenzie	RB	Eastern Washington
39	Calgary Stampeders	Dan Disley	WR	Western Ontario

=== Round six ===
Pick #	CFL team	Player	Position	School
40	Winnipeg Blue Bombers	Ryan Wilkinson	QB	Waterloo
41	Saskatchewan Roughriders	Carlo Panaro	OL	Alberta
42	BC Lions	Akbal Singh	RB	British Columbia
43	Edmonton Eskimos	Orlando Bowen	DE	Northern Illinois
–	Toronto Argonauts	Forfeit Pick		
44	Montreal Alouettes	Pierre Landry	DB	Ottawa
45	Hamilton Tiger-Cats	Pascal Cheron	OL	Laval
46	Calgary Stampeders	Andy Kolaczek	OL	Calgary
