= Nepean High School (Ottawa) =

Coordinates: 45.383833°N 75.759058°W

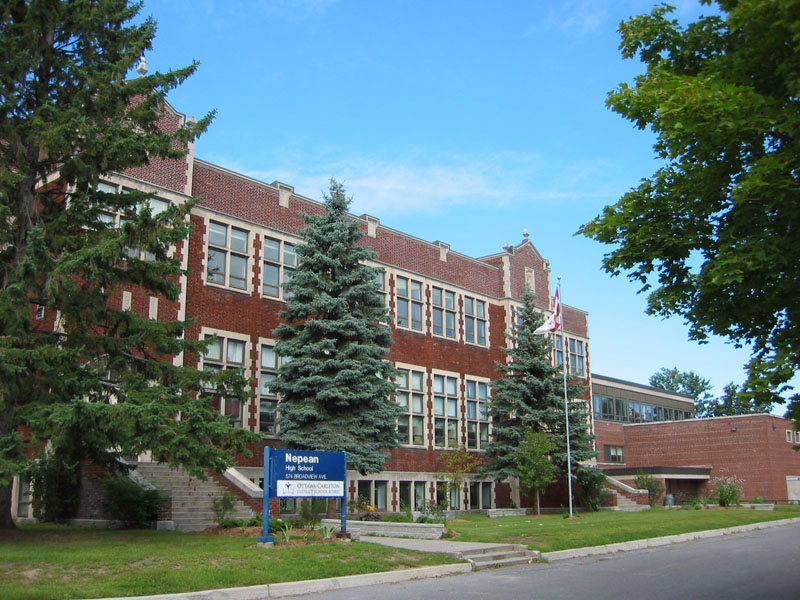

Location
- 574 Broadview Ave. Ottawa, Ontario, K2A 3V8; Canada

Information
- School type: High School
- Motto: Love purple, Live gold
- Established: 1922
- School board: Ottawa-Carleton District School Board
- Superintendent: Frank Wiley
- Principal: Tracy Shapiro
- Grades: 9–12
- Enrolment: 1,143 (2019)
- Language: English, French Immersion, Spanish
- Colours: Purple & Gold
- Mascot: Knight
- Team name: Nepean Knights
- Website: nepeanhs.ocdsb.ca

Nepean High School (often abbreviated to NHS) is a high school in Ottawa, Ontario, Canada. It is located in the Westboro neighbourhood, at 574 Broadview Avenue. There were 1160 students enrolled for 2011–2012. Tracy Shapiro is the current principal replacing Alan Johnson, the principal from 2019 to 2021.

== History ==
The school began as a continuation program at Broadview Public School. Students who wanted some years of secondary education, but were unable to travel to Ottawa Collegiate Institute could take a few courses on the top floor of Broadview. In 1919, the provincial government made school attendance mandatory until age 16, creating a rapid increase in enrollment. Carleton County thus decided to build a new high school, and Nepean High School, in Nepean Township, was founded in 1922. Nepean High School originally served a large territory west of Ottawa. In 1950, Westboro was annexed by the city of Ottawa, and the high school became part of the Ottawa Collegiate Board. In 1970, the Ottawa Collegiate Board was merged into the Ottawa Board of Education, and then in 1998, the Ottawa Board of Education and the Carleton Board of Education were amalgamated. Nepean High School then became part of the new Ottawa-Carleton District School Board.

== Academics ==
Nepean is known for its strong academic success, with roughly 94% of students graduating to higher education (53% being Ontario Scholars).

Nepean's curricular offerings include Academic/University, Applied/College, French Immersion, Extended French, Specialist High Skills Major in the Environment, Advanced Placement Courses, Leadership Development, and Cooperative Education courses.

== Athletics ==
The school is also well known for its excellent athletics program, with over 10 sports teams that are regular top contenders in the National Capital Secondary Schools Athletic Association.

Nepean boasts one of the highest number of interscholastic sports teams in the Ottawa Carleton District School Board. Nepean was ranked first overall in the inaugural Ottawa Citizen High School Sports Rankings in 2006, and placed 3rd in 2009, 5th in 2010, and 3rd in 2011. Nepean attended the Ontario Championships (OFSAA) in boys Rugby (2015, 2016), boys Soccer (2007), girls Soccer (2010), X-Country (2006–2011), Golf (2007–2011,2025), Alpine Skiing (2007–2011), Nordic Skiing (2006–2011), Track & Field (2006–2011), Field Hockey (2011, 2015, 2016), Tennis (2010–2011), and Swimming (2008–2011,2024). The boys Non-Contact Hockey won city championships in 2004, 2006, 2007 and 2008, the Junior Boys Basketball Team won the city championships in 2019 and the boys Rugby team has toured worldwide (Alberta 2004, UK 2005, and Australia 2007, 2009, 2012).

== Notable alumni ==
- Mike Crawley – politician and business leader
- Bruce Cockburn – acoustic folk musician
- Jason Kralt – former CFL player
- Kevin O'Leary – entrepreneur, television personality (Dragons' Den, Shark Tank, The Lang and O'Leary Exchange)
- Maria del Mar – Gemini and ACTRA winning actress
- Michael Marder – philosopher
- Mark Rowswell – media personality
- Dustin Cook – Canadian World Cup alpine ski racer
- Peter Wintonick – Canadian documentary film maker and Governor General Award Winner.
- David Williams – former professional road cyclist.
- Sarah Weinman - Journalist and author.

== See also ==
- Education in Ontario
- List of secondary schools in Ontario
