= Corey Grant =

Canadian football player and coach (born 1976)

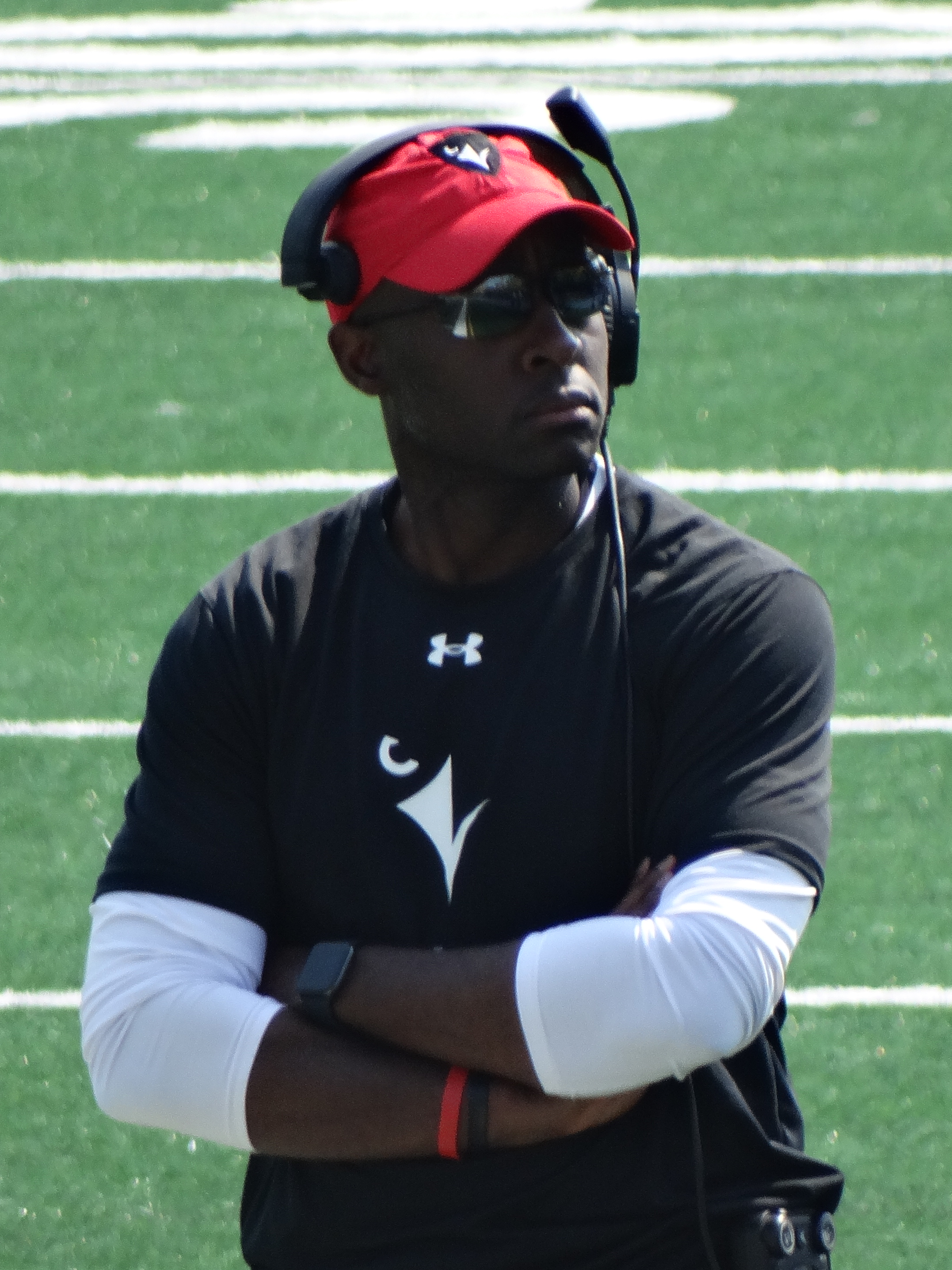
- Grant with the Carleton Ravens in 2024

Personal information
- Born: December 22, 1976 (age 49); Stoney Creek, Ontario, Canada
- Listed height: 5 ft 11 in (1.80 m)
- Listed weight: 205 lb (93 kg)

Career information
- Position: Wide receiver (No. 2)
- University: Wilfrid Laurier
- CFL draft: 1999: 1st round, 7th overall pick

Career history

Playing
- 1999–2001: Hamilton Tiger-Cats
- 2002: Montreal Alouettes
- 2002–2008: Saskatchewan Roughriders
- 2009: Hamilton Tiger-Cats

Coaching
- 2010–2011: McMaster Marauders (WRC)
- 2013–2018: Hamilton Tiger-Cats (RBC)
- 2019–2021: McMaster Marauders (OC)
- 2022–2026: Carleton Ravens (HC)

Awards and highlights
- 2× Grey Cup champion (1999, 2007); Vanier Cup champion (2011); Frank M. Gibson Trophy (1999)
- Stats at CFL.ca (archive)

Corey Grant (born December 22, 1976) is a Canadian football coach who was most recently the head coach for the Carleton Ravens of U Sports football. He is a former professional wide receiver in the Canadian Football League where he played for 11 years and won two Grey Cup championships.

== University career ==
Grant played CIAU football for the Wilfrid Laurier Golden Hawks from 1995 to 1998.

== Professional career ==
=== Hamilton Tiger-Cats ===
Upon completing his university career, Grant was drafted by the Hamilton Tiger-Cats with the seventh overall pick in the 1999 CFL draft. He played and started in all 18 regular season games where he had 56 catches for 875 yards and three touchdowns and won the Frank M. Gibson Trophy as the East Division's Most Outstanding Rookie. He capped off the season by winning his first Grey Cup championship as the Tiger-Cats defeated the Calgary Stampeders in the 87th Grey Cup game. He spent the 2000 and 2001 seasons with the Tiger-Cats before becoming a free agent.

=== Montreal Alouettes ===
Ahead of the 2002 season, Grant signed with the Montreal Alouettes. He played in 13 games where he had 25 receptions for 385 yards.

=== Saskatchewan Roughriders ===
Midway through the 2002 CFL season, Grant was traded to the Saskatchewan Roughriders in exchange for second round draft picks in the 2003 CFL draft and the 2004 CFL draft. He dressed as a backup receiver for the remaining five regular season games and the East Semi-Final. In 2003, he played in all 18 regular season games where he had 39 catches for 511 yards and three touchdowns. He played for the Roughriders for seven seasons which was highlighted by the 2007 Grey Cup victory over the Winnipeg Blue Bombers where Grant had two receptions for 20 yards in the championship game.

=== Hamilton Tiger-Cats (II) ===
Grant returned to the Hamilton Tiger-Cats on June 26, 2009. He played in eight regular season games where he had nine catches for 89 yards and one touchdown. He retired just prior to the 2010 CFL season on June 3, 2010.

== Coaching career ==
=== McMaster Marauders ===
Following his playing career, Grant was hired by the McMaster Marauders to serve as the team's receivers coach beginning with the 2010 season. In 2011, the Marauders won the first Vanier Cup in program history as the team defeated the Laval Rouge et Or in the 47th Vanier Cup. Under Grant's coaching, receiver Michael DiCroce was named the OUA MVP that year. Grant spent two years with the Marauders but left the program in 2012.

=== Hamilton Tiger-Cats ===
On March 21, 2013, Grant was named the running backs coach and offensive quality control coach for the Hamilton Tiger-Cats. He spent six seasons with the Tiger-Cats where the team made two appearances in the Grey Cup.

=== McMaster Marauders (II) ===
Grant returned to the McMaster Marauders on January 31, 2019, where he was named the team's offensive coordinator. He spent three years and two seasons in that capacity, where the team won the Yates Cup in his first season, but failed to qualify for the playoffs with a 3–3 record in the COVID-19 shortened 2021 season. While at McMaster, Grant established the Female Coaching Apprenticeship program, the first of its kind in U Sports in which two assistant coaching positions were recruited and filled.

=== Carleton Ravens ===
On March 18, 2022, it was announced that Grant had been hired as the head coach for the Carleton Ravens. He led the Ravens to the post-season in each of his first two seasons, losing in the first round in each year. The team missed the playoffs in the following three seasons and bottomed out in 2026 when they won just one game. On November 10, 2026, Carleton announced that Grant would not be retained for the 2027 season.

== Personal life ==
Grant and his wife, Jennifer, have two children, Qiawna and Devonn.

== Head coaching record ==
Year	Team	Overall	Conference	Standing	Playoffs
Carleton Ravens (OUA) (2022–present)
2022	Carleton	5–4	5–3	5th	Lost in quarter-final 41-13
2023	Carleton	4–5	4–4	6th	Lost in quarter-final 14-11
2024	Carleton	2–6	2–6	8th	
2025	Carleton	3–5	3–5	8th	
2026	Carleton	1–7	1–7	10th	
Carleton:		15–27	15–25		
Total:		15–27			
