= 82nd Grey Cup =

1994 Canadian Football championship game

BC Lions	Baltimore F.C.
(11–6–1)	(12–6)
26	23
Head coach: Dave Ritchie	Head coach: Don Matthews
	1	2	3	4	Total
BC Lions	3	7	10	6	26
Baltimore F.C.	0	17	3	3	23
- Date: November 27, 1994
- Stadium: BC Place Stadium
- Location: Vancouver
- Most Valuable Player: Karl Anthony, DB (Baltimore)
- Most Valuable Canadian: Lui Passaglia, K/P (Lions)
- Referee: Jake Ireland
- Halftime show: Tom Cochrane
- Attendance: 55,097

Broadcasters
- Network: CBC, RDS
- Announcers: (CBC) Don Wittman (play-by-play), James Curry and Dan Kepley (colour), Steve Armitage (sideline reporter, trophy presentation), Mark Lee (sideline reporter), Brian Williams (host), Ron Lancaster and Matt Dunigan (analysts).

The 82nd Grey Cup was the 1994 Canadian Football League championship game played between the Baltimore Football Club and the BC Lions at BC Place Stadium in Vancouver, British Columbia. It was the first championship in professional football history to feature a United States-vs-Canada matchup. The Lions won the game by a score of 26–23, on a last second field-goal by Lui Passaglia.

== Game summary ==
BC Lions (26) – TDs, Charles Gordon, Danny McManus; FGs, Lui Passaglia (4); cons., Passaglia (2).

Baltimore F.C. (23) – TDs, Tracy Ham, Karl Anthony; FGs, Donald Igwebuike (3); cons., Igwebuike (2).

First quarter
BC – FG Passaglia 47-yard field goal 2:24
Second quarter
BAL – TD Ham 1-yard run (Igwebuike convert) 8:39
BAL – TD Anthony 46-yard lateral interception return from Walton (Igwebuike convert) 9:21
BC – TD Gordon 17-yard interception return (Passaglia convert) 12:48
BAL – FG Igwebuike 17-yard field goal 14:08
Third quarter
BAL – FG Igwebuike 26-yard field goal 4:34
BC – TD McManus 1-yard run (Passaglia convert) 9:39
BC – FG Passaglia 42-yard field goal 14:08
Fourth quarter
BC – FG Passaglia 27-yard field goal 3:09
BAL – FG Igwebuike 29-yard field goal 8:26
BC – FG Passaglia 38-yard field goal 15:00

The Grey Cup, exclusively a Canadian event for the first 82 seasons of its existence, became an international affair when Baltimore became the first U.S.-based club to vie for the trophy. The appearance of an American team in the Grey Cup united Canadian fans for the first time behind the Lions as representatives of Canada. The 82nd Grey Cup is considered by many to be one of the ten best Grey Cup games of all time, because it was a nail-biter from start to finish.

Kent Austin started at quarterback for the Lions, which was somewhat of a surprise given that his backup, Danny McManus, engineered a last-second victory over the Calgary Stampeders in the West Final. Austin was playing with a tender left shoulder, but it didn't prevent him from moving the Lions downfield to set up Lui Passaglia's 47-yard field goal for the initial points of the game.

Baltimore responded in the second quarter to take a 14–3 lead. Quarterback Tracy Ham put Baltimore on the scoreboard on a one-yard run, while Alvin Walton picked off an Austin throw and completed a lateral pass to Karl Anthony who scampered 36 yards for Baltimore's second touchdown.

The Lions got a defensive touchdown of their own when Charles Gordon intercepted a pass by Ham and scored on a 17-yard return. Baltimore added a late field goal by Donald Igwebuike to take a 17–10 halftime lead.

Austin, who was playing with an injured shoulder, was ineffective for B.C., getting intercepted three times. With a minute remaining in the first half, head coach Dave Ritchie turned to Danny McManus. A week earlier in the Western Final, McManus had also relieved an injured Austin and orchestrated a second-half come-back.

Baltimore added to its lead with another field goal. But the momentum shifted in B.C.'s favour late in the third quarter. Setting up for a 34-yard field goal, holder Darren Flutie took the ball, jumped to his feet and ran to his right to the 10-yard line, giving the Lions a first down. Three plays later, McManus scored on a third down gamble.

B.C. tied the score with 52 seconds remaining in the third quarter on Passaglia's 42-yard field goal. The score was deadlocked at 23–23 after both clubs exchanged field goals in the fourth quarter.

Passaglia had an opportunity to kick a 37-yard field goal with 1:02 left in regulation, but he missed. However, Baltimore was unable to advance the ball on their next possession, going two-and-out, and giving the ball back to BC with excellent field position. Passaglia received another opportunity for the winning kick with no time remaining, and he made good on a 38-yard attempt to keep the Grey Cup in Canada. Passaglia's last-second field goal was named the greatest play in BC Lions history in 2007.

=== Statistics and awards ===
At the end of the game, Lions kicker Lui Passaglia was announced as the Most Valuable Player and awarded the trophy. Running Back Sean Millington was announced as the Most Valuable Canadian. However, it was later learned that the actual winner of the MVP vote was Baltimore's Karl Anthony, who was the first player to be awarded with such an honour in a losing cause. The vote had actually taken place before Passaglia's game-winning field goal, while the game was still tied. Instead of receiving MVP honours, Passaglia was awarded with the Most Valuable Canadian Award for the second time in his career.

Baltimore's all-star running back, Mike Pringle had only 71-yards rushing and fullback Robert Drummond had 38-yards rushing for a total of 109 yards. The Lions rushing tandem of running back Cory Philpot and fullback Sean Millington combined for 194-yards rushing, with Philpot having 17 carries, for 109-yards rushing and Millington having 13 carries, for 85-yards rushing. Furthermore, Philpot and Millington gained those yards against an impressive Baltimore defence that was exempt from following the CFL's import rule and was made up solely of American players. There is a common perception that such a team would be stronger than one which was required to have Canadian players.

The same Lions defence that limited Baltimore's running game, were also able to get four sacks on Baltimore's Tracy Ham and John Congemi (sacked on his only play of the game). The Lions' defensive front of Andrew Stewart, Angelo Snipes, Doug Petersen and Henry Newby had one sack, each.

The teams had about equal time of possession, with the Lions having 31:22 compared to Baltimore's 28:38.

== Trivia ==
This was the last Grey Cup to be won by the host city until 2011, which was also won by the BC Lions at BC Place.

The 1994 BC Lions Championship team was inducted to the BC Sports Hall of Fame, which is located inside BC Place Stadium.

== 1994 CFL playoffs ==
=== West Division ===
- Semi-final (November 12 @ Edmonton, Alberta) BC Lions 24–23 Edmonton Eskimos
- Semi-final (November 13 @ Calgary, Alberta) Calgary Stampeders 36–3 Saskatchewan Roughriders
- Final (November 20 @ Calgary, Alberta) BC Lions 37–36 Calgary Stampeders

=== East Division ===
- Semi-final (November 12 @ Baltimore, Maryland) Baltimore Football Club 34–15 Toronto Argonauts
- Semi-final (November 13 @ Winnipeg, Manitoba) Winnipeg Blue Bombers 26–16 Ottawa Rough Riders
- Final (November 20 @ Winnipeg, Manitoba) Baltimore Football Club 14–12 Winnipeg Blue Bombers
