= Damon Allen =

Canadian gridiron football player (born 1963)

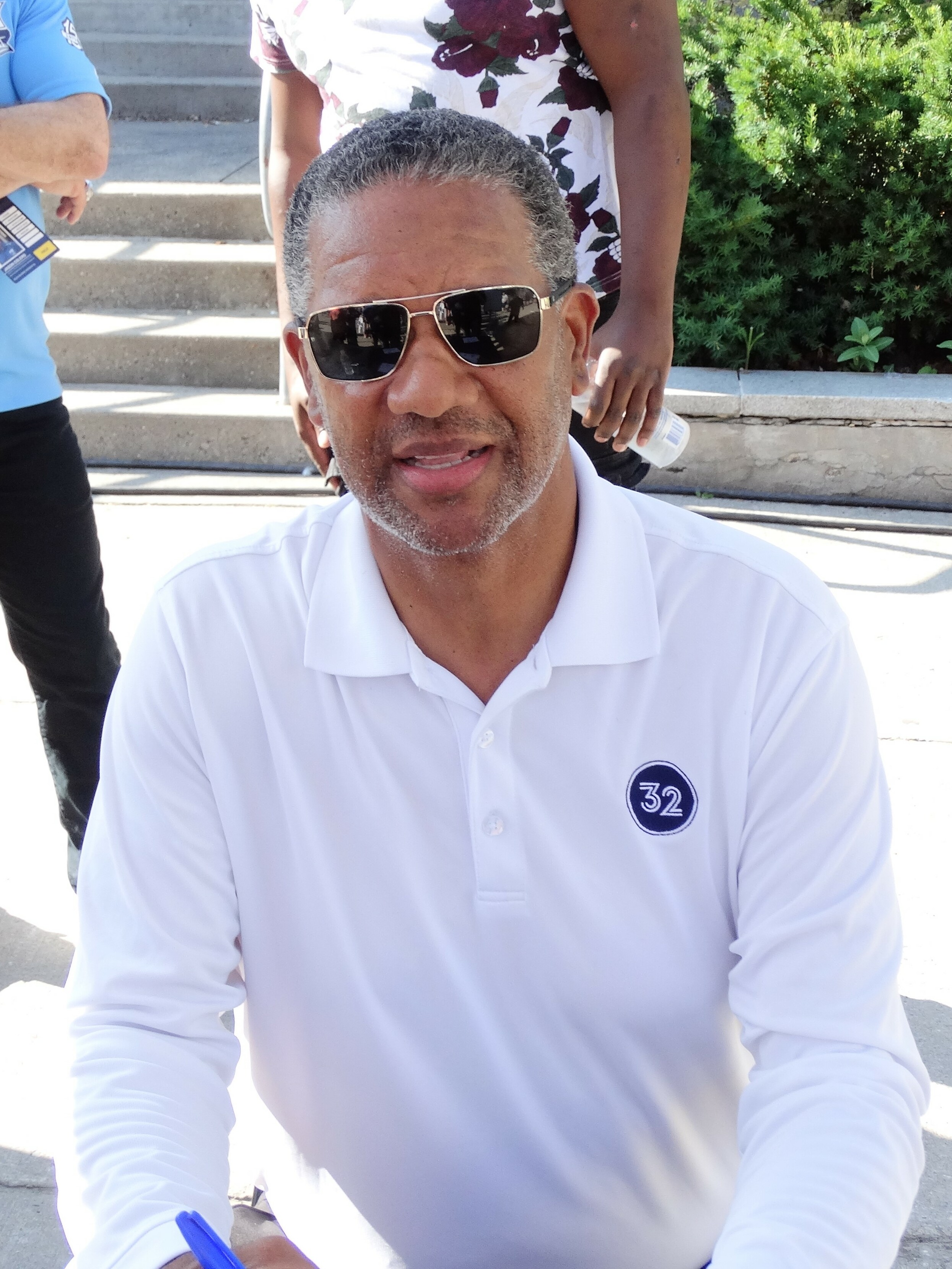
- Allen at a Toronto Argonauts game in 2023

No. 9
- Position: Quarterback

Personal information
- Born: July 29, 1963 (age 63); San Diego, California, U.S.
- Listed height: 6 ft 1 in (1.85 m)
- Listed weight: 180 lb (82 kg)

Career information
- High school: Lincoln (San Diego)
- College: Cal State Fullerton

Career history
- 1985–1988: Edmonton Eskimos
- 1989–1991: Ottawa Rough Riders
- 1992: Hamilton Tiger-Cats
- 1993–1994: Edmonton Eskimos
- 1995: Memphis Mad Dogs
- 1996–2002: BC Lions
- 2003–2007: Toronto Argonauts

Awards and highlights
- 4× Grey Cup champion (1987, 1993, 2000, 2004); 3× Grey Cup MVP (1987, 1993, 2004); CFL's Most Outstanding Player (2005); Terry Evanshen Trophy (2005); Eddie James Memorial Trophy (1993); Rogers Fans' Choice Award (2005); CFL All-Star (2005); 2× CFL East All-Star (2005, 1991); CFL West All-Star (1999)

Career CFL statistics
- Passing comp: 5,158
- Passing att: 9,138
- Passing yards: 72,381
- Passing TDs: 394
- Stats at CFL.ca (archive)
- Canadian Football Hall of Fame (Class of 2012)

Damon L. Allen (born July 29, 1963) is an American former professional football quarterback who played 23 years in the Canadian Football League (CFL). He is currently fourth in all-time professional football passing yards and second in all-time CFL passing yards after he was surpassed for first place by the Montreal Alouettes' Anthony Calvillo on October 10, 2011. Allen retired as professional football's all-time leading passer with 72,381 passing yards after he surpassed Warren Moon's total of 70,553 yards (in both the CFL and NFL combined) on September 4, 2006, in the annual Labour Day Classic. He also retired in third place in all-time CFL rushing yards with 11,920 yards, behind Mike Pringle and George Reed. The 2007 season marked Allen's twenty-third season in the CFL and he officially announced his retirement on May 28, 2008, at age 44. Allen is the younger brother of Pro Football Hall of Famer Marcus Allen.

Allen has been mentioned as one of the greatest CFL quarterbacks of all time. He won four Grey Cups with three different teams, and was the game's most valuable player three times. In 2005, he won the CFL's Most Outstanding Player Award at 42 years old, becoming the second-oldest player in North American professional sports history to be named a league's most valuable player (after ice hockey's Gordie Howe, who was selected most valuable player of the World Hockey Association in 1974 at age 46). He was a formidable passer and rusher, as he retired only 323 rushing yards behind his brother Marcus. In 2012, he was elected into the Canadian Football Hall of Fame.

In May 2010, Allen launched the Damon Allen Quarterback Academy, in which he personally teaches the skills and strategies of quarterbacking to students of all ages and skill levels.

In 2018, Allen was awarded the Order of Sport, marking his induction into Canada's Sports Hall of Fame.

== Early life ==
Allen started playing football by the age of six for Valencia Park's Pop Warner in San Diego. Allen played safety on defense. In the Junior Peewee league, in his first year as a quarterback, Allen's team won the championships. This was followed by two undefeated seasons, and winning the Junior Peewee league title for three consecutive seasons.

In high school, Allen was a fine two sport athlete. In football he was the starting quarterback at Lincoln High School. He had a 22–2 record as starting quarterback at Lincoln High. Allen was a first team all-CIF player and Tribune Athlete of the Year. He led his team to consecutive 2A Division CIF Football Championships. In baseball, Allen was a pitcher with a record of 14–2, and his Lincoln High baseball team was rated #1 in San Diego County with a record of 24–4. He was a First team All-CIF Utility Man which also made him Tribune Athlete of the Year in his senior year.

== College career ==
Damon went on to play college football for California State University, Fullerton, where he became one of the most accomplished quarterbacks in Titans history and broke several records. He led the Titans to their only Pacific Coast Athletic Association championships in 1983 and 1984. In 1984, Allen led Cal State Fullerton to an 11–1 record and finished 16th in the Heisman Trophy voting. He was also named the UPI All-West Coast team quarterback alongside UNLV's Randall Cunningham. Allen also broke a 26-year-old NCAA record by throwing only three interceptions on 330 attempts while passing for 20 touchdowns. He finished his Titans career as the program's leader in total offense with 4,653 yards, while ranking second in passing yards with 4,218 and completions with 322, and among the top five in touchdown passes with 27. Allen also earned an invitation to the Senior Bowl, where he completed six of eight passes for 50 yards and a touchdown and rushed for 20 yards on three carries. In 2009, Allen was inducted into the Cal State Fullerton Athletics Hall of Fame.

Allen was also an accomplished baseball player, pitching for the Cal State Fullerton Titans under College Baseball Hall of Fame coach Augie Garrido. He was on the Titans' roster in 1982 but did not appear in a game. In 1983, he appeared in one game and threw one scoreless inning. In 1984, he appeared in 19 games, including six starts, and recorded a 3–2 record, four saves and a 3.60 ERA in 50 innings, with 29 strikeouts and 32 walks, helping the Titans post a 66–20 record and win the 1984 College World Series. Allen struggled in 1985, going 1–3 with a 9.28 ERA in 13 appearances and 21⅓ innings. In his Cal State Fullerton career, he appeared in 33 games and pitched 72⅔ innings, compiling a 4–5 record, 5.23 ERA, 1.80 WHIP and 42 strikeouts. Allen was selected in the Major League Baseball draft four times. He was first drafted by the Detroit Tigers in the seventh round of the 1984 Major League Baseball draft, the same year the Tigers won the 1984 World Series, followed by a 29th-round selection by the Texas Rangers in the 1985 Major League Baseball draft. In 1986, Allen was selected by the Rangers again, in the second round of the January draft's second phase, and by the Seattle Mariners in the fifth round of the June draft's secondary phase. He did not sign with any of those organizations. Allen later signed with the Pittsburgh Pirates and reported to their 1994 spring training camp. During the 1994 season, at age 30, he appeared in three games for the Salem Buccaneers, then the Pirates' Class A-Advanced affiliate in the Carolina League, allowing eight earned runs in 3⅔ innings with five walks and three strikeouts.

== Professional career ==
=== Edmonton Eskimos (first stint) ===
Allen joined the CFL as a free-agent in 1985, signed by the Edmonton Eskimos, and threw for 661 yards and three touchdowns in his rookie season as a back-up to Matt Dunigan. In the 1987 season, Allen played in the Grey Cup championship game, replacing the injured starter Dunigan, and led the Eskimos to a Grey Cup victory, defeating the Toronto Argonauts 38–36, at Vancouver's BC Place Stadium. His first Grey Cup win, Allen earned Grey Cup Most Valuable Player honours in the championship.

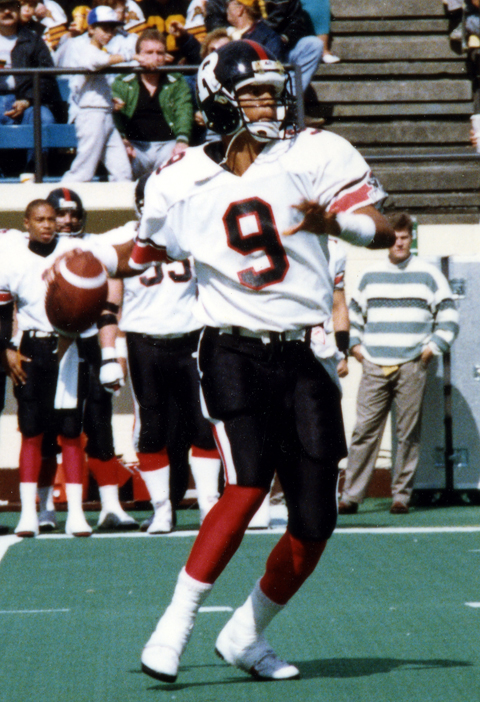
Allen with the Ottawa Rough Riders

=== Ottawa Rough Riders ===
In 1989, Allen signed with the Ottawa Rough Riders. Ottawa missed the playoffs with a 4–14 record.

In 1990, Allen set single season career highs in passing yards (3,883) and touchdowns (34), and rushing yards (776) and touchdowns (7). His contributions helped Ottawa make the playoffs for the first time since the 1985 season. Ottawa lost the East Semi-Final to the host Toronto Argonauts.

In 1991, Allen once again set single season career highs in passing yards (4,275), and rushing yards (1,036) and touchdowns (8). He was named an Eastern Division All-Star for the first time in his CFL career, and helped Ottawa make the playoffs for the second consecutive season. Ottawa lost the East Semi-Final to the host Winnipeg Blue Bombers.

=== Hamilton Tiger-Cats ===
In 1992, Allen signed with the Hamilton Tiger-Cats. In 18 games, Allen threw for 3,858 and 19 touchdowns, and rushed for 850 yards and 7 touchdowns, in his only season in "Steeltown."

=== Edmonton Eskimos (second stint) ===
Prior to the 1993 season, Allen was traded to the Edmonton Eskimos, his second stint with the team. That year, Allen was the winner of the Eddie James Memorial Trophy, awarded to the leading rusher in the West Division, after he gained 920 yards. His yardage total was second in the league only to Winnipeg running back Michael Richardson's 925 yards. Edmonton finished second in the West, defeated Saskatchewan in the West Semi-Final, and defeated Calgary in the West Final. In the West Final, Allen threw 4 touchdown passes in a blizzard. Allen helped the Eskimos to victory in the Grey Cup game, winning his second title, and was named Grey Cup Most Valuable Player in a 33–23 win over the Winnipeg Blue Bombers.

In 1994, Allen led the Esks to the Western Division Semi-Finals, only to lose to the BC Lions.

=== Memphis Mad Dogs ===
In 1995, Allen signed as a free-agent with the Memphis Mad Dogs. He appeared in 15 games with the CFL expansion team, and threw for 3,211 yards and 11 touchdowns on 228 of 390 passing. Allen also rushed for 427 yards in his only professional season in the United States.

=== BC Lions ===
In 1996, Allen joined the BC Lions.

In 1999, BC finished with a league-best 13–5 record. Allen threw for 4,219 yards on 315 of 521 passing with 22 touchdowns, ran the ball 136 times for 785 yards and 8 touchdowns, and threw for more than 300 yards on five occasions. Allen was voted to the CFL's West Division All-Star team. BC hosted Calgary in the West Final. Late in the game, BC trailed by 2 points when Allen fumbled. Calgary recovered, ran out the clock, and advanced to the Grey Cup in BC's stadium.

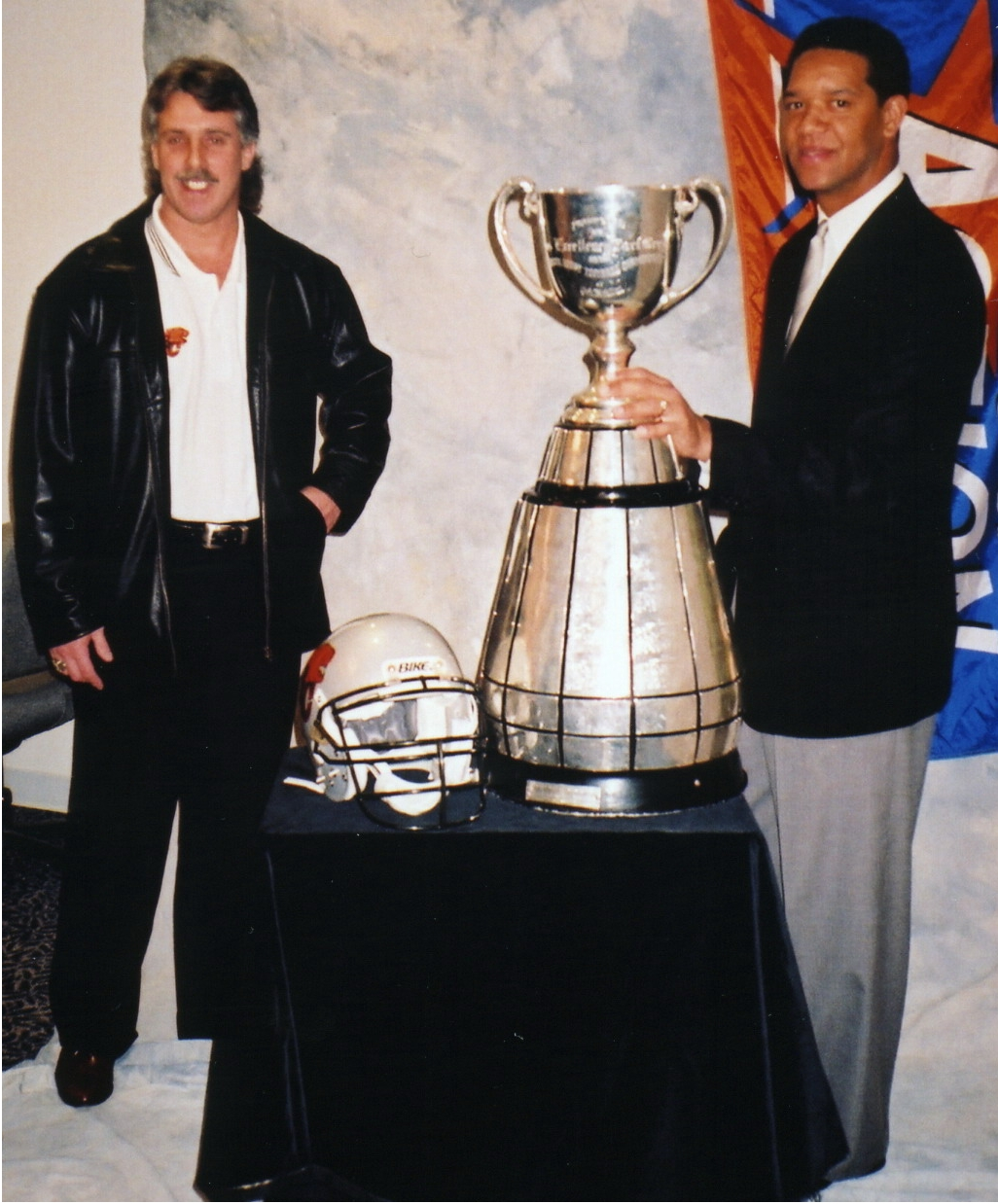
Allen and teammate Lui Passaglia with the Grey Cup in January 2001

In 2000, Allen became the CFL's all-time leading passer on October 28 against Hamilton, throwing for 345 yards to surpass Ron Lancaster's previous record of 50,535 yards. Allen completed 324 of 525 passes (61.7%) to lead the CFL with a career-high 4,840 passing yards. Allen was nominated as the Lions' Most Outstanding Player at the CFL Player Awards. BC defeated Edmonton in the West Semi-Final, and played Calgary in the West Final. BC returned the favour from the year prior by defeating the first-place Stampeders in the West Final when Calgary was hosting the Grey Cup. Allen captured his first Grey Cup with the Lions (third of his career) throwing for 234 yards in a win over the Montreal Alouettes.

=== Toronto Argonauts ===
In 2003, after the acquisition of Dave Dickenson as their new quarterback, the 39-year-old Allen was traded from the BC Lions to the Toronto Argonauts for a second-round draft pick in the 2004 CFL draft, and a third-round pick in the 2005 CFL draft. Allen's Argonaut re-debut was a 20–18 season- opening loss to the Saskatchewan Roughriders that also marked Allen's 300th regular season game of his CFL career. In Week 7, Allen became only the third quarterback in professional football history to pass for 60,000 yards against his former club, the BC Lions. In a Week 17 loss to the Ottawa Renegades, Allen completed 20 of 39 pass attempts for 203 yards, with 2 interceptions and 1 touchdown, giving Allen 334 career touchdown passes, and surpassing Ron Lancaster for the most career touchdown passes in CFL history. Allen would lead the Argos to the Eastern Division Final that year as well.

In Week 9 of the 2004 season versus Montreal, Allen exited the game in the third quarter with a fractured left tibia, and spent Weeks 10–16 on the injured reserve roster. There was considerable concern that Allen, at 41 years of age, would never come back from such a severe injury, but he did. In Week 17, Allen dressed as the third quarterback (behind Michael Bishop and Romaro Miller) for a game against the BC Lions. In Week 18, Allen dressed as the backup quarterback behind Michael Bishop and entered the game versus the Calgary Stampeders at the end of the second quarter. Allen completed his first thirteen pass attempts, making him the second quarterback in Argonaut history (Mike Rae, 17 of 17 versus Montreal, August 12, 1975) to complete more than 12 passes consecutively in a game. Allen finished the game with 18 of 23 pass completions, and his 82.6% completion percentage ranks fourth in Argo history for a single game.

In the 2004 Grey Cup Championship against the BC Lions, Allen was named Grey Cup Most Valuable Player for third time in his legendary career. Allen led the Argos to their fifteenth Grey Cup Championship and won his fourth championship. Allen finished the game with 23 of 34 pass completions for 299 yards (longest gain, 34 yards) and 1 touchdown pass, and rushed 5 times for 10 yards (longest gain, 5 yards) and 2 rushing touchdowns.

Allen continued his assault on the record books during the 2005 CFL season. On October 27, 2005, Damon reached the 5,000-yard passing plateau for the first time in his 21-year CFL career by posting a 34–11 victory against the Hamilton Tiger-Cats. The win guaranteed Toronto a first-place finish in the CFL East plus home field advantage in the playoffs. The game took place before 40,085 fans; the largest crowd for a CFL game in Toronto since 1992. However, the Argonauts were defeated 33–17 in the 2005 East Final by the Montreal Alouettes, thereby thwarting their hopes of repeating their 2004 Grey Cup win.

In 2005, Allen won his first CFL's Outstanding Player Award. In that year, he also hosted the inaugural "Damon Allen Quarterback Challenge" which featured top CFL quarterbacks participating in various skill competitions. In the Quarterback Challenge's second year, Allen won the event.

In 2006, Allen started the opening home game of the season against the Hamilton Tiger-Cats and broke the middle finger on his right hand on Toronto's third play. Allen was injured trying to break his fall after taking a late hit from Hamilton safety Wayne Shaw, who was penalized on the play. Allen missed nearly a month and a half of action with a broken finger, returning on July 29 vs. the BC Lions.

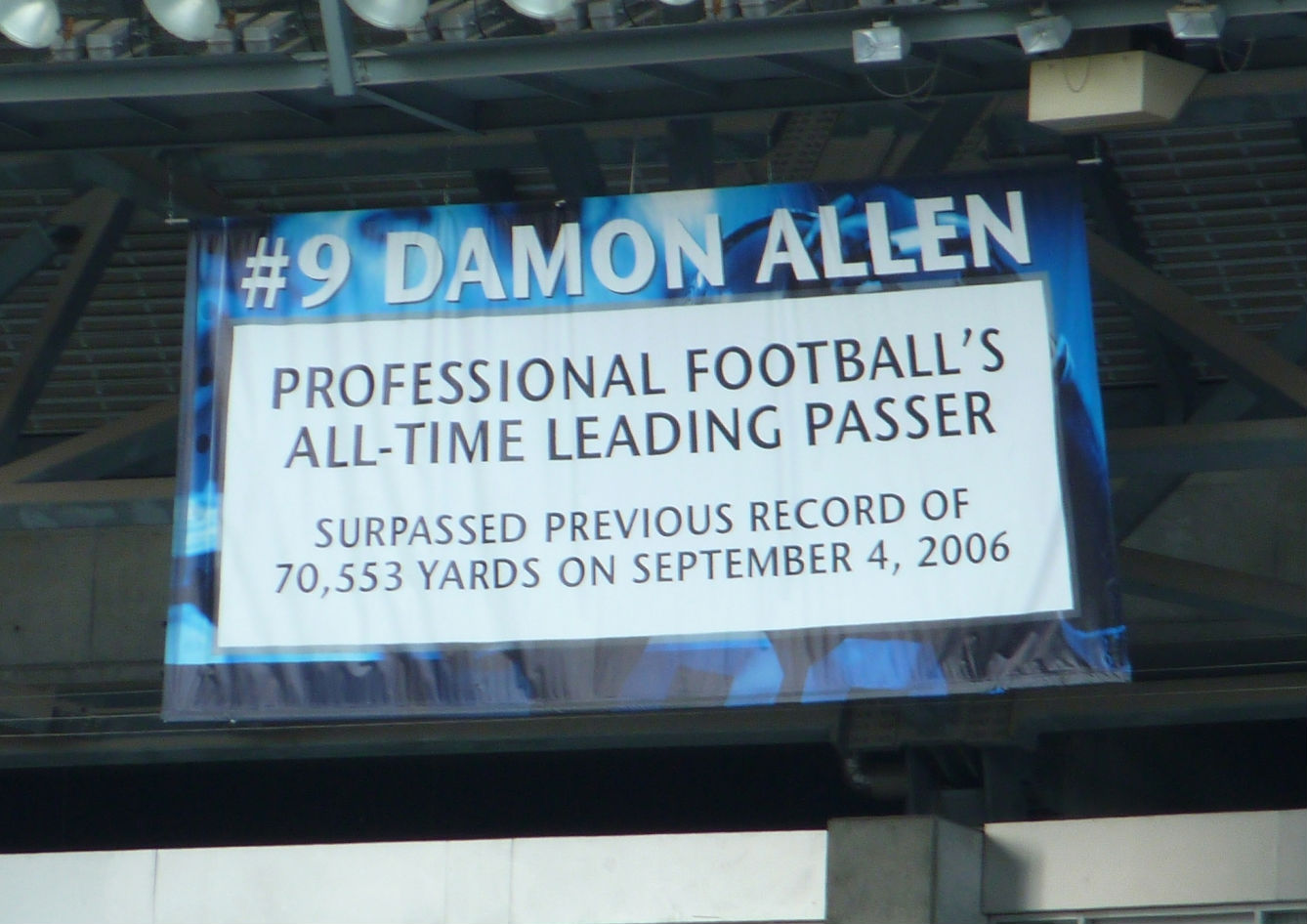
A banner hangs in the Rogers Centre to commemorate Allen breaking the All-Time Pro-Football Passing Record in 2006.

On September 4, 2006, at the Labour Day Classic against the Hamilton Tiger-Cats, Allen broke Warren Moon's record (70,553 yards) to become professional football's all-time passing leader. The record-setting completion, a 29-yard shovel pass to wide receiver Arland Bruce III, took place at 5:02 of the third quarter. The game was suspended briefly for a presentation by CFL Commissioner Tom Wright. Allen's triumphant pose with the record-breaking football was captured by a photographer and later released by the Argos as a commemorative poster on their website.

In November 2006, Allen was voted one of the CFL's Top 50 players (#14) of the league's modern era by Canadian sports network The Sports Network/TSN.

On January 18, 2007, Allen underwent successful surgery to repair the middle finger of his (right) throwing hand and was back in the gym training, in less than 24 hours.

On February 28, 2007, Allen re-signed a contract with the Argonauts for one year plus an option.

Allen started the 2007 season as the Argos starting quarterback beating out Michael Bishop and former NFL starter Mike McMahon. However, he was replaced in the third quarter of the first game by Bishop despite having gone 14–18, 130 yards and a touchdown. Allen was then bumped down to third on the depth chart. However, after Bishop went down with a wrist injury and McMahon failed to impress, Allen stepped into the starting role once again. However, in his first game back as starter he injured his toe. Allen was placed on the nine-game injured list and Rocky Butler took over as the Argos starting quarterback

Allen announced that his retirement as a player on May 28, 2008, but will stay with the Argos as a special advisor to CEO Pinball Clemons.

=== Rankings upon retirement ===
==== Service ====
3rd in career CFL games played (370)

1st in career CFL starts by a quarterback (304)

==== Passing ====
1st in career professional football passing yards

==== Rushing ====
1st in career CFL rushing yards, quarterback (11,920)

3rd in career CFL rushing yards (11,920)

1st in career CFL rushing touchdowns, quarterback (93)

3rd in career CFL rushing touchdowns (93)

== Post-retirement ==
In 2018, Allen was awarded the Order of Sport, marking his induction into Canada's Sports Hall of Fame.

== Career statistics ==
=== CFL ===
		Passing									Rushing
Year	Team	GP	GS	Att	Comp	Pct	Yards	TD	Int	Rating	Att	Yards	Avg	Long	TD	Fumb
1985	EDM	16	2	98	48	49.0	661	3	3	68.5	36	190	5.3	18	5	3
1986	EDM	18	1	87	49	56.3	878	8	3	107.4	31	245	7.9	39	6	2
1987	EDM	18	6	287	150	52.3	2,670	17	13	85.3	66	562	8.5	40	6	8
1988	EDM	10	7	218	94	43.1	1,309	4	12	46.2	33	130	3.9	13	1	5
1989	OTT	13	12	434	209	48.2	3,093	17	16	69.6	75	532	7.1	51	1	7
1990	OTT	17	17	528	276	52.3	3,883	34	23	79.6	124	776	6.3	41	7	9
1991	OTT	18	18	546	282	51.6	4,275	24	31	68.7	129	1,036	8.0	42	8	6
1992	HAM	18	18	523	266	50.9	3,858	19	14	76.2	111	850	7.7	37	7	18
1993	EDM	18	16	400	214	53.5	3,394	25	10	92.4	120	920	7.7	43	6	8
1994	EDM	18	17	493	254	51.5	3,554	19	15	75.2	120	707	5.9	43	7	11
1995	MEM	15	14	390	228	58.5	3,211	11	13	80.6	63	427	6.8	25	0	5
1996	BC	14	13	368	219	59.5	2,772	13	10	83.5	52	400	7.7	31	2	7
1997	BC	18	18	583	378	64.8	4,653	21	11	93.5	111	837	7.5	28	8	9
1998	BC	18	18	479	282	58.9	3,519	16	16	79.0	115	782	6.8	29	2	5
1999	BC	18	18	521	315	60.5	4,219	22	13	89.9	136	785	5.8	30	8	13
2000	BC	18	18	525	324	61.7	4,840	24	11	98.4	58	284	4.9	34	2	7
2001	BC	16	16	471	251	53.3	3,631	18	14	79.0	86	580	6.7	45	2	10
2002	BC	18	18	474	268	56.5	3,987	22	10	90.9	70	479	6.8	22	4	7
2003	TOR	16	15	450	267	59.3	3,395	17	10	86.3	76	507	6.7	26	4	9
2004	TOR	11	9	312	189	60.6	2,438	12	4	92.6	40	212	5.3	32	3	0
2005	TOR	17	17	549	352	64.1	5,082	33	15	102.7	85	467	5.5	26	4	9
2006	TOR	18	14	335	198	59.1	2,567	12	11	81.5	25	197	7.9	22	0	1
2007	TOR	9	2	67	45	67.2	492	3	0	103.6	4	15	3.8	6	0	2
CFL totals		370	304	9,138	5,158	56.4	72,381	394	278	83.8	1,766	11,920	6.7	51	93	161

=== College ===
Year	Team	Games			Passing								Rushing			
Year	Team	GP	GS	Record	Cmp	Att	Pct	Yds	Y/A	TD	Int	Rtg	Att	Yds	Avg	TD
1981	Cal State Fullerton	4	0	—	1	9	11.1	17	1.9	0	0	27.0	11	8	0.7	0
1982	Cal State Fullerton	9	2	1–1	40	90	44.4	435	4.8	3	5	84.9	34	81	2.4	0
1983	Cal State Fullerton	12	12	8–4	103	200	51.5	1,297	6.5	4	3	109.6	118	126	1.1	5
1984	Cal State Fullerton	12	12	11–1	178	330	53.9	2,469	7.5	20	3	135.0	106	220	2.1	5
Career		37	26	20–6	322	629	51.2	4,218	6.7	27	11	118.2	269	435	1.6	10

== Personal life ==
Damon has three daughters and a son. They live in Oakville, Ontario. Damon is employed as special assistant to the GM of the Toronto Argonauts.

== See also ==
- List of gridiron football quarterbacks passing statistics
