= Herman Smith (gridiron football) =

American gridiron football player (born 1971)

Stetson Hatters
- Title: Defensive line coach

Personal information
- Born: January 25, 1971 (age 55); Mound Bayou, Mississippi, U.S.

Career information
- High school: Fort Lauderdale (FL) Dillard
- College: Portland State
- NFL draft: 1994: undrafted

Career history

Playing
- Philadelphia Eagles (1994)*; Hamilton Tiger-Cats (1994); London Monarchs (1995); Tampa Bay Buccaneers (1995–1996); London Monarchs (1997); San Francisco 49ers (1997)*; Dallas Cowboys (1998)*; BC Lions (1998–2003)
- * Offseason or practice squad member only

Coaching
- Victor Valley (2013–2015) Defensive line coach; Oklahoma Baptist (2016) Defensive line coach; CSU Pueblo (2017–2024) Defensive line coach; Stetson (2025–present) Defensive line coach

Awards and highlights
- Grey Cup champion (88th)
- Stats at Pro Football Reference

Herman Smith III (born January 25, 1971) is an American former professional football player who was a defensive end in the Canadian Football League (CFL), National Football League (NFL) and World League of American Football (WLAF). He played college football for Portland State University (PSU) and then professionally for the Hamilton Tiger-Cats and BC Lions of the CFL, London Monarchs of the WLAF and Tampa Bay Buccaneers of the NFL.
