= Mike Crumb =

Canadian football player (born 1970)

No. 37, 6
- Position: Safety

Personal information
- Born: November 24, 1970 (age 55); Kelowna, British Columbia, Canada
- Listed height: 6 ft 0 in (1.83 m)
- Listed weight: 195 lb (88 kg)

Career information
- CJFL: Okanagan Sun

Career history
- 1998–2002: BC Lions
- 2003–2005: Toronto Argonauts

Awards and highlights
- 2× Grey Cup champion (2000, 2004)

Mike Crumb (born November 24, 1970) is a Canadian former professional football safety who played eight seasons in the Canadian Football League, with the BC Lions and Toronto Argonauts. He also played CIS football at the University of Saskatchewan. He won the 88th Grey Cup with the Lions and the 92nd Grey Cup with the Argonauts.

== Early life and university ==
Crumb was born on November 24, 1970, in Kelowna, British Columbia. He played CIS football for the Saskatchewan Huskies of the University of Saskatchewan. He also played for the Okanagan Sun of the Canadian Junior Football League. Crumb was inducted into the Central Okanagan Sports Hall of Fame in 2024.

== Professional career ==
Crumb dressed in 17 games for the BC Lions of the Canadian Football League (CFL) during his rookie year in 1998, recording 11 defensive tackles and 14 special teams tackles. He wore jersey number 37 with the Lions. He dressed in 17 games again in 1999, totaling nine defensive tackles, nine special teams tackles, and a 20-yard reception. He dressed in 15 games during the 2000 season, accumulating 26 defensive tackles, five special teams tackles, one interception, one pass breakup, and one fumble recovery. On November 26, 2000, the Lions beat the Montreal Alouettes in the 88th Grey Cup. Crumb dressed in 16 games in 2001, recording eight defensive tackles, seven special teams tackles, and one interception. He dressed in 14 games during his fifth and final season with the Lions in 2002, totaling 13 defensive tackles, three special teams tackles, and one pass breakup.

Crumb dressed in all 18 games during his first season with the CFL's Toronto Argonauts in 2003, accumulating six defensive tackles and 17 special teams tackles. He wore jersey number 6 with the Argonauts that season. He switched back to number 37 in 2004. He dressed in 15 games with the Argonauts in 2004, registering 11 defensive tackles, 12 special teams tackles, and one forced fumble. On November 21, 2004, the Argonauts won the 92nd Grey Cup against Crumb's former team, the BC Lions. Crumb dressed in 14 games during his final CFL season in 2005, posting one defensive tackle, seven special teams tackles, and one fumble recovery.

== Personal life ==
Crumb is the older brother of former CFL player Jason Crumb.
