= Kelly Lochbaum =

Canadian gridiron football player (born 1973)

Profile
- Position: Linebacker

Personal information
- Born: April 3, 1973 (age 53); White Rock, British Columbia, Canada
- Listed height: 6 ft 2 in (1.88 m)
- Listed weight: 250 lb (113 kg)

Career information
- College: Northern Arizona
- CFL draft: 1997: 6th round, 43rd overall pick

Career history
- 1997–2000: BC Lions
- 2001: Calgary Stampeders
- 2002–2005: BC Lions

Awards and highlights
- 2× Grey Cup champion (2000, 2001)
- Stats at CFL.ca

Kelly Lochbaum (born April 3, 1973) is a former Canadian Football League linebacker for the BC Lions. He is currently a real estate agent in Abbotsford, British Columbia.

== Early life ==
Kelly Lochbaum was born on April 3, 1973, in White Rock, British Columbia. Lochbaum attended W. J. Mouat Secondary School in Abbotsford, and as a senior, in 1991, was named the School's Athlete of the Year. He went on to play for the Abbotsford Air Force of the Canadian Junior Football League before attending Butte College in California, and then transferring to Northern Arizona University.

== Professional career ==
Lochbaum was drafted by the Lions in 1997 and played in 10 games that year, recording 55 tackles and 15 special teams tackles. But for a one-year stint for the Calgary Stampeders in 2001, Lochbaum played for the Lions his entire ten-year career and was considered a stand-out special teams player. He went unsigned, however, as a free agent in 2006.

== Career statistics ==
Defence		Tackles			Fumbles
Year	Team	Tackles	STT	Sacks	No.	Yards	Long	TD
1997	BC	55	7	3	0	0	0	0
1998	BC	25	9	2	1	0	0	0
1999	BC	38	26	0	0	0	0	0
2000	BC	25	23	3	1	0	0	0
2001	CGY	14	21	2	0	0	0	0
2002	BC	24	12	0	0	0	0	0
2003	BC	21	18	0	0	0	0	0
2004	BC	27	18	0	0	0	0	0
2005	BC	12	12	0	0	0	0	0
Career totals		81	138	10	2	0	0	0
