= Marvin Thomas =

American football player (born 1973)

No. 98, 92, 90, 96
- Position: Defensive end

Personal information
- Born: October 19, 1973 (age 53); Bay Minette, Alabama, U.S.
- Listed height: 6 ft 5 in (1.96 m)
- Listed weight: 264 lb (120 kg)

Career information
- High school: Baldwin County (Bay Minette)
- College: Memphis (1992–1996)
- NFL draft: 1997: 7th round, 233rd overall pick

Career history
- Chicago Bears (1997)*; Detroit Lions (1997–1998); Denver Broncos (1998–1999)*; → Barcelona Dragons (1999); BC Lions (1999–2000); Memphis Maniax (2001); Detroit Fury (2001–2002); Ottawa Renegades (2002); Toronto Argonauts (2003–2004)
- * Offseason or practice squad member only

Awards and highlights
- Super Bowl champion (XXXIII); 2× Grey Cup champion (2000, 2004)

Career NFL statistics
- Games played: 4
- Stats at Pro Football Reference
- Stats at CFL.ca
- Stats at ArenaFan.com

Marvin A. Thomas (born October 19, 1973) is an American former professional football defensive end who played for the Detroit Lions of the National Football League (NFL). He played college football for the Memphis Tigers and was selected by the Chicago Bears in the seventh round of the 1997 NFL draft. He also played in the Canadian Football League (CFL), Arena Football League (AFL), XFL, and NFL Europe. He was a member of the Denver Broncos' practice squad when they won Super Bowl XXXIII.

== Early life ==
Thomas was born on October 19, 1973, in Bay Minette, Alabama. He attended Baldwin County High School in Bay Minette.

== College career ==
Thomas played college football for the Memphis Tigers from 1992 to 1996. He redshirted his first year and was a four-year letterman from 1993 to 1996. As a senior Thomas had 63 tackles, 12 for loss and six sacks. He finished his career with 19 sacks.

== Professional career ==
=== Chicago Bears ===
Thomas was selected in the seventh round, with the 233th overall selection, by the Chicago Bears in the 1997 NFL draft. He officially signed with the team on July 10. On August 18, Thomas was waived by the team.

=== Detroit Lions ===
On August 26, 1997, Thomas was signed to the practice squad of the Detroit Lions. On November 24, he was elevated to the active roster, replacing Kerwin Waldroup, who was placed on the injured reserve. In the 1998 season, Thomas played in four games before he was released by the team.

=== Denver Broncos ===
On October 19, 1998, Thomas was signed by the Denver Broncos to the practice squad. He earned a Super Bowl ring as a member of the practice squad after the Broncos won Super Bowl XXXIII. On February 3, 1999, Thomas re-signed with the team. On September 4, he was waived by the Broncos.

=== Barcelona Dragons ===
On February 22, 1999, Thomas was allocated to the Barcelona Dragons of NFL Europe. As a starter, he had 23 tackles, four sacks and one forced fumble.

=== BC Lions ===
On September 21, 1999, the BC Lions of the Canadian Football League (CFL) signed Thomas to the practice roster. On September 30, he was elevated to the active roster and made his first CFL appearance on October 2. Thomas had seven tackles in three games that season.

In the 2000 season, Thomas played and started in 21 games, recording 30 tackles, including four for loss, five sacks, two pass deflections and two forced fumbles as the Lions won the 88th Grey Cup. On December 27, he was released by the team.

=== Memphis Maniax ===
On December 29, 2000, Thomas was signed by the Memphis Maniax of the XFL. In 10 games he made 15 tackles.

=== Detroit Fury ===
Thomas played two season for the Detroit Fury of the Arena Football League (AFL). He had two receptions for 18 yards, one touchdown, 39 tackles, one sack, two pass deflections, six forced fumbles and two fumble recoveries.

=== Ottawa Renegades ===
On August 12, 2002, Thomas was signed by the Ottawa Renegades to the practice roster. He played in six games, registering ten tackles, three sacks and one forced fumble. Thomas was released on October 18.

=== Toronto Argonauts ===
On March 11, 2003, Thomas signed with the Toronto Argonauts. He made 41 tackles, four sacks, two pass deflections and one forced fumble. Thomas won another Grey Cup in 2004 when the Argos defeated the BC Lions. He was released at the end of the season.

== Personal life ==
In 1995, Thomas was branded on both biceps with the Greek letter epsilon, the symbol of Phi Beta Sigma, the fraternity he joined at Memphis State (now the University of Memphis). A clothes hanger to create the brand..
