= David Pol =

Canadian football player (born 1973)

No. 73
- Position: Offensive lineman

Personal information
- Born: August 31, 1973 (age 53); New Westminster, British Columbia, Canada
- Listed height: 6 ft 4 in (1.93 m)
- Listed weight: 300 lb (136 kg)

Career information
- High school: St. Thomas More (Burnaby)
- CJFL: Surrey Rams (1992–1993)
- College: Butte (1994)
- University: UBC (1995–1998)
- CFL draft: 1999: 2nd round, 14th overall pick

Career history
- 1999: BC Lions*
- 2000: Hamilton Tiger-Cats*
- 2000: Toronto Argonauts*
- 2000: BC Lions*
- 2000–2001: Calgary Stampeders
- * Offseason or practice squad member only

Awards and highlights
- Vanier Cup champion (1997)

David Pol (born August 31, 1973) is a Canadian former professional football offensive lineman who played one season with the Calgary Stampeders of the Canadian Football League (CFL). He was selected by the BC Lions in the second round of the 1999 CFL draft after playing CIS football at the University of British Columbia. He was also a member of the BC Lions, Hamilton Tiger-Cats and Toronto Argonauts.

== Amateur career ==
David Pol was born on August 31, 1973, in New Westminster, British Columbia. He attended St. Thomas More Collegiate in Burnaby. He played junior football for the Surrey Rams of the Canadian Junior Football League from 1992 to 1993, helping them advance to the Canadian Bowl in 1992. He then played at Butte College in California. Afterwards, Pol was a member of the UBC Thunderbirds of the University of British Columbia from 1995 to 1998. He helped the Thunderbirds win the 33rd Vanier Cup in 1997.

== Professional career ==
Pol was selected by the BC Lions in the second round, with the 14th overall pick, of the 1999 CFL draft. He signed with the team in May 1999. On June 22, 1999, it was reported that Pol had been waived by the Lions.

Pol signed with the Hamilton Tiger-Cats of the CFL in February 2000. He was released by the Tiger-Cats on June 23, 2000.

He then signed with the CFL's Toronto Argonauts in late June 2000, but was released during final roster cuts on July 1, 2000.

Pol was signed to the Lions' practice roster on September 20, 2000, due to the impending retirement of Scott Hendrickson.

On November 2, 2000, it was reported that Pol had been signed to the Calgary Stampeders' practice roster off of the Lions' practice roster. He became a free agent after the season and re-signed with the Stampeders in January 2001. He competed with Canadians Paul Blenkhorn and Andrew Carter for the Stampeders' sixth offensive line spot. Pol was released on June 27, 2001. However, he was later signed to the Stampeders' active roster on August 29, 2001. Before signing with the Stampeders in August, Pol started working as a personal trainer as he believed his football career was over. He then dressed in eight games for the Stampeders during the 2001 season. He wore jersey number 73 while with the Stampeders.
