= Jason Crumb =

Canadian gridiron football player (born 1973)

No. 10
- Position: Defensive back

Personal information
- Born: April 26, 1973 (age 53); Vancouver, British Columbia, Canada
- Listed height: 6 ft 0 in (1.83 m)
- Listed weight: 185 lb (84 kg)

Career information
- CJFL: Okanagan Sun
- University: Saskatchewan
- CFL draft: 1999: 5th round, 34th overall pick

Career history
- 2000–2005: BC Lions

Awards and highlights
- Grey Cup champion (2000)
- Stats at CFL.ca

Jason Crumb (born April 26, 1973) is a Canadian former professional football defensive back who played six seasons with the BC Lions of the Canadian Football League (CFL). He was selected by the Lions in the fifth round of the 1999 CFL draft. He played CIS football for the Saskatchewan Huskies. He was a member of the Lions team that won the 88th Grey Cup.

== Early life and university ==
Jason Crumb was born on April 26, 1973, in Vancouver, British Columbia. He was a member of the Saskatchewan Huskies football team of the University of Saskatchewan from 1994 to 1998 and won two Vanier Cups. He also played for the Okanagan Sun of the Canadian Junior Football League. Crumb was inducted into the Central Okanagan Sports Hall of Fame in 2024.

== Professional career ==
Crumb was selected by the BC Lions in the fifth round, with the 34th overall pick, of the 1999 CFL draft. He dressed in 17 games as a wide receiver during his rookie CFL season in 2000, catching six passes for 114 yards while also recording nine special teams tackles, one forced fumble, and one fumble recovery. The Lions won the 88th Grey Cup 28–26 against the Montreal Alouettes on November 26, 2000. He moved to cornerback in 2001 and dressed in 13 games, totaling 17 special teams tackles, one interception for 33 yards, one fumble recovery, and one kick return for four yards. Crumb dressed in all 18 games for the Lions in 2002, accumulating four tackles on defense, 14 special teams tackles, one forced fumble, one kick return for three yards, and one punt return for no yards. He only dressed in eight games in 2003 and recorded six tackles on defense, five special teams tackles, one sack, and one kick return for no yards. Crumb dressed in all 18 games again in 2004, starting 13, while totaling a career-high 26 defensive tackles, 21 special teams tackles, one interception, seven pass breakups, one sack, two forced fumbles, one fumble recovery, one lost fumble, and one rushing attempt for negative nine yards. He was listed as a safety/defensive halfback during his final season in 2005 and dressed in 15 games, starting one, while recording nine defensive tackles, four special teams tackles, one interception for 35 yards, and one incomplete pass.

== Personal life ==
Crumb is the younger brother of former CFL player Mike Crumb.
