= Daved Benefield =

American football player (born 1968)

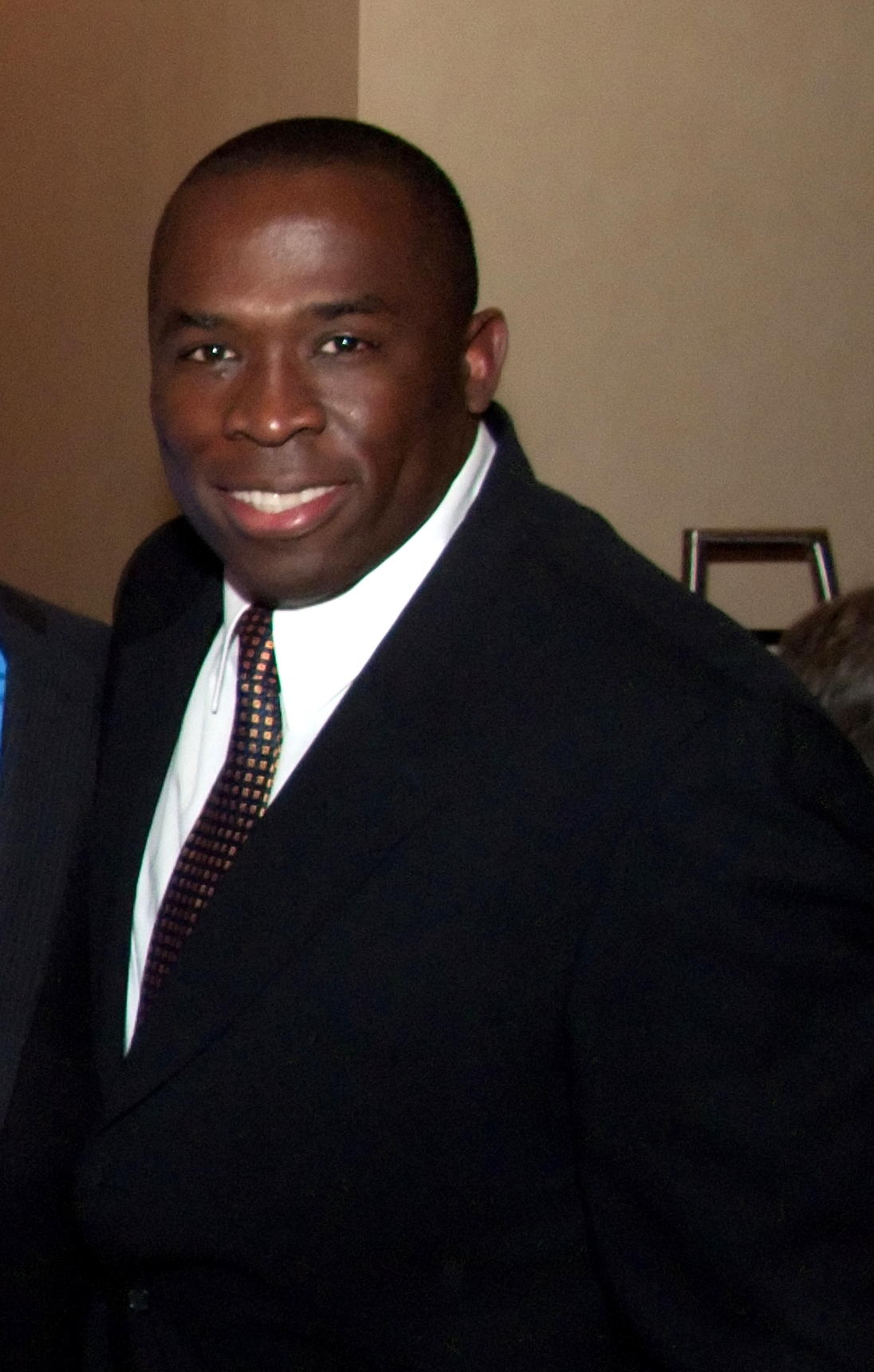
- Benefield in Vancouver in 2009

Profile
- Positions: Linebacker, Defensive end

Personal information
- Born: February 16, 1968 (age 58); Los Angeles, California, U.S.
- Listed height: 6 ft 3 in (1.91 m)
- Listed weight: 245 lb (111 kg)

Career information
- College: Cal State Northridge

Career history
- 1992–1994: Ottawa Rough Riders
- 1995: BC Lions
- 1996: San Francisco 49ers
- 1997–2001: BC Lions
- 2002–2003: Winnipeg Blue Bombers
- 2004–2005: Saskatchewan Roughriders

Awards and highlights
- Grey Cup champion (2000); Norm Fieldgate Trophy (1999); 2× CFL All-Star (1999, 2003); CFL East All-Star (1994); 2× CFL West All-Star (1999, 2003); CFL record: 5 quarterback sacks against the Birmingham Barracudas
- Stats at Pro Football Reference
- Stats at CFL.ca (archive)

Daved Benefield (born February 16, 1968) is an American former professional football player who was a linebacker for 13 seasons in the Canadian Football League (CFL) for five different teams. He also was a backup at linebacker and defensive end for the San Francisco 49ers in 1996. He played college football for the Cal State Northridge Matadors.

== Career ==
As a youngster growing up in Southern California, he surfed at Newport and Zuma north of Los Angeles. He attended California State University, Northridge, where was an All-WFC linebacker, and distinguished himself as the star of the Sigma Alpha Mu intramural national championship team. Benefield was signed by Edmonton as a free agent in Nov. 1990. The Eskimos released him in July 1991, and he signed with the Los Angeles Wings of the Arena Football League in April 1992. He was signed as a free agent by the Canadian Football League's Ottawa Rough Riders in June 1992. Benefield began his CFL career with the Ottawa Rough Riders as an outside linebacker. He became a starting linebacker in 1992 during his rookie season. In his first CFL game on August 19, 1992, Benefield recorded two quarterback sacks, two tackles for losses and seven tackles total, earning player-of-the-game honors. In 1994, he was named a CFL East Division All-Star, with 38 tackles and nine sacks.

In March 1995, Benefield signed as a free agent with the BC Lions, where Dave Ritchie, who served as defensive coordinator for the Rough Riders during Benefield's rookie season had become head coach. The deal was a two-year contract, reportedly for a $10,000 raise over his 1994 salary of $55,000. In 1995, Benefield tied a CFL record with five sacks in a game against the Birmingham Barracudas.

In April 1996, Benefield signed with the San Francisco 49ers of the National Football League. He impressed the 49ers early on in pre-season games, with excellent coverage on special teams. He was also a nickel defensive end on passing downs.

In 1997, when Benefield returned to the CFL, there was a bidding war for his services between several teams. He eventually returned to the BC Lions.

== Personal life ==
Benefield's son Ty Benefield plays as a safety at LSU.
