= Rob Meier =

Canadian gridiron football player (born 1977)

No. 92
- Position: Defensive tackle

Personal information
- Born: August 29, 1977 (age 49); Vancouver, British Columbia, Canada
- Listed height: 6 ft 5 in (1.96 m)
- Listed weight: 308 lb (140 kg)

Career information
- High school: West Vancouver (BC) Sentinel
- College: Washington State
- NFL draft: 2000: 7th round, 241st overall pick
- CFL draft: 1999: 1st round, 1st overall pick

Career history
- Jacksonville Jaguars (2000–2009)

Career NFL statistics
- Total tackles: 232
- Sacks: 21.5
- Forced fumbles: 3
- Fumble recoveries: 3
- Pass deflections: 4
- Stats at Pro Football Reference

Robert Jack Daniel Meier (born August 29, 1977) is a Canadian former professional football player who was a defensive tackle in the National Football League (NFL). He was selected by the Jacksonville Jaguars in the seventh round of the 2000 NFL draft. He played college football for the Washington State Cougars.

== Early life ==
Meier attended Sentinel Secondary School in British Columbia, Canada and was a letterman in football, basketball, and rugby. In football, as a senior, he was named the team's Offensive MVP, and was also an All-Provincial League selection. Meier graduated from Sentinel Secondary School in 1995.

== College career ==
At Washington State University, Meier started 25 games (including the last 23) in four seasons, never missing a game, and played both defensive end and defensive tackle, making 133 career tackles.

== Professional career ==
Meier was selected by the Jacksonville Jaguars in the seventh round of the 2000 NFL draft. On May 15, 2008, he signed a 5-year contract extension to remain with the Jaguars. He was released on February 11, 2010.

== NFL career statistics ==
Legend
**Bold**	Career high

=== Regular season ===
Year	Team	Games		Tackles					Interceptions					Fumbles			
Year	Team	GP	GS	Cmb	Solo	Ast	Sck	TFL	Int	Yds	TD	Lng	PD	FF	FR	Yds	TD
2000	JAX	16	0	17	14	3	0.5	3	0	0	0	0	0	0	0	0	0
2001	JAX	16	0	24	20	4	0.0	1	0	0	0	0	0	0	0	0	0
2002	JAX	16	7	23	20	3	2.0	5	0	0	0	0	0	**1**	0	0	0
2003	JAX	16	0	25	20	5	1.5	5	0	0	0	0	**2**	**1**	**1**	0	0
2004	JAX	11	8	22	15	7	0.5	5	0	0	0	0	1	0	0	0	0
2005	JAX	16	2	**35**	**29**	6	**6.0**	**9**	0	0	0	0	0	**1**	**1**	0	0
2006	JAX	16	8	29	24	5	5.0	7	0	0	0	0	0	0	**1**	0	0
2007	JAX	16	9	27	19	**8**	4.0	7	0	0	0	0	1	0	0	0	0
2008	JAX	15	15	30	26	4	2.0	6	0	0	0	0	0	0	0	0	0
		138	49	232	187	45	21.5	48	0	0	0	0	4	3	3	0	0

=== Playoffs ===
Year	Team	Games		Tackles					Interceptions					Fumbles			
Year	Team	GP	GS	Cmb	Solo	Ast	Sck	TFL	Int	Yds	TD	Lng	PD	FF	FR	Yds	TD
2005	JAX	1	0	2	**2**	0	**1.0**	1	0	0	0	0	0	0	0	0	0
2007	JAX	2	2	**3**	**2**	**1**	**1.0**	**2**	0	0	0	0	0	0	0	0	0
		3	2	5	4	1	2.0	3	0	0	0	0	0	0	0	0	0
