= Jason Kralt =

Canadian football player (born 1974)

No. 49, 99, 6
- Position: Linebacker

Personal information
- Born: February 8, 1974 (age 52); Ottawa, Ontario, Canada
- Listed height: 6 ft 1 in (1.85 m)
- Listed weight: 228 lb (103 kg)

Career information
- High school: Nepean (Ottawa)
- University: Carleton
- CFL draft: 1999: 3rd round, 19th overall pick

Career history
- 1999–2001: BC Lions
- 2002–2005: Ottawa Renegades

Awards and highlights
- Grey Cup champion (2000)

Jason Kralt (born February 8, 1974) is a Canadian former professional football linebacker who played seven seasons in the Canadian Football League (CFL) with the BC Lions and Ottawa Renegades. He was selected by the Lions in the third round of the 1999 CFL draft after playing CIAU football at Carleton University.

== Early life ==
Jason Kralt was born on February 8, 1974, in Ottawa, Ontario. He attended Nepean High School in Ottawa.

Kralt played CIAU football for the Carleton Ravens of Carleton University, with his final year being in 1998. He was a four-year starter for the Ravens. He earned All-Conference honors twice and All-Canadian honors once.

== Professional career ==
Kralt was selected by the BC Lions in the third round, with the 19th overall pick, of the 1999 CFL draft. He dressed in all 54 games for the Lions from 1999 to 2001. On November 26, 2000, the Lions beat the Montreal Alouettes in the 88th Grey Cup by a score of 28–26. However, Kralt did not play in the Grey Cup due to having broken three bones in his foot in the Western Division final. He became a free agent after the 2001 season.

Kralt signed with the Ottawa Renegades of the CFL on February 25, 2002. He dressed in 67 of 72 games for the Renegades from 2002 to 2005. In an interview after the 2005 season, Kralt said he was considering moving into the military full-time and that the 2006 CFL season would likely be his last. On April 9, 2006, the Renegades suspended operations. Kralt finished his CFL career with totals of 121 games dressed, 121 defensive tackles, 71 special teams tackles, one sack, one interception, one forced fumble, and two pass breakups.

== Personal life ==
Kralt joined the Canadian Armed Forces in 1990 and later served as a peacekeeper in Croatia. He continued to serve in the Armed Forces during the CFL offseasons and was promoted to sergeant in 2001.
