= Greg Bearman =

Canadian football player

Greg "Ace" Bearman
Profile
- Position: Safety

Personal information
- Born: August 2, 1975 (age 51); Richmond, British Columbia
- Listed height: 5 ft 7 in (1.70 m)
- Listed weight: 180 lb (82 kg)

Career information
- College: New Mexico State

Career history
- 1999–2000: BC Lions
- 2003–2005: Ottawa Renegades
- 2006–2008: Winnipeg Blue Bombers
- Stats at CFL.ca (archive)

Greg Bearman (born August 2, 1975) is a Canadian former professional football defensive back. In the 2006 CFL season, he was selected 25th overall by the Hamilton Tiger-Cats in the Renegades' dispersal draft. but signed as a free-agent with the Blue Bombers on July 11.
