= Alfred Jackson (gridiron football, born 1967) =

American gridiron football player (born 1967)

No. 31, 41, 25, 7, 5
- Positions: Cornerback, Wide receiver

Personal information
- Born: July 10, 1967 (age 59); Tulare, California, U.S.

Career information
- High school: Tulare Western
- College: San Diego State
- NFL draft: 1989: 5th round, 135th overall pick

Career history
- 1989–1990: Los Angeles Rams
- 1991–1992: Cleveland Browns
- 1993–1994: Winnipeg Blue Bombers
- 1995–1996: Minnesota Vikings
- 1997–2002: British Columbia Lions
- 2003: Toronto Argonauts

Awards and highlights
- Grey Cup champion (2000); CFL All-Star (1997); 2× CFL West All-Star (1997, 2000)
- Stats at Pro Football Reference

Alfred Melvin Jackson Jr. (born July 7, 1967) is an American former professional football player who was a cornerback in the National Football League (NFL) for six seasons and a wide receiver in the Canadian Football League (CFL) for nine seasons. He was selected by the Los Angeles Rams in the fifth round of the 1989 NFL draft with the 135th overall pick.
