= Bo Lewis =

Canadian gridiron football player (born 1974)

Derrick Bo Lewis (born November 15, 1974) is a former Canadian football defensive back in the Canadian Football League who played for the BC Lions and Toronto Argonauts. He played college football for the Jackson State Tigers.
