= Lui Passaglia =

Canadian gridiron football player (born 1954)

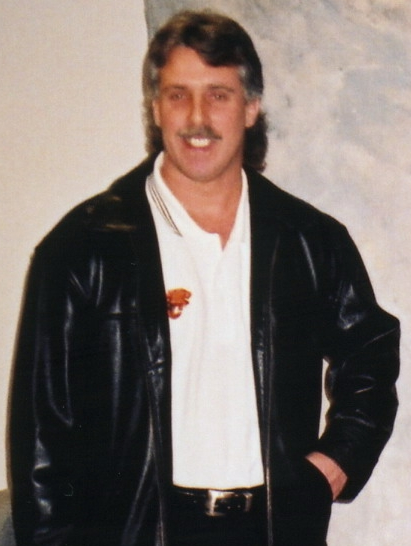
- Passaglia in 2001

No. 5
- Positions: Placekicker, punter, wide receiver

Personal information
- Born: June 7, 1954 (age 72); Vancouver, British Columbia, Canada

Career information
- High school: Notre Dame
- University: Simon Fraser
- CFL draft: 1976: 1st round, 5th overall pick

Career history

Playing
- 1976–2000: BC Lions

Director of Community Relations
- 2001–2007: BC Lions

Awards and highlights
- 3× Grey Cup champion (1985, 1994, 2000); 2× Dick Suderman Trophy (1985, 1994); 4× Dave Dryburgh Memorial Trophy (1983, 1984, 1987, 1998); 4× CFL All-Star (1979, 1983, 1984, 2000); 9× CFL West All-Star (1977, 1979, 1980, 1983, 1984, 1992, 1998, 1999, 2000); BC Sports Hall of Fame; BC Lions Wall of Fame; BC Lions #5 retired

Career CFL statistics
- Games played: 408
- Field goals made: 875
- Field goals attempted: 1,203
- Field goal %: 72.7
- Points scored: 3,991
- Longest field goal: 54
- Canadian Football Hall of Fame (Class of 2004)

Lui Passaglia (born June 7, 1954) is a Canadian former professional football player. He was the placekicker/punter for the BC Lions of the Canadian Football League (CFL) for a record-breaking 25 years from 1976 to 2000, and scored more points in that time than any professional gridiron football player in history. He is a member of Canada's Sports Hall of Fame, the Canadian Football Hall of Fame, the British Columbia Sports Hall of Fame, and the BC Lions Wall of Fame. Passaglia's #5 jersey is one of eleven numbers retired by the Lions. In 2003, Passaglia was voted a member of the BC Lions All-Time Dream Team as part of the club's 50 year anniversary celebration. In 2006, Passaglia was voted one of the CFL's Top 50 players (#30) of the league's modern era by Canadian sports network TSN.

== Early life and amateur career ==
After playing quarterback at Notre Dame Regional Secondary School in East Vancouver, Passaglia, not straying far from home, accepted an athletic scholarship to local Simon Fraser University in suburban Burnaby, British Columbia. At Simon Fraser, Passaglia played wide receiver as well as kicker/punter. As a member of the Clan, Passaglia recorded 175 career points, won All NAIA District 1 honours twice, and was named an All-Northwest All-Star. Passaglia was the fifth-overall selection of the BC Lions in the 1976 CFL season Canadian College Draft, as a kicker and wide receiver.

== Professional career ==
Passaglia caught a 10-yard touchdown pass in his first CFL game on July 22, of the 1976 CFL season against the Saskatchewan Roughriders. His only other career touchdown came on a one-yard run in his final home game at BC Place Stadium, on November 4, of the 2000 season, again against the Roughriders. Between those two touchdown "bookends," Passaglia arguably became one of the most consistent performers in Lions', CFL, and professional football history.

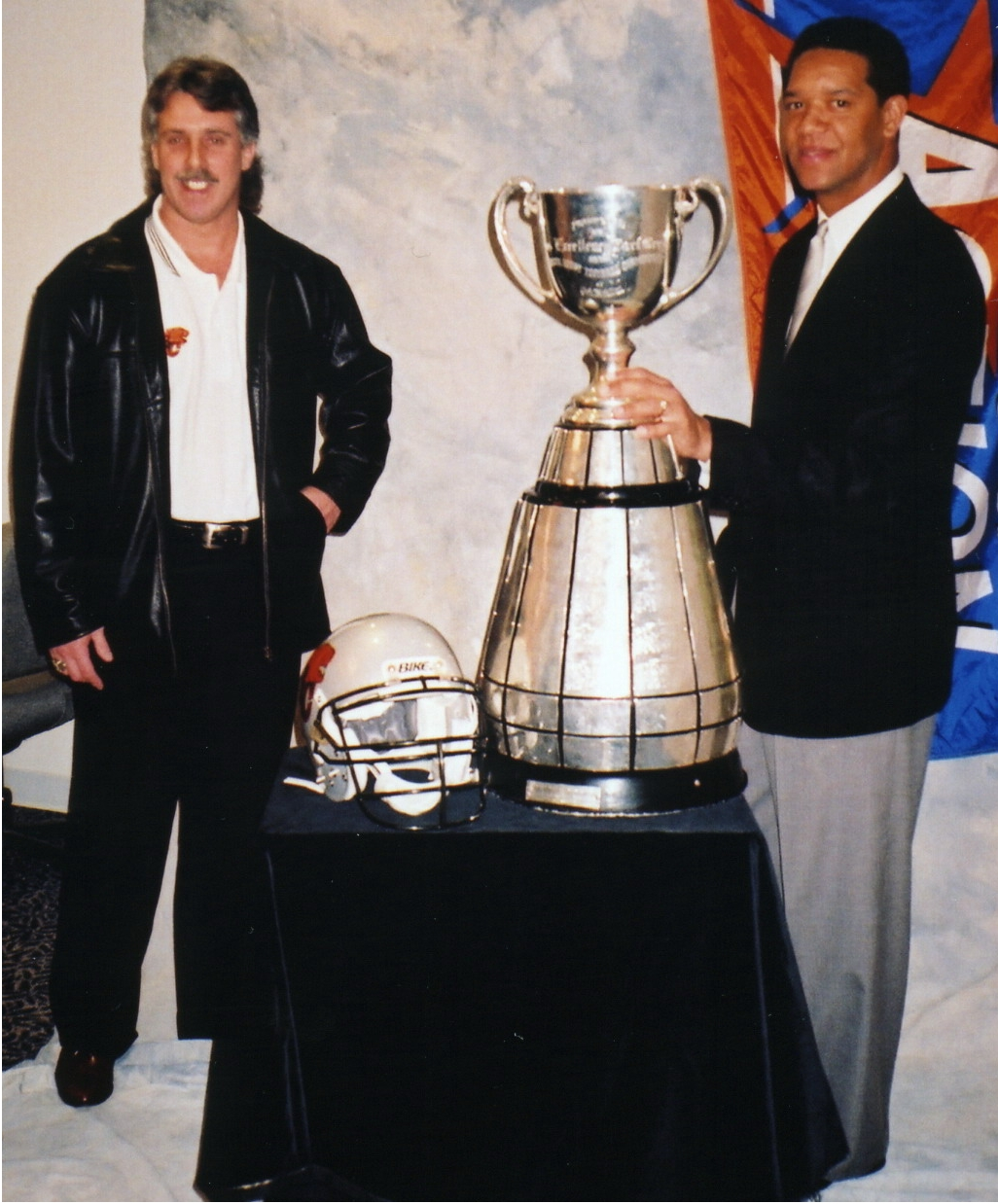
Lui Passaglia and teammate Damon Allen with the Grey Cup in January 2001

Passaglia played the most CFL regular seasons at 25, the most CFL regular season games at 408, and scored the most points in regular season play with 3,991 points, all with one team: the BC Lions. Passaglia was the first player to score 200 points in a season (1987), with 214 points.

Passaglia holds (or held) many CFL regular season records at the time of his retirement including total points scored (3,991), most converts at 1,045 (560 consecutive—he missed only three), most field goals at 875 (of 1,203 attempted), best single season field goal percentage at 90.9% (40 of 44 in 2000, his final year of play), and most single points at 309. Passaglia is the second all-time CFL punt leader with 3,142 for 133,826 yards (behind Bob Cameron), with the second highest average in a season (1983 CFL season) of 50.2 yards (Jon Ryan had a higher average in the 2005 season). The record he held for single-season field goal percentage has since been surpassed at least twice in the time since his retirement, with Paul McCallum originally breaking the record in 2011 and Rene Paredes coming a close second in 2012. In CFL playoff games, Passaglia holds records for most points with 210, is tied for most field goals with 48, and has the longest recorded punt of 89 yards.

As a Lion, Passaglia was named a CFL Western Division All-Star nine times, and was a CFL All-Star four times (1979, 1983, 1984, and 2000 seasons). Passaglia was a member of three of the Lions' Grey Cup seasons (1985, 1994, and 2000 seasons), winning the Dick Suderman Trophy as the Grey Cup's Most Valuable Canadian twice (73rd Grey Cup and 82nd Grey Cup). Passaglia is the longest-playing Lion in team history, appearing in a total of 408 games, overtaking Leos' great Al Wilson's previous mark of 233 games.

Passaglia retired from the CFL following the Lions' 28–26 88th Grey Cup victory over the Montreal Alouettes in the 2000 season, where he kicked the winning points in the game. In the 2003 season, Passaglia was voted a member of the BC Lions All-Time Dream Team, at the kicker and punter positions, as part of the club's 50 year anniversary celebration. In November 2006, Passaglia was voted #30 of the CFL's top 50 players of the league's modern era by Canadian sports network TSN.

Passaglia's last-second field goal in 1994's 82nd Grey Cup game at BC Place, which clinched the championship for the Lions over the Baltimore Football Club, was named the greatest play in BC Lions history in 2007.

By the time of his retirement, Passaglia had been a member of the Lions for over half of its then-47-season history. Consistently a fan favorite, home crowds consistently chanted his given name in a long drawn-out manner (such that it sounded like an extended "Loo...") whenever he came on the field, particularly when attempting crucial field goals.

=== CFL statistics ===
Season	FGM	FGA	FG %	Long
1976	28	49	57.1%	50
1977	40	53	75.5%	48
1978	37	44	84.1%	50
1979	32	45	71.1%	50
1980	31	46	67.4%	54
1981	27	40	67.5%	45
1982	26	35	74.3%	48
1983	43	59	72.9%	52
1984	35	48	72.9%	54
1985	37	55	67.3%	54
1986	39	56	69.6%	49
1987	52	66	78.8%	49
1988	13	20	65.0%	46
1989	37	51	72.5%	53
1990	25	39	64.1%	50
1991	44	59	74.6%	54
1992	28	38	73.7%	49
1993	25	47	74.5%	52
1994	28	36	77.8%	46
1995	45	62	72.6%	49
1996	36	53	67.9%	50
1997	35	45	77.8%	50
1998	36	46	78.8%	51
1999	30	47	63.8%	47
2000	40	44	90.9%	49

== Post-playing career ==
Following his years playing with the Lions, Passaglia worked for seven years as the Lions director of community relations. He resigned from the Lions at the conclusion of the 2007 CFL season to devote his time to his family property development business. Passaglia was replaced as BC Lions director of community relations by fellow Lions great and former teammate, Jamie Taras.

Passaglia has lived in the city of Coquitlam for over 20 years.

In 2006, Simon Fraser University granted him an honorary degree and he delivered a convocation address.

In 2014, Passaglia revealed that he was receiving chemotherapy for stage 3 colon cancer. By going public, he intended to fundraise for research and treatment.
