= Robert Drummond (gridiron football) =

American gridiron football player (born 1967)

No. 36
- Position: Running back

Personal information
- Born: June 21, 1967 (age 59); Syracuse, NY, U.S.
- Listed height: 6 ft 1 in (1.85 m)
- Listed weight: 205 lb (93 kg)

Career information
- High school: Jamesville-DeWitt (DeWitt, New York)
- College: Syracuse
- NFL draft: 1989: 3rd round, 76th overall pick

Career history
- 1989–1991: Philadelphia Eagles
- 1992: Pittsburgh Steelers*
- 1993: Denver Broncos*
- 1994–1995: Baltimore Stallions
- 1996–1997: Toronto Argonauts
- 1998–2001: BC Lions
- 2002: Toronto Argonauts
- * Offseason or practice squad member only

Awards and highlights
- 4× Grey Cup champion (1995, 1996, 1997, 2000); Grey Cup MVP (2000); 2× CFL All-Star (1996, 1997); 2× CFL East All-Star (1996, 1997); CFL West All-Star (1999)
- Stats at Pro Football Reference

Robert C. Drummond (born June 21, 1967) is an American former professional football player who was a running back in the National Football League (NFL) and Canadian Football League (CFL). He played for the Philadelphia Eagles of the NFL between 1989 and 1991 before playing in the CFL from 1994 to 2002. Drummond won four Grey Cups in 1995, 1996, 1997, and 2000. He was selected by the Eagles in the third round of the 1989 NFL draft.
