= 88th Grey Cup =

2000 Canadian Football championship game

BC Lions	Montreal Alouettes
(8–10)	(12–6)
28	26
Head coach: Steve Buratto	Head coach: Charlie Taaffe
	1	2	3	4	Total
BC Lions	8	4	0	16	28
Montreal Alouettes	3	0	7	16	26
- Date: November 26, 2000
- Stadium: McMahon Stadium
- Location: Calgary
- Most Valuable Player: Robert Drummond, RB (Lions)
- Most Valuable Canadian: Sean Millington, RB (Lions)
- Halftime show: The Guess Who
- Attendance: 43,822

Broadcasters
- Network: CBC, RDS
- Announcers: (CBC) Steve Armitage, Chris Cuthbert, Mark Lee, Chris Walby, Brian Williams, Glen Suitor, Scott Russell

The 88th Grey Cup (Canadian Football League championship) was held in 2000 in Calgary. The BC Lions won the game 28–26 over the Montreal Alouettes. The Lions, who finished 8–10 with an overtime loss during the regular season, became the first team ever to finish with a regular season record below .500 and win the Grey Cup.

== Game summary ==
BC Lions (28) – TD's, Damon Allen (2), Robert Drummond; FG's, Lui Passaglia (2); cons., Passaglia (2); singles, Passaglia (2).

Montreal Alouettes (26) – TD's, Jock Climie, Mike Pringle, Ben Cahoon; FG's, Terry Baker (2); cons., Baker (2).

First quarter
BC—Single Passaglia missed 47-yard field goal attempt, one-point granted 4:10
BC—TD Allen 1-yard run (Passaglia convert) 6:39
MTL—FG Baker 19-yard field-goal 11:38
Second quarter
BC—Single Passaglia missed 33-yard field goal attempt, one-point granted 0:17
BC—FG Passaglia 23-yard field-goal 11:10
Third quarter
MTL—TD Climie pass from Calvillo on one-yard line (Baker convert) 6:49
Fourth quarter
BC—TD Drummond 44-yard run (Passaglia convert) 0:55
MTL—FG Baker 51-yard field-goal 4:30
BC—TD Allen 1-yard run 8:38
MTL—TD Pringle 5-yard run (Baker convert) 11:18
BC—FG Passaglia 29-yard field-goal 13:35
MTL—TD Cahoon 59-yard pass from Calvillo 14:16

The game started off slowly. There was no score until Lui Passaglia's missed field goal produced a single for the Lions that got them off to a 1–0 lead. A little more than three minutes later, Damon Allen scored a touchdown on a one-yard run that made the score 8–0. Montreal finally got on the scoreboard at 11:38 when Terry Baker hit a nineteen-yard field goal to cut the score to 8–3. There was only one score in the second quarter, as Passaglia missed another field goal that produced another single for the Lions. The Lions led 12–3 going into the half.

In the third quarter, the Alouettes cut the score to 12–10 after slotback Jock Climie caught a one-yard pass from Anthony Calvillo.

Only 55 seconds into the fourth quarter, Robert Drummond broke through the Al's defense for a forty-four yard score to increase the Lions' lead to 19–10. Terry Baker had his second field goal of the day to bring the Al's nearer, 19–13. Lions' quarterback Damon Allen ran for his second touchdown of the day. The two-point conversion failed, but the lead was now twelve with 11:01 on the clock.

Alouettes running back Mike Pringle, who ran for 115 yards on the day, ran in a five-yard score to shrink the score once again to 25–20 with 3:42 left in the game. Lui Passaglia's 29-yard field goal with 1:25 left gave the Lions an eight-point lead. Anthony Calvillo and the Al's only had a small amount of time to work with to possibly tie up the game and send it into overtime. Calvillo hit receiver Ben Cahoon across the middle and Cahoon raced fifty-nine yards to pull the Alouettes to within two with 44 seconds left in the game. The Alouettes went for a two-point convert to tie the game and send it into overtime, but Calvillo's pass sailed over the head of a falling Thomas Haskins, who fell to the turf before the pass arrived. The play was not without controversy, with the Alouettes seeking a pass interference call, but none was called.

Montreal attempted an onside kick, but Lions' receiver Alfred Jackson leapt over several Alouette players to recover the football, enabling the Lions to run out the clock.

== Trivia ==
- Lions Sean Millington received the game's most valuable Canadian.
- Lions running back Robert Drummond posted 122 rushing yards on 10 carries and was named the game's Most Valuable Player.
- This was the final game for Lions kicker Lui Passaglia who retired after the 2000 CFL season. He played in professional football for 25 years, the longest of any player in the CFL.
- This was the first Grey Cup appearance for the reactivated Montreal Alouettes; their last Grey Cup appearance came in 1979, in a loss to the Edmonton Eskimos.
- The Lions became the first team in history to win the Grey Cup after posting a losing record in the regular season.

== 2000 CFL Playoffs ==
=== West Division ===
Semi-final (November 12 @ Edmonton, Alberta) BC Lions 34-32 Edmonton Eskimos

Final (November 19 @ Calgary, Alberta) BC Lions 37-23 Calgary Stampeders

=== East Division ===
Semi-final (November 12 @ Hamilton, Ontario) Winnipeg Blue Bombers 22-20 Hamilton Tiger-Cats

Final (November 19 @ Montreal, Quebec) Montreal Alouettes 35-24 Winnipeg Blue Bombers
