= Hamilton Tiger-Cats all-time records and statistics =

The following is a list of Hamilton Tiger-Cats all time records and statistics for players current to the 2026 CFL season. This list includes all seasons since the Hamilton Tiger-Cats' inception in 1950 and does not include lineage figures from the Hamilton Tigers nor the Hamilton Wildcats. Each category lists the top six players, where known, except for when the sixth place player is tied in which case all players with the same number are listed. Aside from Grey Cup championship games played and won, this list includes only regular season statistics.

For records by head coaches, see List of Hamilton Tiger-Cats head coaches.

== Grey Cup championships ==
Grey Cup games won

- 4 – Angelo Mosca, Tommy Grant, John Barrow, Chet Miksza, Garney Henley, Bob Krouse
- 3 – Pete Neumann, Zeno Karcz, Bill Danychuk, Joe Zuger, Gene Ceppetelli, Ellison Kelly, Hal Patterson

Grey Cup games played in

- 9 – John Barrow, Tommy Grant
- 8 – Angelo Mosca, Chet Miksza
- 7 – Pete Neumann, Garney Henley, Ralph Goldston, Zeno Karcz, Geno DeNobile

== Tenure ==
Most games played

- 296 – Paul Osbaldiston – (1986-2003)
- 216 – Garney Henley – (1960-75)
- 204 – Rocky DiPietro – (1978-91)
- 200 – Rob Hitchcock – (1995-2006)
- 192 – John Barrow – (1957-70)
- 184 – Pete Newmann – (1951-64)

Most seasons played

- 18 – Paul Osbaldiston – (1986-2003)
- 16 – Garney Henley – (1960-75)
- 15 – Chet Miksza – (1952-65, 68)
- 14 – Pete Newmann – (1951-64)
- 14 – John Barrow – (1957-70)
- 14 – Rocky DiPietro – (1978-91)

== Scoring ==
Most points – career

- 2,856 – Paul Osbaldiston – (1986-2003)
- 1,069 – Bernie Ruoff – (1980-87)
- 603 – Tommy Joe Coffey – (1967-72)
- 561 – Justin Medlock – (2011, 2014-15)
- 522 – Earl Winfield – (1987-97)
- 476 – Nick Setta – (2007-09)

Most points – season

- 233 – Paul Osbaldiston – 1989
- 212 – Paul Osbaldiston – 1990
- 203 – Paul Osbaldiston – 1999
- 203 – Marc Liegghio – 2025
- 197 – Justin Medlock – 2011
- 196 – Paul Osbaldiston – 1992

Most points – game

- 26 – Terry Evanshen – versus Ottawa Rough Riders, September 7, 1975
- 24 – Garney Henley – versus Saskatchewan Roughriders, October 15, 1962
- 24 – Kalin Hall – versus BC Lions, October 15, 1995
- 24 – Paul Osbaldiston – versus Ottawa Rough Riders, September 22, 1996
- 24 – Tony Akins – versus Winnipeg Blue Bombers, October 10, 1999
- 24 – Justin Medlock – versus BC Lions, October 22, 2011

Most touchdowns – career

- 87 – Earl Winfield – (1987-97)
- 62 – Brandon Banks – (2013-19, 2021)
- 56 – Garney Henley – (1960-75)
- 54 – Tommy Grant – (1956-68)
- 50 – Dave Flemming – (1965-74)
- 46 – Ronald Williams – (1998-2001)

Most touchdowns – season

- 17 – Chris Williams – 2012
- 16 – Brandon Banks – 2019
- 15 – Tony Champion – 1989
- 15 – Ronald Williams – 1999
- 15 – Ronald Williams – 2000
- 14 – Kenny Lawler – 2025

Most touchdowns – game

- 4 – Garney Henley – versus Saskatchewan Roughriders, October 15, 1962
- 4 – Terry Evanshen – versus Ottawa Rough Riders, September 7, 1975
- 4 – Kalin Hall – versus BC Lions, October 15, 1995
- 4 – Tony Akins – versus Winnipeg Blue Bombers, October 10, 1999

Most receiving touchdowns – career

- 75 – Earl Winfield – (1987-97)
- 51 – Tommy Grant – (1956-68)
- 45 – Rocky DiPietro – (1978-91)
- 44 – Brandon Banks – (2013-19, 2021)
- 42 – Garney Henley – (1960-75)
- 40 – Steve Stapler – (1981-88)

Most receiving touchdowns – season

- 15 – Tony Champion – 1989
- 14 – Kenny Lawler – 2025
- 13 – Terry Evanshen – 1975
- 13 – Steve Stapler – 1987
- 13 – Earl Winfield – 1990
- 13 – Earl Winfield – 1995
- 13 – Brandon Banks – 2019

Most receiving touchdowns – game

- 4 – Garney Henley – versus Saskatchewan Roughriders, October 15, 1962
- 4 – Terry Evanshen – versus Ottawa Rough Riders, September 7, 1975
- 4 – Tony Akins – versus Winnipeg Blue Bombers, October 10, 1999

Most rushing touchdowns – career

- 43 – Ronald Williams – (1998-2001)
- 30 – Troy Davis – (2001-05)
- 29 – Gerry McDougall – (1957-66)
- 28 – Dave Flemming – (1965-74)
- 25 – Bernie Faloney – (1957-64)
- 20 – Willie Bethea – (1963-70)

Most rushing touchdowns – season

- 14 – Ronald Williams – 1999
- 13 – Ronald Williams – 2000
- 13 – Ronald Williams – 1998
- 11 – Derrick McAdoo – 1989

Most rushing touchdowns – game

- 3 – Many times

Most punt return touchdowns – career

- 11 – Earl Winfield – (1987-97)
- 7 – Brandon Banks – (2013-19)
- 5 – Ron Howell – (1954-62)
- 5 – Chris Williams – (2011-12)
- 3 – Wally Zatylny – (1988-95)

Most punt return touchdowns – season

- 5 – Chris Williams – 2012
- 4 – Earl Winfield – 1988
- 4 – Brandon Banks – 2015

Most punt return touchdowns – game

- 2 – Ron Howell – versus Toronto Argonauts, September 20, 1959
- 2 – Earl Winfield – versus Edmonton Eskimos, September 17, 1993
- 2 – Brandon Banks – versus Montreal Alouettes, Sun, November 23, 2014

== Passing ==
Most passing yards – career

- 33,841 – Danny McManus – (1998-2005)
- 17,761 – Mike Kerrigan – (1986-96)
- 17,425 – Bernie Faloney – (1957-64)
- 15,555 – Jeremiah Masoli – (2013-19, 2021)
- 13,467 – Tom Clements – (1979-83)
- 12,885 – Bo Levi Mitchell – (2023-26)

Most passing yards – season

- 5,451 – Bo Levi Mitchell – 2024
- 5,367 – Henry Burris – 2012
- 5,334 – Danny McManus – 1999
- 5,296 – Bo Levi Mitchell – 2025
- 5,209 – Jeremiah Masoli – 2018
- 5,100 – Kevin Glenn – 2010

Most passing yards – game

- 572 – Joe Zuger – versus Saskatchewan Roughriders, October 15, 1962
- 542 – Anthony Calvillo – versus Montreal Alouettes, October 25, 1996
- 525 – Danny McManus – versus Winnipeg Blue Bombers, June 25, 2004
- 518 – Anthony Calvillo – versus Saskatchewan Roughriders, October 6, 1996
- 513 – Danny McManus – versus Ottawa Renegades, July 25, 2002
- 506 – Kevin Glenn – versus Montreal Alouettes, October 18, 2009

Most pass completions – career

- 2,368 – Danny McManus – (1998–2005)
- 1,274 – Mike Kerrigan – (1986–96)
- 1,203 – Jeremiah Masoli – (2013-19, 2021)
- 1,065 – Bernie Faloney – (1957–64)
- 1,012 – Bo Levi Mitchell – (2023-26)
- 969 – Tom Clements – (1979–83)

Most pass completions – season

- 428 – Bo Levi Mitchell – 2025
- 420 – Bo Levi Mitchell – 2024
- 391 – Henry Burris – 2012
- 388 – Kevin Glenn – 2010
- 378 – Jeremiah Masoli – 2018
- 373 – Henry Burris – 2013

Most pass completions – game

- 37 – Dieter Brock – versus Saskatchewan Roughriders, July 8, 1984
- 37 – Anthony Calvillo – versus Montreal Alouettes, October 25, 1996
- 37 – Henry Burris – versus Toronto Argonauts, November 1, 2012
- 36 – Anthony Calvillo – versus Birmingham Barracudas, July 15, 1995
- 36 – Dane Evans – versus Calgary Stampeders, June 18, 2022

Most passing touchdowns – career

- 164 – Danny McManus – (1998-2005)
- 115 – Mike Kerrigan – (1986-96)
- 97 – Bernie Faloney – (1957-64)
- 87 – Tom Clements – (1979-83)
- 83 – Bo Levi Mitchell – (2023-26)
- 80 – Jeremiah Masoli – (2013-19, 2021)

Most passing touchdowns – season

- 43 – Henry Burris – 2012
- 36 – Bo Levi Mitchell – 2025
- 33 – Kevin Glenn – 2010
- 32 – Bo Levi Mitchell – 2024
- 29 – Danny McManus – 2004
- 28 – Danny McManus – 1999
- 28 – Jeremiah Masoli – 2018

Most passing touchdowns – game

- 8 – Joe Zuger – versus Saskatchewan Roughriders, October 15, 1962

== Combined yards ==
Most combined yards – career

- 14,798 – Earl Winfield (67 RSH, 10,119 REC, 2,834 PR, 1,650 KR, 128 MFGR) – (1987–97)
- 13,686 – Brandon Banks (407 RSH, 5,678 REC, 3,049 PR, 3,773 KR, 779 MFGR) – (2013–19, 2021)
- 10,213 – Tommy Grant (559 RSH, 6,461 REC, 1,195 PR, 1,998 KR, 0 MFGR) – (1956–68)
- 9,818 – Rocky DiPietro (25 RSH, 9,761 REC, 3 PR, 29 KR, 0 MFGR) – (1978–91)
- 9,586 – Archie Amerson (356 RSH, 6,266 REC, 921 PR, 2,043 KR, 0 MFGR) – (1997–2005)
- 9,100 – Garney Henley (552 RSH, 4,657 REC, 2,944 PR, 947 KR, 0 MFGR) – (1960–75)

== Rushing ==
Most rushing yards – career

- 5,188 – Troy Davis – (2001-05)
- 4,270 – Gerry McDougall – (1957-66)
- 3,919 – Willie Bethea – (1963-70)
- 3,703 – Ronald Williams – (1998-2001)
- 3,467 – Jimmy Edwards – (1976-78)
- 3,398 – Dave Fleming – (1965-74)

Most rushing yards – season

- 1,628 – Troy Davis – 2004
- 1,581 – Jimmy Edwards – 1977
- 1,264 – Ronald Williams – 2000
- 1,223 – Andy Hopkins – 1973
- 1,207 – DeAndra' Cobb – 2009
- 1,206 – Troy Davis – 2003

Most rushing yards – game

- 233 – Troy Davis – versus Toronto Argonauts, September 6, 2004
- 213 – Gerry McDougall – versus Montreal Alouettes, September 28, 1957
- 212 – Jesse Lumsden – versus Winnipeg Blue Bombers, August 3, 2007
- 187 – Éric Lapointe – versus Winnipeg Blue Bombers, July 8, 1999

== Receiving ==
Most receiving yards – career

- 10,119 – Earl Winfield – (1987–97)
- 9,762 – Rocky DiPietro – (1978–91)
- 6,491 – Tommy Grant – (1956–68)
- 6,266 – Archie Amerson – (1997–2003)
- 5,796 – Darren Flutie – (1998–2002)
- 5,789 – Steve Stapler – (1981–88)

Most receiving yards – season

- 1,656 – Tony Champion – 1989
- 1,550 – Brandon Banks – 2019
- 1,516 – Steve Stapler – 1987
- 1,496 – Earl Winfield – 1995
- 1,443 – Kenny Lawler – 2025
- 1,426 – Mac Cody – 1996

Most receiving yards – game

- 275 – Larry Thompson – versus Winnipeg Blue Bombers, August 25, 1995
- 272 – Arland Bruce – versus Saskatchewan Roughriders, July 31, 2010
- 257 – Tony Akins – versus Winnipeg Blue Bombers, October 10, 1999
- 228 – Hal Patterson – versus Saskatchewan Roughriders, October 15, 1962
- 225 – Craig Yeast – versus Toronto Argonauts, October 21, 2004
- 207 – Archie Amerson – versus Ottawa Renegades, July 25, 2002
- 207 – Kenny Lawler – versus Toronto Argonauts, July 4, 2025

Most receptions – career

- 706 – Rocky DiPietro – (1978–91)
- 573 – Earl Winfield – (1987–97)
- 455 – Luke Tasker – (2013–19)
- 431 – Archie Amerson – (1997–2004)
- 422 – Brandon Banks – (2013–19, 2021)
- 405 – Darren Flutie – (1998–2002)

Most receptions – season

- 112 – Brandon Banks – 2019
- 104 – Luke Tasker – 2017
- 101 – Andy Fantuz – 2016
- 98 – Darren Flutie – 1998
- 95 – Tony Champion – 1989
- 95 – Bralon Addison – 2019

Most receptions – game

- 16 – Arland Bruce – versus Saskatchewan Roughriders, July 31, 2010
- 15 – Andy Fantuz – versus Calgary Stampeders, October 1, 2016
- 14 – Kiondré Smith – versus BC Lions, July 27, 2025
- 13 – Brandon Banks – versus Ottawa Redblacks, October 27, 2017
- 12 – Prechae Rodriguez – versus Montreal Alouettes, October 13, 2008
- 12 – Jimmy Edwards – versus B.C. Lions, July 29, 1976
- 12 – Luke Tasker – versus Ottawa Redblacks, October 27, 2017

== Interceptions ==
Most interceptions – career

- 59 – Garney Henley – (1960-75)
- 36 – Rob Hitchcock – (1995-2005)
- 35 – Al Brenner – (1971-74)
- 35 – Don Sutherin – (1958-66)
- 33 – Less Browne – (1984-88)
- 32 – Ralph Goldston – (1956-64)

Most interceptions – season

- 15 – Al Brenner – 1972
- 12 – Paul Bennett – 1984
- 12 – Gerald Bess – 1985
- 12 – Less Browne – 1985
- 11 – Don Sutherin – 1961
- 11 – Al Brenner – 1971

Most interceptions – game

- 4 – Less Browne – versus Montreal Concordes, August 21, 1986
- 4 – Al Brenner – versus Toronto Argonauts, November 5, 1972
- 4 – Don Sutherin – versus Edmonton Eskimos, September 11, 1961

== Quarterback sacks ==
- Note: Sacks were first recorded in 1980.

Most sacks – career

- 157 – Grover Covington – (1981–91)
- 115 – Joe Montford – (1996–2004)
- 81.5 – Mike Walker – (1982–89)
- 41 – Tim Cheatwood – (2002–06)
- 37 – Ted Laurent – (2014–19)
- 36 – Justin Hickman – (2009–11, 2014–15)

Most sacks – season

- 26 – Joe Montford – 1999
- 25 – Grover Covington – 1988
- 21 – Mike Walker – 1986
- 21 – Joe Montford – 1998
- 20 – Joe Montford – 2000
- 19 – Tim Cofield – 1993
- 19 – Joe Montford – 2001

Most sacks – game

- 5 – Tim Cofield – versus Toronto Argonauts, September 6, 1993
- 4 – Tim Cofield – versus Toronto Argonauts, July 22, 1993
- 4 – Joe Montford – versus Winnipeg Blue Bombers, October 29, 1999
- 4 – Eric Norwood – versus Edmonton Eskimos, September 20, 2014
- 4 – Julian Howsare – versus Toronto Argonauts, October 4, 2025

== Tackles ==
- Note: Tackles were first recorded in 1987, but there was no differentiation between Defensive and Special Teams tackles. Those categorical differences were added in 1991.

Most defensive tackles – career

- 727 – Simoni Lawrence – (2013–19, 2021–23)
- 484 – Rob Hitchcock – (1995–2006)
- 424 – Joe Montford – (1996–2001, 2003-04)
- 420 – Jamall Johnson – (2009–13)
- 338 – Calvin Tiggle – (1996–99)
- 329 – Mike O'Shea – (1993–95, 2000)

Most defensive tackles – season

- 114 – Zeke Moreno – 2007
- 108 – Jamall Johnson – 2007
- 106 – Calvin Tiggle – 1999
- 105 – Larry Dean – 2018
- 105 – Jovan Santos-Knox – 2022
- 101 – Jamall Johnson – 2010

Most defensive tackles – game

- 17 – Simoni Lawrence – at Winnipeg Blue Bombers, September 27, 2019
- 15 – Calvin Tiggle – at B.C. Lions, October 19, 1999
- 14 – Markeith Knowlton – versus Montreal Alouettes, June 26, 2008
- 13 – Darrell Patterson – at Ottawa Rough Riders, August 9, 1990
- 13 – Calvin Tiggle – at Calgary Stampeders, July 20, 1996

Most special teams tackles – career

- 122 – Rob Hitchcock (1995–2006)
- 122 – Marc Beswick (2009–14)

Most special teams tackles – season

- 37 – Dylan Barker – 2009
- 31 – Carthell Flowers-Lloyd – 2023
- 27 – Marc Beswick – 2011
- 25 – Dean Noel – 1996

Most special teams tackles – game

- 7 – Terry Wright – versus Ottawa Rough Riders, September 14, 1991
- 6 – Paul Bushey – at Edmonton Eskimos, September 27, 2019

== Field goals ==
Most field goals – career

- 655 – Paul Osbaldiston (1986–2003)
- 230 – Bernie Ruoff (1980–87)
- 178 – Marc Liegghio (2023–26)
- 135 – Justin Medlock (2011, 2014–15)
- 111 – Nick Setta (2007–09)
- 98 – Ian Sunter (1972–75)

Most field goals – season

- 54 – Paul Osbaldiston – 1989
- 52 – Paul Osbaldiston – 1990
- 52 – Marc Liegghio – 2025
- 49 – Justin Medlock – 2011
- 47 – Paul Osbaldiston – 2001
- 47 – Lirim Hajrullahu – 2019

Most field goals – game

- 8 – Paul Osbaldiston – at Ottawa Rough Riders, September 22, 1996
- 7 – Paul Osbaldiston – at Saskatchewan Roughriders, July 6, 2001
- 7 – Justin Medlock – versus BC Lions, October 22, 2011
- 7 – Marc Liegghio – versus Ottawa Redblacks, October 24, 2025

Highest field goal accuracy – career (minimum 75 attempts)

- 90.4% (178/197) – Marc Liegghio (2023–26)
- 89.0% (135/152) – Justin Medlock (2011, 2014–15)
- 85.3% (93/109) – Lirim Hajrullahu (2018–19)
- 82.7% (67/81) – Luca Congi (2012–13)
- 79.9% (111/139) – Nick Setta (2007–09)
- 72.5% (655/903) – Paul Osbaldiston (1986–2003)

Highest field goal accuracy – season (minimum 40 attempts)

- 92.9% (52/56) – Marc Liegghio – 2025
- 91.3% (42/46) – Marc Liegghio – 2026
- 90.7% (39/43) – Seth Small – 2022
- 89.6% (43/48) – Marc Liegghio – 2024
- 89.4% (42/47) – Justin Medlock – 2015
- 89.1% (49/55) – Justin Medlock – 2011

Longest field goal

- 58 – Brett Maher – at Calgary Stampeders, October 1, 2016
- 58 – Seth Small – versus Toronto Argonauts, August 26, 2022
- 57 – Bernie Ruoff – at Calgary Stampeders, July 20, 1984
- 57 – Paul Osbaldiston – at Winnipeg Blue Bombers, November 4, 1990
- 57 – Paul Osbaldiston – at Calgary Stampeders, October 13, 1997
- 57 – Justin Medlock – at Montreal Alouettes, September 11, 2011
- 57 – Sergio Castillo – versus Toronto Argonauts, September 4, 2017

Most consecutive field goals

- 33 – Marc Liegghio (September 20, 2024 – August 2, 2025)
- 24 – Luca Congi (August 16, 2012 – October 12, 2012)
