= 2000 Hamilton Tiger-Cats season =

Season of Canadian Football League team the Hamilton Tiger-Cats

- General manager: Neil Lumsden
- Head coach: Ron Lancaster
- Home stadium: Ivor Wynne Stadium

Results
- Record: 9–9–0–2
- Division place: 2nd, East
- Playoffs: Lost East Semi-Final
- Team MOP: Joe Montford
- Team MOC: Michael Philbrick
- Team MOR: Willie Fells

Uniform

The 2000 Hamilton Tiger-Cats season was the 43rd season for the team in the Canadian Football League (CFL) and their 51st overall. The Tiger-Cats finished in second place in the East Division with a 9–9–0–2 record in the first CFL season that awarded points to overtime losses. The Tiger-Cats failed to defend their Grey Cup title when they lost to the Winnipeg Blue Bombers in the East Semi-Final.

== Offseason ==
=== CFL draft ===
Rd	Pick	Player	Position	School
2	14	Mike Juhasz	WR	North Dakota
3	22	Paul Lambert	G	Western Michigan
4	30	Joe McCullum	OL	Utah
5	38	James MacLean	SB	Queen's
6	46	Doug Van Moorsel	OL	California, PA

=== Preseason ===
Week	Date	Opponent	Score	Result	Record
A	June 21	vs. Winnipeg Blue Bombers	27–27	Tie	0–0–1
B	June 27	at Montreal Alouettes	43–33	Loss	0–1–1

== Regular season ==
=== Season standings ===
East Division
Pos	Team	Pld	W	L	T	OTL	PF	PA	PD	Pts
1	Montreal Alouettes (C, Q)	18	12	6	0	0	594	379	+215	24
2	Hamilton Tiger-Cats (Q)	18	9	7	0	2	470	446	+24	20
3	Winnipeg Blue Bombers (Q)	18	7	9	1	1	539	596	−57	16
4	Toronto Argonauts	18	7	10	1	0	390	562	−172	15

Source: "CFL.ca". Archived from the original on 2009-06-29.
(C) First round bye; (Q) Qualified for playoffs

=== Schedule ===
Week	Date	Opponent	Score	Result	Record	Streak
1	July 7	vs. BC Lions	33–26	Loss	0–1	L1
2	July 14	at Edmonton Eskimos	28–21	Win	1–1	W1
3	July 21	vs. Saskatchewan Roughriders	40–34	Win	2–1	W2
4	July 28	at Toronto Argonauts	23–17	Win	3–1	W3
5	Aug 4	vs. Edmonton Eskimos	16–10	Loss	3–2	L1
6	Aug 11	at Saskatchewan Roughriders	29–23	Win	4–2	W1
7	Aug 18	vs. Montreal Alouettes	37–26	Win	5–2	W2
8	Aug 25	at Winnipeg Blue Bombers	38–33	Loss	5–3	L1
9	Sept 4	vs. Toronto Argonauts	42–12	Win	6–3	W1
10	Sept 10	at Montreal Alouettes	15–9	Win	7–3	W2
11	Sept 16	at Calgary Stampeders	41–38	Loss	7–4	L1
12	Sept 23	vs. Winnipeg Blue Bombers	43–6	Win	8–4	W1
13	Sept 30	vs. Montreal Alouettes	32–16	Loss	8–5	L1
14	Oct 7	at Toronto Argonauts	29–12	Loss	8–6	L2
15	Oct 13	vs. Toronto Argonauts	32–8	Loss	8–7	L3
16	Oct 20	at Winnipeg Blue Bombers	27–24	Loss	8–8	L4
17	Oct 28	at BC Lions	28–22	Loss	8–9	L5
18	Nov 5	vs. Calgary Stampeders	24–22	Win	9–9	W1

== Postseason ==
Round	Date	Opponent	Score	Result
East Semi-Final	Nov 12	Winnipeg Blue Bombers	22–20	Loss

== Roster ==
2000 Hamilton Tiger-Cats final roster
Quarterbacks: 12 Billy Dicken; 11 Cody Ledbetter; 14 Danny McManus; Running backs: 33 Jeff Johnson; 34 Jarrett Smith; 24 Ronald Williams; Receivers: 81 Tony Akins; 9 Archie Amerson; 82 Darren Flutie; 2 Corey Grant; 89 Andrew Grigg; 87 Mike Juhasz; 18 Mike Morreale; 86 Trevor Shaw	Offensive linemen: 67 Gary Brown G; 55 Chris Burns G; 50 Pascal Cheron T; 51 Carl Coulter C; 64 Seth Dittman T; 68 Dave Hack T; 66 Mike Mihelic G; 54 Mark Verbeek C; Defensive linemen: 99 Jeff Cummins DT; 90 Gonzalo Floyd DE; 53 Joe Montford DE; 77 Mike Philbrick DT; 93 Aaron Williams DT; 97 Mark Word DE	Linebackers: 47 Warren Muzika; 59 Mike O'Shea; 17 Sean Woodson; Defensive backs: 21 Kevin Brooks; 4 Nick Harper; 42 Rob Hitchcock; 13 Clifford Ivory; 30 Chris Shelling; 22 Orlondo Steinauer; 39 Gerald Vaughn; 7 Kyle Walters; Special teams: 3 Paul Osbaldiston K/P	Injured list: 5 Todd Bankhead QB; 40 Willie Fells LB; 15 Joe Hagins LB; 19 Donald Smith DB; 37 Jerry Urias DB; Italics indicate American players

== Awards and honours ==
=== 2000 CFL All-Stars ===
- Joe Montford – Defensive End
