= 2001 Hamilton Tiger-Cats season =

Season of Canadian Football League team the Hamilton Tiger-Cats

- Head coach: Ron Lancaster
- Home stadium: Ivor Wynne Stadium

Results
- Record: 11–7
- Division place: 2nd, East
- Playoffs: Lost East Final
- Team MOP: Danny McManus
- Team MOC: Andrew Grigg
- Team MOR: Paul Lambert

Uniform

The 2001 Hamilton Tiger-Cats season was the 44th season for the team in the Canadian Football League (CFL) and their 52nd overall. The Tiger-Cats finished in second place in the East Division with an 11–7 record but lost to the powerhouse Winnipeg Blue Bombers in the East Final.

== Offseason ==
=== CFL draft ===
Rd	Pick	Player	Position	School
2	12	Karim Grant	LB	Acadia
3	20	Randy Bowles	TE	Simon Fraser
4	28	Ryan Donnelly	OL	McMaster
5	36	Mike Waszczuk	LB	Slippery Rock
6	44	Will Grant	QB	Acadia

=== Preseason ===
Week	Date	Opponent	Score	Result	Record
A	June 22	at Toronto Argonauts	29–16	Win	1–0
B	June 27	vs. Winnipeg Blue Bombers	38–10	Win	2–0

== Regular season ==
=== Season standings ===
East Division
Pos	Team	Pld	W	L	T	OTL	PF	PA	PD	Pts
1	Winnipeg Blue Bombers (C, Q)	18	14	4	0	0	509	383	+126	28
2	Hamilton Tiger-Cats (Q)	18	11	7	0	0	440	420	+20	22
3	Montreal Alouettes (Q)	18	9	9	0	0	454	419	+35	18
4	Toronto Argonauts	18	7	10	0	1	432	455	−23	15

Source: "CFL.ca". Archived from the original on 2009-06-29.
(C) First round bye; (Q) Qualified for playoffs

=== Schedule ===
Week	Date	Opponent	Score	Result	Record
1	July 6	at Saskatchewan Roughriders	30–28	Loss	0–1
2	July 12	vs. BC Lions	26–5	Win	1–1
3	July 20	at Toronto Argonauts	24–18	Win	2–1
4	July 26	vs. Winnipeg Blue Bombers	24–19	Win	3–1
5	Aug 2	vs. Edmonton Eskimos	24–14	Loss	3–2
6	Aug 10	at Montreal Alouettes	27–17	Loss	3–3
7	Aug 16	vs. Winnipeg Blue Bombers	20–17	Loss	3–4
8	Aug 24	at Edmonton Eskimos	20–12	Win	4–4
9	Sept 3	vs. Toronto Argonauts	26–13	Win	5–4
10	Sept 8	at Winnipeg Blue Bombers	63–31	Loss	5–5
11	Sept 15	at BC Lions	Postponed		
12	Sept 22	vs. Calgary Stampeders	29–26	Win	6–5
13	Sept 30	vs. Montreal Alouettes	21–20	Win	7–5
14	Oct 8	at Calgary Stampeders	35–33	Win	8–5
15	Oct 14	at Winnipeg Blue Bombers	24–17	Loss	8–6
16	Oct 21	vs. Saskatchewan Roughriders	30–24	Win	9–6
17	Oct 28	at Montreal Alouettes	38–18	Win	10–6
18	Nov 3	vs. Toronto Argonauts	31–20	Win	11–6
18	Nov 6	at BC Lions	24–12	Loss	11–7

== Postseason ==
Round	Date	Opponent	Score	Result
East Semi-Final	Nov 11	Montreal Alouettes	24–12	Win
East Final	Nov 18	at Winnipeg Blue Bombers	28–13	Loss

== Roster ==
2001 Hamilton Tiger-Cats final roster
Quarterbacks: 11 Cody Ledbetter; 14 Danny McManus; 8 Butchie Washington; Running backs: 35 Randy Bowles; 32 Troy Davis; 37 Duane Forde; 33 Jeff Johnson; 34 Jarrett Smith; Receivers: 9 Archie Amerson; 82 Darren Flutie; 2 Corey Grant; 89 Andrew Grigg; 18 Mike Morreale; 86 Trevor Shaw	Offensive linemen: 67 Gary Brown G; 51 Carl Coulter C; 64 Seth Dittman T; 68 Dave Hack T; 65 Paul Lambert G/C; 66 Mike Mihelic G; 54 Mark Verbeek C; Defensive linemen: 98 Larry Fitzpatrick DT; 90 Gonzalo Floyd DE; 75 Tom Hipsz DT; 53 Joe Montford DE; 77 Mike Philbrick DT	Linebackers: 36 Jason Lamar; 47 Warren Muzika; 38 Mark Robichaud; 17 Sean Woodson; Defensive backs: 25 Duane Butler; 42 Rob Hitchcock; 13 Clifford Ivory; 26 Dedric Mathis; 6 Troy Saunders; 30 Chris Shelling; 39 Gerald Vaughn; 7 Kyle Walters; Special teams: 3 Paul Osbaldiston K/P	Injured list: 81 Tony Akins WR; 95 Tim Beauchamp DE; 55 Chris Burns G; 50 Pascal Cheron G; 29 Mace Freeman SB; 31 Brandon Hamilton DB; 99 Ben Huff DT; 87 Mike Juhasz SB; 93 Aaron Williams DT; Italics indicate American players

== Awards and honours ==
=== 2001 CFL All-Stars ===
- Rob Hitchcock - Safety
- Joe Montford - Defensive End
- Paul Osbaldiston - Kicker
- Chris Shelling - Linebacker
