= List of Hamilton Tiger-Cats head coaches =

The Hamilton Tiger-Cats are a professional Canadian football team based in Hamilton, Ontario, and are members of the East Division in the Canadian Football League (CFL).

The Tiger-Cats were founded in 1950, with the merger of the Hamilton Tigers and the Hamilton Wildcats. Since the merger, the team has appeared in 21 Grey Cup finals and has won eight championships. The current Tiger-Cats head coach is Scott Milanovich.

== Key ==
General
#	Number of coaches^{[a]}
†	Elected to the Canadian Football Hall of Fame in the builders category
Achievements	Achievements during their Hamilton head coaching tenure

Regular season
GC	Games coached	T	Ties = 1 point
W	Wins = 2 points	PTS	Points
L	Losses = 0 points	Win%	Winning percentage^{[b]}

Playoffs and Grey Cup
PGC	Games coached
PW	Wins
PL	Losses
PT	Ties
PWin%	Winning percentage

== Head coaches ==
Note: Statistics are current through the end of the 2026 CFL season.

#	Name	Term^{[b]}	GC	W	L	T	PTS	Win%	PGC	PW	PL	PT	PWin%	Achievements
1	Carl M. Voyles	1950–1955	76	48	27	1	97	.640	15	6	9	0	.400	41st Grey Cup championship
2	Jim Trimble	1956–1962	98	60	36	2	122	.625	18	10	8	0	.556	1961 Annis Stukus Trophy winner 46th Grey Cup championship
3	Ralph Sazio†	1963–1967	70	49	20	1	99	.710	15	9	5	1	.643	1964 Annis Stukus Trophy winner 51st Grey Cup championship 53rd Grey Cup championship 55th Grey Cup championship
4	Joe Restic	1968–1970	42	22	17	3	47	.564	4	0	4	0	.000	
5	Al Dorow	1971	14	7	7	0	14	.500	3	1	1	1	.500	
6	Jerry Williams	1972–1975	60	30	29	1	61	.508	4	2	2	0	.500	60th Grey Cup championship
7	George Dickson	1976	2	0	2	0	0	.000	–	–	–	–	–	
8	Bob Shaw	1976–1977	30	13	17	0	26	.433	2	1	1	0	.500	1976 Annis Stukus Trophy winner
9	Tom Dimitroff, Sr.	1978	5	1	3	1	3	.250	–	–	–	–	–	
10	John Payne	1978–1980	43	18	24	1	37	.429	4	1	3	0	.250	
11	Frank Kush	1981	16	11	4	1	23	.733	1	0	1	0	.000	
12	Bud Riley	1982–1983	28	12	15	1	25	.444	1	0	1	0	.000	
13	Al Bruno	1983–1987	62	29	31	2	60	.483	9	5	4	0	.555	1986 Annis Stukus Trophy winner 74th Grey Cup championship
14	Ted Schmitz	1987	6	1	5	0	2	.167	1	0	1	0	.000	
–	Al Bruno	1988–1990	48	25	23	0	50	.521	4	2	2	0	.500	
15	David Beckman	1990–1991	14	2	12	0	4	.143	–	–	–	–	–	
16	John Gregory	1991–1994	52	21	31	0	42	.404	4	2	2	0	.500	
17	Don Sutherin	1994–1997	67	20	47	0	40	.298	2	0	2	0	.000	
18	Urban Bowman	1997	11	1	11	0	2	.091	–	–	–	–	–	
19	Ron Lancaster	1998–2003	108	51	56	1	103	.477	8	5	3	0	.625	1998 Annis Stukus Trophy winner 87th Grey Cup championship
20	Greg Marshall	2004–2006	40	14	25	1	29	.359	1	0	1	0	.000	2004 Annis Stukus Trophy winner
–	Ron Lancaster	2006	14	4	10	0	8	.286	–	–	–	–	–	
21	Charlie Taaffe	2007–2008	28	5	23	0	10	.179	–	–	–	–	–	
22	Marcel Bellefeuille	2008–2011	62	27	35	0	54	.435	4	1	3	0	.250	
23	George Cortez	2012	18	6	12	0	12	.333	–	–	–	–	–	
24	Kent Austin	2013–2017	80	36	44	0	72	.450	8	4	4	0	.500	
25	June Jones	2017–2018	28	14	14	0	28	.500	2	1	1	0	.500	
26	Orlondo Steinauer	2019–2023	68	39	29	0	78	.574	7	3	4	0	.429	2019 Annis Stukus Trophy winner
27	Scott Milanovich	2024–present	54	24	30	0	48	.444	1	0	1	0	.000	

== Notes ==
- ^{a} A running total of the number of coaches of the Tiger-Cats. Thus, any coach who has two or more separate terms as head coach is only counted once.
- ^{b} Each year is linked to an article about that particular CFL season.
