= Archie Amerson =

American gridiron football player (born 1974)

No. 9
- Positions: Running back, Slotback

Personal information
- Born: August 24, 1974 (age 52); San Diego, California, U.S.

Career information
- High school: Morse High School
- College: Northern Arizona

Career history
- 1997–2000: Hamilton Tiger-Cats
- 2001: Toronto Argonauts
- 2001–2004: Hamilton Tiger-Cats

Awards and highlights
- Grey Cup champion (1999); Walter Payton Award (1996)

Archie J. Amerson (born August 24, 1974) is an American former professional Canadian football running back and slotback who played in the Canadian Football League (CFL) from 1997 to 2004, appearing in 122 regular season games for the Hamilton Tiger-Cats and one regular season game for the Toronto Argonauts. In 1999, he was part of the Tiger-Cats team that won the 87th Grey Cup. He missed the entire 2005 season due to injury and was released by the Tiger-Cats afterwards. At the time of his release, Amerson was one of the most prolific receivers in Tiger-Cats history, ranking third in receptions, fourth in receiving yards, fifth in kickoff return yards, and sixth in touchdowns.

Amerson played high school football at Samuel F.B. Morse High School in San Diego, California. He went on to play college football for the Dixie State Rebels from 1993 to 1994 and was named a junior college All-American each year. He then played for the Northern Arizona Lumberjacks of Northern Arizona University from 1995 to 1996. In Amerson's senior year of 1996, he won the Walter Payton Award as the best offensive player in Division I-AA (now FCS) football.

== Early life ==
Amerson played high school football at Samuel F. B. Morse High School in San Diego as both a running back and defensive back. In 1991, Amerson primarily played as a cornerback. Although officially designated the backup running back for Morse that year, he never carried the ball. Amerson's role sharply shifted as a senior in 1992 when the coaching staff played him as the team's lead running back in addition to his role on defense. In October, Amerson rushed for 197 yards and four touchdowns in a 48–0 win over Patrick Henry High School. Amerson's strong game against Patrick Henry saw his role on the team increase as he ran for 675 yards and 13 touchdowns over a three-week period. He finished his only season as a running back for Morse with 1,475 rushing yards to lead his section. Amerson was designated the offensive player of the year in the California Interscholastic Federation (CIF) after Morse won the CIF San Diego section championship. While in high school, Amerson also played Little League Baseball for the Skyline Pirates. He made California District 42's All-Star team in 1992.

== College career ==
In 1993 and 1994, Amerson attended Dixie State College, now the four-year Utah Tech University, and played for the Dixie State Rebels, now the Trailblazers. He rushed for over 3,000 yards with the Rebels and led the nation among junior college running backs in 1994, recording 1,691 yards and 20 touchdowns. He was named to the junior college All-America team in both years with the Rebels. In December 1994, Amerson was suspended from playing in the Dixie Rotary Bowl after being arrested in connection with a "brawl". After the 1994 season, Amerson transferred to Northern Arizona University with hopes of playing on defense. His plans were halted by an injury to Northern Arizona's starting halfback. Amerson was forced to remain a running back and continued successfully at that position, rushing for 1,117 yards with 12 touchdowns in 1995.

Amerson had an All-American season in 1996, rushing for 2,079 yards on 333 carries with 25 touchdowns. He recorded a career-high 289 rushing yards in a September game against the Portland State Vikings. On October 5, Amerson scored seven rushing touchdowns against the Weber State Wildcats. This earned him multiple Division I-AA records, including most touchdowns, most rushing touchdowns, and most points scored with 42 points. Amerson received the Walter Payton Award as the best offensive player in Division I-AA football. He was later inducted into the Northern Arizona University Athletics Hall of Fame, and Northern Arizona retired his jersey (number 9) in honor of his college career.

== Professional career ==
=== Hamilton Tiger-Cats ===
==== 1997 season ====
Amerson was eligible for the 1997 NFL draft but went unselected. Instead, he played professionally in the CFL, initially being signed by the Hamilton Tiger-Cats. The team placed Amerson on their practice squad to start the season, but he was forced into action after Ted Long suffered a groin injury. Amerson started in his first career appearance against the Winnipeg Blue Bombers, catching his first career touchdown pass in the 18–33 loss. While the Tiger-Cats continued to struggle during the game and dropped to a 0–3 record, Amerson's performance was praised, with The Hamilton Spectator calling him "the quickest back ever". He followed his first game with a breakout performance against the heavily–favored Toronto Argonauts, running for 100 yards on 18 carries. By the end of August, Amerson led the Tiger-Cats' offense with 298 rushing yards, 12th most in the CFL despite not playing in the first two games. After being briefly sidelined with a foot injury, Amerson returned to a starting role and rushed for 139 yards against the Calgary Stampeders in late September. He finished the season with 1,044 combined rushing and receiving yards along with five touchdowns over 15 games. Amerson struggled with ball security throughout the season, recording six fumbles. The Tiger-Cats nominated Amerson as top rookie in the CFL.

==== 1998 season ====
During the offseason, the Tiger-Cats signed running back Ron Williams. Williams was known for power running and was described as a "210-pound battering ram" by The Hamilton Spectator. The presence of Williams allowed the Tiger-Cats to develop Amerson further as a receiving back, and the team further experimented by designing plays where Amerson lined up as a slotback and using him as a kick returner. He went on to catch 65 passes for 750 yards and five touchdowns in addition to rushing for 703 yards and three touchdowns. Amerson immediately established himself as a viable receiving option in the season opener against Calgary when he caught six passes for 103 yards and two touchdowns. In late July, Amerson caught a short pass and ran 74 yards for a touchdown against the Stampeders. The play was described as "the Ticats' biggest play so far this season" by Larry Sicinski of The Hamilton Spectator. Amerson remained effective on the ground, rushing for 114 yards in an early August game against the Edmonton Eskimos, but he continued to struggle with fumbles throughout the season.

In a mid-August victory over the Eskimos, Amerson threw the first touchdown pass of his career to wide receiver Andrew Grigg after lining up as a running back. In the same game, he caught a career-long 89-yard touchdown pass. By September, Amerson was considered a potential nominee for the CFL's Most Outstanding Player Award. Toward the end of the season, the Tiger-Cats began to use Williams and Amerson in distinct roles, with Williams performing most of the ground work while Amerson acted as a receiver. Amerson finished the season sixth in the league in all-purpose yardage. The Tiger-Cats lost to the Stampeders in the 86th Grey Cup. In the final quarter of the Grey Cup, Amerson caught a short pass and ran for a 47-yard completion to set up a touchdown. During the play, he dodged two Stampeders defenders (Darryl Hall and Alondra Johnson), causing them to collide. Both Stampeders players were injured on the play, with Johnson losing consciousness.

==== 1999 season ====
Amerson became a free agent after the 1998 season but expressed a strong desire to continue playing for the Tiger-Cats. Hamilton re-signed Amerson to a one-year contract worth approximately $50,000 in late March with a team option for an additional year. Amerson spent time practicing as a punt returner during training camp despite not having returned a punt since high school. In the regular season opener, Amerson returned a punt 42 yards to set up a touchdown drive. In the second game of the season, Amerson suffered a knee injury which forced him to miss several games. He returned in mid-August, catching a touchdown in his first game back against the Montreal Alouettes. In a September rematch against the Alouettes, Amerson caught a career-high eight receptions.

Amerson's role as a rusher was greatly reduced in 1999, both due to his early knee injury and the returning Williams, who developed into the team's featured power back. Amerson's only significant rushing play was a career-high 70-yard touchdown run in late September. After Amerson re-injured his knee in October, Tony Akins received his first start in which he recorded 257 receiving yards. After Akins' first game, head coach Ron Lancaster told the media that Amerson would primarily be used as a kick returner going forward, with Akins remaining in the lineup even after Amerson returned. Despite this, Amerson continued to see time as both a receiver and punt returner upon his return later that month. He finished the season with 47 receptions for 700 yards and five touchdowns through 13 games played. The Hamilton Tiger-Cats defeated the Calgary Stampeders 32–21 in the 87th Grey Cup, making Amerson a Grey Cup champion.

==== 2000 season ====
In 2000, Amerson was used heavily as a receiver and kick returner, recording 70 receptions for 1,198 receiving yards and six touchdowns as well as 948 return yards over 51 kick returns, all career-highs at the time. In a July game against the Saskatchewan Roughriders, Amerson caught a 74-yard touchdown pass in the eventual 40–34 win. He followed this up with five catches for 180 yards and two touchdowns the next month when the Tiger-Cats played the Roughriders again. Following this, Amerson was named player of the week and described by The Hamilton Spectator as both halves of "Hamilton's one-two punch". In September, Amerson caught a 75-yard touchdown pass to help the Tiger-Cats defeat the Alouettes 15–9.

While Amerson had his best season as a receiver through September, he was criticized for his play toward the end of the season. The Hamilton Spectator described him as "slumping" in October while pointing out his poor yardage per punt return (6.8 yards). The Calgary Herald stated that Amerson had "disappeared" over a seven-week period when he caught only 25 passes for 302 yards and no touchdowns, statistics far below those he had set earlier in the season. Despite the slump, Amerson finished with career-high receptions (70), receiving yards (1,166), and touchdowns (six) while finishing second in the CFL for all-purpose yards (2,407). The Tiger-Cats lost to the Winnipeg Blue Bombers 22–20 in the East Division semi-final. Amerson scored a touchdown for the Tiger-Cats, but he later lost 16 yards on a crucial pitch play with 90 seconds left on the game clock. After the failed run, the Blue Bombers received the ball back and kicked a field goal to win the game.

=== Toronto Argonauts ===
Amerson again became a free agent after the 2000 season. Rather than pursue Amerson, the Tiger-Cats elected to sign fullback Duane Forde. The signing represented a shift from a receiving back to a running back who primarily blocks. In May 2001, Amerson signed a two-year contract with the Toronto Argonauts. The Argonauts expected to use Amerson as a running back, slotback, and return specialist. Head coach Mike Clemons stated that he expected Amerson to break records with the Argonauts, but Amerson's time with the team was short. In the first game of the season, he suffered an ankle injury that forced him to miss several games. During this time, receiver and return specialist Greg Hill became increasingly involved in the offense and began to fill the multi-purpose role originally expected of Amerson. The Argonauts dropped Amerson from the active roster and offered him a position on the practice squad in late July. In late August, the Tiger-Cats re-signed Amerson. Clemons later told the media he had been discussing the possibility of re-signing Amerson with other members of the coaching staff when the Tiger-Cats acquired Amerson.

=== Return to the Tiger-Cats ===
==== 2001 season ====
Immediately after signing with the Tiger-Cats, Amerson played in the Labour Day Classic against Toronto, catching a touchdown pass and returning a punt for 24 yards. While the Tiger-Cats initially expected to use Amerson more in the rushing game than they had in the past, the team returned to using him as a receiving back by the end of September due to weaknesses in the offensive line. As the season progressed, Troy Davis emerged as the Tiger-Cats' starting running back and leading rusher while Amerson was used as a receiving back. After missing a game in early October due to bruised ribs, Amerson was effective as a receiver for the rest of the month, finishing with three touchdowns in the last two games of October. Due to a coaching decision to rest Davis prior to the playoffs, Amerson started in the final game of the regular season against the BC Lions.

According to The Province, the Tiger-Cats "rode Amerson's coattails" on their way to a 24–14 win against the Alouettes in the Eastern Semi-Final. He finished with 250 all-purpose yards, a receiving touchdown, and a punt return touchdown. His 94-yard punt return touchdown set a team record. Amerson received widespread praise for his performance in the game, and The Hamilton Spectator described him as the "Ticat hero who almost got away". The Tiger-Cats lost to the Winnipeg Blue Bombers in the East Final the following week. Amerson's most significant play of the East Final was a "leaping" catch in the third-quarter, but it was called back due to an offensive holding penalty.

==== 2002 season ====
After Mike Morreale left the Tiger-Cats in free agency, the team moved Amerson to the slotback position. The change of position placed him consistently on the starting roster for the first time in his career. Amerson's first receiving touchdown of the season tied a July game against the Stampeders, which the Tiger-Cats later won 34–31 in overtime. Two weeks later, he caught nine passes for 221 yards against the Ottawa Renegades. By the beginning of August, Amerson had emerged as "the top of the pile of Hamilton Tiger-Cats receivers" (ahead of Hall of Famer Darren Flutie) and was second in the league for receiving yardage. After an injury to starting running back Troy Davis in September, the Tiger-Cats utilized Amerson both as their starting slotback and backup running back, as they lacked a third-string running back. The majority of his production continued to come as a slotback. He recorded 147 receiving yards in the first game after being listed as a running back on the roster, including a touchdown catch in overtime to win 35–28 against the Montreal Alouettes.

In early October, Amerson missed a game with a leg injury but returned the following week to catch two touchdowns against the Argonauts. Amerson finished the season with 970 yards on 61 catches with six touchdowns. The Tiger-Cats did not make the playoffs after losing in the final week of the season.

==== 2003 season ====
Amerson was re-signed by the Tiger-Cats in January 2003 to a deal that involved "substantially more" than the $45,000 he received the previous season. The Tiger-Cats lost several receivers to retirement or trades, and Amerson was one of only two starting receivers left on the team from the previous year. Through the first half of the season, the Tiger-Cats receivers struggled. Amerson led the team in receiving yards, but he often was double-covered by opposing teams and struggled to get open. Amerson was also criticized for dropping passes in important situations. He recorded 960 receiving yards and four touchdowns during the regular season. The Tiger-Cats finished the season with a 1–17 record amid controversy after the owners of the team failed to pay players, including Amerson. While the CFL took over the team and paid players their full salaries as recorded with the league, Amerson reportedly lost $40,000 in expected salary due to a portion of his contract being unregistered with the league.

==== 2004 season ====
During the offseason, Amerson remained in Canada for the first time during his career to train with incoming receivers' coach Paul LaPolice. The Tiger-Cats receivers, including Amerson, started the season more successfully than the previous year. Through the first three games, Amerson was ninth in the CFL in receiving yards with 224 yards on eight catches. Amerson caught 47 passes for 894 yards and five touchdowns through fourteen regular season games. In October, an injury forced Amerson to undergo surgery to repair the torn cartilage in his knee. He returned in the Tiger-Cats' semi-final loss to the Argonauts.

=== Retirement ===
Prior to the 2005 season, Amerson signed a two-year contract extension with the Tiger-Cats, and he was expected to feature heavily among their receivers. Shortly before the start of training camp, Amerson experienced nerve issues in his left leg which prevented him from running. While the prognosis was initially optimistic, the media considered his season to be "compromised" by the start of the regular season. The source of the injury was a herniated disk which pressed against nerves and caused muscle atrophy throughout Amerson's left leg. Amerson remained out for the entire season and was released by the team on January 31, 2006. As of his retirement, Amerson was one of the most prolific receivers in Tiger-Cats history, ranking third in receptions, fourth in receiving yards, fifth in kickoff return yards, and sixth in touchdowns.

=== Season statistics ===
			Receiving					Rushing					Punt returns					Kick returns					Misc	
Year	Team	GP	Rec	Yds	Avg	Long	TD	Att	Yds	Avg	Long	TD	PR	Yds	Avg	Long	TD	KR	Yds	Avg	Long	TD	Tkls	Fumbles
1997	HAM	15	40	414	10.4	46	1	144	630	4.4	64	4	0	0	0.0	0	0	2	34	17.0	17	0	3	6
1998	HAM	18	65	750	11.5	89	5	160	703	4.4	69	3	0	0	0.0	0	0	24	594	24.8	54	0	3	4
1999	HAM	13	47	700	14.9	60	5	4	67	16.8	70	1	25	183	7.3	42	0	18	393	21.8	57	0	0	2
2000	HAM	18	70	1,198	17.1	75	6	6	16	2.7	10	0	51	351	6.9	38	0	51	948	18.6	40	0	5	2
2001	TOR	1	5	32	6.4	15	0	0	0	0.0	0	0	0	0	0.0	0	0	2	42	21.0	28	0	0	0
2001	HAM	9	26	380	14.6	41	5	21	120	5.7	25	0	29	231	8.0	25	0	3	67	22.3	32	0	2	4
2002	HAM	17	61	970	15.9	53	6	11	53	4.8	13	0	8	105	13.1	68	0	1	7	7.0	7	0	4	3
2003	HAM	18	75	960	12.8	45	4	9	41	4.6	9	0	4	51	12.8	23	0	0	0	0.0	0	0	7	0
2004	HAM	14	47	894	19.0	68	5	1	24	24.0	24	0	0	0	0.0	0	0	0	0	0.0	0	0	3	0
Total		123	436	6,298	14.4	89	37	356	1,654	4.6	70	8	117	921	7.9	68	0	101	2,085	20.6	57	0	27	21

== Personal life ==
Amerson is the son of Archie Amerson Sr., who played minor league baseball for teams associated with the Minnesota Twins and the New York Mets of Major League Baseball. He was born in San Diego, California, where he returned in the offseason during his CFL career. Amerson's brother, Andrew, played college football for Cal State Northridge and Troy State. Andrew Amerson briefly signed with the Toronto Argonauts but did not play in any games.

After retiring from football, Amerson taught classes at a gym owned by his father in San Diego. In August 2006, he ran a summer camp for children interested in football. The camp was affiliated with the Hamilton Tiger-Cats.
