= Tommy Grant (Canadian football) =

Canadian football player (1935–2011)

Profile
- Positions: Wide receiver, Running back, Punt returner, Kick returner

Personal information
- Born: January 9, 1935; Windsor, Ontario, Canada
- Died: October 18, 2011 (aged 76); London, Ontario, Canada
- Listed height: 5 ft 11 in (1.80 m)
- Listed weight: 200 lb (91 kg)

Career information
- CJFL: Windsor AKO Fratmen

Career history
- 1956–1968: Hamilton Tiger-Cats
- 1969: Winnipeg Blue Bombers

Awards and highlights
- 4× Grey Cup champion (1957, 1963, 1965, 1967); Most Outstanding Canadian Award (1964); Gruen Trophy (1956); CFL All-Star (1964); 2× CFL East All-Star (1963, 1964)
- Canadian Football Hall of Fame (Class of 1995)

Tommy Grant (January 9, 1935 – October 18, 2011) was a Canadian professional football player who played 14 years in the Canadian Football League with the Hamilton Tiger-Cats and the Winnipeg Blue Bombers.

== Junior football ==
Grant played for the Windsor AKO Fratmen junior team that played in the Canadian Junior final.

== CFL ==
Grant played 13 years with the Hamilton Tiger-Cats from 1956 to 1968 and one more with the Winnipeg Blue Bombers in 1969. An all-star twice (as a running back and flanker) he rushed for 559 yards and caught 329 passes for 6542 yards in his career. He won the Gruen Trophy as the best rookie in the East in 1956 and the CFL's Most Outstanding Canadian Award in 1964. He played in nine Grey Cup games, all with Hamilton, winning four of them.

Grant was inducted into the Canadian Football Hall of Fame in 1995.

== Video clips ==
- Seen as a wide receiver and punt returner in the 1967 Grey Cup game won by Hamilton against Saskatchewan on YouTube
