= Garney Henley =

American gridiron football player (born 1935)

No. 26
- Positions: Wide receiver, Defensive back

Personal information
- Born: December 21, 1935 (age 90); Elgin, North Dakota, U.S.
- Listed height: 6 ft 0 in (1.83 m)
- Listed weight: 180 lb (82 kg)

Career information
- High school: Hayti (SD)
- College: Huron
- NFL draft: 1960: 15th round, 173rd overall pick
- AFL draft: 1960

Career history
- 1960–1975: Hamilton Tiger-Cats

Awards and highlights
- 4× Grey Cup champion (1963, 1965, 1967, 1972); 10× CFL All-Star (1963–1972); 10× CFL East All-Star (1963–1972); CFL's Most Outstanding Player Award (1972); 2× Jeff Russel Memorial Trophy (1963, 1972); Tiger-Cats' Best-of-the-Century Team (1967); University of Guelph Athletics Hall of Fame; Ontario Sports Hall of Fame (2015); South Dakota Sports Hall of Fame; South Dakota Hall of Fame
- Canadian Football Hall of Fame (Class of 1979)
- College Football Hall of Fame (Class of 2004)

Garney Henley (born December 21, 1935) is an American former professional football player who played in the Canadian Football League (CFL).

== College career ==
Henley was born on December 21, 1935, in Elgin, North Dakota. His family moved to Hayti, South Dakota when he was a child. Henley attended Huron College in South Dakota, where he was a Dean's List honors student and played as a running back from 1956 to 1959 on the varsity football team.

In 1959, Henley broke First Team NAIA All-America records with 394 points and more than 4,000 rushing yards.

== CFL career ==
Henley was drafted in 1960 by the NFL's Green Bay Packers in the 15th round (173rd overall). He was traded to the Hamilton Tiger-Cats in Ontario, Canada.

As a defensive back, Henley intercepted 59 passes for 916 yards and 5 touchdowns, and was selected as an All Star nine times. Following Henley's transition into an offensive player, he was an All Star for the 10th time in 1972 as a wide receiver. Henley won the CFL's Most Outstanding Player Award in 1972 in which the Tiger-Cats won the Grey Cup at their home field, Ivor Wynne Stadium, in Hamilton, Ontario. In 2025, his number 26 was retired by the Tiger-Cats.

He played in 7 Grey Cup games, winning 4: the 51st Grey Cup of 1963, the 53rd Grey Cup of 1965 (the so-called 'Wind Bowl'), the 55th Grey Cup of 1967, and the 60th Grey Cup of 1972, losing 3: the 49th Grey Cup of 1961, the 50th Grey Cup of 1962, and the 52nd Grey Cup of 1964.

== Post-football career ==
While still playing football in Hamilton, Henley was hired at the University of Guelph by athletic director Bill Mitchell. Henley served as the assistant athletic director, advisor to the football team and taught in the Physical Education program. He also took over the Gryphon Basketball program. In 1973–74, Henley coached the team to its first CIAU national championship.

Henley became the athletic director and coach at Mount Allison University in New Brunswick, and Brock University in Ontario. From 1989 to 1993, Henley was hired as defense coach with the Hamilton Tiger-Cats. He coached the Tiger-Cats to the 1989 Grey Cup, losing to the Saskatchewan Roughriders 40-43. From 1995 to 1996, he served as the Director of Football Operations for the Ottawa Rough Riders, where his teams had a combined 6–30 record. In 1996, Henley moved back to his home state of South Dakota after 36 years in Canada. He finished his career as an athletic director at his alma mater, Huron University. After Huron University closed, Henley became General Manager for Professional Transportation Inc., transporting railroad engineers and conductors. He retired in 2013.

Henley was inducted into the Canadian Football Hall of Fame in 1979, the University of Guelph Athletics Hall of Fame on October 4, 1985, the College Football Hall of Fame in 2004, and the Ontario Sports Hall of Fame in 2015. Henley was voted the sixth greatest CFL player in a poll conducted by Canadian sports network TSN in 2006.
