= Willie Bethea =

American football player (1938–2024)

Profile
- Positions: Halfback, Fullback

Personal information
- Born: July 21, 1938; Trenton, New Jersey, U.S.
- Died: January 5, 2024 (aged 85)
- Listed height: 6 ft 0 in (1.83 m)
- Listed weight: 190 lb (86 kg)

Career information
- College: Rider

Career history
- 1963–1970: Hamilton Tiger-Cats

Awards and highlights
- 3× Grey Cup champion (1963, 1965, 1967); CFL East All-Star (1967)

Willie Bethea (July 21, 1938 – January 5, 2024) was an American professional football player who was a running back for the Hamilton Tiger-Cats of the Canadian Football League (CFL). He won the Grey Cup with them in 1963, 1965 and 1967.

Bethea was born in Trenton, New Jersey, on July 21, 1938, He was an All-American in football in high school, and attended Rider College on a scholarship to play basketball. They did not have a football team. Bethea played semi-pro football with the Paterson Miners, and secured a trial with the National Football League's Baltimore Colts in 1962. He joined Hamilton in 1963.

Bethea was inducted into the Tiger-Cats Wall of Honour in 2012. He died on January 5, 2024, at the age of 85.
