= Chet Miksza =

Canadian football player

Profile
- Position: Center

Personal information
- Born: November 28, 1930; Hamilton, Ontario, Canada
- Died: October 29, 1975 (aged 44); Welland, Ontario, Canada
- Listed height: 6 ft 2 in (1.88 m)
- Listed weight: 238 lb (108 kg)

Career history
- 1952–1965: Hamilton Tiger-Cats
- 1966: Montreal Alouettes
- 1968: Hamilton Tiger-Cats

Awards and highlights
- 4× Grey Cup champion (1953, 1957, 1963, 1965); CFL All-Star (1964); CFL East All-Star (1964)

Chet Miksza (November 28, 1930 – October 29, 1975) was a centre for the Hamilton Tiger-Cats of the Canadian Football League from 1952 to 1968.
