= 2000 Montreal Alouettes season =

Canadian football team season

- Head coach: Charlie Taaffe
- Home stadium: Molson Stadium

Results
- Record: 12–6
- Division place: 1st, East
- Playoffs: Lost Grey Cup

Uniform

The 2000 Montreal Alouettes finished in first place in the East Division with a 12–6 record. This was Anthony Calvillo's first season as the full-time starter, and he didn't disappoint, having an allstar year, first leading his team to the Grey Cup, by beating the Winnipeg Blue Bombers 35–24 in the East Final, as they appeared in the Grey Cup for the first time since 1979, but lost to the BC Lions, who were led by Damon Allen. Overall it was a great year for the Alouettes, even if they lost the Grey Cup.

== Offseason ==
=== CFL draft ===
Round	Pick	Player	Position	School/Club team
2	12	Mat Petz	DE	Wake Forest
3	16	Morgan Kane	RB	Wake Forest
3	19	Jason Gavadza	TE	Kent St.
4	27	Harvey Stables	WR	Wilfrid Laurier
5	35	Ian Hewitt	K/P	Minot State
6	43	Andre Clark	DB	SE Missouri State

== Preseason ==
Week	Date	Opponent	Venue	Score	Result	Attendance	Record
A	June 17	Toronto Argonauts	SkyDome	13–13 (*)	Tie	10,077	0–0–1
B	June 27	Hamilton Tiger-Cats	Molson Stadium	43–33	Win	16,688	1–0–1

- * The Alouettes won this game in a pre-planned demonstration of the CFL's new overtime format 19–16.

== Regular season ==
=== Season standings ===
East Division
Pos	Team	Pld	W	L	T	OTL	PF	PA	PD	Pts
1	Montreal Alouettes (C, Q)	18	12	6	0	0	594	379	+215	24
2	Hamilton Tiger-Cats (Q)	18	9	7	0	2	470	446	+24	20
3	Winnipeg Blue Bombers (Q)	18	7	9	1	1	539	596	−57	16
4	Toronto Argonauts	18	7	10	1	0	390	562	−172	15

Source: "CFL.ca". Archived from the original on 2009-06-29.
(C) First round bye; (Q) Qualified for playoffs

=== Season schedule ===
Week	Date	Opponent	Venue	Score	Result	Attendance	Record	Streak
1	July 5	Winnipeg Blue Bombers	Molson Stadium	38–22	Win	19,461	1–0	W1
2	July 11	Toronto Argonauts	SkyDome	45–6	Win	20,612	2–0	W2
3	July 20	Toronto Argonauts	Molson Stadium	41–4	Win	19,461	3–0	W3
4	July 28	Winnipeg Blue Bombers	Winnipeg Stadium	33–31	Win	24,111	4–0	W4
5	Aug 3	Saskatchewan Roughriders	Molson Stadium	62–7	Win	19,461	5–0	W5
6	Aug 11	Edmonton Eskimos	Commonwealth Stadium	29–7	Loss	31,472	5–1	L1
7	Aug 18	Hamilton Tiger-Cats	Ivor Wynne Stadium	37–26	Loss	20,720	5–2	L2
8	Aug 25	Calgary Stampeders	Molson Stadium	48–13	Win	19,461	6–2	W1
9	Aug 31	BC Lions	BC Place Stadium	35–25	Win	19,621	7–2	W2
10	Sept 10	Hamilton Tiger-Cats	Molson Stadium	15–9	Loss	19,461	7–3	L1
11	Sept 16	Winnipeg Blue Bombers	Winnipeg Stadium	30–27	Loss	22,917	7–4	L2
12	Sept 24	BC Lions	Molson Stadium	29–28	Win	19,461	8–4	W1
13	Sept 30	Hamilton Tiger-Cats	Ivor Wynne Stadium	32–16	Win	21,212	9–4	W2
14	Oct 9	Edmonton Eskimos	Molson Stadium	45–15	Win	19,461	10–4	W3
15	Oct 15	Winnipeg Blue Bombers	Molson Stadium	36–30	Win	19,461	11–4	W4
16	Oct 22	Saskatchewan Roughriders	Taylor Field	39–22	Win	27,138	12–4	W5
17	Oct 29	Calgary Stampeders	McMahon Stadium	32–31	Loss	45,010	12–5	L1
18	Nov 5	Toronto Argonauts	Molson Stadium	17–11	Loss	19,461	12–6	L2

== Roster ==
2000 Montreal Alouettes final roster
Quarterbacks: 13 Anthony Calvillo; 14 Dan Gonzalez; 5 Stanley Jackson; Running backs: 4 Thomas Haskins; 33 Bruno Heppell; 20 Darren Joseph; 27 Mike Pringle; Receivers: 88 Kevin Alexander; 87 André Bolduc; 86 Ben Cahoon; 82 Jock Climie; 84 Tyree Davis; 3 Sylvain Girard	Offensive linemen: 68 Bryan Chiu C; 62 Scott Flory G; 66 Neal Fort T; 65 Kevin Lefsrud C/G; 53 Uzooma Okeke T; 65 Mike Sutherland G/T; 59 Pierre Vercheval G; Defensive linemen: 90 Swift Burch DE; 34 Tim Fleiszer DE; 91 Mat Petz DE; 58 Selvesta Miller DE; 75 Ed Philion DT; 93 Jason Richards DT	Linebackers: 51 Sheldon Benoit; 7 Tracy Gravely; 47 Stefen Reid; Defensive backs: 24 Dwight Henry; 31 Barron Miles; 29 Eric Riddick; 37 Alphonso Roundtree; 2 Davis Sanchez; 21 Irvin Smith; 36 Les Smith; 23 Mark Washington; 1 Kelly Wiltshire; Special teams: 10 Terry Baker K/P	Injured list: 6 Jamie Barnette QB; 17 Alfonzo Browning SB; 98 Steve Charbonneau DT; 69 Tito Hannah DE; 55 Chris Hoople LB; 18 Will Loftus DB; 53 Myron Newsome LB; 11 Winston October DB; Suspended: Keith Crawford DB; David Miller-Johnston K/P; Eric Smith WR; Italics indicate American player

== Playoffs ==
=== East Final ===
Team	Q1	Q2	Q3	Q4	Total
Winnipeg Blue Bombers	13	3	1	7	24
Montreal Alouettes	0	15	13	7	35

=== Grey Cup ===
Team	Q1	Q2	Q3	Q4	Total
Montreal Alouettes	3	0	7	16	26
BC Lions	8	4	0	16	28

== Awards ==
=== 2000 CFL All-Star Selections ===
- Bryan Chiu – Centre
- Barron Miles – Defensive Back
- Mike Pringle – Running Back
- Davis Sanchez – Cornerback
- Pierre Vercheval – Offensive Guard

=== 2000 CFL Eastern All-Star Selections ===
- Anthony Calvillo – Quarterback
- Ben Cahoon – Slotback
- Mike pringle – Running Back
- Pierre vercheval – Offensive Guard
- Bryan chiu – Centre
- Swift Birch – Defensive End
- Irvin Smith – Cornerback
- Davis sanchez – Cornerback
- Barron miles – Defensive Back
- Lester Smith – Defensive Safety
