= Don Sutherin =

American gridiron football player (1936–2022)

No. 22, 26, 20, 23, 14, 12
- Positions: Defensive back, Placekicker

Personal information
- Born: February 29, 1936; Empire, Ohio, U.S.
- Died: January 11, 2022 (aged 85); Canton, Ohio, U.S.
- Listed height: 5 ft 10 in (1.78 m)
- Listed weight: 193 lb (88 kg)

Career information
- High school: Toronto (Toronto, Ohio)
- College: Ohio State (1954–1957)
- NFL draft: 1958: 8th round, 94th overall pick

Career history

Playing
- Hamilton Tiger-Cats (1958); New York Giants (1959); Pittsburgh Steelers (1959–1960); Hamilton Tiger-Cats (1960–1966); Ottawa Rough Riders (1967–1969); Toronto Argonauts (1970)

Coaching
- Ottawa Rough Riders (1981) Defensive line coach; Ottawa Rough Riders (1982–1984) Defensive backfield coach; Edmonton Eskimos (1985–1990) Defensive secondary coach; Montreal Machine (1991) Defensive coordinator / defensive backs coach; Calgary Stampeders (1992–1993) Defensive backfield coach; Hamilton Tiger-Cats (1994) Defensive coordinator / defensive backs coach; Hamilton Tiger-Cats (1994–1997) Head coach; Hamilton Tiger-Cats (1998–2002) Defensive coordinator

Awards and highlights
- As player: 4× Grey Cup champion (1963, 1965, 1968, 1969); 3× CFL All-Star (1962, 1964, 1969); 6× CFL East All-Star (1961, 1962, 1964, 1965, 1968, 1969); National champion (1957); As coach: 3× Grey Cup champion (1987, 1992, 1999)

Career NFL statistics
- Interceptions: 1
- Kick/punt return yards: 293
- Stats at Pro Football Reference

Head coaching record
- Career: CFL: 20–34 (.370)
- Canadian Football Hall of Fame

Donald Paul "Suds" Sutherin (February 29, 1936 – January 11, 2022) was an American professional football player who was a defensive back and placekicker in the Canadian Football League (CFL) and National Football League (NFL). He is a member of the Canadian Football Hall of Fame (1992).

== Playing career ==
Sutherin played college football at Ohio State, and kicked the game-winning field goal in the 1958 Rose Bowl, giving Ohio State its third national championship. He was drafted by the New York Giants in the eighth round of the 1959 NFL draft and played in the NFL from 1959-1960 for the Giants and the Pittsburgh Steelers.

Sutherin started his playing career with Hamilton Tiger-Cats in 1958. After playing in the NFL, he returned to Hamilton in 1960, where he would play seven more seasons. He played for the Ottawa Rough Riders from 1967–1969 and the Toronto Argonauts in 1970. For Hamilton, his highest number of interceptions was 11 in 1961, 8 in 1962, and 6 in 1964 and for Toronto, 10 in 1969, for a total of 58 interceptions and 3 touchdowns. He spent a total of 12 years as a player in the CFL and played in eight Grey Cups, winning four.

While with the Tiger-Cats, he was noted for being both a defensive back as well as a placekicker and he led the CFL in points for several years.

Sutherin was honoured on the Hamilton Tiger-Cats' Wall of Fame at Ivor Wynne Stadium on October 24, 2008.

== Coaching career ==
After his playing career, Don Sutherin was an assistant coach with the Edmonton Eskimos from 1985 to 1990, the Calgary Stampeders from 1992 to 1994, and the Hamilton Tiger-Cats from 1994 to 2002. He was promoted to head coach of the Hamilton Tiger-Cats in 1994 and remained in that role until 1997.

== Personal life and death ==
Sutherin died from complications of COVID-19 in Canton, Ohio, on January 11, 2022, at the age of 85. He was survived by his wife, Nancy and their four daughters.

== CFL coaching record ==
Team	Year	Regular season					Postseason		
Team	Year	Won	Lost	Ties	Win %	Finish	Won	Lost	Result
HAM	1994	3	9	0	.250	5th in East Division	-	-	Failed to Qualify
HAM	1995	8	10	0	.444	4th in North Division	0	1	Lost in North Semi-Final
HAM	1996	8	10	0	.444	3rd in East Division	0	1	Lost in East Semi-Final
HAM	1997	1	5	0	.167	4th in East Division	-	-	Fired mid-season
Total		20	34	0	.370	0 Division; Championships	0	2	0 Grey Cups
