= Tommy Joe Coffey =

American-Canadian football player (1936–2020)

No. 75
- Positions: Offensive end, wide receiver, placekicker

Personal information
- Born: November 18, 1936; Texas, U.S.
- Died: August 25, 2020 (aged 83); Hamilton, Ontario, Canada
- Listed height: 6 ft 0 in (1.83 m)
- Listed weight: 196 lb (89 kg)

Career information
- College: West Texas State
- NFL draft: 1959: 8th round, 96th overall pick

Career history
- 1959–1966: Edmonton Eskimos
- 1967–1972: Hamilton Tiger-Cats
- 1973: Toronto Argonauts

Awards and highlights
- 2× Grey Cup champion (1967, 1972); Dave Dryburgh Memorial Trophy (1962); 7× CFL All-Star (1962, 1964–1968, 1970); 3× CFL East All-Star (1967, 1968, 1970); 4× CFL West All-Star (1962, 1964, 1965, 1966); Edmonton Eskimos Wall of Honour (1988); Hamilton Tiger-Cats Wall of Honour (1999)
- Canadian Football Hall of Fame (Class of 1977)

Tommy Joe Coffey (November 18, 1936 – August 25, 2020) was a Canadian-American professional football player who was an end, (Note: An offensive lineman who was an eligible receiver, a position which was phased out over the early 1960s) wide receiver and place kicker for the Edmonton Eskimos, Hamilton Tiger-Cats and Toronto Argonauts of the Canadian Football League (CFL).

== Professional career ==
In his 14-year career, Coffey caught 650 passes for a total of 10,320 yards and 63 touchdowns. He surpassed 1,000 yards receiving 4 times: 1963 to 1965 and 1969, his most prolific year being 1965 with 81 receptions for 1,286 yards. His best touchdown totals were 1962 and 1969 with 11, his best point totals 1969 with 148 points and 1962 with 129. He was replaced as the Tiger Cat place kicker by Ian Sunter after the 1971 season, hitting only 11 of 27 field goal attempts. He also played some defense in his first two years, recording three interceptions in 1959 and one in 1960.

Coffey was a member of two Grey Cup winning teams, in 1967 and 1972, both with Hamilton against the Saskatchewan Roughriders, especially during the 1967 season, catching 42 passes for 683 yards (16.3 yards/catch) and 5 touchdowns and hitting 18 of 27 field goal attempts for a total of 107 points. In the 55th Grey Cup (1967) game, he scored three points as a kicker (two converts and one rouge after a missed field goal). In the 1967–1972 span with Hamilton, he scored 603 points, third on their all-time list, see Hamilton Tiger-Cats all-time records and statistics.

== Awards ==
Coffey won the Dave Dryburgh Memorial Trophy as the top scorer in the 1962 CFL season. He was a seven-time CFL All-Star, four times as an Edmonton Eskimo and three times as a Hamilton Tiger-Cat; both teams have added him to their Walls of Honour.

He was elected into the Canadian Football Hall of Fame in 1977. In November 2006, Coffey was voted as #27 on a list of the CFL's top 50 players since 1945, in a poll conducted by Canadian sports network TSN.

== Personal life ==
In 1968 Coffey's Tiger-Cat helmet was stolen, and traded for some table time at a Hamilton pool hall. Forty-eight years later, in November 2015, Coffey was reunited with his stolen helmet.

Coffey, who lived in Burlington, Ontario, with his wife Joan, died from lung cancer on August 25, 2020, at St. Peter's Hospital in neighbouring Hamilton.
