= Peter Neumann (Canadian football) =

Canadian football player (1931–2020)

Profile
- Position: Defensive end

Personal information
- Born: December 31, 1931; St. Catharines, Ontario, Canada
- Died: January 1, 2020 (aged 88); St. Catharines, Ontario, Canada
- Listed height: 5 ft 11 in (1.80 m)
- Listed weight: 215 lb (98 kg)

Career history
- 1951–1964: Hamilton Tiger-Cats

Awards and highlights
- 3× Grey Cup champion (1953, 1957, 1963); CFL All-Star (1964); 9× CFL East All-Star (1953–1959, 1961, 1964)
- Canadian Football Hall of Fame (Class of 1979)

Peter Michael Neumann (December 31, 1931 – January 1, 2020) was a Canadian Football League (CFL) player for 14 seasons with the Hamilton Tiger-Cats.

He was a 9-time CFL Eastern All-Star and a part of three Grey Cup championship teams.

He died on January 1, 2020, the day after his 88th birthday.

He was buried at Victoria Lawn Cemetery in St. Catharines.
