= Seth Small =

American gridiron football player (born 1999)

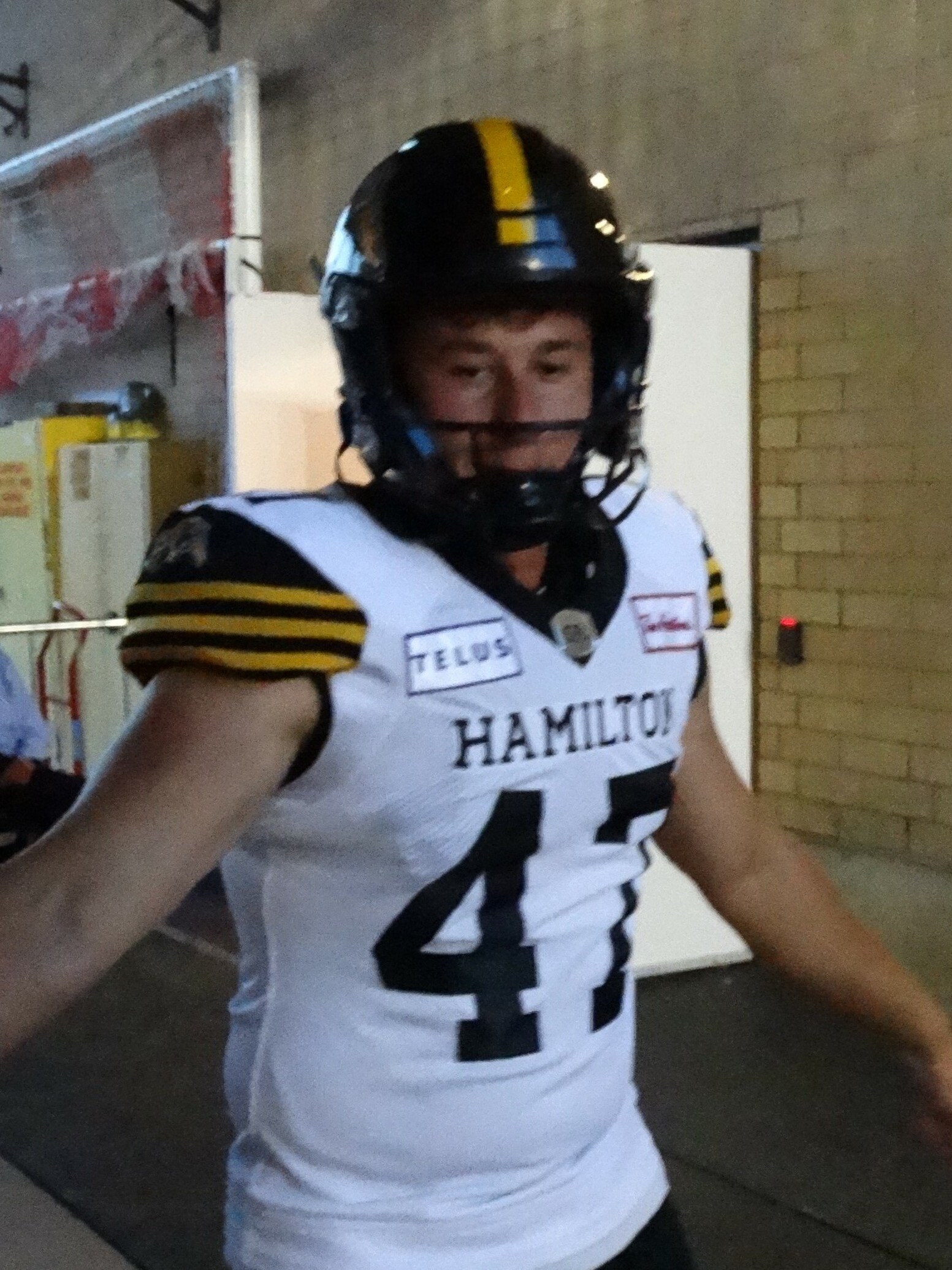
- Small with the Hamilton Tiger-Cats in 2021

No. 47
- Position: Placekicker

Personal information
- Born: October 29, 1999 (age 27); Katy, Texas, U.S.
- Listed height: 5 ft 11 in (1.80 m)
- Listed weight: 205 lb (93 kg)

Career information
- High school: Katy High
- College: Texas A&M

Career history
- 2022–2023: Hamilton Tiger-Cats

Awards and highlights
- CFL East All-Star (2022)
- Stats at CFL.ca

Seth Small (born October 29, 1999) is an American professional football placekicker. He previously played for the Hamilton Tiger-Cats of the Canadian Football League (CFL).

== College career ==
Small played college football for the Texas A&M Aggies from 2018 to 2021. In the 2021 season, he converted a game-winning field goal to defeat #1 Alabama 41–38. He played in 46 games where he was successful on 71 of 91 field goal attempts for a 78.0% completion rate and made a career long 52-yard field goal in his freshman year.

== Professional career ==
Following his collegiate career, Small was not selected in the 2021 NFL draft. He attended local camp with the Houston Texans and was invited to mini-camp with the Indianapolis Colts, but he was not offered a contract. He then signed with the Hamilton Tiger-Cats on May 26. Small played in both preseason games where he made all three field goal attempts, including a 51-yard try, but was released with the final cuts on June 5, 2022. After the team's incumbent kicker, Michael Domagala, struggled to begin the 2022 season, Small signed again with the team on July 10.

Small made his professional debut on July 16, against the Ottawa Redblacks, where he was successful on his only field goal attempt of 28 yards and made all three convert attempts. On August 26, he kicked a 58-yard field goal, against the Toronto Argonauts, which tied a franchise record for longest field goal made, and ended the year with the franchise record for the best accuracy percentage (90.7%) in Tiger-Cat history.

On May 14, 2023, the Tiger-Cats placed Small on the suspended list. He was activated on June 5. Small made one 31–yard field goal for the team in Week 1, but was placed back on the suspended list on June 17 and replaced by Marc Liegghio.

== Personal life ==
Small was born to parents Jennie Ann and Ricardo Small and has three sisters, Emma, Isabella and Della Grace. He married his wife, Rachel, in July 2021.
