= 2000 Toronto Argonauts season =

CFL team season

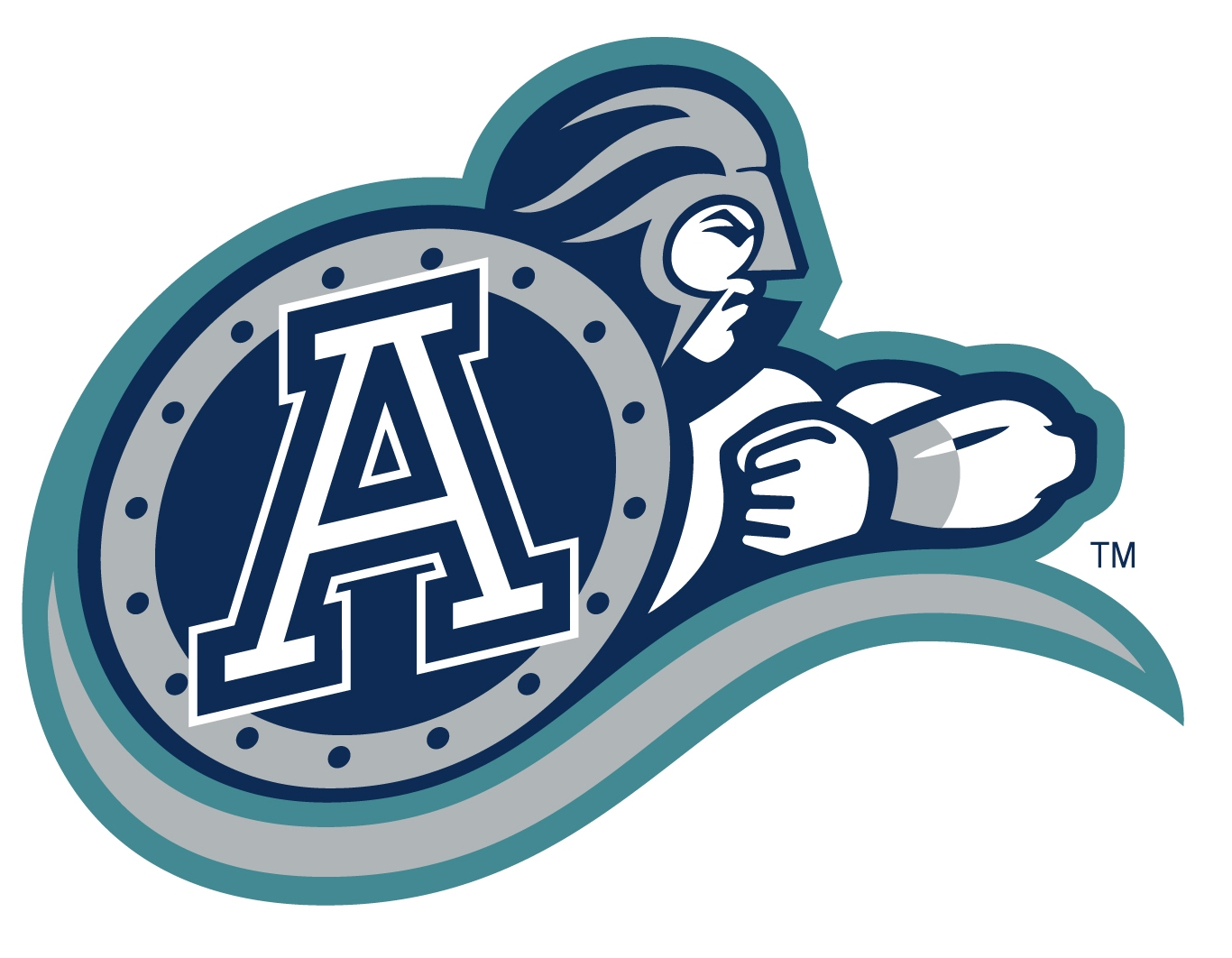
- General manager: J.I. Albrecht (7–10–1)
- Head coach: John Huard (1–6–1); Michael "Pinball" Clemons (6–4)
- Home stadium: SkyDome

Results
- Record: 7–10–1
- Division place: 4th, East
- Playoffs: did not qualify

The 2000 Toronto Argonauts finished in fourth place in the East Division of the 2000 CFL season with a 7–10–1 record and failed to qualify for the playoffs.

== Offseason ==
=== CFL draft ===
Rd	Pick	Player	Position	School
1	4	Donnavan Carter	S	Northern Illinois
2	11	Richard Clarke	WR	Weber State
3	18	Carson Souter	K	Montana State
4	24	Benoit Meloche	LB	Laval
4	26	Kojo Millington	DE	Wilfrid Laurier
5	34	Brad Coutts	WR	British Columbia
6	42	Jean-Vincent Posy-Audette	DB	Laval

=== Preseason ===
Week	Date	Opponent	Location	Final score	Attendance	Record
A	June 17 †	Alouettes	SkyDome	L 19 – 13 (OT)	10,077	0–0–1
B	June 27	@ Blue Bombers	Canad Inns Stadium	L 59 – 13	19,108	0–0–2

- † The CFL had scheduled a demonstration of the league's new overtime format following the game regardless of whether the score necessitated it.

== Regular season ==
=== Season standings ===
East Division
Pos	Team	Pld	W	L	T	OTL	PF	PA	PD	Pts
1	Montreal Alouettes (C, Q)	18	12	6	0	0	594	379	+215	24
2	Hamilton Tiger-Cats (Q)	18	9	7	0	2	470	446	+24	20
3	Winnipeg Blue Bombers (Q)	18	7	9	1	1	539	596	−57	16
4	Toronto Argonauts	18	7	10	1	0	390	562	−172	15

Source: "CFL.ca". Archived from the original on 2009-06-29.
(C) First round bye; (Q) Qualified for playoffs

=== Schedule ===
Week	Date	Opponent	Location	Final score	Attendance	Record	Streak
1	July 6	@ Roughriders	Taylor Field	W 36 – 28	20,995	1–0–0	W1
2	July 11	Alouettes	SkyDome	L 45 – 6	20,612	1–1–0	L1
3	July 20	@ Alouettes	Molson Stadium	L 41 – 4	19,461	1–2–0	L2
4	July 28	Tiger-Cats	SkyDome	L 23 – 17	15,345	1–3–0	L3
5	August 4	@ Stampeders	McMahon Stadium	L 37 – 17	33,783	1–4–0	L4
6	August 10	Blue Bombers	SkyDome	T 41 – 41 (4OT)	11,723	1–4–1	T1
7	August 17	@ Lions	BC Place Stadium	L 36 – 26	19,858	1–5–1	L1
8	August 24	Lions	SkyDome	L 51 – 4	11,350	1–6–1	L2
9	September 4	@ Tiger-Cats	Ivor Wynne Stadium	L 42 – 12	28,830	1–7–1	L3
10	September 9	@ Blue Bombers	Canad Inns Stadium	W 24 – 12	24,064	2–7–1	W1
11	September 15	Roughriders	SkyDome	L 44 – 17	28,724	2–8–1	L1
12	September 22	@ Eskimos	Commonwealth Stadium	W 34 – 21	28,649	3–8–1	W1
13	September 28	Stampeders	SkyDome	L 31 – 14	11,343	3–9–1	L1
14	October 7	Tiger-Cats	SkyDome	W 29 – 12	20,729	4–9–1	W1
15	October 13	@ Tiger-Cats	Ivor Wynne Stadium	W 32 – 8	19,632	5–9–1	W2
16	October 21	Eskimos	SkyDome	L 48 – 28	18,129	5–10–1	L1
17	October 27	Blue Bombers	SkyDome	W 32 – 31	18,473	6–10–1	W1
18	November 5	@ Alouettes	Molson Stadium	W 17 – 11	19,461	7–10–1	W2

== Postseason ==
Despite a late season run (6–4–0) under interim coach Michael "Pinball" Clemons, the Argonauts failed to qualify for the playoffs.

== Roster ==
2000 Toronto Argonauts final roster
Quarterbacks: 7 Jay Barker; 14 Kerwin Bell; 15 Jimmy Kemp; Running backs: 34 Tony Burse; 27 Mike Jenkins; 26 Morgan Welch; Receivers: 82 Eddie Brown; 83 Tyrone Brown; 8 Andrew English; 81 Andre Kirwan; 87 Derrell Mitchell; 85 Grayson Shillingford	Offensive linemen: 65 Sandy Annunziata C/G; 51 Samir Chahine G; 61 Jerry Crafts T; 64 Rohn Meyer G/T; 62 Dwayne Morgan T; 66 Jude St. John G; Defensive linemen: 89 Leroy Blugh DE; 70 Roger Dunbrack DE; 94 Fred Perry DE; 41 John Raposo DT; 91 Tyrone Rodgers DT; 72 Johnny Scott DT; Special teams: 4 Jacob Marini K; 1 Noel Prefontaine P/K	Linebackers: 24 Brendon Ayanbadejo; 35 Martavious Houston; 73 Calvin Tiggle; 59 Glen Young; Defensive backs: 10 Antonious Bonner; 16 Byron Capers; 2 Donnavan Carter; 3 Brad Elberg; 21 George Nimako; 36 Jean-Vincent Posy-Audette; 9 Wayne Shaw; 11 Marcello Simmons; 12 Adrion Smith	Injured list: 30 Paul Blackwood FB; 37 Orlando Bowen LB; 57 David De La Perralle T; 56 Chad Folk C; 32 James Jenkins FB; 67 Jung-Yul Kim T; 6 Éric Lapointe RB; 28 Errol Martin LB; 6 Vernon Mitchell DB; 63 Frank Rocca G; 68 Steve Salter G; 18 Oteman Sampson QB; 90 Terrance Simmons DT; -- Andrew Stewart DT; 33 Ryan Terry RB; Italics indicate International player

== Awards and records ==
=== 2000 CFL All-Stars ===
- SB – Derrell Mitchell
- P – Noel Prefontaine

=== Eastern Division All-Star Selections ===
- SB – Derrell Mitchell
- DT – Johnny Scott
- LB – Mike O'Shea
- LB – Calvin Tiggle
- P – Noel Prefontaine
