= Tony Akins (Canadian football) =

American gridiron football player (born 1977)

No. 81
- Positions: Wide receiver, Slotback

Personal information
- Born: May 10, 1977 (age 49); Starkville, Mississippi, US
- Listed height: 5 ft 9 in (1.75 m)
- Listed weight: 181 lb (82 kg)

Career information
- High school: Starkville HS
- College: Northeast Louisiana

Career history
- 1999: Buffalo Bills*
- 1999–2003: Hamilton Tiger-Cats
- * Offseason or practice squad member only

Awards and highlights
- Grey Cup champion (1999)

Anthony Royell Akins (born May 10, 1977) is an American former professional football player. A wide receiver and slotback, he played for the Hamilton Tiger-Cats of the Canadian Football League (CFL) from 1999 to 2003. He played in 61 regular season games, catching 121 receptions for 2,138 yards and 14 touchdowns. He also returned punts and kickoffs. Akins is a Grey Cup champion.

Akins played high school football at Starkville High School before playing at East Mississippi Community College. He later transferred to Eastern Louisiana University and played for the Warhawks. After going unselected in the 1999 NFL draft, Akins was signed by the Buffalo Bills of the National Football League but was cut before the beginning of the regular season. He was signed by the Hamilton Tiger-Cats shortly after and spent his first two seasons moving between the practice squad and the active roster, playing in 9 games each season and contributing heavily on special teams. Akins transitioned to a more offensive role in 2001, but his career was interrupted in later seasons by repeated injuries.

== Early career ==
Akins began playing high school football at Starkville High School as a freshman. Due to his small size, Akins rarely played. As a senior, he was ruled ineligible for academic reasons but continued practicing with the football team throughout the season. Akins was also able to participate on the track and field team, running sprints. After Akins impressed his high school football coach by practicing despite his ineligibility, the coach invited East Mississippi Community College to look at Akins. A representative of East Mississippi attended a track and field meet where Akins won the 100 metres and offered him a scholarship to play college football shortly afterward.

Akins went on to play at both East Mississippi and Northeast Louisiana University. In his first game at East Mississippi, Akins returned a punt 85 yards for a touchdown. Although Akins developed at East Mississippi and with the Northeast Louisiana Indians, he remained at least second on the depth chart, playing behind Quincy Jackson at East Mississippi and Marty Booker at Northeast Louisiana. Akins played with the Indians through 1998, when he featured as the team's kick returner and led his team with 1,269 all-purpose yards.

== Professional career ==
Akins declared for the 1999 NFL Draft, where he went unsigned. The Buffalo Bills later signed him to fill their final roster slot at wide receiver in training camp. In late August, they released Akins prior to the start of the regular season.

=== Hamilton Tiger-Cats ===
Within a week of being cut from the Bills, Akins was signed by the Hamilton Tiger-Cats to their practice squad. After Curtis Jackson was released from the Tiger-Cats, Akins was moved to the active roster to replace him as part of the punt and kick return rotation. On September 12, Akins made his CFL debut against the Montreal Alouettes, where he averaged 21 yards on kick returns. Akins was named Offensive Player of the Week for his performance in an October game against the Winnipeg Blue Bombers, where he caught eight passes for 257 yards and four touchdowns. In early November, he was named Special Teams Player of the Week after returning three kicks for over 100 yards. The Tiger-Cats won the 87th Grey Cup with Akins contributing four catches for 43 yards.

Akins returned to the Tiger-Cats for the 2000 season. In July, he returned a punt from Lui Passaglia 65 yards for a touchdown. In mid-September, Akins started in place of the injured Darren Flutie, but he was later moved to the practice squad in October. He returned for the final game of the regular season and returned a punt for his second 65-yard touchdown of the season. The Tiger-Cats lost the East Semi-Final 22–20 to the Winnipeg Blue Bombers after an offensive interference penalty was assessed on Akins in the final minutes of the game. The Hamilton Spectator described the penalty as "ill-deserved". Akins finished the season sixth in the CFL with 393 punt return yards. He was also the league leader in punt return touchdowns.

On December 12, 2000, the Tiger-Cats announced that they had re-signed Akins. Due to the CFL's import ratio requirements, Hamilton Spectator reporter Steve Milton speculated that Akins would be cut before the regular season. Instead, Akins made the regular season roster and regularly started at wide receiver for the first time in his career. Due to Akins' speed, he was moved to the slotback position in August. He later lost his starting position to wide receiver Corey Grant but continued to see regular playing time. Akins was held out of two games entirely near the end of the season to allow offensive lineman Gary Brown to return from the injured list. Akins' role as a receiver increased in the 2001 season, and he finished his season with 29 catches for 461 receiving yards. Conversely, his role as a kick and punt returner decreased substantially. Akins averaged 5.1 yards per punt return and 15.5 yards per kickoff return, decreasing from 10.3 yards and 24.0 yards in the 2000 season, respectively.

Akins became a free agent before the 2002 season. The Montreal Alouettes expressed interest in signing Akins, but he decided to re-sign with the Tiger-Cats in May shortly before a deadline imposed by head coach Ron Lancaster. In a pre-season game, Akins suffered a collarbone injury when a player's face mask was driven into his chest. He returned in mid-July. In his second game of the season, Akins scored three touchdowns. He scored in each of the two following games as well. Akins' success was interrupted in late August when he re-injured his collarbone with deep bruising. After Akins returned, he caught an 84-yard touchdown while accumulating 150 receiving yards against the Alouettes. The Hamilton Tiger-Cats did not qualify for the playoffs in 2002, but Akins had his most successful season, catching 38 receptions for 732 yards and 7 touchdowns. All three values were career-highs for the wide receiver.

Akins re-signed with the Tiger-Cats before the start of the 2003 season. He was moved around in various positions throughout the season. Before the beginning of the season, Akins was designated the starting slotback, but he quickly lost the job to Trevor Shaw. He was later moved back to his original position at wide receiver. After missing games due to leg and knee injuries, Akins finished the season with 482 receiving yards and two touchdowns.

In 2004, Akins was cut from the Tiger-Cats during the preseason after facing competition from seven import receivers and five Canadians.

=== Season statistics ===
			Receiving					Rushing					Punt returns					Kick returns					Misc		
Year	Team	GP	Rec	Yds	Avg	Long	TD	Att	Yds	Avg	Long	TD	PR	Yds	Avg	Long	TD	KR	Yds	Avg	Long	TD	Tkls	FUM	FR
1999	HAM	9	17	375	22.1	70	4	1	7	7.0	7	0	18	151	8.4	38	0	18	381	21.2	45	0	0	0	0
2000	HAM	9	7	88	12.6	20	0	1	−1	−1.0	−1	0	38	393	10.3	67	2	2	48	24.0	43	0	4	1	0
2001	HAM	16	29	461	15.9	55	1	1	7	7.0	7	0	35	178	5.1	16	0	4	62	15.5	23	0	0	1	1
2002	HAM	13	38	732	19.3	84	7	0	0	0.0	0	0	5	31	6.2	12	0	0	0	0.0	0	0	1	1	1
2003	HAM	14	30	482	16.1	56	2	0	0	0.0	0	0	0	0	0.0	0	0	0	0	0.0	0	0	0	0	0
Total		61	121	2,138	17.7	84	14	3	13	4.3	7	0	96	753	7.8	67	2	24	491	20.5	45	0	5	3	2

== Personal life ==
Akins is divorced and has four children.
