= Simoni Lawrence =

American football player (born 1989)

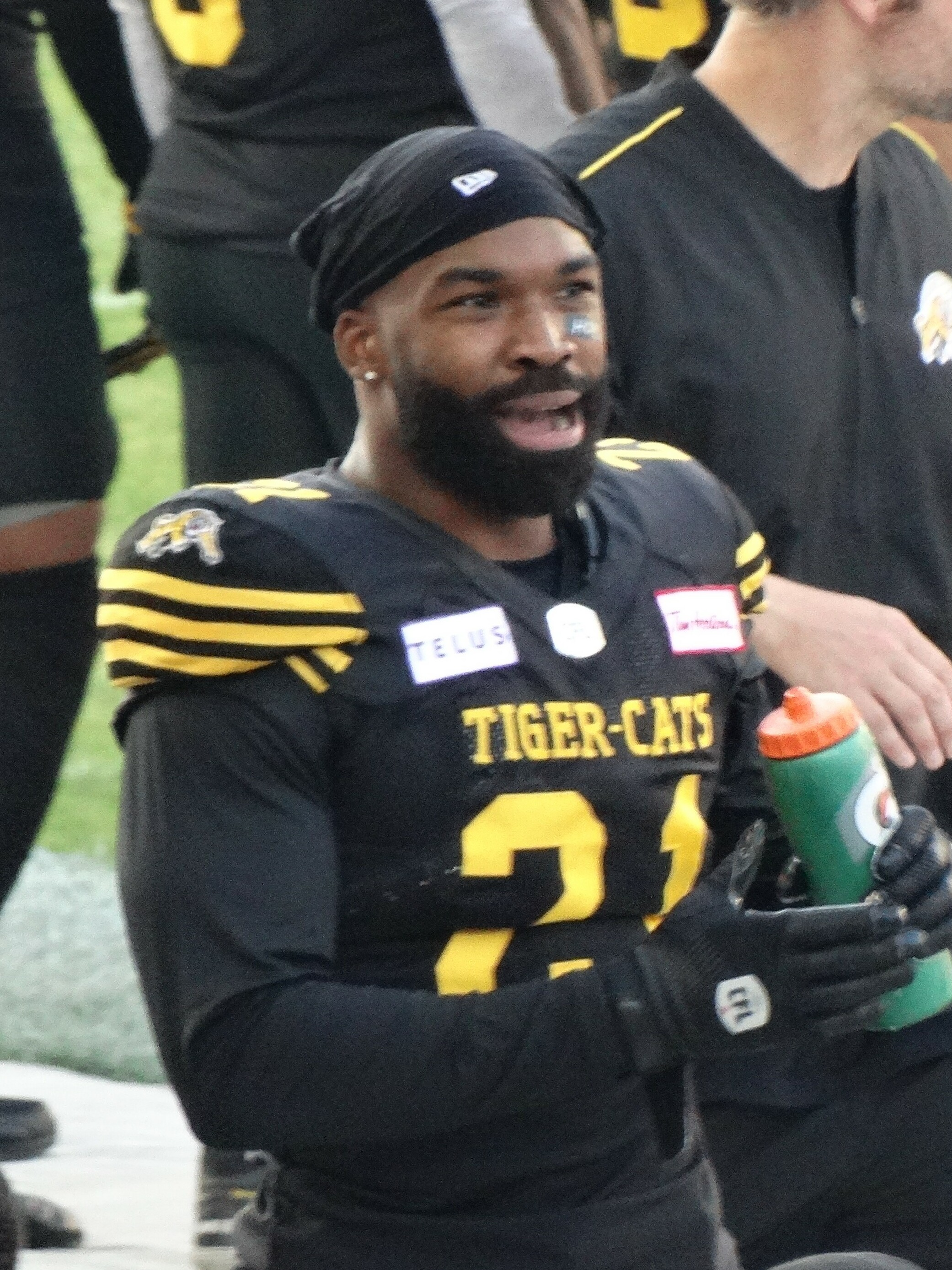
- Lawrence with the Hamilton Tiger-Cats in 2023

No. 21
- Position: Linebacker

Personal information
- Born: February 1, 1989 (age 37); Upper Darby Township, Pennsylvania, U.S.
- Listed height: 6 ft 1 in (1.85 m)
- Listed weight: 231 lb (105 kg)

Career information
- College: Minnesota

Career history
- 2010: St. Louis Rams*
- 2010: Philadelphia Eagles*
- 2010: Hartford Colonials
- 2010: Chicago Bears*
- 2010–2011: Tampa Bay Buccaneers*
- 2011: Las Vegas Locomotives
- 2012: Edmonton Eskimos
- 2013: Hamilton Tiger-Cats
- 2014: Minnesota Vikings*
- 2014–2023: Hamilton Tiger-Cats
- * Offseason or practice squad member only

Awards and highlights
- 3× James P. McCaffrey Trophy (2015, 2019, 2021); 3× CFL All-Star (2015, 2019, 2021); 5× CFL East All-Star (2014–2016, 2019, 2021)

Career CFL statistics
- Games played: 169
- Total tackles: 760
- Sacks: 35
- Interceptions: 15
- Forced fumbles: 13
- Stats at Pro Football Reference
- Stats at CFL.ca

Simoni Lawrence (born February 1, 1989) is an American former professional football player who was a linebacker in the Canadian Football League (CFL), primarily with the Hamilton Tiger-Cats. He was a three-time winner of the James P. McCaffrey Trophy, a three-time CFL All-Star, and a five-time CFL Divisional All-Star. He is the Tiger-Cats' franchise leader in total tackles (734) and defensive tackles (727) and holds the CFL record for most defensive tackles in a single game (17). He played college football for the Minnesota Golden Gophers.

== College career ==
Lawrence played college football at the University of Minnesota.

== Professional career ==
Pre-draft measurables
Height	Weight	Arm length	Hand span	40-yard dash	10-yard split	20-yard split	20-yard shuttle	Three-cone drill	Vertical jump	Broad jump	Bench press
6 ft 0 3/8 in (1.84 m)	232 lb (105 kg)	33 in (0.84 m)	9 5/8 in (0.24 m)	4.55 s	1.60 s	2.66 s	4.35 s	6.88 s	40.0 in (1.02 m)	10 ft 7 in (3.23 m)	21 reps

=== St. Louis Rams ===
Lawrence was signed by the St. Louis Rams as an undrafted free agent on April 26, 2010, but was released one month later.

=== Hartford Colonials/Philadelphia Eagles ===
Lawrence was then drafted by the Hartford Colonials 22nd overall in the 2010 UFL draft on June 2, 2010, but signed with the Philadelphia Eagles on June 8. He was part of the Eagles' final cuts on August 28 and joined the Colonials instead, playing in eight games for the team.

=== Chicago Bears ===
After the conclusion of the 2010 UFL season, he signed with the Chicago Bears on December 14, 2010, and spent three weeks on the team's practice roster.

=== Tampa Bay Buccaneers ===
He then joined the Tampa Bay Buccaneers on December 30, 2010, and participated in the team's training camp for the 2011 season. However, he was released on September 3, 2011.

=== Las Vegas Locomotives ===
Lawrence played in the UFL for the Las Vegas Locomotives in 2011.

=== Edmonton Eskimos ===
Lawrence signed with the Edmonton Eskimos of the Canadian Football League on January 10, 2012, playing in 15 games and starting one. Over the course of the season Lawrence contributed 15 tackles, 11 special teams tackles and one fumble recovery.

=== Hamilton Tiger-Cats (first stint) ===
During the following off-season, he was traded to the Hamilton Tiger-Cats with Greg Wojt and Jeremiah Masoli for Nathan Kanya and the rights to Carson Rockhill on February 5, 2013. In his first season with the Ticats Lawrence made an immediate impact, amassing 53 tackles, three special teams tackles, one quarterback sack, and three interceptions.

=== Minnesota Vikings ===
On February 10, 2014, Lawrence signed with the Minnesota Vikings. He was released on May 13, 2014.

=== Hamilton Tiger-Cats (second stint) ===
As a free-agent Lawrence signed with the Hamilton Tiger-Cats, agreeing to a three-year contract on June 1, 2014. In 2014, Lawrence played in 16 of the 18 regular season games, and both playoff games en route to the team's second consecutive trip to the Grey Cup (the Ti-Cats lost both championship appearances). He led the team in tackles in that season, with 78; while adding 3 sacks, 2 interceptions and 1 fumble recovery. Lawrence continued his stellar play into the 2015 season, accumulating 78 tackles, 5 sacks and 2 interceptions. His performance on the field was recognized when he was named a CFL All-Star. In his fourth season with the Ti-Cats Lawrence set a career-high with 89 tackles, while also contributing 4 sacks and 1 interception for a touchdown. On January 11, 2017, Lawrence and the Ti-Cats agreed to a two-year contract extension.

On February 11, 2019, Lawrence signed a two-year extension with the Tiger-Cats. Lawrence was suspended for two games by the CFL for his hit to the head of Saskatchewan Roughriders quarterback Zach Collaros in his team's 2019 season opener. During Week 14, Lawrence was fined by the CFL for unnecessary roughness, when he twisted Terry Williams' ankle. In Week 15, Lawrence was fined the maximum amount under the CBA for a late hit to the head of Eskimos quarterback Logan Kilgore. On September 30, 2019, Lawrence set a new CFL record for defensive tacles in a single game with 17 made, surpassing Reggie Hunt's previous record of 16. For the 2019 season, he played in 15 regular season games and led the league in defensive tackles with a career-high 98, to go along with three interceptions and four quarterback sacks. For his dominant season, he was named the East Division's Most Outstanding Defensive Player and a CFL All-Star.

Lawrence did not play in 2020 due to the cancellation of the 2020 CFL season. On January 19, 2021, it was announced that Lawrence had signed a contract extension with the Tiger-Cats. In a shortened 2021 season, he played in all 14 regular season games where he recorded 73 defensive tackles, four sacks, and three interceptions. He was then named a CFL All-Star and was named the East Division's Most Outstanding Defensive Player for the third time in his career. In the 108th Grey Cup, played in Hamilton, Lawrence had six defensive tackles, but the Tiger-Cats lost to the Winnipeg Blue Bombers.

In 2022, Lawrence sat out half the season due to injury, playing in just nine games where he recorded 41 defensive tackles. In the 2023 season, he played in all 18 regular season games where he had 84 defensive tackles, five sacks, one interception, and three forced fumbles. After becoming a free agent on February 13, 2024, Lawrence announced his retirement on February 15, 2024.
