= Mike Philbrick =

Canadian football player (born 1967)

No. 77
- Position: Defensive tackle

Personal information
- Born: October 23, 1967 (age 59); Hamilton, Ontario, Canada

Career information
- College: Carleton
- CFL draft: 1990: 4th round, 25th overall pick

Career history
- 1990: Ottawa Rough Riders
- 1994–2001: Hamilton Tiger-Cats

Awards and highlights
- Grey Cup champion (1999); 3× CFL East All-Star (1996, 2000, 2001)

Michael Philbrick (born October 22, 1967) is a Canadian former professional football defensive lineman in the Canadian Football League who played for the Ottawa Rough Riders and Hamilton Tiger-Cats. He played CIS football for the Carleton Ravens.
