= Tony Champion =

American gridiron football player (born 1963)

No. 87, 1
- Position: Wide receiver

Personal information
- Born: March 19, 1963 (age 63); Humboldt, Tennessee, U.S.

Career information
- High school: Humboldt
- College: Tennessee Martin

Career history
- 1985–1992: Hamilton Tiger-Cats

Awards and highlights
- Grey Cup champion (1986); Jeff Russel Memorial Trophy (1989); CFL All-Star (1989); CFL East All-Star (1989)

Tony Champion (born March 19, 1963) is an American former professional football wide receiver who played in the Canadian Football League (CFL).

== Early sports career ==
A multi-sport star, Champion lived up to his name as a football standout at the high school, college and pro level. A 1981 Humboldt grad, he was an all-district player on the Vikings' 1979 undefeated, 13-0 Class AA state champion football team. As a senior, he quarterbacked Humboldt to a 10-1 season and was selected All-West Tenn., 2nd Team All-State and Humboldt Player of the Year. In basketball Champion earned All-District and All-Region as Humboldt finished state runner-up. In track, he placed 4th in state in the 330 yd. low hurdles as a junior and qualified for the state as a senior, but elected to attend graduation instead of competing at the state meet.

== Football career ==
Playing football at the University of Tennessee at Martin (1981–84), Champion was All-Gulf South Conference, had 84 career points and tied a school record with a 100-yard kickoff return. As a junior, he surpassed 1,000 receiving yards and set school records for receptions in a season (39) and most yards single game (181 yards on 3 catches). He was a pre-season All-American before suffering knee injury as a senior.

Champion went undrafted in the NFL, but he signed as a free agent with the Dallas Cowboys, San Diego Chargers, and Green Bay Packers in the National Football League, and ended up being cut by all three teams.

He was a two time all-star (1986 and 1989) in the Canadian Football League, playing for the Hamilton Tiger-Cats for eight seasons from 1985 to 1992. He had 340 career receptions for 5,498 yards and 37 TD's. In 1989 Champion was runner-up for the CFL's Most Outstanding Player Award, Hamilton's Most Valuable Player, winner of the Jeff Russel Memorial Trophy, and set a team season record for touchdowns with 15 on the year.

Champion is remembered for his last minute touchdown catch in the 1989 Grey Cup game. With Hamilton trailing in the final minutes, Champion caught a 13-yard Mike Kerrigan pass deep in the end zone with 44 seconds remaining, tying the game at 40–40. Fully extended, he rolled over in mid-air to grab the ball in both hands and fell flat out on the ground, without dropping the ball. Champion was playing with broken ribs.

He won the 74th Grey Cup with the Hamilton Tiger-Cats in 1986.

== Professional football record ==
| Year | Team | Catches | Yards | Average | Long | TDs |
|---|---|---|---|---|---|---|
| 1985 | Ham | 13 | 203 | 15.6 | 67 | 1 |
| 1986 | Ham | 74 | 1216 | 16.4 | 75 | 6 |
| 1987 | Ham | 53 | 851 | 16.1 | 75 | 6 |
| 1988 | Ham | 16 | 270 | 16.9 | 42 | 1 |
| 1989 | Ham | 95 | 1656 | 17.4 | 83 | 15 |
| 1990 | Ham | 37 | 581 | 15.7 | 75 | 5 |
| 1991 | Ham | 45 | 545 | 12.1 | 26 | 2 |
| 1992 | Ham | 7 | 176 | 25.1 | 75 | 1 |

== After football ==
Champion was somewhat bitter when he left the CFL in 1992. This was evidenced as early as the 1989 Grey Cup game, where in a post game interview he proclaimed: "You've seen the last of Tony Champion." While not correct, this was a manifestation of his belief that he was not fully appreciated or compensated. Although bitter toward the end of his playing career, he eventually made his return to Hamilton more than 20 years after his playing career ended for a Hamilton Tiger-Cats playoff game at Tim Hortons Field, the 2015 East Division Semi-Final. The Tiger-Cats would go on to win that game 25–22.
