= Mike Kerrigan =

American football player and coach (born 1960)

No. 19, 2, 12, 14
- Position: Quarterback

Personal information
- Born: April 27, 1960 (age 66); Chicago, Illinois, U.S.
- Listed height: 6 ft 3 in (1.91 m)
- Listed weight: 205 lb (93 kg)

Career information
- High school: Mount Carmel (Chicago)
- College: Northwestern
- NFL draft: 1982: undrafted

Career history

Playing
- New England Patriots (1982–1984); Hamilton Tiger-Cats (1986–1991); Toronto Argonauts (1992–1994); Hamilton Tiger-Cats (1995–1996)

Coaching
- Hamilton Tiger-Cats (1996) Quarterbacks Coach

Awards and highlights
- Grey Cup champion (1986); Grey Cup Most Valuable Player (1986); 2× CFL East All Star (1986, 1989)

Career NFL statistics
- Games played: 2
- Stats at Pro Football Reference

Michael Joseph Kerrigan (born April 27, 1960) is an American former professional football player who was a quarterback in the National Football League (NFL) and Canadian Football League (CFL). He played college football for the Northwestern Wildcats.

== Amateur career ==
Kerrigan played high school football at Mt. Carmel High School in Chicago. He was recruited by Yale, Weber State, and Utah, but opted to attend Northwestern as a walk-on. After sitting his entire freshman season, Kerrigan became the team's starting quarterback the second game of his sophomore season. In his first ever college game, Kerrigan led Northwestern to a 27–22 victory over Wyoming. Kerrigan was awarded a scholarship following the game. This would be the only victory for Kerrigan in his college career as the Wildcats lost their next 32 games – an NCAA Division I record. As he did not play his freshman year, Kerrigan was eligible to return for the 1982 season, however coach Dennis Green wanted to go in a different direction at quarterback, so Kerrigan opted to try professional football. In his three seasons as Northwestern's quarterback, Kerrigan attempted 379 of 797 passes for 4094 yards, and threw 23 touchdowns and 47 interceptions. He set Northwestern's single-season records for completions (173) and passing yards (1816) during his junior year.

== Professional career ==
=== New England Patriots ===
Kerrigan went undrafted in 1982, however, at the urging of director of player development Dick Steinberg, the New England Patriots signed Kerrigan as an undrafted free agent. He beat out Steve Sandon and Lou Pagley for the third-string quarterback position. He made the team again in 1983 and saw his first professional action on December 19, 1983, replacing Tony Eason during the fourth quarter of the season finale against the Seattle Seahawks. He went 6 for 14 for 72 yards with an interception and rushed once for 14 yards in a 24–6 loss. He was cut following the 1984 preseason and tried out for the Los Angeles Rams and the Edmonton Eskimos before returning to the Patriots following an injury to Eason. When Eason returned three weeks later, Kerrigan was released again. When Raymond Berry took over as head coach later that season, he decided to add a third quarterback and brought back Kerrigan. Kerrigan appeared in one game versus Indianapolis, completing one pass for 13 yards, leading the offense on a fourth-quarter touchdown drive. He was released by the Patriots on June 20, 1985.

=== Hamilton Tiger-Cats ===
In 1986, Kerrigan signed with the Hamilton Tiger-Cats and competed with Tom Porras, Mark Casale, and Wilson Fraylon for the backup quarterback job. He won the second-string job and replaced Ken Hobart as starter in the team's fifth game of the year. He was named an Eastern Division All-Star by the Football Reporters of Canada and led the Ti-Cats to a 39–15 upset victory over the 12-point favourite Edmonton Eskimos in the 74th Grey Cup. He was named the game's most valuable offensive player. It was Hamilton's first Grey Cup title since 1972, and their first win over Edmonton since 1977. Both Kerrigan and Hobart missed much of the 1987 due to injury, which led to Tom Porras receiving most of the playing time that year. Kerrigan entered the 1988 season in a competition with Hobart, Porras, and rookie Terry Andrysiak. The Ti-Cats opted to release Hobart and have Kerrigan and Porras split time as starter. On October 1, Kerrigan separated his shoulder and missed the rest of the season. Although he missed the last six games, Kerrigan finished fourth in the league in passing yards (2,764) and second in completion percentage (55%). The team struggled without Kerrigan and Porras was released after the season, which allowed Kerrigan to enter the 1989 season without competition for the starting job. He completed 248 of 486 passes for 3,635 yards and 20 touchdowns, ranking him fourth among CFL quarterbacks. He again led the Tiger-Cats to the league championship. In the 77th Grey Cup, he completed 23 of 35 passes for 303 yards and tied the game with 34 seconds left with a touchdown pass to Tony Champion. However, the Saskatchewan Roughriders won the game 43–40 on a last second field goal. Kerrigan struggled in 1990 and was benched in favor of backup Todd Dillon shortly into the 1991 season. On May 9, 1992, The Tiger-Cats signed Damon Allen, ending Kerrigan's first stint in Hamilton.

=== Toronto Argonauts ===
On June 4, 1992, Kerrigan signed with the Toronto Argonauts. He was signed by Toronto general manager Mike McCarthy, who had also brought Kerrigan to Hamilton when he was the Tiger-Cats director of player personnel. Kerrigan began the season as a third-string quarterback behind Rickey Foggie and John Congemi. On August 27, Kerrigan came off the bench to lead Toronto to a 24 to 16 comeback victory over the Ottawa Rough Riders. He threw a 43-yard touchdown pass to Darrell K. Smith put the Argonauts ahead by one point with a minute left in the fourth quarter. Kerrigan made his first start for the Argonauts in the following week's Labour Day Classic. It was Kerrigan's first game at Ivor Wynne Stadium since leaving the Tiger-Cats. Hamilton won the game 27 to 24, with Kerrigan throwing an interception that set up the game-winning touchdown. Kerrigan returned to the bench the following week due to a strained knee tendon. In 1993, the Argonauts brought in Tracy Ham to be the starter and Kerrigan beat out Chris Flynn for the backup job. On July 28, Kerrigan completed 13 of 20 passes for 279 yards and three touchdowns in relief of Ham in a 39 to 36 loss to the Calgary Stampeders, which led to Kerrigan taking over as starter. Kerrigan started three games before missing the rest of the season with a broken collarbone. Kerrigan was brought back in 1994 and won the starting job. Kerrigan started six games before being benched in favor of Reggie Slack. Slack started the next two games before coach Bob O'Billovich decided to return Kerrigan to the starting role. In his return as starter, Kerrigan led Toronto their first Labour Day victory over Hamilton in seven years. Kerrigan made one more start before another collarbone injury ended his season. On April 24, 1995, Kerrigan was released by the Argonauts after they acquired Kent Austin via trade.

=== Return to the Tiger-Cats ===
On May 3, 1995, Kerrigan signed with the Tiger-Cats. He spent the year as the third string QB behind Anthony Calvillo and Steve Taylor. In the team's playoff game against the Calgary Stampeders, Kerrigan came off the bench and completed 23 of 36 for 244 yards and a touchdown. Kerrigan was waived by the Ti-Cats on May 29, 1996. On August 12, Kerrigan returned to the Tiger-Cats, this time as a quarterback coach. He, along with offensive line coach John Salavantis and receivers coach Terry Greer shared offensive coordinator duties following the dismissal of John Jenkins. He returned to active roster on August 29 as the backup to Marvin Graves following injuries to Matt Dunigan and Anthony Calvillo. He took over the starting role for the team's September 8 game against the Winnipeg Blue Bombers. He continued in his dual role as coach and player until September 11, when John Jenkins was rehired as offensive coordinator. In the team's September 15 game against the Edmonton Eskimos, Kerrigan passed Bernie Faloney as Hamilton's career passing leader. Anthony Calvillo took over the starting job following his return from injury, but Kerrigan remained with the team as the backup. He was released by the team prior to the start of the 1997 season.

== Personal life ==
Kerrigan married a member of Brock University's food services department that he met while the Tiger-Cats held training camp there. During his playing career, Kerrigan resided in St. Catharines and had an antique business in Stoney Creek, Ontario. After his football career ended, Kerrigan returned to Illinois to become an auto parts salesman.
