= Marc Beswick =

Canadian football player (born 1983)

No. 3
- Position: Cornerback

Personal information
- Born: January 23, 1983 (age 43); Vancouver, British Columbia children = Tayah Harrison, Keyshawn Beswick, Jalen Harrison
- Listed height: 6 ft 1 in (1.85 m)
- Listed weight: 198 lb (90 kg)

Career information
- College: Saint Mary's
- CFL draft: 2008: 4th round, 31st overall pick

Career history
- Winnipeg Blue Bombers (2008); Hamilton Tiger-Cats (2009–2014)
- Stats at CFL.ca (archive)

Marc Beswick (born January 23, 1983) is a Canadian former professional football cornerback. He was drafted by the Winnipeg Blue Bombers in the 2008 CFL draft with the 31st pick in the fourth round. He played CIS Football at Saint Mary's.
