= Dave Hack =

American gridiron football player (born 1972)

No. 68
- Position: Offensive tackle

Personal information
- Born: April 22, 1972 (age 54); Holland, New York, U.S.

Career information
- College: Maryland

Career history
- 1996–2005: Hamilton Tiger-Cats
- 1996: Buffalo Bills*
- * Offseason or practice squad member only

Awards and highlights
- Grey Cup champion (1999); 5× CFL East All-Star (1999, 2000, 2001, 2002, 2004)

David Hack (born April 22, 1972) is a former Canadian Football League (CFL) offensive lineman who played ten seasons in the CFL for the Hamilton Tiger-Cats. He was named Eastern All-Star five times and was a part of the Grey Cup championship-winning Tiger-Cats in 1999. He was the head coach of the Niagara Wheatfield Senior High School Falcons Varsity football team from 2009-2010. Hack is currently the athletic director for Orchard Park High School located in Western New York. Hack also helps with the coaching of the school's varsity football team. Was signed to the Buffalo Bills practice squad on 11/27/96 where he spent the remainder of the season.
