= Mike Juhasz =

Canadian gridiron football player (born 1976)

Profile
- Positions: Slotback, Wide receiver

Personal information
- Born: July 23, 1976 (age 50); Vancouver, British Columbia
- Listed height: 6 ft 2 in (1.88 m)
- Listed weight: 200 lb (91 kg)

Career information
- High school: James Fowler
- College: North Dakota
- CFL draft: 2000: 2nd round, 14th overall pick

Career history
- 2000–2001: Hamilton Tiger-Cats
- 2002: Edmonton Eskimos*
- 2003–2005: Calgary Stampeders
- * Offseason or practice squad member only
- Stats at CFL.ca

Mike Juhasz (born July 23, 1976) is a Canadian former professional football wide receiver who played in the Canadian Football League (CFL).

== Early life ==
Juhasz grew up in Calgary and was a placekicker at James Fowler High School.

== College years ==
Juhasz attended the University of North Dakota and played for the Fighting Sioux football team, where he finished his career with 123 receptions for 1,572 yards (12.78 yards per reception avg.) and 16 touchdowns. As a senior, he set the school's single-season receptions record with 84 receptions for 945 yards (11.25 yards per rec avg.) and nine touchdowns.

== Professional career ==
Juhasz was chosen by the Hamilton Tiger-Cats in the 2000 CFL draft 14th overall, and after spending the first three games of the 2000 CFL season on the practice roster he played in the remaining 15 regular season games and had three receptions for 47 yards and one touchdown, two special teams tackles, and one defensive tackle. He spent the entire 2001 CFL season on Hamilton's injured list and signed to the Edmonton Eskimos practice roster for the 2002 CFL season.

Juhasz signed with the Calgary Stampeders for the 2003 CFL season and had a career year in the 2004 CFL season, playing slotback and unofficial backup kicker, he made a catch in every regular-season game for 634 receiving yards.
