= Mike Morreale =

Canadian gridiron football player (born 1971)

Ottawa Redblacks
- Title: President

Personal information
- Born: August 10, 1971 (age 55); Hamilton, Ontario, Canada
- Listed height: 6 ft 3 in (1.91 m)
- Listed weight: 210 lb (95 kg)

Career information
- Position: Slotback (No. 18)
- University: McMaster
- CFL draft: 1994: 2nd round, 17th overall pick

Career history

Playing
- 1995–1996: Toronto Argonauts
- 1997–2001: Hamilton Tiger-Cats
- 2002–2003: Toronto Argonauts
- 2004–2006: Hamilton Tiger-Cats

Coaching
- 2007: McMaster Marauders Offence and Special Teams

Operations
- 2007–2012: CFLPA Director Marketing
- 2012–2014: CFLPA President
- 2026–present: Ottawa Redblacks

Awards and highlights
- 2× Grey Cup champion (1996, 1999); CFL's Most Outstanding Canadian Award (1998); Dick Suderman Trophy (1999); Tom Pate Memorial Award (2000)
- Stats at CFL.ca

Mike Morreale (born August 10, 1971) is a Canadian former football player and president of the Ottawa Redblacks. He was a receiver in the Canadian Football League (CFL) for 12 seasons where he won two Grey Cup championships in 1996 and 1999. He has also served as the commissioner of the Canadian Elite Basketball League (CEBL).

== Early life ==
A graduate of Cardinal Newman Secondary School, where he earned athlete of the year honours and was football MVP twice, Morreale played his university football with the McMaster University Marauders from 1991 to 1994. He finished his Marauder career with 116 receptions for 1,880 yards and a school-record 16 touchdowns and had 217 yards on 27 punt returns and 185 yards on nine kickoff returns. He also carried the ball four times for 33 yards and averaged 33.7 yards on 36 punts. He was a CIAU second team All-Canadian once and a two-time OUAA All-Star at wide receiver. He was named to the McMaster Hall of Fame in 2005 and a member of the McMaster University Football Team of the Century.

== Professional football career ==
Morreale began his 12-year CFL career in 1995 with the Toronto Argonauts. He moved on to the Hamilton Tiger-Cats in 1997 and played there for 5 seasons before rejoining Toronto in 2002. He rejoined the Tiger-Cats in 2004. His best season was 1998, when he caught 67 passes for 1076 yards and played in the Grey Cup, and won the CFL's Most Outstanding Canadian Award. He also won two Grey Cup championships, in 1996 with Toronto, and in 1999 with Hamilton, when he was named the Grey Cup Most Valuable Canadian. In 2000, Morreale was awarded the Tom Pate Award for his contributions on and off the field in the CFL.

He was the CFL spokesman for the War Amps Champs program in 1997 and raised $26,000 for Hamilton Children's Hospital in the 1999 Morreale Macaroni campaign. He is also a first cousin of Toronto Argonauts legend Paul Masotti.

== Post-playing career in football ==
Morreale and fellow Hamilton, Ontario native linebacker Rob Hitchcock were released from the Hamilton Tiger-Cats on June 19, 2007. He officially announced his retirement on August 27, 2007, and joined the McMaster University football coaching staff. He was honoured by the Tiger-Cats at a halftime ceremony during the 2007 Labour Day Classic along with Rob Hitchcock.

Upon his retirement, Morreale became the Canadian Football League Players' Association (CFLPA) Director of Marketing, before being elected as the ninth President of the CFLPA in 2012, serving until 2014.

Morreale works as a colour analyst for U Sports football and was the colour analyst for the Hamilton Tiger Cats on CKOC from 2018 to 2019; after CHML reacquired the Tiger Cats radio rights, Morreale was retained as a studio contributor.

== CEBL commissioner ==
Morreale was the co-founder of the Canadian Elite Basketball League (CEBL) and became the league's inaugural commissioner in 2018. In January 2023, he signed a six-year contract extension with the CEBL to continue as commissioner beyond the 2028 season. However, on October 20, 2025, Morreale announced his resignation.

== Football executive career ==
On October 20, 2026, it was announced that Morreale had been hired as the president of the Ottawa Redblacks.
