= Joe Montford =

American gridiron football player (born 1970)

No. 53
- Position: Defensive end

Personal information
- Born: July 30, 1970 (age 56); Beaufort, North Carolina, U.S.
- Listed height: 6 ft 1 in (1.85 m)
- Listed weight: 225 lb (102 kg)

Career information
- College: South Carolina State

Career history
- 1995: Shreveport Pirates
- 1996–2001: Hamilton Tiger-Cats
- 2002: Toronto Argonauts
- 2003–2004: Hamilton Tiger-Cats
- 2005–2006: Edmonton Eskimos

Awards and highlights
- 2× Grey Cup champion (1999, 2005); 3× CFL's Most Outstanding Defensive Player Award (1998, 2000, 2001); 3× James P. McCaffrey Trophy (1998, 2000, 2001); 5× CFL All-Star (1998–2002); 5× CFL East All-Star (1998–2002)
- Canadian Football Hall of Fame (Class of 2011)

Joe Montford (born July 30, 1970) is a Canadian and American football defensive end. Montford played with the Shreveport Pirates (4 games in his first year in the CFL), the Toronto Argonauts, the Edmonton Eskimos, the Charlotte Rage of the Arena Football League (AFL) and, most famously, the Hamilton Tiger-Cats. He was inducted into the Canadian Football Hall of Fame in 2011.

== Career ==
From 1989 to 1993, Montford attended South Carolina State University, leading the school in tackles in 1993. In 2007 South Carolina State celebrated there "100 years in football", and selected Montford as one of the top 100 players of all-time.

Considered by many commentators as one of the greatest defensive players in the history of the Canadian Football League, Montford was a four-time CFL sack leader, three-time winner of the CFL's Most Outstanding Defensive Player Award, five-time East Division All-Star, and five-time CFL All-Star. In November, 2006, Montford was voted one of the CFL's Top 50 players (#40) of the league's modern era by Canadian sports network TSN.

Montford enjoyed his best seasons as a Hamilton Tiger-Cats as the key player in the team's defensive front seven. Montford was the Tiger-Cats' all-time leader in tackles until former teammate and linebacker Rob Hitchcock broke the record while Montford was with the Eskimos. In 1999, Montford came within half a sack of Hall-of-Famer James Parker's single season record of 26.5, but missed out on defensive player of the year honours to teammate Calvin Tiggle as Hamilton, with Most Outstanding Player Danny McManus also on the team, took the 87th Grey Cup 32-21.

Montford signed a high-priced deal with Toronto for the 2002 CFL season, but he failed to bring his old self to Toronto and struggled on a mediocre Argonauts team. This led to the team trading Montford back to Hamilton for speedy receiver Tony Miles and non-import fullback Randy Bowles on March 13, 2003. Montford played 2003 and 2004 back with Hamilton, as the team slid down the East Division standings.

After the 2004 season, Montford was traded to Edmonton for offensive lineman Dan Comiskey (who the Eskimos later re-acquired in the Troy Davis trade). Montford played the 2005 season with Edmonton, and helped the team take the 93rd Grey Cup. In the championship game, it was Montford who chased Montreal Alouettes quarterback Anthony Calvillo out of the pocket on third-and-thirty-one and forced him to attempt a quick kick punt on the last play of overtime.

On Wednesday, April 27, 2006, Montford was released from the Eskimos.

On Monday, July 3, 2006, Montford was re-signed by the Eskimos.

Aside from Joe Montford's public career as a professional football player he also spend months working with children in a group home in the suburbs of Atlanta, Georgia in 2000. He left this job after the parent company of the group home which owned similar facilities throughout the United States filed for bankruptcy and the decision was made to close the facility. Joe Montford was known there for teaching the kids many of whom had little or no parental involvement growing up how to play football and other sports. He served as one of the few positive male role models many of the teenage boys there he worked with ever had. To this day one of the boys he worked with who is now a college senior keeps the autographed card Joe Montford gave him in his wallet and carries it with him as a reminder of where he came from.

Montford was inducted onto the Hamilton Tiger-Cats Wall Of Honour on August 23, 2018.
