= Andrew Grigg =

Canadian football player (born 1971)

No. 89
- Position: Wide receiver

Personal information
- Born: April 25, 1971 (age 55); Sault Ste. Marie, Ontario, Canada

Career information
- College: Ottawa

Career history
- 1995–2002: Hamilton Tiger-Cats

Awards and highlights
- Grey Cup champion (1999); 2× CFL East All-Star (1998, 2001)

Andrew Grigg (born April 25, 1971) is a Canadian former professional football wide receiver in the Canadian Football League (CFL) who played eight seasons for the Hamilton Tiger-Cats. Grigg played from 1995 to 2002 with the Hamilton Tiger-Cats. He had 318 receptions for 5,293 yards and 27 touchdowns in his career.
