= Mike Mihelic =

Canadian football player (born 1973)

Mike Mihelic is a former offensive lineman in the Canadian Football League.
