= Ronald Williams (Canadian football) =

American gridiron football player (born 1972)

Profile
- Position: Running back

Personal information
- Born: May 19, 1972 (age 54); Marietta, Georgia, U.S.

Career information
- High school: Ninety Six High School
- College: Clemson

Career history
- 1993: Cincinnati Bengals
- 1995: Rhein Fire
- 1996: BC Lions (CFL)
- 1997: Winnipeg Blue Bombers (CFL)
- 1998–2001: Hamilton Tiger-Cats (CFL)
- 2001–2002: Edmonton Eskimos (CFL)

Awards and highlights
- Grey Cup champion (1999); 3× CFL East All-Star (1998, 1999, 2000); First-team All-ACC (1990); Second-team All-ACC (1991)

Ronald Williams (born May 19, 1972) is a former star Canadian Football League (CFL) running back who played seven seasons for four teams. Williams finished his career with 6110 yards rushing. He was named to the CFL Eastern Division All Star team in 1998. He won the 1999 Grey Cup with the Hamilton Tiger-Cats. Williams was a stand out player at Ninety Six High School and Clemson University both in South Carolina. He was awarded the ACC Rookie of the Year award in 1990. He turned pro and nominated for the NFL draft in 1992, but was not selected.
