= 55th Grey Cup =

1967 Canadian Football championship game

Hamilton Tiger-Cats	Saskatchewan Roughriders
(10–4)	(12–4)
24	1
Head coach: Ralph Sazio	Head coach: Eagle Keys
	1	2	3	4	Total
Hamilton Tiger-Cats	7	10	0	7	24
Saskatchewan Roughriders	1	0	0	0	1
- Date: December 2, 1967
- Stadium: Frank Clair Stadium
- Location: Ottawa
- Most Valuable Player: Joe Zuger, QB (Tiger-Cats)
- Attendance: 31,358

Broadcasters
- Network: CBC, CTV, SRC

The 55th Grey Cup was played between the Hamilton Tiger-Cats and the Saskatchewan Roughriders on December 2, 1967, at Lansdowne Park in Ottawa, before 31,358 fans and was won by the Tiger-Cats by a score of 24–1.

== Box Score ==
First quarter

Hamilton – TD – Joe Zuger 3 yard run (Tommy Joe Coffey convert)
Saskatchewan – Rouge – Alan Ford 87 yard punt

Second quarter

Hamilton – TD – Ted Watkins 72 yard pass from Joe Zuger (Tommy Joe Coffey convert)
Hamilton - Rouge - Tommy Joe Coffey 42 yard missed field goal
Hamilton - Rouge - Joe Zuger punt
Hamilton - Rouge - Joe Zuger punt

Fourth quarter

Hamilton - Rouge - Joe Zuger punt
Hamilton – TD – Billy Ray Locklin 43 yard fumble return (convert missed)

Teams	Q1	Q2	Q3	Q4	Final
Hamilton Tiger Cats	7	10	0	7	24
Saskatchewan Roughriders	1	0	0	0	1

== Game characteristics ==
Joe Zuger, Hamilton's quarterback, was named the game's Grey Cup Most Valuable Player.

The game marked the sixth consecutive game in the season that the Ticats held their opponents without a touchdown.

Alan Ford's 87 yard punt, on a quick kick, is the longest in Grey Cup history.
