= Gary Brown (offensive lineman) =

American football player (born 1971)

No. 71, 68, 67
- Position: Offensive tackle

Personal information
- Born: June 25, 1971 (age 55); Amityville, New York, U.S.
- Listed height: 6 ft 4 in (1.93 m)
- Listed weight: 320 lb (145 kg)

Career information
- High school: Brentwood (Brentwood, New York)
- College: Nassau CC (1990–1991); Georgia Tech (1992–1993)
- NFL draft: 1994: 5th round, 148th overall pick

Career history
- Pittsburgh Steelers (1994)*; Green Bay Packers (1994–1996); San Francisco 49ers (1998)*; Barcelona Dragons (1998-2000); Hamilton Tiger-Cats (2000–2002)
- * Offseason or practice squad member only

Awards and highlights
- Super Bowl champion (XXXI)

Career NFL statistics
- Games played: 25
- Games started: 5
- Stats at Pro Football Reference

Gary Lee Brown (born June 25, 1971) is an American former professional football player who was an offensive tackle in the National Football League (NFL) for the Green Bay Packers. He played college football for the Georgia Tech Yellow Jackets. Brown was inducted into the Suffolk Sports Hall of Fame on Long Island in the Football Category with the Class of 2015.

== Professional career ==
=== Pittsburgh Steelers ===
The Pittsburgh Steelers drafted Brown in the fifth round (148th overall) of the 1994 NFL draft. He was cut by the Steelers during final cuts in 1994.

=== Green Bay Packers ===
Brown debuted with the Green Bay Packers and played three seasons with them from 1994–1996. During his 3-year professional career he played in 25 games, starting 5 of his 8 games (including the first four) for the Super Bowl XXXI Champion Packers in 1996, although he was inactive for the Super Bowl. He was almost suspended for substance abuse after a 1995 DUI but was only fined.
