= 53rd Grey Cup =

1965 Canadian Football championship game

Hamilton Tiger-Cats	Winnipeg Blue Bombers
(10–4)	(11–5)
22	16
Head coach: Ralph Sazio	Head coach: Bud Grant
	1	2	3	4	Total
Hamilton Tiger-Cats	10	0	12	0	22
Winnipeg Blue Bombers	0	13	0	3	16
- Date: November 27, 1965
- Stadium: CNE Stadium
- Location: Toronto
- National anthem: Local Men’s Chorus
- Referee: Ray Boucher
- Attendance: 32,655

Broadcasters
- Network: CBC, CTV, SRC

The 53rd Grey Cup, also known as the Wind Bowl, was hosted at CNE Stadium in Toronto on November 27, 1965. The Hamilton Tiger-Cats defeated the Winnipeg Blue Bombers 22–16.

== Weather conditions and change in punting rule ==
Because of strong winds of up 30–40 mph (48–64 km/h), CFL officials, in agreement with both head coaches, Bud Grant for Winnipeg and Ralph Sazio for Hamilton, changed a punting rule prior to the game, perhaps unprecedented in CFL if not in football history. Instead of all punts having to be being returned without the fair catch rule as is standard in Canadian football, punts into the wind would be ruled dead as soon as the returner touched the ball, a sort of forced fair catch rule, the rule being voluntary in the American football. Without the rule change, it was thought that the team going against the wind would lose the viable option of punting and be forced instead to try to convert on third downs all the time.

== Key elements in the game ==
A strong wind prevailed throughout the game, and all scoring occurred while the team who received the points was going with the wind. To retain possession of the ball, the Blue Bombers conceded one safety touch in the first quarter and two in the third quarter while struggling against the wind. In the fourth quarter with the wind at their backs, the Bombers began a last-minute drive, snuffed out when fullback Art Perkins was stopped cold by the Hamilton defence on a third-and-one gamble. The Bombers lost by 6 points, the margin of the three yielded safeties. They would next return to the Grey Cup game 19 years later, the 72nd Grey Cup in 1984.

== Box score ==
First quarter

Hamilton – Single –
Hamilton – TD – Dick Cohee 7 yard run (Don Sutherin convert)
Hamilton – Safety –

Second quarter

Winnipeg – TD – Art Perkins 8 yard run (Norm Winton convert Failed)
Winnipeg – TD – Leo Lewis 5 yard run (Norm Winton convert)

Third quarter

Hamilton – TD – Willie Bethea 69 yard pass from Joe Zuger (Don Sutherin convert)
Hamilton – Safety –
Hamilton – Safety –
Hamilton – Single – punt by Joe Zuger

Fourth quarter

Winnipeg – Field goal – Norm Winton

== Rule change implemented because of this game ==
As a result of the strategy employed by the Blue Bombers, in which they voluntarily conceded safeties to keep the ball, the rules were changed for the following 1966 CFL season. Teams scored against on a safety touch would no longer be entitled to keep the ball. Instead, they would be forced to kick the ball away to the other team.

== Music ==
The Royal Military College of Canada Pipes and Drums played at halftime.

== Videos ==
- Entire game on YouTube

== Photos ==
Frank Rigney blocking
