= Ralph Sazio =

Canadian football player, coach, and executive (1922–2008)

Profile
- Position: Offensive tackle

Personal information
- Born: July 22, 1922; Avellino, Italy
- Died: September 25, 2008 (aged 86); Burlington, Ontario, Canada

Career information
- High school: Columbia (Maplewood, New Jersey, U.S.)
- College: College of William and Mary
- NFL draft: 1947: 28th round, 258th overall pick

Career history

Playing
- 1948: Brooklyn Dodgers (AAFC)
- 1950–1953: Hamilton Tiger-Cats

Coaching
- 1950–1962: Hamilton Tiger-Cats (Asst.)
- 1963–1967: Hamilton Tiger-Cats

Operations
- 1968–1975, 1980: Hamilton Tiger-Cats (GM)
- 1972–1977: Hamilton Tiger-Cats (President)
- 1978–1980: Hamilton Tiger-Cats (VP)
- 1981–1990: Toronto Argonauts (President)

Awards and highlights
- Second-team All-SoCon (1946); Annis Stukus Trophy (1964)
- Stats at Pro Football Reference
- Canadian Football Hall of Fame (Class of 1998)

Ralph Joseph Sazio (July 22, 1922 – September 25, 2008) was an Italian professional Canadian football player, coach, and executive. He is a member of the Canadian Football Hall of Fame (1998) as a builder.

Sazio was born in Avellino, Italy and played high school football at Columbia High School in Maplewood, New Jersey. He played college football at the College of William and Mary and played for the AAFC's Brooklyn Dodgers in 1948.

== Career ==
Sazio was a mainstay of the Canadian Football League's Hamilton Tiger-Cats as a player, assistant coach, head coach, general manager and team president.

Sazio's major contribution was as the Tiger-cats' head coach from 1963 to 1967, winning three Grey Cup championships during that span. He retired from coaching in 1967 as the most successful Tiger-Cat head coach to date in terms of championships (3) and winning percentage.

Sazio later served as Toronto Argonauts team president from 1981 to 1990.

Sazio was elected to the Canadian Football Hall of Fame in 1998 in the builder category. He died in 2008.

== Coaching record ==
- Overall: 60–24–1 (.712)
- Regular Season: 49–20–1 (.707)
- Playoffs: 11–4 (.733)
- 1 Grey Cup defeat (1964)
- 3 Grey Cups (1963, 1965, 1967)
