= Rob Hitchcock =

Canadian player of American and Canadian football

No. 42
- Positions: Safety, Linebacker

Personal information
- Born: October 28, 1970 (age 56); Hamilton, Ontario, Canada

Career information
- College: Weber State
- CFL draft: 1995: 2nd round, 17th overall pick

Career history
- 1995–2006: Hamilton Tiger-Cats
- 2007: Edmonton Eskimos

Awards and highlights
- Grey Cup champion (1999); 2× CFL All-Star (1999, 2001); 3× CFL East All-Star (1999, 2001, 2002)

Robert "Rob" Hitchcock (born October 28, 1970) is a former linebacker and safety who played in the Canadian Football League. He played for his hometown Hamilton Tiger-Cats from 1995 to 2006 and the Edmonton Eskimos in 2007. On January 31, 2008, Hitchcock was released by the Eskimos. Hitchcock is second all time on the with a total of 484 defensive tackles, and 607 total tackles. He also won a Grey Cup in 1999 with Hamilton. Hitchcock played three seasons of college football at Weber State University.
