= 51st Grey Cup =

1963 Canadian Football championship game

Hamilton Tiger-Cats	BC Lions
(10–4)	(12–4)
21	10
Head coach: Ralph Sazio	Head coach: Dave Skrien
	1	2	3	4	Total
Hamilton Tiger-Cats	0	14	7	0	21
BC Lions	0	3	0	7	10
- Date: November 30, 1963
- Stadium: Empire Stadium
- Location: Vancouver
- Referee: Ray Boucher
- Attendance: 36,545

Broadcasters
- Network: CBC, CTV, SRC

The 51st Grey Cup took place on November 30, 1963, at Empire Stadium in Vancouver, British Columbia, and decided the Canadian Football League (CFL) champion for the 1963 season. The Hamilton Tiger-Cats defeated the BC Lions 21–10, in front of 36,545 spectators.

The game is best remembered for a controversial sequence involving American players Angelo Mosca and Willie Fleming. Mosca was accused of kicking Fleming's head while the latter laid on the field. Fleming left the game, leading to a long-standing grudge between alumni of both teams.

In 2011, Mosca and former Lions quarterback Joe Kapp had a physical altercation regarding the play at a CFL Alumni Association charity luncheon.

After both players traded words, event host Ron James invited both players to make a peace gesture. Kapp jokingly presented Mosca with an ornament flower he had picked at his table. When Mosca emphatically refused it, Kapp tried to shove it in his face. Mosca swung his cane at Kapp in retaliation, hitting him in the head. An irate Kapp then knocked Mosca down to the floor with a pair of punches and kicked him, before turning to the stunned attendance and shouting "Sportsmanship! That's what it's all about folks, sportsmanship."

The event was captured on video by one of the attendees and became the object of significant media attention, in particular because of the 48-year gap between the original play and the altercation that stemmed from it. At the time of the incident, Kapp and Mosca were both 73.

Monday Night Football aired the fight footage in a pre-game segment, and Mosca appeared on Dr. Phil to discuss the feud. Kapp emphatically declined to appear.

The cane used by Mosca in the fight was auctioned for charity in 2012, and sold for CDN$7,700.

Because of Mosca's second career as a professional wrestler for such promotions as NWA Georgia and the then-WWF, it has been suggested that the confrontation may have been staged as a publicity stunt for Mosca's upcoming biography Tell It To My Face. However, these claims remain unsubstantiated.
