= 87th Grey Cup =

1999 Canadian Football championship game

Hamilton Tiger-Cats	Calgary Stampeders
(11–7)	(12–6)
32	21
Head coach: Ron Lancaster	Head coach: Wally Buono
	1	2	3	4	Total
Hamilton Tiger-Cats	10	11	4	7	32
Calgary Stampeders	0	0	14	7	21
- Date: November 28, 1999
- Stadium: BC Place Stadium
- Location: Vancouver
- Most Valuable Player: Danny McManus, QB (Tiger-Cats)
- Most Valuable Canadian: Mike Morreale, SB (Tiger-Cats)
- Referee: Ken Lazaruk
- Attendance: 45,118

Broadcasters
- Network: CBC, RDS
- Announcers: (CBC) Steve Armitage, Chris Cuthbert, Mark Lee, Chris Walby, Brian Williams, Glen Suitor, Caroline Corey

The 87th Grey Cup (Canadian Football League championship) was held in 1999 in Vancouver. The Hamilton Tiger-Cats won the game 32–21 over the Calgary Stampeders in a rematch of the previous year's 86th Grey Cup.

== Game summary ==
Hamilton Tiger-Cats (32) - TD's, Ronald Williams, Darren Flutie (2); FG's, Paul Osbaldiston (3); cons., Osbaldiston (3); singles, Osbaldiston (2).

Calgary Stampeders (21) - TD's, Vince Danielson, Allen Pitts, Duane Forde; cons., Mark McLoughlin (3).

First quarter
HAM—TD Williams 1-yard run (Osbaldiston convert) 4:52
HAM—FG Osbaldiston 46 yard field-goal 13:39
Second quarter
HAM—Single Osbaldiston missed 56 yard field-goal attempt, one-point granted 0:44
HAM—FG Osbaldiston 41 yard field-goal 9:26
HAM—TD Flutie 13-yard pass from McManus (Osbaldiston convert) 13:57
Third quarter
HAM—Single Osbaldiston missed 41 yard-field goal attempt, one-point granted 1:34
CAL—TD Danielson 7-yard pass from Dickenson (McLoughlin convert) 4:55
CAL—TD Pitts 18-yard pass from Dickenson (McLoughlin convert) 9:57
HAM—FG Osbaldiston 20 yard field-goal 13:08
Fourth quarter
HAM—TD Flutie 7-yard pass from McManus (Osbaldiston convert) 0:39
CAL—TD Forde 1-yard run (McLoughlin convert) 12:00

The Tiger-Cat started off strong from the opening kick-off. Midway through the first quarter, the Tiger-Cats got on the board as McManus hit Williams for a 35-yard gain to the Stamps' 15-yard line. Three plays later, Williams plunged into the end zone from one-yard out to give the Tiger-Cats a 7–0 lead.

On Hamilton's next possession, McManus found Flutie for a 40-yard gain as the Tiger-Cats again moved into Calgary territory. That led to a 46-yard field goal from Paul Osbaldiston to give the Tiger-Cats a 10–0 advantage, as the gun sounded to end the first quarter.

With almost four minutes gone in the second quarter, the Stampeders finally picked up their first first down when Kelvin Anderson ran wide near midfield. However they were unable to sustain the drive.

Midway through the second quarter, the Hamilton offence drove downfield as McManus passed to Darren Flutie and Andrew Grigg culminating in a 41-yard field goal by Osbaldiston.

Late in the half, Calgary punter Tony Martino pinned the Tiger-Cats deep with a 42-yard punt that went out of bounds at the 4-yard line. The move appeared to pay off but the Hamilton defence then took centre stage.

When Joe Montford sacked Calgary quarterback Dave Dickenson, the ball came loose and Tim Terry scooped it up. From there, McManus found Flutie open in the end zone and he made a one-hand grab for the touchdown.

The Stamps had only 51 yards in total offence in the first half.

The Stamps tried some trickery on the second half kickoff with an onside kick but the Tiger-Cats recovered the ball with good field position. Osbaldiston turned that into a single point.

Then came the biggest play of the game for Calgary. Dickenson spotted Travis Moore behind the Hamilton defence and completed a 57-yard pass down to the 7-yard line. On the next play, Dickenson passed to Danielsen, who took it in for the touchdown to put the Stamps on the board.

On their next possession, the Stampeders took the ball down the field again and Dickenson found Pitts wide open in the end zone to close the gap to 22–14.

Osbaldiston added a 20-yard field goal late in the quarter to take some momentum away from the resurgent Stampeders.

McManus then engineered a drive to open the fourth quarter culminating in a touchdown pass to Flutie.

Calgary's next possession was ended by an interception by Orlondo Steinauer. Calgary regained possession, Dickenson drove deep into Hamilton territory and, on third down, Duane Forde plunged over the goal line with just over three minutes remaining. The Stamps were unable to score again and so came up short as the Tiger-Cats won 32–21.

== Notable facts ==
Grey Cup Most Valuable Player Danny McManus led the way connecting on 22 of 34 passes for 347 yards and no interceptions. Darren Flutie was also impressive, pulling in six catches for 109 yards and two touchdowns.

Cats kicker Paul Osbaldiston chipped in with three field goals, while slotback Mike Morreale caught three passes for 51 yards and was named the game's Most Valuable Canadian.

This is Hamilton's most recent Grey Cup victory. As of the 2026 season, they have the longest Grey Cup drought in the league, and they are the only team in the CFL to not win the Grey Cup in the 21st century.

== 1999 CFL Playoffs ==
=== West Division ===
- Semi-final (November 14 @ Calgary, Alberta) Calgary Stampeders 30-17 Edmonton Eskimos
- Final (November 21 @ Vancouver, British Columbia) Calgary Stampeders 26-24 BC Lions

=== East Division ===
- Semi-final (November 14 @ Hamilton, Ontario) Hamilton Tiger-Cats 27-6 Toronto Argonauts
- Final (November 21 @ Montreal, Quebec) Hamilton Tiger-Cats 27-26 Montreal Alouettes
