= 1999 Hamilton Tiger-Cats season =

Season of Canadian Football League team the Hamilton Tiger-Cats

- General manager: Neil Lumsden
- Head coach: Ron Lancaster
- Home stadium: Ivor Wynne Stadium

Results
- Record: 11–7
- Division place: 2nd, East
- Playoffs: Won Grey Cup
- Team MOP: Danny McManus
- Team MOC: Rob Hitchcock
- Team MOR: Corey Grant

Uniform

The 1999 Hamilton Tiger-Cats season was the 42nd season for the team in the Canadian Football League (CFL) and their 50th overall. The Tiger-Cats finished in second place in the East Division with an 11–7 record and won the Grey Cup in a rematch of the previous year's championship game against the Calgary Stampeders. To date, this remains as the most recent season that the Hamilton Tiger-Cats have won the Grey Cup, although they did make an appearance in 2013, 2014, 2019, and 2021, but lost each time.

This season, Hamilton set a CFL record (since 1978) for fewest quarterback sacks allowed in one season (7).

== Offseason ==
=== CFL draft ===
Rd	Pick	Player	Position	School
1	7	Corey Grant	WR	Wilfrid Laurier
3	22	Morty Bryce	DB	Bowling Green
4	31	Jason Tibbits	DB	Waterloo
5	38	Mike MacKenzie	RB	Eastern Washington
6	45	Pascal Cheron	OL	Laval

== Roster ==
1999 Hamilton Tiger-Cats final roster
Quarterbacks: 8 Montressa Kirby; 11 Cody Ledbetter; 14 Danny McManus; Running backs: 9 Archie Amerson; 5 Éric Lapointe; 34 Jarrett Smith; 24 Ronald Williams; Receivers: 81 Tony Akins; 82 Darren Flutie; 2 Corey Grant; 89 Andrew Grigg; 18 Mike Morreale; 86 Trevor Shaw	Offensive linemen: 61 Bob Beveridge G/T; 55 Chris Burns G; 51 Carl Coulter C; 64 Seth Dittman T; 68 Dave Hack T; 62 Tim Prinsen G; 58 Frank Rocca C/G; Defensive linemen: 98 Mike Campbell DT; 99 Jeff Cummins DT; 79 Derek MacCready DT; 53 Joe Montford DE; 77 Mike Philbrick DT; 92 Tim Terry DE	Linebackers: 15 Joe Hagins; 38 Cooper Harris; 45 Lamar McGriggs; 47 Warren Muzika; 73 Calvin Tiggle; Defensive backs: 6 Tommy Henry; 42 Rob Hitchcock; 30 Chris Shelling; 22 Orlondo Steinauer; 39 Gerald Vaughn; 7 Kyle Walters; 28 Frank West; Special teams: 3 Paul Osbaldiston K/P	Injured list: 52 Keaton Cromartie DE; 95 Tim Fleiszer DE; 90 Gonzalo Floyd DE; 29 Mace Freeman SB; 21 Eurosius Parker DB; 25 Shino Prater DB; 35 Dan Pronyk RB; 4 Mario Smith DB; 94 Obie Spanic DT; 31 Jason Van Geel LB; Italics indicate American players

== Preseason ==
Week	Date	Opponent	Result	Record	Venue	Attendance
A	June 25	at Toronto Argonauts	W 31–10	1–0		18,266
B	July 1	vs. Winnipeg Blue Bombers	W 29–24	2–0		14,354

== Regular season ==
=== Season standings ===
East Division
Pos	Team	Pld	W	L	T	PF	PA	PD	Pts
1	Montreal Alouettes (C, Q)	18	12	6	0	495	395	+100	24
2	Hamilton Tiger-Cats (Q)	18	11	7	0	603	378	+225	22
3	Toronto Argonauts (Q)	18	9	9	0	386	373	+13	18
4	Winnipeg Blue Bombers	18	6	12	0	362	601	−239	12

Source: "1999 CFL regular season standings". Archived from the original on 2009-06-29.
(C) First round bye; (Q) Qualified for playoffs

=== Schedule ===
Week	Date	Opponent	Result	Record	Venue	Attendance
1	July 8	at Winnipeg Blue Bombers	W 39–9	1–0		29,681
2	July 16	vs. Montreal Alouettes	L 16–22	1–1		18,352
3	July 23	at Toronto Argonauts	L 21–24	1–2		25,558
4	July 29	vs. Edmonton Eskimos	W 54–8	2–2		16,815
5	Aug 5	vs. Saskatchewan Roughriders	W 63–17	3–2		16,423
6	Aug 12	at Montreal Alouettes	L 17–24	3–3		19,461
7	Aug 19	vs. BC Lions	L 33–38	3–4		18,875
8	Aug 27	at Edmonton Eskimos	W 30–23	4–4		34,180
9	Sept 6	vs. Toronto Argonauts	W 35–28	5–4		28,895
10	Sept 12	at Montreal Alouettes	L 19–52	5–5		19,461
11	Sept 18	vs. Winnipeg Blue Bombers	W 65–15	6–5		17,157
12	Sept 27	vs. Montreal Alouettes	W 39–13	7–5		20,648
13	Oct 1	at Calgary Stampeders	L 17–21	7–6		26,062
14	Oct 10	at Winnipeg Blue Bombers	W 43–16	8–6		21,915
15	Oct 16	vs. Toronto Argonauts	W 18–2	9–6		23,832
16	Oct 24	at Saskatchewan Roughriders	W 42–12	10–6		18,166
17	Oct 30	at BC Lions	L 21–26	10–7		18,817
18	Nov 6	vs. Calgary Stampeders	W 31–28	11–7		19,460

== Postseason ==
Round	Date	Opponent	Result	Record	Venue	Attendance
East Semi-Final	Nov 14	vs. Toronto Argonauts	W 27–6	1–0		21,873
East Final	Nov 21	at Montreal Alouettes	W 27–26	2–0		19,461
Grey Cup	Nov 28	vs. Calgary Stampeders	W 32–21	3–0		45,118

=== Grey Cup ===
Team	Q1	Q2	Q3	Q4	Total
Hamilton Tiger-Cats	10	11	4	7	32
Calgary Stampeders	0	0	7	14	21

== Awards and honours ==
=== 1999 CFL All-Stars ===
- Darren Flutie - Slotback
- Rob Hitchcock - Safety
- Danny McManus - Quarterback
- Joe Montford - Defensive End
- Calvin Tiggle - Linebacker
- Gerald Vaughn - Halfback
