= 1999 Toronto Argonauts season =

CFL team season

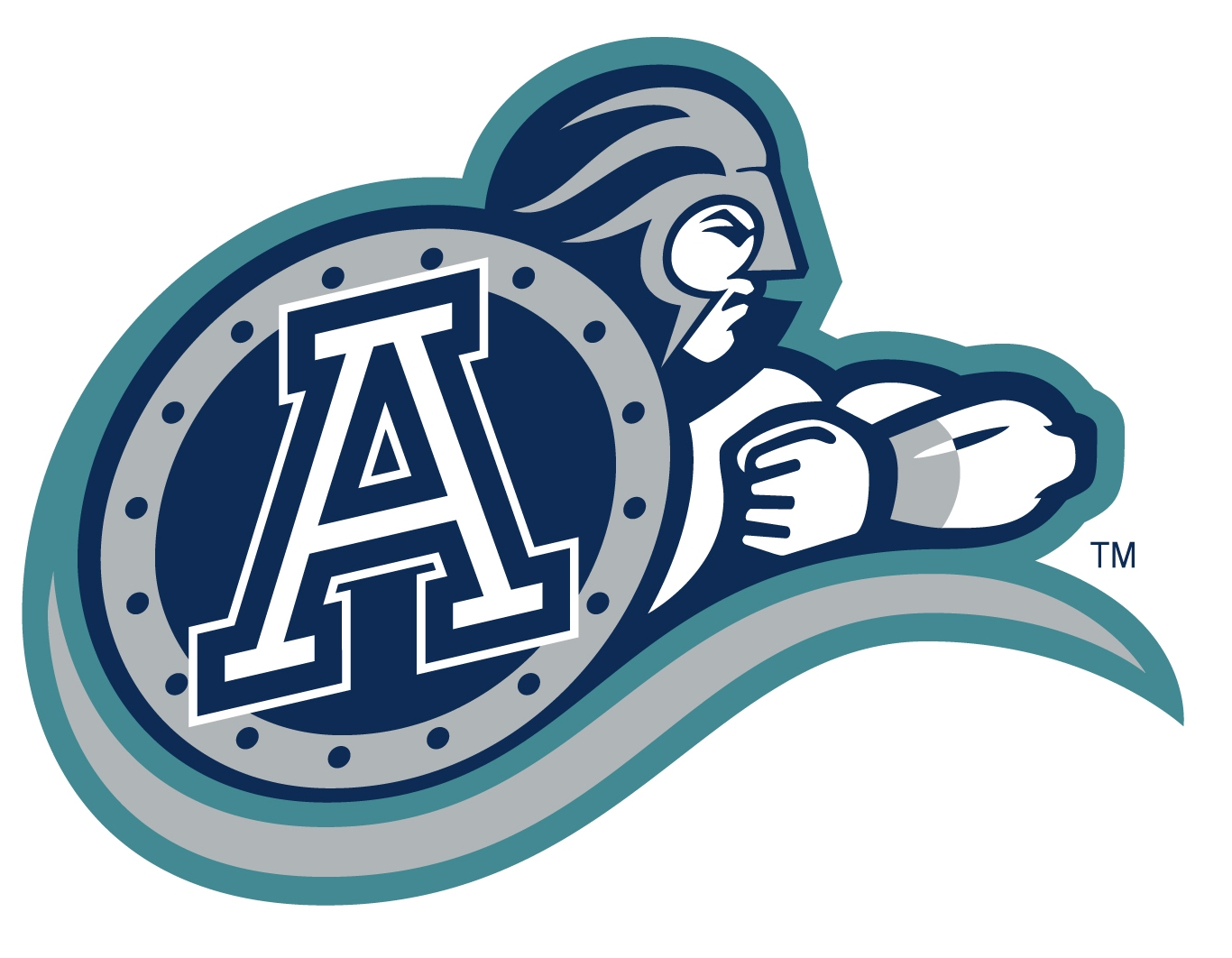
- General manager: Eric Tillman
- Head coach: Jim Barker
- Home stadium: SkyDome

Results
- Record: 9–9
- Division place: 3rd, East
- Playoffs: Lost Division Semi-Final

The 1999 Toronto Argonauts finished in third place in the East Division of the 1999 CFL season with a 9–9 record and lost the East Division Semi-Finals.

== Offseason ==
=== CFL draft ===
Rd	Pick	Player	Position	School
1	2	David De La Perralle	OL	Kentucky
2	13	Wayne Shaw	CB	Kent State
3	21	J. P. Darche	LB	McGill
4	29	Andre Trudel	OL	Laval
5	36	Glynn Hall	WR	Saint Mary's

=== Preseason ===
Week	Date	Opponent	Results		Venue	Attendance
Week	Date	Opponent	Score	Record	Venue	Attendance
A	June 25	Hamilton Tiger-Cats	L 10–31	0–1	SkyDome	18,266
B	June 30	at Montreal Alouettes	W 23–17	1–1	Molson Stadium	14,498

== Regular season ==
=== Season standings ===
East Division
Pos	Team	Pld	W	L	T	PF	PA	PD	Pts
1	Montreal Alouettes (C, Q)	18	12	6	0	495	395	+100	24
2	Hamilton Tiger-Cats (Q)	18	11	7	0	603	378	+225	22
3	Toronto Argonauts (Q)	18	9	9	0	386	373	+13	18
4	Winnipeg Blue Bombers	18	6	12	0	362	601	−239	12

Source: "1999 CFL regular season standings". Archived from the original on 2009-06-29.
(C) First round bye; (Q) Qualified for playoffs

=== Regular season ===
Week	Date	Opponent	Results		Venue	Attendance
Week	Date	Opponent	Score	Record	Venue	Attendance
1	July 10	vs. Montreal Alouettes	L 12–15	0–1	SkyDome	21,028
2	July 15	at Winnipeg Blue Bombers	L 27–47	0–2	Winnipeg Stadium	18,025
3	July 23	Hamilton Tiger-Cats	W 24–21	1–2	SkyDome	25,558
4	July 30	at Saskatchewan Roughriders	L 15–20	1–3	Taylor Field	18,256
5	August 6	vs. Winnipeg Blue Bombers	W 40–7	2–3	SkyDome	21,308
6	August 12	at BC Lions	W 28–26	3–3	BC Place	20,586
7	August 20	vs. Montreal Alouettes	W 23–20	4–3	SkyDome	20,152
8	August 27	at Montreal Alouettes	L 5–20	4–4	Molson Stadium	19,461
9	September 6	at Hamilton Tiger-Cats	L 28–35	4–5	Ivor Wynne Stadium	28,895
10	September 11	vs. Saskatchewan Roughriders	W 28–3	5–5	SkyDome	17,216
11	September 18	at Calgary Stampeders	L 26–29	5–6	McMahon Stadium	32,883
12	September 26	at Edmonton Eskimos	W 20–16	6–6	Commonwealth Stadium	31,085
13	October 2	vs. BC Lions	L 19–28	6–7	SkyDome	21,084
14	October 9	vs. Calgary Stampeders	W 24–13	7–7	SkyDome	20,036
15	October 16†	at Hamilton Tiger-Cats	L 2–18	7–8	Ivor Wynne Stadium	23,832
16	October 22	vs. Winnipeg Blue Bombers	W 32–22	8–8	SkyDome	23,632
17	October 29	at Winnipeg Blue Bombers	L 13–18	8–9	Winnipeg Stadium	27,043
18	November 6	vs. Edmonton Eskimos	W 20–15	9–9	SkyDome	28,387

- † Canadian Football Hall of Fame Game

== Postseason ==
Game	Date	Opponent	Results		Venue	Attendance
Game	Date	Opponent	Score	Record	Venue	Attendance
East Semi-Final	November 14	at Hamilton Tiger-Cats	L 6–27	0–1	Ivor Wynne Stadium	21,873

== Roster ==
1999 Toronto Argonauts final roster
Quarterbacks: 13 Jim Ballard; 7 Jay Barker; 15 Jimmy Kemp; Running backs: 34 Tony Burse; 31 Michael Clemons; 20 Darren Joseph; 33 Ryan Terry; Receivers: 28 Duane Dmytryshyn; 81 Andre Kirwan; 88 Paul Masotti; 87 Derrell Mitchell; 14 Stefan Ptaszek	Offensive linemen: 62 Sandy Annunziata C/G; 58 Chris Gioskos G; 52 Craig Hendrickson T; 62 Dwayne Morgan T; 69 Dave Mudge T; 68 Steve Salter G; 66 Jude St. John G; Defensive linemen: 96 Cameron Chance DT; 73 Roger Dunbrack DE; 99 Jermaine Haley DT; 91 Demetrious Maxie DE/DT; 94 Fred Perry DE	Linebackers: 37 Jimmy Clements; 39 J. P. Darche; 35 Martavious Houston; 38 Derek Krete; 50 Mike O'Shea; Defensive backs: 10 Antonious Bonner; 23 Alundis Brice; 16 Byron Capers; 24 Andrew Henry; 30 Wayne Shaw; 12 Adrion Smith; 19 Donald Smith; 26 Kelly Wiltshire	Special teams: 4 Dan Giancola K; 1 Noel Prefontaine K/P; Injured list: 68 Inoke Breckterfield DE; 57 David De La Perralle T; 8 Andrew English SB; 56 Chad Folk C; 59 Glen Young LB; Italics indicate International player

== Awards and records ==
- Pinball Clemons, 1999 Tom Pate Award

=== 1999 CFL All-Stars ===
- DT – Demetrious Maxie
- LB – Mike O'Shea
- CB – Adrion Smith
- P – Noel Prefontaine

=== Eastern Division All-Star Selections ===
- DT – Demetrious Maxie
- LB – Mike O'Shea
- CB – Adrion Smith
- P – Noel Prefontaine
