= 1999 Montreal Alouettes season =

Canadian football team season

- Head coach: Charlie Taaffe
- Home stadium: Molson Stadium

Results
- Record: 12–6
- Division place: 1st, East
- Playoffs: Lost East Final

Uniform

The 1999 Montreal Alouettes finished in first place in the East Division for the first time since 1979 with a 12–6 record. This was the last full season for Anthony Calvillo sharing the teams started quarterbacking with Tracy Ham who retired after the season. After a great season, they lost a close East Final to the Hamilton Tiger-Cats 27–26, again being denied a shot at playing for the Grey Cup.

== Preseason ==
| Game | Date | Opponent | Results | | Venue | Attendance |
| Game | Date | Opponent | Score | Record | Venue | Attendance |
|---|---|---|---|---|---|---|
| A | June 24 | at Winnipeg Blue Bombers | W 18–12 | 1–0 | Winnipeg Stadium | 30,593 |
| B | June 30 | vs. Toronto Argonauts | L 15–23 | 1–1 | Molson Stadium | 14,989 |

== Regular season ==
=== Season standings ===
East Division
| Pos | Team | Pld | W | L | T | PF | PA | PD | Pts |
|---|---|---|---|---|---|---|---|---|---|
| 1 | Montreal Alouettes (C, Q) | 18 | 12 | 6 | 0 | 495 | 395 | +100 | 24 |
| 2 | Hamilton Tiger-Cats (Q) | 18 | 11 | 7 | 0 | 603 | 378 | +225 | 22 |
| 3 | Toronto Argonauts (Q) | 18 | 9 | 9 | 0 | 386 | 373 | +13 | 18 |
| 4 | Winnipeg Blue Bombers | 18 | 6 | 12 | 0 | 362 | 601 | −239 | 12 |

Source: "1999 CFL regular season standings". Archived from the original on 2009-06-29.
(C) First round bye; (Q) Qualified for playoffs

=== Season schedule ===
| Week | Game | Date | Opponent | Results | | Venue | Attendance |
| Week | Game | Date | Opponent | Score | Record | Venue | Attendance |
|---|---|---|---|---|---|---|---|
| 1 | 1 | July 10 | at Toronto Argonauts | W 15–12 | 1–0 | SkyDome | 21,028 |
| 2 | 2 | July 16 | at Hamilton Tiger-Cats | W 22–16 | 2–0 | Ivor Wynne Stadium | 18,352 |
| 3 | 3 | July 22 | vs. Winnipeg Blue Bombers | W 30–18 | 3–0 | Molson Stadium | 18,199 |
| 4 | 4 | July 29 | vs. Calgary Stampeders | L 17–38 | 3–1 | Molson Stadium | 19,443 |
| 5 | 5 | Aug 6 | at Edmonton Eskimos | W 20–13 | 4–1 | Commonwealth Stadium | 33,154 |
| 6 | 6 | Aug 12 | vs. Hamilton Tiger-Cats | W 24–17 | 5–1 | Molson Stadium | 19,461 |
| 7 | 7 | Aug 20 | at Toronto Argonauts | L 20–23 | 5–2 | SkyDome | 20,152 |
| 8 | 8 | Aug 27 | vs. Toronto Argonauts | W 20–5 | 6–2 | Molson Stadium | 19,461 |
| 9 | 9 | Sept 2 | at BC Lions | L 23–44 | 6–3 | BC Place | 19,724 |
| 10 | 10 | Sept 12 | vs. Hamilton Tiger-Cats | W 52–19 | 7–3 | Molson Stadium | 19,461 |
| 11 | 11 | Sept 19 | vs. BC Lions | W 21–12 | 8–3 | Molson Stadium | 19,461 |
| 12 | 12 | Sept 25 | at Hamilton Tiger-Cats | L 13–39 | 8–4 | Ivor Wynne Stadium | 20,648 |
| 13 | 13 | Oct 3 | at Saskatchewan Roughriders | W 41–26 | 9–4 | Taylor Field | 17,715 |
| 14 | 14 | Oct 11 | vs. Saskatchewan Roughriders | W 43–7 | 10–4 | Molson Stadium | 19,461 |
| 15 | 15 | Oct 17 | at Winnipeg Blue Bombers | L 29–32 | 10–5 | Winnipeg Stadium | 15,602 |
| 16 | 16 | Oct 23 | vs. Edmonton Eskimos | W 36–33 | 11–5 | Molson Stadium | 19,461 |
| 17 | 17 | Oct 31 | at Calgary Stampeders | L 24–31 | 11–6 | McMahon Stadium | 28,250 |
| 18 | 18 | Nov 7 | Winnipeg Blue Bombers | W 45–10 | 12–6 | Molson Stadium | 19,461 |

== Roster ==
1999 Montreal Alouettes final roster
| Quarterbacks: 13 Anthony Calvillo; 8 Tracy Ham; 1 Corby Jones; Running backs: 4 Thomas Haskins; 27 Mike Pringle; 22 Michael Soles; Receivers: 87 André Bolduc; 17 Alfonzo Browning; 86 Ben Cahoon; 82 Jock Climie; 84 Tyree Davis; 3 Sylvain Girard | Offensive linemen: 68 Bryan Chiu C; 69 Ryan Coughlin G/T; 66 Neal Fort T; 53 Uzooma Okeke T; 65 Mike Sutherland G/C; 59 Pierre Vercheval G; Defensive linemen: 90 Swift Burch DE; 98 Steve Charbonneau DE; 97 Tom Hipsz DT; 56 Elfrid Payton DE; 75 Ed Philion DT; 93 Jason Richards DT | Linebackers: 51 Sheldon Benoit; 50 Rahsaan Giddings; 7 Tracy Gravely; 47 Stefen Reid; 9 Edward Thomas; Defensive backs: 6 Hency Charles; 24 Dwight Henry; 18 Will Loftus; 31 Barron Miles; 11 Winston October; 2 Davis Sanchez; 21 Irvin Smith; 36 Les Smith; 23 Mark Washington | Special teams: 10 Terry Baker K/P; Injured list: 62 Scott Flory G; 30 Bruno Heppell FB; 55 Chris Hoople LB; 5 Stanley Jackson QB; 58 Selvesta Miller DE; 79 Yannick Semanou DT; Italics indicate American player |

== Playoffs ==
=== East Final ===
| Team | Q1 | Q2 | Q3 | Q4 | Total |
|---|---|---|---|---|---|
| Hamilton Tiger-Cats | ? | ? | ? | ? | 27 |
| Montreal Alouettes | ? | ? | ? | ? | 26 |

== Awards ==
=== 1999 CFL All-Star Selections ===
- Ben Cahoon – Slotback
- Barron Miles – Defensive Back
- Uzooma Okeke – Offensive Tackle
- Mike Pringle – Running Back
- Pierre Vercheval – Offensive Guard

=== 1999 CFL Eastern All-Star Selections ===
- Ben Cahoon – Slotback
- Mike Pringle – Running Back
- Pierre Vercheval – Offensive Guard
- Uzooma Okeke – Offensive Tackle
- Jason Richards – Defensive Tackle
- Elfrid Payton – Defensive End
- Irvin Smith – Cornerback
- Barron Miles – Defensive Back
