= Girado =

Girado is a surname. Notable people with the name include:

- King Girado (born 1980), Filipino singer, musician, model and actor
- Nina Girado (born 1980), Filipina singer, record producer, TV and radio personality
- Sebastián Girado (born 2004), Colombian footballer

== See also ==
- Giraldo
- Girodo
- Guirado
