= 1999 Saskatchewan Roughriders season =

CFL team season

- General manager: Alan Ford
- Head coach: Cal Murphy
- Home stadium: Taylor Field

Results
- Record: 3–15
- Division place: 4th, West
- Playoffs: did not qualify
- Team MOP: Mike Saunders
- Team MOC: Colin Scrivener
- Team MOR: Neal Smith

The 1999 Saskatchewan Roughriders finished in fourth place in the West Division with a 3–15 record and missed the playoffs. It was their worst record for a season in the current 18-game schedule and their worst since going 2–14 in the 1980 season.

== Offseason ==
=== CFL draft ===
Round	Pick	Player	Position	School/Club team
2	10	Stéphane Fortin	Safety	Indianapolis
3	18	Kennedy Nkeyasen	Running back	Idaho State
4	26	Matthew Hammer	Defensive back	Guelph
5	33	Eric Sanderson	Offensive tackle	York
6	41	Carlo Panaro	Offensive lineman	Alberta

=== Preseason ===
Week	Date	Opponent	Score	Result	Attendance
A	Wed, June 23	at Edmonton Eskimos	27–3	Loss	35,313
B	Tues, June 29	vs. Calgary Stampeders	34–24	Loss	18,591

== Regular season ==
=== Season standings ===
West Division
Pos	Team	Pld	W	L	T	PF	PA	PD	Pts
1	BC Lions (C, Q)	18	13	5	0	429	373	+56	26
2	Calgary Stampeders (Q)	18	12	6	0	503	393	+110	24
3	Edmonton Eskimos (Q)	18	6	12	0	459	502	−43	12
4	Saskatchewan Roughriders	18	3	15	0	370	592	−222	6

Source: "1999 CFL regular season standings". Archived from the original on 2009-06-29.
(C) First round bye; (Q) Qualified for playoffs

=== Season schedule ===
Week	Date	Opponent	Score	Result	Attendance	Record
1	Wed, July 7	at Calgary Stampeders	L 18–28	0–1		31,878
2	Fri, July 16	at Edmonton Eskimos	L 6–39	0–2		32,113
3	Fri, July 23	vs. BC Lions	L 21–32	0–3		19,785
4	Fri, July 30	vs. Toronto Argonauts	W 20–15	1–3		18,256
5	Thur, Aug 5	at Hamilton Tiger-Cats	L 17–63	1–4		16,423
6	Fri, Aug 13	vs. Calgary Stampeders	L 22–37	1–5		19,545
7	Fri, Aug 20	vs. Edmonton Eskimos	W 29–27	2–5		16,554
8	Thur, Aug 26	at BC Lions	L 21–28	2–6		21,617
9	Sun, Sept 5	vs. Winnipeg Blue Bombers	W 42–17	3–6		29,249
10	Sat, Sept 11	at Toronto Argonauts	L 3–28	3–7		17,216
11	Fri, Sept 17	vs. Edmonton Eskimos	L 38–41	3–8		18,231
12	Fri, Sept 24	at Winnipeg Blue Bombers	L 18–24	3–9		18,727
13	Sun, Oct 3	vs. Montreal Alouettes	L 26–41	3–10		17,715
14	Mon, Oct 11	at Montreal Alouettes	L 7–43	3–11		19,461
15	Sun, Oct 17	vs. Calgary Stampeders	L 31–34	3–12		16,448
16	Sun, Oct 24	vs. Hamilton Tiger-Cats	L 12–42	3–13		18,166
17	Sat, Oct 30	at Edmonton Eskimos	L 21–34	3–14		33,850
18	Fri, Nov 5	at BC Lions	L 18–19	3–15		19,378

== Roster ==
1999 Saskatchewan Roughriders final roster
Quarterbacks: 6 John Rayborn; 12 Steve Sarkisian; Running backs: 19 Mike Maurer; 20 Kennedy Nkeyasen; 33 Chris Szarka; 14 Ricky Whittle; Receivers: 10 Dan Farthing; 83 Reggie Jones; 89 Curtis Mayfield; 80 Don Narcisse; 88 Ousmane Tounkara	Offensive linemen: 67 Dan Comiskey G; 52 Ben Fairbrother G; 50 Rob Lazeo G; 60 Gene Makowsky T; 59 James Monroe C; 54 Jeremy O'Day G/C; 51 John Terry T; Defensive linemen: 94 Steve Conley DE; 93 Michael Lawson DT; 64 Rob Robinson DT; 72 Colin Scrivener DT; 99 Neal Smith DE; 43 R-Kal Truluck DE	Linebackers: 96 Deli Ali; 53 Shay Muirbrook; 39 Willie Pless; 74 Dan Rashovich; 45 Randy Srochenski LS; Defensive backs: 21 Doug Craft; 24 Ventson Donelson; 27 Stéphane Fortin; 25 Curtis Galick; 16 Shannon Garrett; 11 Paul Girodo; 9 Todd McMillon	Special teams: 4 Paul McCallum K/P; Injured list: 37 Ken Benson LB; 35 Shawn Daniels FB; 68 Andrew Greene G/T; 84 Eric Guliford WR; 38 Brendan Rogers LB; 26 Glenn Rogers DB; 32 Mike Saunders RB; 17 Reggie Slack QB; 48 Trevis Smith LB; 91 Nelson Van Waes DT; Italics indicate American player

== Awards and records ==
=== CFL All-Star selections ===
- None

=== Western All-Star selections ===
- Willie Pless, Linebacker
- Neal Smith, Defensive End
- John Terry, Offensive Tackle
