= 1999 Winnipeg Blue Bombers season =

Canadian football team season

- Head coach: Dave Ritchie
- Home stadium: Winnipeg Stadium

Results
- Record: 6–12
- Division place: 4th, East
- Playoffs: did not qualify

Uniform

The 1999 Winnipeg Blue Bombers finished in fourth place in the East Division with a 6–12 record and failed to make the playoffs.

== Offseason ==
=== CFL draft ===
Round	Pick	Player	Position	School

== Regular season ==
=== Season standings ===
East Division
Pos	Team	Pld	W	L	T	PF	PA	PD	Pts
1	Montreal Alouettes (C, Q)	18	12	6	0	495	395	+100	24
2	Hamilton Tiger-Cats (Q)	18	11	7	0	603	378	+225	22
3	Toronto Argonauts (Q)	18	9	9	0	386	373	+13	18
4	Winnipeg Blue Bombers	18	6	12	0	362	601	−239	12

Source: "1999 CFL regular season standings". Archived from the original on 2009-06-29.
(C) First round bye; (Q) Qualified for playoffs

=== Season schedule ===
Week	Date	Opponent	Result	Record
1	July 8	vs. Hamilton Tiger-Cats	L 9–39	0–1
2	July 15	vs. Toronto Argonauts	W 47–27	1–1
3	July 22	at Montreal Alouettes	L 18–30	1–2
4	July 29	at BC Lions	W 30–18	2–2
5	Aug 6	at Toronto Argonauts	L 7–40	2–3
6	Aug 13	vs. Edmonton Eskimos	L 26–56	2–4
7	Aug 19	at Calgary Stampeders	L 17–29	2–5
8	Aug 26	vs. Calgary Stampeders	L 11–36	2–6
9	Sept 5	at Saskatchewan Roughriders	L 17–42	2–7
10	Sept 12	vs. BC Lions	L 16–20	2–8
11	Sept 18	at Hamilton Tiger-Cats	L 15–65	2–9
12	Sept 24	vs. Saskatchewan Roughriders	W 24–18	3–9
13	Oct 3	at Edmonton Eskimos	W 27–19	4–9
14	Oct 10	vs. Hamilton Tiger-Cats	L 16–43	4–10
15	Oct 17	vs. Montreal Alouettes	W 32–29	5–10
16	Oct 22	at Toronto Argonauts	L 23–32	5–11
17	Oct 29	vs. Toronto Argonauts	W 18–13	6–11
18	Nov 7	at Montreal Alouettes	L 10–45	6–12

== Roster ==
1999 Winnipeg Blue Bombers final roster
Quarterbacks: 10 Brian Ah Yat; 12 Kerwin Bell; 16 Troy Kopp; Running backs: 4 Paul Blackwood; 20 Deland McCullough; 30 Brad Yamaoka; Receivers: 81 Chris Armstrong; 23 Bruce Boyko; 5 Matt DuBuc; 84 Bob Gordon; 80 Geroy Simon; 82 Nigel Williams	Offensive linemen: 51 Pat Kesi T; 57 Brett MacNeil G; 66 Mike Mihelic G; 62 Chris Perez T; 64 Gary Sawatzky C; 60 Dave Vankoughnett C; Defensive linemen: 76 Joe Fleming DT; 40 Bennie Goods DT; 91 Tyrone Rodgers DE; 72 Glen Scrivener DE/DT; 99 Wayne Weathers DE; Special teams: 6 Bob Cameron P; 7 Troy Westwood K	Linebackers: 53 Phil Curry; 50 Steve Glenn; 38 Doug Hocking; 27 Eric Johnson; 45 Trevor Ludtke; 54 Wade Miller; 15 Henry Newby; Defensive backs: 13 Tom Europe; 14 Rashid Gayle; 3 Brandon Hamilton; 24 Maurice Kelly; 18 Spencer McLennan; 0 Harold Nash; 17 Eddie Lee Thomas	Injured list: 1 Brad Elberg RB; 9 Cory Philpot RB; 83 Joseph Rogers WR; 85 Milt Stegall SB; 73 Andrew Stewart DE; Suspended: 8 Andre Strode DB; Italics indicate International player

== Awards and records ==
=== 1999 CFL All-Stars ===
- LB – Maurice Kelley, CFL All-Star

=== Eastern All-Star Selections ===
- SB – Milt Stegall, CFL Eastern All-Star
- WR – Robert Gordon, CFL Eastern All-Star
- ST – Wade Miller, CFL Eastern All-Star
- LB – Maurice Kelley, CFL Eastern All-Star
