= 1999 Calgary Stampeders season =

Canadian football team season

- Owner: Sig Gutsche
- General manager: Wally Buono
- Head coach: Wally Buono
- Home stadium: McMahon Stadium

Results
- Record: 12–6
- Division place: 2nd, West
- Playoffs: Lost Grey Cup

Uniform

The 1999 Calgary Stampeders finished in second place in the West Division with a 12–6 record. They attempted to repeat as Grey Cup champions but lost to the Hamilton Tiger-Cats.

== Offseason ==
=== CFL draft ===
| Rd | Pick | Player | Position | School |
|---|---|---|---|---|
| 1 | 8 | Bobby Singh | OL | Portland State |
| 2 | 16 | Cameron Legault | DT | Carleton |
| 3 | 24 | Evan Davis | RB | Concordia |
| 5 | 39 | Dan Disley | WR | Western Ontario |
| 6 | 46 | Andy Kolaczek | OL | Calgary |

== Preseason ==
| Week | Date | Opponent | Result | Record | Attendance |
|---|---|---|---|---|---|
| A | June 23 | vs. BC Lions | W 24–21 | 1–0 | 30,089 |
| B | June 29 | at Saskatchewan Roughriders | W 34–24 | 2–0 | 18,591 |

== Regular season ==
=== Season standings ===
West Division
| Pos | Team | Pld | W | L | T | PF | PA | PD | Pts |
|---|---|---|---|---|---|---|---|---|---|
| 1 | BC Lions (C, Q) | 18 | 13 | 5 | 0 | 429 | 373 | +56 | 26 |
| 2 | Calgary Stampeders (Q) | 18 | 12 | 6 | 0 | 503 | 393 | +110 | 24 |
| 3 | Edmonton Eskimos (Q) | 18 | 6 | 12 | 0 | 459 | 502 | −43 | 12 |
| 4 | Saskatchewan Roughriders | 18 | 3 | 15 | 0 | 370 | 592 | −222 | 6 |

Source: "1999 CFL regular season standings". Archived from the original on 2009-06-29.
(C) First round bye; (Q) Qualified for playoffs

=== Season schedule ===
| Date | Opponent | Result | Record |
|---|---|---|---|
| July 7 | vs. Saskatchewan Roughriders | W 28–18 | 1–0 |
| July 15 | at BC Lions | L 27–37 | 1–1 |
| July 22 | vs. Edmonton Eskimos | W 41–37 | 2–1 |
| July 29 | at Montreal Alouettes | W 38–17 | 3–1 |
| August 5 | vs. BC Lions | L 9–13 | 3–2 |
| August 13 | at Saskatchewan Roughriders | W 37–22 | 4–2 |
| August 19 | vs. Winnipeg Blue Bombers | W 29–18 | 5–2 |
| August 26 | at Winnipeg Blue Bombers | W 36–11 | 6–2 |
| September 6 | Edmonton Eskimos | L 30–33 | 6–3 |
| September 10 | at Edmonton Eskimos | W 38–13 | 7–3 |
| September 18 | vs. Toronto Argonauts | W 29–26 | 8–3 |
| September 25 | at BC Lions | L 20–21 | 8–4 |
| October 1 | vs. Hamilton Tiger-Cats | W 21–17 | 9–4 |
| October 9 | at Toronto Argonauts | L 13–24 | 9–5 |
| October 17 | at Saskatchewan Roughriders | W 34–31 | 10–5 |
| October 24 | vs. BC Lions | W 14–1 | 11–5 |
| October 31 | vs. Montreal Alouettes | W 31–24 | 12–5 |
| November 6 | at Hamilton Tiger-Cats | L 28–31 | 12–6 |

== Awards and records ==
=== Offence ===
- RB – Kelvin Anderson
- SB – Allen Pitts
- WR – Travis Moore
- OT – Rocco Romano

=== Defence ===
- CB – William Hampton

=== Special teams ===
- K – Mark McLoughlin

=== Offence ===
- RB – Kelvin Anderson
- SB – Terry Vaughn
- SB – Allen Pitts
- WR – Travis Moore
- OT – Rocco Romano

=== Defence ===
- CB – William Hampton, Calgary Stampeders
- DB – Jack Kellogg, Calgary Stampeders
- DS – Greg Frers, Calgary Stampeders

=== Special teams ===
- K – Mark McLoughlin, Calgary Stampeders

== Playoffs ==
=== West Semi-Final ===
| Team | Q1 | Q2 | Q3 | Q4 | Total |
|---|---|---|---|---|---|
| Edmonton Eskimos | 0 | 3 | 7 | 7 | 17 |
| Calgary Stampeders | 7 | 14 | 6 | 3 | 30 |

=== West Final ===
| Team | Q1 | Q2 | Q3 | Q4 | Total |
|---|---|---|---|---|---|
| Calgary Stampeders | 10 | 13 | 0 | 3 | 26 |
| BC Lions | 0 | 7 | 10 | 7 | 24 |

=== Grey Cup ===
| Team | Q1 | Q2 | Q3 | Q4 | Total |
|---|---|---|---|---|---|
| Hamilton Tiger-Cats | 10 | 11 | 4 | 7 | 32 |
| Calgary Stampeders | 0 | 0 | 7 | 14 | 21 |

== Roster ==
1999 Calgary Stampeders final roster
| Quarterbacks: 15 Dave Dickenson; 19 Mike McCoy; 2 Oteman Sampson; Running backs: 34 Duane Forde; Receivers: 82 Andre Arlain; 87 Aubrey Cummings; 88 Vince Danielsen; 85 Dan Disley; 8 Marcus Dowdell; 83 Travis Moore; 18 Allen Pitts | Offensive linemen: 68 Freddie Childress G; 67 Jamie Crysdale C; 50 Jay McNeil G; 63 Rohn Meyer T; 53 Tom Rayam T; 59 Rocco Romano T; Defensive linemen: 92 Steve Anderson DE; 91 Mark Gunn DT; 98 Cameron Legault DT; 95 Jermaine Miles DE; 93 Marc Pilon DT; 94 Jeff Traversy DT | Linebackers: 33 Ray Biggs; 6 Jason Clemett; 4 Darryl Hall; 51 Alondra Johnson; 44 Kevin Johnson; 31 Roger Reinson; Defensive backs: 17 Marvin Coleman; 26 Shad Criss; 12 Greg Frers; 21 William Hampton; 9 Aldi Henry; 3 Jackie Kellogg; 27 Eric Sutton | Special teams: 11 Tony Martino P; 13 Mark McLoughlin K; Injured list: 32 Kelvin Anderson RB; 16 Henry Burris QB; 29 Eddie Davis DB; 84 Ray Jacobs DT/DE; 62 Jung-Yul Kim G; 14 Rock Preston RB; Suspended: 96 Bronzell Miller DE; 56 Shonte Peoples DE; Italics indicate International player |
