= J. P. Darche =

Canadian football player (born 1975)

No. 52, 51
- Position: Long snapper

Personal information
- Born: February 28, 1975 (age 51); Montreal, Quebec, Canada
- Listed height: 6 ft 0 in (1.83 m)
- Listed weight: 242 lb (110 kg)

Career information
- High school: Collège Notre-Dame du Sacré-Cœur (Montreal, Quebec)
- College: Collège André-Grasset
- University: McGill
- NFL draft: 1999: undrafted
- CFL draft: 1999: 3rd round, 21st overall pick

Career history
- Toronto Argonauts (1999); Seattle Seahawks (2000–2006); Kansas City Chiefs (2007–2008)

Awards and highlights
- PFWA All-Rookie Team (2000); Collège André-Grasset Jersey retired (#44); Russ Jackson Award (1998)

Career NFL statistics
- Games played: 120
- Total tackles: 21
- Forced fumbles: 1
- Fumble recoveries: 1
- Stats at Pro Football Reference

Jean-Philippe "J. P." Darche (born February 28, 1975) is a Canadian former professional football player who was a long snapper. He was signed and drafted by the Toronto Argonauts in 1999. He played CIS football at McGill.

Darche has also played for the Seattle Seahawks and Kansas City Chiefs. He is the older brother of Mathieu Darche, a former National Hockey League player and current general manager of the New York Islanders.

== Early life ==
Born in Montreal, Quebec, Canada, Darche's first love was ice hockey. As a youth, along with hockey, he played Bantam AA inter-city baseball with the St-Laurent Orioles. Hockey was his primary sport until high school, when he started playing American football. Darche's younger brother Mathieu is a retired hockey player of the National Hockey League. Darche attended Collège Notre-Dame du Sacré-Coeur in Montreal. He was a letterman in football. In football, after his senior season, he was voted to participate in the High School of Montreal All-Star football game.

== College career ==
Darche attended Collège André-Grasset and was an honour student and named Athlete of the Year in his second year. His number 44 jersey was retired by the team.

== University career ==
Darche attended McGill University in Montreal where he was a star middle linebacker on the McGill Redmen football team for five seasons. He was selected as a co-captain during his final two seasons. He concluded his collegiate career as the all-time leading tackler in school history with 272 stops (132 solo). He graduated from McGill with a BSc. in physiology in 1998, then entered McGill Medical School for two years before entering the Canadian Football League in 1999. In 1998, he captured the Russ Jackson Award as the Canadian university football player who best combines athletics with academics and community service.

== Professional career ==
=== Toronto Argonauts ===
After playing five seasons for McGill, Darche turned pro with the Toronto Argonauts of the Canadian Football League in the 1999 CFL season. He was selected in the third round of the 1999 CFL draft, the first linebacker selected that year, and signed with the team on June 4, 1999, just in time to report for training camp. He recorded 16 special teams tackles in 16 regular season games and one playoff game over the 1999 Toronto Argonauts season, the most of anyone on the team.

=== Seattle Seahawks ===
He played one season as a long snapper with the Argonauts before signing with the NFL's Seattle Seahawks in 2000. He became the second Canadian Interuniversity Sport graduate to play in the Super Bowl when he participated in Super Bowl XL in 2006. At the beginning of the 2006 season, he was named one of the Seahawks' captains. He was released by the Seahawks in February 2007 after a hip injury in the 2006 NFL season. In his seven seasons in Seattle, he played in 97 games, recording 18 special teams tackles. He also had one fumble recovery and one forced fumble on special teams. The fumble recovery in 2005 ensured that the Seahawks would win in St. Louis for the first time since 1997.

=== Kansas City Chiefs ===
He was signed by the Kansas City Chiefs in March 2007 after Kendall Gammon retired. He got hurt during the 2008 season and spent the remainder of the year on injured reserve. Darche was then released on March 19, 2009.

== Post NFL career ==
After not being signed for the 2009 NFL season, Darche decided to retire from football and continue his studies in medicine at the University of Kansas. He has been named to the Alpha Omega Alpha Honour Medical Society. He finished a fellowship in sports medicine and practices at the University of Kansas Health System. He is also a team physician for his former team, the Kansas City Chiefs.
