= Jackson Preparatory School =

Independent school in Flowood, Mississippi, US

Location
- 3100 Lakeland Drive; Flowood, Mississippi; United States; 32°19′59″N 90°6′30″W

Information
- Type: Independent
- Motto: Scholarship, Service, Character, Leadership
- Established: 1970
- Founder: Marshall Fortenberry
- Head of school: Lawrence M. Coco, III
- Head of Upper School: Hunter Upchurch
- Faculty: 103
- Grades: Pre-K3 through 12
- Gender: Coeducational
- Enrollment: 804 (2023–24)
- Campus size: 90 acres (36 ha)
- Colors: Blue and red
- Athletics: Baseball, Basketball, Cross Country, Golf, Soccer, Tennis, Football, Swimming, Track & Field, Softball, Cheerleading, Dance, Volleyball
- Mascot: Patriot
- Nickname: Prep
- Newspaper: The Sentry
- Yearbook: Précis
- Affiliations: National Association of Independent Schools, Southern Association of Independent Schools, Southern Association of Colleges and Schools, The College Board, National Association of College Admissions Counselors, Southern Association of College Admissions Counselors, Cum Laude Society and the Mississippi Association of Independent Schools.
- Literary magazine: Earthwinds and Mindprints
- Performing arts: Annual Fall Musical, Annual Spring Play, Middle School (5th-8th) Showchoir (Fusion), Upper School (9th-12th) Showchoir (Reveillon and Fusion)
- Website: Homepage

Jackson Preparatory School (Jackson Prep) is a private school in Flowood, Mississippi, a suburb of Jackson.

== History ==
The school was founded in 1970 as a segregation academy. A biography of James Meredith cited the school's creation as part of the campaign of massive resistance against the Brown v. Board of Education decision ordering racial integration of public schools. At the time of its founding, a local member of the White Citizen's Council remarked that schools like Jackson Prep were established because the "educational results of such forced interracial congregation are disastrous for children of both the white and black races".

A 1973 Yale Law Journal article characterized Jackson Prep as "second generation segregation academy" since the student body lacked both black and low income white students, but unlike so called "rebel yell academies", employed competent staff offering a complete academic program and sought the same elite status as traditional upper class day schools in the rest of the country. As of 1978, Jackson Prep was not a charity and operated as a profit-making institution.

In 1981, Jackson Prep headmaster Jesse Howell said the school was established because the "upheaval" white parents experienced from desegregation "caused a need for stability, for a place to send their children. We've tried to provide that." Howell claimed not to know why Jackson Prep had never enrolled any black students. As of 1986, Jackson Prep still had never enrolled a black student. Howell told a newspaper that the lack of diversity was because "black communities don't choose to attend our school." A black parent disagreed, saying that he didn't enroll his sons because "Jackson Prep was formed in 1970 to try to maintain segregation."

In a 1995 article in the Clarion Ledger, Howell said that "there was resistance from both sides" to school integration. Gail Sweat, a student who had attended Jackson Preparatory before transferring back to a racially integrated public school, said that, in 1970, "initially there was panic, and most whites bailed out and went to private schools." However, leaving Jackson Preparatory was what "prepared her to live in a diverse society." Sweat added that, after leaving Jackson Preparatory "it wasn't that big a deal, blacks and whites going to school together."

In 1999, it was reported that Jackson Prep required pregnant students to withdraw from the school. As of 2014, Jackson Prep's student body remained over 97 percent white.

=== Role in elections ===
In the 1987 Mississippi gubernatorial election, Bill Waller was criticized for sending two of his children to the "all-white" Jackson Preparatory School. In 1989, Jackson Mayor Dale Danks was similarly criticized for enrolling his daughter in Jackson Prep.

In 1999, Madison County school board member Lee Miller acknowledged that his decision to enroll his children in Jackson Prep may have come across as "nebulous," but insisted the decision was not motivated by racial bias. In the article, Miller explained that the decision was the result of prayer, stating that if someone did not have a relationship with God, they might think this reasoning 'nebulous,' but if they did, they would understand completely.

== Football ==
Jackson Prep competes as the Patriots, in the Mississippi Association of Independent Schools (MAIS), and currently competes in District 1 of the 6A Division. Jackson Prep is also the only school in MAIS history to win seven championship titles in a row within their division (2013-2019).

When Jackson Prep was established in 1970, the Murrah High School football coach moved to Jackson Prep, along with all the white players. The Murrah High School weight room equipment was also transferred to Jackson Prep since the booster club said that the equipment belonged to the club and not to the Jackson Public School District.

In 1978, NFL coach Romeo Crennel was working as an assistant at Ole Miss and visited Jackson Prep to scout a player. Crennel later recalled that he was the first black person to attend a game at the school and that he had used the alias "Romano Crenelli" to disguise his racial background.

=== Coach Ricky Black ===
Hired in 1997, Coach Ricky Black was named the National High School Athletic Coaches Association's Coach of The Year in 2018. In his first 21 seasons, Coach Black won 10 MAIS state championships. He would go on to become only the second Mississippi high-school football coach to surpass 400 total wins. He was inducted into the Mississippi Sports Hall of Fame in 2019.

Coach Black stepped down as the head coach at Jackson Prep in February 2021. His 24-season tenure at Jackson Prep concluded with a 263-44 overall record, an 85.6 winning percentage.

=== Post-Black Era ===
In March 2021, Jackson Prep hired Coach Tyler Turner from Goodpasture Christian School in Madison, Tennessee. From 2017 to 2019, Turner was head coach at Olive Branch High School and before that was head coach at Liberty Technology Magnet High School, where he led the team to the state championship game. Coach Turner finished the 2021-2022 season at Jackson Prep with an 8-5 (3-2) record. He was dismissed by the school in January 2022.

The Jackson Prep administration hired Coach Doug Goodwin as the head football coach in February 2022. A former assistant with both the University of Mississippi and Auburn University in the NCAA, Coach Goodwin also coached for 27 years in high-schools in Alabama. Inducted in 2015, he is a member of Alabama High School Athletic Association Hall of Fame.

== Performing arts ==
Jackson Prep has two competitive show choirs, the upper school-level Revellion and the middle school-level Fusion. The program has hosted a competition since 2014, coinciding with the opening of a new theater.

== Notable alumni ==
- Jerrion Ealy, football player
- Konnor Griffin, baseball player
- Paul Lacoste, football player
- Jake Mangum, baseball player
- Charlie Mars, musician
- Dent May, musician
- Will Overstreet, football player
- Billy Puckett, football player
- Jonathan Randolph, professional golfer
- Kathryn Stockett, author
- Scott Stricklin, athletic director
- Ken Toler, football player
- Todd Wade, football player
- Will Warren, baseball player
- Swayze Waters, football player

== See also ==
- List of private schools in Mississippi
