= Jonas Seawright =

American football player (born 1982)

No. 75, 69, 92
- Position: Defensive tackle

Personal information
- Born: April 12, 1982 (age 44)
- Listed height: 6 ft 6 in (1.98 m)
- Listed weight: 335 lb (152 kg)

Career information
- High school: Orangeburg-Wilkinson (Orangeburg, South Carolina)
- College: North Carolina
- NFL draft: 2005: undrafted

Career history
- New York Giants (2005–2006); Dallas Cowboys (2009)*; New York Sentinels (2009); Hartford Colonials (2010); Sacramento Mountain Lions (2011); San Antonio Talons (2012)
- * Offseason or practice squad member only

Career NFL statistics
- Total tackles: 1
- Stats at Pro Football Reference

Jonas Salley Seawright (born April 12, 1982) is an American former professional football player who was a defensive tackle in the National Football League (NFL). He was signed by the New York Giants as an undrafted free agent in 2005. He played college football for the North Carolina Tar Heels.

Seawright was also a member of the Dallas Cowboys, New York Sentinels and Hartford Colonials.

== Early life ==
Seawright attended Orangeburg Wilkinson High School in Orangeburg, South Carolina and was a letterman in football. In football, he was a two-year starter, and was an All-State honoree as a senior. As a junior, he posted 175 tackles and 5 sacks.

== College career ==
During his college years, he played for University of North Carolina. During Seawright's freshman season, he played against Clemson, and Maryland. He was also redshirted in 2000. The following year, Jonas played some time on the offensive line, but soon switched back to DT. During this season, he appeared in 11 games, and played an extensive amount of time against Wake Forest, where he made 1 tackle. This year, he gained 7 tackles, 2 of which were solo, while 5 were assists. In a season finale against Duke, Seawright made 3 tackles. He also 2 tackles from a game against Clemson. Seawright's junior year he played in all 12 games, starting 6 of them, against teams such as Florida State, Syracuse, Wisconsin, Virginia, East Carolina, and Arizona State. He ended the year having 10 tackles, 5 of which were primary stops, and the other 5 were assists. This year, Seawright had 3 blocked kicks. These include a blocked extra point against Florida State, and Arizona State. The other was a blocked field goal in the Wake Forest game. Seawright also recorded 2 tackles against Syracuse and Duke.

== Professional career ==
=== New York Giants ===
Seawright made the 53 man roster in 2006 for the New York Giants and played in nine games, but in 2007 the Giants, with many talented defensive lineman, made the decision to cut him.

=== Dallas Cowboys ===
Seawright was signed by the Dallas Cowboys on May 18, 2009.
