= Girodo =

Girodo is a surname. Notable people with the surname include:

- Chad Girodo (born 1991), American baseball player
- Paul Girodo (born 1973), Canadian football player
