= Orangeburg-Wilkinson High School =

Location
- 825 Cook Rd; Orangeburg, South Carolina 29118; United States; 33°31′26″N 80°50′11″W

Information
- Type: Public
- Established: 1971 (55 years ago)
- School district: Orangeburg County School District
- Principal: Dr. Patricia Moultrie–Goldsmith
- Grades: 9–12
- Enrollment: 1,000~ (2025–2026)
- Colors: Maroon, orange, and white
- Mascot: Bruin
- Website: owhs.ocsdsc.org

Orangeburg-Wilkinson High School is located in Orangeburg, South Carolina.

It is a part of the Orangeburg County School District. It is home to the Mighty Bruins/Bruinettes and also an International Baccalaureate World School.

== History and Overview ==
Orangeburg-Wilkinson High School was formed in 1971 following the merger of the former all-white Orangeburg High School and the all-black Wilkinson High School as part of local school integration efforts. The school originally operated at its Bruin Parkway campus.

In May 2022, Orangeburg County voters approved a $190 million bond referendum to fund school construction across the district. The Orangeburg County School Board subsequently approved building the new high school facility off Cook Road. Groundbreaking for the new campus took place on April 18, 2024.

In May 2023, the Orangeburg County School District approved plans to build a new campus for Orangeburg-Wilkinson High School on Cook Road, funded by a $190 million bond referendum. Groundbreaking for the new facility took place on April 18, 2024. Construction was completed in mid-2026 at a cost of over $55 million.

After two years of construction, the district held an official ribbon-cutting ceremony for the new $121 million campus on July 24, 2026. The modern facility features state-of-the-art classroom spaces and a 3,000-seat gymnasium, officially opening to students for the start of the 2026–2027 school year on August 3, 2026.

Delano Middleton, a student at Wilkinson High School, was one of those killed in the Orangeburg Massacre.

Rivalry between Bloods gang members and Folk Nation members escalated into a fight that lead to three students being shot and wounded on the school campus on Aug. 18, 2021; a 14-year-old male shot the students on the front lawn area of the school, and was later charged in adult court with three counts of attempted murder.

== Media appearances ==
In 2016, the school was featured in the six-part BBC documentary series Segregated America: A School in the South.

== Notable alumni ==
=== Miscellaneous ===
- Shelton Benjamin, professional wrestler signed to the WWE, was a 2x NCAA wrestling All-American at the University of Minnesota
- Beverly Buchanan, artist
- Marianna W. Davis, professor and author who wrote about black women
- Michael Hackett, professional basketball player
- Jaime Harrison, politician, chair of the South Carolina Democratic Party (2013–2017) and Democratic National Committee (2021–2025)
- Mike O'Cain, American football coach
- Eugene Robinson, newspaper columnist and an associate editor of The Washington Post
- Bakari Sellers, politician
- Mike Sharperson, MLB infielder and 2x World Series champion
- Herm Winningham, MLB player and 1990 World Series champion with the Cincinnati Reds

=== NFL players ===
- Donnie Abraham, NFL cornerback and Pro Bowl selection in 2000
- Alex Barron, NFL offensive tackle
- Woodrow Dantzler, NFL running back and safety
- Arturo Freeman, NFL safety
- Deveron Harper, NFL defensive back
- Dwayne Harper, NFL cornerback
- Albert Huggins, NFL defensive tackle, 2x CFP National Champion with Clemson
- Tim Jennings, NFL cornerback and 2x Pro Bowl selection
- Maurice Kelly, NFL and Canadian Football League defensive back
- Max Runager, NFL punter and 2x Super Bowl champion,
- Rusty Russell, NFL and Arena Football League offensive tackle
- Jonas Seawright, NFL defensive tackle
