= Mace Freeman =

Canadian gridiron football player (born 1976)

No. 29
- Positions: Slotback, return specialist

Personal information
- Born: January 20, 1976 (age 50); Montreal, Quebec, Canada
- Listed height: 5 ft 9 in (1.75 m)
- Listed weight: 180 lb (82 kg)

Career information
- High school: Lorne Park (Mississauga, Ontario)
- College: Toledo (1994–1998)
- NFL draft: 1999: undrafted
- CFL draft: 1999: undrafted

Career history
- Hamilton Tiger-Cats (1999–2002); Montreal Alouettes (2003)*
- * Offseason or practice squad member only

Awards and highlights
- Grey Cup champion (1999)

Career CFL statistics
- Games played: 37
- Receptions: 14
- Receiving yards: 169
- Receiving average: 12.1
- Return yards: 539
- Stats at CFL.ca

Mace Freeman (born January 20, 1976) is a Canadian former professional football slotback and return specialist who played for the Hamilton Tiger-Cats of the Canadian Football League (CFL). He played college football for the Toledo Rockets.

== Early life ==
Freeman was born on January 20, 1976, in Montreal, Quebec, Canada. He attended Lorne Park Secondary School in Mississauga, Ontario. Freeman committed to play college football for the University of Toledo.

== College career ==
Freeman played college football for the Toledo Rockets from 1994 to 1998 and was a four-year letterman from 1995 to 1998. In 41 games, he had 87 receptions for 1,087 yards and nine touchdowns with 41 rushing yards. Freeman also had 719 return yards and was an All-Big 10 honorable mention in 1998.

== Professional career ==
=== Hamilton Tiger-Cats ===
After going undrafted in the 1999 NFL draft and 1999 CFL draft, Freeman signed with the Hamilton Tiger-Cats as an undrafted free agent. He served as the team's backup slotback and return specialist for four seasons. In 37 games, Freeman had 14 catches for 169 yards and 539 return yards. He became a free agent following the 2002 season.

=== Montreal Alouettes ===
On January 28, 2003, Freeman was signed by the Montreal Alouettes. On June 12, he was released by the team.
