= Dan Giancola =

Canadian football player (born 1970)

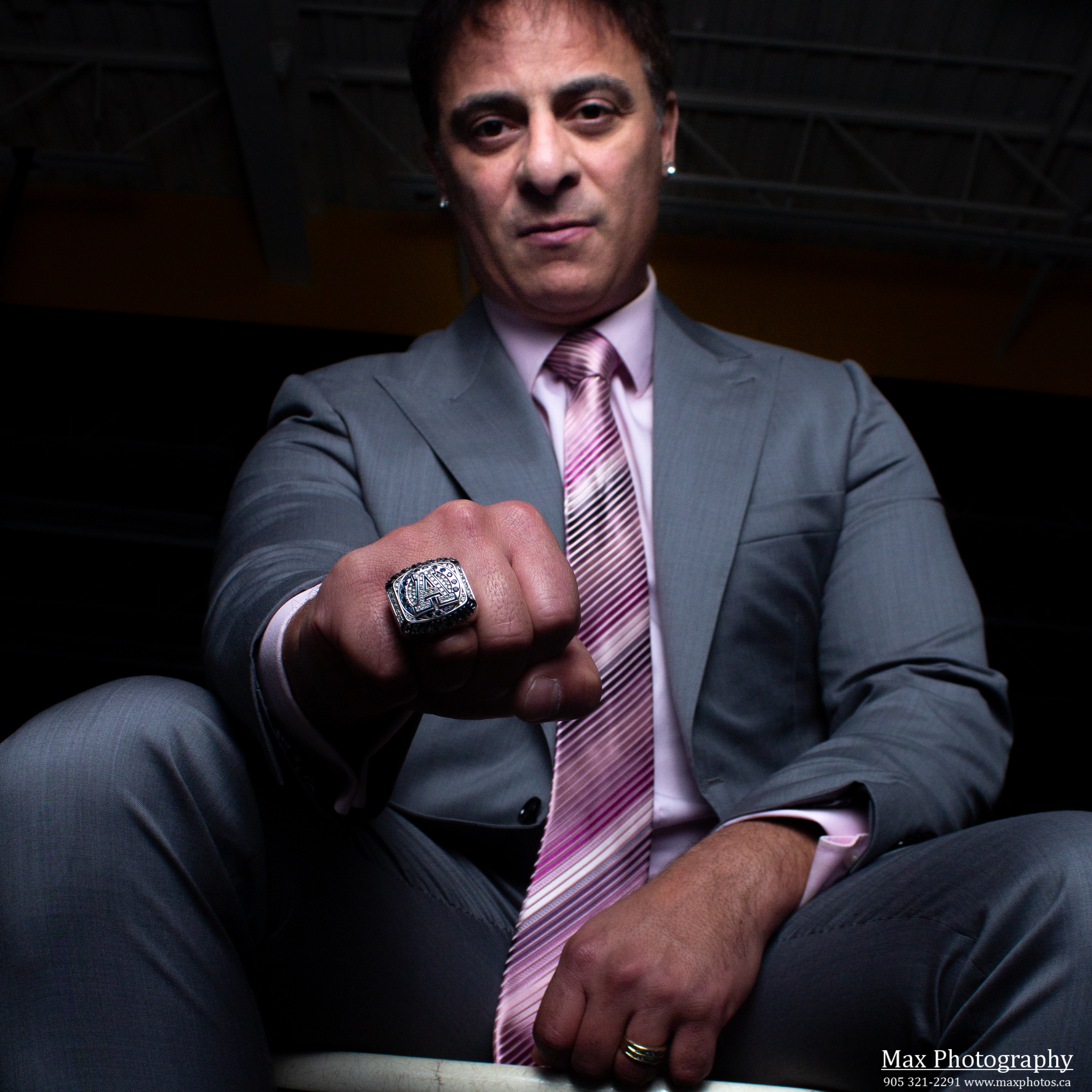
- Giancola in 2020

Profile
- Position: Placekicker

Personal information
- Born: January 28, 1970 (age 56); Thorold, Ontario, Canada
- Listed height: 5 ft 10 in (1.78 m)
- Listed weight: 210 lb (95 kg)

Career information
- High school: Dennis Morris Catholic (St. Catharines, Ontario)

Career history
- Toronto Argonauts (1999); Buffalo Bills (2000)*; B. C. Lions (2000); Toronto Argonauts (2001); Ottawa Renegades (2002); Montreal Alouettes (2003)*; Toronto Argonauts (2003)–(2004); Winnipeg Blue Bombers (2009)*
- * Offseason or practice squad member only

Awards and highlights
- 2× Grey Cup champion (2000, 2004)

Dan Giancola Jr. (born January 28, 1970) is a Canadian former professional football placekicker who played in the Canadian Football League (CFL).

== Professional career ==
At the time Giancola became a kicker in the CFL, he worked as a grocery store clerk at Commisso's Food Terminal. Giancola made his CFL debut with the Toronto Argonauts during the 1999 CFL season as a 29-year-old rookie. In his rookie season, Giancola kicked 48 field goals while also going 28 for 28 on extra point converts and recording 9 singles. The 181 points he accumulated that season were 5 points shy of the CFL record for most points scored by a first year player, set by Ray Macoritti with the Edmonton Eskimos in 1990.

In 2000, Giancola tried out with the Buffalo Bills of the National Football League but was cut during training camp. Soon after, the Argonauts, who still owned his CFL rights, traded him to the BC Lions in exchange for defensive back Marcello Simmons and defensive tackle Tom Hipsz. Giancola would go on to win a Grey Cup Championship with the Lions.

In 2001, Giancola re-signed with the Toronto Argonauts. In his second tenure with the Argonauts, Giancola made 25 field goals. The team went on to miss the playoffs.

In 2002, Giancola was drafted by the Ottawa Renegades during their expansion draft. During that season, Giancola suffered what was believed to be a groin injury and was released by the Renegades while injured. He filed a grievance against the Renegades and won.

In 2003, Giancola signed with the Montreal Alouettes, where his injury was later discovered to have been a hernia. Giancola later joined the Argonauts during the latter part of the 2003 CFL season.

In 2004, Giancola was re-acquired by the Argonauts late in the season after an injury to incumbent kicker Noel Prefontaine. Giancola's only game played during this tenure with the Argonauts occurred in the regular season finale against the Montreal Alouettes. The Argonauts would go on to win the Grey Cup that season. In what would ultimately be his last tenure with the Argonauts, he ended up playing the second most career games as their kicker during the 2000s.

On May 7, 2009, Giancola was signed by the Winnipeg Blue Bombers, five years after his last CFL stint. Giancola suffered a groin injury that kept him out for most of training camp. On June 19, 2009, he was released by the team during training camp.

== Personal life ==
As of 2011, Giancola was a personal trainer at an Anytime Fitness Gym in St. Catharines, Ontario. Since then, he has been operating his own fitness gym; BTO Performance in Thorold, Ontario.
