= Marianna W. Davis =

American educator and author (1929–2021)

Marianna White Davis (January 8, 1929 - September 11, 2021) was a professor and author in the United States. She wrote Contributions of Black Women in American History.

She was born in north Philadelphia to Rev. Albert McNeil White, who served in the army, and Laura Bowman White, a teacher. In 1931 the family moved back to Columbia, South Carolina. She graduated from Wilkinson High School in 1945, South Carolina State College in 1949, New York University in 1952, and received her doctorate from Boston University.

She was a professor of English at Benedict College in Columbia, South Carolina. She was an organizer of the Black Caucus of the National Council of Teachers of English. She organized and produced the Black History Teleconference. She was a member of the United Methodist Church.

She married Clifton E. Davis. Kenneth Renay Davis Sr. was her son.

She died September 11, 2021, aged 92 and was posthumously recognised by the South Carolina House of Representatives in December of the same year by resolution bill 4625.

== Writings ==
- A Comparative Analysis of Sentences Written by Eighth Grade Students Instructed in Transformational-generative Grammar and Traditional Grammar (1971)
- South Carolina's Blacks and Native Americans, 1776-1976, South Carolina Human Affairs Commission
- History of Black Women in America, Volume 1 (1982)
- Contributions of Black Women to America; Civil rights, politics and government, education, medicine, sciences, Volume 2 (1982)
- Contributions of Black Women to America: The arts, media, business, law, sports (1982)
- The Enduring Dream: History of Benedict College, 1870-1995
- Teaching African American Literature: Language and Practice, co-author
- History of the Black Caucus: National Council of Teachers of English, editor
- The Bowman Family of South Carolina; Our Roots, Oz and Charity Bowman (2003)
