= List of East Tennessee State Buccaneers in the NFL draft =

This is a list of East Tennessee State Buccaneers football players in the NFL draft.

== Key ==
B	Back	K	Kicker	NT	Nose tackle
C	Center	LB	Linebacker	FB	Fullback
DB	Defensive back	P	Punter	HB	Halfback
DE	Defensive end	QB	Quarterback	WR	Wide receiver
DT	Defensive tackle	RB	Running back	G	Guard
E	End	T	Offensive tackle	TE	Tight end

= Pro Bowler
= Hall of Famer

== Selections ==
Year	Round	Pick	Overall	Player	Team	Position
1945	12	1	110	John Martin	Brooklyn Tigers	B
1958	28	8	333	Jim Murphy	Baltimore Colts	T
1965	15	8	204	Phillip Morgan	Minnesota Vikings	B
1970	15	3	367	Pat Hauser	Miami Dolphins	WR
1972	15	24	388	Mike Sivert	Miami Dolphins	G
1974	8	4	186	Alan Chadwick	Chicago Bears	QB
1978	4	15	99	Dennis Law	Chicago Bears	WR
1982	5	14	125	Earl Ferrell	St. Louis Cardinals	RB
1988	7	23	188	Thane Gash	Cleveland Browns	DB
1996	3	10	71	Donnie Abraham	Tampa Bay Buccaneers	CB
