= Picasso Nelson =

American gridiron football player (born 1973)

No. 3, 29
- Positions: Linebacker, Defensive back

Personal information
- Born: May 1, 1973 (age 53); Hattiesburg, Mississippi, U.S.
- Listed height: 6 ft 0 in (1.83 m)
- Listed weight: 205 lb (93 kg)

Career information
- High school: Hattiesburg (MS)
- College: Jackson State

Career history
- 1996: Houston Oilers*
- 1997: New York Giants*
- 1998: Toronto Argonauts*
- 1998–1999: BC Lions
- 1999–2000: Edmonton Eskimos
- * Offseason or practice squad member only

Picasso Nelson (born May 1, 1973) is an American former professional football linebacker who played two seasons in the Canadian Football League (CFL) with the BC Lions and Edmonton Eskimos. He played college football at Jackson State University. He was also a member of the Houston Oilers, New York Giants and Toronto Argonauts.

== Early life ==
Picasso Nelson was born on May 1, 1973, in Hattiesburg, Mississippi. He attended Hattiesburg High School in Hattiesburg.

== College career ==
Nelson played for the Jackson State Tigers from 1992 to 1995. He was named the Southwest Athletic Conference defensive player of the year in 1995 after recording eight interceptions. He was also chosen for the Senior and Hula Bowl teams. He was inducted into the Jackson State University Sports Hall of Fame in 2009.

== Professional career ==
Nelson was signed by the Houston Oilers on April 24, 1996 and was released by the team before the start of the 1996 season.

Nelson signed with the New York Giants on March 12, 1997. He was released by the Giants on August 12, 1997.

Nelson was signed by the Toronto Argonauts in March 1998. He was released by the Argonauts on June 27, 1998.

Nelson signed with the BC Lions on August 24, 1998 and played in ten games for the Lions during the 1998 season. He played in one game during the 1999 season before being released by the Lions on August 1, 1999.

Nelson was signed by the Edmonton Eskimos on September 10, 1999. He was released by the Eskimos in February 2000.

== Coaching career ==
Nelson was later an assistant coach for the Jones County Junior College Bobcats.

== Personal life ==
Nelson's son, Picasso Nelson, Jr., is a former NFL cornerback who last played for the Arizona Cardinals; he played college football for the Southern Miss Golden Eagles. Nelson Jr.'s cousin, Kenny Shedd, also played in the NFL, as well as Nelson Jr's great-uncle, former Dallas Cowboy Eugene Bowen.
