= Bamidele Ali =

American football player (born 1976)

Profile
- Position: Defensive end

Personal information
- Born: November 1, 1976 (age 50); Cheverly, Maryland, U.S.
- Listed height: 6 ft 3 in (1.91 m)
- Listed weight: 218 lb (99 kg)

Career information
- High school: Marianna
- College: Kentucky

Career history
- 1999–2000: Saskatchewan Roughriders

Bamidele Ali (born November 1, 1976) is a former gridiron football defensive end who played for the Saskatchewan Roughriders of the Canadian Football League. From 1999 to 2000, he played 24 regular season games for the Roughriders and recorded 73 tackles, seven sacks, and three interceptions. He played college football for the Kentucky Wildcats. He studied electrical engineering and mathematics at Kentucky. After playing for the Roughriders, Ali worked for several companies as an engineer specializing in 3D printing.

== Early career ==
Despite receiving multiple offers to play at less well-known schools, Ali attended the University of Kentucky to have the chance to walk-on to a Division I-A team. Originally a strong safety, Ali was later given a sports scholarship and converted to the outside linebacker position. In 1997, he started as a defensive end for the first time and recorded a team-high seven sacks. Ali was named to the "Unsung Hero All-America Team" by the College Football Chronicle.

== Professional career ==
Before the 1999 season, Ali was signed by the Saskatchewan Roughriders as a free agent. He remained on the active roster at the start of the regular season. Ali was removed from the active lineup in mid-September due to an ankle injury, but he returned later that month after Trevis Smith dislocated his hip. With 46 tackles, five sacks, and an interception over 13 games, Ali had his most successful season as a rookie.

Ali returned to the Roughriders in 2000. In July, he intercepted Hamilton Tiger-Cats quarterback Danny McManus twice for his only interceptions of the season. The Roughriders went on to win the game 40–34. By August, Ali was "considered the team's best defensive player", but he was forced to miss games after breaking his left arm. After returning to the lineup, Ali tore a tendon in his knee, ending his season.

== Later life ==
Starting in 1998, Ali worked for General Electric (GE) as an electrical engineer while not with the Roughriders. After his injuries in 2000, he moved to Milwaukee and continued to work for GE full-time. He later worked for DSM creating a strategy to develop 3D printing products and founded Ali Technologies, a manufacturing consulting firm specializing in 3D printing. As of May 2016, Ali is a Vice President of Business Development at Architected Materials.
