= Max Runager =

American football player (1956–2017)

No. 4
- Position: Punter

Personal information
- Born: March 24, 1956; Greenwood, South Carolina, U.S.
- Died: June 30, 2017 (aged 61); Orangeburg, South Carolina, U.S.
- Listed height: 6 ft 1 in (1.85 m)
- Listed weight: 189 lb (86 kg)

Career information
- High school: Orangeburg-Wilkinson (Orangeburg)
- College: South Carolina
- NFL draft: 1979: 8th round, 211th overall pick

Career history
- Philadelphia Eagles (1979–1983); San Francisco 49ers (1984–1988); Cleveland Browns (1988); Philadelphia Eagles (1989)

Awards and highlights
- 2× Super Bowl champion (XIX, XXIII)

Career NFL statistics
- Punts: 661
- Punt yards: 26,581
- Longest punt: 64
- Stats at Pro Football Reference

Max Culp Runager (March 24, 1956 – June 30, 2017) was an American professional football punter in the National Football League (NFL) for eleven seasons for the Philadelphia Eagles, San Francisco 49ers, and Cleveland Browns. A graduate of Orangeburg-Wilkinson High School, he was selected by the Eagles in the eighth round (211th overall) of the 1979 NFL draft. Runager played college football at the University of South Carolina. He punted for two Super Bowl teams, the Eagles in 1980 and the 49ers in 1984.

Runager is one of at least 345 NFL players to be diagnosed after death with chronic traumatic encephalopathy (CTE), which is caused by repeated hits to the head.

== NFL career statistics ==
Legend
| | Won the Super Bowl |
| **Bold** | Career high |

=== Regular season ===
| Year | Team | Punting | | | | | | | | | |
| Year | Team | GP | Punts | Yds | Net Yds | Lng | Avg | Net Avg | Blk | Ins20 | TB |
|---|---|---|---|---|---|---|---|---|---|---|---|
| 1979 | PHI | 16 | 74 | 2,927 | 2,607 | 57 | 39.6 | 34.8 | 1 | 13 | 6 |
| 1980 | PHI | 16 | 75 | 2,947 | 2,563 | 58 | 39.3 | 33.7 | 1 | 16 | 8 |
| 1981 | PHI | 15 | 63 | 2,567 | 2,201 | **64** | 40.7 | **34.9** | 0 | 18 | 6 |
| 1982 | PHI | 9 | 44 | 1,784 | 1,448 | 53 | 40.5 | 32.9 | 0 | 8 | 1 |
| 1983 | PHI | 12 | 59 | 2,459 | 2,020 | 55 | 41.7 | 34.2 | 0 | 12 | 5 |
| 1984 | SFO | 14 | 56 | 2,341 | 1,925 | 59 | **41.8** | 33.8 | 1 | 18 | **12** |
| 1985 | SFO | 16 | **86** | 3,422 | **2,948** | 57 | 39.8 | 33.9 | 1 | **30** | 9 |
| 1986 | SFO | 16 | 83 | **3,450** | 2,917 | 62 | 41.6 | 34.3 | **2** | 23 | 8 |
| 1987 | SFO | 12 | 55 | 2,157 | 1,850 | 56 | 39.2 | 33.0 | 1 | 14 | 7 |
| 1988 | SFO | 1 | 1 | 24 | 24 | 24 | 24.0 | 24.0 | 0 | 0 | 0 |
| 1988 | CLE | 13 | 48 | 1,935 | 1,694 | 52 | 40.3 | 33.9 | **2** | 13 | 2 |
| 1989 | PHI | 4 | 17 | 568 | 518 | 52 | 33.4 | 30.5 | 0 | 5 | 1 |
| Career | | 144 | 661 | 26,581 | 22,715 | 64 | 40.2 | 33.9 | 9 | 170 | 65 |

=== Playoffs ===
| Year | Team | Punting | | | | | | | | | |
| Year | Team | GP | Punts | Yds | Net Yds | Lng | Avg | Net Avg | Blk | Ins20 | TB |
|---|---|---|---|---|---|---|---|---|---|---|---|
| 1979 | PHI | 2 | 9 | 383 | 330 | **52** | **42.6** | **36.7** | 0 | 2 | **1** |
| 1980 | PHI | 3 | **11** | 382 | 339 | 46 | 34.7 | 30.8 | 0 | 2 | **1** |
| 1981 | PHI | 1 | 7 | 297 | 256 | 47 | 42.4 | 36.6 | 0 | 0 | 0 |
| 1984 | SFO | 3 | **11** | **425** | **376** | 48 | 38.6 | 34.2 | 0 | **3** | 0 |
| 1985 | SFO | 1 | 6 | 228 | 179 | 46 | 38.0 | 29.8 | 0 | 1 | **1** |
| 1986 | SFO | 1 | 10 | 400 | 343 | 49 | 40.0 | 34.3 | 0 | **3** | 0 |
| 1987 | SFO | 1 | 6 | 245 | 216 | 49 | 40.8 | 36.0 | 0 | 1 | 0 |
| 1988 | CLE | 1 | 3 | 106 | 106 | 43 | 35.3 | 35.3 | 0 | **3** | 0 |
| Career | | 13 | 63 | 2,466 | 2,145 | 52 | 39.1 | 34.0 | 0 | 15 | 3 |
