= Tim Terry =

American football player and executive (born 1974)

Kansas City Chiefs
- Title: Vice president of player personnel

Personal information
- Born: July 26, 1974 (age 52); Hempstead, New York, U.S.
- Listed height: 6 ft 2 in (1.88 m)
- Listed weight: 240 lb (109 kg)

Career information
- Position: Linebacker (No. 52, 59)
- High school: Hempstead
- College: Temple
- NFL draft: 1997: undrafted

Career history

Playing
- Cincinnati Bengals (1997–1998); Kansas City Chiefs (1999)*; Hamilton Tiger-Cats (1999); Kansas City Chiefs (2000)*; Seattle Seahawks (2000–2002)
- * Offseason or practice squad member only

Operations
- Green Bay Packers (2004–2007) Pro personnel assistant; Green Bay Packers (2008–2016) Assistant director of player personnel; Kansas City Chiefs (2017–2024) Director of pro personnel; Kansas City Chiefs (2025–present) Vice president of player personnel

Awards and highlights
- 4× Super Bowl champion (XLV, LIV, LVII, LVIII); 87th Grey Cup champion

Career NFL statistics
- Tackles: 83
- Sacks: 3.5
- Forced fumbles: 2
- Stats at Pro Football Reference

Timothy L. Terry (born July 26, 1974) is an American football executive and former linebacker who is the vice president of player personnel for the Kansas City Chiefs of the National Football League (NFL). He has previously spent 13 years in the Green Bay Packers scouting department ending his tenure as an assistant director of player personnel. He played college football for the Temple Owls and signed as an undrafted free agent with the Cincinnati Bengals in 1997. He also played for the Kansas City Chiefs and Seattle Seahawks. Terry also played one year in the Canadian Football League as a member of the 1999 Grey Cup champion Hamilton Tiger-Cats.

== Playing career ==
=== College ===
Terry played as a linebacker at Temple.

=== National Football League ===
==== Cincinnati Bengals ====
In 1997, Terry was signed by the Cincinnati Bengals after going undrafted in the 1997 NFL draft. He was mainly on the practice squad.

==== Kansas City Chiefs ====
In 1999, Terry was signed by the Kansas City Chiefs. Like in Cincinnati, he was mainly on the practice squad before being released.

==== Seattle Seahawks ====
In 2000, Terry was signed by the Seattle Seahawks. Terry retired from professional football following the 2002 season.

=== Canadian Football League ===
==== Hamilton Tiger-Cats ====
Following his release from the Chiefs, Terry signed with the Hamilton Tiger-Cats of the Canadian Football League (CFL) in 1999. He was a member of the team when they won the 87th Grey Cup in 1999.

== Executive career ==
=== Green Bay Packers ===
In 2004, Terry was hired by the Green Bay Packers as a pro personnel assistant. In 2008, he was promoted to assistant director of pro personnel. In 2010, Terry won his first Super Bowl when the Packers defeated the Pittsburgh Steelers 31–25 in Super Bowl XLV.

=== Kansas City Chiefs ===
On May 17, 2017, Terry was hired by the Kansas City Chiefs as their director of pro personnel. In 2019, Terry won his second Super Bowl when the Chiefs defeated the San Francisco 49ers 31–20 in Super Bowl LIV. In 2022, Terry won his third Super Bowl when the Chiefs defeated the Philadelphia Eagles 38–35 in Super Bowl LVII. In 2023, Terry won his fourth Super Bowl when the Chiefs defeated the 49ers 25–22 in Super Bowl LVIII.

On May 24, 2025, Terry was promoted to the role of vice president of player personnel.
