= Will Overstreet =

American football player (born 1979)

No. 90
- Position: Linebacker

Personal information
- Born: October 7, 1979 (age 47); Jackson, Mississippi, U.S.
- Listed height: 6 ft 2 in (1.88 m)
- Listed weight: 259 lb (117 kg)

Career information
- High school: Jackson Preparatory
- College: Tennessee
- NFL draft: 2002: 3rd round, 80th overall pick

Career history
- Atlanta Falcons (2002–2003)

Awards and highlights
- BCS national champion (1998); Third-team All-American (2001); 2× First-team All-SEC (2000, 2001)

Career NFL statistics
- Tackles: 9
- Stats at Pro Football Reference

William Sparkman Overstreet (born October 7, 1979) is an American former professional football player who was a linebacker for the Atlanta Falcons of the National Football League (NFL). He was selected by the Falcons in the third round of the 2002 NFL draft with the 80th overall pick out of the University of Tennessee where he was a captain on the 2001 Tennessee team. He was a member of Pi Kappa Alpha fraternity. He played high school football at Jackson (Miss.) Prep. Prior to signing with the Vols in February 1998, The Clarion-Ledgernewspaper named Overstreet the 1997 Metro-Jackson Area Player of the Year and selected him as a member of their All-State team.

Overstreet retired from the NFL after continued shoulder injuries. He graduated with his M.B.A. in Finance in December 2006. He was the founder and CEO of a software company headquartered in Knoxville, TN, called Voices Heard Media, Inc.
