= Paul Lacoste (Canadian football) =

American gridiron football player (born 1974)

No. 58, 52
- Position: Linebacker

Personal information
- Born: September 3, 1974 (age 52); Jackson, Mississippi, U.S.

Career information
- High school: Jackson
- College: Mississippi State

Career history
- 1998–2000: B.C Lions
- 2001: Memphis Maniax
- 2003: Amsterdam Admirals

Awards and highlights
- CFL All-Star (1999); CFL West All-Star (1999); Jackie Parker Trophy (1999); 1999 CFL Rookie of the Year; Second-team All-American (1996); First-team All-SEC (1996); 2× Academic All-SEC (1994 & 1996); SEC Good Works Team (1996)

Paul Victor Lacoste (born September 3, 1974) is a former linebacker in the Southeastern Conference at Mississippi State University and in the Canadian Football League.

Paul featured on the Mississippi episode of Irish network TG4's television travel series "Hector - Ó Chósta go Cósta" speaking positively in support of the benefits of exercise and fitness for Mississippians at the Paul Lacoste gym.

== Early life ==
Lacoste played his high school football at Jackson Prep and went on to enjoy an outstanding college career at Mississippi State University, where he was an All-SEC and All-America selection in 1996.

== Professional career ==
He signed with the B.C. Lions of the CFL in 1998, making his professional debut with the team in 1999. He finished the 1999 season second on the team with 78 tackles, earning him the 1999 CFL Rookie of the Year Award. He had a late start to the 2000 season, after a National Football League tryout, and was later cut by British Columbia.

In 2000, he was signed by the NFL's Indianapolis Colts on January 25, but was released on August 21 of the same year. In 2001, Lacoste joined the XFL's Memphis Maniax, where he made four tackles. In 2002, he signed with the Dallas Desperados of the Arena Football League on May 23, but was cut the very next day. In 2003, the Colts allocated Lacoste to NFL Europe; he was to play for the Amsterdam Admirals but he was cut at the end of training camp.

== After football ==
Currently, he is the owner and head trainer of Next Level Sports, a speed training specialist firm based in his hometown of Jackson, Mississippi. Lacoste has a Master of Science in Sports Administration from Mississippi State University.

He would later be implicated for having a role in the Mississippi welfare funds scandal. He was acknowledged to have received a $1.4 million contract for a fitness boot camp program through state welfare funds and personally received $1.3 million of this welfare money.
