= Donnie Abraham =

American football player and coach (born 1973)

Orlando Storm
- Title: Defensive coordinator

Personal information
- Born: October 8, 1973 (age 53); Orangeburg, South Carolina, U.S.
- Listed height: 5 ft 10 in (1.78 m)
- Listed weight: 192 lb (87 kg)

Career information
- Position: Cornerback (No. 21, 29)
- High school: Wilkinson (Orangeburg)
- College: East Tennessee State (1992–1995)
- NFL draft: 1996: 3rd round, 71st overall pick

Career history

Playing
- Tampa Bay Buccaneers (1996–2001); New York Jets (2002–2004)

Coaching
- East Lake (2005–2008) Defensive backs coach; Gibbs (FL) (2009–2010) Head coach; Tampa Bay Storm (2011–2012) Defensive backs coach; East Lake (2012) Defensive backs coach; Clearwater (2013–2014) Head coach; IMG (2015–2016) Defensive coordinator; Illinois (2017) Defensive backs coach; Orlando Apollos (2019) Defensive backs coach; St. Louis Battlehawks (2023–2025) Defensive coordinator; Orlando Storm (2026–present) Defensive coordinator

Awards and highlights
- Pro Bowl (2000); NFL interceptions co-leader (1999); PFWA All-Rookie Team (1996)

Career NFL statistics
- Tackles: 442
- Sacks: 2
- Forced fumbles: 2
- Fumble recoveries: 8
- Interceptions: 38
- Touchdowns: 5
- Stats at Pro Football Reference

Nathaniel Donnell Abraham (born October 8, 1973) is an American football coach and former cornerback who is the defensive coordinator for the Orlando Storm of the United Football League (UFL). He was selected in the third round of the 1996 NFL draft. In his career, he played for the Tampa Bay Buccaneers (1996–2001) and the New York Jets (2002–2004).

== Professional career ==
=== Pre-draft ===
Pre-draft measurables
Height	Weight	Arm length	Hand span	40-yard dash	10-yard split	20-yard split	20-yard shuttle	Vertical jump	Broad jump	Bench press
5 ft 9 6/10 in (1.77 m)	190 lb (86 kg)	32 in (0.81 m)	8 3/4 in (0.22 m)	4.61 s	1.58 s	2.65 s	4.05 s	32 in (0.81 m)	9 ft 9 in (2.97 m)	13 reps
All values from NFL Combine

=== Tampa Bay Buccaneers ===
==== 1996 ====
The Tampa Bay Buccaneers selected Abraham in the third round (71st overall) of the 1996 NFL draft. He was the ninth cornerback selected and the first of two cornerbacks selected by the Buccaneers in 1996, along with sixth round pick (221st overall) Reggie Rusk.

He became only the seventh player from East Tennessee State to be selected in the NFL draft since 1967. Abraham was the first player drafted from East Tennessee State since Thane Gash in 1988 and also surpassed 1975 fourth round pick (99th overall) Dennis Law to become the highest draft pick in school history. No player drafted to the NFL from East Tennessee State since Abraham as of 2025.

On July 15, 1996, the Buccaneers signed Abraham to a three–year, $920,000 rookie contract that included an initial signing bonus of $300,000.

He entered training camp slated as the starting nickelback under new defensive coordinator Monte Kiffin. Head coach Tony Dungy named Abraham a backup and listed him as the starting nickelback to begin the season, behind returning starting duo Martin Mayhew and Charles Dimry.

On September 1, 1996, Abraham made his professional regular season debut in the Tampa Bay Buccaneers' home-opener against the Green Bay Packers and made two solo tackles, one pass deflection, and a fumble recovery in a 34–3 loss. The following week, Abraham earned his first career start as a nickelback and set a season-high with nine combined tackles (seven solo) during a 6–21 loss at the Detroit Lions in Week 2. On September 15, 1996, Abraham made three combined tackles (two solo), a pass deflection, and had his first career interception on a pass John Elway threw to wide receiver Mike Sherrard during a 23–27 loss at the Denver Broncos. Entering Week 8, head coach Tony Dungy named Abraham the No. 2 starting cornerback, supplanting Charles Dimry, who was demoted to the primary backup for the rest of the season. In Week 8, he earned his first start at outside corner and produced three solo tackles as the Buccaneers lost 9–13 at the Arizona Cardinals.

"After you’ve been around him a couple of days, you realize he’s something special,” Bucs veteran strong safety. I can’t speak enough about him the way he’s come in, in one of the toughest positions to play as a rookie."

— John Lynch
(Bucs' starting strong safety)

On November 17, 1996, Abraham recorded four solo tackles, set a season-high with three pass deflections, and led a fourth quarter comeback as the Buccaneers were losing 13–17 at the San Diego Chargers with 8:31 remaining in the fourth quarter by intercepting a pass Stan Humphries threw to wide receiver Shannon Mitchell and returned it for 21–yards to the Chargers' 13–yard line. His interception quickly led to a 27–yard chip shot field goal by Michael Husted and ignited the Bucs to score 12 unanswered points to defeat the Chargers 25–17. This became Abraham's breakout performance, garnering him nationwide recognition, and cemented himself as the No. 2 starting cornerback. The following week, he made three solo tackles, one pass deflection, and intercepted a pass Jim Everett threw to wide receiver Michael Haynes as the Buccaneers defeated the New Orleans Saints 13–7 in Week 13. He finished his rookie season with 63 combined tackles (53 solo), 12 pass deflections, five interceptions, and two fumble recoveries in 16 games and 12 starts.

==== 1997 ====
The Tampa Bay Buccaneers revamped their group of cornerbacks following the season due to the departures of Martin Mayhew and Charles Dimry via free agency. They signed experienced starting veteran cornerback Anthony Parker as a free agent and selected Ronde Barber in the third round (66th overall) and Al Harris in the sixth round (169th overall) of the 1997 NFL draft. Abraham entered training camp slated as the de facto No. 1 starting cornerback entering his second season. Head coach Tony Dungy named Abraham and Anthony Parker as the starting cornerbacks to begin the season.

On September 28, 1997, Abraham recorded four solo tackles, set a season-high with three pass deflections, and intercepted a pass attempt by Kent Graham as the Buccaneers defeated the Arizona Cardinals 18–19. In Week 10, he set a season-high with six solo tackles, made three pass deflections, and sealed a 31–28 victory at the Indianapolis Colts by intercepting a pass Kelly Holcomb threw to wide receiver Aaron Bailey with less than two minutes remaining. He started all 16 games throughout the season for the first time in his career and recorded 56 combined tackles (46 solo), 18 pass deflections, five interceptions, and one fumble recovery.

The Tampa Bay Buccaneers finished the 1997 NFL season in second place in the NFC Central with a 10–6 record to earn a Wild-Card berth. On December 28, 1997, Abraham started in his first career playoff game and recorded five combined tackles (four solo) and made two pass deflections as the Buccaneers defeated the Detroit Lions 10–20 in the NFC Wild-Card Game. On January 4, 1998, Abraham made one solo tackle, two pass deflections, and intercepted two pass attempts by Brett Favre during a 7–21 loss at the defending Super Bowl XXXI Champions the Green Bay Packers.

==== 1998 ====
On July 7, 1998, the Tampa Bay Buccaneers signed Abraham to a five–year, $17.50 million contract that included $10 million guaranteed and an initial signing bonus of $2.5 million. The deal restructured the last year Abraham still had remaining from his rookie contract in 1996 and added a four–year extension that kept him under contract throughout the 2002 NFL season.

He returned to training camp slated as the No. 1 starting cornerback under assistant head coach Herm Edwards and defensive coordinator Monte Kiffin. The Buccaneers selected cornerback Brian Kelly in the third round of the 1998 NFL draft to compete with Anthony Parker for the role as the No. 2 starting cornerback. Floyd Young competed against Ronde Barber and Al Harris to retain his position as the fourth cornerback on the depth chart. Head coach Tony Dungy named Abraham and Anthony Parker as the starting cornerbacks to begin the season, alongside Floyd Young as the starting nickelback.

On October 9, 1998, the NFL issued a $5,000 fine to Abraham for an incident during a 20–5 win against the New York Giants in Week 5, where Abraham threw an illegal blow with his forearm to the head of wide receiver Ike Hilliard, which led to a 15–yard penalty for unnecessary roughness. In Week 7, Abraham recorded three solo tackles before he exited during the fourth quarter of a 16–13 victory against the Carolina Panthers due to a knee sprain. He was diagnosed with a knee sprain after undergoing an MRI and remained inactive for the next three games (Weeks 8–10). In Week 8, No. 2 starting cornerback Anthony Parker injured his hamstring and subsequently remained inactive for five games (Weeks 9–13). During their absence, rookie Brian Kelly and Ronde Barber filled in as the starting cornerbacks until Abraham and Parker returned from their injuries. Throughout the season, Ronde Barber had quickly climbed the depth chart after overtaking Floyd Young prior to Week 2. Entering Week 12, defensive coordinator Monte Kiffin made two the decision to promote Ronde Barber to the No. 2 starting cornerback after he impressively performed well enough to supplant Brian Kelly. Abraham and Barber started the final six games of the season beside one another even upon Anthony Parker's return from injury. In Week 14, he set a season-high with six combined tackles (four solo), one pass break-up, and a fumble recovery as the Buccaneers defeated the Green Bay Packers 24–22. On December 13, 1998, Abraham made two solo tackles, two pass deflections, and sealed a 16–3 victory against the Pittsburgh Steelers by intercepting a pass Kordell Stewart threw to wide receiver Charles Johnson with 1:15 remaining in the fourth quarter. He finished the 1998 NFL season with 39 combined tackles (33 solo), two fumble recoveries, and had one interception in 13 games and 13 starts.

==== 1999 ====
Training camp began with Abraham and Ronde Barber projected as the starting cornerbacks to begin the season following the departure of Anthony Parker. Head coach Tony Dungy rectified the secondary entering the season, naming Abraham and Ronde Barber as the starting cornerbacks, alongside Brian Kelly as the nickelback. Damien Robinson earned the starting free safety role following the departure of Charles Mincy and was paired with leading strong safety John Lynch.

In Week 10, he set a season-high with nine combined tackles (eight solo), made two pass deflections, and made the first sack of his career on Elvis Grbac for a nine–yard loss as the Buccaneers defeated the Kansas City Chiefs 10–17. On November 21, 1999, Abraham made two solo tackles, two pass deflections, set a season-high with two interceptions, and secured a 10–19 victory against the Atlanta Falcons by intercepting Chris Chandler's pass that he caught after it bounced off running back Winslow Oliver and returned it for 47–yards to score the first touchdown of his career with only 41 seconds remaining. The Buccaneers scored 19 unanswered points as the defense held the Falcons scoreless for three quarters to comeback from a 10-point deficit. The following week, he recorded six combined tackles (five solo), made two pass deflections, and picked off a pass attempt thrown by Jon Kitna during a 16–3 victory at the Seattle Seahawks. On December 6, 1999, Abraham recorded four solo tackles, set a career-high with five pass deflections, made two interceptions, and returned one for a touchdown as the Buccaneers defeated the Minnesota Vikings. During the Vikings' opening drive in the first quarter, Abraham intercepted a pass Jeff George threw to wide receiver Cris Carter and returned it for a 55–yard touchdown. In Week 17, Abraham produced two solo tackles, one pass deflection, and set a career-high with his seventh interception of the season on a pass Cade McNown threw to wide receiver Bobby Engram during a 20–6 victory at the Chicago Bears. He started in all 16 games throughout the season and set career-high marks with 72 combined tackles (65 solo), 25 pass deflections, seven interceptions, two sacks, and two touchdowns. His best statistical season earned him a selection to the 2000 Pro Bowl, marking the first and only Pro Bowl selection of his career. His seven interceptions tied four others for the most interceptions in 2000, including James Hasty, Troy Vincent, Rod Woodson, and Sam Madison.

==== 2000–2002 ====
On March 14, 2002, the Buccaneers officially released Abraham after six seasons in a salary cap decision.

=== New York Jets ===
On April 23, 2002, the New York Jets signed Abraham to a six–year, $17.50 million contract that included $5 million guaranteed.

On July 18, 2005, Abraham officially announced his retirement after announcing the possibility of retirement following the 2004 NFL season. He cited his desire to spend more time with his family as the main reason for his decision.

== NFL career statistics ==
Legend
	Led the league
**Bold**	Career high

=== Regular season ===
Year	Team	Games		Tackles				Interceptions				Fumbles			
Year	Team	GP	GS	Comb	Solo	Ast	Sck	Int	Yds	TD	Lng	FF	FR	Yds	TD
1996	TAM	16	12	58	50	8	0.0	5	27	0	21	0	**2**	3	0
1997	TAM	16	16	54	44	10	0.0	5	16	0	16	0	1	2	0
1998	TAM	13	13	38	32	6	0.0	1	3	0	3	0	**2**	0	0
1999	TAM	16	16	**79**	**65**	14	**2.0**	**7**	**115**	**2**	55	**1**	0	0	0
2000	TAM	16	16	57	46	11	0.0	**7**	82	0	23	**1**	0	0	0
2001	TAM	15	5	39	29	10	0.0	6	98	0	46	0	1	0	0
2002	NYJ	16	16	53	47	6	0.0	4	49	0	23	0	0	0	0
2003	NYJ	8	2	11	11	0	0.0	1	12	0	12	0	0	0	0
2004	NYJ	16	16	53	38	**15**	0.0	2	66	1	**66**	0	**2**	**39**	**1**
		132	112	442	362	80	2.0	38	468	3	66	2	8	44	1

=== Playoffs ===
Year	Team	Games		Tackles				Interceptions				Fumbles			
Year	Team	GP	GS	Comb	Solo	Ast	Sck	Int	Yds	TD	Lng	FF	FR	Yds	TD
1997	TAM	2	2	5	5	0	0.0	**2**	0	0	0	0	0	0	0
1999	TAM	2	2	**8**	**7**	**1**	0.0	0	0	0	0	0	0	0	0
2000	TAM	1	1	3	2	**1**	0.0	1	0	0	0	0	0	0	0
2001	TAM	1	1	4	4	0	0.0	0	0	0	0	0	0	0	0
2002	NYJ	2	2	2	2	0	0.0	0	0	0	0	0	0	0	0
2004	NYJ	2	2	6	6	0	0.0	0	0	0	0	0	**1**	0	0
		10	10	28	26	2	0.0	3	0	0	0	0	1	0	0

== Life after football ==
After considering retirement since the 2004 season ended, he finally decided to do so on July 15, 2005. Although he had two restaurant businesses going in South Carolina, Abrahams was searching for a post-playing occupation, and during his playing years he swore to himself that he would never become a coach. However, while on the sidelines of his oldest son's youth football practice, a local high school coach, whose son played on the same team as Abraham's, approached him about helping out his team. Before long, Abraham became the head coach at Gibbs High School in St. Petersburg.

Abraham guided Gibbs to its first district title in 2009 but resigned after a 3–7 season in 2010. He was defensive backs coordinator (2011–2012) at Tampa Bay Storm and later (2012) at East Lake High School. In 2013, he was the head coach of the Clearwater High School football team and resigned in 2015. He was (2015–2017) the defensive coordinator at IMG Academy, in Bradenton, Florida. On February 15, 2017, he was named defensive assistant coach for the Illinois Fighting Illini football, joining Head Coach Lovie Smith's coaching team. Abraham left the Illinois program in the summer of 2018.

In November 2018, Abraham joined Steve Spurrier's Orlando Apollos coaching staff as defensive backs coach.

In June 2022, Abraham joined Anthony Becht's coaching staff as the Defensive Coordinator of St. Louis.

== Personal life ==
Abraham's son, Micah, played college football at Marshall and was selected in the sixth round of the 2024 NFL draft by the Indianapolis Colts.
