= Ryan Terry =

American football player (born 1971)

No. 31, 33, 9, 24
- Positions: Running back, return specialist

Personal information
- Born: September 20, 1971 (age 55); Fort Bragg, North Carolina, U.S.
- Listed height: 5 ft 11 in (1.80 m)
- Listed weight: 203 lb (92 kg)

Career information
- High school: Steubenville (Steubenville, Ohio)
- College: Tennessee State (1990); Iowa (1991–1994)
- NFL draft: 1995: undrafted

Career history
- Arizona Cardinals (1995–1996); Toronto Argonauts (1999–2000); Edmonton Eskimos (2001); Montreal Alouettes (2002)

Career NFL statistics
- Games played: 20
- Return yards: 892
- Receptions: 1
- Fumble recoveries: 2
- Stats at Pro Football Reference

Ryan Lamont Terry (born September 20, 1971) is an American former professional football running back and return specialist who played in the National Football League (NFL) with the Arizona Cardinals and in the Canadian Football League (CFL) with the Toronto Argonauts, Edmonton Eskimos and Montreal Alouettes. He played college football for the Tennessee State Tigers and Iowa Hawkeyes.

== Early life ==
Terry was born on September 20, 1971, in Fort Bragg, North Carolina, when his father, Raymond, was in the military. The family moved to Omaha, Nebraska and then to Steubenville, Ohio, where he attended and played football at Steubenville High School. As a senior, Terry was an all-district selection, where he rushed for 936 yards and 10 touchdowns but was plagued by an ankle injury. Terry committed to play college football for the Tennessee State Tigers over offers from Kent State, Miami (OH) and Army.

== College career ==
Terry played college football for the Tennessee State Tigers in 1990 and the Iowa Hawkeyes from 1991 to 1994. He was a three-year letterman from 1992 to 1994. Terry rushed for 329 yards at Tennessee State before he transferred to University of Iowa. He picked Iowa over Indiana, Penn State, Purdue and Wisconsin. Terry chose to finish the school year at TSU and walked-on at Iowa in 1991.

Terry played in 32 games as a Hawkeye, where he rushed for 1,444 yards and 12 touchdowns. He also caught 39 passes for 256 yards and two touchdowns. Terry also attempted three passes on trick plays, completing two for five yards and a touchdown.

== Professional career ==
=== Arizona Cardinals ===
After going undrafted in the 1995 NFL draft, Terry signed with the Arizona Cardinals of the National Football League (NFL) as an undrafted free agent. He made the roster and served as the teams' primary kick returner, accumulating 838 yards on 37 returns. On February 16, 1996, Terry was released by the team. On April 25, he was re-signed by the Cardinals to a $164,000 contract. Terry had one reception for no yards in the 1996 season opener. He played in five games and returned four kicks for 84 yards. In his final game against the St. Louis Rams, Terry made a tackle on special teams. On September 30, 1996, he was released by the team to make room for fullback Ryan Christopherson.

=== Toronto Argonauts ===
On March 24, 1999, the Toronto Argonauts of the Canadian Football League (CFL) signed Terry. On July 3, he was released and signed to the practice roster the next day. Terry made his first start in week four against the Saskatchewan Roughriders and rushed for 49 yards. He finished with 762 rushing yards, three touchdowns and 15 receptions for 131 yards in 13 games. Terry also had 406 return yards on kickoffs. In 2000, he played in ten games, where he rushed for 315 yards, three rushing touchdowns and had 23 catches for 226 yards and one touchdown. On February 15, 2001, he became a free agent.

=== Edmonton Eskimos ===
On March 9, 2001, Terry signed with the Edmonton Eskimos. He played in three games for the Esks and caught two passes for 53 yards and 142 kickoff return yards. Injuries hampered his season and he eventually found his way down on the depth chart. On September 11, 2001, Terry was released by the team.

=== Montreal Alouettes ===
On February 22, 2002, the Montreal Alouettes signed Terry. In six games, he had 127 rushing yards and one touchdown and eight catches for 76 yards. Terry also had 343 kick return yards. He was released three times during the season and walked out on the team after he demanded a roster bonus. Management refused to do so but a technical error by the Alouettes meant that Terry's salary would be guaranteed based on his CFL experience. On October 25, he was cut by the team.

== Personal life ==
His father, Raymond, was a Green Beret and saw action in the Vietnam War. In addition, he played for two years as a running back at Indiana. After his playing career, he owned a business in Katy, Texas, to work with athletes and anyone focused on flexibility issues.
