= William Hampton (gridiron football) =

American football player (born 1975)

No. 41, 31
- Position: Defensive back

Personal information
- Born: March 7, 1975 (age 51); Little Rock, Arkansas, U.S.
- Listed height: 5 ft 10 in (1.78 m)
- Listed weight: 190 lb (86 kg)

Career information
- High school: McClellan (Little Rock)
- College: Murray State

Career history
- Calgary Stampeders (1997–1999); Denver Broncos (2000)*; Philadelphia Eagles (2000-2001); Carolina Panthers (2003–2004)
- * Offseason or practice squad member only

Career statistics
- Total tackles: 17
- Fumble recoveries: 1
- Interceptions: 1
- Defensive touchdowns: 1
- Stats at Pro Football Reference

Career CFL statistics
- Interceptions: 16
- Total touchdowns: 5

William Louis Hampton Jr. (born March 7, 1975) is an American former professional football player who was a defensive back in the National Football League (NFL) and Canadian Football League (CFL). He played for the Philadelphia Eagles and Carolina Panthers of the NFL and the Calgary Stampeders of the CFL. Hampton played college football for the Murray State Racers.
