= Chris Burns (Canadian football) =

American gridiron football player (born 1972)

Profile
- Positions: Guard, Offensive tackle

Personal information
- Born: December 2, 1972 (age 53); Greenwich, Connecticut, U.S.

Career information
- College: Portland State

Career history
- 1994–1995: Saskatchewan Roughriders
- 1995–1996: Ottawa Rough Riders
- 1997: Calgary Stampeders
- 1998–2001: Hamilton Tiger-Cats
- 2002–2004: Ottawa Renegades

Awards and highlights
- Grey Cup champion (1999); 2× CFL East All-Star (1999, 2000)

Chris Burns (born December 12, 1972) is an American former professional football offensive lineman who played eleven seasons in the Canadian Football League (CFL) for five different teams. He was named CFL East All-Star in 1999 and 2000, and was a part of one Grey Cup championship team with the Hamilton Tiger-Cats in 1999. Burns was an All-American Offensive Tackle college football at Portland State University.
