= Jason Richards (Canadian football) =

American gridiron football player (born 1975)

No. 93, 43
- Positions: Defensive tackle, long snapper

Personal information
- Born: November 17, 1975 (age 50); Ellwood City, Pennsylvania, U.S.
- Listed height: 6 ft 2 in (1.88 m)
- Listed weight: 300 lb (136 kg)

Career information
- High school: Riverside (Ellwood City)
- College: Toledo (1994–1997)
- NFL draft: 1998: undrafted

Career history
- Tennessee Oilers (1998)*; Montreal Alouettes (1999–2003)
- * Offseason or practice squad member only

Awards and highlights
- Grey Cup champion (2002); CFL East All-Star (1999); First-team All-MAC (1997); Second-team All-MAC (1996)

Career CFL statistics
- Games played: 67
- Tackles: 110
- Sacks: 13
- Pass deflections: 3
- Forced fumbles: 1
- Fumble recoveries: 4
- Stats at CFL.ca

Jason Richards (born November 17, 1975) is an American former professional football defensive tackle and long snapper who played in the Canadian Football League (CFL) for the Montreal Alouettes. He played college football for the Toledo Rockets.

== Early life ==
Richards was born on November 17, 1975, in Ellwood City, Pennsylvania. He attended Riverside High School in Ellwood City.

== College career ==
Richards played college football for the Toledo Rockets from 1994 to 1997 and was a four-year letterman. As a senior, he had 73 tackles, including 12 for loss and five sacks. Richards earned second-team All-Mid-American Conference and first-team All-MAC in 1996 and 1997 respectively.

== Professional career ==
=== Tennessee Oilers ===
After going undrafted in the 1998 NFL draft, Richards signed with the Tennessee Oilers as an undrafted free agent. On August 21, he was waived by the team.

=== Montreal Alouettes ===
On March 11, 1999, Richards was signed by the Montreal Alouettes of the Canadian Football League (CFL). In 18 games, he had 23 tackles, nine sacks, one pass deflection and one fumble recovery. At the end of the season, Richards was named to the CFL East All-Star team.

In 2000, Richards recorded 36 tackles, two sacks and one fumble recovery. In the 88th Grey Cup, with two minutes remaining, he made contact with BC Lions quarterback Damon Allen after the whistle was blown for a time count violation. The resulting roughing penalty allowed Lui Passaglia to kick a field goal and extend the lead to eight. The Alouettes lost the Grey Cup, 26–28. On November 28, Richards signed a two-year contract extension with the team.

In 2001, Richards played in 16 games, where he had 32 tackles, one pass break up and one fumble recovery. On July 15, he was involved in an accident when a Jeep Cherokee, driven by teammate Éric Lapointe, went off the road. In the car were Alouettes players, Sylvain Girard, Lapointe, Richards and two female passengers, all suffering minor injuries. In 2002, he registered 15 tackles, two sacks, one forced fumble and one fumble recovery as the team won the 90th Grey Cup over the Edmonton Eskimos. Richards also served as the team's long snapper.

On June 12, 2003, he was released by the team. After he was released, he returned Ellwood City and worked in construction. While duck and goose hunting in North Dakota, Richards received a call from Montreal general manager, Jim Popp. On November 1, Richards was re-signed by the Alouettes. In the East Division Finals, he had four tackles on special teams. Richards also served as the long snapper in the 91st Grey Cup. On May 28, 2004, he was released by the team.
