= Maurice Kelly (gridiron football) =

American gridiron football player (born 1972)

No. 11, 16, 24, 33
- Position: Defensive back

Personal information
- Born: October 9, 1972 (age 54); Orangeburg, South Carolina, U.S.
- Listed height: 6 ft 2 in (1.88 m)
- Listed weight: 205 lb (93 kg)

Career information
- High school: Orangeburg-Wilkinson
- College: East Tennessee State

Career history
- Las Vegas Posse (1994); Toronto Argonauts (1995); BC Lions (1996–1997); Winnipeg Blue Bombers (1998–1999); Seattle Seahawks (2000–2001); Winnipeg Blue Bombers (2003–2004)

Awards and highlights
- 2× CFL All-Star (1997, 1999); CFL West All-Star (1997); CFL East All-Star (1999)
- Stats at Pro Football Reference

Maurice Kelly (born October 9, 1972) is an American former professional football defensive back who played in the National Football League (NFL) and Canadian Football League (CFL). He played college football at East Tennessee State University. He was also a member of the Seattle Seahawks of the NFL, and the Las Vegas Posse, Toronto Argonauts, BC Lions and Winnipeg Blue Bombers of the CFL.

== Early life and college ==
Maurice Kelly was born on October 9, 1972, in Orangeburg, South Carolina. He attended Orangeburg-Wilkinson Senior High School in Orangeburg.

Kelly was a four-year letterman for the East Tennessee State Buccaneers of East Tennessee State University from 1990 to 1993.

== Professional career ==
Kelly signed with the Las Vegas Posse of the Canadian Football League (CFL) after going undrafted in the 1994 NFL draft. He dressed in all 18 games for the Posse during the 1994 season, recording 83 defensive tackles, 16 special teams tackles, four interceptions, and 15 pass breakups. Las Vegas finished the year 5–13 and folded after the season.

On April 18, 1995, Kelly was selected by the Toronto Argonauts of the CFL in a dispersal draft. He dressed in 15 games for Toronto in 1995, totaling 51 defensive tackles, seven special teams tackles, one interception, and four pass breakups.

Kelly became a free agent after the 1995 season and signed with the CFL's BC Lions on March 14, 1996. He dressed in all 18 games during the 1996 season, posting 40 defensive tackles, 18 special teams tackles, and five pass breakups as the Lions went 5–13. Kelly dressed in 18 games for the second straight year in 1997, totaling 68 defensive tackles, five special teams tackles, three sacks, five forced fumbles, four interceptions, and three pass breakups as the Lions finished 8–10. Kelly was named a CFL All-Star and a CFL West All-Star for his performance during the 1997 season.

On February 16, 1998, Kelly signed with the Winnipeg Blue Bombers of the CFL during free agency. He dressed in all 18 games for the third consecutive season in 1998, recording 75 defensive tackles, nine special teams tackles, one sack, four forced fumbles, four pass breakups, and five interceptions for 121 yards and one touchdown. Kelly earned CFLPA All-Star honors for the 1998 season as Winnipeg finished 3–15. Kelly dressed in all 18 games for his fourth straight CFL season in 1999, accumulating 87 defensive tackles, seven special teams tackles, five sacks, three forced fumbles, two interceptions, and two pass breakups. He was named a CFL All-Star and a CFL East All-Star for his performance that year. Despite Kelly's strong season, Winnipeg finished with a losing record again, going 6–12.

Kelly became a free agent after the 1999 CFL season and signed with the Seattle Seahawks of the National Football League (NFL) on April 24, 2000. He played in all 16 games for the Seahawks during his rookie NFL season in 2000, posting ten solo tackles and three assisted tackles. He played in eight games, starting three, for Seattle in 2001, recording 22 solo tackles, ten assisted tackles, and one pass breakup before being placed on injured reserve on November 14, 2001. Kelly was released by the Seahawks on August 26, 2002.

Kelly re-signed with the Blue Bombers on May 28, 2003. He dressed in 17 games, starting 14, during the 2003 season, totaling 58 defensive tackles, 22 special teams tackles, two forced fumbles, one interception, two pass breakups, and one blocked kick. He started all 18 games during his final CFL season in 2004, recording 64 defensive tackles, 21 special teams tackles, one sack, one forced fumble, and one interception. Winnipeg finished the 2004 season with a 7–11 record.

== Post-playing career ==
Kelly retired from the CFL in May 2005 to become the director of player development for the Seahawks. He served as the director of player development from 2005 to 2011, the senior director of player development from 2012 to 2015, and the vice president of player engagement from 2016 to 2022. He was promoted to vice president of player affairs in 2023.
