= Demetrious Maxie =

American gridiron football player and coach (born 1973)

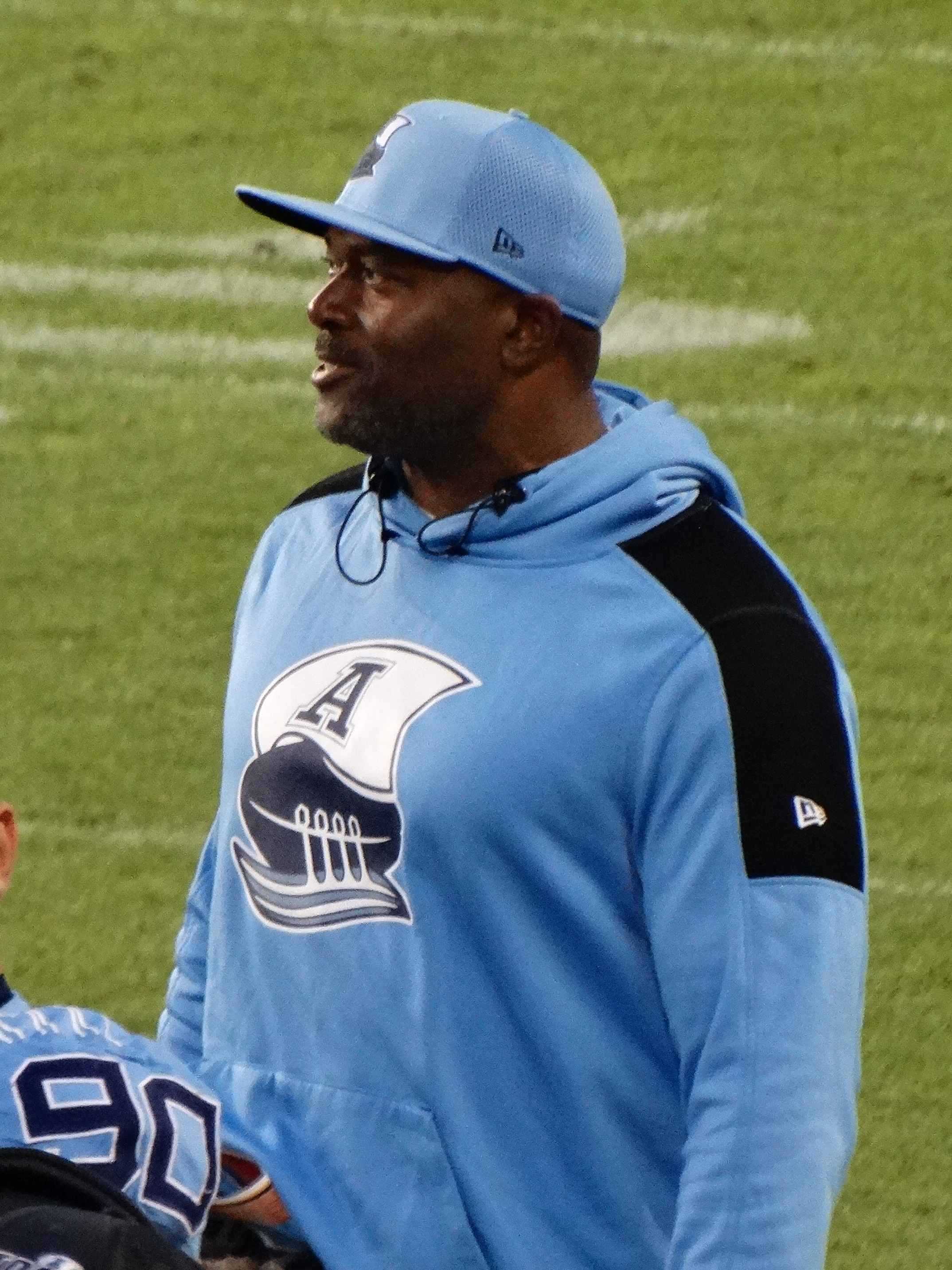
- Maxie with the Toronto Argonauts in 2024

Toronto Argonauts
- Title: Linebackers coach Assistant head coach
- CFL status: American

Personal information
- Born: October 18, 1973 (age 53); Shreveport, Louisiana, U.S.
- Listed height: 6 ft 3 in (1.91 m)
- Listed weight: 270 lb (122 kg)

Career information
- Position: Defensive end
- College: Texas-El Paso

Career history

Playing
- 1995: Baltimore Stallions
- 1996: Montreal Alouettes
- 1996–1999: Toronto Argonauts
- 2000–2001: Saskatchewan Roughriders
- 2002: Toronto Argonauts
- 2003–2007: Calgary Stampeders

Coaching
- 2016–2017: Edmonton Eskimos (Linebackers coach)
- 2018–2023: Edmonton Eskimos / Elks (Defensive line coach)
- 2024: Toronto Argonauts (Defensive line coach)
- 2025: Edmonton Elks (Special teams coordinator, Defensive assistant)
- 2026–present: Toronto Argonauts (Defensive line coach, Assistant head coach)

Awards and highlights
- 4× Grey Cup champion (1995, 1996, 1997, 2024); 2× CFL All-Star (1999, 2000); CFL East All-Star (1999); CFL West All-Star (2000)
- Stats at CFL.ca (archive)

Demetrious Maxie (born October 18, 1973) is the linebackers coach and assistant head coach for the Toronto Argonauts of the Canadian Football League (CFL). He is a former professional gridiron football defensive end.

== Professional career ==
While playing with the Baltimore Stallions, Maxie won the only Grey Cup by a non-Canadian team, and followed with two wins with the Toronto Argonauts.

== Coaching career ==
=== Edmonton Eskimos / Elks (first stint) ===
Maxie first served as the linebackers coach for the Edmonton Eskimos in 2016. He then moved to the defensive line in 2018 and served in that capacity until 2023.

=== Toronto Argonauts (first stint) ===
On January 22, 2024, it was announced that Maxie had joined the Toronto Argonauts to serve as their defensive line coach. He won the 111th Grey Cup in his first year with the Argonauts.

=== Edmonton Elks (second stint) ===
On January 10, 2025, the Edmonton Elks announced that Maxie was named the team's special teams coordinator and defensive assistant.

=== Toronto Argonauts (second stint) ===
It was announced on January 8, 2026, that Maxie had re-joined the Argonauts to serve as their defensive line coach and assistant head coach.
