= Gerald Vaughn =

American gridiron football player (born 1970)

No. 39
- Position: Defensive back

Personal information
- Born: April 8, 1970 (age 56); Abbeville, Mississippi, U.S.

Career information
- College: Mississippi

Career history
- 1993–1995: Calgary Stampeders
- 1996: Winnipeg Blue Bombers
- 1997–2001: Hamilton Tiger-Cats
- 2002–2005: Ottawa Renegades

Awards and highlights
- Grey Cup champion (1999); 2× CFL All-Star (1998, 1999); 2× CFL East All-Star (1998, 1999); Most blocked kicks in a game (2, tied)

Gerald Vaughn (born April 8, 1970) is a former Canadian Football League defensive back who played 13 seasons for four different teams. He was a two time All-Star. He attended the University of Mississippi.
