= Guirado =

Guirado is a surname. Notable people with the surname include:

- Ángel Guirado (born 1984), Filipino footballer
- Guilhem Guirado (born 1986), French rugby union player
- Javier Guirado (born 1985), Spanish weightlifter
- Juan Antonio Guirado (1932-2010), Spanish artist
- Catalina Guirado (born 1974), British-New Zealander model and TV star
- Juan Luis Guirado (born 1979), Filipino footballer
- Marcela Guirado (born 1989), Mexican actress and singer
