= Val St. Germain =

Canadian football player (born 1971)

Profile
- Position: Guard

Personal information
- Born: October 8, 1971 (age 55); Ottawa, Ontario, Canada

Career information
- University: McGill
- CFL draft: 1994

Career history
- 1994–1998: Hamilton Tiger-Cats
- 1999–2001: Edmonton Eskimos
- 2002–2005: Ottawa Renegades
- 2006: Winnipeg Blue Bombers
- 2007: Saskatchewan Roughriders

Awards and highlights
- 2× CFL East All-Star (1998, 2003); CFL West All-Star (1999)

Val St. Germain is a Canadian former professional football offensive lineman who played fourteen seasons in the Canadian Football League for the Hamilton Tiger-Cats, Edmonton Eskimos, Ottawa Renegades, Winnipeg Blue Bombers, and Saskatchewan Roughriders. St. Germain was named Division All-Star in 1998, 1999 and 2003. He won one Grey Cup championship, coming in his final year in 2007. He played college football at McGill University.

He officially announced his retirement from professional football on January 31, 2008.
