= Travis Moore =

American gridiron football player and coach (born 1970)

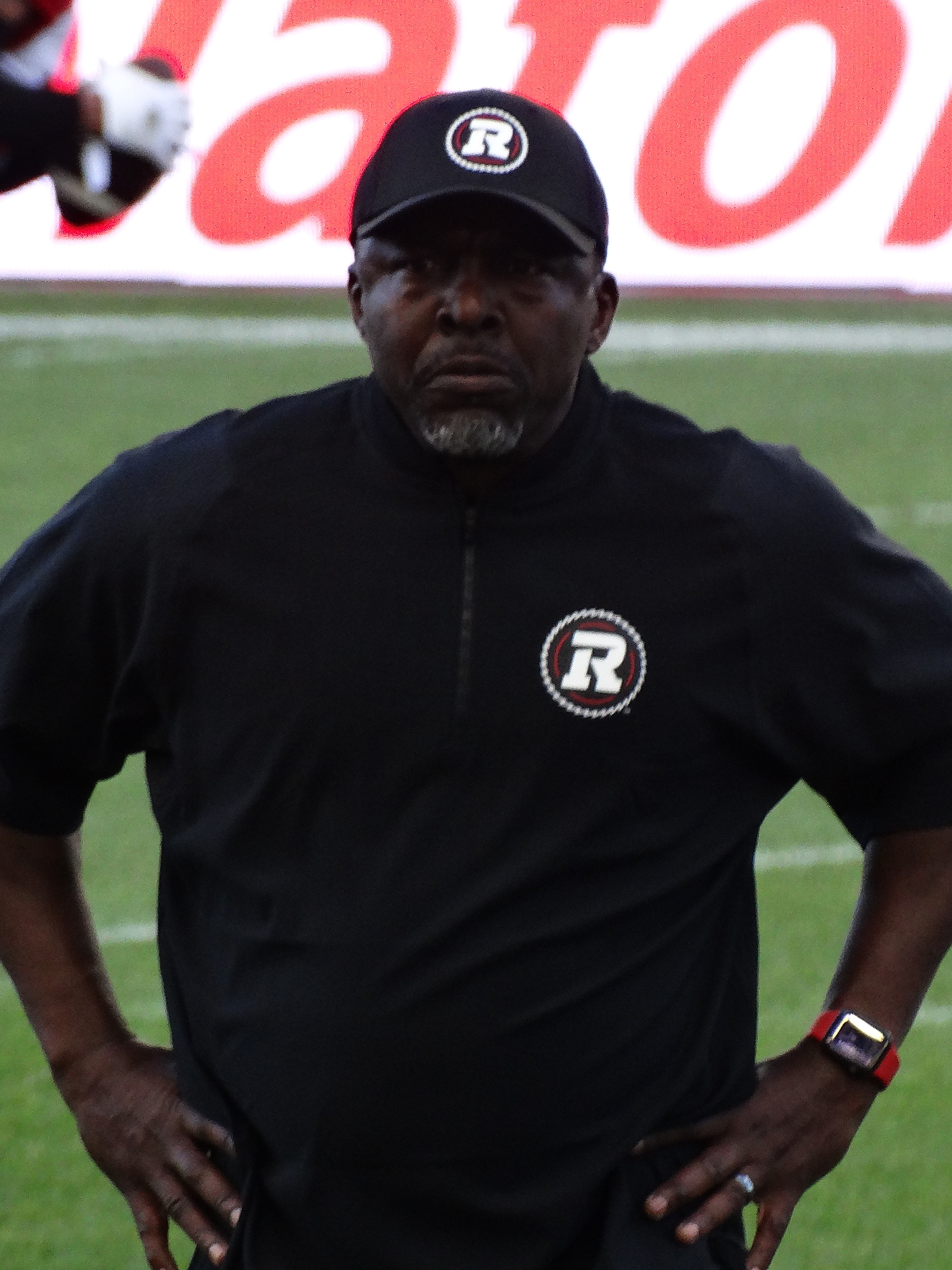
- Moore with the Ottawa Redblacks in 2023

No. 83
- Position: Slotback

Personal information
- Born: August 5, 1970 (age 56); Santa Monica, California, U.S.
- Listed height: 6 ft 1 in (1.85 m)
- Listed weight: 193 lb (88 kg)

Career information
- College: Ball State

Career history

Playing
- 1996–2002: Calgary Stampeders
- 2001: San Francisco Demons
- 2003–2005: Saskatchewan Roughriders

Coaching
- 2009: Hamilton Tiger-Cats (RB)
- 2010–2012: BC Lions (WR)
- 2013: Edmonton Eskimos (WR)
- 2014–2017: Ottawa Redblacks (WR)
- 2018–2022: Saskatchewan Roughriders (WR)
- 2023–2024: Ottawa Redblacks (WR)

Awards and highlights
- 4× Grey Cup champion (1998, 2001, 2011, 2016); 3× CFL All-Star (1999, 2000, 2001); 3× CFL West All-Star (1999, 2000, 2001)
- Stats at CFL.ca (archive)

Travis Moore (born August 5, 1970) is an American former professional football player and coach. He was most recently the receivers coach for the Ottawa Redblacks of the Canadian Football League (CFL). Moore has also been a coach for the Hamilton Tiger-Cats, BC Lions, Edmonton Eskimos and Saskatchewan Roughriders. As a player, Moore played 10 seasons as a slotback for the Calgary Stampeders and the Saskatchewan Roughriders, winning two Grey Cup championships with the Stampeders in 1998 and 2001. He also played in the one and only XFL season as a wide receiver for the San Francisco Demons team that competed in the league's championship game.

== Coaching career ==
On November 1, 2022, after a disappointing season, the Riders announced they would not be renewing Moore's contract, along with three other offensive coaches. On December 21, 2022, the Redblacks announced that Moore would rejoin Ottawa for the 2023 season as the team's receivers and pass game coordinator coach. Moore had previously been a member of the Redblacks' coaching staff from 2014 to 2017. On May 8, 2025, it was announced that Moore had resigned for personal reasons.

== Political involvement ==
In February 2022, Moore donated US$17,760 to the Canada convoy protest through their GiveSendGo campaign.
