= Paul Girodo =

Canadian football player (born 1973)

No. 27, 19, 11
- Position: Linebacker

Personal information
- Born: August 6, 1973 (age 53); Ottawa, Ontario, Canada
- Listed height: 5 ft 11 in (1.80 m)
- Listed weight: 210 lb (95 kg)

Career information
- University: UBC

Career history
- 1998–1999: Winnipeg Blue Bombers
- 1999–2000: Saskatchewan Roughriders

Paul Girodo (born August 6, 1973) is a Canadian former professional football linebacker who played three seasons in the Canadian Football League (CFL) with the Winnipeg Blue Bombers and Saskatchewan Roughriders. He played CIS football for the UBC Thunderbirds of the University of British Columbia.

== Early life ==
Paul Girodo was born on August 6, 1973, in Ottawa. He played CIS football for the UBC Thunderbirds of the University of British Columbia, with his final year being in 1997.

== Professional career ==
Girodo dressed in six games for the Winnipeg Blue Bombers of the Canadian Football League (CFL) in 1998, posting two special teams tackles. He wore jersey number 27 during the 1998 season. He switched to number 19 in 1999 and dressed in five games for the Blue Bombers that year but did not record any statistics. Girodo was released on August 16, 1999.

Girodo was then signed by the Saskatchewan Roughriders of the CFL in August 1999. He dressed in ten games for the Roughriders during the 1999 season, totaling seven special teams tackles and one forced fumble. He dressed in five games in 2000, recording one special teams tackle and one fumble recovery, before being released on August 9, 2000. Girodo wore number 11 with the Roughriders.
