= 1999 Edmonton Eskimos season =

Canadian football team season

- General manager: Tom Higgins
- Head coach: Don Matthews
- Home stadium: Commonwealth Stadium

Results
- Record: 6–12
- Division place: 3rd West
- Playoffs: Lost West Semi-Final

The 1999 Edmonton Eskimos, coached by Don Matthews, finished in third place in the West Division with a 6–12 record. They were defeated in the West Semi-Final by the Calgary Stampeders.

== Offseason ==
=== CFL draft ===
Round	Pick	Player	Position	School
1	4	Trevor Bollers	FB	Iowa
2	9	Aaron Williams	DE	Indiana
3	20	Éric LaPointe	RB	Mount Allison
4	28	Brent Walker	WR	Mary
5	35	Frantz Clarkson	CB	Manitoba
6	43	Orlando Bowen	DE	Northern Illinois

== Preseason ==
=== Schedule ===
Week	Date	Opponent	Score	Result	Attendance
A	June 23	vs Saskatchewan Roughriders	27–3	W	35313
B	June 30	at British Columbia Lions	49–9	W	13258

== Regular season ==
=== Season standings ===
West Division
Pos	Team	Pld	W	L	T	PF	PA	PD	Pts
1	BC Lions (C, Q)	18	13	5	0	429	373	+56	26
2	Calgary Stampeders (Q)	18	12	6	0	503	393	+110	24
3	Edmonton Eskimos (Q)	18	6	12	0	459	502	−43	12
4	Saskatchewan Roughriders	18	3	15	0	370	592	−222	6

Source: "1999 CFL regular season standings". Archived from the original on 2009-06-29.
(C) First round bye; (Q) Qualified for playoffs

=== Season schedule ===
Week	Date	Opponent	Score	Result	Attendance	Record	Streak	Starting QB
1	July 9	vs British Columbia Lions	25–13	L	33404	0–1	L1	Greene
2	July 16	vs Saskatchewan Roughriders	39–6	W	32113	1–1	W1	Greene
3	July 22	at Calgary Stampeders	41–37	L	31246	1–2	L1	Greene
4	July 29	at Hamilton Tiger-Cats	54–8	L	16815	1–3	L2	Greene
5	August 6	vs Montreal Alouettes	20–13	L	33154	1–4	L3	Greene
6	August 13	at Winnipeg Blue Bombers	56–26	W	22454	2–4	W2	Greene
7	August 20	at Saskatchewan Roughriders	29–27	L	16544	2–5	L1	Greene
8	August 27	vs Hamilton Tiger-Cats	30–23	OTL	34180	2–6	L2	Crandell
9	September 6	at Calgary Stampeders	33–30	OTW	37611	3–6	W1	Greene
10	September 10	vs Calgary Stampeders	38–13	L	52458*	3–7	L1	Greene
11	September 17	at Saskatchewan Roughriders	41–38	W	18321	4–7	W1	Mason
12	September 26	vs Toronto Argonauts	20–16	L	31085	4–8	L1	Mason
13	October 3	vs Winnipeg Blue Bombers	27–19	L	27211	4–9	L2	Greene
14	October 11	at British Columbia Lions	26–20	W	26177	5–9	W1	Greene
15	October 17	vs British Columbia Lions	21–13	OTL	30713	5–10	L1	Crowley
16	October 23	at Montreal Alouettes	36–33	L	19461	5–11	L2	Crandell
17	October 30	vs Saskatchewan Roughriders	34–21	W	33850	6–11	W1	Mason
18	November 6	at Toronto Argonauts	20–15	L	19460	6–12	L1	Greene

*Top attendance in CFL

Awards and records

=== Statistics ===
	Games			Passing				
	GD	GS	Record	Cmp	Att	Yds	TD	Int
Nealon Greene	15	12	4–8	158	287	2,046	14	12
Marcus Crandell	13	2	0–2	59	112	767	3	5
Kevin Mason	9	3	2–1	37	80	451	3	5
Dan Crowley	18	1	0–1	22	49	216	0	3
		18	6–12	277	529	3,469	20	25

=== Offence ===
- OG – Leo Groenewegen

=== Offence ===
- OG – Leo Groenewegen, Edmonton Eskimos
- OG – Val St. Germain, Edmonton Eskimos

=== Defence ===
- DT – Doug Petersen, Edmonton Eskimos
- LB – Terry Ray, Edmonton Eskimos

== Playoffs ==
The Eskimos were defeated in the West Semi-Final by the Calgary Stampeders, 30–17.

Team	Q1	Q2	Q3	Q4	Tot
Calgary Stampeders	7	14	6	3	30
Edmonton Eskimos	0	3	7	7	17

== Roster ==
1999 Edmonton Eskimos final roster
Quarterbacks: 9 Marcus Crandell; 7 Dan Crowley; 15 Nealon Greene; Running backs: 23 Scott Deibert; 25 Sean Millington; 22 Troy Mills; Receivers: 87 Donnie Ashley; 83 Andre Batson; 81 Ed Hervey; 31 Marc Tobert; 3 Terry Vaughn; 13 Rick Walters; 2 Gizmo Williams	Offensive linemen: 62 Bruce Beaton T/C; 56 Hicham El-Mashtoub C; 59 Leo Groenewegen G; 54 David Heasman T; 60 Chris Morris T; 57 Val St. Germain G; Defensive linemen: 89 Leroy Blugh DE; 92 Robert Brown DT; 47 Grant Carter DE; 46 Malvin Hunter DE; 55 Eric Johnson DT; 94 Doug Petersen DT; 43 Jed Roberts DE	Linebackers: 30 Charles Assmann LS; 41 A. J. Gass; 44 Philippe Girard; 36 Justin Ring; Defensive backs: 10 Charles Anthony; 27 Eric Edwards; 5 Anthony Fogle; 8 Chris Hardy; 4 Torey Hunter; 29 Picasso Nelson; 28 Terry Ray; 17 Marcello Simmons; Special teams: 3 Sean Fleming K/P	Injured list: 6 Fred Bailey WR; 86 Phillip Bobo WR; 51 Samir Chahine G; 37 Patrice Denis LB; 98 B. J. Gallis LB; 90 Tyrone Hines LB; 14 Matt Kellett K/P; 38 Errol Martin LB; 12 Kevin Mason QB; 24 Kavis Reed DB; 16 Ken Watson DB; Italics indicate American player
