= 1999 CFL season =

Canadian Football League season

- Duration: July 7 – November 7, 1999
- East champions: Hamilton Tiger-Cats
- West champions: Calgary Stampeders

87th Grey Cup
- Date: November 28, 1999
- Venue: BC Place Stadium, Vancouver
- Champions: Hamilton Tiger-Cats

CFL seasons
- ← 1998 2000 →

Canadian Football League team locations: West, East

The 1999 CFL season is considered to be the 46th season in modern-day Canadian football, although it is officially the 42nd Canadian Football League season.

== CFL news in 1999 ==
The CFL enters the final season of the 1900s with increased growth in attendance and television ratings after the '98 season.

The '98 season attendance figures showed a 6.1% increase, which surpassed '97 season figures. TSN television ratings grew by 26.6% in the ages 2+ demographic.

The 1998 Grey Cup game viewership increased to 20.5% as 3.06 million viewers watched the Calgary Stampeders defeat the Hamilton Tiger-Cats, 26–24, which surpassed the '97 Grey Cup game.

The 1999 CFL season, along with the 2001 CFL season, would be one of the closest times where an East Division team could have crossed over to the West Division for that division's last playoff spot since the introduction of the Cross over in 1997. The Winnipeg Blue Bombers had to only win one more game to go 7–11, to beat the Edmonton Eskimos final standings, both teams finishing with a tie of 6–12 instead, and under the current rule, even if the team in 4th place in the other division has a better season series record (most wins in the match ups between the teams, or most points scored in total in those games), in which case both were tied again and Edmonton still wins the tie with a 75–53 in two games, for a team to cross over it must have a better final standing win record than the 3rd placed team in the other division, so there was no cross over.

== Regular season standings ==
West Division
Pos	Team	Pld	W	L	T	PF	PA	PD	Pts
1	BC Lions (C, Q)	18	13	5	0	429	373	+56	26
2	Calgary Stampeders (Q)	18	12	6	0	503	393	+110	24
3	Edmonton Eskimos (Q)	18	6	12	0	459	502	−43	12
4	Saskatchewan Roughriders	18	3	15	0	370	592	−222	6

Source: "1999 CFL regular season standings". Archived from the original on June 29, 2009.
(C) First round bye; (Q) Qualified for playoffs

East Division
Pos	Team	Pld	W	L	T	PF	PA	PD	Pts
1	Montreal Alouettes (C, Q)	18	12	6	0	495	395	+100	24
2	Hamilton Tiger-Cats (Q)	18	11	7	0	603	378	+225	22
3	Toronto Argonauts (Q)	18	9	9	0	386	373	+13	18
4	Winnipeg Blue Bombers	18	6	12	0	362	601	−239	12

Source: "1999 CFL regular season standings". Archived from the original on June 29, 2009.
(C) First round bye; (Q) Qualified for playoffs

BC and Montreal both have first round byes.

== Grey Cup playoffs ==
The Hamilton Tiger-Cats are the 1999 Grey Cup Champions, avenging last season's championship loss to the Calgary Stampeders with a 32–21 victory, at Vancouver's BC Place Stadium. The Tiger-Cats have won their first championship since the 1986 CFL season. The Tiger-Cats' Danny McManus (QB) was named the Grey Cup's Most Valuable Player and Mike Morreale (SB) was the Grey Cup's Most Valuable Canadian.

=== Playoff bracket ===
November 14: Division Semifinals
East
E3	Toronto Argonauts	6
E2	Hamilton Tiger-Cats	27
West
W3	Edmonton Eskimos	17
W2	Calgary Stampeders	30

November 21: Division Finals
E2	Hamilton Tiger-Cats	27
E1	Montreal Alouettes	26
W2	Calgary Stampeders	26
W1	BC Lions	24

November 28: 87th Grey Cup @ BC Place Stadium – Vancouver, BC
E2	Hamilton Tiger-Cats	32
W2	Calgary Stampeders	21

== CFL leaders ==
- CFL passing leaders
- CFL rushing leaders
- CFL receiving leaders

== 1999 CFL All-Stars ==
=== Offence ===
- QB – Danny McManus, Hamilton Tiger-Cats
- RB – Kelvin Anderson, Calgary Stampeders
- RB – Mike Pringle, Montreal Alouettes
- SB – Darren Flutie, Hamilton Tiger-Cats
- SB – Allen Pitts, Calgary Stampeders
- WR – Ben Cahoon, Montreal Alouettes
- WR – Travis Moore, Calgary Stampeders
- C – Jamie Taras, BC Lions
- OG – Leo Groenewegen, Edmonton Eskimos
- OG – Pierre Vercheval, Montreal Alouettes
- OT – Uzooma Okeke, Montreal Alouettes
- OT – Rocco Romano, Calgary Stampeders

=== Defence ===
- DT – Demetrious Maxie, Toronto Argonauts
- DT – Johnny Scott, BC Lions
- DE – Daved Benefield, BC Lions
- DE – Joe Montford, Hamilton Tiger-Cats
- LB – Calvin Tiggle, Hamilton Tiger-Cats
- LB – Mike O'Shea, Toronto Argonauts
- LB – Maurice Kelly, Winnipeg Blue Bombers
- CB – William Hampton, Calgary Stampeders
- CB – Adrion Smith, Toronto Argonauts
- DB – Gerald Vaughn, Hamilton Tiger-Cats
- DB – Barron Miles, Montreal Alouettes
- DS – Rob Hitchcock, Hamilton Tiger-Cats

=== Special teams ===
- P – Noel Prefontaine, Toronto Argonauts
- K – Mark McLoughlin, Calgary Stampeders
- ST – Jimmy Cunningham, BC Lions

== 1999 Western All-Stars ==
=== Offence ===
- QB – Damon Allen, BC Lions
- RB – Kelvin Anderson, Calgary Stampeders
- RB – Robert Drummond, BC Lions
- SB – Terry Vaughn, Edmonton Eskimos
- SB – Allen Pitts, Calgary Stampeders
- WR – Eddie Brown, BC Lions
- WR – Travis Moore, Calgary Stampeders
- C – Jamie Taras, BC Lions
- OG – Leo Groenewegen, Edmonton Eskimos
- OG – Val St. Germain, Edmonton Eskimos
- OT – John Terry, Saskatchewan Roughriders
- OT – Rocco Romano, Calgary Stampeders

=== Defence ===
- DT – Doug Petersen, Edmonton Eskimos
- DT – Johnny Scott, BC Lions
- DE – Daved Benefield, BC Lions
- DE – Neil Smith, Saskatchewan Roughriders
- LB – Paul Lacoste, BC Lions
- LB – Terry Ray, Edmonton Eskimos
- LB – Willie Pless, Saskatchewan Roughriders
- CB – William Hampton, Calgary Stampeders
- CB – Eric Carter, BC Lions
- DB – Dale Joseph, BC Lions
- DB – Jack Kellogg, Calgary Stampeders
- DS – Greg Frers, Calgary Stampeders

=== Special teams ===
- P – Lui Passaglia, BC Lions
- K – Mark McLoughlin, Calgary Stampeders
- ST – Jimmy Cunningham, BC Lions

== 1999 Eastern All-Stars ==
=== Offence ===
- QB – Danny McManus, Hamilton Tiger-Cats
- RB – Ronald Williams, Hamilton Tiger-Cats
- RB – Mike Pringle, Montreal Alouettes
- SB – Darren Flutie, Hamilton Tiger-Cats
- SB – Milt Stegall, Winnipeg Blue Bombers
- WR – Ben Cahoon, Montreal Alouettes
- WR – Robert Gordon, Winnipeg Blue Bombers
- C – Carl Coulter, Hamilton Tiger-Cats
- OG – Chris Burns, Hamilton Tiger-Cats
- OG – Pierre Vercheval, Montreal Alouettes
- OT – Uzooma Okeke, Montreal Alouettes
- OT – Dave Hack, Hamilton Tiger-Cats

=== Defence ===
- DT – Demetrious Maxie, Toronto Argonauts
- DT – Jason Richards, Montreal Alouettes
- DE – Elfrid Payton, Montreal Alouettes
- DE – Joe Montford, Hamilton Tiger-Cats
- LB – Calvin Tiggle, Hamilton Tiger-Cats
- LB – Mike O'Shea, Toronto Argonauts
- LB – Maurice Kelly, Winnipeg Blue Bombers
- CB – Irvin Smith, Montreal Alouettes
- CB – Adrion Smith, Toronto Argonauts
- DB – Gerald Vaughn, Hamilton Tiger-Cats
- DB – Barron Miles, Montreal Alouettes
- DS – Rob Hitchcock, Hamilton Tiger-Cats

=== Special teams ===
- P – Noel Prefontaine, Toronto Argonauts
- K – Paul Osbaldiston, Hamilton Tiger-Cats
- ST – Wade Miller, Winnipeg Blue Bombers

== 1999 Intergold CFLPA All-Stars ==
=== Offence ===
- QB – Damon Allen, BC Lions
- OT – Uzooma Okeke, Montreal Alouettes
- OT – Chris Perez, Winnipeg Blue Bombers
- OG – Fred Childress, Calgary Stampeders
- OG – Val St. Germain, Edmonton Eskimos
- C – Jamie Taras, BC Lions
- RB – Mike Pringle, Montreal Alouettes
- FB – Michael Soles, Montreal Alouettes
- SB – Allen Pitts, Calgary Stampeders
- SB – Darren Flutie, Hamilton Tiger-Cats
- WR – Milt Stegall, Winnipeg Blue Bombers
- WR – Travis Moore, Calgary Stampeders

=== Defence ===
- DE – Joe Montford, Hamilton Tiger-Cats
- DE – Elfrid Payton, Montreal Alouettes
- DT – Johnny Scott, BC Lions
- DT – Ed Philion, Montreal Alouettes
- LB – Alondra Johnson, Calgary Stampeders
- LB – Darryl Hall, Calgary Stampeders
- LB – Mike O'Shea, Toronto Argonauts
- CB – Adrion Smith, Toronto Argonauts
- CB – Eric Carter, BC Lions
- HB – Gerald Vaughn, Hamilton Tiger-Cats
- HB – Barron Miles, Montreal Alouettes
- S – Lester Smith, Montreal Alouettes

=== Special teams ===
- K – Mark McLoughlin, Calgary Stampeders
- P – Terry Baker, Montreal Alouettes
- ST – Jimmy Cunningham, BC Lions

=== Head coach ===
- Charlie Taaffe, Montreal Alouettes

== 1999 CFL awards ==
- CFL's Most Outstanding Player Award – Danny McManus (QB), Hamilton Tiger-Cats
- CFL's Most Outstanding Canadian Award – Mike O'Shea (LB), Toronto Argonauts
- CFL's Most Outstanding Defensive Player Award – Calvin Tiggle (LB), Hamilton Tiger-Cats
- CFL's Most Outstanding Offensive Lineman Award – Uzooma Okeke (OT), Montreal Alouettes
- CFL's Most Outstanding Rookie Award – Paul Lacoste (LB), BC Lions
- CFL's Most Outstanding Special Teams Award – Jimmy Cunningham (RB), BC Lions
- CFLPA's Outstanding Community Service Award – Jamie Taras (C), BC Lions
- CFL's Coach of the Year – Charlie Taaffe, Montreal Alouettes
- Commissioner's Award - No recipient
