= 2000 Saskatchewan Roughriders season =

CFL team season

- General manager: Roy Shivers
- Head coach: Danny Barrett
- Home stadium: Taylor Field

Results
- Record: 5–12–1
- Division place: 4th, West
- Playoffs: did not qualify
- Team MOP: Henry Burris
- Team MOC: Dan Farthing
- Team MOR: George White

The 2000 Saskatchewan Roughriders finished in fourth place in the West Division with a 5–12–1 record and missed the playoffs for the third year in a row.

== Offseason ==
=== CFL draft ===
Round	Pick	Player	Position	School/Club team
1	1	Tyson St. James	Linebacker	UBC
2	8	Shawn Gallant	Defensive back	Eastern Kentucky
3	15	Dylan Ching	Wide receiver	San Diego
4	23	Michael O'Brien	Quarterback/Punter	Western Ontario
5	31	Hudson Clark	Tight end	Western Ontario
6	39	Jamie Forsythe	Offensive lineman	Western Ontario

=== Preseason ===
Week	Date	Opponent	Score	Result	Attendance
A	Wed, June 21	at Calgary Stampeders	28–14	Loss	30,155
B	Tues, June 27	vs. Edmonton Eskimos	38–23	Loss	22,101

== Regular season ==
=== Season standings ===
West Division
Pos	Team	Pld	W	T	L	OTL	PF	PA	PD	Pts
1	Calgary Stampeders (C, Q)	18	12	1	5	0	604	495	+109	25
2	Edmonton Eskimos (Q)	18	10	0	7	1	527	520	+7	21
3	BC Lions (Q)	18	8	0	9	1	513	529	−16	17
4	Saskatchewan Roughriders	18	5	1	12	0	516	626	−110	11

Source: "CFL.ca". Archived from the original on 2009-06-29.
(C) First round bye; (Q) Qualified for playoffs

=== Season schedule ===
Week	Date	Opponent	Score	Result	Attendance	Record	Streak
1	Thurs, July 6	vs. Toronto Argonauts	36–28	Loss	20,995	0–1	L1
2	Thurs, July 13	at BC Lions	30–28	Loss	28,736	0–2	L2
3	Fri, July 21	at Hamilton Tiger-Cats	40–34	Loss	16,480	0–3	L3
4	Fri, July 28	vs. Calgary Stampeders	52–52	Tie	25,061	0–3–1	T1
5	Thurs, Aug 3	at Montreal Alouettes	62–7	Loss	19,461	0–4–1	L1
6	Fri, Aug 11	vs. Hamilton Tiger-Cats	29–23	Loss	21,116	0–5–1	L2
7	Fri, Aug 18	vs. Edmonton Eskimos	28–22	Loss	21,707	0–6–1	L3
8	Fri, Aug 25	at Edmonton Eskimos	30–20	Win	36,813	1–6–1	W1
9	Sun, Sept 3	vs. Winnipeg Blue Bombers	38–29	Win	30,088	2–6–1	W2
10	Sat, Sept 9	vs. BC Lions	28–20	Win	24,416	3–6–1	W3
11	Fri, Sept 15	at Toronto Argonauts	44–17	Win	28,724	4–6–1	W4
12	Fri, Sept 22	vs. Calgary Stampeders	40–17	Loss	27,141	4–7–1	L1
13	Fri, Sept 29	at Winnipeg Blue Bombers	38–30	Loss	26,041	4–8–1	L2
14	Fri, Oct 6	at Calgary Stampeders	28–18	Loss	35,967	4–9–1	L3
15	Sat, Oct 14	vs. BC Lions	39–15	Loss	24,776	4–10–1	L4
16	Sun, Oct 22	Montreal Alouettes	39–22	Loss	27,138	4–11–1	L5
17	Sat, Oct 28	at Edmonton Eskimos	54–52 (OT)	Win	34,218	5–11–1	W1
18	Sat, Nov 4	at BC Lions	27–26	Loss	33,232	5–12–1	L1

== Roster ==
2000 Saskatchewan Roughriders final roster
Quarterbacks: 1 Henry Burris; 7 Marvin Graves; 9 John Rayborn; Running backs: 8 Darren Davis; 20 Kennedy Nkeyasen; 33 Chris Szarka; Receivers: 86 Demetris Bendross; 22 Dylan Ching; 28 Duane Dmytryshyn; 10 Dan Farthing; 84 Eric Guliford; 88 Curtis Marsh; 88 Ousmane Tounkara	Offensive linemen: 67 Dan Comiskey G; 52 Ben Fairbrother G/T; 68 Andrew Greene G; 60 Gene Makowsky T; 59 James Monroe C; 54 Jeremy O'Day C/T; Defensive linemen: 91 Demetrious Maxie DE; 99 Chance McCarty DE; 92 Sheldon Napastuk NT; 72 Colin Scrivener NT; 43 R-Kal Truluck DE; Special teams: 4 Paul McCallum K/P	Linebackers: 47 Aaron Collins; 93 Derek Krete; 48 Trevis Smith; 45 Randy Srochenski LS; 79 Tyson St. James; 38 George White; Defensive backs: 5 Shawn Gallant; 11 Andrew Henry; 39 Antoine Hunter; 31 LaDouphyous McCalla; 32 Marcus McDavid; 25 Jackie Mitchell; 3 Omarr Morgan; 29 Nate Terry	Injured list: 96 Deli Ali LB; 6 Fred Bailey WR; 13 Jim Ballard QB; 24 Ventson Donelson DB; 83 James Epps WR; 27 Stéphane Fortin DB; -- Anthony McClanahan LB; 51 John Terry T; 35 Dione Tyler RB; Italics indicate American player

== Awards and records ==
=== CFL All-Star Selections ===
- Andrew Greene, Offensive Guard
- Curtis Marsh, Wide Receiver
- Demetrious Maxie, Defensive Tackle
- George White, Linebacker

=== Western All-Star Selections ===
- Andrew Greene, Offensive Guard
- Curtis Marsh, Wide Receiver
- Demetrious Maxie, Defensive Tackle
- George White, Linebacker
