= 1997 Montreal Alouettes season =

Canadian football team season

- Head coach: Dave Ritchie
- Home stadium: Olympic Stadium

Results
- Record: 13–5
- Division place: 2nd, East
- Playoffs: Lost East Final

Uniform

The 1997 Montreal Alouettes finished in second place in the East Division with a 13–5 record. Their season came to a close as the Doug Flutie-led Toronto Argonauts defeated the Alouettes in the Eastern Final. The 1997 team saw major head office changes as Jim Speros sold the team to Bob Wetenhall and Larry Smith assumed the role of president and chief executive officer after resigning as CFL commissioner.

== Offseason ==
=== CFL draft ===
Round	Pick	Player	Position	School/Club team
1	6	Steve Charbonneau	DL	New Hampshire
2	11	Jerome Pathon	WR	Washington
2	14	Ryan Coughlin	OL	McGill
3	21	Bruno Heppell	RB	Western Michigan
4	29	Derek Krete	LB	Western Ontario
4	30	Ryan Carruthers	SB	Calgary
5	38	Andy Brereton	SB	Western Michigan
6	45	Francis Bellefroid	LB	Bishop's

=== Ottawa Rough Riders Dispersal Draft ===
Round	Pick	Name	Pos
1	6	Uzooma Okeke	G
2	14	Swift Burch	DT
3	22	Michael Hendricks	LB
4	29	Robert Stevenson	G
5	32	David Harper	LB

== Preseason ==
Game	Date	Opponent	Results		Venue	Attendance
Game	Date	Opponent	Score	Record	Venue	Attendance
A	June 8	Hamilton Tiger-Cats	W 30–14	1–0	Ivor Wynne Stadium	9,311
C	June 18	Toronto Argonauts	L 0–40	1–1	Olympic Stadium	6,394

== Regular season ==
=== Season standings ===
East Division
Pos	Team	Pld	W	L	T	PF	PA	PD	Pts
1	Toronto Argonauts (C, Q)	18	15	3	0	660	327	+333	30
2	Montreal Alouettes (Q)	18	13	5	0	509	532	−23	26
3	Winnipeg Blue Bombers	18	4	14	0	443	548	−105	8
4	Hamilton Tiger-Cats	18	2	16	0	362	549	−187	4

Source: "1997 Regular Season Standings". Canadian Football League. Archived from the original on 2008-10-29.
(C) First round bye; (Q) Qualified for playoffs

=== Season schedule ===
Week	Game	Date	Opponent	Results		Venue	Attendance
Week	Game	Date	Opponent	Score	Record	Venue	Attendance
1	1	June 27	vs. Hamilton Tiger-Cats	W 27–17	1–0	Olympic Stadium	7,380
2	2	July 3	at Winnipeg Blue Bombers	W 27–24	2–0	Winnipeg Stadium	20,497
3	3	July 9	vs. Calgary Stampeders	W 34–28	3–0	Olympic Stadium	7,669
4	4	July 17	at Edmonton Eskimos	L 0–32	3–1	Commonwealth Stadium	27,811
5	5	July 24	Edmonton Eskimos	L 24–34	3–2	Olympic Stadium	10,025
6	6	July 31	at Toronto Argonauts	L 8–46	3–3	SkyDome	16,218
7	7	Aug 9	at BC Lions	W 45–31	4–3	BC Place Stadium	19,106
8	8	Aug 16	vs. Hamilton Tiger-Cats	W 36–26	5–3	Olympic Stadium	10,039
9	9	Aug 22	at Winnipeg Blue Bombers	W 26–21	6–3	Winnipeg Stadium	19,930
10	10	Aug 30	vs. BC Lions	W 34–33	7–3	Olympic Stadium	11,050
11	11	Sept 6	at Hamilton Tiger-Cats	W 38–18	8–3	Ivor Wynne Stadium	9,253
12	12	Sept 12	vs. Winnipeg Blue Bombers	W 29–28	9–3	Olympic Stadium	10,259
13	13	Sept 21	at Saskatchewan Roughriders	W 24–22	10–3	Taylor Field	25,570
14	14	Sept 28	at Calgary Stampeders	L 22–43	10–4	McMahon Stadium	27,153
15	15	Oct 3	vs. Saskatchewan Roughriders	W 30–29	11–4	Olympic Stadium	12,322
16	16	Oct 11	at Toronto Argonauts	L 21–28	11–5	SkyDome	17,355
17	17	Oct 19	vs. Winnipeg Blue Bombers	W 41–34	12–5	Olympic Stadium	6,721
18	18	Oct 26	at Toronto Argonauts	W 43–38	13–5	Olympic Stadium	10,801

== Roster ==
1997 Montreal Alouettes final roster
Quarterbacks: 13 Marvin Graves; 8 Tracy Ham; Running backs: 30 Bruno Heppell; 27 Mike Pringle; 22 Michael Soles; 39 Alan Wetmore; Receivers: 81 Chris Armstrong; 82 Jock Climie; 3 Mill Coleman; 88 Nigel Williams; 2 Chris Wright	Offensive linemen: 62 Bruce Beaton G; 68 Bryan Chiu C/G; 69 Ryan Coughlin G/T; 64 Mark Dixon G; 66 Neal Fort T; 53 Uzooma Okeke T; 65 Mike Sutherland C; Defensive linemen: 90 Swift Burch DE; 55 Steve Charbonneau DE; 77 Tom Hipsz NT; 56 Elfrid Payton DE; 94 Doug Petersen NT	Linebackers: 95 Ray Bernard; 50 Rahsaan Giddings; 31 Larry McSeed; 47 Stefen Reid; Defensive backs: 6 Hency Charles; 17 Doug Craft; 1 Tom Europe; 25 Charles Gordon; 23 Torey Hunter; 0 Harold Nash; 21 Irvin Smith; 26 Mark Washington	Special teams: 10 Terry Baker K/P; Injured list: 83 Andy Antoine WR; 7 Tracy Gravely LB; 4 Thomas Haskins RB; 12 Larry Jusdanis QB; 16 Spencer McLennan DB; 15 Henry Newby LB; 36 Paul Randolph LB; 97 Edward Thomas LB; 85 Marcus Wall WR; Italics indicate International player

== Playoffs ==
=== East Semi-Final ===
Team	Q1	Q2	Q3	Q4	Total
BC Lions	2	10	16	7	35
Montreal Alouettes	21	21	3	0	45

=== East Final ===
Team	Q1	Q2	Q3	Q4	Total
Montreal Alouettes	1	8	21	0	30
Toronto Argonauts	7	13	3	14	37

== Awards ==
=== 1997 CFL All-Star Selections ===
- Neal Fort – Offensive Tackle
- Uzooma Okeke – Offensive Tackle
- Elfrid Payton – Defensive End
- Doug petersen – Defensive Tackle
- Mike Pringle – Running Back
- Pierre Vercheval – Offensive Guard
