= 2000 Edmonton Eskimos season =

Canadian football team season

- General manager: Tom Higgins
- Head coach: Don Matthews
- Home stadium: Commonwealth Stadium

Results
- Record: 10-8
- Division place: 2nd West
- Playoffs: Lost West Semi-Final

The 2000 Edmonton Eskimos finished second in the West Division with a 10–8–0–1 record, but lost the West Semi-Final to the eventual champion BC Lions.

== Offseason ==
=== CFL draft ===
Round	Pick	Player	Position	School
1	3	Tim Bakker	C	Western Ontario
2	9	Rob Harrod	WR	Ottawa
2	10	Craig Carr	RB	Manitoba
3	17	George Hudson	G	New Mexico State
5	33	Bob Vickers	T	Wilfrid Laurier
6	41	Yves Dossous	LB	Kent State

== Preseason ==
=== Schedule ===
Week	Date	Opponent	Score	Result	Attendance	Record
A	June 21	vs British Columbia Lions	26–21	L	30155	0–1
B	June 27	at Saskatchewan Roughriders	38–23	W	22101	1–1

== Regular season ==
=== Season standings ===
West Division
Pos	Team	Pld	W	L	T	OTL	PF	PA	PD	Pts
1	Calgary Stampeders (C, Q)	18	12	5	1	0	604	495	+109	25
2	Edmonton Eskimos (Q)	18	10	7	0	1	527	520	+7	21
3	BC Lions (Q)	18	8	9	0	1	513	529	−16	17
4	Saskatchewan Roughriders	18	5	12	1	0	516	626	−110	11

Source: "CFL.ca". Archived from the original on 2009-06-29.
(C) First round bye; (Q) Qualified for playoffs

=== Season schedule ===
Week	Date	Opponent	Score	Result	Attendance	Record	Streak
1	July 5	at Calgary Stampeders	44–22	L	34383	0–1	L1
2	July 14	vs Hamilton Tiger-Cats	28–21	L	30033	0–2	L2
3	July 21	vs Winnipeg Blue Bombers	51–49	W	27596	1–2	W1
4	July 27	at British Columbia Lions	29–13	W	23714	2–2	W2
5	August 4	at Hamilton Tiger-Cats	16–10	W	21333	3–2	W3
6	August 11	vs Montreal Alouettes	29–7	W	31472	4–2	W4
7	August 18	at Saskatchewan Roughriders	28–22	W	21707	5–2	W5
8	August 25	vs Saskatchewan Roughriders	30–20	L	36813	5–3	L1
9	September 4	at Calgary Stampeders	30–18	W	35967	6–3	W1
10	September 8	vs Calgary Stampeders	31–10	W	53248*	7–3	W2
11	September 16	at British Columbia Lions	26–14	L	20234	7–4	L1
12	September 22	vs Toronto Argonauts	34-21	L	28649	7–5	L2
13	October 4	vs British Columbia Lions	49–42	W	28865	8–5	W1
14	October 9	at Montreal Alouettes	45–15	L	19461	8–6	L1
15	October 15	vs Calgary Stampeders	33–13	W	34318	9–6	W1
16	October 21	at Toronto Argonauts	48–28	W	18129	10–6	W2
17	October 28	vs Saskatchewan Roughriders	54–52	OTL	34218	10–7–0–1	L1
18	November 3	at Winnipeg Blue Bombers	30–18	L	25537	10–8–0–1	L2

*Top attendance in CFL

== Playoffs ==
Western Semi-Final

Team	Q1	Q2	Q3	Q4	Total
Edmonton Eskimos	3	8	3	18	32
BC Lions	14	3	14	3	34

== Roster ==
2000 Edmonton Eskimos final roster
Quarterbacks: 7 Dan Crowley; 15 Nealon Greene; 12 Jason Maas; Running backs: 34 Shawn Daniels; 20 Troy Mills; 22 Mark Nohra; Receivers: 80 Rob Harrod; 81 Ed Hervey; 85 Kez McCorvey; 3 Terry Vaughn; 13 Rick Walters; 82 Nigel Williams	Offensive linemen: 62 Bruce Beaton C/T; 64 Rick Cunningham T; 59 Leo Groenewegen G; 60 Chris Morris T; 53 Tim Prinsen G; 57 Val St. Germain G; Defensive linemen: 96 Steve Anderson DE; 92 Robert Brown DT; 47 Grant Carter DE; 94 Doug Petersen DT; 95 Albert Reese DT; 76 Jed Roberts DE; 93 Ben Williams DT	Linebackers: 30 Charles Assmann LS; 41 A. J. Gass; 44 Philippe Girard; 36 Justin Ring; 38 Ralph Staten; Defensive backs: 5 Hency Charles; 23 Shannon Garrett; 8 Chris Hardy; 19 Dwight Henry; 4 Torey Hunter; 27 Singor Mobley; 17 Dwayne Provo; 28 Terry Ray	Special teams: 11 Sean Fleming K/P; Injured list: 87 Donnie Ashley WR; 50 Tim Bakker C; 33 Craig Carr RB; 18 Perry Carter DB; 26 Frantz Clarkson DB; 56 George Hudson C; 46 Malvin Hunter DE; 29 Jerome Peterson DB; 2 Gizmo Williams WR; Suspended: 90 Bertrand Berry DE; -- John Northcott G; Italics indicate American player

== Awards and records ==
=== Offence ===
- OT – Bruce Beaton

=== Defence ===
- LB – Terry Ray

== Western All-Star selections ==
=== Offence ===
- SB – Terry Vaughn
- C – Leo Groenewegen
- OT – Bruce Beaton

=== Defence ===
- LB – Terry Ray
- DB – Ralph Staten
