= 1997 Winnipeg Blue Bombers season =

Canadian football team season

- General manager: Jeff Reinebold
- Head coach: Jeff Reinebold
- Home stadium: Winnipeg Stadium

Results
- Record: 4–14
- Division place: 3rd, East
- Playoffs: did not qualify

Uniform

The 1997 Winnipeg Blue Bombers finished in third place in the East Division with a 4–14 record and failed to make the playoffs. This ended the second longest playoff streak in CFL history at 17 years (1980–1996).

== Offseason ==
=== CFL draft ===
Round	Pick	Player	Position	School
3	23 (via Edmonton)	Marice Henriques	S	Colorado
5	38	Jonathan Swift	LB	Tennessee-Martin
6	42	Wayne Weathers	DE	Manitoba

=== Ottawa Rough Riders Dispersal Draft ===
Round	Pick	Player	Pos
2	13	Obrad Spanic	DL
3	21	Stacy Evans	DE
4	28	Lubo Zizakovic	DT

== Regular season ==
=== Season standings ===
East Division
Pos	Team	Pld	W	L	T	PF	PA	PD	Pts
1	Toronto Argonauts (C, Q)	18	15	3	0	660	327	+333	30
2	Montreal Alouettes (Q)	18	13	5	0	509	532	−23	26
3	Winnipeg Blue Bombers	18	4	14	0	443	548	−105	8
4	Hamilton Tiger-Cats	18	2	16	0	362	549	−187	4

Source: "1997 Regular Season Standings". Canadian Football League. Archived from the original on 2008-10-29.
(C) First round bye; (Q) Qualified for playoffs

=== Season schedule ===
Week	Date	Opponent	Result	Record
1	June 27	at Toronto Argonauts	L 23–38	0–1
2	July 3	vs. Montreal Alouettes	L 24–27	0–2
3	July 11	at Hamilton Tiger-Cats	W 33–18	1–2
4	July 19	at BC Lions	L 17–21	1–3
5	July 25	vs. Hamilton Tiger-Cats	L 21–36	1–4
6	Aug 1	at Calgary Stampeders	L 22–43	1–5
7	Aug 7	at Edmonton Eskimos	L 11–45	1–6
8	Aug 14	vs. Calgary Stampeders	L 24–35	1–7
9	Aug 22	vs. Montreal Alouettes	L 21–26	1–8
10	Aug 31	at Saskatchewan Roughriders	W 43–12	2–8
11	Sept 7	vs. Toronto Argonauts	L 25–66	2–9
12	Sept 12	at Montreal Alouettes	L 28–29	2–10
13	Sept 19	vs. BC Lions	W 26–14	3–10
14	Sept 28	vs. Toronto Argonauts	L 9–41	3–11
15	Oct 5	at Hamilton Tiger-Cats	L 25–27	3–12
16	Oct 12	vs. Edmonton Eskimos	L 2–20	3–13
17	Oct 19	at Montreal Alouettes	L 34–41	3–14
18	Oct 24	vs. Saskatchewan Roughriders	W 55–9	4–14

== Roster ==
1997 Winnipeg Blue Bombers final roster
Quarterbacks: 9 Raymond Philyaw; 16 Chris Vargas; Running backs: 5 Dexter Dawson DB; 37 David Pitcher; 25 Ronald Williams; Receivers: 14 Bruce Boyko; 88 Sean Graham; 8 Ted Long; 83 Joseph Rogers; 85 Milt Stegall	Offensive linemen: 59 Craig Hendrickson T; 57 Brett MacNeil G; 66 Mike Mihelic G; 62 Chris Perez T; 69 Frank Rocca C/G; 60 Dave Vankoughnett C; Defensive linemen: 56 Shonte Peoples DE; 90 Rob Robinson DT; 91 Tyrone Rodgers DE; 72 Colin Scrivener DT; 72 Glen Scrivener DT; Special teams: 6 Bob Cameron P; 7 Troy Westwood K	Linebackers: 34 Greg Battle; 51 Grant Carter; 46 Mark Holmstrom; 54 Wade Miller; 48 Dee Osborne; Defensive backs: 20 Sammie Brennan; 26 Reggie Carthon; 36 Rob Davis; 1 Brad Elberg; 33 Nick Ferguson; 23 Shannon Garrett; 3 Brandon Hamilton	Injured list: 17 Allan Boyko SB; 4 Errol Brown DB; 58 Emil Ekiyor DT; 95 Tommy Fagan DE; 24 Courtney Griffin DB; 38 Doug Hocking LB; 44 DeWayne Knight LB; 21 Tyrone Montgomery RB; 50 George Noga DE; 2 Turhon O'Bannon WR; Suspended: 27 Jocelyn Borgella DB; Italics indicate American player

== Awards and records ==
=== 1997 CFL All-Stars ===
- WR – Milt Stegall, CFL All-Star
- ST – Shonte Peoples, CFL All-Star
