= 1997 Saskatchewan Roughriders season =

CFL team season

- General manager: Alan Ford
- Head coach: Jim Daley
- Home stadium: Taylor Field

Results
- Record: 8–10
- Division place: 3rd, West
- Playoffs: Lost Grey Cup
- Team MOP: Bobby Jurasin
- Team MOC: Dan Farthing
- Team MOR: Todd McMillon

The 1997 Saskatchewan Roughriders finished in third place in the West Division with an 8–10 record and lost in the 85th Grey Cup game to the Doug Flutie-led Toronto Argonauts. Despite finishing the season tied with the BC Lions, the Roughriders were placed above the Lions after winning the season series three games to one. The 'Riders proceeded to upset the Calgary Stampeders by a score of 33–30 in the West-Semi Final and then defeated the favoured Edmonton Eskimos 31–30 to proceed to the Grey Cup game.

== Offseason ==
=== CFL draft ===
Round	Pick	Player	Position	School/Club team
1	2	Ben Fairbrother	Offensive lineman	Calgary
2	13	Chris Szarka	Fullback	Eastern Illinois
4	26	Mark Raphael	Cornerback	Ottawa
5	34	Andre Batson	Wide receiver	York
6	42	Dan Comiskey	Offensive Lineman	Windsor

=== Ottawa Rough Riders Dispersal Draft ===
Round	Pick	Player	Pos
0	1	David Archer	QB
1	2	Lamar McGriggs	LB
2	10	Shawn Daniels	FB
3	18	Dave Dinnall	RB
4	26	Profall Grier	RB

=== Preseason ===
Game	Date	Opponent	Results		Venue	Attendance
Game	Date	Opponent	Score	Record	Venue	Attendance
B	Fri, June 13	vs. Winnipeg Blue Bombers	W 39–21	1–0	Taylor Field	19,681
C	Thurs, June 19	at Edmonton Eskimos	L 18–24	1–1	Commonwealth Stadium	32,291

== Regular season ==
=== Season standings ===
West Division
Pos	Team	Pld	W	L	T	PF	PA	PD	Pts
1	Edmonton Eskimos (C, Q)	18	12	6	0	479	400	+79	24
2	Calgary Stampeders (Q)	18	10	8	0	522	442	+80	20
3	Saskatchewan Roughriders (Q)	18	8	10	0	413	479	−66	16
4	BC Lions (Q)	18	8	10	0	429	536	−107	16

Source: "CFL.ca". Archived from the original on 2009-07-15.
(C) First round bye; (Q) Qualified for playoffs

Saskatchewan finished ahead of BC in the standings because they defeated BC in 3 of their 4 regular season meetings.

=== Season schedule ===
Week	Game	Date	Opponent	Results		Venue	Attendance
Week	Game	Date	Opponent	Score	Record	Venue	Attendance
1	1	Thur, June 26	at BC Lions	W 24–23	1–0	BC Place	18,881
2	2	Fri, July 4	vs. Edmonton Eskimos	L 18–24	1–1	Taylor Field	25,751
3	3	Sat, July 12	vs. Toronto Argonauts	W 27–23	2–1	Taylor Field	22,956
4	4	Fri, July 18	at Calgary Stampeders	L 13–22	2–2	McMahon Stadium	30,366
5	5	Sat, July 26	vs. Calgary Stampeders	W 21–19	3–2	Taylor Field	26,483
6	6	Thur, July 31	at Edmonton Eskimos	L 34–37	3–3	Commonwealth Stadium	30,917
7	7	Fri, Aug 8	at Hamilton Tiger-Cats	W 30–20	4–3	Ivor Wynne Stadium	12,582
8	8	Fri, Aug 15	vs. BC Lions	L 26–39	4–4	Taylor Field	28,556
9	9	Thur, Aug 21	at Toronto Argonauts	L 1–27	4–5	SkyDome	17,330
10	10	Sun, Aug 31	vs. Winnipeg Blue Bombers	L 12–43	4–6	Taylor Field	29,788
11	11	Sun, Sept 7	vs. BC Lions	W 46–12	5–6	Taylor Field	22,966
12	12	Sun, Sept 14	at Calgary Stampeders	L 24–28	5–7	McMahon Stadium	28,414
13	13	Sun, Sept 21	vs. Montreal Alouettes	L 22–24	5–8	Taylor Field	25,570
14	14	Sun, Sept 28	vs. Edmonton Eskimos	W 29–5	6–8	Taylor Field	29,361
15	15	Fri, Oct 3	at Montreal Alouettes	L 29–30	6–9	Olympic Stadium	12,322
16	16	Fri, Oct 10	at BC Lions	W 26–19	7–9	BC Place	22,399
17	17	Sun, Oct 19	vs. Hamilton Tiger-Cats	W 22–19	8–9	Taylor Field	31,909
18	18	Fri, Oct 24	at Winnipeg Blue Bombers	L 9–55	8–10	Winnipeg Stadium	30,222

== Roster ==
1997 Saskatchewan Roughriders final roster
Quarterbacks: 11 Kevin Mason; 17 Reggie Slack; Running backs: 35 Shawn Daniels; 20 Darren Joseph; 19 Mike Maurer; 32 Mike Saunders; 33 Chris Szarka; Receivers: 83 Shannon Baker; 10 Dan Farthing; 89 Curtis Mayfield; 80 Don Narcisse; 35 Rick Walters; 85 Tydus Winans	Offensive linemen: 67 Dan Comiskey G; 54 Carl Coulter C; 52 Ben Fairbrother G; 68 Andrew Greene G/T; 60 Gene Makowsky T; 51 John Terry T; Defensive linemen: 46 Troy Alexander DE; 71 Bobby Jurasin DE; 75 John Kropke DT; 91 Nelson Van Waes DT; Special teams: 4 Paul McCallum K/P	Linebackers: 41 Greg Clark; 47 Ron Goetz; 74 Dan Rashovich; 41 Gary Rogers; 45 Randy Srochenski LS; Defensive backs: 3 Bryce Bevill; 38 Patrick Burke; 31 Ryan Carey; 21 Dale Joseph; 22 Jason Mallett; 9 Todd McMillon; 13 Eric Sutton; 2 Terryl Ulmer	Injured list: 24 Ventson Donelson DB; 48 Paul Frlan LB; 1 Profail Grier RB; 88 Rod Harris SB; 63 Scott Hendrickson G; 8 Andrew Henry DB; 99 Will Johnson DE; 7 Heath Rylance QB; 95 Jason Simmons DT; 42 Darnell Small LB; Suspended: 59 James Monroe C; Italics indicate American player

== Awards and records ==
=== CFL All-Star Selections ===
- Bobby Jurasin, Defensive End
- John Terry, Offensive Tackle

=== Western All-Star Selections ===
- Bobby Jurasin, Defensive End
- John Terry, Offensive Tackle
