= 1997 BC Lions season =

Canadian football team season

- Owner: David Braley
- General manager: Adam Rita
- Head coach: Adam Rita
- Home stadium: BC Place Stadium

Results
- Record: 8–10
- Division place: 4th, West
- Playoffs: Lost East Semi-Final

The 1997 BC Lions finished in fourth place in the West Division with an 8–10 record. Because of the "crossover" rule, they appeared in the East Semi-Final. The Lions became the first West Division team to appear in the East Division playoffs, but lost to the Montreal Alouettes.

== Offseason ==
=== CFL draft ===
| Round | Pick | Player | Position | School |
|---|---|---|---|---|
| 2 | 10 | Bob Beveridge | OL | British Columbia |
| 3 | 19 | Paul Stoilen | LB | Simon Fraser |
| 3 | 20 | John Partchenko | OL | Michigan |
| 4 | 25 | Bret Anderson | SB | Simon Fraser |
| 4 | 27 | Martin Miller | DB | Manitoba |
| 5 | 35 | Jamie MacDonald | OT | Northern Illinois |
| 6 | 43 | Kelly Lochbaum | LB | Northern Arizona |

=== Ottawa Rough Riders Dispersal Draft ===
| Round | Pick | Player | Pos |
|---|---|---|---|
| 1 | 3 | Leonard Humphries | CB |
| 2 | 11 | Duane Arrindell | OL |
| 3 | 19 | Mike Gillock | DB |

== Preseason ==
| Week | Date | Opponent | Result | Record |
|---|---|---|---|---|
| A | June 8 | vs. Edmonton Eskimos | W 32–15 | 1–0 |
| B | June 17 | at Calgary Stampeders | L 18–30 | 1–1 |

== Regular season ==
=== Season standings ===
West Division
| Pos | Team | Pld | W | L | T | PF | PA | PD | Pts |
|---|---|---|---|---|---|---|---|---|---|
| 1 | Edmonton Eskimos (C, Q) | 18 | 12 | 6 | 0 | 479 | 400 | +79 | 24 |
| 2 | Calgary Stampeders (Q) | 18 | 10 | 8 | 0 | 522 | 442 | +80 | 20 |
| 3 | Saskatchewan Roughriders (Q) | 18 | 8 | 10 | 0 | 413 | 479 | −66 | 16 |
| 4 | BC Lions (Q) | 18 | 8 | 10 | 0 | 429 | 536 | −107 | 16 |

Source: "CFL.ca". Archived from the original on 2009-07-15.
(C) First round bye; (Q) Qualified for playoffs

=== Season schedule ===
| Week | Date | Opponent | Result | Record |
|---|---|---|---|---|
| 1 | June 26 | vs. Saskatchewan Roughriders | L 23–24 | 0–1 |
| 2 | July 3 | vs. Calgary Stampeders | W 17–16 | 1–1 |
| 3 | July 10 | at Edmonton Eskimos | W 41–31 | 2–1 |
| 4 | July 19 | vs. Winnipeg Blue Bombers | W 21–17 | 3–1 |
| 5 | July 24 | vs. Toronto Argonauts | L 20–34 | 3–2 |
| 6 | Aug 2 | at Hamilton Tiger-Cats | W 42–24 | 4–2 |
| 7 | Aug 9 | vs. Montreal Alouettes | L 31–45 | 4–3 |
| 8 | Aug 15 | at Saskatchewan Roughriders | W 39–26 | 5–3 |
| 9 | Aug 22 | vs. Calgary Stampeders | W 37–23 | 6–3 |
| 10 | Aug 30 | at Montreal Alouettes | L 24–33 | 6–4 |
| 11 | Sept 7 | at Saskatchewan Roughriders | L 12–46 | 6–5 |
| 12 | Sept 13 | vs. Edmonton Eskimos | W 27–1 | 7–5 |
| 13 | Sept 19 | at Winnipeg Blue Bombers | L 14–26 | 7–6 |
| 14 | Sept 26 | vs. Hamilton Tiger-Cats | W 34–33 | 8–6 |
| 15 | Oct 4 | at Toronto Argonauts | L 3–46 | 8–7 |
| 16 | Oct 10 | vs. Saskatchewan Roughriders | L 19–26 | 8–8 |
| 17 | Oct 19 | at Edmonton Eskimos | L 7–41 | 8–9 |
| 18 | Oct 26 | at Calgary Stampeders | L 9–43 | 8–10 |

== Roster ==
1997 BC Lions final roster
| Quarterbacks: 9 Damon Allen; 2 Giulio Caravatta K; Running backs: 6 Cory Philpot; 34 Brad Yamaoka; Receivers: 12 Bret Anderson K; 21 Jimmy Cunningham; 7 Alfred Jackson; 82 Nick Mazzoli; 86 Trevor Shaw; 77 Mike Trevathan | Offensive linemen: 65 Chuck Bradley T; 55 Doug Davies C/G; 64 Mo Elewonibi T; 59 Todd Furdyk T; 68 Cory Mantyka G; 60 Jamie Taras G; 53 Mike Withycombe C; Defensive linemen: 74 Dave Chaytors DT; 76 Joe Fleming DT; 72 Johnny Scott DE; 78 Harry Van Hofwegen DE; Special teams: 5 Lui Passaglia K/P | Linebackers: 95 Sheldon Benoit; 29 B. J. Gallis; 33 Kelly Lochbaum; 96 Virgil Robertson; Defensive backs: 10 Dave Donaldson; 40 Greg Frers; 14 Rashid Gayle; 22 John Holland; 24 Leonard Humphries; 11 Maurice Kelly; 4 Damion Lyons; 18 Frank Pimiskern; 20 Don Wilson | Injured list: 3 Daved Benefield LB; 7 Wayne Drinkwalter DT; 80 Andrew English SB; 97 Brooks Findlay LB; 90 Steve Glenn LB; 57 Mark Hatfield T/G; 13 Khari Jones QB; 31 David Maeva LB; 21 Martin Miller DB; 25 Sean Millington FB; 39 Nick Richards LB; 1 Al Shipman SB; 8 Andre Strode DB; 88 Larry Thompson WR; -- Chris Tsangaris LB; Italics indicate International player |

== Awards and records ==
- CFL's Most Outstanding Canadian Award – Sean Millington (FB)

=== 1997 CFL All-Stars ===
- WR – Alfred Jackson, CFL All-Star
- LB – Maurice Kelley, CFL All-Star

=== 1997 Intergold CFLPA All-Stars ===
- FB – Sean Millington, Intergold CFLPA All-Star
- WR – Alfred Jackson, Intergold CFLPA All-Star
- HC – Adam Rita, Intergold CFLPA All-Star

== Playoffs ==
=== East Semi-Final ===
| Team | Q1 | Q2 | Q3 | Q4 | Total |
|---|---|---|---|---|---|
| Montreal Alouettes | 21 | 21 | 3 | 0 | 45 |
| BC Lions | 2 | 10 | 16 | 7 | 35 |
