= 2000 CFL draft =

Canadian football draft

2000 CFL Draft

General information
- Sport: Canadian football
- Date: April 18
- Time: 11:00 AM EST

Overview
- 46 total selections in 6 rounds
- League: CFL
- First selection: Tyson St. James, LB; Saskatchewan Roughriders
- Most selections (7): Calgary Stampeders; Toronto Argonauts
- Fewest selections (4): BC Lions
- CIAU selections: 22
- NCAA selections: 23

The 2000 CFL draft took place on Tuesday, April 18, 2000. 46 players were chosen for Canadian Football League teams from among the 504 eligible CIAU football players from Canadian universities, as well as Canadian players playing in the NCAA. Of the 46 draft selections, 22 players were drafted from Canadian Interuniversity Athletics Union institutions.

== Trades ==
In the explanations below, (D) denotes trades that took place during the draft, while (PD) indicates trades completed pre-draft. This is a partial list due to references being limited.

=== Round one ===
- Montreal → Calgary (PD). Montreal traded a first-round selection and an undisclosed pick in the 2001 CFL draft to Calgary in exchange for Ed Philion.
- Hamilton → Calgary (PD). Hamilton traded a first-round selection to Calgary in a trade for Chris Burns.

=== Round four ===
- BC → Winnipeg (PD). BC traded a fourth-round selection and Khari Jones to Winnipeg in exchange for Chris Perez.
- Winnipeg → Toronto (D). Winnipeg traded the 24th overall selection and Brad Elberg to Toronto in exchange for Dave Mudge.

== Forfeitures ==
- Calgary forfeited their first round selection after selecting Wayne Blair in the 1999 Supplemental Draft.

== Draft order ==
=== Round one ===
| = CFL Division All-Star | = CFL All-Star | = Hall of Famer |

| Pick # | CFL team | Player | Position | School |
|---|---|---|---|---|
| 1 | Saskatchewan Roughriders | Tyson St. James | LB | British Columbia |
| 2 | Winnipeg Blue Bombers | Daaron McField | DL | British Columbia |
| 3 | Edmonton Eskimos | Tim Bakker | C | Western Ontario |
| 4 | Toronto Argonauts | Donnavan Carter | S | Northern Illinois |
| 5 | Calgary Stampeders (via Montreal) | Ibrahim Tounkara | SB | Ottawa |
| 6 | BC Lions | Adriano Belli | DE | Houston |
| – | Calgary Stampeders | Forfeit Pick | | |
| 7 | Calgary Stampeders (via Hamilton) | Scott Regimbald | TE | Houston |

=== Round two ===
| Pick # | CFL team | Player | Position | School |
|---|---|---|---|---|
| 8 | Saskatchewan Roughriders | Shawn Gallant | DB | Eastern Kentucky |
| 9 | Edmonton Eskimos (via Winnipeg) | Rob Harrod | WR | Ottawa |
| 10 | Edmonton Eskimos | Craig Carr | RB | Manitoba |
| 11 | Toronto Argonauts | Richard Clarke | WR | Weber State |
| 12 | Montreal Alouettes | Mat Petz | DE | Wake Forest |
| – | BC Lions | Forfeit Pick | | |
| 13 | Calgary Stampeders | Ryan Ward | OL | New Hampshire |
| 14 | Hamilton Tiger-Cats | Mike Juhasz | WR | North Dakota |

=== Round three ===
| = CFL Division All-Star | = CFL All-Star | = Hall of Famer |

| Pick # | CFL team | Player | Position | School |
|---|---|---|---|---|
| 15 | Saskatchewan Roughriders | Dylan Ching | WR | San Diego |
| 16 | Montreal Alouettes (via BC via Winnipeg) | Morgan Kane | RB | Wake Forest |
| 17 | Edmonton Eskimos | George Hudson | G | New Mexico State |
| 18 | Toronto Argonauts | Carson Souter | K | Montana State |
| 19 | Montreal Alouettes | Jason Gavadza | TE | Kent State |
| 20 | BC Lions | Brent Johnson | DL | Ohio State |
| 21 | Calgary Stampeders | Clinton Wayne | DE | Ohio State |
| 22 | Hamilton Tiger-Cats | Paul Lambert | G | Western Michigan |

=== Round four ===
| Pick # | CFL team | Player | Position | School |
|---|---|---|---|---|
| 23 | Saskatchewan Roughriders | Michael O'Brien | QB/P | Western Ontario |
| 24 | Toronto Argonauts (via Winnipeg) | Benoit Meloche | LB | Laval |
| 25 | Winnipeg Blue Bombers (via BC via Edmonton) | Markus Howell | WR | Texas Southern |
| 26 | Toronto Argonauts | Kojo Millington | DE | Wilfrid Laurier |
| 27 | Montreal Alouettes | Harvey Stables | WR | Wilfrid Laurier |
| 28 | BC Lions | Loren Padelford | OL | Guelph |
| 29 | Calgary Stampeders | Kent Ring | LB | Simon Fraser |
| 30 | Hamilton Tiger-Cats | Joe McCullum | OL | Utah |

=== Round five ===
| Pick # | CFL team | Player | Position | School |
|---|---|---|---|---|
| 31 | Saskatchewan Roughriders | Hudson Clark | TE | Western Ontario |
| 32 | Winnipeg Blue Bombers | Eric Schwab | DE | Wilfrid Laurier |
| 33 | Edmonton Eskimos | Rob Vickers | T | Wilfrid Laurier |
| 34 | Toronto Argonauts | Brad Coutts | WR | British Columbia |
| 35 | Montreal Alouettes | Ian Hewitt | K/P | Minot State |
| 36 | Winnipeg Blue Bombers (via BC) | Grant Everett | G | North Dakota |
| 37 | Calgary Stampeders | Paul Blenkhorn | OL | Western Ontario |
| 38 | Hamilton Tiger-Cats | James MacLean | SB | Queen's |

=== Round six ===
| Pick # | CFL team | Player | Position | School |
|---|---|---|---|---|
| 39 | Saskatchewan Roughriders | Jamie Forsythe | OL | Western Ontario |
| 40 | Winnipeg Blue Bombers | Matthew Sheridan | OL | Manitoba |
| 41 | Edmonton Eskimos | Yves Dossous | LB | Kent State |
| 42 | Toronto Argonauts | Jean-Vincent Posy-Audette | DB | Laval |
| 43 | Montreal Alouettes | Andre Clark | DB | SE Missouri State |
| 44 | BC Lions | Fabian Rayne | RB | Western Ontario |
| 45 | Calgary Stampeders | Brock Balog | DB | Calgary |
| 46 | Hamilton Tiger-Cats | Doug Van Moorsel | OL | California, PA |
