= 1997 Toronto Argonauts season =

CFL team season

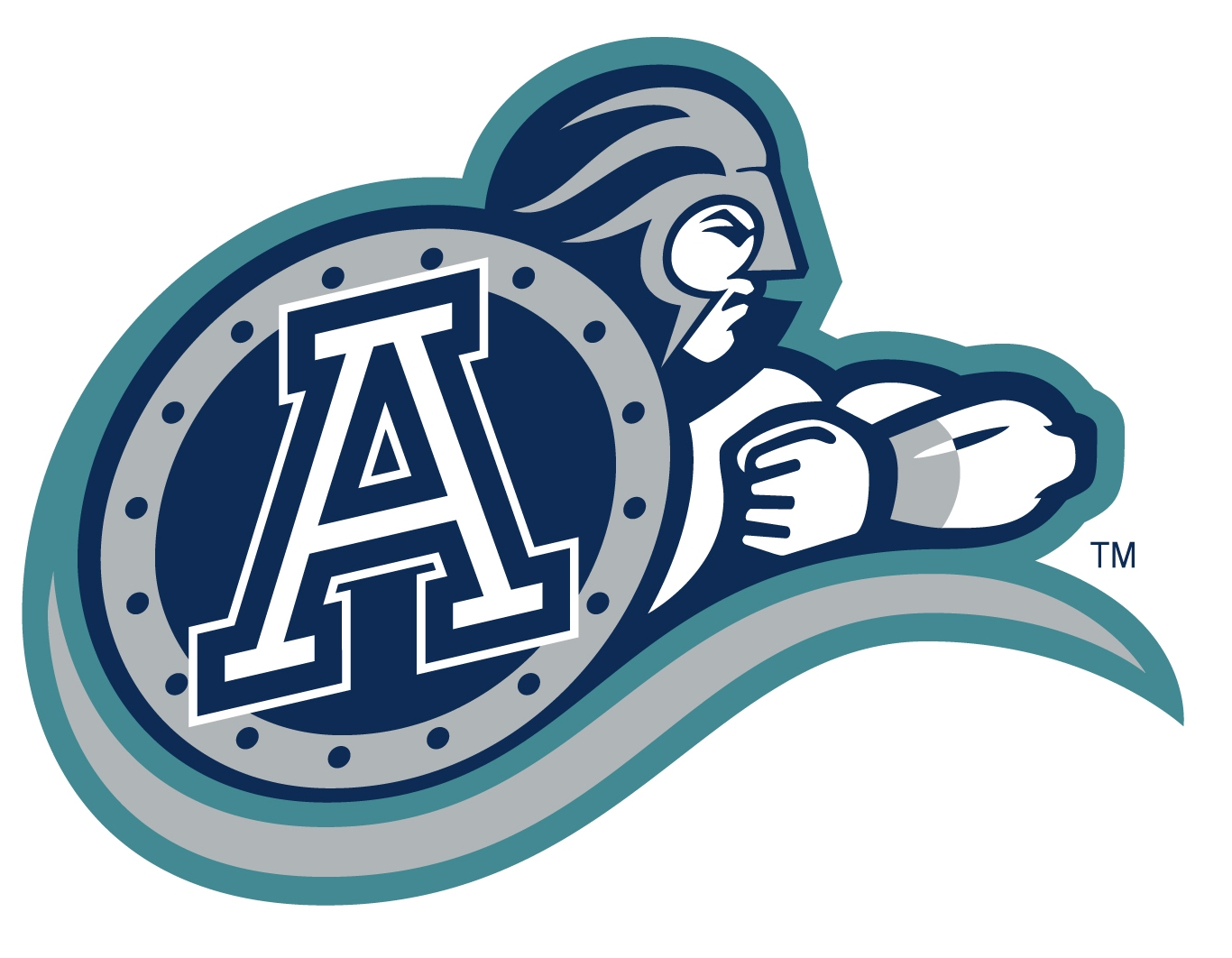
- General manager: Eric Tillman
- Head coach: Don Matthews
- Home stadium: SkyDome

Results
- Record: 15–3
- Division place: 1st, East
- Playoffs: Won Grey Cup

The 1997 Toronto Argonauts season was the 108th season for the team since the franchise's inception in 1873. The team finished in first place in the East Division with a 15–3 record and qualified for the playoffs for the second consecutive year. The defending champion Argonauts defeated the Montreal Alouettes in the Eastern Final and qualified for the 85th Grey Cup to defend their title. Toronto defeated the Saskatchewan Roughriders by a score of 47–23, winning their 14th Grey Cup championship, and repeated as Grey Cup champions.

== Offseason ==
=== CFL draft ===
Rd	Pick	Player	Position	School
1	1	Chad Folk	OL	Utah
1	9	Mathew DuBuc	SB	Texas Tech
2	17	Steve Salter	OL	Ottawa
3	18	Aldi Henry	CB	Michigan State
3	24	Dave Mudge	OT	Michigan State
4	33	Jayson Hansen	OL	Texas Tech
5	41	Mark Giardetti	DE	Evangel College
6	48	Kris Kershaw	QB	Salisbury State

=== Ottawa Rough Riders Dispersal Draft ===
Round	Pick	Player	Pos
1	9	Sammie Brennan	DB
2	17	Travis Anderson	WR
3	25	Joe Mero	CB

=== Preseason ===
Round	Date	Opponent	Results		Venue	Attendance
Round	Date	Opponent	Score	Record	Venue	Attendance
A	June 13	vs. Hamilton Tiger-Cats	W 18–14	1–0	SkyDome	13,452
B	June 18	at Montreal Alouettes	W 40–0	2–0	Olympic Stadium	6,394

== Regular season ==
=== Season standings ===
East Division
Pos	Team	Pld	W	L	T	PF	PA	PD	Pts
1	Toronto Argonauts (C, Q)	18	15	3	0	660	327	+333	30
2	Montreal Alouettes (Q)	18	13	5	0	509	532	−23	26
3	Winnipeg Blue Bombers	18	4	14	0	443	548	−105	8
4	Hamilton Tiger-Cats	18	2	16	0	362	549	−187	4

Source: "1997 Regular Season Standings". Canadian Football League. Archived from the original on 2008-10-29.
(C) First round bye; (Q) Qualified for playoffs

=== Regular season ===
Week	Date	Opponent	Results		Venue	Attendance
Week	Date	Opponent	Score	Record	Venue	Attendance
1	June 27	vs. Winnipeg Blue Bombers	W 38–23	1–0	SkyDome	16,551
2	July 6	at Hamilton Tiger-Cats	W 20–15	2–0	Ivor Wynne Stadium	14,033
3	July 12	at Saskatchewan Roughriders	L 23–27	2–1	Taylor Field	22,956
4	July 17	vs. Hamilton Tiger-Cats	W 27–20	3–1	SkyDome	17,222
5	July 24	at BC Lions	W 34–20	4–1	BC Place	23,330
6	July 31	vs. Montreal Alouettes	W 46–8	5–1	SkyDome	16,213
7	August 7	at Calgary Stampeders	L 35–45	5–2	McMahon Stadium	25,311
8	August 14	vs. Edmonton Eskimos	W 38–14	6–2	SkyDome	18,031
9	August 21	Saskatchewan Roughriders	W 27–1	7–2	SkyDome	17,330
10	September 1	at Hamilton Tiger-Cats	W 46–3	8–2	Ivor Wynne Stadium	18,377
11	September 7	at Winnipeg Blue Bombers	W 66–25	9–2	Winnipeg Stadium	21,080
12	September 14	vs. Hamilton Tiger-Cats	W 34–9	10–2	SkyDome	20,234
13	September 20	at Edmonton Eskimos	W 25–24	11–2	Commonwealth Stadium	38,619
14	September 28	at Winnipeg Blue Bombers	W 41–9	12–2	Winnipeg Stadium	20,004
15	October 4	vs. BC Lions	W 46–3	13–2	SkyDome	17,019
16	October 11	vs. Montreal Alouettes	W 28–21	14–2	SkyDome	17,355
17	October 18	vs. Calgary Stampeders	W 48–17	15–2	SkyDome	24,083
18	October 26	at Montreal Alouettes	L 38–43	15–3	Olympic Stadium	10,801

== Postseason ==
Round	Date	Opponent	Results		Venue	Attendance
Round	Date	Opponent	Score	Record	Venue	Attendance
East Final	Sun, Nov 9	vs. Montreal Alouettes	W 37–30	1–0	SkyDome	32,085
Grey Cup	Sun, Nov 16	vs. Saskatchewan Roughriders	W 47–23	2–0	Commonwealth Stadium	60,431

=== Grey Cup ===
Team	Q1	Q2	Q3	Q4	Total
Toronto Argonauts	7	13	21	6	47
Saskatchewan Roughriders	3	6	0	14	23

== Roster ==
1997 Toronto Argonauts final roster
Quarterbacks: 2 Doug Flutie; 11 Andre Ware; Running backs: 31 Michael Clemons; 29 Robert Drummond; 24 Matt DuBuc; Receivers: 80 Norm Casola; 28 Duane Dmytryshyn; 81 Andre Kirwan; 88 Paul Masotti; 87 Derrell Mitchell; 89 Denis Montana	Offensive linemen: 56 Chad Folk C; 58 Chris Gioskos G; 63 Mike Kiselak C; 54 Jeremy O'Day T; 57 Dan Payne G/T; 59 Pierre Vercheval G; 65 Willie Williams T; Defensive linemen: 51 Noah Cantor DT; 91 Demetrious Maxie DE/DT; 61 John Raposo DE; 73 Andrew Stewart DE; 92 Rob Waldrop DT	Linebackers: 37 Ken Benson; 38 Reggie Givens; 7 Johnnie Harris; 27 Eric Johnson; 50 Mike O'Shea; 35 Brendan Rogers; Defensive backs: 10 Antonious Bonner; 21 George Nimako; 9 Marcello Simmons; 12 Adrion Smith; 19 Donald Smith; 36 Les Smith; 26 Kelly Wiltshire	Special teams: 13 Mike Vanderjagt K/P; Injured list: 3 Charles Anthony DB; Italics indicate International player

== Awards and records ==
- Doug Flutie, Most Outstanding Player Award
- Mike Kiselak, Outstanding Offensive Lineman Award
- Derrell Mitchell, Outstanding Rookie Award

=== 1997 CFL All-Stars ===
- QB – Doug Flutie
- FB – Robert Drummond
- SB – Derrell Mitchell
- C – Mike Kiselak
- DT – Rob Waldrop
- DB – Johnnie Harris
- DS – Lester Smith
- P/K – Mike Vanderjagt
- ST – Mike "Pinball" Clemons
- WR – {Terrance Lawrence}
