= Darren Joseph =

Canadian football coach and former player

- Joseph with the Ottawa Gee-Gees in 2026

Ottawa Gee-Gees
- Position: Running backs coach

Personal information
- Born: August 29, 1968 (age 58); Ottawa, Ontario, Canada
- Listed height: 6 ft 0 in (1.83 m)
- Listed weight: 220 lb (100 kg)

Career information
- CJFL: Ottawa Sooners
- University: Ottawa

Career history
- 1992–1994: Ottawa Rough Riders
- 1995–1998: Saskatchewan Roughriders
- 1999–2000: Toronto Argonauts
- 2000: Montreal Alouettes
- 2001: Toronto Argonauts
- 2002–2003: Ottawa Renegades
- 2004: BC Lions

Awards and highlights
- CFL single game record for special teams tackles (7)

Darren Joseph (born August 29, 1968) is a Canadian former professional football running back and fullback who played from 1992 to 2004 in the Canadian Football League (CFL) with the Ottawa Rough Riders, Saskatchewan Roughriders, Toronto Argonauts, Montreal Alouettes, Ottawa Renegades and BC Lions. He is the running backs coach for the Ottawa Gee-Gees of U Sports football.

== Amateur career ==
He played in the Canadian Junior Football League for the Ottawa Sooners from 1988 to 1990 and then CIAU football for the Ottawa Gee-Gees from 1991 to 1992.

== Professional career ==
=== Ottawa Rough Riders ===
Joseph first signed with his hometown Ottawa Rough Riders in January 1992 and had 119 carries for 711 yards and two touchdowns in his rookie season. He also had 15 receptions for 113 yards and a 10-yard touchdown pass in 1992. His production fell in 1993 as he rushed for 398 yards on 108 attempts, but had a career high in receiving yards with 403 from 33 catches. In his last year with the Rough Riders, in 1994, he had 68 carries for 280 yards and 18 catches for 185 yards.

=== Saskatchewan Roughriders ===
On June 25, 1995, Joseph was traded to the Saskatchewan Roughriders in exchange for Chris Burns. He played for four seasons with the Roughriders and shifted more to fullback and special teams coverage as he had a career-high 19 special teams tackles in 1997. He also played in his first Grey Cup game that year where he had one special teams tackle, but the team lost the 85th Grey Cup to the Toronto Argonauts.

=== Toronto Argonauts ===
As a free agent, Joseph signed with the Toronto Argonauts on March 1, 1999. He played in 22 regular season games over two seasons with the Argonauts where he had 37 carries for 193 rushing yards and two touchdowns and 16 special teams tackles. He was released by the Argonauts on August 18, 2000.

=== Montreal Alouettes ===
Soon after his Toronto departure, Joseph was signed by the Montreal Alouettes on August 22, 2000. He played in nine regular season games for the team and had 11 special teams tackles.

=== Toronto Argonauts ===
Joseph re-signed with the Toronto Argonauts for the 2001 season and played in 17 regular season games where he had nine carries for 25 yards and a touchdown along with nine special teams tackles.

=== Ottawa Renegades ===
In 2002, Joseph joined the expansion Ottawa Renegades where he played in 11 regular season games and had four catches for 37 yards and a touchdown in addition to 11 special teams tackles. During the 2003 season, he matched a CFL record when he recorded seven special teams tackles in a single game on October 13, 2003.

=== BC Lions ===
Joseph signed with the BC Lions in 2004 and played in five regular season games where he had six special teams tackles. He also played in the 92nd Grey Cup where he recorded three special teams tackles, but the Lions lost the game to the Toronto Argonauts.

For his playing career, Joseph played in 175 regular season games and ran for 2,412 yards on 526 attempts, scoring 15 rushing touchdowns. He also caught 103 passes for 1,175 yards and four receiving touchdowns. While playing on special teams, he recorded 122 special teams tackles.

== Coaching career ==
After working as a police officer following his playing career, Joseph became the running backs coach for the Ottawa Gee-Gees in 2021. Joseph stepped aside for the 2022 season, but returned for the 2023 campaign.
