= 1997 CFL draft =

Canadian football draft

The 1997 CFL draft took place on Monday, April 7, 1997. 48 Canadian football players were chosen from 363 eligible Canadian universities as well as Canadian players playing in the NCAA.

The Ottawa Rough Riders folded following the 1996 CFL season, but any trades involving the club were still in effect. Since the Rough Riders finished last in the CFL, teams that received selections in trades picked first in those rounds, including the first overall pick. Conversely, the Hamilton Tiger-Cats traded their third round selection to the Rough Riders and that pick was subsequently forfeited. All other Ottawa selections were skipped.

== Forfeitures ==
- Hamilton forfeited their sixth round selection after making a selection in the 1996 Supplemental Draft.

== Round one ==
= CFL Division All-Star	= CFL All-Star	= Hall of Famer

Pick #	CFL team	Player	Position	School
1	Toronto Argonauts (via Ottawa)	Chad Folk	OL	Utah
2	Saskatchewan Roughriders	Ben Fairbrother	OL	Calgary
3	Edmonton Eskimos (via BC)	Ian Franklin	CB	Weber State
4	Hamilton Tiger-Cats	Tim Prinsen	OG	North Dakota
5	Calgary Stampeders (via Winnipeg)	Doug Brown	DL	Simon Fraser
6	Montreal Alouettes	Steve Charbonneau	DL	New Hampshire
7	Calgary Stampeders	Jason Clemett	LB	Simon Fraser
8	Edmonton Eskimos	Mark Farraway	DL	St. Francis Xavier
9	Toronto Argonauts	Matthew DuBuc	SB	Texas Tech

== Round two ==
Pick #	CFL team	Player	Position	School
10	BC Lions (via Winnipeg via Saskatchewan)	Robert Beveridge	OL	British Columbia
11	Montreal Alouettes (via BC)	Jerome Pathon	WR	Washington
12	Hamilton Tiger-Cats	Joe Rumolo	DL	Akron
13	Saskatchewan Roughriders (via BC via Winnipeg)	Chris Szarka	FB	Eastern Illinois
14	Montreal Alouettes	Ryan Coughlin	OL	McGill
15	Calgary Stampeders	Jeff Traversy	DT	Edinboro
16	Edmonton Eskimos	Patrice Denis	LB	Western Ontario
17	Toronto Argonauts	Steve Salter	OL	Ottawa

== Round three ==
= CFL Division All-Star	= CFL All-Star	= Hall of Famer

Pick #	CFL team	Player	Position	School
18	Toronto Argonauts (via Winnipeg via Saskatchewan)	Aldi Henry	CB	Michigan State
19	BC Lions	Paul Stoilen	LB	Simon Fraser
–	Ottawa Rough Riders (via Hamilton)	Team folded prior to season		
20	BC Lions (via Winnipeg)	John Partchenko	OT	Michigan
21	Montreal Alouettes	Bruno Heppell	RB	Western Michigan
22	Calgary Stampeders	Frank Rocca	OL	Eastern Michigan
23	Winnipeg Blue Bombers (via Edmonton)	Marice Henriques	S	Colorado
24	Toronto Argonauts	Dave Mudge	OT	Michigan State

== Round four ==
Pick #	CFL team	Player	Position	School
25	BC Lions (via Ottawa)	Bret Anderson	P	Simon Fraser
26	Saskatchewan Roughriders	Mark Raphael	CB	Ottawa
27	BC Lions	Martin Miller-Johnston	CB	Manitoba
28	Hamilton Tiger-Cats	Mark Nohra	RB	British Columbia
29	Montreal Alouettes (via Winnipeg)	Derek Krete	LB	Western Ontario
30	Montreal Alouettes	Ryan Carruthers	SB	Calgary
31	Calgary Stampeders	Uzo Ubani	SB	Concordia
32	Edmonton Eskimos	David Heasman	OL	Northern Arizona
33	Toronto Argonauts	Jayson Hansen	OL	Texas Tech

== Round five ==
Pick #	CFL team	Player	Position	School
34	Saskatchewan Roughriders	Andre Batson	WR	York
35	BC Lions	Jamie MacDonald	OT	Northern Illinois
36	Hamilton Tiger-Cats	Luc Normand	WR	Bishop's University
37	Winnipeg Blue Bombers	Jonathan Swift	LB	Tennessee-Martin
38	Montreal Alouettes	Andy Brereton	SB	Western Michigan
39	Calgary Stampeders	Trent Bagnail	OL	Saskatchewan
40	Edmonton Eskimos	O.J. Santiago	TE	Kent State
41	Toronto Argonauts	Mark Giardetti	DE	Evangel College

== Round six ==
= CFL Division All-Star	= CFL All-Star	= Hall of Famer

Pick #	CFL team	Player	Position	School
42	Saskatchewan Roughriders	Dan Comiskey	OL	Windsor
43	BC Lions	Kelly Lochbaum	LB	Northern Arizona
–	Hamilton Tiger-Cats	Forfeit Pick		
44	Winnipeg Blue Bombers	Wayne Weathers	DE	Manitoba
45	Montreal Alouettes	Francis Bellefroid	LB	Bishop's
46	Calgary Stampeders	Paul Donkersley	RB	Acadia
47	Edmonton Eskimos	Chris Hardy	QB	Manitoba
48	Toronto Argonauts	Kris Kershaw	QB	Salisbury State
