= 1997 CFL dispersal draft =

The 1997 CFL Dispersal draft took place on March 12, 1997, to distribute players who were under contract to the Ottawa Rough Riders at the time of their disbandment. The Saskatchewan Roughriders were awarded a bonus selection as well as the first selection in the first round. Otherwise the order of selection was determined based on priority waiver (reverse standings from 1996, with the 84th Grey Cup loser selecting second last and 84th Grey Cup winner selecting last in each round). Teams were permitted to trade selections, consequently, Winnipeg traded their first selection to Edmonton for Cody Ledbetter. 32 players were selected in the five-round draft, including 20 import players.

== Bonus pick ==
| Pick # | Player | Position | CFL team |
|---|---|---|---|
| 1 | David Archer | QB | Saskatchewan Roughriders |

== Round one ==
| Pick # | Player | Position | CFL team |
|---|---|---|---|
| 2 | Lamar McGriggs | LB | Saskatchewan Roughriders |
| 3 | Leonard Humphries | CB | BC Lions |
| 4 | Kenny Wilhite | CB | Hamilton Tiger-Cats |
| 5 | André Bolduc | SB | Edmonton Eskimos (via Winnipeg) |
| 6 | Uzooma Okeke | G | Montreal Alouettes |
| 7 | Joseph Rogers | WR | Calgary Stampeders |
| 8 | Robert Gordon | WR | Edmonton Eskimos |
| 9 | Sammie Brennan | DB | Toronto Argonauts |

== Round two ==
| Pick # | Player | Position | CFL team |
|---|---|---|---|
| 10 | Shawn Daniels | FB | Saskatchewan Roughriders |
| 11 | Duane Arrindell | OL | BC Lions |
| 12 | Orlondo Steinauer | S | Hamilton Tiger-Cats |
| 13 | Obrad Spanic | DL | Winnipeg Blue Bombers |
| 14 | Swift Burch | DT | Montreal Alouettes |
| 15 | Ray Bernard | LB | Calgary Stampeders |
| 16 | Tommy Henry | DB | Edmonton Eskimos |
| 17 | Travis Anderson | WR | Toronto Argonauts |

== Round three ==
| Pick # | Player | Position | CFL team |
|---|---|---|---|
| 18 | Dave Dinnall | RB | Saskatchewan Roughriders |
| 19 | Mike Gillock | DB | BC Lions |
| 20 | Frank West | DB | Hamilton Tiger-Cats |
| 21 | Stacy Evans | DE | Winnipeg Blue Bombers |
| 22 | Michael Hendricks | LB | Montreal Alouettes |
| 23 | Troy Mills | RB | Calgary Stampeders |
| 24 | Sean Reade | RB | Edmonton Eskimos |
| 25 | Joe Mero | CB | Toronto Argonauts |

== Round four ==
| Pick # | Player | Position | CFL team |
|---|---|---|---|
| 26 | Profall Grier | RB | Saskatchewan Roughriders |
| 27 | Pass | — | BC Lions |
| 28 | Jermaine Younger | LB | Hamilton Tiger-Cats |
| 29 | Lubo Zizakovic | DT | Winnipeg Blue Bombers |
| 30 | Robert Stevenson | G | Montreal Alouettes |
| 31 | Charles Esty | G | Calgary Stampeders |
| 32 | Pass | — | Edmonton Eskimos |
| 33 | Pass | — | Toronto Argonauts |

== Round five ==
| Pick # | Player | Position | CFL team |
|---|---|---|---|
| 34 | Pass | — | Saskatchewan Roughriders |
| 35 | Pass | — | BC Lions |
| 36 | Pass | — | Hamilton Tiger-Cats |
| 37 | Jayson Dzikowicz | DB | Winnipeg Blue Bombers |
| 38 | David Harper | LB | Montreal Alouettes |
| 39 | Pass | — | Calgary Stampeders |
| 40 | Pass | — | Edmonton Eskimos |
| 41 | Pass | — | Toronto Argonauts |
