= Jay Roberts (Canadian football) =

American gridiron football player (1942–2010)

Profile
- Position: Tight end

Personal information
- Born: October 20, 1942; Des Moines, Iowa, U.S.
- Died: October 6, 2010 (aged 67); Ottawa, Ontario, Canada
- Listed height: 6 ft 4 in (1.93 m)
- Listed weight: 220 lb (100 kg)

Career information
- College: Kansas

Career history
- 1964–1970: Ottawa Rough Riders

Awards and highlights
- 2× Grey Cup champion (1968, 1969)

Jay Roberts (October 20, 1942 – October 6, 2010) was a Canadian football player who played for the Ottawa Rough Riders. He won the Grey Cup in 1968 and 1969. He previously played college football at the University of Kansas. He was one of the last three sport lettermen at the University of Kansas where he played football, basketball and did the high jump in track. Roberts' brightest moment in a two-year hoops career at KU came when the 6-foot-4, 220-pounder's 12-foot jumper with three seconds left gave KU a 90–88, four-overtime victory over rival Kansas State in the finals of the 1962 Big Eight Holiday Tournament at Municipal Auditorium in Kansas City, Mo. In 2010, Roberts died of small cell lung cancer at the age of 67. He donated his brain and spinal cord to medical research and was the first CFL player ever to do so. Later research showed that Roberts' brain showed a presence of chronic traumatic encephalopathy (CTE), a disease linked to repeated sustenance to concussions. His son, Jed Roberts, also played in the CFL, for the Edmonton Eskimos.
