= Ibrahim Tounkara =

Canadian football player (born 1976)

No. 36, 2, 80, 82
- Positions: Wide receiver, Slotback

Personal information
- Born: April 23, 1976 (age 50); Montreal, Quebec, Canada
- Listed height: 6 ft 2 in (1.88 m)
- Listed weight: 210 lb (95 kg)

Career information
- University: Ottawa
- CFL draft: 2000: 1st round, 5th overall pick

Career history
- 2000–2003: Calgary Stampeders
- 2003–2005: Hamilton Tiger-Cats
- 2005–2006: Saskatchewan Roughriders

Awards and highlights
- Grey Cup champion (2001)
- Stats at CFL.ca

Ibrahim Tounkara (born April 23, 1976) is a Canadian former professional football wide receiver who played seven seasons in the Canadian Football League (CFL) with the Calgary Stampeders, Hamilton Tiger-Cats and Saskatchewan Roughriders. He was selected by the Stampeders with the fifth overall pick of the 2000 CFL draft after playing CIS football at the University of Ottawa.

== Early life ==
Ibrahim Tounkara was born on April 23, 1976, in Montreal, Quebec.

== Professional career ==
Tounkara was selected by the Calgary Stampeders with the fifth overall pick of the 2000 CFL draft and played in 54 games, starting three, for the team from 2000 to 2002. He played in the Stampeders' 89th Grey Cup 27–19 victory over the Winnipeg Blue Bombers on November 25, 2001. He was released by the Stampeders on June 14, 2003.

Tounkara signed with the Hamilton Tiger-Cats on July 23, 2003 and played in thirty games for the team from 2003 to 2004.

Tounkara was signed by the Saskatchewan Roughriders on March 14, 2005 and played in 33 games for the team from 2005 to 2006.

== Personal life ==
Tounkara's brother Ousmane also played in the CFL.
