= Scott Regimbald =

Canadian gridiron football player (born 1975)

No. 35, 21
- Position: Fullback

Personal information
- Born: November 25, 1975 (age 50); Montreal, Quebec, Canada
- Listed height: 6 ft 3 in (1.91 m)
- Listed weight: 245 lb (111 kg)

Career information
- High school: Champlain College Lennoxville (Sherbrooke, Quebec)
- College: Houston (1996–1999)
- CFL draft: 2000: 1st round, 7th overall pick

Career history
- Calgary Stampeders (2000–2004); Winnipeg Blue Bombers (2004–2006)

Awards and highlights
- Grey Cup champion (2001); C-USA All-Freshman Team (1996)

Career CFL statistics
- Games played: 126
- Rushing yards: 189
- Rushing touchdowns: 8
- Receptions: 65
- Receiving yards: 709
- Receiving touchdowns: 2
- Return yards: 34
- Stats at CFL.ca

Scott Regimbald (born November 23, 1975) is a Canadian former professional football fullback who played in the Canadian Football League (CFL) for the Calgary Stampeders and Winnipeg Blue Bombers. He played college football for the Houston Cougars.

== Early life ==
Regimbald was born on November 23, 1975, in Montreal, Quebec. He attended Champlain College Lennoxville in Sherbrooke, Quebec. On January 15, Regimbald committed to play college football at the University of Houston.

== College career ==
Regimbald played college football for the Houston Cougars from 1996 to 1999 and was a four-year letterman. He played at tight end for four seasons, recording 77 receptions for 897 yards and five touchdowns. In 1996, Regimbald was named to the C-USA All-Freshman team.

== Professional career ==
=== Calgary Stampeders ===
Regimbald was selected in the first round, with the seventh overall selection, by the Calgary Stampeders in the 2000 CFL draft. On May 9, he officially signed with the team. Regimbald played in 86 games for the Stampeders where he rushed for 99 yards, five touchdowns and had 50 catches for 544 yards and a receiving touchdown.

=== Winnipeg Blue Bombers ===
On September 25, 2004, Regimbald was traded to the Winnipeg Blue Bombers for Khari Jones and Randy Bowles, along with Joe Fleming and Wes Lysack. He played the remaining four games of the season, rushing five times for eight yards and two touchdowns. On December 10, Regimbald was re-signed by the Blue Bombers. He played two further seasons, where he had 82 rushing yards, 13 receptions for 135 yards and two total touchdowns. Regimbald became a free agent at the end of the 2006 CFL season.
