= Mat Petz =

American football player (born 1977)

No. 91, 8, 55
- Positions: Linebacker, defensive end

Personal information
- Born: June 25, 1977 (age 49); Windsor, Ontario, Canada
- Listed height: 6 ft 3 in (1.91 m)
- Listed weight: 250 lb (113 kg)

Career information
- College: Wake Forest
- CFL draft: 2000: 2nd round, 12th overall pick

Career history
- Montreal Alouettes (2000–2003); Hamilton Tiger-Cats (2004–2005)

Awards and highlights
- Grey Cup champion (2002)

Mat Petz (born June 25, 1977) is a Canadian former professional football linebacker who played in the Canadian Football League (CFL) with the Montreal Alouettes and Hamilton Tiger-Cats. He played college football at Wake Forest.

== Early life ==
Mat Petz was born on June 25, 1977, in Windsor, Ontario. Unlike most of his friends, Petz did not play hockey growing up as the equipment was too expense.

== College career ==
Petz was recruited by Wake Forest University to play college football for the Wake Forest Demon Deacons as a linebacker. He redshirted the 1996 season, and spent the 1997 season on special teams. Petz was a starter at defensive end in 1998, posting a team-leading 15 tackles for loss, including a team-leading six sacks. He did not play his junior year in 1999 after being declared academically ineligible.

== Professional career ==
Petz was selected by the Montreal Alouettes in the second round, with the 12th overall pick, of the 2000 CFL draft. He officially signed with the team on June 5. He was drafted as a defensive end but converted to linebacker during the 2000 season. He dressed in 51 games for the Alouettes from 2000 to 2003, totaling six tackles on defence, 46 special teams tackles, three forced fumbles, one fumble recovery, and three kick returns for 35 yards.

Petz became a free agent after the 2003 season. He declined a contract offer from Montreal and instead signed with the Hamilton Tiger-Cats in order to get more playing time on defence. He dressed in all 18 games for the first time in 2003, posting six tackles on defence, 14 special teams tackles, one sack, two forced fumbles, one fumble recovery, and one blocked punt that he also returned for a touchdown. Petz only dressed in nine games in 2005 due to a serious knee injury. He became a free agent after the 2005 season. In March 2006, Petz said that his knee was "feeling really good". However, he never signed with another CFL team.
