= Glen Scrivener =

Canadian football player (born 1967)

No. 60, 72, 75
- Position: Defensive tackle

Personal information
- Born: July 14, 1967 (age 59); Winnipeg, Manitoba, Canada
- Listed height: 6 ft 5 in (1.96 m)
- Listed weight: 290 lb (132 kg)

Career information
- College: William Jewell

Career history
- 1990–1991: Saskatchewan Roughriders
- 1992–1995: BC Lions
- 1996: Edmonton Eskimos
- 1997–1999: Winnipeg Blue Bombers
- 2000: Edmonton Eskimos
- 2001: Toronto Argonauts

Awards and highlights
- Grey Cup champion (1994); Tom Pate Memorial Award (1998)

Glen Scrivener (born July 14, 1967) is a Canadian former professional football defensive tackle who played in the Canadian Football League for 12 seasons. He played for five different teams from 1990 to 2001 while notably winning the Grey Cup with the BC Lions in 1994. He played college football at William Jewell College in Liberty, Missouri for the Cardinals.

== Professional career ==
Glen Scrivener was drafted in the first round by the Saskatchewan Roughriders with the third overall pick in the 1990 CFL draft. He was traded to the BC Lions in 1992, and played for the 1994 Lions club that won the 82nd Grey Cup. He had a chance for a second Grey Cup in 1996, during his first stint with the Edmonton Eskimos, but the team fell to Toronto in the 84th Grey Cup game.

In 1998, Scrivener was the recipient of the Tom Pate Memorial Award, awarded to the athlete who best represents Pate's legacy of commitment both to team and community. Scrivener, then playing for the Winnipeg Blue Bombers, became the first member of the club to receive the award. Among Scrivener's off-field contributions through the years has been participation in Allstars Baseball, a group of professional athletes and occasionally other celebrities who play benefit softball games for charities such as the Special Olympics and Variety Club.

Scrivener was one of the sources The Winnipeg Free Press quoted for a November 23, 2008, article on the rigours of professional football. The piece by Randy Turner, dubbed "The Killing Field: Pro football offers fame and glory, but the price is terrible," was prompted by the death at age 46 of former Blue Bombers offensive lineman Nick Benjamin. Scrivener noted he had undergone 18 orthopedic surgeries. Said Scrivener: "There are mornings when I get out of bed (and feel pain) and I'll say, 'Yeah, I remember that. That was B.C. Place. I remember getting hit by (former Lions offensive lineman) Jamie Taras when he shortened my neck. Or you've got turf toe on one foot so you can only wear certain types of shoes now. No more cowboy boots. There's constant reminders of when you used to play. Some of them are really positive, when people come up and say, 'Hey, I used to be a season-ticket holder and sat behind the bench. I thought I recognized you.' That's a good thing. But I can't remember the last time I ran because I wanted to."

== Retirement ==
Since retirement, Scrivener works in the propane business in Manitoba. He currently sits on the board of directors of both the Winnipeg Blue Bomber Alumni and Winnipeg Rifles Junior Football Club.

== Personal life ==
Scrivener's late father, Harvey Scrivener, was a Winnipeg Blue Bombers executive. Scrivener's brother, Colin, also played in the CFL and the pair were both members of the 1997 Winnipeg Blue Bombers.
