= Doug Berry =

Doug Berry may refer to:

- Doug Berry (Canadian football) (born 1948), American football coach
- Doug Berry (ice hockey) (born 1957), Canadian hockey player
- Doug Berry (politician) (1907–1957), Australian politician
- Douglas berry (Rubus ursinus), type of dewberry identified by David Douglas
