= Markus Howell =

Canadian gridiron football player and coach (born 1975)

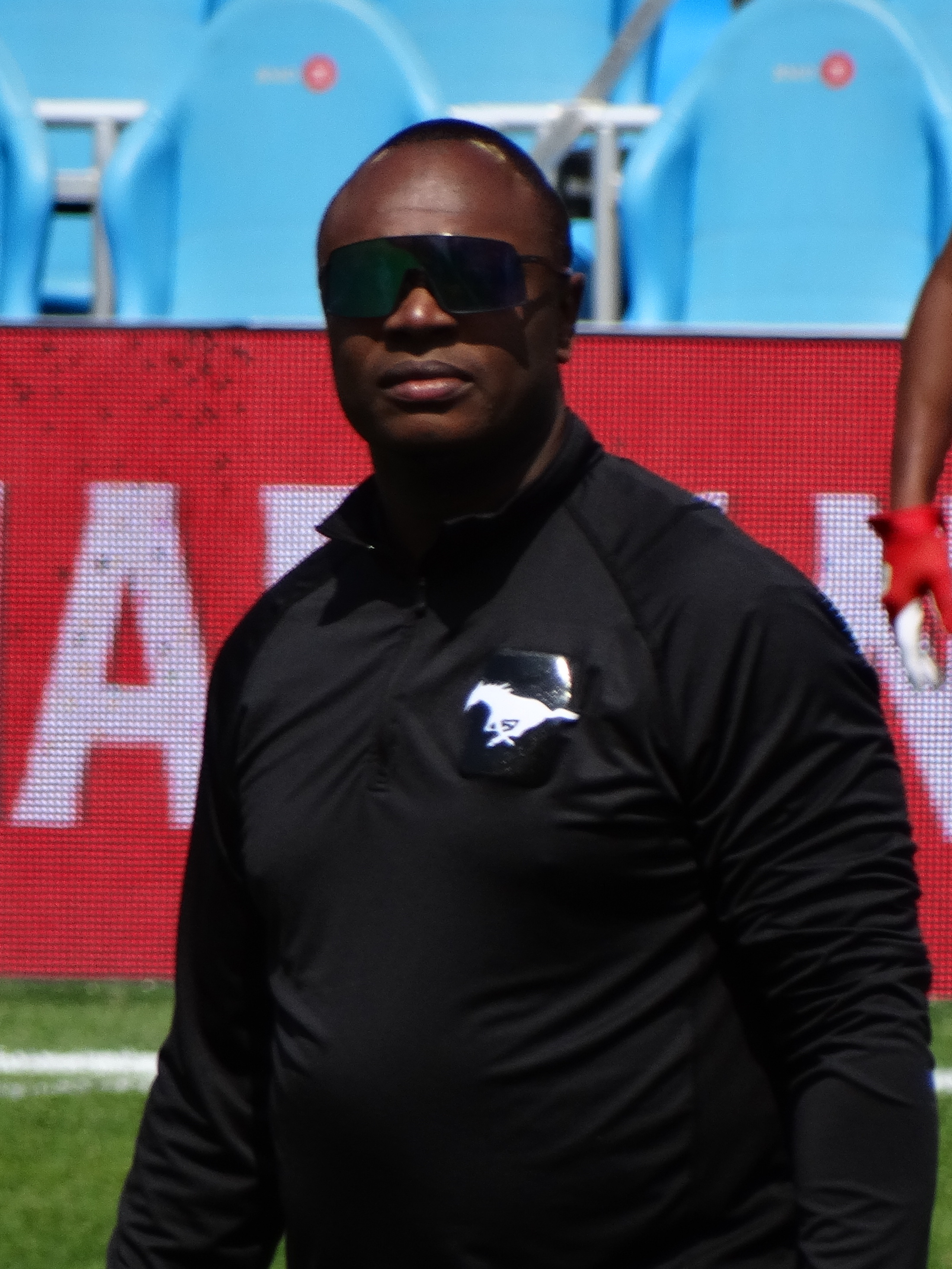
- Howell with the Calgary Stampeders in 2025

Calgary Stampeders
- Title: Receivers coach

Personal information
- Born: April 21, 1975 (age 51); Winnipeg, Manitoba, Canada
- Listed height: 5 ft 11 in (1.80 m)
- Listed weight: 185 lb (84 kg)

Career information
- Position: Wide receiver (No. 88)
- College: Texas Southern
- CFL draft: 2000: 4th round, 25th overall pick

Career history

Playing
- 2000–2004: Winnipeg Blue Bombers
- 2005: Ottawa Renegades
- 2006–2009: Calgary Stampeders
- 2010: Winnipeg Blue Bombers

Coaching
- 2011: Winnipeg Blue Bombers; Linebackers
- 2012–2015: Winnipeg Blue Bombers; Receivers
- 2016–2017: Saskatchewan Roughriders; Receivers
- 2018–2019: BC Lions; Pass Game Coordinator / Receivers
- 2020–2021: Toronto Argonauts; Pass Game Coordinator / Receivers
- 2022: Edmonton Elks; Run Game Coordinator / Receivers
- 2023–2024: Edmonton Elks; Pass Game Coordinator / Receivers
- 2025–present: Calgary Stampeders; Pass Game Coordinator / Receivers

Awards and highlights
- Grey Cup champion (2008)
- Stats at CFL.ca

Markus Howell (born April 21, 1975) is the receivers coach for the Calgary Stampeders of the Canadian Football League (CFL). He is a former professional Canadian football wide receiver and kick returner who played for 11 years for the Winnipeg Blue Bombers, Ottawa Renegades, and Stampeders. He was drafted in the fourth round of the 2000 CFL draft by the Blue Bombers. He won a Grey Cup championship in 2008. He played college football at Texas Southern.

== Professional career ==
=== Winnipeg Blue Bombers ===
Howell was drafted in the fourth round (25th overall) in the 2000 CFL draft by the Winnipeg Blue Bombers. As a rookie in 2000, Howell had 258 receiving yards and one touchdown. In 2001, he recorded 307 yards and a touchdown then in 2002 he had 415 yards and a touchdown. Howell had 20 catches for 282 yards and recorded the highest touchdown mark of his Winnipeg career with two. His final season in Winnipeg, he had two catches for 17 yards. He left as a free agent after the 2004 season.

=== Ottawa Renegades ===
The Ottawa Renegades signed Howell as a free agent in 2005. He played only one season in Ottawa, before they disbanded. In his only year there he had 25 catches for 417 yards with a career-high three touchdowns.

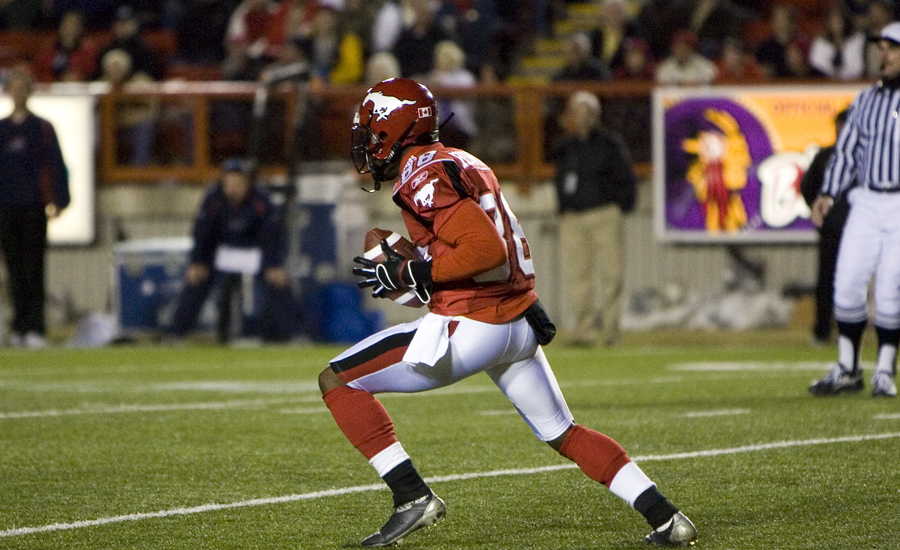
Howell catching a pass on October 27, 2007.

=== Calgary Stampeders ===
He was selected by the Calgary Stampeders in the CFL Dispersal Draft. In 2006, Howell recorded twenty catches for 340 yards and a touchdown. Howell played in 17 games in 2007, mainly playing on special teams with sporadic appearances on offence. He led Calgary in all-purpose yards with 1,299 and he returned 24 kickoffs for a combined total of 475 yards. Against Saskatchewan he returned a punt for 96 yards which was a season high. In 2008, Howell was used as a backup defensive back and also played on special teams. Against the Montreal Alouettes on July 10, he brought his career kickoff return yardage to over 1,500 yards. On August 2, he returned a punt against Saskatchewan which brought his career punt return yardage to over 1,500. Then, on October 13, once again against the Roughriders he played in his 150th career game.

Howell retired on May 10, 2010.

=== Winnipeg Blue Bombers ===
On July 12, 2010, it was announced that Howell had signed a contract with his former team, the Winnipeg Blue Bombers. After one season of play with the Bombers, Howell announced his second retirement on May 9, 2011.

== Coaching career ==
Soon after his retirement announcement, Howell joined the Blue Bombers coaching staff for the 2011 season.

On February 6, 2020, it was announced that Howell had joined the Toronto Argonauts as the team's receivers coach. The 2020 CFL season was cancelled, but Howell coached for the Argonauts in 2021 where the team finished in first place in the East Division.

On January 4, 2022, Howell formally joined the Edmonton Elks as the team's run game coordinator and receivers coach. He served in that role with the Elks for three seasons.

Howell was named the receivers coach for the Calgary Stampeders on December 16, 2024.
