= Donnavan Carter =

Canadian gridiron football player (born 1975)

Guelph Gryphons
- Title: Associated head coach and special teams coordinator

Personal information
- Born: April 20, 1975 (age 51); Toronto, Ontario, Canada
- Listed height: 6 ft 1 in (1.85 m)
- Listed weight: 220 lb (100 kg)

Career information
- Position: Linebacker
- College: Northern Illinois
- CFL draft: 2000: 1st round, 4th overall pick

Career history

Playing
- 2000–2001: Toronto Argonauts
- 2002–2003: Ottawa Renegades
- 2004–2005: Hamilton Tiger-Cats
- 2005: Ottawa Renegades
- 2006: Winnipeg Blue Bombers

Coaching
- 2011–2012: Toronto Varsity Blues (DC/DBC)
- 2013–2016: Windsor Lancers (DC/AHC)
- 2016: Guelph Gryphons Recruiting coordinator/Defensive backs coach)
- 2017–2018: Toronto Varsity Blues (Special teams coordinator/Linebackers coach)
- 2019–present: Guelph Gryphons (Special teams coordinator)

Awards and highlights
- 2× Second-team All-MAC (1998, 1999)
- Stats at CFL.ca (archive)

Donnavan Carter (born April 20, 1975) is a Canadian former professional football linebacker and safety and currently the special teams coordinator for the University of Guelph Gryphons. He played for seven seasons for the Toronto Argonauts, Ottawa Renegades, Hamilton Tiger-Cats, and Winnipeg Blue Bombers of the Canadian Football League. He was drafted fourth overall by the Argonauts in the 2000 CFL draft. He played college football for the Northern Illinois Huskies.
