= 1997 Hamilton Tiger-Cats season =

Season of Canadian Football League team the Hamilton Tiger-Cats

- Head coach: Don Sutherin; Urban Bowman (interim)
- Home stadium: Ivor Wynne Stadium

Results
- Record: 2–16
- Division place: 4th, East
- Playoffs: did not qualify
- Team MOP: Orlondo Steinauer
- Team MOC: Mike Philbrick
- Team MOR: Archie Amerson

The 1997 Hamilton Tiger-Cats season was the 40th season for the team in the Canadian Football League (CFL) and their 48th overall. The Tiger-Cats finished in fourth place in the East Division with a 2–16 record and failed to make the playoffs.

== Offseason ==
=== CFL draft ===
Rd	Pick	Player	Position	School
1	4	Tim Prinsen	OG	North Dakota
2	12	Joe Rumolo	DL	Akron
4	28	Mark Nohra	RB	British Columbia
5	36	Luc Normand	WR	Bishop's

=== Ottawa Rough Riders Dispersal Draft ===
Round	Pick	Player	Pos
1	4	Kenny Wilhite	CB
2	12	Orlondo Steinauer	S
3	20	Frank West	DB
4	27	Jermaine Younger	LB
5	31	Jayson Dzikowicz	DB

=== Preseason ===
Week	Date	Opponent	Results		Venue	Attendance
Week	Date	Opponent	Score	Record	Venue	Attendance
A	June 8	vs. Montreal Alouettes	L 14–30	0–1		
B	June 13	at Toronto Argonauts	L 14–18	0–2		

== Regular season ==
=== Season standings ===
East Division
Pos	Team	Pld	W	L	T	PF	PA	PD	Pts
1	Toronto Argonauts (C, Q)	18	15	3	0	660	327	+333	30
2	Montreal Alouettes (Q)	18	13	5	0	509	532	−23	26
3	Winnipeg Blue Bombers	18	4	14	0	443	548	−105	8
4	Hamilton Tiger-Cats	18	2	16	0	362	549	−187	4

Source: "1997 Regular Season Standings". Canadian Football League. Archived from the original on 2008-10-29.
(C) First round bye; (Q) Qualified for playoffs

=== Schedule ===
Week	Game	Date	Opponent	Results		Venue	Attendance
Week	Game	Date	Opponent	Score	Record	Venue	Attendance
1	1	June 27	at Montreal Alouettes	L 17–27	0–1		
2	2	July 6	vs. Toronto Argonauts	L 15–20	0–2		
3	3	July 11	vs. Winnipeg Blue Bombers	L 18–33	0–3		
4	4	July 17	at Toronto Argonauts	L 20–27	0–4		
5	5	July 25	at Winnipeg Blue Bombers	W 36–21	1–4		
6	6	Aug 2	vs. BC Lions	L 24–42	1–5		
7	7	Aug 8	vs. Saskatchewan Roughriders	L 20–30	1–6		
8	8	Aug 16	at Montreal Alouettes	L 26–36	1–7		
9	9	Aug 21	at Edmonton Eskimos	L 24–28	1–8		
10	10	Sept 1	vs. Toronto Argonauts	L 3–46	1–9		
11	11	Sept 6	vs. Montreal Alouettes	L 18–38	1–10		
12	12	Sept 14	at Toronto Argonauts	L 9–34	1–11		
13	13	Sept 21	vs. Calgary Stampeders	L 21–25	1–12		
14	14	Sept 26	at BC Lions	L 33–34	1–13		
15	15	Oct 5	vs. Winnipeg Blue Bombers	W 27–25	2–13		
16	16	Oct 13	at Calgary Stampeders	L 13–31	2–14		
17	17	Oct 19	at Saskatchewan Roughriders	L 19–22	2–15		
18	18	Oct 25	vs. Edmonton Eskimos	L 19–30	2–16		

== Roster ==
1997 Hamilton Tiger-Cats final roster
Quarterbacks: 10 Marquel Fleetwood; 11 Jason McCullough; Running backs: 9 Archie Amerson; 7 Willie Brown; 33 Yonel Jourdain; 29 Dean Noel; Receivers: 17 Ken Evraire; 89 Andrew Grigg; 18 Mike Morreale; 86 Ashaundai Smith; 4 Burt Thornton	Offensive linemen: 64 Joe Burgos T; 68 Tom Nütten C; 62 Tim Prinsen T/G; 65 Colin Quiney T; 66 Blaine Schmidt G; 57 Val St. Germain G; Defensive linemen: 90 Gonzalo Floyd DE; 55 Pat McNerney DT; 53 Joe Montford DE; 99 Mike Philbrick DT; 50 Joe Rumolo DT; 92 Willie Whitehead DE	Linebackers: 38 Cooper Harris; 45 Lamar McGriggs; 36 Justin Ring; 73 Calvin Tiggle; 27 Donovan Wright; Defensive backs: 37 Derek Grier; 42 Rob Hitchcock; 31 Sam Rogers; 22 Orlondo Steinauer; 39 Gerald Vaughn; 20 Kyle Walters; 28 Frank West	Special teams: 3 Paul Osbaldiston K/P; Injured list: 13 Anthony Calvillo QB; 98 Mike Campbell DT; 2 Eric Carter DB; 14 Mike Cawley QB; 12 Rickey Foggie QB; 25 Lee Knight FB; 51 David Richardson T; 32 Aaron Ruffin DB; 94 Obie Spanic DT; 61 Jude St. John T; 26 Kenny Wilhite DB; 82 Prince Wimbley SB; Italics indicate American players
