= Shawn Gallant =

Canadian football player (born 1976)

Profile
- Position: Defensive back

Personal information
- Born: October 14, 1976 (age 50); Windsor, Ontario
- Listed height: 6 ft 1 in (1.85 m)
- Listed weight: 210 lb (95 kg)

Career information
- College: Eastern Kentucky
- CFL draft: 2000: 2nd round, 8th overall pick

Career history
- 2000–2001: Saskatchewan Roughriders*
- 2002–2004: Ottawa Renegades
- 2005–2006: Winnipeg Blue Bombers
- 2007–2008: Montreal Alouettes
- 2009–2010: Winnipeg Blue Bombers
- * Offseason or practice squad member only
- Stats at CFL.ca

Shawn Gallant (born October 14, 1976) was a Canadian professional football defensive back for the Winnipeg Blue Bombers of the Canadian Football League.

== Career ==
He was drafted by the Saskatchewan Roughriders in the second round of the 2000 CFL draft. He played college football at Eastern Kentucky University.

In 2011, Gallant retired from professional football to join the Winnipeg Police Service. He is now working as a constable with the department.

Gallant has also played for the Ottawa Renegades and Montreal Alouettes.
