= LaDouphyous McCalla =

American gridiron football player (born 1976)

No. 31, 1, 22
- Position: Defensive back

Personal information
- Born: January 1, 1976 (age 50); Tyler, Texas, U.S.
- Listed height: 5 ft 8 in (1.73 m)
- Listed weight: 190 lb (86 kg)

Career information
- High school: John Tyler (Texas)
- College: Rice (1994–1998)

Career history
- 1999: Dallas Cowboys*
- 2000–2005: Saskatchewan Roughriders
- * Offseason or practice squad member only
- Stats at CFL.ca

LaDouphyous Santez McCalla (born January 1, 1976) is an American former professional football defensive back who played six seasons with the Saskatchewan Roughriders of the Canadian Football League (CFL). He played college football at Rice University.

== Early life and college ==
LaDouphyous Santez McCalla was born on January 1, 1976, in Tyler, Texas. He attended John Tyler High School in Tyler. He went by the last name of Shaw in high school.

McCalla played college football for the Rice Owls of Rice University. He was redshirted in 1994 and was a four-year letterman from 1995 to 1998. He recorded one interception for 39 yards in 1996 while also returning two punts for 26 yards. In 1997, McCalla returned five interceptions for 81 yards and 22 punts for 194 yards and one touchdown. As a senior in 1998, he returned four interceptions for 44 yards and 16 punts for 178 yards.

== Professional career ==
McCalla signed with the Dallas Cowboys in April 1999 after going undrafted in the 1999 NFL draft. He played in all four preseason games for the Cowboys but was cut before the start of the regular season.

McCalla was signed by the Saskatchewan Roughriders of the Canadian Football League on May 16, 2000. He started all 18 games for the Roughriders during his rookie year in 2000, recording 49 defensive tackles, four special teams tackles, one interception for 56 yards and a touchdown, and four pass breakups. The Roughriders finished the year with a 5–12–1 record. McCalla started all 18 games for the second consecutive season in 2001, totaling 42 defensive tackles, four special teams tackles, three interceptions, four pass breakups, and 16 punt returns for 217 yards. Saskatchewan finished the 2001 season with a 6–12 record. He dressed in all 18 games for the third straight year in 2002, accumulating 50 defensive tackles, two special teams tackles, eight pass breakups, and 12 punt returns for 200 yards. The Roughriders finished the year 8–10 and lost in the Eastern semifinal to the Toronto Argonauts by a score of 24–14. McCalla dressed in 16 games in 2003, recording 44 defensive tackles, three special teams tackles, one interception, four pass breakups, and 13 punt returns for 166 yards. Saskatchewan went 11–7 and lost in the Western final to the Edmonton Eskimos 30–23. He became a free agent after the 2003 season and re-signed with the team on January 14, 2004. He dressed in a career-low five games in 2004 due to suffering a season-ending knee injury. McCalla dressed in 16 games, all starts, during his final CFL season in 2005, totaling 37 defensive tackles, three special teams tackles, four interceptions, six pass breakups, one forced fumble, one fumble recovery that he returned 61 yards for a touchdown, and seven punt returns for 62 yards. In May 2006, McCalla announced that he would be retiring for at least one year for personal and family reasons. It was later revealed that he was staying at home to take care of his daughter, who was born prematurely. He also started a job as a nitrogen operator during this time. In March 2007, McCalled stated that he wanted to return to the Roughriders. However, in June 2007, it was reported that he had decided to stay retired.

== Personal life ==
On September 15, 1999, McCalla stated that in April 1996 he accidentally mailed a package of human bones to inmate Patrick Horn at the request of Patrick's brother, fellow inmate Keithan Horn. McCalla was friends with both of them in high school. McCalla picked up the package at the home of Keithan's stepfather, Jerry Whitaker, but did not know what was in it.

McCalla has 12 siblings.
