= Bruno Heppell =

Canadian football player (born 1972)

No. 30, 33
- Position: Fullback

Personal information
- Born: February 14, 1972 (age 54); La Prairie, Quebec, Canada
- Listed height: 6 ft 0 in (1.83 m)
- Listed weight: 215 lb (98 kg)

Career information
- CEGEP: Cégep du Vieux Montréal
- College: Western Michigan (1993–1996)
- CFL draft: 1997: 3rd round, 21st overall pick

Career history
- 1997–2004: Montreal Alouettes

Awards and highlights
- Grey Cup champion (2002); CFLPA Eastern All-Star (2002)

Career CFL statistics
- Rushes: 132
- Rushing yards: 485
- Receptions: 52
- Receiving yards: 770
- Total TDs: 15

Bruno Heppell (born February 14, 1972) is a Canadian former professional football fullback who played eight seasons with the Montreal Alouettes of the Canadian Football League (CFL). He was selected by the Alouettes in the third round of the 1997 CFL draft after playing college football at Western Michigan University.

== Early life ==
Bruno Heppell was born on February 14, 1972, in La Prairie, Quebec. He played CEGEP football at Cégep du Vieux Montréal. He set league records in 1992 after rushing for 1,457 yards and scoring 16 touchdowns. He was a two-time league MVP and the All-Star Recruiting Service named him the top running back in Canada.

== College career ==
He was a member of the Western Michigan Broncos of Western Michigan University from 1993 to 1996, and a three-year letterman from 1994 to 1996. He played in 11 games in 1994, rushing 27 times for 125 yards while catching eight passes for 70 yards. He recorded 133 carries for 699 yards and seven touchdowns, and 14 receptions for 134 yards in 1995. Heppell played in 11 games, starting ten, as a senior in 1996, rushing 160 times for 700 yards and four touchdowns and catching 20 passes for 223 yards.

== Professional career ==
Heppell was selected by the Montreal Alouettes in the third round, with the 21st overall pick, of the 1997 CFL draft. He mostly played on special teams during his rookie year in 1997, dressing in 13 games while recording 13 special teams tackles and one blocked punt that he returned for a touchdown. He missed the last five games of that year due to a wrist injury. He dressed in 14 games during the 1998 season as the backup to Michael Soles, totaling nine rushing attempts for 43 yards and one touchdown, two kick returns for 44 yards, one defensive tackle, and one special teams tackle. Heppell won the Alouettes Alumni Award in 1998, given to the player with the "most involvement in the community and on the field." He signed a three-year contract with the Alouettes during 1999 training camp. He dressed in 11 games in 1999 and posted ten special teams tackles before suffering a season-ending knee injury in game 11. He dressed in 17 games in 2000, accumulating 23 carries for 83 yards and one touchdown, ten receptions for 161 yards and one touchdown, one defensive tackle, and four special teams tackles. He left in the third quarter of game 14 due to internal bleeding. On November 26, 2000, the Alouettes lost the 88th Grey Cup to the BC Lions by a score of 28–26. Heppell started all 18 games for the Alouettes in 2001, recording 37 rushing attempts for 136 yards and three touchdowns, 22 catches for 273 yards and one touchdown, and two special teams tackles. The Alouettes finished the 2001 season with a 9–9 record. He dressed in 18 games for the second straight season in 2002, totaling 20 carries for 109 yards and one touchdown, nine catches for 196 yards, one defensive tackle, and one special teams tackle. He was named a CFLPA Eastern All-Star for his performance during the 2002 season. The Alouettes finished the year with a 13–5 record and advanced to the 90th Grey Cup, where they beat the Edmonton Eskimos by a score of 25–16. Heppell dressed in 18 games for the third consecutive season in 2003, recording 29 rushing attempts for 69 yards and four touchdowns, nine receptions for 122 yards and one touchdown, and four special teams tackles. On October 29, 2003, the Alouettes signed him to a new two-year contract with an option year. On November 16, 2003, the Alouettes lost 34–22 to the Eskimos in the 91st Grey Cup. He missed two games early in the 2004 season due to a knee injury and also missed the final five games due to a torn hamstring. Overall, he dressed in ten games during his final CFL season in 2004, accumulating 14 carries for 45 yards and one touchdown, two catches on three targets for 18 yards, and four special teams tackles. During the last two years of his CFL career, he had also suffered a sprained ankle, tendinitis, and a "chronic Achilles tendon condition". Due to these injuries, Heppell retired after the 2004 season. He was primarily a blocking fullback and special teams player during his CFL career.

== Personal life ==
During the CFL offseasons, Heppell played for the Montreal Alouettes' hockey team and worked as a meat salesman. After his CFL career, he became a football broadcaster in television and radio, including stints at RDS, Radio X-M, and Radio-Canada.

He also opened a youth football camp and served as a vice president of the Alouettes Alumni Association after his playing career.
