= Tyson St. James =

Canadian football player (born 1975)

Profile
- Position: Linebacker

Personal information
- Born: June 5, 1975 (age 51); Nanaimo, British Columbia, Canada
- Listed height: 6 ft 0 in (1.83 m)
- Listed weight: 240 lb (109 kg)

Career information
- College: British Columbia
- CFL draft: 2000: 1st round, 1st overall pick

Career history
- 2000–2002: Saskatchewan Roughriders
- 2003–2004: Winnipeg Blue Bombers

Awards and highlights
- J. P. Metras Trophy (1999)

Tyson St. James (born June 5, 1975) is a Canadian former professional football linebacker for the Saskatchewan Roughriders and Winnipeg Blue Bombers of the Canadian Football League. He was drafted first overall by the Roughriders in the 2000 CFL draft. He played CIS football for the UBC Thunderbirds.
