= Dave Harper (American football) =

American football player (1966–2021)

No. 50, 58
- Position: Linebacker

Personal information
- Born: May 5, 1966; Eureka, California, U.S.
- Died: October 20, 2021 (aged 55); Templeton, California, U.S.
- Listed height: 6 ft 2 in (1.88 m)
- Listed weight: 230 lb (104 kg)

Career information
- High school: Eureka
- College: Humboldt State
- NFL draft: 1990: 11th round, 277th overall pick

Career history
- Dallas Cowboys (1990); Sacramento Gold Miners (1994); San Antonio Texans (1995); Ottawa Rough Riders (1996); Montreal Alouettes (1997)*
- * Offseason or practice squad member only

Awards and highlights
- Third-team Division II All-American (1989); All-NCAC (1989); Second-team All-NCAC (1988); CFL Southern All-Star (1995)

Career NFL statistics
- Games played: 6
- Stats at Pro Football Reference

David Douglas Harper (May 5, 1966 – October 20, 2021), nicknamed "Harpdog", was an American professional football player who was a linebacker in the National Football League (NFL) and Canadian Football League (CFL). He played college football for the Humboldt State Lumberjacks. Harper played in NFL for the Dallas Cowboys before competing in the CFL with the Sacramento Gold Miners, San Antonio Texans and Ottawa Rough Riders.

== Early life ==
Harper attended Eureka High School where he played as a running back. He moved on to the College of the Redwoods, where he was named to the All-Golden Valley Conference team in 1986.

He accepted a football scholarship from Weber State University, but decided to transfer the same year to Division II Humboldt State University, sitting out the 1987 season because of transferring rules.

As a junior, he played both running back and linebacker. Against the University of California-Davis, he had a season-high 114 rushing yards, including a 44-yard run. Against Azusa Pacific University, he registered 20 tackles and one interception. He also averaged 23.5 yards on 4 kickoff returns.

As a senior, he was moved full-time to inside linebacker. He posted 125 tackles (school record), 7 tackles for loss (led the team) and 5 sacks (third on the team). He became the first player ever from the school to participate in the East–West Shrine Game.

In 1997, he was inducted into the Humboldt State Athletics Hall of Fame.

== Professional career ==
=== Dallas Cowboys ===
Harper was selected by the Dallas Cowboys in the 11th round (277th overall) of the 1990 NFL draft. He was waived on August 26. He was signed to the practice squad on October 1, he was released and signed again on 30. He was promoted to the active roster on November 14. He was released before the start of the 1991 season.

=== Saskatchewan Roughriders ===
In July 1992, he signed as a free agent with the Saskatchewan Roughriders of the Canadian Football League. He was limited with a pinched nerve during training camp and was released before the start of the season.

=== Sacramento Gold Miners / San Antonio Texans ===
On May 4, 1994, he was signed as a free agent by the Sacramento Gold Miners of the Canadian Football League, finishing with 6 defensive tackles and 8 special teams tackles in 10 games. In 1995, the franchise moved to San Antonio and was re-named as the Texans. He recorded 74 tackles (5 for loss) and 7 sacks, while being named to the Southern All-Sar team. The franchise folded in February 1996.

=== Ottawa Rough Riders ===
On August 2, 1996, he signed as a free agent with the Ottawa Rough Riders of the Canadian Football League. He only appeared in 2 games. The franchise folded in November 1996.

=== Montreal Alouettes ===
In 1997, he was selected in the fifth round of the dispersal draft by the Montreal Alouettes. He was released before the start of the season.

== Personal life ==
After his professional career, he was the athletic director, head football coach and a physical education teacher at Templeton High School. He is also known as Harpdog to his students and co-workers at Templeton High School.

Harper died on October 20, 2021, due to complications from COVID-19. He was 55.
