= Bob Beveridge =

English cricketer

Robert Beveridge (16 September 1909 – 5 March 1998) was an English first-class cricketer active 1930–34 who played for Middlesex. He was born in Paddington; died in Auckland. After emigrating to New Zealand, he was groundsman at Eden Park in the 1960s and 1970s.
