= Ryan Coughlin =

Canadian football player (born 1973)

No. 69, 67
- Positions: Offensive lineman, long snapper

Personal information
- Born: April 4, 1973 (age 53); Renfrew, Ontario, Canada
- Listed height: 6 ft 6 in (1.98 m)
- Listed weight: 295 lb (134 kg)

Career information
- University: McGill (1992–1996)
- CFL draft: 1997: 2nd round, 14th overall pick

Career history
- 1997–1999: Montreal Alouettes

Ryan Coughlin (born April 4, 1973) is a Canadian former professional football offensive lineman who played three seasons with the Montreal Alouettes of the Canadian Football League (CFL). He was selected by the Alouettes in the second round of the 1997 CFL draft after playing CIS football for the McGill Redmen of McGill University.

== Early life ==
Ryan Coughlin was born on April 4, 1973, in Renfrew, Ontario. He played hockey for the Nepean Raiders of the Central Junior A Hockey League (CJHL), appearing in 53 games during the 1988–1989 season and 34 games during the 1989–1990 season. He was selected in the fourth round, with the 59th overall pick, of the 1990 OHL draft by the Hamilton Dukes. Coughlin played in nine games for the Kanata Valley Lasers of the CJHL during the 1991–92 season.

Coughlin was a member the McGill Redmen football team of McGill University from 1992 to 1996. He started 25 of 26 games for the Redmen during his final three seasons. Coughlin also played hockey during his freshman year at McGill, appearing in nine games while recording an assist and a goal (which was a game-winner).

== Professional career ==
Coughlin was selected by the Montreal Alouettes in the second round, with the 14th overall pick, of the 1997 CFL draft. He dressed in 17 games for the Alouettes during his rookie year in 1997, recording three special teams tackles and one fumble recovery. He dressed in 17 games for the second consecutive season in 1998, and posted three special teams again as well. Coughlin dressed in 14 games during the 1999 season, and made one special teams tackles. He also spent time at long snapper during his time with the Alouettes. Going into 2000 season, Coughlin was lined up for a starting position due to the retirement of Neal Fort. However, Coughlin unexpectedly announced his retirement as well on June 11, 2000, stating "This (playing football) isn't what I want to do. My heart isn't in it. It's a bad way to leave, but for me, this is the easiest way to do it."

== Personal life ==
Coughlin taught high school science and physical education during the CFL off-seasons.
