= 1997 Edmonton Eskimos season =

Canadian football team season

- General manager: Hugh Campbell
- Head coach: Ron Lancaster
- Home stadium: Commonwealth Stadium

Results
- Record: 12–6
- Division place: 1st, West
- Playoffs: Lost West Final

The 1997 Edmonton Eskimos, coached by Ron Lancaster, finished in first place in the West Division with a 12–6 record. They were upset in the West Final by the Saskatchewan Roughriders.

== Offseason ==
=== CFL draft ===
Round	Pick	Player	Position	School
1	3 (via Ottawa)	Chad Folk	OL	Utah
1	8	Mark Farraway	DL	St. Francis Xavier
2	16	Patrice Denis	LB	Western Ontario
4	32	David Heasman	OL	Northern Arizona
5	40	O.J. Santiago	TE	Kent State
6	47	Chris Hardy	QB	Manitoba

=== Ottawa Roughriders Dispersal Draft ===
Round	Pick	Player	Pos
1	5 (via Winnipeg)	André Bolduc	SB
1	8	Robert Gordon	WR
2	16	Tommy Henry	DB
3	24	Sean Reade	RB

== Preseason ==
=== Schedule ===
Week	Date	Opponent	Score	Result	Attendance	Record
A	June 8	@. British Columbia Lions	32–15	L	10284	0–1
B	June 19	vs Saskatchewan Roughriders	18–17	W	32291	1–1

== Regular season ==
=== Season standings ===
West Division
Pos	Team	Pld	W	L	T	PF	PA	PD	Pts
1	Edmonton Eskimos (C, Q)	18	12	6	0	479	400	+79	24
2	Calgary Stampeders (Q)	18	10	8	0	522	442	+80	20
3	Saskatchewan Roughriders (Q)	18	8	10	0	413	479	−66	16
4	BC Lions (Q)	18	8	10	0	429	536	−107	16

Source: "CFL.ca". Archived from the original on 2009-07-15.
(C) First round bye; (Q) Qualified for playoffs

=== Season schedule ===
Week	Date	Opponent	Score	Result	Attendance	Record	Stk
1	June 25	@ Calgary Stampeders	23–22	W	24868	1–0	W1
2	July 4	@ Saskatchewan Roughriders	24–18	W	25751	2–0	W2
3	July 10	vs. British Columbia Lions	41–31	L	26010	2–1	L1
4	July 17	vs. Montreal Alouettes	32–0	W	27811	3–1	W1
5	July 24	@ Montreal Alouettes	34–24	W	10225	4–1	W2
6	July 31	vs. Saskatchewan Roughriders	37–34	W	30917	5–1	W3
7	August 7	vs. Winnipeg Blue Bombers	45–11	W	29293	6–1	W4
8	August 14	@ Toronto Argonauts	38–14	L	18031	6–2	L1
9	August 21	vs. Hamilton Tiger Cats	28–24	W	26960	7–2	W1
10	September 1	@ Calgary Stampeders	27–14	L	37611	7–3	L1
11	September 5	vs. Calgary Stampeders	24–20	W	43913	8–3	W1
12	September 13	@ British Columbia	27–1	L	25088	8–4	L1
13	September 20	vs. Toronto Argonauts	25–24	L	38619	8–5	L2
14	September 28	@ Saskatchewan Roughriders	29–15	L	29361	8–6	L3
15	October 5	vs. Calgary Stampeders	42–32 (OT)	W	31572	9–6	W1
16	October 12	@ Winnipeg Blue Bombers	20–2	W	18524	10–6	W2
17	October 19	vs. British Columbia Lions	41–7	W	31958	11–6	W3
18	October 25	@ Hamilton Tiger Catse	30–19	W	16110	12–6	W4

=== Offence ===
- SB – Darren Flutie, Edmonton Eskimos

=== Defence ===
- LB – Willie Pless, Edmonton Eskimos
- CB – Kavis Reed, Edmonton Eskimos
- DB – Glenn Rogers Jr., Edmonton Eskimos

=== Offence ===
- SB – Darren Flutie, Edmonton Eskimos
- OG – Leo Groenewegen, Edmonton Eskimos
- OT – Thomas Rayam, Edmonton Eskimos

=== Defence ===
- DT – Bennie Goods, Edmonton Eskimos
- DE – Malvin Hunter, Edmonton Eskimos
- LB – Willie Pless, Edmonton Eskimos
- CB – Kavis Reed, Edmonton Eskimos
- DB – Glenn Rogers Jr., Edmonton Eskimos
- DS – Trent Brown, Edmonton Eskimos

=== Special teams ===
- ST – Gizmo Williams, Edmonton Eskimos

== Playoffs ==
=== West Final ===
Team	Q1	Q2	Q3	Q4	Total
Saskatchewan Roughriders	14	10	0	7	31
Edmonton Eskimos	7	8	1	14	30

== Roster ==
1997 Edmonton Eskimos final roster
Quarterbacks: 15 Jimmy Kemp; 14 Danny McManus; Running backs: 35 Eric Blount; 34 Tony Burse; 29 Jay Hamilton; Receivers: 20 Don Blair; 4 Eddie Brown; 82 Darren Flutie; 84 Bob Gordon; 31 Marc Tobert; 2 Gizmo Williams	Offensive linemen: 67 Rod Connop C; 51 Mark Farraway G/C; 59 Leo Groenewegen G; 60 Chris Morris T; 55 Tom Rayam T; 62 Derek Sholdice G; 63 Vic Stevenson T; Defensive linemen: 89 Leroy Blugh DE; 40 Bennie Goods DT; 46 Malvin Hunter DE; 79 Derek MacCready DT; 43 Jed Roberts DE/DT	Linebackers: 37 Patrice Denis; 36 Bruce Dickson; 38 Errol Martin; 45 Maurice Miller; 39 Willie Pless; Defensive backs: 17 Derrick Beatty; 28 Trent Brown; 10 Malcolm Frank; 7 Ian Franklin; 13 Tommy Henry; 24 Kavis Reed; 26 Glenn Rogers	Special teams: 3 Sean Fleming K/P; Injured list: 12 André Bolduc SB; 9 Marcus Crandell QB; 88 Shannon Myers WR; 6 Reggie Pleasant DB; 33 Mike Sellers FB/DE; Italics indicate American player
