= George Hudson (Canadian football) =

Canadian gridiron football player (born 1976)

Profile
- Position: Center

Personal information
- Born: November 10, 1976 (age 49); St. Catharines, Ontario, Canada
- Listed height: 6 ft 4 in (1.93 m)
- Listed weight: 310 lb (141 kg)

Career information
- High school: Beamsville
- College: New Mexico State
- CFL draft: 2000: 3rd round, 17th overall pick

Career history
- 2000: Dallas Cowboys*
- 2000: Edmonton Eskimos
- 2001: Carolina Panthers*
- 2001: Edmonton Eskimos
- 2002–2005: Ottawa Renegades
- 2006–2010: Hamilton Tiger-Cats
- 2011: Saskatchewan Roughriders
- * Offseason or practice squad member only
- Stats at CFL.ca

George Hudson (born November 10, 1976) is a Canadian former professional football centre who played in the Canadian Football League (CFL). He was selected by the Edmonton Eskimos in the third round of the 2000 CFL draft. He played college football for the New Mexico State Aggies.

Hudson was a member of the Dallas Cowboys, Edmonton Eskimos, Carolina Panthers, Ottawa Renegades, Hamilton Tiger-Cats, and Saskatchewan Roughriders.
