= Tommy Henry (gridiron football) =

American gridiron football player (born 1969)

No. 6
- Position: Defensive back

Personal information
- Born: November 4, 1969 (age 57); Arcadia, Florida, U.S.
- Listed height: 6 ft 0 in (1.83 m)
- Listed weight: 200 lb (91 kg)

Career information
- College: Florida State

Career history
- Sacramento Gold Miners (1993); Toronto Argonauts (1994–1995); Ottawa Rough Riders (1996); Edmonton Eskimos (1997–1998); Saskatchewan Roughriders (1998); Tampa Bay Storm (1999–2001); Hamilton Tiger-Cats (1999); Toronto Phantoms (2001–2002); Orlando Predators (2002)

Awards and highlights
- Grey Cup champion (1999); Second -team All-Arena (2000); AFL All-Rookie Team (1999)

Career CFL statistics
- Tackles: 235
- Interceptions: 19
- Sacks: 3

Career AFL statistics
- Tackles: 207
- Pass breakups: 93
- Interceptions: 7
- Forced fumbles: 5
- Stats at ArenaFan.com

Thomas Henry (born November 4, 1969) is an American former professional football defensive back who played six seasons in the Canadian Football League (CFL) with the Sacramento Gold Miners, Toronto Argonauts, Ottawa Rough Riders, Edmonton Eskimos, Saskatchewan Roughriders and Hamilton Tiger-Cats. He played college football at Florida State University. He was also a member of the Tampa Bay Storm, Toronto Phantoms and Orlando Predators of the Arena Football League (AFL).

== Professional career ==
Henry played in the CFL for the Sacramento Gold Miners in 1993, the Toronto Argonauts from 1994 to 1995, the Ottawa Rough Riders in 1996, the Edmonton Eskimos from 1997 to 1998, and the Saskatchewan Roughriders in 1998.

Henry played for the Tampa Bay Storm from 1999 to 2001, earning second-team All-Arena honors in 2000 and being named to the AFL All-Rookie Team in 1999.

Henry signed with the Hamilton Tiger-Cats of the CFL in September 1999. The Tiger-Cats won the 87th Grey Cup against the Calgary Stampeders on November 28, 1999.

Henry was traded to the Toronto Phantoms from the Tampa Bay Storm on November 12, 2001. He was released by the Phantoms on May 14, 2002.

Henry signed with the AFL's Orlando Predators on May 22, 2002. He was released by the Predators on July 9, 2002.
