= Hudson Clark =

American football player (born 2001)

Profile
- Position: Safety

Personal information
- Born: February 17, 2001 (age 25); Dallas, Texas, U.S.
- Listed height: 6 ft 1 in (1.85 m)
- Listed weight: 189 lb (86 kg)

Career information
- High school: Highland Park (University Park, Texas)
- College: Arkansas (2019–2024)
- NFL draft: 2025: undrafted

Career history
- Las Vegas Raiders (2025)*; Birmingham Stallions (2026); Tennessee Titans (2026)*; Arizona Cardinals (2026)*
- * Offseason or practice squad member only

Hudson Clark (born February 17, 2001) is an American professional football safety. He played college football for the Arkansas Razorbacks and was signed by the Las Vegas Raiders as an undrafted free agent in 2025. Clark has also played for the Birmingham Stallions of the United Football League (UFL).

== Early life ==
Clark attended Highland Park High School in University Park, Texas. As a senior, he tallied 40 tackles with three being for a loss, and nine interceptions. Clark was a 3 time Texas State Champion, Team Captain, and named First Team All State. Coming out of high school, Clark decided to walk-on to play for the Arkansas Razorbacks over SMU, OU, and Texas

== College career ==
In week 8 of the 2020 season, Clark had five tackles and three interceptions in a win over Ole Miss, earning Southeastern Conference (SEC) freshman of the week honors. For his performance, he was put on scholarship by the Razorbacks. Clark finished his freshman season with 47 tackles with one going for a loss, three pass deflections, and three interceptions. During the 2021 season, he recorded 22 tackles, with one being for a loss, and one pass deflection. In week 8 of the 2022 season, Clark tallied 11 tackles, an interception, and a fumble recovery in a win over BYU en route to being named the SEC defensive player of the week. In the 2022 season, he totaled 67 tackles, with four being for a loss, 11 pass deflections, an interception, two fumble recoveries, and two forced fumbles. In the 2023 season opener versus Western Carolina, Clark recorded an interception in a blowout win. He finished the 2023 season tallying 51 tackles with four and a half going for a loss, half a sack, four pass deflections, an interception, and a fumble recovery. Clark was named First Team All SEC, Team Captain, and First Team All American. Clark was awarded the Jim Thorpe MVP of the week at Safety and the Jim Thorpe MVP of the week at Corner Back. One of the only players in the modern era to start at 5 different defensive positions in the SEC. Honors graduate, Magna Cum Laude, MBA Walton Business School Finance, . A 5 year Arkansas Football Letterman, an accomplishment only achieved by .5% of all athletes since 1894.

== Professional career ==
Pre-draft measurables
Height	Weight	Arm length	Hand span	Wingspan	40-yard dash	10-yard split	20-yard split	20-yard shuttle	Three-cone drill	Vertical jump	Broad jump	Bench press
6 ft 0 7/8 in (1.85 m)	194 lb (88 kg)	30 7/8 in (0.78 m)	8 7/8 in (0.23 m)	6 ft 3 1/8 in (1.91 m)	4.59 s	1.56 s	2.62 s	4.22 s	6.84 s	38.5 in (0.98 m)	9 ft 10 in (3.00 m)	13 reps
All values from Pro Day

=== Las Vegas Raiders ===
On May 9, 2025, Clark signed with the Las Vegas Raiders as an undrafted free agent after going unselected in the 2025 NFL draft. He was waived on August 25.

=== Birmingham Stallions ===
On January 14, 2026, Clark was selected by the Birmingham Stallions of the United Football League (UFL).

=== Tennessee Titans ===
On July 30, 2026, Clark was signed by the Tennessee Titans. He was waived by the Titans on August 2.

=== Arizona Cardinals ===
On August 24, 2026, Clark was signed by the Arizona Cardinals. Clark was waived by the Cardinals as a part of final roster cuts on August 30.
