= Jed Roberts =

Canadian gridiron football player (born 1967)

Profile
- Positions: Defensive end, Linebacker

Personal information
- Born: November 10, 1967 (age 58); Ottawa, Ontario, Canada
- Listed height: 6 ft 2 in (1.88 m)
- Listed weight: 265 lb (120 kg)

Career information
- College: University of Northern Colorado

Career history
- 1990–2002: Edmonton Eskimos

Awards and highlights
- Grey Cup champion (1993)

Jed Roberts (born November 10, 1967) is a former Canadian Football League defensive end and linebacker who played thirteen seasons for the Edmonton Eskimos. His father was Jay Roberts, a former tight end with the Ottawa Rough Riders.

== Highlights ==
- First Team All North Central Conference Linebacker in 1989.
- Voted to the University of Northern Colorado 50-Year Football Dream Team in 2002.
- Recorded ten quarterback sacks in the 1993 season with the Eskimos.
- Set the Edmonton Eskimos single game record for most special teams tackles in a playoff game with four in 1999.
- Roberts set the Eskimos franchise record for most special teams tackles in a game with five against the BC Lions in 2000.
- Holds the Eskimos franchise record for most special teams in a career with 163.
- Roberts finished his CFL career tied for fourth place (with former Toronto Argonaut linebacker Michael O'Shea) for most special teams tackles in the Canadian Football League's history.
- Tom Pate Nominee in 2000.
- In September 2024, Roberts was inducted into the University of Northern Colorado Athletics Hall of Fame for his achievements in football.
