= Shawn Daniels (Canadian football) =

Canadian gridiron football player (born 1966)

No. 33, 34, 38, 35
- Position: Fullback

Personal information
- Born: September 3, 1966 (age 60); Montreal, Quebec, Canada
- Listed height: 5 ft 11 in (1.80 m)
- Listed weight: 240 lb (109 kg)

Career information
- College: Snow (1985–1986); Bowling Green (1987–1988)
- CFL draft: 1988: 3rd round, 19th overall pick

Career history
- 1989: Dallas Cowboys*
- 1989: Saskatchewan Roughriders
- 1990–1993: Ottawa Rough Riders
- 1994: Saskatchewan Roughriders
- 1994–1995: Calgary Stampeders
- 1996: Ottawa Rough Riders
- 1997–1999: Saskatchewan Roughriders
- 2000–2001: Edmonton Eskimos
- 2002: Toronto Argonauts
- * Offseason or practice squad member only

Shawn Daniels (born September 3, 1966) is a Canadian former professional football fullback who played fourteen seasons in the Canadian Football League (CFL) with the Saskatchewan Roughriders, Ottawa Rough Riders, Calgary Stampeders, Edmonton Eskimos and Toronto Argonauts. He was selected by the Hamilton Tiger-Cats in the third round of the 1988 CFL draft. He played college football at Bowling Green State University.

== Early life and college ==
Shawn Daniels was born on September 3, 1966, in Montreal, Quebec. He attended Malcolm Campbell High School in Saint-Laurent, Quebec.

Daniels played college football at Snow College from 1985 to 1986. He was then a two-year letterman for the Bowling Green Falcons of Bowling Green State University from 1987 to 1988.

== Professional career ==
Daniels was selected by the Hamilton Tiger-Cats of the CFL in the third round, with the 19th overall pick, of the 1988 CFL draft but stayed in college for his final season. In 1988, the Tiger-Cats traded Pete Giftopoulos to the Saskatchewan Roughriders for a first round pick in the 1989 CFL draft and future considerations. On February 21, 1989, the considerations were finalized, with Daniels being traded to the Roughriders in exchange for a second round 1989 draft pick. He signed with the Dallas Cowboys of the National Football League in May 1989. He was released by the Cowboys on August 22, 1989.

Daniels then played in ten games for the Roughriders during the 1989 season. He played in fifty games for the CFL's Ottawa Rough Riders from 1990 to 1993. He played in twelve games for the Saskatchewan Roughriders in 1994. Daniels played in 24 games for the Calgary Stampeders of the CFL from 1994 to 1995. He played in twelve games for the Ottawa Rough Riders during the 1996 season. He was selected by the Saskatchewan Roughriders in the 1997 CFL Dispersal Draft due to the Ottawa Rough Riders folding. Daniels played in 43 games for the Saskatchewan Roughriders from 1997 to 1999. He played in 33 games for the Edmonton Eskimos of the CFL from 2000 to 2001. He played in seventeen games for the Toronto Argonauts of the CFL during the 2002 season.
