= Tim Bakker =

Canadian football player (born 1977)

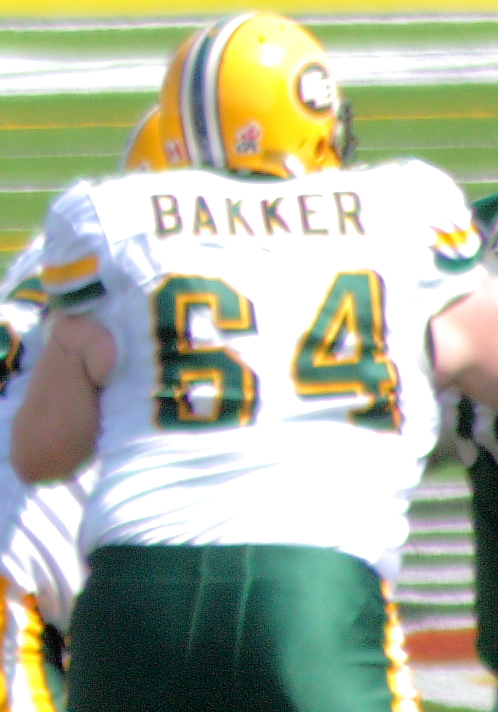
Bakker in 2007

Tim Bakker (born November 23, 1977) is a former Canadian football offensive lineman who played for the Edmonton Eskimos, BC Lions and Hamilton Tiger-Cats of the Canadian Football League. He is originally from Oakville, Ontario. He attended the University of Western Ontario, and played centre for the University's football team, the Western Mustangs. He played nine seasons in the CFL, from 2000 to 2008.
