= Tim Prinsen =

Canadian gridiron football player (born 1971)

Profile
- Position: Offensive lineman

Personal information
- Born: March 1, 1971 (age 55); Edmonton, Alberta, Canada
- Listed height: 6 ft 4 in (1.93 m)
- Listed weight: 300 lb (136 kg)

Career information
- College: North Dakota
- CFL draft: 1997: 1st round, 4th overall pick

Career history

Playing
- 1997–1999: Hamilton Tiger-Cats
- 2000–2004: Edmonton Eskimos

Coaching
- 2006–2009: Alberta Golden Bears (OL coach)
- 2010–2012: Edmonton Eskimos (OL coach)
- 2013–2015: Alberta Golden Bears (OL coach)
- 2016–2019: Edmonton Eskimos (RB coach)
- 2020: Saskatchewan Roughriders RB coach)

Awards and highlights
- 2× Grey Cup champion – (1999, 2003)

Tim Prinsen (born March 1, 1971) is a Canadian former professional football offensive lineman and formerly the running backs coach for the Saskatchewan Roughriders of the Canadian Football League (CFL). He was drafted fourth overall by the Hamilton Tiger-Cats in the 1997 CFL draft and played three seasons for the team, including a Grey Cup win in 1999. He then played for his hometown Eskimos for five seasons where he won his second championship in 2003. He played college football for the North Dakota Fighting Sioux.
