= Colin Scrivener =

Canadian football player (born 1970)

Profile
- Position: Defensive tackle

Personal information
- Born: January 4, 1970 (age 56); Winnipeg, Manitoba

Career information
- College: Oregon

Career history
- 1995–1997: Winnipeg Blue Bombers
- 1998–2002: Saskatchewan Roughriders

Colin Scrivener (born January 4, 1970) played in the Canadian Football League for eight years. Scrivener played defensive tackle for two teams from 1995-2002. His brother Glen also played in the CFL. He played his college football at the University of Oregon.
