= Ben Fairbrother =

Canadian football player (1973–2024)

Profile
- Position: Tackle

Personal information
- Born: June 23, 1973; Coventry, England, United Kingdom
- Died: September 13, 2024 (aged 51); Edmonton, Alberta, Canada
- Listed height: 6 ft 3 in (1.91 m)
- Listed weight: 305 lb (138 kg)

Career information
- University: Calgary

Career history
- 1997–2000 2001–2003: Saskatchewan Roughriders; BC Lions

Benjamin James Fairbrother (June 23, 1973 – September 13, 2024) was a Canadian football player who played for the BC Lions and Saskatchewan Roughriders.

== Biography ==
Fairbrother was born in Coventry, England on June 23, 1973. He attended high school in Calgary, Alberta. He played football at the University of Calgary from 1992 to 1997, winning the Vanier Cup in 1995. Between 1997 and 2003, he played 95 games in the Canadian Football League (CFL) with the Saskatchewan Roughriders and BC Lions. Following his retirement, he served as a coach with the Edmonton Wildcats. Fairbrother died in a motorcycle collision on September 13, 2024, at the age of 51.
