= 1997 Calgary Stampeders season =

Canadian football team season

- Owner: Sig Gutsche
- General manager: Wally Buono
- Head coach: Wally Buono
- Home stadium: McMahon Stadium

Results
- Record: 10–8
- Division place: 2nd, West
- Playoffs: Lost West Semi-Final

Uniform

The 1997 Calgary Stampeders finished in second place in the West Division with a 10–8 record. They appeared in the West Semi-Final and lost to the Saskatchewan Roughriders.

== Offseason ==
=== CFL draft ===
Rd	Pick	Player	Position	School
1	5 (via Winnipeg)	Doug Brown	DL	Simon Fraser
1	7	Jason Clemett	LB	SImon Fraser
2	15	Jeff Traversy	DT	Edinboro
3	21	Frank Rocca	OL	Eastern Michigan
4	29	Uzo Ubani	SB	Concordia
5	37	Trent Bagnail	OL	Saskatchewan
6	44	Paul Donkersley	RB	Acadia

=== Ottawa Rough Riders Dispersal Draft ===
Round	Pick	Player	Pos
1	7	Joseph Rogers	WR
2	15	Ray Bernard	LB
3	23	Troy Mills	RB
4	30	Charles Esty	G

== Preseason ==
Week	Date	Opponent	Result	Record	Venue	Attendance
A	Sat, June 7	at Winnipeg Blue Bombers	W 24–20	1–0		23,438
B	Tue, June 17	vs. BC Lions	W 30–18	2–0		29,000

== Regular season ==
=== Season standings ===
West Division
Pos	Team	Pld	W	L	T	PF	PA	PD	Pts
1	Edmonton Eskimos (C, Q)	18	12	6	0	479	400	+79	24
2	Calgary Stampeders (Q)	18	10	8	0	522	442	+80	20
3	Saskatchewan Roughriders (Q)	18	8	10	0	413	479	−66	16
4	BC Lions (Q)	18	8	10	0	429	536	−107	16

Source: "CFL.ca". Archived from the original on 2009-07-15.
(C) First round bye; (Q) Qualified for playoffs

=== Season schedule ===
Week	Date	Opponent	Result	Record	Venue	Attendance
1	Wed, June 25	vs. Edmonton Eskimos	L 22–23	0–1		24,868
2	Tue, July 3	at BC Lions	L 16–17	0–2		17,206
3	Wed, July 9	at Montreal Alouettes	L 28–34	0–3		7,669
4	Fri, July 18	vs. Saskatchewan Roughriders	W 22–13	1–3		30,366
5	Sat, July 26	at Saskatchewan Roughriders	L 19–21	1–4		26,483
6	Fri, Aug 1	vs. Winnipeg Blue Bombers	W 43–22	2–4		22,752
7	Thu, Aug 7	vs. Toronto Argonauts	W 45–35	3–4		25,311
8	Thu, Aug 14	at Winnipeg Blue Bombers	W 35–24	4–4		19,674
9	Fri, Aug 22	at BC Lions	L 23–37	4–5		20,303
10	Mon, Sep 1	vs. Edmonton Eskimos	W 27–14	5–5		37,611
11	Fri, Sept 5	at Edmonton Eskimos	L 20–24	5–6		43,913
12	Sun, Sep 14	vs. Saskatchewan Roughriders	W 28–24	6–6		28,414
13	Sun, Sep 21	at Hamilton Tiger-Cats	W 25–21	7–6		13,010
14	Sun, Sep 28	vs. Montreal Alouettes	W 43–22	8–6		27,153
15	Sun, Oct 5	at Edmonton Eskimos	L 32–42	8–7		31,572
16	Mon, Oct 13	vs. Hamilton Tiger-Cats	W 31–13	9–7		29,298
17	Sat, Oct 18	at Toronto Argonauts	L 17–48	9–8		24,083
18	Sun, Oct 26	vs. BC Lions	W 43–9	10–8		24,690

== Awards and records ==
- Jeff Nicklin Memorial Trophy – Jeff Garcia (QB)

== Playoffs ==
=== West Semi-Final ===
Team	Q1	Q2	Q3	Q4	Total
Saskatchewan Roughriders	?	?	?	?	33
Calgary Stampeders	?	?	?	?	30

== Roster ==
1997 Calgary Stampeders final roster
Quarterbacks: 15 Dave Dickenson; 7 Jeff Garcia; Running backs: 32 Kelvin Anderson; 28 Farell Duclair; 34 Duane Forde; Receivers: 88 Vince Danielsen; 23 J. P. Izquierdo; 83 Travis Moore; 18 Allen Pitts; 2 Terry Vaughn	Offensive linemen: 57 Chris Burns T; 68 Freddie Childress G/T; 67 Jamie Crysdale C; 50 Jay McNeil G; 63 Rohn Meyer G; 59 Rocco Romano T; Defensive linemen: 92 Steve Anderson DT; 95 Jermaine Miles DE; 96 Bronzell Miller DE; 91 Marvin Pope DE; 94 Jeff Traversy DT	Linebackers: 44 Ray Biggs; 35 Jason Clemett; 4 Darryl Hall; 51 Alondra Johnson; 41 Anthony McClanahan; 31 Roger Reinson; Defensive backs: 17 Marvin Coleman; 29 Eddie Davis; 9 Aldi Henry; 27 Al Jordan; 19 John Kalin; 6 Jackie Kellogg	Special teams: 11 Tony Martino P; 13 Mark McLoughlin K; Injured list: 60 Bruce Covernton T; 21 William Hampton DB; 8 Greg Knox DB; 30 Kenton Leonard DB; 3 Chris Lewis SB; Italics indicate International player
