= Ottawa Renegades all-time records and statistics =

The Ottawa Renegades played in the CFL for 4 seasons, between 2002 and 2006. They were the second Canadian Football League team to make Ottawa their home, following the Ottawa Rough Riders and preceding the Ottawa Redblacks.

== Scoring ==
Most points – career

- 277 – Lawrence Tynes
- 208 - Josh Ranek

Most points – season

- 198 – Lawrence Tynes – 2003
- 115 - Matt Kellett - 2005

Most touchdowns – career

- 33 – Josh Ranek
- 19 - Kerry Joseph

Most touchdowns – season

- 11 – Josh Ranek – 2003

== Passing ==
Most passing yards – career

- 10,962 – Kerry Joseph
- 3,177 – Dan Crowley

Most passing yards – season

- 4,466 – Kerry Joseph - 2005
- 3,698 – Kerry Joseph - 2003
- 2,762 – Kerry Joseph - 2004
- 2,697 – Dan Crowley - 2002

Most passing yards – game

- 436 - Kerry Joseph - 2004

Most passing touchdowns – career

- 57 – Kerry Joseph
- 18 – Dan Crowley

Most passing touchdowns – season

- 25 – Kerry Joseph - 2005
- 19 – Kerry Joseph - 2003
- 16 – Dan Crowley - 2002

Most passing touchdowns – game

- 3 - Dan Crowley - 2002
- 3 – Kerry Joseph - 2005
- 3 – Kerry Joseph - 2004

== Rushing ==
Most rushing yards – career

- 4,028 – Josh Ranek
- 2,004 – Kerry Joseph
- 545 - Darren Davis

Most rushing yards – season (all 1,000 yard rushers included)

- 1,157 – Josh Ranek – 2005
- 1,122 – Josh Ranek – 2003
- 1,060 - Josh Ranek - 2004
- 1,006 – Kerry Joseph - 2005

Most rushing yards – game

- 164 - Josh Ranek - 2005

== Receiving ==
Most receiving yards – career

- 2,252 – Josh Ranek
- 2,114 - Yo Murphy
- 1,915 - Jason Armstead
- 1,253 - Demetrius Bendross
- 1,004 - Jimmy Oliver
- 1,000 - D.J. Flick
- 994 - Denis Montana
- 860 – Pat Woodcock

Most receiving yards – season

- 1,307 - Jason Armstead - 2005
- 1,090 - Yo Murphy - 2004
- 1,004 – Jimmy Oliver – 2002

Most receiving yards – game

- 184 - Yo Murphy - 2004
- 173 - Jason Armstead - 2005

Most receptions – career

- 225 – Josh Ranek
- 137 - Yo Murphy
- 130 - Jason Armstead
- 88 - Demetrius Bendross
- 82 - Jimmy Oliver
- 74 - Denis Montana
- 64 - D.J. Flick
- 64 – Pat Woodcock

Most receptions – season

- 89 - Jason Armstead - 2005
- 82 - Jimmy Oliver - 2002
- 76 – Josh Ranek - 2005
- 61 - Yo Murphy - 2004
- 60 - D.J. Flick - 2003

Most receptions – game

- 11 - Josh Ranek - 2005

== Interceptions ==
Most interceptions – career

- 10 – Korey Banks
- 6 - Crance Clemons
- 5 - Gerald Vaughn
- 5 - Kyries Hebert
- 4 - Alfonso Roundtree
- 4 - John Grace
- 4 - Serge Sejour

Most interceptions – season

- 10 – Korey Banks – 2005
- 4 - Alfonso Roundtree - 2002

Most interceptions – game

- 3 - Kyries Hebert - 2005

== Quarterback sacks ==
Most sacks – career

- 17 - Jerome Haywood

Most sacks – season

- 12 – Anthony Collier – 2005
- 8 – Derrick Ford – 2002
- 7 – Keaton Cromartie – 2003
- 7 – Fred Perry – 2003

Most sacks – game

- 5 – Anthony Collier – 2005

== Defensive tackles ==
Most defensive tackles – career

- 241 - Kelly Wiltshire

Most defensive tackles – season

- 86 - Kelly Wiltshire - 2002
- 79 - Kelly Wiltshire - 2003
- 76 - Kelly Wiltshire - 2004
- 74 - John Grace - 2003
- 69 - Donovan Carter - 2002
- 66 - John Grace - 2002
- 66 - Kyries Hebert - 2005
- 62 - Gerald Vaughn - 2002
- 62 - Donovan Carter - 2003

== Special team tackles ==
Special team tackles – career

- 56 - Kyries Hebert

Special team tackles – season

- 29 – Kyries Hebert – 2005
- 27 – Kyries Hebert – 2004
- 19 – Mike Vilimek – 2004
- 18 – Tim Fleiszer – 2003
