= 2002 CFL expansion draft =

The 2002 Canadian Football League Expansion Draft was a three-round CFL draft that took place on January 17, 2002, which assigned players from existing CFL teams to the expansion Ottawa Renegades. Ottawa could select one import player from each team and two non-import players. Alternatively, the Renegades could select a team's second-round draft pick in the 2002 or 2003 CFL drafts in place of one of the non-import players. Additionally, member teams were permitted to protect two quarterbacks in the draft, limiting Ottawa's selections. Ottawa selected six quarterbacks from teams' negotiation lists and, as such, their names were not released.

== Round one ==
Player	Position	Original CFL team
Mike Maurer	Fullback	BC Lions
Clinton Wayne	Defensive tackle	Calgary Stampeders
George Hudson	Offensive lineman	Edmonton Eskimos
Matt Robichaud	Linebacker	Hamilton Tiger-Cats
Kelly Wiltshire	Linebacker	Montreal Alouettes
Shawn Gallant	Safety	Saskatchewan Roughriders
Dan Giancola	Punter/Placekicker	Toronto Argonauts
Donnie Ruiz	Safety	Winnipeg Blue Bombers

== Round two ==
Player	Position	Original CFL team
Jimmy Oliver	Wide receiver	BC Lions
Ricky Bell	Cornerback	Calgary Stampeders
Fred Perry	Defensive end	Edmonton Eskimos
Seth Dittman	Offensive tackle	Hamilton Tiger-Cats
John Grace	Linebacker	Montreal Alouettes
Troy Asbell	Linebacker	Saskatchewan Roughriders
Earl Scott	Centre	Toronto Argonauts
Sefa O'Reilly	Linebacker	Winnipeg Blue Bombers

== Round three ==
Player/Pick	Position	Original CFL team
2002 second-round pick	-	BC Lions
Kelly Lochbaum	Linebacker	Calgary Stampeders
Andrew Henry	Defensive back	Edmonton Eskimos
Carl Coulter	Centre	Hamilton Tiger-Cats
2002 second-round pick	-	Montreal Alouettes
2002 second-round pick	-	Saskatchewan Roughriders
2003 second-round pick	-	Toronto Argonauts
2003 second-round pick	-	Winnipeg Blue Bombers
