= Kojo Aidoo =

Canadian football player (born 1978)

Profile
- Position: Fullback

Personal information
- Born: November 27, 1978 (age 47); Kumasi, Ghana
- Listed height: 6 ft 0 in (1.83 m)
- Listed weight: 240 lb (109 kg)

Career information
- High school: St. Ignatius of Loyola C.S.S.
- University: McMaster
- CFL draft: 2003: 2nd round, 10th overall pick

Career history
- 2003: Edmonton Eskimos
- 2003: Winnipeg Blue Bombers
- 2004–2006: Hamilton Tiger-Cats
- 2007: Toronto Argonauts

Awards and highlights
- Hec Crighton Trophy (2000); Lois and Doug Mitchell Award (2001); Peter Gorman Trophy (1998)

Kojo Aidoo (born November 27, 1978) is a Ghanaian former professional Canadian football player. A fullback and special teams specialist, he played for the Edmonton Eskimos, Winnipeg Blue Bombers, Hamilton Tiger-Cats, and Toronto Argonauts in the Canadian Football League (CFL) from 2003 to 2007.

Originally from Ghana, Aidoo played college football for the McMaster Marauders from 1998 to 2002. Aidoo was most successful during the 2000 season, when he broke conference records for rushing yards and touchdowns. His performance earned him the Hec Crighton Trophy as the most outstanding university football player in Canada, and he was honored with numerous other accolades. After breaking his right leg while filming Brian's Song, Aidoo missed most of his final two seasons with the Marauders.

The Edmonton Eskimos selected Aidoo in the second round of the 2003 CFL draft. He went on to play for four CFL teams, spending the most time with the Hamilton Tiger-Cats. With the Tiger-Cats, Aidoo primarily played on special teams. He also occasionally started at fullback and served as a back-up for other players in the backfield. He retired from the CFL after playing in 60 regular season games and recording 20 special team tackles.

== Early life ==
Aidoo was a multi-sport athlete at St. Ignatius of Loyola High School, playing Canadian football, soccer, track and field, and basketball. With the track and field team, he was twice named most valuable player, participating in events including the 110 metres hurdles, shot put, and javelin. Aidoo played on the Loyola Hawks football team from 1995 to 1997, and he ruptured his spleen during a playoff game in 1996. Despite this, Aidoo increasingly focused on football, eventually leaving the track and field team in his final year. In 1997, he played for the Oakville-Burlington Invictas of the Great Lakes Football League, a junior football league. Aidoo played a major role on the Invictas, including rushing for 165 yards and two touchdowns on only 11 carries against the Essex Ravens. Returning to his high school football team in the fall, Aidoo helped the Hawks reach the Halton final in 1997. In both of his final two years at Loyola, he was selected as the High School Athlete of the Year.

== College career ==
According to McMaster Head Coach Greg Marshall, Aidoo was "one of the most recruited backs in Ontario". Marshall competed with Acadia University in his attempts to recruit Aidoo to the McMaster Marauders. After visiting Acadia, Aidoo decided to attend McMaster primarily due to its proximity to his hometown. He made an immediate impact on the Marauders. In October, Aidoo rushed for three touchdowns and 129 yards on 14 carries against the Windsor Lancers. Aidoo was named the Canadian Interuniversity Sport football (CIAU) Rookie of the Year for the 1998 season after finishing the season with 69 carries for 435 yards and 20 receptions for 205 yards with 11 total touchdowns. The Marauders finished the season with a 4–4 record and advanced to the playoffs for the first time in 12 years, where they lost to the first-ranked Western Ontario Mustangs 34–32. Head Coach Marshall praised Aidoo for his rookie season, saying he was "as good as or better a running back as a freshman as I've coached".

Aidoo was less successful in his second year, finishing with only 403 rushing yards and two touchdowns. The Marauders finished the season with a 6–2 record and were nationally ranked as high as fifth before losing to the Laval Rouge et Or. In December 1999, the Bernie Faloney Scholarship Award was awarded to Aidoo for "excellence on and off the field".

Led by a strong performance from Aidoo, the Marauders had their most successful season in 2000. In the season opener against the tenth-ranked Waterloo Warriors, Aidoo was afflicted by leg cramps early in the game. Despite this, he went on to rush for 244 yards and scored two touchdowns in the final two minutes of the game to secure a Marauders win, 41–33. By the second game of the season, Aidoo had topped his previous season's rushing yardage total with 414 yards. He went on to be named the CIAU Offensive Player Of The Week for scoring three touchdowns and rushing for 209 yards in a 47–15 upset of the third-ranked Wilfrid Laurier Golden Hawks. The large victory caused the Marauders to rise to third-place in the national rankings. Aidoo had his best game of the season against the Toronto Varsity Blues, scoring five touchdowns in a 62–0 blowout. The Marauders continued to improve to a 6–0 record against the Bishop's Gaiters, where Aidoo scored twice and ran for 230 yards.

The Marauders finished their 2000 season with a record of 7–1 and emerged at the top of their division. Aidoo broke conference records for rushing yardage and touchdowns with 1,329 yards and 20 touchdowns, averaging over 150 yards and two touchdowns per game. He was also named a first-team Ontario University Athletics (OUA) all-star. In the postseason, the Marauders won the Yates Cup by defeating the Wilfrid Laurier Golden Hawks, and Aidoo was named the most valuable player for the game with 168 yards and two touchdowns. McMaster lost 20–15 against the Ottawa Gee-Gees in the Churchill Bowl. They finished the season one game away from playing in the Vanier Cup. Aidoo was named the most valuable player in the OUA conference and won the Hec Crighton Trophy as the most outstanding university football player in the nation. Additionally, he was named CIAU Male Athlete of the Year, McMaster Male Athlete of the Year, and a finalist for the 2000 Golden Horseshoe Athlete of the Year. In April 2001, Aidoo was also one of three running backs selected for the McMaster Team of the Century.

Prior to the start of the 2001 season, Aidoo broke his leg while filming Brian's Song. Although initially expected to heal in time for training camp, Aidoo's recovery was slower than expected, and he missed the first two games of the season with a broken right fibula. Aidoo returned to the Marauders in mid-September. In his first game back, Aidoo scored two touchdowns and broke the OUA conference record for career touchdowns with 35 total majors. He played a large role in a 27–15 upset of first-ranked Ottawa, scoring two of three touchdowns in the final five minutes of the game. Due to recurring issues with his healing leg, Aidoo missed multiple games in October but returned for the playoffs.

He scored twice in his first game back against the York Yeomen and found the endzone again against Western in the conference semi-finals. McMaster won the Yates Cup after defeating the Ottawa Gee-Gees 30–22, but ended their season with a loss in the Churchill Bowl for the second year in a row. Aidoo described the 26–7 loss against the Manitoba Bisons as "a horrible game, probably the worst I've ever played". Aidoo was limited to only 69 carries for 390 yards in the 2001 season, but rushed for eight touchdowns. He was limited by his leg injury throughout the season, missing games and also receiving a reduced number of carries to prevent additional injury. Despite this, Aidoo was selected as one of two Canadians to play in the East–West Shrine Game, an American football post-season game that includes the best players from around the nation. The East–West Shrine Game is widely attended by scouts from the National Football League. Aidoo participated as a fullback for the East team and caught two receptions for four yards.

Although he was eligible to declare for the CFL draft, Aidoo chose to remain with the Marauders for the 2002 season, citing a desire to further recover from his leg injury. His season was again plagued by injury. Aidoo struggled in the season opener, rushing six times for 16 yards. Due to his recurring leg injury and a new back injury, he sat out the next five games. Aidoo returned in mid-October and played in a 72–0 blowout against the Toronto Varsity Blues, but he received only three carries. He also played on special teams. He did not appear in another game for the Marauders that season due to his leg injury.

In 2013, Aidoo was inducted into the McMaster Athletic Hall Of Fame.

== Professional career ==
Following the 2002 season, Aidoo's five years of college eligibility expired. He participated in a Canadian Football League (CFL) evaluation camp in March 2003, where he impressed commentators by bench pressing 250 pounds (110 kg). Aidoo was selected in the second round of the 2003 CFL draft by the Edmonton Eskimos with the tenth overall pick. Eskimos Head Coach Tom Higgins acknowledged Aidoo's injury history but stated the Eskimos "think he can do what we need him to do as far as blocking is concerned."

=== Edmonton Eskimos ===
The Eskimos acquired Deitan Dubuc during the offseason and intended to use him as their starting fullback, but Dubuc chose to sign with the Seattle Seahawks of the NFL. This allowed Aidoo the chance to compete for a starting position as a fullback. He also competed for a spot on the special teams as a kick returner. The Edmonton Journal noted that Aidoo looked "impressive" in training camp, but he had difficulties adapting to professional football. Aidoo earned a place on the regular season roster. He made his CFL debut on June 21, 2003, against the Montreal Alouettes. Aidoo recorded two special teams tackles in a Week 3 game against the Hamilton Tiger-Cats, which was Aidoo's first professional game played in his hometown. After playing 10 regular season games for the Eskimos, Aidoo was released on August 29, 2003. Eskimos Head Coach Higgins told the press Aidoo missed several team meetings, which played a role in his departure from the team. Aidoo made six special teams tackles with the Eskimos and rushed for two yards on a single carry.

=== Winnipeg Blue Bombers ===
Aidoo was signed by the Winnipeg Blue Bombers in October 2003 after starting defensive back Tom Europe's season ended due to an ankle injury. He remained with the Blue Bombers for the rest of the season, playing in two regular season games. The Blue Bombers lost the West Semi-Final to the Saskatchewan Roughriders 37–21, marking Aidoo's first playoff game in the CFL.

=== Hamilton Tiger-Cats ===
Prior to the 2004 season, Hamilton Tiger-Cats signed Greg Marshall as their head coach. Marshall coached Aidoo for five seasons with the McMaster Marauders, and quickly traded for the fullback. On February 12, 2004, the Tiger-Cats acquired Aidoo by trading a third-round pick in the 2004 CFL draft to the Blue Bombers. In training camp, Aidoo competed with Julian Radlein and Ray Thomas for the starting fullback position. While Aidoo made the opening roster, he did not earn a starting position. As the season progressed, Aidoo increasingly focused on special teams. The Ottawa Citizen called him a "star" player on special teams after a 20–17 win against the Ottawa Renegades in October. In his first season with the Tiger-Cats, Aidoo recorded two special teams tackles, caught one reception for 11 yards, and rushed for another 11 yards on six carries. He played in 12 regular season games.

Aidoo was designated as the backup running back out of training camp in 2005, with the Tiger-Cats electing to keep only the trio of Troy Davis, Aidoo, and fullback Julian Radlein on the roster as running backs. In August, Aidoo briefly stepped in for Davis after the latter suffered an injured hamstring. Through the first 11 regular season games, Aidoo made two special teams tackles and rushed for 51 yards on six carries. This led The Hamilton Spectator to speculate he would be dropped from the active roster in favor of recently signed running back Jesse Lumsden. After Troy was traded to the Eskimos, this never came to pass, and Aidoo started as a fullback for the last few games of the season. The Tiger-Cats did not make the playoffs. Aidoo finished the season with five special teams tackles and 116 rushing yards from 18 carries.

Aidoo was resigned by the Tiger-Cats prior to the 2006 season. In training camp, newcomer Les Mullings competed with Aidoo to become backup running back. Head Coach Greg Marshall praised Aidoo for his performance in training camp, saying "Kojo came into camp in great shape. The best shape I've ever seen him." Aidoo was rewarded with a spot on the active roster. He played in 16 regular season games, mostly on special teams. He finished the season with a career-high seven special teams tackles in 17 games, along with a single reception and two carries.

Head coach Greg Marshall was released prior to 2007 after two disappointing seasons, and Aidoo was viewed as "expendable" according to general manager Marcel Desjardins. He was released on April 19, 2007.

=== Toronto Argonauts ===
The Toronto Argonauts signed Aidoo to their practice squad on October 25, 2007. He later played in one regular season game for the Argonauts in the 2007 season.

=== Season statistics ===
| | | | Rushing | | | | | Receiving | | | | | Misc | |
| Year | Team | GP | Att | Yards | Avg | Long | TD | Rec | Yards | Avg | Long | TD | STT | Fumb. |
|---|---|---|---|---|---|---|---|---|---|---|---|---|---|---|
| 2003 | ESK | 10 | 1 | 2 | 2.0 | 2 | 0 | 0 | 0 | 0 | 0 | 0 | 6 | 0 |
| 2003 | WPG | 2 | 0 | 0 | 0 | 0 | 0 | 0 | 0 | 0 | 0 | 0 | 0 | 0 |
| 2004 | HAM | 12 | 6 | 11 | 1.8 | 3 | 0 | 1 | 11 | 11.0 | 11 | 0 | 2 | 0 |
| 2005 | HAM | 18 | 18 | 116 | 6.4 | 33 | 0 | 2 | 19 | 9.5 | 12 | 0 | 5 | 0 |
| 2006 | HAM | 17 | 2 | 4 | 2.0 | 2 | 0 | 1 | 15 | 15.0 | 15 | 0 | 7 | 1 |
| 2007 | TOR | 1 | 0 | 0 | 0 | 0 | 0 | 0 | 0 | 0 | 0 | 0 | 0 | 0 |
| Total | | 60 | 27 | 133 | 4.9 | 33 | 0 | 4 | 45 | 11.3 | 15 | 0 | 20 | 1 |

== Personal life ==
Kojo Aidoo was born to James and Janet Aidoo in Ghana, but moved to Oakville, Ontario later in life. His brother, Kwame Aidoo, was a cornerback for the McMaster Marauders and attended training camp with the Tiger-Cats in 2005.

Aidoo appeared in Second String, a fictional movie about a Buffalo Bills run to the Super Bowl, as a linebacker. He also appeared in the 2001 remake of Brian's Song.
