= 2006 CFL dispersal draft =

The CFL player dispersal draft was held with the disbanding of the Ottawa Renegades franchise in 2006. The draft took place on April 12 and consisted of eight rounds, with Kerry Joseph being selected first overall by Saskatchewan.

== Draft results ==
#	Player	Drafted by
Round 1
1.	Kerry Joseph (QB)	Saskatchewan Roughriders (via Hamilton)
2.	Ibrahim Khan (OL)	Winnipeg Blue Bombers
3.	Jason Armstead (WR)	Saskatchewan Roughriders
4.	Cam Yeow (LB)	Calgary Stampeders
5.	Val St. Germain (OL)	Winnipeg Blue Bombers (via Toronto)
6.	Korey Banks (DB)	BC Lions
7.	Kai Ellis (DE)	Montreal Alouettes
8.	Anthony Collier (DE)	Edmonton Eskimos
Round 2
9.	Pat Fleming (P)	Hamilton Tiger-Cats
10.	Mark Pilon (DL)	Toronto Argonauts (via Winnipeg)
11.	Cory Hathaway (FB)	Saskatchewan Roughriders
12.	Markus Howell (WR)	Calgary Stampeders
13.	Brad Banks (QB)	Winnipeg Blue Bombers (via Toronto)
14.	Matt Kirk (DL)	BC Lions
15.	Greg Moss (DB)	Montreal Alouettes
16.	Shaun Suisham (K)	Edmonton Eskimos
Round 3
17.	Gilles Lezi (FB)	Hamilton Tiger-Cats
18.	Hakeem Kashama (DL)	Winnipeg Blue Bombers
19.	Charles Howard (DT)	Saskatchewan Roughriders
20.	Crance Clemons (DB)	Calgary Stampeders
21.	David Azzi (WR)	Toronto Argonauts
22.	Sean Weston (DB)	BC Lions
23.	D'wayne Taylor (DB)	Montreal Alouettes
24.	L. P. Ladouceur (DT)	Edmonton Eskimos
Round 4
25.	Greg Bearman (DB)	Hamilton Tiger-Cats
26.	Cameron Legault (DL)	Winnipeg Blue Bombers
27.	Donald Ruiz (DB)	Saskatchewan Roughriders
28.	Jason Thomas (QB)	Calgary Stampeders
29.	Sean Poole (OL)	Toronto Argonauts
30.	Sandro Sciortino (K)	BC Lions
31.	Brandon Evans (OL)	Montreal Alouettes
32.	Pat Woodcock (WR)	Edmonton Eskimos
Round 5
33.	Steve Smith (DB)	Hamilton Tiger-Cats
34.	Lenard Semajuste (FB)	Winnipeg Blue Bombers
35.	Pass	Saskatchewan Roughriders
36.	Greg Cole (LB)	Calgary Stampeders
37.	Sean Bennett (RB)	Toronto Argonauts
38.	Anthony Jones (WR)	BC Lions
39.	Dwayne Levels (LB)	Montreal Alouettes
40.	Israel Idonije (DE)	Edmonton Eskimos
Round 6
41.	Pass	Hamilton Tiger-Cats
42.	Henri Childs (RB)	Winnipeg Blue Bombers
43.	Trevor Kine (OT)	Saskatchewan Roughriders
44.	Canary Knight (DT)	Calgary Stampeders
45.	Sean Riley (WR)	Toronto Argonauts
46.	Pass	BC Lions
47.	Kenny Smith (DL)	Montreal Alouettes
48.	Pass	Edmonton Eskimos
Round 7
49.	Pass	Hamilton Tiger-Cats
50.	Robert Grant (DB)	Winnipeg Blue Bombers
51.	Allen Burrell (WR)	Saskatchewan Roughriders
52.	Jamaal Perry (WR)	Calgary Stampeders
53.	Roderick Warren (WR)	Toronto Argonauts
54.	Pass	BC Lions
55.	David Ashkinaz (OL)	Montreal Alouettes
56.	Pass	Edmonton Eskimos
Round 8
57.	Pass	Hamilton Tiger-Cats
58.	Pass	Winnipeg Blue Bombers
59.	Pass	Saskatchewan Roughriders
60.	Pass	Calgary Stampeders
61.	Pass	Toronto Argonauts
62.	Pass	BC Lions
63.	Jeremy Pearl (DB)	Montreal Alouettes
64.	Pass	Edmonton Eskimos
