= Seth Dittman =

American football player (born 1972)

No. 74, 64, 62
- Position: Offensive tackle

Personal information
- Born: July 23, 1972; Newberg, Oregon, U.S.
- Died: May 31, 2025 (aged 52); Spring, Texas, U.S.
- Listed height: 6 ft 7 in (2.01 m)
- Listed weight: 300 lb (136 kg)

Career information
- High school: Tigard (Tigard, Oregon)
- College: Stanford (1990–1994)
- NFL draft: 1995: undrafted

Career history
- Miami Dolphins (1995)*; Green Bay Packers (1995)*; Indianapolis Colts (1995); Jacksonville Jaguars (1996)*; Tampa Bay Buccaneers (1997)*; → London Monarchs (1997); England Monarchs (1998); Hamilton Tiger-Cats (1998–1999); Minnesota Vikings (2000)*; Hamilton Tiger-Cats (2000); San Francisco Demons (2001); Hamilton Tiger-Cats (2001); Ottawa Renegades (2002–2003); Calgary Stampeders (2004)
- * Offseason or practice squad member only

Awards and highlights
- Grey Cup champion (1999); CFL West All-Star (2004)

Seth Derryck Dittman (July 23, 1972 – May 31, 2025) was an American professional football player who was an offensive tackle in the Canadian Football League (CFL) with the Hamilton Tiger-Cats, Ottawa Renegades, and Calgary Stampeders. He played college football for the Stanford Cardinal, and signed with the Miami Dolphins as an undrafted free agent. He was a member of the Indianapolis Colts' active roster in 1995. Dittman played in the CFL from 1998 to 2004, winning the 87th Grey Cup in 1999 and earning CFL West All-Star honors in 2004. He also played in NFL Europe and the XFL.

== Early life ==
Seth Derryck Dittman was born on July 23, 1972, in Newberg, Oregon. He played high school football at Tigard High School in Tigard, Oregon, and earned first-team all-state honors as a senior in 1989. He graduated from Tigard High in 1990.

Dittman enrolled at Stanford University to play college football for the Stanford Cardinal. He redshirted the 1990 season and was a four-year letterman from 1991 to 1994. He was the third-string left tackle in 1992 and started two games. Dittman was a first-stringer from 1993 to 1994. He was named to the Pac-10 All-Academic team in 1993.

== Professional career ==
After going unselected in the 1995 NFL draft, Dittman signed with the Miami Dolphins on April 28, 1995. He was released on August 21. Dittman was signed to the Green Bay Packers' practice squad on August 29, but later waived on September 6 to make room for kicker Dirk Borgognone. On December 19, 1995, Dittman was signed to the active roster of the Indianapolis Colts. However, he did not play in any games for the team during the 1995 season. He was released by the Colts on August 16, 1996. Dittman was signed to the Jacksonville Jaguars' practice squad on August 27, and was released on December 3, 1996.

Dittman signed with the Tampa Bay Buccaneers on February 4, 1997. He was allocated to the World League of American Football (WLAF), where he played for the London Monarchs during the 1997 WLAF season. He was released by Tampa Bay on August 24, 1997.

In February 1998, Dittman was selected by the newly-renamed England Monarchs in the 1998 NFL Europe draft. He played for the Monarchs during the 1998 NFL Europe season, and thereafter signed with the Hamilton Tiger-Cats of the Canadian Football League (CFL) on June 27, 1998. During the 1998 CFL season, Dittman started all 18 regular season games and both of Hamilton's playoff games (including the 86th Grey Cup loss). He was Hamilton's nominee for the Most Outstanding Rookie Award. Dittman started all 18 regular games again in 1999 and all three playoff games (including the 87th Grey Cup victory). The 87th Grey Cup was the last championship in franchise history. The 1999 Tiger-Cats only gave up seven sacks, setting a record for the lowest sack total in CFL history. At 6 feet 7 inches (2.01 m) and 300 pounds (140 kg), Dittman was the biggest player on the Tiger-Cats.

Dittman then signed with the Minnesota Vikings on July 3, 2000. He was released on August 14, 2000.

Dittman re-signed with the Tiger-Cats on August 31, 2000, and started the final ten games of the season. After the 2000 season, Dittman requested (and was granted) his release from the Tiger-Cats to play for the San Francisco Demons of the upstart XFL. He played in all ten games, starting eight, for the Demons during the 2001 XFL season. The Demons made it to the XFL championship game (the Million Dollar Game) but lost to the Los Angeles Xtreme by a score of 38–6. Dittman re-signed with the Tiger-Cats on May 8, 2001, and started all 18 games for them in 2001.

On January 17, 2002, Dittman was selected by the Ottawa Renegades in the second round of the 2002 CFL expansion draft. He dressed in all 18 games for the Renegades in 2002, and was Ottawa's nominee for the Most Outstanding Lineman Award. He re-signed with the team for the 2003 season, during which he dressed in all 18 games again.

On January 13, 2004, the Renegades traded Dittman, John Grace, Fred Perry, and Romaro Miller to the Calgary Stampeders for Anthony Malbrough, Kai Ellis, the negotiation rights to Sandro Sciortino, the negotiation rights to Jerry Johnson, and the second overall pick in the 2004 CFL draft. Dittman dressed in all 18 games for the Stampeders in 2004, and was named a CFL West All-Star. However, the Calgary Herald claimed that Dittman was the fourth-best offensive lineman on the Stampeders, insinuating that the CFL All-Star teams were a popularity contest. In a 2004 Winnipeg Sun poll, Dittman was named the second-nicest player in the league. In April 2005, it was reported that the Stampeders had released Dittman after not being able to find any trade suitors. He dressed in 118 games overall during his CFL career.

== Personal life ==
Dittman had a Master of Science in engineering. Canadian Football Hall of Fame quarterback Danny McManus said Dittman was the smartest offensive lineman he ever played with.

Dittman was a Christian. He met his wife at a church in Ottawa in 2002. He became an engineer in Ontario after his CFL career. In 2022, Dittman moved to Spring, Texas. He died on May 31, 2025, in Spring.
