= Radlein =

Radlein is a surname. Notable people with the surname include:

- Julian Radlein (born 1981), Canadian football player
- Sharlene Rädlein (born 1990), Jamaican model and beauty pageant winner
