= Ottawa Canadian Football League team =

The Canadian Football League has had two franchises based in the city of Ottawa. A third franchise started in 2014.

- Ottawa Rough Riders (1876–1996, founding member of the CFL in 1958)
- Ottawa Renegades (2002–2006)
- Ottawa Redblacks (2014–)
