= Stuart Turner (baseball) =

American baseball player (born 1991)

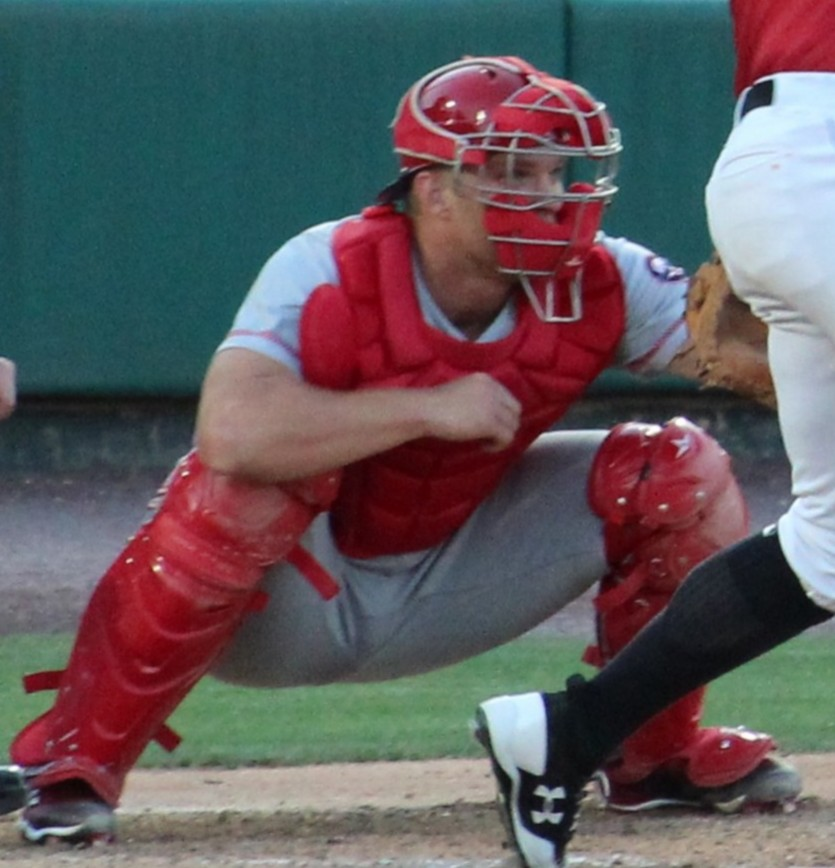
- Turner with the Louisville Bats in 2018
- Catcher
- Born: December 27, 1991 (age 34); Eunice, Louisiana, U.S.
- Batted: Right Threw: Right

MLB debut
- April 6, 2017, for the Cincinnati Reds

Last MLB appearance
- September 30, 2017, for the Cincinnati Reds

MLB statistics
- Batting average: .134
- Home runs: 2
- Runs batted in: 7
- Stats at Baseball Reference

Teams
- Cincinnati Reds (2017)

Randy Stuart Turner (born December 27, 1991) is an American former professional baseball catcher. He played in Major League Baseball (MLB) for the Cincinnati Reds in 2017. Prior to playing professionally, he played college baseball for the Ole Miss Rebels and won the Johnny Bench Award. He is now a coach for Eunice High School in his home town.

== Career ==
Turner is from Eunice, Louisiana. After he graduated from Eunice High School, he enrolled at Louisiana State University at Eunice. He transferred to the University of Mississippi (Ole Miss), where he played college baseball for the Ole Miss Rebels baseball team. In 2013, he won a Gold Glove Award from the American Baseball Coaches Association and the Johnny Bench Award, given annually to best catcher in the National Collegiate Athletic Association's Division I.

=== Minnesota Twins ===
The Minnesota Twins selected Turner in the third round of the 2013 Major League Baseball draft. He signed with the Twins, and played for the Elizabethton Twins of the Rookie-level Appalachian League. The Twins invited him to spring training in 2014, and assigned him to the Fort Myers Miracle of the High–A Florida State League. In 2015, he played for the Chattanooga Lookouts of the Double–A Southern League, where he posted a .223 batting average with four home runs and 37 RBIs. Turner returned to the Lookouts in 2016, where he batted .239 with six home runs and 41 RBI.

=== Cincinnati Reds ===
On December 8, 2016, during the Winter Meetings, the Cincinnati Reds selected Turner from the Twins in the Rule 5 draft. Turner made the Reds' Opening Day roster in 2017 and made his major league debut on April 6. On August 11, he hit his first Major League home run off of San Diego Padres pitcher Travis Wood. In 37 games during his rookie campaign, Turner batted .134/.182/.244 with two home runs and seven RBI.

The Reds optioned Turner to the minor leagues at the end of spring training in 2018. He was designated for assignment on March 31, 2018, and sent outright to the Triple–A Louisville Bats on April 4. He was released on March 27, 2019, but re–signed with the team on a minor league deal on April 18. In 28 games for Louisville, Turner hit .156/.190/.208 with one home run and 11 RBI. He elected free agency following the season on November 4.

== Personal life ==
Turner has two brothers. He was diagnosed with diabetes mellitus type 1 while he was in the seventh grade.

Turner and his wife, Danielle, had their first child, son Easton Michael, in August 2017.

== See also ==
- Rule 5 draft results
