= Dwayne Levels =

American gridiron football player (born 1979)

No. 57, 52
- Position: Linebacker

Personal information
- Born: May 9, 1979 (age 47); Lubbock County, Texas, U.S.
- Listed height: 6 ft 2 in (1.88 m)
- Listed weight: 248 lb (112 kg)

Career information
- High school: Richardson (Richardson, Texas)
- College: Oklahoma State (1997–2001)
- NFL draft: 2002: undrafted

Career history
- Cincinnati Bengals (2002–2004); Barcelona Dragons (2003); Ottawa Renegades (2006)*; Montreal Alouettes (2006)*
- * Offseason or practice squad member only

Career NFL statistics
- Games played: 13
- Total tackles: 15
- Stats at Pro Football Reference

Ernest Dwayne Levels (born May 9, 1979) is an American former professional football player who was a linebacker for three seasons in the National Football League (NFL) for the Cincinnati Bengals. He also spent one season in the Canadian Football League (CFL), but did not play. Levels played college football for the Oklahoma State Cowboys and was signed by the Bengals as an undrafted free agent in 2002.

== Early life and education ==
Levels was born on May 9, 1979, in Lubbock County, Texas. He attended Richardson High School in Richardson, Texas, before playing college football for Oklahoma State University. Upon joining the school in 1997, Levels was given a redshirt. He joined the varsity squad the following year, and became a regular starter shortly afterwards. In 2000, Levels was one of the best players on the roster, and made 16 tackles in one game. Teammate Zac Akin said, "Oh, he played his heart and soul out. It's ridiculous. The last few games, he's been barely able to get off the field a couple of times. This game, he's throwing up on the sidelines, goes back in there, makes a couple plays. Finally, we get him talked into going off the field. He's just dying out there. It's amazing. Dwayne is amazing." He returned for a final season in 2001, playing in all eleven games, and made a 57-yard interception return touchdown.

== Professional career ==
After going unselected in the 2002 NFL draft, Levels signed with the Cincinnati Bengals as an undrafted free agent. He was released at roster cuts and subsequently signed to their practice squad, where he spent the remainder of the season. He was sent to the Barcelona Dragons of NFL Europe in early 2003, and "had an outstanding season", starting all ten games and making 57 tackles. He made the Bengals final roster upon returning, and spent the season playing on special teams and as a backup linebacker. He made his first career start against the Baltimore Ravens in week seven, recording three tackles in the 34–26 win. He finished the season with 15 combined tackles in 13 games. He was waived by the Bengals in July 2004. After spending time out of football in 2005, Levels was signed by the Ottawa Renegades of the Canadian Football League (CFL) in early 2006, only to see them fold shortly afterwards. He was later selected in the 2006 CFL Dispersal Draft by the Montreal Alouettes, but was released in training camp.
