= Derrick Ned =

American football player (born 1969)

No. 36
- Position: Fullback

Personal information
- Born: January 5, 1969 (age 57); Eunice, Louisiana, U.S.
- Listed height: 6 ft 1 in (1.85 m)
- Listed weight: 220 lb (100 kg)

Career information
- High school: Eunice
- College: Grambling State (1988–1991)
- NFL draft: 1992: undrafted

Career history
- Houston Oilers (1992)*; New Orleans Saints (1992–1995); Kansas City Chiefs (1996)*
- * Offseason or practice squad member only

Career NFL statistics
- Rushing yards: 108
- Rushing average: 4.7
- Receptions: 25
- Receiving yards: 149
- Total touchdowns: 1
- Stats at Pro Football Reference

Derrick Deyone Ned (born January 5, 1969) is an American former professional football player who was a fullback for the New Orleans Saints of the National Football League (NFL) from 1993 to 1995. He played college football for the Grambling State Tigers.
