= Greg Moss =

American gridiron football player and coach (born 1982)

Current position
- Title: Sr. Defensive Analyst
- Team: Florida State Seminoles
- Conference: ACC

Playing career
- 2008–2010: Florida International
- 2005: Ottawa Renegades
- 2006: Montreal Alouettes
- 2007: Winnipeg Blue Bombers
- Positions: Defensive back, return specialist

Coaching career (HC unless noted)
- 2008–2011: Nova HS (FL) (DB)
- 2012–2014: Florida International (DQC)
- 2015–2016: Florida International (DB)
- 2017–2018: Carol City HS (FL) (AHC/DC)
- 2019–2020: Charleston Southern (DB)
- 2021: Charleston Southern (STC/DB
- 2022–present: Florida State (Sr. Analyst)

Greg Moss (born September 2, 1982) is an American football coach and former defensive back. He played in the Canadian Football League (CFL) for the Ottawa Renegades and Winnipeg Blue Bombers. In 2006, he was selected in the Renegades' dispersal draft by the Montreal Alouettes.

He is the cousin of brothers Santana and Sinorice Moss, who were both wide receivers in the National Football League. Greg is also the cousin of Lloyd Moss, wide receiver for Florida International University.

== Early years ==
Moss attended Norland High School in Miami, Florida. While there, he starred in football, basketball, and track. As a senior, in football, he posted five interceptions, 50 tackles, a fumble recovery and 2 touchdowns, was a Miami-Dade All-Star, and the recipient of the Coach's Award.

== Coaching career ==
Served as Defensive Backs coach at Nova High School in Davie, Fl from 2008-2011. Was the Defensive Quality Control (Secondary) at Florida International University (FIU) from 2012 to 2014, then was promoted to Defensive Back Coach following the 2014 season. Starting in the fall of 2019 Greg Moss was hired at Charleston Southern University as the Secondary Coach.
