= Dan Crowley (Canadian football) =

American football player (born 1973)

Profile
- Position: Quarterback

Personal information
- Born: March 14, 1973 (age 53); Washington, D.C., U.S.
- Listed height: 6 ft 1 in (1.85 m)
- Listed weight: 185 lb (84 kg)

Career information
- High school: DeMatha Catholic (Hyattsville, Maryland)
- College: Towson

Career history
- 1995: Baltimore Stallions
- 1996: Montreal Alouettes
- 1998–1999: Bergamo Lions
- 1999–2001: Edmonton Eskimos
- 2002–2003: Ottawa Renegades

Awards and highlights
- Grey Cup champion (1995); Italian Bowl champion (1998, 1999); Italian Football League Offensive Player of the Year (1998); Italian Bowl Game MVP (1998); Towson Tigers Athletic Hall of Fame Inductee (2010)

Dan Crowley (born March 14, 1973) is an American former professional football player who was a quarterback in the Canadian Football League (CFL) and Italian Football League (IFL). He played college football for the Towson Tigers, setting several school records. After college, Crowley professionally debuted in 1995 for the CFL USA team, the Baltimore Stallions. Crowley also played for the Montreal Alouettes in 1996. After playing for the IFL's Bergamo Lions from 1998 to 1999, Crowley returned to the CFL and played for the Edmonton Eskimos from 1999 until 2001. Known as a career backup, Crowley received his first major starting opportunity with the expansion Ottawa Renegades in 2002, becoming the team's first starting quarterback.

== Early life and college ==
A Bowie, Maryland native, Crowley attended DeMatha Catholic High School. He graduated from DeMatha in 1991.

Crowley then played college football for the Towson Tigers, who represent Towson University, from 1991 to 1994. During his time at Towson, the school was named Towson State University. During his junior season in 1993, Crowley set the school record for career passing touchdowns at 51.

Crowley ended his Towson career with school records in passing attempts (1,169), completions (617), yards (8,900), and touchdowns (81). He started 35 of 40 games, achieving a 22–13 record as a starter.

== Professional career ==
=== Baltimore Stallions ===
Crowley was signed as a free agent by the Baltimore Stallions in 1995. As a member of the team, Crowley was part of the 83rd Grey Cup Championship winning team.

=== Montreal Alouettes ===
After a season with the Stallions, Crowley signed with Montreal Alouettes in 1996. During his tenure with Montreal, he served as a backup to Tracy Ham. The Alouettes cut him after the team's first game in 1997.

=== Bergamo Lions ===
Crowley signed with the Bergamo Lions of the Italian Football League (IFL) and European Football League (EFL). Crowley led the Lions to consecutive IFL championships in 1998 and 1999. In the 1998 season, he was named the league's offensive player of the year and MVP of the Italian Bowl championship game. In 1999, he passed for 1,339 yards and 18 touchdowns. The Lions also played in the European Football League, losing in the quarterfinals of the 1999 tournament playoffs.

=== Edmonton Eskimos ===
After playing semi-professionally in Italy, Crowley signed with the Edmonton Eskimos in 1999, and would play on the team for three seasons. Crowley started 4 games for the Eskimos.

=== Ottawa Renegades ===
After being a career backup in the CFL, Crowley received an opportunity to start at quarterback for the expansion Ottawa Renegades in 2002. Additionally, he would be the franchise's first starting quarterback. Crowley, however, played average football in his 13 starts throughout Ottawa's inaugural season. After inconsistent play to start the following season, he was released by the team. Renegades owner Eric Tillman stated, "This was a very difficult decision because of the tremendous respect we have for Dan as a person," but added, "Unfortunately, we're not getting the production we hoped for." Crowley was replaced by Kerry Joseph, who went on to pass Crowley in terms of franchise records.

== After football ==
After his professional football career ended, Crowley became a staff member of Towson University's athletic department. In 2010, he was inducted into the university's athletic Hall of Fame.

== Career statistics ==
=== College ===
Year	Team	Games			Passing							
Year	Team	GP	GS	Record	Comp	Att	Pct	Yards	Avg	TD	Int	Rate
1991	Towson State	10	5	1–4	–	–	–	1,783	–	16	–	–
1992	Towson State	10	10	5–5	–	–	–	2,322	–	14	–	–
1993	Towson State	10	10	8–2	–	217	–	1,882	–	23	4	–
1994	Towson State	10	10	8–2	–	–	–	2,913	–	28	–	–
Totals		40	35	22–13	617	1,169	52.8	8,900	7.6	81	–	–

=== CFL ===
		Passing									Rushing				
Year	Team	GP	GS	Comp	Att	Pct	Yards	TD	Int	Rating	Att	Yards	Avg	Long	TD
1995	BAL	18	0	2	8	50.0	21	0	1	0.0	–	–	–	–	–
1996	MTL	8	0	5	15	33.3	39	0	1	14.6	–	–	–	–	–
1999	EDM	18	1	22	49	44.9	216	0	3	32.4	6	36	6.0	9	0
2000	EDM	18	3	94	178	52.8	1,313	10	13	65.1	19	143	7.5	20	1
2001	EDM	18	0	13	26	50.0	167	1	0	83.3	1	19	19.0	19	0
2002	OTT	18	13	223	454	49.1	2,697	16	19	62.1	41	275	6.7	35	4
2003	OTT	3	3	43	86	50.0	480	2	3	60.2	9	57	6.3	17	0
Totals		101	20	402	816	49.3	4,933	29	40	–	76	530	7.0	35	5
