= Dale Sittig =

American politician

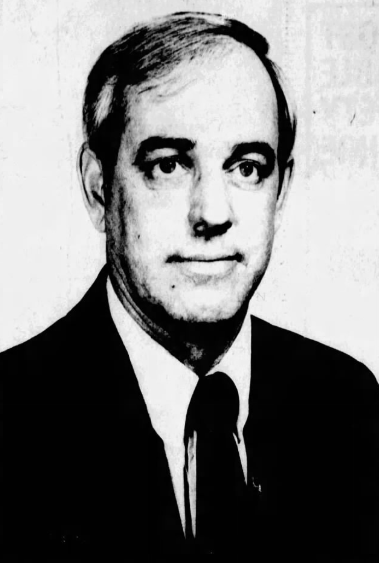
- Sittig in 1983

Member of the Louisiana House of Representatives
- In office 1983–1995
- Preceded by: Louis Dischler Jr.
- Succeeded by: Gregory L. Fruge

Member of the Louisiana Public Service Commission
- In office 1995–2008
- Preceded by: Thomas E. Powell Sr.
- Succeeded by: Clyde C. Holloway

Personal details
- Born: Clifton Dale Sittig; July 26, 1940 (age 85) Eunice, Louisiana, U.S.
- Party: Democratic

Clifton Dale Sittig (born July 26, 1940) is an American politician. A member of the Democratic Party, he served in the Louisiana House of Representatives from 1983 to 1995 and in the Louisiana Public Service Commission from 1995 to 2008.

== Life and career ==
Sittig was born in Eunice, Louisiana, the son of Walter and Helen Sittig. He attended Eunice High School, graduating in 1959. After graduating, he attended McNeese State University, but did not graduate, which after attending the university, he worked as a farmer.

Sittig served in the Louisiana House of Representatives from 1983 to 1995. After his service in the House, he served in the Louisiana Public Service Commission from 1995 to 2008.
