= St. Edmund Catholic School (Eunice, Louisiana) =

Location
- 351 West Magnolia Avenue; Eunice, (St. Landry Parish), Louisiana 70535; United States; 30°29′50″N 92°25′4″W

Information
- Type: Private elementary and high school
- Motto: Unity; Cooperation; Kindness
- Religious affiliation: Catholic
- Established: 1911; 115 years ago
- Founder: Celestin Chambon
- Principal: Mitch Fontenot
- Pastor: Hampton Davis
- Chaplain: John Dugas
- Teaching staff: 26.9 (FTE) (2019–20)
- Grades: PK–12
- Gender: coeducational
- Age range: ages 3-18
- Enrollment: 323 (2019–20)
- Student to teacher ratio: 12.0 (2019–20)
- Colors: Royal Blue and white
- Athletics conference: LHSAA
- Mascot: Blue Jay
- Nickname: Fighting Blue Jays
- Accreditation: Southern Association of Colleges and Schools
- Communities served: Eunice, Louisiana
- Affiliation: St. Anthony of Padua Catholic Church, Eunice
- Website: stedmund.com

St. Edmund Catholic School is a private, Catholic elementary school and high school in Eunice, Louisiana, United States. It is located in the Diocese of Lafayette.

== Background ==
St. Edmund Catholic School was established in 1911. It is the home of the St. Edmund Blue Jays. It enrolls students in grades PK-3 through 12. St. Edmund is a ministry of St. Anthony of Padua Catholic Church.

== Athletics ==
St. Edmund High athletics competes in the LHSAA.

== Notable alumni ==
- Carlton Loewer – American baseball player (born 1973)
- Phillip DeVillier – American politician (born 1976)
