= Wes Lysack =

Canadian football player (born 1978)

No. 31
- Position: Defensive back

Personal information
- Born: March 3, 1978 (age 48); Edmonton, Alberta, Canada
- Listed height: 6 ft 1 in (1.85 m)
- Listed weight: 201 lb (91 kg)

Career information
- University: Manitoba
- CFL draft: 2003: 1st round, 5th overall pick

Career history
- 2003–2004: Calgary Stampeders
- 2004–2005: Winnipeg Blue Bombers
- 2005–2010: Calgary Stampeders
- 2011: Toronto Argonauts

Awards and highlights
- Grey Cup champion (2008); CFL West All-Star (2004); Tom Pate Memorial Award (2090)
- Stats at CFL.ca (archive)

Wes Lysack (born March 3, 1978) is a Canadian former professional football defensive back who played in the Canadian Football League (CFL). He was drafted by the Calgary Stampeders in the first round with the fifth overall pick in the 2003 CFL draft. He played CIS Football for the University of Manitoba after playing his freshman year for Rutgers .

Lysack also played for the Winnipeg Blue Bombers and Toronto Argonauts. He won a Grey Cup with the Stampeders in 2008.

On February 16, 2011, Lysack signed with the Argonauts. After one season with the team, he was released on February 13, 2012.

He has also played in the Winnipeg, Manitoba Major Football League, with the St. Vital Mustangs.
