= Steve Morley =

Canadian gridiron football player (born 1981)

- Morley in 2004

No. 62
- Position: Guard

Personal information
- Born: August 18, 1981 (age 45); Halifax, Nova Scotia, Canada
- Listed height: 6 ft 7 in (2.01 m)
- Listed weight: 290 lb (132 kg)

Career information
- High school: Queen Elizabeth
- University: Saint Mary's University
- CFL draft: 2003: 1st round, 1st overall pick

Career history
- 2003: Calgary Stampeders
- 2004: Green Bay Packers
- 2005: Rhein Fire
- 2005: New York Jets
- 2007: Seattle Seahawks*
- 2007: Toronto Argonauts
- 2008: Saskatchewan Roughriders
- 2009–14: Winnipeg Blue Bombers
- * Offseason or practice squad member only
- Stats at Pro Football Reference
- Stats at CFL.ca

Steven Joseph Morley (born August 18, 1981) is a former guard for the Winnipeg Blue Bombers of the Canadian Football League. He was drafted with the first overall pick in the 2003 CFL draft by the Calgary Stampeders. He played CIS Football at Saint Mary's.

Morley has also been a member of the Green Bay Packers, Rhein Fire, New York Jets, Seattle Seahawks, Toronto Argonauts, Saskatchewan Roughriders, and Winnipeg Blue Bombers.

Morley acted in the background in the movie remake of Ice Castles. The director, Donald Wrye, filmed a remake of the movie in 2009, which starred Taylor Firth and was released in 2010.

== Early life ==
Steve Morley attended Queen Elizabeth High School in Halifax, Nova Scotia, Canada from 1996-1999. In 1996 he was named team Rookie of the year and in 1999 he was named team Lineman of the year. Morley helped to lead the Lions football team to the Provincial Championships in 1998.

== Saint Mary's University ==
Morley played football for the Saint Mary's University Huskies from 1999-2002, a period when the team won two Vanier Cup national championships in 2001 and 2002. He was named the AUS J.P. Metras Award Winner in 2002 for being the conference's top lineman.
