= Ray Mariuz =

Canadian football player (born 1980)

Profile
- Position: Linebacker

Personal information
- Born: December 25, 1980 (age 45); Mississauga, Ontario, Canada
- Listed height: 6 ft 3 in (1.91 m)
- Listed weight: 228 lb (103 kg)

Career information
- University: McMaster
- CFL draft: 2003: 4th round, 28th overall pick

Career history
- 2003–2005: Toronto Argonauts
- 2006–2010: Hamilton Tiger-Cats
- 2011: Hamilton Tiger-Cats

Awards and highlights
- Grey Cup champion (2004)
- Stats at CFL.ca (archive)

Ray Mariuz (born December 25, 1980) is a Canadian former professional football linebacker He was drafted 28th overall by the Toronto Argonauts in the 2003 CFL draft and won a Grey Cup championship in 2004. In 2011, Mariuz retired from professional football. However, he would come out of retirement later in the 2011 CFL season and finish the season with the Hamilton Tiger-Cats. He played CIS football for the McMaster Marauders.

Mariuz now works as a sales distributor for Conmed Linvatech.
