= Joe McGrath (Canadian football) =

Canadian gridiron football player (born 1980)

No. 63
- Position: Offensive tackle

Personal information
- Born: November 27, 1980 (age 45); Moose Jaw, Saskatchewan, Canada
- Listed height: 6 ft 5 in (1.96 m)
- Listed weight: 290 lb (132 kg)

Career information
- High school: Vanier
- College: Miami
- CFL draft: 2003: 1st round, 2nd overall pick

Career history
- 2004–2008: Edmonton Eskimos
- 2009: Saskatchewan Roughriders*
- 2009–2010: Edmonton Eskimos
- 2010: BC Lions
- 2011: Calgary Stampeders*
- * Offseason or practice squad member only

Awards and highlights
- 93rd Grey Cup champion; 2× Eskimos' Most Outstanding Lineman (2006, 2007)
- Stats at CFL.ca

Joe McGrath (born November 27, 1980) is a Canadian former professional football offensive tackle. He was drafted by the Stampeders in the first round of the 2003 CFL draft. He played college football for the Miami Hurricanes.

== Early life ==
McGrath was coached by his father at Vanier Collegiate Institute in Moose Jaw and was considered an all-star in both football and basketball and the number two Canadian high school lineman at graduation.

McGrath played college football from 1999 through 2003 for the Miami Hurricanes, three years as a regular at left guard. He won a national championship with the Hurricanes in 2001.

== Professional career ==
=== First stint with Eskimos ===
McGrath was drafted second overall in the 2003 CFL draft by the Calgary Stampeders but was signed by the Edmonton Eskimos as a free agent on July 7, 2004. He appeared in 15 games at left tackle in the 2004 CFL season, all 18 regular-season games plus the playoffs and the victory in the 93rd Grey Cup in the 2005 CFL season, and started all 18 regular-season games in the 2006 CFL season. He was nominated by the Eskimos for the CFL's Most Outstanding Offensive Lineman Award in 2006.

=== Saskatchewan Roughriders ===
On February 16, 2009, McGrath became a free agent and was reportedly signed the same day by the Saskatchewan Roughriders.

=== Second stint with Eskimos ===
McGrath requested a trade back to Edmonton, and his request was granted on June 11, 2009. He was released on August 11, 2010.

=== BC Lions ===
On August 19, 2010, the BC Lions added the recently released McGrath to the offensive line. He was released during the following off-season on May 24, 2011.

=== Calgary Stampeders ===
On October 18, 2011, McGrath was signed to the practice roster of the Calgary Stampeders.
