= Mike Labinjo =

Canadian football player (1980–2018)

No. 59, 92, 42
- Positions: Defensive end, Linebacker

Personal information
- Born: July 8, 1980; Toronto, Ontario, Canada
- Died: September 21, 2018 (aged 38); Calgary, Alberta, Canada
- Listed height: 6 ft 0.5 in (1.84 m)
- Listed weight: 284 lb (129 kg)

Career information
- High school: St. Michael's College
- College: Michigan State
- CFL draft: 2003: 3rd round, 25th overall pick

Career history
- 2004-2005: Philadelphia Eagles
- 2005: Indianapolis Colts
- 2005–2006: Miami Dolphins
- 2007: Indianapolis Colts*
- 2007–2010: Calgary Stampeders
- * Offseason or practice squad member only

Awards and highlights
- Grey Cup champion (2008)

Career CFL statistics
- Total tackles: 20
- Sacks: 0.5
- Stats at Pro Football Reference
- Stats at CFL.ca

Michael Labinjo (July 8, 1980 – September 21, 2018) was a Canadian professional football player who was a defensive end in the National Football League (NFL) and Canadian Football League (CFL). He played college football for the Michigan State Spartans, and professionally for the Calgary Stampeders, Philadelphia Eagles, Indianapolis Colts, and Miami Dolphins.

== Early life ==
Labinjo was born in Toronto, Ontario, and attended St. Michael's College School. From 2000 to 2003 Labinjo played American football at Michigan State University.

Originally recruited as a running back, he moved to linebacker for his sophomore season. He started all 12 games as the strong side linebacker in 2001. As a junior Labinjo played in 12 games, including 8 starts. His senior season, 2003, proved to be his most productive collegiate year. Labinjo was the recipient of the Downtown Coaches Club Award as the outstanding senior on defense, after posting a career-high 94 tackles (58 solos) with five sacks for minus 43 yards and 11.5 stops for losses of 66 yards. He also recovered two fumbles, intercepted three passes and deflected five others.

After graduating from Michigan State University and earning a bachelor's degree in Economics and Finance in December 2003, Labinjo declared for the NFL draft. The linebacker was not drafted by a National Football League franchise, but was selected in the 2003 CFL draft. His rights were selected by the Calgary Stampeders in the 3rd round, as the 25th overall selection.

== Professional career ==
=== National Football League ===
In 2004, Labinjo went to training camp with the Philadelphia Eagles of the NFL and was signed as a linebacker. He appeared in 3 games, totalling 12 tackles (12 solo). 2005 was split between 3 teams: Beginning the season with the Philadelphia Eagles, Labinjo saw action in 5 games, including his only NFL career start, recording 5 tackles (5 solo) along the way. Labinjo was let go in the middle of the 2005 season by Philadelphia. He signed with the Indianapolis Colts for 2 games, registering 2 tackles (1 solo) and half a sack. Ultimately, he ended 2005 with the Miami Dolphins. In 2006, he played behind Miami Dolphins all-pro linebacker Zach Thomas. Labinjo was released by the Dolphins after the 2006 season and was signed by the Indianapolis Colts on March 14, 2007. He was released by the Colts on May 8, 2007.

=== Canadian Football League ===
Labinjo signed with the Calgary Stampeders on July 16, 2007, and he played in six games in his first CFL season before giving way to a season-ending elbow injury. He made two defensive tackles and four special teams tackles.

In the 2008 Calgary Stampeders season, Labinjo recorded 5 sacks, tying him for first on the team with Miguel Robede and Charleston Hughes. With 33 tackles, he was ninth on the Stampeders for tackles. He also had one catch for a one-yard touchdown. In the playoffs, Labinjo had 8 tackles and 3 sacks in the 2008 West Division final, to secure a berth in the 96th Grey Cup game. Labinjo was pivotal in the Stampeders' 22–14 victory over the Montreal Alouettes, registering three tackles, one sack, and four pass deflections.

On January 12, 2011, Labinjo was acquired by the Montreal Alouettes in exchange for future considerations. On January 19, 2011, the Alouettes voided the deal due to concerns about his surgically repaired elbow.

On May 11, 2011, Labinjo was released from his CFL contract with the Calgary Stampeders effectively ending his tenure with the organization.

== Death ==
Labinjo died in his sleep on September 21, 2018, in Calgary at the age of 38. In May 2020, Calgary police revealed that new information led them to classify Labinjo's death as "suspicious."
