= 2003 CFL draft =

Canadian football draft

2003 CFL Draft

General information
- Sport: Canadian football
- Date: April 30
- Time: 11:00 AM EST

Overview
- 53 total selections in 6 rounds
- League: CFL
- First selection: Steve Morley, OL; Calgary Stampeders
- Most selections (11): Calgary Stampeders
- Fewest selections (4): BC Lions; Saskatchewan Roughriders; Winnipeg Blue Bombers
- CIS selections: 32
- NCAA selections: 21

The 2003 CFL draft took place on Wednesday, April 30, 2003. 53 players were chosen for Canadian Football League teams from among the eligible CIS football players from Canadian universities, as well as Canadian players playing in the NCAA. Of the 53 draft selections, 32 players were drafted from Canadian Interuniversity Sport institutions.

Notably, the Calgary Stampeders had the first and second overall picks in the draft, which was only the third time in CFL Draft history that a team had the first two selections in a draft. The Toronto Argonauts were the first to accomplish this via trade in the 1982 CFL draft and the Ottawa Renegades had done this the year before as they were awarded the first and second overall selections as an expansion team in the 2002 CFL draft.

== Trades ==
In the explanations below, (D) denotes trades that took place during the draft, while (PD) indicates trades completed pre-draft. This is a partial list due to references being limited.

=== Round one ===
- Ottawa → Edmonton (PD). Ottawa traded a first-round selection to Edmonton in exchange for Darren Davis.
- Edmonton ←→ Calgary (PD). Edmonton traded the first overall selection and the 43rd overall selection to Calgary in exchange for the fourth overall selection and Deitan Dubuc.
- Toronto → Calgary (PD). Toronto traded the fourth overall selection to Calgary in a trade for the playing rights to Michael Bishop.
- Saskatchewan → Calgary (PD). Saskatchewan traded the fifth overall selection to Calgary in exchange for Travis Moore and Chris Hoople.
- Winnipeg → Calgary (PD). Winnipeg traded the seventh overall selection to Calgary in a trade for Pat Barnes.

=== Round two ===
- Hamilton → Calgary (PD). Hamilton traded a second-round selection to Calgary in exchange for Ryan Ward.

=== Round five ===
- Edmonton → Calgary (PD). Edmonton traded the 43rd overall selection and the first overall selection to Calgary in exchange for the fourth overall selection and Deitan Dubuc.

== Draft order ==
=== Round one ===
= CFL Division All-Star	= CFL All-Star	= Hall of Famer

Pick #	CFL team	Player	Position	School
1	Calgary Stampeders (via Edmonton via Ottawa)	Steve Morley	OL	Saint Mary's
2	Calgary Stampeders	Joe McGrath	OT	Miami
3	Hamilton Tiger-Cats	Julian Radlein	RB	British Columbia
4	Edmonton Eskimos (via Calgary via Toronto)	Emmanuel Casseus	LB	Michigan
5	Calgary Stampeders (via Saskatchewan)	Wes Lysack	DB	Manitoba
6	BC Lions	Paris Jackson	WR	Utah
7	Calgary Stampeders (via Winnipeg)	Marc Calixte	LB	Tennessee (Martin)
8	Edmonton Eskimos	Randy Spencer	DT	Weber State
9	Montreal Alouettes	Andrew Noel	WR	Acadia

=== Round two ===
= CFL Division All-Star	= CFL All-Star	= Hall of Famer

Pick #	CFL team	Player	Position	School
10	Edmonton Eskimos (via Ottawa)	Kojo Aidoo	FB	McMaster
11	Calgary Stampeders	Taylor Robertson	OL	Central Florida
12	Calgary Stampeders (via Hamilton)	Sandro Sciortino	K	Boston College
13	Ottawa Renegades (via Toronto)	Trevor Kine	OT	New Mexico State
14	Montreal Alouettes (via Saskatchewan)	Richard Karikari	CB	St. Francis Xavier
15	BC Lions	Javier Glatt	LB	British Columbia
16	Ottawa Renegades (via Winnipeg)	Louis Hobson	DL	Stanford
17	Ottawa Renegades (via Edmonton)	Israel Idonije	DE	Manitoba
18	Montreal Alouettes	Kerry Carter	RB	Stanford

=== Round three ===
= CFL Division All-Star	= CFL All-Star	= Hall of Famer

Pick #	CFL team	Player	Position	School
19	Ottawa Renegades	Patrick Kabongo	DT	Nebraska
20	Edmonton Eskimos (via Calgary)	Dounia Whitehouse	CB	Charleston Southern
21	Hamilton Tiger-Cats	Kevin Scott	LB	California PA
22	Winnipeg Blue Bombers (via Toronto)	Todd Krenbrink	OL	Regina
23	Saskatchewan Roughriders	Mike McCullough	LB	St. Francis Xavier
24	BC Lions	Carl Gourgues	OL	Laval
25	Calgary Stampeders (via Winnipeg)	Mike Labinjo	DL	Michigan State
26	Edmonton Eskimos	Joseph Bonaventura	LB	Saint Mary's
27	Montreal Alouettes	Matt Brandt	TE	Miami (Ohio)

=== Round four ===
Pick #	CFL team	Player	Position	School
28	Toronto Argonauts (via Ottawa)	Ray Mariuz	LB	McMaster
29	Calgary Stampeders	Hassan Probherbs	WR	Portland State
30	Hamilton Tiger-Cats	Agustin Barrenechea	LB	Calgary
–	Toronto Argonauts	Forfeit pick		
31	Saskatchewan Roughriders	Jim Merrick	OG	McGill
32	Winnipeg Blue Bombers (via Ottawa via BC)	Sebastian Roy	LB	Mount Allison
33	Winnipeg Blue Bombers	Ian Shelswell	DL	Stanford
34	Edmonton Eskimos	Larry Ram	OL	Florida A&M
35	Montreal Alouettes	Paul Archer	OL	Saint Mary's

=== Round five ===
Pick #	CFL team	Player	Position	School
36	Ottawa Renegades	Marc Parenteau	OG	Boston College
37	Calgary Stampeders	Blake Machan	SB	Calgary
38	Hamilton Tiger-Cats	David Kasouf	WR	Holy Cross
39	Toronto Argonauts	Derik Fury	LB	Mount Allison
40	Saskatchewan Roughriders	Mike Thomas	WR	Regina
41	BC Lions	Nicholas Hoffman	FB	McGill
42	Winnipeg Blue Bombers	Cory Olynick	WR	Regina
43	Calgary Stampeders (via Edmonton)	Travis Arnold	OL	Manitoba
44	Montreal Alouettes	Mathieu Bertrand	QB	Laval

=== Round six ===
= CFL Division All-Star	= CFL All-Star	= Hall of Famer

Pick #	CFL team	Player	Position	School
45	Ottawa Renegades	Todd Seely	LB	Ottawa
46	Calgary Stampeders	Greg Schafer	OT	British Columbia
47	Hamilton Tiger-Cats	Erico-Olivier Hakim	FB	Saint Mary's
48	Toronto Argonauts	Michael Palmer	WR	Guelph
49	Saskatchewan Roughriders	Adrian Olenick	OL	Saskatchewan
50	Montreal Alouettes (via BC)	Dave Stala	K	Saint Mary's
51	Montreal Alouettes (via BC via Winnipeg)	Michael Botterill	LB	McMaster
52	Edmonton Eskimos	Didier Ormejuste	DL	Toledo
53	Montreal Alouettes	Ed Becker	K	Wilfrid Laurier
