= Eunice High School =

Public school in Louisiana, United States

Location
- 301 Bobcat Drive; Eunice, Louisiana; United States; 30°29′28.18″N 92°26′26.33″W

Information
- Established: 1906
- School district: St. Landry Parish School Board
- Principal: Irma D. Trosclair
- Teaching staff: 45.91 (FTE)
- Enrollment: 664 (2023–2024)
- Student to teacher ratio: 14.46
- Colors: Green and white
- Mascot: Bobcat
- Nickname: Bobcats
- Rival: Jennings High School (Louisiana)
- Yearbook: The Bobcatter

Eunice High School is a public high school located in Eunice, in the far western end of St. Landry Parish, Louisiana, United States. It is operated by the St. Landry Parish School Board. The address is 301 South Bobcat Drive, Eunice, Louisiana.

== History ==
Eunice High graduated its first class in 1910. The current building was built in 1966. In 1969, St. Landry Parish's former Charles Drew High School for African-American students was merged into Eunice High as part of desegregation.

== Eunice High School athletics ==
Eunice High is a member of the Louisiana High School Athletic Association.

The Eunice High School Battling Bobcats are in District 4-4A and participate in football, baseball, softball, track, basketball, and tennis.

=== State championships ===
- Baseball:1979
- Football:1982, 2018

== Notable alumni ==
- Danneel Ackles (class of 1997), actress
- Kyries Hebert, professional football player
- Derrick Ned, football player
- Keith Ortego, football player
- Tharold Simon, former NFL defensive back, played NCAA football at LSU, drafted by Seattle Seahawks
- Dale Sittig, politician
- Stuart Turner, MLB catcher for Cincinnati Reds
- Summrs, American rapper
