= Tharold Simon =

American football player (born 1991)

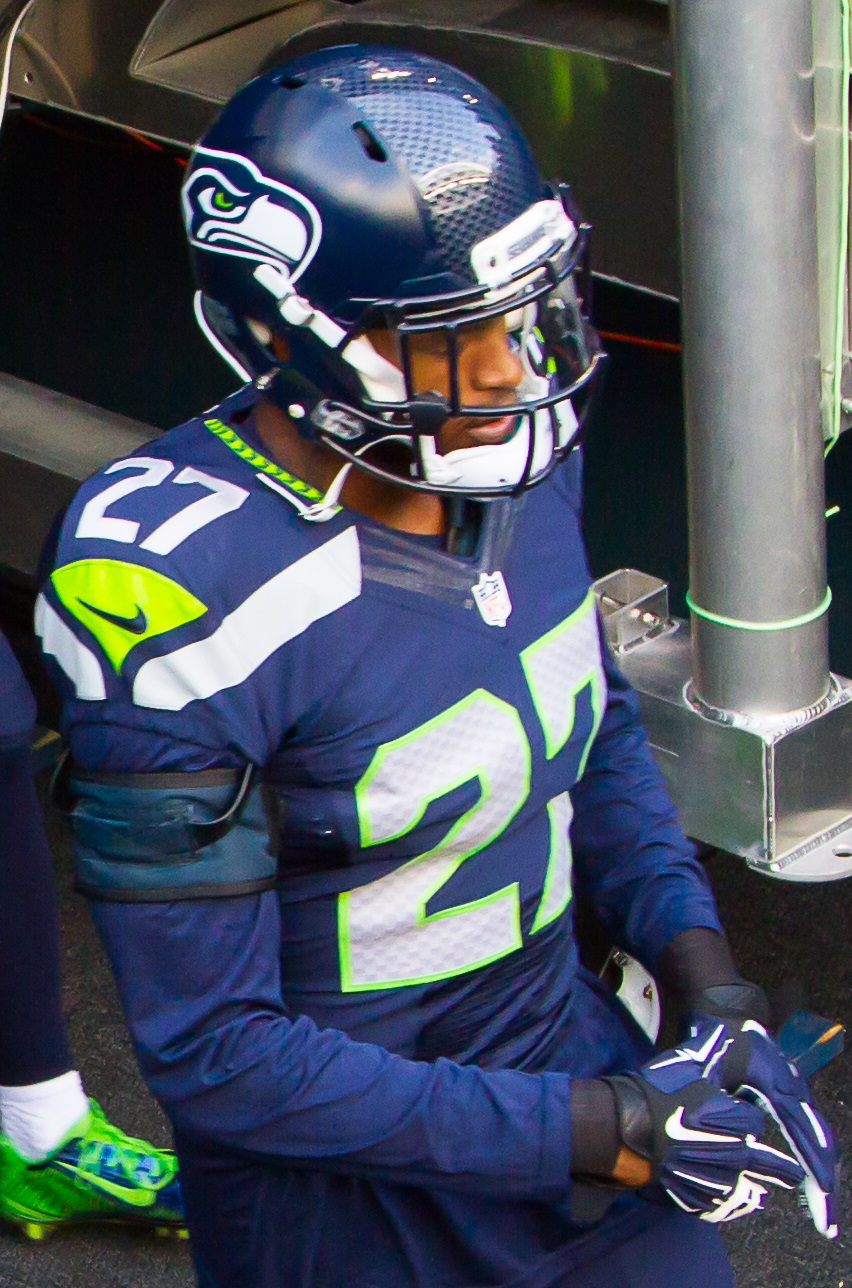
- Simon with the Seattle Seahawks in 2015

No. 27, 29
- Position: Cornerback

Personal information
- Born: March 6, 1991 (age 35); Eunice, Louisiana, U.S.
- Listed height: 6 ft 3 in (1.91 m)
- Listed weight: 202 lb (92 kg)

Career information
- High school: Eunice
- College: LSU
- NFL draft: 2013: 5th round, 138th overall pick

Career history
- Seattle Seahawks (2013–2016); Arizona Cardinals (2016); Washington Redskins (2017)*
- * Offseason or practice squad member only

Awards and highlights
- Super Bowl champion (XLVIII)

Career NFL statistics
- Total tackles: 19
- Pass deflections: 3
- Interceptions: 1
- Stats at Pro Football Reference

Tharold Dwight Simon (born March 6, 1991) is an American former professional football player who was a cornerback in the National Football League (NFL). He was selected by the Seattle Seahawks in the fifth round of the 2013 NFL draft, and was a member of the Seahawks' Super Bowl XLVIII championship team. He played college football for the LSU Tigers.

== Early life ==
Simon was born in Eunice, Louisiana. He attended Eunice High School, and played football, basketball, and ran track for the Eunice Battling Bobcats. He played both receiver and cornerback in high school.

== College career ==
Simon received an athletic scholarship to attend Louisiana State University, where he was a member of coach Les Miles's LSU Tigers football team from 2010 to 2012. He decided to enter the NFL draft after his junior season.

== Professional career ==
=== Seattle Seahawks ===
The Seattle Seahawks chose Simon in the fifth round, with the 138th overall pick, of the 2013 NFL draft. On August 27, 2013, the Seahawks placed Simon on the reserve/physically unable to perform list. The Seahawks won Super Bowl XLVIII after they defeated the Denver Broncos 43–8.

The Seahawks returned to the Super Bowl the following year. On February 1, 2015, in Super Bowl XLIX against the New England Patriots, Simon played much of the game after teammate and starting nickelback Jeremy Lane broke his wrist and tore his ACL. The relatively inexperienced Simon was immediately targeted by the Patriots offense. Simon gave up two touchdown catches, allowed a reception that led to a third, and was repeatedly outmaneuvered by Patriots receivers in a 24-28 loss.

On September 13, 2016, Simon was released by the Seahawks.

=== Arizona Cardinals ===
On September 14, 2016, Simon was claimed off waivers by the Cardinals. He was released by the Cardinals on December 19, 2016.

=== Washington Redskins ===
Simon signed a futures contract with the Washington Redskins on January 16, 2017. On May 15, 2017, he was released by the Redskins.
