= Derrick Ford =

American gridiron football player (born 1979)

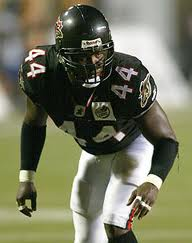
- Ford with the Ottawa Renegades

No. 44
- Position: Defensive end

Personal information
- Born: February 28, 1979 (age 47); Long Beach, California, U.S.
- Listed height: 6 ft 2 in (1.88 m)
- Listed weight: 248 lb (112 kg)

Career information
- College: Arizona State University

Career history
- 2002–2003: Ottawa Renegades
- 2004: Saskatchewan Roughriders

Derrick Ford (born February 28, 1979) is an American former professional football defensive end for the Ottawa Renegades, Saskatchewan Roughriders, and Calgary Stampeders of the Canadian Football League.

== Career ==
He played college football at Arizona State University. He was signed as an undrafted free agent by the Ottawa Renegades. During his time in Ottawa he not only led the team in sacks but became their all-time sack leader in only two years. After the success in the CFL, he signed to play with NFL Europa's Rhein Fire. Then he played in the AF2 with the Stockton Lightning. Ford later played in Finland, in the Vaahteraliiga with the Porvoo Butchers, and with the Kiel Baltic Hurricanes in the German Football League.
