= Josh Ranek =

American gridiron football player (born 1978)

No. 30, 9
- Position: Running back

Personal information
- Born: May 11, 1978 (age 48); Tyndall, South Dakota, U.S.

Career information
- College: South Dakota State

Career history
- 2002–2005: Ottawa Renegades
- 2006: Hamilton Tiger-Cats
- 2007: Edmonton Eskimos
- 2007: Saskatchewan Roughriders

Awards and highlights
- Grey Cup champion (2007); 3× CFL East All-Star (2003, 2004, 2005)

Josh Ranek (born May 11, 1978) is an American former professional football player.

Ranek was a running back in the Canadian Football League (CFL) for the Ottawa Renegades (2002–2005), the Hamilton Tiger-Cats (2006), the Edmonton Eskimos (preseason 2007), and the Saskatchewan Roughriders (November 2007). In 2002, he attended the training camp of the Dallas Cowboys of the National Football League (NFL). Ranek played college football at South Dakota State University.

A term was coined by Chris Walby, color commentator for the CFL broadcasts on CBC, called "Ring around the Ranek" to describe Ranek's power running and his being an integral part to his team. Ranek won the "CFL Player of the Week" award on August 9, 2006 for a win over the Winnipeg Blue Bombers.
