= Marc Calixte =

Canadian football player (born 1978)

No. 37
- Position: Linebacker

Personal information
- Born: September 26, 1978 (age 48); Montreal, Quebec, Canada
- Listed height: 6 ft 0 in (1.83 m)
- Listed weight: 203 lb (92 kg)

Career information
- College: Tennessee-Martin
- CFL draft: 2003: 1st round, 7th overall pick

Career history
- 2003–2012: Calgary Stampeders

Awards and highlights
- Grey Cup champion (2008)
- Stats at CFL.ca (archive)

Marc Calixte (born September 26, 1978) is a Canadian former professional football linebacker who played for the Calgary Stampeders of the Canadian Football League (CFL). He was drafted with the seventh overall pick in the 2003 CFL draft by the Stampeders. He played college football at Tennessee-Martin. Before going to Tennessee-Martin, Marc was a defensive-back at Vanier College. Marc is of Haitian descent.
