= Marc Parenteau =

Canadian football player (born 1980)

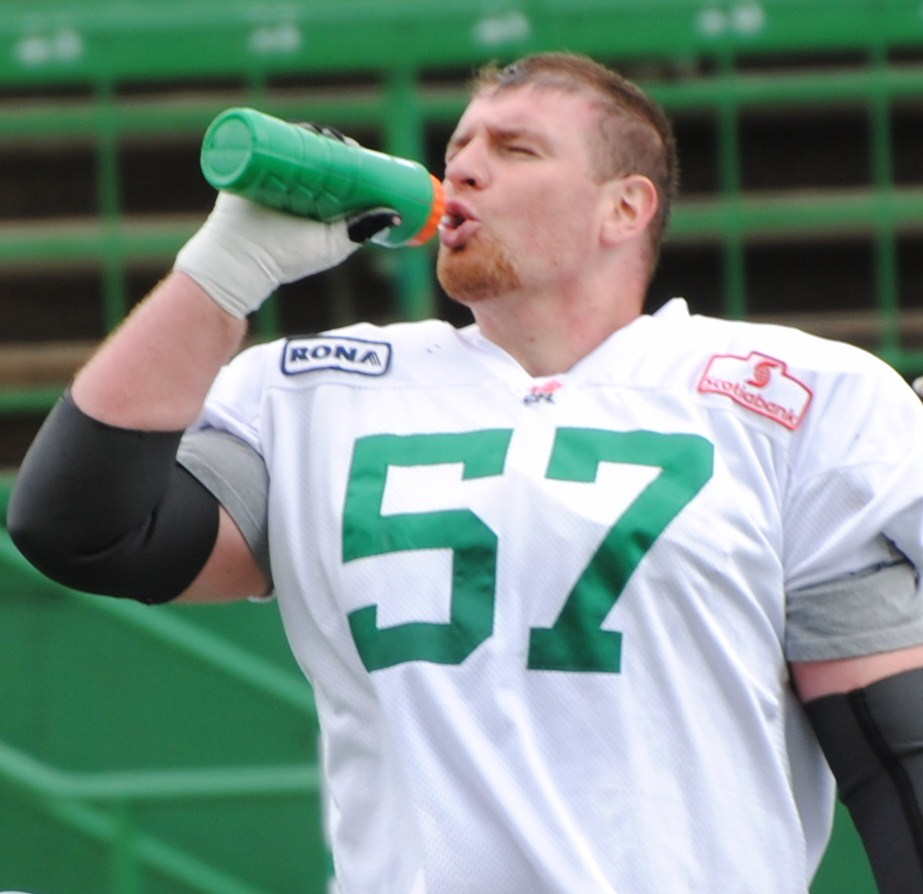
- Parenteau with the Saskatchewan Roughriders in 2010

No. 57
- Position: Offensive lineman

Personal information
- Born: December 4, 1980 (age 45); Sherbrooke, Quebec, Canada
- Listed height: 6 ft 5 in (1.96 m)
- Listed weight: 304 lb (138 kg)

Career information
- College: Boston College
- CFL draft: 2003: 5th round, 36th overall pick

Career history
- 2005: Ottawa Renegades
- 2005–2006: Winnipeg Blue Bombers
- 2007–2011: Saskatchewan Roughriders
- 2012–2013: Toronto Argonauts
- 2013: Winnipeg Blue Bombers

Awards and highlights
- 2× Grey Cup champion (2007, 2012)
- Stats at CFL.ca

Marc Parenteau (born December 4, 1980) is a Canadian former professional football offensive lineman who played in the Canadian Football League (CFL). He was drafted 36th overall by the Ottawa Renegades in the 2003 CFL draft. He was signed by the Saskatchewan Roughriders to a contract on February 12, 2007, where he played in 3 Grey Cup championships (2007 (win), 2009 (loss), 2010 (loss)) and played for five seasons before being released on February 10, 2012. He was soon after signed by the Toronto Argonauts on February 13, 2012 Parenteau quickly established himself as a starter along the offensive line for the Argos and went on to win the 100th Grey Cup with them. On September 9, 2013, Parenteau was traded to the Winnipeg Blue Bombers, along with a 3rd round draft pick in 2014, in exchange for running back Anthony Woodson and a fifth round draft pick in 2014. Due to injuries and to focus on his growing real estate business he retired from the CFL after 9 years in January 2014 after winning 2 Grey Cups (2007 & 2012) and playing in over 140 CFL games. He is the only offensive lineman to ever score a touchdown in a Grey Cup game (2010). Before his CFL career, Marc played his high school football at Cardinal Gibbons High School in Fort Lauderdale (FL) where he was ranked a top 5 offensive lineman in the state in 1999. Marc was also ranked as a top 5 Olympic style wrestler for his high school during his Junior year (1998) but did not wrestle in 1999. After high school he received a football scholarship and attended Boston College from 1999-2003 where he was a 2 time All-Star (All Big East) offensive lineman for the Eagles. He played a reserved role as a true freshman and sophomore at guard and tackle before starting every regular season games and bowl games his Junior and Senior season. He was part of a Boston College football team that played 4 straight bowl games: Insight.com Bowl (1999), Aloha Bowl (2000), Music City Bowl (2001) and Motor City Bowl (2002).
