= Mike McCullough (Canadian football) =

Canadian football player (born 1980)

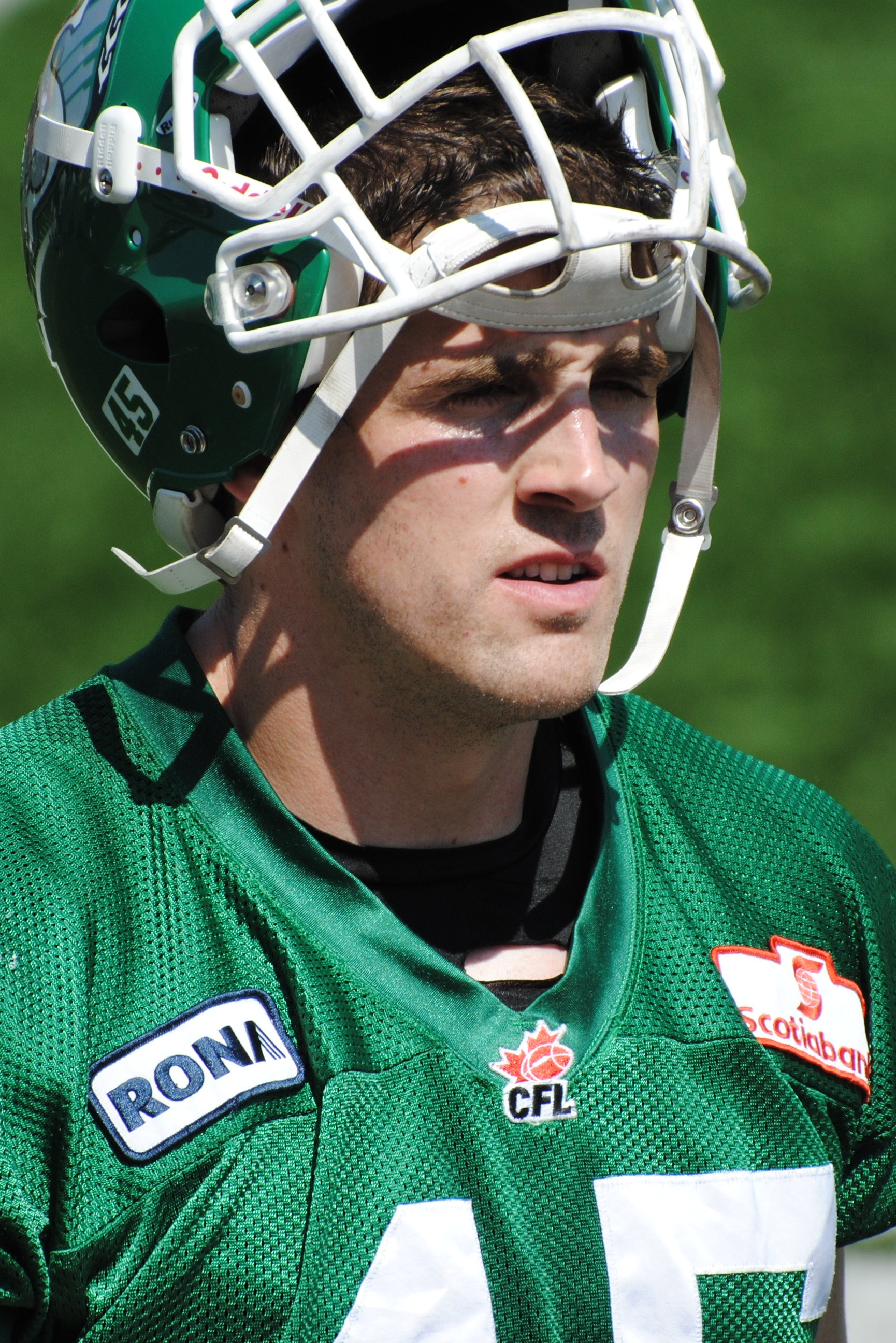
- McCullough with the Saskatchewan Roughriders in 2010

No. 45
- Position: LB

Personal information
- Born: March 17, 1980 (age 46); Oshawa, Ontario, Canada
- Listed height: 6 ft 2 in (1.88 m)
- Listed weight: 230 lb (104 kg)

Career information
- University: St. Francis Xavier
- CFL draft: 2003: 3rd round, 23rd overall pick

Career history
- 2003–2013: Saskatchewan Roughriders

Awards and highlights
- 2× Grey Cup champion (2007, 2013)
- Stats at CFL.ca (archive)

Mike McCullough (born March 17, 1980) is a Canadian former professional football linebacker who played ten seasons for the Saskatchewan Roughriders of the Canadian Football League (CFL). McCullough was drafted by the Roughriders in the third round of the 2003 CFL draft, after playing his college football at St. Francis Xavier University.

== University football ==
McCullough played four seasons for the St. Francis Xavier University X-Men in the Atlantic University Sport Conference. In his senior season, McCullough was named to the conference's defensive all-star team as well as being named an academic all-star.

== Professional football ==
After his university career, McCullough was drafted in the third round with the 23rd overall pick by the Saskatchewan Roughriders in the 2003 CFL draft. He has been a key contributor on special teams, leading the Roughriders in special teams tackles during his rookie season. While with the Roughriders, McCullough has been the recipient of numerous awards for community service, including the club's Mosaic Community Service Award in 2008 and 2009. McCullough was the team's nominee for the Tom Pate Memorial Award in 2009 and 2010, presented by the CFL Player's Association for community service. After the 2010 CFL season, McCullough was awarded the Jake Gaudaur Veterans' Trophy, for being judged as the CFL Player who "best demonstrates the attributes of Canada's veterans in times of war, peace and military conflict."

McCullough would have been a free agent in February 2011 after the 2010 season, but signed a new contract with the team on December 22, 2010.

McCullough eventually went on to win the 101st Grey Cup with Saskatchewan in 2013.

On May 30, 2014, after ten seasons playing in the CFL, McCullough announced retirement.

== Personal life ==
Born March 17, 1980, in Kingston, Ontario, McCullough lives in Regina with his wife Laura and his 4 children: three sons and a daughter. He spends his time with charities, especially with Jesse's Journey, a foundation that funds research into Duchenne muscular dystrophy (DMD), a condition which his son Cole died from in February 2009 after suffering a seizure in his sleep. He began supporting the charity during the 2007 Grey Cup. McCullough was featured on pennants sold by the charity during the 2010 season as a fundraiser.
