= Eunice, Louisiana =

- City
- City of Eunice
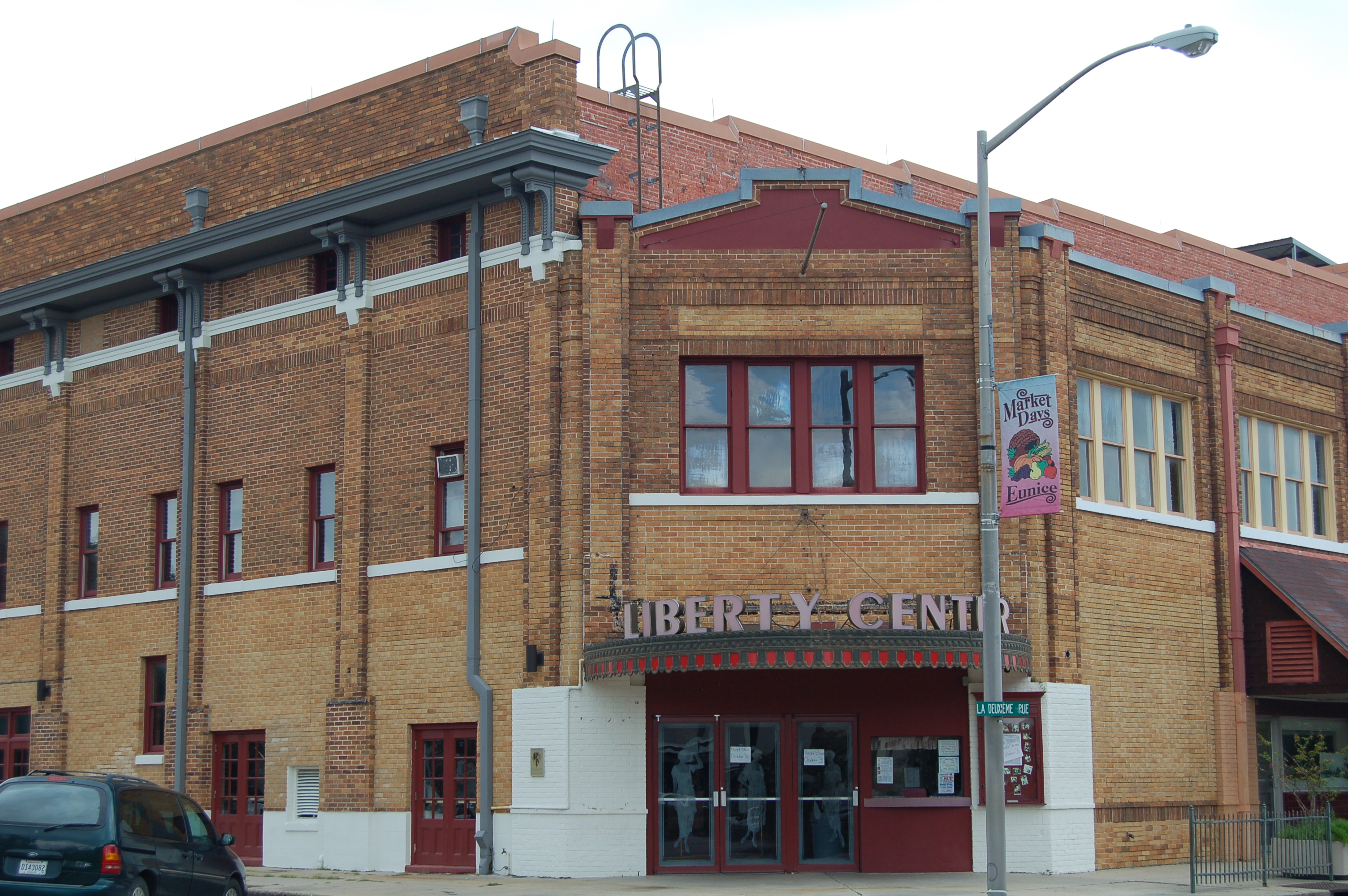
- The Liberty Theatre in Eunice
- Motto: "Louisiana's Prairie Cajun Capital"
- Location of Eunice in St. Landry Parish, Louisiana.

- Location within Louisiana Location within the United States
- Coordinates: 30°29′46″N 92°25′07″W
- Country: United States
- State: Louisiana
- Parishes: Acadia, St. Landry
- Chartered (village): September 12, 1894 (131 years ago)
- Incorporated (town): June 4, 1895 (130 years ago)
- Founder: C.C. Duson
- Named for: Eunice Pharr Duson, wife of C.C. Duson

Area
  - Total: 5.14 sq mi (13.31 km^{2})
  - Land: 5.14 sq mi (13.31 km^{2})
  - Water: 0 sq mi (0.00 km^{2})
- Elevation: 43 ft (13 m)

Population (2020)
  - Total: 9,422
  - Density: 1,833.9/sq mi (708.09/km^{2})
- Time zone: UTC-6 (CST)
  - Summer (DST): UTC-5 (CDT)
- ZIP code: 70535
- Area code: 337
- FIPS code: 22-24565
- GNIS feature ID: 2403577
- Website: Eunice, Louisiana

Eunice is a city in Acadia and St. Landry parishes in the U.S. state of Louisiana. As of the 2020 census, Eunice had a population of 9,422.

The St. Landry Parish portion of Eunice is part of the Opelousas–Eunice Micropolitan Statistical Area, while the Acadia Parish portion is part of the Crowley Micropolitan Statistical Area.

== History ==
One-time lawman and pioneer land developer C.C. Duson is credited with founding Eunice, which was named for his second wife, Eunice Pharr Duson. He and his brother, W.W. Duson, had already founded Crowley, Louisiana in 1887, and he looked to the north of the parish for future development. Duson bought 160 acres (0.65 km^{2}) of land from Willie Humble of Prairie Faquetaïque and mapped out a town site, laid out in lots 50-by-140 feet, 12 lots to the block. Next, he persuaded the Southern Pacific Railroad to extend a branch line from Crowley to his new town. Then he began what he and his brother had learned how to do as well as anyone: promote land sales. It was chartered as a village on September 12, 1894, and incorporated as a town on June 4, 1895.

Evangeline Parish was created with the passage of a bill in June 1908. Eunice and Ville Platte were in competition for the parish seat, and Ville Platte was selected by voters on April 12, 1909. After the election, Eunice declared it would remain in St. Landry Parish.

In May 2000 a chemical freight train derailed in Eunice, spilling numerous hazardous chemicals and causing about 15 tank cars to explode and burn; approximately 3,500 residents of the town were evacuated for as many as five days. Over 10,000 residents settled in May 2004 for $65 million with the Union Pacific Corporation in a class action suit, claiming that the corporation had failed to repair a defective section of track.

== Geography ==
According to the United States Census Bureau, the city has a total area of 4.7 square miles (12.1 km^{2}), all land.

Louisiana Highway 13 and U.S. Highway 190 pass through the center of Eunice with U.S. 190 heading west 26 miles (42 km) to Kinder and east 21 miles (34 km) to Opelousas, the seat of St. Landry Parish. LA-13 heads north 11 miles (18 km) to Mamou and south 20 miles (32 km) to Crowley, the seat of Acadia Parish.

=== Climate ===
The climate in this area is characterized by hot, humid summers and generally mild to cool winters. According to the Köppen Climate Classification system, Eunice has a humid subtropical climate, abbreviated "Cfa" on climate maps.

Climate data for Eunice, Louisiana (1991–2020 normals, extremes 1982–2015)
Month	Jan	Feb	Mar	Apr	May	Jun	Jul	Aug	Sep	Oct	Nov	Dec	Year
Record high °F (°C)	84 (29)	83 (28)	88 (31)	94 (34)	101 (38)	103 (39)	104 (40)	107 (42)	109 (43)	98 (37)	89 (32)	84 (29)	109 (43)
Mean maximum °F (°C)	77.4 (25.2)	79.0 (26.1)	83.8 (28.8)	88.7 (31.5)	93.8 (34.3)	97.6 (36.4)	99.1 (37.3)	100.6 (38.1)	97.9 (36.6)	92.0 (33.3)	84.6 (29.2)	79.0 (26.1)	101.3 (38.5)
Mean daily maximum °F (°C)	59.9 (15.5)	64.2 (17.9)	71.2 (21.8)	77.6 (25.3)	84.7 (29.3)	90.2 (32.3)	92.0 (33.3)	93.0 (33.9)	88.9 (31.6)	80.7 (27.1)	70.0 (21.1)	62.5 (16.9)	77.9 (25.5)
Daily mean °F (°C)	49.9 (9.9)	54.2 (12.3)	60.9 (16.1)	67.2 (19.6)	75.2 (24.0)	80.8 (27.1)	82.6 (28.1)	82.9 (28.3)	78.4 (25.8)	69.0 (20.6)	59.2 (15.1)	52.2 (11.2)	67.7 (19.8)
Mean daily minimum °F (°C)	39.8 (4.3)	44.2 (6.8)	50.6 (10.3)	56.9 (13.8)	65.6 (18.7)	71.3 (21.8)	73.2 (22.9)	72.8 (22.7)	67.8 (19.9)	57.2 (14.0)	48.4 (9.1)	41.9 (5.5)	57.5 (14.2)
Mean minimum °F (°C)	24.8 (−4.0)	28.8 (−1.8)	33.1 (0.6)	41.2 (5.1)	52.0 (11.1)	64.5 (18.1)	69.2 (20.7)	67.6 (19.8)	55.5 (13.1)	41.0 (5.0)	31.7 (−0.2)	27.5 (−2.5)	23.1 (−4.9)
Record low °F (°C)	14 (−10)	15 (−9)	23 (−5)	34 (1)	41 (5)	53 (12)	62 (17)	58 (14)	44 (7)	30 (−1)	25 (−4)	9 (−13)	9 (−13)
Average precipitation inches (mm)	6.43 (163)	4.62 (117)	3.91 (99)	4.62 (117)	5.69 (145)	4.84 (123)	4.61 (117)	4.24 (108)	4.90 (124)	4.86 (123)	4.43 (113)	4.79 (122)	57.94 (1,472)
Average snowfall inches (cm)	0.0 (0.0)	0.0 (0.0)	0.0 (0.0)	0.0 (0.0)	0.0 (0.0)	0.0 (0.0)	0.0 (0.0)	0.0 (0.0)	0.0 (0.0)	0.0 (0.0)	0.0 (0.0)	0.0 (0.0)	0.0 (0.0)
Average precipitation days (≥ 0.01 in)	10.1	8.7	7.9	6.8	6.8	10.7	10.6	8.9	7.0	6.3	7.5	9.0	100.3
Average snowy days (≥ 0.1 in)	0.0	0.0	0.0	0.0	0.0	0.0	0.0	0.0	0.0	0.0	0.0	0.0	0.0
Source: NOAA

=== Parish ===
Eunice is in parts of three parishes, St. Landry, Acadia and Evangeline. Thus, the names of certain businesses in Eunice, such as Tri-Parish Bank. Most of the Evangeline Parish portion of Eunice is unincorporated.

=== St. Landry ===
Most of the city limits are located in St. Landry parish. This was one of the original parishes in Louisiana.

=== Acadia Parish ===
Acadia to the south actually borders most of the southern city limits, in a close west to east parallel line, with Sittig Street in the center, parish road 7–23 to the east, and both just inside the St. Landry Parish. On the west side the city limits drops south following highway 755 south and includes the airport, the Louisiana State University Eunice campus, as well as the streets around the campus. Acadia Parish also succeeded from the parish of St. Landry.

== Demographics ==
Historical population
Census	Pop.	Note	%±
1900	316		—
1910	1,684		432.9%
1920	3,272		94.3%
1930	3,597		9.9%
1940	5,242		45.7%
1950	8,184		56.1%
1960	11,326		38.4%
1970	11,390		0.6%
1980	12,479		9.6%
1990	11,162		−10.6%
2000	11,499		3.0%
2010	10,398		−9.6%
2020	9,422		−9.4%
2025 (est.)	9,035	▼	−4.1%
U.S. Decennial Census

Eunice racial composition
Race	Number	Percentage
White (non-Hispanic)	5,448	57.82%
Black or African American (non-Hispanic)	3,289	34.91%
Native American	12	0.13%
Asian	89	0.94%
Other/Mixed	312	3.31%
Hispanic or Latino	272	2.89%

As of the 2020 United States census, there were 9,422 people, 3,642 households, and 2,470 families residing in the city. As of the 2010 United States census, there were 10,398 people living in the city. The racial makeup of the city was 63.0% White, 32.5% Black, 0.3% Native American, 0.6% Asian, 0.2% from some other race and 1.2% from two or more races. 2.3% were Hispanic or Latino of any race.

As of the census of 2000, there were 11,499 people, 4,316 households, and 2,986 families living in the city. The population density was 2,459.6 inhabitants per square mile (949.7/km^{2}). There were 4,675 housing units at an average density of 1,000.0 per square mile (386.1/km^{2}). The racial makeup of the city was 68.76% White, 29.91% African American, 0.11% Native American, 0.21% Asian, 0.02% Pacific Islander, 0.34% from other races, and 0.65% from two or more races. Hispanic or Latino of any race were 1.11% of the population.

There were 4,316 households, out of which 34.8% had children under the age of 18 living with them, 47.0% were married couples living together, 17.5% had a female householder with no husband present, and 30.8% were non-families. 27.4% of all households were made up of individuals, and 12.3% had someone living alone who was 65 years of age or older. The average household size was 2.59 and the average family size was 3.18.

In the city, the population was spread out, with 29.6% under the age of 18, 10.0% from 18 to 24, 24.1% from 25 to 44, 20.8% from 45 to 64, and 15.5% who were 65 years of age or older. The median age was 35 years, a half year older than the statewide median age of 34.0 years. For every 100 females, there were 89.0 males. For every 100 females age 18 and over, there were 82.5 males.

The median income for a household in the city was $21,372, and the median income for a family was $27,173. Males had a median income of $29,500 versus $18,912 for females. The per capita income for the city was $11,937. About 26.5% of families and 31.4% of the population were below the poverty line, including 41.9% of those under age 18 and 20.6% of those age 65 or over.

== Arts and culture ==
Located near the heart of Cajun country, Eunice is famous for its Cajun music, and in November 1997 the Cajun Music Hall of Fame and Museum was founded there. The City of Eunice and the National Park Service sponsor "Laissez les bons temps rouler au rendezvous des cajuns", a live Cajun music show every Saturday night at the Liberty Theatre, an old movie theater that was restored by a "coup de main" by local volunteers after falling into disrepair.

Eunice is home to the Prairie Acadian Cultural Center, a unit of Jean Lafitte National Historical Park and Preserve.

Eunice is host to one of the largest Courir de Mardi Gras (traditional rural French Louisiana Mardi Gras observance,) as well as the World Championship Crawfish Étouffée Cook-off.

In 2015, The Eunice Rotary Club and the Jean Lafitte National Park and Preserve teamed up to host a revitalized folklife festival known as the Experience Louisiana Festival held each October on the campus of LSU Eunice.

== Education ==
Eunice is the home of Louisiana State University Eunice, a community college, and a campus of Louisiana State University.

Eunice is also home to both Eunice High School and St Edmund High School.

== Notable people ==
- Danneel Ackles (nee Harris), actress, grew up in Eunice after birth in Lafayette
- Kenneth Atchity, Scholar and film producer.
- Geno Delafose, Zydeco musician
- Mary Alice Fontenot, author of "Clovis the Crawfish" series of books
- Joe Hall, accordionist playing Creole la la, Cajun, and zydeco styles
- Kyries Hebert, American football free safety from the NFL's Cincinnati Bengals
- Deante Adam Johnson (Summrs), Music artist, grew up in Eunice after birth in Lafayette
- C.W. Lemoine, Author and Air Force aviator.
- Carlton Loewer, Major League Baseball pitcher
- Dennis McGee, Cajun musician
- Keith Ortego, American football wide receiver for the Super Bowl XX champion Chicago Bears
- Ann Savoy, Cajun accordionist
- Marc Savoy, Cajun accordionist and accordion maker
- Summrs, rapper and progenitor of the pluggnb subgenre
- Tharold Simon, NFL cornerback for the Seattle Seahawks
- Dale Sittig, politician
- Cora Kelley Ward, painter
- Jay Young, television news anchor

== See also ==
- Music of Louisiana
- List of Notable People Related to Cajun Music
