= Kyries Hebert =

American gridiron football player (born 1980)

No. 33, 23, 34, 21
- Positions: Safety, Linebacker

Personal information
- Born: October 9, 1980 (age 46); Eunice, Louisiana, U.S.
- Listed height: 6 ft 3 in (1.91 m)
- Listed weight: 220 lb (100 kg)

Career information
- High school: Eunice
- College: Louisiana-Lafayette
- NFL draft: 2002: undrafted

Career history
- 2002: Minnesota Vikings*
- 2002: Houston Texans
- 2004–2005: Ottawa Renegades
- 2005: Tampa Bay Buccaneers*
- 2006–2007: Winnipeg Blue Bombers
- 2008–2009: Cincinnati Bengals
- 2010: Hamilton Tiger-Cats
- 2012–2017: Montreal Alouettes
- 2018: Ottawa Redblacks
- * Offseason or practice squad member only

Awards and highlights
- Tom Pate Memorial Award (2013); James P. McCaffrey Trophy (2017); CFL All-Star (2012); 2× CFL East All-Star (2012, 2017); Second-team All-Sun Belt (2001)

Career CFL statistics
- Tackles: 800
- Sacks: 30
- INTs: 12
- Stats at CFL.ca
- Stats at Pro Football Reference

Kyries Hebert (/ˈkaɪrɪs ˈeɪbɛr/ KY-riss AI-bair; born October 9, 1980) is an American former professional football player who was a safety for the Cincinnati Bengals of the National Football League (NFL). He was originally signed by the Minnesota Vikings as an undrafted free agent in 2002. He played college football at Louisiana-Lafayette. Hebert also played linebacker in the Canadian Football League (CFL).

== Early life ==
Hebert attended Eunice High School in Eunice, Louisiana and was a letterman in football, basketball, and track & field. In track & field, he set the school record in the high jump.

== College career ==
He attended college in Lafayette, Louisiana where he was a standout defensive back for the University of Louisiana at Lafayette Ragin' Cajuns. In each of his three seasons between 1999 and 2001 he led the team in tackles made. He also played in every game during this period.

== Professional career ==
=== Minnesota Vikings ===
In April 2002, Hebert signed with the Minnesota Vikings. He was released in September at the end of training camp.

=== Houston Texans ===
Hebert was signed by the Houston Texans and was on the active roster for their final game of the 2002 season. He was released by the Texans in 2003.

=== Ottawa Renegades ===
Hebert then moved up north to Canada where he played in the 2004 and 2005 seasons with the Ottawa Renegades of the Canadian Football League (CFL). He quickly became one of the most feared hitters and Special Teams players in the CFL. In December 2005, Hebert signed a controversial five-year contract with Ottawa that would have made him one of the highest paid defensive players in the CFL. However, the Ottawa organization folded, and it appeared that Hebert was going to become a free agent and eligible to pursue the NFL. Hebert played in 34 games for the Renegades, in 2 seasons with the club. Hebert had 122 tackles, 57 special teams tackles, 1 sack, 5 interceptions, 2 fumble recoveries and scored 3 defensive touchdowns.

=== Winnipeg Blue Bombers ===
In April 2006, the Winnipeg Blue Bombers claimed Hebert off waivers from Ottawa just as Hebert was about to sign a new contract with the Cincinnati Bengals. After appealing the claim with the CFL Players Association, Hebert agreed to a settlement contract for two years with Winnipeg. In the 2007 season, Hebert led defense helped Winnipeg reach the Grey Cup. He played 33 games for the Blue Bombers over 2 seasons and made 86 tackles, 45 special teams tackles, with 7 sacks, 3 interceptions and 3 fumble recoveries.

=== Cincinnati Bengals ===
On December 31, 2007, Hebert signed a two-year contract with the Cincinnati Bengals. He was released by the Bengals on September 4, 2010.

=== Hamilton Tiger-Cats ===
On October 20, 2010, he signed with the Hamilton Tiger-Cats (CFL). He played in two games making 4 tackles.

He was released during the following off-season on March 29, 2011.

=== Montreal Alouettes ===
On May 7, 2012, Hebert signed with the Montreal Alouettes (CFL). Hebert had strong 2012 and 2013 CFL seasons with the Alouettes. He contributed 48 tackles, 27 special teams tackles, 3 sacks and 2 interceptions in 2012; good enough to make him a CFL All-Star at the safety position. His 2013 season was arguably even more impressive as he set a career-high in tackles and sacks with 68 and 9 respectively. Despite this he was not recognized as an All-Star. On February 10, 2014, one day before the start of free-agency, Hebert signed a 3-year contract with the Alouettes. On June 28, 2014, Hebert struck reigning Most Outstanding Player Jon Cornish with a brutal, illegal high tackle, resulting in Cornish sustaining a severe concussion. Hebert received the maximum fine for the hit while Cornish never fully regained his health, forcing him to retire at the end of the 2015 season due to the injury. Hebert missed half of the 2015 season with an ankle injury. Kyries Hebert played a full season in 2016 and set a career-high in tackles with 78. Hebert broke his 2016 record the following season, cracking the 100 tackle mark, finishing third in the league with 110. In September 2016, Hebert was fined for a hit to the head of Brendan Gillanders. On August 15, 2017, Hebert again received the maximum fine for an illegal hit on Argos QB, Cody Fajardo. After the Alouettes made a series of additions on defensive at the start of 2018 free agency Hebert, age 37 at the time, requested his release; which was granted by the Als on February 16, 2018.

=== Ottawa Redblacks ===
Only a couple hours after being released by the Alouettes Hebert signed with the Ottawa Redblacks (CFL). Hebert had played in Ottawa with the Renegades from 2004 to 2005. On June 29, 2018, Hebert received a one-game suspension for a dangerous hit to the head of Calgary Stampeders receiver DaVaris Daniels. Hebert was suspended again in early September 2018 after another dangerous hit, this time on Alouettes receiver B.J. Cunningham. He played 11 games for the Redblacks in 2018 and contributed with 51 tackles, two sacks and a forced fumble/recovery. Following the season in December 2018 the Redblacks informed Hebert that they would not be re-signing him, and that he would become a free agent in February 2019.

== Philanthropy ==
On July 15, 2010, Hebert founded Ky Cares Foundation Inc. The mission of the foundation is to facilitate the relentless pursuit of success in the face of adversity so that youth may know that a person's circumstances do not dictate his or her destiny. They hold a yearly event where proceeds benefit struggling schools in Acadiana areas through scholarships and monetary donations. Past celebrity participants include Terrell Owens and Roman Harper.

Hebert was the 2013 recipient of the prestigious Tom Pate Memorial Award. This honor goes to the player who demonstrates "outstanding sportsmanship and someone who has made a significant contribution to his team, his community and Association."
