= Kelly Wiltshire =

Canadian gridiron football player (born 1972)

No. 1,26,31
- Positions: Defensive back, Linebacker

Personal information
- Born: June 28, 1972 (age 54); Montreal, Quebec, Canada
- Listed height: 6 ft 0 in (1.83 m)
- Listed weight: 202 lb (92 kg)

Career information
- College: James Madison
- CFL draft: 1996: 1st round, 2nd overall pick

Career history
- 1996: Jacksonville Jaguars*
- 1997–1999: Toronto Argonauts
- 2000–2001: Montreal Alouettes
- 2002–2004: Ottawa Renegades
- 2005–2006: Edmonton Eskimos
- * Offseason or practice squad member only

Awards and highlights
- 2× Grey Cup champion (1997, 2005); 2× CFL All-Star (1998, 2003); Eskimos' Most Outstanding Canadian Player (2005)
- Stats at CFL.ca

Kelly K. Wiltshire (born June 28, 1972) is a Canadian former professional football linebacker who played ten seasons in the Canadian Football League (CFL) from 1997 to 2006 for four teams. He was a CFL All-Star twice.

Early life

Wiltshire attended Vanier College (St-Laurent, Quebec) where he won the 1991 Bol d'Or. He was also a member of the Team Quebec U18 football team. His Vanier teammates who were also drafted in the 1996 CFL draft included Andrew Henry (4th overall), Ferrell Duclair (8th overall) and Tom Monios (12th overall).

College Career

Wiltshire attended James Madison University (VA) from 1993 from1996, where he started at cornerback. A vital member of the team, he was an All-Yankee conference selection and 3rd Team All American.

Professional career

Wiltshire was the second overall pick of the 1996 CFL draft. He was selected by the Toronto Argonauts where he played for three seasons and earned All star and Outstanding Canadian accolades.

He then played for his hometown Montreal Alouettes, where he participated in the 2000 Cup game; losing the game.

Wiltshire then played for the Ottawa Renegades from 2002-2004, having been picked first overall in the expansion draft. Where he broke many tackling records playing the Team's Nickelback/Rover position.

Finally, Wiltshire played for the Edmonton Eskimos from 2005-2006 capturing another Grey cup.

Wiltshire was a team captain and Outstanding Canadian on all four CFL teams he played for, he also was a player representative during his tenure.

During his playing career, Wiltshire set the CFL record for most consecutive games played in the regular season with 157. His ironman streak ended on September 30, 2005 when he was unable to play in a game for the Edmonton Eskimos against the Calgary Stampeders due to an injury.

As of 2010, Wiltshire is an officer with the Ontario Provincial Police. He is currently an instructor at the Provincial Police Academy. While he was member of the Team Quebec U18 football team both of his boys have made the Team Ontario team.
