= Deitan Dubuc =

Canadian football player (born 1977)

No. 89
- Position: Tight end

Personal information
- Born: February 4, 1977 (age 49); Montreal, Quebec, Canada
- Listed height: 6 ft 4 in (1.93 m)
- Listed weight: 248 lb (112 kg)

Career information
- CEGEP: Cégep du Vieux Montréal
- College: Michigan (1998–2002)
- CFL draft: 2002: 2nd round, 14th overall pick

Career history
- Seattle Seahawks (2003)*; Carolina Panthers (2003)*; Houston Texans (2004)*; Edmonton Eskimos (2005–2006)
- * Offseason or practice squad member only

Awards and highlights
- Grey Cup champion (2005)

Deitan Dubuc (born February 4, 1977) is a Canadian former professional football tight end who played for the Edmonton Eskimos of the Canadian Football League (CFL). He played college football for the Michigan Wolverines.

== Early life ==
Deitan Dubuc was born on February 4, 1977, in Montreal, Quebec, Canada. He attended Lavar High School and played CEGEP football at Cégep du Vieux Montréal. He caught 30 passes for five touchdowns in 1996.

== College career ==
In July 1997, Dubuc committed to the University of Michigan to play college football for the Wolverines. He redshirted the 1998 season. He played in six games in 1999, catching one pass for 23 yards, but did not earn a varsity letter. Dubuc was a three-year letterman from 2000 to 2002. He appeared in 11 games during the 2001 season, recording three receptions for 28 yards and one touchdown. He played in all 13 games as a senior in 2002, catching one pass for nine yards.

== Professional career ==
Dubuc was selected by the Calgary Stampeders in the second round, with the 14th overall pick, of the 2002 CFL draft. On April 29, 2003, the Stampeders traded Dubuc's rights and the No. 4 pick in the 2003 CFL draft to the Edmonton Eskimos for the first overall pick in the 2003 draft.

After going undrafted in the 2003 NFL draft, Dubuc signed with the Seattle Seahawks on May 13, 2003. He was waived on September 1 but signed to Seattle's practice squad the next day. Dubuc was waived again on September 30, 2003.

Dubuc was signed to the Carolina Panthers' practice squad on October 1, 2003. He became a free agent after the season, and re-signed with the Panthers on February 11, 2004. He was waived on August 3, 2004.

Dubuc was claimed off waivers by the Houston Texans on August 4, 2004. He was waived/injured on August 16 and reverted to injured reserve the next day. He was released by the Texans on August 20, 2004.

On February 17, 2005, Dubuc signed with the Eskimos. He dressed in 13 games for Edmonton during the 2005 season, catching three passes on four targets for 32 yards while also posting one tackle on defense and four tackles on special teams. On November 27, 2005, the Eskimos won the 93rd Grey Cup against the Montreal Alouettes by a score of 38–35. Dubuc dressed in 15 games in 2006, catching no passes on two targets and recording seven tackles on special teams. He was released on June 25, 2007.

== Personal life ==
Dubuc became a police officer in Minneapolis after his football career. During this career he became notible for coordinating with Jake Lang for a racist protest at the capitol in which he gave his approval to Jake Lang and crew for dressing in riot gear. Jake was later arrested for rioting but the charges were dismissed due to his coordination with Dubuc before the riot.
