= Jimmy Oliver (Canadian football) =

American football player (born 1973)

Jimmy Oliver (born July 30, 1973) is an American former professional football player who was a wide receiver in the Canadian Football League (CFL) for the BC Lions, Ottawa Renegades, and Toronto Argonauts. He played college football for the TCU Horned Frogs. He was selected by the San Diego Chargers in the second round (61st overall) of the 1995 NFL draft. In the NFL he was with the Chargers and the Dallas Cowboys but never played in a game for them.

Oliver was also an All-American sprinter for the TCU Horned Frogs track and field team, finishing runner-up in the 4 × 100 metres relay at the 1993 NCAA Division I Outdoor Track and Field Championships.

== Pro Career ==
=== NFL ===
Oliver was drafted by the San Diego Chargers in the 2nd Round (61st overall) of the 1995 NFL draft. He spent the 1995 and 1996 seasons on the injured reserve and then was released by the Chargers in July of 1997. He was signed and released by the Dallas Cowboys the next season, ending his NFL career without him ever playing in a game.

=== CFL ===
The following winter he was signed by the BC Lions. He played in 4 games that season, recording 13 receptions for 200 yards. He played two more seasons with the Lions, playing in 11 games and recording 39 receptions for 797 yards and 3 touchdowns. He also returned 2 kickoffs. In 2000 he was a part of the Lions team that won the 88th Grey Cup.

He spent the 2002 season with the Ottawa Renegades, which was his best season. He played in all 188 games, had 82 receptions and caught for 1004 yards and 6 touchdowns. He also had a single punt return. At the end of the season he became a free agent and signed with the Toronto Argonauts.

He played in only 3 games with Toronto, caught 7 passes for 85 yards and was released before the season was over.
