= Prairie Faquetaïque =

Prairie in the U.S. state of Louisiana

Coordinates: 30.459°N 92.442°W

Prairie Faquetaïque is a prairie in the U.S. state of Louisiana.

Faquetaïque is a name derived from the Choctaw language meaning "turkey hen".
