= Anthony Collier =

American football player (born 1979)

No. 95, 97
- Position: Defensive end

Personal information
- Born: November 11, 1979 (age 46); Dallas, Texas, U.S.
- Listed height: 6 ft 4 in (1.93 m)
- Listed weight: 260 lb (118 kg)

Career information
- High school: Adamson (Dallas)
- College: Baylor
- NFL draft: 2003: undrafted

Career history
- Ottawa Renegades (2004–2005); Edmonton Eskimos (2006)*; Hamilton Tiger-Cats (2006–2007)
- * Offseason or practice squad member only

Awards and highlights
- CFL East All-Star (2005)

Anthony Dewayne Bernard "A.C." Collier (born November 11, 1979) is an American former professional football defensive end who played in the Canadian Football League (CFL) with the Ottawa Renegades and Hamilton Tiger-Cats. He played college football at Baylor.

== Early life ==
Anthony Dewayne Bernard Collier was born on November 11, 1979, in Dallas, Texas. His main focus growing up was basketball. He starting playing football at W. H. Adamson High School in Dallas. Collier was a two-way starter at defensive end and tight end. He received interest from Arkansas, Oklahoma, Northwestern, Kansas State, TCU, and New Mexico. However, he instead decided to attend the United States Military Academy Preparatory School at West Point, New York, where he underwent basic training.

== College career ==
Collier left West Point, and decided to start his college football career at Tyler Junior College, where he was a two-year starter. He received first-team all-conference and second-team All-American honors while at Tyler. After his junior college career, he received offers from Iowa State, New Mexico, Kansas, Illinois, and Arizona. Collier originally committed to Iowa State but switched to Baylor. He was a two-year letterman for the Baylor Bears from 2001 to 2002.

== Professional career ==
Collier went undrafted in the 2003 NFL draft. He signed with the Ottawa Renegades of the Canadian Football League (CFL) in January 2004. He spent most of the 2004 CFL season on the practice roster but did dress for three games, posting five tackles on defense, one special teams tackle, and two forced fumbles. On July 8, 2005, against the BC Lions, Collier, starting in place of the injured Kai Ellis, tied a CFL single-game record with five sacks. Collier dressed in 13 games overall in 2005, totaling 21 tackles on defense, two special teams tackles, 12 sacks, two fumble recoveries, three interceptions for 55 yards, and three pass breakups. He was named a CFL East All-Star for his performance during the 2005 season.

On April 12, 2006, Collier was selected by the Edmonton Eskimos in the 2006 CFL dispersal draft. He was released by Edmonton on June 11, 2006.

Collier signed with the Hamilton Tiger-Cats of the CFL on June 22, 2006. On August 4, 2006, he made his first start for the Tiger-Cats in relief of the injured James Cotton. Collier dressed in 11 games overall during the 2006 season, recording five tackles on defense, three special teams tackles, five sacks, two forced fumbles, one fumble recovery, and two pass breakups. He dressed in three games in 2007 before being released in early August 2007.
