= Julian Radlein =

Canadian football player (born 1981)

Profile
- Position: Fullback

Personal information
- Born: February 6, 1981 (age 45); Kingston, Jamaica
- Listed height: 6 ft 2 in (1.88 m)
- Listed weight: 245 lb (111 kg)

Career information
- University: UBC
- CFL draft: 2003: 1st round, 3rd overall pick

Career history
- 2003–2007: Hamilton Tiger-Cats (CFL)

Awards and highlights
- Frank M. Gibson Trophy (2003); CFLPA All-Star (2004)

Julian Radlein (born February 6, 1981) is a former Canadian Football League (CFL) fullback who played for the Hamilton Tiger-Cats. He attended Lincoln Heights Public School and Bluevale Collegiate Institute in Waterloo, Ontario.

In 2003, Radlein won the Frank M. Gibson trophy for being the outstanding rookie in the CFL East Division. Radlein was a CFLPA All-Star in the following season. He retired prior to the 2008 season.
