= Kerry Joseph =

American gridiron football player and coach (born 1973)

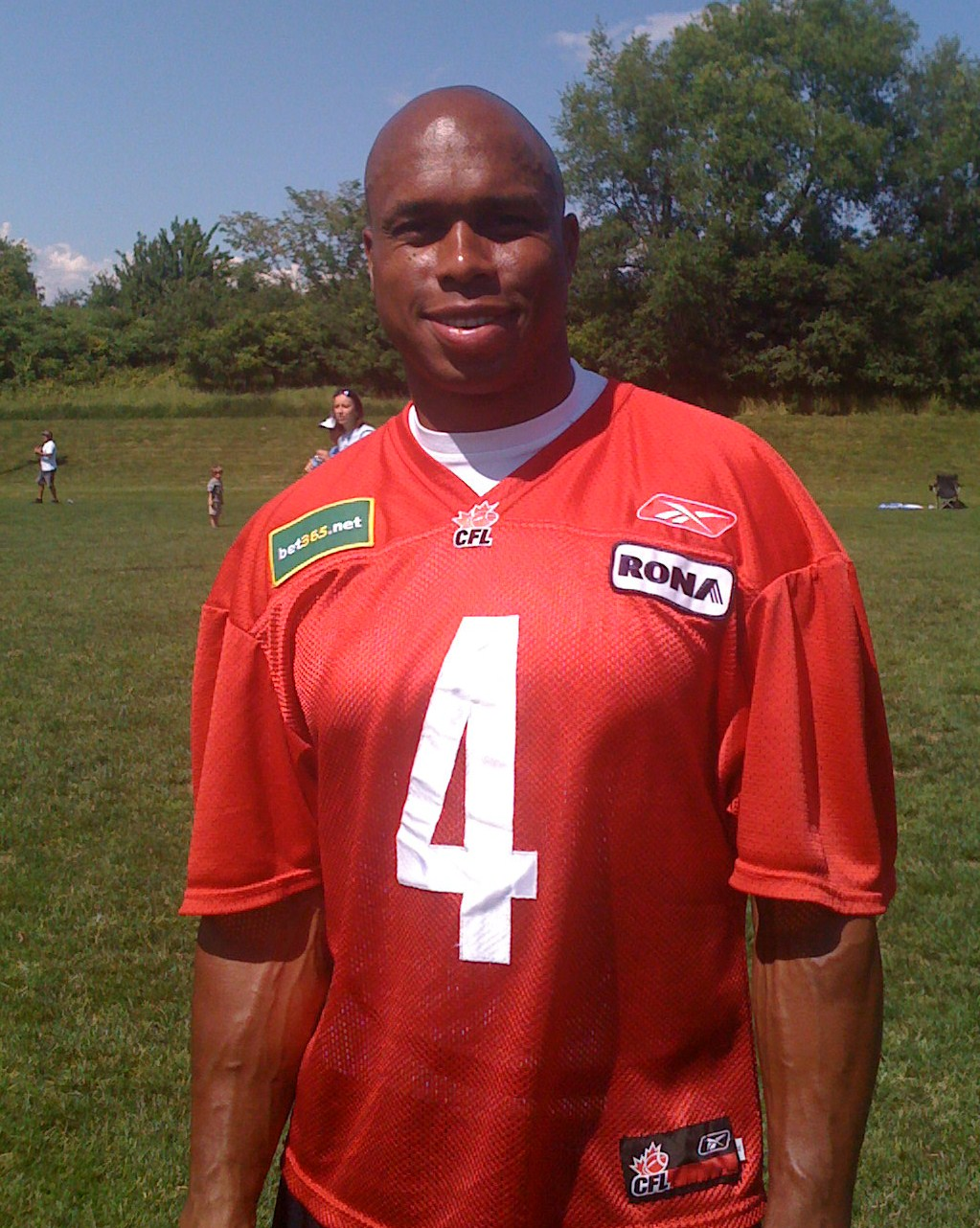
- Joseph with the Toronto Argonauts in 2009

No. 12, 27, 40, 28, 36, 4, 14, 5
- Positions: Quarterback, safety

Personal information
- Born: October 4, 1973 (age 53); New Iberia, Louisiana, U.S.
- Listed height: 6 ft 0 in (1.83 m)
- Listed weight: 215 lb (98 kg)

Career information
- High school: New Iberia
- College: McNeese State
- NFL draft: 1996: undrafted

Career history

Playing
- Cincinnati Bengals (1996); Washington Redskins (1997)*; → London Monarchs (1997); Rhein Fire (1998); Seattle Seahawks (1998–2001); Ottawa Renegades (2003–2005); Saskatchewan Roughriders (2006–2007); Toronto Argonauts (2008–2009); Edmonton Eskimos (2010–2013); Saskatchewan Roughriders (2014)
- * Offseason or practice squad member only

Coaching
- New Orleans Saints (2014) Training camp intern; McNeese State (2016–2017) Co-offensive coordinator & wide receivers coach; Tampa Bay Buccaneers (2017) Training camp intern; McNeese State (2018) Interim head coach, co-offensive coordinator & quarterbacks coach; Southeastern Louisiana (2019) Passing game coordinator & running backs coach; Seattle Seahawks (2020) Offensive assistant; Seattle Seahawks (2021) Assistant wide receivers coach; Seattle Seahawks (2022–2023) Assistant quarterbacks coach; Chicago Bears (2024) Quarterbacks coach; Texas (2025) Special Assistant to the head coach; Memphis (2026) Assistant Defensive Back Coach/Sr. Defensive Analyst

Awards and highlights
- Grey Cup champion (2007); CFL's Most Outstanding Player Award (2007); Jeff Nicklin Memorial Trophy (2007); CFL All-Star (2007); World Bowl champion (1998); All-NFL Europe (1998)

Career NFL statistics
- Tackles: 143
- Interceptions: 3
- Fumble recoveries: 1
- Stats at Pro Football Reference
- Stats at CFL.ca

Kerry Tremaine Joseph (born October 4, 1973) is an American football coach and former player. He is currently an assistant defensive back coach/Sr. defensive analyst for the Memphis Tigers football program. He played college football for the McNeese Cowboys as a quarterback and was signed by the Cincinnati Bengals as an undrafted free agent in 1996.

Joseph later played safety for the Seattle Seahawks from 1998 to 2001. Joseph then played in the Canadian Football League (CFL) as a quarterback from 2003 to 2014. He was named the CFL's Most Outstanding Player in 2007 while leading the Saskatchewan Roughriders to victory in the 95th Grey Cup. At the end of the season, he had completed 267 of 459 passes for 4,002 yards and 24 touchdowns. He also led all quarterbacks in the league in rushing with 737 yards on 90 attempts and 13 touchdowns.

== Playing career ==
=== College ===
In college Joseph played quarterback for McNeese State University, leading his team to a 42–11 record and two Southland Conference titles during four seasons as a starter.

=== Cincinnati Bengals ===
After going undrafted in the 1996 NFL draft, Joseph signed with the Cincinnati Bengals on April 22, 1996. He was on the Bengals' active roster in 1996 as the third-string quarterback, but did not play in any games. He was released on May 6, 1997.

=== Washington Redskins ===
On May 13, 1997, it was reported that Joseph had signed with the Washington Redskins. He was allocated to the World League of American Football, where he played for the London Monarchs during the 1997 WLAF season. He completed 29 of 69 passes for 263 yards, no touchdowns, and three interceptions while also rushing ten times for 73 yards for the Monarchs in 1997. He was placed on injured reserve on June 6, 1997. Joseph played for the Redskins during the 1997 NFL preseason as a running back. He was released by Washington on August 25, 1997, after losing two fumbles in a preseason game.

=== Rhein Fire ===
Joseph played for the Rhein Fire of NFL Europe in 1998 as a safety. He recorded 41 defensive tackles, six special teams tackles, three interceptions for 25 yards, seven pass breakups, one sack, one forced fumble, and four punt returns for 43 yards for the Fire during the 1998 season. He earned All-NFL Europe honors as the Fire won World Bowl '98.

=== Seattle Seahawks ===
Joseph signed with the Seattle Seahawks on June 29, 1998. He played safety for Seattle from 1998 to 2001, appearing in 56 games while starting 14. He posted career NFL totals of 117 solo tackles, 26 assisted tackles, three interceptions for 82 yards, 11 pass breakups, one sack, one forced fumble, one fumble recovery, 15 kick returns for 335 yards, and 17 punt returns for 194 yards. Joseph became a free agent after the 2001 season.

=== Ottawa Renegades ===
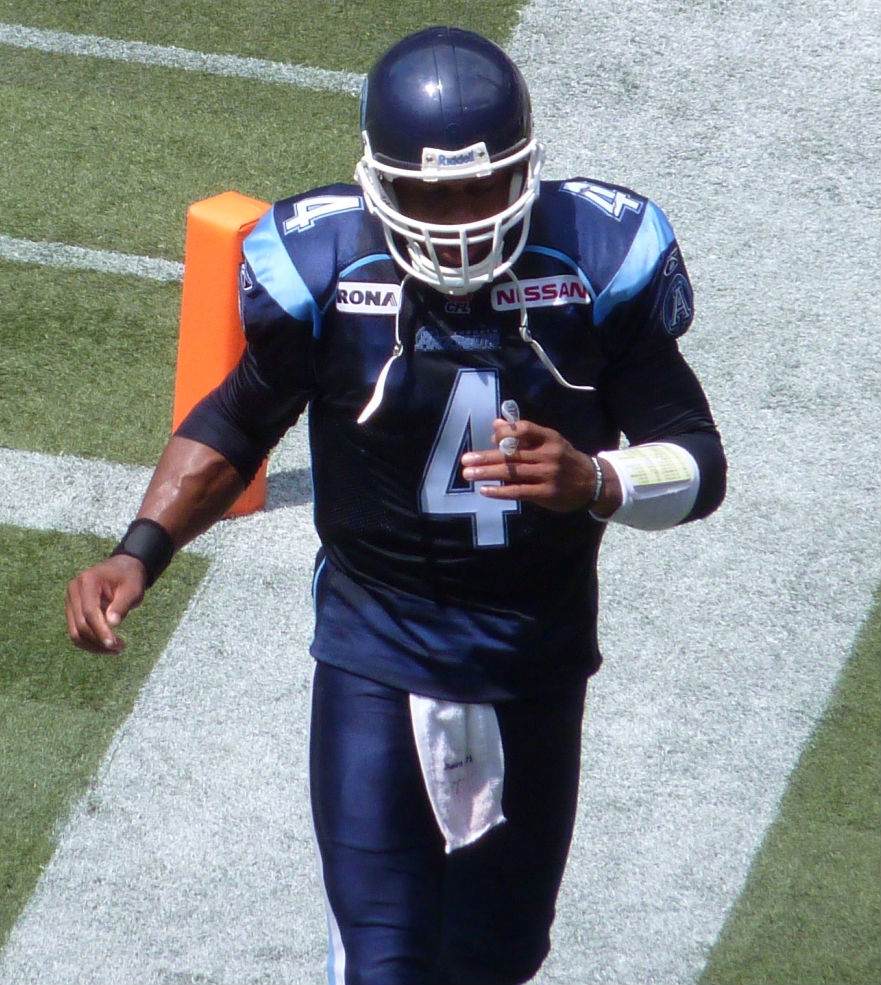
Joseph with the Argonauts in 2009

Joseph then headed to Canada to try his luck at playing quarterback again. He was acquired as a free agent by the Ottawa Renegades in 2003 and during that season unseated incumbent Dan Crowley for the starting job. In the last game of the 2005 season, a victory over the division-leading Toronto Argonauts, Joseph became only the third (after Damon Allen and Tracy Ham) quarterback in Canadian Football League history to garner over 1000 rushing yards in a single season, finishing with 1006.

=== Saskatchewan Roughriders ===
The Renegades suspended operations, but on April 12, 2006, Joseph was selected first overall by Saskatchewan in the Ottawa Renegades dispersal draft.

On November 25, 2007, Joseph won the Grey Cup for the first time in his career, winning 23–19 over the Winnipeg Blue Bombers. On November 29, 2007, he was announced as the first ever CFLPA Pro Player of the Year after fan voting during Grey Cup week.

=== Toronto Argonauts ===
Joseph was traded from the Saskatchewan Roughriders to the Toronto Argonauts on March 5, 2008, along with 2010 third round draft pick in exchange for offensive tackle Glenn January, defensive lineman Ronald Flemons, the Argos' 2008 first-round pick and a 2010 second-round selection.

After being traded to the Argos, Joseph struggled with the team, being knocked out of the playoffs for the two seasons that he played there.

On February 21, 2010, Joseph was released by the Argos along with fellow quarterback Cody Pickett and linebacker Zeke Moreno.

=== Edmonton Eskimos ===
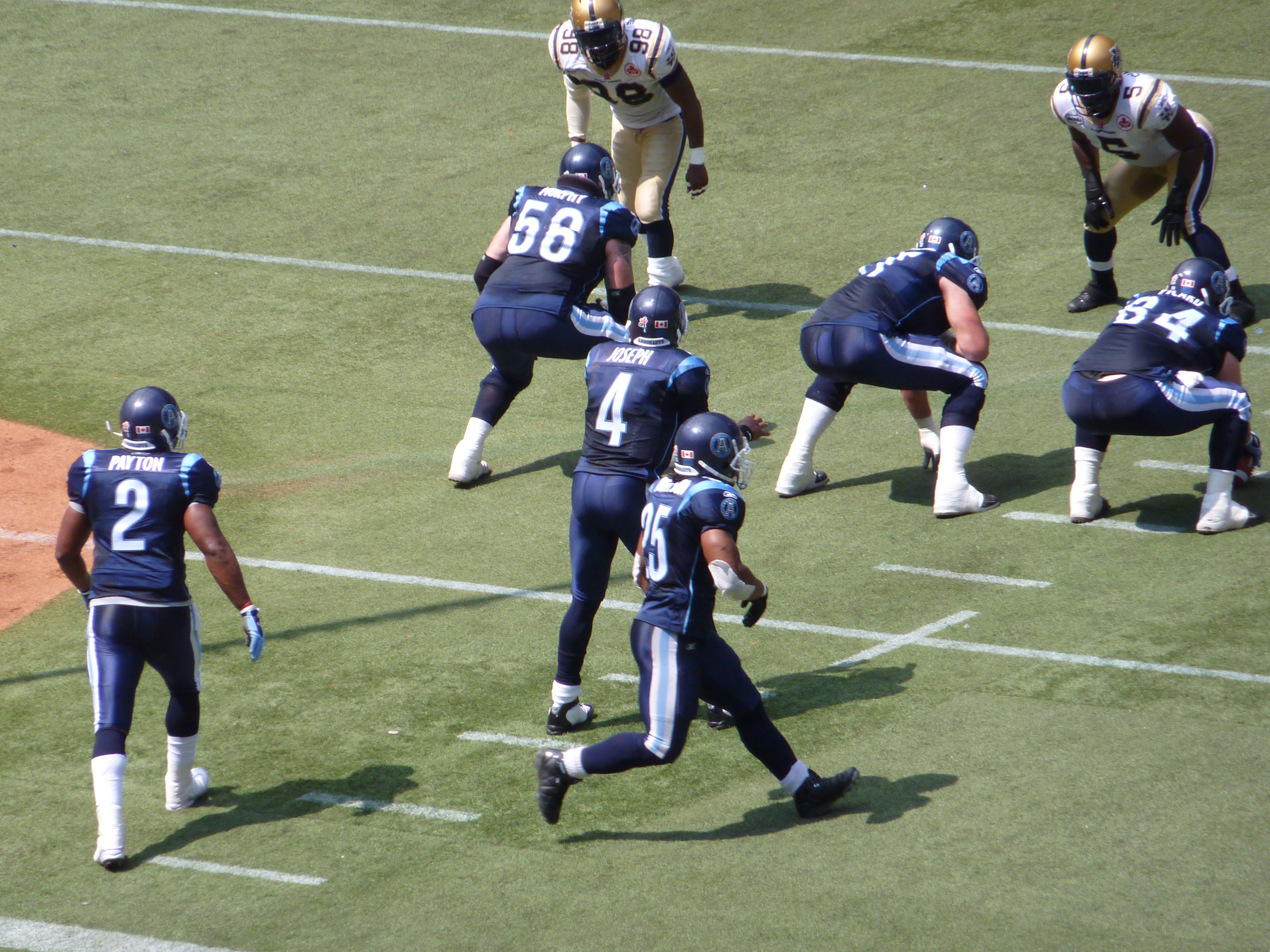
Joseph taking a snap in 2009

On October 25, 2010, Joseph was signed by the Edmonton Eskimos to a practice roster agreement after speculation that starting quarterback Ricky Ray would sit out the final two games of the 2010 CFL season.

On December 16, 2010, it was announced that Joseph had been released by the Eskimos.

On January 25, 2011, it was announced that Joseph had been hired as a personal trainer at Cross Gates Athletic Club in Slidell, Louisiana.

On June 8, 2011, he signed with the Eskimos.

During the 2012 season, after starting quarterback Steven Jyles went down with an injury, Joseph started 3 games and threw for 1286 yards with 9 touchdowns and 6 interceptions.

On January 28, 2014, Joseph announced his retirement from pro football.

Joseph was the Program Director of Parisi Speed School in Slidell, La after retiring.

=== Return to Saskatchewan ===
On October 7, 2014, it announced by the Saskatchewan Roughriders that he was coming out of retirement to return to his former team. Prior to his resigning with the Roughriders, Joseph had been working as a coaching intern with the New Orleans Saints. Joseph made his first start of the season against the Edmonton Eskimos on October 19, 2014. Joseph had been a member of the Eskimos organization until the end of the 2013 season and retired in early 2014. Joseph played in 2 more regular season games for the Roughriders and 1 playoff game. In said playoff game Joseph struggled, throwing 5 interceptions on 17 pass attempts for a passer rating of 45.8.

On December 5, 2014, Joseph announced his retirement from the CFL as a Saskatchewan Roughrider.

In August 2019, Joseph was inducted in the Saskatchewan Roughriders Plaza of Honour.

== CFL statistics ==
=== Regular season ===
| Year | Team | GP | GS | ATT | COMP | YD | TD | INT | RUSH | YD | TD |
|---|---|---|---|---|---|---|---|---|---|---|---|
| 2003 | OTT | 18 | 14 | 475 | 269 | 3,694 | 19 | 20 | 82 | 616 | 6 |
| 2004 | OTT | 12 | 12 | 317 | 197 | 2,762 | 13 | 10 | 57 | 418 | 4 |
| 2005 | OTT | 18 | 18 | 537 | 337 | 4,466 | 25 | 23 | 153 | 1,006 | 9 |
| 2006 | SSK | 18 | 14 | 463 | 267 | 3,489 | 22 | 17 | 91 | 583 | 4 |
| 2007 | SSK | 18 | 17 | 459 | 267 | 4,002 | 24 | 8 | 90 | 737 | 13 |
| 2008 | TOR | 18 | 16 | 536 | 307 | 4,174 | 17 | 14 | 78 | 493 | 4 |
| 2009 | TOR | 18 | 10 | 337 | 185 | 2,244 | 10 | 16 | 52 | 302 | 2 |
| 2010 | EDM | 1 | 0 | 0 | - | - | - | - | 0 | - | - |
| 2011 | EDM | 18 | 0 | 31 | 18 | 226 | 0 | 1 | 26 | 77 | 6 |
| 2012 | EDM | 18 | 7 | 254 | 153 | 2,187 | 12 | 10 | 40 | 238 | 3 |
| 2013 | EDM | 18 | 0 | 34 | 18 | 247 | 2 | 2 | 18 | 69 | 4 |
| 2014 | SSK | 4 | 3 | 89 | 43 | 606 | 4 | 5 | 10 | 45 | 1 |
| Totals | | 179 | 111 | 3,532 | 2,061 | 28,097 | 148 | 126 | 697 | 4,584 | 56 |

=== Playoffs ===
| Year & game | Team | GP | GS | ATT | COMP | YD | TD | INT | RUSH | YD | TD |
|---|---|---|---|---|---|---|---|---|---|---|---|
| 2006 West Semi-Final | SSK | 1 | 1 | 31 | 17 | 180 | 1 | 0 | 6 | 25 | 0 |
| 2006 West Final | SSK | 1 | 1 | 23 | 15 | 210 | 1 | 1 | 7 | 46 | 0 |
| 2007 West Semi-Final | SSK | 1 | 1 | 35 | 23 | 391 | 1 | 1 | 14 | 109 | 0 |
| 2007 West Final | SSK | 1 | 1 | 35 | 18 | 209 | 2 | 0 | 5 | 43 | 0 |
| 2011 West Semi-Final | EDM | 1 | 0 | 0 | - | - | - | - | 0 | - | - |
| 2011 West Final | EDM | 1 | 0 | 0 | - | - | - | - | 0 | - | - |
| 2012 *East Semi-Final | EDM | 1 | 1 | 25 | 12 | 192 | 2 | 1 | 6 | 58 | 1 |
| 2014 West Semi-Final | SSK | 1 | 1 | 17 | 7 | 120 | 1 | 5 | 0 | - | - |
| Totals | | 8 | 6 | 166 | 92 | 1,302 | 8 | 8 | 38 | 281 | 1 |

*team qualified for playoff crossover

=== Grey Cup ===
| Year | Team | GP | GS | ATT | COMP | YD | TD | INT | RUSH | YD | TD |
|---|---|---|---|---|---|---|---|---|---|---|---|
| 2007 | SSK | 1 | 1 | 34 | 13 | 181 | 1 | 1 | 10 | 101 | 0 |
| Totals | | 1 | 1 | 34 | 13 | 181 | 1 | 1 | 10 | 101 | 0 |

== Coaching career ==
In 2014, Joseph served as a training camp intern with the New Orleans Saints under head coach Sean Payton.

In 2016, Joseph was hired as the co-offensive coordinator and wide receivers coach at McNeese State University.

In 2017, Joseph served as a training camp intern with the Tampa Bay Buccaneers under head coach Dirk Koetter.

In 2018, Joseph returned to McNeese State as co-offensive coordinator and quarterbacks coach. In November 2018, Joseph was named interim head coach, following the termination of head coach Lance Guidry after a 6–5 campaign.

In March 2019, Joseph was hired as the passing game coordinator and running backs coach at Southeastern Louisiana University.

In 2020, Joseph was hired by the Seattle Seahawks as an offensive assistant under head coach Pete Carroll. On March 3, 2021, Joseph was promoted to assistant wide receivers coach. In 2022, Joseph was promoted to assistant quarterbacks coach.

On January 26, 2024, Joseph was hired by the Chicago Bears as their quarterbacks coach under head coach Matt Eberflus. On January 23, 2025, the Bears announced that they would not retain Joseph for the 2025 season.

Joseph joined the University of Texas Longhorns football program for the 2025 season as Special Assistant to the Head Coach, Defense.

In 2026, it was announced Joseph had joined Charles Huff's Memphis Tiger staff, as an assistant defensive back coach/Sr. defensive analyst.
