= Ottawa Renegades =

Canadian Football League franchise (2002–2006)

- Logo
- Uniforms

General information
- Founded: 2002
- Folded: 2008
- Stadium: Frank Clair Stadium
- Headquartered: Ottawa, Ontario, Canada
- Colours: Black, red, white, pewter, and tan
- Mascot: Ruffy the Beaver

Nickname
- Gades

League / conference affiliations
- Canadian Football League: East Division

The Ottawa Renegades were a Canadian Football League franchise based in Ottawa, Ontario founded in 2002, six years after the storied Ottawa Rough Riders folded. After four seasons, the Renegades franchise was suspended indefinitely by the league due to financial instability, and its players were absorbed by the other teams in a dispersal draft.

After two years in limbo, the Renegades franchise was awarded to Jeff Hunt, best known as the owner of the Ottawa 67's, in March 2008. The new franchise was revived in 2014 and rebranded as the Ottawa Redblacks. For historical purposes, the CFL classifies the Redblacks, Renegades and Rough Riders as one discontinuous franchise.

== History ==
Ottawa Renegades uniform: 2002–2004

The Ottawa Renegades returned Canadian Football League action to Canada's capital in 2002. Ottawa had been without a team since 1996, when the Ottawa Rough Riders folded. The logo chosen draws similarities to the logo used by the Rough Riders for much of their existence up until 1992. The Renegades played four seasons and never qualified for the playoffs. In May 2005, Bernard Glieberman (former owner of the Rough Riders and the CFL USA's Shreveport Pirates) took ownership of the team, and made his son Lonie Glieberman team president, and many of the same names they had employed during the unsuccessful years of Glieberman's ownership of their previous teams started reappearing (for example, Björn Nittmo, by this point severely brain-damaged, almost 39 years old and out of football since 2001, was brought in as a potential kicker in the 2005 season). The team's only head coach was Joe Paopao. On November 7, 2005, the Ottawa Renegades announced John Jenkins as head coach and General Manager for 2006, with Forrest Gregg serving as the team's Executive VP for football. However, this did not occur because of the suspension of the team's operations.

On March 3, 2006, Lonie Glieberman resigned from day-to-day operations of the team, acknowledging that he made mistakes during his tenure.

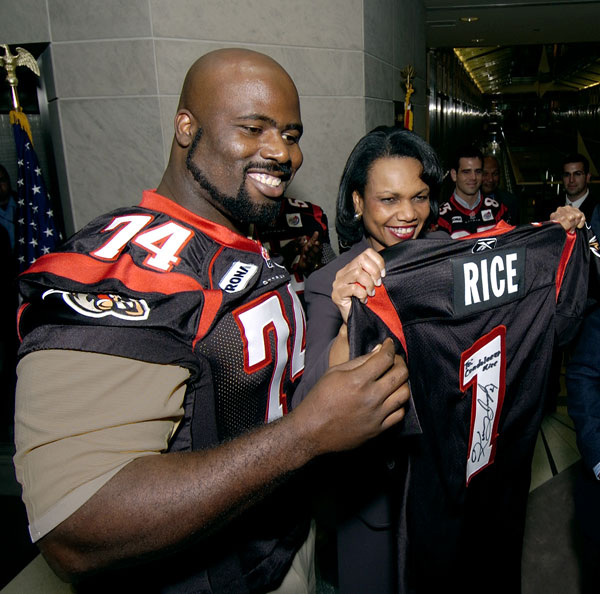
Johnny Scott presents a Renegades jersey to U.S. Secretary of State Condoleezza Rice at the American Embassy in 2005.

With the team losing $3.8 million in 2005, and the possibility of losing an additional $2.3 million to $5.8 million in 2006, the organization requested financial assistance from the CFL, which the league was not willing to provide. On March 22, 2006, Bernie Glieberman decided to stop funding the Renegades. While the CFL previously took over operations of the Toronto Argonauts and the Hamilton Tiger-Cats in 2003, on April 9, 2006, the CFL's board of governors decided against doing the same for the Renegades, instead choosing to look for a new owner. The CFL moved its easternmost-West Division team, the Winnipeg Blue Bombers, back to the East Division for the third time in its history to take Ottawa's place and to balance out the divisions (the Bombers played in the East from 1987–94, 1997–2001 and this time from 2006–13).

The players of the Ottawa Renegades were dispersed to the remaining eight CFL teams in a dispersal draft, with QB Kerry Joseph going #1 to the Saskatchewan Roughriders.

Steelback Brewery president Frank D'Angelo announced in April 2006 that he was exploring opportunities to revive the team. The announcement was not cleared with the Canadian Football League, who indicated that they had had only one informal conversation with D'Angelo, in which no decision was made.

On May 15, 2007, the CFL announced that it had ended discussions with a group led by William Palmer regarding the return of a CFL team to Ottawa for the 2008 season.

CFL Commissioner Mark Cohon stated "[s]everal parties have expressed interest regarding a franchise for Ottawa, and we have decided to concentrate efforts on these new opportunities. The CFL remains committed to the City of Ottawa, and we remain determined to return a franchise to the nation’s capital only at a time and under circumstances that will ensure strength and stability in the long run".

However, in September 2007, the lower south side of Frank Clair Stadium was closed, due to cracks in the concrete structure. Ottawa mayor Larry O'Brien was quoted at the time that this was an opportunity to do a review of the usage and the facilities of Lansdowne Park.

On March 25, 2008, the league ended the team's indefinite limbo by awarding the franchise to Jeff Hunt, owner of the Ottawa 67's. The team began play in 2014, and did not retain the name Renegades because of its troubled history (and could not use the Rough Riders name due to objections from the Saskatchewan Roughriders), instead being called the Ottawa Redblacks.

== Seasons ==
Season	League	Finish	Wins	Losses	Ties	Playoffs
2002	CFL	4th, East	4	14	0	No
2003	CFL	3rd, East	7	11	0	No
2004	CFL	4th, East	5	13	0	No
2005	CFL	3rd, East	7	11	0	No
Season Totals (2002–2005)			23	49	0	0 of 4

== Players ==
As of the start of the 2018 CFL season, Kyries Hebert was the last active former Renegade player still on a CFL team roster. He is also the only former Renegade to have played for the Ottawa Redblacks. Former Renegades Korey Banks, Kerry Joseph, Yo Murphy, Marc Parenteau, and Markus Howell have also gone on to be Grey Cup champions.

Dan Crowley was the team's first starting quarterback. Throughout 2002, backup quarterbacks Chuck Clements and Oteman Sampson, also saw some starting time. However, in 2003, Kerry Joseph, was the quarterback to ultimately succeed Crowley. During 2003, Romaro Miller also started at quarterback. During 2004 and 2005, Joseph functioned as the primary starting quarterback. However, backups Darnell Kennedy and Brad Banks also saw time as the starter, in relief of Joseph.

== See also ==
- Ottawa Renegades all time records and statistics
- Canadian Football Hall of Fame
- Canadian football
- Lansdowne Park
- List of Canadian Football League seasons
- Ottawa Rough Riders
- Ottawa Redblacks
