= 2004 Winnipeg Blue Bombers season =

Canadian football team season

- Head coach: Dave Ritchie; Jim Daley (Interim)
- Home stadium: Canad Inns Stadium

Results
- Record: 7–11
- Division place: 4th, West
- Playoffs: did not qualify

Uniform

The 2004 Winnipeg Blue Bombers finished in fourth place in the West Division with a 7–11 record and failed to make the playoffs.

== Offseason ==
=== CFL draft ===
Round	Pick	Player	Position	School/Club team
3	24	Jon Ryan	WR/K	Regina
4	33	Neil McKinlay	LB	Simon Fraser
5	43	Ryan Folk	LB	Calgary
6	51	John Sullivan	S	Waterloo

== Regular season ==
=== Season standings ===
West Division
Pos	Team	Pld	W	L	T	PF	PA	PD	Pts
1	BC Lions (C, Q)	18	13	5	0	584	436	+148	26
2	Edmonton Eskimos (Q)	18	9	9	0	532	472	+60	18
3	Saskatchewan Roughriders (Q)	18	9	9	0	476	444	+32	18
4	Winnipeg Blue Bombers	18	7	11	0	448	507	−59	14
5	Calgary Stampeders	18	4	14	0	396	522	−126	8

Source: "2004 Regular Season Standings". Archived from the original on 2011-11-10.
(C) First round bye; (Q) Qualified for playoffs

=== Season schedule ===
Week	Date	Opponent	Score	Result	Attendance	Record
1	June 17	vs. Ottawa Renegades	37–25	Loss	22,059	0–1
2	June 25	at Hamilton Tiger-Cats	32–22	Loss	25,712	0–2
3	Bye					0–2
4	July 8	vs. Saskatchewan Roughriders	32–15	Win	22,059	1–2
5	July 16	at Ottawa Renegades	29–1	Win	21,411	2–2
6	July 22	vs. BC Lions	48–17	Loss	25,567	2–3
7	July 30	at Edmonton Eskimos	41–24	Loss	38,363	2–4
8	August 7	at Calgary Stampeders	49–27	Loss	30,144	2–5
9	August 12	vs. Edmonton Eskimos	25–14	Win	23,998	3–5
10	August 17	at Toronto Argonauts	14–6	Loss	24,246	3–6
11	August 26	vs. Montreal Alouettes	29–13	Loss	22,826	3–7
12	Sept 5	at Saskatchewan Roughriders	17–4	Win	30,220	4–7
13	Sept 12	vs. Saskatchewan Roughriders	27–24	Win	27,160	5–7
14	Sept 18	vs. Toronto Argonauts	44–34	Win	27,983	6–7
15	Sept 25	at Montreal Alouettes	47–25	Loss	20,202	6–8
16	Oct 2	at BC Lions	42–31	Loss	29,170	6–9
17	Oct 8	vs. Hamilton Tiger-Cats	20–13	Loss	26,323	6–10
18	Bye					6–10
19	Oct 24	at Edmonton Eskimos	40–34	Loss	33,131	6–11
20	Oct 29	vs. Calgary Stampeders	37–16	Win	23,119	7–11

== Roster ==
2004 Winnipeg Blue Bombers final roster
Quarterbacks: 5 Kevin Glenn; 8 Stanley Jackson; 13 Tee Martin; Running backs: 34 Wade Miller; 33 Cory Olynick; 21 Scott Regimbald; 1 Charles Roberts; Receivers: 16 Gilles Colon; 84 Bob Gordon; 9 Kamau Peterson; 85 Milt Stegall; 88 Jamie Stoddard; 3 Keith Stokes	Offensive linemen: 53 Corey Annett C/G; 66 Orlando Bobo G; 64 Mo Elewonibi C; 57 Jermese Jones T; 68 Dave Mudge T; 77 Jon Oosterhuis T; 54 Matt Sheridan G; Defensive linemen: 97 Doug Brown DT; 44 Tom Canada DE; 76 Joe Fleming DT; 56 Elfrid Payton DE; 91 Tyson St. James DE	Linebackers: 24 Maurice Kelly; 36 Lamar McGriggs; 42 Neil McKinlay; 55 Ryland Wickman; Defensive backs: 20 Ricky Bell; 22 Jason Bray; 2 Eric Carter; 29 Justin Coleman; 37 Ced Dickerson; 27 Geoff Drover; 26 Steve Fisher; 31 Wes Lysack	Special teams: 19 Chris Cvetkovic LS; 14 Jon Ryan P; 7 Troy Westwood K; Injured list: 41 Melvin Bradley DT; 23 Tim Carter DB; 90 Denny Fortney DT; 62 Dan Gyetvai T/G; 12 Markus Howell DB; 18 Joseph Morgan DB; 4 Derrick Smith WR; 25 Terry Ray LB; Italics indicate International player

== Awards and records ==
- CFL's Most Outstanding Special Teams Award – Keith Stokes (WR)

=== 2004 CFL All-Stars ===
- RB – Charles Roberts, CFL All-Star
- ST – Keith Stokes, CFL All-Star

=== Western All-Star selections ===
- RB – Charles Roberts, CFL Western All-Star
- ST – Keith Stokes, CFL Western All-Star
- DE – Tom Canada, CFL Western All-Star
- DB – Wes Lysack, CFL Western All-Star
