= 2008 Winnipeg Blue Bombers season =

Canadian football team season

- Head coach: Doug Berry
- Home stadium: Canad Inns Stadium

Results
- Record: 8–10
- Division place: 2nd, East
- Playoffs: Lost East Semi-Final

Uniform

The 2008 Winnipeg Blue Bombers season was the 51st season for the team in the Canadian Football League (CFL) and their 76th overall. The Blue Bombers attempted to win their 11th Grey Cup championship, but they lost in the Eastern Semi-Final game against the Edmonton Eskimos, who crossed over from the West.

== Offseason ==
=== CFL draft ===
The Winnipeg Blue Bombers moved up in the CFL draft without even making a trade. The Bombers moved into the sixth spot in the CFL's college entry draft when the Montreal Alouettes lost their first choice. The Alouettes lost the choice because the club exceeded its salary cap by more than $100,000.

Round	Pick	Player	Position	School/Club team
1	6	Brendon LaBatte	OL	Regina
2	15	Aaron Hargreaves	WR	Simon Fraser
3	24 (via Edmonton via Saskatchewan)	Daryl Stephenson	RB	Windsor
4	31	Marc Bestwick	DB	Saint Mary's
5	39	Don Oramasionwu	DL	Manitoba
6	47	Pierre-Luc Labbé	LB	Sherbrooke

=== Transactions ===
- On May 20, the Bombers officially signed former U.S. college stars Bryan Randall and Cleveland McCoy.
- On Tuesday, May 27, Milt Stegall announced that he will not participate in the Winnipeg Blue Bombers training camp after undergoing knee surgery May 2.
- The Bombers also announced they've released veteran cornerback Juran Bolden. The 33-year-old Tampa native spent the 2007 CFL season with Winnipeg, but didn't play in the Grey Cup due to a hamstring injury. The six-foot-three, 210-pound Bolden was originally a fourth-round pick of the NFL's Atlanta Falcons in 1996. Bolden twice played for the Falcons ('96–'97, 2002–'03). Other NFL teams included the Carolina Panthers ('98), Kansas City Chiefs ('99), Jacksonville Jaguars ('04) and Tampa Bay Buccaneers ('05–'06).

== Regular season ==
On September 12 at Rogers Centre, Milt Stegall became the most prolific receiver in the history of the CFL. The slotback caught a 92-yard pass at 9:02 in the second quarter to raise his career total to 14,983, breaking the mark of 14,891 yards previously held by former Stampeders receiver Allen Pitts. Stegall took a pass from Kevin Glenn and scored a touchdown, his second of the game. It put the Bombers ahead 28–3. The touchdown was Stegall's 14,983rd career receiving yard. With the record broken, the announced crowd of 28,453 stood to applaud the milestone.

=== Season standings ===
East Division
Pos	Team	Pld	W	L	T	PF	PA	PD	Pts
1	Montreal Alouettes (C, Q)	18	11	7	0	610	443	+167	22
2	Winnipeg Blue Bombers (Q)	18	8	10	0	435	490	−55	16
3	Toronto Argonauts	18	4	14	0	397	627	−230	8
4	Hamilton Tiger-Cats	18	3	15	0	441	593	−152	6

Source: "2008 Regular Season Standings". Canadian Football League. Archived from the original on 2009-02-05.
(C) First round bye; (Q) Qualified for playoffs

=== Transactions ===
- September 9: Winnipeg acquired middle linebacker Zeke (And Destroy) Moreno and a conditional draft pick from Hamilton for its first-round draft pick in 2009 and the rights to Canadian defensive lineman Corey Mace.

=== Season schedule ===
Week	Date	Opponent	Score	Result	Attendance	Record
1	June 27	vs. Toronto Argonauts	23–16	Loss	26,155	0–1
2	July 4	at Montreal Alouettes	38–24	Loss	20,202	0–2
3	July 11	vs. BC Lions	42–24	Loss	26,735	0–3
4	July 18	at BC Lions	27–18	Loss	37,174	0–4
5	July 24	vs. Calgary Stampeders	32–28	Win	26,882	1–4
6	Aug 1	at Toronto Argonauts	19–11	Loss	28,523	1–5
7	Aug 8	vs. Montreal Alouettes	39–11	Loss	27,674	1–6
8	Aug 14	vs. Hamilton Tiger-Cats	37–24	Win	25,484	2–6
9	Bye					2–6
10	Aug 31	at Saskatchewan Roughriders	19–6	Loss	30,985	2–7
11	Sept 7	vs. Saskatchewan Roughriders	34–31	Loss	29,770	2–8
12	Sept 12	at Toronto Argonauts	39–9	Win	28,453	3–8
13	Sept 19	at Hamilton Tiger-Cats	25–23	Win	19,102	4–8
14	Sept 26	vs. Edmonton Eskimos	30–23	Win	29,794	5–8
15	Oct 4	at Edmonton Eskimos	36–22	Loss	40,453	5–9
16	Oct 10	vs. Toronto Argonauts	25–16	Win	27,368	6–9
17	Oct 18	at Calgary Stampeders	37–16	Loss	30,110	6–10
18	Oct 26	at Montreal Alouettes	24–23	Win	20,202	7–10
19	Nov 1	vs. Hamilton Tiger-Cats	44–30	Win	24,595	8–10

== Roster ==
2008 Winnipeg Blue Bombers final roster
Quarterbacks: 17 Timmy Chang; 5 Kevin Glenn; 10 Bryan Randall; Running backs: 26 Graeme Bell; 32 Fred Reid; Receivers: 83 Derick Armstrong; 81 Romby Bryant; 82 Terrence Edwards; 86 Arjei Franklin; 12 Kerry Johnson; 85 Milt Stegall; 88 Jamie Stoddard	Offensive linemen: 55 Ryan Donnelly C/G; 66 Alexandre Gauthier T; 64 Dan Goodspeed T; 57 Brendon LaBatte G; 67 Matt O'Meara G/T; 53 Dominic Picard C; 62 Bobby Singh G; Defensive linemen: 97 Doug Brown DT; 90 Kai Ellis DE; 99 Jerome Haywood DT; 92 Matt Kuda DT; 91 Shawn Mayne DE; 98 Gavin Walls DE; Special teams: 50 Chris Cvetkovic LS; 18 Alexis Serna K/P	Linebackers: 0 Ike Charlton; 40 Cam Hall; 47 Pierre-Luc Labbé; 41 Anthony Maggiacomo; 42 Neil McKinlay; 19 Zeke Moreno; Defensive backs: 8 Greg Bearman; 20 Marc Beswick; 9 Willie Byrd; 30 Steve Holness; 24 Jovon Johnson; 31 Ian Logan; 3 Anthony Malbrough; 27 Kelly Malveaux; 13 Jason Nugent; 16 Stanford Samuels	Reserve roster: 22 Jason Armstead SB; 15 Aaron Hargreaves SB; 60 Obby Khan C; 33 Joe Smith RB; Practice roster: 68 Darryl Conrad G; 21 Casey McGahee WR; 93 Josh Miller DT; 34 Daryl Stephenson RB; 2 Marcus Winn LB; Injured list: 14 Willie Amos DB; 44 Tom Canada DE; 2 Ryan Dinwiddie QB; 61 Kyle Koch G; 58 Joe Lobendahn LB; 77 Jon Oosterhuis DT; 23 Michael Roberts DB; 54 Matt Sheridan G; 51 Barrin Simpson LB; Italics indicate International player

== Statistics ==
=== Offence ===
==== Passing ====
Player	Att	Comp	%	Yards	TD	INT	Rating
Kevin Glenn	454	293	64.5	3637	20	20	85.6
Ryan Dinwiddie	160	93	58.1	1299	5	6	79.2
Bryan Randall	22	9	40.9	99	0	1	36.0
Fred Reid	1	0	0	0	0	1	(−414.6)
Timmy Chang	1	0	0.0	0	0	0	2.1

==== Rushing ====
Player	Att	Yards	Avg.	TD	Fumbles
Fred Reid	101	709	7.0	3	0
Joe Smith	124	617	5.0	5	0
Kevin Glenn	29	102	3.5	0	2
Ryan Dinwiddie	21	101	4.8	1	1
Bryan Randall	12	78	6.5	0	0
Terrence Edwards	4	32	8.0	0	0

==== Receiving ====
Player	No.	Yards	Avg.	Long	TD
Romby Bryant	63	1156	18.3	85	9
Derick Armstrong	81	1010	12.5	63	5
Terrence Edwards	76	1010	13.3	64	7
Arjei Franklin	52	620	11.9	73	1
Milt Stegall	30	470	15.7	92	3

Milt Stegall Has 14,750 receiving yards

== Awards and records ==
- Doug Brown, James P. McCaffrey Trophy

=== CFL All-Stars ===
- Dan Goodspeed, Offensive Tackle
- Doug Brown, Defensive Tackle
- Zeke Moreno, Linebacker

=== CFL Eastern All-Stars ===
- Doug Brown, CFL Eastern All-Star
- Dan Goodspeed, CFL Eastern All-Star, Offence
- Kelly Malveaux, CFL Eastern All-Star, Defence
- Zeke Moreno, CFL Eastern All-Star, Defence
- Fred Reid, CFL Eastern All-Star, Offence
- Gavin Walls, CFL Eastern All-Star, Defence

== Playoffs ==
=== East Semi-Final ===
Date and time: Saturday, November 8, 12:00 PM Central Standard Time
Venue: Canad Inns Stadium, Winnipeg, Manitoba

Team	Q1	Q2	Q3	Q4	Total
Edmonton Eskimos	3	18	8	0	29
Winnipeg Blue Bombers	8	7	0	6	21
