= 2002 Winnipeg Blue Bombers season =

Canadian football team season

- Head coach: Dave Ritchie
- Home stadium: Canad Inns Stadium

Results
- Record: 12–6
- Division place: 2nd, West
- Playoffs: Lost West Final

Uniform

The 2002 Winnipeg Blue Bombers finished in second place in the West Division with a 12–6 record. Due to the Ottawa Renegades entering the league, the Blue Bombers moved back to the West Division. They appeared in the West Final, but lost to the Edmonton Eskimos.

== Offseason ==
=== CFL draft ===
Round	Pick	Player	Position	School/club team
3	26	Michael Shaver	FB	Ottawa
4	35	Mike Faisthuber	SB	Manitoba
5	40	Lloyd Orris	RB	Simon Fraser
5	44	Joey Mikawoz	LB	Manitoba

== Regular season ==
=== Season standings ===
West Division
Pos	Team	Pld	W	L	T	OTL	PF	PA	PD	Pts
1	Edmonton Eskimos (C, Q)	18	13	5	0	0	516	450	+66	26
2	Winnipeg Blue Bombers (Q)	18	12	6	0	0	566	421	+145	24
3	BC Lions (Q)	18	10	8	0	0	480	399	+81	20
4	Saskatchewan Roughriders (Q)	18	8	8	0	2	435	393	+42	18
5	Calgary Stampeders	18	6	10	0	2	438	509	−71	14

Source: "CFL.ca". Archived from the original on 2009-06-29.
(C) First round bye; (Q) Qualified for playoffs

=== Season schedule ===
Week	Date	Opponent	Score	Result	Record
1	June 28	vs. Toronto Argonauts	39–15	Win	1–0
2	July 5	vs. Hamilton Tiger-Cats	24–15	Win	2–0
3	July 11	at Ottawa Renegades	25–24	Loss	2–1
4	July 17	vs. Ottawa Renegades	55–7	Win	3–1
5	July 23	at Toronto Argonauts	42–15	Win	4–1
5	July 27	at Montreal Alouettes	31–22	Loss	4–2
6	Bye				
7	Aug 9	vs. BC Lions	29–21	Loss	4–3
8	Aug 15	at Edmonton Eskimos	35–32	Loss	4–4
9	Aug 23	vs. Calgary Stampeders	51–48	Win	5–4
10	Sept 1	at Saskatchewan Roughriders	33–19	Loss	5–5
11	Sept 8	vs. BC Lions	44–28	Win	6–5
12	Bye				
13	Sept 20	vs. Montreal Alouettes	37–24	Win	7–5
14	Sept 27	at BC Lions	38–28	Loss	7–6
15	Oct 6	at Saskatchewan Roughriders	35–32	Win	8–6
16	Oct 12	vs. Saskatchewan Roughriders	20–11	Win	9–6
17	Oct 18	at Calgary Stampeders	35–20	Win	10–6
18	Oct 27	at Hamilton Tiger-Cats	28–7	Win	11–6
19	Nov 2	vs. Edmonton Eskimos	20–8	Win	12–6

== Playoffs ==
=== West Semi-Final ===
Team	Q1	Q2	Q3	Q4	Total
Winnipeg Blue Bombers	10	0	10	10	30
BC Lions	3	0	0	0	3

=== West Final ===
Team	Q1	Q2	Q3	Q4	Total
Edmonton Eskimos	11	11	10	1	33
Winnipeg Blue Bombers	0	6	7	17	30

== Roster ==
2002 Winnipeg Blue Bombers final roster
Quarterbacks: 14 Pat Barnes; 17 Khari Jones; 15 Brian Stallworth; Running backs: 34 Wade Miller; 1 Charles Roberts; 33 Mike Sellers; 32 Michael Shaver; 30 Brad Yamaoka; Receivers: 81 Andre Arlain; 4 Arland Bruce; 80 Geoff Drover; 82 Markus Howell; 87 Chad Plummer; 88 Jamie Stoddard	Offensive linemen: 64 Mo Elewonibi G/C; 62 Dan Gyetvai T; 51 Benedict Ibisi G; 68 Dave Mudge T; 69 Jon Oosterhuis T; 67 Eric Wilson G/DT; Defensive linemen: 56 Daved Benefield DE; 19 Inoke Breckterfield DE; 97 Doug Brown DT; 90 Denny Fortney DT; 99 Wayne Weathers DE; Special teams: 6 Bob Cameron P; 7 Troy Westwood K	Linebackers: 48 Brian Clark; 40 Jason Congdon; 38 Doug Hocking; 36 Lamar McGriggs; 55 Ryland Wickman; Defensive backs: 20 Ricky Bell; 31 Tyrone Bell; 5 Marvin Coleman; 2 Dave Donaldson; 13 Tom Europe; 26 Milo Lewis; 0 Harold Nash	Injured list: 84 Bob Gordon WR; 65 Scott Harper T; 92 Kirby Mack DE; 57 Brett MacNeil G; 54 Matt Sheridan T; 85 Milt Stegall SB; 54 Mike Sutherland C; 44 K. D. Williams LB; Suspended: -- Mike Bosnic T; 3 Mustafah Muhammad DB; -- John Robertson G; -- Jean-Michael Sylvain G; Italics indicate International player

== Awards and records ==
- CFL's Most Outstanding Player Award – Milt Stegall (SB)

=== 2002 CFL All-Stars ===
- RB – Charles Roberts, CFL All-Star
- SB – Milt Stegall, CFL All-Star
- OT – Dave Mudge, CFL All-Star
- DT – Doug Brown, CFL All-Star
- DT – Denny Fortney, CFL All-Star

=== Western All-Star selections ===
- QB – Khari Jones, CFL Western All-Star
- RB – Charles Roberts, CFL Western All-Star
- SB – Milt Stegall, CFL Western All-Star
- OT – Dave Mudge, CFL Western All-Star
- DT – Doug Brown, CFL Western All-Star
- DT – Denny Fortney, CFL Western All-Star
- DB – Harold Nash, CFL Western All-Star
- DS – Tom Europe, CFL Western All-Star
