= 2002 Ottawa Renegades season =

Canadian football team season

- Head coach: Joe Paopao
- Home stadium: Frank Clair Stadium

Results
- Record: 4–14
- Division place: 4th, East
- Playoffs: did not qualify

Uniform

The 2002 Ottawa Renegades season was the first in franchise history. It was the first time since the 1996 CFL season that the city of Ottawa had a team in the CFL. The Renegades finished fourth place in the East Division with a 4–14 record and failed to make the playoffs.

== Offseason ==
=== CFL draft ===
Round	Pick	Player	Position	School
1	1	Alexandre Gauthier	OL	Laval
1	2	Mike Vilimek	RB	Simon Fraser
2	10	D.J. Owchar	DL	Bowling Green
2	11	Pat Fleming	P	Bowling Green
2	12	Brock Ralph	WR	Wyoming
3	19	Kevin Lawrence	RB	Northwestern
5	37	Youdlain Marcellus	DB	Buffalo
6	46	Tyler Paopao	QB	Occidental

== Preseason ==
Game	Date	Opponent	Results		Venue	Attendance
Game	Date	Opponent	Score	Record	Venue	Attendance
B	Thu, June 13	vs. Toronto Argonauts	L 11–18	0–1	Frank Clair Stadium	19,213
C	Thu, June 20	at Montreal Alouettes	L 6–36	0–2	Molson Stadium	19,120

== Regular season ==
=== Season standings ===
East Division
Pos	Team	Pld	W	L	T	OTL	PF	PA	PD	Pts
1	Montreal Alouettes (C, Q)	18	13	4	0	1	587	407	+180	27
2	Toronto Argonauts (Q)	18	8	10	0	0	344	482	−138	16
3	Hamilton Tiger-Cats	18	7	10	0	1	427	524	−97	15
4	Ottawa Renegades	18	4	12	0	2	356	550	−194	10

Source: "CFL.ca". Archived from the original on 2009-06-29.
(C) First round bye; (Q) Qualified for playoffs

== Regular season ==
=== Schedule ===
Week	Game	Date	Opponent	Results		Venue	Attendance
Week	Game	Date	Opponent	Score	Record	Venue	Attendance
1	1	Fri, June 28	vs. Saskatchewan Roughriders	L 27–30 (OT)	0–1	Frank Clair Stadium	26,898
2	2	Thu, July 4	at Edmonton Eskimos	L 24–40	0–2	Commonwealth Stadium	30,152
3	3	Thu, July 11	vs. Winnipeg Blue Bombers	W 25–24	1–2	Frank Clair Stadium	22,436
4	4	Wed, July 17	at Winnipeg Blue Bombers	L 7–55	1–3	Canad Inns Stadium	26,671
5	5	Thu, July 25	vs. Hamilton Tiger-Cats	W 38–37	2–3	Frank Clair Stadium	24,335
6	6	Thu, Aug 1	at Toronto Argonauts	L 8–24	2–4	SkyDome	18,734
7	7	Thu, Aug 8	vs. Montreal Alouettes	L 6–29	2–5	Frank Clair Stadium	26,331
8	8	Thu, Aug 15	at BC Lions	L 18–22	2–6	BC Place Stadium	15,258
9	9	Thu, Aug 22	at Hamilton Tiger-Cats	L 9–30	2–7	Ivor Wynne Stadium	15,249
10	10	Fri, Aug 30	vs. BC Lions	L 4–28	2–8	Frank Clair Stadium	22,343
11	11	Sat, Sept 7	vs. Toronto Argonauts	L 25–30	2–9	Frank Clair Stadium	21,604
12	12	Sat, Sept 14	at Calgary Stampeders	W 26–12	3–9	McMahon Stadium	31,891
13	13	Sun, Sept 22	vs. Calgary Stampeders	26-22 (OT)	3–10	Frank Clair Stadium	23,136
14	14	Sat, Sept 28	vs. Saskatchewan Roughriders	L 11–29	3–11	Taylor Field	20,098
15	15	Mon, Oct 6	vs. Edmonton Eskimos	L 34–37	3–12	Frank Clair Stadium	20,576
16	Bye						
17	16	Sun, Oct 20	at Toronto Argonauts	L 12–29	3–13	SkyDome	24,932
18	17	Sat, Oct 26	vs. Montreal Alouettes	L 34–43	3–14	Frank Clair Stadium	26,411
19	18	Sun, Nov 3	at Montreal Alouettes	W 26–25	4–14	Molson Stadium	20,002

== Roster ==
2002 Ottawa Renegades final roster
Quarterbacks: 10 Chuck Clements; 9 Dan Crowley; 16 Oteman Sampson; Running backs: 20 Mark Nohra; 30 Josh Ranek; 21 Marcelous Turner; 35 Mike Vilimek; Receivers: 5 Aubrey Cummings; 82 D. J. Flick; 80 Malcolm Johnson; 89 Denis Montana; 85 Jimmy Oliver; 8 Grayson Shillingford; 86 Nigel Williams	Offensive linemen: 67 Mike Abou-Mechrek G; 55 Chris Burns G; 53 David De La Perralle T; 64 Seth Dittman T; 66 Alexandre Gauthier T; 52 George Hudson C/G; Defensive linemen: 56 Keaton Cromartie DE; 91 John Frank DE; 99 Jerome Haywood DT; 98 Mike Moten DE; 97 Pene Talamaivao DT; 90 Clinton Wayne DT	Linebackers: 2 Donnavan Carter; 50 Steve Glenn; 7 John Grace; 6 Jason Kralt; 1 Kelly Wiltshire; Defensive backs: 21 Byron Capers; 32 Frantz Clarkson; 22 Shawn Gallant; 15 Donte Gamble; 29 George McCullough; 23 Alphonso Roundtree; 3 Donnie Ruiz; 39 Gerald Vaughn	Special teams: 18 Glenn Harper P; 17 Lawrence Tynes K; Injured list: 92 Michael Boireau DE; 51 Carl Coulter C; 28 Darren Davis RB; 44 Derrick Ford DE; 24 Darren Joseph RB; 81 Andre Kirwan WR; 19 Mike Maurer FB; 31 Vernon Mitchell DB; 38 Mark Robichaud LB; 57 Val St. Germain G; 58 David Thomas LB; Italics indicate American player

== Awards and honours ==
- Ricky Bell, Cornerback, CFLPA All-Star
- Michael Boireau, Defensive End, CFLPA All-Star
- John Grace, Linebacker, CFL All-Star
- John Grace, Linebacker, CFL Eastern All-Star
- John Grace, Linebacker, CFLPA All-Star
- Jimmy Oliver, Wide Receiver, CFL Eastern All-Star
- Val St. Germain, Offensive Tackle, CFLPA Eastern All-Star
- Gerald Vaughn, Halfback, CFLPA All-Star
