= 2002 Hamilton Tiger-Cats season =

Season of Canadian Football League team the Hamilton Tiger-Cats

- Head coach: Ron Lancaster
- Home stadium: Ivor Wynne Stadium

Results
- Record: 7–11
- Division place: 3rd, East
- Playoffs: did not qualify
- Team MOP: Troy Davis
- Team MOC: Rob Hitchcock
- Team MOR: Tony Miles

Uniform

The 2002 Hamilton Tiger-Cats season was the 45th season for the team in the Canadian Football League (CFL) and their 53rd overall. The Tiger-Cats finished in third place in the East Division with a 7–11 record and missed the playoffs for the first time since 1997. Despite having a 6–3 record at home, the Ti-Cats were 1–8 in away games, claiming that win in their last away game of the season.

== Offseason ==
=== CFL draft ===
Rd	Pick	Player	Position	School
1	7	John Macdonald	DL	McGill
2	16	Jake Roberts	OL	Simon Fraser
3	25	Doug Borden	DT	Saint Mary's
4	34	Jamie Elliot	WR	Calgary
5	43	Scott Coe	LB	Manitoba
6	52	Kenneth Vermette	RB	Manitoba

=== Preseason ===
Week	Date	Opponent	Score	Result	Record
B	June 13	vs. Montreal Alouettes	37–26	Loss	0–1
C	June 21	at Toronto Argonauts	37–17	Win	1–1

== Roster ==
2002 Hamilton Tiger-Cats final roster
Quarterbacks: 1 Pete Gonzalez; 14 Danny McManus; 8 Butchie Washington; Running backs: 35 Randy Bowles; 32 Troy Davis; 37 Duane Forde; 34 Jarrett Smith; Receivers: 81 Tony Akins; 9 Archie Amerson; 87 Andrew English; 82 Darren Flutie; 89 Andrew Grigg; 13 Tony Miles; 86 Trevor Shaw	Offensive linemen: 50 Pascal Cheron G; 69 Jerry Crafts T; 64 Ryan Donnelly T; 68 Dave Hack T; 65 Paul Lambert C; 66 Mike Mihelic G; 54 Mark Verbeek C; Defensive linemen: 53 Lamont Bryant DE; 49 Tim Cheatwood DE; 98 Larry Fitzpatrick DT; 92 Karim Grant DE; 91 John Macdonald DT; 99 Daaron McField DT	Linebackers: 56 Scott Coe; 52 Haven Fields; 17 Sean Woodson; Defensive backs: 25 Duane Butler; 22 Steve Fisher; 31 Brandon Hamilton; 42 Rob Hitchcock; 26 Dedric Mathis; 6 Troy Saunders; 30 Chris Shelling; 7 Kyle Walters; Special teams: 3 Paul Osbaldiston K/P	Injured list: 2 Curtis Alexander RB; 55 Steve Alexandre DE; 67 Gary Brown G; 51 Samir Chahine G; 57 Sedric Clark DE; 75 Tom Hipsz DT; 38 Ron Merkerson LB; 47 Warren Muzika LB; 4 Marcus Spencer LB; Italics indicate American players

== Regular season ==
=== Season standings ===
East Division
Pos	Team	Pld	W	T	L	OTL	PF	PA	PD	Pts
1	Montreal Alouettes (C, Q)	18	13	0	4	1	587	407	+180	27
2	Toronto Argonauts (Q)	18	8	0	10	0	344	482	−138	16
3	Hamilton Tiger-Cats	18	7	0	10	1	427	524	−97	15
4	Ottawa Renegades	18	4	0	12	2	356	550	−194	10

Source: "CFL.ca". Archived from the original on 2009-06-29.
(C) First round bye; (Q) Qualified for playoffs

=== Schedule ===
Week	Date	Opponent	Score	Result	Record
1	June 29	vs. BC Lions	27–15	Win	1–0
2	July 5	at Winnipeg Blue Bombers	24–15	Loss	1–1
3	July 12	vs. Calgary Stampeders	34–31	Win	2–1
4	July 18	at BC Lions	51–21	Loss	2–2
5	July 25	at Ottawa Renegades	38–37	Loss	2–3
6	Aug 1	vs. Saskatchewan Roughriders	34–31(OT)	Win	3–3
7	Aug 7	at Edmonton Eskimos	33–5	Loss	3–4
7	Aug 11	at Saskatchewan Roughriders	30–14	Loss	3–5
8	Bye				
9	Aug 22	vs. Ottawa Renegades	30–9	Win	4–5
10	Sept 2	vs. Toronto Argonauts	22–13	Win	5–5
11	Sept 8	at Montreal Alouettes	32–30	Loss	5–6
12	Sept 15	vs. Montreal Alouettes	35–28	Win	6–6
13	Sept 22	at Toronto Argonauts	28–21	Loss	6–7
14	Sept 29	vs. Edmonton Eskimos	34–33	Loss	6–8
15	Oct 4	at Calgary Stampeders	43–5	Loss	6–9
16	Oct 14	vs. Toronto Argonauts	28–27(OT)	Loss	6–10–0–1
17	Oct 20	at Montreal Alouettes	29–26	Win	7–10–0–1
18	Oct 27	vs. Winnipeg Blue Bombers	28–7	Loss	7–11–0–1
19	Bye				
