= 2002 Saskatchewan Roughriders season =

CFL team season

- General manager: Roy Shivers
- Head coach: Danny Barrett
- Home stadium: Taylor Field

Results
- Record: 8–10–0–2
- Division place: 4th, West
- Playoffs: Lost East Semi-Final
- Team MOP: Corey Holmes
- Team MOC: Chris Szarka
- Team MOR: Donald Heaven

Uniform

The 2002 Saskatchewan Roughriders finished in fourth place in the West Division with an 8–10–0–2 record in the final season where overtime losses counted in the standings. They crossed over to the East Division and played against the Toronto Argonauts and lost in the East Semi-Final 24–14. It was the first time they had made the playoffs since their Grey Cup run in 1997.

== Offseason ==
=== CFL draft ===
Round	Pick	Player	Position	School/Club team
2	15	Francois Boulianne	Offensive lineman	Laval
3	20	Patrick Thibeault	Slotback	Saint Mary's
4	29	Darnell Edwards	Cornerback	Manitoba
5	38	Gonzalo Segovia	Defensive tackle	Eastern Illinois
6	47	Curtis Nash	Defensive back	Saint Mary's

=== Preseason ===
Week	Date	Opponent	Score	Result	Attendance	Record
A	Sat, June 8	at Winnipeg Blue Bombers	22–6	Loss	28,044	0–1
B	Fri, June 14	vs. Edmonton Eskimos	27–24	Win	19,614	1–1

== Regular season ==
=== Season standings ===
West Division
Pos	Team	Pld	W	L	T	OTL	PF	PA	PD	Pts
1	Edmonton Eskimos (C, Q)	18	13	5	0	0	516	450	+66	26
2	Winnipeg Blue Bombers (Q)	18	12	6	0	0	566	421	+145	24
3	BC Lions (Q)	18	10	8	0	0	480	399	+81	20
4	Saskatchewan Roughriders (Q)	18	8	8	0	2	435	393	+42	18
5	Calgary Stampeders	18	6	10	0	2	438	509	−71	14

Source: "CFL.ca". Archived from the original on 2009-06-29.
(C) First round bye; (Q) Qualified for playoffs

=== Season schedule ===
Week	Date	Opponent	Score	Result	Attendance	Record
1	Fri, June 28	at Ottawa Renegades	30-27 (OT)	Win	26,898	1–0
2	Fri, July 5	vs. Calgary Stampeders	32–21	Win	21,968	2–0
3	Thurs, July 11	at Montreal Alouettes	26–20	Loss	20,202	2–1
4	Fri, July 19	vs. Edmonton Eskimos	45–11	Win	25,149	3–1
5	Thurs, July 25	at Calgary Stampeders	26–21	Loss	35,597	3–2
6	Thurs, Aug 1	at Hamilton Tiger-Cats	34-31 (OT)	Loss	15,369	3–3–0–1
7	Sun, Aug 11	vs. Hamilton Tiger-Cats	30–14	Win	23,889	4–3–0–1
8	Fri, Aug 16	at Toronto Argonauts	18–10	Loss	19,652	4–4–0–1
9	Sun, Aug 25	vs. Montreal Alouettes	23–9	Loss	23,212	4–5–0–1
10	Sun, Sept 1	vs. Winnipeg Blue Bombers	33–19	Win	30,220	5–5–0–1
11	Bye					
12	Sun, Sept 15	vs. Toronto Argonauts	40–11	Win	24,387	6–5–0–1
13	Sat, Sept 21	at Edmonton Eskimos	31–25	Loss	44,480	6–6–0–1
14	Sat, Sept 28	vs. Ottawa Renegades	29–11	Win	20,098	7–6–0–1
15	Sun, Oct 6	vs. Winnipeg Blue Bombers	35-32 (OT)	Loss	24,157	7–7–0–2
16	Sat, Oct 12	at Winnipeg Blue Bombers	20–11	Loss	29,053	7–8–0–2
17	Sat, Oct 19	vs. BC Lions	13–11	Win	24,957	8–8–0–2
18	Fri, Oct 25	at Edmonton Eskimos	27–21	Loss	34,101	8–9–0–2
19	Fri, Nov 1	at BC Lions	28–3	Loss	25,929	8–10–0–2

# Games played with primary home uniforms.
# Games played with primary white uniforms.
# Games played with black uniforms.

== Roster ==
2002 Saskatchewan Roughriders final roster
Quarterbacks: 12 Ian Butler; 5 Kevin Glenn; 15 Nealon Greene; Running backs: 32 Simon Baffoe; 19 Corey Holmes; 25 Sedrick Shaw; 33 Chris Szarka; Receivers: 6 Derick Armstrong; 22 Dylan Ching; 87 Jason French; 89 Corey Grant; 82 Lloyd Henry; 8 Brian Roberson; 85 Patrick Thibeault	Offensive linemen: 59 Jocelyn Frenette C; 64 Shawn Gifford T; 52 Donald Heaven G; 66 Rob Lazeo G; 60 Gene Makowsky T; 54 Jeremy O'Day C/T; Defensive linemen: 98 Nathan Davis DT; 50 Ray Jacobs DE; 92 Sheldon Napastuk DT; 58 Shonte Peoples DE; 96 Scott Schultz DT; 79 Tyson St. James DE	Linebackers: 9 Reggie Hunt; 37 Terrence Melton; 48 Trevis Smith; 38 George White; Defensive backs: 31 Davin Bush; 29 Eddie Davis; 26 Scott Gordon; 21 Jason Mallett; 1 LaDouphyous McCalla; 3 Omarr Morgan; 20 Kennedy Nkeyasen; 27 Jabir Walker	Special teams: 4 Paul McCallum K/P; 35 Chris Cvetkovic LS; Injured list: 95 Andre Brown DE; 11 Darnell Edwards DB; 2 Omar Evans DB; 68 Andrew Greene G; 7 Quincy Jackson SB; 24 Jackie Mitchell DB; 57 Andrew Moore G; 94 Chris White DT; Suspended: Willie Washington DB; Italics indicate American player

== Awards and records ==
- CFL's Special Teams Player of the Year – Corey Holmes

=== CFL All-Star selections ===
- Derick Armstrong, Receiver
- Corey Holmes, Special Teams
- Omarr Morgan, Cornerback

=== Western All-Star selections ===
- Derick Armstrong, Receiver
- Corey Holmes, Special Teams
- Omarr Morgan, Cornerback

== Playoffs ==
=== East Semi-Final ===
Team	Q1	Q2	Q3	Q4	Total
Saskatchewan Roughriders	3	9	0	2	14
Toronto Argonauts	0	7	7	10	24
