= 2002 Montreal Alouettes season =

Canadian football team season

- Head coach: Don Matthews
- Home stadium: Molson Stadium

Results
- Record: 13–5–0–1
- Division place: 1st, East
- Playoffs: Won Grey Cup

Uniform

The 2002 Montreal Alouettes finished in first place in the East Division with a 13–5–0–1 record. The Alouettes hired coach Don Matthews, after a terrible ending to the 2001 season. They defeated the Toronto Argonauts 35–18 in the East Final to advance to the Grey Cup. They met their most frequent Grey Cup partner, the Edmonton Eskimos, in front of a loud, cold, hometown Eskimo crowd, they won 25–16, winning their first championship since 1977, when they defeated these same Edmonton Eskimos in the famous Ice Bowl at Olympic Stadium.

== Offseason ==
=== CFL draft ===
Round	Pick	Player	Position	School/Club team
1	5	Patrick Dorvelus	CB	Hofstra
2	14	Sherko Haji-Rasouli	OL	Miami
2	18	Josh Jansen	LB	Occidental College
3	27	Aaron Fiacconi	OL	Mansfield
4	35	Johnathan Landon	DL	Queen's
5	44	Mitch Sutherland	DL	Alberta

== Preseason ==
Week	Date	Opponent	Venue	Score	Result	Attendance	Record
B	June 13	at Hamilton Tiger-Cats	Ivor Wynne Stadium	37–26	Win	19,035	1–0
C	June 20	Ottawa Renegades	Molson Stadium	36–6	Win	19,120	2–0

== Regular season ==
=== Season standings ===
East Division
Pos	Team	Pld	W	L	T	OTL	PF	PA	PD	Pts
1	Montreal Alouettes (C, Q)	18	13	4	0	1	587	407	+180	27
2	Toronto Argonauts (Q)	18	8	10	0	0	344	482	−138	16
3	Hamilton Tiger-Cats	18	7	10	0	1	427	524	−97	15
4	Ottawa Renegades	18	4	12	0	2	356	550	−194	10

Source: "CFL.ca". Archived from the original on 2009-06-29.
(C) First round bye; (Q) Qualified for playoffs

=== Season schedule ===
Week	Date	Opponent	Venue	Score	Result	Attendance	Record
1	June 25	BC Lions	Molson Stadium	27–20	Win	19,628	1–0
2	July 3	at Toronto Argonauts	SkyDome	28–12	Win	21,175	2–0
3	July 11	Saskatchewan Roughriders	Molson Stadium	26–20	Win	20,002	3–0
4	July 18	at Calgary Stampeders	McMahon Stadium	37–20	Win	32,018	4–0
5	July 27	Winnipeg Blue Bombers	Molson Stadium	31–22	Win	20,002	5–0
6	Aug 2	Edmonton Eskimos	Molson Stadium	37–14	Win	20,002	6–0
7	Aug 8	at Ottawa Renegades	Frank Clair Stadium	29–6	Win	26,221	7–0
8	Aug 15	Calgary Stampeders	Molson Stadium	38–23	Win	20,002	8–0
9	Aug 21	at BC Lions	BC Place Stadium	48–37	Loss	17,221	8–1
9	Aug 25	at Saskatchewan Roughriders	Taylor Field	23–9	Win	23,212	9–1
10	Bye						
11	Sept 8	Hamilton Tiger-Cats	Molson Stadium	32–30	Win	20,002	10–1
12	Sept 15	at Hamilton Tiger-Cats	Ivor Wynne Stadium	35–28 (OT)	Loss	15,061	10–2–0
13	Sept 20	at Winnipeg Blue Bombers	Canad Inns Stadium	27–24	Loss	29,503	10–3–0
14	Sept 29	Toronto Argonauts	Molson Stadium	38–3	Win	20,002	11–3–0
15	Bye						
16	Oct 14	at Edmonton Eskimos	Commonwealth Stadium	48–30	Win	36,255	12–3–0
17	Oct 20	Hamilton Tiger-Cats	Molson Stadium	29–26	Loss	20,002	12–4–0
18	Oct 26	at Ottawa Renegades	Frank Clair Stadium	43–34	Win	26,411	13–4–0
19	Nov 3	Ottawa Renegades	Molson Stadium	26–25	Loss	20,002	13–5–0

== Roster ==
2002 Montreal Alouettes final roster
Quarterbacks: 13 Anthony Calvillo; 15 Eric Kresser; Running backs: 4 Thomas Haskins; 33 Bruno Heppell; 11 Lawrence Phillips; Receivers: 86 Ben Cahoon; 80 Jeremaine Copeland; 3 Sylvain Girard; 83 Darran Hall; 39 Harvey Stables; 6 Keith Stokes; 16 Pat Woodcock	Offensive linemen: 68 Bryan Chiu C; 57 Scott Flory G; 66 Neal Fort T; 65 Kevin Lefsrud G; 53 Uzooma Okeke T; Defensive linemen: 78 Adriano Belli DT; 94 Robert Brown DT; 34 Tim Fleiszer DE; 99 Reggie Lowe DE; 54 Marc Megna DE; 91 Mat Petz DE; 75 Ed Philion DT; 93 Jason Richards DT; 58 Anwar Stewart DE	Linebackers: 17 Patrick Dorvélus; 44 Kevin Johnson; 47 Stefen Reid; Defensive backs: 20 Perry Carter; 26 Danny Derricott; 8 Reggie Durden; 35 Stéphane Fortin; 18 Will Loftus; 9 Wayne Shaw; 38 Tim Strickland; 23 Mark Washington; Special teams: 10 Terry Baker K/P	Injured list: 1 Tavares Bolden QB; 64 Rick Cunningham T; 96 Phil Gibson DT; 5 Éric Lapointe RB; 31 Barron Miles DB; 27 Mike Pringle RB; 46 Sean Spender LB; Italics indicate International player

== Playoffs ==
=== Scotiabank East Final ===
Team	Q1	Q2	Q3	Q4	Total
Toronto Argonauts	3	6	0	9	18
Montreal Alouettes	14	7	4	10	35

=== Grey Cup ===
Team	Q1	Q2	Q3	Q4	Total
Montreal Alouettes	1	10	0	14	25
Edmonton Eskimos	0	0	10	6	16

== Awards ==
=== 2002 CFL All-Star Selections ===
- Anthony Calvillo – Quarterback
- Uzooma Okeke – Offensive Tackle
- Scott Flory – Offensive Guard
- Bryan Chiu – Centre
- Barron Miles – Defensive Back

=== 2002 CFL Eastern All-Star Selections ===
- Anthony Calvillo – Quarterback
- Ben Cahoon – Slotback
- Pat Woodcock – Wide Receiver
- Lawrence Phillips – Running Back
- Marlion Jackson - Running Back
- Uzooma Okeke – Offensive Tackle
- Scott Flory – Offensive Guard
- Bryan Chiu – Centre
- Marc Megna – Defensive End
- Robert Brown – Defensive Tackle
- Kevin Johnson – Linebacker
- Stefen Reid – Linebacker
- Barron Miles – Defensive Back
- Wayne Shaw – Cornerback
- Keith Stokes – Special Teams
