= 2002 BC Lions season =

Canadian football team season

- Owner: David Braley
- General manager: Adam Rita
- President: Bob Ackles
- Head coach: Steve Buratto; Adam Rita (Interim)
- Home stadium: BC Place Stadium

Results
- Record: 10–8
- Division place: 3rd, West
- Playoffs: Lost West Semi-Final

Uniform

The 2002 BC Lions finished in third place in the West Division with a 10–8 record. After beginning the season with a 1–5 record, general manager Adam Rita fired head coach Steve Buratto and coached the team on an interim basis for the rest of the year. He guided the group to a 9–3 turnaround which led to an appearance in the West-Semi Final. Despite the turnaround, Rita was fired as general manager/coach after the playoff loss.

== Offseason ==
=== CFL draft ===
Rd	Pick	Player	Position	School
1	4	Jason Clermont	SB	Regina
1	6	Paul Cheng	DE	SFU
2	17	Brett Romberg	OL	Miami
3	22	Chris Gayton	LB	Kentucky
4	31	John Williams	RB	Edinboro
5	41	Atnas Maeko	WR	St. Mary's
6	53	Joel Orel	WR	Manitoba

== Preseason ==
Week	Date	Opponent	Score	Result	Record
B	June 12	at Calgary Stampeders	24–8	Loss	0–1
C	June 18	vs. Winnipeg Blue Bombers	27–4	Win	1–1

== Regular season ==
=== Season standings ===
West Division
Pos	Team	Pld	W	T	L	OTL	PF	PA	PD	Pts
1	Edmonton Eskimos (C, Q)	18	13	0	5	0	516	450	+66	26
2	Winnipeg Blue Bombers (Q)	18	12	0	6	0	566	421	+145	24
3	BC Lions (Q)	18	10	0	8	0	480	399	+81	20
4	Saskatchewan Roughriders (Q)	18	8	0	8	2	435	393	+42	18
5	Calgary Stampeders	18	6	0	10	2	438	509	−71	14

Source: "CFL.ca". Archived from the original on 2009-06-29.
(C) First round bye; (Q) Qualified for playoffs

=== Season schedule ===
Week	Date	Opponent	Score	Result	Record
1	June 25	at Montreal Alouettes	27–21	Loss	0–1
1	June 29	at Hamilton Tiger-Cats	27–15	Loss	0–2
2	Bye				0–2
3	July 9	vs. Toronto Argonauts	30–22	Loss	0–3
4	July 18	vs. Hamilton Tiger-Cats	51–21	Win	1–3
5	July 26	at Edmonton Eskimos	37–27	Loss	1–4
6	August 1	vs. Calgary Stampeders	23–15	Loss	1–5
7	August 9	at Winnipeg Blue Bombers	29–21	Win	2–5
8	August 15	vs. Ottawa Renegades	22–18	Win	3–5
9	August 21	vs. Montreal Alouettes	48–37	Win	4–5
10	August 30	at Ottawa Renegades	28–4	Win	5–5
11	Sept 8	at Winnipeg Blue Bombers	44–28	Loss	5–6
12	Sept 13	vs. Edmonton Eskimos	23–18	Win	6–6
13	Bye				6–6
14	Sept 27	Winnipeg Blue Bombers	38–28	Win	7–6
15	Oct 5	at Toronto Argonauts	23–18	Win	8–6
16	Oct 11	vs. Calgary Stampeders	37–14	Win	9–6
17	Oct 20	at Saskatchewan Roughriders	13–11	Loss	9–7
18	Oct 26	at Calgary Stampeders	16–15	Loss	9–8
19	Nov 1	vs. Saskatchewan Roughriders	28–3	Win	10–8

== Player stats ==
=== Passing ===
Player	Att.	Comp	%	Yards	TD	INT	Rating
Damon Allen	474	268	56.5	3987	22	10	90.9
Rickey Foggie	36	13	36.1	235	1	3	–
Geroy Simon	1	1	100.0	71	1	0	158.3
Ortege Jenkins	5	1	20.0	42	0	1	–
Gus Ornstein	2	1	50.0	12	0	0	–

=== Rushing ===
Player	Att.	Yards	Avg.	Longest	TD
Sean Millington	170	740	4.4	37	14
Damon Allen	70	479	6.8	22	4
Lyle Green	60	343	5.7	29	3
Willie Hurst	55	288	5.2	31	1
Chris Wright	25	82	3.3	12	0

=== Receiving ===
Player	No.	Yards	Avg.	Long	TD
Ryan Thelwell	48	815	17.0	53	5
Alfred Jackson	39	785	20.1	109	7
Geroy Simon	50	754	15.1	42	2
Jason Clermont	46	735	16.0	41	6
Bret Anderson	28	406	14.6	33	1

== Awards and records ==
- Jason Clermont, Outstanding Rookie

=== 2002 CFL All-Stars ===
- Brendan Ayanbadejo, Linebacker
- Eric Carter, Cornerback
- Barrin Simpson, Linebacker

=== Western Division All-Star Selections ===
- Brendan Ayanbadejo, Linebacker
- Eric Carter, Cornerback
- Steve Hardin, Offensive Guard
- Carl Kidd, Linebacker
- Derick (Bo) Lewis, Defensive Back
- Herman Smith, Defensive End
- Barrin Simpson, Linebacker
- Jamie Taras, Centre

== Playoffs ==
=== West Semi-Final ===
Team	Q1	Q2	Q3	Q4	Total
Winnipeg Blue Bombers	10	0	10	10	30
BC Lions	3	0	0	0	3

== Roster ==
2002 BC Lions final roster
Quarterbacks: 9 Damon Allen; 12 Rickey Foggie; 19 Gus Ornstein; Running backs: 28 Lyle Green; 33 Willie Hurst; 25 Sean Millington; 24 John Williams; Receivers: 8 Bret Anderson K; 82 Jason Clermont; 7 Alfred Jackson; 81 Geroy Simon; 84 Ryan Thelwell	Offensive linemen: 59 Kelly Bates G; 61 Steve Hardin T; 54 Jermese Jones T; 57 Dan Payne T; 64 Angus Reid C; 60 Jamie Taras G; Defensive linemen: 92 Noah Cantor DT; 97 Brent Johnson DE; 95 Cameron Legault DT; 56 Craig Powell DE; 91 Herman Smith DE; 96 Tyrone Williams DT; Special teams: 14 Matt Kellett K; 11 Tony Martino P	Linebackers: 6 Brendon Ayanbadejo; 26 Carl Kidd; 44 Kelly Lochbaum; 50 Kojo Millington; 20 Ron Ockimey; 51 Barrin Simpson; Defensive backs: 2 Eric Carter; 10 Jason Crumb; 37 Mike Crumb; 31 Brandon Godsey; 27 Toya Jones; 17 Bo Lewis; 23 Manny Martin; 39 Tony Walker	Injured list: 22 David Byrd DB; 3 Sedrick Curry DB; 55 Ben Fairbrother G; 68 Cory Mantyka G; 65 John Oddonetto T; 27 Anthony Prior DB; 1 Tyrone Taylor WR; 69 Wes White T; 4 Chris Wright RB; Suspended: Dave Tucker LB; Leif Thorsen G; Joe Orel WR; Italics indicate International player
