= Jim Daley =

Canadian gridiron football coach

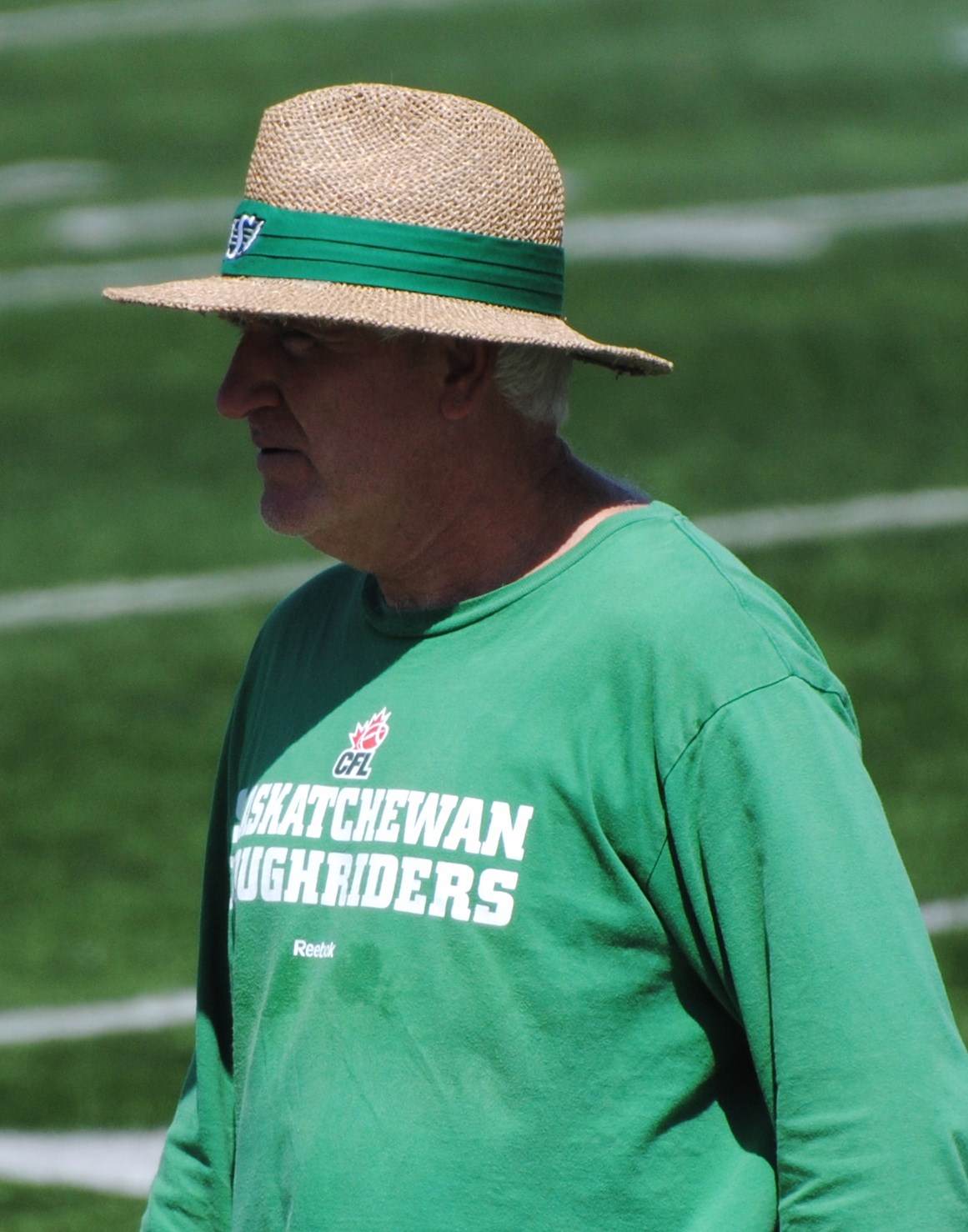
- Daley with the Saskatchewan Roughriders in 2010

St. Francis Xavier X-Men
- Title: Special Teams Coordinator

Personal information
- Born: July 15, 1951; Ottawa, Ontario, Canada

Career history
- 1982–1984: Ottawa Sooners (HC)
- 1985–1990: Ottawa Gee-Gees (HC)
- 1991: Ottawa Rough Riders (STC/RB)
- 1992–1993: Ottawa Rough Riders (STC)
- 1993: Ottawa Rough Riders (DLC)
- 1994–1995: Saskatchewan Roughriders (DC)
- 1996–1998: Saskatchewan Roughriders (HC)
- 2000–2002: Calgary Stampeders (DLC)
- 2003: Calgary Stampeders (DC/LB)
- 2004: Winnipeg Blue Bombers (STC/DLC)
- 2004–2005: Winnipeg Blue Bombers (HC)
- 2009: Edmonton Eskimos (DC)
- 2010: Saskatchewan Roughriders (STC)
- 2012: Hamilton Tiger-Cats (STC)
- 2014: Toronto Argonauts (STC)
- 2015–present: St. Francis Xavier X-Men (STC)

Awards and highlights
- Grey Cup champion (2001)

Jim Daley (born July 15, 1951) is a Canadian football coach, who currently serves as the special teams coordinator and assistant head coach for the St. Francis Xavier X-Men football team. He has previously coached in the Canadian Football League from 1990 to 2014, including as head coach for the Saskatchewan Roughriders and Winnipeg Blue Bombers. He has also been the head coach for the Ottawa Gee-Gees and Ottawa Sooners. He won a national championship as head coach of the Sooners in 1984 and a Grey Cup championship in 2001 as an assistant coach.

== Coaching career ==
Daley served as the head coach for the Ottawa Sooners from 1982 to 1984 where he led the team to a national championship in 1984. He was then hired as the head coach for the Ottawa Gee-Gees in 1985 and served in that role until 1990.

Daley started his CFL coaching career as the special teams coordinator for the Ottawa Rough Riders in 1991. In 1993 he moved from ST co-ordinator to DL coach. He quit during the season over management's insistence to play former NFL start Dexter Manley at DE over Lybrant Robinson. In 1994 he was hired by Saskatchewan to coach the linebackers and was promoted to defensive coordinator in 1995. In 1996, he was named the team's head coach. He served as the team's head coach from 1996 to 1998, where he finished with a losing record in each of his three seasons as coach, but was able to lead the team to the 1997 Grey Cup game, where they lost to the Toronto Argonauts 47–23.

Daley joined the Calgary Stampeders in 2000 as the team's defensive line coach and won his first Grey Cup championship in 2001 when the team defeated the Winnipeg Blue Bombers in the 89th Grey Cup. He served as an assistant coach with the Stampeders for four seasons.

In 2004, Daley joined the Winnipeg Blue Bombers as the team's special teams coordinator and defensive line coach. He became interim head coach after Dave Ritchie was fired part way through the 2004 season. He finished the season with a 5–6 record, but the team missed the playoffs. He was named the full-time head coach for the 2005 season, but was dismissed at the end of the year as the team finished in last place in the Western Conference.

In 2007, Daley was hired by the CFL as a league official to work as senior director of officiating development. In 2009, Daley was hired by the Edmonton Eskimos as the team's defensive coordinator and defensive line coach. Shortly following the 2009 season on December 9, 2009, Daley later resigned from his position.

On February 18, 2010, it was announced that Daley had re-joined the Saskatchewan Roughriders, this time as their special teams coordinator. He coached in the 98th Grey Cup, but the team lost to the Montreal Alouettes. It was announced on January 14, 2011, that his contract would not be renewed by the Roughriders.

On February 3, 2012, it was announced that Daley had joined the Hamilton Tiger-Cats' coaching staff as their special teams coordinator.

Daley became the special teams coordinator of the Toronto Argonauts for the 2014 season. In January 2015, he had to turn down an offer to return for the 2015 season as Toronto's special teams coordinator for personal and health reasons.

On June 5, 2015, the St. Francis Xavier X-Men announced that Daley was going to join the team's coaching staff as their special teams coordinator for the 2015 season. 2024 marked his ninth season in this position.

== CFL coaching record ==
Team	Year	Regular season					Postseason		
Team	Year	Won	Lost	Ties	Win %	Finish	Won	Lost	Result
SSK	1996	5	13	0	.278	4th in West Division	–	–	Missed playoffs
SSK	1997	8	10	0	.454	3rd in West Division	2	1	Lost in Grey Cup
SSK	1998	5	13	0	.278	4th in West Division	–	–	Missed playoffs
WPG	2004	5	6	0	.454	4th in West Division	–	–	Missed playoffs
WPG	2005	5	13	0	.278	5th in West Division	–	–	Missed playoffs
Total		28	52	0	.350	0 West Division; Championships	2	1	0 Grey Cups
