= 2002 Edmonton Eskimos season =

Canadian football team season

- General manager: Tom Higgins
- Head coach: Tom Higgins
- Home stadium: Commonwealth Stadium

Results
- Record: 13–5
- Division place: 1st, West
- Playoffs: Lost Grey Cup
- Team MOP: John Avery, RB
- Team MOC: Sean Fleming P/K
- Team MOR: Kelvin Powell, LB

Uniform

The 2002 Edmonton Eskimos finished first in the West Division with a 13–5 record, but lost the Grey Cup at Commonwealth Stadium to the Montreal Alouettes.

== Offseason ==
=== CFL draft ===
Round	Pick	Player	Position	School/Club team
3	24	Dahrran Diedrick	RB	Nebraska
5	42	Olanzo Jarrett	DE	Toledo
6	51	Andrew Dubiellak	WR	UNLV

== Preseason ==
=== Schedule ===
#	Date	Visitor	Score	Home	OT	Attendance
A	Bye					
B	June 14	Edmonton Eskimos	24–27	Saskatchewan Roughriders		19,614
C	June 20	Calgary Stampeders	41–52	Edmonton Eskimos		33,107

== Regular season ==
=== Season standings ===
West Division
Pos	Team	Pld	W	L	T	OTL	PF	PA	PD	Pts
1	Edmonton Eskimos (C, Q)	18	13	5	0	0	516	450	+66	26
2	Winnipeg Blue Bombers (Q)	18	12	6	0	0	566	421	+145	24
3	BC Lions (Q)	18	10	8	0	0	480	399	+81	20
4	Saskatchewan Roughriders (Q)	18	8	8	0	2	435	393	+42	18
5	Calgary Stampeders	18	6	10	0	2	438	509	−71	14

Source: "CFL.ca". Archived from the original on 2009-06-29.
(C) First round bye; (Q) Qualified for playoffs

=== Season schedule ===
Week	Date	Visitor	Score	Home	OT	Attendance	Record	Pts
1	June 28	Edmonton Eskimos	27–21	Calgary Stampeders		33,584	1–0–0	2
2	July 4	Ottawa Renegades	24–40	Edmonton Eskimos		30,152	2–0–0	4
3	July 13	Toronto Argonauts	17–31	Edmonton Eskimos		33,108	3–0–0	6
4	July 19	Edmonton Eskimos	11–45	Saskatchewan Roughriders		25,149	3–1–0	6
5	July 26	BC Lions	27–37	Edmonton Eskimos		32,844	4–1–0	8
6	Aug 2	Edmonton Eskimos	14–37	Montreal Alouettes		20,002	4–2–0	6
7	Aug 7	Hamilton Tiger-Cats	5–33	Edmonton Eskimos		38,852	5–2–0	10
8	Aug 15	Winnipeg Blue Bombers	32–35	Edmonton Eskimos		32,174	6–2–0	12
9	Aug 23	Edmonton Eskimos	30–7	Toronto Argonauts		23,642	7–2–0	14
10	Sept 2	Edmonton Eskimos	28–20	Calgary Stampeders		35,967	8–2–0	16
11	Sept 6	Calgary Stampeders	11–45	Edmonton Eskimos		61,481	9–2–0	18
12	Sept 13	Edmonton Eskimos	18–23	BC Lions		21,886	9–3–0	18
13	Sept 21	Saskatchewan Roughriders	25–31	Edmonton Eskimos		44,480	10–3–0	20
14	Sept 29	Edmonton Eskimos	34–33	Hamilton Tiger-Cats		16,054	11–3–0	22
15	Oct 6	Edmonton Eskimos	37–34	Ottawa Renegades		20,576	12–3–0	24
16	Oct 14	Montreal Alouettes	48–30	Edmonton Eskimos		36,255	12–4–0	24
17	Bye						12–4–0	24
18	Oct 25	Saskatchewan Roughriders	21–27	Edmonton Eskimos		34,101	13–4–0	26
19	Nov 2	Edmonton Eskimos	8–20	Winnipeg Blue Bombers		28,780	13–5–0	26

Total attendance: 343,447
Average attendance: 38,161 (63.5%)

== Playoffs ==
Week	Date	Visitor	Score	Home	OT	Attendance
Division Final	Nov 17	Winnipeg Blue Bombers	30–33	Edmonton Eskimos		34,322
Grey Cup	Nov 24	Montreal Alouettes	25–16	Edmonton Eskimos		62,531*

*Top attendance in CFL

=== West Final ===
Team	Q1	Q2	Q3	Q4	Total
Winnipeg Blue Bombers	?	?	?	?	30
Edmonton Eskimos	?	?	?	?	33

=== Grey Cup ===
Team	Q1	Q2	Q3	Q4	Total
Montreal Alouettes	1	10	0	14	25
Edmonton Eskimos	0	0	10	6	16

== Roster ==
2002 Edmonton Eskimos final roster
Quarterbacks: 17 Bart Hendricks; 12 Jason Maas; 15 Ricky Ray; Running backs: 20 John Avery; 22 Mike Bradley; 33 Troy Mills; Receivers: 84 Chris Brazzell; 81 Ed Hervey; 86 Scott Robinson; 83 Jason Tucker; 3 Terry Vaughn; 13 Rick Walters	Offensive linemen: 50 Tim Bakker C; 62 Bruce Beaton T; 61 Glenn Carson T; 67 Dan Comiskey G; 59 Leo Groenewegen G; 60 Chris Morris T; 53 Tim Prinsen G; Defensive linemen: 96 Steve Anderson DE; 93 Steve Charbonneau DT; 66 Randy Chevrier DT/LS; 97 Kelvin Kinney DE; 56 Elfrid Payton DE; 94 Doug Petersen DT; 95 Albert Reese DT	Linebackers: 99 Sheldon Benoit; 39 Teddy Neptune; 40 Kelvin Powell; 31 Roger Reinson; 36 Justin Ring; 55 Glen Young; Defensive backs: 26 Donny Brady; 25 Quincy Coleman; 4 Darrel Crutchfield; 10 Malcolm Frank; 23 Shannon Garrett; 8 Chris Hardy; 5 Jackie Kellogg; 27 Singor Mobley; 28 Terry Ray	Special teams: 11 Sean Fleming K/P; Injured list: 90 Rahim Abdullah DE; 19 Fabian Burke DB; 37 Wendell Davis FB; 77 A. J. Gass LB; 80 Rob Harrod SB; 9 Winston October WR; 29 Jerome Peterson DB; 75 Marc Pilon DT; 76 Jed Roberts DE; 88 Durell Robinson WR; -- Keith Smith QB; 24 Ronald Williams RB; Suspended: Jason Clemett LB; Italics indicate American player
