= Fiacconi =

Fiacconi is a surname. Notable people with the surname include:

- Aaron Fiacconi (born 1979), Canadian football player
- Franca Fiacconi (born 1965), Italian marathon runner
