= 2004 Calgary Stampeders season =

Canadian football team season

- Head coach: Matt Dunigan
- Home stadium: McMahon Stadium

Results
- Record: 4–14
- Division place: 5th, West
- Playoffs: did not qualify

Uniform

The 2004 Calgary Stampeders season was the 47th season for the team in the Canadian Football League (CFL) and their 66th overall. The Stampeders finished in fifth place in the West Division with a 4–14 record and failed to make the playoffs. This was the last time Calgary missed the playoffs until 2024.

== Offseason ==
=== CFL draft ===
Rd	Pick	Player	Position	School
2	11	Tyler Lymem	DL	Calgary
2	16	Pascal Masson	DB	Laval
3	19	Jason Taylor	DE	British Columbia
4	28	Anthony Forgione	OL	York
5	37	Christian Simmerling	DB	Saint Mary's
5	42	Marc Mitchell	LB	Queen's
6	46	Andrew Gallant	SB	St. Francis Xavier

== Preseason ==
Week	Date	Opponent	Score	Result	Attendance	Record
B	June 5	vs. Winnipeg Blue Bombers	19–14	Loss	25,655	0–1
C	June 11	at Edmonton Eskimos	22–19	Loss	30,082	0–2

== Regular season ==
=== Season standings ===
West Division
Pos	Team	Pld	W	L	T	PF	PA	PD	Pts
1	BC Lions (C, Q)	18	13	5	0	584	436	+148	26
2	Edmonton Eskimos (Q)	18	9	9	0	532	472	+60	18
3	Saskatchewan Roughriders (Q)	18	9	9	0	476	444	+32	18
4	Winnipeg Blue Bombers	18	7	11	0	448	507	−59	14
5	Calgary Stampeders	18	4	14	0	396	522	−126	8

Source: "2004 Regular Season Standings". Archived from the original on 2011-11-10.
(C) First round bye; (Q) Qualified for playoffs

=== Season schedule ===
Week	Date	Opponent	Score	Result	Attendance	Record
1	June 20	at Saskatchewan Roughriders	33–10	Win	21,119	1–0
2	June 27	vs. Montreal Alouettes	32–14	Loss	30,207	1–1
3	July 4	vs. Hamilton Tiger-Cats	41–34	Loss	26,884	1–2
4	Bye					1–2
5	July 15	at Montreal Alouettes	42–23	Loss	20,202	1–3
6	July 24	vs. Saskatchewan Roughriders	40–21	Loss	35,651	1–4
7	July 29	at Ottawa Renegades	31–30	Loss	22,509	1–5
8	August 7	vs. Winnipeg Blue Bombers	49–27	Win	30,144	2–5
9	August 14	at Saskatchewan Roughriders	46–16	Loss	26,228	2–6
10	August 21	vs. BC Lions	25–18	Loss	28,351	2–7
11	August 27	at Hamilton Tiger-Cats	26–7	Loss	28,850	2–8
12	September 6	vs. Edmonton Eskimos	25–7	Loss	35,651	2–9
13	Sept 10	at Edmonton Eskimos	44–12	Loss	50,366	2–10
14	Sept 17	vs. Ottawa Renegades	26–24	Loss	28,114	2–11
15	Sept 24	vs. BC Lions	22–21	Win	28,524	3–11
16	Sept 29	at Toronto Argonauts	49–24	Loss	22,429	3–12
17	Bye					3–12
18	Oct 16	vs. Toronto Argonauts	29–11	Win	30,082	4–12
19	Oct 22	at BC Lions	19–17	Loss	27,925	4–13
20	Oct 29	at Winnipeg Blue Bombers	37–16	Loss	23,119	4–14

== Roster ==
2004 Calgary Stampeders final roster
Quarterbacks: 17 Khari Jones; 16 Tommy Jones; 15 Mike Souza; Running backs: 21 Randy Bowles; 4 Scott Deibert; 24 Ronney Jenkins; 32 Joffrey Reynolds; Receivers: 88 Andre Arlain; 19 Mike Juhasz; 82 Nik Lewis; 86 Wane McGarity; 89 Denis Montana; 81 Sulecio Sanford; 85 Craig Spear	Offensive linemen: 67 Jamie Crysdale C; 62 Seth Dittman T; 50 Jay McNeil G; 64 Jeff Pilon T; 65 Taylor Robertson G; 69 Greg Schaefer T; Defensive linemen: 77 Tyler Lynem DT; 91 Demetrious Maxie DE; 92 Sheldon Napastuk DT; 96 Garrett Smith DT; 93 Jason Taylor DE; Special teams: 12 Clinton Greathouse K/P	Linebackers: 34 Joe Bonaventura; 48 Brian Clark; 56 Scott Coe; 7 John Grace; 39 Marc Mitchell; 44 Wes Robertson; 38 George White; Defensive backs: 23 Joey Boese; 26 Omar Evans; 25 Milo Lewis; 9 Pascal Masson; 3 Terrence Moore; 28 Christian Simmerling; 11 Nate Terry	Injured list: 35 Bill Chamberlain SB; 37 Marc Calixte LB; 83 Albert Connell WR; 1 Marcus Crandell QB; 29 William Fields DB; 87 Blake Machan SB; 27 Matt McKnight DB; 98 Antwone Young DE; Italics indicate International player

== Awards and records ==
=== 2004 CFL All-Stars ===
- LB – John Grace
