= Jon Landon =

Canadian football player (born 1979)

No. 72/62
- Positions: Guard, Tight end, Centre

Personal information
- Born: July 25, 1979 (age 47); Kingston, Ontario, Canada
- Listed height: 6 ft 3 in (1.91 m)
- Listed weight: 285 lb (129 kg)

Career information
- University: Queen's
- CFL draft: 2002: 4th round, 33rd overall pick

Career history
- 2002: Montreal Alouettes*
- 2003: Hamilton Tiger-Cats*
- 2004–2006: Toronto Argonauts
- 2007: Edmonton Eskimos*
- * Offseason or practice squad member only

Awards and highlights
- 2004 - Argonauts Rookie of the Year; 2004 - 92nd Grey Cup winner
- Stats at CFL.ca (archive)

Jonathon Landon (born July 25, 1979) is a former offensive lineman for the Canadian Football League's Toronto Argonauts. He was traded to the Edmonton Eskimos in February 2007 for future considerations but he chose to retire and begin his teaching career and raise his family in Ottawa, Ontario.

Landon is currently Athletic Director at Ashbury College. and teaches Phys. Ed to grade 10, 11, and 12 students. He coaches the Ashbury's varsity football team to an OFSSA championship in 2018. In 2019, Landon's team defeated Colonel By 42–17 to win the NCSSAA (Ottawa) title, earning another trip the OFSSA's National Capital Bowl, which Ashbury lost to SOSSA champs Westmount Secondary of Hamilton.

Landon has also coaches Ashbury's track and field and basketball teams, after having starred in both sports himself.

He is also the tag teacher for tag 2C3 (Landon tag). and is beloved by his 11 'kids': Josh, Lilia, Axel, Connor, Arnav, Emma, Lily, Hannah, Kaia, Isy and Sarah.
