= Jamie Stoddard =

Canadian football player (born 1977)

Profile
- Position: Wide receiver

Personal information
- Born: December 29, 1977 (age 48); Richmond, British Columbia
- Listed height: 6 ft 1 in (1.85 m)
- Listed weight: 196 lb (89 kg)

Career information
- College: Alberta

Career history
- Winnipeg Blue Bombers (2000–2008)

Awards and highlights
- CIAU First-Team All Canada (1999)
- Stats at CFL.ca (archive)

Jamie Stoddard (born December 29, 1977) is a Canadian former professional football wide receiver. He was signed by the Winnipeg Blue Bombers as an undrafted free agent in 2000. He played CIS Football at Alberta. Jamie now teaches business at Steveston-London Secondary School.

== Statistics ==
Receiving		Regular season					Playoffs
Year	Team	No.	Yards	Avg	Long	TD	Games	No.	Yards	Avg	Long	TD
2000	WPG	6	81	13.5	28	0	2	1	9	9.0	9	0
2001	WPG	34	526	15.5	68	4	2	0	0		0	0
2002	WPG	27	387	14.3	35	1	2	6	44	7.3	10	1
2003	WPG	27	401	14.9	40	1	1	4	75	18.8	26	2
2004	WPG	31	523	16.9	47	2	Team did not qualify
2005	WPG	30	431	14.4	38	2	Team did not qualify
2006	WPG	19	273	14.4	42	1	1	1	12	12.0	12	0
2007	WPG	11	110	10	20	0	3	3	34	11.3	14	0
2008	WPG	6	76	12.7	21	0	1	0	0		0	0
CFL totals		191	2,808	14.7	68	11	12	15	174	11.6	26	3
