= Steve Alexandre =

Canadian football player (born 1978)

Profile
- Position: Defensive end

Personal information
- Born: September 20, 1978 (age 48); Montreal, Quebec, Canada
- Listed height: 6 ft 0 in (1.83 m)
- Listed weight: 238 lb (108 kg)

Career information
- High school: Cégep du Vieux Montréal
- University: Ottawa

Career history
- 2002–2003: Hamilton Tiger-Cats

Steve Alexandre (born September 20, 1978) is a Canadian former professional football defensive end who played for the Hamilton Tiger-Cats of the Canadian Football League from 2002 to 2003. He recorded 10 tackles and one sack over 22 games from 2002 to 2003. He also played college football for the Ottawa Gee-Gees.

== Early career ==
Alexandre played football at Cégep du Vieux Montréal. With Alexandre, the Vieux Montréal Spartiates won the AAA football final at the Bol d'Or in 1997. From 1998 to 2001, Alexandre played for the Ottawa Gee-Gees. He was ejected from a 1998 CIAU semifinal game against the Laval Rouge et Or after objecting to an official's call. The Gee-Gees went on to lose the game 42–48, and Alexandre was suspended for the first game of the 1999 season due to his ejection. The Gee-Gees won the Vanier Cup in 2000 and had a 6–2 season in 2001.

== Professional career ==
Alexandre was available in the 2002 CFL draft but went undrafted. The Hamilton Tiger-Cats signed Alexandre as a free agent for their training camp in May 2002. The Tiger-Cats were interested in Alexandre primarily due to his ability as a long snapper. In training camp, he also showed promise on special teams. Alexandre made his CFL debut in the season opener against the BC Lions on June 29, 2002. He was primarily used as both a long snapper and on the special teams throughout the regular season, seeing little time on the defense. When Lamont Bryant was injured in a September game against the Toronto Argonauts, Alexandre played on the defense and recorded his first sack. In addition to his single sack, Alexandre finished the season with 10 tackles across 16 games. After playing in the first six games of the 2003 season, Alexandre was released from the Tiger-Cats due to botched long snaps.

== Later life ==
After leaving the Tiger-Cats, Alexandre was hired to teach French at Laval Liberty High School, where he also coached the Laval Liberty AAA football team.

Steve was inducted into the Gee-Gees Gee-Gees Football Hall of Fame in 2018.
