= 2002 CFL draft =

Canadian football draft

General information
- Sport: Canadian football
- Date: April 25
- Time: 11:00 AM EST

Overview
- 54 total selections in 6 rounds
- League: CFL
- First selection: Alexandre Gauthier, OL; Ottawa Renegades
- Most selections (9): Toronto Argonauts
- Fewest selections (3): Edmonton Eskimos
- CIS selections: 26
- NCAA selections: 24

The 2002 CFL draft took place on Thursday, April 25, 2002. From a list of 442 eligible CIS football players from Canadian universities and Canadian players in the NCAA and NAIA, 54 players were chosen, including 26 players from Canadian Interuniversity Sport institutions.

This year's draft saw an increase in picks from 48 in 2001 to 54 with the addition of the Ottawa Renegades to the league for the 2002 season. Ottawa was given the first selection in each round, including another bonus selection with the first overall pick.

== Forfeitures ==
- Saskatchewan forfeited their first-round pick after selecting Andrew Moore in the 2001 Supplemental Draft.

== Round one ==
= CFL Division All-Star	= CFL All-Star	= Hall of Famer

Pick #	CFL team	Player	Position	School
1	Ottawa Renegades (Bonus)	Alexandre Gauthier	OL	Laval
2	Ottawa Renegades	Mike Vilimek	RB	Simon Fraser
–	Saskatchewan Roughriders	Selection forfeited		
3	Toronto Argonauts	Cory Annett	OL	Eastern Michigan
4	BC Lions	Jason Clermont	SB	Regina
5	Montreal Alouettes	Patrick Dorvelus	CB	Hofstra
6	BC Lions (via Edmonton)	Paul Cheng	DL	Simon Fraser
7	Hamilton Tiger-Cats	John Macdonald	DL	McGill
8	Calgary Stampeders (via Winnipeg)	Jon Oosterhuis	DE	New Hampshire
9	Calgary Stampeders	Brian Nugent	WR	York

== Round two ==
Pick #	CFL team	Player	Position	School
10	Ottawa Renegades	D.J. Owchar	DL	Bowling Green
11	Ottawa Renegades (via Saskatchewan)	Pat Fleming	P	Bowling Green
12	Montreal Alouettes (via Toronto)	Sherko Haji-Rasouli	OL	Miami
13	Ottawa Renegades (via BC)	Brock Ralph	WR	Wyoming
14	Calgary Stampeders (via Montreal via Ottawa via Toronto)	Deitan Dubuc	TE	Michigan
15	Saskatchewan Roughriders (via Edmonton)	Francois Boulianne	OL	Laval
16	Hamilton Tiger-Cats	Jake Roberts	OL	Simon Fraser
17	BC Lions (via Winnipeg)	Brett Romberg	OL	Miami
18	Calgary Stampeders	Scott Gordon	DB	Ottawa

== Round three ==
Pick #	CFL team	Player	Position	School
19	Ottawa Renegades	Kevin Lawrence	RB	Northwestern
20	Saskatchewan Roughriders	Patrick Thibeault	SB	Saint Mary's
21	Toronto Argonauts	Robin Tremblay	DE	Houston
22	BC Lions	Chris Gayton	LB	Kentucky
23	Montreal Alouettes	Josh Jansen	LB	Occidental College
24	Edmonton Eskimos	Dahrran Diedrick	RB	Nebraska
25	Hamilton Tiger-Cats	Doug Borden	DT	Saint Mary's
26	Winnipeg Blue Bombers	Michael Shaver	FB	Ottawa
27	Calgary Stampeders	Reid Seitz	WR	Northern Iowa

== Round four ==
Pick #	CFL team	Player	Position	School
28	Toronto Argonauts (via Ottawa)	Rob Stewart	DT	Manitoba
29	Saskatchewan Roughriders	Darnell Edwards	CB	Manitoba
30	Toronto Argonauts	Alexis Sanschagrin	DB	Western Ontario
31	BC Lions	John Williams	RB	Edinboro
32	Montreal Alouettes	Aaron Fiacconi	OT	Mansfield
33	Montreal Alouettes (via Edmonton)	Jon Landon	OL	Queen's
34	Hamilton Tiger-Cats	Jamie Elliot	WR	Calgary
35	Winnipeg Blue Bombers	Mike Faisthuber	SB	Manitoba
36	Calgary Stampeders	Jeff Almon	RB	Calgary

== Round five ==
Pick #	CFL team	Player	Position	School
37	Ottawa Renegades	Youdlain Marcellus	DB	Buffalo
38	Saskatchewan Roughriders	Gonzalo Segovia	DT	Eastern Illinois
39	Toronto Argonauts	Marvin Brereton	RB	Buffalo
40	Winnipeg Blue Bombers (via BC)	Lloyd Orris	RB	Simon Fraser
41	BC Lions (via Montreal)	Atnas Maeko	WR	Saint Mary's
42	Edmonton Eskimos	Olanzo Jarrett	DE	Toledo
43	Hamilton Tiger-Cats	Scott Coe	LB	Manitoba
44	Winnipeg Blue Bombers	Joey Mikawoz	LB	Manitoba
45	Toronto Argonauts	Chuck Walsh	LB	Waterloo

== Round six ==
Pick #	CFL team	Player	Position	School
46	Ottawa Renegades	Tyler Paopao	QB	Occidental College
47	Saskatchewan Roughriders	Curtis Nash	DB	Saint Mary's
48	Toronto Argonauts	Sean Spender	LB	Guelph
49	Toronto Argonauts (via BC)	Jarel Cockburn	WR	Columbia
50	Montreal Alouettes	Mitch Sutherland	DE	Alberta
51	Edmonton Eskimos	Andrew Dubiellak	WR	UNLV
52	Hamilton Tiger-Cats	Kenneth Vermette	RB	Manitoba
53	BC Lions (via Winnipeg)	Joe Orel	WR	Manitoba
54	Toronto Argonauts (via Calgary)	Darryl Ray	WR	Ottawa
