= Mike Vilimek =

Canadian football player (born 1979)

Profile
- Position: Fullback

Personal information
- Born: January 5, 1979 (age 47); North Vancouver, British Columbia
- Listed height: 6 ft 4 in (1.93 m)
- Listed weight: 240 lb (109 kg)

Career information
- University: Simon Fraser University
- CFL draft: 2002: 1st round, 2nd overall pick

Career history
- 2002–2004: Ottawa Renegades
- 2005–2008: Montreal Alouettes
- Stats at CFL.ca

Mike Vilimek (born January 5, 1979) is a Canadian former professional football player. Vilimek played the fullback position. During the offseasons, Vilimek held marketing and business development positions at Ballard Power Systems, Protexis Inc., and Serebra Learning Corp. He has also held leadership positions at ACL (software), Talent Technology, and Oracle Corporation.

== Early life ==
Vilimek was born in Vancouver and played tailback and linebacker in high school at Windsor Secondary School in North Vancouver. Following high school, Vilimek attended Simon Fraser University located in Burnaby. As a tailback, Vilimek set school records for most rushing yards in a single game (315) versus Humboldt State on November 3, 2001, and most rushing yards in a single season (1,187) in 2001. Vilimek was also named SFU’s athlete of the year in 2001.

He graduated with a bachelor's degree in business with a focus on marketing and international business.

== Professional career ==
Vilimek was invited to a mini-camp with the San Francisco 49ers but did not sign with the team. Vilimek was drafted in the first round (2nd overall) of the CFL draft by the Ottawa Renegades in 2002. Vilimek was transferred to fullback and played on special teams for 3 seasons with Ottawa from 2002 to 2004. As a free agent, Vilimek signed with the Montreal Alouettes in 2005. In his first season in Montreal, Vilimek scored 5 touchdowns and lead the team in special teams tackles.

Vilimek tore his ACL in a game versus the Toronto Argonauts on July 26, 2007, and missed the remainder of the season.

On December 11, 2008, Vilimek was released along with Jeff Keeping.
