= 2002 Calgary Stampeders season =

Canadian football team season

- Owner: Michael Feterik
- General manager: Wally Buono
- Head coach: Wally Buono
- Home stadium: McMahon Stadium

Results
- Record: 6–12
- Division place: 5th, West
- Playoffs: did not qualify

Uniform

The 2002 Calgary Stampeders season was the 45th season for the team in the Canadian Football League (CFL) and their 64th overall. The Stampeders finished in fifth place in the West Division with a 6–12 record and failed to make the playoffs for the first time since the 1988 season. This season marked the first time Wally Buono would miss the playoffs in his 13 years as head coach of the team.

== Offseason ==
=== CFL draft ===
Rd	Pick	Player	Position	School
1	8	Jon Oosterhuis	DE	New Hampshire
1	9	Brian Nugent	WR	York
2	14	Deitan Dubuc	TE	Michigan
2	18	Scott Gordon	DB	Ottawa
3	27	Reid Seitz	WR	Northern Iowa
4	36	Jeff Almon	RB	Calgary

== Preseason ==
Week	Date	Opponent	Score	Result	Attendance	Record
B	June 12	vs. BC Lions	24–8	Win	27,764	1–0
C	June 20	at Edmonton Eskimos	52–41	Loss	33,107	1–1

== Regular season ==
=== Season standings ===
West Division
Pos	Team	Pld	W	L	T	OTL	PF	PA	PD	Pts
1	Edmonton Eskimos (C, Q)	18	13	5	0	0	516	450	+66	26
2	Winnipeg Blue Bombers (Q)	18	12	6	0	0	566	421	+145	24
3	BC Lions (Q)	18	10	8	0	0	480	399	+81	20
4	Saskatchewan Roughriders (Q)	18	8	8	0	2	435	393	+42	18
5	Calgary Stampeders	18	6	10	0	2	438	509	−71	14

Source: "CFL.ca". Archived from the original on 2009-06-29.
(C) First round bye; (Q) Qualified for playoffs

=== Season schedule ===
Week	Date	Opponent	Score	Result	Attendance	Record
1	June 28	vs. Edmonton Eskimos	27–21	Loss	33,584	0–1
2	July 5	at Saskatchewan Roughriders	32–21	Loss	21,968	0–2
3	July 12	at Hamilton Tiger-Cats	34–31 (OT)	Loss	17,140	0–3
4	July 18	vs. Montreal Alouettes	37–20	Loss	32,018	0–4
5	July 25	vs. Saskatchewan Roughriders	26–21	Win	35,967	1–4
6	August 1	at BC Lions	23–15	Win	15,117	2–4
7	August 8	vs. Toronto Argonauts	31–11	Win	31,920	3–4
8	August 15	at Montreal Alouettes	38–23	Loss	20,002	3–5
9	August 23	at Winnipeg Blue Bombers	51–48 (OT)	Loss	27,876	3–6
10	Sept 2	vs. Edmonton Eskimos	28–20	Loss	35,967	3–7
11	Sept 6	at Edmonton Eskimos	45–11	Loss	61,481	3–8
12	Sept 14	vs. Ottawa Renegades	26–12	Loss	31,891	3–9
13	Sept 22	at Ottawa Renegades	26–22 (OT)	Win	23,136	4–9
14	Bye					4–9
15	Oct 4	vs. Hamilton Tiger-Cats	43–5	Win	30,575	5–9
16	Oct 11	at BC Lions	37–14	Loss	20,950	5–10
17	Oct 18	vs. Winnipeg Blue Bombers	35–20	Loss	30,776	5–11
18	Oct 27	vs. BC Lions	16–15	Win	31,698	6–11
19	Nov 3	at Toronto Argonauts	33–32	Loss	19,232	6–12

== Roster ==
2002 Calgary Stampeders final roster
Quarterbacks: 1 Marcus Crandell; 16 Darnell Kennedy; 17 Ben Sankey; Running backs: 32 Kelvin Anderson; 4 Scott Deibert; 35 Scott Regimbald; 6 Antonio Warren; Receivers: 82 Don Blair; 81 Kamil Loud; 86 Wane McGarity; 83 Travis Moore; 85 Brian Nugent; 8 Kamau Peterson; 2 Ibrahim Tounkara	Offensive linemen: 69 Andrew Carter T; 68 Freddie Childress T; 67 Jamie Crysdale C; 54 David Heasman G; 50 Jay McNeil G; 64 Jeff Pilon T; Defensive linemen: 74 Melvin Bradley DT; 77 Paul Cheng DT; 99 James Cotton DE; 91 Tyrone Rodgers DT; 98 Antwone Young DE; Special teams: 13 Mark McLoughlin K; 97 Duncan O'Mahony P	Linebackers: 45 Michel Dupuis; 35 Otis Floyd; 56 Chris Hoople; 51 Alondra Johnson; Defensive backs: 33 Da'Shann Austin; 11 Jason Bray; 36 Lawrence Deck; 29 William Fields; 12 Greg Frers; 9 Aldi Henry; 26 Anthony Malbrough; 3 Kelly Malveaux	Injured list: 92 Steve Anderson DE; 39 Willie Fells LB; 7 Kevin Feterik QB; 63 O'Lester Pope T; 62 Bobby Singh G; 94 Jeff Traversy DT; 37 Payton Williams DB; Suspended: 99 James Burgess LB; 76 Joe Fleming DT; Italics indicate International player

== Awards and records ==
=== 2002 CFL All-Stars ===
- OG – Jay McNeil
