= Dave Ritchie (gridiron football) =

Canadian football player (1938–2024)

Profile
- Positions: Head coach, defensive coordinator

Personal information
- Born: September 3, 1938; New Bedford, Massachusetts, U.S.
- Died: March 9, 2024 (aged 85); Rumford, Rhode Island, U.S.

Career information
- High school: Withrow (Cincinnati, Ohio)
- College: Cincinnati

Career history
- 1962–1965: Greenbrier Military School (Assistant coach)
- 1966–1968: Greenbrier Military School (Head coach)
- 1969–1972: Cincinnati Bearcats (Linebackers coach)
- 1973–1977: Brown Bears (Linebackers coach)
- 1978–1982: Fairmont State Fighting Falcons (Head coach)
- 1983–1986: Montreal Concordes, Alouettes (Defensive backs coach)
- 1987–1988: Cincinnati Bearcats (Defensive coordinator)
- 1989: Milano Seamen (Asst. head coach/defensive coordinator)
- 1989: Marshall Thundering Herd (Defensive coordinator)
- 1990: Winnipeg Blue Bombers (Defensive line coach, special teams coach)
- 1991: Winnipeg Blue Bombers (Defensive backs coach)
- 1992: Ottawa Rough Riders (Defensive coordinator, defensive backs coach)
- 1993–1995: BC Lions (Head coach)
- 1996: Montreal Alouettes (Defensive coordinator)
- 1997–1998: Montreal Alouettes (Head coach)
- 1999–2004: Winnipeg Blue Bombers (Head coach)
- 2005–2007: BC Lions (Defensive coordinator)
- 2011–2012: Zurich Renegades (Head coach)

Awards and highlights
- CFL Coach of the Year (2001); 3× Grey Cup champion (1990, 1994, 2006); CFL's seventh all-time winningest coach (108 wins)

Career statistics
- CFL coaching record: 108–76–3
- Canadian Football Hall of Fame (Class of 2022)

David F. Ritchie (September 3, 1938 – March 9, 2024) was an American gridiron football coach in college football, the Canadian Football League (CFL), the Italian Football League (IFL), and the Swiss National League. He is best known for his time as the Winnipeg Blue Bombers head coach from 1999 to 2004. He was a three-time Grey Cup champion, having won in 1990, 1994, and 2006 and was named the CFL's Coach of the Year in 2001. He won 108 regular season games as a head coach in the CFL which is the seventh highest win total by a head coach in the league's history.

== Early life and college career ==
Ritchie was born on September 3, 1938, in New Bedford, Massachusetts. His father, also named Dave Ritchie, was one of the best running backs in the history of New Bedford High School and the younger Ritchie hoped to follow in his footsteps. He was NBHS's starting quarterback for two seasons, but his family moved to Cincinnati during his senior year. Ritchie was an All-Ohio fullback at Withrow High School and played college football as a fullback, linebacker, and punter for the Cincinnati Bearcats from 1958 to 1960.

== Coaching career ==
=== College coaching ===
Ritchie began his coaching career in 1962 as an assistant coach with Greenbrier Military School. He became Greenbrier's head coach in 1966 and remained there until 1969, when he became linebackers coach at his alma mater, Cincinnati. He then joined the Brown Bears as an assistant coach and head recruiter. Thereafter, Ritchie was the head coach for the Fairmont State Fighting Falcons, from 1978 to 1982, where he compiled a 35–13–3 record.

=== Montreal Concordes, Alouettes ===
Ritchie first entered the Canadian Football League as the defensive backfield coach for the Montreal Concordes in 1983, alongside linebackers coach, Wally Buono.

=== Interlude ===
Ritchie re-joined the Cincinnati Bearcats as defensive coordinator in 1987. He then moved to Europe and was the defensive coordinator for the Milano Seamen in the Italian Football League in 1989 where the team finished with a 13–1 record before losing in the Italian championship game. He returned to the United States that spring as defensive coordinator at Marshall.

=== Winnipeg Blue Bombers ===
Ritchie returned to the CFL as the defensive line coach and special teams assistant coach with the Winnipeg Blue Bombers in 1990, a year in which the Blue Bombers won the 78th Grey Cup. He was an assistant coach in 1991, the same year when the Blue Bombers lost the East Final to the Toronto Argonauts.

=== Ottawa Rough Riders ===
Ritchie was hired by the Ottawa Rough Riders to become the team's defensive coordinator for the 1992 season. The team led the CFL in 18 of 25 defensive categories that year and finished with a non-losing record for the first time since 1983.

=== BC Lions ===
In 1993, Ritchie was named the head coach of the BC Lions as he took over a team that had a 3–15 record in the year prior. The Lions immediately improved and finished with a 10–8 record that year, losing the West Semi-Final to the Calgary Stampeders. In the 1994 season, after beginning the year 8–1–1, the Lions finished in third place with an 11–6–1 record. The Lions defeated the Edmonton Eskimos and then the Calgary Stampeders in the playoffs to qualify for the 82nd Grey Cup against the Baltimore Football Club. In the first ever Grey Cup game to feature an American team, Ritchie led his team to a 26–23 victory as the Lions won a Grey Cup in Vancouver for the first time in club history and were also the first West Division team to win the Grey Cup at home. In 1995, the Lions ended their season with a 10–8 record, but were defeated by the Edmonton Eskimos in the North Semi-Final.

=== Montreal Alouettes (second stint) ===
Ritchie joined the Montreal Alouettes in 1996 after the Alouetts moved from Baltimore, and as he was also on the coaching staff in 1987 when the Alouettes were last in the league. He was promoted to head coach in 1997 and led the team to a 13–5 record, but lost the East Final to the defending Grey Cup champion Toronto Argonauts. In 1998, the Alouettes finished with a 12–5–1 record, but lost the East Final on a last second field goal to the Hamilton Tiger-Cats.

=== Winnipeg Blue Bombers (second stint) ===
Ritchie was hired away from the Alouettes in 1999 because of a more lucrative offer from the Winnipeg Blue Bombers to become their head coach. The team had a 3–15 record the year before and Ritchie led the Blue Bombers to a 6–12 record in 1999. After an East Final appearance in 2000 with a 7–10–1 record, the Blue Bombers demonstrated dominance in 2001 with a 14–4 record, tied for the most wins in franchise history. However, the heavily favoured Blue Bombers were upset by the 8–10 Calgary Stampeders in the 89th Grey Cup game by a score of 27–19. Following the game, Ritchie was critical of placekicker, Troy Westwood, who missed three of four field goal attempts in the game.

Ritchie continued to coach the Blue Bombers with a 12–6 record in 2002 and an 11–7 record in 2003, but the team was defeated in the playoffs in both years with no Grey Cup appearances. On August 8, 2004, with the Blue Bombers losing three in a row with a 2–5 record to begin their season, Ritchie was relieved of head coaching duties. He finished his Blue Bomber tenure with the third-most wins in club history.

=== BC Lions (second stint) ===
Ritchie was hired by longtime associate, Wally Buono, on February 25, 2005, to become the defensive coordinator on the BC Lions in 2005. In 2006, he won his third Grey Cup championship as the Lions won the 94th Grey Cup over the Montreal Alouettes. After three seasons with the Lions, Ritchie retired following the end of the 2007 CFL season. He was considered for the 2008 Saskatchewan Roughriders head coach position, which he would have accepted, but the position went to Ken Miller.

=== Zurich Renegades ===
Ritchie returned to the field in 2011 as head coach of the Zurich Renegades in the top-level league in Switzerland, helping the team reach the semi-finals in 2012. Overall, he spent two seasons with the team.

== Hall of Fame ==
Ritchie was named to the Fairmont State Hall of Fame in 2010, following five years as a head coach there with two conference titles and one Coal Bowl victory in 1979. He is a member of the Blue Bomber Hall of Fame as the fourth-winningest head coach in team history with a record of 52–44–1 and winning a Grey Cup as an assistant coach in 1990.

On June 21, 2022, it was announced that Ritchie would be enshrined in the Canadian Football Hall of Fame in the Class of 2022 as a builder.

== Personal life and death ==
Ritchie with his wife, Sharon, lived in Rhode Island. They had three children, Phyllis, Susan, and Dave, and eight grandchildren. Ritchie died at his home in Rumford on March 9, 2024, at the age of 85.

== Head coaching record ==
=== College ===
Year	Team	Overall	Conference	Standing	Bowl/playoffs	NAIA^{#}
Fairmont State Fighting Falcons (West Virginia Intercollegiate Athletic Conference) (1978–1982)
1978	Fairmont State	5–4–1	5–4	3rd (Northern)		
1979	Fairmont State	9–1–1	7–1–1	T–1st (Northern)		9
1980	Fairmont State	6–3–1	6–2–1	T–1st (Northern)		
1981	Fairmont State	9–2	8–1	T–1st	L NAIA Division I Quarterfinal	5
1982	Fairmont State	6–3	6–2	T–2nd		
Fairmont State:		35–13–3	31–10–2			
Total:		35–13–3				
National championship Conference title Conference division title or championship game berth
^{#}Rankings from final NAIA Division I poll.

=== CFL ===
Team	Year	Regular season					Post-season			Ref.
Team	Year	Won	Lost	Ties	Win %	Finish	Won	Lost	Result	Ref.
BC	1993	10	8	0	.556	4th in West Division	0	1	Lost in Division Semi-Finals	
BC	1994	11	6	1	.639	3rd in West Division	3	0	Won Grey Cup	
BC	1995	10	8	0	.556	3rd in North Division	0	1	Lost in Division Semi-Finals	
BC total		31	22	1	.583	0 West Division; Championships	3	2	1 Grey Cup	
MTL	1997	13	5	0	.722	2nd in East Division	1	1	Lost in Division Finals	
MTL	1998	12	5	1	.694	2nd in East Division	1	1	Lost in Division Finals	
MTL total		25	10	1	.708	0 East Division; Championships	2	2	0 Grey Cups	
WPG	1999	6	12	0	.333	4th in East Division	–	–	Missed playoffs	
WPG	2000	7	10	1	.412	3rd in East Division	1	1	Lost in Division Finals	
WPG	2001	14	4	0	.778	1st in East Division	1	1	Lost in Grey Cup	
WPG	2002	12	6	0	.667	2nd in West Division	1	1	Lost in Division Finals	
WPG	2003	11	7	0	.611	2nd in West Division	0	1	Lost in Division Semi-Finals	
WPG	2004	2	5	0	.286	4th in West Division	–	–	Fired	
WPG total		52	44	1	.532	1 East Division; Championship	3	4	0 Grey Cups	
Total		108	76	3	.587	1 East Division; Championship	8	8	1 Grey Cup	

Awards
Preceded by Ron Lancaster	Grey Cup–winning head coach 82nd Grey Cup, 1994	Succeeded by Don Matthews
