= Darnell Edwards =

Canadian football player (born 1979)

No. 11
- Positions: Free safety, Cornerback

Personal information
- Born: November 12, 1979 (age 46); Montreal, Quebec, Canada
- Listed height: 6 ft 3 in (1.91 m)

Career information
- University: University of Manitoba
- CFL draft: 2002: 4th round, 29th overall pick

Career history
- 2002-2006: Saskatchewan Roughriders

Awards and highlights
- All-Canadian (2001)

Career CFL statistics
- Tackles: 94
- Sacks: 2
- Interceptions: 2
- Fumble Recoveries: 2

Darnell Edwards (born November 12, 1979) is a Canadian former professional football free safety who played five seasons with the Saskatchewan Roughriders of the Canadian Football League from 2002-2006.

== College career ==
Darnell Edwards played college football at the University of Manitoba for the Bisons from 1999-2001. Edwards started his football career as a receiver before converting to a defensive back. Edwards was able to use his receiving skills in his new position, racking up a Manitoba record 11 interceptions in three seasons with the Bisons. In his final season before turning pro, Edwards and his teammates finished with a 7-1 record and made it to the 56th Vanier Cup, losing to the Saint Mary's Huskies 42-16.

== Saskatchewan Roughriders ==
Following his stent on the Manitoba Bisons, Edwards was drafted 29th overall in the fourth round of the 2002 CFL draft by the Saskatchewan Roughriders. Edwards played five seasons with the Roughriders, amassing a total of 94 tackles, 2 interceptions, and 2 fumble recoveries.

Before his fifth season with the Roughriders, Edwards suffered a knee injury in training camp that placed him on the team's suspended list for the majority of the 2006 season. Edwards was able to return for the last two games of the season, only playing on special teams. At the end of the season, Edwards was released as a Free agent. Roughriders Head Coach Danny Barrett cited multiple reasons for releasing Edwards such as too many safeties in the depth chart and Edwards' stagnated performance after his injury.

Darnell Edwards was unable to sign with a team after the 2006 season and retired from football soon after.

== Career statistics ==
Year	Team	TKL	SST	Sacks	INT	YDS	LG	TD	Fumb	YDS	LG	TD
2002	SSK	4	6	0	0	0	0	0	0	0	0	0
2003	SSK	22	2	2	1	29	29	0	1	0	0	0
2004	SSK	41	6	0	1	0	0	0	1	0	0	0
2005	SSK	7	6	0	0	0	0	0	0	0	0	0
2006	SSK	0	0	0	0	0	0	0	0	0	0	0
Totals		74	20	2	2	29	29	0	2	0	0	0
