= Pat Fleming (Canadian football) =

Canadian football player (born 1978)

Profile
- Positions: Punter, Kicker

Personal information
- Born: June 30, 1978 (age 48); Ottawa, Ontario, Canada
- Listed height: 6 ft 2 in (1.88 m)
- Listed weight: 190 lb (86 kg)

Career information
- College: Bowling Green
- CFL draft: 2002: 2nd round, 11th overall pick

Career history
- 2003–2005: Ottawa Renegades
- 2006: Hamilton Tiger-Cats
- 2007: Winnipeg Blue Bombers

Pat Fleming (born June 30, 1978) is a former Canadian Football League punter and placekicker who played for five seasons for the Ottawa Renegades, Hamilton Tiger-Cats and Winnipeg Blue Bombers. He played college football for the Bowling Green Falcons.
