= John Macdonald (Canadian football) =

Canadian football player (born 1978)

No. 91
- Position: DL

Personal information
- Born: August 30, 1978 (age 48); Hamilton, Ontario
- Listed height: 6 ft 2 in (1.88 m)
- Listed weight: 275 lb (125 kg)

Career information
- University: McGill
- CFL draft: 2002: 1st round, 7th overall pick

Career history
- 2002–2004: Hamilton Tiger-Cats
- Stats at CFL.ca (archive)

John Macdonald (born August 30, 1978) is a Canadian former professional football defensive linemen. He was drafted by the Hamilton Tiger-Cats in the first round of the 2002 CFL draft. He played college football at McGill University. John was raised in Simcoe, Ontario and is a Mohawk from Six Nations of the Grand River, Ontario.

John is currently a teacher for the Grand Erie District School Board. He is married with two children and lives in Brantford, Ontario.
