= Jeff Almon =

Canadian football player (born 1978)

Profile
- Position: Fullback

Personal information
- Born: May 20, 1978 (age 48)
- Listed height: 6 ft 3 in (1.91 m)
- Listed weight: 225 lb (102 kg)

Career information
- High school: St. Thomas Aquinas
- University: Calgary
- CFL draft: 2002: 4th round, 36th overall pick

Career history
- 2002: Calgary Stampeders*
- 2003: BC Lions
- * Offseason or practice squad member only

Jeff Almon (born May 20, 1978) is a Canadian former professional football fullback who played for the BC Lions of the Canadian Football League (CFL). He played college football for the Calgary Dinos from 1997 to 2002. While at the University of Calgary, Almon studied kinesiology. The Calgary Stampeders selected Almon in the fourth round of the 2002 CFL draft, but he didn't make the team. After playing his final year of college eligibility, Almon was signed by the Lions. During the 2003 season, Almon played one game for the Lions.

== Early career ==
Almon played high school football at St. Thomas Aquinas Catholic Secondary School. He initially played as a defensive end, but converted to the tight end position where he played for most of his high school career. As a senior in 1996, he was nominated to be the Burlington Spectator Athlete of the Week for his contributions to the football team. The St. Thomas Aquinas team went on to win the county championship that year. Almon also played ice hockey and competed in shot put with the track and field team in high school.

From 1997 to 2002, Almon played college football for the Calgary Dinos of the University of Calgary. For his first two seasons and the first half of 1999, Almon played as a slotback for the Dinos. Halfway through the 1999 season, the Dinos coaching staff converted Almon to the position of fullback, which he went on to play for the rest of his career. Running back coach Chris Lewis cited Almon's blocking, speed, and ability as a receiver as ideal for the non-traditional backfield the Dinos wished to run, and Lewis stated that they intended to use Almon in a more versatile role than a "traditional fullback". Almon started in this role for the rest of his time with the Dinos. As a senior in 2001 and after returning in 2002, Almon was selected as a co-captain of the Dinos.

== Professional career ==
In April 2002, Almon was invited to the evaluation camp for top prospects for the CFL draft. His skill at blocking, ability on special teams, and experience as a receiver were all cited by the press as factors that may attract interest from teams in the draft. On the return flight from the evaluation camp, Almon was seated near Calgary Stampeders assistant coach Mike Benevides, who later stated he made a favourable impression. The Calgary Stampeders selected Almon in the fourth round of the 2002 CFL draft with the 36th overall pick. Almon attended training camp with the Stampeders and impressed head coach Wally Buono, who stated, "He's represented his school very well and been a credit to himself." Almon didn't make the final roster, however, and the Stampeders sent him back to the Calgary Dinos to play out his final year of college eligibility.

Almon was signed by the BC Lions and attended their training camp in 2003. He was cut before the start of the regular season. He was later activated due to injuries and played in a single regular season game for the Lions.

== Personal life ==
Almon studied kinesiology at the University of Calgary and intended to start a career as a chiropractor. After retiring from the CFL, Almon attended Canadian Memorial Chiropractic College, where he received his Doctor of Chiropractic degree in 2008. He later founded the MVMTLAB Sports Performance Clinic.

Almon's brother, Dave Almon, played college football for the Calgary Dinos as a defensive back.
