= John Williams Jr. (Canadian football) =

Canadian football player

John Williams II
No. 11,23
- Position: Running back

Personal information
- Born: September 23, 1977 (age 49); Millgrove, Ontario, Canada
- Listed height: 6 ft 1 in (1.85 m)
- Listed weight: 220 lb (100 kg)

Career information
- High school: Waterdown District
- College: Edinboro
- CFL draft: 2002: 4th round, 31st overall pick

Career history
- 2002: BC Lions
- 2003: Edmonton Eskimos*
- 2004–2007: Toronto Argonauts
- 2008–2009: Hamilton Tiger-Cats
- * Offseason or practice squad member only

Awards and highlights
- 2× Grey Cup champion (2003, 2004); Special Teams Player of the Week
- Stats at CFL.ca

John M. Williams Jr. (born September 23, 1977) is a retired Canadian Football League (CFL) running back. He played for the BC Lions, the Toronto Argonauts and the Hamilton Tiger-Cats.

== Early life ==
Williams is the son of the former CFL player John "Twiggy" Williams (born: Fort Worth, Texas) who played for four teams from 1967 to 1975. Williams Junior played for his father from the age of 9 until 18 years of age. Williams Senior was a part-time scout for the Detroit Lions which allowed Junior to spend many summers around the future Hall of Fame running back Barry Sanders and other NFL greats. Williams was awarded an athletic scholarship to attend The University of Rhode Island, later transferring to Edinboro University of Pennsylvania.

== Professional career ==
Williams was considered a "hybrid" player known for his physical play and being able to work from several positions in his eight-year career including running back, fullback, tight-end and slot-back.

Williams was selected 31st overall in the 2002 CFL draft by the BC Lions and he played 15 games of the 2002 CFL season, carrying the ball once for a three-yard gain, recorded four defensive tackles and eight special teams tackles. The Lions released him in the 2003 pre-season and the Edmonton Eskimos signed him to the practice roster on September 3, where he remained for the season.

From 2004 through the 2007 CFL season, Williams played for the Toronto Argonauts where he was consistently one of the team leaders in special team tackles. In the 2004 CFL season, he played in all 18 regular season games, carried the ball three times for 37 yards, and scored one touchdown. He also made one defensive tackle and three special teams tackles and played in all three Argos playoff games including the 92nd Grey Cup victory over the BC Lions.

On February 7, 2008, Williams was traded to the Hamilton Tiger-Cats in exchange for future considerations. He played in 17 games and carried the ball for 29 yards on five runs and received two passes for 16 yards. During the 2009 season, Williams became a more integral part of the offence, splitting time at several positions as well as returning kicks. Williams elected to retire after the season.
