= Gilles Colon =

Canadian football player (born 1981)

Profile
- Position: Wide receiver

Personal information
- Born: July 25, 1981 (age 45); Port-au-Prince, Haiti
- Listed height: 6 ft 0 in (1.83 m)
- Listed weight: 200 lb (91 kg)

Career information
- University: Bishop's
- CFL draft: 2004: undrafted

Career history
- 2004–2005: Winnipeg Blue Bombers
- 2006: BC Lions

Awards and highlights
- Grey Cup champion (2006)

Gilles Colon (born July 25, 1981) is a former Canadian Football League (CFL) wide receiver who played for three seasons for the Winnipeg Blue Bombers and BC Lions. He won the 94th Grey Cup in 2006 as a member of the Lions. He played CIS football for the Bishop's Gaiters. Gilles Colon played from 2004 to 2006 during his career with the Winnipeg Blue Bombers and BC Lions. Colon caught 28 passes for 365 yards and two receiving touchdowns in his career.
