= Donald Heaven =

American football player (born 1978)

No. 52
- Position: Offensive lineman

Personal information
- Born: April 7, 1978 (age 48); Brooklyn, New York, U.S.
- Listed height: 6 ft 3 in (1.91 m)
- Listed weight: 313 lb (142 kg)

Career information
- High school: Miami Carol (Miami Gardens, Florida)
- College: Florida State (1996–2000)
- NFL draft: 2001: undrafted

Career history
- Saskatchewan Roughriders (2001–2004)

Awards and highlights
- BCS national champion (1999); Freshman All-America (1997)

Career CFL statistics
- Games played: 32
- Fumble recoveries: 1

Donald Heaven (born April 7, 1978) is an American former professional football offensive lineman who played in the Canadian Football League (CFL) with the Saskatchewan Roughriders. He played college football for the Florida State Seminoles.

== Early life ==
Heaven was born on December 22, 1979, in Brooklyn, New York. He attended Miami Carol City Senior High School in Miami Gardens, Florida.

== College career ==
Heaven played college football for the Florida State Seminoles from 1996 to 2000. He redshirted his first year and was a four-year letterman from 1997 to 2000. Heaven played at guard and tackle and was named to the 1997 Freshman All-America team by Football News.

== Professional career ==
On June 11, 2001, Heaven signed with the Saskatchewan Roughriders of the Canadian Football League (CFL). On June 22, he was released by the team. On May 21, 2002, Heaven re-signed with the team. In three seasons, he played 32 games at guard and tackle. Heaven became a free agent after the 2004 season.
