= Tom Canada =

American gridiron football player (born 1980)

No. 44
- Position: Defensive end

Personal information
- Born: January 8, 1980 (age 46); Iowa City, Iowa, U.S.
- Listed height: 6 ft 3 in (1.91 m)
- Listed weight: 255 lb (116 kg)

Career information
- College: California

Career history
- 2004–2008: Winnipeg Blue Bombers

Awards and highlights
- CFL East All-Star (2007); CFL West All-Star (2004)
- Stats at CFL.ca (archive)

Tom Canada (born January 8, 1980) is an American former professional football defensive end who played for the Winnipeg Blue Bombers of the Canadian Football League (CFL).

== Early life ==
Canada attended Mt. Whitney High School in Visalia, California, and as a senior middle linebacker, received All-League honors and was named the West Yosemite League Player of the Year. He played college football at the University of California at Berkeley.

== Professional career ==
Canada joined the Winnipeg Blue Bombers of the CFL in 2004, and started all 18 games of the year for them. His play earned him the club’s Most Outstanding Rookie Award, and he was named a West Division All-Star. He continued his good play in the 2005 CFL season and the 2006 CFL season, once again starting all 18 games. In the 2007 CFL season his stellar play continued with the Bombers and was named a West Division All-Star for the second time in his career.

In the 2008 CFL season Canada's performance suffered along with the Blue Bombers, prompting Winnipeg to initiate a trade that was to send him to Hamilton in exchange for Zeke Moreno. Over the course of the trade negotiations it was determined that Canada had an enlarged spleen and would likely be out for the rest of the season. The Bombers still acquired Moreno in exchange for a 2009 first round pick and the CFL rights to Corey Mace.

On February 6, 2009, Canada was released by the Blue Bombers.

Canada is currently an Olympic style weightlifting coach at CrossFit Sandpoint in Sandpoint, ID.
