= Scott Coe =

Canadian football player (born 1980)

Profile
- Position: Linebacker

Personal information
- Born: March 16, 1980 (age 46); Winnipeg, Manitoba
- Listed height: 6 ft 3 in (1.91 m)
- Listed weight: 230 lb (104 kg)

Career information
- University: Manitoba
- CFL draft: 2002: 5th round, 43rd overall pick

Career history
- 2002–2003: Hamilton Tiger-Cats
- 2004–2007: Calgary Stampeders
- 2008: Edmonton Eskimos
- Stats at CFL.ca

Scott Coe (born March 16, 1980, in Winnipeg, Manitoba) is a Canadian former professional football linebacker. He was drafted by the Hamilton Tiger-Cats in the fifth round of the 2002 CFL draft. He played high school football at Kelvin High School in Winnipeg and college football at the University of Manitoba.

Coe has also played for the Calgary Stampeders and Edmonton Eskimos.
