= Denny Fortney =

American gridiron football player (born 1974)

No. 90
- Position: Defensive tackle

Personal information
- Born: December 27, 1974 (age 51); Hagerstown, Maryland, U.S.
- Listed height: 6 ft 4 in (1.93 m)
- Listed weight: 280 lb (127 kg)

Career information
- High school: Waynesboro (Waynesboro, Pennsylvania)
- College: Miami (1993–1997)
- NFL draft: 1998: undrafted

Career history
- Dallas Cowboys (1998–1999)*; New Jersey Red Dogs (2000); Winnipeg Blue Bombers (2001–2004)
- * Offseason or practice squad member only

Awards and highlights
- CFL All-Star (2002); CFL West All-Star (2002)

Career CFL statistics
- Games played: 56
- Tackles: 90
- Sacks: 8
- Interceptions: 1
- Pass deflections: 10
- Forced fumbles: 1
- Fumble recoveries: 6
- Stats at CFL.ca
- Stats at ArenaFan.com

Dennis Allen Fortney (born December 27, 1974) is an American former professional football defensive tackle who played for the Winnipeg Blue Bombers of the Canadian Football League (CFL). He played college football for the Miami Hurricanes.

== Early life ==
Fortney was born on December 27, 1974, in Hagerstown, Maryland. He attended Waynesboro Area Senior High School in Waynesboro, Pennsylvania. Fortney started 43 games and played at linebacker and tight end and earned AP second-team all-state. He committed to play college football for the University of Miami.

== College career ==
Fortney played college football for the Miami Hurricanes from 1993 to 1997 and was a four-year letterman from 1994 to 1997.

== Professional career ==
=== Dallas Cowboys ===
After going undrafted in the 1998 NFL draft, Fortney signed with the Dallas Cowboys as an undrafted free agent. On August 29, he was waived by the team. On September 8, Fortney was signed to the practice squad. On January 9, 1999, he signed a reserve/futures contract with the Cowboys. On August 31, Fortney was released.

=== New Jersey Red Dogs ===
In 2000, Fortney played in nine games for the New Jersey Red Dogs for the Arena Football League (AFL). He had nine tackles and one sack.

=== Winnipeg Blue Bombers ===
On March 7, 2001, Fortney was signed by the Winnipeg Blue Bombers of the Canadian Football League (CFL). In his rookie season, he had 35 tackles, four pass deflections, one forced fumble and four fumble recoveries. In 2002, Fortney made 22 tackles, seven sacks, four pass break ups and one fumble recovery. He earned CFL West All-Star and CFL All-Star honors.

On March 5, 2003, Fortney re-signed with the Blue Bombers. After signing, he had 30 tackles, one sack, one interception, four pass deflections and a fumble recovery in 18 games. In 2004, Fortney played in two games, recording three tackles and a fumble recovery before he was placed on the injury list with an ankle injury. After the season he became a free agent and retired.
