= Michael Shaver =

Canadian-British polymer scientist

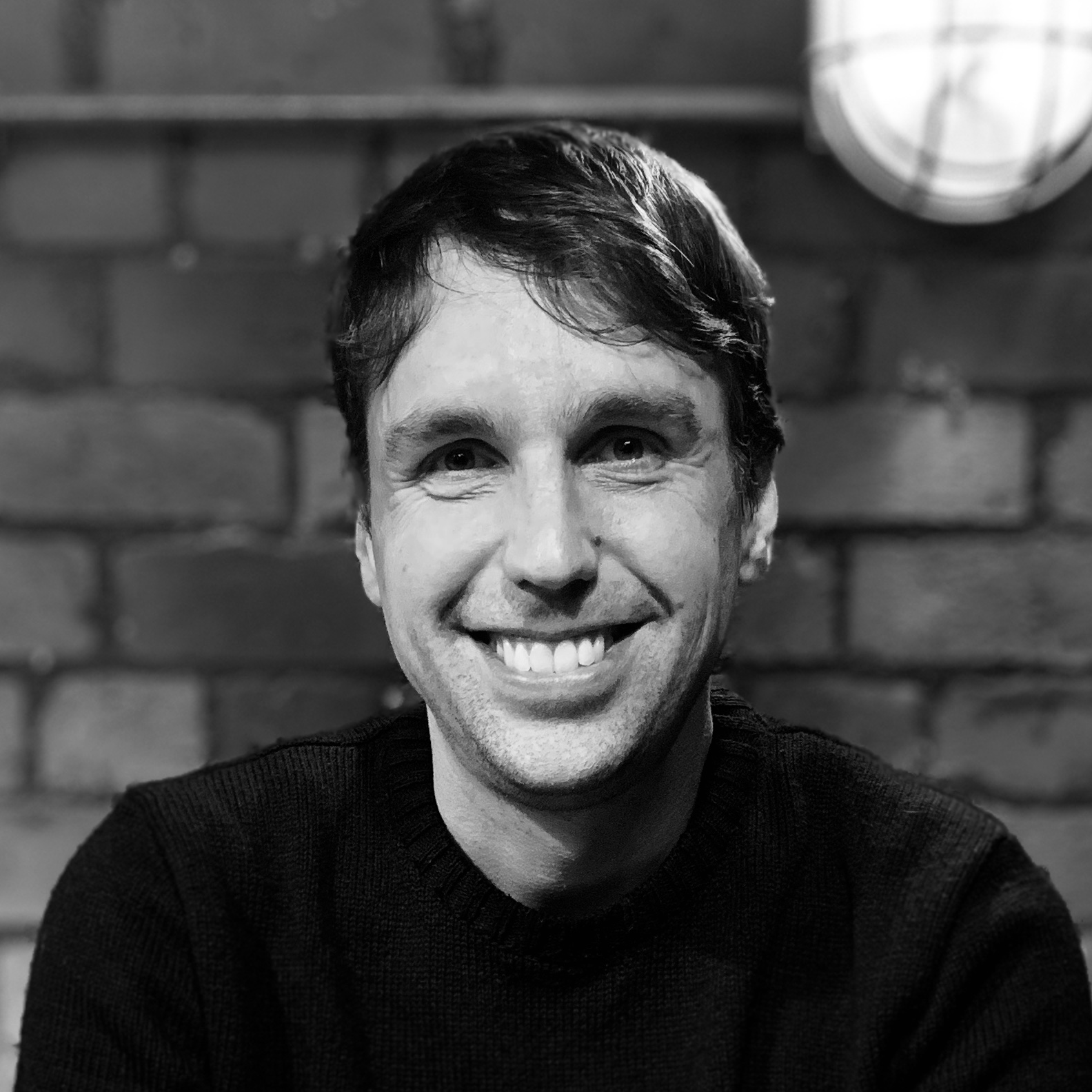
- Shaver in 2019
- Born: Canada
- Education: Mount Allison University (BSc); University of British Columbia (PhD); Imperial College London (postdoc)
- Awards: Fellow of the Royal Society of Chemistry (FRSC) (2017); Fellow of the Institute of Materials, Minerals and Mining (FIMMM) (2019); IOM3 Swinburne Medal (2024)
- Scientific career
- Fields: Polymer science, Materials science, Sustainability
- Institutions: University of Manchester; University of Edinburgh; University of Prince Edward Island
- Website: smihub.ac.uk

Michael Shaver is Professor of Polymer Science in the Department of Materials at the University of Manchester, Director of the Sustainable Materials Innovation (SMI) Hub, and a Fellow of the Royal Society of Chemistry and the Institute of Materials, Minerals and Mining (IOM3). He is a polymer scientist specialising in the sustainability and circularity of plastics, and his research addresses mechanical, chemical and enzymatic recycling of plastics, sustainable polymer design, and systems-level approaches to materials circularity.

== Education ==
Shaver completed his Bachelor of Science in Chemistry at Mount Allison University in 1999. He then earned a PhD in Chemistry from the University of British Columbia in 2005, with a dissertation entitled Small Molecule Activation by Diamidophosphine Complexes of Vanadium, Niobium and Tantalum. He subsequently undertook an NSERC Postdoctoral Fellowship at Imperial College London.

== Career ==
Shaver began his academic career at the University of Prince Edward Island (UPEI), where he was appointed Assistant Professor of Inorganic Chemistry in 2007. He rose to full Research Professor and held the UPEI Research Chair in Green Materials Chemistry from 2009.

In 2012, he moved to the University of Edinburgh as a Chancellor's Fellow in the School of Chemistry, an early-career fellowship. He was subsequently promoted, becoming Professor of Polymer Chemistry in August 2017, and during his time at Edinburgh served as Head of the Graduate School in the School of Chemistry from 2014.

He joined the University of Manchester as Professor of Polymer Science in January 2019, based in the Department of Materials within the School of Natural Sciences. He became Director of the Sustainable Materials Innovation Hub (SMI Hub) in July 2020, and was the inaugural Director of Sustainable Futures, the university's platform for interdisciplinary environmental sustainability research, from 2021.

In 2023, he was appointed the Vita Group / Royal Academy of Engineering Research Chair in Sustainable Automotive Polymers.

== Research ==
Part of his research concerns the degradation of plastics during mechanical recycling, where used plastic is sorted, washed, melted and re-formed. Another 2024 study published in Nature Communications developed methods for quantifying and tracking the chemical degradation of high-density polyethylene (HDPE) through mechanical recycling cycling. A further topic has been developing methods to quantify the proportion of recycled content in plastic products and packaging.

Shaver and his group have also worked on chemical recycling, which breaks down polymer chains back to their monomer constituents for re-polymerisation.

Michael Shaver has been an active contributor to plastics policy in the UK and internationally.

== Honours and recognition ==
- Fellow of the Royal Society of Chemistry (FRSC), elected 2017
- Fellow of the Institute of Materials, Minerals and Mining (FIMMM), elected 2019
- Vita Group / Royal Academy of Engineering Research Chair in Sustainable Automotive Polymers, 2023-2028
- Institute of Materials, Minerals and Mining Swinburne Medal, 2024, awarded for outstanding contribution to the advancement and knowledge of the science, engineering or technology of plastics

== Selected publications ==
- Schyns, Z. O. G.; Shaver, M. P. "Mechanical Recycling of Packaging Plastics: A Review." Macromolecular Rapid Communications 2021, 42, 2000415.
- Patel, A. D.; Schyns, Z. O. G.; Franklin, T. W.; Shaver, M. P. "Defining quality by quantifying degradation in the mechanical recycling of polyethylene." Nature Communications 2024, 15, 8733.
- Clark, R. A.; Shaver, M. P. (2024). "Depolymerisation within a circular plastics system". Chemical Reviews. 124: 2617. doi:10.1021/acs.chemrev.3c00575.
