= Alexandre Gauthier =

Canadian football player (born 1976)

Alex Gauthier
Profile
- Position: Offensive left tackle

Personal information
- Born: December 8, 1976 (age 49); Maria, Quebec, Canada
- Listed height: 6 ft 7 in (2.01 m)
- Listed weight: 330 lb (150 kg)

Career information
- University: Laval
- CFL draft: 2002: 1st round, 1st overall pick

Career history
- 2002–2005: Ottawa Renegades
- 2006: Calgary Stampeders
- 2007–2008: Winnipeg Blue Bombers
- 2009–2010: Hamilton Tiger-Cats
- 2011: Saskatchewan Roughriders

Awards and highlights
- CFL East All-Star (2007)
- Stats at CFL.ca (archive)

Alex Gauthier (born December 8, 1976) is a Canadian football offensive lineman who is currently retired. He most recently played for the Saskatchewan Roughriders of the Canadian Football League. He was drafted first overall by the expansion Ottawa Renegades in the 2002 CFL draft. He was a CFL East All-Star in 2007. Gauthier was signed by the Roughriders in 2011. He played CIS football for the Laval Rouge et Or.
