= Aaron Fiacconi =

Canadian football player (born 1979)

Profile
- Position: Offensive lineman

Personal information
- Born: November 12, 1979 (age 46); Sault Ste. Marie, Ontario, Canada
- Listed height: 6 ft 4 in (1.93 m)
- Listed weight: 298 lb (135 kg)

Career information
- High school: St. Mary's College
- College: Mansfield
- CFL draft: 2002: 4th round, 32nd overall pick

Career history
- 2002–2005: Montreal Alouettes
- 2005–2007: Winnipeg Blue Bombers
- 2007–2011: Edmonton Eskimos

Awards and highlights
- Eskimos' Most Outstanding Offensive Player (2010); Sault Ste Marie Sports Hall of Fame (2015); Mansfield University Athletic Hall of Fame (2023)
- Stats at CFL.ca

Aaron Fiacconi (born November 12, 1979) is a Canadian former professional football offensive lineman. He announced his retirement on June 2, 2012. He most recently played for five seasons for the Edmonton Eskimos of the Canadian Football League. He was signed as fourth round draft pick (32nd overall) by the Montreal Alouettes in the 2002 CFL draft. He played college football at Mansfield.

Fiacconi has also played for the Winnipeg Blue Bombers. Currently, he stays involved in football by coaching offensive linemen at a high school in the Edmonton Area. Fiacconi was inducted into the Sault Ste Marie Sports Hall of Fame in 2015. In November 2017, Fiacconi became a member of the Edmonton Police Service.
