= Matt Sheridan =

Canadian football player (born 1977)

No. 54
- Position: Offensive lineman

Personal information
- Born: May 27, 1977 (age 49); Montreal, Quebec, Canada
- Listed height: 6 ft 3 in (1.91 m)
- Listed weight: 383 lb (174 kg)

Career information
- High school: Sturgeon Creek Collegiate
- University: Manitoba
- CFL draft: 2000: 6th round, 40th overall pick

Career history
- 2001–2008: Winnipeg Blue Bombers
- 2010: Calgary Stampeders

Awards and highlights
- Ed Kotowich Good Guy Award (2004); Winnipeg's Most Outstanding offensive lineman (2004, 2005)
- Stats at CFL.ca

Matt Sheridan (born May 27, 1977) is a Canadian former professional football offensive lineman who played eight seasons with the Winnipeg Blue Bombers of the Canadian Football League (CFL) and was twice named Winnipeg's Most Outstanding offensive lineman.

Sheridan was born in Montreal, grew up in Winnipeg, and played CIS football for the Manitoba Bisons. He was drafted in the sixth round of the 2000 CFL draft by the Blue Bombers. He joined the team's practice squad at the start of the 2001 CFL season.

== Professional career ==
Sheridan made his professional debut in week 15 of the 2001 season and made his first start the following week. He ended up playing the remainder of the season for a total of four regular season games as well as the East Division final and the 89th Grey Cup.

Sheridan started the first two games of the 2002 CFL season but a back injury caused him to miss 12 of the 18 regular season matches as well as the playoffs. The 2003 CFL season saw Sheridan bounce back and start all regular season games and the West Division semi-final. His playing streak continued in the 2004 CFL season, starting all 18 regular season games at left guard and Sheridan was honoured with the Ed Kotowich Good Guy Award for "best combining football ability, team camaraderie, and extraordinary effort off the field in the community" and was named the Bombers Most Outstanding offensive lineman.

Sheridan continued his playing streak and superior play for the 2005 CFL season, the third straight year he played all regular season games and again named Winnipeg's Most Outstanding offensive lineman. He was also named the CFL Lineman of Week 8 and was the Blue Bombers nomination for the Tom Pate Memorial Award, recognising his contributions to the community.

The last three years of Sheridan's play in Winnipeg was limited by injury beginning in the 2006 CFL season, in which a nagging groin injury caused him to only five starts and play in seven regular season games. He was able to return strongly for the 2007 CFL season, starting 15 regular season games at left guard and the East semi-final, East final, and 95th Grey Cup and considered a big reason the Bombers' offensive line gave up the fewest quarterback sacks (27) in the CFL and running back Charles Roberts rushed for 1,379 yards and 16 touchdowns.

The 2008 CFL season appeared promising when Blue Bombers general manager Brendan Taman re-signed him in February and said "Matt Sheridan has been a big part of this team for some time now and we are glad he will continue to be for the foreseeable future". A groin re-injury suffered in training camp, however, saw him miss the beginning of the season and by his expected return in mid-July, a reported shoulder injury caused the Bombers to place him on the nine-game injured list. General Manager Taman suggested then that his time with the organisation was likely over and, on January 31, 2009, new Winnipeg head coach Mike Kelly said that Sheridan was "another guy who needed a fresh start elsewhere" and he was released.

On April 29, 2010, it was announced that Sheridan had signed with the Calgary Stampeders, on June 21, 2010 he retired from football.
