= 2002 Toronto Argonauts season =

CFL team season

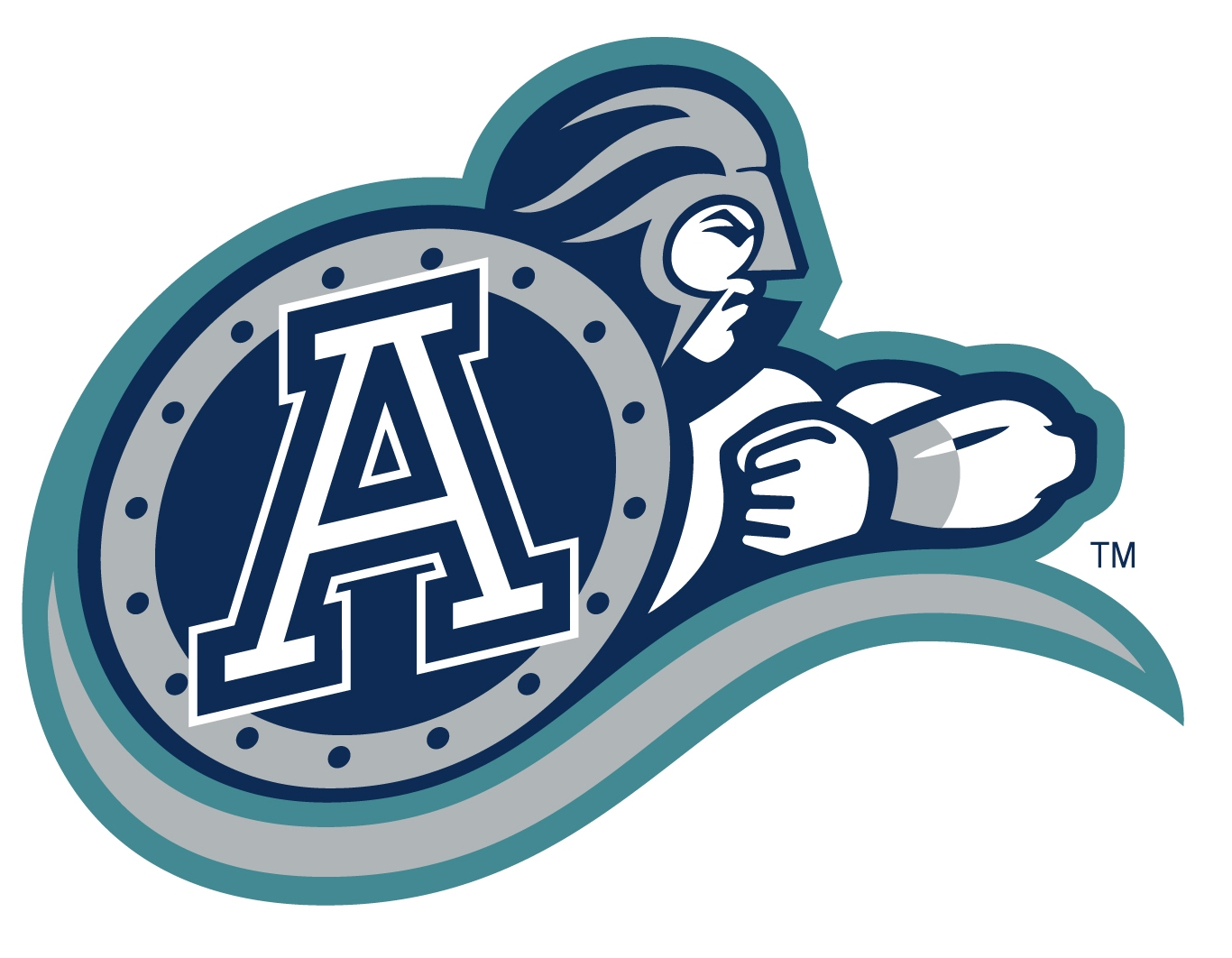
- Head coach: Gary Etcheverry (4–8); Michael "Pinball" Clemons (4–2)
- Home stadium: SkyDome

Results
- Record: 8–10
- Division place: 2nd, East
- Playoffs: Lost East Final

Uniform

The 2002 Toronto Argonauts finished in second place in the East Division of the 2002 CFL season with an 8–10 record. They won the East Semi-Final but lost the East Final.

== Offseason ==
=== CFL draft ===
Rd	Pick	Player	Position	School
1	3	Cory Annett	OL	Eastern Michigan
3	21	Robin Tremblay	DE	Houston
4	28	Rob Stewart	DT	Manitoba
4	30	Alexis Sanschagrin	DB	Western
5	39	Marvin Brereton	RB	Buffalo
5	45	Chuck Walsh	LB	Waterloo
6	48	Sean Spender	LB	Guelph
6	49	Jarel Cockburn	WR	Columbia
6	54	Darryl Ray	WR	Ottawa

=== Preseason ===
The Argonauts were the home team for a neutral site pre-season game in London, Ontario which was played at TD Waterhouse Stadium.

Week	Date	Opponent	Location	Final score	Attendance	Record
A	June 13	@ Renegades	Frank Clair Stadium	W 18 – 11	19,213	1–0
B	June 21	Tiger-Cats	TD Waterhouse Stadium	L 37 – 17	9,178	1–1

== Regular season ==
=== Season standings ===
East Division
Pos	Team	Pld	W	L	T	OTL	PF	PA	PD	Pts
1	Montreal Alouettes (C, Q)	18	13	4	0	1	587	407	+180	27
2	Toronto Argonauts (Q)	18	8	10	0	0	344	482	−138	16
3	Hamilton Tiger-Cats	18	7	10	0	1	427	524	−97	15
4	Ottawa Renegades	18	4	12	0	2	356	550	−194	10

Source: "CFL.ca". Archived from the original on 2009-06-29.
(C) First round bye; (Q) Qualified for playoffs

=== Regular season ===
Week	Date	Opponent	Location	Final score	Attendance	Record
1	June 28	@ Blue Bombers	Canad Inns Stadium	L 39 – 15	24,063	0–1
2	July 3	Alouettes	SkyDome	L 28 – 12	21,175	0–2
3	July 9	@ Lions	BC Place Stadium	W 30 – 22	15,796	1–2
3	July 13	@ Eskimos	Commonwealth Stadium	L 31 – 17	33,108	1–3
4	Bye					
5	July 23	Blue Bombers	SkyDome	L 42 – 15	21,724	1–4
6	August 1	Renegades	SkyDome	W 24 – 8	18,734	2–4
7	August 8	@ Stampeders	McMahon Stadium	L 31 – 11	31,920	2–5
8	August 16	Roughriders	SkyDome	W 18 – 10	19,652	3–5
9	August 23	Eskimos	SkyDome	L 30 – 7	23,642	3–6
10	September 2	@ Tiger-Cats	Ivor Wynne Stadium	L 22 – 14	25,327	3–7
11	September 7	@ Renegades	Frank Clair Stadium	W 30 – 25	21,604	4–7
12	September 15	@ Roughriders	Taylor Field	L 40 – 11	24,387	4–8
13	September 22	Tiger-Cats	SkyDome	W 28 – 21	18,932	5–8
14	September 29	@ Alouettes	Molson Stadium	L 38 – 3	20,002	5–9
15	October 5	Lions	SkyDome	L 23 – 18	16,827	5–10
16	October 14	@ Tiger-Cats	Ivor Wynne Stadium	W 29 – 28 (OT)	20,216	6–10
17	October 20	Renegades	SkyDome	W 29 – 12	24,932	7–10
18	Bye					
19	November 3	Stampeders	SkyDome	W 33 – 32	19,232	8–10

== Postseason ==
Round	Date	Opponent	Location	Final score	Attendance
East Semi-Final	November 10	Roughriders	SkyDome	W 24–14	23,124
East Final	November 17	@ Alouettes	Olympic Stadium	L 35–18	57,125

== Roster ==
2002 Toronto Argonauts final roster
Quarterbacks: 4 Jim Ballard; 3 Marcus Brady; 14 Reggie Slack; Running backs: 34 Shawn Daniels; 29 Robert Drummond; 33 Jeff Johnson; Receivers: 82 Ted Alford; 86 Demetris Bendross; 87 Derrell Mitchell; 18 Mike Morreale; 81 Darryl Ray; 9 Andre Talbot	Offensive linemen: 63 Corey Annett C/G; 65 Sandy Annunziata G; 56 Chad Folk C; 62 Dwayne Morgan T; 58 Tom Rayam T; 66 Jude St. John G; 61 John Terry T; Defensive linemen: 89 Leroy Blugh DE; 70 Roger Dunbrack DT; 91 Demetrious Maxie DT; 53 Joe Montford DE; 72 Johnny Scott DT; 90 Chuck Walsh DE	Linebackers: 30 Charles Assmann; 37 Orlando Bowen; 35 Kevin Eiben; 38 Reggie Givens; 50 Mike O'Shea; 45 Randy Srochenski; Defensive backs: 10 Antonious Bonner; 6 Brad Elberg; 2 Michael Fletcher; 25 Martavious Houston; 13 Clifford Ivory; 23 Bashir Levingston; 12 Adrion Smith; 21 Orlondo Steinauer	Special teams: 1 Noel Prefontaine K/P; Injured list: 7 Michael Bishop QB; 5 Jimmy Cunningham WR; 16 Stanley Jackson QB; 26 Juan Johnson RB; 19 Kris Neal DB; 64 Garry Sawatzky G; Italics indicate International player

== Awards and records ==
=== 2002 CFL All-Stars ===
- DE – Joe Montford
- DB – Clifford Ivory
- DS – Orlondo Steinauer
- P – Noel Prefontaine

=== Eastern Division All-Star Selections ===
- SB – Derrell Mitchell
- OG – Sandy Annunziata
- DT – Johnny Scott
- DE – Joe Montford
- CB – Adrion Smith
- DB – Clifford Ivory
- P – Noel Prefontaine
- K – Noel Prefontaine
