= Chris Cvetkovic =

Canadian football player (born 1977)

No. 50
- Position: Long snapper

Personal information
- Born: June 28, 1977 (age 49); Hamilton, Ontario, Canada

Career information
- College: Concordia

Career history
- 2002–2003: Saskatchewan Roughriders
- 2003–2013: Winnipeg Blue Bombers
- Stats at CFL.ca (archive)

Chris Cvetkovic (born June 28, 1977) is a Canadian former professional football long snapper. He was originally signed by the Saskatchewan Roughriders as an undrafted free agent in 2002. Claimed off the Riders' practice roster by the Winnipeg Blue Bombers during the 2003 playoffs, he played 10 seasons in Winnipeg until retiring. He played CIS Football for Concordia.

Cvetkovic announced his retirement on February 10, 2014.
