= Jon Oosterhuis =

Canadian gridiron football player (born 1977)

No. 77
- Position: Fullback

Personal information
- Born: June 13, 1977 (age 49); Fergus, Ontario, Canada
- Listed height: 6 ft 4 in (1.93 m)
- Listed weight: 280 lb (127 kg)

Career information
- College: New Hampshire
- CFL draft: 2002: 1st round, 8th overall pick

Career history
- 2002: Calgary Stampeders*
- 2002–2011: Winnipeg Blue Bombers
- * Offseason or practice squad member only
- Stats at CFL.ca

Jon Oosterhuis (born June 13, 1977) is a Canadian former professional football fullback for the Winnipeg Blue Bombers of the Canadian Football League (CFL). He was drafted by the Calgary Stampeders with the eighth overall pick in the 2002 CFL draft. He played college football at New Hampshire.

On Saturday, June 4, 2011, Oosterhuis was released by the Winnipeg Football Club for failing his physical.
