= 2001 BC Lions season =

Canadian football team season

- General manager: Adam Rita
- Head coach: Steve Buratto
- Home stadium: BC Place Stadium

Results
- Record: 8–10
- Division place: 3rd, West
- Playoffs: Lost West Semi-Final

The 2001 BC Lions finished in third place in the West Division with an 8–10 record. They appeared in the West-Semi Final.

== Offseason ==
=== CFL draft ===
Rd	Pick	Player	Position	School
1	2	Ian Williams	LB	Memphis
1	3	Lyle Green	FB	Toledo
1	8	Leif Thorsen	G	Montana
2	16	Jamie Boreham	K/WR	Saskatchewan
3	24	Scott Robinson	WR	Simon Fraser
4	32	Kelly Bates	OL	Saskatchewan
5	40	Dave Tucker	LB	Manitoba
6	48	Eric Collings	OL	British Columbia

== Preseason ==
Week	Date	Opponent	Score	Result	Record
A	June 21	at Saskatchewan Roughriders	19–14	Loss	0–1
B	June 26	vs. Calgary Stampeders	35–28	Loss	0–2

== Regular season ==
=== Season standings ===
West Division
Pos	Team	Pld	W	T	L	OTL	PF	PA	PD	Pts
1	Edmonton Eskimos (C, Q)	18	9	0	8	1	439	463	−24	19
2	Calgary Stampeders (Q)	18	8	0	9	1	478	476	+2	17
3	BC Lions (Q)	18	8	0	10	0	417	445	−28	16
4	Saskatchewan Roughriders	18	6	0	12	0	308	416	−108	12

Source: "CFL.ca". Archived from the original on 2009-06-29.
(C) First round bye; (Q) Qualified for playoffs

=== Season schedule ===
Week	Date	Opponent	Score	Result	Record
1	July 7	vs. Edmonton Eskimos	35–28	Win	1–0
2	July 12	at Hamilton Tiger-Cats	26–5	Loss	1–1
3	July 21	vs. Saskatchewan Roughriders	12–7	Loss	1–2
4	July 27	at Calgary Stampeders	35–28	Loss	1–3
5	August 4	vs. Montreal Alouettes	44–31	Win	2–3
6	August 11	vs. Edmonton Eskimos	42–39	Win	3–3
7	August 17	at Edmonton Eskimos	35–17	Win	4–3
8	August 25	vs. Calgary Stampeders	27–13	Win	5–3
9	August 31	at Montreal Alouettes	23–19	Loss	5–4
10	Sept 8	at Toronto Argonauts	32–17	Loss	5–5
11	Sept 15	vs. Hamilton Tiger-Cats	Postponed		
12	Sept 23	at Saskatchewan Roughriders	17–15	Win	6–5
13	Sept 28	at Winnipeg Blue Bombers	23–22	Loss	6–6
14	Oct 6	vs. Toronto Argonauts	34–17	Loss	6–7
15	Oct 12	at Edmonton Eskimos	28–22	Loss	6–8
16	Oct 20	vs. Winnipeg Blue Bombers	26–18	Loss	6–9
17	Oct 28	at Calgary Stampeders	34–16	Win	7–9
18	Nov 3	vs. Saskatchewan Roughriders	42–10	Loss	7–10
18	Nov 6	vs. Hamilton Tiger-Cats	24–12	Win	8–10

== Awards and records ==
- Barrin Simpson, Outstanding Rookie
- Barrin Simpson, Norm Fieldgate Trophy

== Playoffs ==
=== West Semi-Final ===
Team	Q1	Q2	Q3	Q4	Total
BC Lions	4	11	1	3	19
Calgary Stampeders	0	10	0	18	28

== Roster ==
2001 BC Lions final roster
Quarterbacks: 9 Damon Allen; 16 Tony Corbin; 12 David Rivers; Running backs: 29 Robert Drummond; 28 Lyle Green; 19 Mike Maurer; 25 Sean Millington; Receivers: 8 Bret Anderson K; 7 Alfred Jackson; 83 Mel Long; 89 Denis Montana; 85 Jimmy Oliver; 81 Geroy Simon	Offensive linemen: 55 Ben Fairbrother G; 61 Steve Hardin T; 59 Craig Hendrickson G; 68 Cory Mantyka G; 57 Dan Payne T; 60 Jamie Taras C; 69 Wes White T; Defensive linemen: 92 Noah Cantor DT; 97 Brent Johnson DE; 95 Cameron Legault DT; 91 Herman Smith DE; Special teams: 14 Matt Kellett K/P; 20 Tony Martino P	Linebackers: 56 Daved Benefield; 6 Michael Fletcher; 49 Jason Kralt; 4 Chris Nofoaiga; Defensive backs: 23 Curtis Anderson; 2 Eric Carter; 37 Mike Crumb; 3 Sedrick Curry; 11 Warner Herndon; 26 Carl Kidd; 17 Bo Lewis; 34 Shane Sharpe	Injured list: 31 Tyrone Bell DB; 10 Jason Crumb DB; 27 Toya Jones DB; 80 Darnell McDonald WR; 64 Angus Reid C; 18 Tyrone Taylor WR; 84 Ryan Thelwell WR; 93 Ian Williams LB; Suspended: -- Ink Aleaga LB; -- Jason Chorak DE; -- Damon Cogdell LB; -- Casey Dailey LB; 21 Keith Heyward DB; Italics indicate International player
