= 2001 Saskatchewan Roughriders season =

CFL team season

- General manager: Roy Shivers
- Head coach: Danny Barrett
- Home stadium: Taylor Field

Results
- Record: 6–12
- Division place: 4th, West
- Playoffs: did not qualify
- Team MOP: Darren Davis
- Team MOC: Shawn Gallant
- Team MOR: Omar Evans

The 2001 Saskatchewan Roughriders finished in fourth place in the West Division with a 6–12 record and missed the playoffs for the fourth year in a row.

== Offseason ==
=== CFL draft ===
Round	Pick	Player	Position	School/Club team
1	1	Scott Schultz	Defensive lineman	North Dakota
2	9	Jason French	Wide receiver	Murray State
3	17	Teddy Neptune	Linebacker	Ottawa
5	33	Mike Di Battista	Wide Receiver	Ottawa
6	41	Jocelyn Frenette	Offensive Guard	Ottawa

=== Preseason ===
Week	Date	Opponent	Score	Result	Attendance
A	Thurs, June 21	vs. BC Lions	19–14	Win	21,564
B	Wed, June 27	at Edmonton Eskimos	24–9	Win	28,579

== Regular season ==
=== Season standings ===
West Division
Pos	Team	Pld	W	L	T	OTL	PF	PA	PD	Pts
1	Edmonton Eskimos (C, Q)	18	9	8	0	1	439	463	−24	19
2	Calgary Stampeders (Q)	18	8	9	0	1	478	476	+2	17
3	BC Lions (Q)	18	8	10	0	0	417	445	−28	16
4	Saskatchewan Roughriders	18	6	12	0	0	308	416	−108	12

Source: "CFL.ca". Archived from the original on 2009-06-29.
(C) First round bye; (Q) Qualified for playoffs

=== Season schedule ===
Week	Date	Opponent	Score	Result	Attendance	Record
1	Fri, July 6	vs. Hamilton Tiger-Cats	30–28	Win	23,421	1–0
2	Fri, July 13	at Edmonton Eskimos	13–11	Loss	32,722	1–1
3	Sat, July 21	at BC Lions	12–7	Win	19,409	2–1
4	Sat, July 28	vs. Toronto Argonauts	50–24	Loss	27,255	2–2
5	Fri, Aug 3	at Winnipeg Blue Bombers	32–14	Loss	27,310	2–3
6	Sat, Aug 11	vs. Calgary Stampeders	35–4	Loss	22,438	2–4
7	Fri, Aug 17	at Calgary Stampeders	37–13	Loss	35,967	2–5
8	Sat, Aug 25	at Toronto Argonauts	14–11	Win	18,378	3–5
9	Sun, Sept 2	vs. Winnipeg Blue Bombers	20–18	Loss	30,127	3–6
10	Sun, Sept 9	vs. Montreal Alouettes	31–3	Loss	18,358	3–7
11	Mon, Sept 17	at Calgary Stampeders	21–14	Loss	32,548	3–8
12	Sun, Sept 23	vs. BC Lions	17–15	Loss	19,777	3–9
13	Sat, Sept 29	vs. Edmonton Eskimos	35–19	Loss	18,086	3–10
14	Mon, Oct 8	at Montreal Alouettes	13–7	Win	19,601	4–10
15	Sun, Oct 14	vs. Calgary Stampeders	29–26	Loss	18,496	4–11
16	Sun, Oct 21	at Hamilton Tiger-Cats	30–24	Loss	17,266	4–12
17	Sat, Oct 27	vs. Edmonton Eskimos	12–3	Win	20,917	5–12
18	Sat, Nov 3	at BC Lions	42–10	Win	20,684	6–12

# Games played with primary home uniforms.
# Games played with primary white uniforms.
# Games played with black uniforms.

== Roster ==
2001 Saskatchewan Roughriders final roster
Quarterbacks: 13 Neo Aoga; 18 Jonathan Beasley; 5 Kevin Glenn; Running backs: 8 Darren Davis; 20 Kennedy Nkeyasen; 14 Rock Preston; 33 Chris Szarka; Receivers: 6 Derick Armstrong; 86 Demetris Bendross; 22 Dylan Ching; 10 Dan Farthing; 87 Jason French; 82 Lloyd Henry	Offensive linemen: 67 Dan Comiskey G; 64 Shawn Gifford T; 68 Andrew Greene G; 60 Gene Makowsky T; 57 Andrew Moore C; 54 Jeremy O'Day C/T; Defensive linemen: 98 Nathan Davis DT; 91 Demetrious Maxie DE; 92 Sheldon Napastuk DE/DT; 58 Shonte Peoples DE; 96 Scott Schultz DT; Special teams: 4 Paul McCallum K/P; 17 Mike O'Brien K	Linebackers: 74 Troy Asbell; 46 Armand Boglin; 48 Trevis Smith; 79 Tyson St. James; 38 George White; Defensive backs: 29 Eddie Davis; 25 Omar Evans; 27 Stéphane Fortin; 2 Shawn Gallant; 21 Jason Mallett; 1 LaDouphyous McCalla; 24 Jackie Mitchell; 3 Omarr Morgan	Injured list: 95 Andre Brown DE; 31 Davin Bush DB; 97 Brooks Findlay LB; 7 Marvin Graves QB; 84 Eric Guliford SB; 90 Cedric Harden DE; 19 Corey Holmes RB; 88 Curtis Marsh WR; 39 Teddy Neptune LB; 72 Colin Scrivener DT; 12 Keith Smith QB; 45 Randy Srochenski LS; 51 John Terry T; Suspended: 66 Carlo Panaro T; Italics indicate American player

== Awards and records ==
=== CFL All-Star Selections ===
None

=== Western All-Star Selections ===
- Darren Davis, Running Back
- Eddie Davis, Defensive Back
- Andrew Greene, Offensive Guard
- Omarr Morgan, Cornerback
- Shont'e Peoples, Defensive End
- George White, Linebacker
