= 2001 Edmonton Eskimos season =

Canadian football team season

- General manager: Tom Higgins
- Head coach: Tom Higgins
- Home stadium: Commonwealth Stadium

Results
- Record: 9–9–0–1
- Division place: 1st, West
- Playoffs: Lost West Final
- Team MOP: John Avery, RB
- Team MOC: Sean Fleming, P/K
- Team MOR: Kelvin Powell, LB

Uniform

The 2001 Edmonton Eskimos finished first in the West Division with a 9–9–0–1 record, but lost the West Final to the Calgary Stampeders. This season's Eskimos became the first West Division team in CFL history to finish first in the division with only a .500 record.

== Offseason ==
=== CFL draft ===
Round	Pick	Player	Position	School/Club team
1	5	Randy Chevrier	DT	McGill
2	13	Fabian Burke	CB	Toledo
3	21	Glenn Carson	OL	Saskatchewan
5	37	Guillaume Petit	DL	Alberta
6	45	William Wright	DB	Bishop's

== Preseason ==
=== Schedule ===
#	Date	Visitor	Score	Home	OT	Attendance
A	June 20	Edmonton Eskimos	34–10	Calgary Stampeders		29,090
B	June 27	Saskatchewan Roughriders	24–9	Edmonton Eskimos		28,579

== Regular season ==
=== Season standings ===
West Division
Pos	Team	Pld	W	L	T	OTL	PF	PA	PD	Pts
1	Edmonton Eskimos (C, Q)	18	9	8	0	1	439	463	−24	19
2	Calgary Stampeders (Q)	18	8	9	0	1	478	476	+2	17
3	BC Lions (Q)	18	8	10	0	0	417	445	−28	16
4	Saskatchewan Roughriders	18	6	12	0	0	308	416	−108	12

Source: "CFL.ca". Archived from the original on 2009-06-29.
(C) First round bye; (Q) Qualified for playoffs

=== Season schedule ===
Week	Date	Visitor	Score	Home	OT	Attendance	Record	Pts
1	July 7	Edmonton Eskimos	28–35	BC Lions	OT	18,125	0–1–0–1	1
2	July 13	Saskatchewan Roughriders	11–13	Edmonton Eskimos		32,722	1–1–0–1	3
3	July 20	Calgary Stampeders	23–33	Edmonton Eskimos		33,524	2–1–0–1	5
4	July 26	Edmonton Eskimos	6–34	Montreal Alouettes		19,541	2–2–0–1	5
5	Aug 2	Edmonton Eskimos	24–14	Hamilton Tiger-Cats		17,107	3–2–0–1	7
6	Aug 11	Edmonton Eskimos	39–42	BC Lions		18,171	3–3–0–1	7
7	Aug 17	BC Lions	35–17	Edmonton Eskimos		35,394	3–4–0–1	7
8	Aug 24	Hamilton Tiger-Cats	20–12	Edmonton Eskimos		37,666	3–5–0–1	7
9	Sept 3	Edmonton Eskimos	33–32	Calgary Stampeders		35,967	4–5–0–1	9
10	Sept 7	Calgary Stampeders	34–33	Edmonton Eskimos		48,279	4–6–0–1	9
11	Sept 17	Edmonton Eskimos	22–23	Winnipeg Blue Bombers		26,144	4–7–0–1	9
12	Sept 21	Toronto Argonauts	22–23	Edmonton Eskimos		28,687	5–7–0–1	11
13	Sept 29	Edmonton Eskimos	35–19	Saskatchewan Roughriders		18,086	6–7–0–1	13
14	Oct 5	Winnipeg Blue Bombers	37–33	Edmonton Eskimos		29,659	6–8–0–1	13
15	Oct 12	BC Lions	22–28	Edmonton Eskimos		30,518	7–8–0–1	15
16	Oct 19	Edmonton Eskimos	25–22	Toronto Argonauts	OT	15,438	8–8–0–1	17
17	Oct 27	Edmonton Eskimos	3–12	Saskatchewan Roughriders		20,917	8–9–0–1	17
18	Nov 4	Montreal Alouettes	26–32	Edmonton Eskimos		43,123	9–9–0–1	19

Total attendance: 319,572
Average attendance: 35,510 (59.1%)

== Playoffs ==
Week	Date	Visitor	Score	Home	OT	Attendance
Division Final	Nov 18	Calgary Stampeders	34–16	Edmonton Eskimos		42,156

== Roster ==
2001 Edmonton Eskimos final roster
Quarterbacks: 7 Dan Crowley; 15 Nealon Greene; 12 Jason Maas; Running backs: 34 Shawn Daniels; 22 Mark Nohra; 20 Ronald Williams; Receivers: 84 Chris Brazzell; 81 Ed Hervey; 6 Quincy Jackson; 9 Winston October; 86 Scott Robinson; 3 Terry Vaughn	Offensive linemen: 50 Tim Bakker C; 62 Bruce Beaton T; 59 Leo Groenewegen G/C; 60 Chris Morris T; 53 Tim Prinsen G; 57 Val St. Germain G; Defensive linemen: 96 Steve Anderson DE; 92 Robert Brown DE; 98 Daaron McField DT; 94 Doug Petersen DT; 95 Albert Reese DT; 76 Jed Roberts DE	Linebackers: 30 Yves Dossous; 35 Jason Clemett; 31 Roger Reinson; 38 Ralph Staten; Defensive backs: 19 Fabian Burke; 18 Perry Carter; 10 Hency Charles; 17 Jermaine Jones; 5 Jackie Kellogg; 27 Singor Mobley; 28 Terry Ray; 16 Cordell Taylor; Special teams: 11 Sean Fleming K/P; 88 Hank Ilesic P/K	Injured list: 87 Donnie Ashley WR; -- Charles Assmann LB/LS; 32 Simon Baffoe RB; 1 Jon Baker K; 99 Sheldon Benoit LB; 33 Craig Carr RB; 64 Rick Cunningham T; 23 Shannon Garrett DB; 77 A. J. Gass LB; 44 Philippe Girard LB; 8 Chris Hardy DB; 80 Rob Harrod SB; 24 Andrew Henry DB; 56 George Hudson C; 85 Kez McCorvey WR; 41 Fred Perry DE; 29 Jerome Peterson DB; 36 Justin Ring LB; 72 Dario Romero DT; 13 Rick Walters WR; Italics indicate American player
