= 2001 Montreal Alouettes season =

Canadian football team season

- Head coach: Rod Rust; Jim Popp (Interim)
- Home stadium: Molson Stadium

Results
- Record: 9–9
- Division place: 3rd, East
- Playoffs: Lost East Semi-Final

Uniform

The 2001 Montreal Alouettes finished in third place in the East Division following a disastrous end to the season. After starting the season with a 9–2 record, Anthony Calvillo was injured in a game against the Hamilton Tiger-Cats and he missed several games, leading to the team losing its remaining seven games, as well as their playoff game, to finish the season with a 9–9 record. Head Coach Rod Rust was fired after 17 games and General Manager Jim Popp replaced him as interim Head Coach for the last regular season game and only playoff game losing both.

== Offseason ==
=== CFL draft ===
Round	Pick	Player	Position	School/Club team
1	7	Luke Fritz	OL	Eastern Washington
2	11	Pat Woodcock	WR	Syracuse
2	15	Jesse Palmer	QB	Florida
3	18	Phil Gibson	DL	Toledo
4	25	Shawn Gifford	OT	Charleston Southern
4	29	Peter Moore	DL	Syracuse
4	31	Steven Maheu	WR/QB	Simon Fraser
6	47	Phil Côté	QB	Ottawa

== Preseason ==
Week	Date	Opponent	Venue	Score	Result	Attendance	Record
A	June 21	Winnipeg Blue Bombers	Molson Stadium	31–12	Win	19,041	1–0
B	June 26	Hamilton Tiger-Cats	Ivor Wynne Stadium	20–18	Loss	15,584	1–1

== Regular season ==
=== Season standings ===
East Division
Pos	Team	Pld	W	L	T	OTL	PF	PA	PD	Pts
1	Winnipeg Blue Bombers (C, Q)	18	14	4	0	0	509	383	+126	28
2	Hamilton Tiger-Cats (Q)	18	11	7	0	0	440	420	+20	22
3	Montreal Alouettes (Q)	18	9	9	0	0	454	419	+35	18
4	Toronto Argonauts	18	7	10	0	1	432	455	−23	15

Source: "CFL.ca". Archived from the original on 2009-06-29.
(C) First round bye; (Q) Qualified for playoffs

=== Season schedule ===
Week	Date	Opponent	Venue	Score	Result	Attendance	Record
1	July 4	Toronto Argonauts	SkyDome	27–3	Win	14,065	1–0
2	July 12	Calgary Stampeders	Molson Stadium	32–14	Win	19,544	2–0
3	July 20	Winnipeg Blue Bombers	Canad Inns Stadium	37–34	Win	29,503	3–0
4	July 26	Edmonton Eskimos	Molson Stadium	34–6	Win	19,541	4–0
5	Aug 4	BC Lions	BC Place Stadium	44–31	Loss	18,185	4–1
6	Aug 10	Hamilton Tiger-Cats	Molson Stadium	27–17	Win	19,541	5–1
7	Aug 16	Toronto Argonauts	Molson Stadium	40–25	Win	19,541	6–1
8	Aug 24	Winnipeg Blue Bombers	Canad Inns Stadium	24–19	Loss	29,503	6–2
9	Aug 31	BC Lions	Molson Stadium	23–19	Win	19,541	7–2
10	Sept 9	Saskatchewan Roughriders	Taylor Field	31–3	Win	18,358	8–2
11	Sept 16	Toronto Argonauts	Molson Stadium	24–18	Win	19,541	9–2
12	Sept 23	Winnipeg Blue Bombers	Molson Stadium	28–25	Loss	19,601	9–3
13	Sept 30	Hamilton Tiger-Cats	Ivor Wynne Stadium	21–20	Loss	19,300	9–4
14	Oct 8	Saskatchewan Roughriders	Molson Stadium	13–7	Loss	19,601	9–5
15	Oct 13	Toronto Argonauts	SkyDome	51–24	Loss	17,258	9–6
16	Oct 20	Calgary Stampeders	McMahon Stadium	29–9	Loss	34,029	9–7
17	Oct 28	Hamilton Tiger-Cats	Molson Stadium	38–18	Loss	19,601	9–8
18	Nov 4	Edmonton Eskimos	Commonwealth Stadium	32–26	Loss	43,123	9–9

== Roster ==
2001 Montreal Alouettes final roster
Quarterbacks: 12 Jamie Barnette; 13 Anthony Calvillo; 14 Dan Gonzalez; Running backs: 4 Thomas Haskins; 33 Bruno Heppell; 5 Éric Lapointe; 27 Mike Pringle; Receivers: 88 Kevin Alexander; 86 Ben Cahoon; 82 Jock Climie; 84 Tyree Davis; 3 Sylvain Girard; 16 Pat Woodcock	Offensive linemen: 68 Bryan Chiu C; 57 Scott Flory G; 66 Neal Fort T; 65 Kevin Lefsrud C/G; 53 Uzooma Okeke T; 59 Pierre Vercheval G; Defensive linemen: 78 Adriano Belli DT; 90 Swift Burch DE; 98 Steve Charbonneau DT/DE; 34 Tim Fleiszer DE; 75 Ed Philion DT; 93 Jason Richards DT; 58 R-Kal Truluck DE	Linebackers: 19 John Grace; 7 Tracy Gravely; 47 Stefen Reid; 55 Glen Young; Defensive backs: 30 Reggie Durden; 9 Torey Hunter; 18 Will Loftus; 29 Eric Riddick; 21 Irvin Smith; 23 Mark Washington; 26 James Whitley; 1 Kelly Wiltshire; Special teams: 10 Terry Baker K/P	Injured list: 0 Demeco Archangel WR; 67 Josh Cochran T; 80 Jeremaine Copeland WR; 69 Tito Hannah DE; 54 Chris Hoople LB; 31 Barron Miles DB; 91 Mat Petz DE; 6 Jeremi Rudolph RB; 36 Les Smith DB; 39 Harvey Stables SB; -- Ousmane Tounkara WR; Italics indicate American player

== Playoffs ==
=== East Semi-Final ===
Team	Q1	Q2	Q3	Q4	Total
Montreal Alouettes	8	0	0	4	12
Hamilton Tiger-Cats	7	8	9	0	24

== Awards ==
=== 2001 CFL All-Star Selections ===
- Bryan Chiu – Centre
- Terry Baker – Punter

=== 2001 CFL Eastern All-Star Selections ===
- Bryan chiu – Centre
- Terry baker – Punter
- Mike Pringle – Running Back
