= Ryan Donnelly =

Ryan Donnelly is the name of:

- Ryan Donnelly (Canadian football) (born 1978), guard
- Ryan Donnelly (footballer) (born 1991), Scottish footballer
- Ryan Donnelly (pharmaceutical scientist), pharmaceutical scientist
