= Angus Reid (disambiguation) =

Angus Reid may refer to:

- Angus Reid (born 1976), Canadian Football League (CFL) player
- Angus Reid (market research), Canadian CEO of market research company
- Angus Reid Public Opinion, international public affairs practice
