= Marvin Pope =

Marvin Pope can refer to:

- Marvin Pope (gridiron football) (born 1969), an American player of Canadian football in the CFL
- Marvin H. Pope (1916–1997), an American scholar of Semitic language and culture, including Ugaritic and Hebrew
