= William Fields (Canadian football) =

American gridiron football player and coach (born 1978)

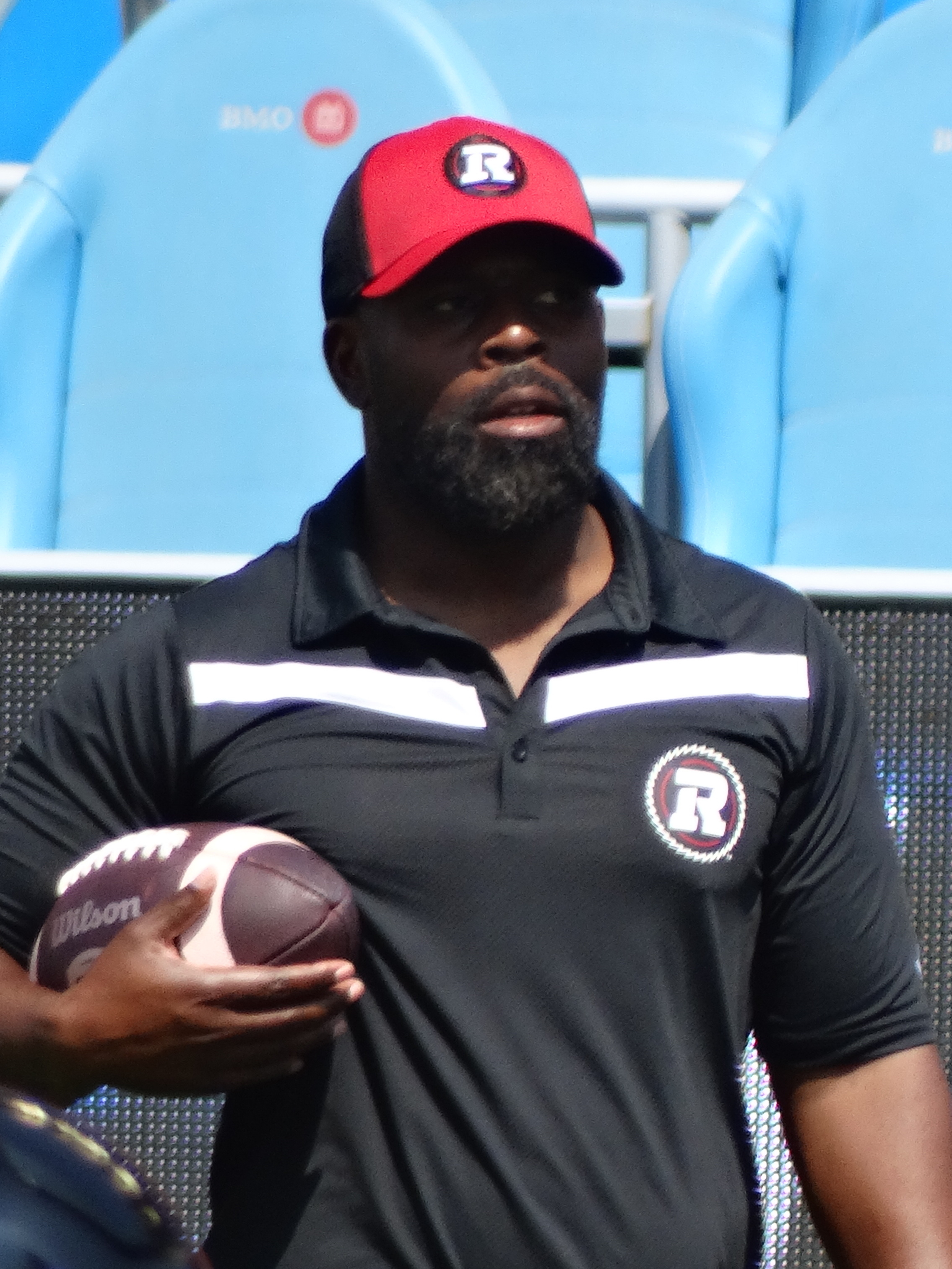
- Fields with the Ottawa Redblacks in 2025

Personal information
- Born: June 21, 1978 (age 48); McKeesport, Pennsylvania, U.S.
- Listed height: 5 ft 8 in (1.73 m)
- Listed weight: 175 lb (79 kg)

Career information
- High school: Copperas Cove High
- College: Houston

Career history

Playing
- 2001–2004: Calgary Stampeders
- 2005–2006: Winnipeg Blue Bombers
- 2007: Arizona Rattlers
- 2008: Georgia Force

Coaching
- 2014: Simon Fraser Clan (Defensive backs coach)
- 2015: BC Lions (Ass. defensive backs coach)
- 2016: Montreal Alouettes (Ass. defensive backs coach)
- 2017: Hamilton Tiger-Cats (Defensive and special teams assistant)
- 2018: Hamilton Tiger-Cats (Defensive backs coach)
- 2019: Edmonton Eskimos (Ass. defensive backs coach)
- 2020: Tampa Bay Vipers (Secondary coach)
- 2020–2021: Peru State College (Defensive coordinator Defensive backs coach)
- 2022–2024: Toronto Argonauts (Secondary coach)
- 2024: Toronto Argonauts (Defensive co-coordinator)
- 2025–2026: Ottawa Redblacks (Defensive coordinator)

Awards and highlights
- 3× Grey Cup champion (2001, 2022, 2024)
- Stats at CFL.ca (archive)

William Fields (born June 21, 1978) is a former professional Canadian football defensive back in the Canadian Football League (CFL) and most recently served as the defensive coordinator for the Ottawa Redblacks. He is a three-time Grey Cup champion, once as a player with the Calgary Stampeders in 2001 and twice as a coach with the Argonauts in 2022 and 2024.

== College career ==
Fields played college football for the Houston Cougars from 1996 to 1999.

== Professional career ==
=== Calgary Stampeders ===
Fields signed with the Calgary Stampeders on May 8, 2001. He played and started in all 18 regular season games where he recorded 41 defensive tackles ad five interceptions. Fields finished his rookie year as a Grey Cup champion as the Stampeders defeated the Winnipeg Blue Bombers 27–19 in the 89th Grey Cup game. He played in three more seasons with the team where he totaled 165 tackles and nine interceptions in 65 regular season games.

=== Winnipeg Blue Bombers ===
Fields signed with the Winnipeg Blue Bombers in March 2005 and played and started in all 18 regular season games where he had 45 defensive tackles and four interceptions. In 2006, he played in four games and made six defensive tackles before being released on August 8, 2006.

=== Arena Football League ===
Fields played for the Arizona Rattlers in 2007 and the Georgia Force in 2008.

== Coaching career ==
After coaching for five years with Cypress Christian School as a defensive backs coach, Fields joined the BC Lions as a scout in 2013. He then coached in the NCAA for the Simon Fraser Clan in 2014 before re-joining the Lions as an assistant defensive backs coach and quality control coach in 2015. On April 13, 2016, Fields joined the Montreal Alouettes as an assistant defensive backs coach and quality control coach and served in that role for one season.

On February 9, 2017, it was announced that Fields had joined the Hamilton Tiger-Cats as a defensive and special teams assistant. In 2018, he was promoted to defensive backs coach with the Tiger-Cats.

Fields was hired by the Edmonton Eskimos for the 2019 season as a defensive assistant, but later resigned on May 9, 2019, to join the Tampa Bay Vipers as the defensive backs coach for their 2020 season. After the Vipers and the XFL ceased operations, Fields was hired by Peru State College to serve as their defensive coordinator and defensive backs coach.

=== Toronto Argonauts ===
On January 19, 2022, it was announced that Fields had joined the Toronto Argonauts as the team's secondary coach. In his first year with the Argonauts, he won his first Grey Cup as a coach as the team defeated the Winnipeg Blue Bombers in the 109th Grey Cup game. On May 1, 2024, it was announced that Fields had been named defensive co-coordinator in addition to retaining his duties as secondary coach. In his first year in this role, he helped the Argonauts to victory in the 111th Grey Cup game.

=== Ottawa Redblacks ===
On January 6, 2025, Fields was named the defensive coordinator for the Ottawa Redblacks. He spent two seasons with the team before being fired on August 1, 2026, after a 0–7 start to the 2026 season.
