= Mitch Fritz =

Canadian ice hockey player (born 1980)

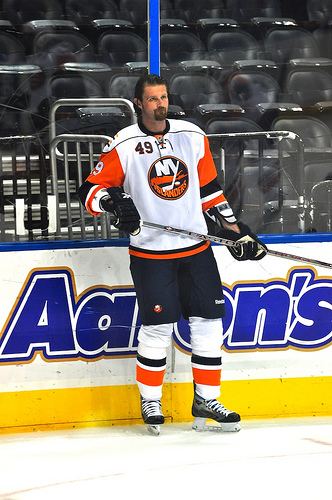
- Born: November 24, 1980 (age 45) Osoyoos, British Columbia, Canada
- Height: 6 ft 8 in (203 cm)
- Weight: 249 lb (113 kg; 17 st 11 lb)
- Position: Left wing
- Shot: Left
- Played for: New York Islanders
- NHL draft: Undrafted
- Playing career: 2000–2011

Mitch Fritz (born November 24, 1980) is a Canadian former professional ice hockey forward who played 20 games in the National Hockey League's 2008–09 season for the New York Islanders. Fritz was born in Osoyoos, British Columbia.

== Playing career ==
Fritz made his NHL debut against the Philadelphia Flyers on October 30, 2008. He is a noted enforcer, regularly accumulating a high amount of penalty minutes and fighting majors each season. In 2005–2006, Fritz was awarded the AHL Man of the Year award for outstanding service in the Springfield community, while playing for the American Hockey League's Springfield Falcons.

On September 30, 2009, Fritz signed a one-year contract as a free agent to return to the Tampa Bay Lightning organization and was assigned to their AHL affiliate, the Norfolk Admirals. During the 2010–11 season, Fritz suffered from a groin injury and shortly retired.

His brother, Luke, played offensive guard for the CFL Montreal Alouettes and Winnipeg Blue Bombers.

== Career statistics ==
			Regular season					Playoffs
Season	Team	League	GP	G	A	Pts	PIM	GP	G	A	Pts	PIM
1998–99	Kelowna Rockets	WHL	52	9	0	9	156	2	0	0	0	0
1999–2000	Kelowna Rockets	WHL	58	4	2	6	204	5	0	0	0	0
2000–01	Tallahassee Tiger Sharks	ECHL	42	5	3	8	79	—	—	—	—	—
2000–01	Lowell Lock Monsters	AHL	5	0	0	0	20	—	—	—	—	—
2001–02	Columbus Cottonmouths	ECHL	45	3	7	10	284	—	—	—	—	—
2001–02	Hamilton Bulldogs	AHL	13	0	0	0	37	—	—	—	—	—
2001–02	Saint John Flames	AHL	11	0	0	0	34	—	—	—	—	—
2002–03	Milwaukee Admirals	AHL	13	1	2	3	33	—	—	—	—	—
2002–03	Columbus Cottonmouths	ECHL	33	2	4	6	144	—	—	—	—	—
2003–04	Columbus Cottonmouths	ECHL	64	3	9	12	149	—	—	—	—	—
2003–04	Worcester IceCats	AHL	4	0	0	0	10	4	0	0	0	4
2004–05	Springfield Falcons	AHL	45	3	1	4	179	—	—	—	—	—
2005–06	Springfield Falcons	AHL	69	6	5	11	212	—	—	—	—	—
2006–07	Springfield Falcons	AHL	63	0	1	1	144	—	—	—	—	—
2007–08	Hartford Wolf Pack	AHL	11	1	4	5	34	2	0	0	0	4
2008–09	Bridgeport Sound Tigers	AHL	36	0	2	2	58	—	—	—	—	—
2008–09	New York Islanders	NHL	20	0	0	0	42	—	—	—	—	—
2009–10	Norfolk Admirals	AHL	73	2	4	6	157	—	—	—	—	—
2010–11	Norfolk Admirals	AHL	11	0	1	1	36	—	—	—	—	—
NHL totals			20	0	0	0	42	—	—	—	—	—
AHL totals			354	13	20	33	954	6	0	0	0	8
ECHL totals			184	13	23	36	656	—	—	—	—	—
