= 2001 Toronto Argonauts season =

CFL team season

- Head coach: Michael "Pinball" Clemons
- Home stadium: SkyDome

Results
- Record: 7–11
- Division place: 4th, East
- Playoffs: did not qualify

The 2001 Toronto Argonauts finished in fourth place in the East Division of the 2001 CFL season with a 7–11 record and failed to qualify for the playoffs.

== Offseason ==
=== CFL draft ===
Rd	Pick	Player	Position	School
1	4	Angus Reid	G	Simon Fraser
4	26	Kevin Eiben	S	Bucknell
5	34	Andre Talbot	WR	Wilfrid Laurier
5	39	Jermaine Romans	DB	Acadia
6	42	Matt McKnight	S	Waterloo

=== Preseason ===
Week	Date	Opponent	Location	Final score	Attendance	Record
A	June 22	Tiger-Cats	SkyDome	L 29 – 16	20,456	0–1
B	June 27	@ Blue Bombers	Canad Inns Stadium	L 38 – 10	23,078	0–2

== Regular season ==
=== Season standings ===
East Division
Pos	Team	Pld	W	L	T	OTL	PF	PA	PD	Pts
1	Winnipeg Blue Bombers (C, Q)	18	14	4	0	0	509	383	+126	28
2	Hamilton Tiger-Cats (Q)	18	11	7	0	0	440	420	+20	22
3	Montreal Alouettes (Q)	18	9	9	0	0	454	419	+35	18
4	Toronto Argonauts	18	7	10	0	1	432	455	−23	15

Source: "CFL.ca". Archived from the original on 2009-06-29.
(C) First round bye; (Q) Qualified for playoffs

=== Regular season ===
Week	Date	Opponent	Location	Final score	Attendance	Record
1	July 4	Alouettes	SkyDome	L 27 – 3	14,065	0–1–0–0
2	July 13	Blue Bombers	SkyDome	L 30 – 16	11,041	0–2–0–0
3	July 20	Tiger-Cats	SkyDome	L 24 – 18	16,252	0–3–0–0
4	July 28	@ Roughriders	Taylor Field	W 50 – 24	27,255	1–3–0–0
5	August 3	@ Stampeders	McMahon Stadium	W 36 – 35	32,605	2–3–0–0
6	August 10	@ Blue Bombers	Canad Inns Stadium	L 36 – 16	25,598	2–4–0–0
7	August 16	@ Alouettes	Molson Stadium	L 40 – 25	19,541	2–5–0–0
8	August 25	Roughriders	SkyDome	L 14 – 11	18,378	2–6–0–0
9	September 3	@ Tiger-Cats	Ivor Wynne Stadium	L 26 – 13	26,283	2–7–0–0
10	September 8	Lions	SkyDome	W 32 – 17	17,462	3–7–0–0
11	September 17 †	@ Alouettes	Molson Stadium	L 24 – 18	19,541	3–8–0–0
12	September 21	@ Eskimos	Commonwealth Stadium	L 23 – 22	28,687	3–9–0–0
13	September 28	Stampeders	SkyDome	W 33 – 31	15,387	4–9–0–0
14	October 6	@ Lions	BC Place Stadium	W 34 – 17	17,822	5–9–0–0
15	October 13	Alouettes	SkyDome	W 51 – 24	17,258	6–9–0–0
16	October 19	Eskimos	SkyDome	L 25 – 22 (OT)	15,438	6–10–0–1
17	October 26	Blue Bombers	SkyDome	W 12 – 7	16,782	7–10–0–1
18	November 3	@ Tiger-Cats	Ivor Wynne Stadium	L 31 – 20	21,019	7–11–0–1

- † Game rescheduled from September 16 due to the September 11 attacks.

== Postseason ==
After finishing last in the East division, the Argonauts failed to qualify for the playoffs.

== Roster ==
2001 Toronto Argonauts final roster
Quarterbacks: 14 Kerwin Bell; 16 Stanley Jackson; 15 Jimmy Kemp; Running backs: 27 Mike Jenkins; 20 Darren Joseph; Receivers: 82 Ted Alford; 83 Tyrone Brown; 81 Andre Kirwan; 87 Derrell Mitchell; 25 Jacquay Nunnally; 85 Grayson Shillingford; 84 Andre Talbot; 86 Nigel Williams	Offensive linemen: 65 Sandy Annunziata G/C; 51 Samir Chahine G; 62 Dwayne Morgan T; 68 Juan Roque T; 58 Earl Scott C; 66 Jude St. John G; Defensive linemen: 89 Leroy Blugh DE; 98 Kelvin Kinney DT; 99 Elfrid Payton DE; 91 Tyrone Rodgers DT; 75 Glen Scrivener DT; Special teams: 4 Dan Giancola K; 1 Noel Prefontaine P/K	Linebackers: 37 Orlando Bowen; 59 Michel Dupuis; 35 Kevin Eiben; 50 Mike O'Shea; 73 Calvin Tiggle; Defensive backs: 2 Donnavan Carter; 3 Brad Elberg; 23 Chuck Levy; 18 Kris Neal; 9 Wayne Shaw; 11 Marcello Simmons; 12 Adrion Smith; 21 Orlondo Steinauer; 19 Rio Wells	Injured list: 10 Antonious Bonner DB; 70 Roger Dunbrack DE; 8 Andrew English SB; 56 Chad Folk C; 69 Chris Gilbert T; 95 Joe Jackson DE; 72 Johnny Scott DT; Italics indicate International player

== Awards and records ==
=== 2001 CFL All-Stars ===
- RB – Michael Jenkins
- DE – Elfrid Payton
- CB – Wayne Shaw

=== Eastern Division All-Star Selections ===
- RB – Michael Jenkins
- SB – Derrell Mitchell
- WR – Ted Alford
- OG – Jude St. John
- DE – Elfrid Payton
- CB – Wayne Shaw
