= Ted Alford =

American gridiron football player (born 1971)

Profile
- Position: Wide receiver

Personal information
- Born: February 2, 1971 (age 55); Columbia, Mississippi
- Listed height: 5 ft 9 in (1.75 m)
- Listed weight: 165 lb (75 kg)

Career information
- High school: Pascagoula HS
- College: Langston

Career history
- 1995: Edmonton Eskimos*
- 1996: BC Lions
- 1997: Winnipeg Blue Bombers
- 1997: Hamilton Tiger-Cats
- 1998: Winnipeg Blue Bombers*
- 1999: Montreal Alouettes*
- 2001: Arkansas Twisters
- 2001: Toronto Argonauts
- 2002: Ottawa Renegades*
- 2002: Toronto Argonauts
- 2003–2004: Arkansas Twisters
- 2004: Calgary Stampeders
- 2005–2006: Arkansas Twisters
- * Offseason or practice squad member only

Ted Alford (born February 2, 1971) is a former professional gridiron football wide receiver. After playing college football at Langston University, he played for seven teams in the Canadian Football League (CFL), including the Edmonton Eskimos, BC Lions, Winnipeg Blue Bombers, Hamilton Tiger-Cats, Montreal Alouettes, Toronto Argonauts, and Calgary Stampeders. In his rookie season with the BC Lions, Alford became a consistent starter and was nominated for the Most Outstanding Rookie award. He spent the next several years moving from team to team, playing in only 8 CFL games from 1997 through 2000.

In 2001, Alford joined the Toronto Argonauts and had his most successful season, recording 1,172 receiving yards and being named an East Division all-star. He signed with the Ottawa Renegades in 2002, but returned to the Argonauts shortly afterward. The Argonauts' signing of Alford without notifying the Renegades sparked a controversy regarding a series of unofficial agreements on the signing of another team's practice squad players. Alford went on to finish the 2002 season with the Argonauts. He finished his final CFL season with the Calgary Stampeders in 2004.

While not playing with a team in the CFL, Alford spent several stints with the Arkansas Twisters of the af2, where he played as a defensive back in addition to his usual position as a receiver.

== Early career ==
Alford played high school football at Pascagoula High School, where he won the 1987 Mississippi Class 5A championship. While Alford played at Pascagoula, he developed with several future NFL players, including cornerback Terrell Buckley, quarterback Shane Matthews, and wide receiver Kez McCorvey.

Alford went on to play college football for the Langston Lions. Alford was designated a first-team National Association of Intercollegiate Athletics All-American in his junior year with a NAIA-high 18 touchdowns on 61 catches for 1,170 receiving yards. A knee injury in the second game of Alford's senior year ended his season prematurely.

== Professional career ==
=== Edmonton Eskimos ===
Alford spent a month with the Edmonton Eskimos at training camp in May 1995. He was released after reinjuring his knee, which required a full season of rehabilitation. The Jacksonville Jaguars of the National Football League invited Alford for a tryout after his knee healed, but he was not offered a contract.

=== BC Lions ===
Alford was signed by the BC Lions and participated at training camp in 1996, but he was cut from the roster in late June. Despite not being offered a spot on the practice squad, Alford remained in Surrey and practiced with the Lions for free. He was signed onto the active roster in late July after the Lions cut receivers Darryl Frazier and Clarence Verdin. Alford made his CFL debut against the Hamilton Tiger-Cats on July 27, 1996. After recording over 200 receiving yards across two games in August, Alford began starting at wide receiver. He finished the season as the second most-productive Lions receiver with 721 receiving yards, leading the team to nominate Alford for the league-wide Most Outstanding Rookie award.

=== Winnipeg Blue Bombers ===
On January 31, 1997, the BC Lions traded Alford to the Winnipeg Blue Bombers for a second-round pick in the 1997 CFL draft. He played in five games with the Blue Bombers and recorded 247 receiving yards on 19 catches. In a 36–21 loss against the Hamilton Tiger-Cats, Alford caught a 65-yard pass, a career-high at the time. He was benched and later moved to the practice squad in early August.

=== Hamilton Tiger-Cats ===
By August 1997, the Tiger-Cats were struggling with several injuries to their receivers. After Ted Long reinjured his groin, the Tiger-Cats signed Alford to their practice squad with the intention of using him to replace Long in the lineup. Alford made his debut with the Tiger-Cats on August 8, 1997 and went on to play three games with the club. In late August, Alford was released from the team.

=== Return to the Blue Bombers ===
Alford was re-signed by the Blue Bombers for the 1998 season. He was cut from the team during training camp.

=== Montreal Alouettes ===
After being cut for the second time by the Blue Bombers, Alford moved back to the United States and worked in a glove factory in Memphis. He expected that his professional football career was over, but he was signed by the Montreal Alouettes in 1999. During training camp, he competed against 11 other receivers for a place on the active roster, with head coach Charlie Taaffe expecting to cut at least five receivers. Alford failed to make the active roster and was released before the start of the regular season.

=== Toronto Argonauts ===
==== 2001 season ====
After leaving the Blue Bombers, Alford joined the Arkansas Twisters of the af2, a developmental league of the Arena Football League. Before leaving the Twisters in 2001, he had 32 catches and 349 receiving yards on the season. Shortly after John Jenkins left his coaching position with the Twisters to become the offensive coordinator of the Toronto Argonauts, Alford was signed by the Argonauts. After impressing head coach Mike Clemons in the preseason, Alford earned a place on the active roster and played in 17 regular season games over the 2001 season.

Alford played a large role during the 2001 season. On August 3, Alford made six catches for 114 yards and a touchdown in a 36–35 upset over the Calgary Stampeders. His performance, which included a 40-yard diving catch, was called "clutch and spectacular" by Toronto Star reporter Mark Harding. After the Argonauts started the season with a record of 3–9, the team won three consecutive games to remain in playoff contention. Alford contributed to the winning streak by catching two touchdown passes, including a career-high 75-yard reception, against the Alouettes in October. The Argonauts lost their following game and were eliminated from playoff consideration.

Alford finished the 2001 season with 1,176 receiving yards and four touchdowns on 75 catches. He was named an East Division all-star and was selected as the league's most underrated player by a Calgary Herald poll of coaches and general managers.

==== Move to Ottawa Renegades and return ====
During the preseason in 2002, Alford injured his knee and required arthroscopic surgery. Prior to returning to the lineup, Alford was released from the team due to new head coach Gary Etcheverry's desire to focus on the running game. He briefly joined the practice squad of the Ottawa Renegades, but later re-signed with the Argonauts to their own practice squad.

Alford's move back to the Argonauts was controversial. By unofficial agreement, practice squad players are usually only signed by other CFL teams onto their active rosters. Additionally, the player's current team is typically given the right of first refusal to activate the player. Renegades general manager Eric Tillman and head coach Joe Paopao criticized Alford and the Argonauts for failing to inform the Renegades of the signing. Paopao stated that Alford was aware of the Renegades' plans to activate him during the week of his eventual departure, but Alford declined to play due to "his legs [feeling] tired". Alford's agent denied that this conversation took place. Initially, the Renegades also claimed Alford took his copy of the team's playbook with him, but the playbook was later retrieved from Alford's hotel in Ottawa.

Alford cited "loyalty and family" as reasons for his desire to return to the Argonauts. He later apologized to general manager Eric Tillman, with Tillman telling the media, "We have a truce. We had a great chat."

==== 2002 season ====
Shortly after returning to the Argonauts, Alford was promoted to the active roster. He played in nine regular season games, missing some time with a hamstring injury. In the final regular season game, Alford caught 10 passes for 111 yards and a touchdown as the Argonauts defeated the Stampeders 33–32 and earned a playoff berth. In the East Final, the Argonauts lost 35–18 against the Alouettes, with Alford scoring a touchdown.

=== Calgary Stampeders ===
Alford returned to the Arkansas Twisters of the af2 developmental league in 2003. He played as both a wide receiver and defensive back with the Twisters. He accumulated 1,730 receiving yards and 27 touchdowns on 127 catches during the 2004 season before leaving the Twisters to join the Calgary Stampeders. After playing in two games, he injured his hamstring and remained off the active roster for the rest of the season.

=== Return to Twisters and retirement ===
Alford returned to the Twisters for the final time in 2005. In the 2006 season, Alford recorded 23.5 tackles and 400 all-purpose yards by mid-May. He remained a key player on the team until he retired before the 2007 season.

=== Season statistics ===
			Receiving					Punt returns					Kick returns					Misc			
Year	Team	GP	Rec	Yds	Avg	Long	TD	PR	Yds	Avg	Long	TD	KR	Yds	Avg	Long	TD	Tkls	PD	FUM	FR
1996	BC	14	47	721	15.3	49	2	28	167	6.0	46	0	3	76	25.3	33	0	2	1	0	1
1997	WPG	5	19	247	13.0	65	0	0	0	0.0	0	0	2	60	30.0	40	0	1	0	1	0
1997	HAM	3	9	112	12.4	18	0	0	0	0.0	0	0	0	0	0.0	0	0	0	0	0	0
2001	TOR	17	75	1,172	15.6	75	4	1	8	8.0	8	0	1	6	6.0	6	0	0	0	0	0
2002	TOR	9	34	322	9.5	35	1	0	0	0.0	0	0	0	0	0.0	0	0	1	0	0	0
2004	CAL	2	7	74	10.6	25	1	0	0	0.0	0	0	0	0	0.0	0	0	0	0	0	0
Total		50	191	2,648	13.9	75	8	29	175	6.0	46	0	6	142	23.7	40	0	4	1	1	1

== Personal life ==
Alford has a daughter with his long-time girlfriend. His family's location in Toronto contributed to Alford's decision to leave the Ottawa Renegades and return to the Argonauts in 2002.
