= Marvin Pope (gridiron football) =

American gridiron football player (born 1969)

York Lions
- Title: Linebackers coach
- CFL status: American

Personal information
- Born: January 18, 1969 (age 57); Gainesville, Florida, U.S.
- Listed height: 6 ft 1 in (1.85 m)
- Listed weight: 240 lb (109 kg)

Career information
- Position: Linebacker (No. 91)
- High school: Eastside (FL)
- College: Central State

Career history

Playing
- 1992–1997: Calgary Stampeders

Coaching
- 2014–2017: Calgary Colts
- 2018: Langley Rams
- 2019–2021: Calgary Dinos
- 2022: Prince George Kodiaks
- 2023: Ottawa Sooners
- 2024–present: York Lions

Awards and highlights
- Grey Cup champion (1992); 2× CFL West All-Star (1993, 1994); 2× NAIA All-American (1989, 1990); 2× Black College Football All-American (1989, 1990)

Marvin Pope (born January 18, 1969) is an American former football linebacker and is the linebackers coach for the York Lions of U Sports football. He played in the Canadian Football League (CFL) for the Calgary Stampeders from 1992 to 1997 where he won a Grey Cup championship in 1992. He played college football for the Central State Marauders.

== Early life ==
Pope attended Eastside High School, where he lettered in football, basketball, wrestling, track and weightlifting. In football, he was a two-way player at fullback and linebacker. As a senior, he received Class AAAA All-state and Florida High School Athlete of the Year honors, after averaging 13 tackles per game. Although he was considered an elite football prospect, he was not offered Division I scholarships because of grades.

As a senior, he won the state Class AAA heavyweight weightlifting champion, including the District 5 meet with a record lift totaling 750, 330 on the clean-and-jerk and 420 on bench press. In wrestling, he was ranked third in the state as a junior and senior.

== College career ==
Pope initially accepted a football scholarship from Division I-AA Western Kentucky University, only to later commit to NAIA Central State University, because of its reputation for developing professional football players.

As a junior in 1990 for the Marauders, he led a defense that dominated in the NAIA playoffs, holding opponents to 13.2 points per game. His 13 tackles, earned him the NAIA Defensive Most Valuable Player trophy in the 38-16 championship win over Colorado-Mesa State University.

He finished his college career with 52 games, 363 tackles. He was named an NAIA All-American and Black College Football All-American in the 1989 and 1990 seasons.

In 2018, he was inducted into the Central State University Athletics Hall of Fame.

== Professional career ==
In May 1992, he signed as a free agent with the Calgary Stampeders of the Canadian Football League. As a rookie, he contributed from his linebacker position to the team winning the Grey Cup. He set a CFL record with 14 tackles against the Edmonton Eskimos.

He played as a linebacker and defensive end. He took part of five consecutive Western Conference Championship games and was a two-time CFL Western All Star.

== Coaching career ==
Pope began his coaching career at Calgary's Springbank Community High School, contributing to the 1999 City Championship title. In 2000, he was hired as an assistant coach at Calgary's Henry Wise Wood Senior High School, contributing to both a City and Provincial Championship titles.

Pope served as guest coach for the Calgary Stampeders in 2010 where he worked with the linebackers. In 2013, he returned to high school coaching at Robert Thirsk High School, contributing to a City Championship.

In 2014, he was named the defensive coordinator for the Calgary Colts in the Canadian Junior Football League (CJFL). In 2018, he was hired as the defensive coordinator for the Langley Rams of the CJFL. Pope joined the Calgary Dinos in 2019 as the defensive line coach and was a member of the 55th Vanier Cup championship team that year. He served in that role through the 2021 season.

On January 18, 2022, it was announced that Pope had joined the expansion Prince George Kodiaks of the CJFL.

In 2024, Pope joined the York Lions as the team's linebackers coach.

== Professional wrestling career ==
Pope became a pro wrestler after his football career. He was trained by Stu Hart and worked for Stampede Wrestling and independent Calgary promotions.

== Personal life ==
Pope's son, Marcellus Pope, played U Sports football for the Calgary Dinos and York Lions.
