= Keon Raymond =

American gridiron football player (born 1982)

No. 2, 11, 25
- Position: Defensive back

Personal information
- Born: November 27, 1982 (age 43); St. Louis, Missouri, U.S.
- Listed height: 5 ft 10 in (1.78 m)
- Listed weight: 206 lb (93 kg)

Career information
- High school: Mehlville
- College: Middle Tennessee State

Career history

Playing
- 2006: Tennessee Titans*
- 2007: Nashville Kats
- 2008: New Orleans VooDoo
- 2008–2015: Calgary Stampeders
- 2016: Toronto Argonauts
- 2016: Hamilton Tiger-Cats
- * Offseason or practice squad member only

Coaching
- 2021: Prince George Kodiaks (HC)

Awards and highlights
- 2× Grey Cup champion (2008, 2014); 2× CFL West All-Star (2011, 2012)
- Stats at CFL.ca
- Stats at ArenaFan.com

Keon Raymond (born November 27, 1982) is an American former professional football defensive back. He played college football at Middle Tennessee State.

== Professional career ==
Raymond was originally signed by the Tennessee Titans of the National Football League as an undrafted free agent in 2006. He then played for the Nashville Kats and New Orleans VooDoo of the Arena Football League in 2007 and 2008, respectively. Raymond signed with the Calgary Stampeders of the Canadian Football League in 2008 and played for eight years with the club where he won two Grey Cup championships, in 2008 and 2014. He then signed with the Toronto Argonauts in 2016, but only played in eight games before getting released on August 24, 2016. He signed with the Hamilton Tiger-Cats in October later that year and played in the last two regular season games and the team's East Semi-Final loss to the Edmonton Eskimos.

== Personal life ==
Raymond attended Mehlville High School in suburban St. Louis. He was the head coach and director of football operations for the Prince George Kodiaks of the Canadian Junior Football League (CJFL). He has also been the President of 7on7 Association of Canada and CEO of K25 Sports Inc.

Raymond and his wife, Bianca, have four children, Keon Jr., Dashaun, Ramael, and Gabrielle. He is a devout Christian and attended Royal Oak Victory Church in Calgary, Alberta, where he resides.
