= Monsignor Paul Dwyer Catholic High School =

Location
- 700 Stevenson Road North; Oshawa, Ontario, L1J 5P5; Canada; 43°54′40″N 78°53′30″W

Information
- Former name: Oshawa Catholic High School (1965) & St. Joseph High School (1962)
- School type: Separate Secondary School
- Motto: Latin: Veritas Bonitas (Truth and Goodness)
- Established: 1962
- School board: Durham Catholic District School Board
- Principal: Shawn O'Hare
- Grades: 9–12
- Enrolment: 940 (2019/2020)
- Language: English
- Colours: Blue and Gold
- Team name: Saints
- Website: pauldwyer.dcdsb.ca

Monsignor Paul Dwyer Catholic High School, commonly referred to as Dwyer, is a Catholic high school in Oshawa, Ontario, Canada within the Durham Catholic District School Board (DCDSB). The school offers curricula for students in grades 9–12 and a wide range of academic and extracurricular activities. The school prides itself on its athletic and art programs, with several alumni becoming athletes.

== History ==
The school was established in September 1962 as St. Joseph High School by the Sisters of St. Joseph, Monsignor Paul Dwyer, and various other Catholic priests in Oshawa. The first Catholic high school in Oshawa, St. Joseph High was established to extend Catholic education from elementary to secondary school.

In September 1965, St. Joseph High School moved to 700 Stevenson Road North, and was renamed Oshawa Catholic High School. In 1976, the school was again renamed to Monsignor Paul Dwyer Catholic High School in memory of Monsignor Paul Dwyer, who gave generously to the Oshawa community and the development of Catholic education in Oshawa. Monsignor Dwyer was close friends with Pope John XXIII, who gifted him his pair of red slippers, which are currently on display in the main office.

In June 2019, part of the school was walled off and sold to Grandview Children's Centre, much like another part of the school within the same corridor several years prior.

== Notable alumni ==
- Ricky Foley, CFL player
- Adam Baboulas, retired CFL player
- Andre Talbot, retired CFL player
- Larry Hopkins, retired NHL player
- Rick St. Croix, retired NHL player
- Mark Mathews, Professional lacrosse player
- Matthew Hughes, Olympic Athlete
- Kathleen Taylor, first woman to chair the board of a major Canadian bank

== Violence and incidents ==
On March 30, 2010, at the school's bus stop, student Michael “Biggie” McDonald, 16, died of a stab wound after a fight with another student. Arrested soon after the incident, which was witnessed by dozens of students at a bus stop, was Dwyer student Jacques “Junior” Amakon. In June 2012 Amakon was sentenced to five years in prison for the killing of the school football player. He was released after serving about 28 months of his 60-month sentence. Upon his release, Amakon was contacted by CityNews Toronto and given the opportunity to comment.

On November 24, 2016, a man in a van pulled up beside a seventeen-year-old student as he was walking to school after lunch, slashed the student with a knife and then drove off. Immediately after the stabbing, staff and students performed a hold and secure, which was soon lifted when police determined the attack was not random. The student survived with minor injuries and was responsive after the attack. Randy Chessman, 21, was later charged with assault, aggravated assault, assault with a weapon, and possession of dangerous weapons.

On September 11, 2018, Dwyer was one of six schools that was placed under hold and secure around 11:00 AM when a suspicious package was found at the intersection of Stevenson and Rossland. The hold and secure was lifted by 12:30 PM. Police did not say what the package was, but stated that there was no concern to public safety.

== Academics ==
Students at the school take a mandatory religion class annually. Students must also take a variety of classes including science, math, English, geography, history, physical education and more, depending on their grade. According to the Fraser Institute in 2016-17, the school received 5.1 out of 10, ranking it the sixth best secondary school in Oshawa, and the 552nd school out of 747 in Ontario.

== Replacement proposal ==
In a report from November 27, 2016, the DCDSB proposed plans for a new high school to replace Paul Dwyer's apparently aging facilities. In a September 25, 2017, report, the DCDSB stated that changing its location was the primary factor behind the proposal to rebuild the school. Approval from the province has not been granted as of June 2019.

== See also ==
- Education in Ontario
- List of secondary schools in Ontario
