= Kathleen Taylor (business executive) =

Canadian business executive (born 1957)

- Born: August 25, 1957 (age 69); Toronto, Ontario, Canada
- Education: University of Toronto; Osgoode Hall Law School; Schulich School of Business
- Occupation: Business executive
- Spouse: Neil Harris
- Children: 3
- Awards: Order of Canada

Kathleen "Katie" Patricia Taylor CM (born August 25, 1957) is a Canadian business executive who is the chancellor of York University. She was the chair of the board of the Royal Bank of Canada (RBC) from 2014 to 2023, and is the first woman to chair the board of a major Canadian bank. Taylor became chair of the board in January 2014, having served on the board since 2001; she previously chaired the human resources and corporate governance committees, and served on the audit and risk committees.

Taylor serves as Chair of Altas Partners, a private equity investment firm, and Chair of Element Fleet Management (TSX:EFN), one of world's largest global fleet management companies, since May 2024. She is vice-chair of Adecco Group, and a director of the Canada Pension Plan Investment Board, and Air Canada. She is also chair of the board of trustees for the Hospital for Sick Children, the immediate past chair and a member of the Board of the SickKids Foundation, and a co-chair of the SickKids Capital Campaign.

Taylor has been a strong proponent for increasing diversity on boards and in business to help companies improve their competitiveness. Taylor is a member of the C.D. Howe Institute’s National Council, Chair of their Human Capital Policy Council and a member of the Task Force on the Digital Economy. She serves on the Dean's Advisory Council of the Schulich School of Business and on the Principal's International Advisory Board at McGill University. She is also a founding member of The Prosperity Project, which is taking action to explicitly link women and prosperity, underscoring the economic importance of gender equality during the COVID-19 recovery.

In 2023, Taylor was appointed the fourteenth chancellor of York University.

== Early life ==
Taylor was born in Toronto, Ontario and grew up in Oshawa, Ontario. She was the second of five children, and graduated from Oshawa Catholic High School (now Monsignor Paul Dwyer Catholic High School) where she served as President of the Student Council in her final year.

Taylor earned a Bachelor of Arts from the University of Toronto, where she was a member of St. Michael's College and the varsity volleyball squad in her freshman year. Taylor went on to earn a Juris Doctor from Osgoode Hall Law School at York University and a Master of Business Administration from the Schulich School of Business at York University.

While at graduate school, Taylor's younger brother died after suffering from bone cancer. He was treated for many years at The Hospital for Sick Children in Toronto, where Taylor has been a volunteer for many years.

== Career ==
After graduation, Taylor joined Goodmans LLP, a Toronto-based full-service law firm, where she practiced corporate securities and competition law. From May 1988 to May 1989, Taylor was seconded by Goodmans to the Ontario Securities Commission where she worked in corporate finance and enforcement.

In the summer of 1989, Taylor joined Four Seasons Hotels and Resorts. She held a number of senior leadership roles during her 24-year career with the company, up to president and chief operating officer (2007) and then president and chief executive officer (2010). In 2013 shareholders removed her as CEO; this was understood to be because the pace of international growth was not as fast as expected.

Taylor has received numerous awards for her business leadership, including the Cornell Hospitality Innovator Award (2012), the Schulich School of Business Award for Outstanding Executive Leadership and the inaugural Medal for Career Achievement from the Hennick Centre for Business and Law at York University. Taylor has been inducted into the Canadian Marketing Hall of Legends and was named to Canada's Most Powerful Women Hall of Fame by the Women's Executive Network (WXN) after being honored by WXN in 2011, 2014, 2016 and 2017. In 2016, Taylor received the Governance Professionals of Canada Peter Dey Governance Achievement Award and was made a Member of the Order of Canada. Report on Business magazine named Taylor among the 50 most powerful people in Canadian Business in 2017. In 2021, Taylor was honored with a Lifetime Achievement Award from the Americas Lodging Investment Summit (ALIS) in recognition of her significant contributions to the hospitality industry.

Taylor has received an Honorary Doctorate of Laws from the University of Toronto, McGill University, York University and Trent University; an Honorary Doctorate of Humane Letters from Mount Saint Vincent University; and an Honorary Doctorate of Divinity from Huron University College.

== Personal life ==
Taylor lives in Toronto with her husband Neil Harris, senior tax counsel at Goodmans LLP. They have three adult children.
