= 2001 CFL draft =

Canadian football draft

2001 CFL Draft

General information
- Sport: Canadian football
- Date: April 26
- Time: 11:00 AM EST

Overview
- 48 total selections in 6 rounds
- League: CFL
- First selection: Scott Schultz, DL; Saskatchewan Roughriders
- Most selections (8): BC Lions; Calgary Stampeders; Montreal Alouettes
- Fewest selections (4): Winnipeg Blue Bombers
- CIAU selections: 26
- NCAA selections: 18

The 2001 CFL draft took place on Thursday, April 26, 2001. 48 players were chosen for Canadian Football League teams from among the eligible CIAU football players from Canadian universities, as well as Canadian players playing in the NCAA and the NAIA. Of the 48 draft selections, 26 players were drafted from Canadian Interuniversity Athletics Union institutions.

== Round one ==
= CFL Division All-Star	= CFL All-Star	= Hall of Famer

Pick #	CFL team	Player	Position	School
1	Saskatchewan Roughriders	Scott Schultz	DL	North Dakota
2	BC Lions (via Toronto)	Ian Williams	LB	Memphis
3	BC Lions (via Winnipeg)	Lyle Green	FB	Toledo
4	Toronto Argonauts (via Hamilton)	Angus Reid	G	Simon Fraser
5	Edmonton Eskimos	Randy Chevrier	DT	McGill
6	Calgary Stampeders	Kamau Peterson	WR	New Hampsphire
7	Montreal Alouettes	Luke Fritz	OL	Eastern Washington
8	BC Lions	Leif Thorsen	G	Montana

== Round two ==
= CFL Division All-Star	= CFL All-Star	= Hall of Famer

Pick #	CFL team	Player	Position	School
9	Saskatchewan Roughriders	Jason French	WR	Murray State
10	Calgary Stampeders (via Toronto)	Lawrence Deck	DB	Fresno State
11	Montreal Alouettes (via BC via Winnipeg)	Pat Woodcock	WR	Syracuse
12	Hamilton Tiger-Cats	Karim Grant	LB	Acadia
13	Edmonton Eskimos	Fabian Burke	CB	Toledo
14	Calgary Stampeders	Duncan O'Mahony	K	British Columbia
15	Montreal Alouettes	Jesse Palmer	QB	Florida
16	BC Lions	Jamie Boreham	K/S	Manitoba

== Round three ==
Pick #	CFL team	Player	Position	School
17	Saskatchewan Roughriders	Teddy Neptune	LB	Ottawa
18	Montreal Alouettes (via Toronto)	Phil Gibson	DL	Toledo
19	Winnipeg Blue Bombers	Ben Wearing	WR	McGill
20	Hamilton Tiger-Cats	Randy Bowles	TE	Simon Fraser
21	Edmonton Eskimos	Glenn Carson	OL	Saskatchewan
22	Calgary Stampeders	Farwan Zubedi	WR	Washington State
23	Calgary Stampeders (via Montreal)	Lukas Shaver	S	Ottawa
24	BC Lions	Scott Robinson	WR	Simon Fraser

== Round four ==
= CFL Division All-Star	= CFL All-Star	= Hall of Famer

Pick #	CFL team	Player	Position	School
25	Montreal Alouettes (via Saskatchewan)	Shawn Gifford	OT	Charleston Southern
26	Toronto Argonauts	Kevin Eiben	S	Bucknell
27	Winnipeg Blue Bombers	Nick Tsatsaronis	RB	Memphis
28	Hamilton Tiger-Cats	Ryan Donnelly	OL	McMaster
29	Montreal Alouettes (via Edmonton)	Peter Moore	DL	Syracuse
30	Calgary Stampeders	Andrew Carter	OL	Bishop's
31	Montreal Alouettes	Steven Maheu	WR/QB	Simon Fraser
32	BC Lions	Kelly Bates	OL	Saskatchewan

== Round five ==
Pick #	CFL team	Player	Position	School
33	Saskatchewan Roughriders	Mike Di Battista	WR	Ottawa
34	Toronto Argonauts	Andre Talbot	WR	Wilfrid Laurier
35	Winnipeg Blue Bombers	Howie Dryden	DB	Manitoba
36	Hamilton Tiger-Cats	Mike Waszczuk	LB	Slippery Rock
37	Edmonton Eskimos	Guillaume Petit	DL	Alberta
38	Calgary Stampeders	Jeffrey Simmer	LB	Regina
39	Toronto Argonauts (via Montreal)	Jermaine Romans	DB	Acadia
40	BC Lions	Dave Tucker	LB	Manitoba

== Round six ==
Pick #	CFL team	Player	Position	School
41	Saskatchewan Roughriders	Jocelyn Frenette	G	Ottawa
42	Toronto Argonauts	Matt McKnight	S	Waterloo
43	Winnipeg Blue Bombers	Darryl Fabiani	DB	Western Ontario
44	Hamilton Tiger-Cats	Will Grant	QB	Acadia
45	Edmonton Eskimos	William Wright	DB	Bishop's
46	Calgary Stampeders	David D'Onofrio	LB	York
47	Montreal Alouettes	Phil Côté	QB	Ottawa
48	BC Lions	Eric Collings	OL	British Columbia
