= Jamie Boreham =

Canadian football player

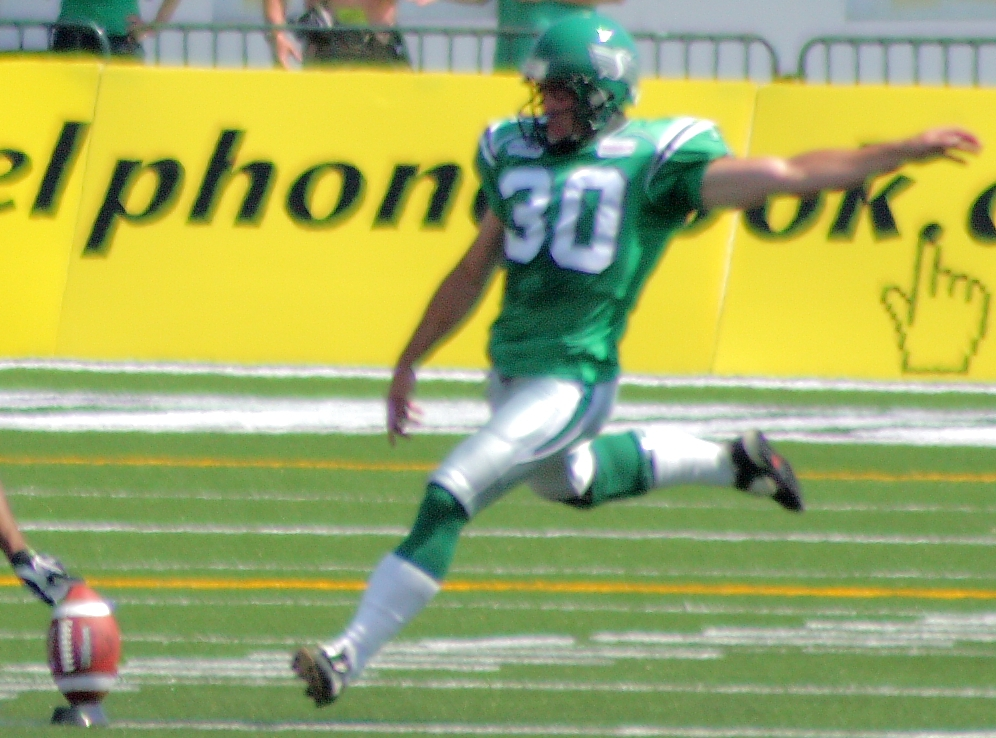
- Boreham kicking off for the Saskatchewan Roughriders in 2007

Profile
- Positions: Punter, Kicker

Personal information
- Born: March 29, 1978 (age 48); Vancouver, British Columbia
- Listed height: 5 ft 10 in (1.78 m)
- Listed weight: 225 lb (102 kg)

Career information
- High school: Vancouver College
- CJFL: Abbotsford Air Force
- University: British Columbia; Saskatchewan; Manitoba
- CFL draft: 2001: 2nd round, 16th overall pick

Career history

Playing
- 2001: BC Lions*
- 2002: Winnipeg Blue Bombers*
- 2003: Winnipeg Blue Bombers*
- 2004–2006: Hamilton Tiger-Cats
- 2007–2009: Saskatchewan Roughriders
- 2010: Toronto Argonauts
- 2011: Edmonton Eskimos*
- 2011: Saskatchewan Roughriders*
- 2011: Winnipeg Blue Bombers
- 2012: Saskatchewan Roughriders*
- * Offseason or practice squad member only

Coaching
- 2017: Okanagan Sun (STC)
- 2019–2021: Okanagan Sun (HC)
- 2023–present: Prince George Kodiaks (HC)

Awards and highlights
- Grey Cup champion (2007)
- Stats at CFL.ca (archive)

Jamie Boreham (born March 29, 1978) is a Canadian former professional football punter and placekicker and is the head coach of the Prince George Kodiaks of the Canadian Junior Football League (CJFL). He played for eight seasons in the Canadian Football League (CFL) and was a member of the 95th Grey Cup championship team with the Saskatchewan Roughriders. He also played for the Hamilton Tiger-Cats, Toronto Argonauts, and Winnipeg Blue Bombers.

He wore uniform number 30 in honour of his grandfather, who also wore #30 for the Vancouver College Fighting Irish.

== High school and university years ==
After playing at Vancouver College, he joined the UBC Thunderbirds of the CIAU for the 1996 season. In 1997, he moved on to play for the Abbotsford Air Force of the Canadian Junior Football League (CJFL) where he was an All-Star at safety. In 1998, he tore his ACL and returned to play the rest of the season three games later. That season, he was awarded the BCFC Defensive Player of the Year. After a successful surgery he returned to play 5 months later in a top level soccer league in Burnaby. Jamie then played in the CIAU for the Saskatchewan Huskies in 1999 before moving back to the CJFL with Abbotsford for a third year in 2000. He was drafted by the BC Lions in the 2001 CFL draft but returned to the CIAU to play for the Manitoba Bisons. With Manitoba in 2001, Boreham was named a CIS All-Canadian at both Free Safety and Punter and helped lead the Bisons to the 37th Vanier Cup where they lost to Saint Mary's Huskies. In 2002, Boreham re-tore his ACL in the second game of the year (4th play of the game) but went on to finish the game and the season without missing a single play. He re-wrote the Manitoba record book by scoring 114 points in 2001 and 97 in 2002. Boreham is one of only a few players that have been recognized as an All Canadian at 3 different positions (Free Safety, Kicker, Punter).

== Professional career ==
Boreham was drafted by his hometown BC Lions with the 16th overall selection in the 2001 CFL draft. He attended training camp with the team in 2001, but was released and returned to play CIAU football. His rights were traded to the Winnipeg Blue Bombers and he attended training camp with the Blue Bombers in 2002 and 2003, but was released before the start of the regular season both times. He then joined for the Hamilton Tiger-Cats and played with the team from 2004 to 2006 as both their punter and placekicker.

In 2007, Boreham was traded to the Saskatchewan Roughriders. The Roughriders went on to win the 95th Grey Cup that year with Boreham as their punter. He played two more years with the team until he was replaced by Louie Sakoda late in the 2009 season.

On May 2, 2010, Boreham was traded to the Toronto Argonauts along with the 2nd and 4th overall picks in the 2010 CFL draft in exchange for the 1st and 8th overall picks in the same draft. He was released by the Argonauts on February 17, 2011. In 2010, Boreham set a CFL record for kickoff average over a season.

On September 7, 2011, Boreham was re-signed by the Roughriders. He was acquired by the Bombers from the Roughriders on October 2, 2011. He played in three regular season games and two post-season games, including the 99th Grey Cup, but was released on December 9, 2011.

On October 25, 2012, Boreham was again signed by Roughriders, after Christopher Milo, the Roughriders punter, had gotten injured two games before.

On November 1, 2012, Boreham, 7 days after re-joining the Roughriders, he tore his ACL for the third time and retired his CFL career.

== Coaching career ==
On December 27, 2018, Boreham was named as head coach of the Okanagan Sun of the CJFL. After two seasons over three years with the Sun, Boreham resigned on March 24, 2022.

On December 14, 2022, it was announced that Boreham had been hired as the head coach of the Prince George Kodiaks.

== Personal life ==
Boreham served as a teacher at Immaculata Regional High School in Kelowna from 2016 to 2017. He is also a coach of the Notre Dame Jugglers in Vancouver.
