= Prince George Kodiaks =

Junior Canadian football team

Logo

General information
- Founded: 2022
- Stadium: Masich Place Stadium
- Headquartered: Prince George, British Columbia
- Colours: Black, gold, and white

Personnel
- Head coach: Jamie Boreham
- President: Craig Briere

League / conference affiliations
- Canadian Junior Football League; British Columbia Football Conference

The Prince George Kodiaks are a Canadian Junior Football League (CJFL) team located in Prince George, British Columbia. The team plays in the British Columbia Football Conference (BCFC) which is part of the CJFL and compete annually for the national title known as the Canadian Bowl.

== History ==
On July 9, 2021, it was announced that the Kodiaks had been granted an expansion team to begin play in the British Columbia Football Conference starting in the 2022 season. Keon Raymond was announced as the team's director of football operations and inaugural head coach. The Kodiaks play their home games at Masich Place Stadium.
