= Kelly Bates =

Canadian football player (born 1975)

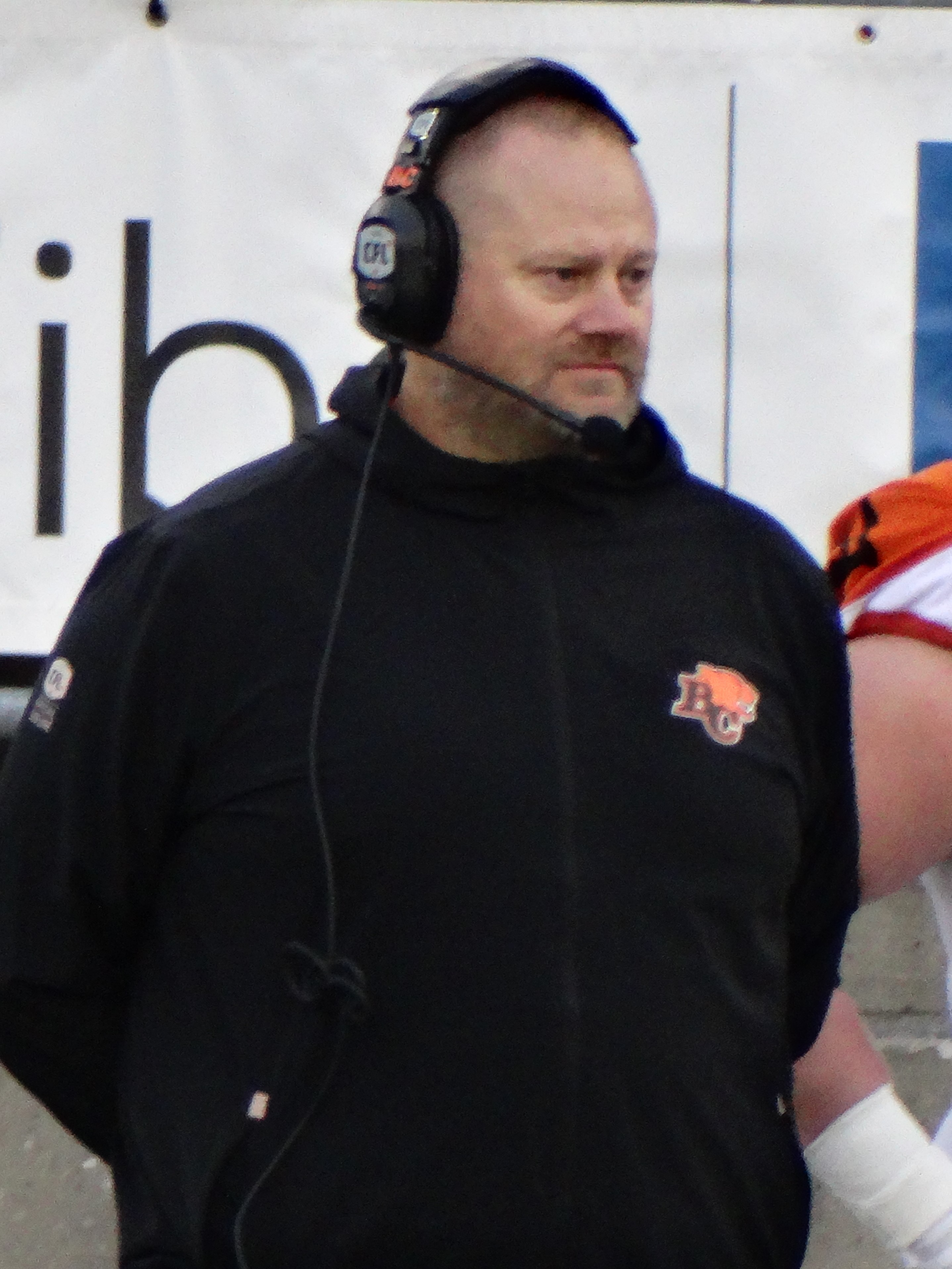
- Bates with the BC Lions in 2022

No. 59
- Position: Offensive guard

Personal information
- Born: July 27, 1975 (age 51); Humboldt, Saskatchewan, Canada
- Listed height: 6 ft 3 in (1.91 m)
- Listed weight: 296 lb (134 kg)

Career information
- University: Saskatchewan
- CFL draft: 2001: 4th round, 32nd overall pick

Career history

Playing
- 2002–2008: BC Lions
- 2009: Winnipeg Blue Bombers
- 2010: Saskatchewan Roughriders*
- 2010: Edmonton Eskimos
- 2011: BC Lions
- * Offseason or practice squad member only

Coaching
- 2011: BC Lions (OLC)
- 2012–2014: BC Lions (RBC)
- 2015–2017: Simon Fraser Clan (HC)
- 2018: Edmonton Eskimos (CQC)
- 2019–2024: BC Lions (OLC)

Operations
- 2012–2014: BC Lions (Draft coord.)

Awards and highlights
- 2× Grey Cup champion (2006, 2011); CFL All-Star (2007); CFL West All-Star (2007); Vanier Cup champion (1998)
- Stats at CFL.ca (archive)

Kelly Bates (born July 27, 1975) is a Canadian former professional football guard and former head coach of the Simon Fraser Clan. He was most recently the offensive line coach for the BC Lions of the Canadian Football League (CFL). He was drafted by the Lions in fourth round of the 2001 CFL draft. He played CIS football for the University of Saskatchewan Huskies.

== College career ==
Bates was a core member of the University of Saskatchewan Huskies offensive line and helped the Huskies win the 1998 Vanier Cup.

== Professional career ==
=== BC Lions ===
Bates was selected by the BC Lions in the 2001 CFL draft (4th round, 32nd overall). In 2004, he missed 7 games to a knee injury and started 11 games. In 2005, Bates started all 18 games including the West Division Championship. In 2006, he again started all 18 regular season games, the western final, and the 94th Grey Cup. Bates was blamed by team-mates for breaking the Grey Cup after BC won it in 2006. He has been a starter on the team since 2003.

=== Winnipeg Blue Bombers ===
Bates was traded to the Winnipeg Blue Bombers on May 14, 2009.

== Coaching career ==
Bates was the running backs coach and Canadian College Draft coordinator for the BC Lions from 2012 to 2014. In 2015, he became the head coach of the Simon Fraser Clan. Bates was fired on November 30, 2017 after going winless through three seasons.

On August 31, 2019, it was announced that Bates had been hired by the BC Lions to serve as the offensive line coach, replacing the fired Bryan Chiu. He served in that capacity through to the 2024 season, but was not retained on the staff in 2025.

== Head coaching record ==
Year	Team	Overall	Conference	Standing	Bowl/playoffs
Simon Fraser Clan (Great Northwest Conference) (2015–2017)
2015	Simon Fraser	0–9	0–6	7th	
2016	Simon Fraser	0–10	0–8	5th	
2017	Simon Fraser	0–10	0–8	5th	
Simon Fraser:		0–29	0–24		
Total:		0–29			
