= Leif Thorsen =

Canadian football player

No. 79 – BC Lions
- Position: Offensive Guard

Personal information
- Born: Courtenay, British Columbia
- Listed height: 6 ft 5 in (1.96 m)
- Listed weight: 295 lb (134 kg)

Career information
- High school: Flathead High School
- College: Montana Grizzlies football
- CFL draft: 2001: 1st round, 8th overall pick

Career history
- 2001: BC Lions

Awards and highlights
- 2-time All-Big Sky Conference honorable mention

Leif Thorsen is a Canadian former offensive guard for the BC Lions of the Canadian Football League (CFL). He was drafted by the Lions in the first round of the 2001 CFL draft. He played college football at the University of Montana.

== Early life and college ==
Thorsen was born in Courtenay, British Columbia and lived there until the fourth grade. He played high school football at Flathead High School in Kalispell, Montana. Thorsen then played college football at the University of Montana where he was a three-year starter at right guard. He became a two-time honorable mention All-Big Sky Conference selection.

== Professional career ==
Thorsen was chosen eighth overall by the BC Lions in the first round of the 2001 CFL draft. He played for the team for one season before retiring from football.
