= Kevin Eiben =

Canadian gridiron football player and coach (born 1979)

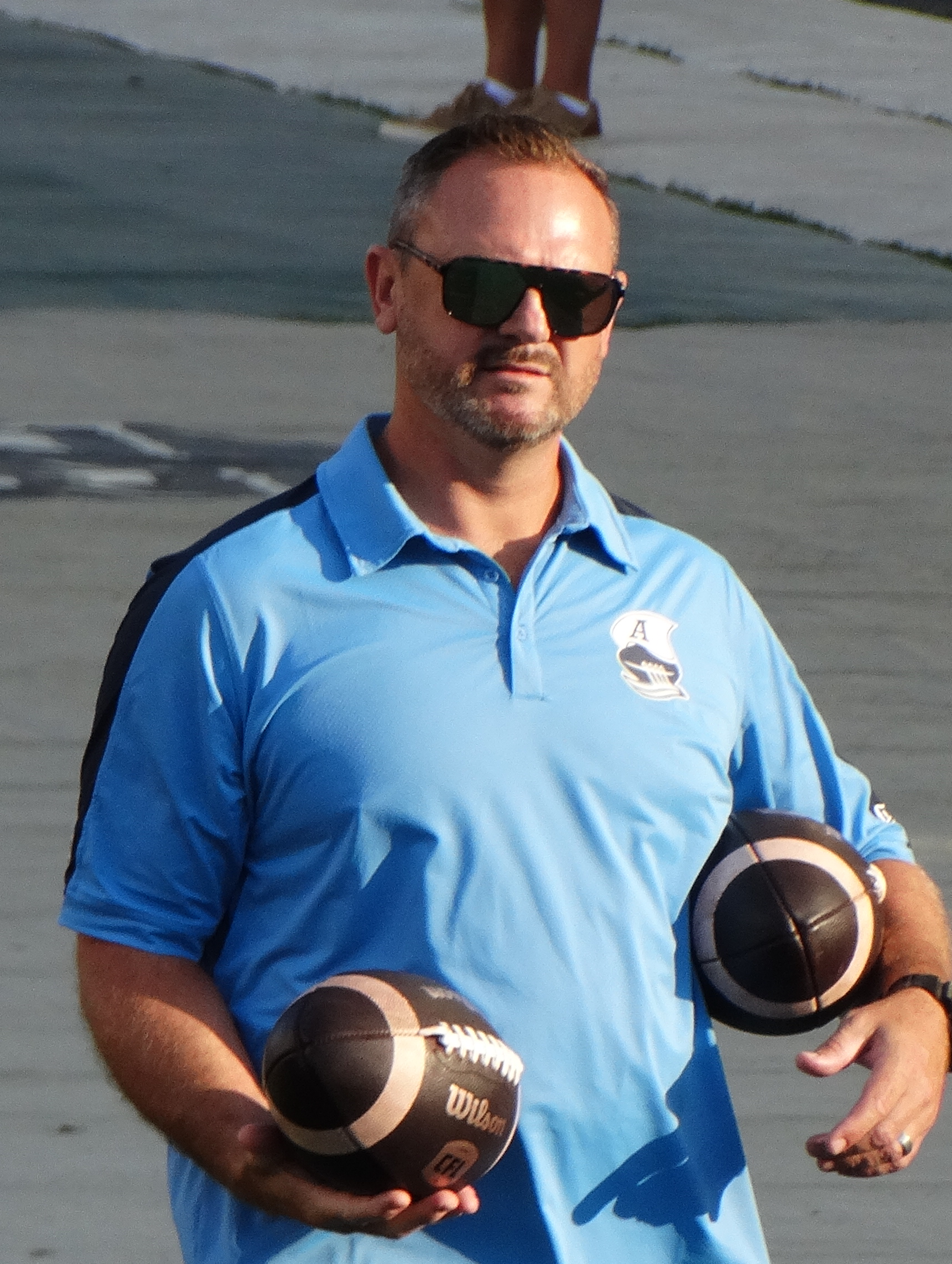
- Eiben with the Toronto Argonauts in 2024

Personal information
- Born: September 28, 1979 (age 47); Delta, British Columbia, Canada
- Listed height: 6 ft 1 in (1.85 m)
- Listed weight: 215 lb (98 kg)

Career information
- Position: Linebacker (No. 35)
- High school: Vancouver College
- College: Bucknell
- CFL draft: 2001: 4th round, 26th overall pick

Career history

Playing
- 2001–2011: Toronto Argonauts
- 2012: Hamilton Tiger-Cats

Coaching
- 2013: McMaster Marauders (DC)
- 2014–2016: Toronto Varsity Blues (DC)
- 2017–2018: Toronto Argonauts (STC)
- 2019–2025: Toronto Argonauts (LB)
- 2024–2025: Toronto Argonauts (DCC)

Awards and highlights
- 4× Grey Cup champion (2004, 2017, 2022, 2024); 2× Lew Hayman Trophy (2004, 2005); 3× CFL All-Star (2004, 2005, 2007); 5× CFL East All-Star (2004, 2005, 2006, 2007, 2010)
- Stats at CFL.ca

Kevin Eiben (born September 28, 1979) is a Canadian former professional football linebacker and coach. He was drafted 26th overall by the Toronto Argonauts of the Canadian Football League (CFL) in the 2001 CFL draft and spent the first 11 years of his playing career with the team, followed by one season with the Hamilton Tiger-Cats. He is a four-time Grey Cup champion after winning with the Argonauts as a player in 2004 and as an assistant coach in 2017, 2022, and 2024. He played college football for the Bucknell Bison.

== Early life ==
Eiben grew up in Delta, British Columbia with parents Laraine and Larry Eiben, and three siblings. He now resides in Mississauga, Ontario. Eiben comes from a football family. His father played strong safety at the University of Cincinnati and his uncle, George, played fullback at the University of Nebraska–Lincoln. His brother, L.J., was a third round draft choice of the Argonauts in the 1996 CFL draft played for the BC Lions.

Eiben attended Vancouver College high school, lettered in football, basketball, and baseball. He was named all-league football player three times, voted Provincial Offensive Most Valuable Player at quarterback in football his final year, and also made 102 tackles at the safety position. In addition, he was named to the all-league in basketball his senior year.

Eiben went on to Bucknell University, where he majored in business management. He was a Dean's List student and member of the Patriot League Academic Honour Roll. In his 4 years playing for the Bucknell Bison football team, Eiben started 33 of 43 games playing at either strong or free safety position. He holds a number of school records, including sharing the single-game interception record of 4. In 1999, he received the Clarke Hinkle Award as the Bison's outstanding linebacker or defensive back. He led the Patriot League in 2000 with eight interceptions and, in 2001, was named an American Football Coaches Association All-American, a second team AP Division I-AA All-American, was a first team All-Patriot League selection, a first team ECAC All-Star, the Patriot League's Scholar-Athlete, and the Bison's MVP. Eiben was inducted into the Bison Hall of Fame in 2012.

After his first year with the Argos, he went to Florida State in the off-season to do his Masters in Sports Management.

== Professional career ==
Eiben was selected by the Toronto Argonauts as the 26th pick in the 2001 CFL draft and spent time on both the practice and active rosters in the 2001 CFL season. In the 2002 CFL season, he led the Argos with 19 special teams tackles and 4 fumble recoveries.

Eiben signing an autograph along the sidelines in 2005.

On February 13, 2003, Eiben became a free agent and re-signed with the Argos on February 20. He played in all 18 games and two playoff games of the 2003 CFL season, primarily on special teams and as a backup linebacker and led the league with 33 special teams tackles. He also achieved his first career quarterback sack and his first career interception.

Eiben was a part of the Grey Cup Championship team in 2004 with the Argos and over his career was a CFL All-Star 3 times and East All-Star 5 times. He currently has the second most tackles (814) in CFL history for a Canadian player behind Mike O'Shea (1320).

He extended his contract with the Argos on February 14, 2009. Eiben was a player representative as a part of the Reebok 'Rediscover' campaign in 2010. He became a free agent on February 15, 2012 and then signed with Hamilton Tiger-Cats on February 18, 2012.

After one season with the Ticats, Eiben announced his retirement via Twitter on March 4, 2013. Eiben retired having played 11 season with the Argonauts and one season with the Tiger-Cats. Throughout his career Eiben amassed 722 Defensive tackles, 92 Special Team tackles, 15 sacks, 10 interceptions and 12 fumble recoveries.

== Coaching career ==
Eiben was the defensive coordinator with the McMaster Marauders for the 2013 season and was the defensive coordinator with the University of Toronto Varsity Blues from 2014 to 2016.

In 2017, Eiben became the special teams coordinator of the Toronto Argonauts. Beginning in 2019, he served as linebackers coach for the Argonauts. On May 1, 2024, it was announced that Eiben had been named defensive co-coordinator in addition to retaining his duties as linebackers coach. He won three Grey Cup championships as an assistant coach during this time, but was not retained on the coaching staff for 2026.

== Business career ==
Eiben was a franchise owner of Sport Specific Training (SST) with a location in Oakville, Ontario from 2009 to 2014 before selling to his business partner who still runs the location.

After retiring from the CFL, Eiben took a position with the Front Office of the Hamilton Tiger-Cats as Manager, Business Development and Corporate Partnerships for the new Tim Hortons Field, home to the PanAm games in 2015 and Hamilton Tiger-Cats starting July 2014 season.
