= Ryan Donnelly (Canadian football) =

Canadian football player (born 1978)

No. 55, 64
- Position: Guard

Personal information
- Born: December 13, 1978 (age 47); St. Catharines, Ontario, Canada
- Listed height: 6 ft 5 in (1.96 m)
- Listed weight: 292 lb (132 kg)

Career information
- High school: Vincent Massey
- University: McMaster
- CFL draft: 2001: 4th round, 28th overall pick

Career history
- 2002–2007: Hamilton Tiger-Cats
- 2008–2009: Winnipeg Blue Bombers

Ryan Donnelly (born December 13, 1978) is a Canadian former professional football guard for the Hamilton Tiger-Cats and Winnipeg Blue Bombers of the Canadian Football League. He was drafted by the Tiger-Cats in the fourth round of the 2001 CFL draft. He played in preseason games for the Tiger-Cats in 2001 and then returned to McMaster for his final season of CIS football. He then returned to the Tiger-Cats in 2002.
