= Jocelyn Frenette =

Canadian football player (born 1976)

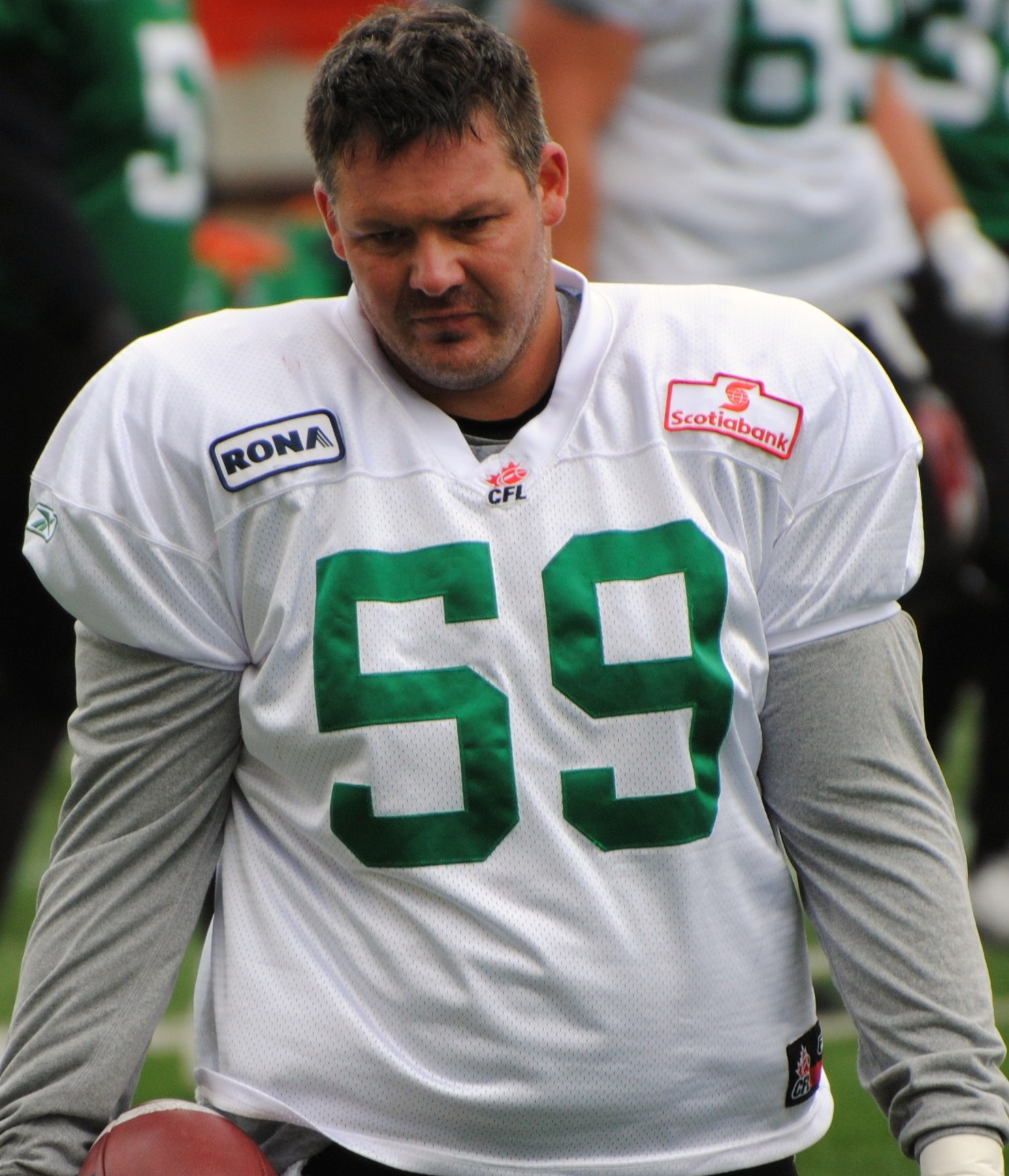
- Frenette with the Saskatchewan Roughriders in 2010

No. 59
- Positions: Long snapper, Offensive lineman

Personal information
- Born: January 11, 1976 (age 50); Montreal, Quebec, Canada
- Listed height: 6 ft 3 in (1.91 m)
- Listed weight: 290 lb (132 kg)

Career information
- University: Ottawa
- CFL draft: 2001: 3rd round, 33rd overall pick

Career history
- 2002–2011: Saskatchewan Roughriders

Awards and highlights
- Grey Cup champion (2007)
- Stats at CFL.ca (archive)

Jocelyn Frenette (born January 11, 1976) is a Canadian former professional football long snapper and offensive linemen for the Saskatchewan Roughriders of the Canadian Football League. He played CIS Football at Ottawa.
