= Lyle Green =

Canadian gridiron football player (born 1976)

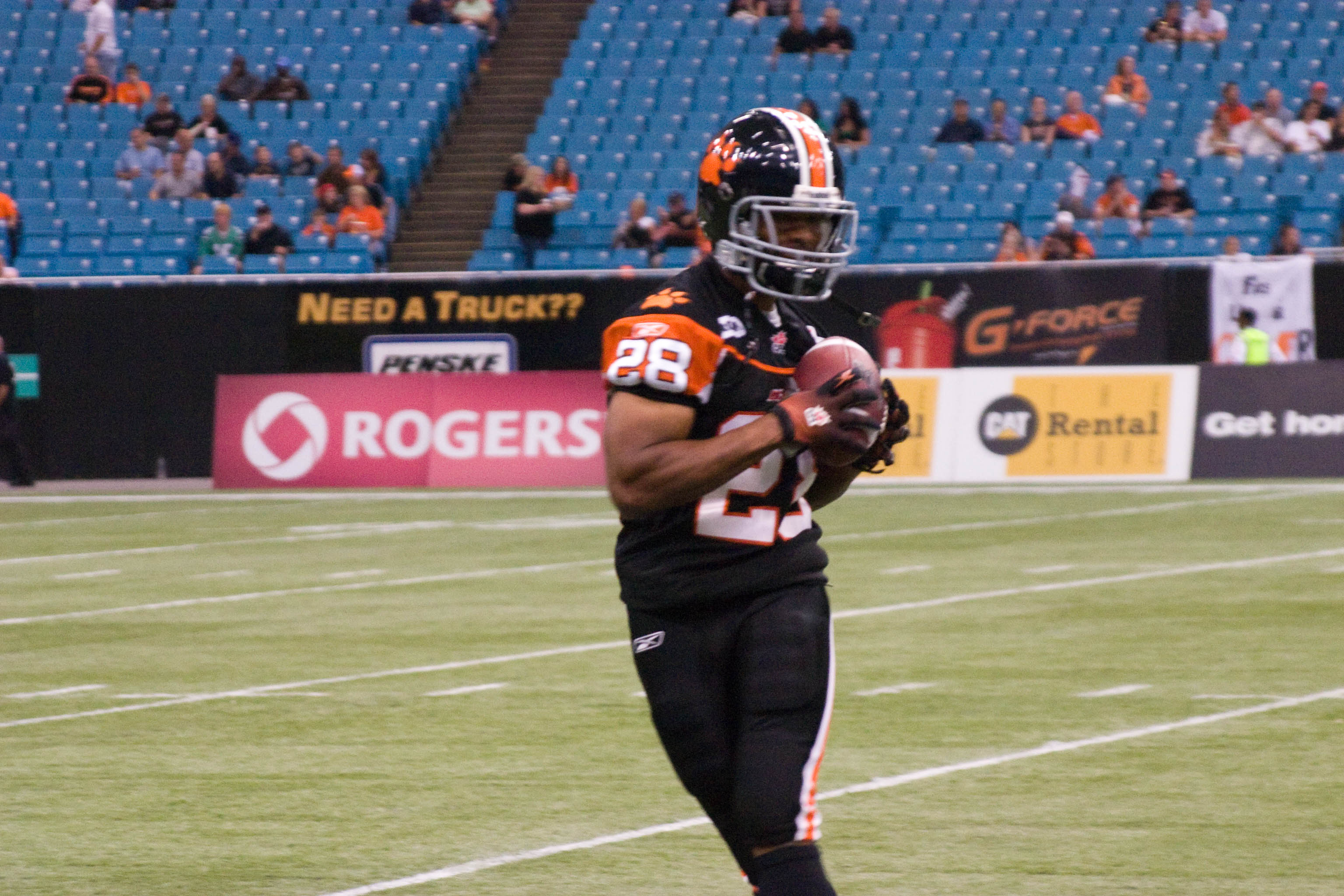
- Green in 2009

No. 28
- Position: Fullback

Personal information
- Born: February 4, 1976 (age 50); Kitchener, Ontario, Canada
- Listed height: 6 ft 1 in (1.85 m)
- Listed weight: 220 lb (100 kg)

Career information
- College: Toledo
- CFL draft: 2001: 1st round, 3rd overall pick

Career history
- 2001–2009: BC Lions
- 2011: Calgary Stampeders

Awards and highlights
- Grey Cup champion (2006)
- Stats at CFL.ca (archive)

Lyle Green (born February 4, 1976, in Kitchener, Ontario) is a former gridiron football fullback. He was a member of the BC Lions and Calgary Stampeders.

Green went to the University of Toledo. With the Lions he is number 28. Green is 6'1" and weighs 217 lbs. He was drafted by the Lions in the 2001 CFL draft (1st round, 3rd overall).

In the 2002 CFL season, Green had career-highs in rushing yards (343, also his only 100+ rushing yard season), touchdowns (3, has only 4 in his career) and carries (60). In the 2004 CFL season, he recorded a career-high in receptions (22) and had 248 receiving yards. In the 2005 CFL season, Green was one of 9 players on BC's offense to start all 18 games. He also had a career-high in receiving yards (261) and recorded the first receiving touchdown of his career.

In 2006, Green had career-lows in rushing yards (31), receiving yards (35) and average yards in receiving (5.8), but did have a career-high in average yards in rushing (15.5) and helped the Lions win the 94th Grey Cup.

On June 8, 2009, Green was officially moved to the slotback position by head coach and general manager Wally Buono. This was partly to fill the void left by Jason Clermont leaving the Lions to play in Saskatchewan and also to let younger players like Rolly Lumbala and Alexis Bwenge have a shot to play in the Lions backfield.

With the emergence of Jamall Lee, Andrew Harris and Jerome Messam as Canadian fullbacks, Green was released on June 24, 2010. Green finished 14th on the all-time list for games played by a BC Lion, with 161 games, which was also the most for a running back with the club.

In July 2011, Green returned to the CFL, signing with the Calgary Stampeders. He made 3 special teams tackles while playing in 13 games.
