= Luke Fritz =

Canadian gridiron football player (born 1978)

No. 61
- Position: Offensive tackle

Personal information
- Born: August 10, 1978 (age 48); Osoyoos, British Columbia, Canada
- Listed height: 6 ft 6 in (1.98 m)
- Listed weight: 300 lb (136 kg)

Career information
- College: Eastern Washington University
- CFL draft: 2001: 1st round, 7th overall pick

Career history
- 2001: Carolina Panthers*
- 2001–2008: Montreal Alouettes
- 2009–2010: Winnipeg Blue Bombers
- * Offseason or practice squad member only

Awards and highlights
- Grey Cup champion (2002)
- Stats at CFL.ca

Luke Fritz (born August 10, 1978) is a Canadian former professional football player who was an offensive tackle in the Canadian Football League (CFL). He was signed by the Carolina Panthers of the National Football League (NFL) as an undrafted free agent in 2001 after being chosen by the Montreal Alouettes in the first round of the 2001 CFL draft. He played college football for the Eastern Washington Eagles. He was a member of the 2002 Alouettes Grey Cup championship team, and also played in the CFL for the Winnipeg Blue Bombers.

His brother Mitch was a hockey player, playing in the ECHL, American Hockey League, and the National Hockey League.
