= 2001 Calgary Stampeders season =

Canadian football team season

- General manager: Wally Buono
- Head coach: Wally Buono
- Home stadium: McMahon Stadium

Results
- Record: 8–10
- Division place: 2nd, West
- Playoffs: Won Grey Cup

Uniform

The 2001 Calgary Stampeders season was the 44th season for the team in the Canadian Football League (CFL) and their 63rd overall. The Stampeders finished in second place in the West Division with an 8–10 record and qualified for the playoffs for the 13th consecutive season, establishing a franchise record. After defeating the BC Lions and Edmonton Eskimos in the West Division playoffs, the team advanced to the 89th Grey Cup. The Stampeders defeated the heavily favoured Winnipeg Blue Bombers to win their fifth Grey Cup championship.

== Offseason ==
=== CFL draft ===
Rd	Pick	Player	Position	School
1	6	Kamau Peterson	WR	New Hampshire
2	10	Lawrence Deck	DB	Fresno State
2	14	Duncan O'Mahony	K	British Columbia
3	22	Farwan Zubedi	WR	Washington State
3	23	Lukas Shaver	S	Ottawa
4	30	Andrew Carter	OL	Bishop's
5	38	Jeffrey Simmer	LB	Regina
6	46	David D'Onofrio	LB	York

== Preseason ==
Week	Date	Opponent	Score	Result	Attendance	Record
A	June 20	vs. Edmonton Eskimos	34–10	Win	29,090	1–0
B	June 26	at BC Lions	35–28	Win	9,273	2–0

== Regular season ==
=== Season standings ===
West Division
Pos	Team	Pld	W	L	T	OTL	PF	PA	PD	Pts
1	Edmonton Eskimos (C, Q)	18	9	8	0	1	439	463	−24	19
2	Calgary Stampeders (Q)	18	8	9	0	1	478	476	+2	17
3	BC Lions (Q)	18	8	10	0	0	417	445	−28	16
4	Saskatchewan Roughriders	18	6	12	0	0	308	416	−108	12

Source: "CFL.ca". Archived from the original on 2009-06-29.
(C) First round bye; (Q) Qualified for playoffs

=== Season schedule ===
Week	Date	Opponent	Score	Result	Attendance	Record
1	July 4	vs. Winnipeg Blue Bombers	48–20	Loss	33,678	0–1
2	July 11	at Montreal Alouettes	32–14	Loss	19,544	0–2
3	July 20	at Edmonton Eskimos	33–23	Loss	33,524	0–3
4	July 27	vs. BC Lions	28–22	Win	32,210	1–3
5	August 3	vs. Toronto Argonauts	36–35	Loss	32,605	1–4
6	August 11	at Saskatchewan Roughriders	35–4	Win	22,438	2–4
7	August 16	vs. Saskatchewan Roughriders	37–13	Win	35,967	3–4
8	August 25	at BC Lions	27–13	Loss	23,642	3–5
9	September 3	vs. Edmonton Eskimos	33–32	Loss	35,967	3–6
10	September 7	at Edmonton Eskimos	34–33	Win	48,279	4–6
11	September 17	vs. Saskatchewan Roughriders	21–14	Win	32,548	5–6
12	September 22	at Hamilton Tiger-Cats	29–26 (OT)	Loss	15,500	5–7
13	September 28	at Toronto Argonauts	33–31	Loss	15,387	5–8
14	October 8	vs. Hamilton Tiger-Cats	35–33	Loss	31,794	5–9
15	October 14	at Saskatchewan Roughriders	29–26	Win	18,496	6–9
16	October 20	vs. Montreal Alouettes	29–9	Win	33,144	7–9
17	October 28	vs. BC Lions	34–16	Loss	27,678	7–10
18	November 2	at Winnipeg Blue Bombers	22–15	Win	27,678	8–10

=== Statistics ===
	Games			Quarterback Passing				
	GD	GS	Record	Cmp	Att	Yds	TD	Int
Marcus Crandell	15	12	6–6	239	386	3,407	14	11
Ben Sankey	18	6	2–4	93	156	1,255	14	4
Pat Barnes	8	0	—	2	3	25	0	0
Kevin Feterik	13	0	—	-	0	-	-	-
	54	18	8–10	334	545	4,687	28	15

== Playoffs ==
Game	Date	Opponent	Score	Result	Attendance
West Semi-Final	November 11	vs. BC Lions	28–19	Win	23,642
West Final	November 18	at Edmonton Eskimos	34–16	Win	42,156
Grey Cup	November 25	Winnipeg Blue Bombers	27–19	Win	65,255

=== Grey Cup ===
Team	Q1	Q2	Q3	Q4	Total
Calgary Stampeders	0	17	0	10	27
Winnipeg Blue Bombers	4	0	8	7	19

== Roster ==
2001 Calgary Stampeders final roster
Quarterbacks: 14 Pat Barnes; 1 Marcus Crandell; 7 Ben Sankey; Running backs: 32 Kelvin Anderson; 4 Scott Deibert; 35 Scott Regimbald; 6 Antonio Warren; Receivers: 89 Marc Boerigter; 87 Aubrey Cummings; 88 Vince Danielsen; 83 Travis Moore; 86 Kamau Peterson; 2 Ibrahim Tounkara	Offensive linemen: 68 Freddie Childress G; 67 Jamie Crysdale C; 54 David Heasman T; 50 Jay McNeil G; 73 David Pol G/T; 58 Tom Rayam T; Defensive linemen: 99 James Cotton DE; 76 Joe Fleming DT; 84 Ray Jacobs DE; 93 Marc Pilon DT/DE; 94 Jeff Traversy DT; 90 Clinton Wayne DT	Linebackers: 39 Willie Fells; 35 Otis Floyd; 51 Alondra Johnson; 33 Kelly Lochbaum; 34 Kent Ring; Defensive backs: 31 Da'Shann Austin; 30 Joe Barnes; 26 Ricky Bell; 36 Lawrence Deck; 29 William Fields; 12 Greg Frers; 9 Aldi Henry; 3 Kelly Malveaux	Special teams: 13 Mark McLoughlin K; 91 Duncan O'Mahony P; Injured list: -- Dan Disley SB; 16 Kevin Feterik QB; 64 Jeff Pilon T; 37 Anthony Prior DB; Suspended: 60 Paul Blenkhorn T; Italics indicate International player

== Awards and records ==
=== 2001 CFL All-Stars ===
- RB – Kelvin Anderson
- WR – Travis Moore
- OG – Jay McNeil
- DT – Joe Fleming
