= Randy Chevrier =

Canadian gridiron football player (born 1976)

No. 95, 91, 66, 56
- Positions: Long snapper, defensive tackle

Personal information
- Born: June 6, 1976 (age 50); Montreal, Quebec, Canada
- Listed height: 6 ft 2 in (1.88 m)
- Listed weight: 270 lb (122 kg)

Career information
- College: Montreal (QC) Vanier College
- University: McGill
- NFL draft: 2001: 7th round, 241st overall pick
- CFL draft: 2001: 1st round, 5th overall pick

Career history
- Jacksonville Jaguars (2001)*; Dallas Cowboys (2001); Cincinnati Bengals (2001); Barcelona Dragons (2002); Edmonton Eskimos (2002–2003); New York Jets (2004)*; Calgary Stampeders (2005–2015); Saskatchewan Roughriders (2016); Calgary Stampeders (2021)
- * Offseason or practice squad member only

Awards and highlights
- 3× Grey Cup champion (2003, 2008, 2014); Tom Pate Memorial Award (2014); J. P. Metras Trophy (2000); All-Canadian (2000)
- Stats at Pro Football Reference
- Stats at CFL.ca

Randy Robert Chevrier (born June 6, 1976) is a Canadian former professional football player who was a long snapper in the Canadian Football League (CFL) and National Football League (NFL). He played for the Edmonton Eskimos, Calgary Stampeders, and Saskatchewan Roughriders of the CFL, and the Dallas Cowboys and Cincinnati Bengals of the NFL. He played university football at McGill University.

He was selected by the Jacksonville Jaguars in the seventh round of the 2001 NFL draft.

== Early life ==
Chevrier began playing Canadian football at 18 years old. In 1993, it was his first season of organized football and was selected to the Midget AAAAII-Star team.

In 1994, he did not play football. In 1995, He played with distinction at CEGEP level for Vanier College. He registered 34 tackles, eight sacks and one interception in 11 games.

== University career ==
Chevrier attended McGill University, where he was a teammate of future NFL player Jean-Philippe Darche. As a freshman in 1996, He started seven games at "rush" end and nose guard, collecting 24 tackles (three for loss), one sack and one fumble recovery.

As a second year student in 1997, he started 7 games at "rush" end, making 27 tackles (two for loss), two sacks and one fumble recovery.

As a third year student in 1998, he was Limited in fall drills after suffering fractured ribs in a car accident. He started in every game at strongside defensive end, registering 30 tackles (3.5 for loss) and one sack.

As a fourth year student in 1999, he played defensive tackle, end and long snapper. He totaled 28 tackles (5 for loss), one sack, one forced fumble and one fumble recovery. He received second-team Canadian Intercollegiate Athletic Union All-Canadian and first-team All-OQIFC honors.

As a fifth year student in 2000, he started eight games at strongside defensive tackle and handled deep snapping duties. He posted 48 tackles (seven for loss), five sacks, two forced fumbles, one pass deflection and one fumble recovery. He became the first player in school history to win the J. P. Metras Trophy for the outstanding lineman in Canadian universities. He also received the Alouette Alumni Trophy for the outstanding player in Quebec football and Unanimous Ontario-Quebec Intercollegiate Football Conference first-team honors.

He was a versatile player that saw time at defensive tackle, defensive end, nose tackle, long snapper and offensive tackle (in short-yardage situations). He finished his college career with 40 games, 157 tackles, 82 solo tackles, 20.5 tackles for loss (school record) and 10 sacks. He took part in the East–West Shrine Game, recovering in six weeks following a stabbing as a bouncer at a bar in which he suffered a punctured lung.

== Professional career ==
=== Jacksonville Jaguars ===
Chevrier was selected by the Jacksonville Jaguars in the seventh round (241st overall) of the 2001 NFL draft to play as a long snapper. He was also selected by the Edmonton Eskimos fifth overall in the 2001 CFL draft. On September 2, 2001, he was waived after being passed on the depth chart by Joe Zelenka.

=== Dallas Cowboys ===
On September 4, 2001, Chevrier was claimed off waivers by the Dallas Cowboys, who were looking to replace long snapper Dale Hellestrae who was released in a salary-cap move. On November 13, he was cut after struggling with his long snapper duties and having an errant snap that led to placekicker Tim Seder being injured. He was replaced with Mike Solwold.

=== Cincinnati Bengals ===
On December 4, 2001, he was signed by the Cincinnati Bengals to the practice squad. On December 7, he was promoted to the active roster after Brad St. Louis re-aggravated his left groin injury.

In 2002, he was allocated to the Barcelona Dragons of NFL Europe, where he appeared in 10 games, while recording seven tackles, one forced fumble and three special teams tackles. On August 26, he was released by the Bengals after not being able to pass St. Louis on the depth chart.

=== Edmonton Eskimos ===
On September 26, 2002, he signed with the Edmonton Eskimos of the Canadian Football League, playing in five games and making four tackles. The next year, he appeared in all 18 regular season games, posting 15 tackles, six special team tackles, three knockdowns and one quarterback sack.

=== New York Jets ===
On March 22, 2004, he was signed as a free agent by the New York Jets. He was released on August 28.

=== Calgary Stampeders (first stint) ===
On January 31, 2005, he signed with the Calgary Stampeders of the Canadian Football League. The next year, he played the whole season wearing a cast on his left hand, while making nine tackles, eight special teams tackles and one quarterback sack.

In 2008, he registered 13 special-teams tackles, one defensive tackle and one pass defensed. The next year, he was converted into an offensive tackle, playing as a reserve and making seven special teams tackles.

In 2010, he posted five special teams tackles, one punt for 53 yards, one fumble recovery and one reception for his second career touchdown. The next year, he had eight special teams tackles.

In 2012, he tallied five special teams. The next year appeared in all 18 regular-season games, made nine special-teams tackles and also played in the Western Final.

In 2014, he became the 23rd player in franchise history to play with the club at least 10 seasons. He also earned the CFL's Tom Pate Memorial Award for outstanding sportsmanship and community contributions. He wasn't re-signed after the 2015 season. During his time with the team he served as an offensive lineman, defensive lineman and fullback.

=== Saskatchewan Roughriders ===
After not signing with a team for much of the 2016 season, Chevrier signed with the Saskatchewan Roughriders on October 21 and played in three games. He was not re-signed after the season.

=== Calgary Stampeders (second stint) ===
On November 18, 2021, it was announced that Chevrier had re-signed with the Stampeders. He had retired in 2017, but was brought back at the end of the 2021 season as depth at long snapper.

== Personal life ==
Before becoming a pro-footballer, Chevrier spent some time working in various downtown Montreal nightclubs. This included occasional stints as a busboy at Metropolis where his older brother was a manager. In 2000, while working as a bouncer, he was stabbed in the side of his chest, with the knife narrowly missing his lung.

In 1999, he received an invitation to compete on Canada's national bobsled team. He hosted a radio show on Fan 960 called the “Chevy and Nasty show” with former Stampeders teammate Sheldon Napastuk.
