= Jason French =

Canadian football player (born 1978)

Profile
- Position: Wide receiver

Personal information
- Born: April 7, 1978 (age 48); Montreal, Quebec, Canada
- Listed height: 6 ft 1 in (1.85 m)
- Listed weight: 200 lb (91 kg)

Career information
- College: Murray State Racers
- CFL draft: 2001: 2nd round, 9th overall pick

Career history

Playing
- 2001–2006: Saskatchewan Roughriders
- 2007–2008: Hamilton Tiger-Cats

Coaching
- 2009–2011: Georgia State; Assistant linebackers coach
- 2012: Georgia State; Inside linebackers coach
- Stats at CFL.ca

Jason French (born April 7, 1978) is a Canadian former professional football slotback. He was drafted by the Saskatchewan Roughriders in the second round of the 2001 CFL draft. He played college football for the Murray State Racers.

== College career ==
French attended Murray State University for two years after transferring from Middle Georgia College. French was Murray State's third leading receiver. He had 31 catches for 547 yards and three touchdowns. During his senior season, he caught 24 passes for 195 yards with a touchdown, making him the Racers' fourth leading receiver.

== Professional career ==
=== Saskatchewan Roughriders ===
French was drafted by the Saskatchewan Roughriders in the 2001 CFL draft. During his rookie season, he caught 12 passes for 197 yards. As a second year player, French was one of 13 wide receivers trying to make the Roughriders final roster. He played in 15 games in 2002 and recorded 16 receptions for 218 yards. French played in every game for Hamilton in 2003 and recorded his first career touchdown. For the season he had 37 catches for 385 yards with two touchdown. In 2004, French made a total of 13 starts with 10 coming at slotback and the other three at wide receiver. In week seven he had a career-high with six receptions for 129 yards. Overall, French had 52 catches for 869 yards with four touchdowns. At the end of the season, French was nominated for the CFL's Top Canadian Award. French started 16 games and missed the other two due to injury. Arguably his best game came in week five when he had 11 catches for 118 yards with a touchdown. For the season he had 52 receptions for 601 yards and three touchdowns. In 2006, he started half of the Roughriders games and also played in both playoff games. French's season totals were almost cut in half with 28 catches for 335 yards and a touchdown.

=== Hamilton Tiger-Cats ===
On June 24, 2007, French along with Thyron Anderson for Tad Kornegay. On August 13, 2007 in a game against the Edmonton Eskimos, fellow Murray State graduate Andrew Nowacki caught his first career touchdown pass. On Hamilton's possession following Nowacki's score, French caught a touchdown. The two touchdown catches for Nowacki and French came one minute apart. For 2007, a season in which French split time between Saskatchewan and Hamilton, he recorded 34 receptions for 417 yards and tied his career high with four touchdowns. In 2008, his final professional season he failed to record an offensive stat.

== Personal ==
During the offseason, French lived with his wife Amber in Atlanta, Georgia.
