= Andre Talbot =

Canadian football player (born 1978)

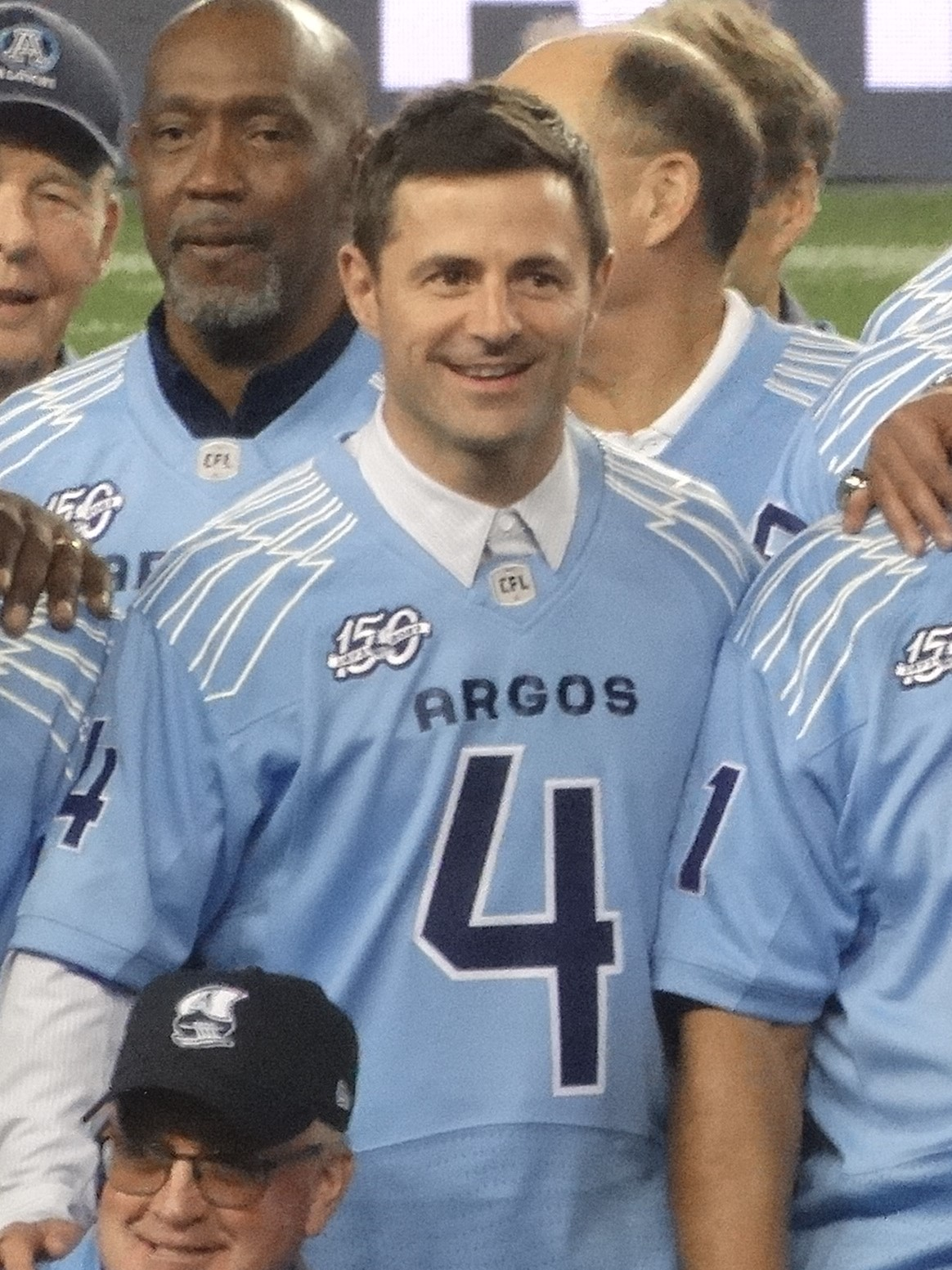
- Talbot in 2023

Profile
- Positions: Wide receiver, Slotback

Personal information
- Born: May 3, 1978 (age 48); Toronto, Ontario, Canada
- Listed height: 5 ft 10 in (1.78 m)
- Listed weight: 186 lb (84 kg)

Career information
- High school: Monsignor Paul Dwyer
- College: Wilfrid Laurier
- CFL draft: 2001: 5th round, 34th overall pick

Career history
- 2001–2009: Toronto Argonauts
- 2010: Edmonton Eskimos

Awards and highlights
- Grey Cup champion (2004)
- Stats at CFL.ca

Andre Talbot (born May 3, 1978) is a former professional wide receiver and slotback who played gridiron football in the Canadian Football League. Talbot played his first nine seasons in the CFL with the Toronto Argonauts and his tenth season with the Edmonton Eskimos.

== Football career ==
Talbot played high school football at Monsignor Paul Dwyer Catholic High School in Oshawa. He later played university football at Wilfrid Laurier University where he was a two time All-Canadian and was drafted by the Toronto Argonauts in 2001. On February 10, 2010, Talbot was traded from the Argonauts to the Eskimos along with receiver Brad Smith in exchange for defensive tackle Eric Taylor.

On March 31, 2011, Talbot announced his retirement from the CFL.

== Personal life ==
Talbot was born in Toronto, Ontario. When he was five years old, his family moved to Woodstock, Ontario. Seven years later, Talbot's family moved to Oshawa, Ontario. Talbot also performed as lead singer for a rock band called "The Street Fever".

After his retirement from football, Talbot became a yoga instructor and is currently a co-owner of a yoga studio in Toronto called "Spirit Loft".
