= Ryan Donnelly (pharmaceutical scientist) =

Irish pharmaceutical scientist

- Education: Queen's University Belfast
- Scientific career
- Workplaces: Queen's University Belfast
- Thesis: Bioadhesive drug delivery systems for photodynamic therapy of vulval intraepithelial neoplasia (2003)
- Website: Professor Ryan Donnelly

Ryan Francis Donnelly has been a Chair of Pharmaceutical Technology at Queen's University Belfast since 2013. His research focused on the design and physicochemical characterisation of advanced polymeric drug delivery systems for transdermal and topical applications.

He graduated with a first-class degree in pharmacy from Queen's University Belfast in 1999, where he subsequently completed his PhD in pharmaceutics in 2003.

He has an h-index of 78.
