= Angus Reid =

Canadian football player (born 1976)

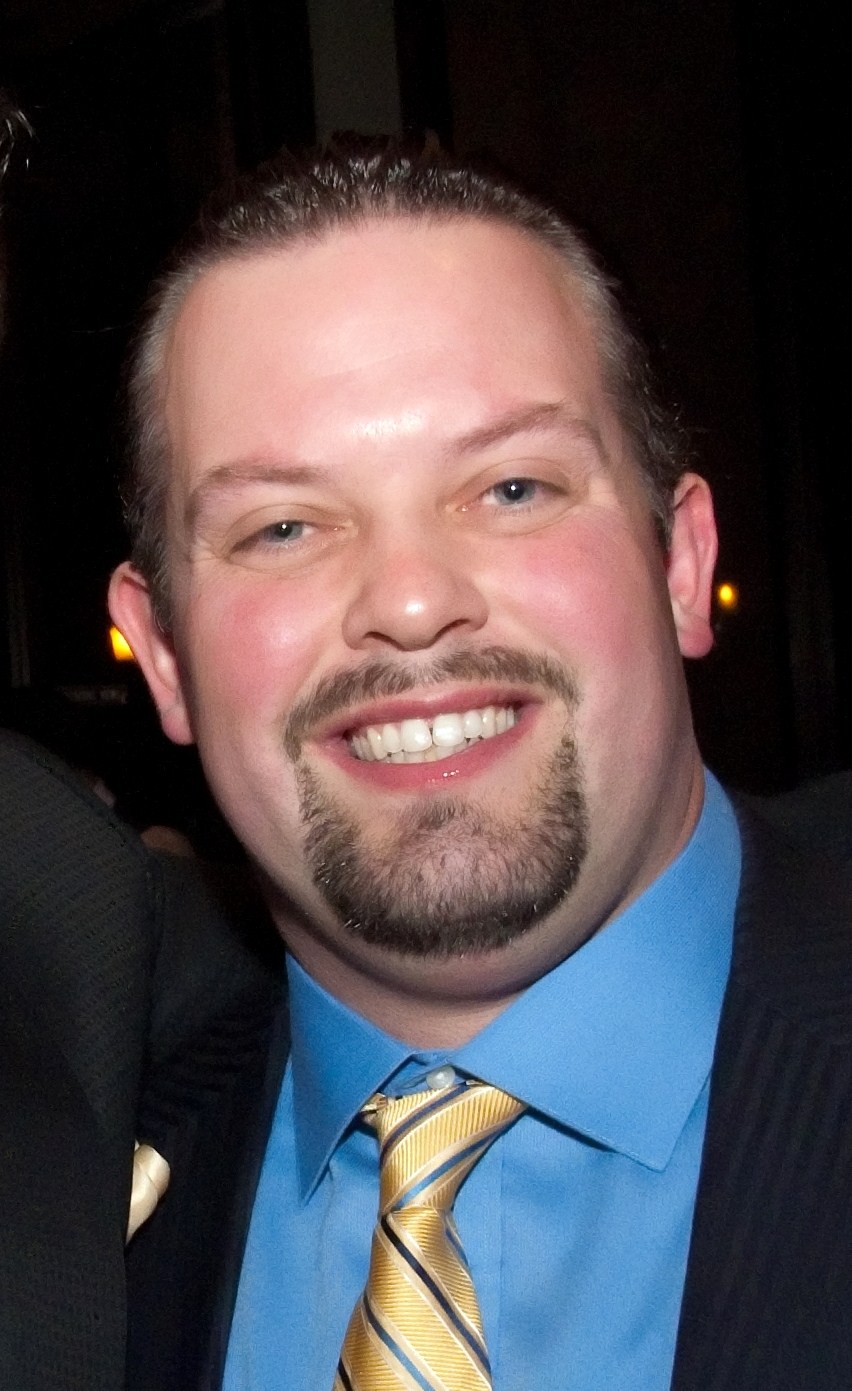
- Reid at the Orange Helmet Awards Dinner, 2009

No. 64
- Position: Centre

Personal information
- Born: September 23, 1976 (age 50); Richmond, British Columbia, Canada
- Listed height: 5 ft 13 in (1.85 m)
- Listed weight: 305 lb (138 kg)

Career information
- High school: Vancouver College
- College: Simon Fraser Clan
- CFL draft: 2001: 1st round, 4th overall pick

Career history
- 2001: Toronto Argonauts*
- 2001: Montreal Alouettes
- 2001–2013: BC Lions
- * Offseason or practice squad member only

Awards and highlights
- 2× Grey Cup champion (2006, 2011); CFL All-Star (2011); 3× CFL West All-Star (2004, 2011, 2012)
- Stats at CFL.ca (archive)

Angus Reid (born September 23, 1976) is a former offensive lineman who played in the Canadian Football League. Reid went to Simon Fraser University and played for the Simon Fraser Clan. He began his career with the Montreal Alouettes but was traded, along with a 5th round draft pick, to BC for Adriano Belli. In 2004, Reid was selected to the West Division All-Star Team for the first time in his career. He was also named CFL lineman of the week for week #7. In 2005, Reid started all 18 games including the West Division Final against the Edmonton Eskimos.

Reid missed three years of college football at Simon Fraser because of gastrointestinal problems linked to Crohn's disease but he played every CFL game from the 2002 to 2008 CFL seasons including the 92nd and 94th Grey Cups.

In 1999 he played for the German team Hamburg Blue Devils.

He announced his retirement from football on March 7, 2014.
