= List of Saskatchewan Roughriders starting quarterbacks =

The following is an incomplete list of starting quarterbacks for the Saskatchewan Roughriders of the Canadian Football League that have started a regular season game for the team. This list includes postseason appearances since 1994, but does not include preseason games. They are listed in order of most starts with any tiebreaker being the date of each player's first start at quarterback for the Roughriders.

== Season-by-season ==
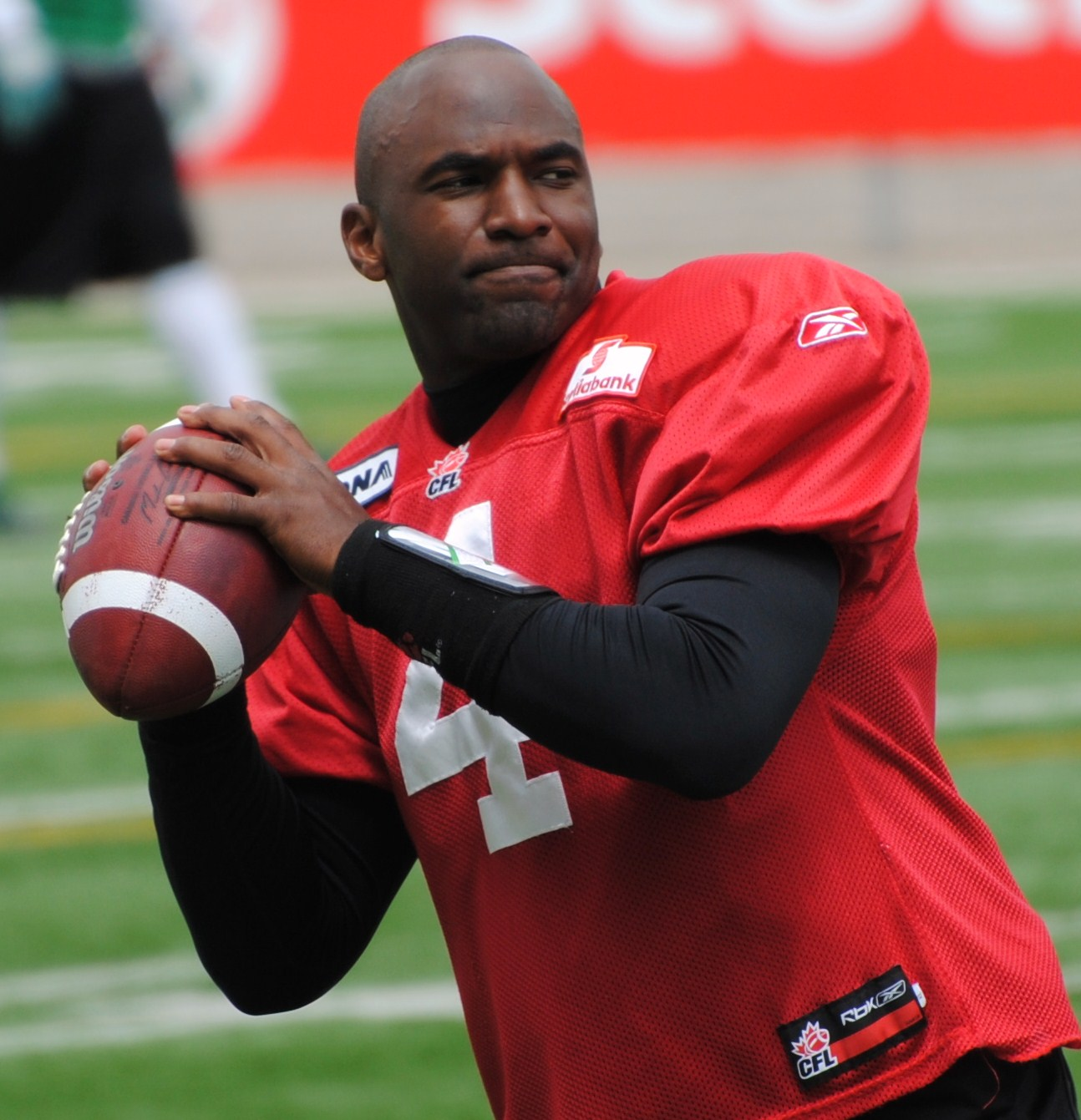
Darian Durant is the only quarterback to win two Grey Cups with the Roughriders.

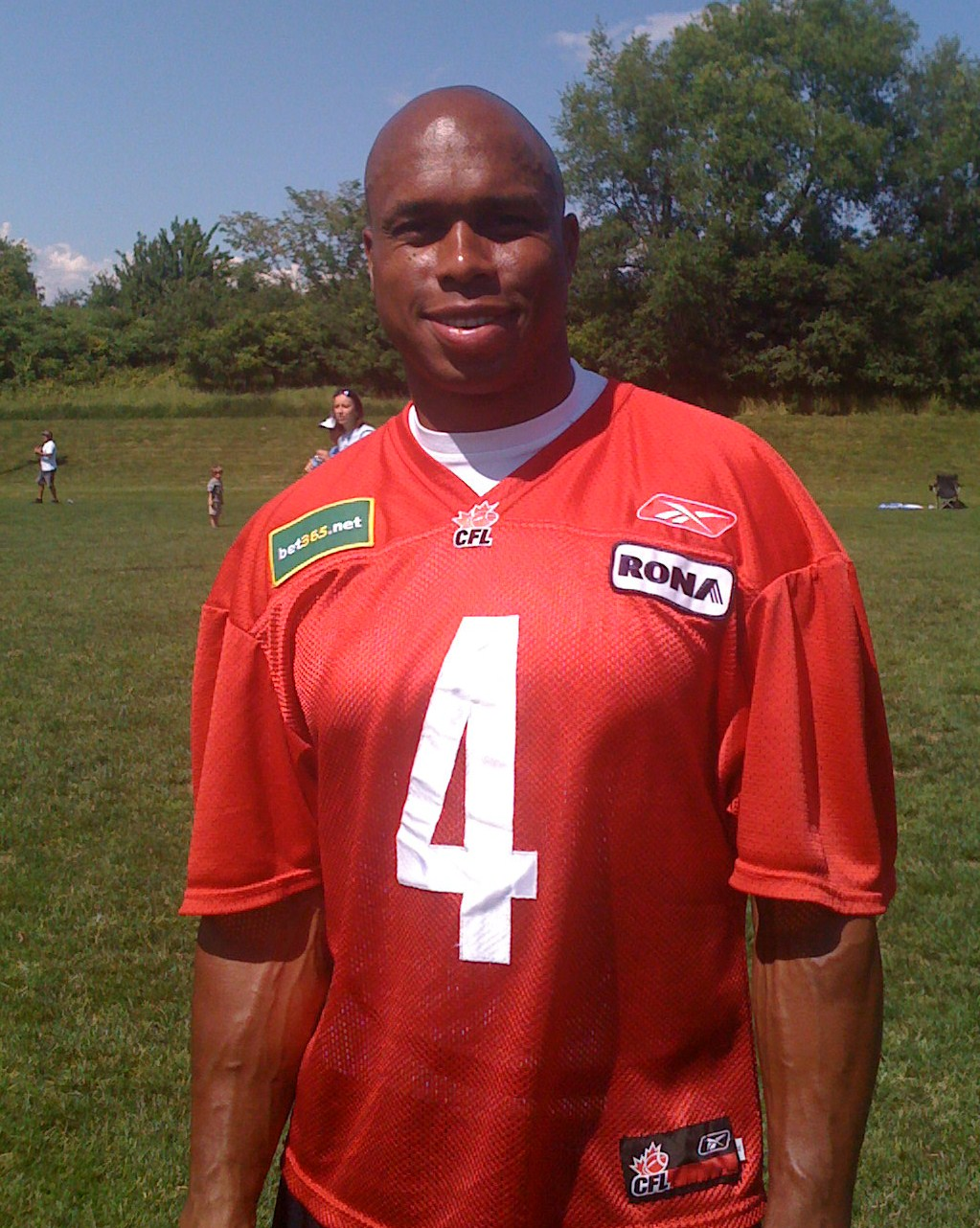
Kerry Joseph is the most recent player to win the MOP Award as a Roughrider.

Where known, the number of games they started during the season is listed to the right:

Season(s)	Regular season	Postseason
2026	Trevor Harris (17) / Jack Coan (1)	Trevor Harris (1)
2025	Trevor Harris (16) / Jake Maier (2)	Trevor Harris (2)
2024	Trevor Harris (11) / Shea Patterson (7)	Trevor Harris (2)
2023	Jake Dolegala (9) / Trevor Harris (5) / Mason Fine (4)	
2022	Cody Fajardo (15) / Jake Dolegala (1) / Mason Fine (2)	
2021	Cody Fajardo (13) / Isaac Harker (1)	Cody Fajardo (2)
2020	Season cancelled due to COVID-19 pandemic	
2019	Cody Fajardo (16) / Zach Collaros (1) / Isaac Harker (1)	Cody Fajardo (1)
2018	Zach Collaros (14) / Brandon Bridge (4)	Brandon Bridge (1)
2017	Kevin Glenn (17) / Brandon Bridge (1)	Kevin Glenn (1)
2016	Darian Durant (15) / Mitchell Gale (3)	
2015	Kevin Glenn (8) / Brett Smith (8) / Darian Durant (1) / Keith Price (1)	
2014	Darian Durant (10) / Tino Sunseri (4) / Kerry Joseph (3) / Seth Doege (1)	Kerry Joseph (1)
2013	Darian Durant (16) / Drew Willy (2)	Darian Durant (3)
2012	Darian Durant (16) / Drew Willy (2)	Darian Durant (1)
2011	Darian Durant (15) / Ryan Dinwiddie (3)	
2010	Darian Durant (18)	Darian Durant (3)
2009	Darian Durant (18)	Darian Durant (2)
2008	Michael Bishop (8) / Marcus Crandell (5) / Darian Durant (4) / Steven Jyles (1)	Michael Bishop (1)
2007	Kerry Joseph (17) / Marcus Crandell (1)	Kerry Joseph (3)
2006	Kerry Joseph (14) / Marcus Crandell (2) / Ian Butler (2)	Kerry Joseph (2)
2005	Nealon Greene (10) / Marcus Crandell (8)	Marcus Crandell (1)
2004	Henry Burris (16) / Nealon Greene (1) / Ian Butler (1)	Henry Burris (2)
2003	Nealon Greene (16) / Kevin Glenn (2)	Nealon Greene (2)
2002	Nealon Greene (14) / Kevin Glenn (3) / Ian Butler (1)	Nealon Greene (1)
2001	Marvin Graves (7) / Kevin Glenn (6) / Keith Smith (5)	
2000	Henry Burris (16) / Marvin Graves (2)	
1999	Reggie Slack (9) / Steve Sarkisian (9)	
1998	Reggie Slack (16) / Steve Sarkisian (1) / Heath Rylance (1)	
1997	Reggie Slack (13) / Kevin Mason (5)	Reggie Slack (3)
1996	Warren Jones (8) / Jimmy Kemp (5) / Kevin Mason (4) / Heath Rylance (1)	
1995	Warren Jones (13) / Tom Burgess (5)	
1994	Tom Burgess (14) / Warren Jones (4)	Tom Burgess (1)
1993	Kent Austin (17) / Warren Jones (1)	Kent Austin (1)
1992	Kent Austin (18)	Kent Austin (1)
1991	Kent Austin (13) / Rick Worman (2)	
1990	Kent Austin (16) / Jeff Bentrim (2)	Kent Austin (1)
1989	Kent Austin (9) / Tom Burgess (9)	Kent Austin (3)
1988	Kent Austin (9) / Tom Burgess (9)	Tom Burgess (1)
1987	Tom Burgess (7) / Jeff Bentrim (6) / Kent Austin (5)	
1986	Joe Paopao (14) / Bernard Quarles (4)	

- * - Indicates that the number of starts is not known for that year for each quarterback

== Team passer rankings ==
Quarterbacks are listed by number of starts for the Saskatchewan Roughriders.

Name	GS	W–L–T	Comp	Att	Pct	Yards	TD	Int
Ron Lancaster	240	147–86–7	3,186	5,834	54.6	46,170	299	358
Darian Durant	113	58–54–1	2,226	3,584	62.1	28,507	149	99
Kent Austin	85	45–40–0	1,964	3,413	57.5	26,626	152	134
Frank Tripucka	82	38–39–5	1,011	1,785	56.6	14,387	83	122
Trevor Harris	49	30–19–0	1,143	1,602	71.3	14,457	82	39
Tom Burgess	46	20–26–0	827	1,634	50.6	11,850	74	74
Cody Fajardo	44	27–17–0	901	1,278	70.5	10,632	48	32
Nealon Greene	41	20–21–0	675	1,126	59.9	7,968	40	26
Joe Paopao	40	13–25–2	737	1,263	58.4	9,337	34	63
Reggie Slack	38	12–26–0	585	1,015	57.6	7,754	36	37
