= List of Edmonton Elks starting quarterbacks =

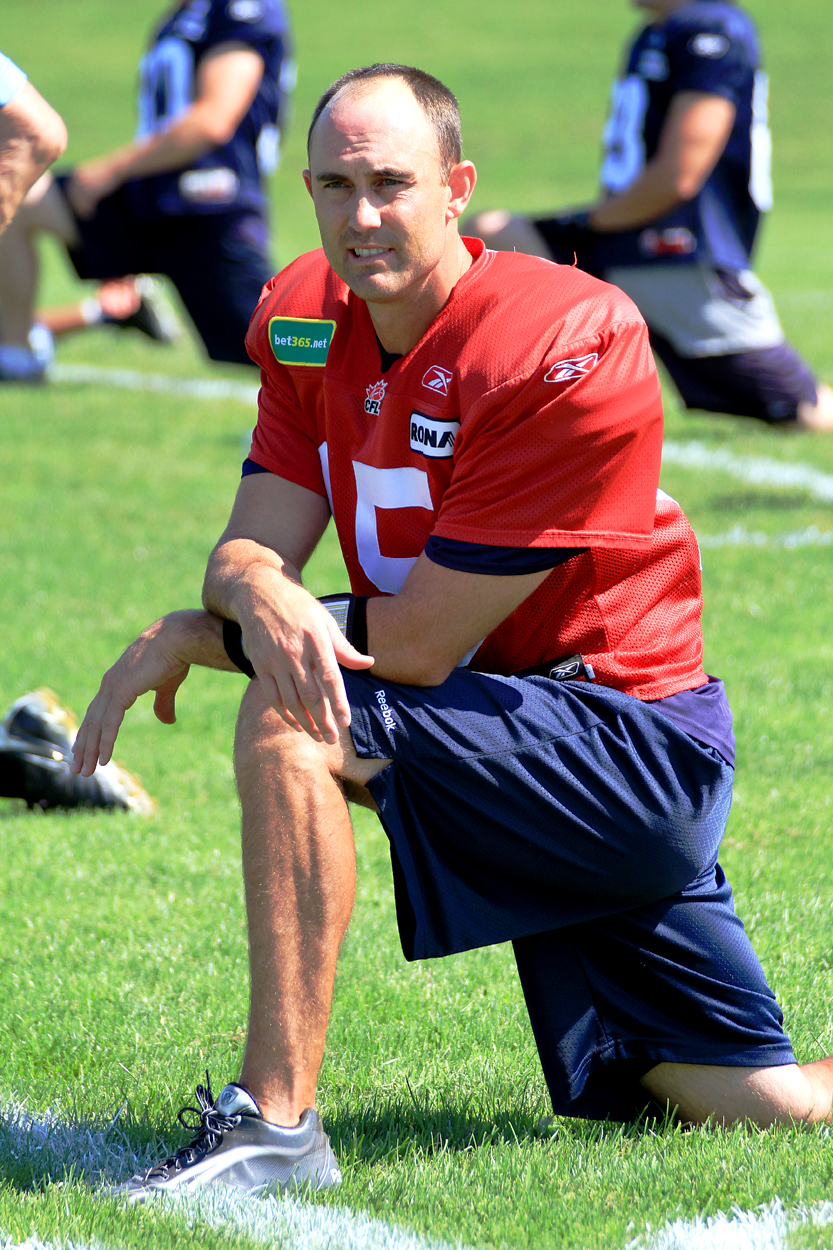
Ricky Ray is the Elks' all-time leader in passing yards, completions, and touchdowns.

The following is an incomplete list of starting quarterbacks that have started a regular season or post-season game for the Edmonton Elks of the Canadian Football League (CFL). They are listed in order of appearance during the regular season or post-season, since 1993. Prior years do not include post-season starts and list number of starts from greatest to fewest.

== Starting quarterbacks by season ==
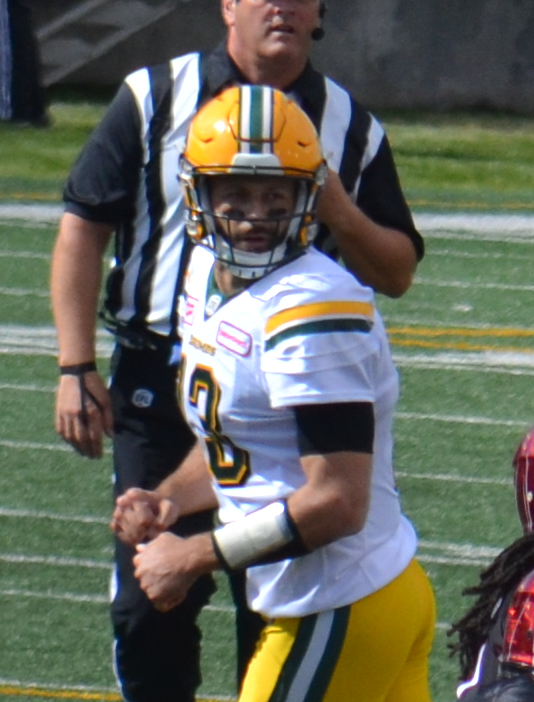
Michael Reilly most recently won the Grey Cup as Edmonton's starting quarterback.

Where known, the number of games they started during the season is listed to the right:

Season(s)	Regular season	Postseason
2026	Cody Fajardo (17) / Taylor Powell (1)	Cody Fajardo (1)
2025	Tre Ford (5) / Cody Fajardo (13)	
2024	McLeod Bethel-Thompson (13) / Tre Ford (5)	
2023	Taylor Cornelius (7) / Jarret Doege (1) / Tre Ford (10)	
2022	Nick Arbuckle (3) / Tre Ford (3) / Taylor Cornelius (12)	
2021	Trevor Harris (6) / Taylor Cornelius (8)	
2020	Season cancelled due to COVID-19 pandemic	
2019	Trevor Harris (13) / Logan Kilgore (5)	Trevor Harris (2)
2018	Michael Reilly (18)	
2017	Michael Reilly (18)	Michael Reilly (2)
2016	Michael Reilly (17) / James Franklin (1)	Michael Reilly (2)
2015	Michael Reilly (9) / Matt Nichols (7) / James Franklin (2)	Michael Reilly (2)
2014	Michael Reilly (14) / Matt Nichols (4)	Michael Reilly (1)
2013	Michael Reilly (18)	
2012	Steven Jyles (9) / Kerry Joseph (7) / Matt Nichols (2)	Kerry Joseph (1)
2011	Ricky Ray (18)	Ricky Ray (2)
2010	Ricky Ray (16) / Jared Zabransky (5)	
2009	Ricky Ray (18)	Ricky Ray (2)
2008	Ricky Ray (18)	Ricky Ray (1)
2007	Ricky Ray (13) / Stefan LeFors (5)	
2006	Ricky Ray (18)	
2005	Ricky Ray (18)	Ricky Ray (3)
2004	Jason Maas (18)	Jason Maas (1)
2003	Ricky Ray (18)	Ricky Ray (2)
2002	Jason Maas (7) / Ricky Ray (11)	Ricky Ray (2)
2001	Nealon Greene (6) / Jason Maas (12)	Jason Maas (1)
2000	Nealon Greene (15) / Dan Crowley (3)	Nealon Greene (1)
1999	Nealon Greene (11) / Marcus Crandell (3) / Kevin Mason (3) / Dan Crowley (1)	Nealon Greene (1)
1998	David Archer (13) / Jimmy Kemp (5)	David Archer (2)
1997	Danny McManus (15) / Jimmy Kemp (3)	Danny McManus (1)
1996	Danny McManus (17) / Cody Ledbetter (1)	Danny McManus (3)
1995	Kerwin Bell (12) / Chris Vargas (6)	Kerwin Bell (2)
1994	Damon Allen (17) / Rickey Foggie (1)	Damon Allen (1)
1993	Damon Allen (16) / Rickey Foggie (1) / Tom Muecke (1)	Damon Allen (3)
1992	Tracy Ham (15) / Tom Muecke (3)	
1991	Tracy Ham (15) / Warren Jones (3)	
1990	Tracy Ham (18)	
1989	Tracy Ham (18)	
1988	Tracy Ham (11) / Damon Allen (7)	
1987	Matt Dunigan (12) / Damon Allen (6)	
1986	Matt Dunigan (17) / Damon Allen (1)	
1985	Matt Dunigan (14) / Damon Allen (2)	

== Team passer rankings ==
Quarterbacks are listed by number of starts for the Edmonton Eskimos / Elks.

Name	GS	W–L–T	Comp	Att	Pct	Yards	TD	Int
Ricky Ray	148	79–68–1	3,225	4,827	66.8	40,531	210	130
Jackie Parker	100	71–27–2	769	1,484	51.8	12,137	70	93
Tom Wilkinson	98	65–27–6	1,382	2,251	61.4	18,684	129	96
Michael Reilly	94	53–41–0	2,120	3,195	66.4	26,929	143	82
Tracy Ham	77	52–25–0	1,216	2,333	52.1	19,240	142	89
Warren Moon	59	41–17–1	1,280	2,209	57.9	21,228	139	70
Matt Dunigan	56	34–21–1	926	1,654	56.0	13,393	87	76
Damon Allen	51	35–16–0	809	1,583	51.1	12,466	76	56
Bruce Lemmerman	41	27–12–2	754	1,383	54.5	9,747	60	73
Jason Maas	37	20–17–0	800	1,307	61.2	11,953	65	40
Don Getty	37	17–19–1	532	992	53.6	8,950	57	60
