= Jeff Kemp =

American football player (born 1959)

No. 9, 15, 16
- Position: Quarterback

Personal information
- Born: July 11, 1959 (age 67); Santa Ana, California, U.S.
- Listed height: 6 ft 0 in (1.83 m)
- Listed weight: 201 lb (91 kg)

Career information
- High school: Winston Churchill (Potomac, Maryland)
- College: Dartmouth (1977–1980)
- NFL draft: 1981: undrafted

Career history
- Los Angeles Rams (1981–1985); San Francisco 49ers (1986); Seattle Seahawks (1987–1991); Philadelphia Eagles (1991)

Career NFL statistics
- Passing attempts: 916
- Passing completions: 479
- Completion percentage: 52.3%
- TD–INT: 39–40
- Passing yards: 6,230
- Passer rating: 70
- Stats at Pro Football Reference

Jeffrey Allan Kemp (born July 11, 1959) is an American former professional football player who was a quarterback in the National Football League (NFL) for the Los Angeles Rams, San Francisco 49ers, Seattle Seahawks, and Philadelphia Eagles. He played college football for the Dartmouth Big Green in the Ivy League, and was not selected in the 1981 NFL draft. In 1984, Kemp led the Rams with thirteen touchdown passes and a trip to the playoffs. As a back-up to the injured Joe Montana in 1986, he threw eleven touchdown passes for the 49ers.

Kemp is the son of late former AFL quarterback and American politician Jack Kemp (1935–2009), and brother of former Canadian Football League quarterback Jimmy Kemp (b. 1971). Kemp and his wife, Stacy, have four sons: Kyle, Kory, Kolby, and Keegan. He graduated from Winston Churchill High School in Potomac, Maryland.

== College career ==
At Dartmouth College in 1979, Jeff Kemp was named the starting quarterback for the Big Green, winning the job over Joe McLaughlin. That season, Dartmouth, led by head coach Joseph Yukica went 4–3 in Ivy League play (4–4–1 overall). Dartmouth finished fifth in the Ivy League, just behind Cornell and ahead of Harvard. Playing in all nine games that season, Kemp completed 81 passes on 182 attempts for 915 yards. He threw six touchdown passes and five interceptions. His primary target was wide receiver Dave Shula, who was the son of then Dolphins head coach Don Shula.

The 1980 season started with a 40–7 win over a very weak University of Pennsylvania team. Dartmouth would also score a decisive win over Columbia as well, 48–0. While Dartmouth, led by Kemp scored 207 points, they yielded 170 and ended up going 4–3 in the league, and 4–6 overall. Kemp's college career ended with a 27–24 loss to Princeton.

== Professional career ==
In 1981, Kemp signed with the Los Angeles Rams as an undrafted free agent. Kemp was one of four quarterbacks the Rams carried on the roster that season. When former starter Vince Ferragamo bolted the Rams to sign with Montreal of the Canadian Football League, the Rams inserted Pat Haden as the full time starter, with Raiders cast off Dan Pastorini as the second string and former draft pick Jeff Rutledge as the third stringer quarterback. Pastorini drew the start against the Washington Redskins and was ineffective, going 8 for 21 and two interceptions. With the Rams down 30–7, Kemp made his NFL debut late in the game. He went two for six with an interception.

Kemp would not see the field at all during the strike shortened 1982 season and made a handful of appearances during the 1983 season. One of those was a token appearance to do a kneel down during the Rams 41–17 blow out win against the Buffalo Bills, a team his father starred for and won a championship with in the American Football League during the 1960s. That season the Rams made the playoffs and faced the Redskins in the Divisional playoff game. Ferragamo played one of the worst games of his career, throwing three interceptions. He was benched in favor of Kemp later in the eventual 51–7 loss. In 1984, after Ferragamo went 1–3 as a starter to begin the season, head coach John Robinson made the switch, benching the one-time Rams star in favor of Kemp. Kemp started the rest of the season, and finished with a 9–4 record as a starter, completing 143 passes out of 284 attempts for 2,021 yards, with thirteen touchdown passes against seven interceptions. The Rams finished 10–6 but lost to the New York Giants in the Wild Card Round.

The following season, the Rams traded Ferragamo to the Buffalo Bills for tight end Tony Hunter. Despite Ferragamo being gone, Kemp was not assured to be the starter. Despite the poise and ability to start he showed during the 1984 season, the Rams signed Canadian League star Dieter Brock to be the team's starting quarterback. Kemp only made one start that season, a 24–17 loss to the Giants. The Rams cast their luck with Brock, who did manage to lead the team to the playoffs, where they were trounced by the Chicago Bears and their vaunted 46 defense in the NFC Championship. The following season, the Rams revamped their quarterback rotation again as Brock suffered an injury during preseason that later led to him retiring, while the Rams signed former Falcon star Steve Bartkowski and acquired Jim Everett from the Houston Oilers. Kemp was not re-signed and played the 1986 season with the Rams rival San Francisco 49ers, where he backed-up Joe Montana. When Montana was injured, Kemp started six games, going 3–2–1 during that period. One of those games was a 31–16 win over the Miami Dolphins, coached by Don Shula, father of Dave Shula, one of Kemp's teammates at Dartmouth.

The next season, Kemp was with the Seattle Seahawks and was one of the players who crossed the picket lines. He won his only start that year, a 32–17 victory over a Detroit Lions team made up of mainly replacement players. Kemp would play with the Seahawks for the bulk of his remaining years in the NFL. He was released during the 1991 season, but quickly found a job with the Philadelphia Eagles. The Eagles struggled at quarterback that season, mainly with injuries. Starter Randall Cunningham went down, followed by backup Jim McMahon. Rookie Brad Goebel was inserted, but quickly too was a victim of the injury bug. The Eagles signed Kemp, and then coaxed former New York Jets quarterback Pat Ryan out of retirement. Kemp started two games for the Eagles, going one and one.

The 1991 season was Kemp's last as an NFL player. He finished with a 16–12–1 record as a starter, and 39 touchdowns versus 40 interceptions.

== Post NFL career ==
In the years following the conclusion of his playing career, Kemp became a motivational speaker and wrote a book called Facing the Blitz.
