= Warren Jones =

Warren Jones may refer to:

- Warren Jones (Canadian football) (born 1966), American quarterback
- Warren Jones (footballer) (born 1953), former Australian rules footballer
- Warren Jones (Idaho judge) (1943–2018), American judge
- Warren Leroy Jones (1895–1993), United States federal judge
- Rhubarb Jones (born Warren Jones, 1951–2017), American DJ at WYAY "Eagle 106.7" in Atlanta, Georgia
