= Heath Rylance =

American gridiron football player (born 1972)

No. 7
- Position: Quarterback

Personal information
- Born: June 21, 1972 (age 54); Mitchell, South Dakota, U.S.
- Listed height: 6 ft 1 in (1.85 m)
- Listed weight: 205 lb (93 kg)

Career information
- College: Augustana (1990–1994)
- NFL draft: 1995: undrafted

Career history
- 1995–1998: Saskatchewan Roughriders
- 1999: Calgary Stampeders

Awards and highlights
- 2× First-team All-NCC (1991, 1993); 2× Second-team All-NCC (1992, 1994)

Heath Rylance (born June 21, 1972) is an American former professional football quarterback who played four seasons in the Canadian Football League (CFL) with the Saskatchewan Roughriders and Calgary Stampeders. He played college football at Augustana College.

== Early life ==
Heath Rylance was born on June 21, 1972, in Mitchell, South Dakota. He was a three-year starter at quarterback at Watertown High School in Watertown, South Dakota. As a senior in 1989, he completed 80 of 166 passes for 845 yards and seven touchdowns while also rushing for 638 yards and ten touchdowns. Rylance participated in basketball, track, and baseball in high school as well.

== College career ==
Rylance was a member of the Augustana Vikings of Augustana College from 1990 to 1994. He was redshirted in 1990. He earned second-team All-North Central Conference (NCC) honors in 1991 although the team finished with an 0–10 record. He was named first-team All-NCC the next year as the Vikings improved to 8–3. Rylance was also a second-team All-NCC selection in 1993 and a first-team All-NCC choice in 1994. He suffered a knee injury and a concussion his senior year. He threw for 7,132 yards and 50 touchdowns during his college career. Rylance was inducted into the Augustana College athletics hall of fame in 2007.

== Professional career ==
=== Saskatchewan Roughriders ===
Rylance was signed by the Saskatchewan Roughriders of the Canadian Football League (CFL) in March 1995. He suffered a pulled stomach muscle during training camp and was released on June 4, 1995. He was later signed to the Roughriders' practice roster in July 1995. Rylance was active as the third-string quarterback for the final four games of the 1995 season but did not see any playing time.

On July 14, 1996, he entered a 24–14 game early in the fourth quarter in relief of Warren Jones. Rylance completed four of ten passes for 147 yards while also rushing for a touchdown as the Roughriders lost 27–24 to the Hamilton Tiger-Cats. Rylance was named the starter for the August 11 game against the Montreal Alouettes in place of the benched Jones. In his first career CFL start, Rylance completed nine of 15 passes for 184 yards and one interception while also rushing eight times for 54 yards as the Roughriders lost 32–20. He left the game early in the fourth quarter after suffering a concussion. Later in the year, he suffered a season-ending knee injury. Overall, Rylance dressed in nine games, starting one, during the 1996 season, totaling 37 completions on 72 passing attempts (51.4%) for 614 yards and three interceptions while rushing for 96 yards and one touchdown. He had reconstructive surgery on his knee that caused him to miss the entire 1997 season.

On August 27, 1998, against the Edmonton Eskimos, Rylance made his first start in two years, starting in place of the injured Reggie Slack. He completed ten of 20 passes for 164 yards and two interceptions as the Roughriders lost 35–13. Overall, he dressed in all 18 games, starting one, in 1998, recording 21 completions on 49 attempts (42.9%) for 305 yards, one touchdown, and two interceptions. Rylance was released by the Roughriders on July 3, 1999.

=== Calgary Stampeders ===
Rylance signed with the Calgary Stampeders on August 12, 1999. He was the third-stringer behind Oteman Sampson and starter Mike McCoy for two games. Rylance was released by the Stampeders on August 25, 1999, after Dave Dickenson returned from injury.

== Personal life ==
Rylance and three partners founded a financial consulting business.
