= Ian "Rocky" Butler =

American gridiron football player (born 1979)

No. 12, 19
- Position: Quarterback

Personal information
- Born: August 7, 1979 (age 47); Allentown, Pennsylvania, U.S.
- Listed height: 6 ft 0 in (1.83 m)
- Listed weight: 190 lb (86 kg)

Career information
- College: Hofstra
- NFL draft: 2002: undrafted

Career history
- Saskatchewan Roughriders (2002–2005); New York Dragons (2006)*; Saskatchewan Roughriders (2006); Hamilton Tiger-Cats (2007)*; Toronto Argonauts (2007)
- * Offseason or practice squad member only

Ian "Rocky" Butler (born August 7, 1979) is an American former professional football quarterback who played in the Canadian Football League (CFL).

== Early life and education ==
Butler was born August 7, 1979, in Allentown, Pennsylvania, and played high school football at Dieruff High School in Allentown. He then attended Hofstra University in Hempstead, New York, on Long Island, where he started two seasons as quarterback for the Hofstra team. In 2001, he finished second in voting for the Walter Payton Award, given to the top player in the NCAA Division I Football Championship Subdivision.

== CFL career ==
In May 2002, Butler was signed as a free agent by the Saskatchewan Roughriders, the fourth-string quarterback that year. But after a bizarre rash of injuries to all three of Saskatchewan's roster quarterbacks, Butler earned his first CFL start in the 2002 Labour Day Classic against the powerful Winnipeg Blue Bombers. Although he only completed 9 of 16 passes for 165 yards that day, he rushed for three touchdowns and helped the Riders score a convincing upset victory. He failed to duplicate that success in his next two CFL appearances, both in Week 1 of the 2004 CFL season when starter Nealon Greene broke his leg and the Riders had to play two games in five days.

In 2006, Kerry Joseph, the Riders starting quarterback, was injured and unable to start a game against the Hamilton Tiger-Cats, and backup Marcus Crandell was injured earlier in the game, and Butler pulled off two more wins against the struggling Tiger-Cats, 43-13 and 51–8, and threw for five touchdowns and ran for two more. On January 31, 2007, Butler was dealt in a multi-player trade to the Hamilton Tiger-Cats, and was cut by the team in June 2007. On July 16, 2007, Butler signed a practice roster agreement with the Toronto Argonauts, and was released in April 2008 after the team signed Kerry Joseph the month before.

With Saskatchewan, he earned his nickname Rocky, and the team played the Rocky theme song, Survivor's "Eye of the Tiger", whenever he entered the game at quarterback.

== Arena Football League ==
During the 2006 off-season, he signed with the New York Dragons of the Arena Football League. He was cut during training camp and spent the rest of the AFL season on the team's practice roster.

== Personal ==
During the CFL offseason, he was a substitute teacher in New York.
