= Pat Ryan (American football) =

American football player (born 1955)

No. 4, 10
- Position: Quarterback

Personal information
- Born: September 16, 1955 (age 71); Hutchinson, Kansas, U.S.
- Listed height: 6 ft 3 in (1.91 m)
- Listed weight: 210 lb (95 kg)

Career information
- High school: Putnam City (Warr Acres, Oklahoma)
- College: Tennessee
- NFL draft: 1978: 11th round, 281st overall pick

Career history
- New York Jets (1978–1989); Cleveland Browns (1990); Philadelphia Eagles (1991)

Career NFL statistics
- Passing attempts: 657
- Passing completions: 364
- Completion percentage: 55.4%
- TD–INT: 31–35
- Passing yards: 4,320
- Passer rating: 69.2
- Stats at Pro Football Reference

Patrick Lee Ryan (born September 16, 1955) is an American former professional football player who was a quarterback for 14 seasons in the National Football League (NFL) for the New York Jets and the Philadelphia Eagles. He played college football for the Tennessee Volunteers and was selected by the Jets in the 11th round of the 1978 NFL draft. After his playing career, he became a color analyst on the Vol Radio Network, broadcasting games for his alma mater.

== Biography ==
Ryan was born in Hutchinson, Kansas and attended Putnam City High School in Oklahoma City, Oklahoma. He played college football at the University of Tennessee.

Ryan was selected 281st overall in the 11th round of the 1978 NFL draft by the New York Jets. He played professionally for 13 seasons, 12 with the New York Jets and one with the Philadelphia Eagles.

Ryan was primarily a backup, seeing just 15 snaps in his first four years. His one significant season was in 1984, when he started 11 games for the Jets. He went 6–5 while throwing 14 touchdowns and fourteen interceptions for 1,939 yards. During the 1986-87 NFL playoffs, Ryan started for the Jets against the Kansas City Chiefs in the wild-card round. He threw three touchdown passes in a 35–15 Jets victory, their first playoff win in four years. The following week during the divisional round against the Cleveland Browns, Ryan threw a 42-yard touchdown on a flea-flicker to give the Jets a 7–0 first quarter lead. However, he suffered an injury that knocked him out in the second quarter (leading to the return of Ken O'Brien, who had started the regular season as quarterback), and the Jets would ultimately lose it 23–20 in double overtime, the third longest playoff game in NFL history at that time.

After being cut by the Browns in the summer before the 1990 season, Ryan was working as a general contractor. The Philadelphia Eagles asked him to come out of retirement as starter Randall Cunningham and backup Jim McMahon were injured. He signed with the team in September 1991 and was deployed in their Monday Night Football matchup versus the Washington Redskins at 36 years old. He completed four passes, threw three interceptions, and was sacked twice in a 23–0 loss. Ryan was waived in favor of former Seattle backup Jeff Kemp that October.

== Life after the NFL ==
Ryan was employed as a color analyst on Tennessee Titans radio broadcasts from 1999 to 2004. He is now a home builder in Knoxville, Tennessee. He later worked as a football analyst for the University of Tennessee's Vol Radio Network, cohosting the weekly "Big Orange Hotline," and joining Bob Kesling, Tim Priest, and John Wilkerson on the "Kickoff Call-In Show" prior to Tennessee Volunteer football games. In June 2021, Ryan became the color analyst for Tennessee Volunteers football following the announcement that Priest would be retiring.

== See also ==
- List of New York Jets starting quarterbacks
