= 1994 All-Big East Conference football team =

American college football all-star team

The 1994 All-Big East Conference football team consists of American football players chosen as All-Big East Conference players for the 1994 NCAA Division I-A football season. The organizations selecting All-Big East teams in 1994 included the conference coaches.

== Defensive selections ==
=== Quarterbacks ===
- Kevin Mason, Syracuse (Coaches-1)
- Henry Burris, Temple (Coaches-2)

=== Running backs ===
- Billy West, Pitt (Coaches-1)
- Terrell Willis, Rutgers (Coaches-1)
- James Stewart, Miami (FL) (Coaches-2)
- Kirby Dar Dar, Syracuse (Coaches-2)
- David Green, Boston College (Coaches-2)

=== Receivers ===
- Chris T. Jones, Miami (FL) (Coaches-1)
- Marvin Harrison, Syracuse (Coaches-1)
- Antonio Freeman, Virginia Tech (Coaches-2)
- Rahsaan Vanterpool, West Virginia (Coaches-2)
- Billy Davis, Pitt (Coaches-2)

=== Tight ends ===
- Pete Mitchell, Boston College (Coaches-1)
- Marco Battaglia, Rutgers (Coaches-2)

=== Offensive line ===
- Reuben Brown, Pitt (Coaches-1 [tackle])
- Pete Kendall, Boston College (Coaches-1 [tackle])
- Tom Robsock, West Virginia (Coaches-1 [guard])
- Greg Landry, Boston College (Coaches-1 [guard])
- K.C. Jones, Miami (FL) (Coaches-1 [center])
- Tirrell Greene, Miami (FL) (Coaches-2)
- Melvin Tuten, Syracuse (Coaches-2)
- Ken Dammann, Rutgers (Coaches-2)
- John Summer day, Temple (Coaches-2)
- Dave Wohlabaugh, Syracuse (Coaches-2)

== Defensive selections ==
=== Defensive line ===
- Mike Mamula, Boston College (Coaches-1)
- Barry Hawkins, West Virginia (Coaches-1)
- Warren Sapp, Miami (FL) (Coaches-1)
- Robert Sneathen, Rutgers (Coaches-2)
- Tom Barndt, Pitt (Coaches-2)
- Cornell Brown, Virginia Tech (Coaches-2)
- Pat Riley, Miami (FL) (Coaches-2)
- Tim Morabito, Boston College (Coaches-2)

=== Linebackers ===
- Stephen Boyd, Boston College (Coaches-1)
- Ken Brown, Virginia Tech (Coaches-1)
- Ray Lewis, Miami (FL) (Coaches-1)
- Dan Conley, Syracuse (Coaches-1)
- Corwin Francis, Miami (FL) (Coaches-2)
- Lance Johnstone, Temple (Coaches-2)
- Matt Taffoni, West Virginia (Coaches-2)

=== Defensive backs ===
- Aaron Beasley, West Virginia (Coaches-1 [cornerback])
- Carlos Jones, Miami (FL) (Coaches-1 [cornerback])
- C.J. Richardson, Miami (FL) (Coaches-1 [safety])
- Torrian Gray, Virginia Tech (Coaches-1 [safety])
- Chad Wilson, Miami (FL) (Coaches-2)
- Malcolm Pearson, Miami (FL) (Coaches-2)
- Mark Washington, Rutgers (Coaches-2)
- Antonio Banks, Virginia Tech (Coaches-2)
- William Yarborough, Virginia Tech (Coaches-2)

== Special teams ==
=== Kickers ===
- Ryan Williams, Virginia Tech (Coaches-1)
- Dane Prewitt, Miami (FL) (Coaches-2)
- Bryan Baumann, West Virginia (Coaches-2)

=== Punters ===
- Todd Sauerbrun, West Virginia (Coaches-1)
- Jeff Beckley, Boston College (Coaches-2)

=== Return specialist ===
- Jammi German, Miami (FL) (Coaches-1)
- Antonio Freeman, Virginia Tech (Coaches-2)

== Key ==
Coaches, selected by the eight Big East Conference head coaches

== See also ==
- 1994 All-America college football team
