= List of New York Jets starting quarterbacks =

These quarterbacks have started at least one game played for the New York Jets of the National Football League (NFL). They are listed in order of the date of each player's first start.

== Regular season ==
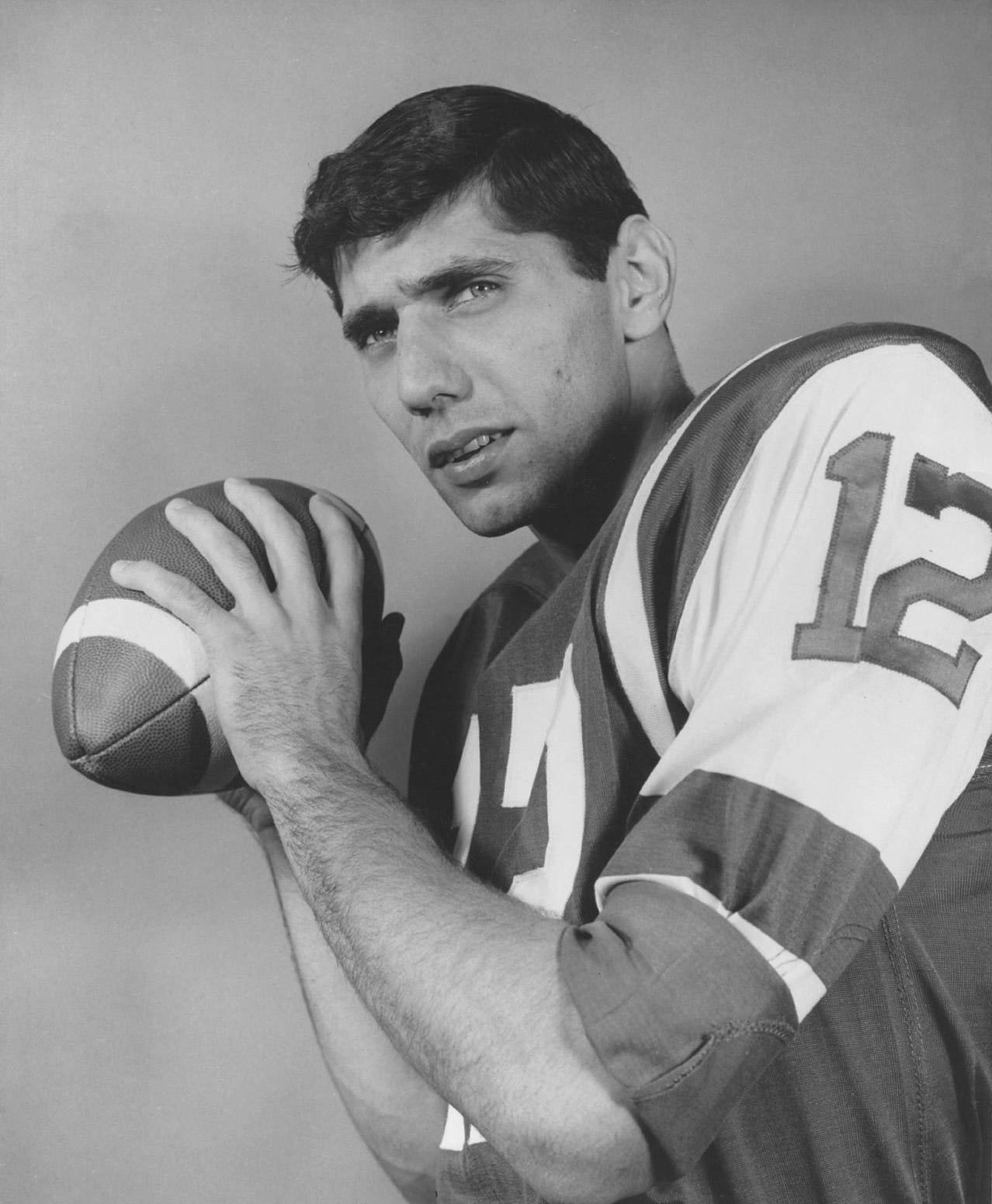
Joe Namath (1965–1976)

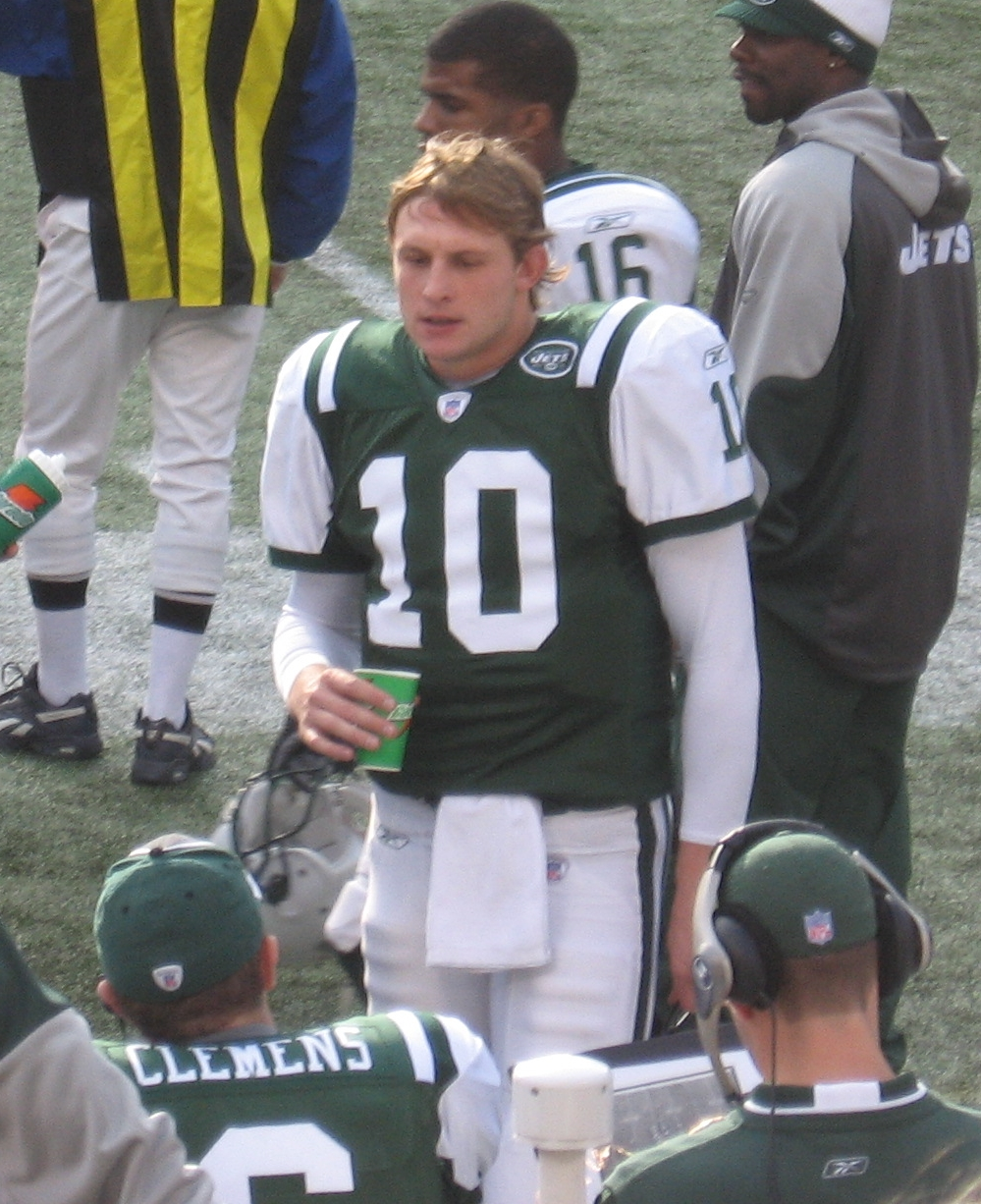
Chad Pennington (2002–2007)

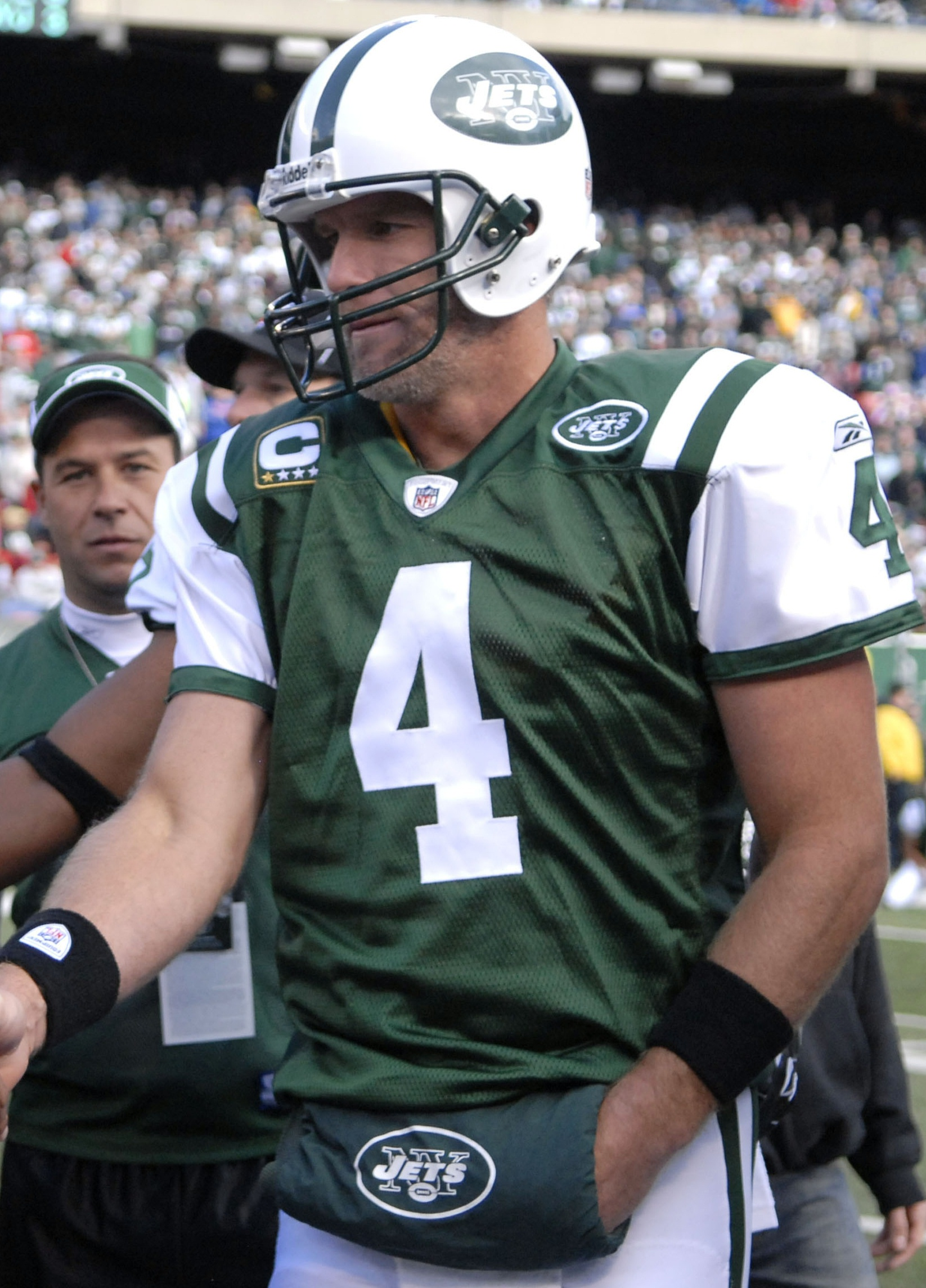
Brett Favre (2008)

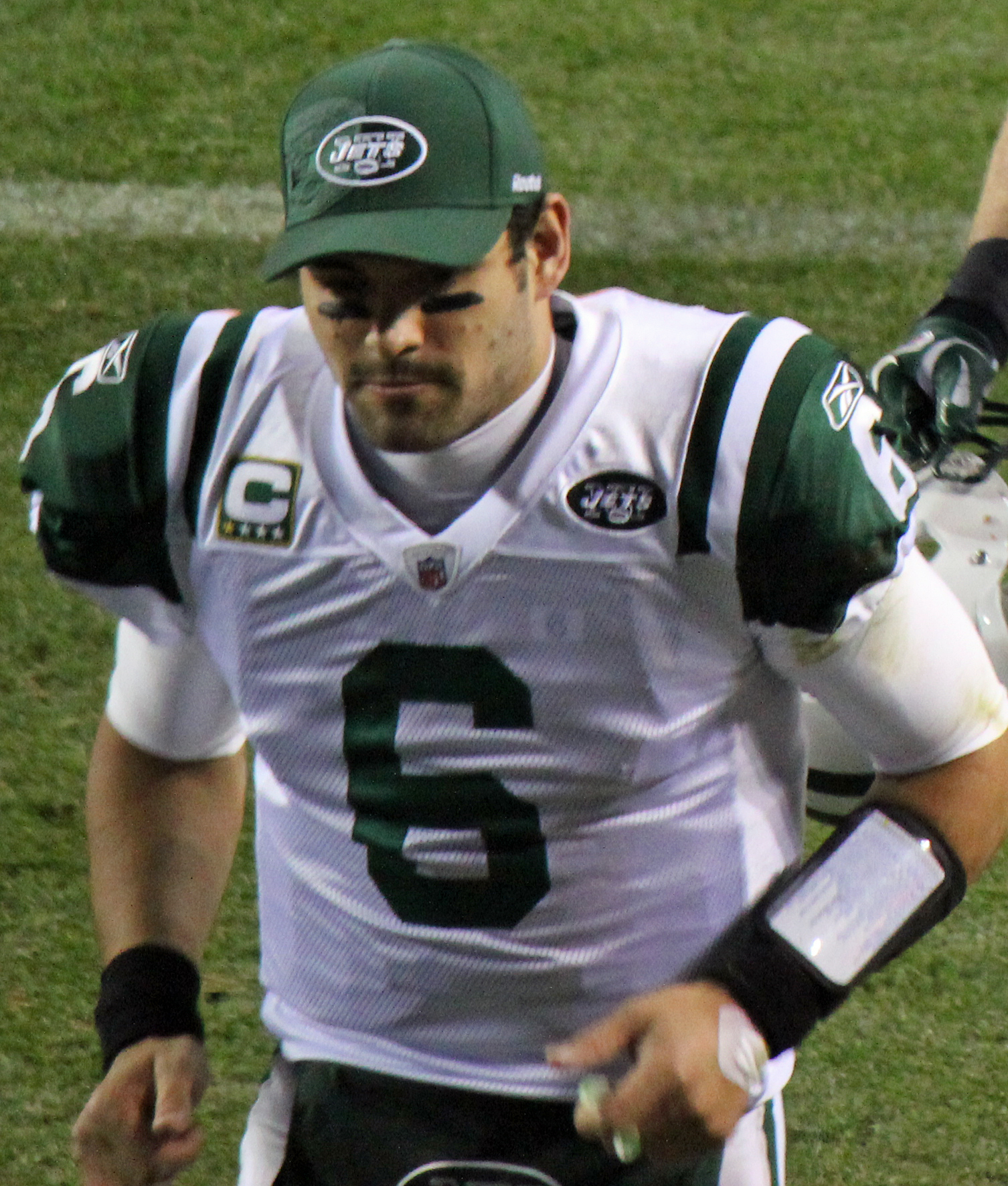
Mark Sanchez (2009–2012)

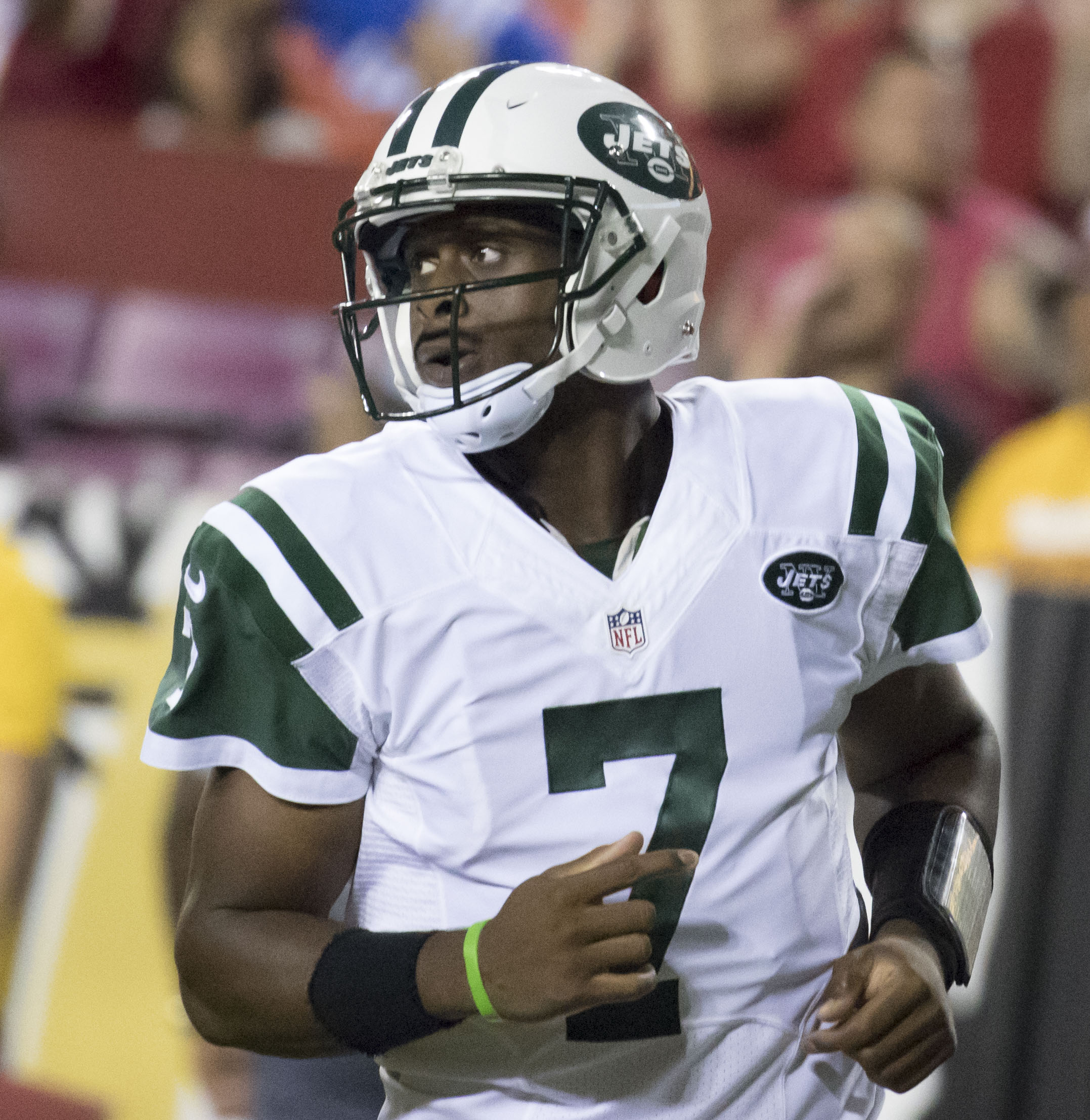
Geno Smith (2013–2014, 2016, 2026)

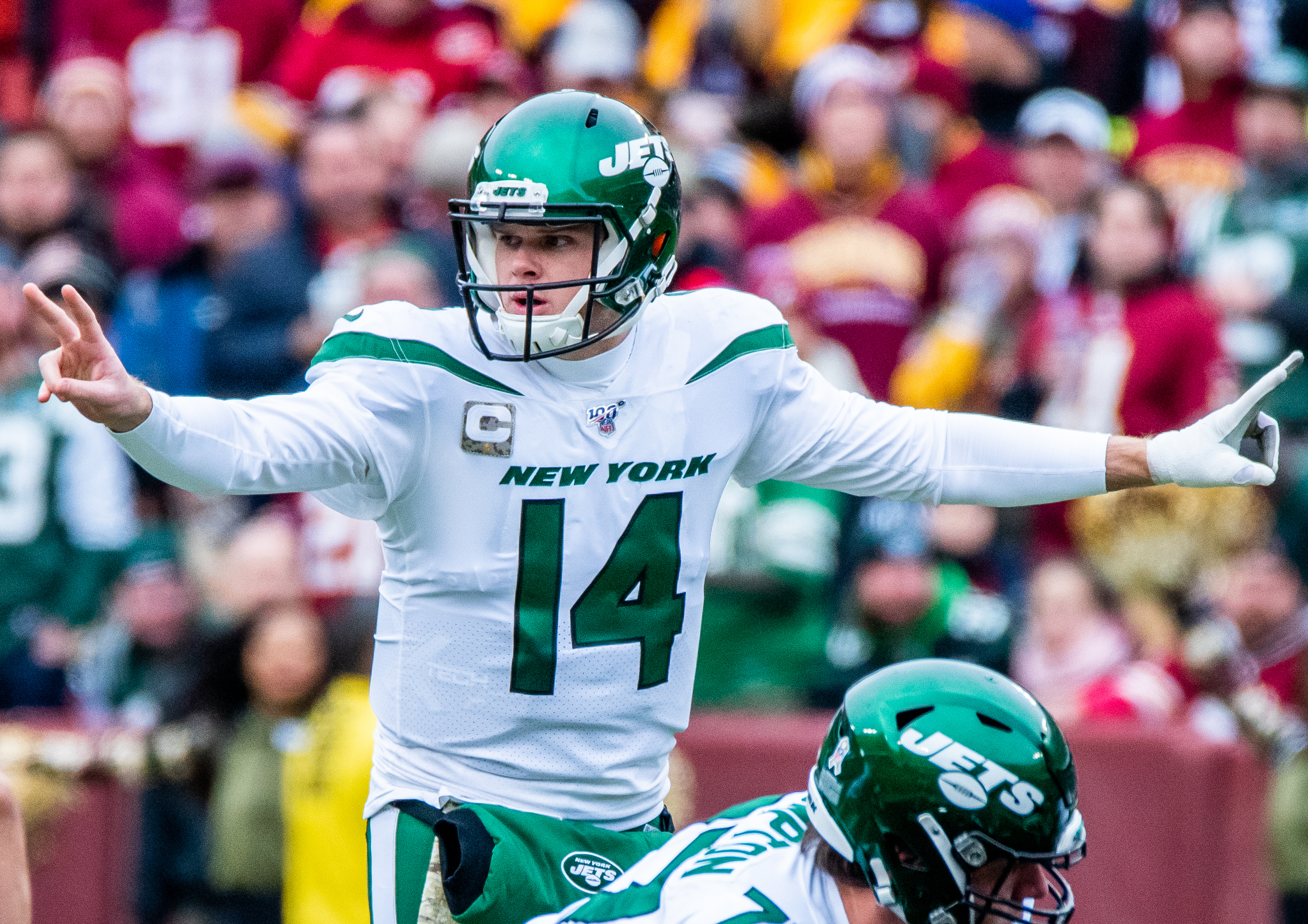
Sam Darnold (2018–2020)

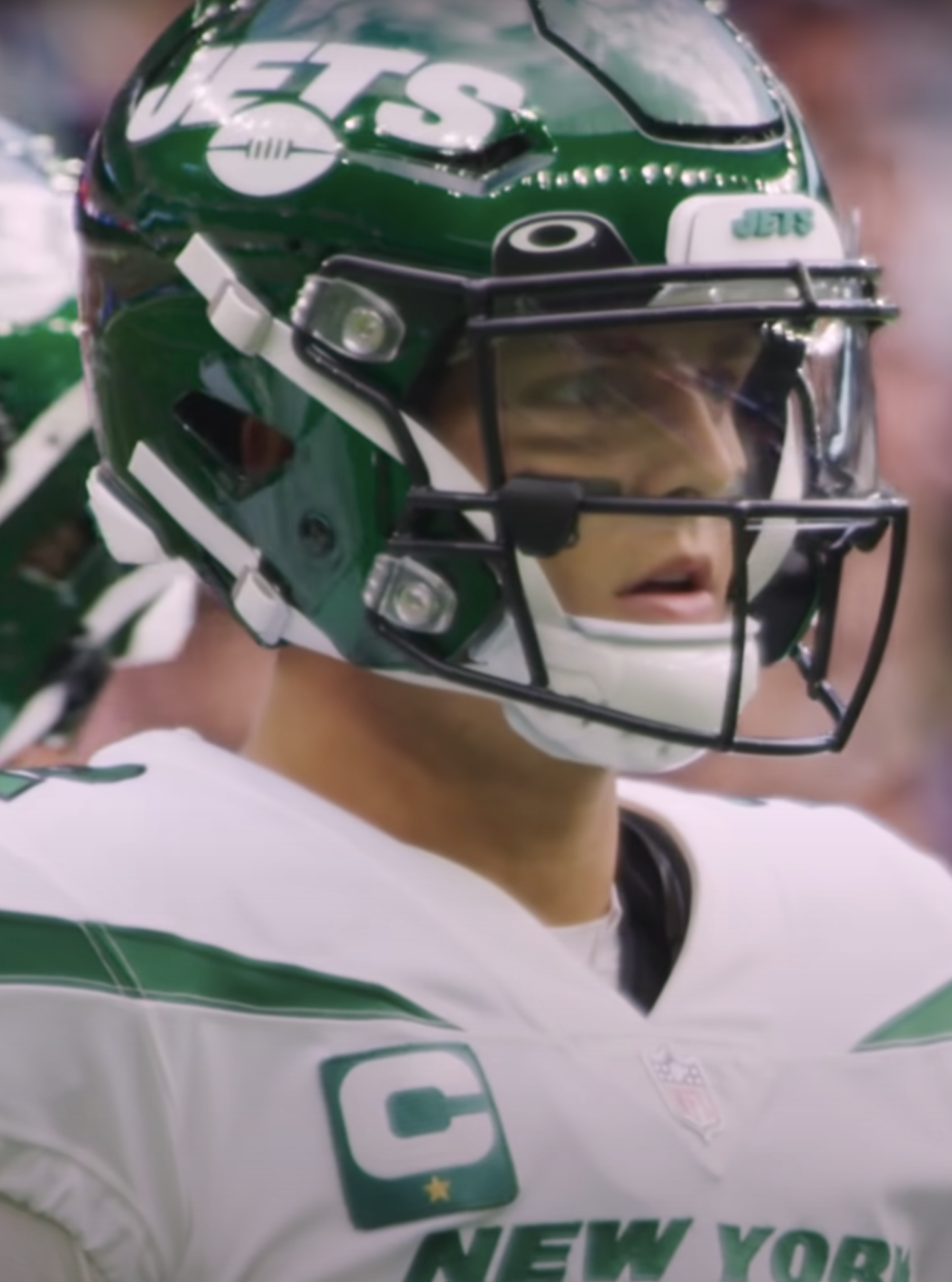
Zach Wilson (2021–2023)

Season(s)	Quarterback (games)
1960	Al Dorow (13) / Dick Jamieson (1)
1961	Al Dorow (14)
1962	Johnny Green (8) / Lee Grosscup (4) / Butch Songin (2)
1963	Dick Wood (12) / Galen Hall (2)
1964	Dick Wood (13) / Pete Liske (1)
1965	Joe Namath (9) / Mike Taliaferro (5)
1966	Joe Namath (13) / Mike Taliaferro (1)
1967	Joe Namath (14)
1968	Joe Namath (14)
1969	Joe Namath (14)
1970	Al Woodall (9) / Joe Namath (5)
1971	Bob Davis (7) / Al Woodall (4) / Joe Namath (3)
1972	Joe Namath (13) / Bob Davis (1)
1973	Al Woodall (6) / Joe Namath (5) / Bill Demory (3)
1974	Joe Namath (14)
1975	Joe Namath (13) / J.J. Jones (1)
1976	Joe Namath (8) / Richard Todd (6)
1977	Richard Todd (11) / Matt Robinson (1) / Marty Domres (2)
1978	Matt Robinson (11) / Richard Todd (5)
1979	Richard Todd (15) / Matt Robinson (1)
1980	Richard Todd (16)
1981	Richard Todd (16)
1982	Richard Todd (9)
1983	Richard Todd (16)
1984	Pat Ryan (11) / Ken O'Brien (5)
1985	Ken O'Brien (16)
1986	Ken O'Brien (14) / Pat Ryan (2)
1987	Ken O'Brien (12) / David Norrie (2) / Pat Ryan (1)
1988	Ken O'Brien (12) / Pat Ryan (4)
1989	Ken O'Brien (12) / Tony Eason (2) / Pat Ryan (1) / Kyle Mackey (1)
1990	Ken O'Brien (16)
1991	Ken O'Brien (16)
1992	Browning Nagle (13) / Ken O'Brien (3)
1993	Boomer Esiason (16)
1994	Boomer Esiason (14) / Jack Trudeau (2)
1995	Boomer Esiason (12) / Bubby Brister (4)
1996	Frank Reich (7) / Neil O'Donnell (6) / Glenn Foley (3)
1997	Neil O'Donnell (14) / Glenn Foley (2)
1998	Vinny Testaverde (13) / Glenn Foley (3)
1999	Ray Lucas (9) / Rick Mirer (6) / Vinny Testaverde (1)
2000	Vinny Testaverde (16)
2001	Vinny Testaverde (16)
2002	Chad Pennington (12) / Vinny Testaverde (4)
2003	Chad Pennington (9) / Vinny Testaverde (7)
2004	Chad Pennington (13) / Quincy Carter (3)
2005	Brooks Bollinger (9) / Vinny Testaverde (4) / Chad Pennington (3)
2006	Chad Pennington (16)
2007	Chad Pennington (8) / Kellen Clemens (8)
2008	Brett Favre (16)
2009	Mark Sanchez (15) / Kellen Clemens (1)
2010	Mark Sanchez (16)
2011	Mark Sanchez (16)
2012	Mark Sanchez (15) / Greg McElroy (1)
2013	Geno Smith (16)
2014	Geno Smith (13) / Michael Vick (3)
2015	Ryan Fitzpatrick (16)
2016	Ryan Fitzpatrick (11) / Bryce Petty (4) / Geno Smith (1)
2017	Josh McCown (13) / Bryce Petty (3)
2018	Sam Darnold (13) / Josh McCown (3)
2019	Sam Darnold (13) / Luke Falk (2) / Trevor Siemian (1)
2020	Sam Darnold (12) / Joe Flacco (4)
2021	Zach Wilson (13) / Mike White (3) / Joe Flacco (1)
2022	Zach Wilson (9) / Mike White (4) / Joe Flacco (4)
2023	Zach Wilson (11) / Trevor Siemian (3) / Tim Boyle (2) / Aaron Rodgers (1)
2024	Aaron Rodgers (17)
2025	Justin Fields (9) / Tyrod Taylor (4) / Brady Cook (4)
2026	Geno Smith (3)

== Postseason ==
Season	Quarterback(s)
1968	Joe Namath (2–0)
1969	Joe Namath (0–1)
1981	Richard Todd (0–1)
1982	Richard Todd (2–1)
1985	Ken O'Brien (0–1)
1986	Pat Ryan (1–1)
1991	Ken O'Brien (0–1)
1998	Vinny Testaverde (1–1)
2001	Vinny Testaverde (0–1)
2002	Chad Pennington (1–1)
2004	Chad Pennington (1–1)
2006	Chad Pennington (0–1)
2009	Mark Sanchez (2–1)
2010	Mark Sanchez (2–1)

== Most games as starting quarterback ==
These quarterbacks have the most starts for the Jets in regular season games.

GP	Games played
GS	Games started
W	Number of wins as starting quarterback
L	Number of losses as starting quarterback
T	Number of ties as starting quarterback
Pct	Winning percentage as starting quarterback

Name	Period	GP	GS	W	L	T	%
Joe Namath	1966–1976	136	125	60	61	4	.496
Ken O'Brien	1984–1992	124	106	50	55	1	.476
Richard Todd	1976–1983	102	94	42	51	1	.452
Mark Sanchez	2009–2012	62	62	33	29	—	.532
Vinny Testaverde	1998–2003, 2005	65	61	35	26	—	.574
Chad Pennington	2000–2007	69	61	32	29	—	.525

== Team career passing records ==
Name	Comp	Att	%	Yds	TD	Int
Ken O'Brien	2,039	3,465	58.8	24,386	124	95
Joe Namath	1,836	3,655	50.2	27,057	170	215
Richard Todd	1,433	2,623	54.6	18,241	110	138
Chad Pennington	1,259	1,919	65.6	13,738	82	55
Vinny Testaverde	1,094	1,854	59.0	12,497	77	58
Mark Sanchez	1,028	1,867	55.1	12,092	68	69

== See also ==
- Lists of NFL starting quarterbacks
