= Marcus Crandell =

American gridiron football player and coach (born 1974)

No. 8
- Position: Quarterback

Personal information
- Born: January 6, 1974 (age 52); Charlotte, North Carolina, U.S.
- Listed height: 5 ft 11 in (1.80 m)
- Listed weight: 205 lb (93 kg)

Career information
- High school: Roanoke (Robersonville, North Carolina)
- College: East Carolina (1992–1996)
- NFL draft: 1997: undrafted

Career history

Playing
- Edmonton Eskimos (1997–1999); Kansas City Chiefs (2000)*; → Scottish Claymores (2000); Green Bay Packers (2000)*; Memphis Maniax (2001); Calgary Stampeders (2001–2004); Saskatchewan Roughriders (2005–2008)
- * Offseason or practice squad member only

Coaching
- Saskatchewan Roughriders (2009–2010) Offensive assistant; Edmonton Eskimos (2011–2012) Offensive coordinator & quarterbacks coach; Ottawa Redblacks (2014) Quarterbacks coach; Saskatchewan (2017) Offensive coordinator & quarterbacks coach; Livingstone (2022) Offensive coordinator & quarterbacks coach

Awards and highlights
- 2× Grey Cup champion (2001, 2007); Grey Cup Most Valuable Player (2001)

Career CFL statistics
- TD–INT: 86–88
- Passing yards: 17,227

Marcus Cornelius Crandell (born January 6, 1974) is an American former professional football quarterback and coach. He played 11 seasons for the Edmonton Eskimos, Calgary Stampeders and Saskatchewan Roughriders from 1997 to 2008 while also spending time in NFL Europe and the XFL. Crandell was named the Grey Cup Most Valuable Player after the Stampeders won the 89th Grey Cup in 2001. He also won a Grey Cup championship with the Roughriders in 2007 as the team's backup quarterback.

== Early life and college career ==
Crandell played high school football at Roanoke High School in Robersonville, North Carolina, before playing college football for the East Carolina Pirates.

After redshirting the 1992 season, Crandell was named the team's starting quarterback entering the 1993 season. In the second game against UCF, he suffered a broken leg and missed the remainder of the season. In 1994, Crandell led the Pirates to a 7–5 record and a Liberty Bowl berth, completing 230 of 401 passes for 2,687 yards with 21 touchdowns and 15 interceptions. In 1995, he completed 235 of 447 passes for 2,751 yards with 18 touchdowns and 12 interceptions, adding a career-high six rushing touchdowns. The Pirates finished 9–3 that season and defeated Stanford 19–13 in the 1995 Liberty Bowl. Crandell was named to the All-Independent team by The Football News and the Associated Press. In 1996, his senior season, Crandell appeared in seven games, missing the final four, and compiled a 5–2 record in the games he played. He completed 136 of 245 passes for 1,507 yards, throwing 16 touchdowns and 10 interceptions, and was named a candidate for the Johnny Unitas Golden Arm Award.

Crandell finished his career at East Carolina University holding more than 30 passing and offensive records. He completed 620 of 1,133 passes for 7,198 yards with 58 touchdowns and 38 interceptions, while adding seven rushing touchdowns. In 2022, he was inducted into the East Carolina University Hall of Fame.

== Professional career ==
=== Edmonton Eskimos ===
On May 2, 1997, Crandell signed with the Edmonton Eskimos of the Canadian Football League, spending three seasons primarily as a backup quarterback. In 1997, he backed up Danny McManus and Jimmy Kemp, then served as a backup to David Archer and Kemp in 1998. In 1999, he was the backup to Nealon Greene, dressing for 13 games and making two starts. He started two games, one against Hamilton on August 27 and the other against Montreal on October 23, both resulting in losses. In the 1999 West Semi-Final against Calgary, he relieved Greene and completed 10 of 14 passes for 137 yards with one touchdown and one interception. Overall, Crandell dressed for 35 games with Edmonton, recording his most significant playing time in 1999, when he completed 59 of 112 passes for 767 yards with three touchdowns and five interceptions, along with 75 rushing yards and one rushing touchdown. On February 20, 2000, he was granted free agency.

=== Kansas City Chiefs / Scottish Claymores ===
On March 7, 2000, Crandell signed with the Kansas City Chiefs and was subsequently allocated to the Scottish Claymores in NFL Europe for the 2000 season. In nine games with the Claymores, he shared quarterback duties with Kevin Daft and completed 65 of 121 passes for 754 yards, throwing five touchdowns and four interceptions, while adding 51 rushing yards with two rushing touchdowns. He was released by the Chiefs on July 20, 2000.

=== Green Bay Packers ===
Crandell was signed by the Green Bay Packers on August 1, 2000, appeared in the preseason, and was released prior to the regular season on August 27.

=== Memphis Maniax ===
In the 2001 XFL Draft, Crandell was selected in the first round, third overall by the Memphis Maniax. He entered training camp competing with Jim Druckenmiller and Craig Whelihan, ultimately earning the starting quarterback job for the league’s inaugural season. Crandell started Week 1 against the Birmingham Thunderbolts, completing 11 of 19 passes for 173 yards with one touchdown and one interception, leading the Maniax to a 22–20 victory—the franchise’s first win. However, his performance declined over the next two weeks, as Memphis scored a combined nine points in consecutive losses. He was subsequently benched in favor of both Whelihan and Druckenmiller during that span. Prior to Week 4, head coach Kippy Brown named Druckenmiller the new starter, stating, “We feel that some changes need to be made,” while also citing an aggravated foot injury. Crandell saw limited action for the remainder of the season, with his only additional appearance coming in relief during a Week 9 win over the Los Angeles Xtreme. Overall, Crandell appeared in four games, making three starts. He completed 33 of 69 passes for 473 yards, with one touchdown and two interceptions.

=== Calgary Stampeders ===
On May 31, 2001, Crandell signed as a free agent with the Calgary Stampeders. He lost the starting quarterback competition to Ben Sankey, as both were attempting to replace Dave Dickenson, the previous season’s CFL Most Outstanding Player. When Sankey injured his thumb, Crandell took over as the starting quarterback. He led the Stampeders to second place in the West Division and victories in both the West Semi-Final and West Final. In the Grey Cup, Crandell guided Calgary to an upset win over the favored Winnipeg Blue Bombers and was named Grey Cup MVP after throwing for 309 yards and two touchdown passes in a 27–19 victory. On the season, he dressed for 15 games, starting 12, and completed 239 of 386 passes for 3,407 yards with 14 touchdowns and 11 interceptions. He also led the league with a 61.9% completion percentage and ran for 295 yards with seven rushing touchdowns. In the postseason, he threw nine touchdown passes without an interception. Crandell returned in 2002 as the Stampeders’ starting quarterback, throwing for a career-high 4,072 yards with 26 touchdowns and 20 interceptions over 16 starts. Over the 2002–2004 seasons, he started 34 games with a combined 10–24 record, and Calgary missed the playoffs in all three years. Following the 2004 season, Crandell became a free agent.

On June 5, 2025, Crandell signed a one-day contract to retire as a Stampeders player.

=== Saskatchewan Roughriders ===
In March 2005, Crandell signed as a free agent with the Saskatchewan Roughriders. He started the season as backup to Nealon Greene, a former teammate in Edmonton in 1999. Crandell relieved Greene in game 6 against Ottawa, game 7 against Montreal, and game 8 against Ottawa. In game 10, the Labour Day Classic against Winnipeg, Crandell got his first start as a Roughrider. The Roughriders won 45-26. Including this game, Crandell won his first five starts. However, he would lose his next three starts, and Greene would start the final game of the regular season in BC. Saskatchewan qualified for the East Semi-Final via the crossover. Crandell started the game against Montreal, but the Roughriders lost 30-14.

In 2006, the Roughriders acquired Kerry Joseph after the Ottawa Renegades ceased operations. Crandell started the season as his backup, but started against Hamilton in game 9 when Joseph was out with injury. Unfortunately, Crandell got injured early in the game, and was replaced by Rocky Butler. The Roughriders won 46-15. Crandell started the last game of the regular season in Edmonton, which Saskatchewan lost 20-18.

In 2007, Crandell was once again the backup to Joseph. Crandell started game 17 against Edmonton, which the Roughriders won 36-29 in overtime. Joseph won the CFL's Most Outstanding Player Award. The Roughriders won the 2007 Grey Cup, Crandell's second Grey Cup win.

In 2008, Joseph was traded to the Toronto Argonauts. Crandell started the season as the starting quarterback for the Roughriders, but suffered an injury in game 2 against BC. Crandell was 3-2 as the Roughrider starting quarterback, with wins against Edmonton, BC, and Calgary, and losses against Calgary and Edmonton. Following the Edmonton loss in August, the Roughriders were 6-2. However, they acquired Michael Bishop from Toronto, which prompted the Roughriders to release Crandell.

== Career statistics ==
=== CFL ===
As of 2025, the CFL lists Crandell with 64 games started at quarterback position. Previous CFL lists have a total of 67 games started (Calgary 48, Saskatchewan 16, Edmonton 3). The official 2025 CFL guide has Crandell's starting quarterback record as 25–39.

==== Regular season ====
Year	Team	Games			Passing								Rushing			
Year	Team	GD	GS	Record	Cmp	Att	Pct	Yds	Y/A	TD	Int	Rtg	Att	Yds	Avg	TD
1997	EDM	4	0	—	5	13	38.5	71	5.5	1	1	50.5	2	18	9.0	0
1998	EDM	18	0	—	4	9	44.4	100	11.1	1	2	82.9	0	0	0.0	0
1999	EDM	13	2	0–2	59	112	52.7	767	6.8	3	5	64.8	17	75	4.4	1
2001	CAL	15	12	6–6	239	386	61.9	3,407	8.8	14	11	90.7	58	295	5.1	7
2002	CAL	18	16	5–11	268	516	51.9	4,072	7.9	26	20	78.9	80	503	6.3	2
2003	CAL	15	9	3–6	147	291	50.5	2,019	6.9	10	13	65.9	17	57	3.4	0
2004	CAL	14	9	2–7	211	372	56.7	2,389	6.4	7	16	64.5	20	72	3.6	3
2005	SSK	18	8	5–3	200	351	57.0	2,295	6.5	12	11	75.1	39	160	4.1	5
2006	SSK	12	2	1–1	19	30	63.3	201	6.7	0	1	68.9	6	22	3.7	2
2007	SSK	18	1	1–0	78	131	59.5	982	7.5	5	5	79.8	10	47	4.7	0
2008	SSK	8	5	3–2	67	128	52.3	924	7.2	7	3	84.2	7	54	7.7	0
Career		153	64	26–38	1,297	2,338	55.5	17,227	7.4	86	88	75.6	256	1,303	5.1	20

==== Playoffs ====
Year & game	Team	GP	GS	ATT	COMP	YD	TD	INT	RUSH	YD	TD
1997 West Final	EDM	0	-	-	-	-	-	-	-	-	-
1998 West Semi-Final	EDM	1	0	0	-	-	-	-	0	-	-
1998 West Final	EDM	1	0	0	-	-	-	-	0	-	-
1999 West Semi-Final	EDM	1	0	14	10	137	1	1	0	-	-
2001 West Semi-Final	CGY	1	1	29	19	236	3	0	1	2	0
2001 West Final	CGY	1	1	28	21	323	4	0	6	37	0
2005 *East Semi-Final	SSK	1	1	48	33	306	2	3	7	18	0
2006 West Semi-Final	SSK	1	0	0	-	-	-	-	0	-	-
2006 West Final	SSK	1	0	0	-	-	-	-	0	-	-
2007 West Semi-Final	SSK	1	0	0	-	-	-	-	0	-	-
2007 West Final	SSK	1	0	0	-	-	-	-	0	-	-
Totals		10	3	119	83	1,002	10	4	14	57	0

*team qualified for crossover

==== Grey Cup ====
Year	Team	GP	GS	ATT	COMP	YD	TD	INT	RUSH	YD	TD
2001	CGY	1	1	35	18	309	2	0	5	22	0
2007	SSK	1	0	0	-	-	-	-	0	-	-
Totals		2	1	35	18	309	2	0	5	22	0

=== College ===
Season	Team	Games (Note: Crandell’s statistics from his bowl game appearances are excluded, as bowl game statistics were not officially counted toward season or career totals prior to 2002.)			Passing								Rushing			
Season	Team	GP	GS	Record	Cmp	Att	Pct	Yds	Y/A	TD	Int	Rtg	Att	Yds	Avg	TD
1992	East Carolina	0	0	—	Redshirted (redshirt)											
1993	East Carolina	2	2	1–1	19	40	47.5	253	6.3	3	1	120.4	7	37	5.3	0
1994	East Carolina	12	12	7–5	230	401	57.4	2,687	6.7	21	15	123.4	71	96	1.4	1
1995	East Carolina	12	12	9–3	235	447	52.6	2,751	6.2	18	12	112.2	94	201	2.1	6
1996	East Carolina	7	7	5–2	136	245	55.5	1,507	6.2	16	10	120.6	43	109	2.5	0
Career		33	33	22–11	620	1,133	54.7	7,198	6.4	58	38	118.3	215	443	2.1	7

== Coaching career ==
Crandell was hired by the Roughriders as an offensive assistant on July 7, 2009.

In 2011, he became the Offensive Coordinator of the Edmonton Eskimos. He was demoted to quarterbacks coach midway through the 2012 season and did not return to the Eskimos coaching staff in 2013.

For the 2014 season, Crandell joined the expansion Ottawa Redblacks as their quarterbacks coach. He became the offensive coordinator of the University of Saskatchewan Huskies in 2017.
