= Nealon Greene =

American gridiron football player (born 1976)

- Greene in his final regular season start against the BC Lions

Profile
- Position: Quarterback

Personal information
- Born: April 13, 1976 (age 50); Yonkers, New York, U.S.
- Listed height: 5 ft 10 in (1.78 m)
- Listed weight: 205 lb (93 kg)

Career information
- College: Clemson

Career history
- 1998: Toronto Argonauts
- 1999–2001: Edmonton Eskimos
- 2002–2005: Saskatchewan Roughriders
- 2006: Montreal Alouettes

Awards and highlights
- CFL record: Most rushing yards, quarterback – game (180) - July 16, 1999
- Stats at CFL.ca (archive)

Nealon Greene (born April 13, 1976) is an American former professional football quarterback who was active for nine seasons in the Canadian Football League (CFL). He played college football at Clemson University.

== Early life ==
Greene was born in Yonkers, New York. When finishing high school, he was recruited by Rich Bisaccia, the new running backs and special teams coach at Clemson University in South Carolina. Bissacia was also from Yonkers and Greene knew him through his family.

== College career ==
Greene spent his collegiate career with Clemson, where he became the school's career leader in passing yardage.

== Professional career ==
=== Toronto Argonauts ===
In June 1998, Greene was signed by the Toronto Argonauts of the Canadian Football League.

=== Edmonton Eskimos ===
On Jun 9, 1999, Greene, along with Marcello Simmons, was traded to the Edmonton Eskimos for Jimmy Kemp and Inoke Breckterfield. Greene was reunited with his head coach in Toronto, Don Matthews, who was now the head coach in Edmonton. On July 16, Greene set a CFL record for rushing yards in a single game by a quarterback with 180 yards. He threw for over 300 yards twice that season (309 in game 3 against Calgary, and 373 in game 6 against Winnipeg).

Greene became the clear Eskimos starter in 2000 while posting a 10-8 record and second-place finish. He threw for over 300 yards in four games that year (353 in game 8 against Saskatchewan, 311 in game 11 against BC, 341 in game 17 against Saskatchewan, and 314 in the West Semi-Final against BC). In the West Semi-Final, the Eskimos trailed 31-14 to start the fourth quarter, but were able to come back, and narrowly lose 34-32.

In 2001, Greene started six games for Edmonton, but second year Eskimo, Jason Maas, eventually took over as the starting quarterback.

=== Saskatchewan Roughriders ===
In 2002, Greene was subsequently traded to the Saskatchewan Roughriders with Simon Baffoe and a second round pick (offensive lineman Francois Boulianne) in the 2002 CFL draft for offensive lineman Dan Comiskey, running back Darren Davis, and kicker Mike O'Brien. Greene started 15 games for the Roughriders. He rushed for over 100 yards in two games (116 in game 1 against Ottawa, and 107 in game 3 against Montreal). In game 2 against Calgary, Greene threw a season-high 3 touchdowns, one of which went for 100 yards to Derick Armstrong. His season high for passing yards was 313 in game 14 against Winnipeg. The Roughriders qualified for the playoffs for the first time since their 1997 Grey Cup appearance. They crossed over to play in the East Semi-Final against one of Greene's former teams, the Toronto Argonauts. In the second quarter, the Roughriders led 12-0, but were only able to score a safety touch for the remainder of the game, and lost 24-14.

In 2003, Greene started sixteen games for the Roughriders, posting a 10-6 record, and led Saskatchewan to their first winning season since 1994. They defeated the Winnipeg Blue Bombers 37-21 in the first round of the postseason before losing to the Edmonton Eskimos in the western final by a score of 30-23.

The successful season of 2003 and further advancements having been made in the playoffs left the Roughriders fans looking positive. However, in the first game of the 2004 season against the Toronto Argonauts, Greene suffered a season-ending broken leg which resulted in a disappointing 9-9 season for Saskatchewan under back-up quarterback Henry Burris.

Greene recovered and returned in the 2005 season, where he retained the role of starter after the departure of Burris. The up-and-down season struggles saw the team start strongly with a 3-1 record, but fall to a disappointing 3-6 by the halfway point of the season. Seeing that change was necessary, Greene was benched and lost the starting role to back-up Marcus Crandell. Crandell quarterbacked the Riders to five straight victories during Greene's time on the bench, but later lost three crucial games in a row near the end of the season dropping the Roughriders to below .500 once again with an 8-9 record. Having nothing to lose, head coach Danny Barrett then returned to Greene to start in the last regular season game in BC. Greene led the Riders to victory in his final CFL start, salvaging another disappointing 9-9 season for the green and white. Although the season resulted in a last place finish in the west, Greene and the Roughriders had a stronger record than the third-place team in the east, the Ottawa Renegades, entitling the Roughriders to cross over divisions and make the eastern playoffs. However, despite the victory against the league-leading BC Lions the previous week under Greene, he was benched again in favor of Crandell and never saw any playing time in the ensuing 30-14 loss to the Montreal Alouettes in the east semi final.

=== Montreal Alouettes ===
On April 20, 2006, Greene was traded by Saskatchewan to the Montreal Alouettes. He was reunited with Matthews, now Montreal's head coach, and served as a back-up quarterback to Anthony Calvillo. Despite Calvillo's struggles and poor play later in the season, he remained the starter and Greene was never given a chance to start a game for Montreal.

In February 2007, Greene was released by the Alouettes.

Greene retired from pro football, he returned to Clemson University and continued his education.

== CFL statistics ==
=== Regular season ===
Season	Team	GP	GS	Pass att	Comp	Yards	TD	Int	Rush	Yards	TD
1998	TOR	18	0	15	10	123	0	0	7	41	0
1999	EDM	15	11	287	158	2046	14	12	97	878	4
2000	EDM	18	15	397	247	3059	22	6	101	760	2
2001	EDM	18	6	178	94	1241	2	7	45	280	0
2002	SSK	18	15	368	212	2621	13	9	94	548	3
2003	SSK	18	16	455	278	3398	20	9	121	723	5
2004	SSK	1	1	5	3	20	0	0	0	-	-
2005	SSK	18	10	298	182	1929	7	8	66	295	6
2006	MTL	18	0	15	8	81	0	5	12	35	0
CFL Totals		142	74	2018	1192	14,518	78	56	543	3565	20

=== Playoffs ===
Season	Team	Game	GP	GS	Pass att	Comp	Yards	TD	Int	Rush	Yards	TD
1998	TOR	East Semi-Final	1	0	0	-	-	-	-	0	-	-
1999	EDM	West Semi-Final	1	1	29	16	181	1	3	3	11	0
2000	EDM	West Semi-Final	1	1	35	25	314	2	0	6	46	0
2001	EDM	West Final	1	0	5	3	66	0	1	1	2	0
2002	SSK	*East Semi-Final	1	1	31	18	232	1	1	7	25	0
2003	SSK	West Semi-Final	1	1	15	5	93	1	1	6	46	0
2003	SSK	West Final	1	1	13	5	77	0	1	5	38	0
2004	SSK	West Semi-Final	1	0	0	-	-	-	-	0	-	-
2004	SSK	West Final	1	0	0	-	-	-	-	0	-	-
2005	SSK	*East Semi-Final	1	0	0	-	-	-	-	0	-	-
2006	MTL	East Final	1	0	0	-	-	-	-	0	-	-
CFL Totals			11	5	128	72	963	5	7	28	168	0

*Team qualified for Crossover

=== Grey Cup ===
Season	Team	GP	GS	Pass att	Rush
2006	MTL	1	0	0	0
