= Kevin Mason =

American gridiron football player (born 1972)

No. 11, 4, 12
- Positions: Quarterback, wide receiver

Personal information
- Born: September 25, 1972 (age 54); Buffalo, New York, U.S.
- Listed height: 6 ft 4 in (1.93 m)
- Listed weight: 205 lb (93 kg)

Career information
- High school: East (West Seneca, New York)
- College: Syracuse
- NFL draft: 1995: undrafted

Career history
- Oakland Raiders (1995)*; Saskatchewan Roughriders (1996–1997); Winnipeg Blue Bombers (1998); Montreal Alouettes (1998)*; Edmonton Eskimos (1999); Buffalo Destroyers (1999–2003); Philadelphia Soul (2004)*; Canton Legends (2005–2008); Erie RiverRats (2009)
- * Offseason or practice squad member only

Awards and highlights
- AIFL champion (2006); First-team All-Big East (1994)
- Stats at ArenaFan.com

Kevin M. Mason (born September 25, 1972) is an American former professional football quarterback who played four seasons in the Canadian Football League (CFL) with the Saskatchewan Roughriders, Winnipeg Blue Bombers, and Edmonton Eskimos. He played college football at Syracuse University. He was also a member of the Oakland Raiders, Montreal Alouettes, Buffalo Destroyers, Philadelphia Soul, Canton Legends and Erie RiverRats.

== Early life and college ==
Kevin M. Mason was born on September 25, 1972, in Buffalo, New York. He attended West Seneca East Senior High School in West Seneca, New York.

Mason was a three-year letterman for the Syracuse Orange of Syracuse University from 1992 to 1994. He completed four of eight passes for 47 yards and one touchdown in 1992 while also rushing for 184 yards. In 1993, he recorded seven completions on 17 attempts (41.2%) for 92 yards, and two interceptions while rushing for 58 yards. In 1994, Mason completed 105 of 189 passes (55.6%) for 1,627 yards, ten touchdowns, and seven interceptions, 380 rushing yards, and eight rushing touchdowns.

== Professional career ==
Mason signed with the Oakland Raiders of the National Football League (NFL) after going undrafted in the 1995 NFL draft. He was released by the Raiders on August 22, 1995.

Mason signed with the Saskatchewan Roughriders of the Canadian Football League (CFL) in February 1996. He was released by the Roughriders in June 1998.

Mason was signed by the Winnipeg Blue Bombers of the CFL on July 11, 1998 and released by the team on September 8, 1998.

Mason signed with the Montreal Alouettes of the CFL on October 15, 1998. He spent the rest of the 1998 season on the Alouettes' practice roster. He was released by the Alouettes in April 1999.

Mason was signed by the CFL's Edmonton Eskimos on September 2, 1999. He was released by the Eskimos on November 20, 1999.

Mason played five seasons with the Buffalo Destroyers of the Arena Football League (AFL) from 1999 to 2003. He played quarterback in addition to wide receiver and linebacker.

Mason signed with the Philadelphia Soul of the AFL on December 9, 2003. He was released by the Soul on January 24, 2004.

Mason played for the Canton Legends from 2005 to 2008, winning the American Indoor Football League championship in 2006.

Mason signed with the Erie RiverRats in May 2009.
