= Jimmy Kemp =

American football player (born 1971)

No. 14, 15
- Position: Quarterback

Personal information
- Born: June 27, 1971 (age 55); Buffalo, New York, U.S.
- Listed height: 6 ft 0 in (1.83 m)
- Listed weight: 198 lb (90 kg)

Career information
- College: Wake Forest

Career history
- 1994: Sacramento Gold Miners
- 1995: San Antonio Texans
- 1996: Saskatchewan Roughriders
- 1996: Montreal Alouettes
- 1997–1998: Edmonton Eskimos
- 1999–2001: Toronto Argonauts

James Paul Kemp (born June 27, 1971) is the president of the Jack Kemp Foundation, the executive vice president of Group 47 and a former CFL quarterback. He is the brother of former NFL quarterback Jeff Kemp and the son of American Football League Most Valuable Player and U.S. Representative Jack Kemp.

== Football career ==
After a successful career at Maryland's Winston Churchill High School, he played sparingly in his first two seasons at Wake Forest University (including one as a Redshirt) before becoming the team's starter during his senior year. After graduating, he was signed by the Sacramento Gold Miners of the Canadian Football League. He was the team's third-string quarterback behind David Archer and Kerwin Bell before moving up to second string when Bell left for the Edmonton Eskimos before the 1995 season. He got his first start on July 26, 1995, for the now San Antonio Texans when starter David Archer went down. He competed with former Buffalo Bills and Tampa Bay Buccaneers starting quarterback Joe Ferguson for playing time until Archer returned in late August. In 1996, he split his time campaigning with his dad, who was the Republican Party Vice Presidential nominee and playing football. In 1998, he again replaced David Archer as starter, this time with the Edmonton Eskimos. He split the Toronto Argonauts starting quarterback position with Kerwin Bell during the 2000 and 2001 CFL seasons before missing the entire 2002 season due to a contract holdout after the Argonauts refused to pay his moving expenses.

== Professional life ==
Kemp is president of the Jack Kemp Foundation, which he established in 2009.

Kemp co-founded and is the managing partner of Kemp Partners, a strategic consulting firm based in Washington, D.C. Established in 2002, Kemp Partners provides government relations and corporate affairs services to a diverse clientele. Kemp has represented Fortune 500 companies as well as burgeoning firms before Congress, the White House and several federal agencies.

He is also executive vice president of Group 47, a digital data storage company which is bringing to market a new archival media called DOTS (Digital Optical Technology System). DOTS enables digital files to be stored in easily readable form for over 100 years, even under conditions of benign neglect.

Kemp was the founding board chairman for Hope Community Charter School, located in northeast Washington, D.C. The school serves 735 pre-k through grade 8 students and has been operating since September 2005. Kemp is a graduate of Wake Forest University. He and his wife, Susan, have four boys and reside in Washington, D.C.
