= Warren Jones (Canadian football) =

American gridiron football player (born 1966)

Profile
- Position: Quarterback

Personal information
- Born: September 23, 1966 (age 60); Dallas, Texas, U.S.
- Listed height: 6 ft 2 in (1.88 m)
- Listed weight: 200 lb (91 kg)

Career information
- High school: Wilmer-Hutchins (TX)
- College: Hawaii

Career history
- 1989–1991, 1996: Edmonton Eskimos
- 1992–1996: Saskatchewan Roughriders

Warren Jones (born 23 September 1966) is an American former professional football quarterback in the Canadian Football League (CFL), where he played from 1989 to 1996 for two teams. Jones played college football at the University of Hawaii.
