= 1996 CFL season =

Canadian Football League season

- Duration: June 23 – November 3, 1996
- East champions: Toronto Argonauts
- West champions: Edmonton Eskimos

84th Grey Cup
- Date: November 24, 1996
- Venue: Ivor Wynne Stadium, Hamilton
- Champions: Toronto Argonauts

CFL seasons
- ← 1995 1997 →

Canadian Football League team locations: West, East

The 1996 CFL season is considered to be the 43rd season in modern-day Canadian football, although it is officially the 39th Canadian Football League season.

== CFL news in 1996 ==
At the CFL's Board of Governors Meetings in February 1996, it was decided to end the league's four-year American experiment.

The Shreveport Pirates had already disbanded; the league folded the Memphis Mad Dogs and rejected a sale and relocation plan that would have allowed the Birmingham Barracudas to move to Shreveport and survive, forcing that team's closure as well. The Grey Cup champion Baltimore Stallions had opted to move elsewhere rather than face the daunting prospect of competing with the NFL's Baltimore Ravens. When it was apparent the CFL was refocusing on Canada, Stallions owner Jim Speros gave up the Stallions franchise and moved his organisation to Montreal as the third iteration of the Montreal Alouettes. Up until this time, the city of Montreal had been without Canadian football for nine seasons. Speros revived the Als' traditional colour scheme of blue, white, and red. Their logo was an angry bird running with a football; it was their helmet logo until 2019. Unwilling to continue as the lone American team in the league, the San Antonio Texans voluntarily folded.

A dispersal draft was held for the players on four of the five American teams—all except the Stallions. However, all of the Stallions players were released from their contracts. Alouettes general manager Jim Popp, who followed the Stallions organisation to Montreal, managed to re-sign many of them; he was limited to half of the Alouettes roster, since the Stallions as an American team were not subject to the league's requirement that half of a team's roster comprise Canadian citizens, and the Alouettes would be subject to that rule. To stock the roster with Canadians, a special expansion draft, in which only the Canadian citizens on each other team's roster were subject, was held to stock the Alouettes' roster.

With the removal of the American teams, the CFL reverted to its traditional "East-West" alignment. The revived Alouettes were placed in the East Division and the Winnipeg Blue Bombers were placed back into the West Division, after 10 seasons.

The BC Lions and the Calgary Stampeders underwent ownership changes.

== Regular season standings ==
=== Final regular season standings ===
West Division
Pos	Team	Pld	W	L	PF	PA	PD	Pts
1	Calgary Stampeders (C, Q)	18	13	5	608	375	+233	26
2	Edmonton Eskimos (Q)	18	11	7	459	354	+105	22
3	Winnipeg Blue Bombers (Q)	18	9	9	421	495	−74	18
4	BC Lions	18	5	13	410	483	−73	10
5	Saskatchewan Roughriders	18	5	13	360	498	−138	10

Source: "CFL.ca". Archived from the original on July 29, 2009.
(C) First round bye; (Q) Qualified for playoffs

East Division
Pos	Team	Pld	W	L	PF	PA	PD	Pts
1	Toronto Argonauts (C, Q)	18	15	3	556	359	+197	30
2	Montreal Alouettes (Q)	18	12	6	536	467	+69	24
3	Hamilton Tiger-Cats (Q)	18	8	10	426	576	−150	16
4	Ottawa Rough Riders	18	3	15	352	524	−172	6

Source: "CFL.ca". Archived from the original on July 29, 2009.
(C) First round bye; (Q) Qualified for playoffs

Calgary and Toronto both have first round byes.

== Grey Cup playoffs ==
The Toronto Argonauts are the 1996 Grey Cup champions, defeating the Edmonton Eskimos 43–37, at Hamilton's Ivor Wynne Stadium. The Argonauts' Doug Flutie (QB) was named the Grey Cup's Most Valuable Player and Mike Vanderjagt (K) was the Grey Cup's Most Valuable Canadian.

=== Playoff bracket ===
November 9 & 10: Division Semifinals
East
E3	Hamilton Tiger-Cats	11
E2	Montreal Alouettes	22
West
W3	Winnipeg Blue Bombers	7
W2	Edmonton Eskimos	68

November 16 & 17: Division Finals
E2	Montreal Alouettes	7
E1	Toronto Argonauts	43
W2	Edmonton Eskimos	15
W1	Calgary Stampeders	12

November 24: 84th Grey Cup @ Ivor Wynne Stadium – Hamilton, ON
E1	Toronto Argonauts	43
W2	Edmonton Eskimos	37

== CFL leaders ==
- CFL passing leaders
- CFL rushing leaders
- CFL receiving leaders

== 1996 CFL All-Stars ==
=== Offence ===
- QB – Doug Flutie, Toronto Argonauts
- FB – Robert Drummond, Toronto Argonauts
- RB – Robert Mimbs, Saskatchewan Roughriders
- SB – Michael Soles, Montreal Alouettes
- SB – Darren Flutie, Edmonton Eskimos
- WR – Joseph Rogers, Ottawa Rough Riders
- WR – Eddie Brown, Edmonton Eskimos
- C – Mike Kiselak, Toronto Argonauts
- OG – Rocco Romano, Calgary Stampeders
- OG – Leo Groenewegen, Edmonton Eskimos
- OT – Chris Perez, Toronto Argonauts
- OT – Fred Childress, Calgary Stampeders

=== Defence ===
- DT – Rob Waldrop, Toronto Argonauts
- DT – Bennie Goods, Edmonton Eskimos
- DE – Malvin Hunter, Edmonton Eskimos
- DE – Grant Carter, Montreal Alouettes
- LB – Tracy Gravely, Montreal Alouettes
- LB – Willie Pless, Edmonton Eskimos
- LB – K. D. Williams, Winnipeg Blue Bombers
- CB – Al Jordan, Calgary Stampeders
- CB – Marvin Coleman, Calgary Stampeders
- DB – Glenn Rogers Jr., Edmonton Eskimos
- DB – Charles Gordon, Montreal Alouettes
- DS – Trent Brown, Edmonton Eskimos

=== Special teams ===
- P – Paul Osbaldiston, Hamilton Tiger-Cats
- K – Mark McLoughlin, Calgary Stampeders
- ST – Jimmy Cunningham, Toronto Argonauts

== 1996 Western All-Stars ==
=== Offence ===
- QB – Jeff Garcia, Calgary Stampeders
- FB – Sean Millington, BC Lions
- RB – Robert Mimbs, Saskatchewan Roughriders
- SB – Allen Pitts, Calgary Stampeders
- SB – Darren Flutie, Edmonton Eskimos
- WR – Terry Vaughn, Calgary Stampeders
- WR – Eddie Brown, Edmonton Eskimos
- C – Rod Connop, Edmonton Eskimos
- OG – Rocco Romano, Calgary Stampeders
- OG – Leo Groenewegen, Edmonton Eskimos
- OT – Chris Walby, Winnipeg Blue Bombers
- OT – Fred Childress, Calgary Stampeders

=== Defence ===
- DT – Rodney Harding, Calgary Stampeders
- DT – Bennie Goods, Edmonton Eskimos
- DE – Malvin Hunter, Edmonton Eskimos
- DE – Leroy Blugh, Edmonton Eskimos
- LB – Angelo Snipes, Winnipeg Blue Bombers
- LB – Willie Pless, Edmonton Eskimos
- LB – K. D. Williams, Winnipeg Blue Bombers
- CB – Al Jordan, Calgary Stampeders
- CB – Marvin Coleman, Calgary Stampeders
- DB – Glenn Rogers Jr., Edmonton Eskimos
- DB – Andre Strode, BC Lions
- DS – Trent Brown, Edmonton Eskimos

=== Special teams ===
- P – Tony Martino, Calgary Stampeders
- K – Mark McLoughlin, Calgary Stampeders
- ST – Marvin Coleman, Calgary Stampeders

== 1996 Eastern All-Stars ==
=== Offence ===
- QB – Doug Flutie, Toronto Argonauts
- FB – Robert Drummond, Toronto Argonauts
- RB – Mike Pringle, Montreal Alouettes
- SB – Mac Cody, Hamilton Tiger-Cats
- SB – Jock Climie, Montreal Alouettes
- WR – Joseph Rogers, Ottawa Rough Riders
- WR – Paul Masotti, Toronto Argonauts
- C – Mike Kiselak, Toronto Argonauts
- OG – Bruce Beaton, Montreal Alouettes
- OG – Blaine Schmidt, Hamilton Tiger-Cats
- OT – Chris Perez, Toronto Argonauts
- OT – Neal Fort, Montreal Alouettes

=== Defence ===
- DT – Rob Waldrop, Toronto Argonauts
- DT – Mike Philbrick, Hamilton Tiger-Cats
- DE – Reggie Givens, Toronto Argonauts
- DE – Grant Carter, Montreal Alouettes
- LB – Tracy Gravely, Montreal Alouettes
- LB – Paul Randolph, Montreal Alouettes
- LB – Lamar McGriggs, Ottawa Rough Riders
- CB – Irvin Smith, Montreal Alouettes
- CB – Adrion Smith, Toronto Argonauts
- DB – Kenny Wilhite, Ottawa Rough Riders
- DB – Charles Gordon, Montreal Alouettes
- DS – Spencer McLennan, Montreal Alouettes

=== Special teams ===
- P – Paul Osbaldiston, Hamilton Tiger-Cats
- K – Terry Baker, Montreal Alouettes
- ST – Jimmy Cunningham, Toronto Argonauts

== 1996 Intergold CFLPA All-Stars ==
=== Offence ===
- QB – Doug Flutie, Toronto Argonauts
- OT – Chris Perez, Toronto Argonauts
- OT – Mark Dixon, Montreal Alouettes
- OG – Rocco Romano, Calgary Stampeders
- OG – Jamie Taras, BC Lions
- C – Mike Kiselak, Toronto Argonauts
- RB – Rob Mimbs, Saskatchewan Roughriders
- FB – Tony Burse, Edmonton Eskimos
- SB – Maclin Cody, Hamilton Tiger-Cats
- SB – Darren Flutie, Edmonton Eskimos
- WR – Curtis Mayfield, Saskatchewan Roughriders
- WR – Terry Vaughn, Calgary Stampeders

=== Defence ===
- DE – Grant Carter, Montreal Alouettes
- DE – Leroy Blugh, Edmonton Eskimos
- DT – John Kropke, Winnipeg Blue Bombers
- DT – Rob Waldrop, Toronto Argonauts
- OLB – Angelo Snipes, Winnipeg Blue Bombers
- OLB – K. D. Williams, Winnipeg Blue Bombers
- ILB – Willie Pless, Edmonton Eskimos
- CB – Donald Smith, Toronto Argonauts
- CB – Marvin Coleman, Calgary Stampeders
- HB – Glenn Rogers Jr., Edmonton Eskimos
- HB – Charles Gordon, Montreal Alouettes
- S – Greg Knox, Calgary Stampeders

=== Special teams ===
- K – Mark McLoughlin, Calgary Stampeders
- P – Paul Osbaldiston, Hamilton Tiger-Cats
- ST – Jimmy Cunningham, Toronto Argonauts

=== Head coach ===
- Don Matthews, Toronto Argonauts

== 1996 CFL awards ==
- CFL's Most Outstanding Player Award – Doug Flutie (QB), Toronto Argonauts
- CFL's Most Outstanding Canadian Award – Leroy Blugh (DE), Edmonton Eskimos
- CFL's Most Outstanding Defensive Player Award – Willie Pless (LB), Edmonton Eskimos
- CFL's Most Outstanding Offensive Lineman Award – Mike Kiselak (C), Toronto Argonauts
- CFL's Most Outstanding Rookie Award – Kelvin Anderson (RB), Calgary Stampeders
- CFLPA's Outstanding Community Service Award – Mike "Pinball" Clemons (RB), Toronto Argonauts
- CFL's Coach of the Year – Ron Lancaster, Edmonton Eskimos
- Commissioner's Award - John Tory, Toronto
