= 1996 Montreal Alouettes season =

Canadian football team season

- Owner: Jim Speros
- General manager: Jim Popp
- Head coach: Bob Price
- Home stadium: Olympic Stadium

Results
- Record: 12–6
- Division place: 2nd, East
- Playoffs: Lost East Final

Uniform

The 1996 Montreal Alouettes finished in second place in the East Division with a 12–6 record in the franchise's first full season in the Canadian Football League since 1986. Unlike the lean years from 1981 to 1986, the revived Alouettes were going to be competitive, especially since most of them had won the Grey Cup in the previous season as the Baltimore Stallions. They had several offensive players from that team, such as Tracy Ham, Mike Pringle, kick returner Chris Wright, slotback Chris Armstrong, and two notable defensive players in Irvin Smith and Elfrid Payton. After a slow start they rebounded to finish strong and after defeating the Hamilton Tiger-Cats, they traveled to Toronto, where they were defeated in the East Final by the eventual Grey Cup champions, the Toronto Argonauts.

== Offseason ==
=== Start of a new franchise ===
Starting in the 1993 CFL season, the league began expanding into the United States with hopes of boosting revenues and saw five US-based teams in 1995, including the dominant Baltimore Stallions. Prior to the 1996 NFL season, Cleveland Browns owner Art Modell, announced his intentions to move the Browns to Baltimore (to be reborn as the Ravens, meaning there would be two professional football teams in the city. Stallions owner Jim Speros realized that the Stallions could not realistically compete with an NFL team and decided to move the team elsewhere. He looked into moving the team to Houston, Texas (which would lose their NFL team, the Oilers by the end of that same year), but after a deal could not be resolved, he decided to move the team to Montreal as the third (and current) incarnation of the Alouettes.

Stallions General Manager Jim Popp came with Speros to Montreal, but he had to build the team from scratch since the CFL did not allow the team to retain its Baltimore legacy. It was, however, allowed to reclaim the history and records of the old 1946–86 Alouettes (and the Concordes from 1982 to 1985). According to official CFL records, Speros is reckoned as having canceled the Stallions' franchise and reactivated the dormant Alouettes franchise. The Alouettes are now reckoned as having suspended operations from 1987 to 1995.

While all Baltimore players were released from their contracts, Popp was able to resign future Canadian Football Hall of Fame quarterback Tracy Ham and future Hall of Fame running back Mike Pringle, who would go on to become the CFL's all-time leading rusher. Both Ham and Pringle, along with other former Baltimore players re-signed by Popp, would play large roles in the success of the reborn team. The new Alouettes played their first regular season game on June 27, 1996; almost ten years since their last game in the city of Montreal.

=== 1996 CFL draft ===
Round	Pick	Player	Position	School/Club team
1	9	Denis Montana	WR	Concordia University
2	18	Bryan Chiu	DT	Washington State
3	27	Adam Cassidy	OL	Alberta
4	36	Tom Hipsz	DE	Toronto
6	53	Adrian Rainbow	QB	British Columbia
7	62	Marc Charles	DT	Morgan State

=== 1996 CFL expansion draft ===
Name	Position	Team
Spencer McLennan	Safety	BC Lions
Bruce Beaton	Tackle	Calgary Stampeders
John Kalin	Safety	Edmonton Eskimos
Hency Charles	Linebacker	Edmonton Eskimos
Lee Knight	Fullback	Hamilton Tiger-Cats
Nigel Williams	Receiver	Ottawa Rough Riders
Stefen Reid	Linebacker	Ottawa Rough Riders
Bruce Boyko	Fullback	Saskatchewan Roughriders
Jock Climie	Slotback	Toronto Argonauts
Terry Baker	Kicker/Punter	Toronto Argonauts
Allan Boyko	Receiver	Winnipeg Blue Bombers

== Preseason ==
Game	Date	Opponent	Results		Venue	Attendance
Game	Date	Opponent	Score	Record	Venue	Attendance
A	June 13	vs. Ottawa Rough Riders	W 38–7	1–0	Olympic Stadium	11,215
B	June 20	at Hamilton Tiger-Cats	W 43–39	2–0	Ivor Wynne Stadium	16,346

== Regular season ==
=== Season standings ===
East Division
Pos	Team	Pld	W	L	PF	PA	PD	Pts
1	Toronto Argonauts (C, Q)	18	15	3	556	359	+197	30
2	Montreal Alouettes (Q)	18	12	6	536	467	+69	24
3	Hamilton Tiger-Cats (Q)	18	8	10	426	576	−150	16
4	Ottawa Rough Riders (Q)	18	3	15	352	524	−172	6

Source: "CFL.ca". Archived from the original on 2009-07-29.
(C) First round bye; (Q) Qualified for playoffs

=== Season schedule ===
Week	Game	Date	Opponent	Results		Venue	Attendance
Week	Game	Date	Opponent	Score	Record	Venue	Attendance
1	1	June 27	vs. Toronto Argonauts	L 24–27	0–1	Olympic Stadium	24,653
2	2	July 5	at Edmonton Eskimos	L 13–16	0–2	Commonwealth Stadium	26,211
3	3	July 10	vs. Calgary Stampeders	L 22–62	0–3	Olympic Stadium	19,362
4	4	July 19	at BC Lions	W 44–24	1–3	BC Place Stadium	21,855
5	5	July 24	vs. Winnipeg Blue Bombers	W 36–10	2–3	Olympic Stadium	20,302
6	6	Aug 1	at Toronto Argonauts	L 31–40	2–4	SkyDome	20,302
7	7	Aug 7	vs. Hamilton Tiger-Cats	W 29–22	3–4	Olympic Stadium	25,210
7	8	Aug 11	at Saskatchewan Roughriders	W 32–20	4–4	Taylor Field	21,997
8	8	Bye					
9	9	Aug 23	vs. Saskatchewan Roughriders	W 23–16	5–4	Olympic Stadium	26,511
10	10	Aug 30	at Ottawa Rough Riders	L 6–17	5–5	Frank Clair Stadium	28,451
11	11	Sept 7	vs. BC Lions	W 28–27	6–5	Olympic Stadium	15,161
12	12	Sept 13	at Calgary Stampeders	W 25–23	7–5	McMahon Stadium	19,196
13	Bye						
14	13	Sept 29	at Hamilton Tiger-Cats	L 38–39	7–6	Ivor Wynne Stadium	17,740
15	14	Oct 4	vs. Edmonton Eskimos	W 32–18	8–6	Olympic Stadium	17,886
16	15	Oct 14	at Ottawa Rough Riders	W 25–18	9–6	Frank Clair Stadium	14,080
17	16	Oct 19	vs. Ottawa Rough Riders	W 28–21	10–6	Olympic Stadium	18,671
18	17	Oct 25	vs. Hamilton Tiger-Cats	W 45–41	11–6	Olympic Stadium	20,231
19	18	Nov 1	at Winnipeg Blue Bombers	W 42–24	12–6	Winnipeg Stadium	25,968

== Roster ==
1996 Montreal Alouettes final roster
Quarterbacks: 9 Dan Crowley; 8 Tracy Ham; Running backs: 29 Louis Fite; 27 Mike Pringle; 22 Michael Soles; 39 Alan Wetmore; Receivers: 81 Chris Armstrong; 82 Jock Climie; 87 Joey Jauch; 80 Denis Montana; 88 Nigel Williams	Offensive linemen: 62 Bruce Beaton T; 64 Mark Dixon G; 66 Neal Fort T; 69 Mike Jovanovich T; 65 Mike Sutherland C; 65 Mike Withycombe G; Defensive linemen: 54 Grant Carter DE; 50 Rahsaan Giddings DE; 56 Elfrid Payton DE; 94 Doug Petersen DT; Special teams: 10 Terry Baker K/P	Linebackers: 14 Jason Bryant; 7 Tracy Gravely; 36 Paul Randolph; 47 Stefen Reid; Defensive backs: 6 Hency Charles; 17 Doug Craft; 5 Anthony Drawhorn; 25 Charles Gordon; 19 John Kalin; 16 Spencer McLennan; 37 Dwayne Provo; 21 Irvin Smith; 33 Ken Watson	Injured list: 31 Hurlie Brown LB; 1 Dexter Dawson WR; 90 Brian Forde DE; 4 Tommie Frazier QB; 3 Gary Harrell WR; 58 Michel Lamy G; 55 Quinn Magnuson G; 0 Harold Nash DB; 67 Matthieu Quiviger T; 51 Nick Subis C; 53 Chris Tsangaris LB; 28 Chris Wright RB; Italics indicate International player

== Playoffs ==
=== East Semi-Final ===
Team	Q1	Q2	Q3	Q4	Total
Hamilton Tiger-Cats	3	1	7	0	11
Montreal Alouettes	4	3	7	8	22

=== East Final ===
Team	Q1	Q2	Q3	Q4	Total
Montreal Alouettes	0	0	0	7	7
Toronto Argonauts	12	14	10	7	43

== Awards ==
=== 1996 CFL All-Star Selections ===
- Grant Carter – Defensive End
- Charles Gordon – Defensive Back
- Tracy Gravely – Linebacker

=== 1996 CFL East All-Star Selections ===
- Terry Baker – Placekicker
- Bruce Beaton – Offensive Guard
- Grant Carter – Defensive End
- Jock Climie – Slotback
- Neal Fort – Offensive Tackle
- Charles Gordon – Defensive Back
- Tracy Gravely – Linebacker
- Spencer McLennan – Defensive Safety
- Mike Pringle – Running Back
- Paul Randolph – Linebacker
- Irvin Smith – Cornerback
