= 1996 Toronto Argonauts season =

CFL team season

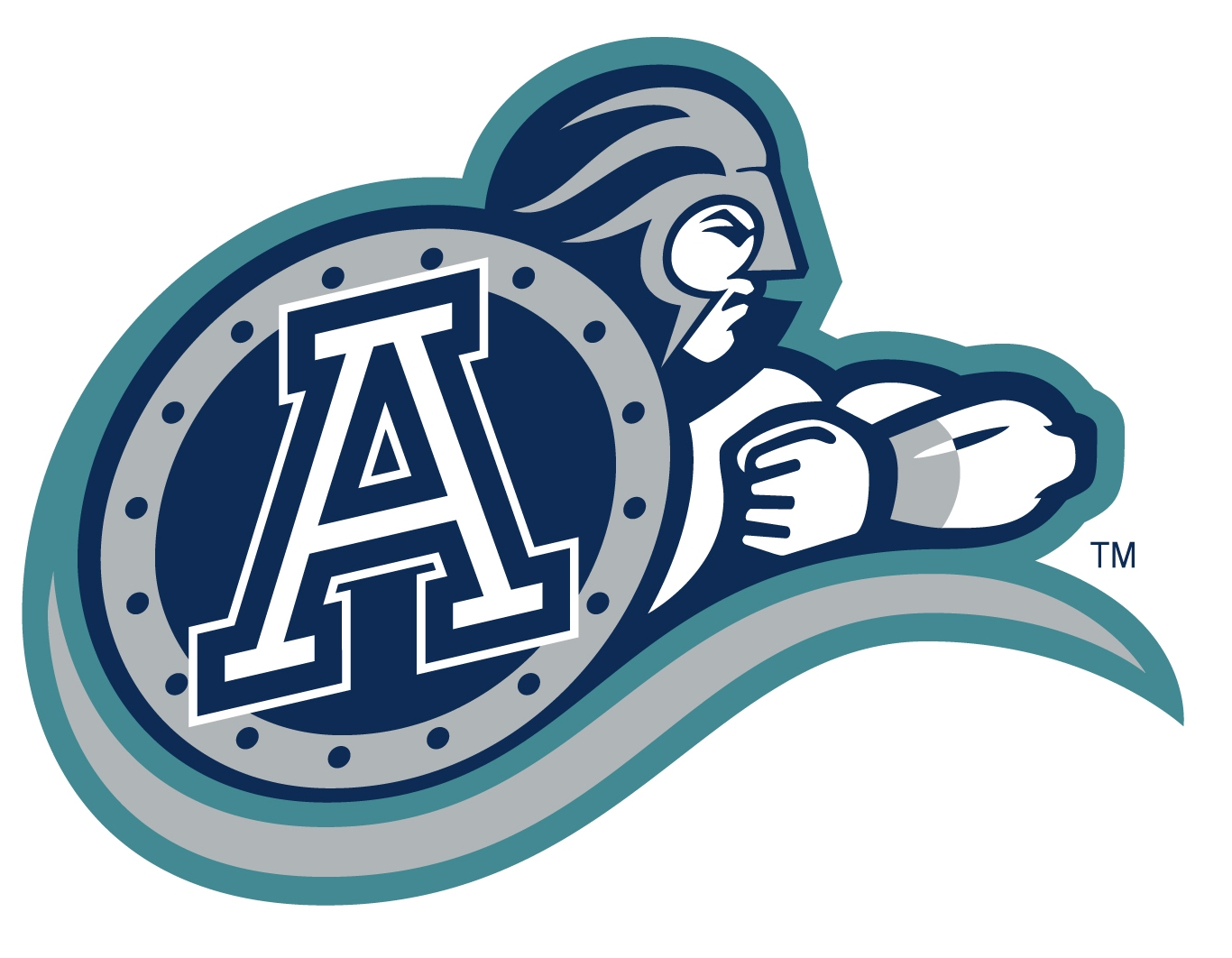
- Head coach: Don Matthews
- Home stadium: SkyDome

Results
- Record: 15–3
- Division place: 1st, East
- Playoffs: Won Grey Cup

The 1996 Toronto Argonauts season was the 107th season for the team since the franchise's inception in 1873. The team finished in first place in the East Division with a 15–3 record and qualified for the playoffs after missing out during the previous season when they finished 4–14. The 11-win improvement was the greatest single-season turnaround in franchise history. Furthermore, the team's 15 regular season wins was the most ever recorded by an Argonaut team until it was surpassed by the 2023 squad 27 years later, which finishing their season with a 16–2 record.

In the playoffs, the Argonauts defeated the newly relocated Montreal Alouettes in the Eastern Final and qualified for the 84th Grey Cup. Toronto defeated the Edmonton Eskimos by a score of 43–37, the second highest scoring Grey Cup game in history, and won their 13th Grey Cup championship.

== Offseason ==
=== CFL draft ===
Round	Pick	Player	Position	School
1	2	Kelly Wiltshire	CB	James Madison
3	20	L.J. Eiben	WR	Humboldt State
4	36	Tom Hipsz	DE	Toronto
6	46	Tim Biakabutuka	RB	Michigan
7	55	Craig Poole	WR	Windsor

=== Preseason ===
Game	Date	Opponent	Results		Venue	Attendance
Game	Date	Opponent	Score	Record	Venue	Attendance
A	June 13	vs. Hamilton Tiger-Cats	L 27–37 (OT)	0–1	SkyDome	13,247
B	June 19	at Ottawa Rough Riders	W 34–6	1–1	Frank Clair Stadium	14,024

== Regular season ==
=== Season standings ===
East Division
Pos	Team	Pld	W	L	PF	PA	PD	Pts
1	Toronto Argonauts (C, Q)	18	15	3	556	359	+197	30
2	Montreal Alouettes (Q)	18	12	6	536	467	+69	24
3	Hamilton Tiger-Cats (Q)	18	8	10	426	576	−150	16
4	Ottawa Rough Riders	18	3	15	352	524	−172	6

Source: "CFL.ca". Archived from the original on 2009-07-29.
(C) First round bye; (Q) Qualified for playoffs

=== Regular season ===
Week	Game	Date	Opponent	Results		Venue	Attendance
Week	Game	Date	Opponent	Score	Record	Venue	Attendance
1	1	June 27	at Montreal Alouettes	W 27–24	1–0	Olympic Stadium	24,653
2	2	July 4	vs. Hamilton Tiger-Cats	L 36–38	1–1	SkyDome	26,333
3	3	July 11	at Winnipeg Blue Bombers	W 35–14	2–1	Winnipeg Stadium	24,882
4	4	July 17	vs. Ottawa Rough Riders	W 34–4	3–1	SkyDome	17,288
5	5	July 26	at Saskatchewan Roughriders	W 40–16	4–1	Taylor Field	24,902
6	6	Aug 1	vs. Montreal Alouettes	W 40–31	5–1	SkyDome	20,302
7	7	Aug 8	vs. Edmonton Eskimos	W 24–21	6–1	SkyDome	20,030
8	8	Aug 15	at Ottawa Rough Riders	W 42–19	7–1	Frank Clair Stadium	15,220
9	9	Aug 24	vs. Ottawa Rough Riders	W 28–21	8–1	SkyDome	17,186
10	10	Sept 2	at Hamilton Tiger-Cats	W 38–7	9–1	Ivor Wynne Stadium	27,517
11	11	Sept 8	vs. Saskatchewan Roughriders	W 31–13	10–1	SkyDome	17,576
12	12	Sept 14	at BC Lions	L 11–35	10–2	BC Place	15,323
13	13	Sept 21	vs. Calgary Stampeders	W 23–22	11–2	SkyDome	27,209
14	Bye						
15	14	Oct 5	vs. Winnipeg Blue Bombers	W 28–12	12–2	SkyDome	17,310
16	15	Oct 14	at Calgary Stampeders	L 23–30	12–3	McMahon Stadium	27,436
17	16	Oct 20	at Edmonton Eskimos	W 24–17	13–3	Commonwealth Stadium	27,567
18	17	Oct 27	vs. BC Lions	W 25–21	14–3	SkyDome	20,657
19	18	Nov 2	at Hamilton Tiger-Cats	W 47–14	15–3	Ivor Wynne Stadium	23,001

== Postseason ==
Game	Date	Opponent	Results		Venue	Attendance
Game	Date	Opponent	Score	Record	Venue	Attendance
East Final	Sun, Nov 17	vs. Montreal Alouettes	W 43–7	1–0	SkyDome	28,390
Grey Cup	Sun, Nov 24	vs. Edmonton Eskimos	W 43–37	2–0	Ivor Wynne Stadium	38,595

== Roster ==
1996 Toronto Argonauts final roster
Quarterbacks: 14 Marquel Fleetwood; 2 Doug Flutie; Running backs: 31 Michael Clemons; 29 Robert Drummond; Receivers: 80 Norm Casola; 86 Jimmy Cunningham; 28 Duane Dmytryshyn; 15 J. P. Izquierdo; 88 Paul Masotti; 78 Mike Morreale; 81 Tyrone Williams	Offensive linemen: 58 Chris Gioskos G; 63 Mike Kiselak C; 57 Dan Payne G/T; 62 Chris Perez T; 65 Vic Stevenson T; 59 Pierre Vercheval G; Defensive linemen: 51 Noah Cantor DT; 56 Tim Cofield DE; 94 Oscar Giles DE/DT; 91 Demetrious Maxie DE; 61 John Raposo DE; 73 Andrew Stewart DE; 92 Rob Waldrop DT	Linebackers: 37 Ken Benson; 38 Reggie Givens; 39 Cooper Harris; 7 Johnnie Harris; 50 Mike O'Shea; Defensive backs: 4 Ed Berry; 21 George Nimako; 9 Marcello Simmons; 12 Adrion Smith; 19 Donald Smith; 36 Les Smith; 20 Don Wilson	Special teams: 13 Mike Vanderjagt K/P; Injured list: 18 Jeff Fairholm SB; 96 Alex Gordon DE; 35 Brendan Rogers LB; Italics indicate International player

== Awards and records ==
- Doug Flutie, Most Outstanding Player Award
- Doug Flutie, Terry Evanshen Trophy
- Mike Kiselak, Outstanding Offensive Lineman

=== 1996 CFL All-Stars ===
- QB – Doug Flutie
- FB – Robert Drummond
- C – Mike Kiselak
- OT – Chris Perez
- DT – Rob Waldrop
- ST – Jimmy Cunningham

WR- Terrance Lawrence
