= 1996 CFL dispersal draft =

Canadian football draft of former american teams

Following the collapse of the CFL's American teams after the 1995 CFL season, a dispersal draft was held on 7 March 1996. 121 players from the Memphis Mad Dogs, Birmingham Barracudas, San Antonio Texans and Shreveport Pirates were dispersed among the nine remaining teams over 16 rounds.

== Round one ==
Pick #	Player	Position	Drafted from	Drafted by
1	David Archer	QB	San Antonio Texans	Ottawa Rough Riders
2	Alex Gordon	DE	Memphis Mad Dogs	Toronto Argonauts
3	Curtis Mayfield	WR	Shreveport Pirates	Saskatchewan Roughriders
4	Angelo Snipes	LB	Birmingham Barracudas	Winnipeg Blue Bombers
5	Marcus Grant	WR	Birmingham Barracudas	Hamilton Tiger Cats
6	Brandon Hamilton	CB	Shreveport Pirates	BC Lions
7	Al Shipman	RB	Memphis Mad Dogs	Edmonton Eskimos
8	Rodney Harding	DT	Memphis Mad Dogs	Calgary Stampeders
9	Mike Saunders	RB	San Antonio Texans	Montreal Alouettes

== Round two ==
Pick #	Player	Position	Drafted from	Drafted by
10	Jason Phillips	WR	Birmingham Barracudas	Hamilton Tiger Cats (via Ottawa)
11	Bobby Dawson	DB	Memphis Mad Dogs	Toronto Argonauts
12	Rod Harris	WR	Shreveport Pirates	Saskatchewan Roughriders
13	Damion Lyons	CB	Memphis Mad Dogs	Winnipeg Blue Bombers
14	Donovan Gans	DE	Birmingham Barracudas	Hamilton Tiger Cats
15	Andre Strode	DB	Birmingham Barracudas	BC Lions
16	Grady Cavness Jr.	DB	San Antonio Texans	Edmonton Eskimos
17	Steve Anderson	DE	Birmingham Barracudas	Calgary Stampeders
18	Greg Battle	LB	Memphis Mad Dogs	Montreal Alouettes

== Round three ==
Pick #	Player	Position	Drafted from	Drafted by
19	Eddie Britton	WR	Birmingham Barracudas	Ottawa Rough Riders
20	Donald Smith	CB	Memphis Mad Dogs	Toronto Argonauts
21	Shont'e Peoples	DE	Birmingham Barracudas	Saskatchewan Roughriders
22	Mike Armstrong	DT	Memphis Mad Dogs	Winnipeg Blue Bombers
23	Kim Phillips	CB	Shreveport Pirates	Hamilton Tiger Cats
24	David Maeva	LB	Memphis Mad Dogs	BC Lions
25	Maurice Miller	LB	San Antonio Texans	Edmonton Eskimos
26	Eddie Davis	QB	Birmingham Barracudas	Calgary Stampeders
27	Jimmy Kemp	QB	San Antonio Texans	Montreal Alouettes

== Round four ==
Pick #	Player	Position	Drafted from	Drafted by
28	Jason Wallace	CB	San Antonio Texans	Ottawa Rough Riders
29	Ed Berry Jr.	CB	Memphis Mad Dogs	Toronto Argonauts
30	Darryl Ford	LB	Memphis Mad Dogs	Saskatchewan Roughriders
31	Mark Stock	WR	San Antonio Texans	Winnipeg Blue Bombers
32	Mac Cody	WR	Birmingham Barracudas	Hamilton Tiger Cats
33	Delius Moore	WR	Birmingham Barracudas	BC Lions
34	Tom Rayam	OL	Birmingham Barracudas	Edmonton Eskimos
35	Travis Cozart	RB	Shreveport Pirates	Calgary Stampeders
36	Norman Bradford	RB	Shreveport Pirates	Montreal Alouettes

== Round five ==
Pick #	Player	Position	Drafted from	Drafted by
37	Chris Zingo	LB	Shreveport Pirates	Ottawa Rough Riders
38	Chris Perez	OT	Memphis Mad Dogs	Toronto Argonauts
39	Shawn Collins	WR	Memphis Mad Dogs	Saskatchewan Roughriders
40	Freeman Baysinger Jr.	WR	Shreveport Pirates	Winnipeg Blue Bombers
41	Jimmy Reed	LB	Birmingham Barracudas	Hamilton Tiger Cats
42	Fernando Thomas	CB	Birmingham Barracudas	BC Lions
43	Robbie Keen	K	Shreveport Pirates	Edmonton Eskimos
44	Sam Peoples	CB	Birmingham Barracudas	Calgary Stampeders
45	Joe Kralik	WR	San Antonio Texans	Montreal Alouettes

== Round six ==
Pick #	Player	Position	Drafted from	Drafted by
46	Alex Mash	DE	Shreveport Pirates	Ottawa Rough Riders
47	Darrin Mullenburg	OL	San Antonio Texans	Toronto Argonauts
48	Chris Dyko	OT	Birmingham Barracudas	Saskatchewan Roughriders
49	Antony Jordan	RB	Memphis Mad Dogs	Winnipeg Blue Bombers
50	Roosevelt Patterson	OL	Birmingham Barracudas	Hamilton Tiger Cats
51	Johnny Scott	DL	Shreveport Pirates	BC Lions
52	Johnnie Harris	DB	San Antonio Texans	Edmonton Eskimos
53	Schredrick Austin	WR	Birmingham Barracudas	Calgary Stampeders
54	Mario Perry	LB	Shreveport Pirates	Montreal Alouettes

== Round seven ==
Pick #	Player	Position	Drafted from	Drafted by
55	Billy Hess	WR	San Antonio Texans	Ottawa Rough Riders
56	Jami Anderson	LB	Memphis Mad Dogs	Toronto Argonauts
57	Mark Ledbetter	DL	Birmingham Barracudas	Saskatchewan Roughriders
58	Eddie Fuller	RB	San Antonio Texans	Winnipeg Blue Bombers
59	Quenton King	DB	Shreveport Pirates	Hamilton Tiger Cats
60	Fred Montgomery	WR	Shreveport Pirates	BC Lions
61	Chuck Frank	DB	San Antonio Texans	Edmonton Eskimos
62	Vance Hammond	OL	Memphis Mad Dogs	Calgary Stampeders
63	Hurlie Brown	DB	San Antonio Texans	Montreal Alouettes

== Round eight ==
Pick #	Player	Position	Drafted from	Drafted by
64	Marcus Gates	DB	San Antonio Texans	Ottawa Rough Riders
65	Scott Player	P	Birmingham Barracudas	Toronto Argonauts
66	Anthony Drawhorn	DB	Birmingham Barracudas	Saskatchewan Roughriders
67	Bobby Evans	DB	Shreveport Pirates	Winnipeg Blue Bombers
68	Ted Long	WR	Birmingham Barracudas	Hamilton Tiger Cats
69	Mike Jones	LB	Birmingham Barracudas	BC Lions
70	Akaba Delaney	DL	Birmingham Barracudas	Edmonton Eskimos
71	Kelvin Simmons	QB	Birmingham Barracudas	Calgary Stampeders
72	Luis Zendejas	K	Birmingham Barracudas	Montreal Alouettes

== Round nine ==
Pick #	Player	Position	Drafted from	Drafted by
73	Judd Garrett	RB	San Antonio Texans	Ottawa Rough Riders
74	Mike Dingle	RB	Memphis Mad Dogs	Toronto Argonauts
75	Kyle Faulkner	DE	Birmingham Barracudas	Saskatchewan Roughriders
76	Daryle Smith	OT	San Antonio Texans	Winnipeg Blue Bombers
77	Joe Montford	LB	Shreveport Pirates	Hamilton Tiger Cats
78	Tommy Oates	DB	Birmingham Barracudas	BC Lions
79	Bobby Roland	DB	Birmingham Barracudas	Edmonton Eskimos
80	Troy Mills	RB	San Antonio Texans	Calgary Stampeders
81	Rickey Foggie	QB	Memphis Mad Dogs	Montreal Alouettes

== Round ten ==
Pick #	Player	Position	Drafted from	Drafted by
82	Chris Dausin	C	Shreveport Pirates	Ottawa Rough Riders
83	Oscar Giles Jr.	DL	San Antonio Texans	Toronto Argonauts
84	Mike Kiselak	C	San Antonio Texans	Saskatchewan Roughriders
85	Matt Pearson	DE	Shreveport Pirates	Winnipeg Blue Bombers
86	Jim Ward	DT	Memphis Mad Dogs	Hamilton Tiger Cats
87	Reggie Carthon	DB	Shreveport Pirates	BC Lions
88	Steve Henley	LB	Birmingham Barracudas	Edmonton Eskimos
89	Kenyon Ragsdale	LB	Birmingham Barracudas	Calgary Stampeders
90	Tim Walton	LB	San Antonio Texans	Montreal Alouettes

== Round eleven ==
Pick #	Player	Position	Drafted from	Drafted by
91	Will Covington Jr.	WR	Shreveport Pirates	Ottawa Rough Riders
92	Jimmy Lee	WR	San Antonio Texans	Toronto Argonauts
93	Gary Morris	SB	Memphis Mad Dogs	Saskatchewan Roughriders
94	Jamie Redmond	DB	Memphis Mad Dogs	Winnipeg Blue Bombers
95	Junior Smith	RB	Shreveport Pirates	Hamilton Tiger Cats
96	Nick Mystrom	K	Memphis Mad Dogs	BC Lions
97	Pass			Edmonton Eskimos
98	David Lucas	WR	San Antonio Texans	Calgary Stampeders
99	Steve Bates	DE	Memphis Mad Dogs	Montreal Alouettes

== Round twelve ==
Pick #	Player	Position	Drafted from	Drafted by
100	Jeff Neal	OL	Birmingham Barracudas	Ottawa Rough Riders
101	Todd Jones	OG	Memphis Mad Dogs	Toronto Argonauts
102	Gary Anderson	RB	Memphis Mad Dogs	Saskatchewan Roughriders
103	Phil Brown	RB	San Antonio Texans	Winnipeg Blue Bombers
104	Danton Barto	LB	Memphis Mad Dogs	Hamilton Tiger Cats
105	Pass			BC Lions
106	Pass			Edmonton Eskimos
107	Pass			Calgary Stampeders
108	Heath Sherman	RB	San Antonio Texans	Montreal Alouettes

== Round thirteen ==
Pick #	Player	Position	Drafted from	Drafted by
109	Brett Bech	SB	San Antonio Texans	Ottawa Rough Riders
110	Todd Paige	WR	Memphis Mad Dogs	Toronto Argonauts
111	Bruce Perkins	RB	Memphis Mad Dogs	Saskatchewan Roughriders
112	Sean Brantley	DE	Birmingham Barracudas	Winnipeg Blue Bombers
113	Ben Jefferson	OT	Shreveport Pirates	Hamilton Tiger Cats
114	Pass			BC Lions
115	Pass			Edmonton Eskimos
116	Pass			Calgary Stampeders
117	William Kirksey	LB	Birmingham Barracudas	Montreal Alouettes

== Round fourteen ==
Pick #	Player	Position	Drafted from	Drafted by
118	Lance Teichelman	DL	San Antonio Texans	Ottawa Rough Riders
119	John Nee	OL	Memphis Mad Dogs	Toronto Argonauts
120	Walter Wilson	WR	Memphis Mad Dogs	Saskatchewan Roughriders
121	Billy Joe Tolliver	QB	Shreveport Pirates	Winnipeg Blue Bombers
122	Anthony Shelton	DB	Shreveport Pirates	Hamilton Tiger Cats
123	Pass			BC Lions
124	Pass			Edmonton Eskimos
125	Pass			Calgary Stampeders
126	Drew David	RB	Birmingham Barracudas	Montreal Alouettes

== Round fifteen ==
Pick #	Player	Position	Drafted from	Drafted by
127	Prince Wimbley III	SB	Birmingham Barracudas	Ottawa Rough Riders
128	Pass			Toronto Argonauts
129	Mike Stroell	OL	Shreveport Pirates	Saskatchewan Roughriders
130	Pass			Winnipeg Blue Bombers
131	John "Tweet" Martin	RB	Memphis Mad Dogs	Hamilton Tiger Cats
132	Pass			BC Lions
133	Pass			Edmonton Eskimos
134	Pass			Calgary Stampeders
135	Pass			Montreal Alouettes

== Round sixteen ==
Pick #	Players	Position	Drafted from	Drafted by
136	Pass			Ottawa Rough Riders
137	Pass			Toronto Argonauts
138	Keith Woodside	RB	Birmingham Barracudas	Saskatchewan Roughriders
139	Pass			Winnipeg Blue Bombers
140	Will White	DB	Shreveport Pirates	Hamilton Tiger Cats
141	Pass			BC Lions
142	Pass			Edmonton Eskimos
143	Pass			Calgary Stampeders
144	Pass			Montreal Alouettes
