= 1996 Edmonton Eskimos season =

- General manager: Hugh Campbell
- Head coach: Ron Lancaster
- Home stadium: Commonwealth Stadium

Results
- Record: 11–7
- Division place: 2nd, West
- Playoffs: Lost Grey Cup

The 1996 Edmonton Eskimos were coached by Ron Lancaster and finished in second place in the West Division with an 11–7 record. They upset the Calgary Stampeders in the West Final, but lost the Grey Cup to the Toronto Argonauts.

== Offseason ==
=== CFL draft ===
Rd	Pick	Player	Position	School
1	1	Donnavan Blair	SB	Calgary
1	8	Duane Arrindell	OL	Northern Illinois
2	16	Jayson Hamilton	RB	Alberta
3	25	Sheldon Napastuk	DT	Iowa State
4	34	Murray Cunningham	DL	Alberta
5	43	John Saul	DE	Saskatchewan
6	51	Darcy Park	FB	Alberta
7	60	Troy Shwetz	DB	Jamestown College

== Preseason ==
Week	Date	Opponent	Result	Record	Venue	Attendance
B	June 14	at Saskatchewan Roughriders	L 18–23	0–1		25,632
B	June 21	vs. Winnipeg Blue Bombers	L 31–34	0–2		34,091

== Regular season ==
=== Season standings ===
West Division
Pos	Team	Pld	W	L	PF	PA	PD	Pts
1	Calgary Stampeders (C, Q)	18	13	5	608	375	+233	26
2	Edmonton Eskimos (Q)	18	11	7	459	354	+105	22
3	Winnipeg Blue Bombers (Q)	18	9	9	421	495	−74	18
4	Saskatchewan Roughriders (Q)	18	5	13	360	498	−138	10
5	BC Lions	18	5	13	410	483	−73	10

Source: "CFL.ca". Archived from the original on 2009-07-29.
(C) First round bye; (Q) Qualified for playoffs

=== Season schedule ===
Week	Date	Opponent	Result	Record	Venue	Attendance
1	June 27	at BC Lions	W 28–14	1–0		29,435
2	July 5	vs. Montreal Alouettes	W 16–13	2–0		26,211
3	July 10	at Saskatchewan Roughriders	L 24–27	2–1		21,014
4	July 17	vs. Winnipeg Blue Bombers	L 16–27	2–2		28,751
5	July 25	at Ottawa Rough Riders	W 34–18	3–2		13,323
6	Aug 3	vs. Ottawa Rough Riders	W 20–2	4–2		25,773
7	Aug 8	at Toronto Argonauts	L 21–24	4–3		20,030
8	Aug 17	vs. Saskatchewan Roughriders	W 25–8	5–3		36,011
9	Aug 23	vs. Hamilton Tiger-Cats	W 35–8	6–3		27,202
10	Sept 2	at Calgary Stampeders	L 14–35	6–4		35,314
11	Sept 6	vs. Calgary Stampeders	W 20–19	7–4		40,727*
12	Sept 15	at Hamilton Tiger-Cats	L 14–20	7–5		17,301
13	Sept 20	at Winnipeg Blue Bombers	W 41–12	8–5		28,744
14	Sept 29	vs. BC Lions	W 32–12	9–5		28,784
15	Oct 4	at Montreal Alouettes	L 18–32	9–6		17,886
16	Oct 12	at BC Lions	W 34–31	10–6		18,031
17	Oct 20	vs. Toronto Argonauts	L 17–24	10–7		27,567
18	Oct 27	vs. Calgary Stampeders	W 41–32	11–7		27,332
19	Bye					

*

Top attendance in CFL

== Awards and records ==
- CFL's Most Outstanding Canadian Award – Leroy Blugh (DE)
- CFL's Most Outstanding Defensive Player Award – Willie Pless (LB)
- CFL's Coach of the Year – Ron Lancaster

=== Offence ===
- SB – Darren Flutie
- WR – Eddie Brown
- OG – Leo Groenewegen

=== Defence ===
- DT – Bennie Goods
- DE – Malvin Hunter
- LB – Willie Pless
- DB – Glenn Rogers Jr.
- DS – Trent Brown

== 1996 Western All-Stars ==
=== Offence ===
- SB – Darren Flutie
- WR – Eddie Brown
- C – Rod Connop
- OG – Leo Groenewegen

=== Defence ===
- DT – Bennie Goods
- DE – Malvin Hunter
- DE – Leroy Blugh
- LB – Willie Pless
- DB – Glenn Rogers Jr.
- DS – Trent Brown

== Playoffs ==
=== West Semi-Final ===
Team	Q1	Q2	Q3	Q4	Total
Winnipeg Blue Bombers	1	0	0	6	7
Edmonton Eskimos	10	21	15	22	68

=== West Final ===
Team	Q1	Q2	Q3	Q4	Total
Edmonton Eskimos	6	6	0	3	15
Calgary Stampeders	3	3	3	3	12

=== Grey Cup ===
Team	Q1	Q2	Q3	Q4	Total
Toronto Argonauts	0	27	3	13	43
Edmonton Eskimos	9	14	0	14	37

== Roster ==
1996 Edmonton Eskimos final roster
Quarterbacks: 9 Cody Ledbetter; 14 Danny McManus; Running backs: 35 Eric Blount; 34 Tony Burse; 29 Jay Hamilton; Receivers: 20 Don Blair; 4 Eddie Brown; 82 Darren Flutie; 80 Nick Mazzoli; 7 Jim Sandusky; 31 Marc Tobert; 2 Gizmo Williams	Offensive linemen: 67 Rod Connop C; 50 Blake Dermott G/T; 53 Chris Green G; 59 Leo Groenewegen G; 60 Chris Morris T; 55 Tom Rayam T; Defensive linemen: 89 Leroy Blugh DE; 40 Bennie Goods DT; 46 Malvin Hunter DE; 79 Derek MacCready DT; 43 Jed Roberts DE/DT	Linebackers: 36 Bruce Dickson; 38 Errol Martin; 45 Maurice Miller; 39 Willie Pless; Defensive backs: 28 Trent Brown; 10 Malcolm Frank; 4 Darian Hagan; 27 Singor Mobley; 6 Reggie Pleasant; 24 Kavis Reed; 26 Glenn Rogers	Special teams: 3 Sean Fleming K; 18 Glenn Harper P; Injured list: 5 Shalon Baker WR; 17 Derrick Beatty DB; 8 Warren Jones QB; 56 Ed Kucy T; 72 Glen Scrivener DT; 62 Derek Sholdice G; 94 Mike Sellers DE; 47 Larry Wruck LB; Italics indicate International player
