= 1996 Winnipeg Blue Bombers season =

Canadian football team season

- General manager: Cal Murphy
- Head coach: Cal Murphy
- Home stadium: Winnipeg Stadium

Results
- Record: 9–9
- Division place: 3rd, West
- Playoffs: Lost West Semi-Final

Uniform

The 1996 Winnipeg Blue Bombers finished in third place in the West Division with a 9–9 record. They appeared in the West Semi-Final.

== Offseason ==
=== CFL draft ===
| Round | Pick | Player | Position | School |

== Regular season ==
=== Season standings ===
West Division
| Pos | Team | Pld | W | L | PF | PA | PD | Pts |
|---|---|---|---|---|---|---|---|---|
| 1 | Calgary Stampeders (C, Q) | 18 | 13 | 5 | 608 | 375 | +233 | 26 |
| 2 | Edmonton Eskimos (Q) | 18 | 11 | 7 | 459 | 354 | +105 | 22 |
| 3 | Winnipeg Blue Bombers (Q) | 18 | 9 | 9 | 421 | 495 | −74 | 18 |
| 4 | BC Lions | 18 | 5 | 13 | 410 | 483 | −73 | 10 |
| 5 | Saskatchewan Roughriders | 18 | 5 | 13 | 360 | 498 | −138 | 10 |

Source: "CFL.ca". Archived from the original on 2009-07-29.
(C) First round bye; (Q) Qualified for playoffs

=== Season schedule ===
| Week | Date | Opponent | Result | Record |
|---|---|---|---|---|
| 1 | June 29 | at Calgary Stampeders | L 12–39 | 0–1 |
| 2 | July 6 | vs. BC Lions | W 25–22 | 1–1 |
| 3 | July 11 | vs. Toronto Argonauts | L 14–35 | 1–2 |
| 4 | July 17 | at Edmonton Eskimos | W 27–16 | 2–2 |
| 5 | July 24 | at Montreal Alouettes | L 10–36 | 2–3 |
| 6 | July 29 | vs. Calgary Stampeders | W 38–36 | 3–3 |
| 7 | Aug 9 | vs. Ottawa Rough Riders | W 31–27 | 4–3 |
| 8 | Aug 15 | at BC Lions | W 38–13 | 5–3 |
| 9 | Aug 26 | vs. BC Lions | L 20–22 | 5–4 |
| 10 | Sept 1 | at Saskatchewan Roughriders | L 23–41 | 5–5 |
| 11 | Sept 8 | vs. Hamilton Tiger-Cats | W 33–15 | 6–5 |
| 12 | Sept 20 | vs. Edmonton Eskimos | L 12–41 | 6–6 |
| 13 | Sept 28 | at Saskatchewan Roughriders | W 37–15 | 7–6 |
| 14 | Oct 5 | at Toronto Argonauts | L 12–28 | 7–7 |
| 15 | Oct 13 | vs. Saskatchewan Roughriders | W 20–14 | 8–7 |
| 16 | Oct 18 | at Hamilton Tiger-Cats | L 15–25 | 8–8 |
| 17 | Oct 26 | at Ottawa Rough Riders | W 30–29 | 9–8 |
| 18 | Nov 1 | vs. Montreal Alouettes | L 24–42 | 9–9 |

== Playoffs ==
=== West Semi-Final ===
| Team | Q1 | Q2 | Q3 | Q4 | Total |
|---|---|---|---|---|---|
| Winnipeg Blue Bombers | 1 | 0 | 0 | 6 | 7 |
| Edmonton Eskimos | 10 | 21 | 15 | 22 | 68 |

== Roster ==
1996 Winnipeg Blue Bombers final roster
| Quarterbacks: 5 Kent Austin; 10 Reggie Slack; Running backs: 35 Leonard Jean-Pierre; 39 Dean Lytle; 31 Mike Richardson; Receivers: 2 Freeman Baysinger; 17 Allan Boyko; 84 Eric Guliford; 85 Milt Stegall | Offensive linemen: 68 Guy Earle T; 57 Brett MacNeil G; 77 Stan Mikawos T; 69 Bobby Pandelidis G; 43 Kevin Robson C; 60 Dave Vankoughnett C; Defensive linemen: 94 Tony Hill DE; 73 John Kropke DT; 72 Colin Scrivener DT; 70 Harry Van Hofwegan DE; Special teams: 6 Bob Cameron P; 7 Troy Westwood K | Linebackers: 58 Greg Clark; 48 Charlie Clemons; 38 Doug Hocking; 54 Wade Miller; 91 Angelo Snipes; 44 K. D. Williams; Defensive backs: 33 Bobby Evans; 9 Greg Frers; 23 Shannon Garrett; 3 Damion Lyons; 20 Jason Mallett; 13 Gerald Vaughn; 26 Darrius Watson | Injured list: 83 Shannon Baker WR; 21 Blaise Bryant RB; 24 Andrew Henry DB; 15 Kevin McDougal QB; 63 Chris Walby T; 87 Gerald Wilcox SB; 89 Myron Wise SB; Italics indicate International player |

== Awards and records ==
=== 1996 CFL All-Stars ===
- LB – K.D. Williams, CFL All-Star
