= 1996 Ottawa Rough Riders season =

Canadian football team season

- Head coach: Jim Gilstrap (fired); John Payne
- Home stadium: Frank Clair Stadium

Results
- Record: 3–15
- Division place: 4th, East
- Playoffs: did not qualify

Uniform

The 1996 Ottawa Rough Riders finished fourth place in the East Division with a 3–15 record and failed to make the playoffs. This was the final season in Ottawa Rough Riders franchise history as they folded after the season ended. Jim Gilstrap was the coach through the second game of the regular season before being fired and replaced with John Payne for the remainder of the season.

== Offseason ==
=== CFL draft ===
Round	Pick	Player	Position	School
3	19	Sammie Brennan	DB	Bishop's
4	28	Grayson Shillingford	SB	UBC
5	37	Darcy Curtis	DT/OL	Simon Fraser
5	38	George Savard	OL	Ottawa
6	45	Robert McElwain	DB	Windsor
7	54	Micheal Hendricks	LB	Ottawa

=== Preseason ===
Game	Date	Opponent	Results		Venue	Attendance
Game	Date	Opponent	Score	Record	Venue	Attendance
A	Thu, June 13	at Montreal Alouettes	L 7–38	0–1	Olympic Stadium	11,215
B	Wed, June 19	vs. Toronto Argonauts	L 6–34	0–2	Frank Clair Stadium	14,024

== Final standings ==
=== Season standings ===
East Division
Pos	Team	Pld	W	L	PF	PA	PD	Pts
1	Toronto Argonauts (C, Q)	18	15	3	556	359	+197	30
2	Montreal Alouettes (Q)	18	12	6	536	467	+69	24
3	Hamilton Tiger-Cats (Q)	18	8	10	426	576	−150	16
4	Ottawa Rough Riders (Q)	18	3	15	352	524	−172	6

Source: "CFL.ca". Archived from the original on 2009-07-29.
(C) First round bye; (Q) Qualified for playoffs

== Regular season ==
=== Schedule ===
Week	Game	Date	Opponent	Results		Venue	Attendance
Week	Game	Date	Opponent	Score	Record	Venue	Attendance
1	1	Fri, June 28	at Hamilton Tiger-Cats	L 23–35	0–1	Ivor Wynne Stadium	19,149
2	2	Wed, July 3	vs. Saskatchewan Roughriders	L 14–29	0–2	Frank Clair Stadium	10,125
3	3	Fri, July 12	vs. BC Lions	W 32–21	1–2	Frank Clair Stadium	13,489
4	4	Wed, July 17	at Toronto Argonauts	L 4–34	1–3	SkyDome	17,288
5	5	Thu, July 25	vs. Edmonton Eskimos	L 18–34	1–4	Frank Clair Stadium	13,323
6	6	Sat, Aug 3	at Edmonton Eskimos	L 2–30	1–5	Commonwealth Stadium	25,773
7	7	Fri, Aug 9	at Winnipeg Blue Bombers	L 27–31	1–6	Winnipeg Stadium	25,219
8	8	Thu, Aug 15	vs. Toronto Argonauts	L 19–42	1–7	Frank Clair Stadium	15,220
9	9	Sat, Aug 24	at Toronto Argonauts	L 21–28	1–8	SkyDome	17,182
10	10	Fri, Aug 30	vs. Montreal Alouettes	W 17–6	2–8	Frank Clair Stadium	28,451
11	Bye						
12	11	Sun, Sept 15	at Saskatchewan Roughriders	W 18–16	3–8	Taylor Field	19,567
13	12	Sun, Sept 22	vs. Hamilton Tiger-Cats	L 21–24	3–9	Frank Clair Stadium	26,813
14	13	Fri, Sept 27	at Calgary Stampeders	L 17–24	3–10	McMahon Stadium	21,607
15	14	Sat, Oct 5	vs. Calgary Stampeders	L 27–31	3–11	Frank Clair Stadium	15,025
16	15	Mon, Oct 14	vs. Montreal Alouettes	L 18–25	3–12	Frank Clair Stadium	14,080
17	16	Sat, Oct 19	at Montreal Alouettes	L 25–39	3–13	Olympic Stadium	18,671
18	17	Sat, Oct 26	vs. Winnipeg Blue Bombers	L 29–30	3–14	Frank Clair Stadium	15,095
19	18	Sat, Nov 2	at BC Lions	L 24–35	3–15	BC Place	18,308

== Roster ==
1996 Ottawa Rough Riders final roster
Quarterbacks: 18 David Archer; 3 Steve Taylor; Running backs: 34 Shawn Daniels; 21 Dave Dinnall; 1 Troy Mills; 32 Sean Reade; Receivers: 89 Travis Anderson; 87 André Bolduc; 85 James Ellingson; 84 Bob Gordon; 82 Will Hinchcliff; 86 Joe Kralik; 83 Joseph Rogers	Offensive linemen: 68 Duane Arrindell G; 57 Chris Burns T; 69 Chuck Esty G/T; 59 James Monroe C; 73 Uzooma Okeke T; 51 Robert Stevenson G; Defensive linemen: 90 Swift Burch DE; 99 Jeff Cummins DE; 93 Stacy Evans DE; 96 Obie Spanic NT; 98 Lubo Zizakovic NT	Linebackers: 95 Ray Bernard; 42 Michael Hendricks; 44 DeWayne Knight; 38 Lamar McGriggs; 56 Jermaine Younger; Defensive backs: 22 Sammie Brennan; 6 Tommy Henry; 23 Leonard Humphries; 8 Joe Mero; 5 Frank West; 25 Kenny Wilhite; Special teams: 9 Wayne Lammle K/P	Injured list: 61 Kai Bjorn T; 20 Jayson Dzikowicz DB; 19 Eric Geter DB; 27 Mike Gillock DB; 2 Profail Grier RB; 58 Dave Harper LB; 81 Kelvin Means WR; 55 Mike Schad G; 10 Orlondo Steinauer DB; 7 Jason Wallace DB; Italics indicate International player

== Awards and honours ==
=== CFL All-Stars ===
- WR – Joseph Rogers, CFL All-Star

=== Eastern All-Stars ===
- WR – Joseph Rogers, CFL Eastern All-Star
- LB – Lamar McGriggs, CFL Eastern All-Star
- DB – Kenny Wilhite, CFL Eastern All-Star
