= 1996 Calgary Stampeders season =

Canadian football team season

- Owner: Sig Gutsche
- General manager: Wally Buono
- President: Sig Gutsche
- Head coach: Wally Buono
- Home stadium: McMahon Stadium

Results
- Record: 13–5
- Division place: 1st, West
- Playoffs: Lost West Final

Uniform

The 1996 Calgary Stampeders finished in first place in the West Division with a 13–5 record. They appeared in the West Final but lost to the Edmonton Eskimos.

== Offseason ==
=== CFL draft ===
Rd	Pick	Player	Position	School
1	8	Farell Duclair	LB	Concordia
2	17	Rob Robinson	DT	Cincinnati
3	21	Jean-Agnes Charles	DB	Michigan
3	26	Cory Stevens	P/K	Minot State
4	35	Vito Greco	LB/FB	Carleton
5	44	Jung-Yul Kim	OT	Toronto
6	52	David Lane	OL	Simon Fraser

== Preseason ==
Week	Date	Opponent	Result	Record	Attendance
A	June 10	vs. Saskatchewan Roughriders	W 26–15	1–0	19,214
B	June 14	at BC Lions	W 33–21	2–0	

== Regular season ==
=== Season standings ===
West Division
Pos	Team	Pld	W	L	PF	PA	PD	Pts
1	Calgary Stampeders (C, Q)	18	13	5	608	375	+233	26
2	Edmonton Eskimos (Q)	18	11	7	459	354	+105	22
3	Winnipeg Blue Bombers (Q)	18	9	9	421	495	−74	18
4	Saskatchewan Roughriders (Q)	18	5	13	360	498	−138	10
5	BC Lions	18	5	13	410	483	−73	10

Source: "CFL.ca". Archived from the original on 2009-07-29.
(C) First round bye; (Q) Qualified for playoffs

=== Season schedule ===
Week	Date	Opponent	Result	Record
1	June 23	at Saskatchewan Roughriders	W 33–13	1–0
2	June 29	vs. Winnipeg Blue Bombers	W 39–12	2–0
3	July 10	at Montreal Alouettes	W 62–22	3–0
4	July 20	vs. Hamilton Tiger-Cats	W 40–22	4–0
5	July 27	at Winnipeg Blue Bombers	L 36–38	4–1
6	Aug 5	vs. Saskatchewan Roughriders	W 38–11	5–1
7	Aug 10	at BC Lions	W 32–7	6–1
8	Aug 16	at Hamilton Tiger-Cats	W 47–10	7–1
9	Aug 21	vs. BC Lions	W 23–21	8–1
10	Sept 2	vs. Edmonton Eskimos	W 31–13	9–1
11	Sept 6	at Edmonton Eskimos	L 19–20	9–2
12	Sept 13	vs. Montreal Alouettes	L 23–25	9–3
13	Sept 21	at Toronto Argonauts	L 22–23	9–4
14	Sept 27	vs. Ottawa Rough Riders	W 24–17	10–4
15	Oct 5	at Ottawa Rough Riders	W 31–24	11–4
16	Oct 14	vs. Toronto Argonauts	W 30–23	12–4
17	Oct 27	at Edmonton Eskimos	L 32–41	12–5
18	Nov 3	vs. Saskatchewan Roughriders	W 46–23	13–5

== Awards and records ==
- Jackie Parker Trophy – Kelvin Anderson (RB)

=== Offence ===
- OG – Rocco Romano
- OT – Fred Childress

=== Defence ===
- CB – Al Jordan
- CB – Marvin Coleman

=== Special teams ===
- K – Mark McLoughlin

=== Offence ===
- QB – Jeff Garcia
- SB – Allen Pitts
- WR – Terry Vaughn
- OG – Rocco Romano
- OT – Fred Childress

=== Defence ===
- DT – Rodney Harding, Calgary Stampeders
- CB – Al Jordan, Calgary Stampeders
- CB – Marvin Coleman, Calgary Stampeders

=== Special teams ===
- P – Tony Martino, Calgary Stampeders
- K – Mark McLoughlin, Calgary Stampeders
- ST –Marvin Coleman, Calgary Stampeders

== Playoffs ==
=== West Final ===
Team	Q1	Q2	Q3	Q4	Total
Edmonton Eskimos	6	6	0	3	15
Calgary Stampeders	3	3	3	3	12

== Roster ==
1996 Calgary Stampeders final roster
Quarterbacks: 6 Danny Barrett; 7 Jeff Garcia; Running backs: 32 Kelvin Anderson; 28 Farell Duclair; 34 Duane Forde; Receivers: 88 Vince Danielsen; 83 Travis Moore; 18 Allen Pitts; 87 Kevin Reid; 25 Dave Sapunjis; 2 Terry Vaughn	Offensive linemen: 68 Freddie Childress T; 60 Bruce Covernton T; 67 Jamie Crysdale C; 50 Jay McNeil G; 63 Rohn Meyer G; 59 Rocco Romano G/T; Defensive linemen: 98 Ernie Brown DT; 64 Wayne Drinkwalter DT; 77 Rodney Harding DE; 81 Will Johnson DE; 75 Stu Laird DT; 92 DeWayne Patterson DT	Linebackers: 44 Ray Biggs; 39 Aaron Hall; 4 Darryl Hall; 51 Alondra Johnson; 41 Anthony McClanahan; 91 Marvin Pope; 31 Roger Reinson; Defensive backs: 17 Marvin Coleman; 29 Eddie Davis; 27 Al Jordan; 3 Jackie Kellogg; 8 Greg Knox; 30 Kenton Leonard	Special teams: 11 Tony Martino P/K; 13 Mark McLoughlin K; Injured list: 92 Steve Anderson DT; 15 Dave Dickenson QB; 86 Demetrius Smith WR; Italics indicate International player
