= 1996 Hamilton Tiger-Cats season =

Season of Canadian Football League team the Hamilton Tiger-Cats

- Head coach: Don Sutherin
- Home stadium: Ivor Wynne Stadium

Results
- Record: 8–10
- Division place: 3rd, East
- Playoffs: Lost East Semi-Final
- Team MOP: Mac Cody
- Team MOC: Paul Osbaldiston
- Team MOR: Justin Ring

The 1996 Hamilton Tiger-Cats season was the 39th season for the team in the Canadian Football League (CFL) and their 47th overall. The Tiger-Cats finished in third place in the East Division with an 8–10 record. They appeared in the East Semi-Final but lost to the Montreal Alouettes.

== Offseason ==
=== CFL draft ===
Rd	Pick	Player	Position	School
1	5	Justin Ring	LB	Simon Fraser
2	10	Kyle Walters	DB	Guelph
2	14	Mike Mihelic	OT	Indiana
4	32	Dan Brown	FB/RB	Bemidji State
5	41	Paul Kent	OL	Kutztown
6	49	Troy Russel	DB	Bishop's
7	58	David Burnie	DE	Western Ontario

== Preseason ==
Week	Date	Opponent	Results		Venue	Attendance
Week	Date	Opponent	Score	Record	Venue	Attendance
B	June 13	at Toronto Argonauts	W 37–27	1–0		
C	June 20	vs. Montreal Alouettes	L 39–43	1–1		

== Regular season ==
=== Season standings ===
East Division
Pos	Team	Pld	W	L	PF	PA	PD	Pts
1	Toronto Argonauts (C, Q)	18	15	3	556	359	+197	30
2	Montreal Alouettes (Q)	18	12	6	536	467	+69	24
3	Hamilton Tiger-Cats (Q)	18	8	10	426	576	−150	16
4	Ottawa Rough Riders	18	3	15	352	524	−172	6

Source: "CFL.ca". Archived from the original on 2009-07-29.
(C) First round bye; (Q) Qualified for playoffs

=== Schedule ===
Week	Game	Date	Opponent	Results		Venue	Attendance
Week	Game	Date	Opponent	Score	Record	Venue	Attendance
1	1	June 28	vs. Ottawa Rough Riders	35–23	1–0		
2	2	July 4	at Toronto Argonauts	W 38–36	2–0		
3	3	July 14	vs. Saskatchewan Roughriders	W 27–24	3–0		
4	4	July 20	at Calgary Stampeders	L 22–40	3–1		
5	5	July 27	at BC Lions	W 28–24	4–1		
6	6	Aug 2	vs. BC Lions	L 25–30	4–2		
7	7	Aug 7	at Montreal Alouettes	L 22–29	4–3		
8	8	Aug 16	vs. Calgary Stampeders	L 10–47	4–4		
9	9	Aug 23	at Edmonton Eskimos	L 8–35	4–5		
10	10	Sept 2	vs. Toronto Argonauts	L 7–38	4–6		
11	11	Sept 8	at Winnipeg Blue Bombers	L 15–33	4–7		
12	12	Sept 15	vs. Edmonton Eskimos	W 20–14	5–7		
13	13	Sept 22	at Ottawa Rough Riders	W 24–21	6–7		
14	14	Sept 29	vs. Montreal Alouettes	W 39–38	7–7		
15	15	Oct 6	at Saskatchewan Roughriders	L 26–37	7–8		
16	Bye						
17	16	Oct 18	vs. Winnipeg Blue Bombers	W 25–15	8–8		
18	17	Oct 25	at Montreal Alouettes	L 41–45	8–9		
19	18	Nov 2	vs. Toronto Argonauts	L 14–47	8–10		

== Postseason ==
Round	Date	Opponent	Results		Venue	Attendance
Round	Date	Opponent	Score	Record	Venue	Attendance
East Semi-Final	Nov 10	at Montreal Alouettes	L 11–22	0–1		

== Roster ==
1996 Hamilton Tiger-Cats final roster
Quarterbacks: 13 Anthony Calvillo; 14 Mike Kerrigan; Running backs: 29 Dean Noel; 32 Mike Saunders; 34 Brian Walling; Receivers: 10 Mac Cody; 79 Rob Crifo; 89 Andrew Grigg; 25 Lee Knight; 2 Jason Phillips; 4 Burt Thornton	Offensive linemen: 55 Doug Davies C/G; 66 Miles Gorrell T; 60 Dwayne Morgan T; 67 Roosevelt Patterson G; 51 David Richardson T; 66 Blaine Schmidt G; 61 Jude St. John T; Defensive linemen: 58 Lou Cafazzo DT; 98 Mike Campbell DT; 90 Gonzalo Floyd DE; 53 Joe Montford DE; 99 Mike Philbrick DT; 97 Jessie Small DE	Linebackers: 45 Tommy Gerhart; 36 Justin Ring; 73 Calvin Tiggle; 27 Donovan Wright; Defensive backs: 20 Derek Grier; 17 Garry Lewis; 9 Don Robinson; 31 Sam Rogers; 33 Darryl Sampson; 7 Brett Young; Special teams: 3 Paul Osbaldiston K/P	Injured list: 52 Tim Brown LB; 16 Matt Dunigan QB; 22 Brad Elberg RB; 83 Marcus Grant WR; 35 Donovan Gans DE; 42 Rob Hitchcock DB/LB; 6 Jason Kaiser DB; 5 Ted Long SB; 82 Frank Marof SB; 56 Dale Sanderson C; 57 Val St. Germain G; Italics indicate American players
