= Nigel Williams (Canadian football) =

Canadian football player (born 1971)

No. 18, 88, 82, 86
- Position: Wide receiver

Personal information
- Born: August 16, 1971 (age 55); Montreal, Quebec, Canada
- Listed height: 6 ft 4 in (1.93 m)
- Listed weight: 206 lb (93 kg)

Career information
- University: None

Career history
- Toronto Argonauts (1992–1993)*; Hamilton Tiger-Cats (1993)*; Hamilton Tiger-Cats (1994)*; Ottawa Rough Riders (1995); Montreal Alouettes (1996–1998); Toronto Argonauts (1998); Washington Redskins (1999)*; Winnipeg Blue Bombers (1999); Edmonton Eskimos (2000); Toronto Argonauts (2001–2002); Ottawa Renegades (2002)
- * Offseason or practice squad member only

Nigel Williams (born August 16, 1971) is a Canadian former professional football player who was a wide receiver for eight seasons in the Canadian Football League (CFL) with the Ottawa Rough Riders, Montreal Alouettes, Toronto Argonauts, Winnipeg Blue Bombers, Edmonton Eskimos, and Ottawa Renegades. He played junior football in the Quebec Junior Football League and Ontario Football Conference. After stints on the practice rosters of both the Toronto Argonauts and Hamilton Tiger-Cats, Williams played in the CFL from 1995 to 2002. After a 1,000-yard season in 1998, he signed with the Washington Redskins of the National Football League (NFL) but was released before the start of the regular season. He later served two tours of duty in the Canadian Armed Forces during the War in Afghanistan.

== Early life ==
Nigel Williams was born on August 16, 1971, in Montreal, Quebec. He first played football when he was 16. He began his junior career in 1989 with the West Island Broncos of the Quebec Junior Football League. Williams then played three seasons for the Hamilton Hurricanes of the Ontario Football Conference (OFC). He was named the team's outstanding receiver in 1991. He worked as a busboy during his junior career. He also took business classes at Sheridan College, where he played basketball.

== Professional career ==
In 1992, Williams was signed to the practice roster of the Toronto Argonauts of the Canadian Football League (CFL). He continued to play for the Hurricanes while practicing with the Argonauts. He was named an OFC all-star and the Hurricanes' offensive player of the year for the 1992 season. He was also noted for his versatility: at one point he led the league in yards per carry with 26.1 (183 yards on seven carries) and yards per kickoff return with 28.2 (241 yards on five returns). Williams signed with the Argonauts again in early June 1993. However, he was released on June 26, 1993.

On August 24, 1993, it was reported that Williams had been signed to the practice roster of the CFL's Hamilton Tiger-Cats. However, he was cut shortly thereafter, and returned to the West Island Broncos in 1993 to play his final year of junior football eligibility. He signed with the Tiger-Cats again on February 7, 1994, but was later released on June 7. Williams missed the rest of the 1994 season after having surgery to remove a jaw tumor.

Williams signed with the Ottawa Rough Riders of the CFL on May 9, 1995. He dressed in 15 games for the Rough Riders during the 1995 season, catching 20 passes for 309 yards and two touchdowns while also returning 23 kickoffs for 447 yards and posting three special teams tackles. He spent part of the season on the injured list. Ottawa finished the year with a 3–15 record.

In March 1996, Williams was the first pick of the revived Montreal Alouettes in the CFL equalization draft. After the Alouettes started the year with an 0–3 record, Williams received some criticism for not catching many passes. Williams responded by stating, "I don't really care what other people think, I only care about what Nigel Williams thinks." He dressed in 16 games overall for Montreal in 1996, recording 33 receptions for 461 yards and three touchdowns, and five kickoff returns for 58 yards. The Alouettes went 12–6 and lost in the Eastern final to the Argonauts by a score of 43–7. Williams dressed in 14 games in 1997, catching 25 passes for 336 yards and two touchdowns. He missed part of the 1997 season due to a wrist injury. He dressed in the first two games of the 1998 season for Montreal and caught one pass for 13 yards.

On July 13, 1998, Williams was traded to the Argonauts for a first-round pick in the 1999 CFL draft. He dressed in the final 16 games of the season for Toronto, totaling a career-high 61 catches for 1,057 yards and five touchdowns, and six kickoff returns for 117 yards. Toronto finished 9–9 and lost in the Eastern semifinal to the Alouettes, the team that Williams began the season with.

After a strong 1998 season, Williams had workouts with several NFL teams. He signed with the Washington Redskins in February 1999, and received a $25,000 signing bonus. The Redskins' director of player personnel had previously gone to Canada in 1998 to specifically watch Williams play on October 17, 1998, against the Alouettes, a game in which Williams dropped two likely touchdowns. After signing with Washington, Williams stated, "I guess they were willing to overlook the two drops and evaluate me on my season overall". The Toronto Star noted that at 6 feet 4 inches (1.93 m) and 205 pounds (93 kg), Williams would be one of the Redskins' biggest receivers. He was released on September 6, 1999, before the start of the regular season. The New York Jets reportedly also showed some interest in Williams, but he was not allowed to sign with another NFL team due to being in the option year of his CFL contract.

On September 8, 1999, Toronto traded Williams and Brad Elberg to the Winnipeg Blue Bombers for Craig Hendrickson. Williams finished the 1999 season in Winnipeg, dressing in nine games while catching 22 passes for 311 yards and two touchdowns.

Williams became a free agent after the season. He ran a 4.45-second 40-yard dash in a workout for the NFL's Green Bay Packers, but turned down their contract offer because there was no signing bonus. He signed with the Edmonton Eskimos of the CFL on March 30, 2000. Williams dressed in all 18 games for the Eskimos in 2000, recording 40 receptions for 414 yards and four touchdowns. Edmonton finished the 2000 season with a 10–8 record and lost in the Western semifinal to the BC Lions by a margin of 34–32. Williams was released by the Eskimos on June 7, 2001, so the team could stay under the salary cap. He would have earned CA$60,000 for the 2001 season, not including performance bonuses. He worked at UPS in Edmonton after being released by the Eskimos.

Williams later signed with the Argonauts on August 7, 2001, after he called them. He dressed in 13 games for Toronto during the 2001 season and caught 24 passes for 381 yards and four touchdowns as the team finished 7–11. Williams dressed in six games for Toronto in 2002, catching seven passes for 89 yards, before being released on August 12, 2002.

Williams signed with the CFL's Ottawa Renegades on August 19, 2002. He dressed in nine games for the Renegades during the 2002 season and caught nine passes for 155 yards as Ottawa went 4–14. Williams was released on June 8, 2003, after being outplayed by other Canadian receivers the team had in camp. He finished his CFL career with totals of 118 games dressed, 242 receptions for 3,526 yards and 21 touchdowns, 37 kickoff returns for 666 yards, and 13 tackles.

== Personal life ==
Williams served in the Canadian Armed Forces from 2003 to 2016. He completed two tours of duty during the War in Afghanistan, in 2006 and 2011. While in Afghanistan, he was a radio operator and patrolman for Princess Patricia's Canadian Light Infantry. Williams said "a lot of my football buddies think I'm crazy. I got an e-mail the other day from a guy I used to play with and all he asked me was: 'What the heck are you thinking?'"

Williams graduated from the University of Oklahoma with a degree in business administration. He later started a career in real estate. He has also served as a mentor for the Amherstburg Freedom Museum.
