= 1996 BC Lions season =

Canadian football team season

- General manager: George Chayka
- Head coach: Joe Paopao
- Home stadium: BC Place Stadium

Results
- Record: 5–13
- Division place: 5th, West
- Playoffs: did not qualify

The 1996 BC Lions finished in fifth place in the West Division with a 5–13 record and failed to make the playoffs.

== Offseason ==
=== CFL draft ===
Round	Pick	Player	Position	School
1	6	Mark Pimiskern	LB	Washington State
2	15	Andrew English	SB	British Columbia
3	24	Brad Yamaoka	RB	British Columbia
4	33	Kevin Ho-Young	RB	St. Francis Xavier
5	42	Victor Bryan	DB	Simon Fraser
6	51	Brian Bourne	OL	British Columbia
7	60	Paul Greenbow	DB	Queen's

== Preseason ==
Week	Date	Opponent	Result	Record
A	June 10	at Winnipeg Blue Bombers	W 35–29	0–1
B	June 14	vs. Calgary Stampeders	L 21–33	1–1

== Regular season ==
=== Season standings ===
West Division
Pos	Team	Pld	W	L	PF	PA	PD	Pts
1	Calgary Stampeders (C, Q)	18	13	5	608	375	+233	26
2	Edmonton Eskimos (Q)	18	11	7	459	354	+105	22
3	Winnipeg Blue Bombers (Q)	18	9	9	421	495	−74	18
4	Saskatchewan Roughriders (Q)	18	5	13	360	498	−138	10
5	BC Lions	18	5	13	410	483	−73	10

Source: "CFL.ca". Archived from the original on 2009-07-29.
(C) First round bye; (Q) Qualified for playoffs

=== Season schedule ===
Week	Game	Date	Opponent	Result	Record	Venue	Attendance
1	1	June 27	vs. Edmonton Eskimos	L 14–28	0–1	BC Place	
2	2	July 6	at Winnipeg Blue Bombers	L 22–25	0–2	Winnipeg Stadium	
3	3	July 12	at Ottawa Rough Riders	L 31–32	0–3	Frank Clair Stadium	
4	4	July 19	vs. Montreal Alouettes	L 24–44	0–4	BC Place	
5	5	July 27	vs. Hamilton Tiger-Cats	L 24–28	0–5	BC Place	
6	6	Aug 2	at Hamilton Tiger-Cats	W 30–25	1–5	Ivor Wynne Stadium	
7	7	Aug 10	vs. Calgary Stampeders	L 7–32	1–6	BC Place	
8	8	Aug 15	vs. Winnipeg Blue Bombers	L 13–38	1–7	BC Place	
9	9	Aug 21	at Calgary Stampeders	L 21–23	1–8	McMahon Stadium	
10	10	Aug 26	at Winnipeg Blue Bombers	W 22–20	2–8	Winnipeg Stadium	
11	Bye						
12	11	Sept 7	at Montreal Alouettes	L 27–28	2–9	Olympic Stadium	
13	12	Sept 14	vs. Toronto Argonauts	W 35–11	3–9	BC Place	
14	13	Sept 21	vs. Saskatchewan Roughriders	W 22–10	4–9	BC Place	
15	14	Sept 29	at Edmonton Eskimos	L 12–32	4–10	Commonwealth Stadium	
16	Bye						
17	15	Oct 12	vs. Edmonton Eskimos	L 31–34	4–11	BC Place	
18	16	Oct 19	at Saskatchewan Roughriders	L 27–29	4–12	Taylor Field	
19	17	Oct 27	at Toronto Argonauts	L 21–25	4–13	SkyDome	
20	18	Nov 2	vs. Ottawa Rough Riders	W 35–24	5–13	BC Place	

== Roster ==
1996 BC Lions final roster
Quarterbacks: 9 Damon Allen; 2 Giulio Caravatta K; Running backs: 19 Paul Blackwood; 25 Sean Millington; 6 Cory Philpot; 22 Ronald Williams; Receivers: 80 Ted Alford; 85 Matt Clark; 86 Trevor Shaw; 88 Larry Thompson; 77 Mike Trevathan	Offensive linemen: 57 Carl Coulter C; 58 Craig Hendrickson T; 68 Cory Mantyka G; 69 Pat McNerney T; 64 Garry Sawatzky G/T; 60 Jamie Taras G/C; Defensive linemen: 78 Tony Bailey DE; 74 Dave Chaytors DT; 76 Joe Fleming DT; 97 Ahmani Johnson DE; 91 Tyrone Rodgers DE; 72 Johnny Scott DT	Linebackers: 90 Steve Glenn; 43 Mark Pimiskern; 31 Shelton Quarles; 96 Virgil Robertson; Defensive backs: 27 Ken Burress; 28 Reggie Carthon; 13 Tom Europe; 29 Brandon Hamilton; 17 John Holland; 11 Maurice Kelly; 18 Frank Pimiskern; 8 Andre Strode	Special teams: 5 Lui Passaglia K/P; Injured list: 56 Tyrone Chatman LB; 23 Tony Collier DB; 7 Rob Davis DB; 59 Todd Furdyk T; 21 David Maeva LB; 92 Sean Marriott LB; 3 Kelly Sims DB; 16 Chris Vargas; Italics indicate International player

== Awards and records ==
=== Western Division All-Star Selections ===
- FB – Sean Millington, Western All-Star
- DB – Andre Strode, Western All-Star

=== 1996 Intergold CFLPA All-Stars ===
- OG – Jamie Taras, Intergold CFLPA All-Star
