= 1996 Saskatchewan Roughriders season =

CFL team season

- General manager: Alan Ford
- Head coach: Jim Daley
- Home stadium: Taylor Field

Results
- Record: 5–13
- Division place: 4th, West
- Playoffs: did not qualify
- Team MOP: Robert Mimbs
- Team MOC: Dave Van Belleghem
- Team MOR: Bryce Bevill

The 1996 Saskatchewan Roughriders finished in fifth place in the West Division with a 5–13 record and missed the playoffs for the second consecutive season.

== Offseason ==
=== CFL draft ===
Round	Pick	Player	Position	School
1	3	Mike Sutherland	Offensive lineman	Northern Illinois
2	12	Tom Monois	Wide receiver	Northeastern
3	23	Alton Francis	Running back/Placekicker	Northern Illinois
4	29	Paul Frian	Linebacker	St. Francis Xavier
4	30	Dwayne Ell	Defensive lineman	North Dakota
5	39	Nelson Van Waes	Slotback/Linebacker	Tulsa
6	47	Christopher Flory	Offensive Lineman	Saskatchewan
7	56	Greg Moe	Placekicker	Saskatchewan

=== Preseason ===
Game	Date	Opponent	Results		Venue	Attendance
Game	Date	Opponent	Score	Record	Venue	Attendance
A	Mon, June 10	at Calgary Stampeders	L 28–15	0–1	McMahon Stadium	19,214
B	Fri, June 14	vs. Edmonton Eskimos	W 23–18	1–1	Taylor Field	25,632

== Regular season ==
=== Season standings ===
West Division
Pos	Team	Pld	W	L	PF	PA	PD	Pts
1	Calgary Stampeders (C, Q)	18	13	5	608	375	+233	26
2	Edmonton Eskimos (Q)	18	11	7	459	354	+105	22
3	Winnipeg Blue Bombers (Q)	18	9	9	421	495	−74	18
4	Saskatchewan Roughriders (Q)	18	5	13	360	498	−138	10
5	BC Lions	18	5	13	410	483	−73	10

Source: "CFL.ca". Archived from the original on 2009-07-29.
(C) First round bye; (Q) Qualified for playoffs

BC finished ahead of Saskatchewan in the standings by winning their 2 game regular season head-to-head series 41-37.

=== Season schedule ===
Week	Game	Date	Opponent	Results		Venue	Attendance
Week	Game	Date	Opponent	Score	Record	Venue	Attendance
1	1	Sun, June 23	vs. Calgary Stampeders	L 13–33	0–1	Taylor Field	20,311
2	2	Wed, July 3	at Ottawa Rough Riders	W 29–14	1–1	Frank Clair Stadium	10,125
3	3	Wed, July 10	vs. Edmonton Eskimos	W 27–24	2–1	Taylor Field	21,014
3	4	Sun, July 14	at Hamilton Tiger-Cats	L 24–27	2–2	Ivor Wynne Stadium	20,542
4	Bye						
5	5	Fri, July 26	vs. Toronto Argonauts	L 16–40	2–3	Taylor Field	24,902
6	6	Mon, Aug 5	at Calgary Stampeders	L 11–38	2–4	McMahon Stadium	26,110
7	7	Sun, Aug 11	vs. Montreal Alouettes	L 20–32	2–5	Taylor Field	21,997
8	8	Sat, Aug 17	at Edmonton Eskimos	L 8–25	2–6	Commonwealth Stadium	36,011
9	9	Fri, Aug 23	at Montreal Alouettes	L 16–23	2–7	Olympic Stadium	26,511
10	10	Sun, Sept 1	vs. Winnipeg Blue Bombers	W 41–23	3–7	Taylor Field	25,876
11	11	Sun, Sept 8	at Toronto Argonauts	L 13–31	3–8	SkyDome	17,576
12	12	Sun, Sept 15	vs. Ottawa Rough Riders	L 16–18	3–9	Taylor Field	19,567
13	13	Sat, Sept 21	at BC Lions	L 10–22	3–10	BC Place	21,221
14	14	Sat, Sept 28	vs. Winnipeg Blue Bombers	L 15–37	3–11	Taylor Field	19,861
15	15	Sun, Oct 6	vs. Hamilton Tiger-Cats	W 37–26	4–11	Taylor Field	22,682
16	16	Sun, Oct 13	at Winnipeg Blue Bombers	L 14–20	4–12	Winnipeg Stadium	26,161
17	17	Sat, Oct 19	vs. BC Lions	W 27–19	5–12	Taylor Field	26,537
18	Bye						
19	18	Sun, Nov 3	at Calgary Stampeders	L 23–46	5–13	McMahon Stadium	19,747

== Roster ==
1996 Saskatchewan Roughriders final roster
Quarterbacks: 9 Marvin Graves; 14 Jimmy Kemp; Running backs: 20 Darren Joseph; 27 Robert Mimbs; 5 Rick Walters; Receivers: 15 Bruce Boyko; 10 Dan Farthing; 88 Rod Harris; 89 Curtis Mayfield; 80 Don Narcisse	Offensive linemen: 63 Scott Hendrickson C; 59 Keith Hiscox G; 64 John James T; 65 Peter Shorts T; 51 John Terry T; 61 Paul Vajda G; Defensive linemen: 46 Troy Alexander DT; 71 Bobby Jurasin DE; 68 Glenn Kulka DT; 98 Lybrant Robinson DE; Special teams: 12 Frank Jagas K; 13 Brent Matich P	Linebackers: 35 Greg Battle; 70 Sheldon Benoit; 97 Brooks Findlay; 74 Dan Rashovich; 41 Gary Rogers; 99 Tommie Smith; Defensive backs: 30 Bryce Bevill; 3 Errol Brown; 31 Ryan Carey; 24 Ventson Donelson; 6 Nick Ferguson; 33 Aaron Ruffin; 2 Terryl Ulmer; 17 Dave Van Belleghem	Injured list: 93 Tim Edwards DT; 47 Ron Goetz LB; 21 Dale Joseph DB; 60 Gene Makowsky G; 11 Kevin Mason QB; 4 Paul McCallum K; 7 Heath Rylance QB; 69 Todd Storme G/T; Italics indicate American player

== Awards and records ==
=== CFL All-Star Selections ===
- Robert Mimbs, Running Back

=== Western All-Star Selections ===
- Robert Mimbs, Running Back
