= Jock Climie =

Canadian football player (born 1968)

Profile
- Positions: Slotback, Wide receiver

Personal information
- Born: 28 September 1968 (age 58); Toronto, Ontario, Canada

Career information
- University: Queen's
- CFL draft: 1990: 1st round, 4th overall pick

Career history
- 1990: Toronto Argonauts
- 1991–1994: Ottawa Rough Riders
- 1995: Toronto Argonauts
- 1996–2001: Montreal Alouettes

Awards and highlights
- Lew Hayman Trophy (1997); Russ Jackson Award (1989); 3× CFL East All-Star (1993, 1996, 1997)

Jock Climie is a Canadian retired Canadian Football League player who played the slotback position primarily with the Ottawa Rough Riders, and Montreal Alouettes. He is also a former sportscaster with Canadian sports television channel TSN as part of the CFL on TSN studio panel during the CFL season. Climie is currently a labour and employment lawyer at the Ottawa law firm of Emond Harnden.

== College career ==
While attending Queen's University, Climie played university football for the Queen's Golden Gaels. His 1,091 receiving yards in 1988 was at the time the single-season record for Canadian university football; it has since been broken, first by Don Blair (University of Calgary), then by Andy Fantuz (University of Western Ontario); Fantuz played one more game during his college career. Climie was the OQIFC conference's nominee for outstanding national player in 1988. He was inducted into the Queen's Football Hall of Fame. He earned his law degree at Queen's by attending its winter academic sessions while playing CFL football in the summer and fall, taking six terms over six years to graduate.

== Professional career ==
Following his outstanding college career, Climie was drafted fourth overall in the 1990 CFL draft by the Toronto Argonauts. He dressed for the first two games of the season, but was then relegated to the practice roster. Soon after, he was signed by the Ottawa Rough Riders and would go on to play in 62 games for the franchise while also being named a CFL East All-Star in 1993. Climie re-signed with the Argonauts in 1995 and then signed with the newly reborn Montreal Alouettes in 1996. That year, he was again named a CFL East All-Star and he repeated the feat in 1997, while also being awarded the Lew Hayman Trophy as the top Canadian player in the CFL's East Division. Climie finished his career as an Alouette in 2001, having recorded 627 catches for 9619 yards and 56 touchdowns and finishing in the top 20 in receiving yardage at the time of his retirement.

== Statistics ==
Receiving		Regular season
Year	Team	Games	No.	Yards	Avg	Long	TD
1990	TOR	2	2	20	10.0	16	0
1991	OTT	16	32	599	18.7	62	1
1992	OTT	18	57	901	15.8	50	6
1993	OTT	18	67	1281	19.1	89	11
1994	OTT	10	46	622	13.5	39	5
1995	TOR	13	48	563	11.7	49	3
1996	MTL	18	68	1209	17.8	62	9
1997	MTL	18	89	1214	13.6	43	6
1998	MTL	18	55	783	14.2	75	6
1999	MTL	11	50	581	11.6	89	3
2000	MTL	17	67	1002	15.0	80	5
2001	MTL	16	46	844	18.3	68	1
CFL totals		175	627	9619	15.3	89	56
