= Spencer McLennan =

Canadian football player

No. 16
- Positions: Safety, Cornerback, Slotback

Personal information
- Born: October 10, 1966 (age 60); Kelowna, British Columbia, Canada
- Listed height: 5 ft 10 in (1.78 m)
- Listed weight: 175 lb (79 kg)

Career history
- 1991–1995: BC Lions
- 1996–1997: Montreal Alouettes
- 1998–2000: Winnipeg Blue Bombers

Awards and highlights
- Grey Cup champion (1994); CFL East All-Star (1996)

Spencer McLennan (born October 10, 1966) is a Canadian former professional football player in the Canadian Football League (CFL) for ten years. McLennan played safety and slotback for the three teams, the British Columbia Lions, Montreal Alouettes and Winnipeg Blue Bombers from 1991 to 2000. He also occasionally played cornerback. He was a CFL East All-Star in 1996.
