= Robert Mimbs =

American gridiron football player (born 1964)

No. 27
- Position: Running back

Personal information
- Born: August 6, 1964 (age 62); Kansas City, Missouri, U.S.

Career information
- College: Kansas

Career history
- 1986: New York Jets*
- 1986: Dallas Cowboys*
- 1987–1988: St. Louis Cardinals
- 1990–1992: Winnipeg Blue Bombers
- 1992–1993: BC Lions
- 1995–1997: Saskatchewan Roughriders
- * Offseason or practice squad member only

Awards and highlights
- Grey Cup champion (1990); Jeff Nicklin Memorial Trophy (1996); Eddie James Memorial Trophy (1996); 3× CFL All-Star (1990, 1991, 1996); 2× CFL East All-Star (1990, 1991); CFL West All-Star (1996)

Robert Mimbs (born August 6, 1964) is a former star Canadian Football League running back who played six seasons for three teams. He was named CFL All-Star three times and he won the Jeff Russel Memorial Trophy in 1991 and the Eddie James Memorial Trophy and Jeff Nicklin Memorial Trophy in 1996.

== NFL career ==
From 1986 to 1989, Mimbs had tryouts with the New York Jets, Dallas Cowboys and Phoenix Cardinals of the NFL. Mimbs' stint with Phoenix included time as a replacement player during the strike in 1987.

== CFL career ==
The Winnipeg Blue Bombers signed Mimbs for the 1990 season after his release by Phoenix, and Mimbs had a fantastic rookie season. In 1990, Mimbs led the league with 1,341 rushing yards and caught 71 passes for another 538 yards. He led the league with 1,879 yards from scrimmage. Mimbs followed that up in 1991 with an even better season, he once again led the league with 1,769 yards rushing and had 39 catches for 438 yards. He set a CFL records with 2,207 yards from scrimmage in 1991. Mimbs was named to the All-Canadian team in both of those first two seasons, won the CFL rushing title in both seasons and was the runner-up for the Most Outstanding Player in 1991. Despite that success, Mimbs was released just seven games into the 1992 season by the Bombers with just 392 yards on only 76 carries which was a far cry from the number of touches he got in his first two seasons.

The BC Lions picked up Mimbs as a free agent and he played 3 games for them in 1992 and just two games in 1993 before Mimbs was released for the second time. After sitting out the 1994 season, Mimbs tried to revive his career by signing with the Saskatchewan Roughriders in September 1995. Playing in only six games as the season wound down, Mimbs showed signs of returning to his old form, running for 444 yards. In a full season in 1996, Mimbs showed he was back to his old form as he led the CFL in rushing for the third time in his career with 1,403 yards, he also led the league with 1,738 yards from scrimmage. He won the Roughriders' Most Outstanding Player award. Mimbs also earned his third All-Canadian honour and was the Western nominee and eventual runner-up for the Most Outstanding Player in the CFL. Time and perhaps injuries seemed to catch up to Mimbs in his final season in 1997 as he ran for 493 yards in ten games. Mimbs finished his career with 6162 yards rushing.

== Personal life ==
Mimbs' son D'Sean Mimbs also plays in the CFL.

== Career regular season rushing statistics ==
Year	Team	GP	Rush	Yards	Y/R	Lg	TD
1990	Winnipeg Blue Bombers	18	285	1341	4.7	32	6
1991	Winnipeg Blue Bombers	18	326	1769	5.4	47	15
1992	Winnipeg Blue Bombers	7	76	392	5.2	36	4
1992	BC Lions	3	43	190	4.4	17	0
1993	BC Lions	2	22	130	5.9	28	1
1995	Saskatchewan Roughriders	6	87	444	5.1	30	2
1996	Saskatchewan Roughriders	17	292	1403	4.8	38	8
1997	Saskatchewan Roughriders	10	113	493	4.4	26	2
	CFL Totals	81	1244	6162	5.0	47	38
