= Charles Gordon (Canadian football) =

American gridiron football player (born 1968)

Profile
- Position: Defensive back

Personal information
- Born: July 30, 1968 (age 58); Tampa, Florida, U.S.

Career information
- High school: East Lansing High School
- College: Eastern Michigan

Career history
- 1991–1993: Ottawa Rough Riders
- 1994–1995: BC Lions
- 1996–1997: Montreal Alouettes

Awards and highlights
- Grey Cup champion (1994); 2× CFL All-Star (1994, 1996); CFL East All-Star (1996); CFL West All-Star (1994)

Charles Gordon (born July 30, 1968) is an American former professional football defensive back who played in the Canadian Football League.

== College career ==
Gordon attended Eastern Michigan University from 1986 to 1989. He earned All-Mid American Conference (MAC) honors for three consecutive years, including 1986 Runner-Up for MAC Freshman of the Year, 1986 Sporting News Freshman All America Head of the Class (special mention), 1987 1st Team All MAC, and 1987 3rd Team Football News Sophomore All America 1987 AP All America (honorable mention). He helped lead Eastern Michigan University to its first and only MAC championship 10–2 overall record and 7–1 conference record. He went to the 1987 California Bowl and upset 17 1/2 point favorite San Jose State University for the only bowl game win in EMU history.

His school records include: 4th all time interceptions (12), 10th all time interception return yards, 2nd longest interception return in stadium history (Rynearson Stadium), 10th all time punt return yardage, and 3rd longest punt return touchdown in Eastern Michigan University school history (91yds).

== Professional career ==
Gordon was a professional cornerback football player in the Canadian Football League for seven years between 1991 and 1997. He played for five different teams. He signed as a free agent with the Toronto Argonauts of the CFL in 1991. He returned an interception 104 yards in a 1991 pre-season game vs the Hamilton Tiger-Cats. He was traded to the Ottawa Roughriders during his 1991 rookie season. He was All Eastern Division with the Ottawa Rough Riders. He signed as a free agent with the British Columbia Lions (B.C. Lions) in 1994, and was All Western Division and a Canadian Football League Western All-Star with the Lions. The 1994 British Columbia Lions defeated the Baltimore Stallions, 26-23, for the 82nd Grey Cup championship.

Gordon was the 70th pick in the 1997 World League draft (NFL Europe) by the Amsterdam Admirals.

He signed as a free agent with the Montreal Alouettes in 1996. He was All Eastern Division and a Canadian Football League Eastern All-Star in Montreal.

He signed as a free agent with the Winnipeg Blue Bombers in 2000.

Gordon was a member of the 1994 British Columbia Lions team that defeated the Baltimore Stallions, 26-23, for the 82nd Grey Cup championship.
