= Andre Strode =

American gridiron football player (born 1972)

No. 4, 8, 16
- Position: Defensive back

Personal information
- Born: June 19, 1972 (age 54); Denver, Colorado, U.S.
- Listed height: 5 ft 8 in (1.73 m)
- Listed weight: 178 lb (81 kg)

Career information
- High school: Montbello (Denver)
- College: Colorado State
- NFL draft: 1995: undrafted

Career history
- 1995: Birmingham Barracudas
- 1996–1998: BC Lions
- 1999: Winnipeg Blue Bombers

Awards and highlights
- CFL Southern All-Star (1995); CFL West All-Star (1996); Second-team All-WAC (1993)

Career CFL statistics
- Tackles: 217
- Interceptions: 12
- Quarterback sacks: 2
- Fumbles recovered: 3
- Total TDs: 2

Andre Strode (born June 19, 1972) is an American former professional football defensive back who played five seasons in the Canadian Football League (CFL) with the Birmingham Barracudas, BC Lions and Winnipeg Blue Bombers. He played college football at Colorado State University.

== Early life ==
Andre Strode was born on June 19, 1972, in Denver, Colorado. He attended Montbello High School in Denver.

== College career ==
Strode played for the Colorado State Rams from 1991 to 1994. He totaled one interception for nine yards in 1991, one interception for five yards in 1992, and three interceptions for 128 yards and two touchdowns in 1993. His three interceptions led the Western Athletic Conference while his two interception return touchdowns were tied for most in the country that season. He recorded 246 tackles in his college career.

== Professional career ==
Strode played in all 18 games for the Birmingham Barracudas of the Canadian Football League (CFL) in 1995, recording 65 defensive tackles, eight special teams tackles, seven interceptions for 109 yards and one touchdown, seven pass breakups, and two fumble recoveries. His seven interceptions were tied for second in the CFL. The Barracudas finished the season with a 10–8 record and lost in the South Division semifinal to the San Antonio Texans. Strode was named a CFL Southern All-Star that season.

Strode was selected by the BC Lions in the second round, with the 15th overall pick, of the 1996 CFL Dispersal Draft. He started all 18 games for the Lions in 1996, accumulating 59 defensive tackles, six special teams tackles, two sacks, three interceptions for 81 yards and one touchdown, five pass breakups, and one fumble recovery. The Lions finished with a 5–13 record. Strode was named a CFL Western All-Star for his performance during the 1996 season. He suffered an injury in the first game of the 1997 season and did not play for the remainder of the year. He played in 17 games in 1998, accumulating 53 defensive tackles, one special teams tackle, two interceptions for 72 yards, and four pass breakups.

Strode played six games for the CFL's Winnipeg Blue Bombers in 1999, recording 24 defensive tackles and one pass breakup.
