= Leroy Blugh =

Canadian football coach (born 1966)

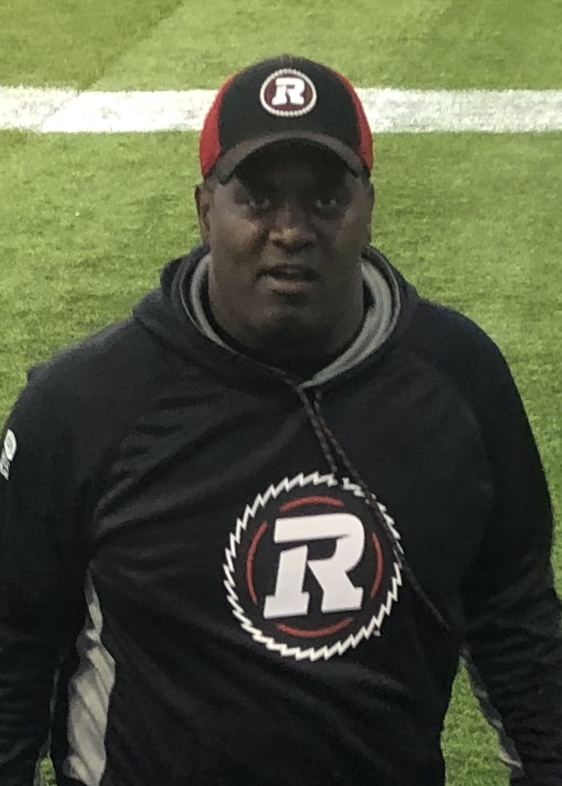
- Blugh with the Ottawa Redblacks in 2019

Queen's Gaels
- Title: Defensive line coach

Personal information
- Born: May 14, 1966 (age 60); Saint Vincent and the Grenadines
- Listed height: 6 ft 2 in (1.88 m)
- Listed weight: 230 lb (104 kg)

Career information
- Position: Defensive lineman
- High school: Napanee District Secondary
- University: Bishop's
- CFL draft: 1989: 1st round, 7th overall pick

Career history

Playing
- 1989–2000: Edmonton Eskimos
- 2001–2003: Toronto Argonauts

Coaching
- 2005–2010: Bishop's Gaiters (Head coach)
- 2011–2012: Queen's Gaels (Asst. coach)
- 2013: Edmonton Eskimos (DL coach)
- 2014–2019: Ottawa Redblacks (DL coach)
- 2020: BC Lions (DL coach)
- 2022–present: Queen's Gaels (DL coach)

Awards and highlights
- 2× Grey Cup champion (1993, 2016); CFL's Most Outstanding Canadian Award (1996); Dr. Beattie Martin Trophy (1996); 2× CFL West All-Star (1996, 1998); Presidents' Trophy (1988)
- Canadian Football Hall of Fame (Class of 2015)

Leroy Blugh (born May 14, 1966) is a former professional Canadian football defensive lineman and the defensive line coach for the Queen's Gaels of U Sports football. He played for fifteen seasons in the Canadian Football League (CFL) for two different teams and was the winner of the CFL's Most Outstanding Canadian Award in 1996 and is a two-time CFL West Division All-Star and a 81st Grey Cup Champion (1993). In 2015, he was inducted into the Canadian Football Hall of Fame.

== Early life ==
Blugh was born in Saint Vincent and the Grenadines and grew up in Napanee, Ontario, where his family moved when he was five years old.

== Coaching career ==
Blugh served as the head football coach at Bishop's University, his alma mater, from 2005 until his resignation after the 2010 season. He was named Defensive Line coach for Queen's University in August 2011 and spent two seasons with the Gaels.

After one year with the Edmonton Eskimos as their defensive line coach, he was hired by the Ottawa Redblacks to serve in the same capacity on February 3, 2014. He spent six seasons with Ottawa, highlighted by a championship win in the 104th Grey Cup game. After the Redblacks' head coach, Rick Campbell, resigned and joined the BC Lions, Blugh was announced as part of his 2020 staff on January 6, 2020. However, the team did not play in 2020 due to the cancellation of the 2020 CFL season and Blugh resigned from his position with the Lions on July 20, 2021, for personal reasons. After sitting out for one year, he was named the defensive line coach for the Queen's Gaels on June 6, 2022.
