= Glenn Rogers (gridiron football) =

American gridiron football player (born 1969)

Glenn Rogers Jr
No. 26
- Position: Defensive back

Personal information
- Born: June 8, 1969 (age 57); Memphis, Tennessee, U.S.
- Listed height: 6 ft 0 in (1.83 m)

Career information
- College: Memphis

Career history
- 1991: Tampa Bay Buccaneers (NFL)
- 1993–1997: Edmonton Eskimos
- 1998: BC Lions
- 1999: Saskatchewan Roughriders

Awards and highlights
- Grey Cup champion (1993).; 3× CFL All-Star (1995, 1996, 1997); 3× CFL West All-Star (1996, 1997, 1998); First Team All-South Independent (1990)
- Stats at Pro Football Reference

Glenn Edward Rogers Jr. (born June 8, 1969) is a former football player in the Canadian Football League (CFL) for seven years. He also played one season in the National Football League (NFL). He played college football at Memphis State University, now known as the University of Memphis, from 1987 to 1991 as a defensive back.

== Football career ==
Rogers played defensive back for three different teams, mainly for the Edmonton Eskimos from 1993 to 1999. He was a CFL All-Star three times and was part of a Grey Cup winning team for the Eskimos in 1993. He also played for the Tampa Bay Buccaneers in 1991 for only one season. The Grey Cup is the Canadian equivalent to the NFL Super Bowl. Rogers is a teacher/coach, formerly at Memphis University School in Memphis, TN. In July 2025 Rogers started a new journey as an Admissions Counselor/ Football Coach at Christian Brothers High School in Memphis TN. Rogers is married to Tonette Rogers and has two children named Kendrick and Mya.
