= Jimmy Cunningham =

American gridiron football player (born 1973)

No. 86, 21
- Positions: Wide receiver, Kick returner

Personal information
- Born: January 1, 1973 (age 53); Houston, Texas, U.S.

Career information
- College: Howard

Career history
- 1995–1996: Toronto Argonauts
- 1997–2000: BC Lions
- 1997: Buffalo Bills
- 2001: San Francisco Demons
- 2002: Toronto Argonauts

Awards and highlights
- 2× Grey Cup champion (1996, 2000); John Agro Special Teams Award (1999); 2× CFL All-Star (1996, 1999); CFL East All-Star (1996); CFL West All-Star (1999)

James "Jimmy The Jet" Cunningham (born January 1, 1973) is an American former professional football return specialist and wide receiver in the Canadian Football League (CFL) and the XFL.
