= Mike Kiselak =

American football player (born 1967)

No. 63, 71
- Positions: Center, guard

Personal information
- Born: March 9, 1967 (age 59); North Tarrytown, New York, U.S.
- Listed height: 6 ft 3 in (1.91 m)
- Listed weight: 295 lb (134 kg)

Career information
- High school: Pine Bush (Pine Bush, New York)
- College: Maryland
- NFL draft: 1990: undrafted

Career history
- Kansas City Chiefs (1990)*; San Antonio Riders (1991); Houston Oilers (1991)*; San Antonio Riders (1992); New York Giants (1992)*; Sacramento Gold Miners (1993–1994); San Antonio Texans (1995); Toronto Argonauts (1996–1997); Dallas Cowboys (1998–1999); San Francisco Demons (2001)
- * Offseason or practice squad member only

Awards and highlights
- CFL South All-Star (1995); 3× CFL All-Star (1995, 1996, 1997); 2× CFL East All-Star (1996, 1997); 2× CFL's Most Outstanding Offensive Lineman Award (1996, 1997); 2× Grey Cup champion (1996, 1997)

Career NFL statistics
- Games played: 15
- Stats at Pro Football Reference

Michael John Kiselak (born March 9, 1967) is an American former professional football player who was a guard in the Canadian Football League (CFL) for the Sacramento Gold Miners, San Antonio Texans and Toronto Argonauts. He also was a member of the Dallas Cowboys in the National Football League (NFL), San Antonio Riders in the World League of American Football (WLAF) and San Francisco Demons in the XFL. He played college football for the Maryland Terrapins.

== Early life ==
Kiselak attended Pine Bush High School, where he played as a two-way player (defensive and offensive tackle). He also practiced baseball.

He accepted a football scholarship from the University of Maryland, College Park, to play under head coach played for Bobby Ross. He began his college career playing on defense as a defensive tackle. As a sophomore, he registered 16 tackles, one interception and one quarterback sack at nose guard.

As a junior, he was converted into a guard to improve the offensive line depth and started the last seven games. He was a regular starter as a senior and after his game against Wake Forest University, he was named the Atlantic Coast Conference Offensive Lineman of the Week.

== Professional career ==
Kiselak was signed as an undrafted free agent by the Kansas City Chiefs after the 1990 NFL draft on May 1, and was waived on August 27.

In 1991, he was selected by the San Antonio Riders in the fourth round of the WLAF Draft, playing in the inaugural season of World League of American Football. He started as an offensive tackle protecting the future Dallas Cowboys head coach Jason Garrett. On July 16, 1991, he signed with the Houston Oilers. He was released on August 19.

In 1992, he signed with the Riders and was named the starter at offensive tackle. On June 2, 1992, he was signed by the New York Giants. He was cut on August 24.

On April 7, 1993, he signed with the Sacramento Gold Miners of the CFL, where he was converted into a center. After two years he signed as a free agent with the San Antonio Texans and played with them until the team folded. He was selected by the Saskatchewan Roughriders in the 1996 CFL Dispersal Draft. On April 4, 1996, he was traded before the season started to the Toronto Argonauts in exchange for offensive tackle John Terry.

Kiselak played center for the Argonauts, where he protected Doug Flutie and helped the team win two Grey Cups. He was an All-Star and received the CFL's Most Outstanding Offensive Lineman Award in consecutive years.

In 1998, he seized the opportunity and moved to the NFL to play for the Dallas Cowboys. He made the team as a 31-year-old rookie, after showing he could play three different positions. He passed Clay Shiver on the depth chart, starting the last seven games at center. In 1999, he was placed on the injured reserve list, after suffering a career threatening left knee injury (tore his lateral meniscus, anterior cruciate, medial cruciate and posterior cruciate ligaments) during the first full-team workout on July 30.

In 2001, he came back from his knee injury and was selected in the 14th round of the XFL supplemental draft by the San Francisco Demons. He was a starter at center until the league folded.

== Personal life ==
Since 2007, Kiselak has been one of the board of directors for Kids Matters International, a children's charity organization. Where he has helped clothe thousands of children in need through the organizations local outreach called "Around the Block". Michael and his wife since 1992, Kim, have been involved in clothing kids since his playing days in Dallas in 1998. He is also a church minister under Church on the Rock- International and a motivational speaker.
