= Chris Perez (gridiron football) =

American gridiron football player (born 1969)

No. 77, 62
- Position: Offensive tackle

Personal information
- Born: June 21, 1969 (age 57); Park Ridge, Illinois, U.S.
- Listed height: 6 ft 5 in (1.96 m)
- Listed weight: 280 lb (127 kg)

Career information
- High school: Fremd (Palatine, Illinois)
- College: Kansas
- NFL draft: 1992: 5th round, 124th overall pick

Career history
- 1992: Miami Dolphins*
- 1993: New England Patriots*
- 1993: Phoenix Cardinals*
- 1994: Green Bay Packers*
- 1995: Barcelona Dragons
- 1995: Memphis Mad Dogs
- 1996: Toronto Argonauts
- 1997–2000: Winnipeg Blue Bombers
- 2000: BC Lions
- 2001: Chicago Enforcers
- * Offseason or practice squad member only

Awards and highlights
- 2× Grey Cup champion (1996, 2000); All-XFL (2001); 2× CFL All-Star (1996, 2000); 2× CFL East All-Star (1996, 1998); CFL West All-Star (2000); First-team All-Big Eight (1991); Second-team All-Big Eight (1990)

Christopher Perez (born June 21, 1969) is an American former professional football offensive tackle who played six seasons in the Canadian Football League (CFL) with the Memphis Mad Dogs, Toronto Argonauts, Winnipeg Blue Bombers and BC Lions. He was selected by the Miami Dolphins in the fifth round of the 1992 NFL draft. He played college football at the University of Kansas. Perez was also a member of the New England Patriots, Phoenix Cardinals, Green Bay Packers, Barcelona Dragons and Chicago Enforcers.

== Early life ==
Perez attended William Fremd High School in Palatine, Illinois. He played college football for the Kansas Jayhawks from 1988 to 1991.

== Professional career ==
Perez was selected by the Miami Dolphins of the National Football League (NFL) in the fifth round with the 124th pick in the 1992 NFL draft. He was signed by the Dolphins on July 18, 1992. He was released by the Dolphins on August 26, 1992. Perez was signed by the NFL's New England Patriots on March 5, 1993. He was released by the Patriots on August 30 and signed to the team's practice squad on August 31, 1993. He was released by the Patriots on October 27, 1993. On November 17, 1993, Perez was signed to the practice squad of the Phoenix Cardinals of the NFL. He spent the 1994 off-season with the NFL's Green Bay Packers. He was released by the Packers on July 21, 1994. Perez was selected by the Barcelona Dragons of the World League of American Football (WLAF) with the 22nd pick in the 1995 WLAF Draft and played for the team during the 1995 season.

He played in eighteen games for the Memphis Mad Dogs of the CFL in 1995. He played in eighteen games for the CFL's Toronto Argonauts in 1996, earning CFL All-Star and CFL East All-Star honors. The Argonauts won the 84th Grey Cup on November 24, 1996 against the Edmonton Eskimos. Perez played for the Winnipeg Blue Bombers of the CFL from 1997 to 1999, appearing in 54 games for the team and garnering CFL East All-Star recognition. He was traded to the BC Lions of the CFL on February 28, 2000 for Khari Jones and B.C.'s fourth round draft choice. He played in eighteen games for the Lions in 2000, earning CFL All-Star and CFL West All-Star honors. The Lions won the 88th Grey Cup on November 26, 2000 against the Montreal Alouettes.

Perez played for the Chicago Enforcers of the XFL in 2001 and was named to the All-XFL Team.
