= Reggie Givens =

American football player (born 1971)

No. 4, 59, 58, 38
- Position: Linebacker

Personal information
- Born: October 3, 1971 (age 55); Emporia, Virginia, U.S.
- Listed height: 6 ft 0 in (1.83 m)
- Listed weight: 234 lb (106 kg)

Career information
- High school: Sussex Central (VA)
- College: Penn State
- NFL draft: 1993: 8th round, 213th overall pick

Career history
- Dallas Cowboys (1993)*; Chicago Bears (1994)*; Winnipeg Blue Bombers (1994–1995); Baltimore Stallions (1995); Toronto Argonauts (1996–1997); San Francisco 49ers (1998–1999); Washington Redskins (2000); Toronto Argonauts (2002); Ottawa Renegades (2004)
- * Offseason or practice squad member only

Awards and highlights
- Grey Cup champion (1995); CFL East All-Star (1996)

Career NFL statistics
- Tackles: 18
- Stats at Pro Football Reference

Reginald Alonzo Givens (born October 3, 1971) is an American former professional football player who was a linebacker in both the Canadian Football League (CFL) and National Football League (NFL) for the Baltimore Stallions, Toronto Argonauts, San Francisco 49ers and Washington Redskins. He played college football for the Penn State Nittany Lions.

== Early life ==
Givens attended Sussex Central High School, where he was an All-American and Virginia's high school defensive player of the year in 1988, after registering over 100 tackles. He also was a standout in basketball and track.

== College career ==
He accepted a scholarship from Penn State University and became a starter at outside linebacker as a true freshman for the last 5 games of the season, which was a difficult achievement in a Joe Paterno coached team. What he lacked in size, he compensated with his speed and instincts, finishing with 38 tackles (3 for loss), 2 sacks, 2 passes defensed and 2 fumble recoveries.

As a sophomore, he started nine games at sam linebacker, recording 47 tackles (sixth on the team), 3 tackles for loss, 5 passes defensed, 2 sacks and one interception. As a junior, he started every game for a team that finished ranked third in the nation, posting 41 tackles (5 for loss), 2 sacks and 2 interceptions.

As a senior co-captain he posted 59 tackles (second on the team), 7 tackles for loss, 7 passes defensed, 2 sacks and 2 forced fumbles. His best moment came when he was named the defensive MVP of the 1992 Fiesta Bowl in a 47-17 win against the University of Tennessee, after causing two crucial turnovers, including a fumble return for a 23-yard touchdown. After his career was over, Paterno told NFL scouts that Givens "was my best linebacker here since Jack Ham".

== Professional career ==
=== Dallas Cowboys ===
Givens was selected by the Dallas Cowboys in the eighth round (213th overall) of the 1993 NFL draft, after dropping because he was considered undersized for the linebacker position. Because of his speed, he was tried both at linebacker and strong safety. He was waived on August 30.

=== Chicago Bears ===
In 1994, he was signed by the Chicago Bears, before being released on August 18.

=== Winnipeg Blue Bombers ===
In 1994, he signed with the Winnipeg Blue Bombers. He was released the next year.

=== Baltimore Stallions ===
On August 9, 1995, he was signed by the Baltimore Stallions of the Canadian Football League. He was the backup of middle linebacker O. J. Brigance and was a part of the team that won the Grey Cup that season.

=== Toronto Argonauts ===
In 1996 he signed with the Toronto Argonauts, where he played at linebacker and rush end. He won two straight Grey Cups with the team. His 182 fumble recovery yards in 1997, was a CFL single season record.

=== San Francisco 49ers ===
In 1998 he signed with the San Francisco 49ers, where he was voted as a special teams captain in the two seasons he played with the club.

=== Washington Redskins ===
Givens signed as a free agent with the Washington Redskins on April 13, 2000. He was cut on November 9.

=== Toronto Argonauts ===
On July 29, 2002, he signed with the Toronto Argonauts. He was released the next year.

=== Ottawa Renegades ===
The Ottawa Renegades convinced Givens to come out of retirement to play for them in 2004. He was released on March 30, 2005.

== Personal life ==
Givens is a fitness and wellness coach with his own company Blitz Mobile Fitness. He is also a real estate broker.
