= Joseph Rogers (Canadian football) =

Profile
- Position: Receiver

Personal information
- Born: May 21, 1971 (age 55); Miami, Florida, U.S.

Career information
- College: Texas Southern

Career history
- 1994: Atlanta Falcons*
- 1996: Ottawa Rough Riders
- 1997: Winnipeg Blue Bombers
- 1997: Calgary Stampeders
- 1998: Edmonton Eskimos
- 1999: Winnipeg Blue Bombers
- * Offseason or practice squad member only

Awards and highlights
- CFL All-Star (1996); Frank M. Gibson Trophy (1996)

Joseph Rogers is a former all-star and award-winning Canadian Football League wide receiver.

After playing college football at Texas Southern, Rogers had an all-star rookie season in 1996 with the Ottawa Rough Riders. His 73 catches, 1259 yards and 8 touchdowns won him the Frank M. Gibson Trophy as best rookie in the CFL East. He never lived up to this performance over the next 3 seasons, playing for the Winnipeg Blue Bombers, Calgary Stampeders, Edmonton Eskimos and Winnipeg again, eventually retiring after 1999.
