= Tracy Gravely =

American gridiron football player (born 1968)

No. 7
- Position: Linebacker

Personal information
- Born: April 24, 1968 (age 58); Kimball, West Virginia, U.S.

Career information
- College: Concord

Career history
- 1990: New York Giants*
- 1991: Ottawa Rough Riders
- 1992–1993: BC Lions
- 1994–1995: Baltimore Stallions
- 1996–2001: Montreal Alouettes
- * Offseason or practice squad member only

Awards and highlights
- Super Bowl champion (XXV); Grey Cup champion (1995); James P. McCaffrey Trophy (1996); CFL All-Star (1996); CFL East All-Star (1996)

Tracy Gravely (born April 24, 1968) is a former all-star linebacker in the Canadian Football League (CFL).

A graduate of Concord University, where he was West Virginia Intercollegiate Athletic Conference Defensive Player of the Year in 1989, he signed with the New York Giants, but never played a game with them.

He came to Canada in 1991, playing briefly with the Ottawa Rough Riders. He was with the BC Lions during 1992 and 1993, playing 13 games. He joined the Baltimore CFLers in 1994 and won the Grey Cup with the Stallions in 1995, when he was a Southern Division all-star. He went north with the team when they became the Montreal Alouettes, and would play 112 games for them, being an all star in 1996 and winning the James P. McCaffrey Trophy for best defensive player in the East the same year.

Presently he is a football coach with his alma mater, Concord University and, in 2005, was chosen as a member of the Alouettes "Team of the Decade".
