= Blaine Schmidt =

Canadian football player (born 1963)

No. 54
- Position: Guard

Personal information
- Born: August 23, 1963 (age 63); Sudbury, Ontario, Canada
- Listed height: 6 ft 3 in (1.91 m)
- Listed weight: 285 lb (129 kg)

Career information
- University: Guelph Gryphons
- CFL draft: 1986: 2nd round, 17th overall pick

Career history
- 1986: Edmonton Eskimos
- 1987–1994: Toronto Argonauts
- 1995–1997: Hamilton Tiger-Cats

Awards and highlights
- Grey Cup champion (1991); CFL East All-Star (1996)

Blaine Schmidt (born August 23, 1963) is a Canadian former professional football guard who played twelve seasons in the Canadian Football League (CFL).

Schmidt played CIS football for the Guelph Gryphons.

He played professional football first for the Edmonton Eskimos in 1986, then played the bulk of his career with the Toronto Argonauts from 1987 to 1994, including winning the 79th Grey Cup in 1991. He finished his career playing for the Hamilton Tiger-Cats from 1995 to 1997, when he was named to the 1996 East Division All-Star team.

He retired from football in 1998 and now owns an automotive restoration shop in Erin, Ontario.
