= Lamar McGriggs =

American gridiron football player (born 1968)

No. 38, 37, 45, 36
- Positions: Safety, linebacker

Personal information
- Born: May 9, 1968 (age 58); Chicago, Illinois, U.S.
- Listed height: 6 ft 3 in (1.91 m)
- Listed weight: 213 lb (97 kg)

Career information
- High school: Thornton Township (Harvey, IL)
- College: Western Illinois
- NFL draft: 1991: 8th round, 223rd overall pick

Career history
- New York Giants (1991–1992); Minnesota Vikings (1993–1994); Ottawa Rough Riders (1996); Saskatchewan Roughriders (1997); Hamilton Tiger-Cats (1997–2000); Winnipeg Blue Bombers (2000-2005)

Awards and highlights
- Grey Cup champion (1999); CFL East All-Star (1996)

Career NFL statistics
- Tackles: 97
- Interceptions: 2
- Forced fumbles: 4
- Stats at Pro Football Reference

Lamar V. McGriggs (born May 9, 1968) is a former National Football League (NFL) and Canadian Football League (CFL) linebacker, having last played for the Winnipeg Blue Bombers. He was selected by the New York Giants in the eighth round of the 1991 NFL draft.

On February 22, 2006, McGriggs became a free agent after the Bombers declined their option on him. He won a Grey Cup championship in 1999 with the Hamilton Tiger-Cats.

McGriggs attended Thornton Township High School, Ellsworth Community College and Western Illinois University.
