= Eddie Brown (Canadian football) =

American gridiron football player (born 1966)

No. 88
- Positions: Wide receiver, Slotback

Personal information
- Born: August 6, 1966 (age 60); Sacramento, California, U.S.
- Listed height: 6 ft 0 in (1.83 m)
- Listed weight: 190 lb (86 kg)

Career information
- College: Iowa State

Career history
- 1990: Calgary Stampeders
- 1991: Ottawa Rough Riders
- 1992: Sacramento Surge
- 1992: Toronto Argonauts
- 1993–1995: Edmonton Eskimos
- 1995: Memphis Mad Dogs
- 1996–1997: Edmonton Eskimos
- 1998: Montreal Alouettes
- 1998–1999: BC Lions
- 2000: Toronto Argonauts
- 2000: Iowa Barnstormers
- 2002: Ottawa Renegades

Awards and highlights
- Grey Cup champion (1993); World Bowl champion (1992); CFL All-Star (1996); 2× CFL West All-Star (1996, 1999)

Career CFL statistics
- Receiving: 532 (Avg: 16.3 yds; TDs: 60; Lg: 78)
- Kickoff returns: 24 (Avg: 16.5 yds; TDs: 0; Lg: 27)
- Punt returns: 139 (Avg: 8.2 yds; TDs: 3; Lg: 92)
- Missed FG returns: 10 (Avg: 22.0 yds; TDs: 0; Lg: 44)
- Fumbles: 19

"Downtown" Eddie Brown (born August 6, 1966) is a former slotback in the Canadian Football League (CFL) between 1990 and 2002. Brown played with eight CFL teams, and appeared in two Grey Cup championships with the Edmonton Eskimos, winning the 81st Grey Cup in 1993.

In 1995, he played for the Memphis Mad Dogs. In 1996, after the demise of the Memphis Mad Dogs, he re-signed with the Edmonton Eskimos. In 1999, he played for the BC Lions.

In total he caught 532 passes for 8663 yards in 160 career CFL games with 63 touchdowns. Eddie had 3 1,000 yard seasons, all with Edmonton, and was a CFL All-Star in 1996 as well as Western All-Star in 1996 and 1999.

His shoestring catch in the snow of the 84th Grey Cup is considered to be one of the most memorable plays in Grey Cup history.
