= Mac Cody =

American gridiron football player (born 1972)

No. 7, 5, 10, 80, 82, 11
- Position: Wide receiver

Personal information
- Born: August 7, 1972 (age 54); St. Louis, Missouri, U.S.
- Listed height: 5 ft 11 in (1.80 m)
- Listed weight: 182 lb (83 kg)

Career information
- High school: Vashon (St. Louis)
- College: Memphis State
- NFL draft: 1994: undrafted

Career history
- Winnipeg Blue Bombers (1994)*; Indianapolis Colts (1994)*; Ottawa Rough Riders (1994); Birmingham Barracudas (1995); Hamilton Tiger-Cats (1996); Orlando Predators (1997); Montreal Alouettes (1998); St. Louis Rams (1999)*; Arizona Cardinals (1999–2000); Toronto Argonauts (2002)
- * Offseason or practice squad member only

Awards and highlights
- CFL West All-Star (1996); Tiger-Cats MOP (1996); Led CFL in receiving yards (1996)

Career NFL statistics
- Receptions: 23
- Receiving yards: 272
- Touchdowns: 1
- Stats at Pro Football Reference
- Stats at ArenaFan.com

Maclin Cody (born August 8, 1972) is an American former professional football player who was a wide receiver for two seasons with the Arizona Cardinals of the National Football League (NFL). He played college football for the Memphis State Tigers. He also played for the Ottawa Rough Riders, Birmingham Barracudas, Hamilton Tiger-Cats, Montreal Alouettes, and Toronto Argonauts of the Canadian Football League (CFL) and the Orlando Predators of the Arena Football League (AFL).

== Early life and college ==
Maclin Cody was born on August 8, 1972, in St. Louis, Missouri. He attended Vashon High School in St. Louis.

Cody was a three-year letterman for the Memphis State Tigers of Memphis State University from 1991 to 1993. He caught three passes for 31 yards in 1991 and 11 passes for 242 and three touchdowns in 1992. As a junior in 1993, he recorded 50 receptions for 606 yards and four touchdowns, and 13 kick returns for 429 yards and one touchdown. Cody's 33.0 yards per kick return was the highest among independents in 1993. After being ruled academically ineligible for his senior year, Cody entered the 1994 NFL draft.

== Professional career ==
After going undrafted, Cody signed with the Winnipeg Blue Bombers of the Canadian Football League (CFL) in late May 1994. On July 4, 1994, it was reported that he had been transferred to the team's reserve list.

On July 22, 1994, Cody was signed by the Indianapolis Colts of the National Football League (NFL). He was later released on August 16, 1994.

Cody signed with the Ottawa Rough Riders of the CFL on September 17, 1994. He dressed in two games for the Rough Riders during the 1994 season, totaling one reception for nine yards, 13 kickoff returns for 276 yards, and 13 punt returns for 100 yards. He was released by Ottawa on September 29, 1994.

Cody signed with the Birmingham Barracudas of the CFL on May 19, 1995. He dressed in 15 games for the Barracudas in 1995, catching 31 passes for 452 yards and three touchdowns while also returning 18 kickoffs for 334 yards and 26 punts for 278 yards.

On March 7, 1996, Cody was selected by the Hamilton Tiger-Cats in a dispersal draft after the Barracudas folded. He dressed in 17 games, all starts, for Hamilton during the 1996 season, recording 80 receptions for 1,426 yards and 11 touchdowns, 20 kickoff returns for 333 yards, and 17 punts for 123 yards. In 1996, Cody led the CFL in receiving yards, becoming the Tiger-Cats Most Outstanding Player and a West Division All-Star. He became a free agent after the 1996 season.

After not catching on with any NFL team in 1997, Cody signed with the Orlando Predators of the Arena Football League (AFL) in mid June 1997. He played in five games for the Predators during the 1997 AFL season, catching 16 passes for 204 yards and two touchdowns while also returning 19 kicks for 466 yards and three touchdowns and rushing once for a 38-yard touchdown. In September 1997, after the AFL season had ended, it was reported that Cody was being courted by several CFL teams, including the Tiger-Cats, Toronto Argonauts, and BC Lions. However, Cody's asking price was too high and his agent reportedly was still trying to land him a spot on an NFL practice squad.

Cody signed with the CFL's Montreal Alouettes on May 22, 1998. He dressed in 12 games for the Alouettes during the 1998 season, totaling 33 catches for 479 yards and five touchdowns, six kickoffs for 115 yards, and seven punt returns for 30 yards. He became a free agent after the 1998 season.

Cody was signed by the St. Louis Rams of the NFL on February 25, 1999. He was waived on September 5, 1999.

Cody was claimed off waivers by the Arizona Cardinals on September 6, 1999. He played in 13 games for the Cardinals in 1999, catching six passes for 60 yards and one touchdown on 11 targets. He also returned 32 punts for 373 yards and four kicks for 76 yards. Cody appeared in 15 games, starting one, during the 2000 season, recording 17 receptions for 212 yards on 27 targets, 31 punt returns for 222 yards, one kick return for 18 yards, four fumbles, and one fumble recovery. He was released by the Cardinals on February 19, 2001.

Cody signed with the Toronto Argonauts of the CFL on November 2, 2002. He dressed in one game for the Argonauts, returning five kickoffs for 133 yards and three punts for 35 yards, before being released on November 16, 2002.
