= Alfred Jordan (Canadian football) =

American gridiron football player (born 1970)

Profile
- Position: Defensive back

Personal information
- Born: February 25, 1970 (age 56); Washington, D.C.
- Listed height: 6 ft 1 in (1.85 m)
- Listed weight: 185 lb (84 kg)

Career information
- College: UCLA

Career history
- 1994: Las Vegas Posse
- 1995–1997: Calgary Stampeders

Alfred Jordan (born February 25, 1970) is an American former professional football cornerback who played in the Canadian Football League with the Las Vegas Posse and Calgary Stampeders.
