= Angelo Snipes =

American football player (born 1963)

No. 59, 52
- Position: Linebacker

Personal information
- Born: January 11, 1963 (age 63); Atlanta, Georgia, U.S.

Career information
- High school: Atlanta (GA) Walker
- College: West Georgia

Career history
- 1985: Oakland Invaders
- 1986: Washington Redskins
- 1986–1987: San Diego Chargers
- 1987–1989: Kansas City Chiefs
- 1991–1993: Ottawa Rough Riders
- 1994: BC Lions
- 1995: Birmingham Barracudas
- 1996: Winnipeg Blue Bombers

Awards and highlights
- Grey Cup champion (1994); James P. McCaffrey Trophy (1992); CFL All-Star (1992); CFL East All-Star (1992); CFL West All-Star (1996)
- Stats at Pro Football Reference

Angelo Bernard Snipes (born January 11, 1963) is an American former professional football linebacker in the United States Football League (USFL) for the Oakland Invaders, and the National Football League (NFL) for the Washington Redskins, San Diego Chargers, and Kansas City Chiefs. He later played six seasons in the Canadian Football League (CFL) for four teams. He played college football at the University of West Georgia.
