= Malvin Hunter =

American gridiron football player (born 1969)

Profile
- Positions: Linebacker, Defensive end

Personal information
- Born: November 20, 1969 (age 56); Harvey, Illinois, U.S.

Career information
- College: Wisconsin

Career history
- 1992: San Antonio Riders
- 1993–2000: Edmonton Eskimos

Awards and highlights
- Grey Cup champion (1993)

Career statistics
- Tackles: 370
- Sacks: 66
- Interceptions: 5

Malvin Hunter (born November 20, 1969) is a former American and Canadian football linebacker and defensive end in the World League of American Football (WLAF) and Canadian Football League (CFL). He played in the WLAF for the San Antonio Riders and the CFL for the Edmonton Eskimos. He played college football at Wisconsin.
