= Kenny Wilhite =

Canadian football player (born 1970)

Kenny Wilhite (born July 26, 1970) is a former Canadian football defensive back in the Canadian Football League who played for the Sacramento Gold Miners, San Antonio Texans, Ottawa Rough Riders, and Hamilton Tiger-Cats. He played college football for the Nebraska Cornhuskers.

He was on the coaching staff of the Nebraska Cornhuskers, before assuming the role of head football coach at Dakota Valley High School in South Dakota. Kenny now resides in Lincoln, Nebraska with his wife Dr. Holly Wilhite and two younger children.
