= K. D. Williams =

American football player (born 1973)

No. 59, 50, 44
- Position: Linebacker

Personal information
- Born: April 22, 1973 (age 53); Tampa, Florida, U.S.

Career information
- High school: Thomas Jefferson (Tampa)
- College: Henderson State

Career history
- Winnipeg Blue Bombers (1995–1996); Saskatchewan Roughriders (1997); Hamilton Tiger-Cats (1997); Frankfurt Galaxy (1998); Dallas Cowboys (1998)*; Kansas City Chiefs (1998)*; Oakland Raiders (1999); New Orleans Saints (2000)*; Green Bay Packers (2000–2001); Saskatchewan Roughriders (2002); Winnipeg Blue Bombers (2002)
- * Offseason or practice squad member only

Career statistics
- Tackles: 41
- Sacks: 1.5
- Interceptions: 1
- Stats at Pro Football Reference

Kevin Dewayne Williams Sr. (born April 22, 1973) is an American former professional football player who was a linebacker in the Canadian Football League (CFL), National Football League (NFL), and NFL Europe. He played college football for the Henderson State Reddies.

Williams is the birth father of ice hockey player Keegan Kolesar.
