= Allan Boyko =

Canadian gridiron football player (born 1967)

Profile
- Positions: Wide receiver, Kick returner

Personal information
- Born: March 2, 1967 (age 59); Hamilton, Ontario, Canada
- Listed height: 6 ft 2 in (1.88 m)
- Listed weight: 175 lb (79 kg)

Career information
- College: Western Michigan
- CFL draft: 1990: 3rd round, 19th overall pick

Career history
- 1991: Saskatchewan Roughriders
- 1993–1997: Winnipeg Blue Bombers

Allan Boyko (born March 2, 1967) is a Canadian former professional football player who played for the Saskatchewan Roughriders and Winnipeg Blue Bombers as a wide receiver and return specialist. Boyko caught 92 passes for 1,131 yards and 9 receiving touchdowns in his career. He also returned 182 punts for 996 yards and 36 kickoffs for 590 yards.
