= Grant Carter =

Canadian gridiron football player (born 1970)

Grant Carter (born September 30, 1970) is a former Canadian football defensive end and linebacker in the Canadian Football League (CFL) who played for the Baltimore CFL Colts, Montreal Alouettes, Winnipeg Blue Bombers, and Edmonton Eskimos. He played college football for the Pacific Tigers.
