= Paul Randolph (Canadian football) =

American gridiron football player and coach (born 1966)

Current position
- Title: Defensive line coach
- Team: Louisiana Tech
- Conference: Conference USA

Biographical details
- Born: June 22, 1966 (age 60); Gainesville, Georgia, U.S.
- Education: UT Martin

Playing career
- 1984–1987: UT Martin
- 1988–1995: Winnipeg Blue Bombers
- 1996–1997: Montreal Alouettes
- Position: Linebacker

Coaching career (HC unless noted)
- 1998: UT Martin (LB)
- 1999: Valdosta State (DL)
- 2000: Illinois State (DL/ST)
- 2001: Toledo (DL/ST)
- 2002: West Virginia (DL/ST)
- 2003–2005: Alabama (DE)
- 2006: Rice (AHC/DC/LB)
- 2007–2010: Tulsa (Co-DC/DL)
- 2011: Pittsburgh (Co-DC/DL)
- 2012–2014: Arizona State (Co-DC/DL)
- 2015: Arizona State (Associate AD)
- 2016–2018: Memphis (DL)
- 2019–2021: Texas Tech (DL)
- 2022–2023: Indiana (DL)
- 2024: Oklahoma State (DL)
- 2025–present: Louisiana Tech (DL)

Paul Randolph (born June 22, 1966) is a former Canadian football linebacker in the Canadian Football League who played for the Winnipeg Blue Bombers, and Montreal Alouettes. He played college football for the UT Martin Skyhawks.

In January 2022, Randolph joined the Indiana Hoosiers as the defensive line coach.
