= Rodney Harding =

American gridiron football player (born 1962)

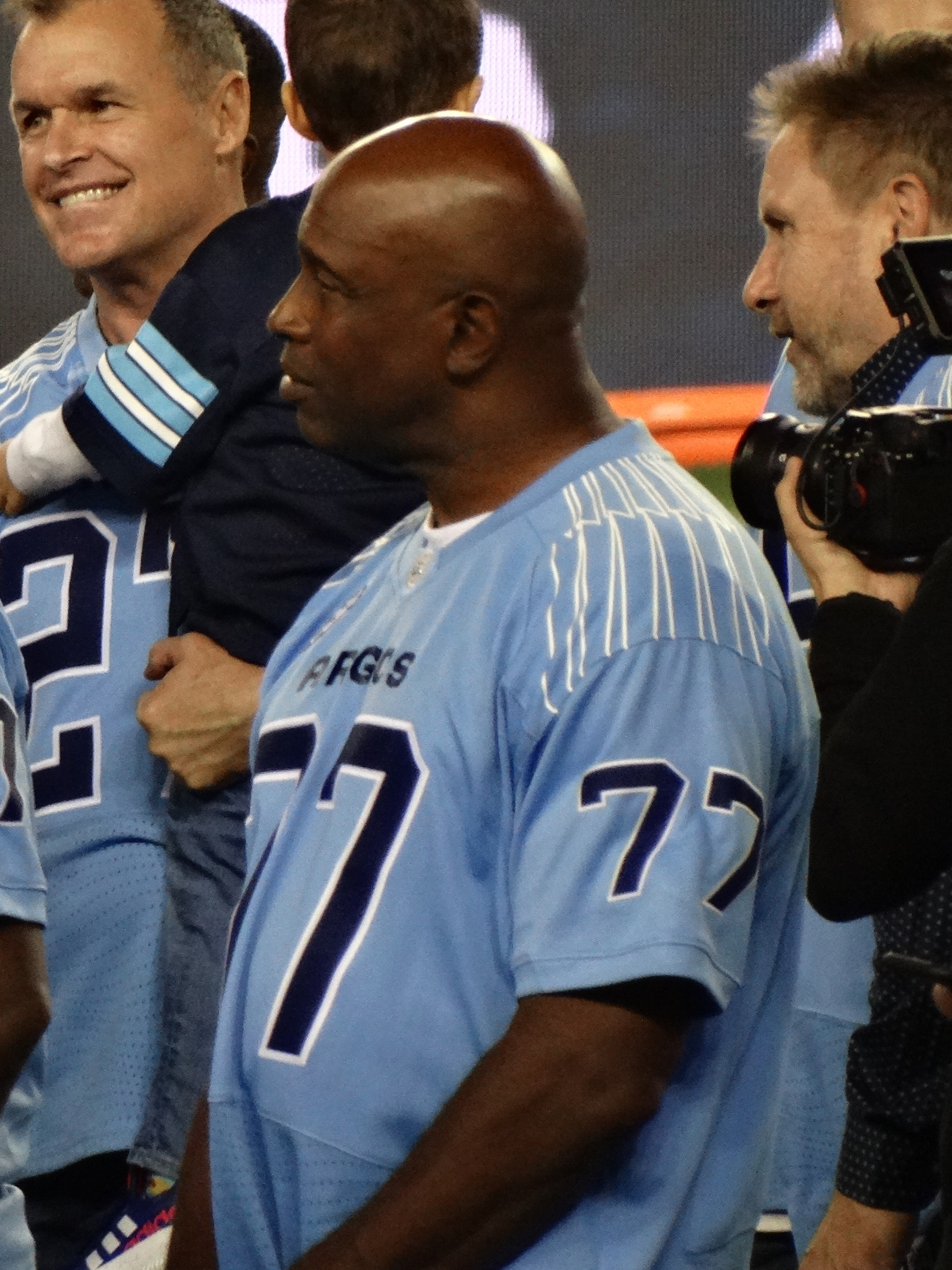
- Harding in 2023

No. 77
- Position: Defensive tackle

Personal information
- Born: August 1, 1962 (age 64); Oklahoma City, Oklahoma, U.S.

Career information
- College: Oklahoma State

Career history
- 1985–1994: Toronto Argonauts
- 1995: Memphis Mad Dogs
- 1996: Calgary Stampeders

Awards and highlights
- Grey Cup champion (1991); 2× CFL All-Star (1992, 1994); 2× CFL East All-Star (1992, 1994); CFL West All-Star (1996); First-team All-Big Eight (1984); Second-team All-Big Eight (1983); Records: Most QB sacks in a game (CFL): 5; Career QB sacks (Argonauts): 92
- Canadian Football Hall of Fame (Class of 2016)

Rodney Harding (born August 1, 1962) is a former professional defensive lineman in the Canadian Football League (CFL).

== College career ==
Harding played college football at Oklahoma State University.

== Professional career ==
Harding had a 12-year career in the Canadian Football League from 1985 to 1996, and he played mainly with the Toronto Argonauts, but ended his career with seasons at the Memphis Mad Dogs and Calgary Stampeders. He was a CFL All-Star two times. He was a part of the Argonauts 1991 Grey Cup winning team.

In 2016, he was inducted into the Canadian Football Hall of Fame.
