= 84th Grey Cup =

1996 Canadian Football championship game

Toronto Argonauts	Edmonton Eskimos
(15–3)	(11–7)
43	37
Head coach: Don Matthews	Head coach: Ron Lancaster
	1	2	3	4	Total
Toronto Argonauts	0	27	3	13	43
Edmonton Eskimos	9	14	0	14	37
- Date: November 24, 1996
- Stadium: Ivor Wynne Stadium
- Location: Hamilton
- Most Valuable Player: Doug Flutie, QB (Argonauts)
- Most Valuable Canadian: Mike Vanderjagt, K (Argonauts)
- Referee: Jake Ireland
- Attendance: 38,595

Broadcasters
- Network: CBC, RDS, ESPN2
- Announcers: (CBC) Steve Armitage, Chris Cuthbert, James Curry, David Archer, Mark Lee, Brian Williams, Scott Oake (ESPN2) Gord Miller, Danny Kepley, Miles Gorrell

The 84th Grey Cup, also known as The Snow Bowl, was the 1996 Grey Cup Canadian Football League championship game played between the Toronto Argonauts and the Edmonton Eskimos at Ivor Wynne Stadium in Hamilton, Ontario on November 24, 1996. The Argonauts won the game by a score of 43–37 in controversial fashion. Financial problems nearly impacted the game but Tim Hortons stepped in and provided the money needed to pay both teams' game bonuses.

== Game summary ==
Toronto Argonauts (43) - TDs, Jimmy Cunningham, Robert Drummond, Doug Flutie, Adrion Smith; FGs, Mike Vanderjagt (5); cons., Vanderjagt (4).

Edmonton Eskimos (37) - TDs, Eddie Brown, Jim Sandusky, Henry "Gizmo" Williams, Eric Blount, Marc Tolbert; cons., Sean Fleming (5); safety touch

First quarter
EDM—Safety Flutie concedes 3:37
EDM—TD Brown 64-yard pass from McManus (Fleming convert) 11:48
Second quarter
TOR—FG Vanderjagt 37-yard field goal 1:35
TOR—TD Cunningham 80-yard punt return (Vanderjagt convert) 2:59
TOR—FG Vanderjagt 32-yard field goal 7:09
EDM—TD Sandusky 75-yard pass from McManus (Fleming convert) 7:34
TOR—TD Drummond 1-yard run (Vanderjagt convert) 12:16
EDM—TD Williams 91-yard kickoff return (Fleming convert) 12:31
TOR—TD Flutie 10-yard run (Vanderjagt convert) 14:20
Third quarter
TOR—FG Vanderjagt 17-yard field goal 4:22
Fourth quarter
TOR—FG Vanderjagt 28-yard field goal 3:06
EDM—TD Blount 5-yard run (Fleming convert) 7:53
TOR—FG Vanderjagt 27-yard field goal 13:26
TOR—TD Smith 49-yard interception return (Vanderjagt convert) 13:38
EDM—TD Tolbert 7-yard pass from McManus (Fleming convert) 14:51

The temperature at game time was −10 °C, with 20 km/h winds and heavy snow. Tractors had to remove snow from the field prior to the game, as well as at halftime.

Edmonton had all the points in the first quarter on a safety touch conceded by Toronto quarterback Doug Flutie and a 64-yard touchdown pass from Danny McManus to Eddie Brown, a shoestring catch that slipped through his hands then bounced off his right thigh and left shin before he caught it on the fly. It is considered to be of the most memorable plays in Grey Cup history.

In the second quarter, Toronto's Mike Vanderjagt kicked a field goal and Jimmy Cunningham returned a punt 80 yards for a touchdown. Another Vanderjagt field goal put Toronto up 13–9. Edmonton regained the lead with a 75-yard pass and run from McManus to Jim Sandusky but lost it again when Robert Drummond scored for Toronto from the one. Edmonton's Henry "Gizmo" Williams reversed that in one play as he returned the kickoff 91 yards for the touchdown, a Grey Cup record that stood until the Eskimos' Tony Tompkins topped it with a 95-yard kickoff return in the 93rd Grey Cup. Flutie marched the Argos to the Edmonton 10 then ran in himself for the touchdown with 20 seconds left in the half to give Toronto the lead 27–23 at halftime, closing a quarter that saw the teams combine for 41 points.

Two Vanderjagt field goals were all the scoring in the first 23 minutes of the second half as Toronto receiver Cunningham dropped certain touchdown passes in the third and fourth quarters.

Edmonton cut the Toronto lead to 33–30 on Eric Blount's five-yard touchdown run with seven minutes remaining. But Flutie marched Toronto 71 yards, including a controversial third-down gamble in which Flutie fumbled the snap but was ruled not only to have retained possession but to have gained a first down. Their drive thus extended, the Argonauts increased their lead to 36–30 on Vanderjagt's 27-yard field goal at 13:26.

Toronto's Adrion Smith iced the win, returning a Danny McManus interception 49 yards for a touchdown with 1:22 remaining.

McManus hit Marc Tolbert with a seven-yard touchdown pass at 14:51 to round out the scoring at 43–37. A short kickoff attempt was recovered by Toronto to end any Edmonton comeback threat.

== 1996 CFL Playoffs ==
=== West Division ===
- Semi-final (November 10 @ Edmonton, Alberta)
  Edmonton Eskimos 68-7 Winnipeg Blue Bombers
- Final (November 17 @ Calgary, Alberta)
  Edmonton Eskimos 15-12 Calgary Stampeders

=== East Division ===
- Semi-final (November 9 @ Montreal, Quebec)
  Montreal Alouettes 22-11 Hamilton Tiger-Cats
- Final (November 16 @ Toronto, Ontario)
  Toronto Argonauts 43-7 Montreal Alouettes

== In popular culture ==
The game serves as a key plot point to a 2013 episode of the American TV series How I Met Your Mother. In the episode, teen idol Robin Sparkles derails her music career during the game's halftime show by unveiling her new grunge persona, Robin Daggers, which triggers her move to the United States, entry into journalism and joining the program's core cast. In reality, the halftime act for the contest was The Nylons.
