= 1995 Baltimore Stallions season =

- Owner: Jim Speros
- General manager: Jim Popp
- Head coach: Don Matthews
- Home stadium: Memorial Stadium

Results
- Record: 15–3
- Division place: 1st, South
- Playoffs: Won Grey Cup
- Team MVP: Mike Pringle
- Team ROY: Chris Wright

Uniform
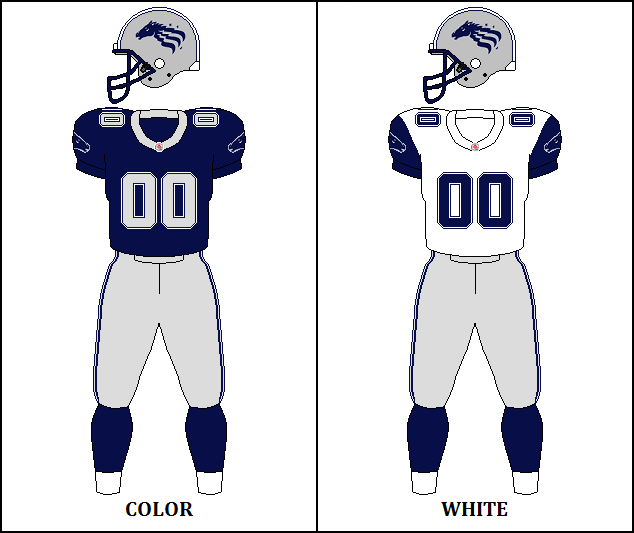

The 1995 Baltimore Stallions season was the second and final season in the history of the Baltimore CFL franchise. The team became the first (and to date, only) American-based football team to win the Grey Cup. Despite the Stallions success, attendance dropped. The club only sold 9,000 season tickets. The 1994 and 1995 Stallions radio flagship station was WJFK, 1300AM in Baltimore. Owned by Infinity Broadcasting, Bruce Cunningham of Fox45 TV served as play-by-play announcer, with former NFL Baltimore Colts stars Joe Washington, Bruce Laird, and Tom Matte providing analysis, and Mark Thoner of WLIF-FM as Producer.

As it turned out, the 83rd Grey Cup would be the last game the Stallions would ever play. A week before the Grey Cup, the Cleveland Browns announced they were moving to Baltimore. Owner Jim Speros balked at the prospect of competing with an NFL team and opted to move elsewhere. When it became apparent that the CFL was giving up its attempt to gain a foothold in the United States, he opted to move his team to Montreal as the Montreal Alouettes. In doing so, Speros canceled his franchise in Baltimore and revived the 1946–86 Alouettes franchise. As a result, the 1995 season is officially the last season of Stallions history, and the Stallions are officially one of only two Grey Cup champions in the modern era to fold.

== Preseason ==
Game	Date	Opponent	Results		Venue	Attendance
Game	Date	Opponent	Score	Record	Venue	Attendance
1	Sat, June 17	Ottawa Rough Riders	W 45–11	1–0	Memorial Stadium	20,642
2	Sat, June 24	Birmingham Barracudas	W 37–0	2–0	Miami Orange Bowl	20,216

== Regular season ==
- After the 1994 season, a name-the-team fan poll was held to decide a new team name. After the team's first week of the season being known as the Baltimore Football Club, the fan poll ended and Jim Speros announced to the Baltimore faithful that their team would be known as the Baltimore Stallions.
- Mike Pringle's rushing totals were 1,791 yards. Compared to his stats in the 1994 season, his yards-per-carry fell by .6 from 6.4 to 5.8. Despite the reduction, his statistics were still the best any back posted in the CFL that year.

=== Season standings ===
South Division
Pos	Team	Pld	W	L	T	PF	PA	PD	Pts	Div	Stk
1	Baltimore Stallions (Q)	18	15	3	0	541	369	172	30	6–1	W10
2	San Antonio Texans (Q)	18	12	6	0	630	457	173	24	5–3	W3
3	Birmingham Barracudas (Q)	18	10	8	0	548	518	30	20	3–4	L2
4	Memphis Mad Dogs	18	9	9	0	346	364	−18	18	4–3	L1
5	Shreveport Pirates	18	5	13	0	465	514	−49	10	0–8	L2

Source: "CFL.ca". Archived from the original on July 15, 2009.
(Q) Qualified for playoffs

=== Season schedule ===
Week	Game	Date	Opponent	Results		Venue	Attendance
Week	Game	Date	Opponent	Score	Record	Venue	Attendance
1	1	Fri, June 30	at BC Lions	L 34–37	0–1	BC Place	23,999
2	2	Sat, July 8	San Antonio Texans	W 50–24	1–1	Memorial Stadium	31,016
3	3	Sat, July 15	at San Antonio Texans	W 28–23	2–1	Alamodome	18,112
4	4	Sat, July 22	Winnipeg Blue Bombers	W 43–7	3–1	Memorial Stadium	30,641
5	5	Sat, July 29	at Birmingham Barracudas	W 36–8	4–1	Legion Field	30,729
6	6	Wed, Aug 2	at Edmonton Eskimos	W 19–12	5–1	Commonwealth Stadium	30,698
6	7	Sun, Aug 6	at Calgary Stampeders	L 15–29	5–2	McMahon Stadium	24,463
7	8	Sat, Aug 12	Memphis Mad Dogs	L 15–25	5–3	Memorial Stadium	31,221
8	9	Sat, Aug 19	at Memphis Mad Dogs	W 16–13	6–3	Liberty Bowl Memorial Stadium	18,249
9	10	Sat, Aug 26	Toronto Argonauts	W 41–14	7–3	Memorial Stadium	27,853
10	11	Sat, Sept 2	at Hamilton Tiger-Cats	W 41–14	8–3	Ivor Wynne Stadium	23,120
11	12	Sat, Sept 9	Birmingham Barracudas	W 28–20	9–3	Memorial Stadium	29,013
12	13	Fri, Sept 15	at Shreveport Pirates	W 24–17	10–3	Independence Stadium	12,445
13	14	Sat, Sept 23	Shreveport Pirates	W 42–32	11–3	Memorial Stadium	27,321
14	15	Sun, Oct 1	at Saskatchewan Roughriders	W 28–24	12–3	Taylor Field	30,738
15	16	Sat, Oct 7	Saskatchewan Roughriders	W 29–27	13–3	Memorial Stadium	31,421
16	Bye						
17	17	Sat, Oct 21	BC Lions	W 28–26	14–3	Memorial Stadium	33,208
18	18	Sun, Oct 29	Hamilton Tiger-Cats	W 24–17	15–3	Memorial Stadium	29,310

== Playoffs ==
Mike Pringle ran for 484 playoff yards and four touchdowns in three games. The result was that the Baltimore Stallions made their second straight appearance in the Grey Cup.

Round	Date	Opponent	Results		Venue	Attendance
Round	Date	Opponent	Score	Record	Venue	Attendance
South Semi-Final	Sat, Nov 4	Winnipeg Blue Bombers	W 36–21	1–0	Memorial Stadium	21,040
South Final	Sun, Nov 12	San Antonio Texans	W 21–11	2–0	Memorial Stadium	30,217
83rd Grey Cup	Sun, Nov 19	Calgary Stampeders	W 37–20	3–0	Taylor Field	52,564

=== Grey Cup ===
The 83rd Grey Cup was played between the Baltimore Stallions and the Calgary Stampeders at Taylor Field in Regina, Saskatchewan. The Stallions won the game by a score of 37–20. It marked the only time that an American-based team won the Grey Cup. Not one television station from Baltimore sent a crew to Regina to cover the Grey Cup game. Only 200 fans showed up for the Stallions Grey Cup celebration. As for the Grey Cup game itself, Chris Wright scored a then CFL record 82 yard punt return touchdown. The aforementioned record stood until the 2018 Grey Cup, with Terry Williams returning a punt for 97 yards to conclude the first half.

== Roster ==
1995 Baltimore Stallions final roster
Quarterbacks: 13 Dan Crowley; 8 Tracy Ham; 10 Shawn Jones; Running backs: 2 Robert Drummond; 29 Louis Fite; 27 Mike Pringle; 32 Peter Tuipulotu; 28 Chris Wright; Receivers: 80 Gerald Alphin; 81 Chris Armstrong; 86 Robert Clark; 84 Mike Cook; 1 Shannon Culver; 16 Reggie Perry	Offensive linemen: 64 Mark Dixon G/T; 63 John Earle G; 66 Neal Fort T; 61 John James G; 62 Bob Meeks C; 68 Shar Pourdanesh T; 51 Nick Subis C; 65 Mike Withycombe G; Defensive linemen: 98 Jearld Baylis DT; 57 O. J. Brigance DE; 54 Grant Carter DE; 69 Rob Davis DT/LS; 58 Reggie Givens DE; 99 Demetrious Maxie DT; 56 Elfrid Payton DE; 95 Willie Whitehead DT	Linebackers: 38 Ken Benson; 14 Jason Bryant; 39 Matt Goodwin; 31 Maurice Gravely; 7 Tracy Gravely; 4 Alvin Walton; Defensive backs: 9 Charles Anthony; 35 Kareem Bacon; 17 Doug Craft; 25 Courtney Griffin; 21 Irvin Smith; 36 Les Smith; 33 Ken Watson; Special teams: 6 Carlos Huerta K; 22 Josh Miller P/K; Italics indicate American player

== Awards and honors ==
After the season, other Baltimore Stallions' received awards and accomplishments in the CFL, which are:

Divisional Awards

- Most Valuable Player of the East Division – Mike Pringle (RB)
- Most Outstanding Rookie of the East Division – Chris Wright (WR)
- Most Outstanding Offensive Lineman Award of the East Division – Mike Withycombe (OG)

CFL awards

- CFL's Most Outstanding Player Award – Mike Pringle (RB)
- CFL's Most Outstanding Offensive Lineman Award – Mike Withycombe (OG)
- CFL's Coach of the Year – Don Matthews
- Grey Cup's Most Valuable Player – Tracy Ham (QB)

1995 Southern All-Stars

Offense

- Mike Pringle (RB)
- Chris Armstrong (SB)
- Mike Withycombe (OG)
- Shar Pourdanesh (OT)
- Neal Fort (OT)

Defense

- Jerald Baylis (DT)
- Elfrid Payton (DE)
- Tracy Gravely (LB)
- O. J. Brigance (LB)
- Irvin Smith (CB)
- Charles Anthony (DB)

Special Teams

- Josh Miller (P)
- Chris Wright (ST)

1995 CFL All-Stars

Offense

- Mike Pringle (RB)
- Mike Withycombe (OG)
- Neal Fort (OT)

Defense

- Jerald Baylis (DT)
- O. J. Brigance (LB)
- Irvin Smith (CB)
- Charles Anthony (DB)

Special Teams

- Josh Miller (P)
- Chris Wright (ST)

== Relocation to Montreal ==
In late 1995, Cleveland Browns owner Art Modell announced his intention to relocate his NFL club to Baltimore, where they would be rechristened the Baltimore Ravens. This would have made the Stallions the only CFL club ever to directly compete with the NFL, whose season overlaps with the last three months of the CFL season.

In late November, Jim Speros had a Save our Stallions campaign, with January 5 as the deadline to sell 20,000 season tickets. It was revealed that the team was $800,000 in debt.

Stallions owner Jim Speros realized that despite the Stallions' popularity, they could not possibly compete with the NFL. After deals with Norfolk, Virginia and Houston fell through, Speros moved the Stallions to Montreal and revived the old Alouettes name for the 1996 season.
