= 1995 Saskatchewan Roughriders season =

CFL team season

- General manager: Alan Ford
- Head coach: Ray Jauch
- Home stadium: Taylor Field

Results
- Record: 6–12
- Division place: 6th, North
- Playoffs: did not qualify
- Team MOP: Don Narcisse
- Team MOC: Ray Elgaard
- Team MOR: Troy Alexander

The 1995 Saskatchewan Roughriders finished in sixth place in the North Division with a 6–12 record and failed to make the playoffs. This season represented the first time that Regina hosted the Grey Cup, when the city hosted the 83rd championship game. As a result, temporary seating was installed, which led to the largest attendance at a regular season game, 55,438, against the visiting Calgary Stampeders.

== Offseason ==
=== CFL draft ===
Round	Pick	Player	Position	School
0	4	Troy Alexander	LB	Eastern Washington
1	10	Dwayne Provo	DB	Saint Mary's
1	12	Rob Lazeo	OT	Western Illinois
2	23	Gene Makowsky	OL	Saskatchewan
2	24	Brian Yorston	DT	Middle Tennessee
4	38	Gerry Smith	LB	Wilfrid Laurier
6	51	Brent Schneider	QB	Saskatchewan

== Preseason ==
Game	Date	Opponent	Results		Venue	Attendance
Game	Date	Opponent	Score	Record	Venue	Attendance
A	Fri, June 16	vs. Winnipeg Blue Bombers	L 27–30	0–1	Taylor Field	27,203
B	Sat, June 24	at Toronto Argonauts	L 23–43	0–2	SkyDome	13,222

== Regular season ==
=== Season standings ===
North Division
Pos	Team	Pld	W	L	T	PF	PA	PD	Pts	Div	Stk
1	Calgary Stampeders (Q)	18	15	3	0	631	404	227	30	9–2	L1
2	Edmonton Eskimos (Q)	18	13	5	0	599	359	240	26	9–3	W6
3	BC Lions (Q)	18	10	8	0	535	470	65	20	7–6	W1
4	Hamilton Tiger-Cats (Q)	18	8	10	0	427	509	−82	16	5–4	L2
5	Winnipeg Blue Bombers (Q)	18	7	11	0	404	653	−249	14	5–7	W2
6	Saskatchewan Roughriders	18	6	12	0	422	451	−29	12	5–7	L2
7	Toronto Argonauts	18	4	14	0	376	519	−143	8	3–9	W1
8	Ottawa Rough Riders	18	3	15	0	348	685	−337	6	3–8	L1

Source: "CFL.ca". Archived from the original on 2009-07-15.
(Q) Qualified for playoffs

=== Season schedule ===
Week	Game	Date	Opponent	Results		Venue	Attendance
Week	Game	Date	Opponent	Score	Record	Venue	Attendance
1	1	Fri, June 30	vs. Hamilton Tiger-Cats	L 16–37	0–1	Taylor Field	23,396
2	2	Fri, July 7	vs. Edmonton Eskimos	L 19–26 (OT)	0–2	Taylor Field	23,584
3	3	Fri, July 14	at Memphis Mad Dogs	L 5–11	0–3	Liberty Bowl Memorial Stadium	11,748
4	4	Sat, July 22	at Birmingham Barracudas	L 14–24	0–4	Legion Field	25,321
5	5	Sun, July 30	vs. San Antonio Texans	L 15–36	0–5	Taylor Field	22,215
6	6	Fri, Aug 4	at Ottawa Rough Riders	W 31–20	1–5	Frank Clair Stadium	20,830
7	7	Wed, Aug 9	vs. BC Lions	L 25–43	1–6	Taylor Field	20,421
8	8	Fri, Aug 18	at Edmonton Eskimos	L 13–32	1–7	Commonwealth Stadium	30,204
9	9	Wed, Aug 23	vs. Ottawa Rough Riders	W 31–16	2–7	Taylor Field	21,615
10	10	Sun, Sept 3	vs. Winnipeg Blue Bombers	W 56–4	3–7	Taylor Field	31,308
11	11	Sun, Sept 10	at Winnipeg Blue Bombers	L 24–25	3–8	Winnipeg Stadium	24,698
12	12	Sun, Sept 17	vs. Memphis Mad Dogs	W 34–32	4–8	Taylor Field	27,787
13	13	Sat, Sept 23	at Toronto Argonauts	W 30–23	5–8	SkyDome	14,655
14	14	Sun, Oct 1	vs. Baltimore Stallions	L 20–24	5–9	Taylor Field	30,738
15	15	Sat, Oct 7	at Baltimore Stallions	L 27–29	5–10	Memorial Stadium	31,421
16	16	Sat, Oct 14	vs. Calgary Stampeders	W 25–20	6–10	Taylor Field	55,438
17	17	Sun, Oct 22	at Calgary Stampeders	L 15–18	6–11	McMahon Stadium	33,258
18	18	Sat, Oct 28	at BC Lions	L 25–30	6–12	BC Place	27,464

== Roster ==
1995 Saskatchewan Roughriders final roster
Quarterbacks: 12 Tom Burgess; 6 Warren Jones; 7 Heath Rylance; Running backs: 27 Robert Mimbs; 26 David Pitcher; 35 Rick Walters; Receivers: 15 Bruce Boyko; 81 Ray Elgaard; 10 Dan Farthing; 8 Jamie Holland; 87 Joey Jauch; 80 Don Narcisse	Offensive linemen: 66 Mike Anderson C; 63 Scott Hendrickson G/C; 58 Michel Lamy T/G; 60 Gene Makowsky G; 57 Dan Payne T; 65 Peter Shorts T; 61 Paul Vajda G; Defensive linemen: 46 Troy Alexander DE; 93 Tim Edwards NT; 71 Bobby Jurasin DE; 68 Glenn Kulka NT; 98 Lybrant Robinson DE	Linebackers: 97 Brooks Findlay; 47 Ron Goetz; 74 Dan Rashovich; 41 Gary Rogers; Defensive backs: 3 Errol Brown; 24 Ventson Donelson; 21 Dale Joseph; 1 Dwayne Provo; 22 Brian Randell; 33 Aaron Ruffin; 2 Terryl Ulmer; 17 Dave Van Belleghem	Special teams: 13 Brent Matich P; 4 Paul McCallum K; 36 Dave Ridgway K; Injured list: 64 Wayne Drinkwalter NT; 20 Darren Joseph RB; 86 Elbert Turner WR; Italics indicate American player

== Awards and records ==
=== 1995 CFL All-Stars ===
- Don Narcisse, wide receiver

=== Northern All-Star selections ===
- Don Narcisse, wide receiver
