= 1995 Hamilton Tiger-Cats season =

Season of Canadian Football League team the Hamilton Tiger-Cats

- Head coach: Don Sutherin
- Home stadium: Ivor Wynne Stadium

Results
- Record: 8–10
- Division place: 4th, North
- Playoffs: Lost North Semi-Final
- Team MOP: Earl Winfield
- Team MOC: Michael O'Shea
- Team MOR: Rob Hitchcock

The 1995 Hamilton Tiger-Cats season was the 38th season for the team in the Canadian Football League (CFL) and their 46th overall. The Tiger-Cats finished in fourth place in the North Division with an 8–10 record. They appeared in a North Semi-Final game but lost to the Calgary Stampeders. It was Hamilton's first ever post-season meeting with the Stampeders, as well as the only non-Grey Cup postseason game in the history of professional Canadian football to be played between teams that did not face one another in the regular season.

== Offseason ==
=== CFL draft ===
Round	Pick	Player	Position	School
1	1	Tom Nütten	OL	Western Michigan
2	9	John Murphy	OL	Morningside
3	17	Rob Hitchcock	LB	Weber State
3	20	Jude St. John	OL	Western Ontario
5	32	Charles Assman	DB	Guelph
6	40	Kip Wigmore	WR	Guelph
7	48	Mark Holmstrom	TE	McMaster

== Preseason ==
Game	Date	Opponent	Results		Venue	Attendance
Game	Date	Opponent	Score	Record	Venue	Attendance
A	Thu, June 15	vs. Toronto Argonauts	W 33–17	1–0	Ivor Wynne Stadium	18,266
B	Thu, June 22	at Winnipeg Blue Bombers	L 23–30	1–1	Winnipeg Stadium	26,000

== Regular season ==
=== Season standings ===
North Division
Pos	Team	Pld	W	L	T	PF	PA	PD	Pts	Div	Stk
1	Calgary Stampeders (Q)	18	15	3	0	631	404	227	30	9–2	L1
2	Edmonton Eskimos (Q)	18	13	5	0	599	359	240	26	9–3	W6
3	BC Lions (Q)	18	10	8	0	535	470	65	20	7–6	W1
4	Hamilton Tiger-Cats (Q)	18	8	10	0	427	509	−82	16	5–4	L2
5	Winnipeg Blue Bombers (Q)	18	7	11	0	404	653	−249	14	5–7	W2
6	Saskatchewan Roughriders	18	6	12	0	422	451	−29	12	5–7	L2
7	Toronto Argonauts	18	4	14	0	376	519	−143	8	3–9	W1
8	Ottawa Rough Riders	18	3	15	0	348	685	−337	6	3–8	L1

Source: "CFL.ca". Archived from the original on 2009-07-15.
(Q) Qualified for playoffs

=== Schedule ===
Week	Game	Date	Opponent	Results		Venue	Attendance
Week	Game	Date	Opponent	Score	Record	Venue	Attendance
1	1	Fri, June 30	at Saskatchewan Roughriders	W 37–16	1–0	Taylor Field	23,396
2	2	Sat, July 8	vs. Birmingham Barracudas	W 31–13	2–0	Ivor Wynne Stadium	23,042
3	3	Sat, July 15	at Birmingham Barracudas	L 28–51	2–1	Legion Field	31,185
4	4	Mon, July 24	vs. Memphis Mad Dogs	L 21–23	2–2	Ivor Wynne Stadium	20,324
5	5	Fri, July 28	vs. Edmonton Eskimos	L 18–26	2–3	Ivor Wynne Stadium	20,104
6	6	Thurs, Aug 3	at Toronto Argonauts	W 20–16	3–3	SkyDome	19,174
7	7	Fri, Aug 11	vs. Shreveport Pirates	W 30–20	4–3	Ivor Wynne Stadium	20,182
8	8	Sat, Aug 19	vs. San Antonio Texans	W 35–31	5–3	Ivor Wynne Stadium	20,520
9	9	Fri, Aug 25	at Winnipeg Blue Bombers	W 36–33	6–3	Winnipeg Stadium	22,211
10	10	Sat, Sept 2	vs. Baltimore Stallions	L 14–41	6–4	Ivor Wynne Stadium	23,120
11	11	Sat, Sept 9	vs. Toronto Argonauts	W 33–27	7–4	Ivor Wynne Stadium	24,820
12	12	Sat, Sept 16	at BC Lions	L 14–49	7–5	BC Place	25,432
13	13	Sat, Sept 23	at San Antonio Texans	L 7–45	7–6	Alamodome	14,614
14	14	Fri, Sept 29	vs. Winnipeg Blue Bombers	L 20–24	7–7	Ivor Wynne Stadium	20,727
15	15	Sat, Oct 7	at Shreveport Pirates	L 14–26	7–8	Independence Stadium	12,619
16	16	Sun, Oct 15	vs. BC Lions	W 43–14	8–8	Ivor Wynne Stadium	23,112
17	17	Sat, Oct 21	at Ottawa Rough Riders	L 9–30	8–9	Frank Clair Stadium	17,160
18	18	Sun, Oct 29	at Baltimore Stallions	L 17–24	8–10	Memorial Stadium	29,310

== Postseason ==
Round	Date	Opponent	Results		Venue	Attendance
Round	Date	Opponent	Score	Record	Venue	Attendance
North Semi-Final	Sat, Nov 4	at Calgary Stampeders	L 13–31	0–1	McMahon Stadium	16,026

== Roster ==
1995 Hamilton Tiger-Cats final roster
Quarterbacks: 13 Anthony Calvillo; 12 Mike Kerrigan; 9 Steve Taylor; Running backs: 22 Brad Elberg; 19 Derrick McAdoo; 29 Dean Noel; Receivers: 89 Andrew Grigg; 81 Manny Hazard; 25 Lee Knight; 82 Frank Marof; 83 Kelvin Means; 85 Richard Nurse; 88 Larry Thompson; 1 Earl Winfield; 21 Wally Zatylny	Offensive linemen: 55 Doug Davies C; 51 David Richardson T; 56 Dale Sanderson G; 66 Blaine Schmidt G; 57 Val St. Germain T; 61 Jude St. John G; Defensive linemen: 58 Lou Cafazzo DT; 98 Mike Campbell DT; 96 Keith Embray DE; 91 Carlos Fowler DT; 99 Mike Philbrick DT; 97 Jessie Small DE	Linebackers: 90 Pete Giftopoulos; 7 Hassan Bailey; 42 Rob Hitchcock; 59 Mike O'Shea; Defensive backs: 2 Eric Carter; 5 Keita Crespina; 20 Derek Grier; 17 Garry Lewis; 26 Brian McCurdy; 16 Don Robinson; 31 Sam Rogers; Special teams: 3 Paul Osbaldiston K/P	Injured list: 78 Tony Bailey DE; 52 Tim Brown LB; 94 Steve Grant DT; 24 Kalin Hall RB; 15 Roger Hennig DB; 8 Hank Ilesic P; 80 Barry Rose WR; Italics indicate American players
