= 1995 Memphis Mad Dogs season =

- Owner: Fred Smith
- General manager: Steve Erhart
- Head coach: Pepper Rodgers
- Home stadium: Liberty Bowl Memorial Stadium

Results
- Record: 9–9
- Division place: 4th, South
- Playoffs: Did not qualify

Uniform
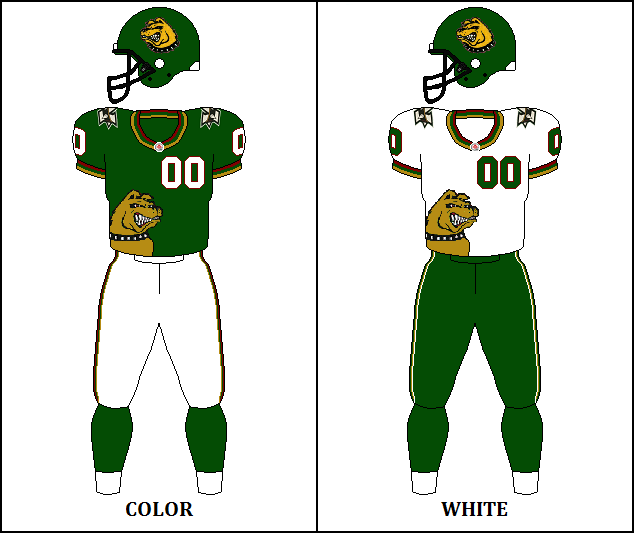

The 1995 Memphis Mad Dogs season was the first and only season in the franchise's history. Memphis finished fourth in the South Division with a 9–9 record but missed the playoffs.

== Preseason ==
Game	Date	Opponent	Results		Venue	Attendance
Game	Date	Opponent	Score	Record	Venue	Attendance
A	Sat, June 17	San Antonio Texans	L 14–35	0–1	Liberty Bowl Memorial Stadium	13,454
B	Thu, June 22	at Ottawa Rough Riders	W 28–21	1–1	Frank Clair Stadium	19,696

== Regular season ==
=== Season standings ===
South Division
Pos	Team	Pld	W	L	T	PF	PA	PD	Pts	Div	Stk
1	Baltimore Stallions (Q)	18	15	3	0	541	369	172	30	6–1	W10
2	San Antonio Texans (Q)	18	12	6	0	630	457	173	24	5–3	W3
3	Birmingham Barracudas (Q)	18	10	8	0	548	518	30	20	3–4	L2
4	Memphis Mad Dogs	18	9	9	0	346	364	−18	18	4–3	L1
5	Shreveport Pirates	18	5	13	0	465	514	−49	10	0–8	L2

Source: "CFL.ca". Archived from the original on 2009-07-15.
(Q) Qualified for playoffs

=== Season schedule ===
Week	Game	Date	Opponent	Results		Venue	Attendance
Week	Game	Date	Opponent	Score	Record	Venue	Attendance
1	1	Thurs, June 29	at Calgary Stampeders	L 18–24	0–1	McMahon Stadium	25,071
2	2	Fri, July 7	BC Lions	L 13–31	0–2	Liberty Bowl Memorial Stadium	14,278
3	3	Fri, July 14	Saskatchewan Roughriders	W 11–5	1–2	Liberty Bowl Memorial Stadium	11,748
4	4	Wed, July 19	at Ottawa Rough Riders	W 23–20	2–2	Frank Clair Stadium	21,221
4	5	Mon, July 24	at Hamilton Tiger-Cats	W 23–21	3–2	Ivor Wynne Stadium	20,324
5	6	Sat, July 29	Toronto Argonauts	L 7–10 (OT)	3–3	Liberty Bowl Memorial Stadium	20,183
6	7	Sat, Aug 5	at San Antonio Texans	L 9–24	3–4	Alamodome	15,557
7	8	Sat, Aug 12	at Baltimore Stallions	W 25–15	4–4	Memorial Stadium	31,221
8	9	Sat, Aug 19	Baltimore Stallions	L 13–16	4–5	Liberty Bowl Memorial Stadium	18,249
9	10	Sat, Aug 26	San Antonio Texans	L 6–26	4–6	Liberty Bowl Memorial Stadium	16–223
10	11	Sun, Sept 3	at Shreveport Pirates	W 31–22	5–6	Independence Stadium	17,593
11	12	Sun, Sept 10	Shreveport Pirates	W 22–21	6–6	Liberty Bowl Memorial Stadium	10,198
12	13	Sun, Sept 17	at Saskatchewan Roughriders	L 32–34	6–7	Taylor Field	27,787
13	14	Sun, Sept 24	Birmingham Barracudas	W 28–19	7-7	Liberty Bowl Memorial Stadium	7,830
14	Bye						
15	15	Sun, Oct 8	Ottawa Rough Riders	W 26–7	8-7	Liberty Bowl Memorial Stadium	12,437
16	16	Fri, Oct 13	at Edmonton Eskimos	L 17–34	8-8	Commonwealth Stadium	30,111
17	17	Fri, Oct 20	at Toronto Argonauts	W 28–10	9-8	Skydome	14,122
18	18	Thurs, Oct 26	Edmonton Eskimos	L 14–25	9-9	Liberty Bowl Memorial Stadium	12,078

== Awards and honors ==
=== CFL All-Stars ===
- Tim Cofield (DE)

=== CFL Southern All-Stars ===
Offense

- Joe Horn (WR)

Defense

- Rodney Harding (DT)
- Tim Cofield (DE)
- Donald Smith (CB)
