= 1995 BC Lions season =

Canadian football team season

- Owner: Bill Comrie
- General manager: Eric Tillman; Dave Ritchie
- Head coach: Dave Ritchie
- Home stadium: BC Place Stadium

Results
- Record: 10–8
- Division place: 3rd, North
- Playoffs: Lost North Semi-Final

The 1995 BC Lions finished in third place in the North Division with a 10–8 record. They appeared in the North semi-final but were defeated by the Edmonton Eskimos, denying the team a chance to defend their Grey Cup title.

== Offseason ==
=== CFL draft ===
Round	Pick	Player	Position	School
1	8	Mark Hatfield	OT	Bishop's
2	16	Brian Conlan	OT	British Columbia
5	47	Larry Jusdanis	QB	Acadia
6	55	Ian Crawford	WR	Bishop's

== Preseason ==
Game	Date	Opponent	Results		Venue	Attendance
Game	Date	Opponent	Score	Record	Venue	Attendance
A	Tue, June 13	at Edmonton Eskimos	L 22–23	0–1	Commonwealth Stadium	39,293
A	Sat, June 17	vs. Calgary Stampeders	W 36–18	1–1	BC Place	21,301

== Regular season ==
=== Season standings ===
North Division
Pos	Team	Pld	W	L	T	PF	PA	PD	Pts	Div	Stk
1	Calgary Stampeders (Q)	18	15	3	0	631	404	227	30	9–2	L1
2	Edmonton Eskimos (Q)	18	13	5	0	599	359	240	26	9–3	W6
3	BC Lions (Q)	18	10	8	0	535	470	65	20	7–6	W1
4	Hamilton Tiger-Cats (Q)	18	8	10	0	427	509	−82	16	5–4	L2
5	Winnipeg Blue Bombers (Q)	18	7	11	0	404	653	−249	14	5–7	W2
6	Saskatchewan Roughriders	18	6	12	0	422	451	−29	12	5–7	L2
7	Toronto Argonauts	18	4	14	0	376	519	−143	8	3–9	W1
8	Ottawa Rough Riders	18	3	15	0	348	685	−337	6	3–8	L1

(Q) Qualified for playoffs

=== Season schedule ===
Week	Game	Date	Opponent	Results		Venue	Attendance
Week	Game	Date	Opponent	Score	Record	Venue	Attendance
1	1	Fri, June 30	vs. Baltimore Stallions	W 37–34	1–0	BC Place	23,999
2	2	Fri, July 7	at Memphis Mad Dogs	W 31–13	2–0	Liberty Bowl Memorial Stadium	14,278
3	3	Thu, July 13	vs. Toronto Argonauts	W 35–34	3–0	BC Place	24,276
4	4	Fri, July 21	at Calgary Stampeders	L 24–46	3–1	McMahon Stadium	30,012
5	5	Thu, July 27	vs. Ottawa Rough Riders	W 48–11	4–1	BC Place	22,226
6	6	Thu, Aug 3	vs. Birmingham Barracudas	W 30–23 (OT)	5–1	BC Place	21,948
7	7	Wed, Aug 9	at Saskatchewan Roughriders	W 43–25	6–1	Taylor Field	20,421
7	8	Mon, Aug 14	at Toronto Argonauts	W 19–6	7–1	SkyDome	17,084
8	9	Fri, Aug 18	at Winnipeg Blue Bombers	L 6–11	7–2	Winnipeg Stadium	22,769
9	10	Sat, Aug 26	vs. Shreveport Pirates	L 19–20	7–3	BC Place	24,535
10	Bye						
11	11	Sat, Sept 9	at Ottawa Rough Riders	W 43–24	8–3	Frank Clair Stadium	22,564
12	12	Sat, Sept 16	vs. Hamilton Tiger-Cats	W 49–14	9–3	BC Place	25,432
13	13	Fri, Sept 22	vs. Edmonton Eskimos	L 18–33	9–4	BC Place	32,837
14	14	Sun, Oct 1	at Edmonton Eskimos	L 36–39	9–5	Commonwealth Stadium	30,046
15	15	Mon, Oct 9	vs. Calgary Stampeders	L 27–41	9–6	BC Place	32,907
16	16	Sun, Oct 15	at Hamilton Tiger-Cats	L 13–43	9–7	Ivor Wynne Stadium	23,112
17	17	Sat, Oct 21	at Baltimore Stallions	L 26–28	9–8	Memorial Stadium	33,208
18	18	Sat, Oct 28	vs. Saskatchewan Roughriders	W 30–25	10–8	BC Place	27,464

== Roster ==
1995 BC Lions final roster
Quarterbacks: 2 Giulio Caravatta K; 14 Danny McManus; 12 Erik White; Running backs: 19 Paul Blackwood; 6 Cory Philpot; Receivers: 85 Matt Clark; 82 Darren Flutie; 84 Bob Gordon; 16 Spencer McLennan; 89 Yo Murphy; 80 Trevor Shaw	Offensive linemen: 59 Todd Furdyk T; 68 Cory Mantyka G; 66 Jim Mills T; 64 Garry Sawatzky G/T; 55 Ian Sinclair C; 60 Jamie Taras G/C; Defensive linemen: 74 Dave Chaytors NT; 92 Doug Petersen DE; 72 Glen Scrivener DE; 73 Andrew Stewart DE; Special teams: 5 Lui Passaglia K/P	Linebackers: 11 Daved Benefield; 37 Keith Castello; 47 Tyrone Chatman; 39 Matt Clarke; 48 Brian Forde; 94 Henry Newby; 31 Shelton Quarles; 27 Donovan Wright; Defensive backs: 23 Tony Collier; 7 Rob Davis; 13 Tom Europe; 26 Charles Gordon; 29 Enis Jackson; 20 James Jefferson; 3 Kelly Sims; 17 Eddie Lee Thomas	Injured list: 34 Ryan Hanson FB; 25 Sean Millington FB; 78 Rob Prodanovic DE; 79 Stefan Ptaszek WR; 95 Michel Raby NT; 96 Virgil Robertson LB; 63 Vic Stevenson T; 77 Mike Trevathan SB; Italics indicate International player

== Awards and records ==
=== 1995 CFL All-Stars ===
- OG – Jamie Taras, CFL All-Star

=== Northern All-Star selections ===
- RB – Cory Philpot, CFL Northern All-Star
- OG – Jamie Taras, CFL Northern All-Star
- OT – Vic Stevenson, CFL Northern All-Star
- DE – Andrew Stewart, CFL Northern All-Star
- DS – Tom Europe, CFL Northern All-Star

== Playoffs ==
=== North semi-final ===
Team	Q1	Q2	Q3	Q4	Total
Edmonton Eskimos	7	9	6	4	26
BC Lions	0	6	0	9	15
