= 1995 San Antonio Texans season =

- Owner: Fred Anderson
- Head coach: Kay Stephenson
- Home stadium: Alamodome

Results
- Record: 12–6
- Division place: 2nd, South
- Playoffs: Lost in South Final

Uniform
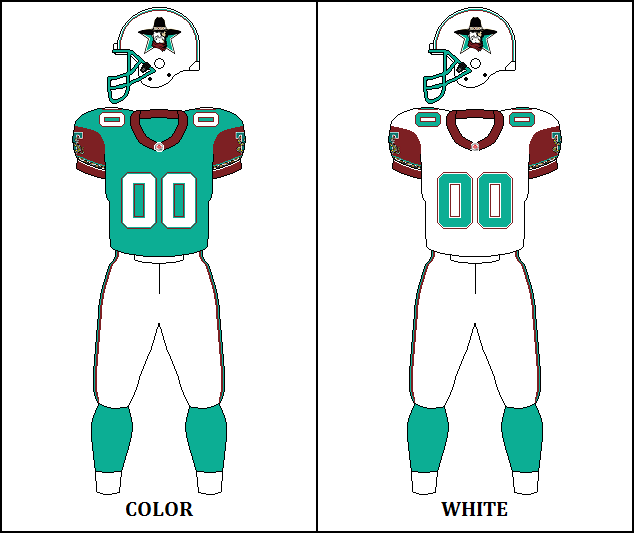

The 1995 San Antonio Texans season was the third season for the franchise in Canadian Football League and their first in San Antonio, Texas after their relocation from Sacramento, California. They earned a 12–6 record and finished second in the South Division, allowing the team to advance to playoffs where they lost the South Final to the Baltimore Stallions. The Texans would cease operations following the end of their season.

== Pre-season ==
Game	Date	Opponent	Results		Venue	Attendance
Game	Date	Opponent	Score	Record	Venue	Attendance
A	Sat, June 17	at Memphis Mad Dogs	W 35–14	1–0	Liberty Bowl Memorial Stadium	13,454
B	Sat, June 24	vs. Shreveport Pirates	W 34–14	2–0	Alamodome	16,820

== Regular season ==
=== Season standings ===
South Division
Pos	Team	Pld	W	L	T	PF	PA	PD	Pts	Div	Stk
1	Baltimore Stallions (Q)	18	15	3	0	541	369	172	30	6–1	W10
2	San Antonio Texans (Q)	18	12	6	0	630	457	173	24	5–3	W3
3	Birmingham Barracudas (Q)	18	10	8	0	548	518	30	20	3–4	L2
4	Memphis Mad Dogs	18	9	9	0	346	364	−18	18	4–3	L1
5	Shreveport Pirates	18	5	13	0	465	514	−49	10	0–8	L2

Source: "CFL.ca". Archived from the original on July 15, 2009.
(Q) Qualified for playoffs

=== Schedule ===
Week	Game	Date	Opponent	Results		Venue	Attendance
Week	Game	Date	Opponent	Score	Record	Venue	Attendance
1	1	Sat, July 1	at Shreveport Pirates	W 47–24	1–0	Independence Stadium	15,133
2	2	Sat, July 8	at Baltimore Stallions	L 24–50	1–1	Memorial Stadium	31,016
3	3	Sat, July 15	vs. Baltimore Stallions	L 23–28	1–2	Alamodome	18,112
4	4	Sat, July 22	vs. Edmonton Eskimos	W 32–27	2–2	Alamodome	12,856
5	5	Wed, July 26	at Winnipeg Blue Bombers	L 17–20	2–3	Winnipeg Stadium	20,961
5	6	Sun, July 30	at Saskatchewan Roughriders	W 36–15	3–3	Taylor Field	22,215
6	7	Sat, Aug 5	vs. Memphis Mad Dogs	W 24–9	4–3	Alamodome	15,557
7	8	Sat, Aug 12	vs. Calgary Stampeders	L 32–38	4–4	Alamodome	22,043
8	9	Sat, Aug 19	at Hamilton Tiger-Cats	L 31–35	4–5	Ivor Wynne Stadium	20,520
9	10	Sat, Aug 26	at Memphis Mad Dogs	W 26–6	5–5	Liberty Bowl Memorial Stadium	16,223
10	11	Mon, Sept 4	vs. Toronto Argonauts	W 47–28	6–5	Alamodome	16,028
11	Bye						
12	12	Sat, Sept 16	at Toronto Argonauts	W 42–21	7–5	Skydome	14,593
13	13	Sat, Sept 23	vs. Hamilton Tiger-Cats	W 45–7	8–5	Alamodome	14,614
14	14	Sat, Sept 30	at Ottawa Rough Riders	W 49–14	9–5	Frank Clair Stadium	19,957
15	15	Sun, Oct 8	at Birmingham Barracudas	L 28–38	9–6	Legion Field	6,859
16	16	Thu, Oct 12	vs. Ottawa Rough Riders	W 43–30	10–6	Alamodome	10,027
17	17	Thu, Oct 19	vs. Shreveport Pirates	W 35–26	11–6	Alamodome	14,437
18	18	Sun, Oct 29	vs. Birmingham Barracudas	W 48–42	12–6	Alamodome	19,025

== Playoffs ==
Game	Date	Opponent	Results		Venue	Attendance
Game	Date	Opponent	Score	Record	Venue	Attendance
South semi-final	Sun, Nov 5	vs. Birmingham Barracudas	W 51–9	1–0	Alamodome	13,031
South conference final	Sun, Nov 12	at Baltimore Stallions	L 11–21	1–1	Memorial Stadium	30,217

== Roster ==
1995 San Antonio Texans final roster
Quarterbacks: 18 David Archer; 15 Jimmy Kemp; Running backs: 29 Phil Brown; 28 Tony Burse; 27 Eddie Fuller; 20 Troy Mills; 32 Mike Saunders; 23 Heath Sherman; Receivers: 87 Brett Bech; 6 David Gamble; 80 Billy Hess; 3 Joe Kralik; 21 Jimmy Lee; 83 David Lucas; 12 Mark Stock; 85 Kitrick Taylor	Offensive linemen: 62 John Buddenberg T; 69 Chuck Esty G; 54 Joe Garten G; 63 Mike Kiselak C; 59 Darrin Muilenburg G; 51 Daryle Smith T; 60 Robert Stevenson T/LS; Defensive linemen: 93 George Bethune DT; 31 Andy Cobaugh DE; 56 Roosevelt Collins DE; 78 Willie Fears DT; 96 Oscar Giles DT; 53 James King DE; 99 Lance Teichelman DT; Special teams: 14 Roman Anderson K; 8 Todd Jordan P	Linebackers: 44 Hurlie Brown; 58 Dave Harper; 97 Maurice Miller; 90 Leonard Nelson; 55 Tommie Smith; 57 Tim Walton; Defensive backs: 24 Grady Cavness; 10 Malcolm Frank; 17 Charles Franks; 26 Marcus Gates; 45 Tommy Gerhart; 2 Johnnie Harris; 22 Michael Hendricks; 39 Bobby Humphery; 7 Jason Wallace; 25 Kenny Wilhite; Italics indicate American player
