= 1995 Shreveport Pirates season =

- Owner: Bernard Glieberman and Lonnie Glieberman
- Head coach: Forrest Gregg
- Home stadium: Independence Stadium

Results
- Record: 5–13
- Division place: 5th, South
- Playoffs: Did not qualify

Uniform
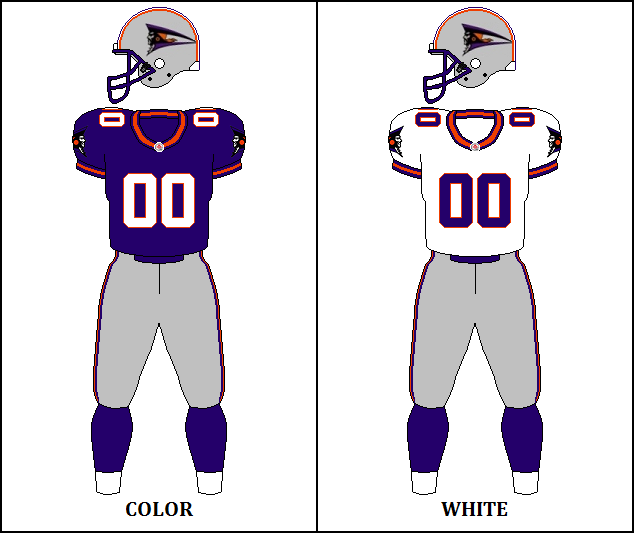

The 1995 Shreveport Pirates season was the second season in the teams franchise history and would also prove to be the last. They finished last place in the South Division with a 5–13 record and again failed to make the playoffs.

== Preseason ==
Game	Date	Opponent	Results		Venue	Attendance
Game	Date	Opponent	Score	Record	Venue	Attendance
A	Fri, June 16	Birmingham Barracudas	W 31–28	1–0	Independence Stadium	18,883
B	Sat, June 24	at San Antonio Texans	L 17–34	1–1	Alamodome	16,820

== Regular season ==
=== Season standings ===
South Division
Pos	Team	Pld	W	L	T	PF	PA	PD	Pts	Div	Stk
1	Baltimore Stallions (Q)	18	15	3	0	541	369	172	30	6–1	W10
2	San Antonio Texans (Q)	18	12	6	0	630	457	173	24	5–3	W3
3	Birmingham Barracudas (Q)	18	10	8	0	548	518	30	20	3–4	L2
4	Memphis Mad Dogs	18	9	9	0	346	364	−18	18	4–3	L1
5	Shreveport Pirates	18	5	13	0	465	514	−49	10	0–8	L2

Source: "CFL.ca". Archived from the original on July 15, 2009.
(Q) Qualified for playoffs

=== Season schedule ===
Week	Game	Date	Opponent	Results		Venue	Attendance
Week	Game	Date	Opponent	Score	Record	Venue	Attendance
1	1	Sat, July 1	San Antonio Texans	L 24–47	0–1	Independence Stadium	15,133
2	2	Sat, July 8	Calgary Stampeders	L 17–48	0–2	Independence Stadium	14,026
3	3	Thurs, July 13	at Winnipeg Blue Bombers	L 29–37	0–3	Winnipeg Stadium	20,449
3	4	Mon, July 17	at Edmonton Eskimos	L 7–37	0–4	Commonwealth Stadium	29,463
4	5	Sat, July 22	Toronto Argonauts	W 11–10	1–4	Independence Stadium	13,184
5	6	Fri, July 28	at Calgary Stampeders	L 19–27	1–5	McMahon Stadium	21,098
6	7	Sat, Aug 5	Winnipeg Blue Bombers	W 65–17	2–5	Independence Stadium	11,554
7	8	Fri, Aug 11	at Hamilton Tiger-Cats	L 20–30	2–6	Ivor Wynne Stadium	20,182
8	9	Fri, Aug 18	Ottawa Rough Riders	W 61–11	3–6	Independence Stadium	11,554
9	10	Sat, Aug 26	at BC Lions	W 20–19	4–6	BC Place	24,535
10	11	Sun, Sept 3	Memphis Mad Dogs	L 22–31	4–7	Independence Stadium	17,593
11	12	Sun, Sept 10	at Memphis Mad Dogs	L 21–22	4–8	Liberty Bowl Memorial Stadium	10,198
12	13	Fri, Sept 15	Baltimore Stallions	L 17–24	4–9	Independence Stadium	12,455
13	14	Sat, Sept 23	at Baltimore Stallions	L 32–42	4–10	Memorial Stadium	27,321
14	15	Sun, Oct 1	at Birmingham Barracudas	L 20–34	4–11	Legion Field	6,314
15	16	Sat, Oct 7	Hamilton Tiger-Cats	W 26–14	5–11	Independence Stadium	12,619
16	17	Fri, Oct 13	Birmingham Barracudas	L 28–29	5–12	Independence Stadium	21,117
17	18	Thurs, Oct 19	at San Antonio Texans	L 26–35	5–13	Alamodome	14,437
18	Bye						

== Roster ==
1995 Shreveport Pirates final roster
Quarterbacks: 12 Robert Cobb; 10 Mike Johnson; 15 Mike Pawlawski; 11 Billy Joe Tolliver; Running backs: 2 Norman Bradford; 24 Travis Cozart; 5 Martin Patton; 1 Junior Smith; Receivers: 7 Freeman Baysinger; 83 Will Covington; 81 Rod Harris; 89 Curtis Mayfield; 4 Fred Montgomery; 88 Terry Smith; 80 Wayne Walker	Offensive linemen: 66 Terry Beauford G; 63 Chris Dausin C; 65 Jon Heidenreich T; 69 Ben Jefferson T; 68 Donnell Johnson T; 60 Uzooma Okeke G; 58 Chuck Reed G; 62 Mike Stowell C; Defensive linemen: 99 Alex Mash DE; 45 Joe Montford DE; 77 Reggie Rogers DT; 96 Ray Savage DE; 72 Johnny Scott DT; 64 Ben Willaims DT	Linebackers: 42 Reggie Anderson; 46 Eldonta Osborne; 36 Mario Perry; 42 Chris Zingo; Defensive backs: 29 Reggie Carthon; 33 Bobby Evans; 31 Brandon Hamilton; 19 Carlton Johnson; 30 Quenton King; 0 Harold Nash; 26 Kim Phillips; 23 Anthony Shelton; 22 Will White; Special teams: 6 Robbie Keen P; 16 Björn Nittmo K; Italics indicate American player
