= 1995 Calgary Stampeders season =

Canadian football team season

- Owner: Larry Ryckman
- General manager: Wally Buono
- Head coach: Wally Buono
- Home stadium: McMahon Stadium

Results
- Record: 15–3
- Division place: 1st, North
- Playoffs: Lost Grey Cup

Uniform

The 1995 Calgary Stampeders finished in first place in the North Division with a 15–3 record. They appeared in the 83rd Grey Cup but lost to the Baltimore Stallions. That Grey Cup game marked the only time an American-based team won the Grey Cup.

On September 20, 1992, Calgary began the CFL's longest ever regular season home winning and unbeaten streaks. These streaks ended on August 18, 1995, at 27.

== Offseason ==
=== CFL draft ===
Round	Pick	Player	Position	School
B	7	Kevin Reid	WR	Guelph
1	15	Steve Mattison	FB	Illinois
3	30	Ryan Hudecki	RB	McMaster
4	35	Sheldon Warawa	T	Minot State
5	46	Mark Clarke	WR	Simon Fraser
6	54	Michael Hendricks	DT	St. Francis Xavier

== Preseason ==
Game	Date	Opponent	Results		Venue	Attendance
Game	Date	Opponent	Score	Record	Venue	Attendance
A	Sat, June 17	at BC Lions	L 18–36	0–1	BC Place	29,301
B	Thu, June 22	vs. Edmonton Eskimos	W 42–31	1–1	McMahon Stadium	

== Regular season ==
=== Season standings ===
North Division
Pos	Team	Pld	W	L	T	PF	PA	PD	Pts	Div	Stk
1	Calgary Stampeders (Q)	18	15	3	0	631	404	227	30	9–2	L1
2	Edmonton Eskimos (Q)	18	13	5	0	599	359	240	26	9–3	W6
3	BC Lions (Q)	18	10	8	0	535	470	65	20	7–6	W1
4	Hamilton Tiger-Cats (Q)	18	8	10	0	427	509	−82	16	5–4	L2
5	Winnipeg Blue Bombers (Q)	18	7	11	0	404	653	−249	14	5–7	W2
6	Saskatchewan Roughriders	18	6	12	0	422	451	−29	12	5–7	L2
7	Toronto Argonauts	18	4	14	0	376	519	−143	8	3–9	W1
8	Ottawa Rough Riders	18	3	15	0	348	685	−337	6	3–8	L1

Source: "CFL.ca". Archived from the original on 2009-07-15.
(Q) Qualified for playoffs

=== Season schedule ===
Week	Game	Date	Opponent	Results		Venue	Attendance
Week	Game	Date	Opponent	Score	Record	Venue	Attendance
1	1	Thur, June 29	vs. Memphis Mad Dogs	W 24–18	1–0	McMahon Stadium	25,071
2	2	Sat, July 8	at Shreveport Pirates	W 48–17	2–0	Independence Stadium	14,026
3	3	Thur, July 13	at Ottawa Rough Riders	W 57–7	3–0	Frank Clair Stadium	24,861
4	4	Fri, July 21	vs. BC Lions	W 46–24	4–0	McMahon Stadium	30,012
5	5	Fri, July 28	vs. Shreveport Pirates	W 27–19	5–0	McMahon Stadium	21,098
6	6	Sun, Aug 6	vs. Baltimore Stallions	W 29–15	6–0	McMahon Stadium	24,463
7	7	Sat, Aug 12	at San Antonio Texans	W 38–32	7–0	Alamodome	22,043
8	8	Fri, Aug 18	vs. Birmingham Barracudas	L 28–31	7–1	McMahon Stadium	25,129
9	9	Sat, Aug 26	at Birmingham Barracudas	W 37–14	8–1	Legion Field	19,652
10	10	Mon, Sept 4	vs. Edmonton Eskimos	W 51–26	9–1	McMahon Stadium	37,317
11	11	Fri, Sept 8	at Edmonton Eskimos	W 33–17	10–1	Commonwealth Stadium	49,434
12	Bye						
13	12	Tue, Sept 19	vs. Winnipeg Blue Bombers	W 43–28	11–1	McMahon Stadium	21,738
13	13	Sun, Sept 24	at Winnipeg Blue Bombers	W 43–39	12–1	Winnipeg Stadium	24,598
14	14	Sat, Sept 30	vs. Toronto Argonauts	W 26–19	13–1	McMahon Stadium	22,570
15	15	Mon, Oct 9	at BC Lions	W 41–27	14–1	BC Place	32,907
16	16	Sat, Oct 14	at Saskatchewan Roughriders	L 20–25	14–2	Taylor Field	55,438
17	17	Sun, Oct 22	vs. Saskatchewan Roughriders	W 18–15	15–2	McMahon Stadium	33,258
18	18	Fri, Oct 27	at Toronto Argonauts	L 22–31	15–3	SkyDome	23,196

== Awards and records ==
- Jeff Nicklin Memorial Trophy – Dave Sapunjis (SB)

== Playoffs ==
=== North Semi-Final ===
Due to the unbalanced divisional alignment used this season as well as the league's preference to maintain regional rivalries, some North Division teams did not play one another in the regular season, including Calgary and Hamilton. Their 1995 North Division Semi-Final remains the only non-Grey Cup postseason game in the history of professional Canadian football to be played between teams that did not face one another in the regular season.

Team	Q1	Q2	Q3	Q4	Total
Hamilton Tiger-Cats	0	10	0	3	13
Calgary Stampeders	3	3	0	24	30

=== North Final ===
Team	Q1	Q2	Q3	Q4	Total
Edmonton Eskimos	0	4	0	0	4
Calgary Stampeders	10	20	3	4	37

=== Grey Cup ===
Team	Q1	Q2	Q3	Q4	Total
Calgary Stampeders	6	7	7	0	20
Baltimore Stallions	7	16	8	6	37

== Roster ==
1995 Calgary Stampeders final roster
Quarterbacks: 20 Doug Flutie; 7 Jeff Garcia; 12 Shawn Moore; Running backs: 29 Craig Brenner; 35 Shawn Daniels; 21 Tony Stewart; Receivers: 88 Vince Danielsen; 18 Allen Pitts; 87 Kevin Reid; 25 Dave Sapunjis; 2 Terry Vaughn	Offensive linemen: 64 Bruce Beaton T; 53 Denny Chronopoulos G; 67 Jamie Crysdale C; 50 Jay McNeil G; 69 Bobby Pandelidis G; 59 Rocco Romano T; Defensive linemen: 84 Gonzalo Floyd DE; 81 Will Johnson DE; 75 Stu Laird DT; 92 DeWayne Patterson DT; 96 Srecko Zizakovic DT	Linebackers: 44 Ray Biggs; 37 Matt Finlay; 51 Alondra Johnson; 41 Anthony McClanahan; 91 Marvin Pope; Defensive backs: 17 Marvin Coleman; 6 Greg Frers; 27 Al Jordan; 3 Jackie Kellogg; 8 Greg Knox; 30 Kenton Leonard; 14 Dondre Owens; 38 Gerald Vaughn	Special teams: 11 Tony Martino P; 13 Mark McLoughlin K; Reserve roster: 95 Mark Pearce DE; Injured list: 60 Bruce Covernton T; 23 Tyrone Edwards RB; 86 Demetrius Smith WR; Italics indicate International player
