= Erik White (Canadian football) =

American gridiron football player (born 1970)

No. 11, 12
- Position: Quarterback

Personal information
- Born: September 12, 1970 (age 56); Canton, Ohio, U.S.
- Listed height: 6 ft 5 in (1.96 m)
- Listed weight: 220 lb (100 kg)

Career information
- High school: Washington (Massillon, Ohio)
- College: Bowling Green (1988–1992)
- NFL draft: 1993: undrafted

Career history
- 1993: Indianapolis Colts*
- 1994–1995: Toronto Argonauts
- 1995: BC Lions
- 1996: Amsterdam Admirals
- 1996: Saskatchewan Roughriders*
- * Offseason or practice squad member only

Awards and highlights
- 2× MAC Most Valuable Player (1991, 1992); 2× MAC Offensive Player of the Year (1991, 1992)

Erik Lynn White (born September 12, 1970) is an American former professional football player who was a quarterback for two seasons in the Canadian Football League (CFL) with the Toronto Argonauts and BC Lions. He played college football for the Bowling Green Falcons, earning MAC Most Valuable Player honors twice.

== Early life ==
Erik Lynn White was born on September 12, 1970, in Canton, Ohio. He played high school football at Massillon Washington High School in Massillon, Ohio and became the starting quarterback in 1987.

== College career ==
White was a member of the Bowling Green Falcons of Bowling Green State University from 1988 to 1992 and a four-year letterman from 1989 to 1992. He completed eight of 21 passes (38.1%) for 102 yards and two interceptions his redshirt freshman year in 1989. He recorded 127 completions on 262 passing attempts (48.5%) for 1,386 yards, five touchdowns and 12 interceptions in 1990 while also scoring one rushing touchdown. White completed 185 of 323 passes (57.3%) for 2,204 yards, 17 touchdowns, and ten interceptions during the 1991 season while also rushing one touchdown and catching two passes for two yards and a touchdown. His completions, passing yards, and passing touchdowns all led the Mid-American Conference (MAC) that season. White won the Vern Smith Leadership Award, give to the MAC's Most Valuable Player, and was also named the MAC Offensive Player of the Year. As a senior in 1992, White totaled 195 completions on 344 attempts (56.7%) for 2,380 yards, 17 touchdowns, and 17 interceptions. His completions and interceptions were both the most in the MAC that year. He was named the MAC's Most Valuable Player, and Offensive Player of the Year for the second consecutive season. White had a 24–7–2 record as a starter in college. He graduated from Bowling Green with a degree in communication.

=== Statistics ===
Season	Team	Games			Passing								Rushing			
Season	Team	GP	GS	Record	Cmp	Att	Pct	Yds	Y/A	TD	Int	Rtg	Att	Yds	Avg	TD
1989	Bowling Green	2	0	—	8	21	38.1	102	4.9	0	2	59.8	0	0	0.0	0
1990	Bowling Green	9	9	3–4–2	127	262	48.5	1,386	5.3	5	12	90.0	19	–28	–1.5	1
1991	Bowling Green	11	11	10–1	185	323	57.3	2,204	6.8	17	10	125.8	57	83	1.5	1
1992	Bowling Green	11	11	9–2	195	344	56.7	2,380	6.9	17	17	121.2	67	87	1.3	2
Regular season		33	31	22–7–2	515	950	54.2	6,072	6.4	39	41	112.8	143	142	1.0	4
Bowl games		2	2	2–0	42	70	60.0	508	7.3	4	2	134.1	12	11	0.9	0
Career		35	33	24–7–2	557	1,020	54.6	6,580	6.5	43	43	114.3	155	153	1.0	4

Bowl games only began counting toward single-season and career statistics in 2002.

- 1991 California Bowl – 18/30, 263 yards, 2 TD, 2 Int. Seven rushes for one yard.
- 1992 Las Vegas Bowl – 24/40, 245 yards, 2 TD. Five rushes for 10 yards. One reception, eight yards, TD.

== Professional career ==
White signed with the Indianapolis Colts in April 1993 after going undrafted in the 1993 NFL draft. He was waived on August 23, 1993.

White was signed by the Toronto Argonauts of the Canadian Football League (CFL) on May 27, 1994. He dressed in 11 games, starting one, for the Argonauts during the 1994 season, completing 31 of 67 passes (46.3%) for 354 yards and five interceptions. He also spent time on the injured list that year. After Kent Austin suffered an injury, White began the 1995 season as the team's starting quarterback. He threw for two touchdowns in a 37–24 season opening win against the Ottawa Rough Riders. Overall, he dressed in eight games with two starts in 1995, recording 43 completions on 82 attempts (52.4%) for 569 yards, two touchdowns, and six interceptions. On August 25, 1995, it was reported that White had been released by the Argonauts.

White signed with the CFL's BC Lions in mid September 1995. He dressed in four games for the Lions in 1995, completing two of five passes for 18 yards.

White was a member of the Amsterdam Admirals of the World League of American Football (WLAF) during the 1996 WLAF season.

White was signed to the practice roster of the Saskatchewan Roughriders of the CFL in August 1996 after Heath Rylance suffered an injury. After only three days on the practice roster, White was released due to a tendon problem in his right elbow.

== Career statistics ==
CFL

Year	Team	Games			Passing								Rushing			
Year	Team	GD	GS	Record	Cmp	Att	Pct	Yds	Y/A	TD	Int	Rtg	Att	Yds	Avg	TD
1994	TOR	11	1	1–0	31	67	46.3	354	5.3	0	5	31.6	4	32	8.0	0
1995	TOR	8	2	1–1	43	82	52.4	569	6.9	2	6	52.3	4	26	6.5	0
1995	BC	4	0	—	2	5	40.0	18	3.6	0	0	50.4	0	0	0.0	0
Career		23	3	2–1	76	154	49.4	941	6.1	2	11	43.2	8	58	7.2	0

== Personal life ==
White later spent time as a color commentator for Bowling Green Falcons football games.
