= List of Bowling Green Falcons starting quarterbacks =

This is a list of the starting quarterbacks for the Bowling Green Falcons football teams since 1982. A player is credited with a win if he started the game and the team won that game, no matter if the player was injured or permanently removed after the first play.

== Starters per season ==
The number of games they started during the season is listed to the right of their name:

Season	Starting quarterback(s)	References
1982	Brian McClure (8) / Dayne Palsgrove (4)	
1983	Brian McClure (11)	
1984	Brian McClure (11)	
1985	Brian McClure (12)	
1986	Rich Dackin (7) / Eric Smith (4)	
1987	Rich Dackin (10) / Eric Smith (1)	
1988	Rich Dackin (5) / Eric Smith (5) / Steve Spray (1)	
1989	Rich Dackin (11)	
1990	Erik White (9) / Pat Gucciardo (1)	
1991	Erik White (12)	
1992	Erik White (12)	
1993	Ryan Henry (11)	
1994	Ryan Henry (11)	
1995	Ryan Henry (7) / Bob Niemet (4)	
1996	Bob Niemet (9) / Mark Molk (2)	
1997	Bob Niemet (9) / Ricky Schneider (2)	
1998	Bob Niemet (7) / Ricky Schneider (4)	
1999	Andy Sahm (7) / Ricky Schneider (4)	
2000	Andy Sahm (10) / Josh Harris (1)	
2001	Andy Sahm (7) / Josh Harris (4)	
2002	Josh Harris (12)	
2003	Josh Harris (14)	
2004	Omar Jacobs (12)	
2005	Omar Jacobs (9) / Anthony Turner (2)	
2006	Anthony Turner (10) / Freddie Barnes (2)	
2007	Tyler Sheehan (13)	
2008	Tyler Sheehan (12)	
2009	Tyler Sheehan (13)	
2010	Matt Schilz (10) / Aaron Pankratz (2)	
2011	Matt Schilz (12)	
2012	Matt Schilz (13)	
2013	Matt Johnson (13) / Matt Schilz (1)	
2014	James Knapke (13) / Matt Johnson (1)	
2015	Matt Johnson (14)	
2016	James Morgan (7) / James Knapke (5)	
2017	James Morgan (6) / Jarret Doege (6)	
2018	Jarret Doege (12)	
2019	Grant Loy (7) / Darius Wade (5)	
2020	Matt McDonald (5)	
2021	Matt McDonald (12)	
2022	Matt McDonald (12) / Camden Orth (1)	
2023	Connor Bazelak (11) / Camden Orth (2)	
2024	Connor Bazelak (13)	
2025	Drew Pyne (6) / Hunter Najm (3) / Lucian Anderson III (2) / Baron May (1)	

== Most games as starting quarterback ==
These quarterbacks have the most starts for the Falcons since the 1982 season. If tied, quarterback will be sorted by win percentage and then most recently played. (Through the 1982—2024 NCAA Seasons)

Name	
GP	Games played
GS	Games started
W	Number of wins as starting quarterback
L	Number of losses as starting quarterback
T	Number of ties as starting quarterback
%	Winning percentage as starting quarterback

Name	Period	GP	GS	W	L	T	%
Brian McClure	1982–1985	44	42	32	10	—	.762
Tyler Sheehan	2006–2009	42	38	21	17	—	.553
Matt Schilz	2010–2013	43	36	16	20	—	.444
Erik White	1989–1992	35	33	24	7	2	.758
Rich Dackin	1986–1989	33*	33	14	19	—	.424
Josh Harris	2000–2003	42	31	24	7	—	.774
Ryan Henry	1992–1995	32	29	17	10	2	.621
Bob Niemet	1995–1998	39	29	14	15	—	.483
Matt McDonald	2020–2022	29	29	10	19	—	.345
Matt Johnson	2012–2015	37	28	19	9	—	.679
Connor Bazelak	2023–2024	24	24	13	11	—	.542
Andy Sahm	1998–2002	39	24	10	14	—	.417
Omar Jacobs	2002–2005	25	21	14	7	—	.667
James Knapke	2012–2016	40	18	10	8	—	.556
Jarret Doege	2017–2018	19	18	4	14	—	.222
James Morgan	2015–2017	19	13	3	10	—	.231
Anthony Turner (Note: Only includes QB GS. Does not include RB and WR GS.)	2004–2008	32	12	5	7	—	.417
Eric Smith	1986–1988	10*	10	3	6	1	.350
Ricky Schneider	1997–2000	25	10	2	8	—	.200
Grant Loy	2016–2019	29	7	2	5	—	.286
Darius Wade	2019	7	5	1	4	—	.200
Camden Orth	2022–2024	22	3	1	2	—	.333
Aaron Pankratz	2008–2010	7	2	0	2	—	.000
Freddie Barnes (Note: Only includes QB GS. Does not include WR GS.)	2005–2009	47	2	0	2	—	.000
Mark Molk	1996	11	2	0	2	—	.000
Pat Gucciardo	1988–1991	4*	1	0	1	—	.000
Steve Spray	1988–1989	2*	1	0	1	—	.000

- * – Indicates total of games played is unknown.
- **Bold** – Indicates player is active

== Team career passing records ==
Top 5 Passing yardage leaders since 1956

Name	Comp	Att	Pct	Yds	TD	Int
Brian McClure	900	1,427	63.1	10,280	63	58
Tyler Sheehan	966	1,494	64.7	10,117	70	31
Matt Johnson	655	1,002	65.4	8,845	73	16
Matt Schilz	715	1,225	58.4	8,012	51	39
Josh Harris	627	1,028	61.0	7,503	55	28

(Through the 2024 NCAA Season)
