= 1995 Winnipeg Blue Bombers season =

Canadian football team season

- General manager: Cal Murphy
- Head coach: Cal Murphy
- Home stadium: Winnipeg Stadium

Results
- Record: 7–11
- Division place: 5th, North
- Playoffs: Lost South Semi-Final

Uniform

The 1995 Winnipeg Blue Bombers finished in fifth place in the North Division with a 7–11 record. They faced the Baltimore Stallions in a South Division Semi-Final match, becoming the first CFL team to use the crossover rule.

== Offseason ==
=== CFL draft ===
Round	Pick	Player	Position	University team
Bonus	6	Seab Graham	SB	British Columbia
1	14	Jason Mallett	DB	Carleton
2	22	Ante Skorput	G	Michigan
3	29	Peter Pejovic	T	Simon Fraser
4	37	Wade Miller	LB	Manitoba
5	45	Todd Graham	NG	Glenville State
6	53	Adrian Rainbow	LB	Utah

== Preseason ==
Game	Date	Opponent	Results		Venue	Attendance
Game	Date	Opponent	Score	Record	Venue	Attendance
A	Fri, June 16	at Saskatchewan Roughriders	W 30–27	1–0	Taylor Field	27,203
B	Thu, June 22	vs. Hamilton Tiger-Cats	W 30–23	2–0	Winnipeg Stadium	26,000

== Regular season ==
=== Season standings ===
North Division
Pos	Team	Pld	W	L	T	PF	PA	PD	Pts	Div	Stk
1	Calgary Stampeders (Q)	18	15	3	0	631	404	227	30	9–2	L1
2	Edmonton Eskimos (Q)	18	13	5	0	599	359	240	26	9–3	W6
3	BC Lions (Q)	18	10	8	0	535	470	65	20	7–6	W1
4	Hamilton Tiger-Cats (Q)	18	8	10	0	427	509	−82	16	5–4	L2
5	Winnipeg Blue Bombers (Q)	18	7	11	0	404	653	−249	14	5–7	W2
6	Saskatchewan Roughriders	18	6	12	0	422	451	−29	12	5–7	L2
7	Toronto Argonauts	18	4	14	0	376	519	−143	8	3–9	W1
8	Ottawa Rough Riders	18	3	15	0	348	685	−337	6	3–8	L1

Source: "CFL.ca". Archived from the original on 2009-07-15.
(Q) Qualified for playoffs

=== Season schedule ===
Week	Game	Date	Opponent	Results		Venue	Attendance
Week	Game	Date	Opponent	Score	Record	Venue	Attendance
1	1	Wed, June 28	at Ottawa Rough Riders	L 15–25	0–1	Frank Clair Stadium	23,241
2	2	Tue, July 4	vs. Birmingham Barracudas	L 10–38	0–2	Winnipeg Stadium	22,208
3	3	Thu, July 13	vs. Shreveport Pirates	W 37–29	1–2	Winnipeg Stadium	20,449
4	4	Sat, July 22	at Baltimore Stallions	L 7–43	1–3	Memorial Stadium	30,641
5	5	Wed, July 26	vs. San Antonio Texans	W 20–17	2–3	Winnipeg Stadium	20,961
6	6	Sat, Aug 5	at Shreveport Pirates	L 17–65	2–4	Independence Stadium	11,554
7	7	Sat, Aug 12	at Birmingham Barracudas	L 24–50	2–5	Legion Field	17,328
8	8	Fri, Aug 18	vs. BC Lions	W 11–6	3–5	Winnipeg Stadium	22,769
9	9	Fri, Aug 25	vs. Hamilton Tiger-Cats	L 33–36	3–6	Winnipeg Stadium	22,211
10	10	Sun, Sept 3	at Saskatchewan Roughriders	L 4–56	3–7	Taylor Field	31,308
11	11	Sun, Sept 10	vs. Saskatchewan Roughriders	W 25–24	4–7	Winnipeg Stadium	24,698
12	12	Fri, Sept 15	at Edmonton Eskimos	L 10–64	4–8	Commonwealth Stadium	27,718
13	13	Tue, Sept 19	at Calgary Stampeders	L 28–43	4–9	McMahon Stadium	21,738
13	14	Sun, Sept 24	vs. Calgary Stampeders	L 39–43	4–10	Winnipeg Stadium	24,598
14	15	Fri, Sept 29	at Hamilton Tiger-Cats	W 24–20	5–10	Ivor Wynne Stadium	20,727
15	16	Mon, Oct 9	at Toronto Argonauts	L 20–31	5–11	SkyDome	14,507
16	17	Sat, Oct 14	vs. Toronto Argonauts	W 44–30	6–11	Winnipeg Stadium	21,076
17	Bye						
18	18	Sun, Oct 29	vs. Ottawa Rough Riders	W 36–33	7–11	Winnipeg Stadium	27,022

== Playoffs ==
=== South Semi-Final ===
Team	Q1	Q2	Q3	Q4	Total
Winnipeg Blue Bombers	1	0	6	14	21
Baltimore Stallions	10	8	7	11	36

== Roster ==
1995 Winnipeg Blue Bombers final roster
Quarterbacks: 15 Kevin McDougal; 10 Reggie Slack; Running backs: 31 Wilbert Biggens; 21 Blaise Bryant; 25 Chris Johnstone; 19 Mike Oliphant; 32 Matt Pearce; 39 Alan Wetmore; Receivers: 17 Allan Boyko; 81 Tim Daniel; 88 Sean Graham; 85 Milt Stegall; 87 Gerald Wilcox	Offensive linemen: 64 Miles Gorrell T; 57 Brett MacNeil G; 43 Kevin Robson C; 65 Jim Smyrl G; 60 Dave Vankoughnett C; 63 Chris Walby T; Defensive linemen: 77 Stan Mikawos DT; 90 Keilly Rush DE; 72 Colin Scrivener DT; 99 Kenny Walker DE; Special teams: 6 Bob Cameron P; 74 Troy Westwood K	Linebackers: 38 Doug Hocking; 56 Del Lyles; 42 John Motton; 35 Brendan Rogers; 37 Kelvin Smith; 44 K. D. Williams; Defensive backs: 7 Ryan Carey; 27 Corris Ervin; 23 Shannon Garrett; 20 Jason Mallett; 2 David Pool; 26 Darrius Watson	Injured list: 55 Andre Allen DE; 83 Shannon Baker WR; 5 Juran Bolden DB; 64 Tracy Boyd G; 22 Ken Burress DB; 58 Greg Clark LB; 94 Tony Hill DE; 36 Paul Randolph LB; 30 Darryl Sampson DB; Suspended: Tony Robinson DE; Ed Tillison RB; Italics indicate International player
