= 1995 Ottawa Rough Riders season =

Canadian football team season

- Head coach: Jim Gilstrap
- Home stadium: Frank Clair Stadium

Results
- Record: 3–15
- Division place: 8th, North
- Playoffs: did not qualify

Uniform

The 1995 Ottawa Rough Riders finished eighth place in the North Division with a 3–15 record and failed to make the playoffs.

== Offseason ==
=== CFL draft ===
Round	Pick	Player	Position	School
1	2	Stefan Reid	LB	Boise State
2	18	Stewart Masi	G	Western Michigan
3	25	Keith Hiscock	G	Simon Fraser
3	27	Heron Tait	DB	Guelph
3	31	Steve Sarty	WR	St. Mary's
4	33	Glen Fowles	OT	Willamette
4	34	Pierre-Paul Dorenlien	OT	Ottawa
4	39	Sean Marriott	LB	St. Mary's
5	41	Massaki Konno	SB	Bishop's
5	43	Danny Lavallee	DL	Concordia
6	49	Michael Simoncic	OL	Concordia

=== Preseason ===
Game	Date	Opponent	Results		Venue	Attendance
Game	Date	Opponent	Score	Record	Venue	Attendance
A	Sat, June 17	at Baltimore Stallions	L 11–45	0–1	Memorial Stadium	20,642
B	Thu, June 22	vs. Memphis Mad Dogs	L 21–28	0–2	Frank Clair Stadium	19,696

== Regular season ==
=== Season standings ===
North Division
Pos	Team	Pld	W	L	T	PF	PA	PD	Pts	Div	Stk
1	Calgary Stampeders (Q)	18	15	3	0	631	404	227	30	9–2	L1
2	Edmonton Eskimos (Q)	18	13	5	0	599	359	240	26	9–3	W6
3	BC Lions (Q)	18	10	8	0	535	470	65	20	7–6	W1
4	Hamilton Tiger-Cats (Q)	18	8	10	0	427	509	−82	16	5–4	L2
5	Winnipeg Blue Bombers (Q)	18	7	11	0	404	653	−249	14	5–7	W2
6	Saskatchewan Roughriders	18	6	12	0	422	451	−29	12	5–7	L2
7	Toronto Argonauts	18	4	14	0	376	519	−143	8	3–9	W1
8	Ottawa Rough Riders	18	3	15	0	348	685	−337	6	3–8	L1

Source: "CFL.ca". Archived from the original on 2009-07-15.
(Q) Qualified for playoffs

== Regular season ==
=== Schedule ===
Week	Game	Date	Opponent	Results		Venue	Attendance
Week	Game	Date	Opponent	Score	Record	Venue	Attendance
1	1	June 28	vs. Winnipeg Blue Bombers	W 25–15	1–0	Frank Clair Stadium	23,241
2	2	July 6	at Toronto Argonauts	L 24–37	1–1	SkyDome	18,404
3	3	July 13	vs. Calgary Stampeders	L 7–57	1–2	Frank Clair Stadium	24,861
4	4	July 19	vs. Memphis Mad Dogs	L 20–23	1–3	Frank Clair Stadium	21,221
5	5	July 27	at BC Lions	L 11–48	1–4	BC Place	22,226
6	6	Aug 4	vs. Saskatchewan Roughriders	L 20–31	1–5	Frank Clair Stadium	20,830
7	7	Aug 13	vs. Edmonton Eskimos	W 18–17	2–5	Frank Clair Stadium	20,012
8	8	Aug 18	at Shreveport Pirates	L 11–61	2–6	Independence Stadium	11,554
9	9	Aug 23	at Saskatchewan Roughriders	L 16–31	2–7	Taylor Field	21,615
10	10	Aug 27	at Edmonton Eskimos	L 3–63	2–8	Commonwealth Stadium	28,135
11	11	Sept 1	vs. Birmingham Barracudas	L 46–56	2–9	Frank Clair Stadium	20,062
12	12	Sept 9	vs. BC Lions	L 24–43	2–10	Frank Clair Stadium	22,564
13	13	Sept 17	at Birmingham Barracudas	L 9–40	2–11	Legion Field	5,289
14	Bye						
15	14	Sept 30	vs. San Antonio Texans	L 14–49	2–12	Frank Clair Stadium	19,957
16	15	Oct 8	at Memphis Mad Dogs	L 7–26	2–13	Liberty Bowl Memorial Stadium	12,437
17	16	Oct 12	at San Antonio Texans	L 30–43	2–14	Alamodome	10,027
18	17	Oct 21	vs. Hamilton Tiger-Cats	W 30–9	3–14	Frank Clair Stadium	17,160
19	18	Oct 29	at Winnipeg Blue Bombers	L 33–36	3–15	Winnipeg Stadium	27,022

== Roster ==
1995 Ottawa Rough Riders final roster
Quarterbacks: 15 Sammy Garza; 16 Jay Macias; 10 Andre Ware; Running backs: 21 Dave Dinnall; 32 Mike Richardson; 33 Deon Strother; Receivers: 88 Ray Alexander; 4 Kerry Brown; 83 Jay Christensen; 85 James Ellingson; 13 Ken Evraire; 80 Odessa Turner; 18 Nigel Williams	Offensive linemen: 61 Kai Bjorn T; 51 David Black G; 57 Chris Burns T; 68 Scott Douglas G; 67 Mike Jovanovich T; 59 James Monroe C; 55 Mike Schad G; Defensive linemen: 73 John Kropke DT; 76 Loyd Lewis DE; 79 Derek MacCready DE; 99 Paul Yatkowski DT; Special teams: 9 Wayne Lammle K/P	Linebackers: 95 Ray Bernard; 48 Charlie Clemons; 44 DeWayne Knight; 97 Horace Morris; 47 Stefan Reid; 45 Nick Richards; 94 Chris Tsangaris; 35 Ricardo Washington; Defensive backs: 22 Antonious Bonner; 19 Eric Geter; 7 Manny Martin; 32 Dallas Rysavy; 24 Remi Trudel; 23 Brett Young	Injured list: 8 Danny Barrett QB; 2 Horace Brooks DB; 37 Jermaine Chaney RB; 54 Irv Daymond C; 39 Jeff Koradi FB; Italics indicate International player

== Awards and honours ==
=== 1995 CFL All-Stars ===
- None

=== Northern All-Stars ===
- DT – John Kropke, CFL Northern All-Star
- DB – Brett Young, CFL Northern All-Star
