= 1995 Birmingham Barracudas season =

- Owner: Art Williams
- General manager: Roy Shivers
- Head coach: Jack Pardee
- Home stadium: Legion Field

Results
- Record: 10–8
- Division place: 3rd, South
- Playoffs: Lost South Semi-Final

Uniform
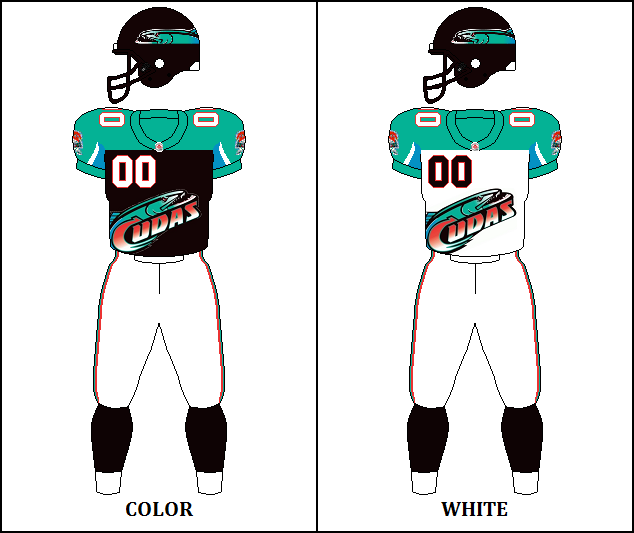

The 1995 Birmingham Barracudas season was the first and only season in their franchise history. The Barracudas finished third in the South Division with a 10–8 record. The Barracudas signed high-profile free agent Matt Dunigan as a free agent in 1995, and he set career bests with 362 completions on 643 attempts for 4,911 yards and 34 touchdown passes in only 15 games. They lost in the South Division Semi-Final to the San Antonio Texans.

== Preseason ==
Game	Date	Opponent	Results		Venue	Attendance
Game	Date	Opponent	Score	Record	Venue	Attendance
A	Fri, June 16	at Shreveport Pirates	L 28–31	0–1	Independence Stadium	
B	Sat, June 24	vs. Baltimore Stallions	L 0–37	0–2	Miami Orange Bowl	20,250

== Regular season ==
=== Season standings ===
South Division
Pos	Team	Pld	W	L	T	PF	PA	PD	Pts	Div	Stk
1	Baltimore Stallions (Q)	18	15	3	0	541	369	172	30	6–1	W10
2	San Antonio Texans (Q)	18	12	6	0	630	457	173	24	5–3	W3
3	Birmingham Barracudas (Q)	18	10	8	0	548	518	30	20	3–4	L2
4	Memphis Mad Dogs	18	9	9	0	346	364	−18	18	4–3	L1
5	Shreveport Pirates	18	5	13	0	465	514	−49	10	0–8	L2

Source: "CFL.ca". Archived from the original on July 15, 2009.
(Q) Qualified for playoffs

=== Season schedule ===
Week	Game	Date	Opponent	Results		Venue	Attendance
Week	Game	Date	Opponent	Score	Record	Venue	Attendance
1	Bye						
2	1	Tues, July 4	at Winnipeg Blue Bombers	W 38–10	1–0	Winnipeg Stadium	22,208
2	2	Sat, July 8	at Hamilton Tiger-Cats	L 13–31	1–1	Ivor Wynne Stadium	23,042
3	3	Sat, July 15	Hamilton Tiger-Cats	W 51–28	2–1	Legion Field	31,185
4	4	Sat, July 22	Saskatchewan Roughriders	W 24–14	3–1	Legion Field	25,321
5	5	Sat, July 29	Baltimore Stallions	L 8–36	3–2	Legion Field	30,729
6	6	Thurs, Aug 3	at BC Lions	L 23–30	3–3	BC Place	21,948
7	7	Sat, Aug 12	Winnipeg Blue Bombers	W 50–24	4–3	Legion Field	17,328
8	8	Fri, Aug 18	at Calgary Stampeders	W 31–28	5–3	McMahon Stadium	25,129
9	9	Sat, Aug 26	Calgary Stampeders	L 14–37	5–4	Legion Field	19,652
10	10	Fri, Sept 1	at Ottawa Rough Riders	W 56–46	6–4	Frank Clair Stadium	20,062
11	11	Sat, Sept 9	at Baltimore Stallions	L 20–28	6–5	Memorial Stadium	29,013
12	12	Sun, Sept 17	Ottawa Rough Riders	W 40–9	7–5	Legion Field	5,289
13	13	Sun, Sept 24	at Memphis Mad Dogs	L 19–28	7–6	Liberty Bowl Memorial Stadium	13,797
14	14	Sun, Oct 1	Shreveport Pirates	W 34–20	8–6	Legion Field	6,314
15	15	Sun, Oct 8	San Antonio Texans	W 38–28	9–6	Legion Field	6,859
16	16	Fri, Oct 13	at Shreveport Pirates	W 29–28	10–6	Independence Stadium	21,117
17	17	Thurs, Oct 19	Edmonton Eskimos	L 18–45	10–7	Legion Field	8,910
18	18	Sun, Oct 29	at San Antonio Texans	L 42–48	10–8	Alamodome	19,025

== Playoffs ==
=== South Semi-Final ===
Team	Q1	Q2	Q3	Q4	Total
Birmingham Barracudas	6	0	3	0	9
San Antonio Texans	14	24	0	14	52

== Player stats ==
=== Passing ===
Player	Games played	Attempts	Completions	Yards	Pct.	Interceptions	Long	Touchdowns
Matt Dunigan	18	643	362	4911	56.3	16	71	34
Kelvin Simmons	16	39	26	292	66.7	1	N/A	3

=== Receiving ===
Player	Games played	Receptions	Yards	Avg.	Long	Touchdowns
Eddie Britton	15	49	681	13.9	71	4
Marcus Grant	18	84	1559	18.6	86	11
Willie McClendon	1	4	55	13.8	0	19

=== Rushing ===
Player	Games played	Rushes	Yards	Avg.	Long	Touchdowns
Kelvin Simmons	16	17	136	8.0	24	3
Willie McClendon	1	6	43	7.2	20	1

=== Kicking ===
Note: FGA = Field goals attempted; FGM = Field goals made; FG% = Field goal percentage; XPA = Extra points attempted; XPM = Extra points made; XP% = Extra points percentage

Player	Games	FGA	FGM	FG %	XPA	XPM	XP %
Luis Zendejas	12	43	34	79.1%	38	38	100.0%

==== Kickoff returns ====
Player	Kickoff returns	Yards	Avg.	Touchdowns	Long
Eddie Britton	24	401	16.7	0	29
Willie McClendon	6	43	7.2	20	1

== Roster ==
1995 Birmingham Barracudas final roster
Quarterbacks: 16 Matt Dunigan; 15 Jimmy Klingler; 14 Kelvin Simmons; Running backs: 32 Drew David; 19 Donald Moffett; 31 Keith Woodside; Receivers: 88 Schredrick Austin; 1 Eddie Britton; 5 Mac Cody; 81 Marcus Grant; 86 Ted Long; 85 Delius Morris; 20 Jason Phillips; 82 Prince Wimbley	Offensive linemen: 62 Freddie Childress G/T; 53 Chris Dyko T; 61 Craig Gibson C; 59 York Kurinsky G/T; 69 Jeff Neal G/C; 68 Roosevelt Patterson G; 55 Tom Rayam T; Defensive linemen: 92 Steve Anderson DE; 96 Sean Brantley DT; 99 Akaba Delaney DT; 33 Kyle Faulkner DE; 49 Donovan Gans DE; 94 Mark Ledbetter DT; 56 Shonte Peoples DE	Linebackers: 37 Steve Henley; 48 Mike James; 93 William Kirksey; 39 Jimmy Reed; 91 Angelo Snipes; Defensive backs: 6 Matt Clizbe; 25 Eddie Davis; 7 Anthony Drawhorn; 23 Tommy Oates; 28 Sam Peoples; 9 Bobby Roland; 4 Andre Strode; 3 Fernando Thomas; 2 Junior Thurman; Special teams: 12 Scott Player P; 10 Luis Zendejas K; Italics indicate American player

== Awards and honors ==
=== CFL All-Stars ===
- Anthony Drawhorn, Defensive back
- Matt Dunigan, Quarterback

=== CFL Southern All-Stars ===
- Fred Childress, Offensive guard
- Anthony Drawhorn, Defensive back
- Matt Dunigan, Quarterback
- Marcus Grant, Wide receiver
- Jason Phillips, Slotback
- Andre Strode, Defensive back
