= 1995 Edmonton Eskimos season =

Canadian football team season

- General manager: Hugh Campbell
- Head coach: Ron Lancaster
- Home stadium: Commonwealth Stadium

Results
- Record: 13–5
- Division place: 2nd, North
- Playoffs: Lost North Final

Uniform

The 1995 Edmonton Eskimos finished in second place in the North Division with a 13–5 record. They appeared in the North Final.

== Offseason ==
=== CFL draft ===
Round	Pick	Player	Position	School
0	5	Hitchem El Mashtoub	C	Arizona
1	13	Mark Lawson	DB/LB	Western Ontario
2	21	Derrick Sholdice	OT	Northern Illinois
3	28	Blake Bunting	TE	Evangel College
4	36	Kevin Algajer	LB	Alberta
5	44	Steve Dallison	DL	Alberta
6	52	Stewart Beak	TE	Western Ontario

=== Schedule ===
Game	Date	Opponent	Results		Venue	Attendance
Game	Date	Opponent	Score	Record	Venue	Attendance
A	Tue, June 13	vs. BC Lions	W 23–22	1–0	Commonwealth Stadium	39,293
B	Thu, June 22	at Calgary Stampeders	L 34–42 OT	1–1	McMahon Stadium	

== Regular season ==
=== Season standings ===
North Division
Pos	Team	Pld	W	L	T	PF	PA	PD	Pts	Div	Stk
1	Calgary Stampeders (Q)	18	15	3	0	631	404	227	30	9–2	L1
2	Edmonton Eskimos (Q)	18	13	5	0	599	359	240	26	9–3	W6
3	BC Lions (Q)	18	10	8	0	535	470	65	20	7–6	W1
4	Hamilton Tiger-Cats (Q)	18	8	10	0	427	509	−82	16	5–4	L2
5	Winnipeg Blue Bombers (Q)	18	7	11	0	404	653	−249	14	5–7	W2
6	Saskatchewan Roughriders	18	6	12	0	422	451	−29	12	5–7	L2
7	Toronto Argonauts	18	4	14	0	376	519	−143	8	3–9	W1
8	Ottawa Rough Riders	18	3	15	0	348	685	−337	6	3–8	L1

Source: "CFL.ca". Archived from the original on 2009-07-15.
(Q) Qualified for playoffs

=== Season schedule ===
Week	Game	Date	Opponent	Results		Venue	Attendance
Week	Game	Date	Opponent	Score	Record	Venue	Attendance
1	1	Sat, July 1	vs. Toronto Argonauts	W 45–23	1–0	Commonwealth Stadium	27,465
2	2	Fri, July 7	at Saskatchewan Roughriders	W 26–19 OT	2–0	Taylor Field	23,584
3	3	Mon, July 17	vs. Shreveport Pirates	L 7–37	3–0	Commonwealth Stadium	29,463
4	4	Sat, July 22	at San Antonio Texans	L 27–32	3–1	Alamodome	12,856
5	5	Fri, July 28	at Hamilton Tiger-Cats	W 26–18	4–1	Ivor Wynne Stadium	20,104
6	6	Wed, Aug 2	vs. Baltimore Stallions	L 12–19	4–2	Commonwealth Stadium	30,698
7	7	Wed, Aug 9	at Toronto Argonauts	W 31–10	5–2	SkyDome	14,192
7	8	Sun, Aug 13	at Ottawa Rough Riders	L 17–18	5–3	Ivor Wynne Stadium	20,012
8	9	Fri, Aug 18	vs. Saskatchewan Roughriders	W 32–13	6–3	Commonwealth Stadium	30,204
9	10	Sun, Aug 27	vs. Ottawa Rough Riders	W 63–3	7–3	Commonwealth Stadium	28,135
10	11	Mon, Sept 4	at Calgary Stampeders	L 26–51	7–4	McMahon Stadium	37,317
11	12	Fri, Sept 8	vs. Calgary Stampeders	L 17–33	7–5	Commonwealth Stadium	49,434
12	13	Fri, Sept 15	vs. Winnipeg Blue Bombers	W 64–10	8–5	Commonwealth Stadium	27,718
13	14	Fri, Sept 22	at BC Lions	W 33–18	9–5	BC Place	32,837
14	15	Sun, Oct 1	vs. BC Lions	W 39–36	10–5	Commonwealth Stadium	30,046
15	Bye						
16	16	Fri, Oct 13	vs. Memphis Mad Dogs	W 34–17	11–5	Commonwealth Stadium	30,111
17	17	Thu, Oct 19	at Birmingham Barracudas	W 45–18	12–5	Legion Field	8,910
18	18	Thu, Oct 26	at Memphis Mad Dogs	W 25–14	13–5	Liberty Bowl Memorial Stadium	12,078

Total attendance: 283,274
Average attendance: 31,475 (52.4%)

== Awards and records ==
=== 1995 CFL All-Stars ===
- DT – Bennie Goods
- LB – Willie Pless
- DB – Glenn Rogers Jr.

=== Offence ===
- FB – Michael Soles, Edmonton Eskimos
- C – Rod Connop, Edmonton Eskimos

=== Defence ===
- DT – Bennie Goods, Edmonton Eskimos
- LB – Willie Pless, Edmonton Eskimos
- DB – Glenn Rogers Jr., Edmonton Eskimos

== Playoffs ==
Round	Date	Opponent	Results		Venue	Attendance
Round	Date	Opponent	Score	Record	Venue	Attendance
Division semi-final	Sun, Nov 5	vs. BC Lions	W 26–15	1–0	Commonwealth Stadium	28,817
Division final	Sun Nov 12	at Calgary Stampeders	L 4–37	1–1	McMahon Stadium	30,894

=== North semi-final ===
Team	Q1	Q2	Q3	Q4	Total
Edmonton Eskimos	?	?	?	?	26
BC Lions	?	?	?	?	15

=== North final ===
Team	Q1	Q2	Q3	Q4	Total
Calgary Stampeders	?	?	?	?	37
Edmonton Eskimos	?	?	?	?	4

== Roster ==
1995 Edmonton Eskimos final roster
Quarterbacks: 12 Kerwin Bell; 11 Anthoney Hill; 16 Chris Vargas; Running backs: 35 Eric Blount; 32 Michael Soles; 34 Brian Walling; Receivers: 5 Shalon Baker; 88 Eddie Brown; 23 J. P. Izquierdo; 80 Nick Mazzoli; 7 Jim Sandusky; 31 Marc Tobert; 2 Gizmo Williams	Offensive linemen: 67 Rod Connop C; 50 Blake Dermott G/T; 53 Chris Green T; 59 Leo Groenewegen G; 58 Craig Hendrickson G; 60 Chris Morris T; Defensive linemen: 89 Leroy Blugh DE; 40 Bennie Goods DT; 46 Malvin Hunter DE; 43 Jed Roberts DE/DT; 91 Tony Woods DT; Special teams: 3 Sean Fleming K; 18 Glenn Harper P	Linebackers: 36 Bruce Dickson; 38 Errol Martin; 39 Willie Pless; 47 Larry Wruck; Defensive backs: 28 Trent Brown; 4 Darian Hagan; 17 John Holland; 19 John Kalin; 27 Singor Mobley; 24 Kavis Reed; 26 Glenn Rogers; 20 Gary Wilkerson	Injured list: 90 David Bailey DT; 6 Hency Charles DB; 30 Gerry Collins RB; 75 C. J. Davis SB; 56 Steve Krupey G; 25 Morris Lolar DB; 95 Pat McNerney DT; 94 Mike Sellers DE; Italics indicate American player
