= Mike Faragalli =

American football player and coach (born 1958)

Biographical details
- Born: 1958 (age 67–68); Philadelphia, Pennsylvania, U.S.

Coaching career (HC unless noted)
- 1979–1981: Rhode Island (GA/WR)
- 1982: Wisconsin (WR)
- 1983–1984: William & Mary (WR)
- 1985–1986: Hamilton Tiger-Cats (OC)
- 1987: Montreal Alouettes (OC)
- 1988–1990: Edmonton Eskimos (OC)
- 1991–1994: Bowling Green (OC)
- 1995: Toronto Argonauts
- 1996–1999: Bowling Green (OC)
- 2000–2007: Lafayette (OC/QB)
- 2008–2009: Richmond (OC/QB)
- 2010–2012: Virginia (RB)
- 2013: Virginia State (QB)
- 2014: Christopher Newport (QB/ST)
- 2015: Columbia (OC)
- 2016–2017: Norfolk State (OC/TE)
- 2018–2021: Ave Maria (OC/QB)

Michael Faragalli (born 1958) is an American college football coach. He is the former running backs coach at the University of Virginia and was the offensive coordinator and quarterbacks coach at the University of Richmond. He is also a former head coach of the Toronto Argonauts.

Faragalli played defensive back at the University of Rhode Island from 1975 to 1978. He began his coaching career as a graduate assistant and later wide receivers coach at the Rhode Island in 1979. He held the same position as receivers coach at the University of Wisconsin–Madison and the College of William & Mary.

In 1985, he was hired by the Hamilton Tiger-Cats to serve as Al Bruno's offensive coordinator at the age of 26, losing the Grey Cup in his first season and winning it the following season. In 1987, he moved to the Montreal Alouettes to serve as offensive coordinator under his father, Joe, however, the team folded before the season began. In 1988 Faragalli rejoined his dad, now coach of the Edmonton Eskimos as offensive coordinator. In his three seasons in Edmonton, the team advanced to the Western Conference title game each season and led the Eskimos to a 50–11 Grey Cup loss in 1990. He also helped develop quarterback Tracy Ham, who was the CFL Most Outstanding Player in 1989.

From 1991 to 1994 and 1996 to 1999, Faragalli guided the offensive attack at Bowling Green State University. The Falcons led the Mid-American Conference in scoring offense in four of his eight seasons and ranked 13th in the nation in rushing offense in 1998. He helped lead the team to two bowl championships, the California Raisin Bowl in 1991 and the Las Vegas Bowl in 1992.

In 1995 Faragalli was hired to coach the Toronto Argonauts. His contract was terminated by GM Bob O'Billovich, in order for O'Billovich to again take control of the head coach position. This was in part due to the Argonauts being on the verge of folding. At season's end, Faragalli returned to Bowling Green for the latter of his two stints as offensive coordinator.

In 2000 Faragalli was hired by Lafayette as offensive coordinator and quarterbacks coach. Faragalli's passing offense has ranked either first or second in the Patriot League in five of his first six seasons.

On February 5, 2008, Faragalli was named offensive coordinator and quarterbacks coach for the Richmond Spiders football team. The Spiders went 13–3 during the 2008 season, which set a record for the most won games in a season. Richmond went on to the playoffs and then to the Division I National Championship game on December 19, 2008, in Chattanooga, Tennessee. They beat the Montana Grizzlies 24–7, winning Richmond's first national championship in any sport.

On December 6, 2009, Faragalli and the Richmond Spiders ended their season with a quarterfinal loss to Appalachian State, 34–31. The Spiders had a record season posting an 11–1 regular season record while adding a 12th victory in the opening round of the playoffs.

== Head coaching record ==
Team	Year	Regular season					Postseason		
Team	Year	Won	Lost	Ties	Win %	Finish	Won	Lost	Result
TOR	1995	2	7	0	.222	7th in North Division	-	-	Fired mid-season
Total		2	7	0	.222	0 Division Championships	0	0	0 Grey Cups
