= Troy Alexander =

Canadian gridiron football player (born 1971)

Profile
- Position: Defensive tackle

Personal information
- Born: August 16, 1971 (age 55); Edmonton, Alberta, Canada
- Listed height: 6 ft 0 in (1.83 m)
- Listed weight: 245 lb (111 kg)

Career information
- College: Eastern Washington
- CFL draft: 1995: Bonusth round, 4th overall pick

Career history
- 1995–1997: Saskatchewan Roughriders
- 1998: BC Lions
- 1999: Montreal Alouettes*
- * Offseason or practice squad member only

Troy Alexander (born August 16, 1971) is a Canadian former professional football defensive tackle who played for the Saskatchewan Roughriders, the BC Lions, and the Montreal Alouettes of the Canadian Football League. From 1995 to 1998, he played in 48 regular season games and recorded 68 tackles and 12 sacks. He also recovered two fumbles and deflected one pass.

== Professional career ==
Prior to the 1995 CFL draft, Alexander was considered to be the most talented defensive lineman available based on his participation at a CFL evaluation camp. He was widely projected to be taken in the first two rounds of the draft. Alexander was selected in the bonus round with the fourth overall pick of the draft by the Saskatchewan Roughriders. (Note: The 1995 CFL Draft included a bonus round before the first round, where all teams who met the new $2.5 million salary cap would receive an extra pick.) As a rookie, he played in 16 regular season games and made 24 tackles and one sack. Alexander was the Roughriders' nominee for Rookie of the Year. He recorded 13 tackles through 10 games in 1996 after missing over a month due to a back injury.

Alexander had his most successful season in 1997. He recorded three sacks on July 4 against the Edmonton Eskimos and led the CFL in sacks through the end of July. Alexander made 28 tackles and 10 sacks in 1997, both career-highs. He played in his only Grey Cup in the postseason, where the Roughriders lost the 85th Grey Cup to the Toronto Argonauts 47–23. Alexander became a free agent before the 1998 season and signed with the BC Lions. He dealt with injuries in 1998, playing in only 10 games. The Montreal Alouettes acquired Alexander for training camp in 1999, but he left following a knee injury.
