= Roman Anderson =

English gridiron football player (born 1969)

No. 14
- Position: Placekicker

Personal information
- Born: April 19, 1969 (age 57); London, England
- Listed height: 5 ft 10 in (1.78 m)
- Listed weight: 190 lb (86 kg)

Career information
- High school: Clements (Sugar Land, Texas)
- College: Houston
- NFL draft: 1992: undrafted

Career history
- Minnesota Vikings (1992)*; Cincinnati Bengals (1993)*; Cleveland Browns (1993)*; Sacramento Gold Miners (1994); San Antonio Texans (1995); Kansas City Chiefs (1996)*
- * Offseason or practice squad member only

Awards and highlights
- CFL All-Star (1995); CFL South All-Star (1995); Second-team All-American (1990)

Career CFL statistics
- Field goals made: 95
- Field goals attempted: 120
- Field goal percentage: 79.2
- Points scored: 409

Roman Anderson (born April 19, 1969) is an English former professional football placekicker who played for the Sacramento Gold Miners and the San Antonio Texans of the Canadian Football League (CFL). Anderson played college football for the Houston Cougars. He also had stints in the National Football League (NFL) with the Minnesota Vikings, Cincinnati Bengals, Cleveland Browns and the Kansas City Chiefs.

== College career ==
Anderson played college football for the Houston Cougars of the University of Houston from 1988 to 1991. He played in 44 games and finished with a career field goal percentage 69.3% and 423 points, an NCAA record at the time. In 1991, he became the first NCAA player to exceed 400 career points. He currently holds school records at Houston for career and single season field goals made, kicking points in a season and tied for the longest field goal.

== Professional career ==
=== Minnesota Vikings ===
On May 27, 1992, Anderson signed with the Minnesota Vikings. He was later released from the team.

=== Cincinnati Bengals ===
On February 4, 1993, Anderson signed with the Cincinnati Bengals. On August 16, Anderson was waived by the Bengals.

=== Cleveland Browns ===
On August 18, the Cleveland Browns signed Anderson. He was released on August 24.

=== Sacramento Gold Miners ===
On April 28, 1994, Anderson signed with the Sacramento Gold Miners. In a game against the Baltimore CFLers on September 11, he scored the go ahead, 47-yard field goal to complete a comeback victory. On September 30, he would score six field goals in a 19–16 win against the Saskatchewan Roughriders. Anderson converted 40 out of 41 extra point attempts and made 39 out of 55 field goals.

=== San Antonio Texans ===
Anderson remained with the team after they relocated to San Antonio. In a game against the Birmingham Barracudas on October 29, he scored four field goals in a 48–42 victory. He would improve dramatically in the 1995 CFL season, leading the league in points scored (235) and finished with a field goal percentage of 86.2%. He was named a CFL Southern All-Star and a CFL All-Star.

=== Kansas City Chiefs ===
On March 18, 1996, Anderson signed with the Kansas City Chiefs. In a preseason game he kicked two field goals in a loss to the St. Louis Rams. He was waived by the Chiefs on August 20.

== CFL career statistics ==
Legend
	Led the league
**Bold**	Career high

Year	Team	GP	Overall FGs					PATs			Pts
Year	Team	GP	FGM	FGA	Pct	Lng	Sng	XPM	XPA	Pct	Pts
1994	SAC	**18**	39	55	70.9	52	**14**	40	41	97.6	174
1995	SAN	**18**	**56**	**65**	**86.2**	**55**	5	**62**	**63**	**98.4**	**235**
Career		36	95	120	79.2	55	19	102	104	98.1	409
