= Charles Anthony (Canadian football) =

American gridiron football player (born 1968)

No. 3, 9
- Position: Defensive back

Personal information
- Born: October 16, 1968 (age 58); Las Vegas, Nevada, U.S.
- Listed height: 6 ft 2 in (1.88 m)
- Listed weight: 195 lb (88 kg)

Career information
- High school: Western
- College: UNLV

Career history
- 1991: Calgary Stampeders
- 1992–1993: Saskatchewan Roughriders
- 1994–1995: Baltimore Stallions
- 1996: San Francisco 49ers*
- 1996: Tampa Bay Buccaneers*
- 1997: Miami Dolphins*
- 1997: Toronto Argonauts
- 1999: Edmonton Eskimos
- * Offseason or practice squad member only

Awards and highlights
- 2× Grey Cup champion (1995, 1997); CFL All-Star (1995); Second team All-Big West (1988)

Career statistics
- Total tackles: 273
- Forced fumbles: 1
- Fumble recoveries: 15
- Pass deflections: 15
- Interceptions: 19

Charles Anthony (born October 16, 1968) is an American former professional football defensive back who played in the Canadian Football League (CFL). He played college football at UNLV.

== Early life ==
Anthony was born and grew up in Las Vegas, Nevada and attended Western High School.

== College career ==
Anthony was a member of the UNLV Rebels for four seasons. As a sophomore he was named second team All-Big West after leading the team with three interceptions and blocking six kicks. Anthony also led the team in interceptions as a junior. Anthony finished his collegiate career with 184 tackles, six interceptions, and five passes broken up in 39 games played.

== Professional career ==
Anthony was signed by the Calgary Stampeders of the Canadian Football League (CFL) and spent most of the 1991 season on the team's practice roster, appearing in two games and moving from cornerback to defensive halfback. He was signed by the Saskatchewan Roughriders in 1992 and in his first full season recorded 47 tackles with three interceptions and a fumble recovery. In 1993 he recorded 56 tackles with five interceptions. After two seasons with Saskatchewan, Anthony turned down training camp offers from the Atlanta Falcons, Cleveland Browns, and Seattle Seahawks and instead signed a two-year contract with Baltimore CFL Colts (later Baltimore Stallions), formed as part of the CFL's attempted expansion into the United States. In 1995, Anthony made 48 tackles with four passes broken up and five interceptions, including one returned for a touchdown, and was named a CFL All-Star as the Stallions won the 83rd Grey Cup. He was signed by the San Francisco 49ers in 1996, but released at the end of training camp. He was signed by the Tampa Bay Buccaneers to their practice squad September. Anthony joined the Miami Dolphins during the offseason in 1997 but was cut during training camp. Anthony was signed by the Toronto Argonauts midway through the 1997 season and was a member of the team when they won the 85th Grey Cup at the end of the season. Anthony was signed by the Edmonton Eskimos in 1999 and retired at the end of the season.

== Post-playing career ==
Anthony returned to Western High School to become the school's head football coach in 2001. He later moved to Cheyenne High School, where he coached for five years and compiled a 42-12 record. Anthony later became a teacher and head football coach at Evergreen High School in Vancouver, Washington.
