= Anthony Drawhorn =

American gridiron football player (born 1965)

Profile
- Positions: Defensive back, Kick returner

Personal information
- Born: July 27, 1965 (age 61); Los Angeles, California, U.S.

Career information
- College: UNLV

Career history
- 1988–1990: BC Lions
- 1991–1993: Ottawa Rough Riders
- 1994: Saskatchewan Roughriders
- 1995: Birmingham Barracudas
- 1996: Saskatchewan Roughriders
- 1996–1997: Montreal Alouettes

Awards and highlights
- 2× CFL All-Star (1992, 1995); CFL East All-Star (1992)

Anthony Drawhorn (born July 27, 1965) is a former football player in the Canadian Football League (CFL) for ten years. Drawhorn played as a cornerback, halfback, and free safety for five different teams. He was a CFL All-Star five times. He played college football at UNLV. Drawhorn has 5 children.
