= 1995 CFL season =

Canadian Football League season

- Duration: June 28 – October 29, 1995
- North champions: Calgary Stampeders
- South champions: Baltimore Stallions

83rd Grey Cup
- Date: November 19, 1995
- Venue: Taylor Field, Regina
- Champions: Baltimore Stallions

CFL seasons
- ← 1994 1996 →

Canadian Football League team locations: North, South

The 1995 CFL season was the 38th season of the Canadian Football League, and the 42nd in modern-day Canadian football.

== CFL news in 1995 ==
=== Expansion, relocation, folding and realignment ===
Two more United States–based teams were admitted, the Birmingham Barracudas and the Memphis Mad Dogs. In the off-season the Sacramento Gold Miners moved to San Antonio to become the San Antonio Texans. The Texans would play their home games at the Alamodome, which is the only American stadium designed and built to accommodate a regulation Canadian football field. The Baltimore Football Club the only team in the Northeast US finally found themselves a new nickname and christened themselves the Stallions at the beginning of the second week of the season. In April 1995, the Las Vegas Posse, after a disastrous 1994 season, were slated to move to Jackson, Mississippi, and were included in draft schedules for the league that year; squabbles with the Posse's board of directors and an inability for potential new owners to come up with the funds to cover the team's operations prompted the CFL to suspend the team and disperse its roster instead.

With the admittance of the Barracudas and Mad Dogs, and in hopes of securing a television contract, the CFL undertook a realignment. The longstanding alignment of East and West was discontinued. All five U.S.-based teams would play in the South Division, while all eight Canadian teams would compete in the North Division. Five teams from the North and three from the South would qualify for the playoffs. To make up for the disparity, the lowest-seeded North Division playoff team played in the South Division playoffs against the top South Division team. This was a precursor to the CFL's current crossover playoff rule that would be instituted in 1997 although unlike the current rule, in 1995 the fifth place North Division team automatically "crossed over" regardless of how its record compared to those of the South Division teams. This meant that Winnipeg, which finished in fifth place in the North at 7–11, made the playoffs instead while Memphis, which finished fourth place in the South Division with a record of 9–9, was nevertheless denied a place in the postseason.

=== Uniform changes ===
The Toronto Argonauts revealed an all-new logo and colour scheme. Their new colours were dark blue, slate green and metallic silver. The new logo design was based on the "Jason and the Argonauts" premise featuring a side profile of a helmeted warrior facing one side and holding up a round shield with an "A" on it.

The Birmingham Barracudas released the design of their logo and uniforms prior to the season. Their team colours were black, blue, teal and burnt orange.

The Memphis Mad Dogs unveiled their new team colours as forest green, burgundy, black and gold.

All three teams got new jerseys with an unusual template. The jerseys had the team's primary logo printed super large on the lower part of one side of the jersey while player numbers', which were much smaller in size, on the opposite side of the player's upper torso. Similar jerseys were being used by teams of the World League of American Football.

As the Sacramento Gold Miners became the San Antonio Texans, they changed their logo from a pick axe striking gold to a logo of a head of a cowboy with a black hat and a red bandana scarf imposed on a large star. They also added burgundy to teal, old gold and black as their team colours.

The Ottawa Rough Riders reverted their team colour of light navy to black. They kept the colours metallic gold and red. The logo that was unveiled last season was retained with black substituting over from light navy. Also after the 1995 season, in time for the 1996 (and what would be their last season) the Rough Riders also returned to using a black helmet from a metallic gold one and back to black jerseys as they had worn from at least 1976 to 1993 inclusive instead of the red ones they wore in 1994 and 1995.

=== Game ball supplier ===
The Wilson company, which has supplied the NFL with their game balls since 1941, began supplying the game balls to the CFL this season, and has done so since then. Prior to this, the league used the Spalding J5V ball as their game ball.

=== The Grey Cup ===
The city of Regina played host to the Grey Cup game for the first time. In the game, viewers at home and at Taylor Field witnessed the Baltimore Stallions defeat the Calgary Stampeders, 37–20, becoming the first (and only) U.S.-based team to win the Grey Cup.

== Regular season standings ==
North Division
Pos	Team	Pld	W	L	T	PF	PA	PD	Pts	Div	Stk
1	Calgary Stampeders (Q)	18	15	3	0	631	404	227	30	9–2	L1
2	Edmonton Eskimos (Q)	18	13	5	0	599	359	240	26	9–3	W6
3	BC Lions (Q)	18	10	8	0	535	470	65	20	7–6	W1
4	Hamilton Tiger-Cats (Q)	18	8	10	0	427	509	−82	16	5–4	L2
5	Winnipeg Blue Bombers (Q)	18	7	11	0	404	653	−249	14	5–7	W2
6	Saskatchewan Roughriders	18	6	12	0	422	451	−29	12	5–7	L2
7	Toronto Argonauts	18	4	14	0	376	519	−143	8	3–9	W1
8	Ottawa Rough Riders	18	3	15	0	348	685	−337	6	3–8	L1

Source: "CFL.ca". Archived from the original on July 15, 2009.
(Q) Qualified for playoffs

South Division
Pos	Team	Pld	W	L	T	PF	PA	PD	Pts	Div	Stk
1	Baltimore Stallions (Q)	18	15	3	0	541	369	172	30	6–1	W10
2	San Antonio Texans (Q)	18	12	6	0	630	457	173	24	5–3	W3
3	Birmingham Barracudas (Q)	18	10	8	0	548	518	30	20	3–4	L2
4	Memphis Mad Dogs	18	9	9	0	346	364	−18	18	4–3	L1
5	Shreveport Pirates	18	5	13	0	465	514	−49	10	0–8	L2

Source: "CFL.ca". Archived from the original on July 15, 2009.
(Q) Qualified for playoffs

== Grey Cup playoffs ==
The Baltimore Stallions were the 1995 Grey Cup champions, defeating the Calgary Stampeders 37–20 at Regina's Taylor Field. The Stallions became the only U.S.-based team to win the Grey Cup. The Stallions' Tracy Ham (QB) was named the Grey Cup's Most Valuable Player and the Stampeders' Dave Sapunjis (SB) was the Grey Cup's Most Valuable Canadian.

=== Playoff bracket ===
November 4 & 5: Division Semifinals
S3	Birmingham Barracudas	9
S2	San Antonio Texans	52
South
N5	Winnipeg Blue Bombers	21
S1	Baltimore Stallions	36
N3	BC Lions	15
N2	Edmonton Eskimos	26
North
N4	Hamilton Tiger-Cats	13
N1	Calgary Stampeders	30

November 11 & 12: Division Finals
S2	San Antonio Texans	11
S1	Baltimore Stallions	21
N2	Edmonton Eskimos	4
N1	Calgary Stampeders	37

November 19: 83rd Grey Cup @ Taylor Field – Regina, SK
S1	Baltimore Stallions	37
N1	Calgary Stampeders	20

== CFL leaders ==
- CFL passing leaders
- CFL rushing leaders
- CFL receiving leaders

== 1995 CFL All-Stars ==
=== Offence ===
- QB – Matt Dunigan, Birmingham Barracudas
- FB – Mike Saunders, San Antonio Texans
- RB – Mike Pringle, Baltimore Stallions
- SB – Dave Sapunjis, Calgary Stampeders
- SB – Allen Pitts, Calgary Stampeders
- WR – Don Narcisse, Saskatchewan Roughriders
- WR – Earl Winfield, Hamilton Tiger-Cats
- C – Mike Kiselak, San Antonio Texans
- OG – Jamie Taras, BC Lions
- OG – Mike Withycombe, Baltimore Stallions
- OT – Rocco Romano, Calgary Stampeders
- OT – Neal Fort, Baltimore Stallions

=== Defence ===
- DT – Bennie Goods, Edmonton Eskimos
- DT – Jearld Baylis, Baltimore Stallions
- DE – Tim Cofield, Memphis Mad Dogs
- DE – Will Johnson, Calgary Stampeders
- LB – Alondra Johnson, Calgary Stampeders
- LB – O. J. Brigance, Baltimore Stallions
- LB – Willie Pless, Edmonton Eskimos
- CB – Eric Carter, Hamilton Tiger-Cats
- CB – Irvin Smith, Baltimore Stallions
- DB – Glenn Rogers Jr., Edmonton Eskimos
- DB – Charles Anthony, Baltimore Stallions
- DS – Anthony Drawhorn, Birmingham Barracudas

=== Special teams ===
- P – Josh Miller, Baltimore Stallions
- K – Roman Anderson, San Antonio Texans
- ST – Chris Wright, Baltimore Stallions

== 1995 Southern All-Stars ==
=== Offence ===
- QB – Matt Dunigan, Birmingham Barracudas
- FB – Mike Saunders, San Antonio Texans
- RB – Mike Pringle, Baltimore Stallions
- SB – Jason Phillips, Birmingham Barracudas
- SB – Chris Armstrong, Baltimore Stallions
- WR – Joe Horn, Memphis Mad Dogs
- WR – Marcus Grant, Birmingham Barracudas
- C – Mike Kiselak, San Antonio Texans
- OG – Fred Childress, Birmingham Barracudas
- OG – Mike Withycombe, Baltimore Stallions
- OT – Shar Pourdanesh, Baltimore Stallions
- OT – Neal Fort, Baltimore Stallions

=== Defence ===
- DT – Rodney Harding, Memphis Mad Dogs
- DT – Jearld Baylis, Baltimore Stallions
- DE – Tim Cofield, Memphis Mad Dogs
- DE – Elfrid Payton, Baltimore Stallions
- LB – Tracy Gravely, Baltimore Stallions
- LB – O. J. Brigance, Baltimore Stallions
- LB – David Harper, San Antonio Texans
- CB – Donald Smith, Memphis Mad Dogs
- CB – Irvin Smith, Baltimore Stallions
- DB – Andre Strode, Birmingham Barracudas
- DB – Charles Anthony, Baltimore Stallions
- DS – Anthony Drawhorn, Birmingham Barracudas

=== Special teams ===
- P – Josh Miller, Baltimore Stallions
- K – Roman Anderson, San Antonio Texans
- ST – Chris Wright, Baltimore Stallions

== 1995 Northern All-Stars ==
=== Offence ===
- QB – Jeff Garcia, Calgary Stampeders
- FB – Michael Soles, Edmonton Eskimos
- RB – Cory Philpot, BC Lions
- SB – Dave Sapunjis, Calgary Stampeders
- SB – Allen Pitts, Calgary Stampeders
- WR – Don Narcisse, Saskatchewan Roughriders
- WR – Earl Winfield, Hamilton Tiger-Cats
- C – Rod Connop, Edmonton Eskimos
- OG – Jamie Taras, BC Lions
- OG – Pierre Vercheval, Toronto Argonauts
- OT – Rocco Romano, Calgary Stampeders
- OT – Vic Stevenson, BC Lions

=== Defence ===
- DT – Bennie Goods, Edmonton Eskimos
- DT – John Kropke, Ottawa Rough Riders
- DE – Andrew Stewart, BC Lions
- DE – Will Johnson, Calgary Stampeders
- LB – Alondra Johnson, Calgary Stampeders
- LB – Mike O'Shea, Hamilton Tiger-Cats
- LB – Willie Pless, Edmonton Eskimos
- CB – Eric Carter, Hamilton Tiger-Cats
- CB – Marvin Coleman, Calgary Stampeders
- DB – Glenn Rogers Jr., Edmonton Eskimos
- DB – Brett Young, Ottawa Rough Riders
- DS – Tom Europe, BC Lions

=== Special teams ===
- P – Bob Cameron, Winnipeg Blue Bombers
- K – Mark McLoughlin, Calgary Stampeders
- ST – Sam Rogers, Hamilton Tiger-Cats

== 1995 CFL awards ==
- CFL's Most Outstanding Player Award – Mike Pringle (RB), Baltimore Stallions
- CFL's Most Outstanding Canadian Award – Dave Sapunjis (SB), Calgary Stampeders
- CFL's Most Outstanding Defensive Player Award – Willie Pless (LB), Edmonton Eskimos
- CFL's Most Outstanding Offensive Lineman Award – Mike Withycombe (OG), Baltimore Stallions
- CFL's Most Outstanding Rookie Award – Shalon Baker (WR), Edmonton Eskimos
- CFLPA's Outstanding Community Service Award – Mark McLoughlin (K), Calgary Stampeders
- CFL's Coach of the Year – Don Matthews, Baltimore Stallions
- Commissioner's Award – Don Wittman, CBC broadcaster
