= Brett Young (Canadian football) =

American gridiron football player (1967–2015)

No. 23, 7
- Position: Defensive back

Personal information
- Born: April 3, 1967; Carson, California, U.S.
- Died: March 3, 2015 (aged 47); Torrance, California, U.S.
- Listed height: 5 ft 10 in (1.78 m)
- Listed weight: 185 lb (84 kg)

Career information
- High school: Los Angeles (CA) Banning
- College: Oregon
- Supplemental draft: 1989: 8th round, 4th overall pick

Career history
- 1989–1992: Ottawa Rough Riders
- 1992: BC Lions
- 1992–1995: Ottawa Rough Riders
- 1996: Hamilton Tiger-Cats

Awards and highlights
- CFL Northern All-Star (1995)

Career CFL statistics
- Tackles: 312
- Interceptions: 17
- Quarterback sacks: 2
- Fumble recoveries: 5
- Total touchdowns: 2

Brett Young (April 3, 1967 – March 3, 2015) was an American professional football defensive back who played seven seasons in the Canadian Football League (CFL) with the Ottawa Rough Riders, BC Lions and Hamilton Tiger-Cats. He was drafted by the Buffalo Bills of the National Football League (NFL) in the eighth round of the 1989 NFL supplemental draft. He played college football at the University of Oregon and attended Phineas Banning High School in Los Angeles, California.

== College career ==
Young played for the Oregon Ducks from 1985 to 1988, recording nine interceptions. He was dismissed from the school for academic shortcomings in June 1989.

== Professional career ==
Young was selected by the Buffalo Bills of the NFL in the eighth round of the 1989 NFL supplemental draft.

On August 15, 1989, Young was signed to the practice roster of the Ottawa Rough Riders of the CFL. Due to injuries, he made his CFL debut, and first start, on August 21, 1989, against the Toronto Argonauts. He played in 24 games for the team from 1989 to 1990.

Young was traded to the BC Lions in 1992 for future considerations, which was later the rights to Bruce Beaton. He played in eleven games for the Lions in 1992.

Young returned to the Rough Riders late in the 1992 season and played in one game. He then played for the Rough Riders from 1993 to 1995, being named Ottawa's outstanding defensive player and earning CFL Northern All-Star honors in 1995.

Young was traded to the Hamilton Tiger-Cats with Horace Brooks and Jason Phillips for quarterback Steve Taylor in 1996. He played in twelve games for the Tiger-Cats during the 1996 season.

== Death ==
Young died of kidney failure on March 3, 2015, in Torrance, California.
