= 1995 Toronto Argonauts season =

CFL team season

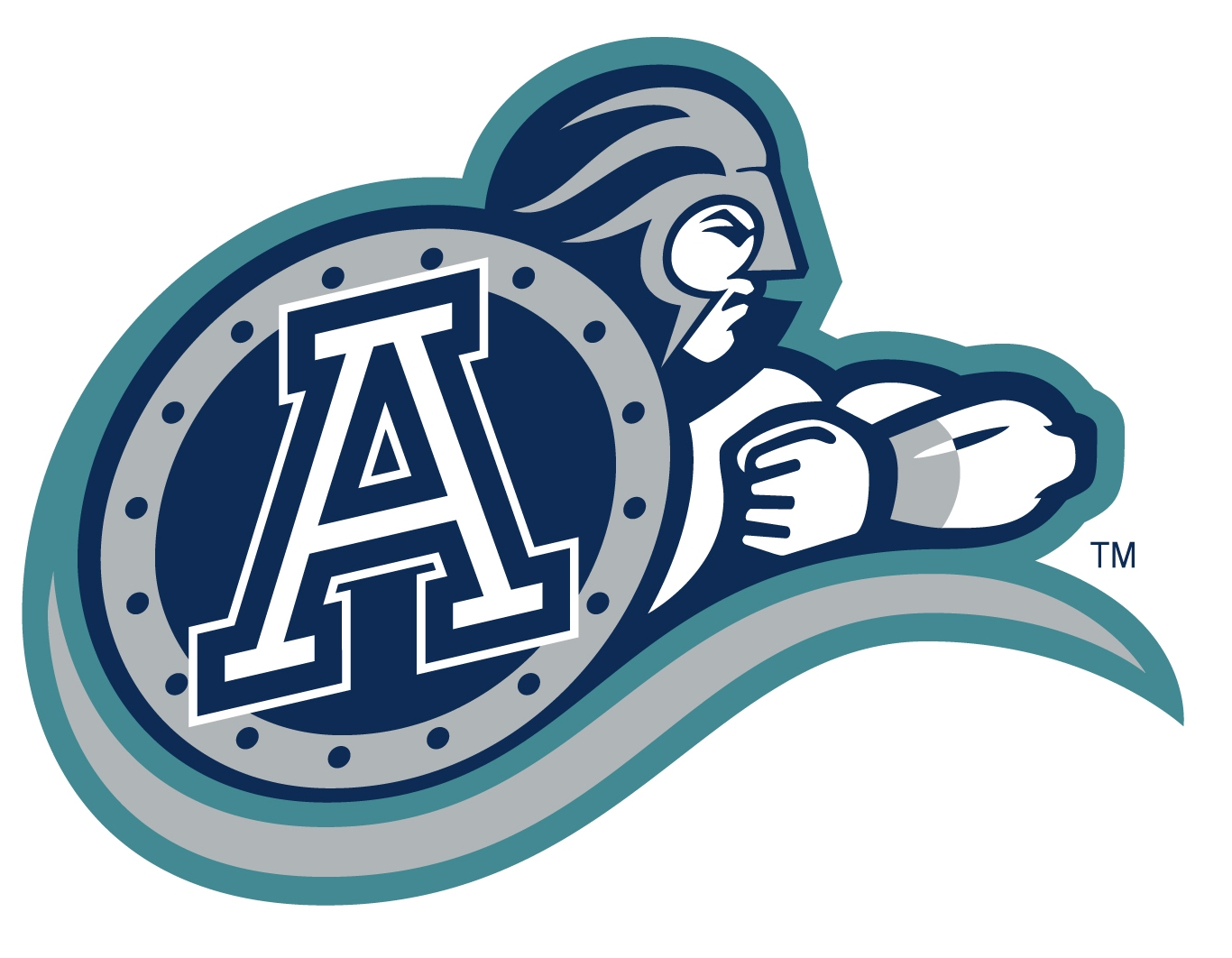
- General manager: Bob O'Billovich
- Head coach: Mike Faragalli: 2–7; Bob O'Billovich – (Interim) 2–7
- Home stadium: SkyDome

Results
- Record: 4–14
- Division place: 7th, North
- Playoffs: did not qualify

Uniform

The 1995 Toronto Argonauts finished in seventh place in the North Division with a 4–14 record and failed to make the playoffs. With the Argonauts sitting at 2-7, GM Bob O'Billovich fired first year head coach Mike Faragalli and took over the team on an interim basis. The team did not show any improvement, and finished down the stretch with an identical 2–7 record. Following the season, O'Billovich was fired.

== Offseason ==
=== Preseason ===
Week	Date	Opponent	Results		Venue	Attendance
Week	Date	Opponent	Score	Record	Venue	Attendance
A	Thu, June 15†	at Hamilton Tiger-Cats	L 17–33	0–1	Ivor Wynne Stadium	18,266
B	Sat, June 24	vs. Saskatchewan Roughriders	W 43–23	1–1	SkyDome	13,222

- † Canadian Football Hall of Fame Game

== Regular season ==
=== Standings ===
North Division
Pos	Team	Pld	W	L	T	PF	PA	PD	Pts	Div	Stk
1	Calgary Stampeders (Q)	18	15	3	0	631	404	227	30	9–2	L1
2	Edmonton Eskimos (Q)	18	13	5	0	599	359	240	26	9–3	W6
3	BC Lions (Q)	18	10	8	0	535	470	65	20	7–6	W1
4	Hamilton Tiger-Cats (Q)	18	8	10	0	427	509	−82	16	5–4	L2
5	Winnipeg Blue Bombers (Q)	18	7	11	0	404	653	−249	14	5–7	W2
6	Saskatchewan Roughriders	18	6	12	0	422	451	−29	12	5–7	L2
7	Toronto Argonauts	18	4	14	0	376	519	−143	8	3–9	W1
8	Ottawa Rough Riders	18	3	15	0	348	685	−337	6	3–8	L1

Source: "CFL.ca". Archived from the original on 2009-07-15.
(Q) Qualified for playoffs

=== Schedule ===
Week	Game	Date	Opponent	Results		Venue	Attendance
Week	Game	Date	Opponent	Score	Record	Venue	Attendance
1	1	Sat, July 1	at Edmonton Eskimos	L 23–45	0–1	Commonwealth Stadium	27,465
2	2	Thu, July 6	vs. Ottawa Rough Riders	W 37–24	1–1	SkyDome	18,404
3	3	Thu, July 13	at BC Lions	L 34–35	1–2	BC Place Stadium	24,276
4	4	Sat, July 22	at Shreveport Pirates	L 10–11	1–3	Independence Stadium	13,184
5	5	Sat, July 29	at Memphis Mad Dogs	W 10–7 (OT)	2–3	Liberty Bowl Memorial Stadium	20,183
6	6	Thu, Aug 3	vs. Hamilton Tiger-Cats	L 16–20 (OT)	2–4	SkyDome	19,174
7	7	Wed, Aug 9	vs. Edmonton Eskimos	L 10–31	2–5	SkyDome	14,192
7	8	Mon, Aug 14	vs. BC Lions	L 6–19	2–6	SkyDome	17,084
8	Bye						
9	9	Sat, Aug 26	at Baltimore Stallions	L 14–41	2–7	Memorial Stadium	27,853
10	10	Mon, Sept 4	vs. San Antonio Texans	L 27–48	2–8	SkyDome	14,593
11	11	Sat, Sept 9	at Hamilton Tiger-Cats	L 33–27	2–9	Ivor Wynne Stadium	24,280
12	12	Sat, Sept 16	at San Antonio Texans	L 21–42	2–10	Alamodome	16,028
13	13	Sat, Sept 23	Saskatchewan Roughriders	L 20–23	2–11	SkyDome	14,655
14	14	Sat, Sept 30	at Calgary Stampeders	L 26–19	2–12	McMahon Stadium	22,570
15	15	Mon, Oct 9	Winnipeg Blue Bombers	W 31–20	3–12	SkyDome	14,507
16	16	Sat, Oct 14	at Winnipeg Blue Bombers	L 30–44	3–13	Winnipeg Stadium	21,076
17	17	Fri, Oct 20	vs. Memphis Mad Dogs	L 10–28	3–14	SkyDome	14,122
18	18	Fri, October 27	vs. Calgary Stampeders	W 31–22	4–14	SkyDome	23,196

== Roster ==
1995 Toronto Argonauts final roster
Quarterbacks: 5 Kent Austin; 7 Marvin Graves; 1 Shawn Knight; Running backs: 31 Michael Clemons; 34 Duane Forde; 36 P. J. Martin; Receivers: 35 Norm Casola; 81 Jock Climie; 79 Rob Crifo; 28 Duane Dmytryshyn; 88 Paul Masotti; 78 Mike Morreale	Offensive linemen: 69 Joe Burgos T; 57 Carl Coulter C; 68 Scott Douglas G; 53 Mike Dumaresq T; 58 Chris Gioskos G; 61 John Terry T; 59 Pierre Vercheval G; Defensive linemen: 98 Steve Brannon DE; 90 Swift Burch DE; 97 Noah Cantor DT; 99 Jeff Cummins DE; 44 Leon Hatziioannou DT; 96 Lubo Zizakovic DT	Linebackers: 70 Sheldon Benoit; 39 Brett Collins; 38 Joe Sardo; 73 Calvin Tiggle; Defensive backs: 13 Greg Eaglin; 29 Joe Fuller; 6 Tommy Henry; 16 Maurice Kelly; 3 Joe Mero; 17 Dan Murphy; 9 Marcello Simmons; 24 Ken Walcott; 20 Don Wilson; 15 Frank Yeboah-Kodie	Special teams: 15 Wayne Lammle K/P; Injured list: 30 Reggie Barnes RB; 86 Jimmy Cunningham WR; 27 Jayson Dzikowicz DB; 18 Jeff Fairholm SB; 95 Will Jennings DT; 80 John Morton WR; 21 George Nimako DB; 39 Tony O'Billovich LB; 84 Deron Pointer WR; 4 Kevin Whitley DB; Suspended: 19 Patrick Burke DB; Italics indicate International player

== Awards and honours ==
- Pinball Clemons, 1995 John Candy Memorial Award
