= Mike Withycombe =

American gridiron football player (born 1964)

No. 65
- Position: Guard

Personal information
- Born: November 18, 1964 (age 61); Meridian, Mississippi, U.S.

Career information
- High school: Lemoore
- College: Fresno State
- NFL draft: 1988: 5th round, 119th overall pick

Career history
- 1988–1989: New York Jets
- 1990-1991: San Diego Chargers
- 1991: Pittsburgh Steelers
- 1991–1992: Cincinnati Bengals
- 1993: San Diego Chargers
- 1994: Cleveland Browns*
- 1995: Baltimore Stallions
- 1996: Montreal Alouettes
- 1997: San Diego Chargers*
- 1997: BC Lions
- * Offseason or practice squad member only

Awards and highlights
- Grey Cup champion (1995); 2× CFL All-Star (1995, 1997); Leo Dandurand Trophy (1995)
- Stats at Pro Football Reference

William Michael Withycombe (born November 18, 1964) is an American former professional football offensive lineman who played three seasons in the Canadian Football League (CFL), mainly for the Baltimore Stallions. Previously he played four seasons in the National Football League (NFL) for three different teams after being selected 119th overall by the New York Jets in the fifth round of the 1988 NFL draft. He played college football at Fresno State University. He was a part of the Stallions' Grey Cup victory in 1995. He won the CFL's Most Outstanding Offensive Lineman Award in 1995.

On April 17, 2017, while in Las Vegas, Withycombe received media attention for stepping in to protect a female neighbor and her daughter from a man who was threatening to kill them. Withycombe, who had been sleeping in his home, was awakened by the sound of shouting. He put on the first garment at hand - a kilt - and headed outside to assess the situation. After Withycombe asked the intruder to leave, the man took a swing at him, so Withycombe tackled him and restrained him until police arrived on the scene. News reports indicate that Withycombe's unusual attire was a source of great amusement for the responding officers.
