= Sam Rogers (Canadian football) =

American gridiron football player (born 1973)

No. 30, 31
- Position: Defensive back

Personal information
- Born: June 24, 1973 (age 53); Houston, Texas, U.S.
- Listed height: 5 ft 11 in (1.80 m)
- Listed weight: 196 lb (89 kg)

Career information
- College: UTEP (1992–1994)

Career history
- Hamilton Tiger-Cats (1995–1997)

Awards and highlights
- CFL North All-Star (1995); CFL record: Longest punt return: 113 yards

Career CFL statistics
- Total tackles: 77
- Interceptions: 5
- Pass deflections: 12
- Kickoff return yards: 1,570
- Punt return yards: 1,176
- Return touchdowns: 2

Samuel Rogers Jr. (born June 24, 1973) is an American former professional football defensive back who played for the Hamilton Tiger-Cats of the Canadian Football League (CFL). Rogers played college football for the UTEP Miners.

== College career ==
Rogers played college football for the UTEP Miners from 1992 to 1994. He appeared in 29 games and featured mainly as a returner. In his three years he recorded 1,252 kickoff return yards for two touchdowns, 15 punt return yards and one interception.

== Professional career ==
Rogers signed with the Hamilton Tiger-Cats on May 24, 1995. On July 24, he set the record for the longest punt return in CFL history, by returning a punt for 113 yards early in the fourth quarter against the Memphis Mad Dogs. Rogers was named a CFL North All-Star in his rookie season. He played in 35 games for the Tiger-Cats and tallied 1,570 kick return yards, 1,176 punt return yards and two punt return touchdowns. On defense, he recorded 77 total tackles, three fumble recoveries, 12 pass deflections and five interceptions. On June 22, 1997, he was released by the team.
