= Reggie Carthon =

American gridiron football player (born 1971)

Reggie Carthon (born July 26, 1971 in Dallas, Texas), defensive back in the Canadian Football League (CFL) for the Winnipeg Blue Bombers. He attended Montana State.
