= Taylor Field =

Former stadium in Regina, Saskatchewan, Canada

Coordinates: 50°27′9.46″N 104°37′27.09″W

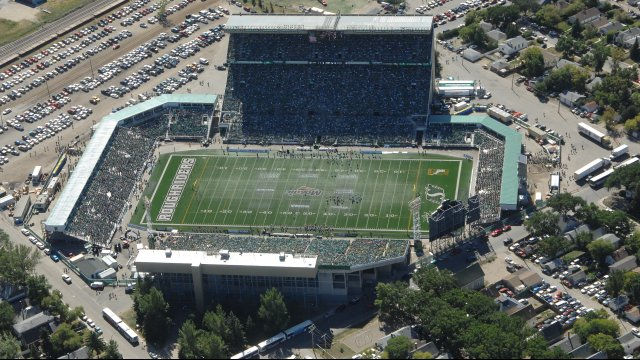
- Mosaic Stadium in its final configuration.
- Interactive map of Taylor Field
- Former names: Park de Young (1936–1946)
- Location: 1910 Piffles Taylor Way; P.O. Box 1966; Regina, Saskatchewan; S4P 3E1 (now replaced by the new Mosaic Stadium)
- Owner: Saskatchewan Roughriders football club
- Capacity: Football: 33,427 (55,438 with temporary seating)
- Surface: Dirt (1936–1946); Grass (1946–1978); 3M Tartan Turf (1979–1987); OmniTurf (1988–1999); AstroTurf (2000–2006); FieldTurf (2007–2016)
- Record attendance: 55,438 (Oct 14, 1995 vs Calgary Stampeders)

Construction
- Opened: October 21, 1936
- Renovated: 1936, 1978–79, 2005–06, 2012–13
- Closed: November 5, 2016
- Demolished: October 27, 2017

Tenants
- Saskatchewan Roughriders (CFL) (part-time 1921-1936, full-time 1936–2016); Regina Rams (U Sports); Regina Thunder (CJFL); Regina High School Football; Regina Riot (WWCFL)

Taylor Field, known in its latter years as Mosaic Stadium at Taylor Field for sponsorship reasons, was an open-air stadium located in Regina, Saskatchewan. It was the home field of the Canadian Football League's Saskatchewan Roughriders from 1936 until 2016, although a playing field existed at the site as early as 1910 and the team began playing there as early as 1921. Originally designed primarily to house baseball (with football being a secondary consideration) the stadium was converted to a football-only facility in 1966.

Taylor Field was also the home field for the University of Regina Rams, who play in U Sports' Canada West conference, the Regina Thunder, who play in the Canadian Junior Football League; and the Regina Riot of the Western Women's Canadian Football League. The field was also used to play high school football. It was owned and managed by the city of Regina. The field featured artificial turf and, as of 2012, a seating capacity of 32,848.

The stadium closed after the 2016 season, being succeeded by the new Mosaic Stadium at Evraz Place, which was completed in 2016 and became the Roughriders' home field beginning in the 2017 CFL season. Demolition of the stadium commenced in September 2017 and was completed on October 27, 2017. The site will be converted into a mixed use development.

== History ==
The stadium was located in the North Central portion of Regina. The first facility on the site, a rugby (Canadian football) field known as Park Hughes, was built in 1910.

In the same year that Park Hughes was built, the Regina Rugby Club was founded. For much of its first decade, the club played at venues such as Dominion Park (1910-1916) and the municipal exhibition grounds (1919-1921), the team played its first game at Park Hughes on October 15, 1921. The field had recently been enclosed with an eight-foot fence and configured to accommodate soccer as well as Canadian football. Nonetheless, it remained rudimentary even by the standards of the time. The playing surface was little more than plain dirt. When heavy rain turned the field to mud, the team was compelled to relocate games to other venues in the city, including the RCMP barracks. At the time, the barracks housed a unit informally called the Roughriders who were tasked with breaking in wild broncos for the force. In 1924, the Regina Rugby Club would adopt the Roughriders nickname as their own.

In 1928, the fence between Park Hughes and Park de Young, a neighbouring baseball field built in 1918, was removed, and the site was reconfigured into a larger venue under the Park de Young name to accommodate the growing number of fans. A football gridiron was laid out at the site. However, for a time between 1929 and 1936, the Roughriders moved their games back to the exhibition grounds, which could accommodate more spectators.

In 1936, a permanent 5,000-seat concrete grandstand was built at Park de Young. The team moved into the facility full-time and remained there for the next eight decades. Lights were added in 1937. However, for a decade after the first permanent seating was built, the playing surface remained dirt, with a new layer of topsoil added every year. Late-season games were frequently played in dust bowl conditions, and heavy rain turned it into a mud bath. Finally, in 1946, the city recreation board agreed to plant a more stable grass surface.

In 1947 the facility was renamed Taylor Field after recently deceased Neil J. "Piffles" Taylor, a First World War fighter pilot and postwar lawyer who played and coached rugby union and football in the city, and subsequently served as president of the Regina Roughriders, the Canadian Rugby Union and the Western Interprovincial Football Union. A man of legendary toughness, Taylor lost an eye in action during the First World War, and spent more than a year in a German prisoner of war camp, but persisted in playing football in the 1920s. His artificial glass eye was once jolted out of its socket when he was tackled. All play stopped while players from both teams hunted for the missing eye. When found, Taylor cleaned it, then popped it back into its socket and resumed play.

When the stadium was first built, minor league baseball was a relatively popular spectator sport in much of North America, including Western Canada. However, as Major League Baseball gained more exposure on the then-new medium of television, baseball attendances dropped to the point where venues like Taylor Field ceased to be economically viable ballparks. In 1966, a second permanent grandstand was constructed, significantly expanding capacity for Roughriders games while also effectively converting Taylor Field to a football-only stadium.

Former Rider receiver Hugh Campbell said in the documentary CFL Traditions in 2003. "When I first saw the stadium in Regina (in 1963), it looked like a farmer had built it, you know, like they'd just added on a few pieces here and there and half of the dressing room was dirt floor, where us rookies got to be. But we had a hook for everybody to hang their clothes on so that was a pretty good deal."

Renovations during 1978 and 1979 increased the seating capacity by about 7,000 seats with the addition of an upper-level grandstand on the west side of the stadium, in addition, the stadium gained an artificial turf surface (3M Tartan Turf) which replaced the natural grass surface previously used. This was, in turn, replaced with an OmniTurf system (a rudimentary forerunner of today's infilled artificial turfs that used sand as a support material) in 1988, which would be replaced by AstroTurf in 2000. In 2005, a new scoreboard was installed, which included the stadium's first permanent giant replay screen.

In 2005, Mosaic Stadium gained refurbished washrooms, concessions and refurbished seats on the east side, a new sound system, and the new SaskTel MaxTron video board. In 2006, a VIP deck and stands were put in place in the south endzone, allowing the football club to host its corporate game day sponsors. In 2007, the field was switched to the next-generation FieldTurf—Mosaic was the last stadium in the CFL to still use the old-style AstroTurf. In fact, it was the last in any major North American sport as it was last used in both Major League Baseball and the National Football League in 2004.

On June 23, 2006, the Roughriders and The Mosaic Company announced a 10-year, $3.75 million naming rights deal. Unlike other similar deals, which have seen original names of facilities disappear, it was decided to retain the Taylor Field name, thus the facility was renamed Mosaic Stadium at Taylor Field.

On July 31, 2008, the Roughriders announced that temporary seats would be added to the stadium due to high demand for tickets—the team had sold out every home game for the 2008 season. With tickets in high demand coming off their Grey Cup season, an extra 2,145 seats were added, bringing the capacity to 30,945. The seating was first put to use during the Labour Day Classic against the Winnipeg Blue Bombers. Following the 2008 West Semi-Final game on November 8, 2008 against the BC Lions, the temporary seats were taken down, putting the capacity back to the original number of 28,800. 2,145 temporary extra seats were put in place for 2009 season. Temporary seating was again put in place for the 2010 season; however, the additional seating only raised capacity to 30,048.

On February 24, 2012, the Roughriders announced a $14 million renovation plan known as the "Legacy Project" to prepare the stadium for hosting the 101st Grey Cup. Riders chairman Roger Brandvold was quoted as saying "Replacing Mosaic Stadium still remains our top priority, but certain upgrades needed to be made to get us through the next few years and especially the 2013 Grey Cup". The first stage of the renovations were finished in time for the start of the 2012 season, with the addition of 7,000 extra seats and 27 new corporate suites (arranged to give the stadium a more "bowl"-like feel), additional bathrooms and concessions, the SaskTel MaxTron video screen and scoreboard upgraded to a 60-foot LED screen (with a second display directly alongside, shaped like the province of Saskatchewan), a new 55-foot video screen attached to the west grandstand, and ribbon screens along the bottom of the grandstands. For the 2013 season, its capacity was expanded to 45,000 with temporary seating, which were removed for the following season.

== Notable events ==
=== Football and other sports ===
- Taylor Field was the venue for the 83rd, 91st and 101st Grey Cup games. A temporary grandstand seating for an additional 20,000-25,000 spectators was added for each of these games.
- It has also played host to the field hockey competition at the 2005 Canada Games among other notable sporting events over the decades.
- The stadium was the site of the four longest field goals in CFL history (note that Taylor Field was one of the most windy venues in the CFL due to the windy Saskatchewan climate and the structure of the stadium itself). Dave Cutler kicked a then-league-record 59-yard field goal on October 28, 1970 (and narrowly missed a 71-yard attempt at the stadium in 1977). Paul Watson tied that record with a 59-yarder against Winnipeg July 12, 1981. Dave Ridgway hit a 60-yarder against the Winnipeg Blue Bombers September 6, 1987 (it was the first time in CFL history that a field goal was made from that distance). That record was broken by Paul McCallum, who kicked a 62-yard field goal against the Edmonton Eskimos on October 27, 2001 in a 12–3 victory. Ridgway and Mark McLoughlin of the Calgary Stampeders have also kicked 58-yard field goals at Taylor Field.

=== Concerts ===
Date	Artist(s)	Opening act(s)	Tour	Tickets sold	Revenue	Additional notes
October 6, 2006	Rolling Stones	Three Days Grace	A Bigger Bang	—	$10,000,000+	Both shows sold out in less than an hour.
October 8, 2006	Rolling Stones	Three Days Grace	A Bigger Bang	—	$10,000,000+	Both shows sold out in less than an hour.
August 24, 2009	AC/DC	—	Black Ice World Tour	41,271 / 41,271	$3,531,449	Tickets sold out in less than an hour.
July 28, 2010	Bon Jovi	Kid Rock	The Circle Tour	33,070 / 33,070	$2,969,495	The live music video for This Is Our House was also filmed at the stadium.
August 14, 2013	Paul McCartney	—	Out There	38,750 / 38,750	$4,553,590	This was his first concert in the city. The City of Regina Pipe Band joined McCartney for "Mull of Kintyre".

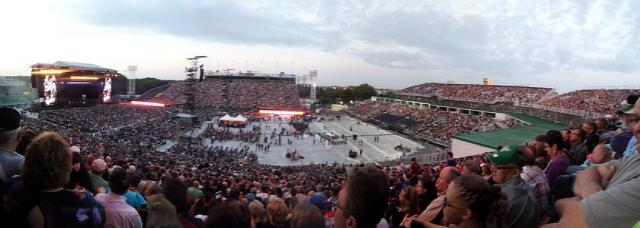
Paul McCartney performing at Mosaic Stadium in August 2013.

It was announced on May 4, 2009 that Aerosmith would be performing at Mosaic Stadium on August 9 as part of the Aerosmith/ZZ Top Tour. This concert, however, was cancelled due to the injuries that Steven Tyler sustained after falling off the stage in Sturgis, South Dakota.

== Replacement ==
On July 12, 2012 during a pre-game ceremony, Premier of Saskatchewan Brad Wall and Regina mayor Pat Fiacco announced that a new stadium would be constructed for the Roughriders at Regina's exhibition grounds.

Taylor Field hosted its final Roughriders game on October 29, 2016. The following week, it hosted its final football game, a Canada West conference semi-final with the Regina Rams. The Roughriders moved to the new Mosaic Stadium in the 2017 season.

In 2017, items from the former stadium were auctioned off in advance of its decommissioning and eventual demolition. Demolition began in September 2017; the tallest portion, and the last standing section of the structure, the west grandstand, was toppled on October 27, 2017.

== See also ==
- List of Canadian Football League stadiums
