= 1990 Winnipeg Blue Bombers season =

Canadian football team season

- General manager: Cal Murphy
- Head coach: Mike Riley
- Home stadium: Winnipeg Stadium

Results
- Record: 12–6
- Division place: 1st, East
- Playoffs: Won Grey Cup

The 1990 Winnipeg Blue Bombers season was the 33rd season for the team in the Canadian Football League (CFL) and their 58th overall. The Blue Bombers finished in first place in the East Division with a 12–6 record, which was also the best record in the league that year. The Blue Bombers defeated the Toronto Argonauts in the East Final and then defeated the Edmonton Eskimos in the championship game to win the 78th Grey Cup in the first ever Grey Cup match-up of prairie teams.

== Offseason ==
=== CFL draft ===
Round	Pick	Player	Position	School
2	11	Dave Boveil	CB/S	Colgate
3	19	Allan Boyko	WR	Western Michigan
5	35	Dave Vandersloot	OT	Henderson State
6	43	Steve Zatylny	WR	Bishop's
7	51	Lorne McCasin	DE/DT	North Dakota
8	59	Ray Wiens	OL	Saskatchewan

== Preseason ==
Game	Date	Opponent	Results		Venue	Attendance
Game	Date	Opponent	Score	Record	Venue	Attendance
A	Sun, June 24	at Saskatchewan Roughriders	W 41–40	1–0	Gordie Howe Bowl	4,000
B	Wed, June 27	at Calgary Stampeders	L 10–29	1–1	McMahon Stadium	23,233
C	Tue, July 3	vs. BC Lions	L 20–36	1–2	Winnipeg Stadium	32,111

== Regular season ==
=== Season standings ===
East Division
Pos	Team	Pld	W	L	T	PF	PA	PD	Pts	Div	Stk
1	Winnipeg Blue Bombers (C, Q)	18	12	6	0	472	398	74	24	7–3	W1
2	Toronto Argonauts (Q)	18	10	8	0	689	538	151	20	6–4	W1
3	Ottawa Rough Riders (Q)	18	7	11	0	540	602	−62	14	3–7	L1
4	Hamilton Tiger-Cats	18	6	12	0	476	628	−152	12	4–6	L3

Source: "CFL.ca - Official Site of the Canadian Football League". Archived from the original on 2009-12-15.
(C) First round bye; (Q) Qualified for playoffs

=== Season schedule ===
Week	Date	Opponent	Result	Record
1	July 12	at Ottawa Rough Riders	W 31–26	1–0
2	July 20	vs. Toronto Argonauts	W 34–17	2–0
3	July 27	at BC Lions	L 23–24	2–1
4	Aug 2	vs. Edmonton Eskimos	W 23–20	3–1
5	Aug 8	vs. BC Lions	W 28–14	4–1
6	Aug 15	at Hamilton Tiger-Cats	L 10–20	4–2
7	Aug 22	at Toronto Argonauts	W 27–24	5–2
8	Aug 28	vs. Calgary Stampeders	W 39–37	6–2
9	Sept 2	at Saskatchewan Roughriders	L 11–55	6–3
10	Sept 9	vs. Hamilton Tiger-Cats	W 29–18	7–3
11	Sept 14	at Calgary Stampeders	L 18–27	7–4
12	Sept 23	vs. Saskatchewan Roughriders	W 36–7	8–4
13	Sept 28	at Edmonton Eskimos	W 48–25	9–4
14	Oct 5	vs. Toronto Argonauts	W 25–9	10–4
15	Oct 13	at Toronto Argonauts	W 21–15	11–4
16	Oct 21	vs. Ottawa Rough Riders	L 20–27	11–5
17	Oct 28	at Ottawa Rough Riders	L 18–27	11–6
18	Nov 4	vs. Hamilton Tiger-Cats	W 32–15	12–6

== Playoffs ==
=== Schedule ===
Round	Date	Opponent	Result	Record
East Semi-final	Bye			
East Final	Nov 18	vs. Toronto Argonauts	W 20–17	1–0
Grey Cup	Nov 25	Edmonton Eskimos	W 50–11	2–0

=== East Final ===
Team	Q1	Q2	Q3	Q4	Total
Toronto Argonauts	3	0	7	7	17
Winnipeg Blue Bombers	3	6	0	11	20

=== Grey Cup ===
Team	Q1	Q2	Q3	Q4	Total
Winnipeg Blue Bombers	10	0	28	12	50
Edmonton Eskimos	0	4	0	7	11

== Roster ==
1990 Winnipeg Blue Bombers final roster
Quarterbacks: 13 Tom Burgess; 4 Danny McManus; Running backs: 37 Warren Hudson; 27 Robert Mimbs; 32 Matt Pearce; Receivers: 79 Rob Crifo; 31 Rick House; 74 Rodney Hughes; 71 Lee Hull; 21 James Murphy; 80 Eric Streater; 22 Perry Tuttle; 26 Ken Winey; 20 Steve Zatylny	Offensive linemen: 59 Lyle Bauer C; 68 Nick Benjamin G; 51 David Black T/G; 64 Bob Molle G; 69 Scott Redl T/C; 57 Steve Rodehutskors T; 63 Chris Walby T; Defensive linemen: 99 Jeff Croonen DE; 52 Mike Gray DE; 44 Leon Hatziioannou NT; 75 Stan Mikawos NT; 55 Jerome Rinehart DE; 43 Quency Williams DE; Special teams: 6 Bob Cameron P; 3 Trevor Kennerd K	Linebackers: 34 Greg Battle; 35 Tyrone Jones; 36 Paul Randolph; 76 Quentin Riggins; 70 David Ward; 58 James West; 72 Albert Williams; Defensive backs: 33 Michael Allen; 29 Dave Bovell; 15 Less Browne; 7 Burt Cummings; 12 Bobby Evans; 24 Ken Hailey; 10 Rod Hill; 8 Ken Pettway; 30 Darryl Sampson; Italics indicate International player

== Awards and records ==
- CFL's Most Outstanding Defensive Player Award – Greg Battle (LB)
- CFL's Coach of the Year – Mike Riley

=== 1990 CFL All-Stars ===
- RB – Robert Mimbs
- OT – Chris Walby
- LB – Greg Battle
- CB – Less Browne
- CB – Rod Hill
- P – Bob Cameron
