= 1990 Edmonton Eskimos season =

Canadian football season

- General manager: Hugh Campbell
- Head coach: Joe Faragalli
- Home stadium: Commonwealth Stadium

Results
- Record: 10–8
- Division place: 2nd, West
- Playoffs: Lost Grey Cup

The 1990 Edmonton Eskimos finished in second place in the West Division with a 10–8 record. The club attempted to win their 11th Grey Cup championship, but lost the Grey Cup game 50-11 to the Winnipeg Blue Bombers.

== Offseason ==
=== CFL draft ===
#	Player	Pos	College
1	Sean Millington	RB	Simon Fraser
6	Steve Christie	P/K	William and Mary
14	Bob MacDonald	OT/LS	McMaster
22	Lance Trumble	FB/DE	McMaster
30	Gord Steeves	DB	Manitoba
38	Jordan Gaertner	WR	Saskatchewan
46	Chris Porter	RB	Windsor
54	Maki Katsube	SB/RB	St. Francis Xavier
62	Ron Webert	P/K	Washington State

== Preseason ==
Week	Date	Opponent	Results		Venue	Attendance
Week	Date	Opponent	Score	Record	Venue	Attendance
A	June 28	at BC Lions	L 24–23	0–1		
B	July 3	vs Saskatchewan Roughriders	W 35–23	1–1		

== Regular season ==
=== Season standings ===
West Division
Pos	Team	Pld	W	L	T	PF	PA	PD	Pts
1	Calgary Stampeders (C, Q)	18	11	6	1	588	566	+22	23
2	Edmonton Eskimos (Q)	18	10	8	0	612	510	+102	20
3	Saskatchewan Roughriders (Q)	18	9	9	0	557	592	−35	18
4	BC Lions	18	6	11	1	520	620	−100	13

Source: "CFL.ca - Official Site of the Canadian Football League". Archived from the original on 2009-12-15.
(C) First round bye; (Q) Qualified for playoffs

=== Season schedule ===
Game	Date	Opponent	Results		Venue	Attendance
Game	Date	Opponent	Score	Record	Venue	Attendance
1	July 14	at Toronto Argonauts	W 40–34	1–0		
2	July 18	vs. BC Lions	W 41–23	2–0		
3	July 26	at Ottawa Rough Riders	L 46–50	2–1		
4	Aug 2	at Winnipeg Blue Bombers	L 20–23	2–2		
5	Aug 7	vs. Saskatchewan Roughriders	W 57–31	3–2		
6	Aug 14	vs. Calgary Stampeders	W 46–20	4–2		
7	Aug 19	at Saskatchewan Roughriders	L 24–49	4–3		
8	Aug 27	vs. Toronto Argonauts	W 56–36	5–3		
9	Sept 3	at Calgary Stampeders	W 38–4	6–3		
10	Sept 7	vs. Calgary Stampeders	W 34–17	7–3		
11	Sept 13	at BC Lions	W 32–13	8–3		
12	Sept 21	vs Ottawa Rough Riders	W 41–29	9–3		
13	Sept 28	vs. Winnipeg Blue Bombers	L 25–48	9–4		
14	Oct 8	at Hamilton Tiger-Cats	L 23–25	9–5		
15	Oct 14	at Saskatchewan Roughriders	L 24–29	9–6		
16	Oct 21	vs. BC Lions	L 8–30	9–7		
17	Oct 28	vs. Hamilton Tiger-Cats	W 25–15	10–7		
18	Nov 4	at Calgary Stampeders	L 32–34	10–8		

== Postseason ==
=== Schedule ===
Round	Date	Opponent	Results		Venue	Attendance
Round	Date	Opponent	Score	Record	Venue	Attendance
West Semi-Final	Nov 11	vs. Saskatchewan Roughriders	W 43–27	1–0		
West Final	Nov 18	at Calgary Stampeders	W 43–23	2–0		
Grey Cup	Nov 25	vs. Winnipeg Blue Bombers	L 11–50	2–1		

=== West Semi-Final ===
Team	Q1	Q2	Q3	Q4	Total
Saskatchewan Roughriders	10	7	10	0	27
Edmonton Eskimos	14	7	14	8	43

=== West Final ===
Team	Q1	Q2	Q3	Q4	Total
Edmonton Eskimos	3	10	24	6	43
Calgary Stampeders	6	6	3	8	23

=== Grey Cup ===
Main article: 78th Grey Cup

Team	Q1	Q2	Q3	Q4	Total
Winnipeg Blue Bombers	10	0	28	12	50
Edmonton Eskimos	0	4	0	7	11

== Roster ==
1990 Edmonton Eskimos final roster
Quarterbacks: 8 Tracy Ham; 6 Warren Jones; 10 Steve Taylor; Running backs: 83 Chris Johnstone; 22 Blake Marshall; 32 Michael Soles; 26 Reggie Taylor; 34 Brian Walling; Receivers: 27 Marco Cyncar K; 33 Craig Ellis; 31 Jordan Gaertner; 25 Tom Richards; 81 Todd Smith; 2 Gizmo Williams; 71 Keith Wright	Offensive linemen: 57 Randy Ambrosie G; 66 Trevor Bowles T; 67 Rod Connop C; 50 Blake Dermott T; 53 Mike Dumaresq G/C; 55 Andrew McConnell G/C; 60 Todd Storme T; 54 Pierre Vercheval G; Defensive linemen: 94 Michel Bourgeau DT; 96 Rob Davidson DE/DT; 40 Bennie Goods DE; 36 Stewart Hill DE; 61 Mike Walker DT; 91 Brett Williams DE/DT	Linebackers: 30 Danny Bass; 89 Leroy Blugh; 44 Jeff Braswell; 45 Mike McLean; 43 Jed Roberts; 47 Larry Wruck; Defensive backs: 14 Andre Francis; 18 Keith Gooch; 29 Enis Jackson; 9 Jim Jauch; 13 Mark Mathis; 23 Mark Norman; 19 David Shelton; Special teams: 4 Ray Macoritti K/P; Italics indicate American player
