= J. P. Izquierdo =

Canadian football player (born 1969)

No. 15, 23
- Positions: Slotback, Running back

Personal information
- Born: March 12, 1969 (age 57); Calgary, Alberta, Canada
- Listed height: 5 ft 11 in (1.80 m)
- Listed weight: 195 lb (88 kg)

Career information
- High school: Saint Francis (Calgary)
- University: Calgary
- CFL draft: 1991: 2nd round, 10th overall pick

Career history
- 1991–1992: Toronto Argonauts
- 1993–1995: Edmonton Eskimos
- 1996: Toronto Argonauts
- 1997: Calgary Stampeders

Awards and highlights
- 3× Grey Cup champion (1991, 1993, 1996)

Jean Paul Izquierdo (born March 12, 1969) is a Canadian former professional football slotback who played seven seasons in the Canadian Football League (CFL) with the Toronto Argonauts, Edmonton Eskimos and Calgary Stampeders. He was drafted by the Toronto Argonauts in the second round of the 1991 CFL draft. He played CIS football at the University of Calgary. He is the older brother of former CFL player Javier Glatt.

== Early life ==
Jean Paul Izquierdo was born on March 12, 1969, in Calgary. He attended Saint Francis High School in Calgary.

== College career ==
Izquierdo played CIS football for the Calgary Dinos, setting the school record for total touchdowns with 29. He also recorded 2,505 rushing yards on 434 attempts. He helped the Dinos win the 24th Vanier Cup in 1988, was a first team All-Canadian in 1989 and was on the second national all-star team in 1990.

== Professional career ==
Izquierdo was selected by the Toronto Argonauts with the tenth pick in the 1991 CFL draft. He played for the Argonauts from 1991 to 1992, winning the 79th Grey Cup in 1991. On January 28, 1993, Izquierdo, Rickey Foggie, Darrell K. Smith, Ed Berry, Eddie Brown, Leonard Johnson, Don Wilson, and Bruce Dickson, were traded to the Edmonton Eskimos for Tracy Ham, Enis Jackson, Ken Winey, Travis Oliver, Craig Ellis, Chris Johnstone, John Davis, and the rights to Cam Brosseau. Izquierdo played for the Eskimos from 1993 to 1995, winning the 81st Grey Cup in 1993. Izquierdo played for the Argonauts in 1996, winning the 84th Grey Cup. He played for the Calgary Stampeders in 1997.

== Personal life ==
Izquierdo later became a teacher at his alma mater Saint Francis High School.
