= List of Ottawa Redblacks starting quarterbacks =

The following is an incomplete list of starting quarterbacks that have started a regular season or post-season game for the Ottawa Redblacks franchise of the Canadian Football League (CFL). They are listed in order of appearance during the regular season or post-season, since 2002. Prior years list number of starts from greatest to fewest.

As defined in the 2016 CFL's Facts, Figures, and Records and the 2023 CFL Guide & Record Book, for historical record purposes and by the current Ottawa Redblacks' request, the Ottawa Football Clubs are considered to be a single entity since 1876 with two periods of inactivity (1997–2001 and 2006–2013). Consequently, this list includes figures from the Ottawa Football Club (1876–1898), Ottawa Rough Riders (1899–1919, 1931–1996), Ottawa Senators (1920–1930), Ottawa Renegades (2002–2005), and Ottawa Redblacks (2014–present).

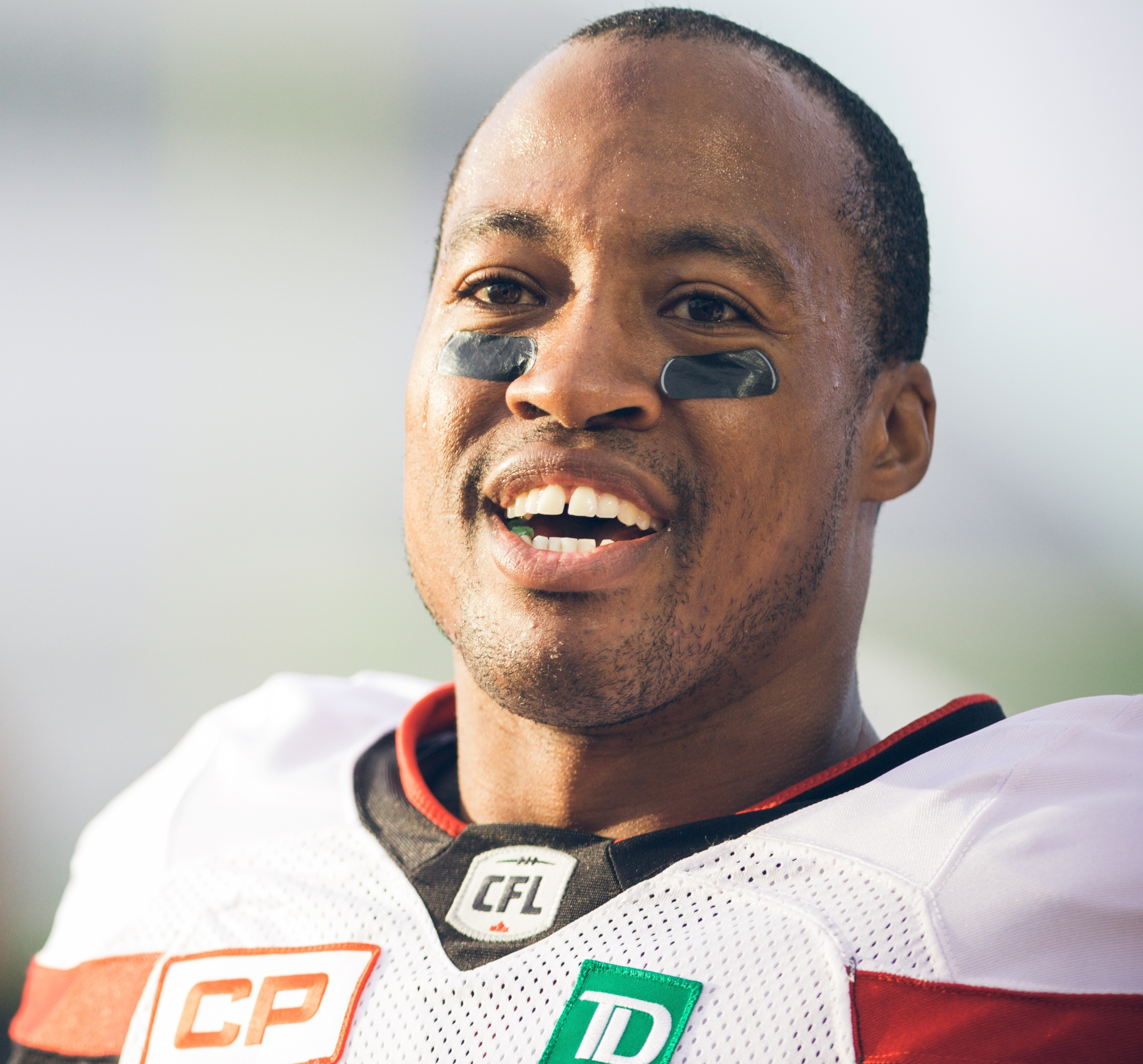
Henry Burris won the 104th Grey Cup as Ottawa's starting quarterback and holds franchise single-season records for passing yards and completions.

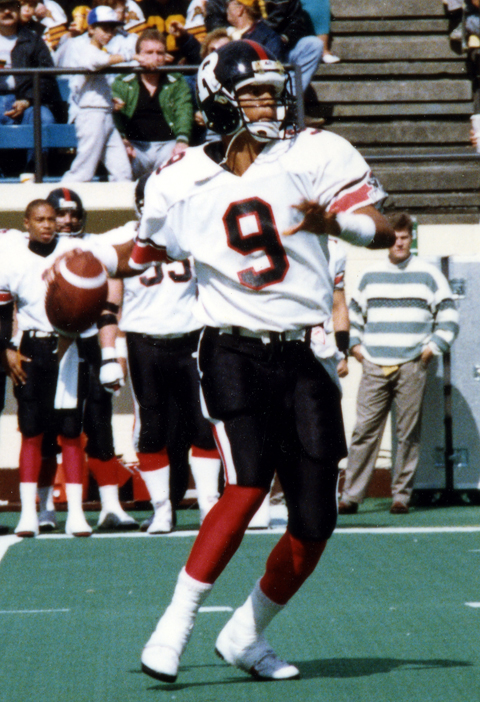
Damon Allen has the most single-season passing touchdowns in franchise history.

== Regular season ==
The number of games they started during the season is listed to the right:

Season(s)	Regular season	Postseason
2026	Jake Maier (12) / McLeod Bethel-Thompson (4) / Bryson Barnes (2)	
2025	Dru Brown (9) / Matthew Shiltz (1) / Dustin Crum (6) / Tyrie Adams (2)	
2024	Dru Brown (15) / Jeremiah Masoli (3)	Dru Brown (1)
2023	Nick Arbuckle (2) / Tyrie Adams (1) / Jeremiah Masoli (1) / Dustin Crum (14)	
2022	Jeremiah Masoli (4) / Caleb Evans (6) / Nick Arbuckle (8)	
2021	Matt Nichols (4) / Dominique Davis (2) / Caleb Evans (7) / Devlin Hodges (1)	
2020	Season cancelled due to COVID-19 pandemic	
2019	Dominique Davis (9) / Jonathon Jennings (6) / William Arndt (3)	
2018	Trevor Harris (17) / Dominique Davis (1)	Trevor Harris (2)
2017	Trevor Harris (15) / Drew Tate (1) / Ryan Lindley (2)	Trevor Harris (1)
2016	Henry Burris (7) / Trevor Harris (10) / Brock Jensen (1)	Henry Burris (2)
2015	Henry Burris (18)	Henry Burris (2)
2014	Henry Burris (18)	
2006–2013	Suspended operations	
2005	Kerry Joseph (18)	
2004	Kerry Joseph (12) / Darnell Kennedy (4) / Brad Banks (2)	
2003	Dan Crowley (3) / Kerry Joseph (14) / Romaro Miller (1)	
2002	Dan Crowley (13) / Chuck Clements (4) / Oteman Sampson (1)	
1997–2001	Suspended operations	
1996	David Archer (16) / Steve Taylor (2)	
1995	Sammy Garza (6) / Danny Barrett (4) / Andre Ware (4) / Jay Macias (3) / Shawn Moore (1)	
1994	Danny Barrett (16) / Marquel Fleetwood (2)	Danny Barrett (1)
1993	Tom Burgess (17) / Terrence Jones (1)	Tom Burgess (1)
1992	Tom Burgess (17) / Terrence Jones (1)	Tom Burgess (1)
1991	Damon Allen (18)	Damon Allen (1)
1990	Damon Allen (17) / Ken Hobart (1)	Damon Allen (1)
1989	Damon Allen (12) / Tony Kimbrough (4) / Ken Hobart (2)	
1988	Todd Dillon (7) / Jeff Wickersham (6) / Roy Dewalt (3) / Art Schlichter (2)	
1987	Todd Dillon (11) / Joe Paopao (7)	
1986	Tom Burgess (6) / Todd Dillon (4) / Gilbert Renfroe (4) / J.C. Watts (4)	

== Team passer rankings ==
Quarterbacks are listed by number of starts for Ottawa Football Clubs.

Name	GS	W–L–T	Comp	Att	Pct	Yards	TD	Int
Russ Jackson	137	85–47–5	1,356	2,530	53.6	24,593	185	124
Tom Clements	53	31–20–2	674	1,116	60.4	9,663	66	54
J. C. Watts	52	22–30–0	743	1,426	52.1	10,937	61	88
Damon Allen	47	16–31–0	767	1,508	50.9	11,251	75	70
Kerry Joseph	44	17–27–0	803	1,329	60.4	10,922	57	53
Henry Burris	43	18–25–0	976	1,459	66.9	11,840	49	36
Trevor Harris	42	21–19–2	1,071	1,571	70.6	13,096	68	26
Tom Burgess	39	14–24–1	700	1,301	53.8	10,288	64	61
Condredge Holloway	32	15–15–2	547	997	54.9	8,363	38	56
Rick Cassata	32	20–12–0	438	925	47.4	6,157	55	28
