= Chris Johnstone (Canadian football) =

American football player (born 1963)

No. 83, 25
- Position: Fullback

Personal information
- Born: December 12, 1963 (age 62); Kingston, Jamaica
- Listed height: 6 ft 3 in (1.91 m)
- Listed weight: 215 lb (98 kg)

Career information
- NFL draft: 1986: undrafted

Career history
- Edmonton Eskimos (1986–1992); Toronto Argonauts (1993)*; Winnipeg Blue Bombers (1993–1995)
- * Offseason or practice squad member only

Awards and highlights
- Grey Cup champion (1987); CFL East All-Star (1993)

Chris Johnstone (born December 12, 1963) is a Jamaican-Canadian former professional football fullback who played ten seasons in the Canadian Football League (CFL) for the Edmonton Eskimos and Winnipeg Blue Bombers. He played college football at Bakersfield College.

== Early life and college ==
Chris Johnstone was born on December 12, 1963, in Kingston, Jamaica. He moved to Canada and grew up in Edmonton. He played for the Edmonton Wildcats of the Canadian Junior Football League and helped them win the national title in 1983.

Johnstone played college football at Bakersfield College. He was later recruited by several major U.S. universities, but instead decided to turn pro.

== Professional career ==
Johnstone signed with the Edmonton Eskimos of the Canadian Football League (CFL) in June 1986. On November 29, 1987, the Eskimos won the 75th Grey Cup against the Toronto Argonauts by a score of 38–36. In 1990, it was reported that Johnstone was being traded to the BC Lions for Larry Ray Willis but the trade was cancelled at the last second. Johnstone dressed in 102 games for the Eskimos from 1986 to 1992.

On January 28, 1993, Johnstone, Tracy Ham, Enis Jackson, Ken Winey, Travis Oliver, Craig Ellis, John Davis, and the rights to Cam Brosseau were traded to the Toronto Argonauts for Rickey Foggie, Darrell K. Smith, Ed Berry, Eddie Brown, Leonard Johnson, Don Wilson, Bruce Dickson, and J. P. Izquierdo. The 16-player deal is the biggest trade in CFL history. On June 2, 1993, it was reported that Johnstone had been traded to the Winnipeg Blue Bombers for fullback Warren Hudson. Johnstone was named a CFL East All Star in 1993. He dressed in all 54 games for the Blue Bombers from 1993 to 1995.

Johnstone retired from the CFL in May 1996, citing a combination of weak knees, wanting to be with his family, and a $20 per hour machine operating job at a sawmill in Hinton, Alberta. He was mostly a short-yardage specialist and blocking fullback during his CFL career, rushing 415 times for 1,678 yards and 22 touchdowns. He also caught 110 career passes for 1,069 yards and five touchdowns. Johnstone posted 22 special teams tackles in 1992 as well.
