= 1990 Calgary Stampeders season =

Canadian football team season

- Owner: Community Ownership
- General manager: Norman Kwong
- President: Norman Kwong
- Head coach: Wally Buono
- Home stadium: McMahon Stadium

Results
- Record: 11–6–1
- Division place: 1st, West
- Playoffs: Lost West Final

The 1990 Calgary Stampeders finished in first place in the West Division with an 11–6–1 record.

Calgary clinched first place on November 4 when they beat the Edmonton Eskimos in a winner-takes-first showdown. This was the first time Calgary finished first place since 1971.

1990 was the first of thirteen seasons with Wally Buono as the team's head coach, and the first of eleven seasons in which Allen Pitts was a Calgary receiver.

Calgary was defeated in the West Final by Edmonton 43–23.

== Offseason ==
=== CFL draft ===
Rd	Pick	Player	Position	School
1	5	Dave Sapunjis	SB	Western Ontario
2	13	Mark Singer	LB/FB	Alberta
3	18	Pat Hinds	T/G	San Jose State
4	27	Derek Sang	T	San Diego State
4	29	Richard Chen	HB/PR	Waterloo
5	37	Rob Godley	FS/FR	Western Ontario
6	45	Kevin Kazan	WR/K	Calgary
7	53	Randy Power	LB	Mount Allison
8	61	Sean Furlong	WR	Calgary

== Preseason ==
Round	Date	Opponent	Results		Venue	Attendance
Round	Date	Opponent	Score	Record	Venue	Attendance
A	Wed, June 22	vs. Winnipeg Blue Bombers	W 29–10	1–0	McMahon Stadium	23,233
B	Tue, July 3	at Hamilton Tiger-Cats	L 27–28	1–1	Ivor Wynne Stadium	10,136

== Regular season ==
=== Season standings ===
West Division
Pos	Team	Pld	W	L	T	PF	PA	PD	Pts
1	Calgary Stampeders (C, Q)	18	11	6	1	588	566	+22	23
2	Edmonton Eskimos (Q)	18	10	8	0	612	510	+102	20
3	Saskatchewan Roughriders (Q)	18	9	9	0	557	592	−35	18
4	BC Lions	18	6	11	1	520	620	−100	13

Source: "CFL.ca - Official Site of the Canadian Football League". Archived from the original on 2009-12-15.
(C) First round bye; (Q) Qualified for playoffs

=== Season schedule ===
Week	Game	Date	Opponent	Results		Venue	Attendance
Week	Game	Date	Opponent	Score	Record	Venue	Attendance
1	1	Fri, July 13	at BC Lions	T 38–38	0–0–1	BC Place	34,233
2	2	Thurs, July 19	vs. Saskatchewan Roughriders	W 30–25	1–0–1	McMahon Stadium	24,818
3	3	Fri, July 27	at Saskatchewan Roughriders	W 54–16	2–0–1	Taylor Field	26,713
4	4	Fri, Aug 3	vs. Hamilton Tiger-Cats	W 40–35	3–0–1	McMahon Stadium	23,667
5	5	Thurs, Aug 9	vs. Toronto Argonauts	W 42–17	4–0–1	McMahon Stadium	22,241
6	6	Tue, Aug 14	at Edmonton Eskimos	L 20–46	4–1–1	Commonwealth Stadium	35,104
7	7	Wed, Aug 22	vs. Ottawa Rough Riders	W 34–31	5–1–1	McMahon Stadium	20,311
8	8	Wed, Aug 28	at Winnipeg Blue Bombers	L 37–39 (OT)	5–2–1	Winnipeg Stadium	28,480
8	9	Mon, Sept 3	vs. Edmonton Eskimos	L 4–38	5–3–1	McMahon Stadium	36,107
9	10	Fri, Sept 7	at Edmonton Eskimos	L 17–34	5–4–1	Commonwealth Stadium	57,444
10	11	Fri, Sept 14	vs. Winnipeg Blue Bombers	W 18–17	6–4–1	McMahon Stadium	22,588
11	12	Thurs, Sept 20	at Toronto Argonauts	L 18–70	6–5–1	SkyDome	27,868
12	13	Sun, Sept 30	at Ottawa Rough Riders	W 52–8	7–5–1	Lansdowne Park	20,035
13	14	Sun, Oct 7	vs. Saskatchewan Roughriders	W 23–16	8–5–1	McMahon Stadium	27,964
14	15	Sun, Oct 14	vs. BC Lions	L 25–33	8–6–1	McMahon Stadium	18,154
15	16	Sun, Oct 21	at Hamilton Tiger-Cats	W 48–42	9–6–1	Ivor Wynne Stadium	20,076
16	17	Sat, Oct 27	at BC Lions	W 54–29	10–6–1	BC Place	29,536
17	18	Sun, Nov 4	vs. Edmonton Eskimos	W 34–32	11–6–1	McMahon Stadium	26,676

== Playoffs ==
=== West Final ===
Team	Q1	Q2	Q3	Q4	Total
Edmonton Eskimos	3	10	24	6	43
Calgary Stampeders	6	6	3	8	23

== Roster ==
1990 Calgary Stampeders final roster
Quarterbacks: 8 Danny Barrett; 9 Terrence Jones; Running backs: 10 Tony Cherry; 23 Keyvan Jenkins; 34 Andy McVey; 12 Tim Petros; 27 Tony Spoletini; Receivers: 88 Shawn Beals; 83 Derrick Crawford; 18 Allen Pitts; 25 Dave Sapunjis; 86 Demetrius Smith; 76 Marshall Toner	Offensive linemen: 59 Leo Blanchard G; 56 Doug Davies G/C; 62 Lloyd Fairbanks T; 52 Brian Hutchings G/T; 65 Mike Palumbo C; 50 Kevin Powell T; 61 Tom Spoletini G; Defensive linemen: 79 Walter Ballard DE; 95 Harald Hasselbach DE; 81 Will Johnson DE; 75 Stu Laird DT; 74 Mitchell Price DT; 93 Kent Warnock DT; 96 Srecko Zizakovic DE	Linebackers: 60 Joe Clausi; 37 Matt Finlay; 44 Mark Singer; 92 Henry Smith; 35 Dan Wicklum; Defensive backs: 14 Moustafa Ali; 19 Karl Anthony; 29 Paul Clatney; 7 Darryl Hall; 15 Ron Hopkins; 32 Darcy Kopp; 3 David McCrary; 24 Greg Peterson; 2 Junior Thurman	Special teams: 4 Brent Matich P; 13 Mark McLoughlin K; Injured list: 69 Lou Cafazzo T; Italics indicate International player
