= 1990 CFL season =

Canadian Football League season

- Duration: July 12 – November 4, 1990
- East champions: Winnipeg Blue Bombers
- West champions: Edmonton Eskimos

78th Grey Cup
- Date: November 25, 1990
- Venue: BC Place Stadium, Vancouver
- Champions: Winnipeg Blue Bombers

CFL seasons
- ← 1989 1991 →

Canadian Football League team locations: West, East

The 1990 CFL season is considered to be the 37th season in modern-day Canadian football, although it is officially the 33rd Canadian Football League season.

== CFL news in 1990 ==
J. Donald Crump was appointed as the eighth CFL Commissioner on Friday, January 5.

The CFL Annual Meetings-Canadian College Draft was held in Hamilton for the third straight year.

The CFL increased roster limit to 37 players to include 20 non-imports, 14 imports and 3 quarterbacks with the reserve list remaining at two players.

The Toronto Argonauts and the BC Lions set a record for most points in a game when they scored 111 points on Saturday, September 1 at the SkyDome. The Argonauts won the game 68–43.

The BC Lions added silver to its team colour scheme. In addition, Vancouver played host to the Grey Cup game for the 11th time, and for the fourth time at BC Place.

Citing multi-million dollar losses, the league-run Canadian Football Network syndication service ceased operations after this season; it had replaced CTV's CFL coverage in 1987.

== Regular season standings ==
=== Final regular season standings ===
West Division
Pos	Team	Pld	W	L	T	PF	PA	PD	Pts
1	Calgary Stampeders (C, Q)	18	11	6	1	588	566	+22	23
2	Edmonton Eskimos (Q)	18	10	8	0	612	510	+102	20
3	Saskatchewan Roughriders (Q)	18	9	9	0	557	592	−35	18
4	BC Lions	18	6	11	1	520	620	−100	13

Source: "CFL.ca - Official Site of the Canadian Football League". Archived from the original on December 15, 2009.
(C) First round bye; (Q) Qualified for playoffs

East Division
Pos	Team	Pld	W	L	T	PF	PA	PD	Pts	Div	Stk
1	Winnipeg Blue Bombers (C, Q)	18	12	6	0	472	398	74	24	7–3	W1
2	Toronto Argonauts (Q)	18	10	8	0	689	538	151	20	6–4	W1
3	Ottawa Rough Riders (Q)	18	7	11	0	540	602	−62	14	3–7	L1
4	Hamilton Tiger-Cats	18	6	12	0	476	628	−152	12	4–6	L3

Source: "CFL.ca - Official Site of the Canadian Football League". Archived from the original on December 15, 2009.
(C) First round bye; (Q) Qualified for playoffs

Calgary and Winnipeg had first round byes.

== Grey Cup playoffs ==
The Winnipeg Blue Bombers are the 1990 Grey Cup champions, humiliating the Edmonton Eskimos 50–11, at Vancouver's BC Place Stadium. The Blue Bombers' Tom Burgess (QB) was named the Grey Cup's Most Valuable Player on Offence and Greg Battle (LB) was named Grey Cup's Most Valuable Player on Defence, while Warren Hudson (FB) was named the Grey Cup's Most Valuable Canadian.

=== Playoff bracket ===
November 11: Division Semifinals
East
E3	Ottawa Rough Riders	25
E2	Toronto Argonauts	34
West
W3	Saskatchewan Roughriders	27
W2	Edmonton Eskimos	43

November 18: Division Finals
E2	Toronto Argonauts	17
E1	Winnipeg Blue Bombers	20
W2	Edmonton Eskimos	43
W1	Calgary Stampeders	23

November 25: 78th Grey Cup @ BC Place Stadium – Vancouver, BC
E1	Winnipeg Blue Bombers	50
W2	Edmonton Eskimos	11

== CFL leaders ==
- CFL passing leaders
- CFL rushing leaders
- CFL receiving leaders

== 1990 CFL All-Stars ==
=== Offence ===
- QB – Kent Austin, Saskatchewan Roughriders
- FB – Blake Marshall, Edmonton Eskimos
- RB – Robert Mimbs, Winnipeg Blue Bombers
- SB – Darrell Smith, Toronto Argonauts
- SB – Craig Ellis, Edmonton Eskimos
- WR – Stephen Jones, Ottawa Rough Riders
- WR – Don Narcisse, Saskatchewan Roughriders
- C – Rod Connop, Edmonton Eskimos
- OG – Dan Ferrone, Toronto Argonauts
- OG – Roger Aldag, Saskatchewan Roughriders
- OT – Jim Mills, BC Lions
- OT – Chris Walby, Winnipeg Blue Bombers

=== Defence ===
- DT – Kent Warnock, Calgary Stampeders
- DT – Harold Hallman, Toronto Argonauts
- DE – Stewart Hill, Edmonton Eskimos
- DE – Greg Stumon, Ottawa Rough Riders
- LB – Danny Bass, Edmonton Eskimos
- LB – Willie Pless, BC Lions
- LB – Greg Battle, Winnipeg Blue Bombers
- CB – Less Browne, Winnipeg Blue Bombers
- CB – Rod Hill, Winnipeg Blue Bombers
- DB – Troy Wilson, Ottawa Rough Riders
- DB – Don Wilson, Toronto Argonauts
- DS – Greg Peterson, Calgary Stampeders

=== Special teams ===
- P – Bob Cameron, Winnipeg Blue Bombers
- K – Dave Ridgway, Saskatchewan Roughriders
- ST – Mike "Pinball" Clemons, Toronto Argonauts

== 1990 Eastern All-Stars ==
=== Offence ===
- QB – Tom Burgess, Winnipeg Blue Bombers
- FB – Warren Hudson, Winnipeg Blue Bombers
- RB – Robert Mimbs, Winnipeg Blue Bombers
- SB – Darrell Smith, Toronto Argonauts
- SB – Rick House, Winnipeg Blue Bombers
- WR – Stephen Jones, Ottawa Rough Riders
- WR – Earl Winfield, Hamilton Tiger-Cats
- C – Lyle Bauer, Winnipeg Blue Bombers
- OG – Dan Ferrone, Toronto Argonauts
- OG – Gerald Roper, Ottawa Rough Riders
- OT – Rob Smith, Ottawa Rough Riders
- OT – Chris Walby, Winnipeg Blue Bombers

=== Defence ===
- DT – Lloyd Lewis, Ottawa Rough Riders
- DT – Harold Hallman, Toronto Argonauts
- DE – Grover Covington, Hamilton Tiger-Cats
- DE – Greg Stumon, Ottawa Rough Riders
- LB – Tyrone Jones, Winnipeg Blue Bombers
- LB – Bruce Holmes, Ottawa Rough Riders
- LB – Greg Battle, Winnipeg Blue Bombers
- CB – Less Browne, Winnipeg Blue Bombers
- CB – Rod Hill, Winnipeg Blue Bombers
- DB – Troy Wilson, Ottawa Rough Riders
- DB – Don Wilson, Toronto Argonauts
- S – Scott Flagel, Ottawa Rough Riders

=== Special teams ===
- P – Bob Cameron, Winnipeg Blue Bombers
- K – Paul Osbaldiston, Hamilton Tiger-Cats
- ST – Mike "Pinball" Clemons, Toronto Argonauts

== 1990 Western All-Stars ==
=== Offence ===
- QB – Kent Austin, Saskatchewan Roughriders
- FB – Blake Marshall, Edmonton Eskimos
- RB – Reggie Taylor, Edmonton Eskimos
- SB – Ray Elgaard, Saskatchewan Roughriders
- SB – Craig Ellis, Edmonton Eskimos
- WR – Ray Alexander, BC Lions
- WR – Don Narcisse, Saskatchewan Roughriders
- C – Rod Connop, Edmonton Eskimos
- OG – Leo Blanchard, Calgary Stampeders
- OG – Roger Aldag, Saskatchewan Roughriders
- OT – Jim Mills, BC Lions
- OT – Lloyd Fairbanks, Calgary Stampeders

=== Defence ===
- DT – Kent Warnock, Calgary Stampeders
- DT – Brett Williams, Edmonton Eskimos
- DE – Stewart Hill, Edmonton Eskimos
- DE – Will Johnson, Calgary Stampeders
- LB – Danny Bass, Edmonton Eskimos
- LB – Willie Pless, BC Lions
- LB – Dan Rashovich, Saskatchewan Roughriders
- CB – Andre Francis, Edmonton Eskimos
- CB – Keith Gooch, Edmonton Eskimos
- DB – Richie Hall, Saskatchewan Roughriders
- DB – David McCrary, Calgary Stampeders
- DS – Greg Peterson, Calgary Stampeders

=== Special teams ===
- P – Brent Matich, Calgary Stampeders
- K – Dave Ridgway, Saskatchewan Roughriders
- ST – Derrick Crawford, Calgary Stampeders

== 1990 CFL awards ==
- CFL's Most Outstanding Player Award – Mike "Pinball" Clemons (RB), Toronto Argonauts
- CFL's Most Outstanding Canadian Award – Ray Elgaard (SB), Saskatchewan Roughriders
- CFL's Most Outstanding Defensive Player Award – Greg Battle (LB), Winnipeg Blue Bombers
- CFL's Most Outstanding Offensive Lineman Award – Jim Mills (OT), BC Lions
- CFL's Most Outstanding Rookie Award – Reggie Barnes (RB), Ottawa Rough Riders
- CFLPA's Outstanding Community Service Award – Richie Hall (DB), Saskatchewan Roughriders
- CFL's Coach of the Year – Mike Riley, Winnipeg Blue Bombers
- Commissioner's Award - Gregory B. Fulton, Toronto
