= 1990 Toronto Argonauts season =

CFL team season

- Head coach: Don Matthews
- Home stadium: SkyDome

Results
- Record: 10–8
- Division place: 2nd, East
- Playoffs: Lost East Final

Uniform

In the 1990 CFL season, the Toronto Argonauts finished in second place in the East Division with a 10–8 record. They appeared in the Eastern Final. After being the CFL's passing leader (331 completions 597 attempts for 4,509 yards) in 1989 Matt Dunigan was in another blockbuster six-for-one player trade that sent him to the Argonauts. During Dunigan's first season with the Argonauts, he helped guide the second most prolific scoring offense in the history of the Canadian Football League to 689 points or 38.3 points per contest.

== Regular season ==
=== Standings ===
East Division
Pos	Team	Pld	W	L	T	PF	PA	PD	Pts	Div	Stk
1	Winnipeg Blue Bombers (C, Q)	18	12	6	0	472	398	74	24	7–3	W1
2	Toronto Argonauts (Q)	18	10	8	0	689	538	151	20	6–4	W1
3	Ottawa Rough Riders (Q)	18	7	11	0	540	602	−62	14	3–7	L1
4	Hamilton Tiger-Cats	18	6	12	0	476	628	−152	12	4–6	L3

Source: "CFL.ca - Official Site of the Canadian Football League". Archived from the original on 2009-12-15.
(C) First round bye; (Q) Qualified for playoffs

=== Schedule ===
Week	Game	Date	Opponent	Results		Venue	Attendance
Week	Game	Date	Opponent	Score	Record	Venue	Attendance
1	1	July 14	vs. Edmonton Eskimos	L 34–40	0–1	SkyDome	26,815
2	2	July 20	at Winnipeg Blue Bombers	L 17–34	0–2	Winnipeg Stadium	25,691
3	3	July 28	at Hamilton Tiger-Cats	W 41–29	1–2	Ivor Wynne Stadium	20,387
4	4	Aug 4	vs. Ottawa Rough Riders	W 30–26	2–2	SkyDome	28,333
5	5	Aug 9	at Calgary Stampeders	L 17–42	2–3	McMahon Stadium	22,241
6	6	Aug 16	at Ottawa Rough Riders	W 41–25	3–3	Lansdowne Park	27,591
7	7	Aug 22	vs. Winnipeg Blue Bombers	L 23–27	3–4	SkyDome	30,249
7	8	Aug 27	at Edmonton Eskimos	L 36–56	3–5	Commonwealth Stadium	28,151
8	9	Sept 1	vs. BC Lions	W 68–43	4–5	SkyDome	31,003
9	10	Sept 6	at BC Lions	W 49–19	5–5	BC Place	36,330
10	11	Sept 15	at Hamilton Tiger-Cats	W 39–16	6–5	Ivor Wynne Stadium	14,025
11	12	Sept 20	vs. Calgary Stampeders	W 70–18	7–5	SkyDome	27,868
12	13	Sept 29	vs. Hamilton Tiger-Cats	W 60–39	8–5	SkyDome	30,793
13	14	Oct 5	at Winnipeg Blue Bombers	L 9–25	8–6	Winnipeg Stadium	30,484
14	15	Oct 13	vs. Winnipeg Blue Bombers	L 16–21	8–7	SkyDome	33,269
15	16	Oct 20	vs. Saskatchewan Roughriders	W 59–15	9–7	SkyDome	40,429
16	17	Oct 28	at Saskatchewan Roughriders	L 31–33	9–8	Taylor Field	26,139
17	18	Nov 3	vs. Ottawa Rough Riders	W 49–30	10–8	SkyDome	36,321

== Postseason ==
Round	Date	Opponent	Results		Venue	Attendance
Round	Date	Opponent	Score	Record	Venue	Attendance
East Semi-Final	Sun, Nov 11	vs. Ottawa Rough Riders	W 34–25	1–0	SkyDome	24,427
East Final	Sun, Nov 18	at Winnipeg Blue Bombers	L 17–20	1–1	Winnipeg Stadium	29,192

== Roster ==
1990 Toronto Argonauts final roster
Quarterbacks: 15 John Congemi; 16 Matt Dunigan; 14 Rickey Foggie; 12 Willie Gillus; Running backs: 31 Michael Clemons; 33 Orvil Dixon; 30 Gerry Ifill; 25 Keith Kelly; 27 Paul Nastasiuk; 5 Kevin Smellie; Receivers: 80 Jeff Boyd; 28 Howard Dell; 85 Trumaine Johnson; 88 Paul Masotti; 86 Andrew Murray; 1 Darrell Smith	Offensive linemen: 56 Ian Beckstead C; 69 Dan Ferrone G; 63 Jim Kardash G; 66 Kelvin Pruenster T; 54 Blaine Schmidt T; 67 Chris Schultz T; 64 Bob Skemp G/C; Defensive linemen: 99 Mike Campbell DT; 35 Bruce Elliott DE; 70 Harold Hallman DT; 77 Rodney Harding DE/DT; 40 James Parker DE	Linebackers: 37 Keith Castello; 21 Darryl Ford; 38 Chris Gaines; 36 Don Moen; Defensive backs: 13 Ed Berry; 7 Carl Brazley; 23 Mike Hildebrand; 18 Chris Munford; 2 Reggie Pleasant; 29 Marcus Thomas; 17 Dave Van Belleghem; 20 Don Wilson; Special teams: 4 Lance Chomyc K; 8 Hank Ilesic P/K; Italics indicate International player

== Awards and honours ==
- CFL's Most Outstanding Player – Michael "Pinball" Clemons

=== 1990 CFL All-Stars ===
- SB – Darrell Smith, CFL All-Star
- OG – Dan Ferrone, CFL All-Star
- DT – Harold Hallman, CFL All-Star
- DB – Don Wilson, CFL All-Star
- ST – Michael "Pinball" Clemons, CFL All-Star
