= 1990 Saskatchewan Roughriders season =

CFL team season

- General manager: Alan Ford
- Head coach: John Gregory
- Home stadium: Taylor Field

Results
- Record: 9–9
- Division place: 3rd, West
- Playoffs: Lost West Semi-Final

Uniform

The 1990 Saskatchewan Roughriders season was the 76th season in the club's 80th year of existence. Following their win in the 1989 Grey Cup, the team opened this season as defending Grey Cup champions for the first time since 1967. The team finished in third place in the Canadian Football League's West Division with a 9–9 record for the second consecutive season. However, the Roughriders could not duplicate the success of the previous year as they lost to the Edmonton Eskimos in the West Semi-Final.

The Roughriders gained a team record 5793 passing yards, which at the time was the 3rd most for a team in a single season in CFL history. They also set CFL team records for:

- most pass attempts in a season (793), which was surpassed by the 1995 Birmingham Barracudas (814);
- most pass completions in a season (450), which has been surpassed by several teams.
- most field goals made one season (59)

They set the following team records:

- most points scored one season (557)
- most points scored against one season (592)
- highest single home game attendance: 31,121 in the Labour Day Classic against Winnipeg

== Offseason ==
=== CFL draft ===
Round	Pick	Player	Position	School
1	3	Glen Scrivener	DE/DT	William Jewell
1	8	Dane McArthur	SB/RB	Hawaii-Manoa
2	9	Bruce Boyko	SB/TE	Western Michigan
2	15	Chris Gioskos	T/G	Ottawa
2	16	Brent Chuhaniuk	P/K	Weber State
3	21	Craig Henderson	T/G	Minnesota
3	24	Bill Hitchcock	T/DT	Purdue
4	32	Paul Bushley	FB/HB	Colgate
5	40	Paul Chapman	RB/FB	Dickinson State

== Preseason ==
Game	Date	Opponent	Results		Venue	Attendance
Game	Date	Opponent	Score	Record	Venue	Attendance
A	Sun, June 24	vs. Winnipeg Blue Bombers	L 40–41	0–1	Gordie Howe Bowl	4,000
B	Fri, June 29	vs. Ottawa Rough Riders	L 23–26	0–2	Taylor Field	20,142
C	Tues, July 3	at Edmonton Eskimos	L 23–35	0–3	Commonwealth Stadium	10,130

== Regular season ==
=== Season standings ===
West Division
Pos	Team	Pld	W	L	T	PF	PA	PD	Pts
1	Calgary Stampeders (C, Q)	18	11	6	1	588	566	+22	23
2	Edmonton Eskimos (Q)	18	10	8	0	612	510	+102	20
3	Saskatchewan Roughriders (Q)	18	9	9	0	557	592	−35	18
4	BC Lions	18	6	11	1	520	620	−100	13

Source: "CFL.ca - Official Site of the Canadian Football League". Archived from the original on 2009-12-15.
(C) First round bye; (Q) Qualified for playoffs

=== Season schedule ===
Week	Game	Date	Opponent	Results		Venue	Attendance
Week	Game	Date	Opponent	Score	Record	Venue	Attendance
1	1	Thu, July 12	vs. Hamilton Tiger-Cats	W 38–35	1–0	Taylor Field	24,362
2	2	Thu, July 19	at Calgary Stampeders	L 25–30	1–1	McMahon Stadium	24,818
3	3	Fri, July 27	vs. Calgary Stampeders	L 16–54	1–2	Taylor Field	26,731
4	4	Thu, Aug 2	at BC Lions	W 36–25	2–2	BC Place	33,068
5	5	Tue, Aug 7	at Edmonton Eskimos	L 31–57	2–3	Commonwealth Stadium	39,060
6	6	Tue, Aug 14	vs. BC Lions	L 30–32	2–4	Taylor Field	22,976
6	7	Sun, Aug 19	vs. Edmonton Eskimos	W 49–24	3–4	Taylor Field	24,109
7	8	Sat, Aug 25	at Hamilton Tiger-Cats	W 46–33	4–4	Ivor Wynne Stadium	16,717
8	9	Sun, Sept 2	vs. Winnipeg Blue Bombers	W 55–11	5–4	Taylor Field	31,121
9	10	Sun, Sept 9	at Ottawa Rough Riders	L 21–30	5–5	Lansdowne Park	25,384
10	11	Sun, Sept 16	vs. Ottawa Rough Riders	W 45–19	6–5	Taylor Field	27,822
11	12	Sun, Sept 23	at Winnipeg Blue Bombers	L 7–36	6–6	Winnipeg Stadium	32,177
12	13	Sun, Sept 30	vs. BC Lions	W 37–34	7–6	Taylor Field	26,176
13	14	Sun, Oct 7	at Calgary Stampeders	L 16–23	7–7	McMahon Stadium	27,964
14	15	Sun, Oct 14	vs. Edmonton Eskimos	W 29–24	8–7	Commonwealth Stadium	27,423
15	16	Sat, Oct 20	at Toronto Argonauts	L 15–59	8–8	SkyDome	40,429
16	17	Sun, Oct 28	vs. Toronto Argonauts	W 33–31	9–8	Taylor Field	26,139
17	18	Sat, Nov 3	at BC Lions	L 28–35	9–9	BC Place	23,919

== Postseason ==
=== Schedule ===
Round	Date	Opponent	Results		Venue	Attendance
Round	Date	Opponent	Score	Record	Venue	Attendance
West Semi-Final	Sun, Nov 11	at Edmonton Eskimos	L 27–43	0–1	Commonwealth Stadium	23,006

== Roster ==
1990 Saskatchewan Roughriders final roster
Quarterbacks: 5 Kent Austin; 1 Jeff Bentrim; 9 Tony Rice; Running backs: 25 Paul Bushey; 31 Lucius Floyd; 32 Milson Jones; 22 Orville Lee; Receivers: 15 Bruce Boyko; 81 Ray Elgaard; 18 Jeff Fairholm; 9 Mark Guy; 86 Greg Harris; 80 Don Narcisse; 89 David Pitcher	Offensive linemen: 44 Roger Aldag G; 66 Mike Anderson C; 58 Chris Gioskos G; 75 Greg McCormack G/T; 64 Ken Moore T; 57 Bob Poley G/C; 62 Vic Stevenson T; Defensive linemen: 77 Wayne Drinkwalter DE/DT; 70 Vince Goldsmith DE; 71 Bobby Jurasin DE; 99 Chuck Klingbeil DT; 79 Gary Lewis DT; Special teams: 12 Mike Lazecki P; 36 Dave Ridgway K	Linebackers: 39 Dave Albright; 91 Tuineau Alipate; 41 James King; 42 Eddie Lowe; 74 Dan Rashovich; 47 Kelly Trithart; 90 Tony Visco; Defensive backs: 4 Albert Brown; 2 Stacey Hairston; 7 Richie Hall; 19 John Hoffman; 3 Larry Hogue; 27 Glen Suitor; 21 Jeff Treftlin; Italics indicate American player

== Awards and records ==
- CFL's Most Outstanding Canadian Award – Ray Elgaard (SB)
- CFLPA's Outstanding Community Service Award – Richie Hall (DB)

=== 1990 CFL All-Stars ===
- QB – Kent Austin
- WR – Don Narcisse
- OG – Roger Aldag
- K – Dave Ridgway

=== 1990 Western All-Stars ===
- QB – Kent Austin
- SB – Ray Elgaard
- WR – Don Narcisse
- OG – Roger Aldag
- LB – Dan Rashovich
- DB – Richie Hall
- K – Dave Ridgway
