= Ken Winey =

American football player (born 1962)

No. 26, 85
- Positions: Wide receiver, Slotback

Personal information
- Born: September 17, 1962 (age 64); Lake Charles, Louisiana, U.S.
- Listed height: 5 ft 11 in (1.80 m)
- Listed weight: 180 lb (82 kg)

Career information
- College: Southern (track and basketball)

Career history
- 1986–1991: Winnipeg Blue Bombers
- 1992: Edmonton Eskimos
- 1993: Toronto Argonauts

Awards and highlights
- 2× Grey Cup champion (1988, 1990)

Ken Winey (born September 17, 1962) is an American former professional football wide receiver who played seven seasons in the Canadian Football League (CFL) with the Winnipeg Blue Bombers, Edmonton Eskimos, and Toronto Argonauts. He participated in track and basketball at Southern University.

== Early life and college ==
Ken Winey was born on September 17, 1962, in Lake Charles, Louisiana. He set a Louisiana state record with a 7'1" high jump.

Winey participated in track and basketball for the Southern Jaguars of Southern University. He set a Coors' Inter-Conference Games record with a 7'3.5" high jump. He also had a Southwestern Athletic Conference record 7'2" high jump. Winey was the track team MVP in 1985. He earned four letters in track and one in basketball in college.

== Professional career ==
Winey had a 4.4 second 40-yard dash time. Despite never having played football before, Winey signed with the Winnipeg Blue Bombers of the Canadian Football League (CFL) in March 1986. On June 22, before the start of the 1986 season, it was reported that he had been cut by the Blue Bombers. Winey was then signed to the team's non-active roster and did not dress for any games during the 1986 season. He was listed as a non-import in the CFL due to his never having played American football before. He dressed in 16 games for the Blue Bombers during the 1987 season, catching eight passes for 80 yards and one touchdown while also returning 28 kickoffs for 552 yards and one touchdown and 33 punts for 211 yards. His 552 kickoff return yards were the most on the team that year. Winnipeg finished the 1987 season with an 11–7 record and lost in the Eastern finals to the Toronto Argonauts. Winey dressed in eight games in 1988, recording two receptions for 36 yards, four kickoff returns for 36 yards, and one punt return for eight yards. He spent part of the 1988 season on the injured list. On November 27, 1988, Winnipeg won the 76th Grey Cup against the BC Lions by a score of 22–21. On August 29, 1989, Winey caught five passes for 90 yards and two touchdowns. He played in all 18 games during the 1989 season, totaling ten receptions for 166 yards and two touchdowns, 27 kickoff returns for 421 yards, and 31 punt returns for 213 yards. His 421 yards were the most on the team. Winey dressed in eight games in 1990, catching 11 passes for 173 yards and one touchdown while also returning 11 kickoffs for 170 yards and 26 punts for 246 yards. He missed time in 1990 due to injury. On November 25, 1990, the Blue Bombers won the 78th Grey Cup against the Edmonton Eskimos 50–11. Winey dressed in three games in 1991, recording three catches for 34 yards, four kickoff returns for 79 yards, and eight punt returns for 132 yards. On July 25, 1991, Winey ripped his left knee and broke his right leg on the same kickoff return. He ended up missing the rest of the season.

On June 11, 1992, Winey was traded to the Edmonton Eskimos for future considerations. At the time of the trade, he was tenth all-time on Winnipeg's kickoff return yardage list. It was reported that the Blue Bombers had been unsure if Winey could pass a physical due to his injury from the prior year. Winey dressed in ten games for the Eskimos during the 1992 season, catching nine passes for a career-high 180 yards while returning one kickoff for seven yards and three punts for two yards.

On January 28, 1993, Winey, Tracy Ham, Enis Jackson, Travis Oliver, Craig Ellis, Chris Johnstone, John Davis, and the rights to Cam Brosseau were traded to the Toronto Argonauts for Rickey Foggie, Darrell K. Smith, Ed Berry, Eddie Brown, Leonard Johnson, Don Wilson, Bruce Dickson, and J. P. Izquierdo. The 16-player deal is the biggest trade in CFL history. Winey dressed in six games for the Argonauts during the 1993 season, totaling eight receptions for 83 yards, three kickoff returns for 36 yards, and four punt returns for 40 yards. He was cut by Toronto on September 15, 1993.

== Personal life ==
During the CFL offseason, Winey worked as a claims representative with State Farm Fire and Casualty Company.
