= Eric Streater =

American football player (born 1964)

No. 18
- Position: Wide receiver

Personal information
- Born: March 21, 1964 (age 62); Sylva, North Carolina, U.S.
- Listed height: 5 ft 11 in (1.80 m)
- Listed weight: 165 lb (75 kg)

Career information
- College: North Carolina
- NFL draft: 1987: undrafted

Career history
- Tampa Bay Buccaneers (1987); BC Lions (1988-1989); Winnipeg Blue Bombers (1990-1992)

Awards and highlights
- Grey Cup champion (1990)
- Stats at Pro Football Reference

Eric Maurice Streater (born March 21, 1964) is an American former professional football player who was a wide receiver in the National Football League (NFL) for the Tampa Bay Buccaneers, appearing in three games as a replacement player. He played college football for the North Carolina Tar Heels. He also played in the Canadian Football League (CFL) for the BC Lions and Winnipeg Blue Bombers.
