= Quency Williams =

American football player (1961–2022)

- Williams with the Winnipeg Blue Bombers

No. 91, 43
- Positions: Defensive end, linebacker

Personal information
- Born: April 10, 1961; Douglasville, Georgia, U.S.
- Died: April 2022 (aged 61); Douglasville, Georgia, U.S.
- Listed height: 6 ft 4 in (1.93 m)
- Listed weight: 230 lb (104 kg)

Career information
- High school: Douglas County (GA)
- College: Auburn (1980–1983)

Career history
- 1984: Birmingham Stallions*
- 1984–1985: Los Angeles Raiders
- 1986: Arizona Outlaws*
- 1987–1988: Calgary Stampeders
- 1989–1992: Winnipeg Blue Bombers
- 1992: BC Lions
- * Offseason or practice squad member only

Awards and highlights
- Grey Cup champion (1990)

Career CFL statistics
- Tackles: 221
- Sacks: 30

Quency Leon Williams (April 10, 1961 – April 2022) was an American professional gridiron football defensive end who played six seasons in the Canadian Football League (CFL) for the Calgary Stampeders and Winnipeg Blue Bombers. He played college football at Auburn and also had stints with the Birmingham Stallions, Los Angeles Raiders, Arizona Outlaws and BC Lions. He won the 78th Grey Cup with the Blue Bombers.

== Early life and education ==
Williams was born on April 10, 1961, in Douglasville, Georgia, and grew up there. He attended Douglas County High School, graduating in 1980. He committed to Auburn University and saw immediate playing time as a freshman on the football team. He played in every year of his at the school, and as a senior helped Auburn to the second-best run defense in the conference.

His brother Gregg Williams played college football for rival Georgia.

== Professional career ==
Williams was selected in the 1984 USFL Territorial Draft by the Birmingham Stallions, but was one of the team's final roster cuts.

In 1984, Williams was noticed by scouts of the Los Angeles Raiders, who gave him a tryout. His tryout was successful and he was given a contract, but he was soon after placed on injured reserve and did not make the final roster the following year in 1985.

Williams was later contacted by the Arizona Outlaws in the USFL, the Atlanta Falcons in the NFL, and by two teams from the Canadian Football League (CFL). He accepted an offer from Arizona, but the season was canceled before he got a chance to play.

In May 1987, Williams was signed by the Calgary Stampeders of the CFL. His position was changed from defensive end to outside linebacker, but was later changed back. He made the final roster and played in a total of ten games in his first year, as Calgary compiled a record of 10–8. Williams returned to the Stampeders in 1988, playing in all eighteen games and making nine quarterback sacks and 59 tackles. He was named the team's most valuable player by Canadian Airlines International and was awarded a trip to West Germany.

After the 1988 season ended, Williams tried out for the United States Bobsled Team.

In May 1989, Williams was traded to the Winnipeg Blue Bombers for future considerations. He changed his position to linebacker near the beginning of the season. He made the final roster and appeared in seventeen games, making 65 tackles and eight sacks. Williams returned to the defensive end position in 1990. That year, he played in fifteen games, making six sacks and 46 tackles as the Blue Bombers went on to win the 78th Grey Cup. In 1991, he played in just seven games, recording two sacks and 15 tackles. In 1992, he played in just one game before being released.

Shortly after being released by Winnipeg, Williams was signed by the BC Lions. He was released by the Lions on September 7, without appearing in a game. He finished his CFL career with 68 games played, 221 tackles, 30.0 sacks and two fumble recoveries.

== Later life and death ==
Williams was later a tow truck operator near Winnipeg. In 2002, he helped save the life of a man who had crashed his van into a Manitoba river.

Williams died of a heart attack in April 2022, shortly after his 61st birthday.
