= Ken Pettway =

American football player (born 1964)

No. 9, 8
- Position: Defensive back

Personal information
- Born: June 25, 1964 (age 62); Selma, Alabama, U.S.
- Listed height: 5 ft 10 in (1.78 m)
- Listed weight: 180 lb (82 kg)

Career information
- College: Santa Monica (1982–1983); California (1984–1985)
- NFL draft: 1986: undrafted

Career history
- 1986: Seattle Seahawks*
- 1987–1990: Winnipeg Blue Bombers
- 1991–1992: BC Lions
- * Offseason or practice squad member only

Awards and highlights
- 2× Grey Cup champion (1988, 1990)

Ken Pettway (born June 25, 1964) is an American former professional football defensive back who played six seasons in the Canadian Football League (CFL) with the Winnipeg Blue Bombers and BC Lions. He played college football at Santa Monica College and University of California, Berkeley.

== Early life and college ==
Ken Pettway was born on June 25, 1964, in Selma, Alabama. He played college football at Santa Monica College from 1982 to 1983. He was then a two-year letterman for the California Golden Bears of the University of California, Berkeley from 1984 to 1985. He recorded one interception in 1984.

== Professional career ==
After going undrafted in the 1986 NFL draft, Pettway signed with the Seattle Seahawks on May 7, 1986. He was cut by the Seahawks on August 18, 1986.

Pettway was signed by the Winnipeg Blue Bombers of the Canadian Football League (CFL) on March 24, 1987. He dressed in eight games for the Blue Bombers as a rookie in 1987, recording 36 tackles, two interceptions, and 12 punt returns for 84 yards. He dressed in 11 games in 1988, totaling 50 tackles, one interception, 14 punt returns for 73 yards, and three kickoff returns for 57 yards. Winnipeg finished the 1988 season with a 9–9 and eventually advanced to the 76th Grey Cup, where they beat the BC Lions by a score of 22–21. Pettway dressed in 17 games for the Blue Bombers in 1989, posting 66 tackles and three interceptions. He dressed in 11 games during his final year with Winnipeg in 1990, recording 26 tackles, one sack, and three interceptions. The Blue Bombers finished the season 12–6 and won the 78th Grey Cup against the Edmonton Eskimos 50–11.

On July 6, 1991, he was traded to the BC Lions for a third-round pick in the 1992 CFL draft. He dressed in 17 games for the Lions during the 1991 season, totaling 65 defensive tackles, seven special teams tackles, and five interceptions for 114 yards. He dressed in a career-low five games in 1992, recording 10 defensive tackles, before being released in late August 1992. He spent part of the season on the injured list.
