= 1990 BC Lions season =

Canadian football team season

- Owner: Murray Pezim
- General manager: Joe Kapp; Jim Young; Bob O'Billovich
- Head coach: Lary Kuharich; Jim Young (Interim); Bob O'Billovich
- Home stadium: BC Place Stadium

Results
- Record: 6–11–1
- Division place: 4th, West
- Playoffs: did not qualify

Uniform

The 1990 BC Lions finished in fourth place in the West Division with a 6–11–1 record and failed to make to playoffs.

== Offseason ==
=== CFL draft ===
Round	Pick	Player	Position	School
1	2	Ian Beckles	OG/DT	Indiana
2	10	Ken Whitney	OG/TE	California Lutheran
2	12	Keith Kelly	RB	Bishop's
4	26	Carl Coulter	OG/LB	Carleton
5	34	Mohammed Elewonibi	OG/LB	Brigham Young
6	42	Doug Shorman	LB	British Columbia
7	50	Phil Poirier	DT/DE	Cincinnati
8	58	Richard Kitchener	OT/OL	Simon Fraser

== Preseason ==
Game	Date	Opponent	Results		Venue	Attendance
Game	Date	Opponent	Score	Record	Venue	Attendance
A	Thu, June 28	vs. Edmonton Eskimos	W 24–23	1–0	BC Place	27,905
B	Tue, July 3	at Winnipeg Blue Bombers	W 36–20	2–0	Winnipeg Stadium	32,111

== Regular season ==
=== Season standings ===
West Division
Pos	Team	Pld	W	L	T	PF	PA	PD	Pts
1	Calgary Stampeders (C, Q)	18	11	6	1	588	566	+22	23
2	Edmonton Eskimos (Q)	18	10	8	0	612	510	+102	20
3	Saskatchewan Roughriders (Q)	18	9	9	0	557	592	−35	18
4	BC Lions	18	6	11	1	520	620	−100	13

Source: "CFL.ca - Official Site of the Canadian Football League". Archived from the original on 2009-12-15.
(C) First round bye; (Q) Qualified for playoffs

=== Season schedule ===
Week	Game	Date	Opponent	Results		Venue	Attendance
Week	Game	Date	Opponent	Score	Record	Venue	Attendance
1	1	Fri, July 13	vs. Calgary Stampeders	T 38–38	0–0–1	BC Place	34,233
2	2	Wed, July 18	at Edmonton Eskimos	L 23–41	0–1–1	Commonwealth Stadium	38,401
3	3	Fri, July 27	vs. Winnipeg Blue Bombers	W 24–23	1–1–1	BC Place	34,622
4	4	Thu, Aug 2	vs. Saskatchewan Roughriders	L 25–36	1–2–1	BC Place	33,068
5	5	Wed, Aug 8	at Winnipeg Blue Bombers	L 14–28	1–3–1	Winnipeg Stadium	25,952
6	6	Tue, Aug 14	at Saskatchewan Roughriders	W 32–30	2–3–1	Taylor Field	22,976
6	7	Mon, Aug 20	vs. Hamilton Tiger-Cats	L 34–36	2–4–1	BC Place	32,699
7	Bye						
8	8	Tue, Aug 28	at Ottawa Rough Riders	L 34–41	2–5–1	Lansdowne Park	22,450
8	9	Sat, Sept 1	at Toronto Argonauts	L 43–68	2–6–1	SkyDome	31,003
9	10	Thu, Sept 6	vs. Toronto Argonauts	L 19–49	2–7–1	BC Place	36,330
10	11	Thu, Sept 13	vs. Edmonton Eskimos	L 13–32	2–8–1	BC Place	26,830
11	12	Sat, Sept 22	at Hamilton Tiger-Cats	W 34–4	3–8–1	Ivor Wynne Stadium	10,270
13	13	Sun, Sept 30	at Saskatchewan Roughriders	L 34–37	3–9–1	Taylor Field	26,176
14	14	Sat, Oct 6	vs. Ottawa Rough Riders	L 26–42	3–10–1	BC Place	27,905
15	15	Sun, Oct 14	at Calgary Stampeders	W 33–25	4–10–1	McMahon Stadium	18,154
16	16	Sun, Oct 21	at Edmonton Eskimos	W 30–8	5–10–1	Commonwealth Stadium	31,176
17	17	Sat, Oct 27	vs. Calgary Stampeders	L 29–54	5–11–1	BC Place	29,536
18	18	Sat, Nov 3	vs. Saskatchewan Roughriders	W 35–28	6–11–1	BC Place	26,342

== Roster ==
1990 BC Lions final roster
Quarterbacks: 22 Doug Flutie; 9 Major Harris; 6 Joe Paopao; Running backs: 25 Dave Eldridge; 28 Lorenzo Graham; 34 Ryan Hanson; 33 Mike Marasco; 20 Chris Skinner; 23 Jamie Taras; Receivers: 88 Ray Alexander; 10 Brian Bedford; 27 Jan Carinci; 83 Jay Christensen; 81 Darrell Colbert; 24 Tony Dennis; 82 Tim Egerton; 80 Tony Hunter; 25 Eric Starr	Offensive linemen: 67 Larry Clarkson T; 59 Carl Coulter C/G; 53 Leo Groenewegen G; 66 Jim Mills T; 58 Rocco Romano G; 55 Ian Sinclair C; 54 Dan Payne T; 68 Ken Whitney T/G; Defensive linemen: 79 Derek MacCready DT; 63 Phil Poirier DT; 97 Tony Simmons DT/DE; 35 Paul Wetmore DE; 78 Deatrich Wise DE	Linebackers: 44 Alondra Johnson; 39 Doug Landry; 36 Nico Perkins; 32 Willie Pless; 93 Shawn Stewart; Defensive backs: 18 Robin Belanger; 6 Anthony Drawhorn; 12 Norman Jefferson; 13 Chris Major; 8 Rick Ryan; 21 Andrew Thomas; 11 Remi Trudel; 3 Ken Watson; Special teams: 5 Lui Passaglia K/P; Italics indicate International player

== Awards and records ==
- CFL's Most Outstanding Offensive Lineman Award – Jim Mills (OT)

=== 1990 CFL All-Stars ===
- OT – Jim Mills, CFL All-Star
- LB – Willie Pless, CFL All-Star
