= Rod Hill =

American gridiron football player (born 1959)

No. 25, 47, 38
- Position: Cornerback

Personal information
- Born: March 14, 1959 (age 67); Detroit, Michigan, U.S.
- Listed height: 6 ft 0 in (1.83 m)
- Listed weight: 185 lb (84 kg)

Career information
- College: Kentucky State
- NFL draft: 1982: 1st round, 25th overall pick

Career history
- 1982–1983: Dallas Cowboys
- 1984–1986: Buffalo Bills
- 1986: Detroit Lions
- 1987: Los Angeles Raiders
- 1988–1992: Winnipeg Blue Bombers

Awards and highlights
- 2× Grey Cup champion (1988, 1990); Second-team NAIA All-American (1980); 2× CFL All-Star (1989, 1990); 2× CFL East All-Star (1989, 1990)
- Stats at Pro Football Reference

Rodrick Hill (born March 14, 1959) is an American former professional football player who was a cornerback in the National Football League (NFL) and Canadian Football League (CFL). He played college football for the Kentucky State Thorobreds. Hill played in the NFL for the Dallas Cowboys, Buffalo Bills, Detroit Lions, and Los Angeles Raiders. After his NFL career, he played five seasons in the CFL with the Winnipeg Blue Bombers and still holds the career interception record for that franchise.

== Early life ==
Hill attended Martin Luther King High School. He accepted a scholarship to the University of Iowa, where as a wide receiver, he felt he had few opportunities to prove his worth in the team's run-oriented offense. He decided to transfer to Kentucky State University at the end of his first semester.

As a sophomore, he was converted into a cornerback to take advantage of his athleticism. He had 5 interceptions (led the team) and 25 punt returns for a 21.7-yard average (led the NAIA). Against Morris Brown College, he made 2 interceptions and returned a punt for a 77-yard touchdown. Against Central State University, he returned a punt for an 87-yard touchdown.

As a junior, he registered 2 interceptions (led the team) and led the NAIA with a 31.8-yard average on 18 punt returns. He posted 30.1-yard average on 9 kickoff returns. He missed 3 contests with a sprained ankle.

Hill finished his college career with 8 career interceptions and was considered an excellent return specialist, returning 50 punts for 1,182 yards (school-record 23.6-yards average) and 31 kickoffs for a 22.5 yard average. As a senior, he played in the East–West Shrine Game and the Senior Bowl.

In 2000, he was inducted into the Kentucky State University Athletics Hall of Fame. In 2011, he was inducted into the Kentucky Pro Football Hall of Fame.

== Professional career ==
=== Dallas Cowboys ===
After private workouts with defensive assistant coach Gene Stallings and being rated very high for his athletic abilities, the Dallas Cowboys selected Hill in the first round (25th overall) of the 1982 NFL draft. The team used him as a nickel cornerback and special teams returner, but struggled in both roles. He replaced an injured Ron Fellows late in the season and the playoffs.

He had irregular performances in the 1982 playoff games. Against the Tampa Bay Buccaneers, he was replaced with Monty Hunter, after he missed a tackle that allowed Gordon Jones to have a 49-yard touchdown reception, for a 17-16 third quarter lead. The next game was his finest moment as a Cowboy, besides playing a key role as the nickel cornerback on passing downs in a 37-26 victory against the Green Bay Packers, in the third quarter he returned a kickoff 89 yards (tied for second in NFL playoff history), which led to a key field goal and in the fourth quarter he also blocked a Jan Stenerud conversion kick. Conversely, in the Washington Redskins playoff game, his goal line muffed punt contributed to the team loss.

Hill continued to struggle in 1983 and lost the nickel cornerback position to Fellows. Eventually his teammates also started to turn on him, so the Cowboys traded him to the Buffalo Bills in the 1984 offseason, in exchange for a fifth round draft choice (#119-Matt Darwin) in 1985, plus a sixth (#140-Thornton Chandler) and a twelfth selection (#307-Chris Duliban) in 1986. In Cowboys lore, Hill would become the symbol of the failed draft strategy of the Eighties decade, when the team took too many gambles.

=== Buffalo Bills ===
In 1984, he fractured his ankle in the second game of the season and was placed on the injured reserve list. The longer than expected recovery from the injury and a broken hand, limited him to 10 games (5 starts) in 1985. He was used mostly as a punt returner until his release on October 14, 1986.

=== Detroit Lions ===
On October 16, 1986, Hill was claimed by the Detroit Lions to replace injured cornerback Bobby Watkins. He played in one game, before being cut and later re-signed for the last 2 games, to replace an injured John Bostic. He was waived on September 1, 1987.

=== Los Angeles Raiders ===
After the players went on a strike on the third week of the 1987 season, those games were canceled (reducing the 16 game season to 15) and the NFL decided that the games would be played with replacement players. Hill was signed to be a part of the Los Angeles Raiders replacement team, that was given the mock name "Masqueraiders" by the media. He went on to start all three games at cornerback and stayed a few weeks after the strike ended, before being released.

=== Winnipeg Blue Bombers ===
Hill signed with the Winnipeg Blue Bombers of the Canadian Football League in May of 1988, where he became a dominant player. He was the team's starting cornerback for five seasons and was part of two Grey Cups championships. He received CFL All-Star honors in 1989 and 1990.

He retired at the end of the 1992 season, with team records for most career interceptions (47), most interceptions in one game (5) and career blocked punts (8). In 1996, he was inducted into the Winnipeg Football Club Hall of Fame.

== Personal life ==
Hill worked as a banker in Winnipeg and also managed a Wal-Mart in Orangeville, Ontario.
