= Kent Austin =

American football player and coach (born 1963)

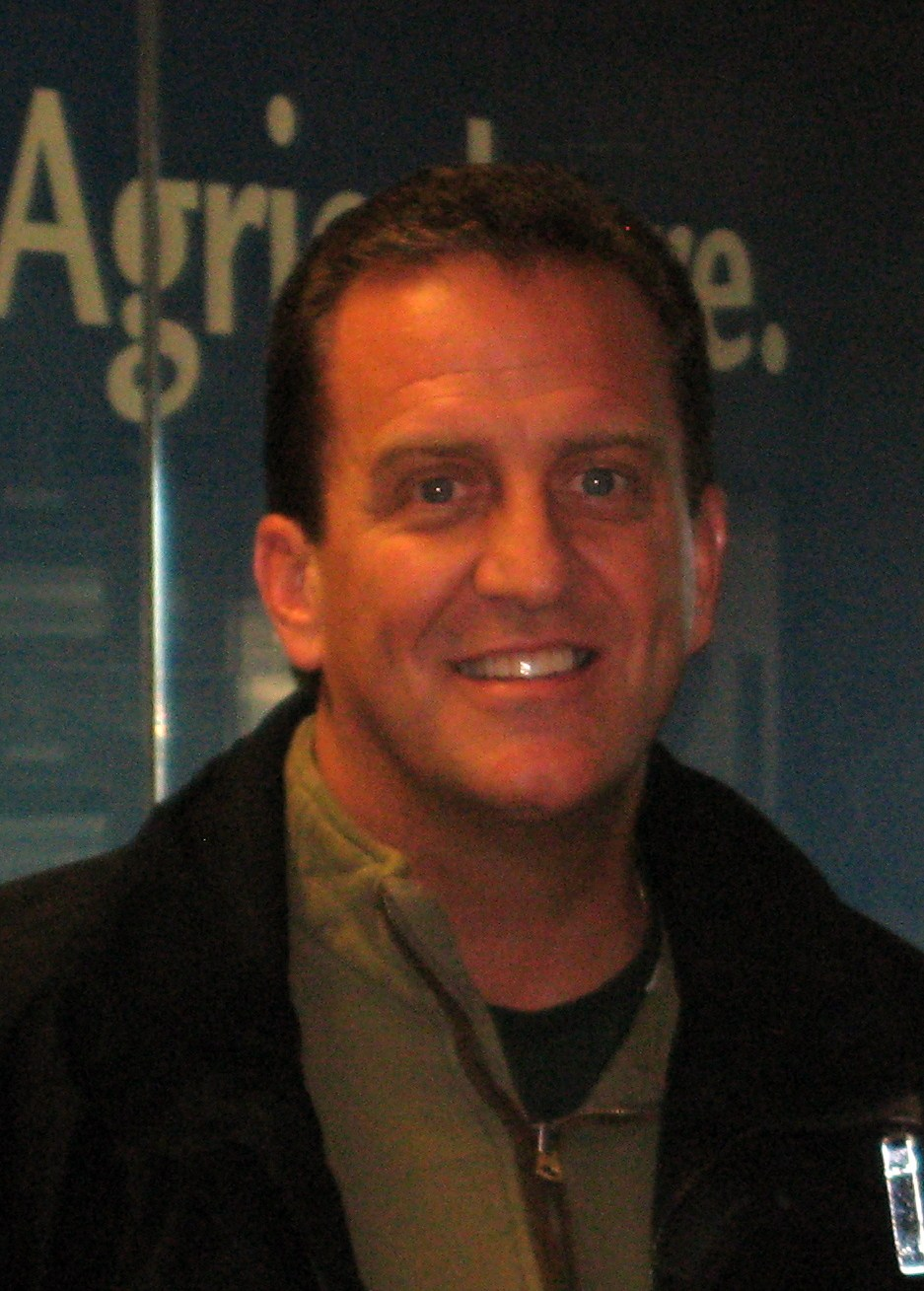
- Austin in 2018

Personal information
- Born: June 25, 1963 (age 63); Natick, Massachusetts, U.S.
- Listed height: 6 ft 1 in (1.85 m)
- Listed weight: 195 lb (88 kg)

Career information
- High school: Brentwood Academy (Brentwood, Tennessee)
- College: Ole Miss
- NFL draft: 1986: 12th round, 312th overall pick

Career history

Playing
- St. Louis Cardinals (1986); Saskatchewan Roughriders (1987–1993); BC Lions (1994); Toronto Argonauts (1995); Winnipeg Blue Bombers (1996)

Coaching
- Ottawa Renegades (2003) Quarterbacks coach; Toronto Argonauts (2004–2006) Offensive coordinator; Saskatchewan Roughriders (2007) Head coach; Ole Miss (2008–2009) Offensive coordinator; Cornell (2010–2012) Head coach; Hamilton Tiger-Cats (2013–2017) Head coach; Liberty (2019–2022) Co-offensive coordinator/quarterbacks coach; Auburn (2023) Offensive analyst; Auburn (2024–2025) Quarterbacks coach

Operations
- Hamilton Tiger-Cats (2013–2015) Vice president of football operations/general manager; Hamilton Tiger-Cats (2016–2018) Vice president of football operations

Awards and highlights
- 4× Grey Cup champion (1989, 1994, 2004, 2007); Grey Cup MVP (1989); CFL records: Most passing attempts in a season = 770 (1992); Most passing attempts in a game = 65 (1991)
- Stats at Pro Football Reference

Richard Kent Austin (born June 25, 1963) is an American football coach and former player. He played as a quarterback in the National Football League (NFL) and Canadian Football League (CFL). He was the MVP of the 77th Grey Cup.

Austin served as the head football coach at Cornell University from 2010 to 2012. He was the head coach of the Saskatchewan Roughriders of the CFL in 2007 and CFL's Hamilton Tiger-Cats from 2013 to 2017.

== College career ==
Following high school at Brentwood Academy, Austin went to the University of Mississippi and played quarterback in the early 1980s. He ranks seventh in passing yards in the Ole Miss records, behind Eli Manning, Bo Wallace, Matt Corral, Chad Kelly, Jaxson Dart and Romaro Miller. Austin was an Academic All-American in each of his four college seasons and is a member of the University of Mississippi Sports Hall of Fame.

== Professional career ==
=== NFL ===
After college, Austin was selected in the 12th round (312th overall) of the 1986 NFL draft by the St. Louis Cardinals. He played a single season in the NFL as the team's third-string quarterback, rushing one time for zero yards, and not attempting a single pass. In 1987, the Cardinals chose not to resign Austin.

=== CFL ===
On September 8, 1987, Austin joined the Saskatchewan Roughriders. He made his first CFL start at quarterback when Saskatchewan visited Hamilton on October 11, a game Saskatchewan won. Austin started the last 5 games of the 1987 season.

Throughout the 1988 and 1989 seasons, Austin shared quarterback duties with Tom Burgess. When Austin got injured in the 1989 West Final in Edmonton, Burgess relieved him. With the efforts of both quarterbacks, the 9-9 Roughriders were able to defeat the 16-2 Eskimos. Austin got the start in the Grey Cup game, and helped guide Saskatchewan to its second ever Grey Cup win. He was awarded the game's Offensive Most Valuable Player after leading the Roughriders down the field to kick the game-winning field goal, and throwing for 474 yards, which was the second most yards thrown in a Grey Cup game at the time.

In 1990, Austin became Saskatchewan's undisputed starting quarterback after Burgess was traded to the Winnipeg Blue Bombers. That year, Austin threw a 107 yard touchdown pass to Jeff Fairholm against Winnipeg in the Labour Day Classic. Austin led the CFL that year in passing yards (4604), attempts (618), and completions (360). The latter two statistics were second all-time in a single CFL season. He was nominated a CFL West All-Star and CFL League All-Star for the first, and only, time in his career.

In 1991, Austin missed 5 games with injury, but was still able to throw for 4,137 yards and 32 touchdowns. On September 15, 1991, when the Roughriders hosted Edmonton, he set a CFL record for most passing attempts in a regular season game with 65. Also that year, Austin tied Sam Etcheverry's CFL record for most consecutive 300-yard passing games with 9; 4 consecutive of these games were 400-yard games, a CFL record for consecutive 400-yard games.

The 1992 season was statistically his best CFL season. Austin led the CFL in passing yards, attempts, and completions for the second time in his career, and passing touchdowns for the first and only time in his career. He became only the third CFL quarterback (Warren Moon and Doug Flutie) to pass for 5,000 yards in a single season, and the second CFL quarterback (Flutie) to hit 6,000 passing yards in a single season. His 770 attempts were a CFL single season record, and his 459 completions were second in a single season. His 35 touchdown passes were a Roughrider single season record. In the West Semi-Final in Edmonton, Austin threw 32 completions, second most in a playoff game, and 468 yards, third most in a playoff game.

1993, Austin's 7th and final in Saskatchewan, saw him once again throw for over 5,000 yards and over 30 touchdowns. His 715 pass attempts were 3rd most in a single CFL season. On October 31 in Toronto, he tied Dieter Brock's 1981 CFL record for most passing completions in a regular season game with 41. Also in that game, Austin threw for over 500 yards, the second consecutive game in which he threw for that yardage.

In Austin's final two seasons in Saskatchewan, he threw for an eye-popping 11,979 yards. When he left the Roughriders, he was second only to Ron Lancaster in many of the Roughriders all-time passing statistics. The top 11 single game passing yardage totals in team history belonged to Austin. He also finished second in team history to George Reed for career rushing touchdowns (34), many of which were on quarterback sneaks.

Prior to the 1994 season, he was traded to the Ottawa Rough Riders, who then traded him to the B.C. Lions. This season, Austin threw for 4193 yards, making him the first CFL quarterback to throw for 4,000 yards in five different seasons, and in five consecutive seasons. He was part of the team's Grey Cup win, starting the game before leaving with injury. Austin was replaced by Danny McManus, who would lead the Lions to a win on a last-second field goal.

Austin was traded to the Toronto Argonauts in 1995. He was the second Ole Miss star to play quarterback for Toronto, the first being Eagle Day in 1967. Austin joined the Winnipeg Blue Bombers in 1996, playing only one season with the team before being released on February 11, 1997.

When Austin's 10 year career as a CFL quarterback was complete, he ranked in the top 10 in numerous CFL all-time regular season passing statistics:

- 3rd in attempts (4,700)
- 4th in completions (2,709)
- 4th in yards (36,030)
- 7th in touchdowns (198)
- 3rd in 300-yard games (48)
- 2nd in 400-yard games (19)

In the Columbo episode "A Bird in the Hand..." (air date November 22, 1992), footage from a Saskatchewan Roughriders versus Edmonton Eskimos game was used to portray a fictional game played by a football team called "The Stallions". As the footage showed Kent Austin playing and wearing the No. 5 jersey, the actor playing the quarterback wore a jersey bearing that number throughout the television episode. When a scene required seeing the quarterback in play, they used footage of Kent Austin.

In 1999, Austin was inducted into the Saskatchewan Roughriders Plaza of Honour.

== CFL career statistics ==
=== Regular season ===
| | | Passing | | | | | | | Rushing |
| Year | Team | Att | Comp | Pct | Yards | TD | Int | Rating | Att | Yards | Avg | Long | TD |
|---|---|---|---|---|---|---|---|---|---|---|---|---|---|
| 1987 | SSK | 156 | 93 | 59.6 | 1,172 | 3 | 10 | 62.8 | 24 | 138 | 5.8 | 31 | 0 |
| 1988 | SSK | 277 | 162 | 58.5 | 2,084 | 8 | 12 | 73.7 | 51 | 258 | 5.1 | 34 | 2 |
| 1989 | SSK | 323 | 183 | 56.7 | 2,650 | 16 | 12 | 84.5 | 42 | 168 | 4.0 | 18 | 3 |
| 1990 | SSK | 618 | 360 | 58.3 | 4,604 | 27 | 27 | 78.0 | 50 | 158 | 3.2 | 17 | 5 |
| 1991 | SSK | 554 | 302 | 54.5 | 4,137 | 32 | 18 | 84.3 | 21 | 10 | 0.5 | 9 | 6 |
| 1992 | SSK | 770 | 459 | 59.6 | 6,225 | 35 | 30 | 84.4 | 71 | 200 | 2.8 | 17 | 11 |
| 1993 | SSK | 715 | 405 | 56.6 | 5,754 | 31 | 25 | 82.7 | 32 | 88 | 2.8 | 21 | 7 |
| 1994 | BC | 551 | 317 | 57.5 | 4,193 | 24 | 22 | 79.6 | 29 | 102 | 3.5 | 16 | 3 |
| 1995 | TOR | 422 | 252 | 59.7 | 3,076 | 14 | 19 | 74.5 | 17 | 35 | 2.1 | 12 | 1 |
| 1996 | WPG | 314 | 176 | 56.1 | 2,135 | 8 | 16 | 64.4 | 21 | 100 | 4.8 | 16 | 0 |
| SSK totals | | 3,413 | 1,964 | 57.5 | 26,626 | 152 | 134 | 81.0 | 291 | 1,020 | 3.5 | 34 | 34 |
| CFL totals | | 4,700 | 2,709 | 57.6 | 36,030 | 198 | 191 | 78.0 | 358 | 1,257 | 3.5 | 34 | 38 |

This QB rating may be based on NFL system.

=== Playoffs ===
| Year & game | Team | GP | GS | ATT | COMP | YD | TD | INT | RUSH | YD | TD |
|---|---|---|---|---|---|---|---|---|---|---|---|
| 1988 West Semi-Final | SSK | 1 | 0 | 0 | - | - | - | - | 0 | - | - |
| 1989 West Semi-Final | SSK | 1 | 1 | 35 | 22 | 185 | 0 | 3 | 4 | 25 | 0 |
| 1989 West Final | SSK | 1 | 1 | 17 | 7 | 78 | 1 | 1 | 0 | - | - |
| 1990 West Semi-Final | SSK | 1 | 1 | 35 | 22 | 208 | 1 | 2 | 0 | - | - |
| 1992 West Semi-Final | SSK | 1 | 1 | 46 | 32 | 468 | 2 | 1 | 1 | 1 | 0 |
| 1993 West Semi-Final | SSK | 1 | 1 | 37 | 26 | 303 | 1 | 0 | 0 | - | - |
| 1994 West Semi-Final | BC | 1 | 0 | 24 | 12 | 163 | 0 | 0 | 0 | - | - |
| 1994 West Final | BC | 1 | 1 | 28 | 16 | 254 | 1 | 0 | 2 | 4 | 0 |
| 1996 West Semi-Final | WPG | 1 | 1 | 8 | 4 | 36 | 0 | 1 | 0 | - | - |
| Totals | | 9 | 7 | 230 | 141 | 1,695 | 6 | 8 | 7 | 30 | 0 |

=== Grey Cup ===
| Year | Team | GP | GS | ATT | COMP | YD | TD | INT | RUSH | YD | TD |
|---|---|---|---|---|---|---|---|---|---|---|---|
| 1989 | SSK | 1 | 1 | 41 | 26 | 474 | 3 | 1 | 2 | 8 | 0 |
| 1994 | BC | 1 | 1 | 16 | 6 | 69 | 0 | 3 | 0 | - | - |
| Totals | | 2 | 2 | 57 | 32 | 543 | 3 | 4 | 2 | 8 | 0 |

== Coaching career ==
In 2003, Austin entered coaching as the Quarterbacks Coach of the Ottawa Renegades of the Canadian Football League (CFL). The following year, he was hired as the Toronto Argonauts' Offensive Coordinator, helping lead the team to an offensive surge that allowed the franchise to win the 2004 Grey Cup. Under Austin's tutelage, quarterback Damon Allen, who was age 41, won the Grey Cup MVP award. In 2005, Austin coordinated an offence that allowed Allen, now age 42, to, for the first time in his career, throw for 5,000 yards in a season as well as win the CFL Most Outstanding Player award. Austin was fired during the 2006 season.

In December 2006, Austin was hired to be the 26th Head Coach of the Saskatchewan Roughriders. In 2007, Saskatchewan's quarterback was Kerry Joseph, with whom Austin had worked in 2003 in Ottawa; Joseph won the 2007 CFL Most Outstanding Player award. Saskatchewan finished 12-6 and hosted their first playoff game since 1988 when Austin was a quarterback for the team. On November 25, 2007, Austin coached the Saskatchewan Roughriders to the 95th Grey Cup Championship beating the Winnipeg Blue Bombers 23–19. In doing so, Austin became the first head coach to win a professional football championship for the same team with which he won the championship as a quarterback. He did so in his first year as head coach, and at the same stadium where he won the cup as a player, 18 years earlier. His performance as head coach won him the 2007 Annis Stukus Trophy as CFL coach of the year.

On January 16, 2008, Austin accepted the job as Offensive coordinator at the University of Mississippi, his alma mater, to serve under head coach Houston Nutt. In 2008 Austin's offense ranked 28th nationally scoring 32 points a game up from 20 points a game in 2007.

On January 26, 2010, Austin accepted the head coaching job at Cornell University replacing Jim Knowles who left Cornell to become the defensive coordinator for David Cutcliffe at Duke University.

On December 17, 2012, Austin signed on as the head coach, general manager and vice president of football operations of the Hamilton Tiger-Cats of the CFL. He led the Tiger-Cats to consecutive Grey Cup appearances in his first two years as head coach. On March 11, 2016, he appointed Eric Tillman to replace his as general manager.

On August 24, 2017, Austin stepped down as head coach and appointed June Jones as his replacement. On April 12, 2018, Austin stepped down as vice president of football operations of the Tiger-Cats and became a consultant for the team.

== Head coaching record ==
=== CFL ===
| Team | Year | Regular season | | | | | Postseason | | |
| Team | Year | Won | Lost | Ties | Win % | Finish | Won | Lost | Result |
|---|---|---|---|---|---|---|---|---|---|
| SSK | 2007 | 12 | 6 | 0 | .667 | 2nd in West Division | 3 | 0 | Won Grey Cup |
| HAM | 2013 | 10 | 8 | 0 | .555 | 2nd in East Division | 2 | 1 | Lost in Grey Cup |
| HAM | 2014 | 9 | 9 | 0 | .500 | 1st in East Division | 1 | 1 | Lost in Grey Cup |
| HAM | 2015 | 10 | 8 | 0 | .555 | 2nd in East Division | 1 | 1 | Lost in East Final |
| HAM | 2016 | 7 | 11 | 0 | .389 | 2nd in East Division | 0 | 1 | Lost in East Semi-Final |
| HAM | 2017 | 0 | 8 | 0 | .000 | Resigned | 0 | 0 | |
| Total | | 48 | 50 | 0 | .490 | 1 Division; Championship | 7 | 4 | 1 Grey Cup |

=== College ===
| Year | Team | Overall | Conference | Standing | Bowl/playoffs |
|---|---|---|---|---|---|
Cornell Big Red (Ivy League) (2010–2012)
| 2010 | Cornell | 2–8 | 1–6 | 7th | |
| 2011 | Cornell | 5–5 | 3–4 | 6th | |
| 2012 | Cornell | 4–6 | 2–5 | T–6th | |
| Cornell: | | 11–19 | 6–15 | | |
| Total: | | 11–19 | | | |
