= Harold Hallman =

American gridiron football player (1962–2005)

No. 99
- Position: Defensive tackle

Personal information
- Born: December 10, 1962; Macon, Georgia, U.S.
- Died: December 23, 2005 (aged 43); Macon, Georgia, U.S.

Career information
- College: Auburn
- NFL draft: 1986: 10th round, 270th overall pick

Career history
- 1986–1988: Calgary Stampeders
- 1988–1993: Toronto Argonauts

Awards and highlights
- Grey Cup champion (1991); CFL's Most Outstanding Rookie Award (1986); Jackie Parker Trophy (1986); 4× CFL All-Star (1986, 1989, 1990, 1991); 3× CFL East All-Star (1989, 1990, 1991); CFL West All-Star (1986); First-team All-SEC (1985)

Harold Hallman (December 10, 1962 – December 23, 2005) was a Canadian Football League (CFL) defensive tackle who played eight seasons in the CFL, mainly for the Toronto Argonauts. Hallman was a four-time All Star and won a Grey Cup with Toronto in 1991. He also won both the CFL's Most Outstanding Rookie Award and the Jackie Parker Trophy in 1986. He was drafted by the San Francisco 49ers of the National Football League (NFL) in the 10th round of the 1986 NFL draft, after playing college football at Auburn University. His selection by the 49ers was made following a recommendation to 49ers head coach Bill Walsh by actor Bradford Dillman. Hallman died in a Macon, Georgia hospital after surgical complications.

== College career ==
Hallman played college football at Auburn University. He was a starting nose guard for three seasons.
