= Keith Gooch =

American gridiron football player (born 1959)

Profile
- Position: Defensive back

Personal information
- Born: August 31, 1959 (age 67); Fort Ord, California, U.S.

Career information
- College: Fresno State

Career history
- 1984–1989: BC Lions
- 1990: Edmonton Eskimos

Awards and highlights
- Grey Cup champion (1985)

Career statistics
- Interceptions: 41
- Sacks: 2
- Touchdowns: 5

Keith Gooch (born August 31, 1959) is an American former professional football defensive back in the Canadian Football League (CFL). He played for the BC Lions and Edmonton Eskimos. Gooch played college football at Fresno State, where he was a running back.
