= Derrick Crawford (wide receiver) =

American gridiron football player (born 1960)

Profile
- Positions: Wide receiver, return specialist

Personal information
- Born: September 3, 1960 (age 66); Memphis, Tennessee, U.S.
- Listed height: 5 ft 10 in (1.78 m)
- Listed weight: 185 lb (84 kg)

Career information
- High school: East (Memphis)
- College: Memphis State
- Supplemental draft: 1984: 1st round, 24th overall pick

Career history
- Memphis Showboats (1984–1985); San Francisco 49ers (1986); Calgary Stampeders (1990–1993); Birmingham Barracudas (1995)

Awards and highlights
- Grey Cup champion (1992); All-USFL (1984)

Career NFL statistics
- Receptions: 5
- Receiving yards: 70
- Stats at Pro Football Reference

Career CFL statistics
- Receptions: 179
- Receiving yards: 3,050
- Receiving touchdowns: 28
- Return yards: 3,130
- Return touchdowns: 5

Derrick Crawford (born September 3, 1960) is an American former professional football player who was a wide receiver and return specialist in the National Football League (NFL), United States Football League (USFL) and Canadian Football League (CFL). He played college football for the Memphis Tigers.

== Early life ==
Crawford was born and grew up in Memphis, Tennessee and attended East High School, where he played quarterback. As a senior he was awarded the Walter Stewart Memorial Award by the Memphis Quarterback Club as back-of-the-year for the Memphis area.

== College career ==
Crawford was a member of the Memphis State Tigers for four seasons. He was the team's leading receiver as a junior with 31 receptions for 594 yards and three touchdowns and as a senior, when he caught 32 passes for 523 yards and two touchdowns and was named All-Metro Conference.

== Professional career ==
Crawford was selected by the Memphis Showboats in the 1984 USFL territorial draft. As a rookie, Crawford caught 61 passes for 703 yards and 12 touchdowns and was named All-USFL as a return specialist after returning 47 kickoffs for 1,237 yards and one touchdown. In 1985, had 70 receptions for 1,057 yards and nine touchdowns and also scored a touchdown on a 60-yard punt return.

Crawford had been selected in the first round (24th pick) of the 1984 NFL Supplemental Draft of USFL and CFL players by the San Francisco 49ers and signed with the team after the USFL folded in 1986. He played one season for the team, catching five passes for 70 yards.

Crawford returned to professional football in 1990 when he joined the Calgary Stampeders of the Canadian Football League (CFL). In 1992, Crawford had 47 receptions for 714 yards and five touchdowns in the regular season was the leading receiver with 162 yards in the Stampeders 80th Grey Cup victory. After sitting out the 1994 season Crawford was signed by the Birmingham Barracudas, formed as part of the CFL's attempted expansion into the United States, in 1995.
