= 1990 Ottawa Rough Riders season =

Canadian football team season

- Head coach: Steve Goldman
- Home stadium: Frank Clair Stadium

Results
- Record: 7–11
- Division place: 3rd, East
- Playoffs: Lost East Semi-Final

Uniform

The 1990 Ottawa Rough Riders finished third place in the East Division with a 7–11 record. They were defeated in the East Semi-Final by the Toronto Argonauts.

== Offseason ==
=== CFL draft ===
Rd	Pick	Player	Position	School
4	25	Michael Philbrick	DE	Carlton
5	33	Al Neufeld	OG	Saskatchewan
6	41	Cam Sackschewsky	OG/OT	Calgary
6	48	Brett Wilson	WR	Ottawa
7	49	Jamie Coombs	DL/OG	Carleton
7	56	Hagen Mehnart	LB	McGill
8	57	Darryl Forde	CB/DB	Western Ontario
8	64	Mike Koladich	LB	Western Ontario

=== Preseason ===
Game	Date	Opponent	Results		Venue	Attendance
Game	Date	Opponent	Score	Record	Venue	Attendance
A	June 29	at Saskatchewan Roughriders	W 26–23	1–0		20,142
B	July 4	vs. Toronto Argonauts	L 30–43	1–1		19,672

== Regular season ==
=== Season standings ===
East Division
Pos	Team	Pld	W	L	T	PF	PA	PD	Pts	Div	Stk
1	Winnipeg Blue Bombers (C, Q)	18	12	6	0	472	398	74	24	7–3	W1
2	Toronto Argonauts (Q)	18	10	8	0	689	538	151	20	6–4	W1
3	Ottawa Rough Riders (Q)	18	7	11	0	540	602	−62	14	3–7	L1
4	Hamilton Tiger-Cats	18	6	12	0	476	628	−152	12	4–6	L3

Source: "CFL.ca - Official Site of the Canadian Football League". Archived from the original on 2009-12-15.
(C) First round bye; (Q) Qualified for playoffs

=== Schedule ===
Week	Game	Date	Opponent	Results		Venue	Attendance
Week	Game	Date	Opponent	Score	Record	Venue	Attendance
1	1	July 12	vs. Winnipeg Blue Bombers	L 26–31 (OT)	0–1		22,911
2	2	July 19	at Hamilton Tiger-Cats	L 26–29	0–2		13,087
3	3	July 26	vs. Edmonton Eskimos	W 50–46	1–2		26,411
4	4	Aug 4	at Toronto Argonauts	L 26–30	1–3		28,333
5	5	Aug 9	vs. Hamilton Tiger-Cats	L 30–31	1–4		26,684
6	6	Aug 16	vs. Toronto Argonauts	L 25–41	1–5		27,591
7	7	Aug 22	at Calgary Stampeders	L 31–34	1–6		20,311
8	8	Aug 28	vs. BC Lions	W 41–34	2–6		22,450
9	9	Sept 3	at Hamilton Tiger-Cats	W 40–17	3–6		20,330
10	10	Sept 9	vs. Saskatchewan Roughriders	W 30–21	4–6		25,384
11	11	Sept 16	at Saskatchewan Roughriders	L 19–45	4–7		27,822
12	12	Sept 21	at Edmonton Eskimos	L 29–41	4–8		30,109
13	13	Sept 30	vs. Calgary Stampeders	L 8–52	4–9		20,035
14	14	Oct 6	at BC Lions	W 42–26	5–9		27,905
15	15	Oct 14	vs. Hamilton Tiger-Cats	L 33–37	5–10		23,139
16	16	Oct 21	at Winnipeg Blue Bombers	W 26–20	6–10		27,323
17	17	Oct 28	vs. Winnipeg Blue Bombers	W 27–18	7–10		18,216
18	18	Nov 3	at Toronto Argonauts	L 30–49	7–11		36,321

== Postseason ==
Round	Date	Opponent	Results		Venue	Attendance
Round	Date	Opponent	Score	Record	Venue	Attendance
East Semi-Final	Nov 11	Toronto Argonauts	L 25–34	0–1		24,427

== Roster ==
1990 Ottawa Rough Riders final roster
Quarterbacks: 9 Damon Allen; 3 Ken Hobart; 1 Tony Kimbrough; Running backs: 19 Reggie Barnes; 25 David Conrad; 34 Shawn Daniels; 23 Jed Tommy; Receivers: 84 Stacey Dawsey; 85 James Ellingson; 16 Dan Johnston; 89 Stephen Jones; 8 Cornelius Redick; 82 Jeff Smith; 4 David Williams; 87 Gerald Wilcox	Offensive linemen: 54 Irv Daymond C; 61 Bryan Illerbrun T; 56 Michel Lamy G; 65 Gerald Roper G; 58 Rob Smith T; 55 Brad Tierney G; 69 Kari Yli-Renko T; Defensive linemen: 73 John Kropke DT; 68 Glenn Kulka DE; 79 Mike Lambrecht DT; 76 Loyd Lewis DT; 75 John Mandarich DT; 74 Rob Prodanovic DE; 45 Greg Stumon DE; Special teams: 10 Terry Baker P; 2 Dean Dorsey K	Linebackers: 49 Frank Balkovec; 53 Bruce Holmes; 36 Brent Lewis; 29 Paul McGowan; 44 Brian Warren; 35 Pat Wayne; 43 Gord Weber; Defensive backs: 14 Scott Flagel; 15 Sean Foudy; 30 Kyle Hall; 27 Daniel Hunter; 18 Ian Patterson; 26 Troy Wilson; 39 Charlie Wright; 21 Brett Young; Italics indicate International player
