= 1990 Hamilton Tiger-Cats season =

Season of Canadian Football League team the Hamilton Tiger-Cats

- Head coach: Al Bruno; David Beckman
- Home stadium: Ivor Wynne Stadium

Results
- Record: 6–12
- Division place: 4th, East
- Playoffs: did not qualify
- Team MOP: Earl Winfield
- Team MOC: Paul Osbaldiston
- Team MOR: Bobby Dawson

Uniform

The 1990 Hamilton Tiger-Cats season was the 33rd season for the team in the Canadian Football League (CFL) and their 41st overall. The Tiger-Cats finished in fourth place in the East Division with a 6–12 record and failed to make the playoffs for the first time since 1977.

== Offseason ==
=== CFL draft ===
Round	Pick	Player	Position	School
1	7	Mark Dennis	LB	Central Michigan
3	23	Richard Nurse	WR/DB	Canisius
4	31	Kevin King	DB/LB	Simon Fraser
5	39	Scott Douglas	OL	Western Ontario
6	47	John Monaco	TB/SB	Canisius
7	55	Jeff Martens	OL/DT	Alberta
8	63	Mike Raymond	FB	York

== Preseason ==
Game	Date	Opponent	Results		Venue	Attendance
Game	Date	Opponent	Score	Record	Venue	Attendance
B	June 28	at Toronto Argonauts	L 19–60	0–1	SkyDome	
C	July 3	vs. Calgary Stampeders	W 28–27	1–1	Ivor Wynne Stadium	

== Regular season ==
=== Season standings ===
East Division
Pos	Team	Pld	W	L	T	PF	PA	PD	Pts	Div	Stk
1	Winnipeg Blue Bombers (C, Q)	18	12	6	0	472	398	74	24	7–3	W1
2	Toronto Argonauts (Q)	18	10	8	0	689	538	151	20	6–4	W1
3	Ottawa Rough Riders (Q)	18	7	11	0	540	602	−62	14	3–7	L1
4	Hamilton Tiger-Cats	18	6	12	0	476	628	−152	12	4–6	L3

Source: "CFL.ca - Official Site of the Canadian Football League". Archived from the original on 2009-12-15.
(C) First round bye; (Q) Qualified for playoffs

=== Season schedule ===
Week	Game	Date	Opponent	Result	Record
1	1	July 12	at Saskatchewan Roughriders	L 35–38	0–1
2	2	July 19	vs. Ottawa Rough Riders	W 29–26	1–1
3	3	July 28	vs. Toronto Argonauts	L 29–41	1–2
4	4	Aug 3	at Calgary Stampeders	L 35–40	1–3
5	5	Aug 9	at Ottawa Rough Riders	W 31–30	2–3
6	6	Aug 15	vs. Winnipeg Blue Bombers	W 20–10	3–3
6	7	Aug 20	at BC Lions	W 36–34	4–3
7	8	Aug 25	vs. Saskatchewan Roughriders	L 33–46	4–4
8	9	Sept 3	vs. Ottawa Rough Riders	L 17–40	4–5
9	10	Sept 9	at Winnipeg Blue Bombers	L 18–29	4–6
10	11	Sept 15	vs. Toronto Argonauts	L 16–39	4–7
11	12	Sept 22	vs. BC Lions	L 4–34	4–8
12	13	Sept 29	at Toronto Argonauts	L 39–60	4–9
13	14	Oct 8	vs. Edmonton Eskimos	W 25–23	5–9
14	15	Oct 14	at Ottawa Rough Riders	W 37–33	6–9
15	16	Oct 21	vs. Calgary Stampeders	L 42–48	6–10
16	17	Oct 28	at Edmonton Eskimos	L 15–25	6–11
17	18	Nov 4	at Winnipeg Blue Bombers	L 15–32	6–12

== Roster ==
1990 Hamilton Tiger-Cats final roster
Quarterbacks: 19 Todd Dillon; 2 Mike Kerrigan; Running backs: 32 Sam Loucks; 19 Derrick McAdoo; 34 Ernie Schramayr; 24 Michael Vaughn; Wide receivers: 87 Tony Champion; 89 Richard Estell; 17 Ken Evraire; 85 Richard Nurse; 80 Mark Waterman; 1 Earl Winfield; 21 Wally Zatylny; Tight ends: 23 Rocky Dipietro; 25 Lee Knight	Offensive linemen: 68 Mike Derks T; 66 Miles Gorrell T; 63 Darrell Harle G; 51 David Richardson T; 56 Jason Riley G; 52 Rae Robirtis C; 56 Dale Sanderson C/T; 67 Ralph Scholz G; Defensive linemen: 93 Romel Andrews DT; 77 Grover Covington DE; 62 Ronnie Glanton DT; 64 Tim Lorenz DE; 79 Mark Napiorkowski DT; 37 Dan Sellers DE; 59 Rod Skillman DT	Linebackers: 41 Pete Buchanan; 38 Darrell Corbin; 49 Mark Dennis; 90 Pete Giftopoulos; 44 John O'Brien; 30 Lance Trumble; 35 John Zajdel; Defensive backs: 27 Bobby Dawson; 18 Sonny Gordon; 12 Stephen Jordan; 22 Dave Mossman; 6 Jim Rockford; 7 Floyd Salazar; 8 Albert Thomas; 20 Gary Wilkerson; Special teams: 3 Paul Osbaldiston K/P; Italics indicate American players
