= Donald Crump =

Canadian sports executive (1933–2011)

Commissioner of the Canadian Football League
- In office January 1990 – December 1991
- Preceded by: Roy McMurtry
- Succeeded by: Phil Kershaw

Personal details
- Born: John Donald Crump; March 30, 1933 Toronto, Ontario, Canada
- Died: May 5, 2011 (aged 78) Newmarket, Ontario, Canada
- Occupation: Accountant

John Donald Crump (March 30, 1933 – May 5, 2011) was the seventh commissioner of the Canadian Football League from January 1990 to December 1991. During the previous two decades he had worked for Harold Ballard as an executive of the Hamilton Tiger-Cats and financial officer of Maple Leaf Gardens.

Crump was born in Toronto and played football, hockey and basketball as a kid. He began his career as a chartered accountant in 1958 with a government position at the National Revenue Department.

Crump joined Maple Leaf Gardens in 1971 as an accountant and was named the seventh commissioner in CFL history in January 1990, replacing President and Chief Executive Officer, Bill Baker.

Crump died in 2011 at age 78 at the Southlake Regional Health Centre in Newmarket, Ontario.
