= Michael Lazecki =

Canadian football player (1965-2003)

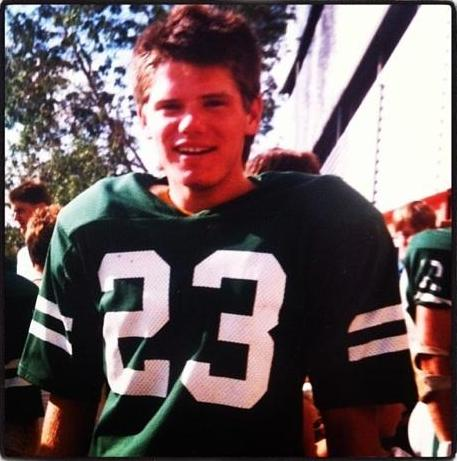
Michael Lazecki with the Regina Rams

Michael Charles Lazecki (February 8, 1965 – January 30, 2003) was a Canadian football player who was a punter and kicker in the Canadian Football League (CFL) in the early 1990s and a kicker for the Tampa Bay Storm in the Arena Football League (AFL). Lazecki died in an automobile accident on a rural highway in southern Manitoba in January 2003 at the age of 37.

== Early years ==
Lazecki was born and raised in Regina, Saskatchewan. His father, Morris, was a school teacher, guidance counselor, and principal, and his mother, Doris, was the executive director of the Saskatchewan Music Festival Association. His siblings are Beverly (1959), Laurie (1961), and Douglas (1963). Lazecki began concentrating on playing football shortly after he entered high school at Campbell Collegiate in south Regina.

== Junior and University Career ==
After completing high school in 1983, Lazecki played junior football with the Regina Rams (formerly of the Canadian Junior Football League (CJFL)) for three years under coach Frank McCrystal, with the Rams winning the Canadian Junior Football Championship in 1986. Lazecki attended evaluation camps for the Saskatchewan Roughriders in 1987 and 1988, and then was drafted and signed by the Calgary Stampeders in 1989. That year, he chose to enroll at the University of Saskatchewan to play with the Huskies, where he played one season on the team that were Vanier Cup finalists.

== Professional career ==
Lazecki’s rights were obtained from Calgary by the Ottawa Rough Riders, but in 1990 he, defensive lineman Scott Campbell, and cornerback Charles McCree were dealt to the Saskatchewan Roughriders for punter Terry Baker. Lazecki played for the western Riders for the entire 1990 and 1991 seasons. While Lazecki’s duties were mainly that of punter, he also served as the backup for Saskatchewan’s kicker, Dave Ridgway. Midway through the 1992 season, Lazecki was released by the Riders. Because Ottawa Rough Riders’ kicker/punter Paul McCallum was only averaging 34.1 yards per kick, Lazecki was signed by the team in 1993, the last season he would play in the CFL.

== The Naked Punter ==
Paul McCallum told The Ottawa Citizen this story about the first time he and Lazecki met after Lazecki was signed by the Ottawa Rough Riders in 1993:

“My first meeting with Mike, and people who know him will appreciate this, he walked in the door and stood basically at the entrance of the room and he’s talking to me, and, as he’s talking to me, he’s disrobing, taking off his clothes,” McCallum says. “Basically, I’m in there and I’ve been watching TV for an hour, doing whatever, and he walks in. ‘Hey, how’s it going? I’m the punter,’ and then he’s taking his clothes off. I just looked at him and, quite frankly, I go, ‘What the —- are you doing?’ He says, ‘I’m going to the washroom.’ And I said, ‘Well, go.’ And he says, ‘I can’t go to the washroom if I have any clothes on.’ “So, he proceeds to get buck naked and goes into the washroom, leaves the door open, was talking to me from the washroom, does his things, comes out of the washroom, puts his clothes back on, standing in the same place he dropped them, gets dressed, then says, ‘OK, I’m going down to the lobby to grab a drink. You need anything?’”

== Tampa Bay Storm ==
In 1994, Lazecki tried out for the position of kicker for the Tampa Bay Storm of the Arena Football League (AFL), where he played the entire season. At the conclusion of that season, Lazecki retired from professional football.

== Death ==
On the afternoon of Thursday, January 30, 2003, while working as a contractor for an agricultural service company, Lazecki was driving a car on Highway 59, a single-lane highway, in rural Manitoba, near St. Pierre-Jolys, MB, when a driver from the other direction crossed the center line and collided with his car, hitting the driver’s side door, killing him instantly.

Upon hearing of his death, former junior coach Frank McCrystal said:

"I never heard anybody say a bad thing about him," McCrystal said. "He had a way of being happy no matter what was going on in his life. When we were at practice, he used to go over to the other field," referring to the park adjacent to the Rams' practice facility. "We thought he was kicking, but he was actually playing cards with a little kid who used to hang around out there. I think it was more important to Mike to be part of a team than to kick or play. I think that was his motivation."

Mike Lazecki Rams Memorial Award

In the Fall of 2003, the University of Regina Rams established the “Mike Lazecki Rams Memorial Award”, a $500.00 CAN scholarship given annually to the most valuable "Special Teams" player designated by the football program.
