= Jay Macias =

American football player (born 1973)

No. 16
- Position: Quarterback

Personal information
- Born: August 10, 1973 (age 53); Los Angeles, California, U.S.
- Listed height: 6 ft 2 in (1.88 m)
- Listed weight: 195 lb (88 kg)

Career information
- High school: Schurr (Montebello, California)
- College: Wisconsin
- NFL draft: 1995: undrafted

Career history
- Ottawa Rough Riders (1995)

Jerome J. Macias (born August 10, 1973) is an American former professional football quarterback who played for the Ottawa Rough Riders of the Canadian Football League (CFL). He played college football at Wisconsin.

== Early life ==
Jerome J. Macias was born on August 10, 1973, in Los Angeles, California. He attended Schurr High School in Montebello, California.

== College career ==
Macias was a four-year letterman for the Wisconsin Badgers from 1991 to 1994. He played in eight games, starting six after Tony Lowery was benched, as a freshman in 1991. Macias finished the year completing 54 of 117 passes (46.2%) for 585 yards, three touchdowns, and four interceptions. After only completing five passes for 91 yards against No. 2 ranked Washington on September 14, 1992, Macias was benched for the rest of the season in favor of Darrell Bevell. Macias remained a backup in 1993, only attempting seven passes all season. After Bevell suffered an injury in early October 1994, Macias took over as starter again. Overall in 1994, he completed 42 of 75 passes (56.0%) for 605 yards, three touchdowns, and five interceptions.

== Professional career ==
After going undrafted in the 1995 NFL draft, Macias signed with the Ottawa Rough Riders of the Canadian Football League. He dressed in all 18 games, starting three, for the Rough Riders in 1995, completing 58 of 128 passes (45.3%) for 881 yards, two touchdowns, and seven interceptions. He was released on June 21, 1996.
