= Greg Peterson (Canadian football) =

Canadian gridiron football player (born 1960)

Profile
- Position: Defensive back

Personal information
- Born: February 18, 1960 (age 66); Calgary, Alberta, Canada

Career information
- College: Brigham Young

Career history
- 1984–1992: Calgary Stampeders

Awards and highlights
- Grey Cup champion (1992); CFL All-Star (1990); CFL West All-Star (1990)

Gregory Peterson (born February 18, 1960) is a Canadian former gridiron football player who played in the Canadian Football League (CFL) for nine years. Peterson played defensive back for the Calgary Stampeders from 1984 to 1992. He was part of the Stampeders 1992 Grey Cup winning team. Peterson was an All-Star in 1990. He played college football at Brigham Young University and high school football at Dr. E.P. Scarlett.

Following retirement in 1993, Peterson began a career in law, and is currently a partner at law firm Gowlings, specialising in business law. Peterson has been the QR radio Stampeder radio colour commentator since 1996, and president of the Greater Calgary Amateur Football Association.

He is the brother of NHL player and coach Brent Peterson.
