= Troy Wilson (defensive back) =

American football player (born 1965)

No. 26, 41
- Position: Defensive back

Personal information
- Born: September 19, 1965 (age 61); San Antonio, Texas, U.S.
- Listed height: 5 ft 10 in (1.78 m)
- Listed weight: 170 lb (77 kg)

Career information
- High school: Thomas Johnson
- College: Notre Dame
- NFL draft: 1987: undrafted

Career history
- Cleveland Browns (1987); Ottawa Rough Riders (1987–1990)

Awards and highlights
- CFL All-Star (1990)

Career NFL statistics
- Interceptions: 1
- Stats at Pro Football Reference

Troy Anthony Wilson (born September 19, 1965) is an American former professional football player who was a defensive back in the Canadian Football League (CFL) for the Ottawa Rough Riders. He played college football for the Notre Dame Fighting Irish. He also played in the National Football League (NFL) for the Cleveland Browns.
