= Greg Battle =

American gridiron football player (born 1964)

No. 34
- Position: Linebacker

Personal information
- Born: April 14, 1964 (age 62); Long Beach, California, U.S.

Career information
- High school: Los Angeles (CA) Banning
- College: Arizona State

Career history
- 1987–1993: Winnipeg Blue Bombers
- 1994: Las Vegas Posse
- 1994: Ottawa Rough Riders
- 1995: Memphis Mad Dogs
- 1996: Saskatchewan Roughriders
- 1997–1998: Winnipeg Blue Bombers

Awards and highlights
- 2× Grey Cup champion (1988, 1990); Grey Cup MVP (1990); 3× James P. McCaffrey Trophy (1989-1991); 2× CFL All-Star (1990, 1991); 2× CFL East All-Star (1990, 1991); Second-team All-Pac-10 (1985)
- Canadian Football Hall of Fame (Class of 2007)

Greg Battle (born April 14, 1964) is an American former professional football linebacker who played in the Canadian Football League (CFL).

He graduated from Arizona State University. He had a tryout with the Denver Broncos of the NFL but turned north to Canada in 1987.

He won two CFL Outstanding Defensive player awards in his career, 1990 and 1991, and helped the Winnipeg Blue Bombers to two Grey Cup victories in 1988 and 1990. He finished his career third in the CFL for career defensive tackles with 766. He was named one of the All-Time Blue Bomber Greats. As a senior, Battle accumulated 147 tackles and took home Honorable Mention All-America honors from the Associated Press. He was chosen the Eastern Division outstanding defensive player three times (1989, 1990 and 1991) and the CFL's top defensive player in 1990 and 1991. He was named the Grey Cup's defensive MVP in 1990, when he recorded four tackles and two interceptions, returning one for a 56-yard touchdown in a 50–11 victory over the Edmonton Eskimos. During the game one sports caster jokingly asked if he could nominate Battle for most outstanding offensive player due to his interceptions. During his time in the CFL he was known for his Pass coverage skills, and outstanding speed.

Battle also briefly played for the Las Vegas Posse in 1994 and the Ottawa Rough Riders in the same season, the Memphis Mad Dogs in 1995 and the Saskatchewan Roughriders in 1996 before returning to the Blue Bombers for his two final seasons.

In 2007, Battle was inducted into the Canadian Football Hall of Fame.
