= Warren Hudson =

Canadian Football League player (1962–2012)

No. 25
- Position: Fullback

Personal information
- Born: May 25, 1962; Scarborough, Ontario, Canada
- Died: February 16, 2012 (aged 49); Oakville, Ontario, Canada

Career history
- 1985–1989: Toronto Argonauts
- 1990–1992: Winnipeg Blue Bombers
- 1993: Toronto Argonauts

Awards and highlights
- Grey Cup champion (1990); Dick Suderman Trophy (1990); 2× CFL East All-Star (1990, 1992)

Warren Hudson (May 25, 1962 – February 16, 2012) was a player in the Canadian Football League (CFL). He was the Grey Cup's Most Valuable Canadian in 1990. He died of brain cancer on February 16, 2012, at age 49.
