= Andre Francis =

Jamaican gridiron football player (born 1961)

Profile
- Position: Defensive back

Personal information
- Born: 5 October 1961 (age 65); Kingston, Jamaica

Career information
- College: New Mexico State

Career history
- 1983–1985: Montreal Concordes (CFL)
- 1985: Saskatchewan Roughriders (CFL)
- 1986–1988: British Columbia Lions (CFL)
- 1989–1990: Edmonton Eskimos (CFL)
- 1991, 1994: Ottawa Rough Riders (CFL)
- 1992–1993: British Columbia Lions (CFL)

Awards and highlights
- CFL West All Star - 1989 & 1990

Andre Francis (born 5 October 1961 in Kingston, Jamaica) is a former cornerback in the Canadian Football League for eleven years. He played college football at New Mexico State University. He wore the number one. Francis was selected to the British Columbia Lions' 2004 50th Anniversary Dream Team.

He intercepted 51 passes for 951 yards and 4 touchdowns in his career, and was a 2 time West all-star.
