= Blake Marshall =

Canadian football player (born 1965)

No. 22
- Position: Running back

Personal information
- Born: May 17, 1965 (age 61); Guelph, Ontario, Canada
- Listed height: 6 ft 1 in (1.85 m)
- Listed weight: 230 lb (104 kg)

Career information
- University: Western Ontario
- CFL draft: 1987: 1st round, 2nd overall pick

Career history
- 1987–1993: Edmonton Eskimos

Awards and highlights
- 2× Grey Cup champion (1987, 1993); CFL's Most Outstanding Canadian Award (1991); Dr. Beattie Martin Trophy (1991); 3× CFL All-Star (1990, 1991, 1992); 3× CFL West All-Star (1990, 1991, 1992); Hec Crighton Trophy (1986); Eskimos record, most touchdowns –season (20) - 1991

Blake Marshall (born May 17, 1965) is a Canadian former professional football player with the Edmonton Eskimos for 8 seasons. He won the CFL's Most Outstanding Canadian Award in 1991 when he tied a CFL record with 20 total touchdowns and was a CFL All-Star three years in a row.

He resides in London, Ontario and owns a pasta restaurant in North London. He is the brother of Greg Marshall.
