= Tom Burgess (Canadian football) =

American gridiron football player (born 1964)

No. 16, 13, 12
- Position: Quarterback

Personal information
- Born: March 6, 1964 (age 62); Newark, New York, U.S.
- Listed height: 6 ft 0 in (1.83 m)
- Listed weight: 195 lb (88 kg)

Career information
- College: Colgate University

Career history
- 1986: Ottawa Rough Riders
- 1987–1989: Saskatchewan Roughriders
- 1990–1991: Winnipeg Blue Bombers
- 1992–1993: Ottawa Rough Riders
- 1994–1995: Saskatchewan Roughriders

Awards and highlights
- 2× Grey Cup champion (1989, 1990); 1990 Grey Cup MVP (Offence); 2× CFL East All-Star (1990, 1992)

Tom Burgess (born March 6, 1964) is an American former all-star quarterback in the Canadian Football League (CFL).

== College career ==
Burgess was a graduate of Colgate University, playing from 1982 to 1985, and was inducted into the Colgate University Athletic Hall of Honor in 1986. As a senior on the 1985 squad, he was named honorable mention Associated Press All-American after setting 14 school records in passing and total offense. He finished ninth in the nation in total offense with 266.1 yards per game. Burgess also received Colgate's Andy Kerr Trophy, given annually to the squad's most valuable offensive player. He threw for a school-record 2,565 yards in 1985 and gained a school-record 2,927 yards of total offense.

== Professional career ==
=== Ottawa Rough Riders (I) ===
In March 1986, Burgess was signed as a free agent by the Ottawa Rough Riders.

=== Saskatchewan Roughriders (I) ===
In April 1987, he was traded to the Saskatchewan Roughriders for quarterback Joe Paopao.

In 1988, Burgess was the starting quarterback for the Roughriders when they lost the West Semi-Final 42–18 to the BC Lions.

In 1989, he was instrumental in the Roughriders playoff run for their 1989 Grey Cup victory. Burgess was part of a quarterback tandem with Kent Austin. Burgess defeated the 16-2 Edmonton Eskimos in the 1989 CFL Western Final replacing an injured Austin who would return to start and win the 1989 Grey Cup. Both quarterbacks were capable starters and Burgess requested a trade in the off-season to pursue a full-time starting opportunity.

=== Winnipeg Blue Bombers ===
In July 1990, Burgess was traded to the Winnipeg Blue Bombers. He was nominated the East Division All-Star quarterback. He quarterbacked the Blue Bombers to a Grey Cup win in 1990. Burgess was named the Grey Cup's Most Valuable Player on Offence of the 78th Grey Cup.

In 1991, Burgess had his first 4000 yard passing season. Winnipeg was hosting its first Grey Cup. Burgess guided Winnipeg to the East Final, but the team lost 42–3 to the eventual Grey Cup champion Toronto Argonauts.

Burgess was granted free agency status in February 1992.

=== Ottawa Rough Riders (II) ===
In May 1992, Burgess was signed as a free agent by the Ottawa Rough Riders, his second stint with the team. He was nominated the East Division All-Star quarterback for the second time in his career.

In 1993, he enjoyed a 5,000 yard, 30 TD passing season.

=== Saskatchewan Roughriders (II) ===
In March 1994, Burgess was traded to the Saskatchewan Roughriders, his second stint with the team. Saskatchewan finished 11-7 and lost in the West Semi-Final to Calgary 36-3.

In 1995, Saskatchewan was hosting its first Grey Cup. Unfortunately, the Roughriders were unable to qualify for the playoffs.

Burgess was released by Saskatchewan in May 1996.

He was inducted into the Saskatchewan Roughrider Plaza of Honor in 2009.

== CFL career statistics ==
=== Regular season ===
Year	Team	GP	GS	ATT	COMP	YD	TD	INT	RUSH	YD	TD
1986	OTT	18		199	95	1,199	5	12	26	113	0
1987	SSK	10		243	127	1,691	7	14	26	114	1
1988	SSK	18		331	159	2,575	19	14	61	249	3
1989	SSK	18		342	162	2,540	22	18	48	209	0
1990	WPG	18		574	330	3,958	25	27	70	260	0
1991	WPG	18		525	261	4,212	27	29	73	326	0
1992	OTT	18		511	276	4,026	29	24	68	348	5
1993	OTT	18		591	329	5,063	30	25	75	347	3
1994	SSK	18		450	243	3,442	19	14	51	188	6
1995	SSK	18		268	136	1,602	7	14	30	86	1
Totals		172		4,034	2,118	30,308	190	191	528	2,240	19

=== Playoffs ===
Year & game	Team	GP	GS	ATT	COMP	YD	TD	INT	RUSH	YD	TD
1988 West Semi-Final	SSK	1	1	42	20	276	1	1	8	30	0
1989 West Semi-Final	SSK	1	0	0	-	-	-	-	0	-	-
1989 West Final	SSK	1	0	12	9	120	2	0	7	8	0
1990 East Final	WPG	1	1	40	24	230	1	1	7	49	0
1991 East Semi-Final	WPG	1	1	26	12	132	1	1	5	30	0
1991 East Final	WPG	1	1	14	3	39	0	2	3	8	0
1992 East Semi-Final	OTT	1	1	22	12	161	1	0	6	21	0
1993 East Semi-Final	OTT	1	1	42	25	338	1	0	4	11	0
1994 West Semi-Final	SSK	1	1	20	8	99	0	1	4	37	0
Totals		9	7	218	113	1,395	7	6	44	194	0

=== Grey Cup ===
Year	Team	GP	GS	ATT	COMP	YD	TD	INT	RUSH	YD	TD
1989	SSK	1	0	0	-	-	-	-	0	-	-
1990	WPG	1	1	31	18	286	3	0	7	26	0
Totals		2	1	31	18	286	3	0	7	26	0
