= Rick House =

Canadian football player (born 1957)

No. 31, 33, 39
- Position: Slotback

Personal information
- Born: May 18, 1957 (age 69); Burnaby, British Columbia, Canada

Career information
- University: Simon Fraser University

Career history
- 1979–1984: Winnipeg Blue Bombers
- 1985–1988: Edmonton Eskimos
- 1989–1991: Winnipeg Blue Bombers

Awards and highlights
- 3× Grey Cup champion (1984, 1987, 1990); Dr. Beattie Martin Trophy (1982); CFL East All-Star (1990)

Rick House (born May 18, 1957) is a Canadian former professional football player who was a receiver for the Winnipeg Blue Bombers of the Canadian Football League (CFL) from 1979 to 1984 and 1989 to 1991. He also played for the Edmonton Eskimos. He won two Grey Cups with the Bombers, in 1984 and 1990, in addition to one with the Eskimos in 1987. He was selected as one of the Blue Bombers All-Time Greats being inducted into the Winnipeg Blue Bomber Hall of Fame. He now lives in Winnipeg, Manitoba with wife Joanie House, and their three sons Mitchell, Bradley, and Jeff.
