= Don Wilson (gridiron football) =

American gridiron football player (born 1961)

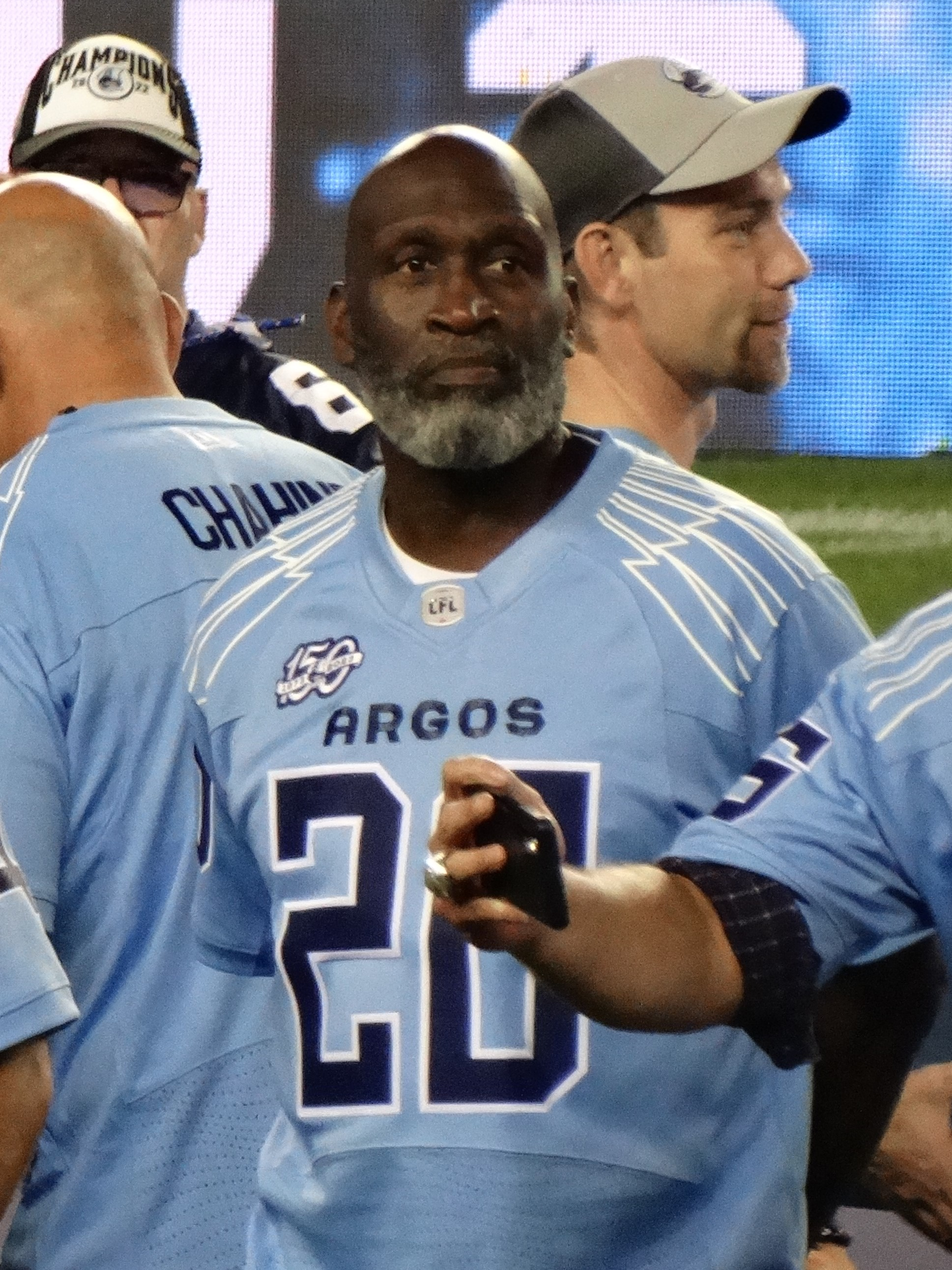
- Wilson in 2023

No. 20
- Positions: Defensive back, Punt returner

Personal information
- Born: July 28, 1961 (age 65); Washington, D.C., U.S.
- Listed height: 6 ft 2 in (1.88 m)
- Listed weight: 190 lb (86 kg)

Career information
- College: North Carolina State

Career history
- 1984–1985: Buffalo Bills
- 1987–1989: Edmonton Eskimos
- 1990–1992: Toronto Argonauts
- 1993–1994: Edmonton Eskimos
- 1995–1996: Toronto Argonauts
- 1997: BC Lions
- 1998: Edmonton Eskimos

Awards and highlights
- 4× Grey Cup champion (1987, 1991, 1993, 1996); 4× CFL All-Star (1989, 1990, 1991, 1993); 2× CFL East All-Star (1990, 1991); 2× CFL West All-Star (1989, 1993)

Career CFL statistics
- Games played: 197
- Def Tackles: 667
- Interceptions: 61
- Int Ret Yards: 1,046
- Touchdowns: 8
- Stats at Pro Football Reference
- Canadian Football Hall of Fame (Class of 2021)

Donald Allen Wilson (born July 28, 1961) is a former professional gridiron football defensive back. Playing collegiately for North Carolina State University, he played in the National Football League for the Buffalo Bills (1984–1985). He then played in the Canadian Football League for twelve years with the Edmonton Eskimos (1987–1989, 1993–1994, 1998), the Toronto Argonauts (1990–1992, 1995–1996), and the BC Lions (1997). He was named to the Argonauts all-time team in 2007.

He was inducted into the Canadian Football Hall of Fame as a player in 2021.
