= 78th Grey Cup =

1990 Canadian Football championship game

| Winnipeg Blue Bombers | Edmonton Eskimos |
|---|---|
| (12–6) | (10–8) |
| 50 | 11 |
| Head coach: Mike Riley | Head coach: Joe Faragalli |
| | 1 | 2 | 3 | 4 | Total |
|---|---|---|---|---|---|
| Winnipeg Blue Bombers | 10 | 0 | 28 | 12 | 50 |
| Edmonton Eskimos | 0 | 4 | 0 | 7 | 11 |
- Date: November 25, 1990
- Stadium: BC Place Stadium
- Location: Vancouver
- Most Valuable Player: Offence: Tom Burgess, QB (Blue Bombers); Defence: Greg Battle, LB (Blue Bombers)
- Most Valuable Canadian: Warren Hudson, FB (Blue Bombers)
- National anthem: Michael Burgess
- Referee: Jake Ireland
- Halftime show: Esmeralda Colombian Dance Group Mlada Srbadia Serbian Folk Dance Group Joy of Movement Studio Yuen's Institute of Tae Kwon-do Hungarian Csardas Dancers of Vancouver
- Attendance: 46,968

Broadcasters
- Network: CBC, Canadian Football Network, SRC
- Announcers: CBC: Don Wittman, Ron Lancaster, Brian Williams, Steve Armitage. CFN: Bob Irving, Neil Lumsden, Nick Bastaja, Dave Hodge, Tom Larscheid. SRC: N/A.

The 78th Grey Cup was the 1990 Canadian Football League championship game played between the Winnipeg Blue Bombers and the Edmonton Eskimos at BC Place Stadium in Vancouver, British Columbia. The Blue Bombers defeated the Eskimos, 50–11.

== Game summary ==
Winnipeg Blue Bombers (50) – TDs, Warren Hudson (2), Lee Hull, Greg Battle, Perry Tuttle, Rick House; FGs, Trevor Kennerd (2); cons., Kennerd (6), safety touch.

Edmonton Eskimos (11) – TDs, Larry Willis; FGs Ray Macoritti; cons., Macoritti; single, Macoritti.

First quarter
WPG – FG Kennerd 14 yards
WPG – TD Hull 11 yard pass from Burgess (Kennerd convert)

Second quarter
EDM – Single Macoritti 56 yard punt
EDM – FG Macoritti 37 yards

Third quarter
WPG – TD Battle 34 yard interception return (Kennerd convert)
WPG – TD Tuttle 5 yard pass from Burgess (Kennerd convert)
WPG – TD Hudson 18 yard pass from Burgess (Kennerd convert)
WPG – TD Hudson 2 yard run (Kennerd convert)

Fourth quarter
EDM – TD Willis 20 yard pass from Ham (Macoritti convert)
WPG – Safety West tackle on Ham
WPG – FG Kennerd 14 yards
WPG – TD House 56 yard pass from McManus (Kennerd convert)

Edmonton started using a receiver formation known as the "five-pack" which had been very effective in the Western final. Quarterback Tracy Ham drove Edmonton from their own 32 yard line to the Winnipeg 16. After a procedure penalty, Ham's pass was intercepted by Greg Battle at the 1 yard line and returned to the Edmonton 43. Bomber quarterback Tom Burgess led his team to the Edmonton 14 yard line, but could not score the touchdown, as his pass was nearly intercepted by Brett "The Toaster" Williams. Trevor Kennard kicked a 14-yard field goal.

Edmonton's Blake Marshall fumbled on the Eskimo 45. The Bombers scored a touchdown on this drive, moving to the 11 where Burgess hit Lee Hull on an end-zone pattern.

At the end of the quarter Winnipeg running back Robert Mimbs fumbled, giving Edmonton possession on their own 43 yard line. They were unable to benefit from this opportunity and scored a 56-yard single on Ray Macoritti's punt. Neither offence was able to mount a sustained drive until the end of the quarter, when Ham got the Eskimos to the Bomber 37 yard line. They had to settle for a Macoritti field goal on the last play of the half, making the halftime score 10-4.

Early in the second half, Greg Battle made his second interception and returned it 34 yards for a touchdown. Edmonton's offence could not move the ball and had to punt. Burgess completed a 55-yard pass to Perry Tuttle who was tackled on the Edmonton 5. Two plays later Tuttle made a fingertip shoestring catch at the goal line for the touchdown. Edmonton's next series came to a halt when Eskimo receiver Craig Ellis fumbled after a pass reception and Ken Hailey recovered. The Bombers were unable to advance and punted. Edmonton punt returner Henry "The Gizmo" Williams was stripped of the ball at the Edmonton 18 yard line and Bombers' Tyrone Jones recovered. On the next play Burgess completed a pass to fullback Warren Hudson who dodged several tackles to score.

Winnipeg were close to scoring again when Edmonton was called for pass interference at their four-yard line. Warren Hudson ran in the touchdown at the end of the quarter.

Tracy Ham was able to get his team moving to start the fourth quarter, driving to the Winnipeg 20 yard line. His pass into the end zone was tipped by Less Browne but caught by Larry Willis for the touchdown.

Later, Ham was sacked by James "Wild" West for a safety.

Burgess put together another drive, including a pass to Ken Winey at the Edmonton 6, which resulted in a Trevor Kennerd field goal. On the next sequence Ham completed a 30-yard pass and run to Willis who then fumbled and Winnipeg safety Dave Bovell recovered. Danny McManus, coming off the bench, hit Rick House with a 56-yard pass and run for a touchdown.

== Trivia ==
Winnipeg's 28 points in the third quarter is a Grey Cup record for points in one quarter.

This was only the third time (and the most recent, as of 2025) that a team scored 50 or more points in a Grey Cup Game, the others being the 11th Grey Cup and the 44th Grey Cup.

Edmonton coach Joe Faragalli said, notwithstanding the lopsided score, "Never at one time did we feel that this was the end of the game. We were going to make a comeback".

This was the last game broadcast by the CFL's league-run syndication broadcast service, the Canadian Football Network, which started in 1987 and was shut down after this game. All CFL playoff and Grey Cup games would be exclusively broadcast on CBC Television starting the next year, continuing until 2007, when TSN gained exclusive broadcast rights to all CFL games, including the Grey Cup.

Until the 107th Grey Cup in 2019, this was Winnipeg's most recent major sports title (the Winnipeg Goldeyes 1994, 2012, 2016 and 2017 Championship wins notwithstanding). Following the Ottawa Redblacks' championship in 2016, Winnipeg held the second-longest championship drought in modern CFL history at 28 seasons.

== 1990 CFL Playoffs ==
=== West Division ===
- Semi-final (November 11 at Edmonton, Alberta) Edmonton Eskimos 43–27 Saskatchewan Roughriders
- Final (November 18 at Calgary, Alberta) Edmonton Eskimos 43–23 Calgary Stampeders

=== East Division ===
- Semi-final (November 11 at Toronto, Ontario) Toronto Argonauts 34–25 Ottawa Rough Riders
- Final (November 18 at Winnipeg, Manitoba) Winnipeg Blue Bombers 20–17 Toronto Argonauts
