= Enis Jackson =

American football player (born 1963)

No. 35
- Position: Defensive back

Personal information
- Born: May 16, 1963 (age 63); Helena, Arkansas, U.S.
- Listed height: 5 ft 9 in (1.75 m)
- Listed weight: 180 lb (82 kg)

Career information
- College: Memphis

Career history
- 1987: Cleveland Browns
- 1989–1992: Edmonton Eskimos
- 1993: Toronto Argonauts
- 1994–1995: BC Lions

Awards and highlights
- CFL All-Star (1989); 2× CFL West All-Star (1989, 1992)
- Stats at Pro Football Reference

Enis Jackson (born May 16, 1963) is an American former professional football player who was a defensive back in the National Football League (NFL) and Canadian Football League (CFL). He played college football for the Memphis Tigers. Jackson played in the NFL for the Cleveland Browns in 1987.
