= Craig Ellis (gridiron football) =

American gridiron football player (born 1961)

Profile
- Positions: Running back, Slotback

Personal information
- Born: January 26, 1961 (age 65); Los Angeles, California, U.S.
- Listed height: 6 ft 0 in (1.83 m)
- Listed weight: 190 lb (86 kg)

Career information
- College: San Diego State

Career history
- 1982: Winnipeg Blue Bombers
- 1983: Calgary Stampeders
- 1984–1985: Saskatchewan Roughriders
- 1986: Toronto Argonauts
- 1986: Miami Dolphins
- 1987: Los Angeles Raiders
- 1989–1992: Edmonton Eskimos
- 1993: Toronto Argonauts

Awards and highlights
- 2× CFL All-Star (1989, 1990); 3× CFL West All-Star (1984,1989, 1990); Jeff Nicklin Memorial Trophy (1990); Saskatchewan record: Most receptions - season (102) -1985; Eskimos eecord: Most receptions – season (106) - 1990
- Stats at Pro Football Reference

Craig Ellis (born January 26, 1961) is a former gridiron football running back and slotback who played ten seasons in Canadian Football League (CFL) for five different teams. He also played two seasons in the National Football League (NFL). Ellis played college football at San Diego State University.
