= Foort =

Foort is a surname. Notable people with the surname include:

- James Foort (1921–2020), Canadian inventor, artist, and innovator in the field of prosthetic limbs
- Reginald Foort (1893–1980), British cinema organist and theatre organist

== See also ==
- Fort (surname)
