= Peter Tuipulotu =

Tongan gridiron football player (born 1969)

No. 43, 32, 42
- Position: Fullback

Personal information
- Born: February 20, 1969 (age 57); Nukuʻalofa, Tonga
- Listed height: 5 ft 10 in (1.78 m)
- Listed weight: 205 lb (93 kg)

Career information
- High school: San Mateo (San Mateo, California, U.S.)
- College: BYU (1987–1991)
- NFL draft: 1992: undrafted

Career history
- San Diego Chargers (1992); Baltimore Stallions (1994–1995); Saskatchewan Roughriders (1996)

Awards and highlights
- Grey Cup champion (1995)
- Stats at Pro Football Reference

Peter Henry Tuipulotu (born February 20, 1969) is a Tongan former player of gridiron football. He played as a running back at Brigham Young University from 1988 to 1991. He played one season for the San Diego Chargers in 1992, and two for the Baltimore Stallions of the Canadian Football League, from 1994 to 1995. With the Stallions, he won the 83rd Grey Cup.

== Early life and college ==
Tuipulotu attended Brigham Young University from 1988 to 1991. He is currently 10th all time in rushing with 1,528 yards in 4 years.

Was Peninsula Athletic League offensive player of the year in 1985 and 1986 as well as All San Mateo County in the same years. Tuipulotu's older brother Tom attended BYU from 1984 to 1985, 1987.
