= Ken Benson =

American football player (born 1969)

No. 73, 38, 37
- Position: Linebacker

Personal information
- Born: March 4, 1969 (age 57); Kansas City, Kansas, U.S.
- Listed height: 6 ft 2 in (1.88 m)
- Listed weight: 220 lb (100 kg)

Career information
- High school: Manhattan (Manhattan, Kansas)
- College: Butler CC (1987–1988); Arkansas (1989–1990)
- NFL draft: 1991: undrafted

Career history
- Philadelphia Eagles (1991)*; Toronto Argonauts (1992–1993); Baltimore CFLers/Stallions (1994–1995); Montreal Alouettes (1996); Toronto Argonauts (1996–1997); Saskatchewan Roughriders (1998–1999)
- * Offseason or practice squad member only

Awards and highlights
- 3× Grey Cup champion (1995–1997); CFL East All-Star (1997)

Career CFL statistics
- Games played: 102
- Tackles: 477
- Sacks: 16
- Interceptions: 4
- Pass deflections: 7
- Forced fumbles: 2
- Fumble recoveries: 3
- Stats at CFL.ca

Kenneth Benson (born March 4, 1969) is an American former professional football linebacker who played in the Canadian Football League (CFL) with the Toronto Argonauts, Baltimore Stallions and Saskatchewan Roughriders. He played college football for the Butler Grizzlies and Arkansas Razorbacks. Benson also had a stint in the National Football League (NFL) with the Philadelphia Eagles.

== Early life ==
Benson was born on March 4, 1969, in Kansas City, Kansas. He attended Manhattan High School in Manhattan, Kansas. Benson played football with his brother, Maurice, and was an All I-70-League Team selection as a senior. On February 14, 1987, he signed a National Letter of Intent to play college football at Butler Community College.

== College career ==
Benson played college football for the Butler Grizzlies from 1987 to 1988 and Arkansas Razorbacks from 1989 to 1990. After two seasons at Butler, Benson transferred to University of Arkansas.

== Professional career ==
=== Philadelphia Eagles ===
After going undrafted in the 1991 NFL draft, Benson signed with the Philadelphia Eagles as an undrafted free agent. On August 26, he was waived by the team.

=== Toronto Argonauts (first stint) ===
On June 4, 1992, Benson was signed by the Toronto Argonauts of the Canadian Football League (CFL). He played two seasons for the team, recording 190 tackles, seven sacks, one interception and three fumble recoveries. In 1992, Benson was the Argonauts' Most Outstanding Rookie nominee and in 1993, he led the CFL in tackles. On February 8, 1994, he became a free agent.

=== Baltimore CFLers/Stallions ===
On March 9, 1994, Benson signed with the Baltimore CFL Colts (later renamed to the CFLers). In the first preseason game against the Shreveport Pirates, he broke his fibula on a punt return and had surgery shortly thereafter. On October 7, Benson made his season debut against the Las Vegas Posse, where he made six tackles. He played in five games that year with 20 tackles and one sack.

In April 1995, Benson another surgery to fix his broken ankle after it did not heal properly. On October 16, he was signed to the practice roster after he recovered from his surgery. On October 19, Benson was activated for the first time that season and played against the BC Lions, registering three special teams tackles. As a member of the Stallions, he won the 83rd Grey Cup.

=== Montreal Alouettes ===
In 1996, Benson moved to Canada after the Montreal Alouettes were revived from the Baltimore franchise. He played one game, where he had one tackle, before he was released on July 3.

=== Toronto Argonauts (second stint) ===
On July 8, 1996, Benson was signed by the Toronto Argonauts. In 16 games, he had 77 tackles, two sacks, two interceptions and three pass deflections. Benson was a starter for the Argonauts as the team won the 84th Grey Cup. The following season, he had 73 tackles, four sacks, one interception and one forced fumble and was named a CFL East All-Star. The Argonauts won back-to-back Grey Cups, defeating the Saskatchewan Roughriders for Benson's third straight championship. On February 16, 1998, he became a free agent.

=== Saskatchewan Roughriders ===
On March 5, 1998, Benson signed with the Saskatchewan Roughriders to a two-year contract. In two injury-riddled seasons in Saskatchewan, he played in 24 games, recording 113 tackles, two sacks, one pass deflection and forced fumble. Benson became a free agent at the end of the season. He was not brought back by the team after he missed ten games of the 1999 season for a knee injury.
