= Matt Goodwin (Canadian football) =

American gridiron football player (born 1970)

Profile
- Position: Linebacker

Personal information
- Born: July 15, 1970 (age 56); Philadelphia, Pennsylvania, U.S.

Career information
- College: Iowa State

Career history
- 1994–1995: Baltimore Stallions

Awards and highlights
- Grey Cup champion (1995); CFL's Most Outstanding Rookie Award (1994); Frank M. Gibson Trophy (1994)

Matt Goodwin (born July 15, 1970) is a former award-winning Canadian Football League (CFL) linebacker and Grey Cup champion.

Goodwin played his college football at Iowa State and played professionally for 2 years with the Baltimore Stallions. In 1994 he won the CFL's Most Outstanding Rookie Award on the strength of his 17 games played, 54 defensive tackles, 3 interceptions, 3 sacks, 4 blocked punts and 4 fumble recoveries (3 returned for touchdowns.) In 1995 he had 50 tackles, 1 sack and 2 interceptions and was part of the Stallions Grey Cup winning team.
