= Fortt =

Fortt is a surname. Notable people with the surname include:

- Jon Fortt (born 1976), American journalist
- Khairi Fortt (born 1992), American football player and actor

== See also ==
- Fort (surname)
