= Baltimore Colts (disambiguation) =

The Baltimore Colts were a National Football League franchise from 1953 until 1984, when they relocated to Indianapolis.

Baltimore Colts may also refer to:

- Baltimore Colts (1947–1950), a franchise in the All-America Football Conference (1947–1949) and National Football League (1950) that disbanded after the 1950 season
- Indianapolis Colts, the current incarnation of the former Baltimore Colts (1953–1983) franchise
- Baltimore Stallions, earlier the Baltimore CFL Colts, a Canadian Football League team based in Baltimore from 1994 to 1995

== See also ==
- History of the Indianapolis Colts
- Baltimore Ravens, Baltimore's current NFL team
