= Tracy Ham =

American gridiron football player (born 1964)

No. 8, 1
- Position: Quarterback

Personal information
- Born: January 5, 1964 (age 62); Gainesville, Florida, U.S.
- Listed height: 5 ft 11 in (1.80 m)
- Listed weight: 200 lb (91 kg)

Career information
- High school: Santa Fe (Alachua, Florida)
- College: Georgia Southern (1983–1986)
- NFL draft: 1987: 9th round, 240th overall pick

Career history

Playing
- 1987–1992: Edmonton Eskimos
- 1993: Toronto Argonauts
- 1994–1995: Baltimore Stallions
- 1996–1999: Montreal Alouettes

Coaching
- 2002–2003: Clark Atlanta

Awards and highlights
- 2× Grey Cup champion (1987, 1995); Grey Cup MVP (1995); CFL's Most Outstanding Player Award (1989); Jeff Nicklin Memorial Trophy (1989); Eddie James Memorial Trophy (1990); CFL All-Star (1989; CFL West All-Star (1989; 2× I-AA national champion (1985, 1986); Georgia Southern Eagles No. 8 retired; Edmonton Elks records: Most passing touchdowns in a season: 36 (1990); Most rushing yards by a quarterback in a season: 1,096 (1990)

Career CFL statistics
- Passing attempts: 4,943
- Passing completions: 2,670
- Completion percentage: 54%
- TD–INT: 284–164
- Passing yards: 40,534
- Passer rating: 86.6
- Canadian Football Hall of Fame (Class of 2010)
- College Football Hall of Fame (Class of 2007)

Tracy Ham (born January 5, 1964) is an American former professional football quarterback who played in the Canadian Football League (CFL). He played for the Edmonton Eskimos, the Toronto Argonauts, the Baltimore Stallions, and the Montreal Alouettes. He was known for his abilities as a dual-threat quarterback. He played college football for the Georgia Southern Eagles, where he became the first quarterback to rush for 3,000 yards and pass for 5,000 yards in a career. Ham is an inductee of both the College Football Hall of Fame and the Canadian Football Hall of Fame. Ham is currently the Senior Associate Athletics Director for Georgia Southern University.

== Playing career ==
=== College ===
With the Georgia Southern Eagles, Ham helped lead the team to back-to-back Division I-AA titles. The Eagles defeated Furman in the 1985 NCAA Division I-AA Football Championship Game, with Ham throwing for 419 yards and four touchdowns along with running in a two-point conversion. The following year, the Eagles defeated Arkansas State in the 1986 NCAA Division I-AA Football Championship Game, with Ham rushing for 180 yards and three touchdowns, while also passing for 306 yards and one touchdown. In 2007, Ham was inducted into the College Football Hall of Fame.

=== Professional ===
Pre-draft measurables
Height	Weight	Arm length	Hand span	40-yard dash	10-yard split	20-yard split	20-yard shuttle	Vertical jump	Broad jump	Bench press
5 ft 10 1/4 in (1.78 m)	196 lb (89 kg)	30 in (0.76 m)	9 1/4 in (0.23 m)	4.74 s	1.68 s	2.79 s	4.28 s	28.0 in (0.71 m)	9 ft 2 in (2.79 m)	6 reps
All values from NFL Combine

After his college career, Ham was selected by the Los Angeles Rams in the ninth round of the 1987 NFL draft with the 240th overall pick.

==== Edmonton Eskimos ====
On May 22, 1987, Ham signed a three-year deal with the Edmonton Eskimos of the CFL due to a belief that NFL teams wanted him to play a position other than quarterback.

In 1987, Ham served as the third-string quarterback behind Matt Dunigan and Damon Allen. He was a member of their Grey Cup winning team that season.

Prior to the 1988 season, Dunigan was traded to the BC Lions. During the season, Allen suffered injuries, which allowed Ham to establish himself as Edmonton's new starting quarterback. Ham passed for 2,840 yards and ran for another 628. Edmonton finished first place in the West Division, but lost the West Final to the BC Lions, who were quarterbacked by Dunigan.

In 1989, Ham won the CFL's Most Outstanding Player Award in leading the Eskimos to a league-record 16-2 record, throwing for 4,366 yards on 268 completions out of 517 attempts with 30 touchdowns to 18 interceptions. Ham became the first CFL quarterback to rush for over 1,000 yards with 1,005 on 125 carries and 10 touchdowns. On September 29 against Hamilton, he set the Edmonton record for most yards rushing by a quarterback in a single game (150). Unfortunately for the Eskimos, they were upset in the West Division Final by the 9-9 Saskatchewan Roughriders, who went on to win the Grey Cup.

In 1990, Ham added another 1,000 yard rushing season with 1,096 and passed for 4,286 yards. His 36 touchdown passes tied the franchise record set by Warren Moon in 1982. He had 3 100-yard rushing games. Edmonton finished second in the West Division, and defeated Saskatchewan in the West Semi-Final, and travelled to Calgary for the West Final, and beat the Stampeders. In the Grey Cup game, Edmonton was handily beaten by the Winnipeg Blue Bombers 50-11.

In 1991, Ham ran for 998 yards and passed for 3,862 yards and 31 touchdowns. He had 2 100-yard rushing games. On August 15 against Ottawa, Ham set the Edmonton record for most yards rushing by a quarterback in a single game (166). He tied the Edmonton franchise record for most touchdown passes in a game, 5, against the Toronto Argonauts on August 21. Edmonton finished first place in the West Division, but Calgary made up for their loss to Edmonton the year before, by making a comeback to defeat Edmonton and advance to the Grey Cup.

In 1992, Ham endured an injury plagued season, but played well enough to pass for 3,655 yards and 30 touchdowns and run for 655 yards. Edmonton finished second in the West Division, and defeated Saskatchewan in the West Semi-Final, but lost to the first place Calgary Stampeders in the West Final.

In Edmonton, Ham accumulated 19,240 pass yards and 142 pass touchdowns, both second in the team's history to Moon. The top 3 Edmonton single season quarterback rushing yardage totals belong to Ham (1989-1991).

==== Toronto Argonauts ====
In 1993, Ham was dealt to the Toronto Argonauts in a blockbuster eight-for-eight trade in 1993, but the Argos suffered through a 3-15 record. He threw for 2,147 yards and ran for 605, struggling to adapt to the Run & Shoot offense.

==== Baltimore CFLers and Stallions ====
In 1994, with the CFL expanding into the United States, Ham joined the newly-established Baltimore team in 1994. He gained his last plus 4,000 yard passing season with 4,348 and ran for 613 yards. Ham led the team, not yet named the Stallions, to the Grey Cup. Baltimore was the first non-Canadian team to qualify for a Grey Cup game. In the Grey Cup, the team was defeated by the BC Lions.

In 1995, Ham led the Baltimore team, now known as the Stallions, to first place in the South Division with a 15-3 record. He passed for 3,357 yards and ran for 610. The Stallions qualified for the Grey Cup game against the Calgary Stampeders. In the third quarter, Calgary had gone on an 11 play 75 yard touchdown drive to cut Baltimore’s lead to 24-20. Ham responded by engineering a 9 play 92 yard touchdown drive. On 2nd and 9 from Calgary’s 13 yard line, Ham looked like he was going to be sacked, but was able to escape and run for a touchdown. This touchdown put Baltimore up 31-20. The Stallions won 37-20 and became the only non-Canadian team to win the Grey Cup. Ham was named the Grey Cup MVP.

==== Montreal Alouettes ====
In 1996, with the demise of the US-based teams, the core of the Stallions franchise was transferred to Montreal where they became the third incarnation of the Alouettes. The team's offense was geared to the running attack, especially when Mike Pringle returned from the NFL midway through the season. Montreal finished second in the East Division, and lost the East Final to the eventual Grey Cup champion, Toronto Argonauts.

In 1997, Montreal once again finished second in the East Division, and once again lost the East Final to the eventual Grey Cup champion, Toronto Argonauts.

In 1998, Anthony Calvillo joined the Alouettes as the heir apparent to Ham at quarterback. Ham led the Alouettes in passing, and guided Montreal to second in the East Division once again. Montreal once again lost the East Final, this time the Hamilton Tiger-Cats.

In 1999, Calvillo led the Alouettes in passing. Montreal finished first in the East Division, and once again lost the East Final, this time at home against the Hamilton Tiger-Cats, who would go on to win the Grey Cup.

Ham retired after the 1999 season.

==== Legacy ====
In his career from 1987 to 1999 Ham accumulated 40,534 passing yards which currently ranks seventh all-time. He threw 4,943 times with 2,670 completions, 164 interceptions and 284 touchdowns. His 8,043 rushing yards presently puts him in tenth all time and second among quarterbacks, behind only Damon Allen. He tallied 1,059 carries with 62 touchdowns. In 2010, Ham was inducted into the Canadian Football Hall of Fame.

== Coaching career ==
In 2002, Ham was hired to serve as head coach of the Clark Atlanta Panthers football team. He led the Panthers to records of 2–9 in 2002 and 0–11 in 2003 before he was fired prior to the start of the 2004 season.

== Head coaching record ==
Year	Team	Overall	Conference	Standing	Bowl/playoffs
Clark Atlanta Panthers (Southern Intercollegiate Athletic Conference) (2002–2003)
2002	Clark Atlanta	2–9	1–7	9th	
2003	Clark Atlanta	0–11	0–8	9th	
Clark Atlanta:		2–20	1–15		
Total:		2–20			

== See also ==
- List of gridiron football quarterbacks passing statistics
