= Reggie Perry =

Reggie Perry may refer to:

- Syience, American songwriter
- Reggie Perry (basketball) (born 2000), American basketball player
- Reggie Perry (Canadian football) (born 1970), Canadian football wide receiver
