= Fort (surname) =

Fort is a surname. Notable people with the surname include:

== Arts and literature ==
- Charles Fort (1874–1932), American journalist and philosopher
- Charles Fort (poet) (born 1951), American poet
- Garrett Fort (1900–1948), American screenwriter
- Matthew Fort (born 1954), British food writer and critic
- Paul Fort (1872–1960), French poet
- Syvilla Fort (1917–1975), American dancer and choreographer

== Military ==
- Guy Fort (1879–1942), American military officer

== Politics ==
- De Witt Clinton Fort (1830–1868), American politician
- Franklin W. Fort (1880–1937), American politician
- George F. Fort (1809–1872), American politician
- Greenbury L. Fort (1825–1883), American politician
- John Franklin Fort (1852–1920), American politician
- Robert Boal Fort (1867–1904), American politician
- Vincent Fort (1956–2024), American politician

== Sports ==
- Austin Fort (born 1995), American footballer
- Héctor Fort (born 2006), Spanish footballer
- Neal Fort (born 1968), American footballer
- Cornelia Fort (1919–1943), American aviator

== Other ==
- Cornelia Fort (1919–1943), American aviator
- Jeff Fort (born 1947), American gang leader and convicted terrorist
- M. K. Fort Jr. (1921–1964), American mathematician
- Marron Curtis Fort (1938–2019), American-German translator and educator
- Pascual Fort (1927–1991), Catalan printmaker
- Ricardo Fort (1968–2013), Argentine socialite
