= Mid-American Review =

- Discipline: Literary journal
- Language: English

Publication details
- History: 1981–present
- Publisher: Bowling Green State University (United States)
- Frequency: Biannual

Standard abbreviations
- ISO 4: Mid-Am. Rev.

Indexing
- ISSN: 0747-8895

Links
- Journal homepage

Mid-American Review (MAR) is an international literary journal dedicated to publishing contemporary fiction, poetry, nonfiction, and translations. Founded in 1981, MAR is a publication of the Department of English and the College of Arts & Sciences at Bowling Green State University. It is produced by faculty, students, and alumni of Bowling Green's creative writing program.

Mid-American Review has published such writers as Steve Almond, Aimee Bender, Sven Birkerts, Billy Collins, Carl Dennis, Rita Dove, Stephen Dunn, Linda Gregg, Yusef Komunyakaa, Philip Levine, Mary Oliver, Richard Russo, William Stafford, James Tate, Melanie Rae Thon, David Foster Wallace, Dan Chaon, and C.K. Williams. The journal is also dedicated to introducing non-English speaking voices to its audience through its translation chapbook series.

Work which originally appeared in Mid-American Review has been reprinted in The Best American Poetry, The Best American Short Stories, The Best American Nonrequired Reading, Pushcart: Best of the Small Presses, The O. Henry Award, New Stories from the South, Poetry Daily, and Harper's Magazine.

== History ==
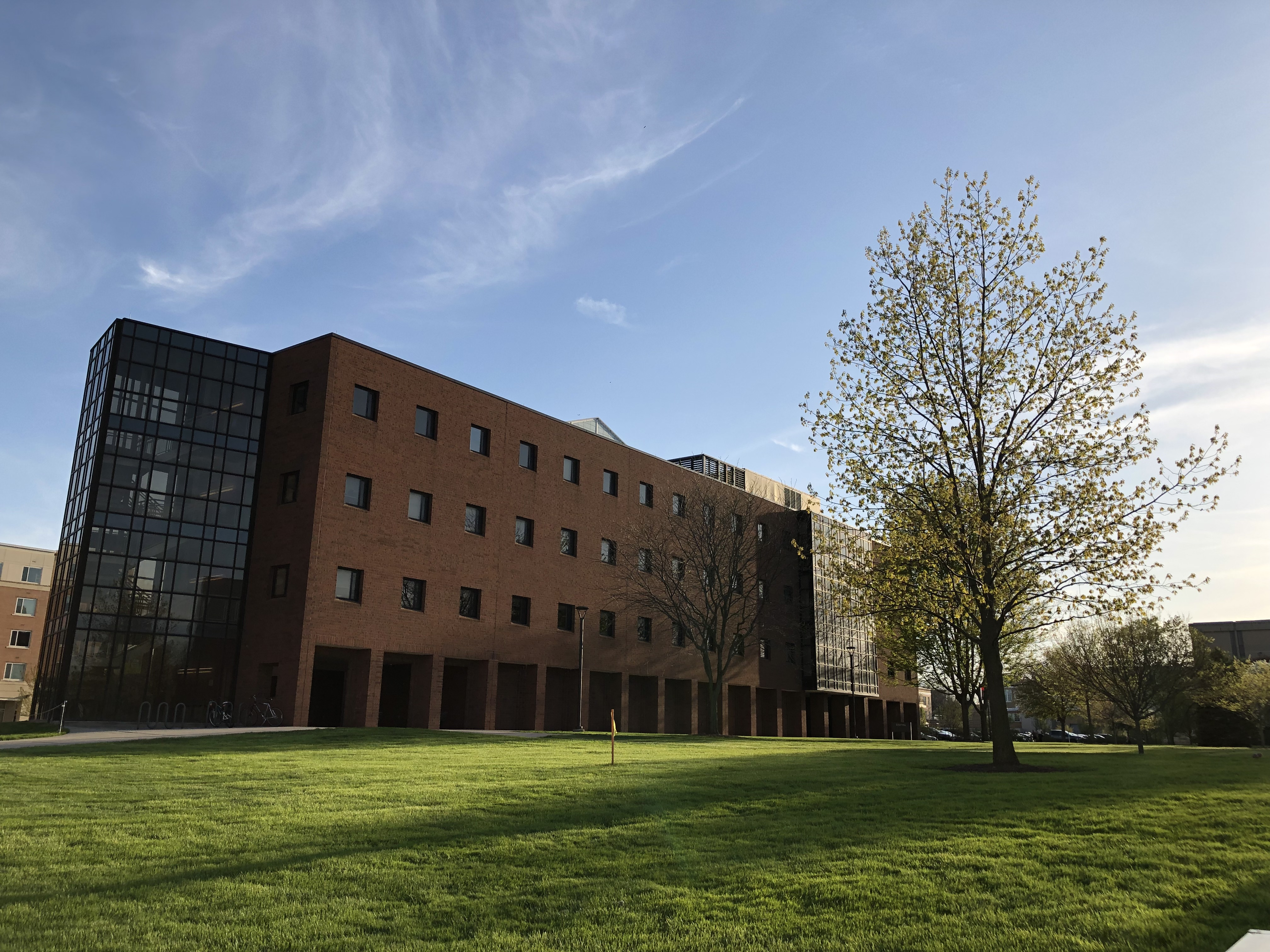
East Hall at Bowling Green State University. This building houses the BGSU English department.

Mid-American Review was started in 1972 by Robert Early, a professor of creative writing at Bowling Green State University, as Itinerary, a publishing format for graduates of Bowling Green State University's Masters of Fine Arts program. Itinerary provided early publication credits for such distinguished BG alumni as Carolyn Forche, Charles Fort, Jean Thompson, Tony Ardizzone, Dara Wier, Allen Wier, and many other fine poets, fiction writers, and essayists.

In 1980, wanting to diversify the magazines contents, then-MFA students Scott Cairns and Steve Heller suggested to Early that they better use their resources to transform the magazine from an in-house publisher to a journal of international scope. Early accepted the challenge and created Mid-American Review, offering it, at the same time, as editorial experience for BG's MFA students. Writers were solicited for the inaugural volume, which features work by such writers such as Mark Doty, Cathryn Hankla, Jonathan Holden, David Huddle, T.R. Hummer, A. Poulin, Jr., Richard Russo, and David Wagoner, as well as many new voices. The success of this volume encouraged Robert to continue with the new project, and MAR has been publishing the work of talented contemporary writers ever since.

A special issue featuring new work by past contributors, including David Kirby, Denise Duhamel, Robert Olmstead, Cate Marvin, Melanie Rae Thon, and Bob Hicok was released in 2004 to celebrate MAR's 25th Anniversary. This double-sized edition was followed by the journal's "Unpublished Writers Issue", showcasing the work of writers never before finding themselves in print. Mid-American Review continues to publish issues biannually featuring both emerging and established writers, most recently with their 30th Anniversary Issue, released in the summer of 2010.

== Winter Wheat: The Mid-American Review Festival of Writing ==
Mid-American Review hosts its annual Winter Wheat Festival of Writing each fall, bringing together present and former BGSU writers, but also nationally known and widely published guests for a series of lectures and workshops.

== See also ==
- List of literary magazines
