= Mini Print International of Cadaqués =

International printmaking contest

- Location: Cadaqués
- Country: Spain
- Presented by: Taller Galeria Fort and ADOGI
- First award: 1981
- Website: miniprint.org

The Mini Print International of Cadaqués is a print competition open to all printmaking techniques and tendencies in which artists from all over the world participate. The contest is held every year and it annually brings together about 650 artists from around 50 countries of the world. Apart from the annual exhibition held at the Taller Galeria Fort in Cadaqués, since 1992 the Mini Print is also presented in England and France.

The art gallery Taller Galeria Fort created by Pascual Fort and Mercedes Barberà Rusiñol in 1964, was first opened in Tarragona (1964-1973), where both renowned artists (Miró, Rouault...) and promising young artists from Camp de Tarragona exhibited. In 1965, Pascual Fort set up a workshop in New York. He had received an award from the Brooklyn Museum and a grant from the Institute of International Education in recognition of his work as an avant-garde artist and promoter. In 1973, the couple settled the gallery in Barcelona and Cadaqués, and in 1981 they conceived and carried out the first Mini Print International of Cadaqués, a contest that has become a reference in the world of printmaking.

In June 2016, one copy of the winning prints of all editions were donated to the Library of Catalonia.
