= CFL's Most Outstanding Player Award =

Award in the Canadian Football League

The George Reed Most Outstanding Player Award is an award given annually to the best player in the Canadian Football League. The two nominees for the award are the Terry Evanshen Trophy winner from the East Division, and the Jeff Nicklin Memorial Trophy winner from the West Division. The winner of the award is chosen by the Football Reporters of Canada.

The award was created in 1953 as the Schenley Award, named after Schenley Distillers Corporation, to honour the most outstanding player in Canadian Rugby Union, one of the forerunner leagues of the CFL; Schenley ended its sponsorship of the awards in 1988, and the awards have been unsponsored since. Broadcasters Ernie Calcutt, John Badham and Pierre Dufault were regular presenters of the Schenley Award.

== CFL's Most Outstanding Player Award winners ==
CFL's Most Outstanding Player Award winners
2026	Davis Alexander	QB	Montreal Alouettes
2025	Nathan Rourke	QB	BC Lions
2024	Brady Oliveira	RB	Winnipeg Blue Bombers
2023	Chad Kelly	QB	Toronto Argonauts
2022	Zach Collaros	QB	Winnipeg Blue Bombers
2021	Zach Collaros	QB	Winnipeg Blue Bombers
2020	Season cancelled due to the COVID-19 pandemic.		
2019	Brandon Banks	WR	Hamilton Tiger-Cats
2018	Bo Levi Mitchell	QB	Calgary Stampeders
2017	Michael Reilly	QB	Edmonton Eskimos
2016	Bo Levi Mitchell	QB	Calgary Stampeders
2015	Henry Burris	QB	Ottawa RedBlacks
2014	Solomon Elimimian	LB	BC Lions
2013	Jon Cornish	RB	Calgary Stampeders
2012	Chad Owens	WR/KR	Toronto Argonauts
2011	Travis Lulay	QB	BC Lions
2010	Henry Burris	QB	Calgary Stampeders
2009	Anthony Calvillo	QB	Montreal Alouettes
2008	Anthony Calvillo	QB	Montreal Alouettes
2007	Kerry Joseph	QB	Saskatchewan Roughriders
2006	Geroy Simon	SB	BC Lions
2005	Damon Allen	QB	Toronto Argonauts
2004	Casey Printers	QB	BC Lions
2003	Anthony Calvillo	QB	Montreal Alouettes
2002	Milt Stegall	SB	Winnipeg Blue Bombers
2001	Khari Jones	QB	Winnipeg Blue Bombers
2000	Dave Dickenson	QB	Calgary Stampeders
1999	Danny McManus	QB	Hamilton Tiger-Cats
1998	Mike Pringle	RB	Montreal Alouettes
1997	Doug Flutie	QB	Toronto Argonauts
1996	Doug Flutie	QB	Toronto Argonauts
1995	Mike Pringle	RB	Baltimore Stallions
1994	Doug Flutie	QB	Calgary Stampeders
1993	Doug Flutie	QB	Calgary Stampeders
1992	Doug Flutie	QB	Calgary Stampeders
1991	Doug Flutie	QB	BC Lions
1990	Mike "Pinball" Clemons	RB	Toronto Argonauts
1989	Tracy Ham	QB	Edmonton Eskimos
1988	David Williams	WR	BC Lions
1987	Tom Clements	QB	Winnipeg Blue Bombers
1986	James Murphy	WR	Winnipeg Blue Bombers
1985	Mervyn Fernandez	WR	BC Lions
1984	Willard Reaves	RB	Winnipeg Blue Bombers
1983	Warren Moon	QB	Edmonton Eskimos
1982	Condredge Holloway	QB	Toronto Argonauts
1981	Dieter Brock	QB	Winnipeg Blue Bombers
1980	Dieter Brock	QB	Winnipeg Blue Bombers
1979	David Green	RB	Montreal Alouettes
1978	Tony Gabriel	TE	Ottawa Rough Riders
1977	Jimmy Edwards	RB	Hamilton Tiger-Cats
1976	Ron Lancaster	QB	Saskatchewan Roughriders
1975	Willie Burden	RB	Calgary Stampeders
1974	Tom Wilkinson	QB	Edmonton Eskimos
1973	George McGowan	WR	Edmonton Eskimos
1972	Garney Henley	WR	Hamilton Tiger-Cats
1971	Don Jonas	QB	Winnipeg Blue Bombers
1970	Ron Lancaster	QB	Saskatchewan Roughriders
1969	Russ Jackson	QB	Ottawa Rough Riders
1968	Bill Symons	RB	Toronto Argonauts
1967	Peter Liske	QB	Calgary Stampeders
1966	Russ Jackson	QB	Ottawa Rough Riders
1965	George Reed	RB	Saskatchewan Roughriders
1964	Lovell Coleman	RB	Calgary Stampeders
1963	Russ Jackson	QB	Ottawa Rough Riders
1962	George Dixon	RB	Montreal Alouettes
1961	Bernie Faloney	QB	Hamilton Tiger-Cats
1960	Jackie Parker	QB	Edmonton Eskimos
1959	Johnny Bright	RB	Edmonton Eskimos
1958	Jackie Parker	QB	Edmonton Eskimos
1957	Jackie Parker	RB	Edmonton Eskimos
1956	Hal Patterson	OE/DB	Montreal Alouettes
1955	Pat Abbruzzi	RB	Montreal Alouettes
1954	Sam Etcheverry	QB	Montreal Alouettes
1953	Billy Vessels	RB	Edmonton Eskimos

== CFL's Most Outstanding Player Award runners up ==
Note: Prior to 1973 the runner up for this award was not the Jeff Russel Memorial Trophy or Jeff Nicklin Memorial Trophy winners. Finalists were first announced in 1953 and during the first years there were multiple runners-up.

- 1972 – Mack Herron (RB), Winnipeg Blue Bombers
- 1971 – Leon McQuay (RB), Toronto Argonauts
- 1970 – Tommy Joe Coffey (WR), Hamilton Tiger-Cats
- 1969 – George Reed (RB), Saskatchewan Roughriders
- 1968 – George Reed (RB), Saskatchewan Roughriders
- 1967 – Tommy Joe Coffey (WR), Hamilton Tiger-Cats
- 1966 – Ron Lancaster (QB), Saskatchewan Roughriders
- 1965 – Garney Henley (DB), Hamilton Tiger-Cats
- 1964 – Dick Shatto (RB), Toronto Argonauts
- 1963 – Joe Kapp (QB), BC Lions
- 1962 – Tommy Joe Coffey (WR), Edmonton Eskimos
- 1961 – Jackie Parker (QB), Edmonton Eskimos
- 1960 – Cookie Gilchrist (RB), Toronto Argonauts
- 1959 – Bernie Faloney (QB), Hamilton Tiger-Cats
- 1958 – Dick Shatto (RB), Toronto Argonauts
- 1957 – Hal Patterson (OE/DB), Montreal Alouettes
- 1956 – Jackie Parker (QB), Edmonton Eskimos
- 1955 – Jackie Parker, Edmonton; Dick Shatto, Toronto; Ken Carpenter, Saskatchewan
- 1954 – Rollie Miles, Edmonton and Alex Webster, Montreal
- 1953 – Tex Coulter, Montreal; John Henry Johnson, Calgary, Gene Roberts, Ottawa

== All-time records ==
Most MOP Wins by Player
Rank	Player	Position	Team(s)	Years won	Total wins
1	Doug Flutie	QB	BC Lions, Calgary Stampeders, Toronto Argonauts	1991, 1992, 1993, 1994, 1996, 1997	6
T-2	Anthony Calvillo	QB	Montreal Alouettes	2003, 2008, 2009	3
T-2	Russ Jackson	QB	Ottawa Rough Riders	1963, 1966, 1969	3
T-2	Jackie Parker	QB	Edmonton Eskimos	1957, 1958, 1960	3
T-5	Bo Levi Mitchell	QB	Calgary Stampeders	2016, 2018	2
T-5	Zach Collaros	QB	Winnipeg Blue Bombers	2021, 2022	2
T-5	Henry Burris	QB	Calgary Stampeders, Ottawa Redblacks	2010, 2015	2
T-5	Dieter Brock	QB	Winnipeg Blue Bombers	1980, 1981	2
T-5	Mike Pringle	RB	Baltimore Stallions, Montreal Alouettes	1995, 1998	2

Breakdown of winners by franchise
Rank	Franchise	Total wins	Most recent win
1	Calgary Stampeders	9	2018
2	Winnipeg Blue Bombers	8	2022
3	Toronto Argonauts	7	2023
4	Montreal Alouettes	7	2009
5	BC Lions	6	2025
6	Edmonton Eskimos	5	1989
7	Saskatchewan Roughriders	4	2007
8	Ottawa Rough Riders	3	1978
9	Hamilton Tiger-Cats	2	1999
10	Baltimore Stallions	1	1995

Positional breakdown of winners
Rank	Position	Total wins	Most recent win
1	Quarterback (QB)	51	2025
2	Running Back (RB)	17	2024
3	Wide Receiver (WR)	10	2019
4	Slotback (SB)	5	2006
5	Linebacker (LB)	1	2014
6	Offensive End/Defensive Back (OE/DB)	1	1956
7	Tight End (TE)	1	1978

== See also ==
- Jeff Nicklin Memorial Trophy
- Terry Evanshen Trophy
- Jeff Russel Memorial Trophy
