= Chris Wright (Canadian football) =

American football player (1972–2005)

No. 28, 2, 4
- Positions: Wide receiver, Kick returner

Personal information
- Born: August 24, 1972; Valdosta, Georgia, U.S.
- Died: July 31, 2005 (aged 32); Atlanta, Georgia, U.S.

Career information
- College: Georgia Southern

Career history
- 1995: Baltimore Stallions
- 1996–1998: Montreal Alouettes
- 2002: BC Lions

Awards and highlights
- Grey Cup champion (1995); CFL All-Star (1995); Frank M. Gibson Trophy (1995)

Chris R. Wright (August 24, 1972 – July 31, 2005) was a Canadian Football League (CFL) kick returner and Grey Cup champion.

Wright played college football at Georgia Southern. His first year as a professional was successful, for as kick returner with the Baltimore Stallions he scored 3 touchdowns on punt returns and added an 82-yard punt return for a touchdown in their Grey Cup victory. This won him the Frank M. Gibson Trophy as best rookie in the CFL Southern Conference, and an all-star selection.

He moved north to Canada with the Stallions when they relocated and became the revived Montreal Alouettes. He missed the entire 1996 season due to injury, but had an impressive 1997 campaign, with 2 punt return touchdowns. He was released after the 1998 season, but resurfaced in 2002 with the BC Lions, where he played 7 games.

Chris Wright was murdered in a shooting in Atlanta on July 31, 2005.
