= Frank M. Gibson =

Canadian businessman

- Born: 1916 or 1917
- Occupations: businessman, football executive
- Years active: ?–1983

Frank M. Gibson (born 1916 or 1917, date of death unknown) was a Canadian businessman who was a member of a group of businessmen who pushed for the merging of the Hamilton Wildcats and Hamilton Tigers football clubs to form the Hamilton Tiger-Cats in 1950. He was inducted into the Canadian Football Hall of Fame as a builder in 1996. The CFL's Frank M. Gibson Trophy for Outstanding Rookie in the Eastern Division is named in his honour. Gibson also served as secretary-treasurer for the CFL's East Division from 1962 to 1980 and was an administrative consultant with the Tiger-Cats until 1983. He also served in the capacity of treasurer, and later secretary-treasurer, as well as on the board of governors of the Tiger-Cats. In 1959 he played a role in investigating the possibility of an interlocking schedule for the CFL's two divisions, which would be implemented in 1960. In 1996, he was living in Ancaster, Ontario.
