= Mike Pringle (gridiron football) =

American gridiron football player (born 1967)

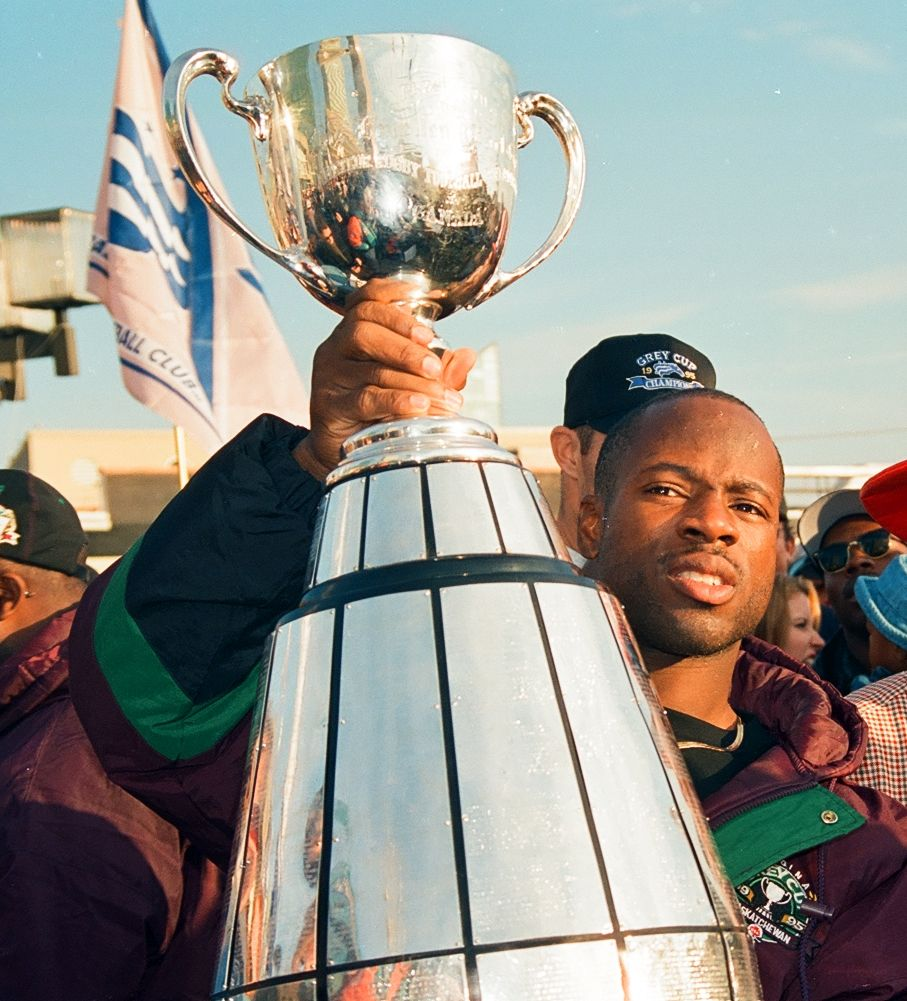
- Pringle holding the Grey Cup, 1995

No. 24, 20, 27, 28, 34
- Position: Running back

Personal information
- Born: October 1, 1967 (age 59); Los Angeles, California, U.S.
- Listed height: 5 ft 9 in (1.75 m)
- Listed weight: 202 lb (92 kg)

Career information
- High school: John F. Kennedy (Los Angeles)
- College: Cal State Fullerton
- NFL draft: 1990: 6th round, 140th overall pick

Career history
- 1990–1991: Atlanta Falcons
- 1992: Edmonton Eskimos
- 1992: Sacramento Surge
- 1993: Sacramento Gold Miners
- 1994–1995: Baltimore Stallions
- 1996: Denver Broncos*
- 1996–2002: Montreal Alouettes
- 2003–2004: Edmonton Eskimos
- * Offseason or practice squad member only

Awards and highlights
- 3× Grey Cup champion (1995, 2002, 2003); 2× CFL's Most Outstanding Player (1995, 1998); 4× Terry Evanshen Trophy (1994, 1995, 1998, 2000); 7× CFL All-Star (1994, 1995, 1997–2000, 2003); 7× CFL East All-Star (1994, 1996–2001); CFL West All-Star (2003); Montreal Alouettes No. 27 retired; World Bowl champion (1992); Third-team All-American (1989); Eskimos record, most rushing touchdowns – game - August 29, 2004
- Stats at Pro Football Reference
- Stats at CFL.ca (archive)
- Canadian Football Hall of Fame (Class of 2008)

Michael A. Pringle (born October 1, 1967) is an American former professional football player who was a running back in the Canadian Football League (CFL). He set or tied almost every significant league record for the position. He played college football for the Cal State Fullerton Titans, earning third-team All-American honors. He was twice signed by National Football League (NFL) teams, though he saw very limited playing time.

Along with George Reed and Johnny Bright, Pringle is one of the players most often mentioned as being the greatest running back in CFL history. In November 2006, Pringle was voted one of the CFL's Top 50 players (#4) of the league's modern era by Canadian sports network TSN. In April 2008, Pringle was inducted into the Canadian Football Hall of Fame in his first year of eligibility.

== Early life ==
Pringle was born in Los Angeles, California. He attended John F. Kennedy High School in Granada Hills, California and was a student and a letterman in football.

== College career ==
Pringle began his college career at Washington State University. Pringle transferred to California State University, Fullerton for his junior year, where he played on the Cal State Fullerton Titans football team. At Cal State Fullerton, Pringle shared the NCAA single-game rushing record at one time with 357 yards against New Mexico State on November 4, 1989. He also led the nation that year in all-purpose yardage with a school-record 2,690 yards.

== Professional career ==
=== Atlanta Falcons ===
Pringle played well enough to be selected 139th overall by the Atlanta Falcons in the 1990 NFL draft. Pringle spent most of the 1990 NFL season on the practice roster (although he dressed for the final three games). The final cut from Atlanta's 1991 training camp, Pringle, like fellow Cal State Fullerton alumni Damon Allen and Allen Pitts, went on to the Canadian Football League, where he became one of the best players in league history at his position.

=== Edmonton Eskimos (first stint) ===
Pringle entered the CFL in time for the 1992 CFL season, with the Edmonton Eskimos. In three games, Pringle received 22 carries for 129 yards, posting a respectable rushing average in limited action. However, like fellow import running back Robert Hardy, the Eskimos were not high on Pringle and released him. They opted to stick with their trio of Canadian ball carriers in Michael Soles, Blake Marshall and Brian Walling.

=== Sacramento Surge ===
Pringle spent the rest of 1992 with the Sacramento Surge of the World League of American Football.

=== Sacramento Gold Miners ===
In 1993, Pringle resurfaced with the CFL's Sacramento Gold Miners, remaining in the same city but switching leagues. In Sacramento, Pringle became an everyday player, although not a frequent option in the ground game that was led by former NFL running back Mike Oliphant. Still he racked up 366 yards and four touchdowns in his only season with the Gold Miners, before being traded in the offseason to the team where he would make his most lasting mark, the then-Baltimore Football Club, later to become the Baltimore Stallions.

=== Baltimore Stallions ===
Going into his third CFL season, Pringle had run the ball 82 times for less than five hundred yards: less than half a season's work for a starting CFL running back. Despite his lack of carries, however, Pringle became the starting back in Baltimore two games into the 1994 season replacing Sheldon Caney. Pringle immediately responded to the opportunity. The 27-year-old went loose in Baltimore, running for a record 1,972 yards and thirteen touchdowns, narrowly missing becoming the first CFL running back to reach the elusive 2,000 yards rushing milestone. He did however set a CFL record with 2,414 yards from scrimmage. He even returned 38 kicks for 814 yards and, in his first CFL playoff appearance, rang up 165 yards in two playoff games to lead Baltimore to their first Grey Cup appearance, where they lost the 82nd Grey Cup to the BC Lions 26–23 on Lui Passaglia's last-minute 38-yard field goal.

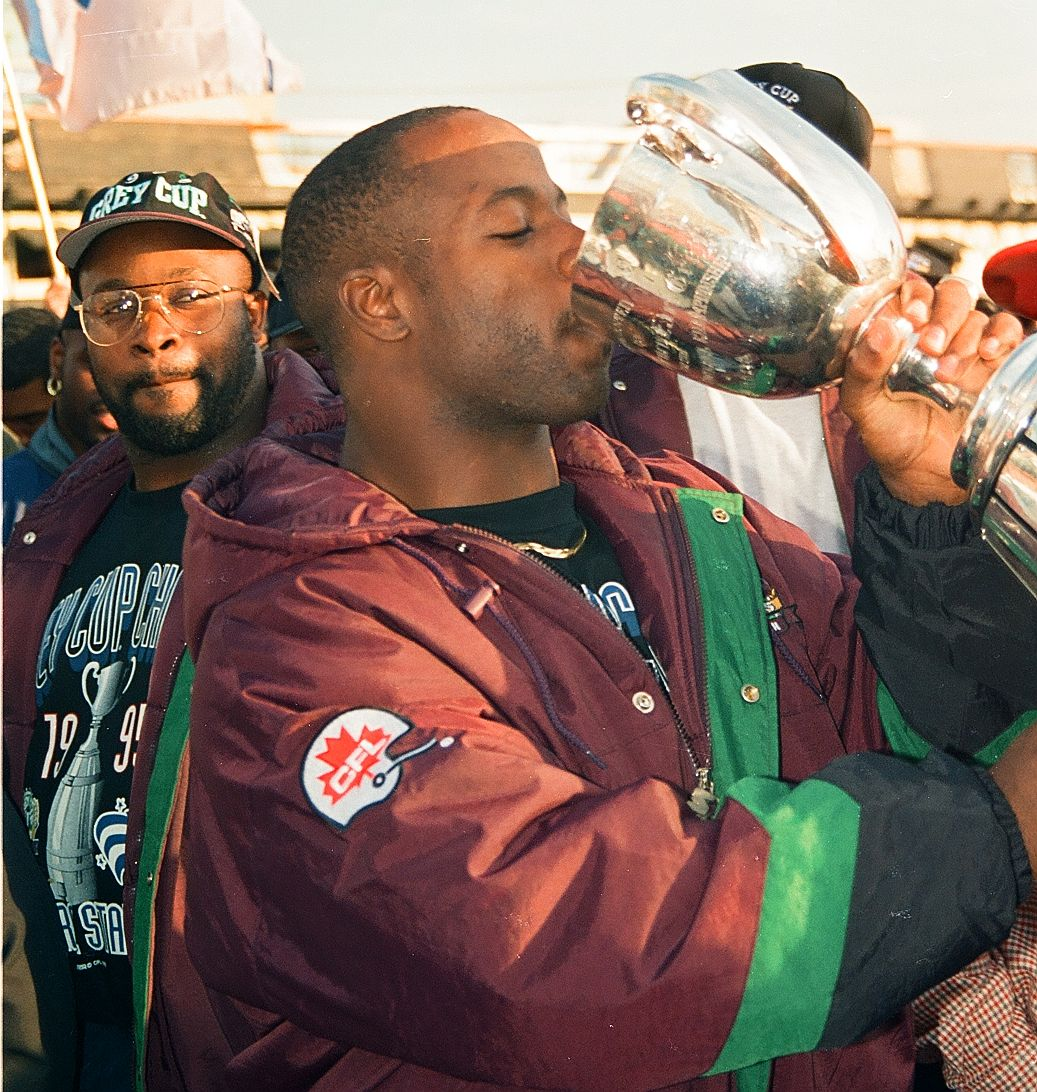
Pringle drinking from the Grey Cup in 1995

Compared to his remarkable 1994 season, 1995 was a slight dropoff for Pringle, but still an excellent season by any standard. His rushing totals declined to a "mere" 1,791 yards, and while his yards-per-carry fell by .6 from 6.4 to 5.8, his statistics were still the best any back posted in the CFL that year. To top it off, Pringle was a playoff workhorse, as he ran for 484 playoff yards and four touchdowns in three games. On the strong, powerful legs of Pringle, the Baltimore Stallions made their second straight appearance in the Grey Cup. This time, the Stallions would not be denied, taking the famous "Wind Bowl" over the Calgary Stampeders 37–20.

=== Denver Broncos ===
After his two seasons in Baltimore, Pringle began to attract more attention from the National Football League. The Denver Broncos signed Pringle to a free agent contract for the 1996 NFL season, but he was a late cut from training camp.

=== Montreal Alouettes ===
With no other NFL teams expressing interest in his abilities, Pringle returned to the CFL, following the relocated Baltimore franchise and joining the newly christened Montreal Alouettes late in the season. Pringle played only eight games but rushed for 825 yards and five touchdowns.

It was in 1997 that Pringle once again took his place as the CFL's best running back. His 1,775 yard season was his worst in a full season as a starter, but it was still an extremely strong season. With the Alouettes lacking in playoff success and their attendance at Olympic Stadium flagging, Pringle was one of the team's few bright spots in a disappointing year. But for the 1998 season, the Als moved permanently to the smaller Percival Molson Stadium, where they regularly drew sell-out crowds. They came to watch the Alouettes, especially Pringle, and he would not disappoint.

Pringle's 1998 CFL season stands out with Doug Flutie's 48-touchdown 1994 season, as one of the greatest CFL seasons an offensive player ever had. Pringle ran for only nine touchdowns but nobody in the league much cared: the story was his 2,065 rushing yards that year, a CFL record by a considerable margin. Pringle became the first, and so far only, man in CFL history to run for over 2,000 yards. He also tied his CFL record with 2,414 yards from scrimmage. At 31 years old, Pringle had hit his prime with a bang, and though he would never approach 2,000 yards again, he continued to be an elite back for several years.

In 1999, Pringle ran for 1,656 yards, over 400 fewer than in his record-shattering 1998. Moreover, playoff failure continued to dog the Alouettes. Pringle had run for 522 yards in his last four playoff games over two seasons, but a disappointing East Division final exit to the eventual champion Hamilton Tiger-Cats had Alouettes fans confused and angry. In 2000, the Alouettes would finally get to play in the 88th Grey Cup but lost to the BC Lions, 28–26. Pringle's rushing totals increased to 1,778 yards, but, more significantly, he rushed for a CFL record 19 touchdowns, a mark almost 50% greater than his previous season high of 13. Pringle also had a touchdown in the Grey Cup game.

By the end of the 2001 season, Pringle was 34 years old, an advanced age for a power running back. He was beginning to show wear and tear, as he ran for "only" 1,323 yards in that season while fighting nagging injuries all year. In 2002, the Alouettes would win the 90th Grey Cup over the Edmonton Eskimos 26–16, but Pringle would not be a big part of the game. Pringle was injured much of the year and feuded publicly with head coach Don Matthews, who believed Pringle was washed up and used running back Lawrence Phillips as his starter even when Pringle was healthy. Pringle, incensed at the treatment, left the Alouettes bitterly at the end of the season, signing with the team he had broken in with: the Edmonton Eskimos.

=== Edmonton Eskimos (second stint) ===
Pringle's 2003 season with the Eskimos was a return to form for the aging running back. Although he was not the man of 1998, Pringle was still a capable starter for a team on the rise, and with Ricky Ray at quarterback he did not have to be the main part of the team's offense. Pringle ran for 1,376 yards, his best total since 2000, and helped the Eskimos reach, and win, the 91st Grey Cup. Remarkably for a man whose first two seasons were spent largely on the bench, Pringle had George Reed's record 16,116 career rushing yards and 134 career rushing touchdowns well within his sights. Despite his age, most analysts believed Pringle breaking these records was not a matter of if, but when.

2004 proved these analysts right. Pringle ran for 1,141 yards, fourth in the CFL but a career low in a full, starting season. However, the yardage gave Pringle a total of 16,425 rushing yards, as Pringle broke the record in Vancouver, British Columbia against the BC Lions (he had been only a handful of yards short in the previous week's home game against the Calgary Stampeders, but despite receiving the ball on every play on the last few possessions Pringle did not set the mark in front of his home fans).

The season ended on some bitterness for Pringle, however. In the last game of the season, the Eskimos were close to the goal line in a tight game. Pringle at the time had 137 touchdowns, tied for Reed's record, and needed only one more to break it. However, head coach Danny Maciocia called a quarterback sneak that resulted in a score, meaning that Pringle finished the season tied with Reed. Pringle was publicly upset with his head coach, and the controversy may have affected the Eskimos in their playoff loss to the Saskatchewan Roughriders.

=== Retirement ===
After the 2004 season, Pringle announced his retirement from professional football. He finished with 16,425 career rushing yards and 20,254 total yards from scrimmage, both CFL records. He also finished tied with George Reed with 137 career touchdowns. Pringle led the CFL in rushing yards six time during his career.

On June 22, 2005, Pringle signed a contract with the Montreal Alouettes and then officially filed his retirement papers, so that he could retire as an Alouette. His jersey number, 27, was retired by the Alouettes at their June 23 season opener.

On April 2, 2008, Pringle was inducted into the Canadian Football Hall of Fame.

== Career statistics ==
Year	Team	GP	Rush	Yards	Y/R	Lg	TD
1990	Atlanta Falcons	3	2	9	4.5	9	0
1992	Sacramento Surge	-	152	507	3.3	22	6
1992	Edmonton Eskimos	2	22	129	5.9	30	0
1993	Sacramento Goldminers	18	60	366	6.1	44	4
1994	Baltimore (Stallions) CFLers	18	306	1,972	6.4	63	13
1995	Baltimore Stallions	17	311	1,791	5.8	86	13
1996	Montreal Alouettes	8	127	825	6.5	65	5
1997	Montreal Alouettes	17	306	1,775	5.8	60	12
1998	Montreal Alouettes	17	347	2,065	6.0	56	9
1999	Montreal Alouettes	16	322	1,656	5.1	43	13
2000	Montreal Alouettes	17	326	1,778	5.5	62	19
2001	Montreal Alouettes	14	262	1,323	5.0	47	16
2002	Montreal Alouettes	6	39	227	5.8	40	0
2003	Edmonton Eskimos	18	273	1,377	5.0	61	13
2004	Edmonton Eskimos	18	259	1,141	4.4	51	8
Total		188	2,960	16,425	5.6	86	137
