= Reggie Perry (Canadian football) =

American gridiron football player (born 1970)

No. 16
- Position: Wide receiver

Personal information
- Born: September 23, 1970 (age 56); Denison, Texas, U.S.

Career information
- College: USC

Career history
- 1994–1995: Baltimore Stallions

Awards and highlights
- Grey Cup champion (1995)

Career CFL statistics
- Receptions: 32
- Receiving yards: 557
- Touchdowns: 2

Reggie Perry (born September 23, 1970) is an American former professional football wide receiver in the Canadian Football League (CFL). He played for the Baltimore Stallions. Perry played college football at Southern California (USC), where he was a quarterback.
