= Neal Fort =

American gridiron football player (born 1968)

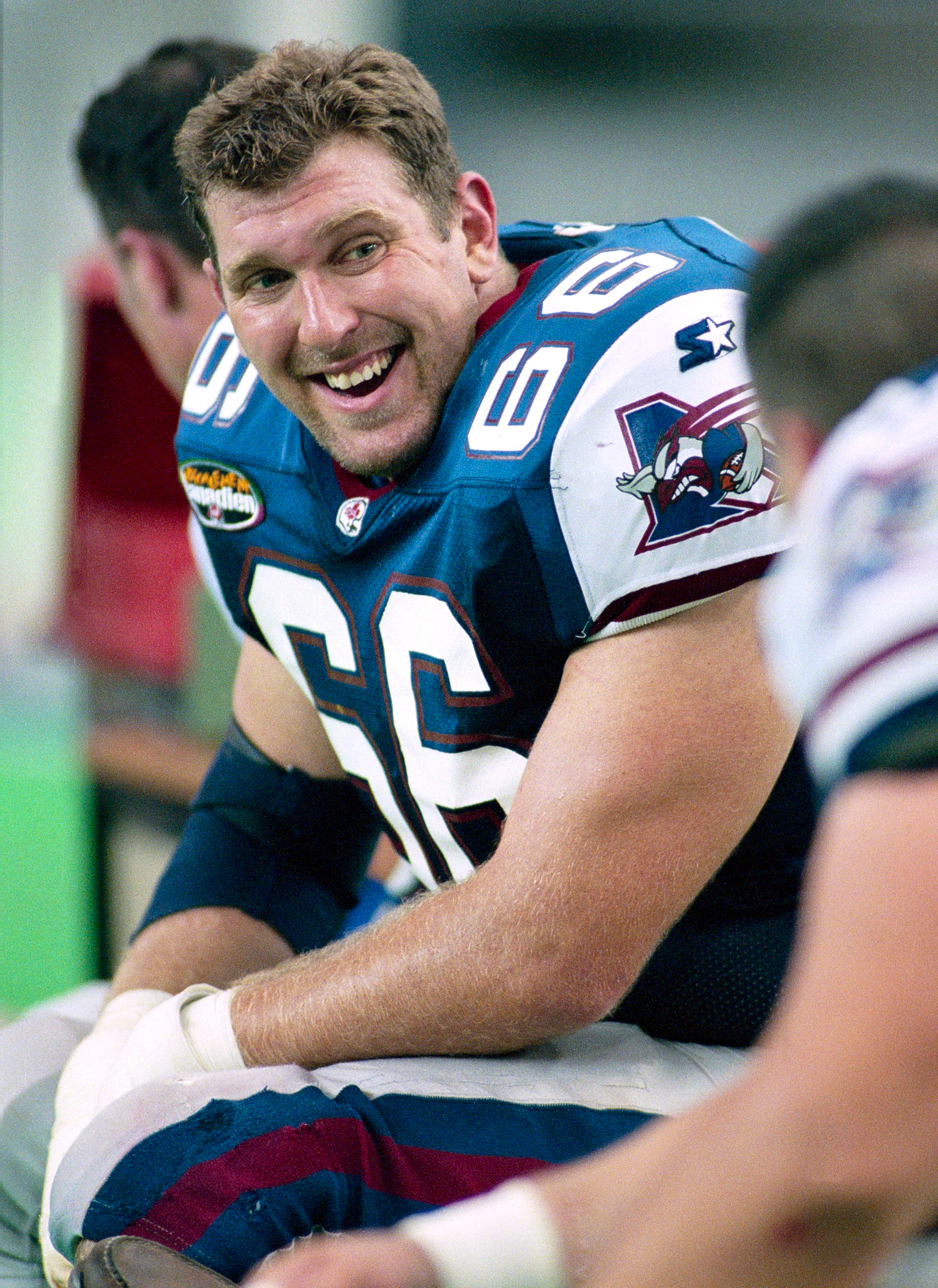

No. 76, 73, 66
- Position: Offensive tackle

Personal information
- Born: April 12, 1968 (age 58); Warner Robins, Georgia, U.S.
- Listed height: 6 ft 7 in (2.01 m)

Career information
- High school: Central Union
- College: BYU
- NFL draft: 1991: 6th round, 143rd overall pick

Career history
- 1991: Los Angeles Rams*
- 1992: Atlanta Falcons
- 1994–1995: Baltimore Stallions
- 1996–2004: Montreal Alouettes
- * Offseason or practice squad member only

Awards and highlights
- 2× Grey Cup champion (1995, 2002); 2× CFL All-Star (1995, 1997); 3× CFL East All-Star (1996, 1997, 2003); First-team All-WAC (1990); Second-team All-WAC (1989)

Neal Fort (born April 12, 1968) is an American former professional football player. In college, he played for Brigham Young University. He was an offensive lineman in the National Football League (NFL) for the Los Angeles Rams and the Canadian Football League (CFL) for the Baltimore Stallions and Montreal Alouettes for most of his career.

== Early life ==
Fort attended Central Union High School in El Centro, California. Was a 2-year Letterman in football as an offensive tackle and defensive end. He played for the late Cal Jones and gives much of his credit to Coach Jones for his belief in the type of player and person he became. Fort was a 1984 California Interscholastic Federation first team selection as an offensive lineman and 1985 first team selection as an offensive lineman and defensive line.

== College career ==
Fort played left tackle for Brigham Young University under College Football Hall of Fame coach LaVell Edwards. He was instrumental in the success of prolific BYU offense in the late 80's and early 1990s. Fort for was one of the key protectors for College Football Hall of Fame Ty Detmer and his record-breaking career. Detmer went on to win the Heisman Trophy for the 1990 football season.

== Professional career ==
Fort was selected by the Los Angeles Rams in the sixth round of the 1991 NFL draft. He made the teams developmental roster for the entire 1991 season. 1992 off-season He was assigned to the Orlando Thunder of NFL Europa in 1991, but did not play. Fort joined the Baltimore Colts in there inaugural season in 1994. In that season with the Baltimore Colts/Stallions, the team went on to play in the 1994 82nd Grey Cup in Vancouver, British Columbia. They lost to a home town BC Lions team 26-23. He went on to win his first Grey Cup in 1995, the 83rd Grey Cup. The Baltimore Stallions went on to defeat the Calgary Stampeders 37-20, led by Doug Flutie. He would win another Grey Cup in 2002 as a member of the Montreal Alouettes (by this time, the Stallions had moved to Montreal to become the current incarnation of the Alouettes). Fort is currently eligible for the Canadian Football Hall of Fame.

== Personal life ==
He currently resides in The Woodlands, Texas. Neal has been married to Darla Fort, since 1994. They have three children: Annie Fort, Jackson Fort, and Miles Fort
