= Tristan Okpalaugo =

American gridiron football player (born 1989)

Profile
- Position: Outside linebacker

Personal information
- Born: October 10, 1989 (age 37); Livermore, California, U.S.
- Listed height: 6 ft 4 in (1.93 m)
- Listed weight: 260 lb (118 kg)

Career information
- College: Fresno State
- NFL draft: 2013: undrafted

Career history
- Miami Dolphins (2013)*; Minnesota Vikings (2013)*; Dallas Cowboys (2014)*; Toronto Argonauts (2014); Arizona Cardinals (2016)*; Winnipeg Blue Bombers (2017–2018)
- * Offseason or practice squad member only

Awards and highlights
- Frank M. Gibson Trophy (2014)

Career CFL statistics
- Tackles: 58
- Sacks: 20
- Interceptions: 2
- Fumble recoveries: 1
- Stats at CFL.ca
- Stats at Pro Football Reference

Tristan Okpalaugo (born October 10, 1989) is an American former professional football outside linebacker. He signed with the Miami Dolphins as undrafted free agent in 2013. He played college football for the Fresno State Bulldogs.

== Early life ==
He attended Granada High School in Livermore, California. He was selected to the First team East Bay Athletics All-League in 2007 in which he played defensive end, wide receiver and tight end in high school. He was named an honorable mention for the All-Metro football team in his senior year in high school. He was named as Granada High School Most Improved Player in 2007. He also played other sports including basketball and competed in track and field was selected to the first-team East Bay Athletics All-League basketball team twice during high school.

== Professional career ==
=== Miami Dolphins ===
On April 27, 2013, he signed with the Miami Dolphins as an undrafted free agent following the 2013 NFL draft. He failed to make the 53 man roster.

=== Minnesota Vikings ===
On September 2, 2013, he was signed as a defensive end for the Minnesota Vikings practice squad and then released on September 10, 2013.

=== Toronto Argonauts ===
Okpalaugo was signed by the Toronto Argonauts (CFL) on June 22, 2014. He was the East Division nominee for the CFL's Most Outstanding Rookie Award in 2014, winning the Frank M. Gibson Trophy.

=== Arizona Cardinals ===
Okpalaugo was signed by the Arizona Cardinals on February 19, 2016. On September 3, 2016, he was waived/injured by the Cardinals and placed on injured reserve. On September 12, he was released from the Cardinals' injured reserve.

=== Winnipeg Blue Bombers ===
On February 8, 2017, Okpalaugo signed a two-year contract with the Winnipeg Blue Bombers (CFL).

== Personal ==
Okpalaugo is also the son of Chris and Mary Ann Okpalaugo of Livermore, California.
