= Frank M. Gibson Trophy =

Canadian Football League trophy

The Frank M. Gibson Trophy is a Canadian Football League trophy, given to the most outstanding rookie in the East Division. Each team from the East Division nominates a candidate from which a winner is chosen, and either this winner or the winner of the Jackie Parker Trophy will receive the Canadian Football League Most Outstanding Rookie Award.

Prior to 1973, the Gruen Trophy was originally awarded to the East's Most Outstanding Canadian Rookie before being retired.

In 1995, as part of the failed American expansion, the Gibson Trophy was given to the most outstanding rookie in the South Division.

== Frank M. Gibson Trophy winners ==
- 2025 – Devin Veresuk (LB). Hamilton Tiger-Cats
- 2024 – Shemar Bridges (WR). Hamilton Tiger-Cats
- 2023 – Qwan'tez Stiggers (DB), Toronto Argonauts
- 2022 – Tyson Philpot (WR), Montreal Alouettes
- 2021 – Peter Nicastro (OG), Toronto Argonauts
- 2020 – Season cancelled due to COVID-19
- 2019 – Jake Wieneke (WR), Montreal Alouettes
- 2018 – Lewis Ward (K), Ottawa Redblacks
- 2017 – James Wilder Jr. (RB), Toronto Argonauts
- 2016 – Jason Lauzon-Séguin (OT), Ottawa Redblacks
- 2015 – Vidal Hazelton (WR), Toronto Argonauts
- 2014 – Tristan Okpalaugo (DL), Toronto Argonauts
- 2013 – C. J. Gable (RB), Hamilton Tiger-Cats
- 2012 – Chris Matthews (WR), Winnipeg Blue Bombers
- 2011 – Chris Williams (WR), Hamilton Tiger-Cats
- 2010 – Marcus Thigpen (RB), Hamilton Tiger-Cats
- 2009 – Jonathan Hefney (LB), Winnipeg Blue Bombers
- 2008 – Prechae Rodriguez (WR), Hamilton Tiger-Cats
- 2007 – Nick Setta (P/K), Hamilton Tiger-Cats
- 2006 – Etienne Boulay (LB), Montreal Alouettes
- 2005 – Matthieu Proulx (DS), Montreal Alouettes
- 2004 – Almondo Curry (CB), Montreal Alouettes
- 2003 – Julian Radlein (FB), Hamilton Tiger-Cats
- 2002 – Keith Stokes (WR), Montreal Alouettes
- 2001 – Charles Roberts (RB), Winnipeg Blue Bombers
- 2000 – Albert Johnson III (WR), Winnipeg Blue Bombers
- 1999 – Corey Grant (WR), Hamilton Tiger-Cats
- 1998 – Barron Miles (DB), Montreal Alouettes
- 1997 – Derrell Mitchell (SB), Toronto Argonauts
- 1996 – Joseph Rogers (WR), Ottawa Rough Riders
- 1995 – Chris Wright (WR), Baltimore Stallions
- 1994 – Matt Goodwin (DB), Baltimore Football Club
- 1993 – Mike O'Shea (DT), Hamilton Tiger-Cats
- 1992 – Michael Richardson (RB), Winnipeg Blue Bombers
- 1991 – Raghib "Rocket" Ismail (WR), Toronto Argonauts
- 1990 – Reggie Barnes (RB), Ottawa Rough Riders
- 1989 – Stephen Jordan (DB), Hamilton Tiger-Cats
- 1988 – Orville Lee (RB), Ottawa Rough Riders
- 1987 – Gil Fenerty (RB), Toronto Argonauts
- 1986 – Willie Pless (LB), Toronto Argonauts
- 1985 – Nick Benjamin (OL), Ottawa Rough Riders
- 1984 – Dwaine Wilson (RB), Montreal Concordes
- 1983 – Johnny Shepherd (RB), Hamilton Tiger-Cats
- 1982 – Chris Isaac (QB), Ottawa Rough Riders
- 1981 – Cedric Minter (RB), Toronto Argonauts
- 1980 – Dave Newman (SB), Toronto Argonauts
- 1979 – Martin Cox (WR), Ottawa Rough Riders
- 1978 – Ben Zambiasi (LB), Hamilton Tiger-Cats
- 1977 – Mike Murphy (RB), Ottawa Rough Riders
- 1976 – Neil Lumsden (RB), Toronto Argonauts
- 1975 – Tom Clements (QB), Ottawa Rough Riders

== Outstanding Rookie in the East Division prior to the trophy ==
- 1974 – Sam Cvijanovich (LB), Toronto Argonauts
- 1973 – Johnny Rodgers (WR), Montreal Alouettes
- 1972 – Chuck Ealey (QB), Hamilton Tiger-Cats

See Gruen Trophy to view other recipients of an award given to the most outstanding rookie in the East Division.
