= Alvin Walton =

American football player (born 1964)

No. 40, 4
- Position: Safety

Personal information
- Born: March 14, 1964 (age 62); Riverside, California, U.S.
- Listed height: 6 ft 0 in (1.83 m)
- Listed weight: 180 lb (82 kg)

Career information
- High school: Banning (Banning, California)
- College: Mt. San Jacinto; Kansas
- NFL draft: 1986: 3rd round, 75th overall pick

Career history
- Washington Redskins (1986–1991); Baltimore Stallions (1994–1995)

Awards and highlights
- 2× Super Bowl champion (XXII, XXVI); Grey Cup champion (1995)

Career NFL statistics
- Interceptions: 12
- Fumble recoveries: 1
- Touchdowns: 2
- Stats at Pro Football Reference

Alvin Earl Walton (born March 14, 1964) is an American former professional football player who was a safety for the Washington Redskins of the National Football League (NFL) and Baltimore Stallions of the Canadian Football League (CFL). He played college football at Mt. San Jacinto College and the University of Kansas. Walton is among a select group who have won both an NFL and CFL championship.

== Early life ==
Walton was born in Riverside, California, and attended Banning High School in Banning, California.

== College career ==
After graduating from high school, Walton attended and played college football at Mt. San Jacinto College for two years, before transferring to the University of Kansas. He was ruled academically ineligible to compete during what would have been his senior year in 1985, and he never earned a degree.

== Professional career ==
=== NFL ===
Walton was drafted in the third round (75th overall) of the 1986 NFL draft by the Washington Redskins and won Super Bowl XXII and XXVI with the team. After being release by the team in 1992, he worked for Federal Express and the U.S. Postal Service and attended barber school.

=== CFL ===
After being out of football for three years, Walton joined the Baltimore Stallions of the CFL, where he won the 83rd Grey Cup in 1995. It was the only time an American franchise won the Grey Cup.

== Personal life ==
Walton is married and has seven children. His wife pawned his two Super Bowl rings and hoped to redeem them when the family's situation improved, but they were sold without Walton's knowledge.
