= Josh Miller (punter) =

American football player (born 1970)

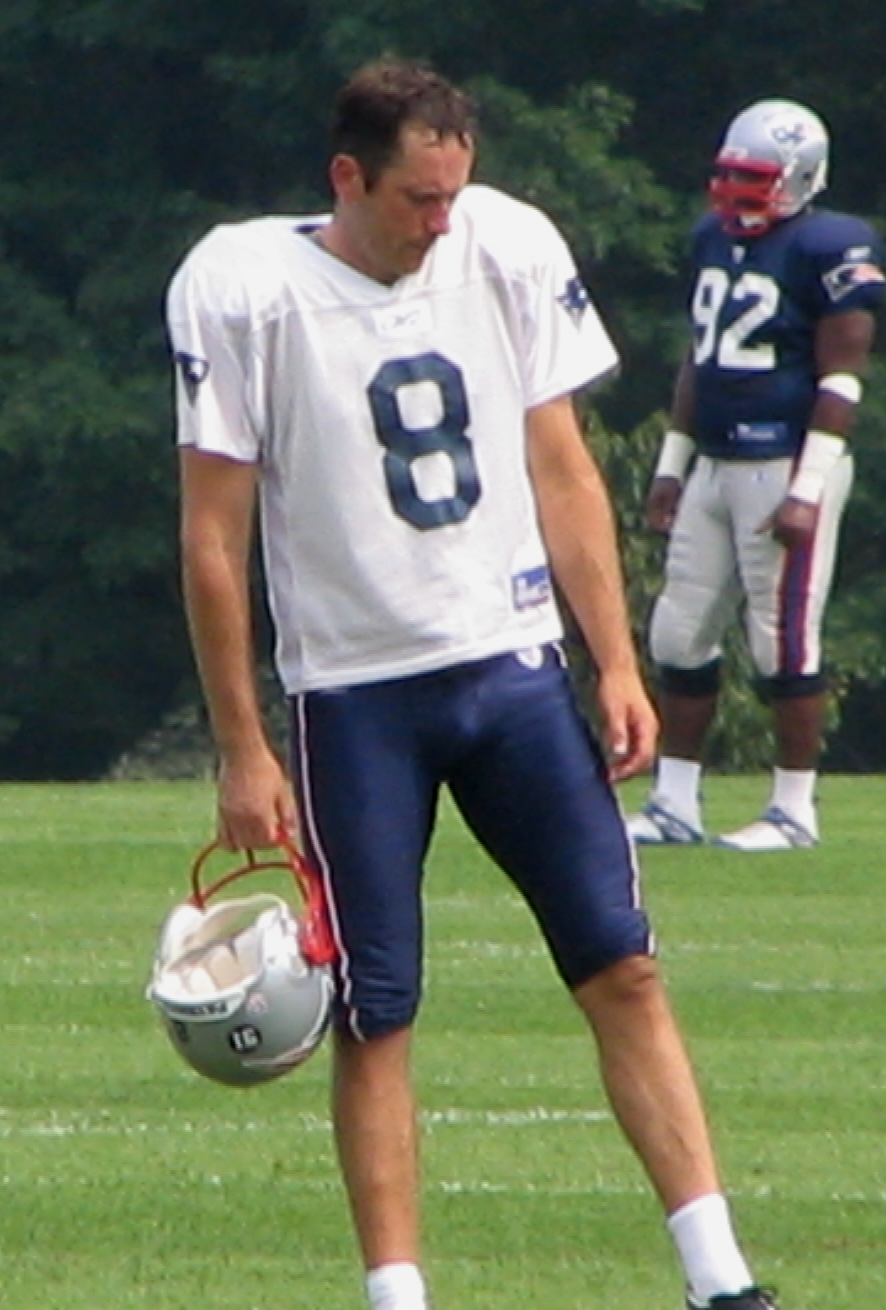
- Miller at Patriots training camp in 2007

No. 22, 4, 8
- Position: Punter

Personal information
- Born: April 14, 1970 (age 56); Queens, New York, U.S.
- Listed height: 6 ft 4 in (1.93 m)
- Listed weight: 225 lb (102 kg)

Career information
- High school: East Brunswick (East Brunswick, New Jersey)
- College: Arizona
- NFL draft: 1993: undrafted

Career history
- Green Bay Packers (1993)*; Baltimore Stallions (1994–1995); Seattle Seahawks (1996)*; Pittsburgh Steelers (1996–2003); New England Patriots (2004–2006); Tennessee Titans (2007)
- * Offseason or practice squad member only

Awards and highlights
- Super Bowl champion (XXXIX); New England Patriots All-2000s Team; Grey Cup champion (1995); 2× CFL All-Star (1994–1995); First-team All-American (1992); First-team All-Pac-10 (1992)

Career NFL statistics
- Punts: 750
- Punt yards: 32,297
- Longest punt: 75
- Stats at Pro Football Reference

Joshua Harris Miller (born April 14, 1970) is an American former professional football player who was a punter in the Canadian Football League (CFL) and National Football League (NFL).

Miller played college football for the Arizona Wildcats, and was a first-team All-American in 1992. He was signed by the Baltimore Stallions of the CFL as an undrafted free agent in 1994. Miller was also a member of the Seattle Seahawks, Pittsburgh Steelers, New England Patriots and Tennessee Titans of the NFL, and played in 168 games in his NFL career. After his playing career, he became a football analyst.

== Early life ==
Miller, who is Jewish, attended East Brunswick High School and East Brunswick Jewish Center (EBJC) in East Brunswick, New Jersey. In East Brunswick High School he was an All-State pick in football (playing wide receiver, in addition to handling the duties of punting where he still holds some career records) and track (as a high jumper), as well as playing guard in basketball.

Miller was a high school classmate and football teammate of The Young Turks founder and CEO, Cenk Uygur.

== College career ==
=== Scottsdale Community College ===
Miller attended Scottsdale Community College for two years and was a letterman in football with the Fighting Artichokes. He was a two-time All-Western States Football League pick at punter.

=== Arizona ===
Miller transferred to the University of Arizona and was a two-year letterman in football. He was an All-Pacific-10 Conference selection and an All-America selection as a senior.

== Professional career ==
=== Baltimore Stallions ===
After graduating from Arizona, Miller signed in 1994 playing for the Baltimore Stallions of the Canadian Football League (recommended by Rich Ellerson, his former Arizona coach who once was a CFL staffer) and was a member of the 1995 Grey Cup champion team. Miller recorded a "single" in the 83rd Grey Cup when a punt, aided by a 50-km/h wind at Taylor Field in Regina, Saskatchewan bounded over the head of a Calgary Stampeders return man and out the back of the end zone to award Baltimore a single point. Miller would suffer a scary injury in a 1995 matchup against the San Antonio Texans when he muffled a snap but was able to punt the ball away while it was on the ground. As he kicked it and defenders attempted to block the kick, one San Antonio player diving came in contact with Miller's legs, causing him to flip and land on his head. The hit would cause him to lay motionless on the field for over a minute and Miller would be taken off the field on a gurney.

=== Seattle Seahawks ===
Miller spent the preseason with the Seattle Seahawks before being released in the fall of the 1996 season.

=== Pittsburgh Steelers ===
In 1996 Miller joined the Pittsburgh Steelers. He stayed with the team through 2003, and continues to make his home in Pittsburgh.

In a 2003 game against the Baltimore Ravens, Miller completed an 81-yard touchdown pass to Steelers' teammate Chris Hope. This tied a record held by Gary Hammond and Arthur Marshall for the longest pass completion by a non-quarterback in NFL history.

=== New England Patriots ===
Before the 2004 season Miller signed with the Patriots, with whom he played during the 2004, 2005, and 2006 seasons.

In Super Bowl XXXIX, Miller had two notable punts, one to the Eagles' 7-yard line and another that pinned the Eagles back at their own 4-yard line with just 46 seconds left in the game.

In his career with the Patriots, Miller played in 42 straight regular season games, before being placed on injured reserve on November 24, 2006. Miller was released on August 16, 2007.

=== Tennessee Titans ===
On September 21, 2007, Miller signed with the Tennessee Titans due to injuries to Craig Hentrich, and made his debut against New Orleans Saints on September 24, 2007. On December 17, 2007, the Titans released him. He was later re-signed by the Titans on May 23, 2008, only to be released again on August 19, 2008.

The Titans re-signed Miller four games into the 2008 regular season on October 4, 2008. The team released quarterback Chris Simms to make room for Miller on the roster, but two days later Miller was released again as Simms was re-signed.

== NFL career statistics ==
Legend
	Won the Super Bowl
	Led the league
**Bold**	Career high

Year	Team	Punting									
Year	Team	GP	Punts	Yds	Net Yds	Lng	Avg	Net Avg	Blk	Ins20	TB
1996	PIT	12	55	2,256	1,848	61	41.0	33.6	0	18	8
1997	PIT	16	64	2,729	2,238	72	42.6	35.0	0	17	11
1998	PIT	16	81	3,530	2,980	73	43.6	36.8	0	**34**	**12**
1999	PIT	16	84	3,795	3,203	**75**	**45.2**	38.1	0	27	10
2000	PIT	16	**90**	**3,944**	**3,413**	67	43.8	37.5	**1**	**34**	8
2001	PIT	16	59	2,505	2,095	64	42.5	34.9	**1**	23	5
2002	PIT	14	55	2,267	1,821	62	41.2	32.5	**1**	14	5
2003	PIT	16	84	3,521	3,062	72	41.9	36.0	**1**	27	8
2004	NWE	16	56	2,350	1,885	69	42.0	33.7	0	19	5
2005	NWE	16	76	3,431	2,946	59	45.1	**38.3**	**1**	22	4
2006	NWE	10	43	1,848	1,539	62	43.0	35.8	0	12	7
2007	TEN	1	3	121	111	52	40.3	37.0	0	1	0
Career		165	750	32,297	27,141	75	43.1	35.9	5	248	83

== Post-NFL career ==
Miller joined KDKA-FM in Pittsburgh as an analyst on July 13, 2010 and also provides commentary for its sister television station KDKA-TV. He co-hosted The Fan Morning Show with Colin Dunlap and Jim Colony until April 2018. Miller is the president and co-founder of GELSPORT. As part of GELSPORT, Miller and Silver created a line of weighted training aids for hockey, lacrosse, and golf.

== See also ==
- List of select Jewish football players
