= Carlos Huerta =

American football player (born 1969)

No. 6, 8
- Position: Placekicker

Personal information
- Born: June 29, 1969 (age 57); Coral Gables, Florida, U.S.
- Listed height: 5 ft 7 in (1.70 m)
- Listed weight: 184 lb (83 kg)

Career information
- High school: Christopher Columbus (Miami, Florida)
- College: Miami (FL)
- NFL draft: 1992: 12th round, 315th overall pick

Career history
- San Diego Chargers (1992)*; Houston Oilers (1993)*; Las Vegas Posse (1994); Baltimore Stallions (1995); Chicago Bears (1996); St. Louis Rams (1996); Buffalo Bills (1997)*; Amsterdam Admirals (1997); Florida Bobcats (1998); Toronto Argonauts (1998); San Jose SaberCats (1999–2001)
- * Offseason or practice squad member only

Awards and highlights
- Grey Cup champion (1995); Jackie Parker Trophy (1994); 2× National champion (1989, 1991); Consensus All-American (1991); Second Team All-South Independent (1989, 1990)

Career NFL statistics
- Field goals made: 4
- Field goal attempts: 7
- Field goal %: 57.1
- Longest field goal: 42
- Stats at Pro Football Reference

Career AFL statistics
- Field goals made: 37
- Field goal attempts: 85
- Field goal %: 43.5
- Stats at ArenaFan.com

Carlos Antonio Huerta (born June 29, 1969) is an American former professional football player who was a placekicker in three different professional leagues. He played college football for the Miami Hurricanes, and was recognized as a consensus All-American. Huerta was selected by the San Diego Chargers in the twelfth round of the 1992 NFL draft, he played in the National Football League (NFL), Canadian Football League (CFL) and Arena Football League (AFL).

== Early life ==
Huerta was born in Coral Gables, Florida. He graduated from Christopher Columbus High School in Miami, Florida, and played for the Columbus Explorers high school football team.

== College career ==
Huerta attended the University of Miami, where he was a walk-on kicker for the Hurricanes teams from 1988 to 1991. During his four years as a starter, he led the Hurricanes in scoring. He still holds the Hurricanes career records for points after touchdowns (PATs), field goals, and total points, as well as the top three season records for consecutive PATs in a season, the top four season records for field goals, and the top three season records for points scored kicking and field goals in a game. As a senior in 1991, he was recognized as a consensus first-team All-American, having earned first-team honors from the Associated Press, the Walter Camp Football Foundation, Football News and The Sporting News.

He graduated from the university with a bachelor's degree in business administration, and was later inducted into the University of Miami Sports Hall of Fame.

While at Miami, he was given the nickname "the Iceman" because of how cool he stayed no matter what the situation.

== Professional career ==
Huerta joined the Las Vegas Posse, a Canadian Football League expansion franchise. He was one of the few notable players for the Posse, completing 38 of 46 field goal attempts, scoring 154 points. Following the season, he was the recipient of the Jackie Parker Trophy, and was the runner-up for the CFL's Most Outstanding Rookie Award. After the Las Vegas CFL franchise folded, he moved to the CFL's Baltimore Stallions, where he completed 57 field goals and scored 228 points, and was a key contributor to the Stallions' 1995 Grey Cup championship season. His 57 completed field goals remains the second highest season total in CFL history.

The National Football League followed in 1996. Huerta played 3 games with the Chicago Bears in 1996, hitting 4 of 7 field goals, and one game with the St. Louis Rams, scoring 2 extra points.

From 1998 to 2001 he played in the Arena Football League, with the Florida Bobcats in 1998 and the remainder with the San Jose SaberCats. He would connect on 37 of 85 field goals in the AFL. Also in 1998, Huerta appeared in a playoff game with the Toronto Argonauts of the Canadian Football League.

== Life after football ==
Huerta was interviewed about his time at the University of Miami for the documentary The U, which premiered December 12, 2009 on ESPN.

== See also ==
- 1991 College Football All-America Team
- List of University of Miami alumni
- Miami Hurricanes
