= Terry Evanshen Trophy =

- Awarded for: Canadian Football League East Division's most outstanding player
- Country: Canada
- First award: 1994
- Currently held by: Bo Levi Mitchell (HAM)

Highlights
- Most awards: 7: Anthony Calvillo

The Terry Evanshen Trophy is a trophy awarded to the Canadian Football League East Division's Most Outstanding Player, chosen from the nominees of each team in the division. Either this trophy winner or the winner of the Jeff Nicklin Memorial Trophy will also receive the Canadian Football League Most Outstanding Player Award.

The Evanshen Trophy was named for Terry Evanshen, who was a star wide receiver for the Montreal Alouettes, the Calgary Stampeders, the Hamilton Tiger-Cats and the Toronto Argonauts. After his retirement from football, Terry Evanshen was involved in a car crash in 1988 that nearly killed and caused him to have severe brain damage, which caused him to have memory loss. Evanshen was able to successfully overcome his battle with memory loss and lives a full life.

In 1994, the CFL adopted the Terry Evanshen Trophy to be awarded annually to the Most Outstanding Player of the East Division. The Terry Evanshen Trophy ended up replacing the Jeff Russel Memorial Trophy which was officially retired in 1994 at the request of the Russel family (it was re-established in 2003 to recognize the players in the Quebec conference of U Sports football, with the winner being nominated for the national Hec Crighton Trophy). As part of the failed American expansion in 1995, the trophy was awarded to the Most Outstanding Player of the South Division.

== Terry Evanshen Trophy winners ==
Bold indicates a player who went on to win the CFL's Most Outstanding Player Award

Year	Player	Position	Team
Terry Evanshen Trophy winners (1994—present)
1994	Mike Pringle	Running back	Baltimore CFLers
1995	**Mike Pringle**	Running back	Baltimore Stallions
1996	**Doug Flutie**	Quarterback	Toronto Argonauts
1997	**Doug Flutie**	Quarterback	Toronto Argonauts
1998	**Mike Pringle**	Running back	Montreal Alouettes
1999	**Danny McManus**	Quarterback	Hamilton Tiger-Cats
2000	Mike Pringle	Running back	Montreal Alouettes
2001	**Khari Jones**	Quarterback	Winnipeg Blue Bombers
2002	Anthony Calvillo	Quarterback	Montreal Alouettes
2003	**Anthony Calvillo**	Quarterback	Montreal Alouettes
2004	Anthony Calvillo	Quarterback	Montreal Alouettes
2005	**Damon Allen**	Quarterback	Toronto Argonauts
2006	Charles Roberts	Running back	Winnipeg Blue Bombers
2007	Kevin Glenn	Quarterback	Winnipeg Blue Bombers
2008	**Anthony Calvillo**	Quarterback	Montreal Alouettes
2009	**Anthony Calvillo**	Quarterback	Montreal Alouettes
2010	Anthony Calvillo	Quarterback	Montreal Alouettes
2011	Anthony Calvillo	Quarterback	Montreal Alouettes
2012	**Chad Owens**	Wide receiver/Kick returner	Toronto Argonauts
2013	Ricky Ray	Quarterback	Toronto Argonauts
2014	Ricky Ray	Quarterback	Toronto Argonauts
2015	**Henry Burris**	Quarterback	Ottawa Redblacks
2016	Ernest Jackson	Wide receiver	Ottawa Redblacks
2017	Ricky Ray	Quarterback	Toronto Argonauts
2018	Jeremiah Masoli	Quarterback	Hamilton Tiger-Cats
2019	**Brandon Banks**	Wide receiver	Hamilton Tiger-Cats
2020	season cancelled - covid 19		
2021	William Stanback	Running back	Montreal Alouettes
2022	Geno Lewis	Wide receiver	Montreal Alouettes
2023	**Chad Kelly**	Quarterback	Toronto Argonauts
2024	Bo Levi Mitchell	Quarterback	Hamilton Tiger-Cats
2025	Bo Levi Mitchell	Quarterback	Hamilton Tiger-Cats

See Jeff Russel Memorial Trophy to view other recipients of the Most Outstanding Player of the East Division.
