= James Foort =

Canadian inventor (1921–2020)

James Foort (December 10, 1921 – April 15, 2020) was a Canadian inventor, artist, and innovator in the field of prosthetic limbs.

== Early life ==
Foort was born in December 1921 in New Westminster, British Columbia.

In 1941, after spending his childhood as a fisherman and part-time high school student, he joined the Air Force as a wireless operator. When World War II ended, he attended the College of Victoria, where he finished his high school credits. He earned BASc and MASc degrees in Chemical Engineering at the University of Toronto, 1946 - 1951.

== Career in prosthetics ==
After earning degrees in chemical engineering, James joined Colin McLaurin, an Air Force veteran and aeronautical engineer, and Fred Hampton, a leader in the field of prosthetics, at Sunnybrooke Veteran's Hospital in Toronto in 1951, working for the department of Veteran's affairs. With the culmination of World War II, veterans across the world were complaining about the quality of their artificial limbs: "There was clearly a coalescence of national need and emotions [..] which] translated into a political will and funded programs within leading federal agencies in both Canada and the US." At the Sunnybrooke Hospital in Toronto, James helped to develop a prosthetic foot that, unlike any previous models, had no moving parts and essentially functioned like a rocker. In addition, inspired by complaints from fishermen, he replaced the raw hide used to protect the prosthesis with a plastic material that was more suited to withstand various elements such as moisture.

In 1953, James moved to the University of California, Berkeley, where, working with C.W. Radcliff, he helped to develop the quadrilateral socket by developing a jig fitting system for amputations above the knee. Unlike previous technology, these jigs held the correct position of the residual limb, therefore making fitting of the socket for the residual limb easier and more comfortable for amputees to walk. The work that James Foort did at Berkeley remains the basis of contemporary prosthetic alignment according to some in the field. In addition to developing the quadrilateral socket, the team at Berkeley systematized the prosthesis developed by Colin MacLaurin and Fred Hampton for total absence of the limb. The Berkeley team developed the PTB Below knee prosthesis for amputations below the knee. Using completely new technologies, the PTB prosthesis enabled the amputee to walk around with no corset or side joints. Not only did these new adaptations solve the problem of constriction of circulation and ease restriction on the thigh, but it allowed people to be amputated below the knee twice as was usual for amputations related to circulatory problems, thereby increasing their function.

James returned to Canada in 1963, where living and working in Winnipeg, he developed a modular system of lower extremity prosthetics. This ‘tinker toy’ system, as he describes it, meant that instead of long delays in the process of making, adjusting, and replacing prosthetics, it could now be done extremely quickly because each of the parts could fit easily into one another. Everything had to be sculpted before.

In 1971, James moved to Vancouver where, with a team of engineers, he developed a computer program to fit artificial limbs. The program provided a means of making the shape of the socket, which would then be used to program the machine that carved the shape. His modular ‘tinker toy’ system would then be used to put the prosthesis together. The computer system would later be known as CAD-CAM (computer aided design and manufacture). CAD-CAM was developed, and later improved, by prosthetics companies such as Bio-Sculptor. James Foort never attempted to patent any of his technological breakthroughs in pursuit of profit, which made the technology more affordable and easily accessible.

In 2009 he was awarded an honorary Doctor of Science from Queen's University Ontario.

== Personal life ==
Foort retired in December 1986 and latterly lived in Vancouver where he wrote an opera and spent his time doing art, writing, and urban farming.

He died in April 2020 at the age of 98.
