= Baltimore Stallions =

Former Canadian football team based in Baltimore, Maryland

- Logo
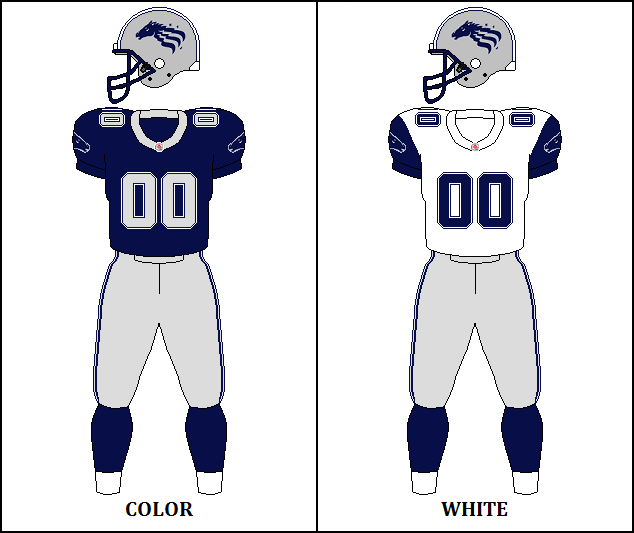
- Uniforms

General information
- Founded: 1994
- Folded: 1995
- Stadium: Memorial Stadium
- Headquartered: Baltimore, Maryland, U.S.
- Colors: Royal blue, silver, black, and white

Personnel
- Owner: Jim Speros
- General manager: Jim Popp
- Head coach: Don Matthews

League / conference affiliations
- Canadian Football League: East Division (1994); South Division (1995)

Championships
- Grey Cup wins: 1; 1 (1995)
- Division championships: 2 (1994, 1995)

The Baltimore Stallions (known officially as the "Baltimore Football Club" and previously as the "Baltimore CFL Colts" in its inaugural season) were a Canadian Football League team based in Baltimore, Maryland, in the United States, which played the 1994 and 1995 seasons. They were the most successful American team in the CFL's southern expansion into the United States, and by at least one account, the most successful expansion team in North American professional sports history at the time. They had winning records in each season, and in both years advanced to the Grey Cup Final. In 1995, they became the only American franchise to win the Grey Cup.

In the final weeks of the Stallions' second season, it became public knowledge that the Maryland Stadium Authority and City of Baltimore were in serious negotiations with Art Modell, the long-time owner of the Cleveland Browns of the National Football League (NFL), to move his franchise to Baltimore for the 1996 season. Stallions owner Jim Speros knew his team could not begin to directly compete with the overwhelmingly more popular NFL brand. Even before the agreement with Modell became official within a month of the Stallions' Grey Cup triumph, he was actively seeking to re-locate his team elsewhere.

Speros ultimately chose to move his football organization to Montreal and reconstitute it as the third and current iteration of the Montreal Alouettes. The Stallions franchise was dissolved, thus becoming one of three Grey Cup champions in the modern era to subsequently fold (the others being the Ottawa Rough Riders and the original Alouettes). The CFL considers the Stallions to be a separate franchise from the Alouettes.

== History ==
For some 30 years, Baltimore had been home to the Baltimore Colts, a popular NFL team that suddenly moved overnight to Indianapolis in 1984. The former Philadelphia Stars of the United States Football League (USFL) nominally represented Baltimore in spring 1985. However, after being blocked from Memorial Stadium, the Colts' old home, due to objections from the Baltimore Orioles in Major League Baseball, they were forced to play well outside the city bounds in College Park. The Stars had planned to move to Memorial Stadium in fall 1986, but the league failed before this could happen.

In the years after the Colts left, Baltimore made two serious bids to get another NFL team. It heavily wooed the St. Louis Cardinals football team owned by the Bidwill family, but they ultimately moved to Phoenix, Arizona as the Phoenix (later Arizona) Cardinals. In 1993, an ownership group failed to win an NFL expansion franchise, the Baltimore Bombers.

Soon after the expansion effort failed, entrepreneur and former Washington Redskins assistant Jim Speros was granted a CFL expansion franchise for Baltimore that would play in Memorial Stadium. Attempting to trade on the city's love for the Colts, he invited the old Baltimore Colts Marching Band, which had stayed together along with the old team's uniformed cheerleaders for over a decade, to play at his games. He recruited the remaining Baltimore Colts football fan clubs ("Colt Corrals") to follow and support the new CFL franchise.

Speros initially called the team the "Baltimore CFL Colts". Although the CFL club had adopted a color scheme that added silver to the Baltimore Colts' traditional colors of blue and white, as well as a stylized horse's head logo that bore no resemblance to the Baltimore/Indianapolis Colts' established horseshoe logo, the NFL nevertheless went to court and successfully obtained a legal injunction against the franchise's use of any iteration of "Colts" in their name just hours before the team was to play its first game. Speros not only had to discard tons of purchased merchandise and souvenirs along with an advertising campaign, but also had to quickly change the franchise's official name to the "Baltimore Football Club," which some just called the "Baltimore CFL's." While this was the first occasion in the modern era that a North American professional sports team operated without an official nickname, it has been repeated by several franchises since, including the aforementioned Redskins (now the Commanders) in nearby Washington, D.C. when, after decades of complaints and pressure from Indigenous American advocates, they dropped their original nickname and temporarily became the "Washington Football Team" before their current name was chosen.

Speros kept the team's distinctive horse's head logo with the expectation that local fans, long disillusioned with the NFL, would be disinclined to stop referring to the team as the "Baltimore Colts." The team tacitly encouraged this sentiment to the extent they were legally permitted to do so. For example, for most of the 1994 season, Memorial Stadium's public address announcer, Jack Taylor, would announce the team as "your Baltimore CFL..." – followed by a pause, during which time the crowd shouted "COLTS!" – after which he would conclude, "...football team."

Number 19 was never issued out of respect to the Baltimore Colts' great Johnny Unitas.

=== 1994 season ===
Speros' approach to building the team was simple. He knew Canadian football was very different from the American game, so he made a point of hiring personnel and players with CFL experience. In contrast, the other American CFL teams stocked their rosters with former NFL players, former college football players, and locally-known players. Speros hired career CFL assistant Jim Popp as general manager, and named longtime CFL coach Don Matthews as head coach. Popp and Matthews, in turn, brought in experienced CFL players like QB Tracy Ham, RB Mike Pringle, LB O. J. Brigance, DT Jearld Baylis, DE Elfrid Payton. One of the more prominent NFL castoffs was K Donald Igwebuike; the team also offered a tryout to former Super Bowl XXII champion, Timmy Smith, who had been out of football several years by that point, but Smith failed to make the regular season roster. It also helped that Memorial Stadium had been originally built to accommodate baseball as well as football (moreover, by then the Orioles had vacated the venue for Camden Yards, thus making Memorial Stadium fully available for the CFL's summer-to-fall schedule). Using Memorial Stadium's baseball seating configuration gave it a field large enough to accommodate the full 150-yard length and 65-yard width of a regulation CFL field.

Even though they lacked an official name, the team finished second in the CFL East Division, with a 12–6 regular season record – more wins than any CFL expansion team before or since. In addition, the team was ranked third in the entire CFL in team scoring, and second in team defense.

Mike Pringle was the team's offensive standout. Among other accomplishments, he earned the league's leading rushing title with a record 1,972 yards and thirteen touchdowns. Pringle also returned 38 kicks for 814 yards, which made him a CFL All-Star, Eastern All-Star, and a Terry Evanshen Trophy winner.

In the playoffs, Baltimore hosted the Toronto Argonauts in the East semifinals at Memorial Stadium and won the game, 34–15. After the semifinal game, Baltimore ended up defeating the favored Winnipeg Blue Bombers at Winnipeg Stadium 14–12 to become the first (and only) American and expansion team to make it to the Grey Cup.

In the Grey Cup game, Baltimore was up against the B.C. Lions at BC Place Stadium in what amounted to a road game. Baltimore had the upper hand against the Lions, leading 17–10 at halftime and silencing the Lions' faithful; however, the Lions came back in the second half, winning by a score of 26–23 on a last-second Lui Passaglia field goal.

In the Homicide: Life on the Street episode, "Every Mother's Son", the team honors detectives from the show's fictional homicide unit. Mayor Kurt Schmoke also appears in the scene.

=== 1995 season ===
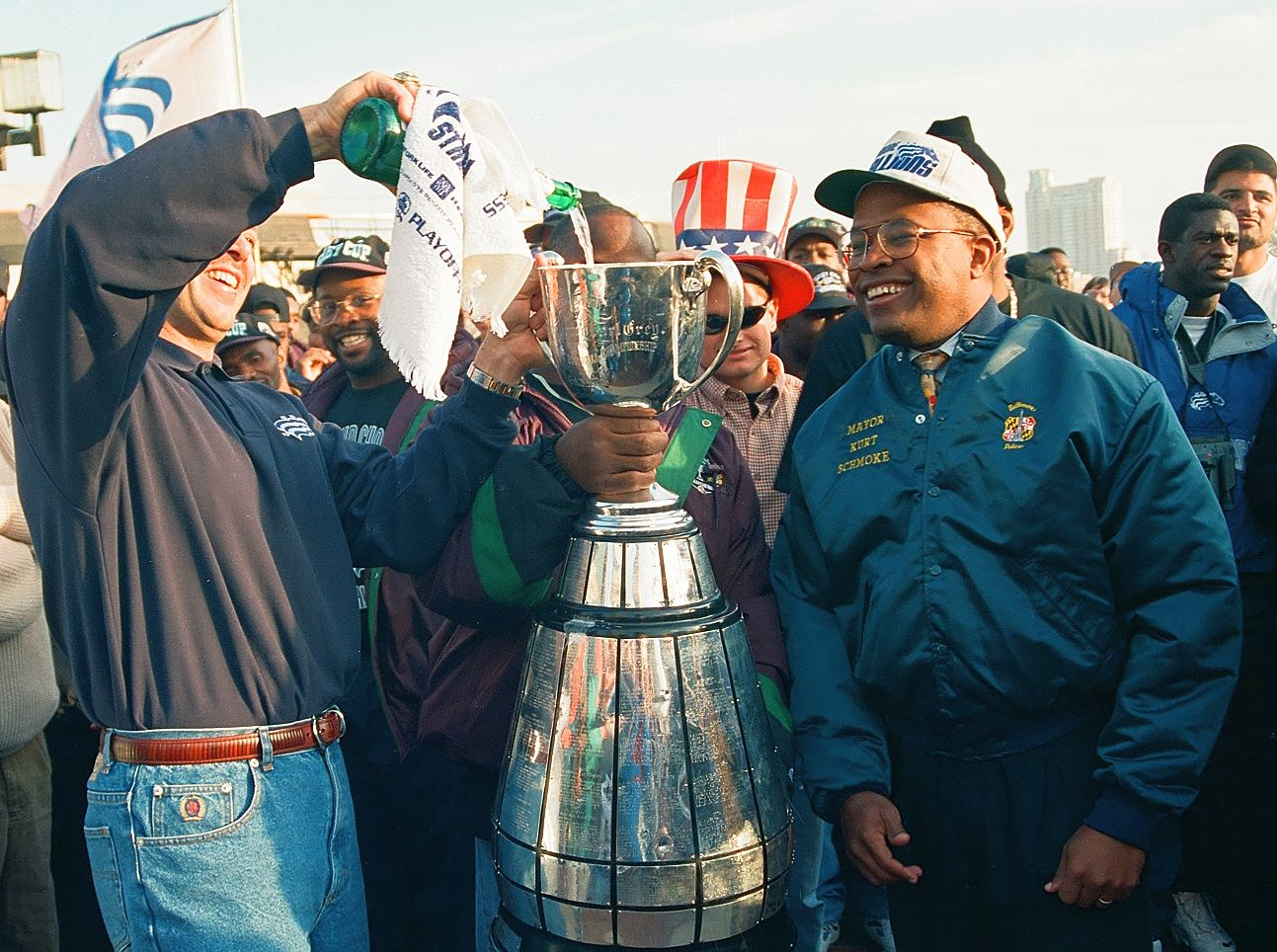
The Grey Cup on display after the Baltimore Stallions victory with city mayor Kurt Schmoke

After the 1994 season, the CFL announced that the League's five U.S. teams—Baltimore, the San Antonio Texans (the former Sacramento Gold Miners), the Shreveport Pirates and the expansion Memphis Mad Dogs and Birmingham Barracudas—would be placed in a new South Division, while the Canadian teams would reside in the North Division. Just before the start of the 1995 season, a name-the-team fan poll was held to decide a new team name. After the team finished the first week of its second season still calling itself "the Baltimore Football Club", the fan poll ended; Speros publicly announced that Baltimore's team would be known as the "Baltimore Stallions". The name change was a convenient one in that it allowed Baltimore's logo and colors to remain unchanged from the 1994 season. Notably, the Stallions nickname had previously been used by a United States Football League team in Birmingham, nevertheless it was still available for Speros' team. Barracudas owner Art Williams had previously rejected reviving the moniker for his club, apparently because he considered it too timid (Birmingham would later reclaim the nickname for its reconstituted USFL/UFL franchise in the 2020s).

Despite the changes to their name and team re-alignment, the Stallions returned with virtually the same roster for their next season. The exception was the signing of former Posse kicker Carlos Huerta to replace Igwebuike, who moved on to play with Memphis. With essentially the same team from the 1994 season, optimism and Grey Cup expectations were high for the Stallions. Optimism became reality as Baltimore continued their on-field dominance from the previous season. They started the season 2–3, but did not lose another game for the rest of the season. They ultimately finished with a 15–3 regular season record – first place in the South Division, and tying the Calgary Stampeders for the best record in the CFL.

Quarterback Tracy Ham with Mike Pringle and Robert Drummond were the most potent backfield in the CFL. Chris Armstrong became the team's top receiver and the defense continued dominating opponents by allowing only 369 points-against, ranking the squad third in team defense. Mike Pringle had a slight drop-off from his 1994 numbers by rushing for 1,791 yards, being named the CFL's Most Outstanding Player.

After defeating Winnipeg 36–21 in the divisional semifinals, the Stallions defeated the Texans 21–11 in the South final in what is (as of the 2024 season) the last meaningful CFL game played in the United States. This vaulted them to the Grey Cup final for the second straight season. They traveled to Regina's Taylor Field to face the 15–3 North Division champion Stampeders, who were led by coach Wally Buono, QB Doug Flutie, and his two top receivers, Allen Pitts and Dave Sapunjis. During the game, the winds at Taylor Field were particularly strong and gusted up to 85 km/h (52.8 mph). That did not slow down the Stallions, as they defeated the Stampeders, 37–20 to become the first American team to win the Grey Cup, with Tracy Ham becoming the Grey Cup's Most Valuable Player. Counting the playoffs, the Stallions ended the season on a 16-game winning streak.

=== Fan support ===
In addition to being the most successful of the U.S. CFL teams on the field, Baltimore was far and away the most successful of the CFL's American teams at the box office. It had significant fan support and strong attendance – averaging 37,347 in 1994 (best in the CFL), and 30,112 in 1995 (second best).

Fan support in Baltimore was driven by a number of factors not present in the CFL's other U.S. markets. Their success on the field was one obvious factor. However many fans were motivated to support the CFL out of antipathy towards the NFL, which had not only backed the re-location of the NFL Colts to Indianapolis, but had subsequently spurned several attempts to return an NFL franchise to the city. Another major factor in Baltimore's success at the gate was the 1994–95 Major League Baseball strike, which wiped out the last two months of the Orioles' season. Baltimore was also a significantly more heavily populated market than the other CFL American markets and the only one to have previously hosted an NFL team, giving the Stallions a larger base from which to draw fans. Finally, the Stallions did not have to compete with college football for an audience to nearly the same extent as the other U.S. CFL franchises.

=== In the end ===
After the 1995 season, the CFL decided to disband three of its five American franchises and return to its traditional East–West divisional alignment for the 1996 season. The two remaining American teams, Baltimore and San Antonio, were to be placed in the CFL's East Division.

However, this strategy collapsed on the week of the South Division final, when longtime Cleveland Browns owner Art Modell announced he would be moving his team to Baltimore. Speros had initially not believed the rumors of Modell courting Baltimore when they cropped up in September. However, when it emerged that Modell was in talks with state and local officials, Speros began scouting out cities for a possible move.

This proved prescient; as soon as the move was announced, local support for the Stallions dried up almost overnight, with fans switching virtually en masse to the NFL. It quickly became apparent that most Stallions fans had only supported the CFL out of resentment towards the NFL, or even just as a means of pressuring the NFL to return. Whatever the case, the loss of support was so dramatic that the Stallions were forced to basically give away tickets for the South Division final. Even the Grey Cup victory celebration at Inner Harbor went almost unnoticed in the local media and press, despite a few local dignitaries such as Mayor Kurt Schmoke attending.

Even after the NFL's return to Baltimore became certain, Schmoke and other city leaders claimed that the Stallions could coexist with Modell's team, which was eventually reconstituted as the Baltimore Ravens. However, Speros and CFL officials soon realized that no matter how successful the Stallions had been, they had no realistic prospect of competing head-to-head with an NFL team. As the team's successful Grey Cup run was still underway, it became apparent that there would not be enough advertising revenue or fan support to go around. Even without that to consider, the Stallions would have been left without a suitable place to play. The Stallions faced almost certain eviction from Memorial Stadium, so the Ravens could use it as a temporary home pending completion of a new stadium. Even without that to consider, the Stallions would still have faced severe logistical problems once the NFL season started in August. Even if those could have been overcome, the stipulations the NFL imposed to allow Memorial Stadium to be used as a temporary facility would have made it almost impossible for the venue to convert its grass field back and forth between the two leagues' configurations when their seasons overlapped. No other stadium in the Baltimore area was large, or suitable, enough, even for temporary CFL use.

Facing an untenable situation in Baltimore, Speros ceded Baltimore to the Ravens and announced plans to move the franchise. As he later put it, the Stallions would have effectively been relegated to "minor league" status had they decided to stick it out in Baltimore. Speros was actually very close to moving the franchise to Houston, Texas to take advantage of the pending departure of the NFL's recently departed Houston Oilers from the Astrodome, with then-Houston Astros owner Drayton McLane as a minority partner. However, under prodding from CFL officials who believed the American experiment was a lost cause, Speros began talks with officials in Montreal. CFL commissioner Larry Smith believed the defending CFL champions would be a better vehicle for bringing the CFL back to Montreal rather than what would have essentially been an expansion team. At a league meeting on February 2, 1996; Speros was granted permission to move the Stallions to Montreal, effectively ending the American experiment. Although Speros seriously considered whether to keep the Stallions name, he ultimately decided to give up the Stallions franchise and reconstitute his organization as the third and current incarnation of the Montreal Alouettes. Speros kept the revived Alouettes for only one year before selling the franchise to Robert C. Wetenhall in 1997.

Sixteen former Baltimore Stallions players earned tryouts for NFL teams in 1996.

=== Historical note ===
The CFL does not officially consider the Stallions to be part of the Alouettes' history. According to official league records, Speros canceled the Stallions franchise after the 1995 season, and reclaimed the dormant Alouettes franchise. Consequently, when Speros moved the team to Montreal, all of the Stallions players were released from their contracts, though Popp managed to re-sign many of them. The current Alouettes claim the history of the 1946–1986 Alouettes (including their stint as the Concordes from 1982 to 1985) as their own, and the CFL has retconned the Alouettes as having suspended operations from 1987 to 1995.

Nineteen members of the Stallions roster were signed by the Alouettes in 1996, notably including Tracy Ham, Mike Pringle, and Elfrid Payton. When Montreal next won the Grey Cup in 2002, two former Stallions players were still on the roster, namely Pringle and offensive lineman Neal Fort, who was also the final Stallions player with the Alouettes franchise upon his retirement in 2004. The last Stallions player active in the CFL was defensive end Demetrious Maxie, who retired as a member of the Calgary Stampeders in 2007.

On 28 March 2025, the last link between the Stallions and Alouettes–team president and CEO Mark Weightman–left the latter organization. General manager Jim Popp followed the team to Montreal as general manager and guided the franchise to 8 Grey Cup Finals, winning 3 of them – giving him a total of 10 Grey Cup Final appearances and 4 Grey Cups with the Stallions/Alouettes organization. Weightman was an operations intern for the Stallions in 1995 and then joined the Alouettes as an operations staffer in 1996. In December 2013, having already been the COO and de facto CEO for some 18 months, Weightman was promoted to club president and CEO. Popp resigned as general manager at the end of the team's 2016 season, and Weightman was replaced by Patrick Boivin in December of that year. He would make an unexpected return to his role in April 2023, before retiring again two years later.

== Roster and accomplishments ==
Baltimore Stallions 1994 roster
| Quarterbacks: 8 Tracy Ham*; 13 Dan Crowley*; 15 John Congemi*; 10 Shawn Jones*; Running backs: 27 Mike Pringle* RB; 20 Sheldon Canley* RB; 2 Robert Drummond* FB; 32 Peter Tuipulotu* FB; Wide receivers: 84 Walter Wilson* WR; 86 Robert Clark* WR; 1 Eddie Britton* WR; 5 Shannon Culver* WR; 80 Joe Washington* SB; 85 Shawn Beals* SB; 81 Chris Armstrong* SB; 5 Mike Alexander* SB; XX Reggie Perry* SB; XX James Guarantano* SB | Offensive linemen: 68 Shar Pourdanesh* T; 66 Neal Fort* T; 60 John Earle* T; 64 Antonio London* G; 62 Keith Ballard* G; 63 Guy Earle* G; 61 O'Neill Glenn* G; 51 Nick Subis* C; Defensive linemen: 98 Jerald Baylis* NT; 64 Scott Miller* DT; 71 Brent White* DT; 99 Malcolm Showell* DT; 67 Tom Fuhler* DT; 56 Elfrid Payton* DE; 72 Robert Presbury* DE; 54 Grant Carter* DE | Linebackers: 4 Alvin Walton* LB; 38 Ken Benson* LB; 59 O. J. Brigance* LB; 50 Ernest Fields* LB; 39 Matt Goodwin* LB; 7 Tracy Gravely* LB; 35 Michael Kerr* LB; 55 Malcolm Goodwin* LB; 54 Melendez Byrd* LB; XX Ricky Andrews* LB; 32 Jesse Becton* LB; 38 William King* LB; Defensive backs: 3 Karl Anthony* CB; 21 Irvin Smith* CB; 37 Kwame Smith* CB; 9 Charles Anthony* HB; 33 Ken Watson* HB; 6 Stan Petry* HB; 17 Michael Brooks* S; 36 Lester Smith* S; Special teams: 0 Donald Igwebuike K; 22 Josh Miller P; rookies in italics 40 Active, 13 Developmental |

=== Canadian Football Hall of Fame ===
- 8 Tracy Ham, inducted in 2010, Quarterback 1994–1995, won 83rd Grey Cup
- 27 Mike Pringle, inducted in 2008, Running back 1994–1995, won 83rd Grey Cup
- 56 Elfrid Payton, inducted in 2010, Defensive end 1994–1995, won 83rd Grey Cup
- Don Matthews, inducted in 2011, Head Coach 1994–1995, won 83rd Grey Cup

=== Awards and accomplishments ===
==== 1994 ====
Divisional Awards

- Most Valuable Player of the East Division – Mike Pringle (RB)
- Most Outstanding Rookie of the East Division – Matt Goodwin (DB)
- Most Outstanding Offensive Lineman Award of the East Division – Shar Pourdanesh (OT)

CFL awards

- CFL's Most Outstanding Offensive Lineman Award – Shar Pourdanesh (OT)
- CFL's Most Outstanding Rookie Award – Matt Goodwin (DB)
- CFLPA's Most Outstanding Community Service Award – O. J. Brigance (LB)
- CFL's Coach of the Year – Don Matthews
- Grey Cup's Most Valuable Player – Karl Anthony (CB)

1994 Eastern All-Stars

Offense

- Mike Pringle (RB)
- Peter Tuipulotu (FB)
- Chris Armstrong (SB)
- Nick Subis (C)
- Shar Pourdanesh (OT)

Defense

- Irvin Smith (CB)
- Michael Brooks (DS)

Special Teams

- Josh Miller (P)

1994 CFL All-Stars

Offense

- Mike Pringle (RB)
- Shar Pourdanesh (OT)

Defense

- Irvin Smith (CB)

Special Teams

- Josh Miller (P)

==== 1995 ====
Divisional Awards

- Most Valuable Player of the East Division – Mike Pringle (RB)
- Most Outstanding Rookie of the East Division – Chris Wright (WR)
- Most Outstanding Offensive Lineman Award of the East Division – Mike Withycombe (OG)

CFL awards

- CFL's Most Outstanding Player Award – Mike Pringle (RB)
- CFL's Most Outstanding Offensive Lineman Award – Mike Withycombe (OG)
- CFL's Coach of the Year – Don Matthews
- Grey Cup's Most Valuable Player – Tracy Ham (QB)

1995 Southern All-Stars

Offense

- Mike Pringle (RB)
- Chris Armstrong (SB)
- Mike Withycombe (OG)
- Shar Pourdanesh (OT)
- Neal Fort (OT)

Defense

- Jerald Baylis (DT)
- Elfrid Payton (DE)
- Tracy Gravely (LB)
- O. J. Brigance (LB)
- Irvin Smith (CB)
- Charles Anthony (DB)

Special Teams

- Josh Miller (P)
- Chris Wright (ST)

1995 CFL All-Stars

Offense

- Mike Pringle (RB)
- Mike Withycombe (OG)
- Neal Fort (OT)

Defense

- Jerald Baylis (DT)
- O. J. Brigance (LB)
- Irvin Smith (CB)
- Charles Anthony (DB)

Special Teams

- Josh Miller (P)
- Chris Wright (ST)

== Television and radio announcers ==
| Year | Television station | Television play-by-play | Television color commentator | Radio station | Radio play-by-play | Radio color commentator |
|---|---|---|---|---|---|---|
| 1995 | WMAR | Scott Garceau | Tom Matte | WJFK | Bruce Cunningham | Joe Washington |
| 1994 | WMAR | Scott Garceau | Tom Matte | WJFK | Bruce Cunningham | Joe Washington |

== See also ==
- CFL USA all-time records and statistics
- Comparison of Canadian and American football
- 1994 CFL season
- 1995 CFL season
- 82nd Grey Cup
- 83rd Grey Cup
