= O. J. Brigance =

American football player (1969–2026)

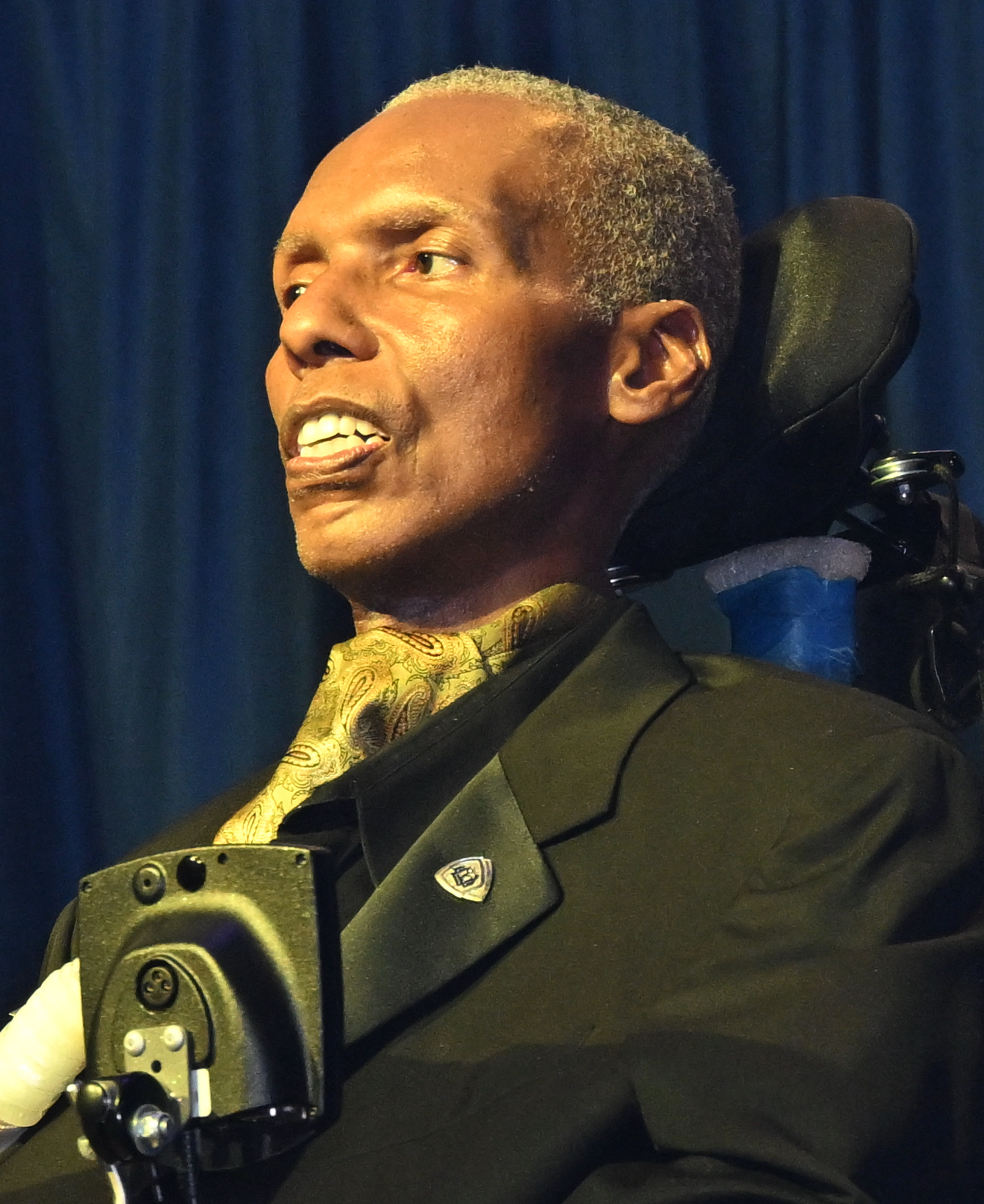
- Brigance in 2023

No. 58, 57, 59
- Position: Linebacker

Personal information
- Born: September 29, 1969; Houston, Texas, U.S.
- Died: August 17, 2026 (aged 56); Baltimore, Maryland, U.S.
- Listed height: 6 ft 0 in (1.83 m)
- Listed weight: 236 lb (107 kg)

Career information
- High school: Willowridge (Houston)
- College: Rice
- NFL draft: 1991: undrafted

Career history
- BC Lions (1991–1993); Baltimore Stallions (1994–1995); Miami Dolphins (1996–1999); Baltimore Ravens (2000); St. Louis Rams (2001); New England Patriots (2002); St. Louis Rams (2002)

Awards and highlights
- Super Bowl champion (XXXV); Grey Cup champion (1995); CFL All-Star (1995); First-team All-SWC (1990); Second-team All-SWC (1989); NCAA Inspiration Award (2016); George Halas Award (2015); Tom Pate Memorial Award (1994)

Career NFL statistics
- Games played: 98
- Tackles: 21
- Stats at Pro Football Reference

Orenthial James Brigance (September 29, 1969 – August 17, 2026) was an American professional football player who was a linebacker in the Canadian Football League (CFL) and the National Football League (NFL). He was a Grey Cup champion with the Baltimore Stallions in 1995, and won Super Bowl XXXV with the Baltimore Ravens in 2001. He played college football for the Rice Owls.

== Early life and college ==
Orenthial James Brigance was born on September 29, 1969, in Willowridge, Houston, Texas. His mother named him after her favorite football player O. J. Simpson, but added the letter "i" to his name for originality. He played football at Willowridge High School in Houston, where he played center. He received only one Division I college football scholarship offer, at Rice University, where he was offered a spot to play linebacker on defense because he was too small to play at the center position at the Division I level. He accepted the offer and was a three-year starter for the Owls. At the time of his death in 2026, Brigance was their leader in career tackles with 367. He graduated from Rice with a degree in managerial studies in 1992.

== Professional career ==
Beginning his pro career as a linebacker in the CFL with the BC Lions in 1991, Brigance played three seasons and 54 games. His best season came in 1993, when he recorded 20 sacks and was a CFL West All-Star. Brigance then played for the CFL's Baltimore Stallions for two seasons, becoming a CFL All-Star in 1995, while recording seven sacks and helping his team become the first and only American team to win the Grey Cup.

In 1996, Brigance was signed by the NFL's Miami Dolphins as a free agent. He was twice voted a team captain during his four seasons there and his teammates named him Ed Block Courage Award recipient in 1999 following a severe back injury. In addition, he was honored with the NFL Players Association's "Unsung Hero Award" that same season.

The next year, Brigance was signed by the Baltimore Ravens. He was a key contributor to the Ravens' championship-winning team leading up to the Super Bowl XXXV, finishing with 25 special teams tackles prior to the championship and serving as special teams captain. In the Super Bowl game, Brigance made the first tackle, stopping the Giants' Ron Dixon on the opening kickoff. Overall, he had four special teams tackles in the championship game. Brigance played for the St. Louis Rams in 2001 and 2002. He was signed by the New England Patriots on August 12, 2002, and released on August 27. He was re-signed in September and played in one game. He signed later that month with the Rams.

He is one of several players to have won both a CFL and NFL championship, and the only player in the history of both leagues to win those championships for the same city.

During his time as a Dolphin, Brigance was involved in a number of different community organizations, including Habitat for Humanity, Cystic Fibrosis Foundation and the Daily Food Bank.

=== Post-playing career ===
Brigance was the director of player development for the Ravens from 2004 until his death in 2026. In 2005, he received the NFL's Winston/Shell Award.

== Personal life and death ==
In May 2007, Brigance was diagnosed with ALS. He created a foundation to assist ALS research called the Brigance Brigade Foundation. In 2008, he became ALS ambassador for the Robert Packard Center, an ALS research center at Johns Hopkins University. For his ALS activism, Brigance was one of two recipients of the 2016 NCAA Inspiration Award, along with former Mount St. Joseph University basketball player Lauren Hill, who had pediatric cancer and died in 2015.

Brigance married Chanda around 1995. He became a Christian in college. He died from complications of ALS in Baltimore on August 17, 2026, at the age of 56.
