= Pascual Fort =

Catalan enameller and printmaker

- Born: October 14, 1927; Reus, Catalonia, Spain
- Died: December 10, 1991 (aged 64); Barcelona, Spain
- Occupations: Printmaker, entrepreneur, gallery owner, enameller

Pascual Fort Pascual (Reus, 1927 - Barcelona, 1991) son of writer Jaume Fort i Prats, was a Catalan enameller, printmaker and gallery owner.

From a family of goldsmiths and silversmiths (Joieria Fort in Reus) Pascual Fort dedicated himself to artistic experimentation through printmaking, enamel and reliefs. He settled in Tarragona, where he founded the Galeria Fort, which the artist kept open for ten years (1964-1973) on the Rambla Nova, with his wife Mercè Barberà i Rusiñol. He was part of the artistic groups Cercle Pere Joan and Grup de Tarragona. He soon gained prestige in promoting the innovative art of the time. Both renowned artists (Miró, Rouault...) and promising young people from the Camp de Tarragona exhibited in the gallery. The chronicles of the various events and exhibitions were often collected by collectors and critics such as René Metras, Cirici Pellicer, J. E. Cirlot, Corredor-Matheos, Giralt-Miracle, Miralles and others, interested in the trend of the Pascual Fort gallery.

Pascual Fort and his wife spent several stays in New York —in those times already considered the artistic capital of the world— during the years 1965, 1966 and 1969. In 1965 he set up a workshop in that city, together with Núria Musté, also from Reus. Fort was awarded by the Brooklyn Museum and awarded a scholarship by the Institute of International Education in recognition of his work as an avant-garde artist and promoter.

In 1973, the Fort Barberà couple and their four children moved to Barcelona and Cadaqués. In 1978 Fort won the first prize at the III International Enamel Biennial in Limoges, with an enamel mural of 148 x 128 cm. He exhibited again in New York in 1976.

In 1981, he conceived and carried out the first Mini Print International of Cadaqués, still in force thanks to the drive of his widow. This competition annually invites printmakers from all over the world to take part with works sized 10 x 10 cm (3.9 x 3.9 in). The works of the winners of the previous year, and of all the participants of the current year are exhibited annually during the summer months at the Taller Galeria Fort in Cadaqués and then the exhibition makes an itinerant circuit through several cities of the world.

== Bibliography ==
- Pascual Fort: esmalts, gravats, relleus. Tarragona: La Diputació, 1997. ISBN 8488618425
