= Charles Fort (poet) =

American poet (born 1951)

- Born: 1951 (age 74–75); New Britain, Connecticut, U.S.
- Education: Bowling Green State University (MFA)
- Occupation: Poet

Charles Fort (born 1951 New Britain, Connecticut) is an American poet.

== Life ==
Fort graduated from Bowling Green State University with an MFA in 1977. He taught at the University of Nebraska at Kearney as The Distinguished Paul W. Reynolds and Clarice Kingston Reynolds Endowed Chair in Poetry (1997–2007), and Xavier University of Louisiana.

His work has appeared in Callaloo, The Georgia Review, Connecticut Writer's Anthology, Road Apple Review, White lade, and Argo.

== Awards ==
- 1994 winner of the Open Voice Award by The Writer's Voice
- MacDowell Fellowship
- Poetry Society of America award
- 1985 Randall Jarrell Poetry Prize
- The Mary Carolyn Davis Memorial Award

== Works ==
- "American Gargoyle", Oyster Boy Review 13
- "The Magic Man Held a Blue Crystal Ball", Oyster Boy Review 13
- Afro Psalms, University of Nebraska at Kearney Press
- Frankenstein Was a Negro. Morris Pub. February 1, 2002. ISBN 978-0-9674123-1-3.
- "In Memoriam (For My Wife, Wendy Fort)". Charles Fort (Poet).
- Immortelles: poems. University of Nebraska Press at Kearney. 2000.
- Darvil: prose poems. St. Andrews Press. 1993. ISBN 978-0-932662-58-3.
- The town clock burning: poems. St. Andrews Press. 1985. ISBN 978-0-932662-54-5.
- We Did Not Fear The Father: New and Selected Poems (Red Hen Press, 2021)
- Mrs Belladonna's Supper Club Waltz (Backwaters Press)

=== Anthologies ===
- Yusef Komunyakaa; David Lehman, eds. (2003). "The Vagrant Hours". The Best American poetry. Simon and Schuster. ISBN 978-0-7432-0388-3.
