= 83rd Grey Cup =

1995 Canadian Football championship game

Baltimore Stallions	Calgary Stampeders
(15–3)	(15–3)
37	20
Head coach: Don Matthews	Head coach: Wally Buono
	1	2	3	4	Total
Baltimore Stallions	7	16	8	6	37
Calgary Stampeders	6	7	7	0	20
- Date: November 19, 1995
- Stadium: Taylor Field
- Location: Regina
- Most Valuable Player: Tracy Ham, QB (Stallions)
- Most Valuable Canadian: Dave Sapunjis, SB (Stampeders)
- Halftime show: Jack Semple
- Attendance: 52,064

Broadcasters
- Network: Canada: CBC, RDS; USA: ESPN2
- Announcers: (CBC) Steve Armitage, Don Wittman, Danny Kepley, Brian Williams, Mark Lee, Glen Suitor (ESPN2) Gus Johnson, Mike Mayock, Lisa Bowes

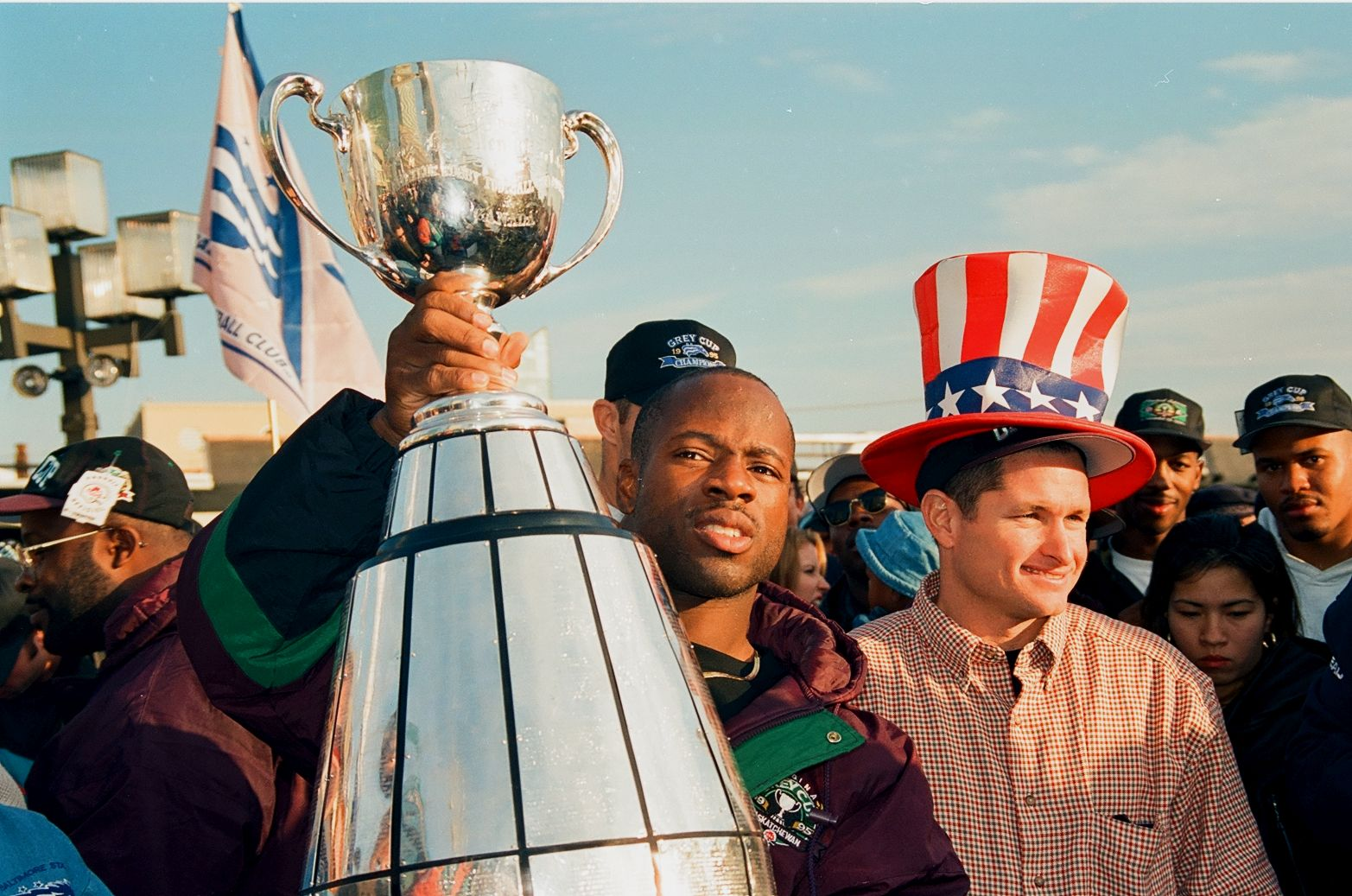
Victory celebration in Baltimore

The 83rd Grey Cup, also known as The Wind Bowl, was the 1995 Canadian Football League championship game played between the Baltimore Stallions and the Calgary Stampeders at Taylor Field in Regina, Saskatchewan. The Stallions defeated the Stampeders by a score 37–20 to win their first, and only, Grey Cup title. The Stallions' victory over the Stampeders marked the only time that an American-based team had won the Grey Cup.

== Game summary ==
Baltimore Stallions (37) - TDs, Chris Wright, Alvin Walton, Tracy Ham; FGs, Carlos Huerta (5); cons., Huerta (3); singles, Josh Miller (1).

Calgary Stampeders (20) - TDs, Marvin Pope, Doug Flutie; FGs, Mark McLoughlin (2); cons., McLoughlin (2).

First quarter
BAL - TD Wright 82-yard punt return (Huerta convert) 2:26
CAL - FG McLoughlin 35-yard field goal 7:19
CAL - FG McLoughlin 32-yard field goal 14:21
Second quarter
CAL - TD Pope 2-yard pass from Flutie (McLoughlin convert) 0:39
BAL - FG Huerta 30-yard field goal 2:51
BAL - TD Walton 4-yard fumble return (Huerta convert) 7:21
BAL - FG Huerta 45-yard field goal 9:49
BAL - FG Huerta 53-yard field goal 13:30
Third quarter
BAL - Single Miller 70-yard punt through end zone 1:06
CAL - TD Flutie 1-yard run (McLoughlin convert) 7:58
BAL - TD Ham 13-yard run (Huerta convert) 12:47
Fourth quarter
BAL - FG Huerta 41-yard field goal 7:29
BAL - FG Huerta 18-yard field goal 13:40

The winds at Taylor Field were particularly strong and gusted up to 85 km/h (50 mph) during the game. Indeed, they were so strong that CFL officials seriously considered postponing the game to the following night. They feared that the temporary stands built at one end at the stadium would not be safe.

The Stallions opened the game with a Grey Cup record 82-yard punt return by Chris Wright just 2:20 into the game. Calgary responded scoring the next 13 points, including a rare touchdown for Marvin Pope on a three-yard pass from Doug Flutie early in the second quarter giving the Stampeders a 13–7 lead.

Baltimore responded with four consecutive scores including three Carlos Huerta field goals against the wind, the longest from a Grey Cup record 53 yards. O. J. Brigance blocked a Tony Martino punt with just under eight minutes to go in the half which was scooped up by Alvin Walton at the five. He dived over for Baltimore's lone touchdown of the half. In the third quarter after a Baltimore single, Flutie scored a touchdown on a one-yard plunge but it was the last scoring for Calgary. Stallions quarterback Tracy Ham responded with a touchdown of his own and Huerta kicked two field goals to round out Baltimore's scoring.

== 1995 CFL Playoffs ==
=== North Division ===
- Semi-final (November 4 @ Calgary, Alberta) Calgary Stampeders 30-13 Hamilton Tiger-Cats
- Semi-final (November 5 @ Edmonton, Alberta) Edmonton Eskimos 26-15 BC Lions
- Final (November 12 @ Calgary, Alberta) Calgary Stampeders 37-4 Edmonton Eskimos

=== South Division ===
- Semi-final (November 4 @ Baltimore, Maryland) Baltimore Stallions 36-21 Winnipeg Blue Bombers
- Semi-final (November 5 @ San Antonio, Texas) San Antonio Texans 52-9 Birmingham Barracudas
- Final (November 12 @ Baltimore, Maryland) Baltimore Stallions 21-11 San Antonio Texans
