= 1994 Saskatchewan Roughriders season =

CFL team season

- General manager: Alan Ford
- Head coach: Don Matthews; Ray Jauch
- Home stadium: Taylor Field

Results
- Record: 11–7
- Division place: 4th, West
- Playoffs: Lost West Semi-Final
- Team MOP: Mike Saunders
- Team MOC: Ray Elgaard
- Team MOR: Chris Burns

Uniform

The 1994 Saskatchewan Roughriders finished in fourth place in the West Division with an 11–7 record and qualified for the playoffs, but lost the West Semi-Final game to the Calgary Stampeders.

== Offseason ==
=== CFL draft ===
| Round | Pick | Player | Position | School |
|---|---|---|---|---|
| 0 | 2 | Chris Burns | OT | Portland State |
| 1 | 10 | Matthiew Quiviger | OT | McGill |
| 2 | 18 | Andrew Greene | OL | Indiana |
| 4 | 33 | Andrew Walters | DB | British Columbia |
| 5 | 40 | Tony Tighe | OL | Edinboro |
| 6 | 47 | Paul Kozan | RB | Queen's |

== Preseason ==
| Game | Date | Opponent | Results | | Venue | Attendance |
| Game | Date | Opponent | Score | Record | Venue | Attendance |
|---|---|---|---|---|---|---|
| A | Wed, June 22 | at Edmonton Eskimos | L 22–38 | 0–1 | Commonwealth Stadium | 35,901 |
| B | Wed, June 29 | vs. Sacramento Gold Miners | W 19–4 | 1–1 | Taylor Field | 26,850 |

== Regular season ==
=== Season standings ===
West Division
| Pos | Team | Pld | W | L | T | PF | PA | PD | Pts | Div | Stk |
|---|---|---|---|---|---|---|---|---|---|---|---|
| 1 | Calgary Stampeders (Q) | 18 | 15 | 3 | 0 | 698 | 355 | 343 | 30 | 8–2 | W3 |
| 2 | Edmonton Eskimos (Q) | 18 | 13 | 5 | 0 | 518 | 401 | 117 | 26 | 7–3 | W2 |
| 3 | BC Lions (Q) | 18 | 11 | 6 | 1 | 604 | 456 | 148 | 23 | 5–4–1 | L1 |
| 4 | Saskatchewan Roughriders (Q) | 18 | 11 | 7 | 0 | 512 | 454 | 58 | 22 | 4–6 | W4 |
| 5 | Sacramento Gold Miners | 18 | 9 | 8 | 1 | 436 | 436 | 0 | 19 | 3–6–1 | W1 |
| 6 | Las Vegas Posse | 18 | 5 | 13 | 0 | 447 | 622 | −175 | 10 | 2–8 | L6 |

Source: "CFL.ca". Archived from the original on 2009-07-15.
(Q) Qualified for playoffs

=== Season schedule ===
| Week | Game | Date | Opponent | Results | | Venue | Attendance |
| Week | Game | Date | Opponent | Score | Record | Venue | Attendance |
|---|---|---|---|---|---|---|---|
| 1 | 1 | Fri, July 8 | vs. Calgary Stampeders | W 22–21 | 1–0 | Taylor Field | 23,342 |
| 2 | 2 | Sat, July 16 | at Las Vegas Posse | L 22–32 (OT) | 1–1 | Sam Boyd Stadium | 12,213 |
| 3 | 3 | Fri, July 22 | vs. Toronto Argonauts | W 35–24 | 2–1 | Taylor Field | 23,433 |
| 4 | 4 | Sat, July 30 | at Sacramento Gold Miners | L 27–30 | 2–2 | Hornet Stadium | 14,848 |
| 5 | 5 | Thurs, Aug 4 | at Edmonton Eskimos | L 23–42 | 2–3 | Commonwealth Stadium | 27,633 |
| 6 | 6 | Fri, Aug 12 | vs. Edmonton Eskimos | W 20–7 | 3–3 | Taylor Field | 24,548 |
| 7 | 7 | Fri, Aug 19 | at Calgary Stampeders | L 15–54 | 3–4 | McMahon Stadium | 29,044 |
| 8 | 8 | Fri, Aug 26 | at Ottawa Rough Riders | W 35–19 | 4–4 | Frank Clair Stadium | 21,738 |
| 9 | 9 | Sun, Sept 4 | vs. Winnipeg Blue Bombers | W 42–31 | 5–4 | Taylor Field | 28,738 |
| 10 | 10 | Sun, Sept 11 | at Winnipeg Blue Bombers | W 49–18 | 6–4 | Winnipeg Stadium | 29,618 |
| 11 | 11 | Sun, Sept 18 | vs. Baltimore CFLers | L 18–35 | 6–5 | Taylor Field | 28,035 |
| 12 | 12 | Sat, Sept 24 | at Shreveport Pirates | W 29–11 | 7–5 | Independence Stadium | 15,502 |
| 13 | 13 | Fri, Sept 30 | vs. Sacramento Gold Miners | L 16–19 | 7–6 | Taylor Field | 23,669 |
| 14 | 14 | Sat, Oct 8 | at BC Lions | L 22–23 | 7–7 | BC Place | 31,955 |
| 15 | 15 | Sat, Oct 15 | vs. BC Lions | W 38–27 | 8–7 | Taylor Field | 27,008 |
| 16 | 16 | Sun, Oct 23 | vs. Las Vegas Posse | W 37–18 | 9–7 | Taylor Field | 28,583 |
| 17 | 17 | Sat, Oct 29 | at Ottawa Rough Riders | W 46–29 | 10–7 | Frank Clair Stadium | 23,292 |
| 18 | 18 | Sun, Nov 6 | at Hamilton Tiger-Cats | W 16–14 | 11–7 | Ivor Wynne Stadium | 24,242 |

== Postseason ==
=== Schedule ===
| Game | Date | Opponent | Results | | Venue | Attendance |
| Game | Date | Opponent | Score | Record | Venue | Attendance |
|---|---|---|---|---|---|---|
| West Semi-Final | Sun, Nov 13 | at Calgary Stampeders | L 3–36 | 0–1 | McMahon Stadium | 25,633 |

== Roster ==
1994 Saskatchewan Roughriders final roster
| Quarterbacks: 12 Tom Burgess; 6 Warren Jones; 14 Michael Payton; Running backs: 8 Wolf Barber; 33 Mike Saunders; 35 Rick Walters; Receivers: 15 Bruce Boyko; 81 Ray Elgaard; 10 Dan Farthing; 87 Joey Jauch; 80 Don Narcisse; 5 Larry Thompson; 86 Elbert Turner | Offensive linemen: 66 Mike Anderson C; 51 Chris Burns T; 63 Scott Hendrickson G/C; 58 Michel Lamy T/G; 65 Quinn Magnuson G; 57 Dan Payne T; 61 Paul Vajda G; Defensive linemen: 96 Sean Brantley DT; 97 Brooks Findlay DE; 71 Bobby Jurasin DE; 79 Gary Lewis DT; 98 Lybrant Robinson DE | Linebackers: 95 Ray Bernard; 47 Ron Goetz; 74 Dan Rashovich; 41 Gary Rogers; Defensive backs: 4 Albert Brown; 24 Ventson Donelson; 7 Anthony Drawhorn; 21 Dale Joseph; 33 Aaron Ruffin; 30 Dallas Rysavy; 27 Glen Suitor; 2 Terryl Ulmer; 17 Dave Van Belleghem | Special teams: 13 Brent Matich P; 1 Paul McCallum K; Injured list: 64 Wayne Drinkwalter G/DT; 91 Peter Miller LB; 26 David Pitcher FB; 36 Dave Ridgway K; Italics indicate American player |
