= 1994 Baltimore CFLers season =

- Owner: Jim Speros
- General manager: Jim Popp
- Head coach: Don Matthews
- Home stadium: Memorial Stadium

Results
- Record: 12–6
- Division place: 2nd, East
- Playoffs: Lost Grey Cup
- Team MVP: Mike Pringle
- Team ROY: Matt Goodwin

Uniform
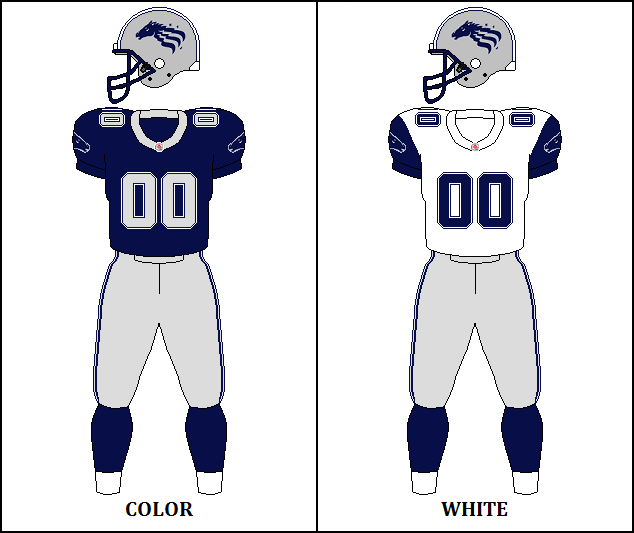

The 1994 Baltimore Football Club season was the first in the history of the Baltimore CFL franchise. Initially intended to be named the Baltimore CFL Colts, the team was forced to adopt a generic name after Robert Irsay successfully enjoined the team from using any name that might associate with the former Baltimore Colts, which he had controversially moved to Indiana 11 years prior. The team became the first American-based CFL team to play in the Grey Cup, but lost to the hometown BC Lions on a last second field goal.

== Preseason ==
Game	Date	Opponent	Results		Venue	Attendance
Game	Date	Opponent	Score	Record	Venue	Attendance
1	Fri, June 24	at Shreveport Pirates	W 33–18	1–0	Independence Stadium	19,000
2	Wed, June 29	vs. Winnipeg Blue Bombers	W 45–43	2–0	Memorial Stadium	21,078

=== Season standings ===
East Division
Pos	Team	Pld	W	L	T	PF	PA	PD	Pts	Div	Stk
1	Winnipeg Blue Bombers (Q)	18	13	5	0	651	572	79	26	9–1	W1
2	Baltimore CFLers (Q)	18	12	6	0	561	431	130	24	8-2	L1
3	Toronto Argonauts (Q)	18	7	11	0	504	578	−74	14	5–5	L2
4	Ottawa Rough Riders (Q)	18	4	14	0	480	647	−167	8	3–7	L7
5	Hamilton Tiger-Cats	18	4	14	0	435	562	−127	8	3–7	L3
6	Shreveport Pirates	18	3	15	0	330	661	−331	6	2–8	W2

Source: "CFL.ca". Archived from the original on July 15, 2009.
(Q) Qualified for playoffs

=== Season schedule ===
Week	Game	Date	Opponent	Results		Venue	Attendance
Week	Game	Date	Opponent	Score	Record	Venue	Attendance
1	1	Thurs, July 7	at Toronto Argonauts	W 28–20	1–0	SkyDome	13,101
2	2	Sat, July 16	vs. Calgary Stampeders	L 16–42	1–1	Memorial Stadium	39,247
3	3	Sat, July 23	vs. Shreveport Pirates	W 40–24	2–1	Memorial Stadium	31,172
4	4	Thurs, July 28	at Winnipeg Blue Bombers	L 32–39	2–2	Winnipeg Stadium	22,398
5	5	Sat, Aug 6	at Las Vegas Posse	W 38–33	3–2	Sam Boyd Stadium	10,122
6	6	Wed, Aug 10	vs. Hamilton Tiger-Cats	W 30–15	4–2	Memorial Stadium	37,231
7	7	Sat, Aug 20	vs. Toronto Argonauts	L 24–31	4–3	Memorial Stadium	41,155
8	8	Sat, Aug 27	at Hamilton Tiger-Cats	W 28–17	5–3	Ivor Wynne Stadium	15,227
9	9	Sat, Sept 3	at Shreveport Pirates	W 28–16	6–3	Independence Stadium	16,332
10	10	Sat, Sept 10	vs. Sacramento Gold Miners	L 29–30	6–4	Memorial Stadium	42,116
11	11	Sun, Sept 18	at Saskatchewan Roughriders	W 35–18	7–4	Taylor Field	28,035
12	12	Sun, Sept 25	at Ottawa Rough Riders	W 42–27	8–4	Frank Clair Stadium	20,764
13	13	Sat, Oct 1	vs. Ottawa Rough Riders	W 40–13	9–4	Memorial Stadium	36,187
14	14	Fri, Oct 7	vs. Las Vegas Posse	W 22–16	10–4	Memorial Stadium	34,186
15	15	Sun, Oct 16	at Edmonton Eskimos	L 24–31	10–5	Commonwealth Stadium	31,198
16	16	Sat, Oct 22	vs. BC Lions	W 48–31	11–5	Memorial Stadium	35,416
17	17	Sat, Oct 29	vs. Winnipeg Blue Bombers	W 57–10	12–5	Memorial Stadium	39,417
18	18	Sat, Nov 5	at Sacramento Gold Miners	L 0–18	12–6	Hornet Stadium	14,056

== Playoffs ==
Round	Date	Opponent	Results		Venue	Attendance
Round	Date	Opponent	Score	Record	Venue	Attendance
East Semi-Final	Sat, Nov 12	vs. Toronto Argonauts	W 34–15	1–0	Memorial Stadium	35,223
East Final	Sun, Nov 20	at Winnipeg Blue Bombers	W 14–12	2–0	Winnipeg Stadium	25,067
Grey Cup	Sun, Nov 27	vs. BC Lions	L 23–26	2–1	BC Place Stadium	55,097

== Awards and honors ==
After the season, other Baltimore Stallions' received awards and accomplishments in the CFL, which are:

1994 Eastern All-Stars

Offense

- Mike Pringle (RB)
- Peter Tuipulotu (FB)
- Chris Armstrong (SB)
- Nick Subis (C)
- Shar Pourdanesh (OT)

Defense

- Irvin Smith (CB)
- Michael Brooks (DS)

Special Teams

- Josh Miller (P)

1994 CFL All-Stars

Offense

- Mike Pringle (RB)
- Shar Pourdanesh (OT)

Defense

- Irvin Smith (CB)

Special Teams

- Josh Miller (P)

== Roster ==
1994 Baltimore CFLers final roster
Quarterbacks: 15 John Congemi; 8 Tracy Ham; 10 Shawn Jones; Running backs: 20 Sheldon Canley; 2 Robert Drummond; 27 Mike Pringle; 32 Peter Tuipulotu; Receivers: 5 Mike Alexander; 81 Chris Armstrong; 85 Shawn Beals; 86 Robert Clark; 16 Reggie Perry; 80 Joe Washington; 88 Byron Williams; 84 Walter Wilson	Offensive linemen: 62 Keith Ballard G/T; 60 Guy Earle G; 63 John Earle G; 66 Neal Fort T; 68 Shar Pourdanesh T; 51 Nick Subis C; Defensive linemen: 98 Jearld Baylis DT; 57 O. J. Brigance DE; 54 Grant Carter DE; 55 Malcolm Goodwin DE; 64 Scott Miller DT; 56 Elfrid Payton DE; 72 Robert Presbury DT	Linebackers: 38 Ken Benson; 54 Melendez Byrd; 50 Earnest Fields; 39 Matt Goodwin; 7 Tracy Gravely; 4 Alvin Walton; Defensive backs: 9 Charles Anthony; 3 Karl Anthony; 17 Michael Brooks; 6 Stan Petry; 21 Irvin Smith; 36 Les Smith; 33 Ken Watson; Special teams: 0 Donald Igwebuike K; 22 Josh Miller P; Italics indicate American player

== See also ==
- 2020 Washington Football Team season, a later season by a pro football team in the Baltimore-Washington Metroplex that used a generic team name
