= 1994 Edmonton Eskimos season =

Canadian football team season

- General manager: Hugh Campbell
- Head coach: Ron Lancaster
- Home stadium: Commonwealth Stadium

Results
- Record: 13–5
- Division place: 2nd, West
- Playoffs: Lost West Semi-Final

Uniform

The 1994 Edmonton Eskimos season was the 37th season for the team in the Canadian Football League (CFL) and their 46th overall. The Eskimos finished in second place in the West Division with a 13–5 record. However, they were upset in the 1994 West Semi-Final against the eventual Grey Cup Champion BC Lions.

== Offseason ==
=== CFL draft ===
Rd	Pick	Player	Position	School
1	13	Rob Wessling	T	Guelph
2	21	Pat McNerney	TE/OL	Weber State
3	29	Darryl Fridd	DL	Alberta
4	36	Brad Zacharias	TB	Acadia
5	43	Stephen Day	LB	Alberta

== Preseason ==
=== Schedule ===
Game	Date	Opponent	Results		Venue	Attendance
Game	Date	Opponent	Score	Record	Venue	Attendance
A	Wed, June 22	vs Saskatchewan Roughriders	W 38–22	1–0	Commonwealth Stadium	35,901
B	Wed, June 29	at Las Vegas Posse	L 11–22	1–1	Sam Boyd Stadium	6,280

== Regular season ==
=== Season standings ===
West Division
Pos	Team	Pld	W	L	T	PF	PA	PD	Pts	Div	Stk
1	Calgary Stampeders (Q)	18	15	3	0	698	355	343	30	8–2	W3
2	Edmonton Eskimos (Q)	18	13	5	0	518	401	117	26	7–3	W2
3	BC Lions (Q)	18	11	6	1	604	456	148	23	5–4–1	L1
4	Saskatchewan Roughriders (Q)	18	11	7	0	512	454	58	22	4–6	W4
5	Sacramento Gold Miners	18	9	8	1	436	436	0	19	3–6–1	W1
6	Las Vegas Posse	18	5	13	0	447	622	−175	10	2–8	L6

Source: "CFL.ca". Archived from the original on 2009-07-15.
(Q) Qualified for playoffs

=== Season schedule ===
Week	Game	Date	Opponent	Results		Venue	Attendance
Week	Game	Date	Opponent	Score	Record	Venue	Attendance
1	1	Sat, July 9	vs. Hamilton Tiger-Cats	W 26–11	1–0	Commonwealth Stadium	25,687
2	2	Thu, July 13	at Winnipeg Blue Bombers	L 35–50	1–1	Winnipeg Stadium	21,686
3	3	Wed, July 20	vs. Ottawa Rough Riders	W 23–21	2–1	Commonwealth Stadium	27,188
4	4	Sat, July 30	at Shreveport Pirates	W 24–10	3–1	Independence Stadium	17,434
5	5	Thu, Aug 4	vs. Saskatchewan Roughriders	W 42–23	4–1	Commonwealth Stadium	27,633
6	6	Fri, Aug 12	at Saskatchewan Roughriders	L 7–20	4–2	Taylor Field	24,548
7	7	Thu, Aug 18	at Sacramento Gold Miners	W 44–15	5–2	Hornet Stadium	13,959
8	8	Thu, Aug 25	vs. Las Vegas Posse	W 44–17	6–2	Commonwealth Stadium	28,559
9	9	Mon, Sept 5	at Calgary Stampeders	L 15–48	6–3	McMahon Stadium	37,317
10	10	Fri, Sept 9	vs. Calgary Stampeders	W 38–12	7–3	Commonwealth Stadium	51,180
11	11	Sat, Sept 17	at BC Lions	W 25–16	8–3	BC Place	34,929
12	12	Sun, Sept 25	vs. Toronto Argonauts	W 28–25	9–3	Commonwealth Stadium	24,132
13	13	Fri, Sept 30	vs. BC Lions	L 24–26	9–4	Commonwealth Stadium	23,187
14	14	Sun, Oct 9	at Hamilton Tiger-Cats	W 33–32	10–4	Ivor Wynne Stadium	14,402
15	15	Sun, Oct 16	vs. Baltimore CFLers	W 31–24	11–4	Commonwealth Stadium	31,918
16	16	Sun, Oct 23	at Toronto Argonauts	L 6–23	11–5	SkyDome	22,210
17	17	Sat, Oct 29	vs. Sacramento Gold Miners	W 22–16	12–5	Commonwealth Stadium	29,322
18	18	Sat, Nov 5	vs. Las Vegas Posse	W 51–10	13–5	Commonwealth Stadium	14,228

Total attendance: 268806

Average attendance: 29867

== Awards and records ==
=== Defence ===
- DT – Bennie Goods, Edmonton Eskimos
- LB – Willie Pless, Edmonton Eskimos
- DB – Robert Holland, Edmonton Eskimos

=== Special teams ===
- ST – Henry "Gizmo" Williams, Edmonton Eskimos

=== Offence ===
- OT – Blake Dermott, Edmonton Eskimos

=== Defence ===
- DT – Bennie Goods, Edmonton Eskimos
- LB – Willie Pless, Edmonton Eskimos
- DB – Robert Holland, Edmonton Eskimos

=== Special teams ===
- ST – Henry "Gizmo" Williams, Edmonton Eskimos

== Playoffs ==
=== West Semi-final ===
Team	1st	2nd	3rd	4th	Final
BC Lions	7	13	0	4	24
Edmonton Eskimos	5	7	3	8	23

== Roster ==
1994 Edmonton Eskimos final roster
Quarterbacks: 9 Damon Allen; 14 Rickey Foggie; 16 Chris Vargas; Running backs: 33 Lucius Floyd; 32 Michael Soles; 34 Brian Walling; Receivers: 4 Eddie Brown; 87 Jay Christensen; 8 Mike Lee; 31 Marc Tobert; 2 Gizmo Williams	Offensive linemen: 67 Rod Connop C; 50 Blake Dermott T; 53 Mike Dumaresq G; 59 Leo Groenewegen G; 58 Craig Hendrickson T; 63 Bill Henry G; 60 Chris Morris T; Defensive linemen: 90 David Bailey DT; 89 Leroy Blugh DE; 40 Bennie Goods DT; 46 Malvin Hunter DE; 43 Jed Roberts DE; 91 Tony Woods DT	Linebackers: 36 Bruce Dickson; 45 Todd Herget; 38 Errol Martin; 39 Willie Pless; 47 Larry Wruck; Defensive backs: 28 Trent Brown; 17 John Holland; 25 Morris Lolar; 24 Danny Murphy; 26 Glenn Rogers; 20 Don Wilson	Special teams: 3 Sean Fleming K; 18 Glenn Harper P; Injured list: 13 Ed Berry DB; 35 Eric Blount RB; 98 Oscar Giles DT; 29 Brandon Hamilton DB; 23 J. P. Izquierdo SB; 19 John Kalin DB; 7 Jim Sandusky WR; Italics indicate International player
