= 1994 Calgary Stampeders season =

Canadian football team season

- Owner: Larry Ryckman
- General manager: Wally Buono
- Head coach: Wally Buono
- Home stadium: McMahon Stadium

Results
- Record: 15–3
- Division place: 1st, West
- Playoffs: Lost West Final

Uniform

The 1994 Calgary Stampeders finished in first place in the West Division with a 15–3 record. They appeared in the West Final but lost to the eventual Grey Cup champions BC Lions.

== Preseason ==
Game	Date	Opponent	Results		Venue	Attendance
Game	Date	Opponent	Score	Record	Venue	Attendance
A	June 18	at Sacramento Gold Miners	W 38–24	1–0	Hornet Stadium	19,101
B	June 28	vs. BC Lions	L 24–37	1–1	McMahon Stadium	20,078

== Regular season ==
=== Season standings ===
West Division
Pos	Team	Pld	W	L	T	PF	PA	PD	Pts	Div	Stk
1	Calgary Stampeders (Q)	18	15	3	0	698	355	343	30	8–2	W3
2	Edmonton Eskimos (Q)	18	13	5	0	518	401	117	26	7–3	W2
3	BC Lions (Q)	18	11	6	1	604	456	148	23	5–4–1	L1
4	Saskatchewan Roughriders (Q)	18	11	7	0	512	454	58	22	4–6	W4
5	Sacramento Gold Miners	18	9	8	1	436	436	0	19	3–6–1	W1
6	Las Vegas Posse	18	5	13	0	447	622	−175	10	2–8	L6

Source: "CFL.ca". Archived from the original on 2009-07-15.
(Q) Qualified for playoffs

=== Season schedule ===
Week	Game	Date	Opponent	Results		Venue	Attendance
Week	Game	Date	Opponent	Score	Record	Venue	Attendance
1	1	Fri, July 8	at Saskatchewan Roughriders	L 21–22	0–1	Taylor Field	23,342
2	2	Sat, July 16	at Baltimore CFLers	W 42–16	1–1	Memorial Stadium	39,247
3	3	Sat, July 23	vs. Winnipeg Blue Bombers	W 58–19	2–1	McMahon Stadium	26,243
4	4	Fri, July 29	vs. BC Lions	W 62–21	3–1	McMahon Stadium	23,963
5	5	Wed, Aug 3	at Ottawa Rough Riders	W 30–27	4–1	Frank Clair Stadium	17,163
6	6	Wed, Aug 10	vs. Sacramento Gold Miners	W 25–11	5–1	McMahon Stadium	21,110
7	7	Fri, Aug 19	vs. Saskatchewan Roughriders	W 54–15	6–1	McMahon Stadium	29,044
8	8	Thu, Aug 25	at Toronto Argonauts	W 52–3	7–1	SkyDome	19,158
9	9	Mon, Sept 5	vs. Edmonton Eskimos	W 48–15	8–1	McMahon Stadium	37,317
10	10	Fri, Sept 9	at Edmonton Eskimos	L 12–38	8–2	Commonwealth Stadium	51,180
11	11	Fri, Sept 16	vs. Las Vegas Posse	W 35–25	9–2	McMahon Stadium	24,852
12	12	Sat, Sept 24	at Sacramento Gold Miners	W 39–25	10–2	Hornet Stadium	17,192
13	13	Sun, Oct 2	at Las Vegas Posse	W 45–26	11–2	Sam Boyd Stadium	7,438
14	14	Mon, Oct 10	vs. Ottawa Rough Riders	W 28–24	12–2	McMahon Stadium	22,615
15	15	Sun, Oct 16	at Hamilton Tiger-Cats	L 24–27	12–3	Ivor Wynne Stadium	19,516
16	16	Fri, Oct 21	vs. Shreveport Pirates	W 52–8	13–3	McMahon Stadium	21,317
17	17	Sun, Oct 30	vs. Hamilton Tiger-Cats	W 47–10	14–3	McMahon Stadium	20,029
18	18	Sat, Nov 5	at BC Lions	W 24–23	15–3	BC Place	40,556

== Awards and records ==
- Jeff Nicklin Memorial Trophy – Doug Flutie (QB)

== Playoffs ==
=== West Semi-Final ===
Team	Q1	Q2	Q3	Q4	Total
Saskatchewan Roughriders	3	0	0	0	3
Calgary Stampeders	2	10	14	10	36

=== West Final ===
Team	Q1	Q2	Q3	Q4	Total
BC Lions	4	17	7	9	37
Calgary Stampeders	7	17	10	2	36

== Roster ==
1994 Calgary Stampeders final roster
Quarterbacks: 20 Doug Flutie; 7 Jeff Garcia; 9 Steve Taylor; Running backs: 35 Shawn Daniels; 26 Tony Stewart; 36 Blair Zerr; Receivers: 88 Vince Danielsen; 82 Will Moore; 18 Allen Pitts; 86 Demetrius Smith; 80 Brian Wiggins	Offensive linemen: 60 Bruce Covernton T; 67 Jamie Crysdale G/C; 56 Doug Davies C; 64 Ken Moore T; 62 Bobby Pandelidis G; 59 Rocco Romano T/G; Defensive linemen: 81 Will Johnson DE; 75 Stu Laird DT; 99 Kenny Walker DE; 98 Lubo Zizakovic DT; 96 Srecko Zizakovic DE/DT	Linebackers: 44 Ray Biggs; 37 Matt Finlay; 51 Alondra Johnson; 91 Marvin Pope; 31 Roger Reinson; Defensive backs: 17 Marvin Coleman; 3 Doug Craft; 6 Greg Frers; 8 Greg Knox; 30 Kenton Leonard; 2 Junior Thurman; 38 Gerald Vaughn; 33 Ken Watson	Special teams: 11 Tony Martino P/K; 13 Mark McLoughlin K; Reserve roster: 28 Duane Dmytryshyn SB; 95 Mark Pearce DT; Injured list: 25 Dave Sapunjis WR; 32 Damon Smith DB; Italics indicate International player
