= 1994 BC Lions season =

Canadian football team season

- Owner: Bill Comrie
- General manager: Eric Tillman
- Head coach: Dave Ritchie
- Home stadium: BC Place Stadium

Results
- Record: 11–6–1
- Division place: 3rd, West
- Playoffs: Won Grey Cup

Uniform

The 1994 BC Lions finished in third place in the West Division with an 11–6–1 record. They won all of their playoff games and won the 82nd Grey Cup at home in Vancouver, British Columbia.

== Offseason ==
=== CFL draft ===
Round	Pick	Player	Position	School
1	6	Trevor Shaw	Wide receiver	Weber State
1	9	Stefan Ptaszek	Wide receiver	Wilfrid Laurier
2	17	Mike Morreale	Wide receiver	McMaster
3	25	Mike Bromilow	Defensive tackle	Simon Fraser
5	39	Paul Blackwood	Running back	Cincinnati
6	46	Paul Zuccato	Linebacker	Simon Fraser

== Preseason ==
Game	Date	Opponent	Results		Venue	Attendance
Game	Date	Opponent	Score	Record	Venue	Attendance
A	Mon, June 20	vs. Las Vegas Posse	L 12–47	0–1	BC Place	
B	Tue, June 28	at Calgary Stampeders	W 37–24	1–1	McMahon Stadium	20,078

== Regular season ==
=== Season standings ===
West Division
Pos	Team	Pld	W	L	T	PF	PA	PD	Pts	Div	Stk
1	Calgary Stampeders (Q)	18	15	3	0	698	355	343	30	8–2	W3
2	Edmonton Eskimos (Q)	18	13	5	0	518	401	117	26	7–3	W2
3	BC Lions (Q)	18	11	6	1	604	456	148	23	5–4–1	L1
4	Saskatchewan Roughriders (Q)	18	11	7	0	512	454	58	22	4–6	W4
5	Sacramento Gold Miners	18	9	8	1	436	436	0	19	3–6–1	W1
6	Las Vegas Posse	18	5	13	0	447	622	−175	10	2–8	L6

(Q) Qualified for playoffs

=== Season schedule ===
Week	Game	Date	Opponent	Results		Venue	Attendance
Week	Game	Date	Opponent	Score	Record	Venue	Attendance
1	1	Fri, July 8	vs. Winnipeg Blue Bombers	W 24–20	1–0	BC Place	20,069
2	2	Fri, July 15	at Ottawa Rough Riders	W 57–18	2–0	Frank Clair Stadium	20,069
3	3	Thu, July 21	vs. Hamilton Tiger-Cats	W 42–25	3–0	BC Place	18,976
4	4	Fri, July 29	at Calgary Stampeders	L 21–62	3–1	McMahon Stadium	23,963
5	5	Thu, Aug 4	vs. Sacramento Gold Miners	W 46–10	4–1	BC Place	18,459
6	6	Thu, Aug 11	vs. Toronto Argonauts	W 54–39	5–1	BC Place	19,424
7	7	Sat, Aug 20	at Las Vegas Posse	W 39–16	6–1	Sam Boyd Stadium	14,432
8	8	Sat, Aug 27	vs. Shreveport Pirates	W 67–15	7–1	BC Place	20,398
9	9	Fri, Sept 2	at Sacramento Gold Miners	T 15–15	7–1–1	Hornet Stadium	12,633
10	10	Sun, Sept 11	at Toronto Argonauts	W 28–18	8–1–1	SkyDome	15,259
11	11	Sat, Sept 17	vs. Edmonton Eskimos	L 18–25	8–2–1	BC Place	34,929
12	12	Fri, Sept 23	at Winnipeg Blue Bombers	L 18–30	8–3–1	Winnipeg Stadium	30,134
13	13	Fri, Sept 30	at Edmonton Eskimos	W 26–24	9–3–1	Commonwealth Stadium	23,189
14	14	Sat, Oct 8	vs. Saskatchewan Roughriders	W 23–22	10–3–1	BC Place	31,955
15	15	Sat, Oct 15	at Saskatchewan Roughriders	L 27–39	10–4–1	Taylor Field	27,008
16	16	Sat, Oct 22	at Baltimore CFLers	L 31–48	10–5–1	Memorial Stadium	35,416
17	17	Sat, Oct 29	vs. Las Vegas Posse	W 45–7	11–5–1	BC Place	22,701
18	18	Sat, Nov 5	vs. Calgary Stampeders	L 23–24	11–6–1	BC Place	40,556

== Awards and records ==
=== 1994 CFL All-Stars ===
- FB – Sean Millington, CFL All-Star
- CB – Less Browne, CFL All-Star
- DB – Charles Gordon, CFL All-Star

=== Western Division All-Star selections ===
- FB – Sean Millington, CFL Western All-Star
- SB – Darren Flutie, CFL Western All-Star
- WR – Ray Alexander, CFL Western All-Star
- OG – Rob Smith, CFL Western All-Star
- CB – Less Browne, CFL Western All-Star
- DB – Charles Gordon, CFL Western All-Star

== Playoffs ==
=== West Semi-Final ===
Team	Q1	Q2	Q3	Q4	Total
Edmonton Eskimos	5	7	3	8	23
BC Lions	7	13	0	4	24

=== West Final ===
Team	Q1	Q2	Q3	Q4	Total
BC Lions	4	17	7	9	37
Calgary Stampeders	7	17	10	2	36

=== Grey Cup ===
Team	Q1	Q2	Q3	Q4	Total
BC Lions	3	7	10	6	26
Baltimore CFLers	0	17	3	3	23

== Roster ==
1994 BC Lions final roster
Quarterbacks: 7 Kent Austin; 10 Trent Green; 14 Danny McManus; Running backs: 34 Ryan Hanson; 25 Sean Millington; 6 Cory Philpot; Receivers: 88 Ray Alexander; 85 Matt Clark; 82 Darren Flutie; 16 Spencer McLennan; 89 Yo Murphy; 77 Mike Trevathan	Offensive linemen: 53 Denny Chronopoulos G; 59 Todd Furdyk T; 68 Cory Mantyka G/T; 55 Ian Sinclair C; 58 Rob Smith T/G; 63 Vic Stevenson T; 60 Jamie Taras G/C; Defensive linemen: 74 Dave Chaytors DT; 92 Doug Petersen DE; 96 Virgil Robertson DE; 73 Andrew Stewart DT; Special teams: 2 Giulio Caravatta P/QB; 5 Lui Passaglia K/P	Linebackers: 47 Tyrone Chatman; 39 Matt Clarke; 48 Brian Forde; 94 Henry Newby; 91 Angelo Snipes; 45 Ricardo Washington; 27 Donovan Wright; Defensive backs: 0 Less Browne; 23 Tony Collier; 13 Tom Europe; 22 Sean Foudy; 26 Charles Gordon; 20 James Jefferson; 3 Barry Wilburn	Injured list: 26 Michael Allen DB; 24 Mervyn Fernandez WR; 90 Doug Hocking LB; 29 Enis Jackson DB; 21 Tony Jackson RB; 72 Glen Scrivener DT; 3 Kelly Sims DB; Italics indicate International player
