= Humphreys Academy =

Segregation academy in Mississippi

Location
- 800 Pluck Road; Belzoni, Mississippi; United States; 33°11′7″N 90°29′5″W

Information
- Type: Private School (Non-Sectarian)
- Established: 1968
- Headmaster: Joe Taylor
- Grades: K - 12
- Enrollment: 120 (2016)
- Colors: Red and White
- Nickname: Rebels
- Affiliation: Mississippi Association of Independent Schools
- Website: https://www.harebels.org
- Last updated: 5 January 2018

Humphreys Academy is a private, nonsectarian, school in Belzoni, Mississippi (United States).

Located at 800 Pluck Road in Belzoni, the school serves students in grades K-12.

== History ==
Humphreys Academy was established in 1968 as a segregation academy and is a member of the Mississippi Association of Independent Schools. In 1969, $160,000 was raised in three weeks to purchase a facility in Silver City. In 1970, an additional $180,000 was raised to build a metal building in Belzoni which included 16 classrooms. In 1970, the IRS revoked Humphreys Academy's tax exempt status because of its racially discriminatory admissions policies.

As of 2016, the school's students were 99% white, while Humphreys County was 75% black.

The school athletic teams are nicknamed the Rebels.

== See also ==
- List of private schools in Mississippi
- Humphreys County School District and Humphreys County High School
