= Ben Williams (American football, born 1970) =

American football player (born 1970)

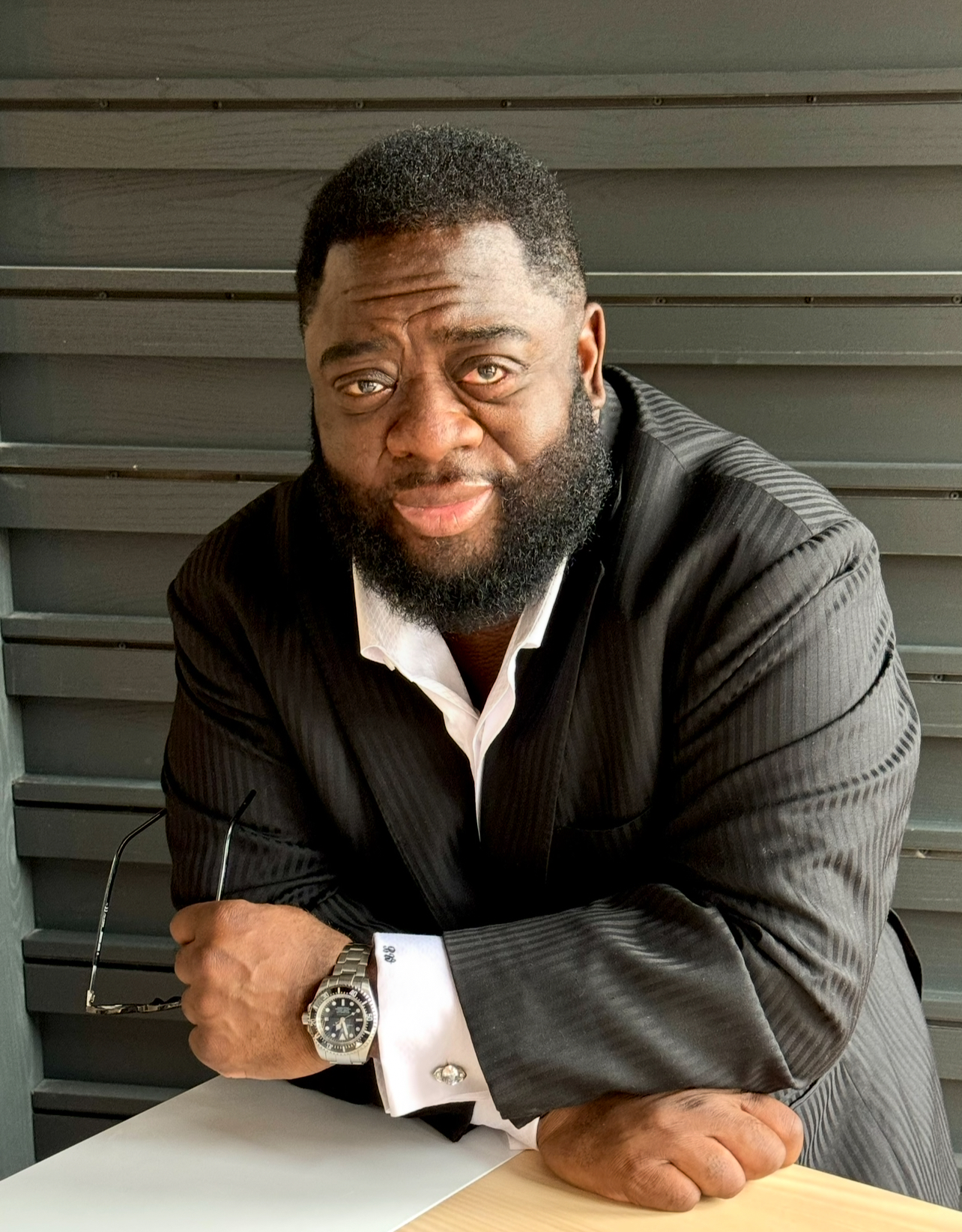
- Williams in 2018

No. 98, 90
- Position: Defensive end/defensive tackle

Personal information
- Born: May 28, 1970 (age 56); Belzoni, Mississippi, U.S.
- Listed height: 6 ft 2 in (1.88 m)
- Listed weight: 275 lb (125 kg)

Career information
- High school: Humphreys County (Belzoni, Mississippi)
- College: Minnesota
- NFL draft: 1992: undrafted

Career history
- Saskatchewan Roughriders (1993)*; Shreveport Pirates (1994–1995); Florida Bobcats (1996); Tampa Bay Buccaneers (1996)*; Arizona Cardinals (1997)*; London/England Monarchs (1997–1998); Minnesota Vikings (1998); Philadelphia Eagles (1999); Edmonton Eskimos (2000); Chicago Bears (2000)*; Dallas Cowboys (2001)*; Baltimore Ravens (2002)*
- * Offseason or practice squad member only

Awards and highlights
- Second-team All-Big Ten (1991); CFL East Division All-Star (1994)

Career CFL statistics
- Tackles: 114
- Tackles for loss: 8
- Sacks: 17
- Stats at CFL.ca (archived)
- Stats at Pro Football Reference

Lewis Ben Williams (born May 28, 1970) is an American former professional football player. Born in Belzoni, Mississippi, Williams played as a defensive lineman at the University of Minnesota. He led the team in sacks for the 1990 and 1991 seasons, and was named as honorable mention to the Associated Press's 1990 All-Big Ten Conference football team and a second-teamer on the 1991 All-Big Ten Conference football team; he held the all-time sack record for the Golden Gophers upon graduation.

After college, Williams played in the Canadian Football League (CFL) for the Shreveport Pirates, where he was named an East Division All-Star in 1994. Over two seasons in 1994 and 1995, he recorded 15 sacks and 107 tackles. In the 1997 World League draft, he was selected second overall with the first pick of by the London Monarchs. He played for the Monarchs in 1997 and 1998, recording 73 tackles and nine sacks. Williams made his NFL debut for the Minnesota Vikings in 1998, playing in one game; he spent most of the season as a backup to John Randle, Tony Williams, Stalin Colinet, and Fernando Smith. The following year, he played in three games for the Philadelphia Eagles before returning to the CFL, playing six games for the Edmonton Eskimos in 2000. Since his retirement, Williams has become the president of the National Football League Players Association (NFLPA) in Minnesota as well as an active advocate for organ donation.

== Early life and college ==
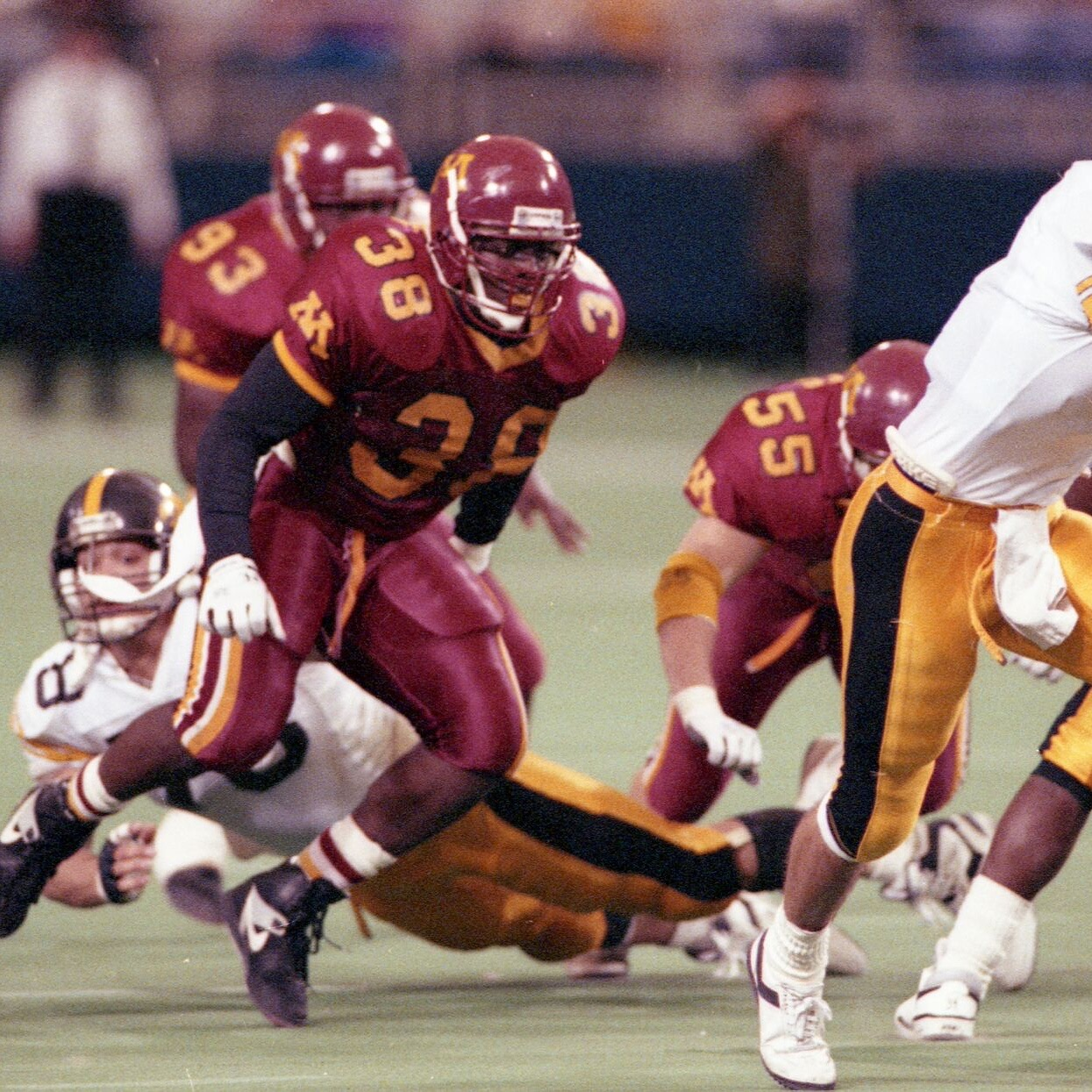
Williams played for the Minnesota Golden Gophers in college and retired as their career sacks leader.

Ben Williams was born on May 28, 1970 in Belzoni, Mississippi, a small town known as the "catfish capital of the world". He played football at Humphreys County High School, where he was named player of the year.

In 1988, Williams committed to the Minnesota Golden Gophers. In his junior 1990 season, Williams led the team with six sacks and seven tackles for loss. He was an honorable mention to the Associated Press's 1990 All-Big Ten Conference football team. In his senior 1991 season, he was named as a second-teamer on the 1991 All-Big Ten Conference football team; he recorded 97 tackles and again led the team with six sacks. Williams finished his career at Minnesota with 183 total tackles and 13 sacks, making him the school's all-time sacks leader at the time.

== Professional career ==
After the end of his collegiate career, Williams spent two years out of football. He signed with the Saskatchewan Roughriders of the Canadian Football League (CFL) ahead of the 1993 season, but never made it off the practice squad due to a broken leg. In 1994, he signed with the CFL's Shreveport Pirates, where he spent two years. In the 1994 season, Williams played in 16 games, recording 46 tackles and seven sacks. He was named to the East Division All-Star team, and was nominated for the CFL's Defensive Player of the Year award. Williams was one of only two Pirates selected for the All-Star team. The Canadian Press said he was "one of the CFL's top defensive linemen" and the "lone shining light on an abysmal defense". The following year, Williams recorded 61 tackles and 8 sacks with the Pirates over 18 games; the franchise folded following the season.

Following his time in the CFL, Williams was signed by the Tampa Bay Buccaneers in 1996 and the Arizona Cardinals in 1997. However, he was waived from both teams. The London Monarchs of the World League selected Williams with their first pick, and the second pick overall, in the 1997 draft. Williams spent two years with the team in the league, a minor league intended to develop players. Over his two years with the Monarchs, Williams recorded 73 tackles and 9 sacks.

Williams was signed by the Minnesota Vikings ahead of the 1998 season. Williams entered training camp playing behind John Randle and Tony Williams at defensive tackle, but shifted to defensive end in the season, where he backed up Stalin Colinet and Fernando Smith. Williams was promoted from the practice squad to the active roster on December 8. He played in one game in the season, recording two quarterback pressures. The following year, Williams signed with the Philadelphia Eagles, where he played as a defensive tackle. In three games, he recorded two tackles and a forced fumble.

In the 2000 season, Williams returned to the CFL, playing for the Edmonton Eskimos. He came back to the league to reunite with Don Matthews, who had been his coach during his time with the Saskatchewan Roughriders. He played in six games for the Eskimos, recording seven tackles and two sacks. Williams would later have short stints with the Chicago Bears and the Dallas Cowboys in the 2000 and 2001 seasons, and the Baltimore Ravens in the 2002 season.

== Personal life ==
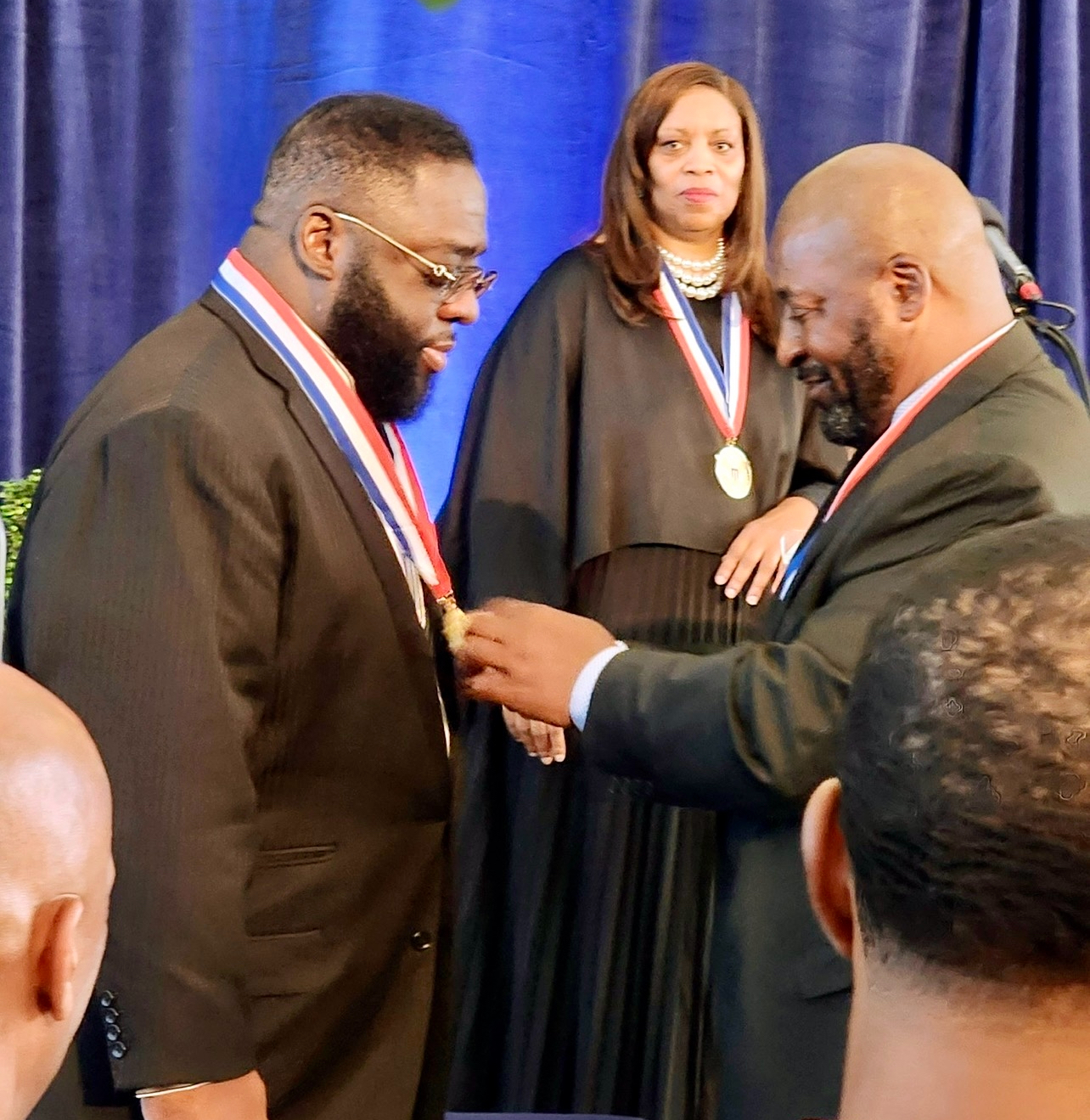
Ben Williams being presented the President’s Lifetime Achievement Award.

Williams is an advocate for kidney disease patients and for organ donation; in 2019, he underwent a kidney transplant after being on a waiting list for six years. Through the philanthropic support of the Ben Williams Foundation, he helped fund eight mobile kidney dialysis units throughout the Mississippi Delta, including his hometown of Belzoni, Mississippi. Since his transplant, Williams received an MBA from the Kelley School of Business at the Indiana University Bloomington, and is pursuing a Juris Doctor degree at Columbia Law School. Williams is the president of the National Football League Players Association (NFLPA) - Minnesota Chapter. Williams was awarded with the President’s Lifetime Achievement Award by Joe Biden.

Williams was made an NFL game day compliance and regulations official for the Minnesota Vikings ahead of the 2022 season; the job of the official is to identify and document violations of NFL uniform and equipment standards, as well as to enforce corrective actions.

== Career statistics ==
=== CFL ===
Year	Team						
Year	Team	GP	Tackles	TFL	Sacks	FF	FF
1994	Shreveport Pirates	16	46	2	7	0	1
1995	Shreveport Pirates	18	61	6	8	0	2
2000	Edmonton Eskimos	6	7	0	2	0	0
Career		34	114	8	17	0	3

=== NFL Europe ===
Year	Team				
Year	Team	Tackles	Sacks	FF	FR
1997	London Monarchs	42	3.5	0	0
1998	England Monarchs	31	5.5	1	0
Career		73	9	1	0

=== NFL ===
Year	Team				
Year	Team	GP	Tackles	Sacks	FF
1998	Minnesota Vikings	1	0	0	0
1999	Philadelphia Eagles	3	2	0	1
Career		4	2	0	1
