= Shawn Beals =

American football player (born 1966)

No. 81, 88, 85
- Positions: Wide receiver, return specialist

Personal information
- Born: August 16, 1966 (age 60); Walnut Creek, California, U.S.
- Listed height: 5 ft 10 in (1.78 m)
- Listed weight: 178 lb (81 kg)

Career information
- High school: Pittsburg (Pittsburg, California)
- College: Idaho State
- NFL draft: 1988: undrafted

Career history
- Miami Dolphins (1988)*; Philadelphia Eagles (1988); Washington Redskins (1989)*; Calgary Stampeders (1990–1992); Sacramento Gold Miners (1993); Baltimore CFLers (1994)
- * Offseason or practice squad member only

Career NFL statistics
- Return yards: 625
- Fumble recoveries: 1
- Stats at Pro Football Reference

Shawn E. Beals (born August 16, 1966) is an American former professional football player who was a wide receiver in the National Football League (NFL) and Canadian Football League (CFL). He played college football for the Idaho State Bengals from 1985 to 1987 and professional football for the Philadelphia Eagles (1988), Calgary Stampeders (1990-1992), Sacramento Gold Miners (1993), and Baltimore CFLers (1994).

== Early life ==
Beals was born in 1966 in Walnut Creek, California. He attended Pittsburgh High School in Pittsburg, California. He was a wide receiver for Pittsburg. Beals next attended Idaho State University where he played at the wide receiver position from 1985 to 1987. As a senior, he caught 62 passes for 1,022 yards.

== Professional football ==
Beals was not selected in the 1988 NFL draft. He began his professional football career as a free agent with the Miami Dolphins during the 1988 pre-season. He was released by the Dolphins prior to the start of the regular season and was picked up by the Philadelphia Eagles. He appeared in 13 games for the Eagles during the 1988 season, tallying 625 yards on kickoff returns. He spent the 1989 season on the Washington Redskins' practice squad. He then moved to the CFL, spending three seasons with the Calgary Stampeders from 1990 to 1992 and one season each with the Sacramento Gold Miners in 1993 and the Baltimore CFLers in 1994. He appeared in 49 games in the CFL with 136 receptions for 2,071 yards and nine touchdowns.
