= 1994 Sacramento Gold Miners season =

- Owner: Fred Anderson
- General manager: Tom Huiskens
- Head coach: Kay Stephenson
- Home stadium: Hornet Stadium

Results
- Record: 9–8–1
- Division place: 5th, West
- Playoffs: Did not qualify

Uniform
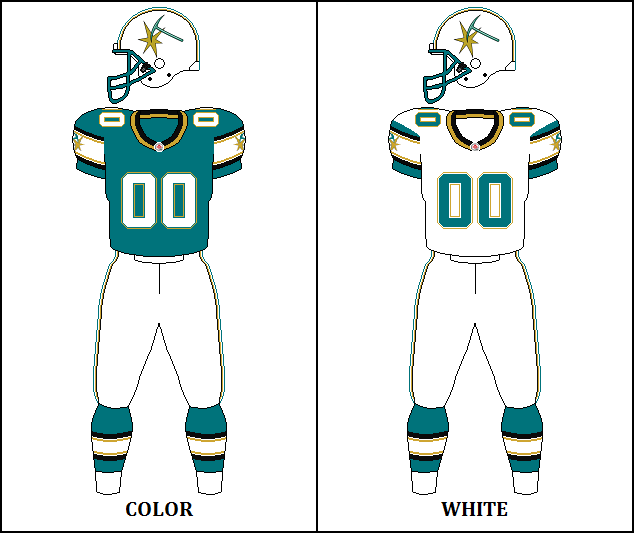

The 1994 Sacramento Gold Miners season was the second for the team in the Canadian Football League (CFL). The team finished in fifth place in the West Division with a 9–8–1 record and failed to make the playoffs.

== Preseason ==
| Game | Date | Opponent | Results | | Venue | Attendance |
| Game | Date | Opponent | Score | Record | Venue | Attendance |
|---|---|---|---|---|---|---|
| A | Sat, June 18 | vs. Calgary Stampeders | L 24–39 | 0–1 | Hornet Stadium | 13,650 |
| B | Wed, June 29 | at Saskatchewan Roughriders | L 4–19 | 0–2 | Taylor Field | 26,850 |

== Regular season ==
=== Standings ===
West Division
| Team | GP | W | L | T | Pts | PF | PA | Div | Stk | |
|---|---|---|---|---|---|---|---|---|---|---|
| Calgary Stampeders | 18 | 15 | 3 | 0 | 30 | 698 | 355 | 8–2 | W3 | Details |
| Edmonton Eskimos | 18 | 13 | 5 | 0 | 26 | 518 | 401 | 7–3 | W2 | Details |
| BC Lions | 18 | 11 | 6 | 1 | 23 | 604 | 456 | 5–4–1 | L1 | Details |
| Saskatchewan Roughriders | 18 | 11 | 7 | 0 | 22 | 512 | 454 | 4–6 | W4 | Details |
| Sacramento Gold Miners | 18 | 9 | 8 | 1 | 19 | 436 | 436 | 3–6–1 | W1 | Details |
| Las Vegas Posse | 18 | 5 | 13 | 0 | 10 | 447 | 622 | 2–8 | L6 | Details |

=== Regular season ===
| Week | Game | Date | Opponent | Results | | Venue | Attendance |
| Week | Game | Date | Opponent | Score | Record | Venue | Attendance |
|---|---|---|---|---|---|---|---|
| 1 | 1 | Fri, July 8 | vs. Las Vegas Posse | L 26–32 | 0–1 | Hornet Stadium | 14,816 |
| 2 | 2 | Thu, July 14 | at Hamilton Tiger-Cats | W 25–22 | 1–1 | Ivor Wynne Stadium | 19,291 |
| 3 | 3 | Sat, July 23 | at Las Vegas Posse | W 22–20 | 2–1 | Sam Boyd Stadium | 10,740 |
| 4 | 4 | Sat, July 30 | vs. Saskatchewan Roughriders | W 30–27 | 3–1 | Hornet Stadium | 14,828 |
| 5 | 5 | Thu, Aug 4 | vs. BC Lions | L 10–46 | 3–2 | Hornet Stadium | 18,459 |
| 6 | 6 | Wed, Aug 10 | at Calgary Stampeders | L 11–25 | 3–3 | McMahon Stadium | 21,110 |
| 7 | 7 | Thu, Aug 18 | vs. Edmonton Eskimos | L 15–44 | 3–4 | Hornet Stadium | 13,959 |
| 8 | 8 | Wed, Aug 24 | at Winnipeg Blue Bombers | L 28–31 | 3–5 | Winnipeg Stadium | 21,804 |
| 9 | 9 | Fri, Sept 2 | vs. BC Lions | T 15–15 | 3–5–1 | Hornet Stadium | 12,633 |
| 10 | 10 | Sat, Sept 10 | at Baltimore CFLers | W 30–29 | 4–5–1 | Memorial Stadium | 42,116 |
| 11 | 11 | Sat, Sept 17 | vs. Shreveport Pirates | W 56–3 | 5–5–1 | Hornet Stadium | 13,741 |
| 12 | 12 | Sat, Sept 24 | vs. Calgary Stampeders | L 25–39 | 5–6–1 | Hornet Stadium | 17,192 |
| 13 | 13 | Fri, Sept 30 | at Saskatchewan Roughriders | W 19–16 | 6–6–1 | Taylor Field | 23,669 |
| 14 | 14 | Sat, Oct 8 | vs. Toronto Argonauts | W 34–32 | 7–6–1 | Hornet Stadium | 13,050 |
| 15 | 15 | Sun, Oct 16 | at Shreveport Pirates | L 12–24 | 7–7–1 | Independence Stadium | 12,465 |
| 16 | 16 | Sat, Oct 22 | vs. Ottawa Rough Riders | W 44–9 | 8–7–1 | Hornet Stadium | 13,760 |
| 17 | 17 | Sat, Oct 29 | at Edmonton Eskimos | L 16–22 | 8–8–1 | Commonwealth Stadium | 29,332 |
| 18 | 18 | Sat, Nov 5 | vs. Baltimore CFLers | W 18–0 | 9–8–1 | Hornet Stadium | 14,056 |

== Roster ==
1994 Sacramento Gold Miners final roster
| Quarterbacks: 18 David Archer; 12 Kerwin Bell; 15 Jimmy Kemp; Running backs: 28 Tony Burse; 27 Charles Miles; 20 Troy Mills; 33 Mike Oliphant; Receivers: 80 Willie Bouyer; 83 Marcus Dowdell; 6 David Gamble; 7 Tony Hargain; 81 Rod Harris; 87 James Pruitt; 82 Myron Wise | Offensive linemen: 64 John Buddenberg T; 52 David Diaz-Infante G; 53 Chris Dyko T; 69 Chuck Esty G; 63 Mike Kiselak C; 65 Peter Shorts T; 60 Robert Stevenson G; Defensive linemen: 93 George Bethune DT; 56 Roosevelt Collins DE; 78 Willie Fears DT; 58 Dave Harper DE; 98 Greg Joelson DT; 37 James King DE; 73 Mark Ledbetter DE | Linebackers: 44 Hurlie Brown; 50 Corian Freeman; 97 Maurice Miller; 94 Curtis Moore; 90 Leonard Nelson; 55 Tommie Smith; Defensive backs: 10 Malcolm Frank; 17 Charles Franks; 45 Tommy Gerhart; 39 Bobby Humphery; 26 Doug Parrish; 27 Junior Robinson; 24 Jason Wallace; 25 Kenny Wilhite; Special teams: 14 Roman Anderson K; 16 Pete Gardere P; Italics indicate American player |
