= 1994 Las Vegas Posse season =

Canadian football team season in US

- Owner: Nick Mileti
- Head coach: Ron Meyer
- Home stadium: Sam Boyd Stadium

Results
- Record: 5–13
- Division place: 6th, West Division
- Playoffs: did not qualify

Uniform
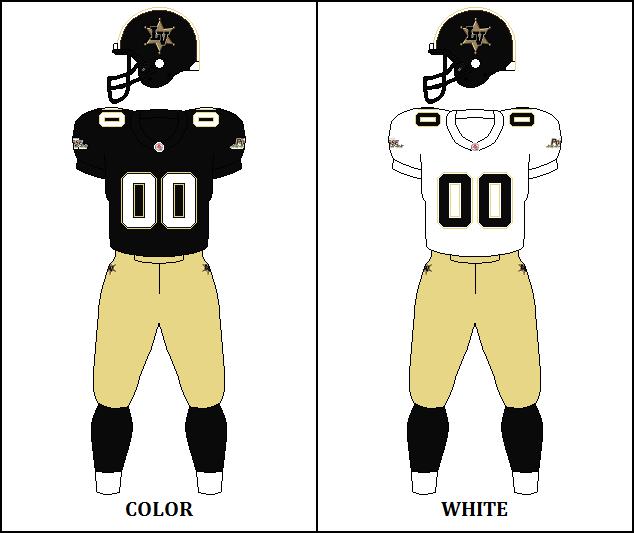

The 1994 Las Vegas Posse season was the first and only season in the team's franchise history. They finished sixth and last place in the West Division with a 5–13 record and failed to make the playoffs. It marked the only season with which the team would play; the organization became insolvent and was subsequently dissolved at the conclusion of the season. Anthony Calvillo was the last member on the active roster for the Las Vegas Posse to have played in the Canadian Football League (CFL) at the time of his retirement in January 2014 after the 2013 CFL season had ended two months prior.

== Preseason ==
| Game | Date | Opponent | Results | | Venue | Attendance |
| Game | Date | Opponent | Score | Record | Venue | Attendance |
|---|---|---|---|---|---|---|
| A | Mon, June 20 | at BC Lions | W 47–12 | 1–0 | BC Place | 18,911 |
| B | Wed, June 29 | vs. Edmonton Eskimos | W 22–11 | 2–0 | Sam Boyd Stadium | 6,280 |

== Regular season ==
=== Season standings ===
West Division
| Pos | Team | Pld | W | L | T | PF | PA | PD | Pts | Div | Stk |
|---|---|---|---|---|---|---|---|---|---|---|---|
| 1 | Calgary Stampeders (Q) | 18 | 15 | 3 | 0 | 698 | 355 | 343 | 30 | 8–2 | W3 |
| 2 | Edmonton Eskimos (Q) | 18 | 13 | 5 | 0 | 518 | 401 | 117 | 26 | 7–3 | W2 |
| 3 | BC Lions (Q) | 18 | 11 | 6 | 1 | 604 | 456 | 148 | 23 | 5–4–1 | L1 |
| 4 | Saskatchewan Roughriders (Q) | 18 | 11 | 7 | 0 | 512 | 454 | 58 | 22 | 4–6 | W4 |
| 5 | Sacramento Gold Miners | 18 | 9 | 8 | 1 | 436 | 436 | 0 | 19 | 3–6–1 | W1 |
| 6 | Las Vegas Posse | 18 | 5 | 13 | 0 | 447 | 622 | −175 | 10 | 2–8 | L6 |

Source: "CFL.ca". Archived from the original on July 15, 2009.
(Q) Qualified for playoffs

=== Season schedule ===
| Week | Game | Date | Opponent | Results | | Venue | Attendance |
| Week | Game | Date | Opponent | Score | Record | Venue | Attendance |
|---|---|---|---|---|---|---|---|
| 1 | 1 | Fri, July 8 | at Sacramento Gold Miners | W 32–26 | 1–0 | Hornet Stadium | 14,816 |
| 2 | 2 | Sat, July 16 | vs. Saskatchewan Roughriders | W 32–22 (OT) | 2–0 | Sam Boyd Stadium | 12,213 |
| 3 | 3 | Sat, July 23 | vs. Sacramento Gold Miners | L 20–22 | 2–1 | Sam Boyd Stadium | 10,740 |
| 4 | 4 | Fri, July 29 | at Toronto Argonauts | L 20–39 | 2–2 | Skydome | 14,296 |
| 5 | 5 | Sat, Aug 6 | vs. Baltimore CFLers | L 33–38 | 2–3 | Sam Boyd Stadium | 10,122 |
| 6 | 6 | Sat, Aug 13 | at Shreveport Pirates | W 49–13 | 3–3 | Independence Stadium | 18,011 |
| 7 | 7 | Sat, Aug 20 | vs. BC Lions | L 16–39 | 3–4 | Sam Boyd Stadium | 14,432 |
| 8 | 8 | Thurs, Aug 25 | at Edmonton Eskimos | L 17–44 | 3–5 | Commonwealth Stadium | 28,559 |
| 9 | 9 | Sat, Sept 3 | at Ottawa Rough Riders | L 50–54 (OT) | 3–6 | Frank Clair Stadium | 17,732 |
| 10 | 10 | Sat, Sept 10 | vs. Shreveport Pirates | W 34–21 | 4–6 | Sam Boyd Stadium | 9,467 |
| 11 | 11 | Fri, Sept 16 | at Calgary Stampeders | L 25–35 | 4–7 | McMahon Stadium | 24,852 |
| 12 | 12 | Sat, Sept 24 | vs. Hamilton Tiger-Cats | W 25–21 | 5–7 | Sam Boyd Stadium | 4,761 |
| 13 | 13 | Sun, Oct 2 | vs. Calgary Stampeders | L 26–45 | 5–8 | Sam Boyd Stadium | 7,438 |
| 14 | 14 | Fri, Oct 7 | at Baltimore CFLers | L 16–22 | 5–9 | Memorial Stadium | 34,186 |
| 15 | 15 | Sat, Oct 15 | vs. Winnipeg Blue Bombers | L 17–48 | 5–10 | Sam Boyd Stadium | 2,350 |
| 16 | 16 | Sun, Oct 23 | at Saskatchewan Roughriders | L 18–37 | 5–11 | Taylor Field | 28,583 |
| 17 | 17 | Sat, Oct 29 | at BC Lions | L 7–45 | 5–12 | BC Place | 22,701 |
| 18 | 18 | Sat, Nov 5 | at Edmonton Eskimos* | L 10–51 | 5–13 | Commonwealth Stadium | 14,228 |

- (*) Due to low attendance numbers, the final home game of the season was moved to Commonwealth Stadium in Edmonton, Alberta.

== Roster ==
1994 Las Vegas Posse final roster
| Quarterbacks: 13 Anthony Calvillo; 12 Len Williams; Running backs: 3 Darian Hagan; 85 Kalin Hall; 36 Aubrey Thompson; Receivers: 81 Robert Claiborne; 89 Curtis Mayfield; 86 Michael Stephens; 80 Tamarick Vanover; 82 Prince Wimbley; Special teams: 8 Carlos Huerta K; 10 Robbie Keen P/K | Offensive linemen: 51 Joe Garten G; 50 Craig Gibson C; 53 Kelvin Harris C; 54 Haywood Haynes G; 57 Brandon Houston T; 69 Ben Jefferson T; 60 Claude Jones G; 63 Bob Kronenberg C; 65 Russ McCullough T; 66 John Nee T; 64 James Richards G; 55 Ron Shipley C; Defensive linemen: 92 Steve Anderson DE; 97 Jeff Cummins NT; 52 Keith Embray DE; 75 Roy Hart NT; 95 Leonard Johnson NT; 93 Dan Sileo NT; 98 Jason Medlock DE; 97 Jeff Sawyer DE | Linebackers: 44 Zock Allen; 32 Jessie Becton; 39 Tim Broady; 15 Cedric Crawford; 32 Brad Lacombe; 7 David Maeva; 20 Shonte Peoples; 26 Nick Smith; 35 Greg Tucker; Defensive backs: 1 Anthony Blue; 9 James Bullock; 16 Mike Clark; 2 Eric Geter; 25 David Hollis; 27 Al Jordan; 11 Maurice Kelly; 4 Calvin Nicholson; 19 Don Robinson; Italics indicate American player |
