= 1994 CFL season =

Canadian Football League season

- Duration: July 6 – November 6, 1994
- East champions: Baltimore CFLers
- West champions: BC Lions

82nd Grey Cup
- Date: November 27, 1994
- Venue: BC Place Stadium, Vancouver
- Champions: BC Lions

CFL seasons
- ← 1993 1995 →

Canadian Football League team locations: West, East

The 1994 CFL season is considered to be the 41st season in modern-day Canadian football, although it is officially the 37th Canadian Football League season.

== CFL news in 1994 ==
=== Expansion ===
The CFL admitted three more United States-based teams, to add to the Sacramento Gold Miners, who were introduced in 1993.

The Las Vegas Posse, the Shreveport Pirates and the Baltimore CFLers made the league 12 teams in total, six in each division. The new teams started play in 1994, with Las Vegas joining the Sacramento Gold Miners in the West Division, and Baltimore and Shreveport joining the East Division.

The Baltimore team was to be called the Baltimore Colts, but the Colts name was revoked due to a successful trademark infringement lawsuit filed by the Indianapolis Colts, and they played the entire season as the "Baltimore CFLers".

=== Regular season structure ===
Due to the expansion, this was the first season since 1980 when CFL teams did not travel to every other stadium in the League during the season.

CFL teams played each team in their own division twice, two teams in the other division twice, and the four remaining teams in the other division only once. The two inter-Divisional opponents to be played twice were determined by the previous season's regular season standing. Teams who had finished first and third in 1993 played the first and third teams from the other division twice – and the same applied to the teams who had finished second and fourth in each division, and the effective "fifth" and "sixth" place teams. Since Sacramento finished fifth in 1993, and since the other three U.S. expansion teams were deemed "fifth" and "sixth" place for the purposes of the schedule, this format ensured that the U.S. teams all played one another twice for the 1994 season.

The divisions were rearranged again in the 1995 CFL season, when the league expanded to 13 teams for one season.

=== Ownership changes ===
In February, Bruce Firestone purchased the Ottawa Rough Riders from the Glieberman family, clearing the way for the Gliebermans to assume the Shreveport Pirates.

In May, the JLL Broadcast Group purchased the Toronto Argonauts after John Candy died (Candy had put his stake in the team up for sale hours before he died) and Bruce McNall was arrested on fraud charges.

=== Uniform changes ===
The Ottawa Rough Riders unveiled a new logo based on a head profile of a mustached lumberjack. Their colours were also updated with light navy replacing black and the addition of metallic gold, red was kept.

New logos and uniforms also were designed for the expansion teams in Baltimore, Las Vegas and Shreveport. The Shreveport Pirates' team colours were purple, silver, orange and black with a side profile of a pirate's head inside a delta. The Las Vegas Posse chose a simpler logo and colour choice. The logo was a sheriff's tin star with "LV" imposed on it. Their colours were black and desert sand. Baltimore adopted a color scheme that added silver to the Colts' traditional colors of blue and white, as well as a stylized horse's head logo. Despite the team being unable to use the "Colts" name, it continued using the logo and colours for the entire season as well as the following season, by which time owner Jim Speros had settled on "Stallions" as his team's official nickname.

=== Game records set ===
In a July 14, 1994, matchup of the Winnipeg Blue Bombers and Edmonton Eskimos, Matt Dunigan passed for a remarkable 713 yards, setting a CFL record that still stands.

Allen Pitts set the record for receiving yards in one season with 2,036 yards while his teammate Doug Flutie set the record for passing touchdowns with 48.

=== The Grey Cup ===
BC Place Stadium played host to the Grey Cup game on Sunday, November 27, making Vancouver the host city for the twelfth time-more than any other Western Canadian city. In the Grey Cup game, the hometown BC Lions were against the Baltimore CFLers, becoming the first ever Grey Cup game between a Canada-based team and a US-based team. The Lions ended up defeating the Baltimore team by a score of 26–23, on Lui Passaglia's game-winning field goal on the last play of the game.

== Regular season standings ==
West Division
Pos	Team	Pld	W	L	T	PF	PA	PD	Pts	Div	Stk
1	Calgary Stampeders (Q)	18	15	3	0	698	355	343	30	8–2	W3
2	Edmonton Eskimos (Q)	18	13	5	0	518	401	117	26	7–3	W2
3	BC Lions (Q)	18	11	6	1	604	456	148	23	5–4–1	L1
4	Saskatchewan Roughriders (Q)	18	11	7	0	512	454	58	22	4–6	W4
5	Sacramento Gold Miners	18	9	8	1	436	436	0	19	3–6–1	W1
6	Las Vegas Posse	18	5	13	0	447	622	−175	10	2–8	L6

Source: "CFL.ca". Archived from the original on July 15, 2009.
(Q) Qualified for playoffs

East Division
Pos	Team	Pld	W	L	T	PF	PA	PD	Pts	Div	Stk
1	Winnipeg Blue Bombers (Q)	18	13	5	0	651	572	79	26	9–1	W1
2	Baltimore CFLers (Q)	18	12	6	0	561	431	130	24	8-2	L1
3	Toronto Argonauts (Q)	18	7	11	0	504	578	−74	14	5–5	L2
4	Ottawa Rough Riders (Q)	18	4	14	0	480	647	−167	8	3–7	L7
5	Hamilton Tiger-Cats	18	4	14	0	435	562	−127	8	3–7	L3
6	Shreveport Pirates	18	3	15	0	330	661	−331	6	2–8	W2

Source: "CFL.ca". Archived from the original on July 15, 2009.
(Q) Qualified for playoffs

== Grey Cup playoffs ==
The BC Lions are the 1994 Grey Cup champions, defeating the Baltimore CFLers 26–23, in front of their home crowd at Vancouver's BC Place Stadium. It was the first football championship game between Canadian and American teams. The CFLers' Karl Anthony (DB) was named the Grey Cup's Most Valuable Player and Lions' Lui Passaglia (K/P) was the Grey Cup's Most Valuable Canadian.

=== Playoff bracket ===
November 12 & 13: Division Semifinals
E3	Toronto Argonauts	15
E2	Baltimore CFLers	34
East
E4	Ottawa Rough Riders	16
E1	Winnipeg Blue Bombers	26
W3	BC Lions	24
W2	Edmonton Eskimos	23
West
W4	Saskatchewan Roughriders	3
W1	Calgary Stampeders	36

November 20: Division Finals
E2	Baltimore CFLers	14
E1	Winnipeg Blue Bombers	12
W3	BC Lions	37
W1	Calgary Stampeders	36

November 27: 82nd Grey Cup @ BC Place Stadium – Vancouver, BC
E2	Baltimore CFLers	23
W3	BC Lions	26

== 1994 CFL All-Stars ==
=== Offence ===
- QB – Doug Flutie, Calgary Stampeders
- FB – Sean Millington, BC Lions
- RB – Mike Pringle, Baltimore CFLers
- SB – Allen Pitts, Calgary Stampeders
- SB – Gerald Wilcox, Winnipeg Blue Bombers
- WR – Paul Masotti, Toronto Argonauts
- WR – Rod Harris, Sacramento Gold Miners
- C – Mike Anderson, Saskatchewan Roughriders
- OG – Pierre Vercheval, Toronto Argonauts
- OG – Rocco Romano, Calgary Stampeders
- OT – Shar Pourdanesh, Baltimore CFLers
- OT – Chris Walby, Winnipeg Blue Bombers

=== Defence ===
- DT – Bennie Goods, Edmonton Eskimos
- DT – Rodney Harding, Toronto Argonauts
- DE – Will Johnson, Calgary Stampeders
- DE – Tim Cofield, Hamilton Tiger-Cats
- LB – Ron Goetz, Saskatchewan Roughriders
- LB – Willie Pless, Edmonton Eskimos
- LB – Calvin Tiggle, Toronto Argonauts
- CB – Less Browne, BC Lions
- CB – Irvin Smith, Baltimore CFLers
- DB – Charles Gordon, BC Lions
- DB – Robert Holland, Edmonton Eskimos
- DS – Greg Knox, Calgary Stampeders

=== Special teams ===
- P – Josh Miller, Baltimore CFLers
- K – Mark McLoughlin, Calgary Stampeders
- ST – Henry "Gizmo" Williams, Edmonton Eskimos

== 1994 Western All-Stars ==
=== Offence ===
- QB – Doug Flutie, Calgary Stampeders
- FB – Sean Millington, BC Lions
- RB – Mike Saunders, Saskatchewan Roughriders
- SB – Allen Pitts, Calgary Stampeders
- SB – Darren Flutie, BC Lions
- WR – Ray Alexander, BC Lions
- WR – Rod Harris, Sacramento Gold Miners
- C – Mike Anderson, Saskatchewan Roughriders
- OG – Rob Smith, BC Lions
- OG – Rocco Romano, Calgary Stampeders
- OT – Bruce Covernton, Calgary Stampeders
- OT – Blake Dermott, Edmonton Eskimos

=== Defence ===
- DT – Bennie Goods, Edmonton Eskimos
- DT – Stu Laird, Calgary Stampeders
- DE – Will Johnson, Calgary Stampeders
- DE – Bobby Jurasin, Saskatchewan Roughriders
- LB – Ron Goetz, Saskatchewan Roughriders
- LB – Willie Pless, Edmonton Eskimos
- LB – Marvin Pope, Calgary Stampeders
- CB – Less Browne, BC Lions
- CB – Albert Brown, Saskatchewan Roughriders
- DB – Charles Gordon, BC Lions
- DB – Robert Holland, Edmonton Eskimos
- DS – Greg Knox, Calgary Stampeders

=== Special teams ===
- P – Tony Martino, Calgary Stampeders
- K – Mark McLoughlin, Calgary Stampeders
- ST – Henry "Gizmo" Williams, Edmonton Eskimos

== 1994 Eastern All-Stars ==
=== Offence ===
- QB – Matt Dunigan, Winnipeg Blue Bombers
- FB – Peter Tuipulotu, Baltimore CFLers
- RB – Mike Pringle, Baltimore CFLers
- SB – Chris Armstrong, Baltimore CFLers
- SB – Gerald Wilcox, Winnipeg Blue Bombers
- WR – Paul Masotti, Toronto Argonauts
- WR – Earl Winfield, Hamilton Tiger-Cats
- C – Nick Subis, Baltimore CFLers
- OG – Pierre Vercheval, Toronto Argonauts
- OG – David Black, Winnipeg Blue Bombers
- OT – Shar Pourdanesh, Baltimore CFLers
- OT – Chris Walby, Winnipeg Blue Bombers

=== Defence ===
- DT – Ben Williams, Shreveport Pirates
- DT – Rodney Harding, Toronto Argonauts
- DE – John Kropke, Ottawa Rough Riders
- DE – Tim Cofield, Hamilton Tiger-Cats
- LB – Daved Benefield, Ottawa Rough Riders
- LB – Mike O'Shea, Hamilton Tiger-Cats
- LB – Calvin Tiggle, Toronto Argonauts
- CB – Donald Smith, Winnipeg Blue Bombers
- CB – Irvin Smith, Baltimore CFLers
- DB – Joe Fuller, Shreveport Pirates
- DB – Bobby Evans, Winnipeg Blue Bombers
- DS – Michael Brooks, Baltimore CFLers

=== Special teams ===
- P – Josh Miller, Baltimore CFLers
- K – Troy Westwood, Winnipeg Blue Bombers
- ST – Pinball Clemons, Toronto Argonauts

== 1994 CFL awards ==
- CFL's Most Outstanding Player Award – Doug Flutie (QB), Calgary Stampeders
- CFL's Most Outstanding Canadian Award – Gerald Wilcox (SB), Winnipeg Blue Bombers
- CFL's Most Outstanding Defensive Player Award – Willie Pless (LB), Edmonton Eskimos
- CFL's Most Outstanding Offensive Lineman Award – Shar Pourdanesh (OT), Baltimore CFLers
- CFL's Most Outstanding Rookie Award – Matt Goodwin (DB), Baltimore CFLers
- CFLPA's Outstanding Community Service Award – O. J. Brigance (LB), Baltimore CFLers
- CFL's Coach of the Year – Don Matthews, Baltimore CFLers
- Commissioner's Award - Norm Fieldgate, BC Lions
