= Belzoni, Mississippi =

- City
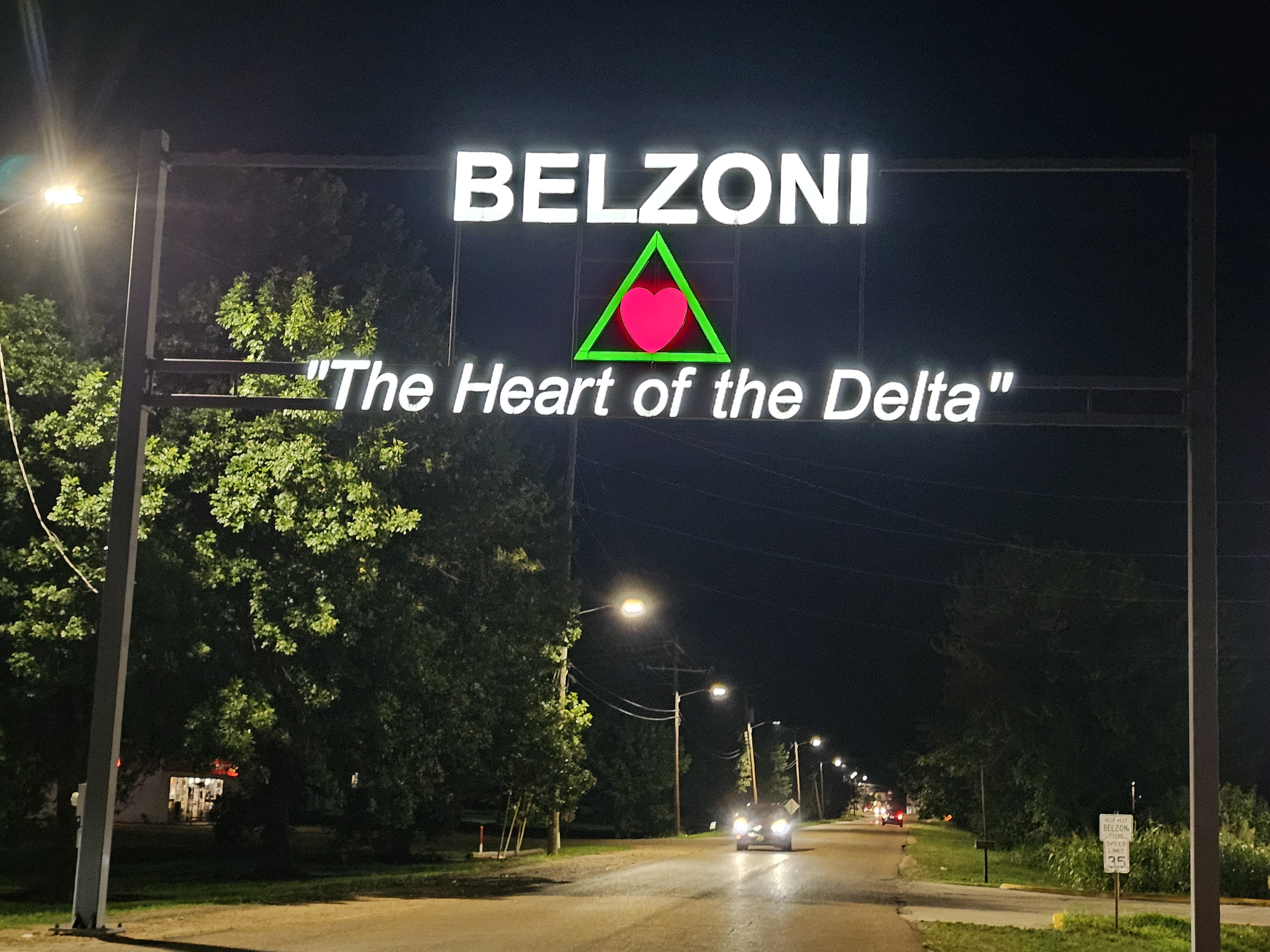
- The Heart of The Delta sign in Belzoni

- Flag
- Motto: "Heart Of The Delta"
- Location of Belzoni, Mississippi

- Location in the United States
- Coordinates: 33°10′50″N 90°29′11″W
- Country: United States
- State: Mississippi
- County: Humphreys

Area
  - Total: 1.02 sq mi (2.64 km^{2})
  - Land: 1.02 sq mi (2.64 km^{2})
  - Water: 0 sq mi (0.00 km^{2})
- Elevation: 112 ft (34 m)

Population (2020)
  - Total: 1,938
  - Density: 1,902.5/sq mi (734.56/km^{2})
- Time zone: UTC-6 (Central (CST))
  - Summer (DST): UTC-5 (CDT)
- ZIP code: 39038
- Area code: 662
- FIPS code: 28-05140
- GNIS feature ID: 2403852
- Website: www.belzonims.com/profbel.htm

Belzoni (/bɛlˈzoʊnə/ bel-ZOHN-ə) is a city in Humphreys County, Mississippi, United States, in the Mississippi Delta region, on the Yazoo River. As of the 2020 census, Belzoni had a population of 1,938. It is the county seat of Humphreys County. It was named for the 19th-century Italian archaeologist/explorer Giovanni Battista Belzoni.

The area was named Farm-Raised Catfish Capital of the World in 1976 by then Governor Cliff Finch, since it produces more farm-raised catfish than any other U.S. county. About 40,000 acres (160 km^{2}) of the county are under water in ponds used to grow catfish. About 60% of U.S. farm-raised catfish are grown within a 65-mile (100-km) radius of Belzoni. The title "Catfish Capital" is also claimed by Savannah, Tennessee, Des Allemands, Louisiana, and Selkirk, Manitoba. Belzoni is known for the World Catfish Festival held every April. The festival, which began in 1976, attracts over 10,000 visitors annually and includes unique events such as a catfish eating contest and the Miss Catfish pageant, where contestants are tested on their knowledge of the aquaculture industry.

== History ==
The area that eventually became Belzoni was originally known as "Greasy Row" because of saloons along the bank of the Yazoo River, which was the main transportation route until replaced by railroads. In 1895, a charter was granted for the village of Belzoni, although the area had been settled by European Americans and African Americans for several decades previously. It was developed for cotton plantations before the Civil War and relied on agriculture well into the 20th century. Steve Castleman, who secured the charter, was elected as the first mayor of Belzoni. When Humphreys County was formed by the state legislature in 1918, Belzoni was selected as the county seat.

=== Civil rights movement ===
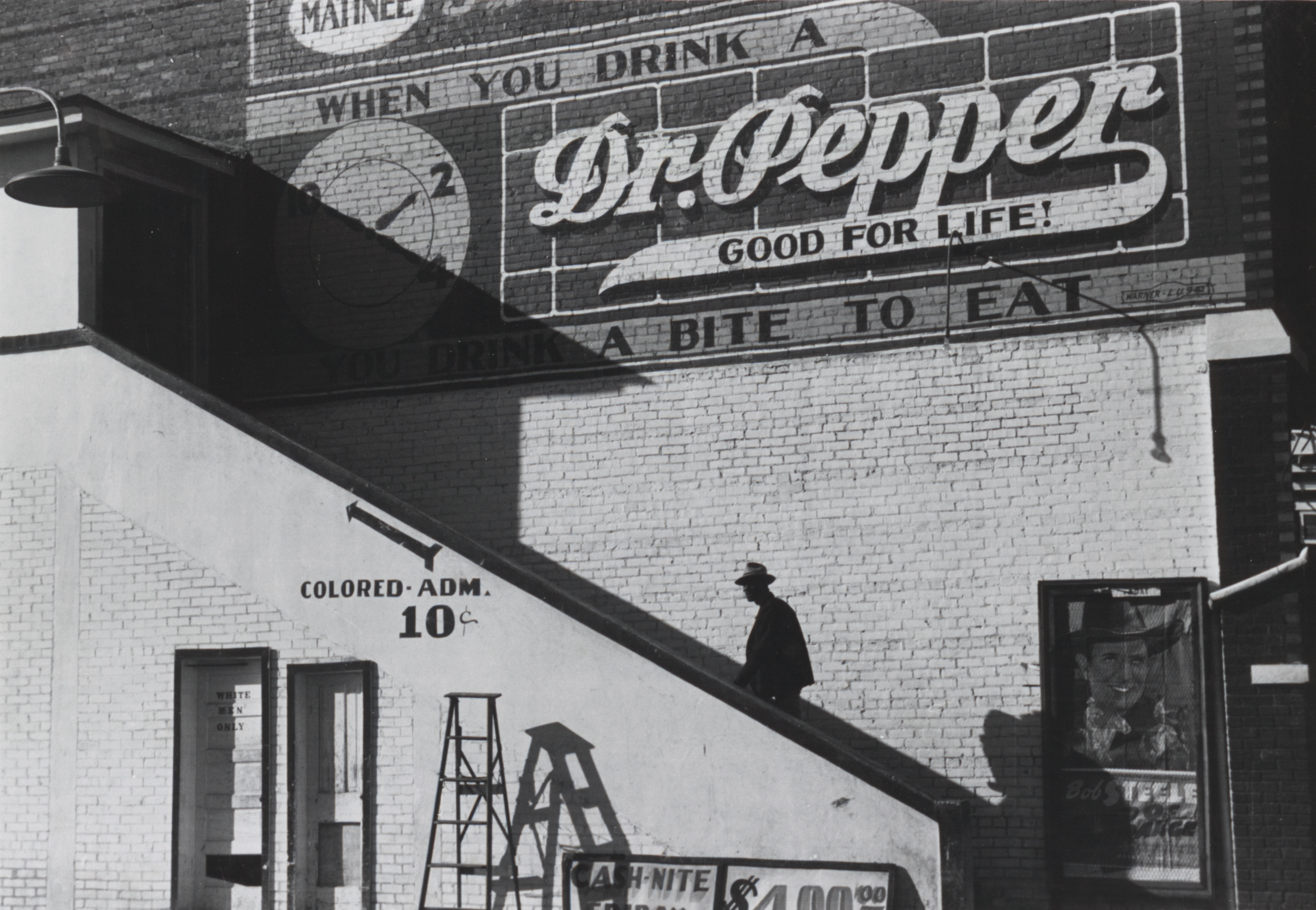
Segregated movie theater in Belzoni, 1939

Belzoni was the site of the murder of an early civil rights pioneer. The Rev. George W. Lee, an African-American minister who was seeking voting rights for the disenfranchised blacks of the Mississippi Delta and registered to vote, was murdered in 1955 in "Bloody Belzoni" by white residents committed to upholding segregation. His killers were never found, as the governor of Mississippi, Hugh L. White, refused to investigate the case. Many consider Lee the first martyr of the modern civil rights movement.

As an undergraduate at the University of California, Berkeley, Margot Adler, later a National Public Radio correspondent, was active in the voter registration drive in Humphreys County (Belzoni) in the summer of 1965, before the passage of the Voting Rights Act on August 6 of that year. In 2000, she recalled:

"I remember how difficult it was to register people: the fear was palpable. I remember that after one month of daily work there were only seven people registered, and a bunch of us almost got ourselves killed after being chased onto private property by a group of men who belonged to the White Citizens' Council".

She said that the civil rights movement changed Humphreys County, and bettered the lot of African Americans.

"There was real change in Belzoni. Streets were paved in hog town, sewers no longer overflowed into the dirt streets. Several black families I knew from then have held political office during the last decade".

=== Recent history ===
In 2006, Belzoni elected Wardell Walton as mayor, the first African-American to hold the position. He was re-elected to a second term. He was succeeded in 2013 by Lenora Sutton, the first female mayor of Belzoni. In 2017 Carol M. Ivy was elected mayor.

=== Historical markers and attractions ===
Belzoni's role in history has been recognized primarily through historical marker campaigns. The Mississippi Blues Trail has two markers located in city limits: one for Denise LaSalle, who spent her childhood in Belzoni; and another for Turner's Drug Store, an early sponsor for radio shows that broadcast Delta blues, and location of some performances by native artists Sonny Boy Williamson II and Elmore James. There is a marker for Reverend George Lee as part of the Mississippi Freedom Trail, detailing his contribution to the Civil Rights Movement in Mississippi, located near his burial site. In 1990, the local African-American community placed concrete markers on each side of George Lee Avenue.

Other attractions located in Belzoni include the Catfish Museum; Jaketown Museum, which contains artifacts of a nearby Native American mound; Mama's Dream World, a museum commemorating Ethel Wright Mohamed; and Wister Gardens, a local garden highlighting local flowers and plant life, often used for events in the area.

In the early-2000s, the city, in conjunction with the Humphreys County Art Council and Belzoni-Humphreys Development Foundation, sponsored the art project Catfish on Parade, a collection of fiberglass catfish decorated by local artists. Each catfish's design is based on a reference to its specific commercial sponsor ("D. Fin-Der, Esquire" sponsored by a local law firm) or on a theme chosen by that sponsor ("Fishin' for Words", detailing works and images of famous Mississippi writers).

== Geography ==
According to the United States Census Bureau, the city has a total area of 1.0 square mile (2.6 km^{2}), all land.

=== Climate ===
The climate in this area is characterized by relatively high temperatures and evenly distributed precipitation throughout the year. According to the Köppen climate classification system, Belzoni has a humid subtropical climate, Cfa on climate maps.

Climate data for Belzoni, Mississippi (1991–2020 normals, extremes 1930–present)
Month	Jan	Feb	Mar	Apr	May	Jun	Jul	Aug	Sep	Oct	Nov	Dec	Year
Record high °F (°C)	85 (29)	84 (29)	89 (32)	95 (35)	101 (38)	108 (42)	108 (42)	106 (41)	106 (41)	97 (36)	89 (32)	84 (29)	108 (42)
Mean maximum °F (°C)	72.1 (22.3)	75.6 (24.2)	82.0 (27.8)	86.8 (30.4)	91.9 (33.3)	95.7 (35.4)	97.6 (36.4)	98.2 (36.8)	96.0 (35.6)	90.0 (32.2)	81.3 (27.4)	74.4 (23.6)	99.2 (37.3)
Mean daily maximum °F (°C)	52.7 (11.5)	57.2 (14.0)	65.6 (18.7)	73.9 (23.3)	81.9 (27.7)	88.1 (31.2)	90.2 (32.3)	91.0 (32.8)	86.7 (30.4)	76.4 (24.7)	64.1 (17.8)	55.3 (12.9)	73.6 (23.1)
Daily mean °F (°C)	44.4 (6.9)	48.5 (9.2)	56.3 (13.5)	64.1 (17.8)	73.1 (22.8)	79.5 (26.4)	81.8 (27.7)	81.6 (27.6)	76.4 (24.7)	65.6 (18.7)	54.6 (12.6)	46.9 (8.3)	64.4 (18.0)
Mean daily minimum °F (°C)	36.1 (2.3)	39.7 (4.3)	47.0 (8.3)	54.3 (12.4)	65.3 (18.5)	71.0 (21.7)	73.5 (23.1)	72.3 (22.4)	66.1 (18.9)	54.9 (12.7)	45.0 (7.2)	38.6 (3.7)	55.2 (12.9)
Mean minimum °F (°C)	19.7 (−6.8)	24.3 (−4.3)	30.0 (−1.1)	39.0 (3.9)	49.6 (9.8)	61.4 (16.3)	65.6 (18.7)	63.7 (17.6)	52.1 (11.2)	39.0 (3.9)	28.4 (−2.0)	24.6 (−4.1)	17.6 (−8.0)
Record low °F (°C)	−1 (−18)	5 (−15)	14 (−10)	28 (−2)	38 (3)	46 (8)	52 (11)	52 (11)	35 (2)	26 (−3)	16 (−9)	1 (−17)	−1 (−18)
Average precipitation inches (mm)	5.37 (136)	5.13 (130)	5.79 (147)	5.97 (152)	5.71 (145)	3.75 (95)	4.22 (107)	3.77 (96)	3.26 (83)	4.29 (109)	4.47 (114)	5.53 (140)	57.26 (1,454)
Average snowfall inches (cm)	0.0 (0.0)	0.1 (0.25)	0.0 (0.0)	0.0 (0.0)	0.0 (0.0)	0.0 (0.0)	0.0 (0.0)	0.0 (0.0)	0.0 (0.0)	0.0 (0.0)	0.0 (0.0)	0.0 (0.0)	0.1 (0.25)
Average precipitation days (≥ 0.01 in)	8.9	8.9	9.1	8.3	8.6	7.2	7.5	5.8	4.7	5.4	7.2	8.7	90.3
Average snowy days (≥ 0.1 in)	0.1	0.1	0.0	0.0	0.0	0.0	0.0	0.0	0.0	0.0	0.0	0.0	0.2
Source: NOAAIEM

== Demographics ==
Historical population
Census	Pop.	Note	%±
1900	263		—
1910	1,059		302.7%
1920	2,277		115.0%
1930	2,735		20.1%
1940	3,789		38.5%
1950	4,071		7.4%
1960	4,142		1.7%
1970	3,394		−18.1%
1980	2,982		−12.1%
1990	2,536		−15.0%
2000	2,663		5.0%
2010	2,235		−16.1%
2020	1,938		−13.3%
U.S. Decennial Census

=== Racial and ethnic composition ===
Belzoni city, Mississippi – Racial and ethnic composition Note: the US Census treats Hispanic/Latino as an ethnic category. This table excludes Latinos from the racial categories and assigns them to a separate category. Hispanics/Latinos may be of any race.
Race / Ethnicity (NH = Non-Hispanic)	Pop 2000	Pop 2010	Pop 2020	% 2000	% 2010	% 2020
White alone (NH)	810	500	275	30.42%	22.37%	14.19%
Black or African American alone (NH)	1,794	1,681	1,592	67.37%	75.21%	82.15%
Native American or Alaska Native alone (NH)	1	4	3	0.04%	0.18%	0.15%
Asian alone (NH)	17	14	10	0.64%	0.63%	0.52%
Native Hawaiian or Pacific Islander alone (NH)	0	0	0	0.00%	0.00%	0.00%
Other race alone (NH)	2	0	0	0.08%	0.00%	0.00%
Mixed race or Multiracial (NH)	3	6	41	0.11%	0.27%	2.12%
Hispanic or Latino (any race)	36	30	17	1.35%	1.34%	0.88%
Total	2,663	2,235	1,938	100.00%	100.00%	100.00%

=== 2020 census ===
As of the 2020 census, Belzoni had a population of 1,938. There were 758 households and 525 families residing in the city. The median age was 39.1 years. 25.4% of residents were under the age of 18 and 18.0% of residents were 65 years of age or older. For every 100 females there were 88.9 males, and for every 100 females age 18 and over there were 81.0 males age 18 and over.

0.0% of residents lived in urban areas, while 100.0% lived in rural areas.

Of the 758 households in Belzoni, 34.8% had children under the age of 18 living in them. Of all households, 27.3% were married-couple households, 20.1% were households with a male householder and no spouse or partner present, and 47.8% were households with a female householder and no spouse or partner present. About 33.7% of all households were made up of individuals and 14.4% had someone living alone who was 65 years of age or older.

There were 879 housing units, of which 13.8% were vacant. The homeowner vacancy rate was 3.8% and the rental vacancy rate was 2.9%.

Racial composition as of the 2020 census
Race	Number	Percent
White	278	14.3%
Black or African American	1,602	82.7%
American Indian and Alaska Native	3	0.2%
Asian	10	0.5%
Native Hawaiian and Other Pacific Islander	0	0.0%
Some other race	0	0.0%
Two or more races	45	2.3%

=== 2000 census ===
As of the census of 2000, there were 2,663 people, 934 households, and 640 families residing in the city. The population density was 2,777.8 inhabitants per square mile (1,072.5/km^{2}). The 1,018 housing units averaged 1,061.9 per square mile (410.0/km^{2}). The racial makeup of the city was 30.49% White, 68.08% Black, 0.04% Native American, 0.64% Asian, 0.60% from other races, and 0.15% from two or more races. Hispanics or Latinos of any race were 1.35% of the population.

Of the 934 households, 33.8% had children under the age of 18 living with them, 35.3% were married couples living together, 28.6% had a female householder with no husband present, and 31.4% were not families. 28.2% of all households were made up of individuals, and 11.8% had someone living alone who was 65 years of age or older. The average household size was 2.83 and the average family size was 3.49.

In the city, the population was distributed as 32.2% under the age of 18, 11.4% from 18 to 24, 27.3% from 25 to 44, 17.8% from 45 to 64, and 11.3% who were 65 years of age or older. The median age was 30 years. For every 100 females, there were 85.7 males. For every 100 females age 18 and over, there were 77.5 males.

The median income for a household in the city was $20,690, and for a family was $25,521. Males had a median income of $26,466 versus $15,833 for females. The per capita income for the city was $13,022. About 29.3% of families and 35.0% of the population were below the poverty line, including 47.4% of those under age 18 and 27.3% of those age 65 or over.

== Education ==
=== Public schools ===
The City of Belzoni is served by the Humphreys County School District:

- Humphreys County High School
- Thomas C. Randle Career and Technical Center
- Humphreys County Junior High School
- O.M. McNair Upper Elementary School
- Ida Greene Lower Elementary School

=== Private schools ===
- Humphreys Academy

== Media ==
- Radio stations
  - WELZ 1460AM (Country)
  - WBYP 107.1FM (Country)
- Newspaper
  - Belzoni Banner

== Notable people ==
- Eddie "Guitar" Burns, Delta blues musician
- Jim Clark, head football coach at McNeese State University from 1966 to 1969
- Boyd Gilmore, Delta blues singer and guitarist
- Charles Gordon, film producer. Brother to Lawrence Gordon.
- Lawrence Gordon, film producer and former president of 20th Century Fox and American International Pictures
- Elmore James, blues guitarist
- Denise LaSalle, blues singer and member of the Rhythm and Blues Music Hall of Fame was raised in Belzoni.
- Ethel Wright Mohamed, 'Grandma Moses of Stitchery'
- Ollie Mohamed, former member of the Mississippi Senate
- Pinetop Perkins, Grammy Award winning blues musician, and Blues Hall of Famer was born in Belzoni in 1913.
- Otis Spann, blues pianist and longtime member of Muddy Waters's band
- Benjamin Swan, member of Massachusetts House of Representatives
- Monroe Swan, Wisconsin State Senate
- Ernie Terrell, boxer
- Jean Terrell, R&B and jazz singer, replaced Diana Ross in The Supremes in 1970
- Herb Washington, track and field athlete and Major League Baseball player
- Annette Polly Williams, Wisconsin State Assembly
- Ben Williams, former National Football League defensive end
