= 1994 Hamilton Tiger-Cats season =

Season of Canadian Football League team the Hamilton Tiger-Cats

- Head coach: John Gregory (1-5-0); Don Sutherin - Interim (3-9-0)
- Home stadium: Ivor Wynne Stadium

Results
- Record: 4–14
- Division place: 5th, East
- Playoffs: did not qualify
- Team MOP: Earl Winfield
- Team MOC: Michael O'Shea
- Team MOR: Hassan Bailey

The 1994 Hamilton Tiger-Cats season was the 37th season for the team in the Canadian Football League (CFL) and their 45th overall. The Tiger-Cats finished in fifth place in the East Division with a 4–14 record and failed to make the playoffs.

== Offseason ==
=== CFL draft ===
Rd	Pick	Player	Position	School
Supp.	1	Val St. Germain	OL	McGill
2	16	Jeremy Braitenback	WR	Saskatchewan
3	24	Ainsworth Morgan	WR	Toledo
3	28	Tim Tindale	FB	Western Ontario
4	32	Chris Harris	CB	Simon Fraser
5	38	Micheal Cheevers	LB	Wilfrid Laurier
6	45	Geoff Nichol	LB	Colgate

== Preseason ==
Game	Date	Opponent	Results		Venue	Attendance
Game	Date	Opponent	Score	Record	Venue	Attendance
A	June 22	vs. Toronto Argonauts	L 24–29	0–1	Ivor Wynne Stadium	9,192
B	June 29	at Ottawa Rough Riders	W 28–27	1–1	Frank Clair Stadium	

== Regular season ==
=== Season standings ===
East Division
Pos	Team	Pld	W	L	T	PF	PA	PD	Pts	Div	Stk
1	Winnipeg Blue Bombers (Q)	18	13	5	0	651	572	79	26	9–1	W1
2	Baltimore CFLers (Q)	18	12	6	0	561	431	130	24	8-2	L1
3	Toronto Argonauts (Q)	18	7	11	0	504	578	−74	14	5–5	L2
4	Ottawa Rough Riders (Q)	18	4	14	0	480	647	−167	8	3–7	L7
5	Hamilton Tiger-Cats	18	4	14	0	435	562	−127	8	3–7	L3
6	Shreveport Pirates	18	3	15	0	330	661	−331	6	2–8	W2

Source: "CFL.ca". Archived from the original on 2009-07-15.
(Q) Qualified for playoffs

=== Schedule ===
Week	Date	Opponent	Result	Record
1	July 9	at Edmonton Eskimos	L 11–26	0–1
2	July 14	vs. Sacramento Gold Miners	L 22–25	0–2
3	July 21	at BC Lions	L 25–42	0–3
4	July 28	vs. Ottawa Rough Riders	L 25–53	0–4
5	Aug 5	vs. Shreveport Pirates	W 38–15	1–4
6	Aug 10	at Baltimore CFLers	L 15–30	1–5
7	Aug 20	at Shreveport Pirates	W 30–26	2–5
8	Aug 27	vs. Baltimore CFLers	L 17–28	2–6
9	Sept 5	vs. Toronto Argonauts	L 19–31	2–7
10	Sept 10	at Ottawa Rough Riders	W 28–18	3–7
11	Sept 17	vs. Winnipeg Blue Bombers	L 21–38	3–8
12	Sept 24	at Las Vegas Posse	L 21–25	3–9
13	Oct 2	at Toronto Argonauts	L 36–39	3–10
14	Oct 9	vs. Edmonton Eskimos	L 32–33	3–11
15	Oct 16	vs. Calgary Stampeders	W 27–24	4–11
16	Oct 22	at Winnipeg Blue Bombers	L 44–46	4–12
17	Oct 30	at Calgary Stampeders	L 10–47	4–13
18	Nov 6	vs. Saskatchewan Roughriders	L 14–16	4–14

== Roster ==
1994 Hamilton Tiger-Cats final roster
Quarterbacks: 10 Todd Dillon; 16 Joe Mauldin; 8 Reggie Slack; Running backs: 33 Paul Bushey; 5 Joe Campbell; 12 Dave Dinnall; 22 Brad Elberg; 25 Lee Knight; Receivers: 82 Frank Marof; 83 Kelvin Means; 80 Orlando McKay; 85 Richard Nurse; 1 Earl Winfield; 21 Wally Zatylny	Offensive linemen: 68 Scott Douglas G; 62 Pete Giftopoulos T; 63 Pete Gisborn T; 65 Darrell Harle C/G; 51 David Richardson T; 56 Dale Sanderson C; 57 Val St. Germain G; Defensive linemen: 58 Lou Cafazzo DT; 55 Tim Cofield DE; 50 Marcus Cotton DE; 99 Mike Philbrick DT; 90 Reggie Rogers DT; 96 Jason Simmons DE	Linebackers: 34 Hassan Bailey; 91 Steve McKee; 42 John Motton; 59 Mike O'Shea; 36 Greg Patrick; Defensive backs: 9 Eric Carter; 27 Bobby Dawson; 13 Greg Eaglin; 15 Roger Hennig; 14 Adrion Smith; 20 Gary Wilkerson; 6 Todd Wiseman; Special teams: 3 Paul Osbaldiston K/P	Injured list: 93 Romel Andrews DE; 19 Reggie Barnes RB; 89 Cornell Burbage WR; 17 Ken Evraire SB; 88 Lonzell Hill WR; 28 Don Odegard DB; 90 Herman Smith DE; 7 Terry Wright DB; Italics indicate American players
