= 1994 Toronto Argonauts season =

CFL team season

- General manager: Bob O'Billovich
- Head coach: Bob O'Billovich
- Home stadium: SkyDome

Results
- Record: 7–11
- Division place: 3rd, East
- Playoffs: Lost East Semi-Final

Uniform

The 1994 Toronto Argonauts finished in third place in the East Division with a 7–11 record. The Argos' appeared in the East Semi-Final and lost to the Baltimore CFLers 34–15.

== Regular season ==
=== Standings ===
East Division
Pos	Team	Pld	W	L	T	PF	PA	PD	Pts	Div	Stk
1	Winnipeg Blue Bombers (Q)	18	13	5	0	651	572	79	26	9–1	W1
2	Baltimore CFLers (Q)	18	12	6	0	561	431	130	24	8-2	L1
3	Toronto Argonauts (Q)	18	7	11	0	504	578	−74	14	5–5	L2
4	Ottawa Rough Riders (Q)	18	4	14	0	480	647	−167	8	3–7	L7
5	Hamilton Tiger-Cats	18	4	14	0	435	562	−127	8	3–7	L3
6	Shreveport Pirates	18	3	15	0	330	661	−331	6	2–8	W2

Source: "CFL.ca". Archived from the original on 2009-07-15.
(Q) Qualified for playoffs

=== Schedule ===
Week	Game	Date	Opponent	Results		Venue	Attendance
Week	Game	Date	Opponent	Score	Record	Venue	Attendance
1	1	July 7	vs. Baltimore CFLers	L 20–28	0–1	SkyDome	13,101
2	2	July 16	at Shreveport Pirates	W 35–34	1–1	Independence Stadium	20,634
3	3	July 22	at Saskatchewan Roughriders	L 24–35	1–2	Taylor Field	23,433
4	4	July 29	vs. Las Vegas Posse	W 39–20	2–2	SkyDome	14,296
5	5	Aug 4	vs. Winnipeg Blue Bombers	L 34–54	2–3	SkyDome	13,407
6	6	Aug 11	at BC Lions	L 39–54	2–4	BC Place	19,424
7	7	Aug 20	at Baltimore CFLers	W 31–24	3–4	Memorial Stadium	41,155
8	8	Aug 25	vs. Calgary Stampeders	L 3–52	3–5	SkyDome	19,158
9	9	Sept 5	at Hamilton Tiger-Cats	W 31–19	4–5	Ivor Wynne Stadium	20,687
10	10	Sept 11	vs. BC Lions	L 18–28	4–6	SkyDome	15,259
11	11	Sept 18	vs. Ottawa Rough Riders	L 32–40	4–7	SkyDome	15,102
12	12	Sept 25	at Edmonton Eskimos	L 25–28	4–8	Commonwealth Stadium	24,132
13	13	Oct 2	vs. Hamilton Tiger-Cats	W 39–36	5–8	SkyDome	18,709
14	14	Oct 8	at Sacramento Gold Miners	L 32–34	5–9	Hornet Stadium	13,050
15	15	Oct 16	at Ottawa Rough Riders	W 24–22	6–9	Frank Clair Stadium	21,029
16	16	Oct 23	vs. Edmonton Eskimos	W 23–6	7–9	SkyDome	22,210
17	17	Oct 28	vs. Shreveport Pirates	L 27–29	7–10	SkyDome	20,328
18	18	Nov 6	at Winnipeg Blue Bombers	L 28–35	7–11	Winnipeg Stadium	20,720

== Postseason ==
Round	Date	Opponent	Results		Venue	Attendance
Round	Date	Opponent	Score	Record	Venue	Attendance
East Semi-Final	Sat, Nov 12	at Baltimore CFLers	L 15–34	0–1	Memorial Stadium	35,223

== Roster ==
1994 Toronto Argonauts final roster
Quarterbacks: 7 Marvin Graves; 12 Mike Kerrigan; 11 Erik White; Running backs: 31 Michael Clemons; 34 Duane Forde; 33 Kevin Smellie; Receivers: 87 Darrick Branch; 35 Norm Casola; 79 Rob Crifo; 84 Bob Gordon; 83 Dave Irwin; 88 Paul Masotti; 85 Ainsworth Morgan	Offensive linemen: 63 Francois Belanger T/G; 69 Joe Burgos T; 68 Mike Jovanovich G; 54 Blaine Schmidt C; 67 Chris Schultz T; 59 Pierre Vercheval G; Defensive linemen: 90 Swift Burch DE; 99 Mike Campbell DT; 95 Jeff Fields DT; 75 Carlos Fowler DE; 77 Rodney Harding DE; 44 Leon Hatziioannou DT; Special teams: 15 Wayne Lammle K/P	Linebackers: 37 Keith Castello; 29 Paul Clatney; 36 Don Moen; 39 Tony O'Billovich; 38 Joe Sardo; 73 Calvin Tiggle; Defensive backs: 19 Keita Crespina; 6 Tommy Henry; 21 George Nimako; 2 Reggie Pleasant; 17 Eddie Lee Thomas; 24 Ken Walcott; 4 Kevin Whitley; 13 Taly Williams	Injured list: 71 Eric Blount LB; 25 Hency Charles DB; 57 Carl Coulter C; 18 Jeff Fairholm SB; 65 Trace Laing DT; Italics indicate International player
