= Pattison, Mississippi =

- Census-designated place
- Location within Mississippi Location within the United States
- Coordinates: 31°53′19″N 90°53′14″W
- Country: United States
- State: Mississippi
- County: Claiborne

Area
  - Total: 1.11 sq mi (2.88 km^{2})
  - Land: 1.11 sq mi (2.88 km^{2})
  - Water: 0 sq mi (0.00 km^{2})
- Elevation: 203 ft (62 m)

Population (2020)
  - Total: 176
  - Density: 158.1/sq mi (61.05/km^{2})
- Time zone: UTC-6 (Central (CST))
  - Summer (DST): UTC-5 (CDT)
- ZIP code: 39144
- Area codes: 601 & 769
- GNIS feature ID: 675501

Pattison, also known as Martin, is a census-designated place and unincorporated community in Claiborne County, Mississippi, United States. Its ZIP code is 39144.

Per the 2020 Census, the population was 176.

== History ==
Pattison was originally named Martin in honor of General William T. Martin. Pattison is located on the former Yazoo and Mississippi Valley Railroad and was once home to a drug store, grist mill, cotton gin, saloon, hotel, and multiple general stores.

A post office operated under the name Martin from 1879 to 1912 and first began operation under the name Pattison in 1912.

== Demographics ==
Historical population
Census	Pop.	Note	%±
2020	176		—
U.S. Decennial Census; 2020

Pattison was first listed as a census designated place in the 2020 U.S. census.

=== 2020 census ===
Pattison CDP, Mississippi – Racial and ethnic composition Note: the US Census treats Hispanic/Latino as an ethnic category. This table excludes Latinos from the racial categories and assigns them to a separate category. Hispanics/Latinos may be of any race.
Race / Ethnicity (NH = Non-Hispanic)	Pop 2020	% 2020
White alone (NH)	6	3.41%
Black or African American alone (NH)	157	89.20%
Native American or Alaska Native alone (NH)	0	0.00%
Asian alone (NH)	0	0.00%
Pacific Islander alone (NH)	0	0.00%
Some Other Race alone (NH)	0	0.00%
Mixed Race or Multi-Racial (NH)	10	5.68%
Hispanic or Latino (any race)	3	1.70%
Total	176	100.00%

== Education ==
Residents are zoned to the Claiborne County School District. Port Gibson High School is the comprehensive high school of the district.

== Notable person ==
- Bennie Goods, former Canadian Football League defensive tackle, was born in Pattison.
