= 1994 Ottawa Rough Riders season =

Canadian football team season

- Head coach: Adam Rita
- Home stadium: Frank Clair Stadium

Results
- Record: 4–14
- Division place: 4th, East
- Playoffs: Lost East Semi-Final

Uniform

The 1994 Ottawa Rough Riders finished fourth place in the East Division with a 4–14 record. They were defeated in the East Semi-Final by the Winnipeg Blue Bombers.

== Offseason ==
=== CFL draft ===
Rd	Pick	Player	Position	School
1	5	Tony Bailey	DE	St. Mary's
1	7	Rod Murphy	LB	Idaho State
2	15	Mike Malott	RB	Waterloo
3	23	Glenn McCausland	WR	Toronto
4	31	Obie Spanic	DT	Weber State

=== Preseason ===
Game	Date	Opponent	Results		Venue
Game	Date	Opponent	Score	Record	Venue
A	June 24	at Winnipeg Blue Bombers	L 28–61	0–1	Winnipeg Stadium
B	June 29	vs. Hamilton Tiger-Cats	L 27–28	0–2	Frank Clair Stadium

== Regular season ==
=== Season standings ===
East Division
Pos	Team	Pld	W	L	T	PF	PA	PD	Pts	Div	Stk
1	Winnipeg Blue Bombers (Q)	18	13	5	0	651	572	79	26	9–1	W1
2	Baltimore CFLers (Q)	18	12	6	0	561	431	130	24	8-2	L1
3	Toronto Argonauts (Q)	18	7	11	0	504	578	−74	14	5–5	L2
4	Ottawa Rough Riders (Q)	18	4	14	0	480	647	−167	8	3–7	L7
5	Hamilton Tiger-Cats	18	4	14	0	435	562	−127	8	3–7	L3
6	Shreveport Pirates	18	3	15	0	330	661	−331	6	2–8	W2

Source: "CFL.ca". Archived from the original on 2009-07-15.
(Q) Qualified for playoffs

== Regular season ==
=== Schedule ===
Week	Date	Opponent	Result	Record	Attendance
1	July 6	vs. Shreveport Pirates	W 40–10	1–0	18,134
2	July 15	vs. BC Lions	L 18–57	1–1	20,069
3	July 20	at Edmonton Eskimos	L 21–23	1–2	27,188
4	July 28	at Hamilton Tiger-Cats	W 53–25	2–2	12,339
5	Aug 3	vs. Calgary Stampeders	L 27–30	2–3	17,163
6	Aug 11	vs. Winnipeg Blue Bombers	L 41–59	2–4	19,173
7	Aug 17	at Winnipeg Blue Bombers	L 1–46	2–5	21,308
8	Aug 26	at Saskatchewan Roughriders	L 19–35	2–6	21,738
9	Sept 3	vs. Las Vegas Posse	W 54–50	3–6	17,732
10	Sept 10	vs. Hamilton Tiger-Cats	L 18–28	3–7	17,321
11	Sept 18	at Toronto Argonauts	W 40–32	4–7	15,102
12	Sept 25	vs. Baltimore CFLers	L 27–42	4–8	20,764
13	Oct 1	at Baltimore CFLers	L 13–40	4–9	36,187
14	Oct 10	at Calgary Stampeders	L 24–28	4–10	22,615
15	Oct 16	vs. Toronto Argonauts	L 22–24	4–11	21,029
16	Oct 22	at Sacramento Gold Miners	L 9–44	4–12	13,760
17	Oct 29	vs. Saskatchewan Roughriders	L 29–46	4–13	23,292
18	Nov 4	at Shreveport Pirates	L 24–28	4–14	32,011

== Postseason ==
Round	Date	Opponent	Results		Venue	Attendance
Round	Date	Opponent	Score	Record	Venue	Attendance
East Semi-final	Sun, Nov 13	at Winnipeg Blue Bombers	L 16–26	4–15	Winnipeg Stadium	18,888

== Roster ==
1994 Ottawa Rough Riders final roster
Quarterbacks: 8 Danny Barrett; 14 Marquel Fleetwood; 9 Don McPherson; Running backs: 25 Gerry Collins; 35 Dean Noel; 32 Mike Richardson; Receivers: 2 Horace Brooks DB; 81 Jock Climie; 85 James Ellingson; 89 Stephen Jones; 83 Andy Martin; 82 Nick Mazzoli; 80 Andrew Murray; 4 Fred Ward	Offensive linemen: 64 Bruce Beaton G; 54 Irv Daymond C; 58 Chris Gioskos G; 57 Mike Graybill T; 66 Jim Mills T; 59 James Monroe C/G; Defensive linemen: 48 Daved Benefield DE; 73 John Kropke DT; 68 Glenn Kulka DE; 74 Derek MacCready DT; 73 Kent Rowe DE; 99 Paul Yatkowski DT	Linebackers: 32 Greg Battle; 34 Mark Scott; 50 Jessie Small; 49 Alfred Smith; 35 Pat Wayne; Defensive backs: 1 Andre Francis; 21 Garry Lewis; 7 Manny Martin; 6 Andrew Thomas; 24 Remi Trudel; 23 Brett Young; Special teams: 10 Terry Baker K/P	Injured list: 61 Nick Benjamin G; 90 Brian Bonner LB; 38 Patrick Burke DB; 88 Keith Jack SB; 20 Darren Joseph RB; 56 Steve Krupey G; 63 Michel Raby DT; 43 Gord Weber LB; 65 Ken Whitney T; Italics indicate International player

== Awards and honours ==
=== 1994 CFL All-Stars ===
- None

=== Eastern All-Stars ===
- DE – John Kropke, CFL Eastern All-Star
- LB – Daved Benefield, CFL Eastern All-Star
