= Bennie Goods =

American gridiron football player (born 1968)

No. 40
- Position: Defensive tackle

Personal information
- Born: February 28, 1968 (age 58); Pattison, Mississippi

Career information
- College: Alcorn State

Career history
- 1990–1998: Edmonton Eskimos
- 1999–2000: Winnipeg Blue Bombers
- 2001–2002: Detroit Fury

Awards and highlights
- Grey Cup champion (1993); 3× CFL All-Star (1994, 1995, 1996); 2× CFL West All-Star (1994, 1996)

Bennie Goods (born February 28, 1968) is a US-born former Canadian Football League defensive tackle.

Goods was born in Pattison, Mississippi, and played eleven seasons for two different teams. Goods also played in the Arena Football League for the Detroit Fury.
