= Humphreys County High School =

High school in Mississippi, United States

Location
- 700 Cohn Street; Belzoni, (Humphreys County), Mississippi 39038; United States
- 33.1856°N 90.4848°W

Information
- Type: Public high school
- Principal: Janina Tanner
- Staff: 29.51 (FTE)
- Enrollment: 430 (2023-2024)
- Student to teacher ratio: 14.57
- Colors: Blue and white
- Mascot: Cowboys
- Website: www.humphreys.k12.ms.us/o/hchs

Humphreys County High School (HCHS) is a public senior high school in Belzoni, Mississippi, United States and a part of the Humphreys County School District.

The attendance boundary of the school district, and therefore the school's attendance boundary, is all of Humphreys County.

== History ==
After the school integrated racially (sometime around 1970), black students had protested against verbal abuse used against black students by the principal, a white person; white teachers giving failing grades to black students; and the calling of black students "nigger" and "nigra".

== See also ==
- Humphreys Academy, the area private school
