= 1994 Shreveport Pirates season =

- Owner: Bernard Glieberman and Lonnie Glieberman
- General manager: J. I. Albrecht
- Head coach: John Huard (released during training camp), Forrest Gregg
- Home stadium: Independence Stadium

Results
- Record: 3–15
- Division place: 6th, East
- Playoffs: did not qualify

Uniform
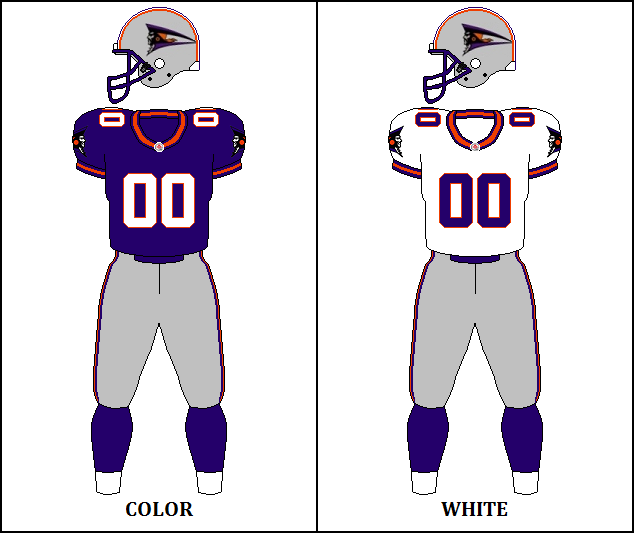

The 1994 Shreveport Pirates season was the first season in the teams franchise history. They finished last place in the East division with a 3–15 record and failed to make the playoffs.

== Offseason ==
During the 1993 season, Bernie Glieberman was the owner of the Ottawa Rough Riders franchise. The city refused to renegotiate the terms of the lease for Frank Clair Stadium and Glieberman threatened to move the franchise. Instead, Glieberman sold the franchise to local businessman Bruce Firestone. Glieberman was offered the opportunity to start a new franchise and the Shreveport Pirates were born. His son Lonie was named team president and the Gliebermans were leased Independence Stadium at a 10-year lease for $2,500 a game. Lonie Glieberman boasted that the Pirates would be the first US based CFL franchise to win the Grey Cup.

=== Training camp ===
The Pirates first training camp was meant to be on the grounds at Louisiana State University. Instead, there was a scheduling error and the Pirates were forced to hold their training camp on the grounds of the Louisiana State Fair. The players were housed in a large barracks style room that housed 12 to 18 players, and were on the second level, while animals were on the first level. Pirates player Joe Mero would book a nearby hotel room at his own expense. Head coach John Huard was the former football coach at the Maine Maritime Academy and he would be fired during training camp. An incident occurred where Huard berated a volunteer athletic therapist. The therapist left training camp and Huard was released from his coaching duties. Huard was replaced by NFL Hall of Famer and former Cincinnati Bengals and Toronto Argonauts head coach Forrest Gregg. Gregg convinced the Gliebermans to remove the Vice President of Operations and the General Manager.

== Preseason ==
Game	Date	Opponent	Results		Venue	Attendance
Game	Date	Opponent	Score	Record	Venue	Attendance
A	Fri, June 24	vs. Baltimore CFLers	L 18–33	0–1	Independence Stadium	19,000
B	Tue, June 28	at Toronto Argonauts	L 1–24	0–2	Skydome	12,712

== Regular season ==
Despite the losing, Shreveport averaged a respectable attendance of 17,871 fans per game. The Pirates set a CFL record with the longest losing streak in history (14 consecutive losses). This abysmal record stood for 32 years until the Ottawa Redblacks broke it with their 15th consecutive loss during their 2026 season.

East Division
Pos	Team	Pld	W	L	T	PF	PA	PD	Pts	Div	Stk
1	Winnipeg Blue Bombers (Q)	18	13	5	0	651	572	79	26	9–1	W1
2	Baltimore CFLers (Q)	18	12	6	0	561	431	130	24	8-2	L1
3	Toronto Argonauts (Q)	18	7	11	0	504	578	−74	14	5–5	L2
4	Ottawa Rough Riders (Q)	18	4	14	0	480	647	−167	8	3–7	L7
5	Hamilton Tiger-Cats	18	4	14	0	435	562	−127	8	3–7	L3
6	Shreveport Pirates	18	3	15	0	330	661	−331	6	2–8	W2

Source: "CFL.ca". Archived from the original on July 15, 2009.
(Q) Qualified for playoffs

.

=== Schedule ===
Week	Game	Date	Opponent	Results		Venue	Attendance
Week	Game	Date	Opponent	Score	Record	Venue	Attendance
1	1	Wed, July 6	at Ottawa Rough Riders	L 10–40	0–1	Frank Clair Stadium	18,134
2	2	Sat, July 16	vs. Toronto Argonauts	L 34–35	0–2	Independence Stadium	20,634
3	3	Sat, July 23	at Baltimore CFLers	L 24–40	0–3	Memorial Stadium	31,172
4	4	Sat, July 30	vs. Edmonton Eskimos	L 10–24	0–4	Independence Stadium	17,434
5	5	Fri, Aug 5	at Hamilton Tiger-Cats	L 15–38	0–5	Ivor Wynne Stadium	12,612
6	6	Sat, Aug 13	vs. Las Vegas Posse	L 13–49	0–6	Independence Stadium	18,011
7	7	Sat, Aug 20	vs. Hamilton Tiger-Cats	L 26–30	0–7	Independence Stadium	14,364
8	8	Sat, Aug 27	at BC Lions	L 15–67	0–8	BC Place	20,398
9	9	Sat, Sept 3	vs. Baltimore CFLers	L 16–28	0–9	Independence Stadium	16,332
10	10	Sat, Sept 10	at Las Vegas Posse	L 21–34	0–10	Sam Boyd Stadium	9467
11	11	Sat, Sept 17	at Sacramento Gold Miners	L 3–56	0–11	Hornet Stadium	13,747
12	12	Sat, Sept 24	vs. Saskatchewan Roughriders	L 11–29	0–12	Independence Stadium	15,502
13	13	Sat, Oct 1	at Winnipeg Blue Bombers	L 21–39	0–13	Winnipeg Stadium	20,426
14	14	Sat, Oct 8	vs. Winnipeg Blue Bombers	L 22–38	0–14	Independence Stadium	14,088
15	15	Sun, Oct 16	vs. Sacramento Gold Miners	W 24–12	1–14	Independence Stadium	12,465
16	16	Fri, Oct 21	at Calgary Stampeders	L 8–52	1–15	McMahon Stadium	21,317
17	17	Fri, Oct 28	at Toronto Argonauts	W 29–27	2–15	Skydome	20,328
18	18	Fri, Nov 4	vs. Ottawa Rough Riders	W 28–24	3–15	Independence Stadium	32,011

== Roster ==
1994 Shreveport Pirates final roster
Quarterbacks: 12 Robert Cobb; 1 Robert Hall; 10 Mike Johnson; Running backs: 2 Ryan Benjamin; 20 Butch Hadnot; 5 Martin Patton; 22 Derrick Witherspoon; Receivers: 17 Greg Ballard; 84 Lloyd Hill; 82 David Lucas; 88 Terry Smith; 6 Charles Thompson; 80 Wayne Walker; Special teams: 3 Aaron Kanner P; 16 Björn Nittmo K	Offensive linemen: 66 Terry Beauford G; 69 Freddie Childress T; 65 Jon Heidenreich T; 68 Donnell Johnson T; 57 Steve McAdoo T; 60 Uzooma Okeke G; 58 Chuck Reed G; 59 William Scott C; 62 Mike Stowell C; 56 Rob Wallow G; Defensive linemen: 53 Keith Browner DT; 99 Alex Mash DE; 77 Reggie Rogers DT; 96 Ray Savage DE; 72 Johnny Scott DT; 95 Greg Stumon DE; 64 Ben Willaims DT	Linebackers: 35 Paschall Davis; 15 Brian Hilk; 46 Eldonta Osborne; 36 Mario Perry; 34 Ron Perry; 44 Steve Solari; Defensive backs: 8 Cliff Baskerville; 31 Don Caparotti; 43 William Evers; 14 Corris Ervin; 24 Joe Fuller; 27 Daniel Hunter; 32 Carlton Johnson; 18 Joe Mero; 37 Harold Nash; 23 Anthony Shelton; 33 Jonathan Wilson; 25 Antoine Worthman; Italics indicate American player

== Awards and honors ==
- Ben Williams, Defensive Tackle, CFL Eastern All-Star
- Joe Fuller, Defensive Back, CFL Eastern All-Star
