= Shar Pourdanesh =

American football player (born 1970)

No. 67, 68
- Position: Offensive tackle

Personal information
- Born: July 19, 1970 (age 56); Tehran, Iran
- Listed height: 6 ft 6 in (1.98 m)
- Listed weight: 312 lb (142 kg)

Career information
- High school: University (Irvine, California, U.S.)
- College: Nevada

Career history
- 1993: Cleveland Browns*
- 1994–1995: Baltimore Stallions
- 1996–1998: Washington Redskins
- 1999–2000: Pittsburgh Steelers
- 2001: Oakland Raiders
- * Offseason or practice squad member only

Awards and highlights
- Grey Cup champion (1995); Leo Dandurand Trophy (1994); CFL All-Star (1994); CFL East All-Star (1994)
- Stats at Pro Football Reference

Shahriar Pourdanesh (born July 19, 1970) is a former American football offensive lineman who played in the National Football League (NFL) for the Washington Redskins, Pittsburgh Steelers, and Oakland Raiders from 1996 to 2001 when in 2001 a severe knee injury cut his career short.

He is distinguished as being the first Iranian to play in the National Football League (NFL).

== Early life ==
Pourdanesh was born on July 19, 1970 in Tehran, but left at age 9 for Germany, while trying to gain entry to the United States. They gained this permission in 1983.

Pourdanesh is a graduate of University High School in Irvine, California.

Pourdanesh was an All-American offensive tackle at the University of Nevada, Reno in 1992 he earned first-team All-Big west Conference honors and received Nevada's Most Outstanding Offensive Player award. He also served as team captain twice. He was an integral part and leader of one of the nation's top offenses during that span, and helped lead the Wolfpack to three conference titles and a spot in the 1990 1AA National Title game. He was inducted into the Nevada athletic Hall of Fame in 2005.

== Professional career ==
He previously played with the Baltimore Stallions of the Canadian Football League from 1994 to 1995, where he was an All-Star and won the CFL's Most Outstanding Offensive Lineman Award in 1994 (the first ever rookie to be honored so), and was a member of the Grey Cup Championship team in 1995. He was also signed to a one-year deal with the Cleveland Browns in 1993 under coach Bill Belichick. He played for the Washington Redskins before being traded to Pittsburgh in August 1999 for a conditional seventh-round selection in the 2000 draft. He is the only Iranian-born football player in NFL history and has over 80 professional starts in his career.

== Personal life ==
Shar and his family escaped the Iranian Revolution in 1979 and fled to Europe. The Pourdanesh family settled in Irvine, California in 1983 after spending 3 years in West Germany.
