= Michael Brooks (defensive back) =

American gridiron football player (born 1967)

No. 32, 44, 17, 11
- Position: Safety

Personal information
- Born: March 12, 1967 (age 59); Greensboro, North Carolina, U.S.
- Listed height: 6 ft 0 in (1.83 m)
- Listed weight: 195 lb (88 kg)

Career information
- High school: Walter H. Page (Greensboro)
- College: NC State
- NFL draft: 1989: undrafted

Career history
- San Diego Chargers (1989–1990); Dallas Cowboys (1990–1991); Denver Broncos (1993)*; Baltimore Stallions (1994); Memphis Mad Dogs (1995)
- * Offseason or practice squad member only

Awards and highlights
- 2× Track All-American (1987, 1988); Second-team All-ACC (1988); CFL East All-Star (1994)

Career NFL statistics
- Games played: 5
- Stats at Pro Football Reference

Michael Antonio Brooks (born March 12, 1967) is an American former professional football player who was a safety in the National Football League (NFL) for the San Diego Chargers and Dallas Cowboys. He played college football for the NC State Wolfpack. He also was a member of the Baltimore CFLers and Memphis Mad Dogs in the Canadian Football League (CFL).

== Early life ==
Brooks attended Walter Hines Page High School, where he was an All-State linebacker and running back. He was a teammate of future NFL players Haywood Jeffires and Todd Ellis, while helping his team win three straight state championships.

He won the 100-meter dash state championship as a senior.

== College career ==
Brooks accepted a football scholarship from North Carolina State University. He was an outside linebacker as a freshman. The next year, he was moved to free safety and became a starter.

As a junior, he registered 105 tackles (led the team) and at the time tied for second best in school history with 14 passes defensed. He had 10 tackles against the University of South Carolina.

As a senior, he posted 82 tackles (second on the team), 2 interceptions and 7 passes defensed. In the 1988 Peach Bowl, he received defensive MVP honors after making a bowl record 3 interceptions (he also had 8 passes defensed) and helping N.C. State win 28-23. He finished his college career with 277 tackles, 8 interceptions, 4 forced fumbles, 2 fumble recoveries and 30 passes defensed (tied for second in school history).

He also was an All-American sprinter, helping the school win three straight ACC outdoor track titles.

== Professional career ==
=== San Diego Chargers ===
Brooks was signed as an undrafted free agent by the San Diego Chargers after the 1989 NFL draft in May. He was waived on September 3 and signed to the practice squad, where he spent the first 14 weeks of the season, before being promoted to the active roster for the last 2 contests. He only played in the season finale against the Denver Broncos.

He was released on September 3, 1990. On September 26, 1990, he was re-signed for depth purposes because of injuries. He was released on October 11.

=== Dallas Cowboys ===
On November 7, 1990, he was signed to the Dallas Cowboys practice squad. On December 10, he was promoted to active roster to play because of injuries, posting 2 special teams tackles. On August 20, 1991, he was placed on the injured reserve list after tearing his left anterior cruciate ligament.

=== Denver Broncos ===
In 1993, he was signed as a free agent by the Denver Broncos. He was cut on August 24.

=== Baltimore CFLers ===
On May 21, 1994, he signed with the Baltimore CFLers of the Canadian Football League. He was a part of the franchise's inaugural season, while helping his team reach the Grey Cup (first American-based CFL team to achieve this goal) and receiving Eastern All-Star honors. He was released in June 1995.

=== Memphis Mad Dogs ===
On July 31, 1995, he signed with the Memphis Mad Dogs of the Canadian Football League. He originally was placed on the practice roster, but later played in three regular season games. His main role was on the special teams, where he made seven tackles. On September 16, he was released after refusing to accept a new contract with a reduced salary.
