= Gerald Wilcox =

Canadian football player (born 1966)

No. 87
- Position: Slotback

Personal information
- Born: July 8, 1966 (age 60); London, Ontario, Canada

Career information
- College: Weber State
- CFL draft: 1989: 1st round, 1st overall pick

Career history
- 1989–1991: Ottawa Rough Riders
- 1992–1996: Winnipeg Blue Bombers
- 1997: Calgary Stampeders

Awards and highlights
- CFL's Most Outstanding Canadian Award (1994); CFL All-Star (1994); 2× CFL East All-Star (1993, 1994); CFL record 111 receptions by a Canadian in a single-season (1994)

Gerald Wilcox (born July 8, 1966) is a former slotback who played nine seasons in the Canadian Football League for three teams. Wilcox was the winner of the CFL's Most Outstanding Canadian Award in 1994 while playing for the Winnipeg Blue Bombers and also was a CFL All-Star that season.

== Basketball Executive ==
On November 10, 1995, Wilcox was named Commissioner of the International Basketball Association.
