= Humphreys County School District =

School district in Mississippi

The Humphreys County School District is a public school district with its administrative offices in Belzoni, Mississippi (USA). The district's boundaries parallel that of Humphreys County.

== History ==
In 2019, the state Board of Education voted to take over the Humphreys County School District, as well as the Yazoo City School District, and incorporated them into a new statewide "achievement district"; the move came after the school districts were rated as chronically underperforming in terms of student academic achievement.

== Schools ==
- Humphreys County High School
- Humphreys County Vocational Tech.
- Humphreys Junior High School
- O. M. McNair Upper Elementary School
- Ida Greene Lower Elementary School

== Demographics ==
=== 2006-07 school year ===
There were a total of 1,840 students enrolled in the Humphreys County School District during the 2006–2007 school year. The gender makeup of the district was 50% female and 50% male. The racial makeup of the district was 96.74% African American, 1.79% White, 1.41% Hispanic, and 0.05% Native American. 94.2% of the district's students were eligible to receive free lunch.

=== Previous school years ===
School Year	Enrollment	Gender Makeup		Racial Makeup				
School Year	Enrollment	Female	Male	Asian	African American	Hispanic	Native American	White
2005-06	1,845	50%	50%	–	96.96%	1.19%	0.05%	1.79%
2004-05	1,885	49%	51%	–	97.72%	0.42%	0.05%	1.80%
2003-04	1,918	49%	51%	–	97.24%	0.26%	–	2.50%
2002-03	2,032	50%	50%	–	97.44%	0.25%	–	2.31%

== Accountability statistics ==
	2006-07	2005-06	2004-05	2003-04	2002-03
District Accreditation Status	Accredited	Accredited	Accredited	Accredited	Accredited
School Performance Classifications
Level 5 (Superior Performing) Schools	0	0	0	0	0
Level 4 (Exemplary) Schools	1	1	0	0	0
Level 3 (Successful) Schools	0	1	2	4	0
Level 2 (Under Performing) Schools	2	2	2	0	2
Level 1 (Low Performing) Schools	1	0	0	0	1
Not Assigned	0	0	0	0	0

== See also ==
- List of school districts in Mississippi
