= Mike Anderson (offensive lineman) =

Canadian gridiron football player (born 1961)

Profile
- Position: Centre

Personal information
- Born: August 15, 1961 (age 65); Regina, Saskatchewan, Canada

Career information
- High school: Evan Hardy Collegiate
- College: San Diego State

Career history
- 1984–1995: Saskatchewan Roughriders

Awards and highlights
- Grey Cup champion (1989); CFL All-Star (1994); 2× CFL West All-Star (1988, 1994)

Mike Anderson (born August 15, 1961) is a Canadian former professional football offensive lineman who played 12 seasons in the Canadian Football League (CFL) for the Saskatchewan Roughriders. He was selected by the Roughriders as a territorial exemption to the draft. He was named CFL All-Star in the 1994 CFL season, a year after he was released due to salary cap reduction, but then later re-signed.
