= Nick Subis =

American football player (born 1967)

No. 60, 69, 51
- Positions: Tackle, center

Personal information
- Born: December 24, 1967 (age 58); Inglewood, California, U.S.
- Listed height: 6 ft 4 in (1.93 m)
- Listed weight: 278 lb (126 kg)

Career information
- High school: Torrance (CA) West
- College: San Diego State
- NFL draft: 1991: 6th round, 142nd overall pick

Career history
- Denver Broncos (1991); Los Angeles Rams (1993)*; Sacramento Gold Miners (1993); Baltimore Stallions (1994–1995); Montreal Alouettes (1996)
- * Offseason or practice squad member only

Awards and highlights
- Grey Cup champion (1995); First-team All-WAC (1990)

Career NFL statistics
- Games played: 16
- Stats at Pro Football Reference

Nicholas Alexander Subis (born December 24, 1967) is an American former professional football player who was a tackle and center in the National Football League (NFL) and Canadian Football League (CFL). He played college football for the San Diego State Aztecs. Subis played in the NFL for the Denver Broncos in 1991, and in the CFL for the Sacramento Gold Miners in 1993, Baltimore Stallions from 1994 to 1995 and for Montreal Alouettes in 1996. He was selected by the Broncos in the sixth round of the 1991 NFL draft.
