= Ron Goetz =

American gridiron football player (born 1968)

Profile
- Position: Linebacker

Personal information
- Born: February 8, 1968 (age 58)
- Listed height: 6 ft 3 in (1.91 m)
- Listed weight: 236 lb (107 kg)

Career information
- High school: Waconia High School (Waconia, Minnesota)
- College: Minnesota
- NFL draft: 1990: 12th round, 324th overall pick

Career history
- 1990: Minnesota Vikings*
- 1991: Philadelphia Eagles*
- 1991–1992: Barcelona Dragons
- 1992: Kansas City Chiefs*
- 1993: Ottawa Rough Riders
- 1994–1997: Saskatchewan Roughriders
- * Offseason or practice squad member only

Awards and highlights
- CFL All-Star (1994); Second team All-WLAF (1991)

Career CFL statistics
- Tackles: 290
- Sacks: 21
- Interceptions: 6

Ron Goetz (born February 8, 1968) is a former gridiron football linebacker who played in the Canadian Football League (CFL) and the World League of American Football (WLAF). He played college football at Minnesota.

== College career ==
Goetz played was a member of the Minnesota Golden Gophers for four season. He played fullback as a freshman before moving to linebacker. He moved to middle linebacker going into his senior year and was named honorable mention All-Big Tean after finishing third on the team with 68 tackles, five passes broken up and a fumble recovery.

== Professional career ==
Goetz was selected by the Minnesota Vikings in the 12th round of the 1990 NFL draft. He was signed by the Barcelona Dragons in 1991 and spent two seasons with the team. He was named second team All-WLAF in his first year after making 50 tackles with four interceptions and three fumble recoveries.

In 1993, Goetz was signed by the Ottawa Rough Riders. He was traded to the Saskatchewan Roughriders before the 1994 season. In his first season with the team he finished second in the league with 117 tackles, seven sacks and four interceptions and was named All-CFL. Goetz played four seasons for Saskatchewan before retiring in 1997.

== Personal life ==
Goetz is the uncle of former Minnesota and current NFL tight end Maxx Williams.
