= 1994 Winnipeg Blue Bombers season =

Canadian football team season

- General manager: Cal Murphy
- Head coach: Cal Murphy
- Home stadium: Winnipeg Stadium

Results
- Record: 13–5
- Division place: 1st, East
- Playoffs: Lost East Final

The 1994 Winnipeg Blue Bombers finished in first place in the East Division with a 13–5 record. They attempted to make a third straight Grey Cup appearance, but they lost to Baltimore in the East Final.

== Offseason ==
=== CFL draft ===
| Round | Pick | Player | Position | School |

== Preseason ==
| Game | Date | Opponent | Results | | Venue | Attendance |
| Game | Date | Opponent | Score | Record | Venue | Attendance |
|---|---|---|---|---|---|---|
| A | Fri, June 24 | vs. Ottawa Rough Riders | W 61–28 | 1–0 | Winnipeg Stadium | |
| B | Wed, June 29 | at Baltimore CFLers | L 43–45 | 1–1 | Memorial Stadium | 28,798 |

== Regular season ==
=== Season standings ===
East Division
| Pos | Team | Pld | W | L | T | PF | PA | PD | Pts | Div | Stk |
|---|---|---|---|---|---|---|---|---|---|---|---|
| 1 | Winnipeg Blue Bombers (Q) | 18 | 13 | 5 | 0 | 651 | 572 | 79 | 26 | 9–1 | W1 |
| 2 | Baltimore CFLers (Q) | 18 | 12 | 6 | 0 | 561 | 431 | 130 | 24 | 8-2 | L1 |
| 3 | Toronto Argonauts (Q) | 18 | 7 | 11 | 0 | 504 | 578 | −74 | 14 | 5–5 | L2 |
| 4 | Ottawa Rough Riders (Q) | 18 | 4 | 14 | 0 | 480 | 647 | −167 | 8 | 3–7 | L7 |
| 5 | Hamilton Tiger-Cats | 18 | 4 | 14 | 0 | 435 | 562 | −127 | 8 | 3–7 | L3 |
| 6 | Shreveport Pirates | 18 | 3 | 15 | 0 | 330 | 661 | −331 | 6 | 2–8 | W2 |

Source: "CFL.ca". Archived from the original on 2009-07-15.
(Q) Qualified for playoffs

=== Season schedule ===
| Week | Date | Opponent | Result | Record |
|---|---|---|---|---|
| 1 | July 8 | at BC Lions | L 20–24 | 0–1 |
| 2 | July 14 | vs. Edmonton Eskimos | W 50–35 | 1–1 |
| 3 | July 23 | at Calgary Stampeders | 19–58 | 1–2 |
| 4 | July 28 | vs. Baltimore CFLers | W 39–32 | 2–2 |
| 5 | Aug 4 | at Toronto Argonauts | W 54–34 | 3–2 |
| 6 | Aug 11 | at Ottawa Rough Riders | W 59–41 | 4–2 |
| 7 | Aug 17 | vs. Ottawa Rough Riders | W 46–1 | 5–2 |
| 8 | Aug 24 | vs. Sacramento Gold Miners | W 31–28 | 6–2 |
| 9 | Sept 4 | at Saskatchewan Roughriders | L 31–42 | 6–3 |
| 10 | Sept 11 | vs. Saskatchewan Roughriders | L 18–49 | 6–4 |
| 11 | Sept 17 | at Hamilton Tiger-Cats | W 38–21 | 7–4 |
| 12 | Sept 23 | vs. BC Lions | W 30–18 | 8–4 |
| 13 | Oct 1 | vs. Shreveport Pirates | W 39–21 | 9–4 |
| 14 | Oct 8 | at Shreveport Pirates | W 38–22 | 10–4 |
| 15 | Oct 15 | at Las Vegas Posse | W 48–17 | 11–4 |
| 16 | Oct 22 | vs. Hamilton Tiger-Cats | W 46–44 | 12–4 |
| 17 | Oct 29 | at Baltimore CFLers | L 10–57 | 12–5 |
| 18 | Nov 6 | vs. Toronto Argonauts | W 35–28 | 13–5 |

== Playoffs ==
=== East Semi-Final ===
| Team | Q1 | Q2 | Q3 | Q4 | Total |
|---|---|---|---|---|---|
| Ottawa Rough Riders | 0 | 9 | 0 | 7 | 16 |
| Winnipeg Blue Bombers | 11 | 3 | 6 | 6 | 26 |

=== East Final ===
| Team | Q1 | Q2 | Q3 | Q4 | Total |
|---|---|---|---|---|---|
| Baltimore CFLers | 8 | 0 | 0 | 6 | 14 |
| Winnipeg Blue Bombers | 0 | 8 | 4 | 0 | 12 |

== Roster ==
1994 Winnipeg Blue Bombers final roster
| Quarterbacks: 16 Matt Dunigan; 10 Keithen McCant; 8 Tom Porras; Running backs: 25 Chris Johnstone; 32 Matt Pearce; 23 Keith Woodside; Receivers: 86 Gerald Alphin; 17 Allan Boyko; 1 Jamie Holland; 5 Alfred Jackson; 87 Gerald Wilcox | Offensive linemen: 68 Freddie Childress G/T; 64 Miles Gorrell T; 53 Ed Kucy G; 43 Kevin Robson C; 67 Jim Smyrl G; 60 Dave Vankoughnett C; 63 Chris Walby T; Defensive linemen: 69 Rob Davidson NT; 94 Tony Hill DE; 99 Bill McCollins DE; 77 Stan Mikawos NT; 90 Keilly Rush DE; Special teams: 6 Bob Cameron P; 74 Troy Westwood K | Linebackers: 58 Greg Clark; 4 Reggie Givens; 56 Del Lyles; 36 Paul Randolph; 35 Brendan Rogers; 92 Chris Tsangaris; Defensive backs: 3 Errol Brown; 22 Ken Burress; 7 Ryan Carey; 20 Jayson Dzikowicz; 33 Bobby Evans; 29 Lawrence Hatch; 30 Darryl Sampson; 19 Donald Smith; 27 Norris Thomas | Injured list: 51 David Black G/T; 21 Blaise Bryant RB; 31 Charlie Clemons LB; 81 Tim Daniel WR; 9 Sammy Garza QB; 59 Jeff Grays LB; 76 Loyd Lewis DE; 57 Brett MacNeil G; 26 Kim Phillips DB; 37 Kelvin Smith LB; 39 Alan Wetmore FB; 2 David Williams WR; Italics indicate International player |

== Awards and records ==
- CFL's Most Outstanding Canadian Award – Gerald Wilcox (SB)

=== 1994 CFL All-Stars ===
- SB – Gerald Wilcox, CFL All-Star
- OT – Chris Walby, CFL All-Star
