= 1993 Calgary Stampeders season =

Canadian football team season

- Owner: Larry Ryckman
- General manager: Wally Buono
- Head coach: Wally Buono
- Home stadium: McMahon Stadium

Results
- Record: 15–3
- Division place: 1st, West
- Playoffs: Lost West Final

The 1993 Calgary Stampeders finished in first place in the West Division with a 15–3 record. They attempted to defend their Grey Cup championship in front of a home crowd at McMahon Stadium, but they lost in the West Final to the eventual Grey Cup champions Edmonton Eskimos.

== Offseason ==
=== CFL draft ===
Round	Pick	Player	Position	School

== Preseason ==
Game	Date	Opponent	Results		Venue	Attendance
Game	Date	Opponent	Score	Record	Venue	Attendance
A	Fri, June 18	vs. Saskatchewan Roughriders	W 21–11	1–0	McMahon Stadium	29,280
B	Fri, June 25	at Edmonton Eskimos	W 22–8	2–0	Commonwealth Stadium	36,553

== Regular season ==
=== Season standings ===
West Division
Pos	Team	Pld	W	L	T	PF	PA	PD	Pts	Div	Stk
1	Calgary Stampeders (Q)	18	15	3	0	646	418	228	30	7–3	L1
2	Edmonton Eskimos (Q)	18	12	6	0	507	372	135	24	7–3	W5
3	Saskatchewan Roughriders (Q)	18	11	7	0	511	495	16	22	5–5	W2
4	BC Lions (Q)	18	10	8	0	574	583	−9	20	3–7	L2
5	Sacramento Gold Miners	18	6	12	0	498	509	−11	12	3–7	W1

Source: "CFL.ca". Archived from the original on 2009-07-15.
(Q) Qualified for playoffs

=== Season schedule ===
Week	Game	Date	Opponent	Results		Venue	Attendance
Week	Game	Date	Opponent	Score	Record	Venue	Attendance
1	1	Tue, July 6	vs. Winnipeg Blue Bombers	W 54–34	1–0	McMahon Stadium	25,486
2	Bye						
3	2	Sat, July 17	at Sacramento Gold Miners	W 38–36	2–0	Hornet Stadium	20,082
4	3	Sat, July 24	at BC Lions	W 34–20	3–0	BC Place	31,119
5	4	Wed, July 28	vs. Toronto Argonauts	W 39–36	4–0	McMahon Stadium	25,510
5	5	Tue, Aug 3	at Winnipeg Blue Bombers	W 40–35	5–0	Winnipeg Stadium	23,869
6	6	Fri, Aug 6	at Ottawa Rough Riders	W 47–22	6–0	Frank Clair Stadium	27,341
7	7	Sat, Aug 14	vs. Ottawa Rough Riders	W 21–7	7–0	McMahon Stadium	24,153
8	8	Fri, Aug 20	at Hamilton Tiger-Cats	W 31–12	8–0	Ivor Wynne Stadium	19,402
9	9	Fri, Aug 27	vs. BC Lions	W 35–30	9–0	McMahon Stadium	27,011
10	10	Mon, Sept 6	vs. Edmonton Eskimos	W 33–13	10–0	McMahon Stadium	38,205
11	11	Fri, Sept 10	at Edmonton Eskimos	L 16–29	10–1	Commonwealth Stadium	54,324
12	12	Sat, Sept 18	vs. BC Lions	W 40–21	11–1	McMahon Stadium	29,110
13	13	Fri, Sept 24	vs. Hamilton Tiger-Cats	W 26–3	12–1	McMahon Stadium	29,817
14	Bye						
15	14	Sun, Oct 10	vs. Saskatchewan Roughriders	W 34–18	13–1	McMahon Stadium	28,210
16	15	Sun, Oct 17	at Toronto Argonauts	W 51–7	14–1	SkyDome	21,023
17	16	Sat, Oct 23	at Saskatchewan Roughriders	L 45–48	14–2	Taylor Field	26,137
18	17	Sat, Oct 30	vs. Sacramento Gold Miners	W 41–8	15–2	McMahon Stadium	26,105
19	18	Sun, Nov 7	at Edmonton Eskimos	L 21–39	15–3	Commonwealth Stadium	23,536

== Awards and records ==
- Annis Stukus Trophy – Wally Buono
- Jeff Nicklin Memorial Trophy – Doug Flutie (QB)
- Jackie Parker Trophy – Brian Wiggins (WR)
- DeMarco-Becket Memorial Trophy – Bruce Covernton (OT)
- Dr. Beattie Martin Trophy – David Sapunjis (SB)
- Dave Dryburgh Memorial Trophy – Mark McLoughlin (PK)

=== 1993 CFL All-Stars ===
- Quarterback - Doug Flutie
- Slotback - David Sapunjis
- Offensive Tackle - Bruce Covernton
- Defensive Tackle - Harald Hasselbach
- Defensive End - Will Johnson
- Cornerback - Karl Anthony

=== 1993 CFL West All-Stars ===
- Quarterback - Doug Flutie
- Slotback - David Sapunjis
- Offensive Guard - Rocco Romano
- Offensive Tackle - Bruce Covernton
- Defensive Tackle - Harald Hasselbach
- Defensive End - Will Johnson
- Middle Linebacker - Marvin Pope
- Cornerback - Karl Anthony

== Team Records ==
- Most regular season wins, season (15)
- Most regular season home wins, season (9)
- Most points for, season (646)
- Most passing touchdowns, season (49)
- Most passing yards, season (6,494)
- Most passing attempts, season (759)

== Playoffs ==
=== West Semi-Final ===
Team	Q1	Q2	Q3	Q4	Total
BC Lions	0	3	6	0	9
Calgary Stampeders	7	10	0	0	17

=== West Final ===
Team	Q1	Q2	Q3	Q4	Total
Edmonton Eskimos	0	8	7	14	29
Calgary Stampeders	10	3	0	2	15

== Roster ==
1993 Calgary Stampeders final roster
Quarterbacks: 20 Doug Flutie; 9 Steve Taylor; Running backs: 23 Keyvan Jenkins; 34 Andy McVey; 26 Tony Stewart; 36 Blair Zerr; Receivers: 88 Eddie Britton; 83 Derrick Crawford; 28 Duane Dmytryshyn; 79 Frank Marof; 82 Will Moore; 18 Allen Pitts; 25 Dave Sapunjis; 86 Demetrius Smith; 80 Brian Wiggins	Offensive linemen: 58 Lou Cafazzo G; 60 Bruce Covernton T; 67 Jamie Crysdale C; 56 Doug Davies C; 64 Ken Moore T; 59 Rocco Romano G; 69 Todd Storme G/T; Defensive linemen: 95 Harald Hasselbach DT; 84 Eric Johnson DE; 81 Will Johnson DE; 75 Stu Laird DT; 96 Srecko Zizakovic DE/DT; Special teams: 11 Tony Martino P/K; 13 Mark McLoughlin K	Linebackers: 70 Ray Biggs; 39 Mark Dube; 37 Matt Finlay; 51 Alondra Johnson; 91 Marvin Pope; Defensive backs: 19 Karl Anthony; 3 Doug Craft; 21 Greg Eaglin; 6 Greg Frers; 8 Greg Knox; 30 Kenton Leonard; 2 Junior Thurman; 38 Gerald Vaughn; 33 Ken Watson; Italics indicate International player
