= 1993 Winnipeg Blue Bombers season =

Canadian football team season

- General manager: Cal Murphy
- Head coach: Cal Murphy
- Home stadium: Winnipeg Stadium

Results
- Record: 14–4
- Division place: 1st, East
- Playoffs: Lost Grey Cup

The 1993 Winnipeg Blue Bombers finished in first place in the East Division with a 14–4 record. They appeared in the Grey Cup for the second straight year but lost to the Edmonton Eskimos.

== Offseason ==
=== CFL draft ===
Round	Pick	Player	Position	School

== Preseason ==
Game	Date	Opponent	Results		Venue	Attendance
Game	Date	Opponent	Score	Record	Venue	Attendance
A	Thu, June 17	vs. Sacramento Gold Miners	L 15–21	0–1	Winnipeg Stadium	23,191
B	Fri, June 25	at Saskatchewan Roughriders	W 40–17	1–1	Taylor Field	17,045

== Regular season ==
=== Season standings ===
East Division
Pos	Team	Pld	W	L	T	PF	PA	PD	Pts	Div	Stk
1	Winnipeg Blue Bombers (C, Q)	18	14	4	0	646	421	225	28	7–1	W6
2	Hamilton Tiger-Cats (Q)	18	6	12	0	316	567	−251	12	4–4	L3
3	Ottawa Rough Riders (Q)	18	4	14	0	387	517	−130	8	3–5	W1
4	Toronto Argonauts	18	3	15	0	390	593	−203	6	2–6	L5

Source: "CFL.ca". Archived from the original on 2009-07-15.
(C) First round bye; (Q) Qualified for playoffs

=== Season schedule ===
Week	Date	Opponent	Result	Record	Venue	Attendance
1	July 6	at Calgary Stampeders	L 34–54	0–1		
2	July 17	vs. BC Lions	W 36–14	1–1		
3	July 23	vs. Ottawa Rough Riders	W 21–18	2–1		
4	July 29	at Hamilton Tiger-Cats	W 40–11	3–1		
5	Aug 3	vs. Calgary Stampeders	L 35–40	3–2		
6	Aug 13	vs. Edmonton Eskimos	W 53–11	4–2		
7	Aug 18	at BC Lions	L 28–48	4–3		
8	Aug 21	at Sacramento Gold Miners	W 30–18	5–3		
9	Aug 29	vs. Hamilton Tiger-Cats	W 35–11	6–3		
10	Sept 5	at Saskatchewan Roughriders	W 25–24	7–3		
11	Sept 12	vs. Saskatchewan Roughriders	W 41–23	8–3		
12	Sept 19	at Toronto Argonauts	L 26–35	8–4		
13	Sept 26	at Edmonton Eskimos	W 52–14	9–4		
14	Oct 2	vs. Hamilton Tiger-Cats	W 61–10	10–4		
15	Oct 9	at Ottawa Rough Riders	W 48–38	11–4		
16	Oct 15	vs. Sacramento Gold Miners	W 33–26	12–4		
17	Oct 30	at Ottawa Rough Riders	W 36–16	13–4		
18	Nov 7	vs. Toronto Argonauts	W 12–10	14–4		

== Playoffs ==
=== East Final ===
Team	Q1	Q2	Q3	Q4	Total
Hamilton Tiger-Cats	3	16	0	0	19
Winnipeg Blue Bombers	13	0	0	7	20

=== Grey Cup ===
Team	Q1	Q2	Q3	Q4	Total
Edmonton Eskimos	17	7	0	9	33
Winnipeg Blue Bombers	0	10	7	6	23

== Roster ==
1993 Winnipeg Blue Bombers final roster
Quarterbacks: 16 Matt Dunigan; 9 Sammy Garza; 15 Keithen McCant; 8 Tom Porras; Running backs: 21 Blaise Bryant; 37 Duane Forde; 25 Chris Johnstone; 32 Matt Pearce; 31 Mike Richardson; Receivers: 86 Gerald Alphin; 88 Nathaniel Bolton; 17 Allan Boyko; 7 Alfred Jackson; 83 Andrew Martin; 87 Gerald Wilcox; 2 David Williams	Offensive linemen: 68 Nick Benjamin G; 51 David Black G/T; 64 Miles Gorrell T; 57 Brett MacNeil G; 65 Quinn Magnuson C/G; 60 Dave Vankoughnett C; 63 Chris Walby T; Defensive linemen: 99 Vaughn Booker DE; 69 Rob Davidson DE; 44 Leon Hatziioannou NT; 76 Loyd Lewis DE; 77 Stan Mikawos NT; 90 Keilly Rush DE; Special teams: 6 Bob Cameron P; 74 Troy Westwood K	Linebackers: 34 Greg Battle; 38 Del Lyles; 56 Elfrid Payton; 36 Paul Randolph; 35 Brendan Rogers; 92 Chris Tsangaris; 39 Alan Wetmore; Defensive backs: 3 Ousmane Bary; 38 Errol Brown; 20 Jayson Dzikowicz; 33 Bobby Evans; 22 Anthony Florence; 26 Kim Phillips; 30 Darryl Sampson; 19 Donald Smith; Italics indicate American player

== Awards and records ==
- CFL's Most Outstanding Offensive Lineman Award – Chris Walby (OT)

=== 1993 CFL All-Stars ===
- RB – Mike Richardson, CFL All-Star
- WR – David Williams, CFL All-Star
- OG – David Black, CFL All-Star
- OT – Chris Walby, CFL All-Star
- P – Bob Cameron, CFL All-Star
- LB – Elfrid Payton, CFL All-Star
- DB – Darryl Sampson, CFL All-Star
