= 1993 Saskatchewan Roughriders season =

CFL team season

- General manager: Alan Ford
- Head coach: Don Matthews
- Home stadium: Taylor Field

Results
- Record: 11–7
- Division place: 3rd, West
- Playoffs: Lost West Semi-Final

Uniform

The 1993 Saskatchewan Roughriders season was the 79th season in the club's 83rd year of existence. The team finished in third place in the Canadian Football League's West Division with an 11–7 record.

Notably, the 1993 Roughriders became the first team to lose to an American-based CFL team following their week 4 loss to the expansion Sacramento Gold Miners. The team had played the Gold Miners on the road with just three days of rest and would win 10 of their next 14 games following that loss. The Roughriders qualified for the playoffs but lost the West Semi-Final game to the Edmonton Eskimos.

The Roughriders set a single home game attendance record (33,032) when they defeated Sacramento on August 27.

== Offseason ==
=== CFL draft ===
Round	Pick	Player	Position	School
1	2	Brad Elberg	RB	Queen's
2	9	Brooks Findlay	LB	Portland State
3	15	Kevin Hickey	T	Ottawa
3	17	Erroll Brown	DB	Saskatchewan
4	25	Paul Cranmer	DB	Grand Valley State
5	33	Christian Daigle	DB	Bishop's
6	41	Kent Rowe	DE	Bishop's
7	49	Thane Watkins	C	Delaware State

== Preseason ==
Game	Date	Opponent	Results		Venue	Attendance
Game	Date	Opponent	Score	Record	Venue	Attendance
A	Fri, June 18	at Calgary Stampeders	L 21–11	0–1	McMahon Stadium	29,280
B	Fri, June 25	vs Winnipeg Blue Bombers	L 17–40	0–2	Taylor Field	17,045
C	Bye					

== Regular season ==
=== Season standings ===
West Division
Pos	Team	Pld	W	L	T	PF	PA	PD	Pts	Div	Stk
1	Calgary Stampeders (Q)	18	15	3	0	646	418	228	30	7–3	L1
2	Edmonton Eskimos (Q)	18	12	6	0	507	372	135	24	7–3	W5
3	Saskatchewan Roughriders (Q)	18	11	7	0	511	495	16	22	5–5	W2
4	BC Lions (Q)	18	10	8	0	574	583	−9	20	3–7	L2
5	Sacramento Gold Miners	18	6	12	0	498	509	−11	12	3–7	W1

Source: "CFL.ca". Archived from the original on 2009-07-15.
(Q) Qualified for playoffs

=== Season schedule ===
Week	Game	Date	Opponent	Results		Venue	Attendance
Week	Game	Date	Opponent	Score	Record	Venue	Attendance
1	1	Fri, July 9	at BC Lions	L 26–33 (OT)	0–1	BC Place	25,849
2	2	Thu, July 15	vs. Edmonton Eskimos	W 23–22	1–1	Taylor Field	17,566
3	3	Wed, July 21	at Edmonton Eskimos	L 3–35	1–2	Commonwealth Stadium	27,894
3	4	Sat, July 24	at Sacramento Gold Miners	L 26–37	1–3	Hornet Stadium	17,319
4	5	Sat, July 31	vs. Toronto Argonauts	W 36–17	2–3	Taylor Field	18,212
5	6	Fri, Aug 6	at Hamilton Tiger-Cats	W 37–10	3–3	Ivor Wynne Stadium	16,061
6	7	Wed, Aug 11	vs. Ottawa Rough Riders	W 45–28	4–3	Taylor Field	20,254
7	8	Thu, Aug 19	at Ottawa Rough Riders	W 27–26	5–3	Lansdowne Park	23,643
8	9	Fri, Aug 27	vs. Sacramento Gold Miners	W 26–23	6–3	Taylor Field	33,032
9	10	Sun, Sept 5	vs. Winnipeg Blue Bombers	L 24–25	6–4	Taylor Field	30,216
10	11	Sun, Sept 12	at Winnipeg Blue Bombers	L 23–41	6–5	Winnipeg Stadium	35,959
11	12	Sun, Sept 19	vs. Sacramento Gold Miners	W 27–20	7–5	Taylor Field	25,367
12	13	Sat, Sept 25	at BC Lions	W 31–16	8–5	BC Place	31,888
13	14	Fri, Oct 1	vs. BC Lions	L 28–50	8–6	Taylor Field	22,103
14	15	Sun, Oct 10	at Calgary Stampeders	L 18–34	8–7	McMahon Stadium	28,210
15	16	Sun, Oct 17	vs. Hamilton Tiger-Cats	W 33–10	9–7	Taylor Field	21,023
16	17	Sat, Oct 23	vs. Calgary Stampeders	W 48–45	10–7	Taylor Field	26,137
17	18	Sun, Oct 31	at Toronto Argonauts	W 30–23	11–7	SkyDome	29,348
18	Bye						

== Postseason ==
=== Schedule ===
Round	Date	Opponent	Results		Venue	Attendance
Round	Date	Opponent	Score	Record	Venue	Attendance
West Semi-Final	Sun, Nov 14	at Edmonton Eskimos	L 13–51	0–1	Commonwealth Stadium	26,397

== Roster ==
1993 Saskatchewan Roughriders final roster
Quarterbacks: 5 Kent Austin; 6 Warren Jones; Running backs: 15 Bruce Boyko; 26 David Pitcher; 33 Mike Saunders; 25 Darrell Wallace; Receivers: 81 Ray Elgaard; 7 Tre Everett; 18 Jeff Fairholm; 10 Dan Farthing; 88 Dane McArthur; 80 Don Narcisse	Offensive linemen: 66 Mike Anderson C; 64 Wayne Drinkwalter G/DT; 59 Craig Hendrickson T; 63 Scott Hendrickson G/C; 67 Tom MacCallum T/G; 57 Dan Payne T; 61 Paul Vajda G; Defensive linemen: 98 Jearld Baylis DT; 96 Sean Brantley DT; 39 Stewart Hill DE; 71 Bobby Jurasin DE; 79 Gary Lewis DT	Linebackers: 95 Ray Bernard; 99 Maurice Crum; 97 Brooks Findlay; 91 Peter Miller; 74 Dan Rashovich; Defensive backs: 8 Charles Anthony; 4 Albert Brown; 24 Ventson Donelson; 9 Carlton Lance; 27 Glen Suitor; 2 Terryl Ulmer; 3 Barry Wilburn; Special teams: 13 Brent Matich P; 36 Dave Ridgway K; Italics indicate American player

== Awards and records ==
- CFL's Most Outstanding Defensive Player Award – Jearld Baylis (DT)

=== 1993 CFL All-Stars ===
==== Offence ====
- SB – Ray Elgaard

==== Defence ====
- DT – Jearld Baylis
- CB – Barry Wilburn
- DS – Glen Suitor

==== Special teams ====
- K – Dave Ridgway

=== 1993 Western All-Stars ===
==== Offence ====
- SB – Ray Elgaard
- WR – Don Narcisse

==== Defence ====
- DT – Jearld Baylis
- CB – Barry Wilburn
- DS – Glen Suitor

==== Special teams ====
- K – Dave Ridgway
