= 1993 Ottawa Rough Riders season =

Canadian football team season

- Head coach: Ron Smeltzer
- Home stadium: Frank Clair Stadium

Results
- Record: 4–14
- Division place: 3rd, East
- Playoffs: Lost East Semi-Final

Uniform

The 1993 Ottawa Rough Riders finished third place in the East Division with a 4–14 record. They were defeated in the East Semi-Final by the Hamilton Tiger-Cats.

== Offseason ==
=== CFL draft ===
Rd	Pick	Player	Position	School
1	3	Paul Yatkowski	DT	Tennessee
2	10	Dwight Richards	RB	Weber State
3	18	Nigel Levy	WR	Western Ontario
5	34	Jason Moller	OL	Queen's
6	42	Fred Marquette	OL	Concordia
7	50	James Monroe	C	Syracuse

=== Preseason ===
Game	Date	Opponent	Results		Venue	Attendance
Game	Date	Opponent	Score	Record	Venue	Attendance
A	Mon, June 21	vs. Toronto Argonauts	W 30–25	1–0	Lansdowne Park	15,895
B	Fri, June 25	at Hamilton Tiger-Cats	W 19–15	2–0	Ivor Wynne Stadium	

== Regular season ==
=== Season standings ===
East Division
Pos	Team	Pld	W	L	T	PF	PA	PD	Pts	Div	Stk
1	Winnipeg Blue Bombers (C, Q)	18	14	4	0	646	421	225	28	7–1	W6
2	Hamilton Tiger-Cats (Q)	18	6	12	0	316	567	−251	12	4–4	L3
3	Ottawa Rough Riders (Q)	18	4	14	0	387	517	−130	8	3–5	W1
4	Toronto Argonauts	18	3	15	0	390	593	−203	6	2–6	L5

Source: "CFL.ca". Archived from the original on 2009-07-15.
(C) First round bye; (Q) Qualified for playoffs

=== Schedule ===
Week	Game	Date	Opponent	Results		Venue	Attendance
Week	Game	Date	Opponent	Score	Record	Venue	Attendance
1	1	July 7	vs. Sacramento Gold Miners	W 32–23	1–0	Frank Clair Stadium	23,916
2	2	July 16	vs. Hamilton Tiger-Cats	L 20–21	1–1	Frank Clair Stadium	
3	3	July 23	at Winnipeg Blue Bombers	L 18–21	1–2	Winnipeg Stadium	19,030
4	4	July 30	at BC Lions	L 24–28	1–3	BC Place	22,667
5	5	Aug 6	vs. Calgary Stampeders	L 22–47	1–4	Frank Clair Stadium	27,341
6	6	Aug 11	at Saskatchewan Roughriders	L 28–45	1–5	Taylor Field	20,254
7	7	Aug 14	at Calgary Stampeders	L 7–21	1–6	McMahon Stadium	24,153
8	8	Aug 19	vs. Saskatchewan Roughriders	L 26–27	1–7	Frank Clair Stadium	23,463
9	9	Aug 25	at Toronto Argonauts	W 26–25	2–7	SkyDome	21,327
10	10	Sept 4	vs. BC Lions	L 24–25	2–8	Frank Clair Stadium	21,567
11	11	Sept 11	at Sacramento Gold Miners	L 15–47	2–9	Hornet Stadium	16,510
12	12	Sept 25	vs. Toronto Argonauts	W 30–22	3–9	Frank Clair Stadium	24,631
13	13	Oct 3	at Toronto Argonauts	L 16–17	3–10	SkyDome	24,087
14	14	Oct 9	vs. Winnipeg Blue Bombers	L 38–48	3–11	Frank Clair Stadium	18,486
15	15	Oct 16	at Edmonton Eskimos	L 1–19	3–12	Commonwealth Stadium	25,140
16	16	Oct 22	vs. Edmonton Eskimos	L 17–19	3–13	Frank Clair Stadium	19,580
17	17	Oct 30	vs. Winnipeg Blue Bombers	L 16–36	3–14	Frank Clair Stadium	19,240
18	18	Nov 7	at Hamilton Tiger-Cats	W 27–26	4–14	Ivor Wynne Stadium	17,032

== Postseason ==
Round	Date	Opponent	Results		Venue	Attendance
Round	Date	Opponent	Score	Record	Venue	Attendance
East Semi-final	Sun, Nov 14	at Hamilton Tiger-Cats	L 10–21	4–15	Ivor Wynne Stadium	18,781

== Roster ==
1993 Ottawa Rough Riders final roster
Quarterbacks: 13 Tom Burgess; 14 Marquel Fleetwood; 6 Terrence Jones; Running backs: 19 Reggie Barnes; 34 Shawn Daniels; 20 Darren Joseph; 35 Dean Noel; 32 Ernie Schramayr; Receivers: 81 Jock Climie P; 79 Rob Crifo; 85 James Ellingson; 89 Stephen Jones; 86 Nigel Levy; 87 Tyrone Shavers; 80 Walter Stanley; 84 Wayne Walker	Offensive linemen: 64 Bruce Beaton T; 53 Denny Chronopoulos T/G; 54 Irv Daymond C; 58 Chris Gioskos G; 57 Mike Graybill T; 56 Michel Lamy G; 55 Pat Mahon C/G; 51 Jacques Moreau T/G; Defensive linemen: 74 Dave Chaytors DT; 73 John Kropke DT; 68 Glenn Kulka DE; 63 Michel Raby DT; 98 Lybrant Robinson DE; 76 Andrew Stewart DE; Special teams: 10 Terry Baker K/P	Linebackers: 48 Daved Benefield; 47 Ron Goetz; 16 Maurice Henry; 36 Joe Sardo; 91 Angelo Snipes; 45 Greg Stumon; 43 Gord Weber; 31 Paul Wetmore; Defensive backs: 38 Patrick Burke; 21 Burt Cummings; 7 Anthony Drawhorn; 25 Joe Fuller; 26 Charles Gordon; 18 Joe Mero; 24 Remi Trudel; 29 Ken Walcott; 39 Charlie Wright; 23 Brett Young; Italics indicate International player

== Awards and honours ==
=== 1993 CFL All-Stars ===
- None
