= 1993 Hamilton Tiger-Cats season =

Season of Canadian Football League team the Hamilton Tiger-Cats

- Head coach: John Gregory
- Home stadium: Ivor Wynne Stadium

Results
- Record: 6–12
- Division place: 2nd, East
- Playoffs: Lost East Final
- Team MOP: Earl Winfield
- Team MOC: Michael O'Shea
- Team MOR: Michael O'Shea

The 1993 Hamilton Tiger-Cats season was the 36th season for the team in the Canadian Football League (CFL) and their 44th overall. The Tiger-Cats finished in second place in the East Division with a 6–12 record. After defeating the Ottawa Rough Riders in the East Semi-Final, the team appeared in the East Final, but lost to the heavily favoured Winnipeg Blue Bombers by a single point.

== Offseason ==
=== CFL draft ===
Rd	Pick	Player	Position	School
2	12	P.J. Martin	FB	Wilfrid Laurier
3	20	Ara Ishkanian	DE	Cal State Fullerton
4	23	Frank Yeboah-Kodie	CB	Penn State
4	28	Gavin Palmer	LB	Boston U.
4	29	Sean Grayson	TE	Virginia Tech
5	36	Richard Fischer	DE	Toronto
6	44	Tony D'Agostino	TB	McMaster
7	52	Eric Dell	DT	Queen's

== Preseason ==
Game	Date	Opponent	Results		Venue	Attendance
Game	Date	Opponent	Score	Record	Venue	Attendance
B	Fri, June 25	vs. Ottawa Rough Riders	W 19–15	1–0	Ivor Wynne Stadium	
C	Tue, June 29	at Toronto Argonauts	W 39–25	2–0	SkyDome	30,980

== Regular season ==
=== Season standings ===
East Division
Pos	Team	Pld	W	L	T	PF	PA	PD	Pts	Div	Stk
1	Winnipeg Blue Bombers (C, Q)	18	14	4	0	646	421	225	28	7–1	W6
2	Hamilton Tiger-Cats (Q)	18	6	12	0	316	567	−251	12	4–4	L3
3	Ottawa Rough Riders (Q)	18	4	14	0	387	517	−130	8	3–5	W1
4	Toronto Argonauts	18	3	15	0	390	593	−203	6	2–6	L5

Source: "CFL.ca". Archived from the original on 2009-07-15.
(C) First round bye; (Q) Qualified for playoffs

=== Schedule ===
Week	Game	Date	Opponent	Results		Venue	Attendance
Week	Game	Date	Opponent	Score	Record	Venue	Attendance
1	1	July 10	vs. Sacramento Gold Miners	W 30–14	1–0		
2	2	July 16	at Ottawa Rough Riders	W 21–20	2–0		
3	3	July 22	at Toronto Argonauts	W 25–9	3–0		
4	4	July 29	vs. Winnipeg Blue Bombers	L 11–40	3–1		
5	5	Aug 6	vs. Saskatchewan Roughriders	L 10–37	3–2		
6	6	Aug 14	at Sacramento Gold Miners	L 10–46	3–3		
7	7	Aug 20	vs. Calgary Stampeders	L 12–31	3–4		
8	8	Aug 25	at Edmonton Eskimos	L 8–46	3–5		
8	9	Aug 28	at Winnipeg Blue Bombers	L 11–35	3–6		
9	10	Sept 6	vs. Toronto Argonauts	W 23–21	4–6		
10	11	Sept 11	at BC Lions	L 25–55	4–7		
11	12	Sept 17	vs. Edmonton Eskimos	W 34–10	5–7		
12	13	Sept 24	at Calgary Stampeders	L 3–26	5–8		
13	14	Oct 2	at Winnipeg Blue Bombers	L 10–61	5–9		
14	15	Oct 11	vs. Toronto Argonauts	W 28–20	6–9		
15	16	Oct 17	at Saskatchewan Roughriders	L 10–33	6–10		
16	17	Oct 24	vs. BC Lions	L 19–36	6–11		
17	Bye						
18	18	Nov 7	vs. Ottawa Rough Riders	L 26–27	6–12		

== Postseason ==
Round	Date	Opponent	Results		Venue	Attendance
Round	Date	Opponent	Score	Record	Venue	Attendance
East Semi-Final	Nov 14	vs. Ottawa Rough Riders	W 21–10	1–0		
East Final	Nov 21	at Winnipeg Blue Bombers	L 19–20	1–1		

== Roster ==
1993 Hamilton Tiger-Cats final roster
Quarterbacks: 16 Don McPherson; 19 Bob Torrance; Running backs: 33 Paul Bushey; 12 Dave Dinnall; 25 Lee Knight; 31 P. J. Martin; 32 Bruce Perkins; Receivers: 89 Cornell Burbage; 17 Ken Evraire; 5 Joey Jauch; 88 Lonzell Hill; 80 Nick Mazzoli; 85 Richard Nurse; 1 Earl Winfield	Offensive linemen: 68 Scott Douglas G; 62 Pete Giftopoulos T; 63 Darrell Harle C/G; 67 Mike Jovanovich G/T; 51 David Richardson T; 56 Jason Riley G; 56 Dale Sanderson C; 66 Rob Wallow T; Defensive linemen: 93 Romel Andrews DE; 55 Tim Cofield DE; 92 Steve Bates DE; 95 Jeff Fields DT; 90 Reggie Rogers DT; 91 Brett Williams DE; 98 Lubo Zizakovic DT	Linebackers: 41 Darrell Beavers; 42 John Motton; 59 Mike O'Shea; 34 Mark Scott; Defensive backs: 27 Bobby Dawson; 4 Corris Ervin; 15 Roger Hennig; 40 Tim Jackson; 2 Jim Jauch; 24 Derrick Kelson; 26 Rickey Royal; 20 Gary Wilkerson; 6 Todd Wiseman; 7 Terry Wright; Special teams: 3 Paul Osbaldiston K/P; Italics indicate American players
