= 1992 CFL season =

Canadian Football League season

- Duration: July 8 – November 8, 1992
- East champions: Winnipeg Blue Bombers
- West champions: Calgary Stampeders

80th Grey Cup
- Date: November 29, 1992
- Venue: SkyDome, Toronto
- Champions: Calgary Stampeders

CFL seasons
- ← 1991 1993 →

Canadian Football League team locations: West, East

The 1992 CFL season is considered to be the 39th season in modern-day Canadian football, although it is officially the 35th Canadian Football League season.

== CFL news in 1992 ==
The CFL celebrated 100 years of football in Canada, commemorating the formation of the Canadian Rugby Union in 1892, the forerunner of Football Canada and the CFL. Former Alouette running back/tight end, Larry Smith was named as the ninth CFL Commissioner in history on Thursday, February 27.

The Calgary Stampeders then owned by Larry Ryckman, signed free agent quarterback, Doug Flutie in March. The CFL revoked the franchise of BC Lions owner Murray Pezim and assumed control of the team, when Pezim refused to pay off club bills, on August 27. After one month, Bill Comrie purchased the BC Lions franchise from the CFL on September 23.

At the CFL Awards, Doug Flutie was named as the CFL's Most Outstanding Player for the second straight season, only becoming the third player to do so. Toronto played host to the Grey Cup for the 45th time, which is more than any other city. In addition, the Calgary Stampeders won their first Grey Cup championship in 21 years; ending the longest drought at that time of any CFL city, by defeating the Winnipeg Blue Bombers, 24–10.

In June 1992, the CFL played a preseason game between Toronto and Calgary in Portland, Oregon. It was a predecessor to the CFL USA expansion that would begin the next year.

== Regular season standings ==
West Division
Pos	Team	Pld	W	L	T	PF	PA	PD	Pts	Div	Stk
1	Calgary Stampeders (C, Q)	18	13	5	0	607	430	177	26	8–2	W1
2	Edmonton Eskimos (Q)	18	10	8	0	552	515	37	20	5–5	W1
3	Saskatchewan Roughriders (Q)	18	9	9	0	505	545	−40	18	6–4	L1
4	BC Lions	18	3	15	0	472	667	−195	6	1–9	L7

Source: "CFL.ca - Official Site of the Canadian Football League". Archived from the original on August 10, 2011.
(C) First round bye; (Q) Qualified for playoffs

East Division
Pos	Team	Pld	W	L	T	PF	PA	PD	Pts	Div	Stk
1	Winnipeg Blue Bombers (C, Q)	18	11	7	0	507	499	8	22	7–3	W5
2	Hamilton Tiger-Cats (Q)	18	11	7	0	536	514	22	22	5–5	W2
3	Ottawa Rough Riders (Q)	18	9	9	0	484	439	45	18	6–4	L1
4	Toronto Argonauts	18	6	12	0	469	523	−54	12	3–7	L3

Source: "CFL.ca - Official Site of the Canadian Football League". Archived from the original on August 10, 2011.
(C) First round bye; (Q) Qualified for playoffs

== Grey Cup playoffs ==
The Calgary Stampeders are the 1992 Grey Cup champions, defeating the Winnipeg Blue Bombers 24–10, at Toronto's SkyDome. This was the first championship for the Stampeders in 21 years, ending the longest existing drought at the time, having previously won the 1971 Grey Cup Game over the Toronto Argonauts. Incidentally, the Saskatchewan Roughriders ended a 23-year drought several years earlier with a win in the 1989 Grey Cup Game, which was played at the same venue as the 1992 game. The Stampeders' Doug Flutie (QB) was named the Grey Cup's Most Valuable Player and Dave Sapunjis (SB) was the Grey Cup's Most Valuable Canadian.

=== Playoff bracket ===
November 15: Division Semifinals
East
E3	Ottawa Rough Riders	28
E2	Hamilton Tiger-Cats	29
West
W3	Saskatchewan Roughriders	20
W2	Edmonton Eskimos	22

November 22: Division Finals
E2	Hamilton Tiger-Cats	11
E1	Winnipeg Blue Bombers	59
W2	Edmonton Eskimos	22
W1	Calgary Stampeders	23

November 29: 80th Grey Cup @ SkyDome – Toronto, Ontario
E1	Winnipeg Blue Bombers	10
W1	Calgary Stampeders	24

== CFL leaders ==
- CFL passing leaders
- CFL rushing leaders
- CFL receiving leaders

== 1992 CFL All-Stars ==
=== Offence ===
- QB – Doug Flutie, Calgary Stampeders
- FB – Blake Marshall, Edmonton Eskimos
- RB – Mike Richardson, Winnipeg Blue Bombers
- SB – Ray Elgaard, Saskatchewan Roughriders
- SB – Allen Pitts, Calgary Stampeders
- WR – Stephen Jones, Ottawa Rough Riders
- WR – Jim Sandusky, Edmonton Eskimos
- C – Rod Connop, Edmonton Eskimos
- OG – Pierre Vercheval, Edmonton Eskimos
- OG – Rocco Romano, Calgary Stampeders
- OT – Robert Smith, Ottawa Rough Riders
- OT – Vic Stevenson, Saskatchewan Roughriders

=== Defence ===
- DT – Rodney Harding, Toronto Argonauts
- DT – Jearld Baylis, Saskatchewan Roughriders
- DE – Will Johnson, Calgary Stampeders
- DE – Bobby Jurasin, Saskatchewan Roughriders
- LB – Angelo Snipes, Ottawa Rough Riders
- LB – Willie Pless, Edmonton Eskimos
- LB – John Motton, Hamilton Tiger-Cats
- CB – Less Browne, Ottawa Rough Riders
- CB – Junior Thurman, Calgary Stampeders
- DB – Anthony Drawhorn, Ottawa Rough Riders
- DB – Darryl Hall, Calgary Stampeders
- DS – Glen Suitor, Saskatchewan Roughriders

=== Special teams ===
- P – Hank Ilesic, Toronto Argonauts
- K – Troy Westwood, Winnipeg Blue Bombers
- ST – Henry "Gizmo" Williams, Edmonton Eskimos

== 1992 Eastern All-Stars ==
=== Offence ===
- QB – Tom Burgess, Ottawa Rough Riders
- FB – Warren Hudson, Winnipeg Blue Bombers
- RB – Mike Richardson, Winnipeg Blue Bombers
- SB – Rob Crifo, Winnipeg Blue Bombers
- SB – Ken Evraire, Hamilton Tiger-Cats
- WR – Stephen Jones, Ottawa Rough Riders
- WR – Larry Thompson, Winnipeg Blue Bombers
- C – Irv Daymond, Ottawa Rough Riders
- OG – Dan Ferrone, Toronto Argonauts
- OG – Jason Riley, Hamilton Tiger-Cats
- OT – Robert Smith, Ottawa Rough Riders
- OT – Chris Walby, Winnipeg Blue Bombers

=== Defence ===
- DT – Rodney Harding, Toronto Argonauts
- DT – Jeff Fields, Hamilton Tiger-Cats
- DE – John Kropke, Ottawa Rough Riders
- DE – Mike Campbell, Toronto Argonauts
- LB – Angelo Snipes, Ottawa Rough Riders
- LB – Greg Stumon, Ottawa Rough Riders
- LB – John Motton, Hamilton Tiger-Cats
- CB – Less Browne, Ottawa Rough Riders
- CB – Rod Hill, Winnipeg Blue Bombers
- DB – Anthony Drawhorn, Ottawa Rough Riders
- DB – Don Wilson, Toronto Argonauts
- DS – Todd Wiseman, Hamilton Tiger-Cats

=== Special teams ===
- P – Hank Ilesic, Toronto Argonauts
- K – Troy Westwood, Winnipeg Blue Bombers
- ST – Raghib Ismail, Toronto Argonauts

== 1992 Western All-Stars ==
=== Offence ===
- QB – Doug Flutie, Calgary Stampeders
- FB – Blake Marshall, Edmonton Eskimos
- RB – Jon Volpe, BC Lions
- SB – Ray Elgaard, Saskatchewan Roughriders
- SB – Allen Pitts, Calgary Stampeders
- WR – Darren Flutie, BC Lions
- WR – Jim Sandusky, Edmonton Eskimos
- C – Rod Connop, Edmonton Eskimos
- OG – Pierre Vercheval, Edmonton Eskimos
- OG – Rocco Romano, Calgary Stampeders
- OT – Jim Mills, BC Lions
- OT – Vic Stevenson, Saskatchewan Roughriders

=== Defence ===
- DT – Jerald Baylis, Saskatchewan Roughriders
- DT – Lloyd Lewis, Edmonton Eskimos
- DE – Will Johnson, Calgary Stampeders
- DE – Bobby Jurasin, Saskatchewan Roughriders
- LB – Alondra Johnson, Calgary Stampeders
- LB – Willie Pless, Edmonton Eskimos
- LB – Matt Finlay, Calgary Stampeders
- CB – Damion Lyons, Edmonton Eskimos
- CB – Junior Thurman, Calgary Stampeders
- DB – Enis Jackson, Edmonton Eskimos
- DB – Darryl Hall, Calgary Stampeders
- DS – Glen Suitor, Saskatchewan Roughriders

=== Special teams ===
- P – Lui Passaglia, BC Lions
- K – Mark McLoughlin, Calgary Stampeders
- ST – Henry "Gizmo" Williams, Edmonton Eskimos

== 1992 CFL Awards ==
- CFL's Most Outstanding Player Award – Doug Flutie (QB), Calgary Stampeders
- CFL's Most Outstanding Canadian Award – Ray Elgaard (SB), Saskatchewan Roughriders
- CFL's Most Outstanding Defensive Player Award – Willie Pless (LB), Edmonton Eskimos
- CFL's Most Outstanding Offensive Lineman Award – Robert Smith (OT), Ottawa Rough Riders
- CFL's Most Outstanding Rookie Award – Mike Richardson (RB), Winnipeg Blue Bombers
- CFLPA's Outstanding Community Service Award – Danny Barrett (QB), BC Lions
- CFL's Coach of the Year – Wally Buono, Calgary Stampeders
- Commissioner's Award - Tom Shepherd, Saskatchewan Roughriders
