= 1993 BC Lions season =

Canadian football team season

- Owner: Bill Comrie
- General manager: Eric Tillman
- Head coach: Dave Ritchie
- Home stadium: BC Place Stadium

Results
- Record: 10–8
- Division place: 4th, West
- Playoffs: Lost West Semi-Final

Uniform

The 1993 BC Lions finished in fourth place in the West Division with a 10–8 record. They appeared in the West semi-final but lost to the Calgary Stampeders.

== Offseason ==
=== CFL draft ===
Round	Pick	Player	Position	School
1	1	Patrick Burke	DB	Fresno College
2	7	Tom Europe	DB	Bishop's
5	31	Paul Pakulak	SB	Simon Fraser
6	39	Reinhart Keller	DL	Wilfrid Laurier
7	47	Ted Gerela Jr.	LB	Rocky Mountain College

== Preseason ==
Game	Date	Opponent	Results		Venue	Attendance
Game	Date	Opponent	Score	Record	Venue	Attendance
A	Sat, June 26	at Sacramento Gold Miners	L 20–29	0–1	Hornet Stadium	18,630
B	Wed, June 30	vs. Edmonton Eskimos	L 20–27	0–2	BC Place	

== Regular season ==
=== Season standings ===
West Division
Pos	Team	Pld	W	L	T	PF	PA	PD	Pts	Div	Stk
1	Calgary Stampeders (Q)	18	15	3	0	646	418	228	30	7–3	L1
2	Edmonton Eskimos (Q)	18	12	6	0	507	372	135	24	7–3	W5
3	Saskatchewan Roughriders (Q)	18	11	7	0	511	495	16	22	5–5	W2
4	BC Lions (Q)	18	10	8	0	574	583	−9	20	3–7	L2
5	Sacramento Gold Miners	18	6	12	0	498	509	−11	12	3–7	W1

Source: "CFL.ca". Archived from the original on 2009-07-15.
(Q) Qualified for playoffs

=== Season schedule ===
Week	Game	Date	Opponent	Results		Venue	Attendance
Week	Game	Date	Opponent	Score	Record	Venue	Attendance
1	Bye						
2	1	Fri, July 9	at Saskatchewan Roughriders	W 33–26	1–0	Taylor Field	25,849
3	2	Wed, July 14	at Toronto Argonauts	W 40–27	2–0	SkyDome	26,759
3	3	Sat, July 17	at Winnipeg Blue Bombers	L 14–36	2–1	Winnipeg Stadium	20,665
4	4	Sat, July 24	vs. Calgary Stampeders	L 20–34	2–2	BC Place	31,199
5	5	Fri, July 30	vs. Ottawa Rough Riders	W 28–24	3–2	BC Place	22,667
6	6	Sat, Aug 7	at Edmonton Eskimos	W 39–23	4–2	Commonwealth Stadium	25,236
7	7	Thu, Aug 12	vs. Toronto Argonauts	W 55–38	5–2	BC Place	24,691
8	8	Wed, Aug 18	vs. Winnipeg Blue Bombers	W 48–28	6–2	BC Place	28,541
9	9	Fri, Aug 27	at Calgary Stampeders	L 30–35	6–3	McMahon Stadium	27,011
10	10	Sat, Sept 4	at Ottawa Rough Riders	W 25–24	7–3	Lansdowne Park	21,567
11	11	Sat, Sept 11	vs. Hamilton Tiger-Cats	W 55–25	8–3	BC Place	24,789
12	12	Sat, Sept 18	at Calgary Stampeders	L 21–40	8–4	McMahon Stadium	29,110
13	13	Sat, Sept 25	vs. Saskatchewan Roughriders	L 16–31	8–5	BC Place	31,888
14	14	Fri, Oct 1	at Saskatchewan Roughriders	W 50–28	9–5	Taylor Field	22,103
15	15	Fri, Oct 8	vs. Sacramento Gold Miners	L 23–27	9–6	BC Place	30,615
16	Bye						
17	16	Sun, Oct 24	at Hamilton Tiger-Cats	W 26–19	10–6	Ivor Wynne Stadium	11,574
18	17	Fri, Oct 29	vs. Edmonton Eskimos	L 14–54	10–7	BC Place	35,674
19	18	Sat, Nov 6	at Sacramento Gold Miners	L 27–64	10–8	Hornet Stadium	18,748

== Roster ==
1993 BC Lions final roster
Quarterbacks: 9 Danny Barrett; 2 Giulio Caravatta P; 14 Danny McManus; Running backs: 34 Ryan Hanson; 25 Sean Millington; 6 Cory Philpot; 20 Chris Skinner; Receivers: 88 Ray Alexander; 4 Freeman Baysinger; 85 Matt Clark; 82 Darren Flutie; 16 Spencer McLennan; 89 Yo Murphy; 77 Mike Trevathan; 21 Lonnie Turner	Offensive linemen: 59 Todd Furdyk T; 53 Leo Groenewegen G; 68 Cory Mantyka G/T; 66 Jim Mills T; 55 Ian Sinclair C; 58 Rob Smith G; 63 Vic Stevenson T; 60 Jamie Taras G/C; Defensive linemen: 98 Tim Lorenz DE; 95 John MacNeill DE/DT; 79 Derek MacCready DT; 91 Kent Warnock DE/DT; 72 Glen Scrivener DE; Special teams: 5 Lui Passaglia K/P	Linebackers: 44 Zock Allen; 57 O. J. Brigance; 39 Matt Clarke; 90 Doug Hocking; 42 Jeff Jackson; 56 James West; 27 Donovan Wright; Defensive backs: 26 Michael Allen; 0 Less Browne; 13 Tom Europe; 22 Sean Foudy; 1 Andre Francis; 7 Derek Grier; 19 Shawn Jones; 3 Kelly Sims; Italics indicate International player

== Awards and records ==
=== 1993 CFL All-Stars ===
- FB – Sean Millington, CFL All-Star
- OG – Rob Smith, CFL All-Star

== Playoffs ==
=== West semi-final ===
Team	Q1	Q2	Q3	Q4	Total
Calgary Stampeders	7	10	0	0	17
BC Lions	0	3	6	0	9
