= 1993 CFL season =

Canadian Football League season

- Duration: July 6 – November 7, 1993
- East champions: Winnipeg Blue Bombers
- West champions: Edmonton Eskimos

81st Grey Cup
- Date: November 28, 1993
- Venue: McMahon Stadium, Calgary
- Champions: Edmonton Eskimos

CFL seasons
- ← 1992 1994 →

Canadian Football League team locations: West, East

The 1993 CFL season is considered to be the 40th season in modern-day Canadian football, although it is officially the 36th Canadian Football League season.

== CFL news in 1993 ==
On February 23, the Sacramento Gold Miners were announced as the CFL's ninth franchise, during the league's annual meetings in Hamilton. The team began play in 1993 at Hornet Stadium in Sacramento, California. They joined the West Division. Sacramento became the first U.S.-based team to play in the CFL, and it was the first expansion team to be admitted into the league since 1954, when the B.C. Lions became a franchise. A potential expansion team to San Antonio, Texas (the San Antonio Riders, formerly of the then-suspended WLAF, to play as the San Antonio Texans) was put on hold for the 1993 season after the team folded instead.

On March 6, The Canadian College Draft was held in Calgary at the Jubilee Auditorium, becoming the first Western Canadian city to host the event since Winnipeg in 1971. Calgary also played host to the Grey Cup game for only the second time in history on Sunday, November 28. In that game, the Edmonton Eskimos defeated the Winnipeg Blue Bombers, 33–23 before a crowd of 50,035.

Records: Dave Ridgway set the CFL record for consecutive field goals made with 28.

This season was rare in CFL history in that no single player gained 1,000 yards rushing. Winnipeg's Michael Richardson led the league with 925 yards.

== Regular season standings ==
West Division
Pos	Team	Pld	W	L	T	PF	PA	PD	Pts	Div	Stk
1	Calgary Stampeders (Q)	18	15	3	0	646	418	228	30	7–3	L1
2	Edmonton Eskimos (Q)	18	12	6	0	507	372	135	24	7–3	W5
3	Saskatchewan Roughriders (Q)	18	11	7	0	511	495	16	22	5–5	W2
4	BC Lions (Q)	18	10	8	0	574	583	−9	20	3–7	L2
5	Sacramento Gold Miners	18	6	12	0	498	509	−11	12	3–7	W1

Source: "CFL.ca". Archived from the original on July 15, 2009.
(Q) Qualified for playoffs

East Division
Pos	Team	Pld	W	L	T	PF	PA	PD	Pts	Div	Stk
1	Winnipeg Blue Bombers (C, Q)	18	14	4	0	646	421	225	28	7–1	W6
2	Hamilton Tiger-Cats (Q)	18	6	12	0	316	567	−251	12	4–4	L3
3	Ottawa Rough Riders (Q)	18	4	14	0	387	517	−130	8	3–5	W1
4	Toronto Argonauts	18	3	15	0	390	593	−203	6	2–6	L5

Source: "CFL.ca". Archived from the original on July 15, 2009.
(C) First round bye; (Q) Qualified for playoffs

Winnipeg gets a first round bye.

== Grey Cup playoffs ==
The Edmonton Eskimos are the 1993 Grey Cup champions, defeating the Winnipeg Blue Bombers 33–23, at Calgary's McMahon Stadium. The Eskimos' Damon Allen (QB) was named the Grey Cup's Most Valuable Player and Sean Fleming (K/P) was the Grey Cup's Most Valuable Canadian.

=== Playoff bracket ===
November 13 & 14: Division Semifinals
East
E3	Ottawa Rough Riders	10
E2	Hamilton Tiger-Cats	21
W3	Saskatchewan Roughriders	13
W2	Edmonton Eskimos	51
West
W4	BC Lions	9
W1	Calgary Stampeders	17

November 21: Division Finals
E2	Hamilton Tiger-Cats	19
E1	Winnipeg Blue Bombers	20
W2	Edmonton Eskimos	29
W1	Calgary Stampeders	15

November 28: 81st Grey Cup; McMahon Stadium (Calgary, AB)
E1	Winnipeg Blue Bombers	23
W2	Edmonton Eskimos	33

== CFL leaders ==
- CFL passing leaders
- CFL rushing leaders
- CFL receiving leaders

== 1993 CFL All-Stars ==
=== Offence ===
- QB – Doug Flutie, Calgary Stampeders
- FB – Sean Millington, BC Lions
- RB – Mike Richardson, Winnipeg Blue Bombers
- SB – Ray Elgaard, Saskatchewan Roughriders
- SB – Dave Sapunjis, Calgary Stampeders
- WR – David Williams, Winnipeg Blue Bombers
- WR – Rod Harris, Sacramento Gold Miners
- C – Rod Connop, Edmonton Eskimos
- OG – David Black, Winnipeg Blue Bombers
- OG – Rob Smith, BC Lions
- OT – Bruce Covernton, Calgary Stampeders
- OT – Chris Walby, Winnipeg Blue Bombers

=== Defence ===
- DT – Jearld Baylis, Saskatchewan Roughriders
- DT – Harald Hasselbach, Calgary Stampeders
- DE – Will Johnson, Calgary Stampeders
- DE – Tim Cofield, Hamilton Tiger-Cats
- LB – Elfrid Payton, Winnipeg Blue Bombers
- LB – Willie Pless, Edmonton Eskimos
- LB – John Motton, Hamilton Tiger-Cats
- CB – Karl Anthony, Calgary Stampeders
- CB – Barry Wilburn, Saskatchewan Roughriders
- DB – Don Wilson, Edmonton Eskimos
- DB – Darryl Sampson, Winnipeg Blue Bombers
- DS – Glen Suitor, Saskatchewan Roughriders

=== Special teams ===
- P – Bob Cameron, Winnipeg Blue Bombers
- K – Dave Ridgway, Saskatchewan Roughriders
- ST – Henry "Gizmo" Williams, Edmonton Eskimos

== 1993 Eastern All-Stars ==
=== Offence ===
- QB – Matt Dunigan, Winnipeg Blue Bombers
- FB – Chris Johnstone, Winnipeg Blue Bombers
- RB – Mike Richardson Winnipeg Blue Bombers
- SB – Gerald Wilcox, Winnipeg Blue Bombers
- SB – Jock Climie, Ottawa Rough Riders
- WR – David Williams, Winnipeg Blue Bombers
- WR – Stephen Jones, Ottawa Rough Riders
- C – Dave Vankoughnett, Winnipeg Blue Bombers
- OG – David Black, Winnipeg Blue Bombers
- OG – Denny Chronopoulos, Ottawa Rough Riders
- OT – Mike Graybill, Ottawa Rough Riders
- OT – Chris Walby, Winnipeg Blue Bombers

=== Defence ===
- DT – Lloyd Lewis, Winnipeg Blue Bombers
- DT – Stan Mikawos, Winnipeg Blue Bombers
- DE – John Kropke, Ottawa Rough Riders
- DE – Tim Cofield, Hamilton Tiger-Cats
- LB – Elfrid Payton, Winnipeg Blue Bombers
- LB – Angelo Snipes, Ottawa Rough Riders
- LB – John Motton, Hamilton Tiger-Cats
- CB – Kim Phillips, Winnipeg Blue Bombers
- CB – Donald Smith, Winnipeg Blue Bombers
- DB – Bobby Evans, Winnipeg Blue Bombers
- DB – Darryl Sampson, Winnipeg Blue Bombers
- S – Remi Trudel, Ottawa Rough Riders

=== Special teams ===
- P – Bob Cameron, Winnipeg Blue Bombers
- K – Troy Westwood, Winnipeg Blue Bombers
- ST – Michael Clemons, Toronto Argonauts

== 1993 Western All-Stars ==
=== Offence ===
- QB – Doug Flutie, Calgary Stampeders
- FB – Sean Millington, BC Lions
- RB – Mike Oliphant, Sacramento Gold Miners
- SB – Ray Elgaard, Saskatchewan Roughriders
- SB – Dave Sapunjis, Calgary Stampeders
- WR – Don Narcisse, Saskatchewan Roughriders
- WR – Rod Harris, Sacramento Gold Miners
- C – Rod Connop, Edmonton Eskimos
- OG – Rocco Romano, Calgary Stampeders
- OG – Rob Smith, BC Lions
- OT – Bruce Covernton, Calgary Stampeders
- OT – Jim Mills, BC Lions

=== Defence ===
- DT – Jearld Baylis, Saskatchewan Roughriders
- DT – Harald Hasselbach, Calgary Stampeders
- DE – Will Johnson, Calgary Stampeders
- DE – Bennie Goods, Edmonton Eskimos
- LB – Marvin Pope, Calgary Stampeders
- LB – Willie Pless, Edmonton Eskimos
- LB – O.J. Brigance, BC Lions
- CB – Karl Anthony, Calgary Stampeders
- CB – Barry Wilburn, Saskatchewan Roughriders
- DB – Don Wilson, Edmonton Eskimos
- DB – Glenn Rogers, Edmonton Eskimos
- DS – Glen Suitor, Saskatchewan Roughriders

=== Special teams ===
- P – Glenn Harper, Edmonton Eskimos
- K – Dave Ridgway, Saskatchewan Roughriders
- ST – Henry "Gizmo" Williams, Edmonton Eskimos

== 1993 CFL awards ==
- CFL's Most Outstanding Player Award – Doug Flutie (QB), Calgary Stampeders
- CFL's Most Outstanding Canadian Award – Dave Sapunjis (SB), Calgary Stampeders
- CFL's Most Outstanding Defensive Player Award – Jearld Baylis (DT), Saskatchewan Roughriders
- CFL's Most Outstanding Offensive Lineman Award – Chris Walby (OT), Winnipeg Blue Bombers
- CFL's Most Outstanding Rookie Award – Mike O'Shea (DT), Hamilton Tiger-Cats
- CFLPA's Outstanding Community Service Award – Mike "Pinball" Clemons (RB), Toronto Argonauts
- CFL's Coach of the Year – Wally Buono, Calgary Stampeders
- Commissioner's Award - Reg Wheeler, Hamilton Wildcats, help build the Canadian Football Hall of Fame.
