= Maurice Henry =

Maurice Henry may refer to:

- Maurice Henry (American football) (born 1967), American football linebacker
- Maurice Henry, Prince of Nassau-Hadamar (1626–1679)
