= 1993 Edmonton Eskimos season =

Canadian football team season

- General manager: Hugh Campbell
- Head coach: Ron Lancaster
- Home stadium: Commonwealth Stadium

Results
- Record: 12–6
- Division place: 2nd, West
- Playoffs: Won Grey Cup

Uniform

The 1993 Edmonton Eskimos finished in second place in the West Division with a 12–6 record and won the 81st Grey Cup.

== Offseason ==
=== CFL draft ===
Rd	Pick	Player	Position	School
1	4	Michael O'Shea	LB	Guelph
2	11	Brent Stucke	SB	Wilfrid Laurier
3	19	Albert Frederick	LB	Livingston
4	27	Scott McKenzie	K	Alberta
5	35	John Cutler	K	Alberta
6	43	Mark Tolbert	SB	Alberta
7	51	Jeff Benoit	RB	Mansfield

=== Schedule ===
Week	Date	Opponent	Results		Venue	Attendance
Week	Date	Opponent	Score	Record	Venue	Attendance
A	June 25	vs. Calgary Stampeders	L 8–22	0–1		36,553
B	June 30	at BC Lions	W 27–20	1–1		

== Regular season ==
=== Season standings ===
West Division
Pos	Team	Pld	W	L	T	PF	PA	PD	Pts	Div	Stk
1	Calgary Stampeders (Q)	18	15	3	0	646	418	228	30	7–3	L1
2	Edmonton Eskimos (Q)	18	12	6	0	507	372	135	24	7–3	W5
3	Saskatchewan Roughriders (Q)	18	11	7	0	511	495	16	22	5–5	W2
4	BC Lions (Q)	18	10	8	0	574	583	−9	20	3–7	L2
5	Sacramento Gold Miners	18	6	12	0	498	509	−11	12	3–7	W1

Source: "CFL.ca". Archived from the original on 2009-07-15.
(Q) Qualified for playoffs

=== Season schedule ===
Week	Game	Date	Opponent	Results		Venue	Attendance
Week	Game	Date	Opponent	Score	Record	Venue	Attendance
1	1	July 10	vs. Toronto Argonauts	W 38–8	1–0	Commonwealth Stadium	26,336
2	2	July 15	at Saskatchewan Roughriders	L 22–23	1–1	Taylor Field	17,566
3	3	July 21	vs. Saskatchewan Roughriders	W 35–3	2–1	Commonwealth Stadium	27,894
4	4	July 31	at Sacramento Gold Miners	W 43–11	3–1	Hornet Stadium	17,827
5	5	Aug 7	vs. BC Lions	L 23–39	3–2	Commonwealth Stadium	25,236
6	6	Aug 13	at Winnipeg Blue Bombers	L 11–53	3–3	Winnipeg Stadium	25,786
7	7	Aug 18	at Toronto Argonauts	W 45–14	4–3	SkyDome	20,563
8	8	Aug 25	vs. Hamilton Tiger-Cats	W 46–8	5–3	Commonwealth Stadium	24,356
9	9	Sept 2	vs. Sacramento Gold Miners	W 13–12	6–3	Commonwealth Stadium	37,042
9	10	Sept 6	at Calgary Stampeders	L 13–33	6–4	McMahon Stadium	38,205
10	11	Sept 10	vs. Calgary Stampeders	W 29–16	7–4	Commonwealth Stadium	54,324*
11	12	Sept 17	at Hamilton Tiger-Cats	L 10–34	7–5	Ivor Wynne Stadium	17,102
12	13	Sept 26	vs. Winnipeg Blue Bombers	L 14–52	7–6	Commonwealth Stadium	30,972
13	14	Oct 2	at Sacramento Gold Miners	W 34–13	8–6	Hornet Stadium	15,914
14	Bye						
15	15	Oct 16	vs. Ottawa Rough Riders	W 19–1	9–6	Commonwealth Stadium	25,140
16	16	Oct 22	at Ottawa Rough Riders	W 19–17	10–6	Frank Clair Stadium	19,580
17	17	Oct 29	at BC Lions	W 54–14	11–6	BC Place	35,674
18	18	Nov 7	vs. Calgary Stampeders	W 39–21	12–6	Commonwealth Stadium	23,536

*Top attendance in CFL

Total attendance: 274,836
Average attendance: 30,537 (50.8%)

== Playoffs ==
Round	Date	Opponent	Results		Venue	Attendance
Round	Date	Opponent	Score	Record	Venue	Attendance
Division Semi-Final	Nov 5	vs. Saskatchewan Roughriders	W 51–13	1–0		26,397
Division Final	Nov 12	at Calgary Stampeders	W 29–15	2–0		20,218
Grey Cup	Nov 19	vs. Winnipeg Blue Bombers	W 33–23	3–0		50,035

=== Grey Cup ===
Team	Q1	Q2	Q3	Q4	Total
Winnipeg Blue Bombers	0	10	7	6	23
Edmonton Eskimos	17	7	0	9	33

== Roster ==
1993 Edmonton Eskimos final roster
Quarterbacks: 9 Damon Allen; 16 Rickey Foggie; 15 Tom Muecke; Running backs: 33 Lucius Floyd; 22 Blake Marshall; 32 Michael Soles; 34 Brian Walling; Receivers: 4 Eddie Brown; 8 Wayde Butler; 87 Jay Christensen; 23 J. P. Izquierdo; 6 Ricky Jones; 31 Eric Mitchel; 7 Jim Sandusky; 2 Gizmo Williams	Offensive linemen: 57 Randy Ambrosie G; 61 Terris Chorney G/C; 67 Rod Connop C; 50 Blake Dermott T; 53 Mike Dumaresq G; 56 Steve Krupey G; 60 Chris Morris T; 51 Jeff Thomas T; Defensive linemen: 94 Michel Bourgeau NT; 40 Bennie Goods DE; 90 Leonard Johnson NT; 43 Jed Roberts DE; 91 Tony Woods DE; Special teams: 3 Sean Fleming K; 18 Glenn Harper P	Linebackers: 89 Leroy Blugh; 36 Bruce Dickson; 46 Malvin Hunter; 41 Errol Martin; 39 Willie Pless; 47 Larry Wruck; Defensive backs: 13 Ed Berry; 28 Trent Brown; 17 John Holland; 25 Morris Lolar; 10 Damion Lyons; 24 Danny Murphy; 14 Doug Parrish; 26 Glenn Rogers; 20 Don Wilson; Italics indicate American player
