= Bruce Covernton =

Canadian football player (1966–2024)

Profile
- Position: Tackle

Personal information
- Born: August 12, 1966; Morris, Manitoba, Canada
- Died: January 23, 2024 (aged 57); Calgary, Alberta, Canada
- Listed height: 6 ft 5 in (1.96 m)
- Listed weight: 292 lb (132 kg)

Career history
- 1992–1998: Calgary Stampeders

Awards and highlights
- 2× Grey Cup champion (1992, 1998); DeMarco–Becket Memorial Trophy (1993); Jackie Parker Trophy (1992); CFL All-Star (1993); 2× CFL West All-Star (1993, 1994)

Bruce Covernton (August 12, 1966 – January 23, 2024) was a Canadian professional football player who was a tackle for the Calgary Stampeders of the Canadian Football League (CFL). He was selected first overall by the Stampeders in the 1992 Canadian College Draft.

Covernton was first team All-American and All-Big Sky Conference at Weber State University. Bruce also attended the NFL Combine in 1991.

Covernton was voted the West's top rookie in 1992 and top offensive lineman in 1993. He twice earned division All-Star honours and was All-CFL in 1993. Covernton was part of the Grey Cup championship teams in 1992 and 1998.

Covernton was owner and CEO of Champion staffing company in Calgary and involved in many local charities.

Covernton died on January 23, 2024, at the age of 57.
