= 1993 Sacramento Gold Miners season =

- Owner: Fred Anderson
- General manager: Tom Huiskens
- Head coach: Kay Stephenson
- Home stadium: Hornet Stadium

Results
- Record: 6–12
- Division place: 5th, West
- Playoffs: Did not qualify

Uniform
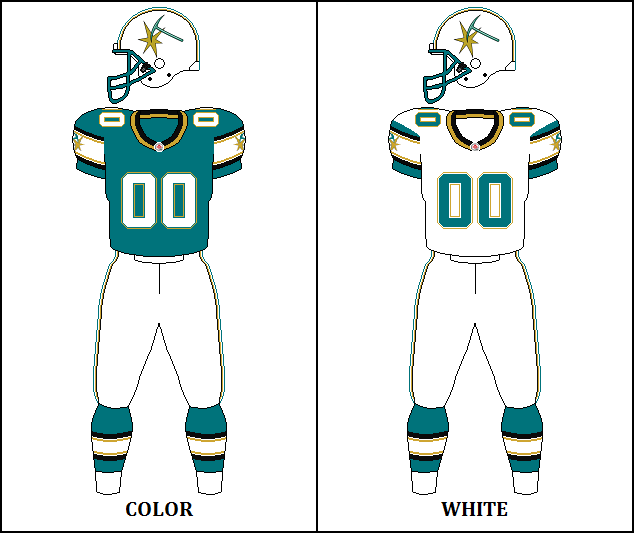

The 1993 Sacramento Gold Miners finished in fifth place in the West Division with a 6–12 record and missed the playoffs. In 1993, the Canadian Football League admitted its first U.S. franchise, the Sacramento Gold Miners (formerly the Sacramento Surge of the WLAF), in an attempt to broaden Canadian football's popular appeal and boost league revenues.

== Preseason ==
=== Schedule ===
Game	Date	Opponent	Results		Venue	Attendance
Game	Date	Opponent	Score	Record	Venue	Attendance
A	Thu, June 17	at Winnipeg Blue Bombers	W 21–15	1–0	Winnipeg Stadium	23,191
B	Sat, June 26	vs. BC Lions	W 29–20	2–0	Hornet Stadium	19,227

== Regular season ==
=== Season standings ===
West Division
Pos	Team	Pld	W	L	T	PF	PA	PD	Pts	Div	Stk
1	Calgary Stampeders (Q)	18	15	3	0	646	418	228	30	7–3	L1
2	Edmonton Eskimos (Q)	18	12	6	0	507	372	135	24	7–3	W5
3	Saskatchewan Roughriders (Q)	18	11	7	0	511	495	16	22	5–5	W2
4	BC Lions (Q)	18	10	8	0	574	583	−9	20	3–7	L2
5	Sacramento Gold Miners	18	6	12	0	498	509	−11	12	3–7	W1

Source: "CFL.ca". Archived from the original on July 15, 2009.
(Q) Qualified for playoffs

=== Schedule ===
Week	Game	Date	Opponent	Results		Venue	Attendance
Week	Game	Date	Opponent	Score	Record	Venue	Attendance
1	Bye						
2	1	Wed, July 7	at Ottawa Rough Riders	L 23–32	0–1	Frank Clair Stadium	23,916
2	2	Sat, July 10	at Hamilton Tiger-Cats	L 14–30	0–2	Ivor Wynne Stadium	20,307
3	3	Sat, July 17	vs. Calgary Stampeders	L 36–38	0–3	Hornet Stadium	20,082
4	4	Sat, July 24	vs. Saskatchewan Roughriders	W 37–26	1–3	Hornet Stadium	17,319
5	5	Sat, July 31	vs. Edmonton Eskimos	L 11–43	1–4	Hornet Stadium	17,827
6	6	Thu, Aug 5	at Toronto Argonauts	L 35–37	1–5	Skydome	28,612
7	7	Sat, Aug 14	vs. Hamilton Tiger-Cats	W 46–10	2–5	Hornet Stadium	14,656
8	8	Sat, Aug 21	vs. Winnipeg Blue Bombers	L 18–30	2–6	Hornet Stadium	15,509
9	9	Fri, Aug 27	at Saskatchewan Roughriders	L 23–26	2–7	Taylor Field	33,032
10	10	Thu, Sept 2	at Edmonton Eskimos	L 12–13	2–8	Commonwealth Stadium	37,042
11	11	Sat, Sept 11	vs. Ottawa Rough Riders	W 47–15	3–8	Hornet Stadium	16,510
12	12	Sun, Sept 19	at Saskatchewan Roughriders	L 20–27	3–9	Taylor Field	25,367
13	Bye						
14	13	Sat, Oct 2	vs. Edmonton Eskimos	L 13–34	3–10	Hornet Stadium	15,914
15	14	Fri, Oct 8	at BC Lions	W 27–23	4–10	BC Place	30,615
16	15	Fri, Oct 15	at Winnipeg Blue Bombers	L 26–33	4–11	Winnipeg Stadium	27,451
17	16	Sat, Oct 23	vs. Toronto Argonauts	W 38–24	5–11	Hornet Stadium	27,451
18	17	Sat, Oct 30	at Calgary Stampeders	L 8–41	5–12	McMahon Stadium	26,015
19	18	Sat, Nov 6	vs. BC Lions	W 64–27	6–12	Hornet Stadium	18,748

== Roster ==
1993 Sacramento Gold Miners final roster
Quarterbacks: 18 David Archer; 12 Kerwin Bell; 13 Charles Puleri; Running backs: 20 Troy Mills; 33 Mike Oliphant; 27 Mike Pringle; Receivers: 80 Willie Bouyer; 8 Titus Dixon; 5 Tre Everett; 81 Rod Harris; 83 Byron Jackson; 89 Joe Johnson; 86 Carl Parker; 87 James Pruitt; 82 Myron Wise	Offensive linemen: 52 David Diaz-Infante G; 54 Bob Dressel T/C; 53 Chris Dyko T; 62 Garry Frank G; 66 Steve Gabbard T; 61 Jim Jennings G; 63 Mike Kiselak C; 68 Ernie Rogers G/T; 51 Ron Shipley G; Defensive linemen: 79 Vance Hammond DT; 98 Greg Joelson DT; 99 Emanuel King DE; 73 Mark Ledbetter DE; 75 Chris Thieneman DT; 92 David Westbrooks DT; 71 Brent White DE; 91 Robb White DT	Linebackers: 44 Hurlie Brown; 95 Paschall Davis; 50 Corian Freeman; 97 Maurice Miller; 94 Curtis Moore; 90 Leonard Nelson; Defensive backs: 23 Walter Bailey; 22 Darrick Davis; 17 Charles Franks; 39 Bobby Humphery; 27 Junior Robinson; 9 Kip Texada; 24 Jason Wallace; 7 John Wiley; Special teams: 3 Jim Crouch K/P; 16 Pete Gardere P; Italics indicate American player
