= Tim Cofield =

American football player (born 1963)

No. 54, 90, 50
- Positions: Linebacker, Defensive end

Personal information
- Born: May 18, 1963 (age 63); Murfreesboro, North Carolina, U.S.
- Listed height: 6 ft 2 in (1.88 m)
- Listed weight: 243 lb (110 kg)

Career information
- High school: Murfreesboro (NC)
- College: Elizabeth City State

Career history
- 1986–1988: Kansas City Chiefs
- 1989: New York Jets
- 1989: Buffalo Bills
- 1991: Los Angeles Raiders*
- 1991–1992: Calgary Stampeders
- 1993–1994: Hamilton Tiger-Cats
- 1995: Memphis Mad Dogs
- 1996: Toronto Argonauts
- * Offseason or practice squad member only

Awards and highlights
- Grey Cup champion (1992); 2× James P. McCaffrey Trophy (1994, 1995); 3× CFL All-Star (1993, 1994, 1995); 2× CFL East All-Star (1993, 1994)
- Stats at Pro Football Reference

Tim Cofield (born May 18, 1963) is an American former professional football player who was a linebacker for four seasons in the National Football League (NFL) for the Kansas City Chiefs, Buffalo Bills, and New York Jets. He later played six seasons in the Canadian Football League (CFL) as a defensive end for four teams.
