= Matt Dunigan =

American football player (born 1960)

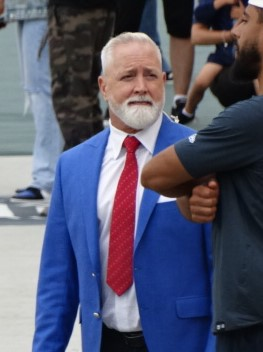
- Dunigan in 2022

No. 16
- Position: Quarterback

Personal information
- Born: December 6, 1960 (age 65); Lakewood, Ohio, U.S.
- Listed height: 5 ft 11 in (1.80 m)
- Listed weight: 199 lb (90 kg)

Career information
- High school: Lake Highlands (Dallas, Texas)
- College: Louisiana Tech
- NFL draft: 1983: undrafted

Career history

Playing
- 1983–1987: Edmonton Eskimos
- 1988–1989: BC Lions
- 1990–1991: Toronto Argonauts
- 1992–1994: Winnipeg Blue Bombers
- 1995: Birmingham Barracudas
- 1996: Hamilton Tiger-Cats

Coaching
- 2004: Calgary Stampeders (HC) (GM)

Awards and highlights
- 2× Grey Cup champion (1987, 1991); Jeff Russel Memorial Trophy (1993); Tom Pate Memorial Award (1989); 3× CFL All-Star (1985, 1988, 1995); 2× CFL West All-Star (1985, 1988); 2× CFL West All-Star (1993, 1994); CFL South All-Star (1995)

Career CFL statistics
- Passing: 3,057/5,476
- Passing %: 55.8%
- Passing yardage: 43,857 (Avg: 8.0)
- Passing TDs: 303
- Interceptions: 211
- Canadian Football Hall of Fame (Class of 2006)

Mathew A. Dunigan (born December 6, 1960) is an American broadcaster and former professional football player and executive. He was a Canadian Football League (CFL) sportscaster for Canadian sports television channel TSN. Dunigan is a former quarterback, coach, and executive in the CFL. In 2006, Dunigan joined the Canadian Football Hall of Fame, and was voted one of the CFL's Top 50 players (#39) of the league's modern era by Canadian sports network TSN.

In 2008, he was named the host of Road Grill, a Canadian barbecue cooking series on Food Network Canada.

== Early life and college ==
Although born in Ohio, Dunigan was raised in Dallas, Texas, attended Lake Highlands High School and grew up admiring Dallas Cowboys quarterback Roger Staubach. A member of an athletically inclined family, he enrolled at Louisiana Tech University in 1979, while Tech was classified as an NCAA Division I-A program. In 1982, Dunigan's senior season, Louisiana Tech began play in Division I-AA.

In his freshman year, Dunigan played in eight games behind incumbent starting quarterback Mark Buchanan. Dunigan was named the starting quarterback for the 1980 season by newly hired head coach Billy Brewer. Dunigan's best collegiate season was in 1982 as a senior, going 222–413 for 2,843 yards, 23 touchdowns and 15 interceptions. Dunigan led the Bulldogs to a 9–2 regular season record, an undefeated 5–0 record in the Southland Conference, a #2 ranking in The Sports Network poll, and the program's first ever berth in the Division I-AA playoffs. After a 38–3 quarterfinal win at home against South Carolina State, the Bulldogs were eliminated from the playoffs in a 17–0 semifinal loss at home to Delaware.

In 44 total games at Louisiana Tech, Dunigan had completed 550 of 1,103 pass attempts for 7,010 yards with 40 touchdowns against 50 interceptions. Dunigan was inducted into the Louisiana Tech University Athletic Hall of Fame in 2011.

=== Statistics ===
Louisiana Tech Bulldogs
Season	Games		Passing							Rushing			
Season	GP	Record	Cmp	Att	Pct	Yds	TD	Int	Rtg	Att	Yds	Avg	TD
1979	11	3–8	26	59	44.1	330	2	6	81.9	42	31	0.7	1
1980	11	5–6	149	313	47.6	1,939	9	13	100.8	117	-73	-0.6	4
1981	11	4–6–1	153	318	48.1	1,898	6	16	94.4	107	54	0.5	2
1982	11	9–2	222	413	53.7	2,843	23	15	122.7	114	113	0.9	2
Career	44	21–22–1	550	1,103	7,010	49.8	40	50	106.1	380	125	0.3	9

== Professional career ==
=== Edmonton Eskimos ===
Dunigan broke into the CFL in 1983 with the Edmonton Eskimos. In his rookie season, he backed up Warren Moon.

Prior to the 1984 CFL Season, Moon left for the NFL's Houston Oilers and the Eskimos became Dunigan's team. That year, he was Edmonton's nominee as Most Outstanding Player. Dunigan was fourth in the CFL in passing, fourth in rushing, and set the CFL record for rushing yardage by a quarterback in a season (732), a record that has since been eclipsed.

In 1985, Dunigan was nominated as Edmonton Most Outstanding Player for the second consecutive year, and was a CFL West All-Star and a CFL All-Star.

He led the Eskimos to back-to-back Grey Cup appearances in 1986 and 1987, winning in 1987. He had to watch most of the game from the bench due to injury. His backup during this time was another CFL legend in the making, Damon Allen.

After the 75th Grey Cup victory, Dunigan tried pursuing a Major League Baseball career. He worked with a scout from the California Angels, then showed up in Florida during spring training. He was hoping to catch on with the Montreal Expos. He was signed to a Class A contract, but then released on the last day.

=== BC Lions ===
While Edmonton held on to his rights, they traded him to the British Columbia Lions in June 1988 for Jim Sandusky and future considerations. The future considerations that completed the trade in January 1989 included Jeff Braswell, Gregg Stumon, Reggie Taylor, Andre Francis, and BC's first round draft choice in the 1989 CFL College Draft, Leroy Blugh. Dunigan led the Lions third place in the West Division with a 10-8 record. BC defeated Saskatchewan 42-18 in the West Semi-Final. In the West Final, BC beat the team that traded Dunigan in June, the Edmonton Eskimos, 37-19. This was the first time the Eskimos had ever lost a playoff game at Commonwealth Stadium. In the Grey Cup game, BC lost to Winnipeg 22–21. BC had a chance to win the game late in the fourth quarter. Winnipeg was leading 22–19, and BC was scrimmaging at Winnipeg's 7-yard line. Dunigan attempted a pass into the endzone, but it was deflected by Delbert Fowler, and intercepted by Michael Gray.

In 1989, Dunigan was for the first time on a losing team, and a team that missed the playoffs. BC fell to 7–11. Individually, he threw for a then-career-high 27 touchdowns, and his first 4000 yard season (4,509). He was nominated as BC's Most Outstanding Player. However, new management came in, and Dunigan was on the move again.

=== Toronto Argonauts ===
In March 1990, Dunigan was traded to the Toronto Argonauts for Rick Johnson, Willie Pless, Tony Visco, Emanuel Tolbert, Todd Wiseman, and Jearld Baylis. When he arrived in Toronto, they made the playoffs in 1990, but lost in the Division Final.

However, 1991 proved to be a memorable year for the CFL and Argonauts. Canadian actor and comedian John Candy, along with hockey great Wayne Gretzky, and Los Angeles Kings owner Bruce McNall purchased the Argos. Toronto then made noise by signing Notre Dame receiver Raghib "Rocket" Ismail. The Rocket, along with Dunigan and running back Michael "Pinball" Clemons led Toronto to a 13–5 record. After a first round bye, the Argos won against Winnipeg in front of a packed out SkyDome, and advanced to the Grey Cup. However, in that playoff game, Dunigan broke his collarbone. He was able to throw the length of a hotel ballroom after doctors deadened his shoulder. In minus 19 degree weather, he threw two touchdowns and won his second Grey Cup. Dunigan was granted free agency status in February 1992.

=== Winnipeg Blue Bombers ===
In June 1992, Dunigan signed with the Winnipeg Blue Bombers, where he spent the next three years. The Bombers went to the Grey Cup in 1992, only to lose to the Calgary Stampeders. In the game, Dunigan was 6 of 19 for 47 yards passing, and could not generate any points. He was replaced late in the game by Danny McManus who generated 10 points.

The 1993 season was a very productive season for Dunigan. He was a CFL East All-Star, tied for the CFL lead in rushing touchdowns (11), was Winnipeg's nominee as Most Outstanding Player, the East Division Most Outstanding Player, and ultimately the runner-up for the league award to Doug Flutie. He broke the Blue Bomber record by throwing for 36 touchdowns. Winnipeg finished 14–4. Unfortunately, Dunigan tore his Achilles tendon in the team's sixteenth game of the season, against the Sacramento Gold Miners, and missed the rest of the season. He was replaced by Sammy Garza, who guided Winnipeg to the Grey Cup. Dunigan watched the game on crutches. Winnipeg lost 33–23 to Edmonton.

In 1994, Dunigan returned from his achilles tendon injury. On July 14, he made pro football history when he passed for 713 yards in a 50–35 victory over his former team, the Eskimos. He was nominated as an Eastern All-Star for the second consecutive season. Dunigan was granted free agency status in February 1995.

=== Birmingham Barracudas ===
In 1995, the CFL was entering its third season of US expansion, and added two teams: the Memphis Mad Dogs and the Birmingham Barracudas. Memphis tried pursuing Dunigan, but eventually landed Damon Allen. Dunigan landed in Birmingham in April. This season was Dunigan's best season statistically, as he passed for 4,911 yards and 34 touchdowns. He was the team's Most Outstanding Player nominee.

In the team’s eighth game of the season, Birmingham defeated the Calgary Stampeders in Calgary 31-28. Dunigan threw a touchdown to Eddie Britton with 9 seconds remaining in the game. This game ended Calgary’s CFL record 27 regular season game home winning and unbeaten streaks dating back to 1992. Also In this game, Dunigan moved past Tom Clements into second place all-time in CFL passing yardage.

In the home finale against Edmonton, Dunigan broke his throwing hand and watched the rest of the season, including the playoffs, from the sidelines. The Barracudas lost in the playoffs 52–9 to the San Antonio Texans.

All the U.S.-based teams folded except for the Grey Cup champion, Baltimore Stallions, who relocated to Montreal. As a result of the Barracudas folding, Dunigan was granted free agency status in February 1996.

=== Hamilton Tiger-Cats ===
In May 1996, Dunigan signed a two-year contract worth more than $1 million with the Hamilton Tiger-Cats. Hamilton started 4–1, including Dunigan's 100th win as a starting quarterback in the team's fifth game against BC. In the sixth game of the season, Hamilton was hosting BC, and Dunigan left the game with injury. In the first quarter, he endured hits from Reggie Carthon and Shelton Quarles, and was forced from the game with a concussion. Dunigan missed the rest of the season due to injury.

=== Retirement ===
Dunigan officially announced his retirement on February 18, 1997. His retirement was prompted by chronic head injuries.

Upon retirement, Dunigan was the only quarterback to lead four different teams to the Grey Cup game (Edmonton, BC, Toronto, Winnipeg). He also finished second to Ron Lancaster in the following all-time regular season passing categories:

- Touchdowns (303)
- Yards (43,857)
- Attempts (5,476)
- Completions (3,057)

He was only the second quarterback, after Lancaster, to reach 100 regular season wins as a starting quarterback. Dunigan ranked fifth in yards rushing by a quarterback (5,031).

In 2006, Dunigan was voted one of the CFL's Top 50 players (#39) of the league's modern era by Canadian sports network TSN. Dunigan was also elected into the Canadian Football Hall of Fame in 2006.

== Professional statistics ==
=== Regular season ===
Year	Team	GP	GS	ATT	COMP	YD	TD	INT	RUSH	YD	TD
1983	Edmonton	16	0	26	14	239	1	2	4	23	0
1984	Edmonton	13	13	412	220	3,273	21	19	89	732	9
1985	Edmonton	14	14	405	242	3,410	19	22	113	737	9
1986	Edmonton	18	17	485	275	3,648	25	14	118	594	4
1987	Edmonton	13	12	326	175	2,823	21	19	51	287	4
1988	BC	17	17	471	268	3,776	26	22	97	501	6
1989	BC	18	18	597	331	4,509	27	20	70	397	10
1990	Toronto	8	7	262	144	2,028	17	14	48	218	7
1991	Toronto	8	7	196	121	2,011	16	10	34	190	2
1992	Winnipeg	16	12	411	205	2,857	17	15	42	238	3
1993	Winnipeg	16	16	600	334	4,682	36	18	84	517	11
1994	Winnipeg	11	11	431	252	3,965	31	16	42	226	4
1995	Birmingham	18	15	643	362	4,911	34	16	38	213	7
1996	Hamilton	6	6	211	114	1,725	12	4	20	158	1
TOTAL		192	166	5,476	3,057	43,857	303	211	850	5,031	77

=== Playoffs ===
Year & game	Team	GP	GS	ATT	COMP	YD	TD	INT	RUSH	YD	TD
1983 West Semi-Final	Edmonton	1	0	5	2	52	0	0	0	-	-
1984 West Semi-Final	Edmonton	1	1	30	19	264	1	3	3	5	1
1985 West Semi-Final	Edmonton	1	0	0	-	-	-	-	0	-	-
1986 West Semi-Final	Edmonton	1	1	29	20	238	0	0	15	113	2
1986 West Final	Edmonton	1	1	17	11	266	3	1	10	73	0
1987 West Semi-Final	Edmonton	1	1	31	15	280	1	3	4	14	0
1987 West Final	Edmonton	1	1	26	13	287	2	1	4	33	0
1988 West Semi-Final	BC	1	1	29	21	205	1	1	0	-	-
1988 West Final	BC	1	1	33	16	230	3	2	3	15	1
1990 East Semi-Final	Toronto	0	-	-	-	-	-	-	-	-	-
1990 East Final	Toronto	0	-	-	-	-	-	-	-	-	-
1991 East Final	Toronto	1	1	22	11	188	3	1	2	24	0
1992 East Final	Winnipeg	1	1	24	11	197	1	0	3	22	0
1993 East Final	Winnipeg	0	-	-	-	-	-	-	-	-	-
1994 East Semi-Final	Winnipeg	1	1	38	21	285	1	0	2	10	0
1994 East Final	Winnipeg	1	1	35	15	187	0	1	4	15	0
1995 South Semi-Final	Birmingham	1	0	0	-	-	-	-	0	-	-
1996 East Semi-Final	Hamilton	0	-	-	-	-	-	-	-	-	-

=== Grey Cup ===
Year	Team	GP	GS	ATT	COMP	YD	TD	INT	RUSH	YD	TD
1986	Edmonton	1	1	26	11	158	0	1	7	27	0
1987	Edmonton	1	1	12	8	104	0	1	3	18	0
1988	BC	1	1	32	14	196	1	2	7	49	0
1991	Toronto	1	1	29	12	142	2	0	7	44	0
1992	Winnipeg	1	1	19	6	47	0	0	2	9	0
1993	Winnipeg	0	-	-	-	-	-	-	-	-	-

== Post-football career ==
=== Coaching career ===
In February 1997, Dunigan was named the offensive coordinator for Valdosta State University's football program. He spent the 1997 and 1998 seasons in this position.

In 2004, the Calgary Stampeders hired Dunigan to be their general manager and head coach. In July, he assumed the role of offensive co-ordinator after he fired John Jenkins. After a disappointing 4–14 season, Dunigan was fired.

=== Broadcasting career ===
During his playing career, when his team was not playing in the Grey Cup, Dunigan was an analyst for CFL on CBC. This included 1989 and 1994. He also served as a colour commentator for a 1993 West Semi-Final game, Saskatchewan at Edmonton. From 1999 to 2003 and 2005 to 2024, Dunigan was a studio analyst and colour commentator for CFL on TSN.

=== Other endeavours ===
In 2006, on a dare from his family, Dunigan auditioned for the position as host of a barbecue TV series Road Grill, which premièred in 2008 with him as host. He has also become a cookbook author, using recipes based on the show.

Dunigan is outspoken about the dangerous effect of concussions. He has suffered from memory problems, speech difficulties, balance issues, and memory loss from the numerous concussions he suffered during his playing career.

== CFL coaching record ==
Team	Year	Regular season							Postseason
Team	Year	Won	Lost	Ties	Win %	Finish	Won	Lost	Result
CGY	2004	4	14	0	.222	5th in West Division	–	–	Missed playoffs

== See also ==
- List of gridiron football quarterbacks passing statistics
