= 1990 Independence Bowl =

1990 Poulan/Weed Eater Independence Bowl
Maryland Terrapins	Louisiana Tech Bulldogs
(6–5)	(8–3)
ACC	Independent
34	34
Head coach: Joe Krivak	Head coach: Joe Raymond Peace
	1	2	3	4	Total
Maryland	14	0	6	14	34
Louisiana Tech	0	14	14	6	34
- Date: December 15, 1990
- Season: 1990
- Stadium: Independence Stadium
- Location: Shreveport, Louisiana
- MVP: RB Michael Richardson, La. Tech (Offensive); LB Lorenza Baker, La. Tech (Defensive)
- Attendance: 48,325
- Payout: US$1,200,000

United States TV coverage
- Network: Mizlou

Maryland and Louisiana Tech played to the only tie in Independence Bowl history as the Terrapins used a 14-6 fourth-quarter scoring advantage to tie. Tech running back Michael Richardson rushed for 81 yards and two touchdowns to earn offensive outstanding player honors. Louisiana Tech linebacker Lorenza Baker of Haughton earned outstanding defensive player honors.

== Invitation ==
Baylor University, then a member of the Southwest Conference, was extended an invitation to play in the 1990 Poulan Weed-Eater Independence Bowl before the last game of the season versus Texas. Coach Grant Teaff declined the invitation because the Bears still had an outside chance at the conference championship and an appearance in the Cotton Bowl. The Bears lost to Texas and did not play in a bowl game that season, despite finishing 6-4-1.

== Game summary ==
=== Scoring summary ===
Scoring summary

Quarter	Time	Drive			Team	Scoring information	Score	
Quarter	Time	Plays	Yards	TOP	Team	Scoring information	Maryland	La. Tech
1	11:59	6	24	2:06	Maryland	Troy Jackson 1-yard touchdown run, Dan DeArmas kick good	7	0
1	5:06	13	78	4:55	Maryland	Troy Jackson 2-yard touchdown run, Dan DeArmas kick good	14	0
2	8:30	10	74	4:32	La. Tech	Mike Richardson 5-yard touchdown run, Chris Boniol kick good	14	7
2	0:17	6	31	2:07	La. Tech	Jason Davis 3-yard touchdown run, Chris Boniol kick good	14	14
3	10:35	7	37	2:44	La. Tech	Mike Richardson 1-yard touchdown run, Chris Boniol kick good	14	21
3	7:44	7	80	2:51	Maryland	Troy Jackson 11-yard touchdown run, kick no good (miss right)	20	21
3	5:52	4	31	1:39	La. Tech	Bobby Slaughter 7-yard touchdown reception from Gene Johnson, Chris Boniol kick good	20	28
4	13:52	11	38	4:17	La. Tech	36-yard field goal by Chris Boniol	20	31
4	11:20	5	77	2:26	Maryland	Mark Mason 28-yard touchdown reception from Scott Zolak, Dan DeArmas kick good	27	31
4	0:52	6	52	1:58	Maryland	Barry Johnson 15-yard touchdown reception from Scott Zolak, Dan DeArmas kick good	34	31
4	0:00	6	28	0:44	La. Tech	29-yard field goal by Chris Boniol	34	34
"TOP" = time of possession. For other American football terms, see Glossary of American football.							34	34

=== Statistics ===
	1	2	3	4	Total
Terrapins	14	0	6	14	34
Bulldogs	0	14	14	6	34

Statistics	Maryland	La. Tech
First downs	25	16
Total offense, yards	404	306
Rushes-yards (net)	39–150	47–191
Passing yards (net)	254	115
Passes, Comp-Att-Int	18–29–3	11–18–1
Time of Possession	28:46	31:14

Team	Category	Player	Statistics
Maryland	Passing	Scott Zolak	17/28, 215 yds, 2 TD, 3 INT
Maryland	Rushing	Mark Mason	15 car, 93 yds
Maryland	Receiving	Barry Johnson	5 rec, 107 yds, 1 TD
La. Tech	Passing	Gene Johnson	7/8, 70 yds, 1 TD
La. Tech	Rushing	Mike Richardson	27 car, 81 yds, 2 TD
La. Tech	Receiving	Bobby Slaughter	5 rec, 68 yds, 1 TD
