= Tyrone Shavers =

American football player (born 1968)

No. 28, 87
- Positions: Wide receiver, Slotback

Personal information
- Born: February 9, 1968 (age 58); Texarkana, Texas, U.S.
- Listed height: 6 ft 3 in (1.91 m)
- Listed weight: 210 lb (95 kg)

Career information
- High school: Liberty-Eylau (Texarkana)
- College: Tyler JC (1986–1987); Lamar (1988–1989)
- NFL draft: 1990: 6th round, 142nd overall pick

Career history
- Phoenix Cardinals (1990)*; Cleveland Browns (1990–1992); Green Bay Packers (1993)*; Ottawa Rough Riders (1993–1994)
- * Offseason or practice squad member only

Career NFL statistics
- Games played: 1
- Stats at Pro Football Reference

Career CFL statistics
- Games played: 5
- Receptions: 7
- Receiving yards: 79
- Stats at CFL.ca

Pernell Tyrone Shavers (born February 9, 1968) is an American former professional football player who was a wide receiver for the Cleveland Browns of the National Football League (NFL) and a slotback for the Ottawa Rough Riders of the Canadian Football League (CFL). He played college football for the Tyler Apaches and Lamar Cardinals.

== Early life ==
Shavers was born on February 9, 1968, in Texarkana, Texas. He attended Liberty-Eylau High School in Texarkana. On National Signing Day, Shavers committed to play college football at Tyler Junior College.

== College career ==
Shavers played college football for the Tyler Apaches from 1986 to 1987 and Lamar Cardinals from 1988 to 1989. He played two seasons at Tyler, where he earned honorable mention All-TJCFC honors in 1987. on December 14, 1987, Shavers signed to play football at Lamar University. He finished his career with 68 receptions for 809 yards and 11 touchdowns.

== Professional career ==
=== Phoenix Cardinals ===
Shavers was selected in the sixth round, with the 142nd overall selection, by the Phoenix Cardinals in the 1990 NFL draft. On August 27, he was waived by the team.

=== Cleveland Browns ===
On October 3, 1990, Shavers was signed to the practice squad of the Cleveland Browns. On March 12, 1991, he was re-signed by the team. On August 26, Shavers was released but was re-signed to the practice squad the following day. On December 21, he was elevated to the active roster and played in his first game against the Pittsburgh Steelers the next day. Shavers re-signed with the team in the 1992 offseason. On August 25, he was released by the Browns.

=== Green Bay Packers ===
On April 26, 1993, Shavers signed with the Green Bay Packers. On June 3, he was waived by the team.

=== Ottawa Rough Riders ===
On August 18, 1993, Shavers signed with the Ottawa Rough Riders of the Canadian Football League (CFL). He played in five games and had seven catches for 79 yards. On June 13, 1994, Shavers was released by the team.
