= Karl Anthony =

American gridiron football player (born 1967)

Profile
- Position: Defensive back

Personal information
- Born: March 14, 1967 (age 59); New Iberia, Louisiana, U.S.

Career information
- College: Southwest Missouri State

Career history
- 1990–1993: Calgary Stampeders
- 1994–1995: Baltimore Stallions

Awards and highlights
- 2× Grey Cup champion (1992, 1995); Grey Cup MVP (1994); CFL All-Star (1993); CFL East All-Star (1993)

Karl Anthony (born March 14, 1967) is an American former professional football player who was a defensive back in the Canadian Football League (CFL). He was a CFL All-Star with the Calgary Stampeders in 1993. He won a Grey Cup championship with the Baltimore Stallions in 1995 and was named the Grey Cup Most Valuable Player (MVP) in 1994.

== Career ==
Anthony played his college football at Southwest Missouri State University and first played professionally for three years with the Calgary Stampeders, where he was an all-star in 1993. In 1994, he moved to the Baltimore Stallions he won the Grey Cup's Most Valuable Player in a losing cause against the British Columbia Lions. He helped Baltimore win the Grey Cup in 1995 against his old team, the Calgary Stampeders.
