= David Black (Canadian football) =

Canadian football player (born 1962)

Profile
- Position: Offensive lineman

Personal information
- Born: April 13, 1962 (age 64); Oshawa, Ontario, Canada

Career information
- College: Wilfrid Laurier
- CFL draft: 1984: 3rd round, 20th overall pick

Career history
- 1985–1996: Winnipeg Blue Bombers
- 1995: Ottawa Rough Riders

Awards and highlights
- 2× Grey Cup champion (1988, 1990); CFL All-Star (1993); 3× CFL East All-Star (1989, 1993, 1994)

David Black (born April 13, 1962) is a former offensive lineman in the Canadian Football League (CFL).

He played for the Winnipeg Blue Bombers from 1985 to 1996 and spent a portion of the 1995 season with the Ottawa Rough Riders. Black was a CFL all-star in 1993 and a CFL Eastern all-star in 1989, 1993 and 1994. His most notable performance was in the game where Matt Dunigan threw for 713 yards against the Edmonton Eskimos in which Black was recognized by the CFL as 'Offensive Lineman of the Week'. He attended Wilfrid Laurier University from 1983 to 1985. Black also attended Michigan State University for a brief period of time. In 2004, Black was inducted into the Winnipeg Blue Bombers Hall of Fame.

He was traded in 1995 from the Winnipeg Blue Bombers to the Ottawa Rough Riders where he spent three months of the season and was soon traded back to Winnipeg. Then soon after coming back Black retired.
