= 1993 Toronto Argonauts season =

CFL team season

- General manager: Mike McCarthy – (1–9) Bob O'Billovich – (2–6
- Head coach: Dennis Meyer – (1–9) Bob O'Billovich – (2–6)
- Home stadium: SkyDome

Results
- Record: 3–15
- Division place: 4th, East
- Playoffs: did not qualify

Uniform

The 1993 Toronto Argonauts finished in fourth place in the East Division with a 3–15 record and failed to make the playoffs, ending up just one win behind playoff bound Ottawa.

== Standings ==
East Division
Pos	Team	Pld	W	L	T	PF	PA	PD	Pts	Div	Stk
1	Winnipeg Blue Bombers (C, Q)	18	14	4	0	646	421	225	28	7–1	W6
2	Hamilton Tiger-Cats (Q)	18	6	12	0	316	567	−251	12	4–4	L3
3	Ottawa Rough Riders (Q)	18	4	14	0	387	517	−130	8	3–5	W1
4	Toronto Argonauts	18	3	15	0	390	593	−203	6	2–6	L5

Source: "CFL.ca". Archived from the original on 2009-07-15.
(C) First round bye; (Q) Qualified for playoffs

== Schedule ==
Week	Game	Date	Opponent	Results		Venue	Attendance
Week	Game	Date	Opponent	Score	Record	Venue	Attendance
1	1	July 10	at Edmonton Eskimos	L 8–38	0–1	Commonwealth Stadium	26,336
2	2	July 14	vs. BC Lions	L 27–40	0–2	SkyDome	26,759
3	3	July 22	vs. Hamilton Tiger-Cats	L 9–25	0–3	SkyDome	27,373
4	4	July 28	at Calgary Stampeders	L 36–39	0–4	McMahon Stadium	25,510
4	5	July 31	at Saskatchewan Roughriders	L 17–36	0–5	Taylor Field	18,212
5	6	Aug 5	vs. Sacramento Gold Miners	W 37–35	1–5	SkyDome	28,612
6	7	Aug 12	at BC Lions	L 38–55	1–6	BC Place Stadium	24,691
7	8	Aug 18	vs. Edmonton Eskimos	L 14–45	1–7	SkyDome	20,563
8	9	Aug 26	vs. Ottawa Rough Riders	L 25–26	1–8	SkyDome	21,327
9	10	Sept 6	at Hamilton Tiger-Cats	L 21–23	1–9	Ivor Wynne Stadium	21,762
10	Bye						
11	11	Sept 19	vs. Winnipeg Blue Bombers	W 35–26	2–9	SkyDome	28,915
12	12	Sept 25	at Ottawa Rough Riders	L 22–30	2–10	Frank Clair Stadium	24,631
13	13	Oct 3	vs. Ottawa Rough Riders	W 17–16	3–10	SkyDome	24,089
14	14	Oct 11	at Hamilton Tiger-Cats	L 20–28	3–11	Ivor Wynne Stadium	18,425
15	15	Oct 18	vs. Calgary Stampeders	L 7–51	3–12	SkyDome	21,023
16	16	Oct 23	at Sacramento Gold Miners	L 24–38	3–13	Hornet Stadium	16,242
17	17	Oct 31	vs. Saskatchewan Roughriders	L 23–30	3–14	SkyDome	29,348
18	18	Nov 7	at Winnipeg Blue Bombers	L 10–12	3–15	Winnipeg Stadium	22,287

== Roster ==
1993 Toronto Argonauts final roster
Quarterbacks: 1 Tracy Ham; 11 Bret Johnson; 10 Reggie Slack; Running backs: 31 Michael Clemons; 26 Warren Hudson; 23 Pat Jackson; 34 Lorne King; 32 Dwight Richards; Receivers: 87 Darrick Branch; 82 Andre Brown; 89 Robert Clark; 84 Bob Gordon; 81 Manny Hazard; 88 Paul Masotti; 86 Andrew Murray; 80 Wally Zatylny	Offensive linemen: 63 Francois Belanger T/G; 61 Chris Green G; 64 Peter Partchenko G; 66 Steve Rodehutskors T; 54 Blaine Schmidt C; 59 Pierre Vercheval G/C; 65 Ken Whitney T; 68 Kari Yli-Renko T; Defensive linemen: 99 Mike Campbell DT; 35 Bruce Elliott DE; 70 Harold Hallman DT; 77 Rodney Harding DT; 90 Leonard Johnson DT; 75 Keith Powe DE; 33 Leroy Smith DE; Special teams: 4 Lance Chomyc K/P; 15 Wayne Lammle P/K	Linebackers: 73 Ken Benson; 37 Keith Castello; 79 Reggie Clark; 39 Mark Houlder; 36 Don Moen; Defensive backs: 28 John Hardy; 27 Darren Hughes; 29 Enis Jackson; 21 Tahaun Lewis; 16 Brian McCurdy; 18 George Nimako; 2 Reggie Pleasant; 5 Andrew Thomas; 17 Dave Van Belleghem; 6 Kevin Whitley; Injured list: 8 Hank Ilesic P/K; 12 Mike Kerrigan QB; 67 Chris Schultz T; Italics indicate International player

== Awards and honours ==
- CFLPA's Most Outstanding Community Service Award – Michael "Pinball" Clemons

=== 1993 CFL All-Stars ===
- None
