= Vic Stevenson =

Canadian football player (born 1960)

Profile
- Positions: Center, Offensive tackle

Personal information
- Born: September 22, 1960 (age 66); New Westminster, British Columbia, Canada

Career information
- University: Calgary
- CFL draft: 1981: 5th round, 37th overall pick

Career history
- 1982–1992: Saskatchewan Roughriders
- 1993–1995: BC Lions
- 1996: Toronto Argonauts
- 1997: Edmonton Eskimos
- 1998: Montreal Alouettes
- 1998: Saskatchewan Roughriders

Awards and highlights
- 3× Grey Cup champion (1989, 1994, 1996); DeMarco–Becket Memorial Trophy (1992); CFL All-Star (1992); 2× CFL West All-Star (1991, 1992)

Victor Stevenson (born September 22, 1960) is a Canadian former professional football offensive lineman who played 17 seasons in the Canadian Football League (CFL) for five different teams. He was named CFL All-Star in 1992 and was a part of three Grey Cup championship teams: with the Saskatchewan Roughriders in 1989, with the British Columbia Lions in 1994 and with the Toronto Argonauts in 1996. Stevenson played college football at the University of Calgary.

Currently, he is teaching at Winston Knoll Collegiate.
