= Rocco Romano =

Canadian gridiron football player (born 1963)

No. 59
- Positions: Guard, Offensive tackle

Personal information
- Born: January 23, 1963 (age 63); Hamilton, Ontario, Canada
- Listed height: 6 ft 4 in (1.93 m)
- Listed weight: 300 lb (136 kg)

Career information
- High school: Cathedral
- University: Concordia
- CFL draft: 1987: 1st round, 5th overall pick

Career history
- 1987: Calgary Stampeders
- 1988: Toronto Argonauts
- 1989: Ottawa Rough Riders
- 1990–1991: BC Lions
- 1992–2000: Calgary Stampeders

Awards and highlights
- 2× Grey Cup champion (1992, 1998); 2× DeMarco–Becket Memorial Trophy (1994, 1996); 4× CFL All-Star (1992, 1994, 1995, 1996); 5× CFL West All-Star (1992, 1993, 1994, 1996, 1999)
- Canadian Football Hall of Fame (Class of 2007)

Rocco Romano (born January 23, 1963) is a Canadian former professional football player. He played 14 seasons in the Canadian Football League (CFL), ten of those with the Calgary Stampeders, and was a five-time All-Star as an offensive lineman. While in Calgary, he won two Grey Cups, in 1992 and 1998.

Born in Hamilton, Ontario, Romano was the winner of the CFL's DeMarco-Becket Memorial Trophy in 1994 and 1996 for the Stampeders, which is awarded to the player selected as the outstanding lineman in the West Division. He was inducted into the Canadian Football Hall of Fame in 2007.

He is an alumnus of St. Ann's Catholic elementary, Cathedral High School and Concordia University in Montreal. He married Shauna Sky and they raised two children together before getting divorced.
