= Pee Wee Smith =

American gridiron football player (born 1968)

No. 86
- Positions: Wide receiver, Kick returner

Personal information
- Born: January 3, 1968 (age 58); Compton, California, U.S.
- Listed height: 6 ft 1 in (1.85 m)
- Listed weight: 180 lb (82 kg)

Career information
- College: Miami (FL)

Career history
- 1990–1996: Calgary Stampeders

Awards and highlights
- Grey Cup champion (1992); National champion (1989)

Demetrius "Pee Wee" Smith (born January 3, 1968) is a former kick returner and wide receiver with the Calgary Stampeders of the Canadian Football League (CFL) from 1990 to 1996, but did not play a single game in the 1996 CFL season due to an injury.

== College career ==
From 1988 to 1989, Smith played wide receiver with the Miami Hurricanes football team.
