= Matt Finlay =

Canadian gridiron football player (born 1962)

Profile
- Position: Linebacker

Personal information
- Born: September 28, 1962 (age 64); Toronto, Ontario, Canada
- Listed height: 6 ft 1 in (1.85 m)
- Listed weight: 225 lb (102 kg)

Career information
- College: Eastern Michigan
- CFL draft: 1986: 1st round, 5th overall pick

Career history
- 1986: Montreal Alouettes
- 1987: Toronto Argonauts
- 1987–1995: Calgary Stampeders

Awards and highlights
- Grey Cup champion (1992); CFL West All-Star (1992)

Matt Finlay (born September 28, 1962) is a Canadian former professional football linebacker who played one season with the Montreal Alouettes and nine seasons for the Calgary Stampeders of the Canadian Football League (CFL).
