= Harald Hasselbach =

Dutch gridiron football player (1967–2023)

No. 96
- Position: Defensive end

Personal information
- Born: 22 September 1967; Amsterdam, Netherlands
- Died: 23 November 2023 (aged 56); Parker, Colorado, US
- Listed height: 6 ft 6 in (1.98 m)
- Listed weight: 285 lb (129 kg)

Career information
- High school: South Delta (Delta, BC, Canada)
- College: Washington
- CFL draft: 1989: 5th round, 34th overall pick

Career history
- Calgary Stampeders (1990–1993); Denver Broncos (1994–2000); Green Bay Packers (2001)*
- * Offseason or practice squad member only

Awards and highlights
- Super Bowl champion (XXXII, XXXIII); Grey Cup champion (1992); CFL All-Star (1993)

Career statistics
- Total tackles: 154
- Sacks: 17.5
- Forced fumbles: 4
- Fumble recoveries: 4
- Stats at Pro Football Reference

Harald Hasselbach (22 September 1967 – 23 November 2023) was a Dutch gridiron football player who was a defensive end in the Canadian Football League (CFL) and National Football League (NFL). He played seven seasons in the NFL for the Denver Broncos from 1994 to 2000, winning two Super Bowls, including a start in Super Bowl XXXIII. Previously, he played four seasons for the Calgary Stampeders of the CFL, winning the 80th Grey Cup in 1992. He played college football for the Washington Huskies after attending high school near Vancouver. During his youth, he played a variety of sports while his family lived on four different continents. After retiring as a player, he became a high school football coach. He is the only Dutch player to have become a Super Bowl champion.

== Early life ==
Hasselbach was born in Amsterdam on 22 September 1967, to a Dutch father and a Surinamese mother. His father was an agricultural engineer and the family moved frequently; Hasselbach grew up in the Netherlands, Indonesia, Kenya, and Canada. He attended high school in Canada at South Delta Secondary School in Delta in Metro Vancouver. During his youth he practiced various sports, ranging from cricket, field hockey, to swimming and soccer.

== Career ==
Playing five years of college football at the University of Washington and backing up Dennis Brown and Steve Emtman, he only appeared in four plays, including a tackle of Emmitt Smith. He talked the Philadelphia Eagles out of drafting him in the 1990 NFL draft because he had already signed with the Calgary Stampeders. He then went on to play four seasons in the CFL (two as an all-star). At Calgary, defensive line coach Tom Higgins helped mold his talent before he engaged in a 14-team bidding war for his services, deciding to sign with the Denver Broncos.

From 1994 through 2000, Hasselbach played for the Broncos, where he tallied 154 tackles, 29 regular season starts and a start in Super Bowl XXXIII. He had 17.5 NFL-career quarterback sacks and four forced fumbles. He never missed a game (regular or playoff) in his seven-year tenure (121 games) in Denver. This total included nine NFL playoff games and starts in all three playoff games when Denver repeated as Super Bowl champions in Super Bowl XXXIII, where he recorded two tackles against Atlanta. He is one of at least ten players to have won a Grey Cup and a Super Bowl.

After his career he served as coach at a local high school. In 2016, he was inducted into the British Columbia Football Hall of Fame. He was a defensive line coach at Regis Jesuit High School at the time of his death.

== Personal life ==
Hasselbach's older brother Ernst-Paul (1965–2008) was a television presenter. Hasselbach had a wife and four children. Hasselbach and his son Terran, who played college football for Colorado, were in a near-fatal car accident when Terran was a high school freshman.

Hasselbach complained of memory and concentration loss in the years before his death. He was diagnosed with cancer in mid-2023. He died of a mucinous adenocarcinoma on 23 November 2023, at age 56. At the time of his death he was the only Dutch player to have ever won a Super Bowl.
