= John Kropke =

American gridiron football player and coach (born 1966)

No. 73
- Positions: Defensive tackle, Defensive end

Personal information
- Born: January 3, 1966 (age 60); Chicago, Illinois, U.S.
- Listed height: 6 ft 4 in (1.93 m)
- Listed weight: 278 lb (126 kg)

Career information
- College: Illinois State

Career history

Playing
- 1989–1995: Ottawa Rough Riders
- 1996: Winnipeg Blue Bombers
- 1997: Saskatchewan Roughriders

Coaching
- 2000: Eureka Red Devils (LB)
- 2001–2004: Eureka Red Devils (DL)
- 2005: Winnipeg Blue Bombers DL
- 2006–2007: Montreal Alouettes (DL)
- 2008–2011: Hamilton Tiger-Cats (DL)
- 2012–present: Chicago Maroons (Assistant DL)

Awards and highlights
- CFL Northern All-Star (1995); 2× Intergold CFLPA All-Star (1996, 1997); 3× CFL East All-Star (1992, 1993, 1994)

Career CFL statistics
- Tackles: 316
- Quarterback sacks: 31
- Interceptions: 4
- Fumbles recovered: 3
- Total TDs: 3

John Kropke (born January 3, 1966) is an American former professional football defensive tackle who played nine seasons in the Canadian Football League (CFL) with the Ottawa Rough Riders, Winnipeg Blue Bombers and Saskatchewan Roughriders. He played college football at Illinois State University.

== College career ==
Kropke played college football for the Illinois State Redbirds. He earned AP Honorable Mention All-American honors in 1987.

== Professional career ==
Kropke played for the Ottawa Rough Riders from 1989 to 1995. He played for the Winnipeg Blue Bombers in 1996. He played for the Saskatchewan Roughriders in 1997, retiring after the season.

== Coaching career ==
Kropke served as linebackers coach of the Eureka Red Devils of Eureka College in 2000 before coaching the defensive line from 2001 to 2004. He was defensive line coach of the Winnipeg Blue Bombers in 2005. He served as defensive line coach of the Montreal Alouettes from 2006 to 2007. Kropke was defensive line coach of the Hamilton Tiger-Cats from 2008 to 2011. He has been assistant defensive line coach of the Chicago Maroons of the University of Chicago since 2012.
