= Stan Mikawos =

Polish gridiron football player (born 1958)

Profile
- Position: Defensive tackle

Personal information
- Born: May 11, 1958 (age 68); Gdańsk, Poland
- Listed height: 6 ft 4 in (1.93 m)
- Listed weight: 270 lb (122 kg)

Career information
- College: Mesabi Junior College; North Dakota

Career history
- 1982–1996: Winnipeg Blue Bombers

Awards and highlights
- 3× Grey Cup champion (1984, 1988, 1990); CFL East AllStar (1993)

Stan Mikawos (born May 11, 1958) is a former Canadian football player. A native of Poland who grew up in Winnipeg, Manitoba, Mikawos played college football at North Dakota. He played professional football in the Canadian Football League (CFL) as a defensive tackle for the Winnipeg Blue Bombers from 1982 to 1996. During his time with the Blue Bombers, the team won three Grey Cup championships in 1984, 1988 and 1990. In the 1984 Grey Cup game, Mikawos recovered a fumble and ran 22 yards for a touchdown to give the Bombers a 24-17 lead. He was inducted into the Winnipeg Football Club Hall of Fame in 2000. Mikawos currently resides in Los Cabos, Mexico, where he sells timeshares.
