= Glen Suitor =

Canadian football player and analyst (born 1962)

No. 27
- Position: Defensive back

Personal information
- Born: November 24, 1962 (age 63); New Westminster, British Columbia, Canada

Career information
- High school: Carson Graham
- University: Simon Fraser
- CFL draft: 1984: 2nd round, 15th overall pick

Career history
- 1984–1994: Saskatchewan Roughriders

Awards and highlights
- Grey Cup champion (1989); 3× CFL All-Star (1991, 1992, 1993); 5× CFL West All-Star (1989, 1990, 1991, 1992, 1993)
- Canadian Football Hall of Fame (Class of 2022)

Robert Glen Suitor (born November 24, 1962) is a Canadian sports broadcaster and retired football defensive back who played eleven seasons for the Saskatchewan Roughriders of the Canadian Football League (CFL). Currently, he broadcasts CFL games for TSN, which he has been doing since 1995. Suitor attended Carson Graham Secondary School.

== Football career ==
In 1984, Suitor was drafted out of Simon Fraser University into the CFL with the 10th pick overall by the Saskatchewan Roughriders. In his 11-year career, Suitor was a three-time CFL All-Star (1991–93) and a four-time Western All-Star (1989, 1990, 1992, 1993). He won the Grey Cup with Saskatchewan in 1989 (and was the holder on the game-winning field goal). He ranks among the CFL all-time leaders in interceptions with 51.

== Broadcast career ==
Suitor began his broadcasting career while still playing with the Roughriders, when he became the sports director and morning co-host with CJME-AM radio and CIZL-FM from 1991-93.

After joining the TSN broadcast booth as a guest analyst for the 1994 Grey Cup, Suitor retired from the CFL prior to the 1995 season, and joined TSN as a full-time television game analyst, alongside Gord Miller. Suitor currently works as the lead game analyst on CFL on TSN, first alongside John Wells, then alongside Chris Cuthbert, and Rod Black. Suitor is currently paired alongside Rod Smith.

Suitor is also featured contributor to The SportsCage, which is a daily sports show that airs from 3 to 6:00 p.m. on 620 CKRM in Regina.

== Awards and honours ==
In 2006, Suitor and Chris Cuthbert won the Gemini Award for Best Sports Play-by-Play or Analyst.

Suitor has also been nominated four times for Canadian Screen Awards for Best Sports Analyst, and won the award for his work on the 100th Grey Cup game in 2014.

In August 2015, Suitor was appointed honorary colonel of 417 Combat Support Squadron. Suitor was succeeded in the position by Kendra Kincade in March 2019.
