= Jeff Fields =

American football player (born 1967)

No. 95, 97
- Position: Defensive tackle

Personal information
- Born: July 3, 1967 (age 59); Jackson, Mississippi, U.S.
- Listed height: 6 ft 3 in (1.91 m)
- Listed weight: 320 lb (145 kg)

Career information
- High school: Jackson (MS) Hill
- College: Arkansas State
- NFL draft: 1991: 9th round, 228th overall pick

Career history
- Los Angeles Rams (1991)*; Hamilton Tiger-Cats (1991–1993); Seattle Seahawks (1993)*; Hamilton Tiger-Cats (1994); Toronto Argonauts (1994); Washington Redskins (1995)*; Carolina Panthers (1995); New York Giants (1996)*
- * Offseason or practice squad member only

Career NFL statistics
- Games: 2
- Stats at Pro Football Reference

Jeff Fields (born July 3, 1967) is an American former professional football player who was a defensive tackle in the National Football League (NFL) and Canadian Football League (CFL). He played college football for the Arkansas State Red Wolves. Selected by the Los Angeles Rams in the 1991 NFL draft, Fields did not appear in an NFL game until 1995 with the expansion Carolina Panthers. He had played in the CFL from 1991 to 1994. In two games with the Panthers, Fields did not earn any statistics.

== Sources ==
- http://www.nfl.com/players/profile?id=FIE697551
