= Darryl Sampson =

Trinidadian gridiron football player (born 1963)

Profile
- Position: Defensive back

Personal information
- Born: September 21, 1963 (age 63); Port of Spain, Trinidad

Career information
- University: York
- CFL draft: 1986: 2nd round, 16th overall pick

Career history
- 1986–1995: Winnipeg Blue Bombers
- 1996: Hamilton Tiger-Cats

Awards and highlights
- 2× Grey Cup champion (1988, 1990); CFL All-Star (1993); CFL East All-Star (1993)

Darryl Sampson (born September 21, 1963) is a former defensive back who played eleven seasons in the Canadian Football League (CFL) for two different teams. Sampson participated in 4 Grey Cups with victories in 1988 and 1990. In 1993, he was selected to the East and CFL All-Star teams.

In 2004, Sampson was inducted into the Winnipeg Blue Bombers Hall of Fame.
