= Junior Thurman =

American football player (born 1964)

No. 33, 2
- Position: Defensive back

Personal information
- Born: September 8, 1964 (age 62); Santa Monica, California, U.S.
- Listed height: 6 ft 0 in (1.83 m)
- Listed weight: 185 lb (84 kg)

Career information
- High school: Santa Monica
- College: USC
- NFL draft: 1987: undrafted

Career history
- New Orleans Saints (1987); Phoenix Cardinals (1988)*; Calgary Stampeders (1989–1994); Birmingham Barracudas (1995)
- * Offseason or practice squad member only

Awards and highlights
- Grey Cup champion (1992)

Career NFL statistics
- Games played: 3
- Stats at Pro Football Reference

Career CFL statistics
- Tackles: 309
- Interceptions: 15
- Sacks: 1.0
- Touchdowns: 4

Ulyses Thurman Jr. (born September 8, 1964) is an American former professional football player who was a defensive back in the National Football League (NFL) and Canadian Football League (CFL). He played for the New Orleans Saints of the NFL and the Calgary Stampeders and Birmingham Barracudas of the CFL. Thurman played college football for the USC Trojans. Thurman was selected as one of 75 greatest players in Calgary Stampeder franchise history(CFL) on August 31, 2021. He was a Western All-Star and Canadian All-Pro in both 1991 and 1992. He also helped the Stampeders win the Grey Cup Championship in 1992. Thurman was forced to retire after the 1995 season because of a knee injury.

His brother, Dennis Thurman, played in the NFL and has served as the defensive coordinator for the New York Jets and Buffalo Bills. Dennis is currently the defensive coordinator at University of Hawaii.
