= Kim Phillips (American football) =

American gridiron football player (born 1966)

No. 43, 26
- Position: Defensive back

Personal information
- Born: October 28, 1966 (age 60); New Boston, Texas, U.S.
- Listed height: 5 ft 9 in (1.75 m)
- Listed weight: 188 lb (85 kg)

Career information
- High school: New Boston
- College: North Texas
- NFL draft: 1989: 3rd round, 79th overall pick

Career history
- New Orleans Saints (1989); Buffalo Bills (1990); Tampa Bay Buccaneers (1991)*; Winnipeg Blue Bombers (1992–1994); Calgary Stampeders (1995); Shreveport Pirates (1995)
- * Offseason or practice squad member only
- Stats at Pro Football Reference

Kim Phillips (born October 28, 1966) is an American former professional football player who was a defensive back in the National Football League (NFL). He played for the New Orleans Saints in 1989, the Buffalo Bills in 1990, the Winnipeg Blue Bombers from 1992 to 1994 and for the Calgary Stampeders and Shreveport Pirates in 1995. He was selected by the Saints in the third round of the 1989 NFL draft.

Pre-draft measurables
Height	Weight	40-yard dash	10-yard split	20-yard split	20-yard shuttle	Vertical jump	Broad jump	Bench press
5 ft 9 7/8 in (1.77 m)	185 lb (84 kg)	4.54 s	1.57 s	2.68 s	4.13 s	38.0 in (0.97 m)	10 ft 5 in (3.18 m)	6 reps
All values from NFL Combine
