= Mike Graybill =

American football player (born 1966)

No. 79, 76, 57
- Position: Offensive tackle

Personal information
- Born: October 14, 1966 (age 60); Washington, D.C., U.S.
- Listed height: 6 ft 7 in (2.01 m)
- Listed weight: 275 lb (125 kg)

Career information
- High school: DeMatha Catholic (Hyattsville, Maryland)
- College: Boston University
- NFL draft: 1989: 7th round, 187th overall pick

Career history
- Cleveland Browns (1989); Dallas Cowboys (1990)*; Phoenix Cardinals (1990); Detroit Lions (1991)*; Ohio Glory (1992); Ottawa Rough Riders (1993–1994)
- * Offseason or practice squad member only

Career NFL statistics
- Games played: 6
- Stats at Pro Football Reference

Mike Graybill (born October 14, 1966) is an American former professional football player who was a tackle in the National Football League (NFL) and Canadian Football League (CFL). He played college football for the Boston University Terriers and was selected by the Cleveland Browns in the seventh round of the 1989 NFL draft with the 187th overall pick. He played for the Browns in 1989, the Ohio Glory in 1992 and for the Ottawa Rough Riders from 1993 to 1994.
