= Barry Wilburn =

American football player (1963–2026)

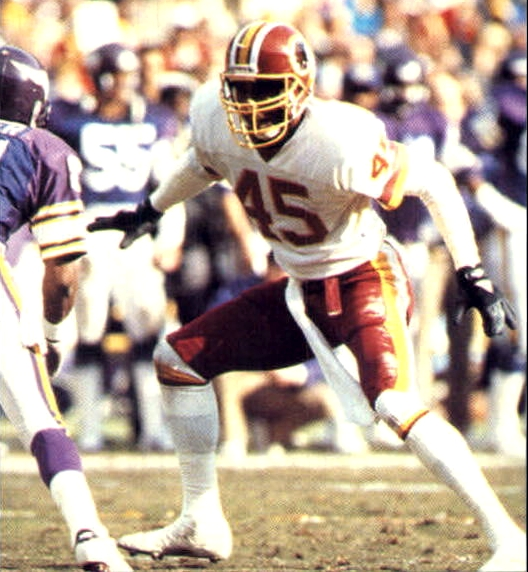
- Wilburn playing for the Redskins in the 1987-88 NFC Championship game

No. 45, 47, 3, 1
- Position: Cornerback

Personal information
- Born: December 9, 1963; Memphis, Tennessee, U.S.
- Died: February 6, 2026 (aged 62); Orange Mound, Memphis, Tennessee, U.S.
- Listed height: 6 ft 2 in (1.88 m)
- Listed weight: 196 lb (89 kg)

Career information
- High school: Melrose
- College: Ole Miss
- NFL draft: 1985: 8th round, 219th overall pick

Career history
- Washington Redskins (1985–1989); Cleveland Browns (1992); Saskatchewan Roughriders (1993); BC Lions (1994); Kansas City Chiefs (1994)*; Philadelphia Eagles (1995–1996); Winnipeg Blue Bombers (1999)
- * Offseason or practice squad member only

Awards and highlights
- Super Bowl champion (XXII); Grey Cup champion (1994); First-team All-Pro (1987); NFL interceptions leader (1987)

Career NFL statistics
- Tackles: 246
- Interceptions: 20
- Touchdowns: 1
- Stats at Pro Football Reference

Barry Todd Wilburn (December 9, 1963 – February 6, 2026) was an American professional football player who was a cornerback in the National Football League (NFL) and Canadian Football League (CFL). He played college football for the Ole Miss Rebels and was selected by the Washington Redskins in the eighth round of the 1985 NFL draft. Wilburn played in eight NFL seasons from 1985 to 1996 (he missed two seasons due to injury) and in two CFL seasons for the Saskatchewan Roughriders and the British Columbia Lions. He played in one final season in 1999 for the Winnipeg Blue Bombers before retiring.

== Professional career ==
Wilburn was drafted in the 8th round of the 1985 draft by the Washington Redskins. Wilburn had a breakout year in the strike-shortened 1987 NFL season after leading the league in interceptions recording 9 and was named to the first-team All-Pro. Wilburn started in Super Bowl XXII that year and recorded two interceptions in their 42–10 victory against the Denver Broncos. In the 1988 season, Wilburn lost his starting job late in the year. The 1989 season was plagued by a positive test for crack before he was put on waivers in May 1990.

In 1992, Wilburn signed with the Cleveland Browns but only played in six games. After his stint with the Browns, he then spent a few years in the Canadian Football League playing for the Saskatchewan Roughriders, and the BC Lions where he also won a Grey Cup title as a member of the 1994 BC Lions, making him one of only ten players to have won football championships on both sides of the border (Super Bowl and Grey Cup). After his CFL stint, Wilburn returned to the NFL signing with the Philadelphia Eagles but saw limited playing time. In 1999 Wilburn returned to the CFL and signed with the Winnipeg Blue Bombers. Wilburn then retired after the 1999 season and he retired with 246 career tackles, 20 career interceptions, and five fumble recoveries in the NFL.

Wilburn holds the Washington record for the longest interception return after scoring on a 100-yard return against the Minnesota Vikings in 1987.

== Personal life and death ==
Wilburn was the son of Olympic great, Margaret Matthews Wilburn and the father of Jordan and Dominique Wilburn, named for his two favorite NBA basketball players. In 2007, Wilburn served as a coaching intern at Howard University, where he worked with the defensive backs.

On February 6, 2026, Wilburn died in a house fire at his residence in the Orange Mound neighborhood in Memphis, Tennessee. He was 62.
