= Duane Dmytryshyn =

Canadian football player (born 1971)

No. 28
- Position: Wide receiver

Personal information
- Born: June 11, 1971 (age 55); Saskatoon, Saskatchewan, Canada
- Listed height: 6 ft 1 in (1.85 m)
- Listed weight: 210 lb (95 kg)

Career information
- College: Saskatchewan

Career history
- 1993–1994: Calgary Stampeders
- 1995–1999: Toronto Argonauts
- 2000: Saskatchewan Roughriders

Awards and highlights
- 2× Grey Cup champion (1996, 1997)

Duane Dmytryshyn (born June 11, 1971) is a Canadian former professional football player who played with the Calgary Stampeders, Toronto Argonauts and Saskatchewan Roughriders as a wide receiver. Dmytryshyn caught 101 passes for 1,609 yards and 9 receiving touchdowns in his career. He also rushed for 80 yards and 1 touchdown.

He won a provincial high school title in 1988 as a running back at Marion M. Graham Collegiate, where he also participated in basketball and track, and was a part of the first Saskatchewan Huskies team to win a Vanier Cup in 1990.

After his playing career he became a wide receivers coach with his college team. He was inducted into the Saskatoon Sports Hall of Fame in 2016, and soon after became a teacher at King George Community School in Saskatoon. Dmytryshyn is of Ukrainian descent.
