= Maurice Henry (American football) =

American football player (born 1967)

No. 53, 16
- Position: Linebacker

Personal information
- Born: March 12, 1967 (age 59); Starkville, Mississippi, U.S.
- Listed height: 5 ft 11 in (1.80 m)
- Listed weight: 220 lb (100 kg)

Career information
- High school: Salina (KS) Central
- College: Kansas State
- NFL draft: 1990: 6th round, 147th overall pick

Career history
- Detroit Lions (1990)*; Philadelphia Eagles (1990); Kansas City Chiefs (1991)*; Ottawa Rough Riders (1993–1994)
- * Offseason or practice squad member only
- Stats at Pro Football Reference

Maurice Henry (born March 12, 1967) is an American former professional football linebacker. He was selected 147th overall by the Detroit Lions in the sixth round of the 1990 NFL draft. He played for the Philadelphia Eagles in 1990 and the Ottawa Rough Riders from 1993 to 1994.
