= Reg Wheeler =

No. 4
- Position: Defensive tackle

Personal information
- Born: 1918; Hamilton, Ontario
- Died: 21 October 2012 (age 93)

Career history
- 1939–1940: Hamilton Tigers
- 1944–1948: Hamilton Wildcats

Reg Wheeler (1918-2012) was a Canadian football player who played for the Hamilton Tigers and Hamilton Wildcats, predecessors to the current Hamilton Tiger-Cats.

Wheeler was born in 1918 in Hamilton, Ontario.

Wheeler played for the Hamilton Tigers from 1939 to 1940. He later played for the Hamilton Wildcats from 1944 through 1948.

During his life, Wheeler worked for Dofasco for 46 years. In 1960, Wheeler was elected alderman for Hamilton's East end from Hamilton, Ontario City Council, a position he held for a total of 28 years. Wheeler also played a major role in establishing the Canadian Football Hall of Fame, and later sat on the Hall of Fame's induction committee.

Wheeler died on 21 October 2012, age 93, after a long illness.
