= Loyd Lewis =

American gridiron football player (born 1962)

No. 76
- Position: Defensive lineman

Personal information
- Born: February 23, 1962 (age 64); Dallas, Texas, U.S.

Career information
- College: Texas A&M–Kingsville
- NFL draft: 1984: 7th round, 196; By the Minnesota Vikingsth overall pick

Career history
- Houston Gamblers (1984–1985); Ottawa Rough Riders (1985–1991); Edmonton Eskimos (1992); Winnipeg Blue Bombers (1993–1994); Ottawa Rough Riders (1995–1996)

Awards and highlights
- 4× CFL East All-Star (1985, 1990, 1991, 1993); CFL West All-Star (1992)

Career CFL statistics
- Sacks: 83
- Interceptions: 1

Loyd Lewis (born February 23, 1962) is an American former professional football defensive lineman in the Canadian Football League (CFL) and United States Football League (USFL). He played for the Houston Gamblers of the USFL and the Ottawa Rough Riders, Edmonton Eskimos, and Winnipeg Blue Bombers of the CFL. Lewis played college football at Texas A&M–Kingsville.
