= Rod Harris =

American gridiron football player (born 1966)

No. 86, 80, 81, 88
- Position: Wide receiver

Personal information
- Born: November 14, 1966 (age 59); Dallas, Texas, U.S.

Career information
- High school: Dallas Carter (Dallas, Texas)
- College: Texas A&M
- NFL draft: 1989: 4th round, 104th overall pick

Career history
- 1989: Houston Oilers*
- 1989: New Orleans Saints
- 1990: Dallas Cowboys
- 1990–1991: Philadelphia Eagles
- 1993–1994: Sacramento Gold Miners
- 1995: Shreveport Pirates
- 1996–1997: Saskatchewan Roughriders
- 1998–1999: BC Lions
- * Offseason or practice squad member only

Awards and highlights
- 2× CFL All-Star (1993, 1994); 2× CFL West All-Star (1993, 1994); First-team All-SWC (1987)
- Stats at Pro Football Reference

Roderick World Harris (born November 14, 1966) is an American former professional football wide receiver in the National Football League (NFL) for the New Orleans Saints, Dallas Cowboys, and Philadelphia Eagles. He also was a member of the Sacramento Gold Miners, Shreveport Pirates, Saskatchewan Roughriders and BC Lions in the Canadian Football League (CFL). He played college football at Texas A&M University.

== Early life ==
Harris attended David W. Carter High School. He lettered in football, track, swimming and golf.

He accepted a football scholarship from Texas A&M University. As a sophomore in 1986, he became a starter at wide receiver, registering 21 receptions for 326 yards and 2 touchdowns.

As a junior in 1987, he returned punts for touchdowns in consecutive games, becoming the second player in school history, to have two punt returns for touchdowns in a season.

As a senior in 1988, he posted 37 receptions (led the team), 592 receiving yards (led the team) and one receiving touchdown (tied for the team lead).

He finished his college career with school records for punt returns (116), punt return yards (971), kickoff returns (59) and kickoff return yards (1,209).

== Professional career ==
=== Houston Oilers ===
Harris was selected by the Houston Oilers in the 4th round (104th overall) of the 1989 NFL draft. He was released before the start of the season on September 4.

=== New Orleans Saints ===
On September 6, 1989, he was signed to the New Orleans Saints' developmental squad. He was promoted to the active roster the week before the sixth game of the season.

He appeared in 11 games, while returning 27 punts for 196 yards and 19 kickoffs for 378 yards. He tied the franchise single-game record for punt returns in a game, with six against the Detroit Lions.

=== Dallas Cowboys ===
On February 28, 1990, the Dallas Cowboys signed Harris as a Plan B free agent. He reunited with special teams coordinator Joe Avezzano, who was his college offensive coordinator.

He appeared in 8 games, making 12 punt returns for 63 yards. He pulled a groin muscle in the eighth game against the Philadelphia Eagles. He was released in November.

=== Philadelphia Eagles ===
On November 30, 1990, he was claimed off waivers by the Philadelphia Eagles. He had 16 punt returns for 151 yards and one kickoff return for 44 yards.

In 1991, he appeared in 16 games, while making 2 receptions for 28 yards, 53 punt returns for 416 yards and 28 kickoff returns for 473 yards.

=== Sacramento Gold Miners ===
In 1993, he formed a potent combination with quarterback David Archer, posting 90 receptions for 1,379 yards, 7 receiving touchdowns and one punt return for 24 yards.

In 1994, he had 86 receptions for 1,280 yards and 10 receiving touchdowns, 89 punt returns for 869 yards, one touchdown return and one kickoff return for 31 yards.

=== Shreveport Pirates ===
In 1995, he had 8 receptions for 95 yards, 11 punt returns for 81 yards and one kickoff return for 31 yards.

=== Saskatchewan Roughriders ===
In 1996, he had 58 receptions for 655 yards, 41 punt returns for 595 yards, one touchdown return and 21 kickoff returns and 417 yards.

In 1997, he had 47 receptions for 703 yards and 3 touchdowns, 27 punt returns for 215 yards, one touchdown return and 18 kickoff returns for 311 yards.

=== BC Lions ===
In 1998, he had 48 receptions for 799 yards (16.6-yard avg.) and 5 touchdowns, 38 punt returns for 417 yards and 40 kickoff returns for 914 yards.

In 1999, he had 30 receptions for 502 yards (16.7-yard avg.) and 3 touchdowns, 6 punt returns for 16 yards and 18 kickoff returns for 300 yards.

== Personal life ==
His son De'Vante Harris played cornerback for the New Orleans Saints and Tampa Bay Buccaneers in the NFL.
