= Dave Vankoughnett =

Canadian gridiron football player (born 1966)

Profile
- Position: Guard

Personal information
- Born: April 1, 1966 (age 60); Kamloops, British Columbia
- Listed height: 6 ft 4 in (1.93 m)
- Listed weight: 240 lb (109 kg)

Career information
- College: Boise State
- CFL draft: 1988: 2nd round, 14th overall pick

Career history
- 1989: Winnipeg Blue Bombers
- 1991–2000: Winnipeg Blue Bombers

Awards and highlights
- CFL East All-Star (1993)

Dave Vankoughnett (born April 1, 1966) is a Canadian former professional football offensive lineman who played eleven seasons in the Canadian Football League.
