= Rob Smith (Canadian football) =

Canadian gridiron football player (born 1958)

Profile
- Positions: Guard, Offensive tackle

Personal information
- Born: October 3, 1958 (age 68); New Westminster, British Columbia, Canada

Career information
- College: Utah State / Siskiyous

Career history
- 1981: BC Lions
- 1982: Toronto Argonauts
- 1982–1985: Montreal Concordes
- 1986–1988: Calgary Stampeders
- 1988–1989: BC Lions
- 1990–1992: Ottawa Rough Riders
- 1993–1994: BC Lions

Awards and highlights
- Grey Cup champion (1994); CFL Most Outstanding Offensive Lineman (1992); 2× CFL All-Star ( 1992, 1993); CFL East All-Star (1992); 2× CFL West All-Star (1993, 1994)

Robert Smith (born October 3, 1958) is a Canadian former professional football offensive lineman who won a Grey Cup championship with the British Columbia Lions in 1994.
