= Tom Shepherd =

English cricketer

Personal information
- Born: 5 December 1889; Headington Quarry, Oxfordshire
- Died: 13 February 1957 (aged 67); Norbiton, Kingston upon Thames, Surrey
- Batting: Right-handed
- Bowling: Right-arm medium

Career statistics
Competition	First-class
Matches	363
Runs scored	18,715
Batting average	39.81
100s/50s	42/92
Top score	277*
Balls bowled	35,523
Wickets	445
Bowling average	30.73
5 wickets in innings	12
10 wickets in match	0
Best bowling	6/78
Catches/stumpings	275/–
- Source: CricketArchive, 14 April 2023

Thomas Frederick Shepherd (5 December 1889 – 13 February 1957) was an English cricketer. He was primarily a right-handed batsman, but was also a useful right-arm medium pace bowler and a slip fielder.

Associated with Kew Cricket Club, he accepted an engagement with Surrey and played for the county from 1919 to 1932, being a regular in the first team from 1921 onwards following an outstanding season for the second eleven (i.e. the reserve side) in 1920 (scoring 709 runs at 101.28 and taking 38 wickets at 15.50). In 1921 he scored double hundreds in successive matches against Lancashire and Kent.

In all first-class cricket he scored 18,719 runs at an average of 39.82, including 42 centuries. His highest score was 277* against Gloucestershire at The Oval in 1927, made in just four and three-quarter hours, he and Andy Ducat adding 289 in two and three-quarter hours for the fourth wicket. That season he scored 2,145 runs at 55.00. He reached his thousand runs for the season in eleven successive years from 1921 to 1931. He had a fine temperament, and was capable of attacking or defending as the situation demanded. His pull and his offside shots were noted for their power.

He took 445 wickets at an average of 30.73, his best innings figures being 6/78. He held 275 catches.

He appeared in Test Trial matches and for the Players against the Gentlemen, but was never selected for a Test. After retiring from Surrey, he was head groundsman and coach for Wandgas Cricket Club in Worcester Park until his death.
