= Will Johnson (defensive lineman) =

American gridiron football player (born 1964)

Profile
- Positions: Linebacker, Defensive end

Personal information
- Born: December 4, 1964 (age 61); Monroe, Louisiana, U.S.
- Listed height: 6 ft 4 in (1.93 m)
- Listed weight: 245 lb (111 kg)

Career information
- High school: Neville (Monroe, Louisiana)
- College: Northeast Louisiana
- NFL draft: 1987: 5th round, 138th overall pick

Career history
- 1987: Chicago Bears
- 1989–1996: Calgary Stampeders
- 1997: Saskatchewan Roughriders

Awards and highlights
- Grey Cup champion (1992); Norm Fieldgate Trophy (1991); 5× CFL All-Star (1991–1995); 6× CFL West All-Star (1990–1995)

Career CFL statistics
- Games played: 132
- Sacks: 99
- Def. tackles: 288
- Forced fumbles: 8
- Interceptions: 1
- Stats at Pro Football Reference
- Canadian Football Hall of Fame (Class of 2021)

William Alexander Johnson (born December 4, 1964) is a former professional Canadian football defensive lineman who played nine seasons in the Canadian Football League (CFL), mainly for the Calgary Stampeders. Johnson was a five-time All-Star and won a Grey Cup with Calgary in 1992.

Pre-draft measurables
Height	Weight	Arm length	Hand span	Vertical jump	Broad jump	Bench press
6 ft 4 in (1.93 m)	232 lb (105 kg)	33 1/4 in (0.84 m)	9 3/4 in (0.25 m)	33.5 in (0.85 m)	9 ft 7 in (2.92 m)	17 reps
All values from NFL Combine

He started his career in the NFL, playing for the Chicago Bears in 1987, where he was a linebacker. He was selected by the Bears in the fifth round of the 1987 NFL draft with the 138th overall pick.

He was inducted into the Canadian Football Hall of Fame as a player in 2021.
