= Jearld Baylis =

American gridiron football player (1962-2024)

Profile
- Position: Defensive tackle

Personal information
- Born: August 12, 1962; Jackson, Mississippi, U.S.
- Died: December 30, 2024 (aged 62)

Career information
- High school: Jackson (MS) Callaway
- College: Southern Mississippi

Career history
- 1986–1989: Toronto Argonauts
- 1991: BC Lions
- 1992–1993: Saskatchewan Roughriders
- 1994–1995: Baltimore Stallions

Awards and highlights
- Grey Cup champion (1995); Norm Fieldgate Trophy (1993); 4× CFL All-Star (1987, 1992, 1993, 1995); 2× CFL East All-Star (1987, 1992); CFL West All-Star (1993); 2× First-team All-South (1982, 1983)

Jearld Baylis (August 12, 1962 – December 30, 2024) was a star defensive lineman in the Canadian Football League (CFL).

Baylis played college football at University of Southern Mississippi., where he was known as the Space Ghost. He had a 10-year career from 1986 to 1995 for four teams. He won the CFL's Most Outstanding Defensive Player Award in 1993 and was a CFL All-Star four times. He was a part of the Baltimore Stallions 1995 Grey Cup winning team. The native of Jackson, Miss. was supposed to be inducted into the Canadian Football Hall of Fame in 2020, but the organization was unable to contact him, deferring his induction indefinitely. He is now expected to be posthumously inducted in 2025 or 2026.

Bayliss died on December 30, 2024.
