= Bobby Evans (defensive back) =

American gridiron football player (born 1967)

Profile
- Position: Defensive back

Personal information
- Born: December 2, 1967 (age 58); Haynesville, Louisiana, U.S.

Career information
- College: Southern Arkansas

Career history
- 1990–1994: Winnipeg Blue Bombers
- 1995: Shreveport Pirates
- 1996: Winnipeg Blue Bombers

Career statistics
- Tackles: 339
- Interceptions: 21
- Touchdowns: 1

Bobby Evans (born December 2, 1967) is an American former professional football defensive back in the Canadian Football League (CFL). He played for the Winnipeg Blue Bombers and Shreveport Pirates. Evans played college football at Southern Arkansas.
