= Mike Richardson (running back, born 1969) =

American gridiron football player

No. 31
- Position: Running back

Personal information
- Born: October 13, 1969 (age 57); Natchez, Mississippi, U.S.

Career information
- High school: Cathedral (Natchez)
- College: Louisiana Tech
- NFL draft: 1991: undrafted

Career history
- 1991: New York Giants*
- 1992–1993: Winnipeg Blue Bombers
- 1994–1995: Ottawa Rough Riders
- 1996: Winnipeg Blue Bombers
- * Offseason or practice squad member only

Awards and highlights
- 2× CFL All-Star (1992, 1993); 2× CFL East All-Star (1992, 1993); CFL's Most Outstanding Rookie Award (1992)

Michael Richardson (born October 13, 1969) is an American former professional football player who was a running back in the Canadian Football League (CFL).

== Biography ==
Richardson attended Louisiana Tech in 1987 until 1991. In 1990, he was named Most Valuable Player in the Independence Bowl. A year later, he was signed as a free agent with the New York Giants. In 1992, he was signed by the Winnipeg Blue Bombers and quickly became a star in the Canadian Football League. Richardson played five seasons with the CFL for two different teams. In 1992, his first year with the Blue Bombers he rushed for 1,100 yards in only 11 games, and had one of the best playoff performances in history with 27 carries for 227 yards and two touchdowns. He was named Rookie of the Year that season. Richardson also was named CFL Player of the week five times in 1992 and was a huge contributor to helping his team get to the Grey Cup that year.

In 1993, Richardson won his second consecutive rushing title in the CFL. He was named CFL player of the week three times that year. He also helped his team go to the Grey Cup for the second year in a row.

In 1994 Richardson signed as a free agent with the Ottawa Rough Riders and started the season off leading the CFL in rushing yards before suffering a severe torn quadriceps which sidelined him for 8 games that season. However, after healing from his injury Richardson came back to finish the season. He stayed with the Rough Riders the following year but in 1996 returned to the Blue Bombers.

Richardson decided to remain in Winnipeg after his football career. He is married, has children and still remains involved in football in Winnipeg.
