= Damion Lyons =

American gridiron football player (born 1968)

Damion Lyons (born April 28, 1968) is a former Canadian football defensive back in the Canadian Football League who played for the Edmonton Eskimos, Memphis Mad Dogs, Winnipeg Blue Bombers, and BC Lions. He played college football for the UCLA Bruins.
