= Dave Sapunjis =

Canadian football player (born 1967)

No. 25
- Positions: Slotback, Wide receiver

Personal information
- Born: September 7, 1967 (age 59); Toronto, Ontario, Canada

Career information
- University: Western Ontario
- CFL draft: 1990: 1st round, 5th overall pick

Career history
- 1990–1996: Calgary Stampeders

Awards and highlights
- Grey Cup champion (1992); Vanier Cup champion (1989 Vanier Cup); 3× Dick Suderman Trophy (1991, 1992, 1995); Jeff Nicklin Memorial Trophy (1995); Lew Hayman Trophy (1995); Dr. Beattie Martin Trophy (1993); 2× CFL All-Star (1993, 1995); CFL West All-Star (1993)

David B. Sapunjis (born September 7, 1967) is a former wide receiver for the Calgary Stampeders from 1990 to 1997. Sapunjis won the CFL's Most Outstanding Canadian Award two times and was the Grey Cup Most Valuable Canadian three times (and is the only player to win the latter award in back-to-back years). He played college football at the University of Western Ontario where he was also a member of Kappa Alpha Society. During his playing career, Sapunjis was nicknamed "the Sponge".

Since his playing career, Sapunjis has become president of Reliance Metals Canada Limited.
