= John Motton =

American gridiron football player (born 1967)

No. 42
- Position: Linebacker

Personal information
- Born: June 20, 1967 (age 59); Columbus, Ohio, U.S.
- Listed height: 6 ft 1 in (1.85 m)
- Listed weight: 225 lb (102 kg)

Career information
- College: Akron
- NFL draft: 1990: undrafted

Career history
- Hamilton Tiger-Cats (1991–1994); Winnipeg Blue Bombers (1995); Birmingham Barracudas (1995); Iowa Barnstormers (1997–2000); Buffalo / Columbus Destroyers (2001–2002, 2004)

Career CFL statistics
- Interceptions: 11
- Touchdowns: 2
- Sacks: 5

Career AFL statistics
- Interceptions: 3
- Sacks: 6
- Touchdowns: 22
- Stats at ArenaFan.com

John Motton (born June 20, 1967) is a former American and Canadian football linebacker and fullback in the Canadian Football League (CFL) and Arena Football League (AFL). He played for the Hamilton Tiger-Cats, Winnipeg Blue Bombers and Birmingham Barracudas of the CFL and the Iowa Barnstormers, Buffalo Destroyers of the AFL. Motton played college football at Akron.
