= 80th Grey Cup =

1992 Canadian Football championship game

Calgary Stampeders	Winnipeg Blue Bombers
(13–5)	(11–7)
24	10
Head coach: Wally Buono	Head coach: Urban Bowman
	1	2	3	4	Total
Calgary Stampeders	11	6	0	7	24
Winnipeg Blue Bombers	0	0	0	10	10
- Date: November 29, 1992
- Stadium: SkyDome
- Location: Toronto
- Most Valuable Player: Doug Flutie, QB (Stampeders)
- Most Valuable Canadian: Dave Sapunjis, SB (Stampeders)
- National anthem: Jeff Healey
- Referee: Jake Ireland
- Halftime show: Céline Dion, and Dan Hill
- Attendance: 45,863

Broadcasters
- Network: CBC, SRC
- Announcers: (CBC) Don Wittman, Joe Galat, Steve Armitage, Scott Oake, Brian Williams, Kent Austin.

The 80th Grey Cup was the 1992 Canadian Football League championship game played between the Calgary Stampeders and the Winnipeg Blue Bombers at Toronto's SkyDome. The Stampeders had little trouble defeating the Blue Bombers, 24–10.

== Game summary ==
Calgary Stampeders (24) - TDs, David Sapunjis, Allen Pitts; FGs, Mark McLoughlin (3); cons., McLoughlin (2); single, McLoughlin.

Winnipeg Blue Bombers (10) - TDs, Gerald Alphin; FGs, Troy Westwood; cons., Westwood.

First quarter
CGY—FG McLoughlin 37-yard kick
CGY—Single McLoughlin 50-yard field goal miss
CGY—TD Sapunjis 35-yard pass from Flutie (McLoughlin convert)

Second quarter
CGY—FG McLoughlin 17-yard kick
CGY—FG McLoughlin 17-yard kick

Third quarter
No Scoring

Fourth quarter
CGY—TD Pitts 15-yard pass from Flutie (McLoughlin convert)
WPG—FG Westwood 46-yard kick
WPG—TD Alphin 27-yard pass from McManus (Westwood convert)

The Calgary Stampeders made back-to-back trips to the Grey Cup, this time with another quarterback at the helm.

Doug Flutie, the two-time CFL Most Outstanding Player, added a Grey Cup title to his legacy, leading the Stampeders to their 1992 Grey Cup championship.

The Stampeders jumped out to a 24-0 lead before the Winnipeg Blue Bombers were able to put points on the scoreboard. Flutie got the Stampeders within scoring range on four of Calgary's first five offensive possessions.

Flutie hit Derrick Crawford on the game's opening play for a 39-yard completion to set up Mark McLoughlin's 37-yard field goal to open the scoring. Flutie and Crawford hooked up again on Calgary's next series, this time for a 41-yard gain, but McLoughlin missed on a 50-yard field goal attempt good for a single point. Crawford, who was the fourth-leading receiver on the club during the regular season, ended the game with 162 yards to lead all receivers.

Near the end of the first quarter, Dave Sapunjis reeled in a 35-yard touchdown pass from Flutie, and the rout was on. McLoughlin added a pair of 17-yard field goals in the second quarter, as the Stampeders held a 17-0 lead at halftime.

Following an uneventful third quarter, Flutie threw for his second touchdown of the game, connecting with Allen Pitts on a 15-yard play.

Winnipeg quarterback Matt Dunigan's string of sub-par Grey Cups continued, as he was limited to just 47 passing yards. He was replaced by Danny McManus in the final quarter.

McManus was able to ignite the Winnipeg offence, but by then it was too late. Troy Westwood kicked a 46-yard field goal to put the Blue Bombers on the scoreboard, and McManus hit Gerald Alphin on a 27-yard touchdown pass to complete the scoring. McManus was 7 of 18 passing for 155 yards.

== Trivia ==
- Calgary had not won a Grey Cup since 1971, the longest drought of any CFL team at the time.
- Flutie's 480 passing yards was 28 short of Sam Etcheverry's all-time record in a Grey Cup game. Flutie was good on 33 of his 49 pass attempts.
- Calgary limited the CFL's top rookie Michael Richardson to 27 yards on the ground. He had rushed for 227 yards against the Hamilton Tiger-Cats in the East Final.
- Following the game, Stampeders owner Larry Ryckman called Flutie football's version of Wayne Gretzky.

== 1992 CFL Playoffs ==
=== West Division ===
- Semi-final (November 15 @ Edmonton, Alberta) Edmonton Eskimos 22-20 Saskatchewan Roughriders
- Final (November 22 @ Calgary, Alberta) Calgary Stampeders 23-22 Edmonton Eskimos

=== East Division ===
- Semi-final (November 15 @ Hamilton, Ontario) Hamilton Tiger-Cats 29-28 Ottawa Rough Riders
- Final (November 22 @ Winnipeg, Manitoba) Winnipeg Blue Bombers 59-11 Hamilton Tiger-Cats
