= 1991 Winnipeg Blue Bombers season =

Canadian football team season

- General manager: Cal Murphy
- Head coach: Darryl Rogers
- Home stadium: Winnipeg Stadium

Results
- Record: 9–9
- Division place: 2nd, East
- Playoffs: Lost East Final

The 1991 Winnipeg Blue Bombers finished in second place in the East Division with a 9–9 record. They appeared in the East Final.

== Offseason ==
=== CFL draft ===
Round	Pick	Player	Position	School
2	16	Guy Battaglini	FB	Ottawa
4	32	Brendan Rogers	LB	Eastern Washington
6	48	Troy Westwood	P/K	Augustana (AB)
7	56	Jason Dzikowicz	DB	Manitoba

== Preseason ==
Game	Date	Opponent	Results		Venue	Attendance
Game	Date	Opponent	Score	Record	Venue	Attendance
A	Sun, June 23	at Saskatchewan Roughriders	L 16–17	0–1	Gordie Howe Bowl	3,363
B	Wed, June 26	at Toronto Argonauts	W 29–15	1–1	SkyDome	31,196
C	Wed, July 3	vs. Ottawa Rough Riders	W 45–32	2–1	Winnipeg Stadium	33,421

== Regular season ==
=== Season standings ===
East Division
Pos	Team	Pld	W	L	T	PF	PA	PD	Pts	Div	Stk
1	Toronto Argonauts (C, Q)	18	13	5	0	647	526	121	26	8–2	W3
2	Winnipeg Blue Bombers (Q)	18	9	9	0	516	499	17	18	6–4	L2
3	Ottawa Rough Riders (Q)	18	7	11	0	522	577	−55	14	5–5	L1
4	Hamilton Tiger-Cats	18	3	15	0	400	599	−199	6	1–9	W1

Source: "1991 Regular Season Standings". Archived from the original on 2009-09-23.
(C) First round bye; (Q) Qualified for playoffs

=== Season schedule ===
Week	Game	Date	Opponent	Results		Venue	Attendance
Week	Game	Date	Opponent	Score	Record	Venue	Attendance
1	1	Sat, July 13	at Hamilton Tiger-Cats	W 23–9	1–0	Ivor Wynne Stadium	13,945
2	2	Fri, July 19	vs. BC Lions	L 23–26	1–1	Winnipeg Stadium	26,862
3	3	Thu, July 25	at Toronto Argonauts	L 16–30	1–2	SkyDome	37,486
4	4	Fri, Aug 2	vs. Ottawa Rough Riders	W 26–19	2–2	Winnipeg Stadium	24,743
5	5	Thu, Aug 8	at Ottawa Rough Riders	L 31–41	2–3	Lansdowne Park	23,414
6	6	Fri, Aug 16	vs. Hamilton Tiger-Cats	W 25–24	3–3	Winnipeg Stadium	25,985
7	7	Thu, Aug 22	at Calgary Stampeders	W 39–26	4–3	McMahon Stadium	27,011
8	8	Tue, Aug 27	vs. Calgary Stampeders	W 28–15	5–3	Winnipeg Stadium	29,102
8	9	Sun, Sept 1	at Saskatchewan Roughriders	L 23–56	5–4	Taylor Field	30,314
9	10	Sun, Sept 8	vs. Saskatchewan Roughriders	W 49–41	6–4	Winnipeg Stadium	28,323
10	11	Sat, Sept 14	at BC Lions	L 23–36	6–5	BC Place	41,285
11	12	Sun, Sept 22	vs. Ottawa Rough Riders	W 40–8	7–5	Winnipeg Stadium	32,675
12	13	Fri, Sept 27	at Edmonton Eskimos	L 15–31	7–6	Commonwealth Stadium	30,212
13	14	Sat, Oct 5	at Toronto Argonauts	L 21–22	7–7	SkyDome	32,194
14	15	Fri, Oct 11	vs. Toronto Argonauts	W 28–27	8–7	Winnipeg Stadium	30,760
15	16	Sat, Oct 19	vs. Hamilton Tiger-Cats	W 68–14	9–7	Winnipeg Stadium	27,127
16	17	Sat, Oct 26	at Ottawa Rough Riders	L 20–46	9–8	Lansdowne Park	23,060
17	18	Sun, Nov 3	vs. Edmonton Eskimos	L 18–28	9–9	Winnipeg Stadium	24,240

== Playoffs ==
=== East Semi-Final ===
Team	Q1	Q2	Q3	Q4	Total
Ottawa Rough Riders	0	1	1	6	8
Winnipeg Blue Bombers	6	7	3	10	26

=== East Final ===
Team	Q1	Q2	Q3	Q4	Total
Winnipeg Blue Bombers	3	0	0	0	3
Toronto Argonauts	22	11	7	2	42

== Roster ==
1991 Winnipeg Blue Bombers final roster
Quarterbacks: 13 Tom Burgess; 9 Sammy Garza; 4 Danny McManus; Running backs: 23 Craig Harrison; 37 Warren Hudson; 27 Robert Mimbs; 32 Matt Pearce; Receivers: 79 Rob Crifo; 73 Fred Hadley; 31 Rick House; 80 Eric Streater; 8 Larry Thompson; 22 Perry Tuttle; 1 Larry Ray Willis; 20 Steve Zatylny	Offensive linemen: 59 Lyle Bauer C; 68 Nick Benjamin G; 51 David Black T/G; 64 Bob Molle G; 57 Steve Rodehutskors T; 60 Dave Vankoughnett G/C; 63 Chris Walby T; Defensive linemen: 54 Steve Grant DT; 52 Mike Gray DE; 44 Leon Hatziioannou DT; 77 Stan Mikawos DT; 55 Jerome Rinehart DE; 43 Quency Williams DE; Special teams: 6 Bob Cameron P; 74 Troy Westwood K	Linebackers: 90 Andre Jones; 34 Greg Battle; 35 Tyrone Jones; 56 Elfrid Payton; 36 Paul Randolph; 53 Brendan Rogers; 58 James West; Defensive backs: 33 Michael Allen; 15 Less Browne; 7 Burt Cummings; 12 Bobby Evans; 25 Kyle Hall; 10 Rod Hill; 30 Darryl Sampson; 16 Eddie Taylor; 14 Andrew Thomas	Injured list: 3 Trevor Kennerd K; 26 Ken Winey WR; Italics indicate American player

== Awards and records ==
- CFL's Most Outstanding Defensive Player Award – Greg Battle (LB)

=== 1991 CFL All-Stars ===
- RB – Robert Mimbs, CFL All-Star
- OT – Chris Walby, CFL All-Star
- LB – Greg Battle, CFL All-Star
- CB – Less Browne, CFL All-Star
