= 1991 BC Lions season =

Canadian football team season

- Owner: Murray Pezim
- General manager: Bob O'Billovich
- President: Frank Gigliotti
- Head coach: Bob O'Billovich
- Home stadium: BC Place Stadium

Results
- Record: 11–7
- Division place: 3rd, West
- Playoffs: Lost West Semi-Final

Uniform

The 1991 BC Lions finished in third place in the West Division with an 11–7 record. They appeared in the West Semi-Final.

BC's high-powered offence set the following CFL single season team records:

- first downs (508)
- yards gained (9117)
- pass yards (6714)
- pass completions (470)

== Offseason ==
=== CFL draft ===
Round	Pick	Player	Position	School
1	4	Bart Hull	Fullback	Boise State
1	8	Bruce Beaton	Defensive end	Acadia
4	26	Andrew Patterson	Defensive back	Simon Fraser
6	42	Lloyd Joseph	Defensive line	Valley City State
7	50	David Serieska	Offensive line	Simon Fraser
8	58	Troy Van Vliet	Linebacker	British Columbia

== Preseason ==
Game	Date	Opponent	Results		Venue	Attendance
Game	Date	Opponent	Score	Record	Venue	Attendance
A	Thu, June 27	at Edmonton Eskimos	L 10–31	0–1	Commonwealth Stadium	31,029
B	Thu, July 4	vs. Saskatchewan Roughriders	W 38–35	1–1	BC Place	21,973

== Regular season ==
=== Season standings ===
West Division
Pos	Team	Pld	W	L	T	PF	PA	PD	Pts	Div	Stk
1	Edmonton Eskimos (C, Q)	18	12	6	0	671	569	102	24	7–3	W2
2	Calgary Stampeders (Q)	18	11	7	0	596	552	44	22	6–4	W1
3	BC Lions (Q)	18	11	7	0	661	587	74	22	5–5	L1
4	Saskatchewan Roughriders	18	6	12	0	606	710	−104	12	3–7	L2

Source: "CFL.ca - Official Site of the Canadian Football League". Archived from the original on 2009-09-23.
(C) First round bye; (Q) Qualified for playoffs

=== Season schedule ===
Week	Game	Date	Opponent	Results		Venue	Attendance
Week	Game	Date	Opponent	Score	Record	Venue	Attendance
1	1	Thu, July 11	vs. Calgary Stampeders	L 34–39	0–1	BC Place	24,722
2	2	Fri, July 19	at Winnipeg Blue Bombers	W 26–23	1–1	Winnipeg Stadium	26,862
3	3	Thu, July 25	vs. Edmonton Eskimos	W 37–36	2–1	BC Place	31,747
4	4	Thu, Aug 1	vs. Toronto Argonauts	W 52–41	3–1	BC Place	53,527
5	5	Thu, Aug 8	at Calgary Stampeders	L 30–34	3–2	McMahon Stadium	31,159
6	6	Thu, Aug 15	vs. Calgary Stampeders	L 28–37	3–3	BC Place	45,485
7	7	Wed, Aug 21	at Saskatchewan Roughriders	W 50–47	4–3	Taylor Field	21,434
8	8	Tue, Aug 27	at Toronto Argonauts	L 25–34	4–4	SkyDome	39,508
9	9	Wed, Sept 4	vs. Ottawa Rough Riders	W 24–20	5–4	BC Place	28,107
9	10	Sun, Sept 8	at Ottawa Rough Riders	W 56–29	6–4	Frank Clair Stadium	24,171
10	11	Sat, Sept 14	vs. Winnipeg Blue Bombers	W 36–23	7–4	BC Place	41,285
11	12	Sat, Sept 21	vs. Saskatchewan Roughriders	L 47–49	7–5	BC Place	41,192
12	13	Sat, Sept 28	at Hamilton Tiger-Cats	W 37–27	8–5	Lansdowne Park	13,626
13	14	Sun, Oct 6	at Calgary Stampeders	W 49–34	9–5	McMahon Stadium	21,146
14	15	Sat, Oct 12	vs. Edmonton Eskimos	L 38–45	9–6	BC Place	54,108
15	16	Sun, Oct 20	at Edmonton Eskimos	W 39–38	10–6	Commonwealth Stadium	39,472
16	17	Sun, Oct 27	at Saskatchewan Roughriders	W 36–5	11–6	Taylor Field	18,192
17	18	Sat, Nov 2	vs. Hamilton Tiger-Cats	L 17–26	11–7	BC Place	47,823

== Awards and records ==
- CFL's Most Outstanding Player Award – Doug Flutie (QB)
- CFL's Most Outstanding Offensive Lineman Award – Jim Mills (OT)
- CFL's Most Outstanding Rookie Award – Jon Volpe (RB)
- Jeff Nicklin Memorial Trophy – Doug Flutie (QB)

=== 1991 CFL All-Stars ===
- QB – Doug Flutie, CFL All-Star
- SB – Matt Clark, CFL All-Star
- WR – Ray Alexander, CFL All-Star
- OG – Leo Groenewegen, CFL All-Star
- OT – Jim Mills, CFL All-Star

== Playoffs ==
=== West Semi-Final ===
Team	Q1	Q2	Q3	Q4	Total
BC Lions	10	21	3	7	41
Calgary Stampeders	7	8	28	0	43

== Roster ==
1991 BC Lions final roster
Quarterbacks: 22 Doug Flutie; 11 Tony Kimbrough; Running backs: 34 Ryan Hanson; 33 Mike Marasco; 25 Sean Millington; 20 Chris Skinner; 23 Jon Volpe; Receivers: 88 Ray Alexander; 85 Matt Clark; 83 Jay Christensen; 86 Ray Ethridge; 82 Darren Flutie; 16 Spencer McLennan; 77 Mike Trevathan	Offensive linemen: 59 Carl Coulter G/C; 53 Leo Groenewegen G; 66 Jim Mills T; 58 Rocco Romano T/G; 55 Ian Sinclair C; 60 Jamie Taras G; 68 Ken Whitney T; Defensive linemen: 36 Stewart Hill DE; 93 Reggie Johnson DE; 79 Derek MacCready DT; 70 Lyneil Mayo DE; 91 Keith Powe DT; Special teams: 2 Giulio Caravatta K/QB; 5 Lui Passaglia K/P	Linebackers: 57 O. J. Brigance; 39 Matt Clarke; 90 Doug Hocking; 51 Bruce Holmes; 37 Don Miller; 35 Paul Wetmore; Defensive backs: 18 Robin Belanger; 7 Lonnie Finch; 12 Norman Jefferson; 13 Chris Major; 8 Ken Pettway; 24 Maurice Smith; 19 Remi Trudel; Italics indicate International player
