= Jeff Reinebold =

American gridiron football coach (born 1957)

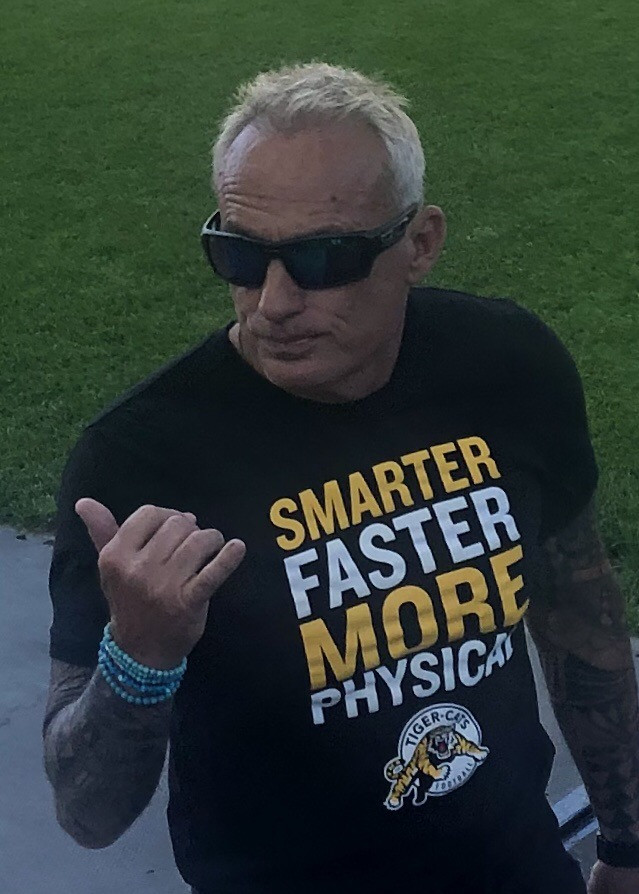
- Reinebold with the Hamilton Tiger-Cats in 2019

Ottawa Redblacks
- Title: Defensive coordinator

Personal information
- Born: November 19, 1957 (age 68); South Bend, Indiana, U.S.

Career information
- High school: Clay (IN)
- College: Maine

Career history

Coaching
- Western Montana (1981) Graduate assistant; Dartmouth (1982) Linebackers coach; Montana (1983–1985) Running backs coach; Penn (1986–1988) Defensive backs coach; Rocky Mountain (1989) Head coach; New Mexico (1990) Outside linebackers coach; BC Lions (1991) Special teams coordinator & receivers coach; BC Lions (1992) Special teams coordinator & defensive line coach; BC Lions (1993) Special teams coordinator & receivers coach; Las Vegas Posse (1994) Secondary & special teams coach; Edmonton Eskimos (1995) Special teams & linebackers coach; Rhein Fire (1995) Secondary & special teams coach; BC Lions (1996) Assistant head coach & defensive coordinator; Winnipeg Blue Bombers (1997–1998) Head coach; Rhein Fire (1999–2000) Linebackers coach; Amsterdam Admirals (2001–2002) Special teams coach; Louisiana Tech (2003) Special teams coordinator & tight ends coach; Hawaii (2006–2007) Defensive line coach; SMU (2008–2011) Wide receivers coach; Montreal Alouettes (2012) Defensive coordinator & defensive backs coach; Hamilton Tiger-Cats (2013) Special teams coordinator; Hamilton Tiger-Cats (2014–2016) Special teams coordinator & linebackers coach; BC Lions (2018) Special teams coordinator; Hamilton Tiger-Cats (2019–2021) Special teams coordinator; Hamilton Tiger-Cats (2023) Special teams coordinator & assistant defensive backs coach; Hawaii (2024–2025) Defensive tackles coach; Ottawa Redblacks (2026) Special teams coordinator; Ottawa Redblacks (2026–present) Defensive coordinator

Operations
- Winnipeg Blue Bombers (1997–1998) General manager; Hawaii (2022) Director of player development

Head coaching record
- Career: CFL: 7–29 (.194); College: 5–5 (.500)

Jeff Reinebold (born November 19, 1957) is an American gridiron football coach who is currently serving as the defensive coordinator for the Ottawa Redblacks of the Canadian Football League (CFL). Reinebold has also coached for the Hawaii Rainbow Warriors, Las Vegas Posse, Winnipeg Blue Bombers, BC Lions, Hamilton Tiger-Cats, and Montreal Alouettes. In addition to the CFL, he has coached in the NCAA, NFL Europe and The Spring League. He has also served in an executive for University of Hawaii—Mānoa. Reinebold appears as a football analyst on Sky Sports NFL telecasts in the United Kingdom.

== Coaching career ==
=== Early life ===
Reinebold grew up in Manor, Saskatchewan, and after playing defensive back for the Maine Black Bears under Jack Bicknell, he accepted the position of offensive graduate assistant coach at Western Montana College. He then coached at Dartmouth, Montana and Penn before getting his first head coaching job at Rocky Mountain College in 1989, where he led the program to its first non-losing season in six years. The next season, he took the job of outside linebackers coach at New Mexico.

=== CFL ===
He began his professional coaching career in 1991 with the BC Lions of the Canadian Football League (CFL) as a special teams and receivers coach under Bob O'Billovich. That season, the Lions set a pro football record for passing yards, with quarterback Doug Flutie throwing for over 6,000 yards; and under Reinebold BC would have four 1,000-yard receivers that included Darren Flutie, Matt Clark, Ray Alexander and Mike Trevathan. In 1994, Reinbold moved to the expansion team the Las Vegas Posse as the special teams coordinator and defensive back coach under Ron Meyer. After the Posse folded, he stayed in the CFL, moving to the Edmonton Eskimos as special teams coordinator and wide receivers coach. In 1997 and 1998 Reinebold would serve as the head coach and general manager of the Winnipeg Blue Bombers, leaving after a 7–29 record.

=== NFL Europe ===
After coaching the Rhein Fire of NFL Europe for one season in 1995, he returned to the CFL in 1996 serving as assistant head coach and defensive coordinator. In 1999, he returned to NFL Europe as special teams coordinator and defensive backs coach of the Rhein Fire. Under Reinebold, the Rhein Fire would win the World Bowl VIII. In 2001 following the World Bowl win with Rhein, Reinebold would move to the Amsterdam Admirals of the NFLE as defensive backs coach and special teams coordinator. At one time Reinebold would have 11 of his former defensive backs on active NFL rosters. In 2004 Reinebold was appointed NFL Europe's senior manager of international player development.

=== Return to collegiate football ===
In 2003 Reinebold served as the tight ends coach and special teams coordinator at Louisiana Tech University. In 2005 Reinebold moved to the University of Hawaii under June Jones and was with the Warriors' 2006 Hawaii Bowl and 2007 Sugar Bowl teams. While defensive line coach at Hawaii Reinebold would coach three players who would be drafted into the NFL; all of which were defensive ends: Ikaika Alama-Francis, Mel Purcell and David Viekune. After three years with the Warriors, Reinebold moved with June Jones to the SMU Mustangs in 2008 where he coached wide receivers. Also while at Hawaii Reinebold was named one of the nation's top 20 recruiters by Rivals.com, and is the only BCS non-AQ conference coach to ever make that list. Reinebold then moved back to mainland United States, where he was the wide receivers coach at Southern Methodist University (SMU), where he participated in three straight bowl fames and a CUSA Championship Game.

=== Return to the CFL ===
As defensive coordinator with the Eastern Division Champion Montreal Alouettes, the Als defense would lead the CFL's Eastern Division in both scoring and total defense and win an Eastern Division crown going 11–7. The Als defense would improve over the 2011 edition in 12 statistical categories and place 5 players on the Eastern Division All Star team and two, LB Shea Emry and S Kyries Hebert, were named CFL All-Stars. Despite the Alouettes finishing first in the East Division, the team struggled on defense and gave up 30 or more points in its first four games, and conceded more than 40 points twice after that. Reinebold's contract was not renewed the following season.

On February 5, 2013, Reinebold was hired as the special teams coordinator for the Hamilton Tiger-Cats. On January 23, 2017, he was hired as the defensive coordinator for the Hamilton Tiger Cats. After a 0–6 start to the season the Ti-Cats relieved Reinebold of his duties.

He was the BC Lions special teams coach for the 2018 season; on January 16, 2019, it was announced he would return to Hamilton as their special teams coordinator. Reinebold remained with the Ticats through the 2019 and 2021 seasons before announcing his departure via Twitter on December 31, 2021. He had been with the Tiger Cats' for seven seasons. Reinebold's coaching career in the CFL spanned 17 seasons.

Reinebold was hired to be the special team coordinator for the Montreal Alouettes for the 2022 season, but left the team for personal reasons prior to the start of the season.

=== University of Hawaii—Mānoa (II) ===
Reinebold was named the director of player development at Hawaii on August 5, 2022.

=== Hamilton Tiger-Cats (III) ===
On May 11, 2023, the Hamilton Tiger-Cats announced that Reinebold had returned for his third stint with the organization, this time in the role of special teams coordinator and assistant defensive backs coach.

=== Ottawa Redblacks ===
It was announced on January 8, 2026, that Reinebold had joined the Ottawa Redblacks to serve as their special teams coordinator. After a 0–7 start to the 2026 season, the Redblacks fired William Fields as defensive coordinator and Reinebold was named his replacement on August 1, 2026.

== Personal ==
In February 2010, Reinebold announced on his Facebook page that he was diagnosed with cancer.

== Head coaching record ==
=== College ===
Year	Team	Overall	Conference	Standing	Bowl/playoffs
Rocky Mountain Battlin' Bears (Frontier Conference) (1989)
1989	Rocky Mountain	5–5	3–3	2nd	
Rocky Mountain:		5–5	3–3		
Total:		5–5			

=== CFL ===
Team	Year	Regular season					Postseason		
Team	Year	Won	Lost	Ties	Win %	Finish	Won	Lost	Result
WPG	1997	4	14	0	.222	3rd in East Division	–	–	Missed playoffs
WPG	1998	3	15	0	.167	4th in East Division	–	–	Missed playoffs
