= 1991 Calgary Stampeders season =

Canadian football team season

- Owner: Community Ownership, then Larry Ryckman starting October 23
- General manager: Norman Kwong
- Head coach: Wally Buono
- Home stadium: McMahon Stadium

Results
- Record: 11–7
- Division place: 2nd, West
- Playoffs: Lost Grey Cup

The 1991 Calgary Stampeders finished in second place in the West Division with an 11–7 record. The Stampeders won their first playoff game(s) since 1979 and also appeared in the Grey Cup game for the first time in 20 years but they lost to the Toronto Argonauts.

The Stampeders had been community owned throughout their history. The team became privately owned when Larry Ryckman purchased it on October 23.

== Offseason ==
=== CFL draft ===
Round	Pick	Player	Position	School
1	6	Duane Forde	HB	Western Ontario
2	14	Don Douglas	TE	Western Ontario
3	22	Bob Torrance	QB	Calgary
5	38	Earl Knight	CB	New Mexico State
6	46	Nigel Smith	SB	Concordia
7	54	Blair Zerr	FB	San Jose State
8	62	Darren Ferner	WR	Northern State

== Preseason ==
Game	Date	Opponent	Results		Venue	Attendance
Game	Date	Opponent	Score	Record	Venue	Attendance
A	Wed, June 26	at Saskatchewan Roughriders	W 49–14	1–0	Taylor Field	20,693
B	Tue, July 2	vs. Edmonton Eskimos	W 25–21	2–0	McMahon Stadium	32,649

== Regular season ==
=== Season standings ===
West Division
Pos	Team	Pld	W	L	T	PF	PA	PD	Pts	Div	Stk
1	Edmonton Eskimos (C, Q)	18	12	6	0	671	569	102	24	7–3	W2
2	Calgary Stampeders (Q)	18	11	7	0	596	552	44	22	6–4	W1
3	BC Lions (Q)	18	11	7	0	661	587	74	22	5–5	L1
4	Saskatchewan Roughriders	18	6	12	0	606	710	−104	12	3–7	L2

Source: "CFL.ca - Official Site of the Canadian Football League". Archived from the original on 2009-09-23.
(C) First round bye; (Q) Qualified for playoffs

=== Season schedule ===
Week	Game	Date	Opponent	Results		Venue	Attendance
Week	Game	Date	Opponent	Score	Record	Venue	Attendance
1	1	Thu, July 11	at BC Lions	W 39–34	1–0	BC Place	24,722
2	2	Thu, July 18	vs. Saskatchewan Roughriders	W 48–28	2–0	McMahon Stadium	22,055
3	3	Wed, July 24	at Ottawa Rough Riders	W 42–28	3–0	Lansdowne Park	18,788
4	4	Fri, Aug 2	at Hamilton Tiger-Cats	W 21–11	4–0	Ivor Wynne Stadium	11,802
5	5	Thu, Aug 8	vs. BC Lions	W 34–30 (OT)	5–0	McMahon Stadium	31,159
6	6	Thu, Aug 15	at BC Lions	W 37–28 (OT)	6–0	BC Place	45,485
7	7	Thu, Aug 22	vs. Winnipeg Blue Bombers	L 26–39	6–1	McMahon Stadium	27,011
8	8	Tue, Aug 27	at Winnipeg Blue Bombers	L 15–28	6–2	Winnipeg Stadium	29,102
8	9	Mon, Sept 2	vs. Edmonton Eskimos	W 48–36	7–2	McMahon Stadium	32,511
9	10	Fri, Sept 6	at Edmonton Eskimos	L 37–51	7–3	Commonwealth Stadium	57,843
10	11	Sun, Sept 15	vs. Toronto Argonauts	W 33–24	8–3	McMahon Stadium	26,122
11	12	Sun, Sept 22	vs. Hamilton Tiger-Cats	W 28–17	9–3	McMahon Stadium	21,512
12	13	Sun, Sept 29	at Saskatchewan Roughriders	L 21–40	9–4	Taylor Field	22,736
13	14	Sun, Oct 6	vs. BC Lions	L 34–49	9–5	McMahon Stadium	21,146
14	15	Sun, Oct 13	vs. Ottawa Rough Riders	W 44–24	10–5	McMahon Stadium	18,761
15	16	Sun, Oct 20	at Toronto Argonauts	L 27–34	10–6	SkyDome	33,590
16	17	Sun, Oct 27	at Edmonton Eskimos	L 23–24	10–7	Commonwealth Stadium	23,391
17	18	Sun, Nov 3	vs. Saskatchewan Roughriders	W 39–27	11–7	McMahon Stadium	18,488

== Playoffs ==
=== West Semi-Final ===
Team	Q1	Q2	Q3	Q4	Total
BC Lions	10	21	3	7	41
Calgary Stampeders	7	8	28	0	43

=== West Final ===
Team	Q1	Q2	Q3	Q4	Total
Calgary Stampeders	7	8	3	20	38
Edmonton Eskimos	14	12	7	3	36

=== Grey Cup ===
Team	Q1	Q2	Q3	Q4	Total
Calgary Stampeders	7	3	4	7	21
Toronto Argonauts	8	3	8	17	36

== Roster ==
1991 Calgary Stampeders final roster
Quarterbacks: 8 Danny Barrett; 1 Steve Taylor; 16 Bob Torrance; Running backs: 31 Duane Forde; 23 Keyvan Jenkins; 34 Andy McVey; 21 Eric Mitchel; 27 Tony Spoletini; Receivers: 88 Shawn Beals; 85 Carl Bland; 83 Derrick Crawford; 6 Mark Guy; 18 Allen Pitts; 25 Dave Sapunjis; 86 Demetrius Smith	Offensive linemen: 59 Leo Blanchard G; 58 Lou Cafazzo G/C; 56 Doug Davies C/T; 62 Lloyd Fairbanks T; 63 Bill Henry G; 62 Pat Hinds C; 54 Bob MacDonald T; 64 Ken Moore T; Defensive linemen: 90 Tim Cofield DE; 95 Harald Hasselbach DT; 81 Will Johnson DE; 75 Stu Laird DT; 93 Kent Warnock DT; 96 Srecko Zizakovic DE; Special teams: 4 Brent Matich P; 13 Mark McLoughlin K	Linebackers: 97 Dwan Brandon; 37 Matt Finlay; 51 Alondra Johnson; 38 Curtis Johnson; 44 Mark Singer; 35 Dan Wicklum; Defensive backs: 19 Karl Anthony; 29 Paul Clatney; 7 Darryl Hall; 15 Ron Hopkins; 32 Darcy Kopp; 30 Kenton Leonard; 24 Greg Peterson; 2 Junior Thurman; 3 Erroll Tucker; 33 Ken Watson; Injured list: 92 Henry Smith LB; Italics indicate International player
