= 1991 Saskatchewan Roughriders season =

- General manager: Alan Ford
- Head coach: John Gregory (1–6); Don Matthews (5–6)
- Home stadium: Taylor Field

Results
- Record: 6–12
- Division place: 4th, West
- Playoffs: Did not qualify

Uniform

The 1991 Saskatchewan Roughriders season was the 77th season in the club's 81st year of existence. The team finished in fourth place in the Canadian Football League's West Division with a 6–12 record. The Roughriders began the season with a 1–6 record and subsequently fired head coach John Gregory and replaced him with Don Matthews who finished the season with a 5–6 record. The stronger end to the season was not enough as the team failed to qualify for the playoffs for the first time since 1987.

This season, the Roughriders set the following CFL records:

- most points scored against one season (710)
- most passes thrown one team one game (65)

They set the following team records:

- most points scored one season (606)
- most total touchdowns one season (62)
- most passing touchdowns one season (41)
- most passing touchdowns one game (6)

== Offseason ==
=== CFL draft ===
Round	Pick	Player	Position	School
1	2	Dan Farthing	SB	Saskatchewan
1	5	Paul Vajda	G	Concordia
2	12	Anthony Hannem	LB	Acadia
3	20	Paul Maines	T	Concordia
3	24	Steve Grant	T	Simon Fraser
4	28	Peter Rowe	QB	Wyoming
5	36	Jim Stewart	TB	British Columbia
6	44	Dan Wright	OT	Queen's
7	52	Michael Dopud	TB	Southern Illinois
8	60	Rob Dutton	DL	Saskatchewan

== Preseason ==
Game	Date	Opponent	Results		Venue	Attendance
Game	Date	Opponent	Score	Record	Venue	Attendance
A	Sun, June 23	vs. Winnipeg Blue Bombers	W 17–16	0–1	Gordie Howe Bowl	3,363
B	Wed, June 26	vs. Calgary Stampeders	L 14–49	1–1	Taylor Field	20,693
C	Thu, July 4	at BC Lions	L 35–38	1–2	BC Place	21,973

== Regular season ==
=== Season standings ===
West Division
Pos	Team	Pld	W	L	T	PF	PA	PD	Pts	Div	Stk
1	Edmonton Eskimos (C, Q)	18	12	6	0	671	569	102	24	7–3	W2
2	Calgary Stampeders (Q)	18	11	7	0	596	552	44	22	6–4	W1
3	BC Lions (Q)	18	11	7	0	661	587	74	22	5–5	L1
4	Saskatchewan Roughriders	18	6	12	0	606	710	−104	12	3–7	L2

Source: "CFL.ca - Official Site of the Canadian Football League". Archived from the original on 2009-09-23.
(C) First round bye; (Q) Qualified for playoffs

=== Season schedule ===
Week	Game	Date	Opponent	Results		Venue	Attendance
Week	Game	Date	Opponent	Score	Record	Venue	Attendance
1	1	Fri, July 12	vs. Edmonton Eskimos	L 25–34	0–1	Taylor Field	20,582
2	2	Thu, July 18	at Calgary Stampeders	L 28–48	0–2	McMahon Stadium	22,055
3	3	Fri, July 26	vs. Hamilton Tiger-Cats	W 52–16	1–2	Taylor Field	19,381
4	4	Wed, July 31	at Edmonton Eskimos	L 24–54	1–3	Commonwealth Stadium	28,183
5	5	Fri, Aug 9	vs. Toronto Argonauts	L 35–37	1–4	Taylor Field	27,093
6	6	Thu, Aug 15	at Toronto Argonauts	L 10–62	1–5	SkyDome	35,786
7	7	Wed, Aug 21	vs. BC Lions	L 47–50	1–6	Taylor Field	21,434
8	8	Wed, Aug 28	at Edmonton Eskimos	W 44–41	2–6	Commonwealth Stadium	26,825
8	9	Sun, Sept 1	vs. Winnipeg Blue Bombers	W 56–23	3–6	Taylor Field	30,314
9	10	Sun, Sept 8	at Winnipeg Blue Bombers	L 41–49 (OT)	3–7	Winnipeg Stadium	28,323
10	11	Sun, Sept 15	vs. Edmonton Eskimos	L 36–41	3–8	Taylor Field	24,166
11	12	Sat, Sept 21	at BC Lions	W 49–47	4–8	BC Place	41,192
12	13	Sun, Sept 29	vs. Calgary Stampeders	W 40–21	5–8	Taylor Field	22,736
13	14	Sun, Oct 6	at Ottawa Rough Riders	L 25–42	5–9	Lansdowne Park	22,038
14	15	Mon, Oct 14	at Hamilton Tiger-Cats	L 21–42	5–10	Ivor Wynne Stadium	12,682
15	16	Sun, Oct 20	vs. Ottawa Rough Riders	W 41–28	6–10	Taylor Field	19,478
16	17	Sun, Oct 27	vs. BC Lions	L 5–36	6–11	Taylor Field	18,192
17	18	Sun, Nov 3	at Calgary Stampeders	L 27–39	6–12	McMahon Stadium	18,488

== Roster ==
1991 Saskatchewan Roughriders final roster
Quarterbacks: 5 Kent Austin; 11 Ted Wahl; 17 Rick Worman; Running backs: 31 Lucius Floyd; 32 Milson Jones; 22 Orville Lee; Receivers: 83 Allan Boyko; 15 Bruce Boyko; 81 Ray Elgaard; 18 Jeff Fairholm; 10 Dan Farthing; 85 Willis Jacox; 82 Tracy Martin; 88 Dane McArthur; 80 Don Narcisse; 89 David Pitcher	Offensive linemen: 44 Roger Aldag G; 66 Mike Anderson C; 58 Chris Gioskos T; 59 Craig Hendrickson T; 57 Bob Poley G/C; 62 Vic Stevenson T; 61 Paul Vajda G/T; Defensive linemen: 77 Wayne Drinkwalter DT; 71 Bobby Jurasin DE; 79 Gary Lewis DT; 60 Glen Scrivener DE; Special teams: 12 Mike Lazecki P; 36 Dave Ridgway K	Linebackers: 39 Dave Albright; 50 Doug Brewster; 41 James King; 42 Eddie Lowe; 74 Dan Rashovich; Defensive backs: 4 Albert Brown; 24 Ventson Donelson; 2 Stacey Hairston; 7 Richie Hall; 19 John Hoffman; 29 Kim McCloud; 27 Glen Suitor; 21 Jeff Treftlin; Italics indicate American player

== Awards and records ==
=== 1991 CFL All-Stars ===
- DS – Glen Suitor

=== 1991 Western All-Stars ===
- OG – Roger Aldag
- OT – Vic Stevenson
- DT – Gary Lewis
- DS – Glen Suitor
- K – Dave Ridgway
