= 1991 Toronto Argonauts season =

CFL team season

- Owner: Bruce McNall, Wayne Gretzky, and John Candy
- General manager: Mike McCarthy
- President: Mike McCarthy
- Head coach: Adam Rita
- Home stadium: SkyDome

Results
- Record: 13–5
- Division place: 1st, East
- Playoffs: Won Grey Cup

Uniform

The 1991 Toronto Argonauts season was the 102nd season for the team since the franchise's inception in 1873. The team finished in first place in the East Division with a 13–5 record and qualified for the playoffs for the sixth consecutive year. The Argonauts defeated the Winnipeg Blue Bombers in the Eastern Final and qualified for the 79th Grey Cup. Toronto defeated the Calgary Stampeders in a rematch of the 1971 Grey Cup, winning their 12th Grey Cup championship by a score of 36–21.

== Offseason ==
In February 1991, the Argonauts were purchased by Bruce McNall, Wayne Gretzky and John Candy. In April 1991, the Argonauts signed Raghib Ismail to a four-year contract worth 18 million dollars. The Ismail signing included four million dollars upfront. Technically, Ismail was only being paid $110,000 a season to play football. The rest was a personal services contract with the intention that Ismail would become an ambassador for Canadian football. Ismail would have 64 receptions, 1,300 receiving yards, and 9 touchdowns.

=== CFL draft ===
| Round | Pick | Player | Position | School |
|---|---|---|---|---|
| 2 | 10 | J. P. Izquierdo | TB | Calgary |
| 2 | 13 | Chris Green | T | Ottawa |
| 3 | 18 | Bruce Dickson | DB | Simon Fraser |
| 3 | 21 | Dave Giocomazzo | G | Boise State |
| 4 | 29 | Mitch Brown | TB | Eastern Michigan |
| 5 | 34 | Tony Clarke | LB | Ottawa |
| 5 | 37 | Mike Lindley | LB | Western Ontario |
| 5 | 40 | Matthew Nealon | WR | Saint Mary's |
| 6 | 45 | Steve Roest | DL | Toronto |
| 7 | 53 | Stefan Soulieres | G | New Haven |
| 8 | 61 | Rocky Hanson | FS | Dickinson State |

== Preseason ==
| Game | Date | Opponent | Results | | Venue | Attendance |
| Game | Date | Opponent | Score | Record | Venue | Attendance |
|---|---|---|---|---|---|---|
| A | Wed, June 26 | vs. Winnipeg Blue Bombers | L 15–29 | 0–1 | SkyDome | 31,196 |
| B | Tue, July 2 | at Hamilton Tiger-Cats | L 25–28 | 0–2 | Ivor Wynne Stadium | 13,612 |

== Regular season ==
Matt Dunigan became the Argonauts new quarterback. Dunigan would miss 10 out of 18 regular season games due to injury. The injuries included a pulled groin, pulled hamstring, and pulled calf muscle. In the Eastern final, Dunigan would break his collarbone in two places before halftime. The Argonauts attendance improved from 30,500 to 37,120 fans per game. Despite winning the Grey Cup and the increase in attendance, the Argonauts lost three million dollars.

=== Standings ===
East Division
| Pos | Team | Pld | W | L | T | PF | PA | PD | Pts | Div | Stk |
|---|---|---|---|---|---|---|---|---|---|---|---|
| 1 | Toronto Argonauts (C, Q) | 18 | 13 | 5 | 0 | 647 | 526 | 121 | 26 | 8–2 | W3 |
| 2 | Winnipeg Blue Bombers (Q) | 18 | 9 | 9 | 0 | 516 | 499 | 17 | 18 | 6–4 | L2 |
| 3 | Ottawa Rough Riders (Q) | 18 | 7 | 11 | 0 | 522 | 577 | −55 | 14 | 5–5 | L1 |
| 4 | Hamilton Tiger-Cats | 18 | 3 | 15 | 0 | 400 | 599 | −199 | 6 | 1–9 | W1 |

Source: "1991 Regular Season Standings". Archived from the original on 2009-09-23.
(C) First round bye; (Q) Qualified for playoffs

=== Player stats ===
==== Passing ====
| Player | Games Played | Attempts | Completions | Yards | Pct. | Interceptions | Long | Touchdowns |
| Matt Dunigan | 8 | 196 | 121 | 2011 | 61.7 | 10 | 87 | 16 |

=== Schedule ===
| Week | Game | Date | Opponent | Results | | Venue | Attendance |
| Week | Game | Date | Opponent | Score | Record | Venue | Attendance |
|---|---|---|---|---|---|---|---|
| 1 | 1 | Thu, July 11 | at Ottawa Rough Riders | W 35–18 | 1–0 | Lansdowne Park | 23,254 |
| 2 | 2 | Thu, July 18 | Hamilton Tiger-Cats | W 41–18 | 2–0 | SkyDome | 41,178 |
| 3 | 3 | Thu, July 25 | Winnipeg Blue Bombers | W 30–16 | 3–0 | SkyDome | 37,486 |
| 4 | 4 | Thu, Aug 1 | at BC Lions | L 41–52 (OT) | 3–1 | BC Place Stadium | 53,527 |
| 5 | 5 | Fri, Aug 9 | at Saskatchewan Roughriders | W 37–35 | 4–1 | Taylor Field | 27,093 |
| 6 | 6 | Thu, Aug 15 | Saskatchewan Roughriders | W 62–10 | 5–1 | SkyDome | 35,786 |
| 7 | 7 | Wed, Aug 21 | at Edmonton Eskimos | L 39–53 | 5–2 | Commonwealth Stadium | 43,826 |
| 8 | 8 | Tue, Aug 27 | BC Lions | W 34–25 | 6–2 | SkyDome | 39,508 |
| 8 | 9 | Mon, Sept 2 | at Hamilton Tiger-Cats | L 24–48 | 6–3 | Ivor Wynne Stadium | 18,461 |
| 9 | 10 | Sat, Sept 7 | Hamilton Tiger-Cats | W 52–25 | 7–3 | SkyDome | 36,102 |
| 10 | 11 | Sun, Sept 15 | at Calgary Stampeders | L 24–33 | 7–4 | McMahon Stadium | 26,122 |
| 11 | 12 | Sat, Sept 21 | Edmonton Eskimos | W 47–28 | 8–4 | SkyDome | 34,895 |
| 12 | 13 | Sun, Sept 29 | at Ottawa Rough Riders | W 25–24 | 9–4 | Lansdowne Park | 26,172 |
| 13 | 14 | Sat, Oct 5 | Winnipeg Blue Bombers | W 22–21 | 10–4 | SkyDome | 32,194 |
| 14 | 15 | Fri, Oct 11 | at Winnipeg Blue Bombers | L 27–28 | 10–5 | Winnipeg Stadium | 30,760 |
| 15 | 16 | Sun, Oct 20 | Calgary Stampeders | W 34–27 | 11–5 | SkyDome | 33,590 |
| 16 | 17 | Sun, Oct 27 | at Hamilton Tiger-Cats | W 39–34 | 12–5 | Ivor Wynne Stadium | 17,453 |
| 17 | 18 | Sun, Nov 3 | Ottawa Rough Riders | W 34–31 | 13–5 | SkyDome | 36,001 |

== Postseason ==
| Round | Date | Opponent | Results | | Venue | Attendance |
| Round | Date | Opponent | Score | Record | Venue | Attendance |
|---|---|---|---|---|---|---|
| East Final | Sun, Nov 17 | vs. Winnipeg Blue Bombers | W 42–3 | 1–0 | SkyDome | 50,380 |
| Grey Cup | Sun, Nov 24 | vs. Calgary Stampeders | W 36–21 | 2–0 | Winnipeg Stadium | 51,985 |

=== Grey Cup ===
- During Grey Cup week, Raghib Ismail embarrassed the team by not showing up to the Meet the Players breakfast.
- Despite numerous injuries, Matt Dunigan would throw two touchdowns in the final quarter to lead the Argonauts to victory.

| Team | Q1 | Q2 | Q3 | Q4 | Total |
|---|---|---|---|---|---|
| Toronto Argonauts | 8 | 3 | 8 | 17 | 36 |
| Calgary Stampeders | 7 | 3 | 4 | 7 | 21 |

Toronto Argonauts (36) – TDs, Ed Berry, Darrell K. Smith, Raghib "Rocket" Ismail, Paul Masotti; FGs Lance Chomyc (2); cons., Chomyc (4); singles Chomyc (2).

Calgary Stampeders (21) – TDs, Danny Barrett, Allen Pitts; FGs, Mark McLoughlin (2); cons., McLoughlin (2); single. McLoughlin.

First quarter
TOR – TD Berry 50 yard interception return (Chomyc convert)
CGY – TD Barrett 1 yard run (McLoughlin convert)
TOR – Single by Chomyc

Second quarter
TOR – FG Chomyc
CGY – FG McLoughlin

Third quarter
CGY – Single McLoughlin
TOR – Single Chomyc
CGY – FG McLoughlin
TOR – TD Smith 48 yard pass from Dunigan (Chomyc convert)

Fourth quarter
TOR – FG Chomyc
CGY – TD Pitts 12 yard pass from Barrett (McLoughlin convert)
TOR – TD Ismail 87 yard kickoff return (Chomyc convert)
TOR – TD Masotti 36 yard pass from Dunigan (Chomyc convert)

== Roster ==
1991 Toronto Argonauts final roster
| Quarterbacks: 16 Matt Dunigan; 14 Rickey Foggie; 12 Willie Gillus; 9 Fred McNair; Running backs: 26 Mark Brus; 33 Darryl Clack; 31 Michael Clemons; 15 J. P. Izquierdo; 27 Paul Nastasiuk; 5 Kevin Smellie; Receivers: 80 Jeff Boyd; 25 Rocket Ismail; 85 Trumaine Johnson; 88 Paul Masotti; 86 Andrew Murray; 71 Matthew Nealon; 1 Darrell Smith; 6 David Williams | Offensive linemen: 56 Ian Beckstead C; 69 Dan Ferrone G; 63 Jim Kardash G; 66 Kelvin Pruenster T; 54 Blaine Schmidt T; 67 Chris Schultz T; 64 Bob Skemp G/C; Defensive linemen: 99 Mike Campbell DT; 35 Bruce Elliott DE; 70 Harold Hallman DT; 77 Rodney Harding DE; 90 Leonard Johnson DT; 44 Brian Warren DE; Special teams: 4 Lance Chomyc K/P; 8 Hank Ilesic P/K | Linebackers: 57 Jeff Braswell; 37 Keith Castello; 42 Bruce Dickson; 21 Darryl Ford; 38 Chris Gaines; 36 Don Moen; 39 Prentiss Wright; Defensive backs: 13 Ed Berry; 34 David Bovell; 7 Carl Brazley; 18 Chris Munford; 2 Reggie Pleasant; 10 Jim Rockford; 23 Brian Smith; 29 Marcus Thomas; 17 Dave Van Belleghem; 20 Don Wilson; Italics indicate International player |

== Awards and honours ==
- CFL's Coach of the Year – Adam Rita
- Grey Cup Most Valuable Player, Raghib Ismail

=== 1991 CFL All-Stars ===
- WR – Raghib "Rocket" Ismail, CFL All-Star
- OG – Dan Ferrone, CFL All-Star
- DT – Harold Hallman, CFL All-Star
- DE – Mike Campbell, CFL All-Star
- LB – Darryl Ford, CFL All-Star
- DB – Don Wilson, CFL All-Star
- P – Hank Ilesic, CFL All-Star
- K – Lance Chomyc, CFL All-Star
