= 1991 Hamilton Tiger-Cats season =

Season of Canadian Football League team the Hamilton Tiger-Cats

- General manager: Joe Zuger
- President: David Braley
- Head coach: John Gregory
- Home stadium: Ivor Wynne Stadium

Results
- Record: 3–15
- Division place: 4th, East
- Playoffs: did not qualify
- Team MOP: Paul Osbaldiston
- Team MOC: Paul Osbaldiston
- Team MOR: John Motton

The 1991 Hamilton Tiger-Cats season was the 34th season for the team in the Canadian Football League (CFL) and their 42nd overall. The Tiger-Cats finished in fourth place in the East Division with a 3–15 record and failed to make the playoffs. It was the first time in team history (under the Tiger-Cats banner) that the Tiger-Cats missed the playoffs in consecutive years.

== Offseason ==
=== CFL draft ===
| Round | Pick | Player | Position | School |
|---|---|---|---|---|
| 1 | 1 | Nick Mazzoli | WR | Simon Fraser |
| 2 | 9 | Mike Jovanovich | T | Boston College |
| 2 | 11 | Phil Schnepf | DB | Carleton |
| 3 | 17 | Lubo Zizakovic | DL | Maryland |
| 5 | 33 | Cal Duncan | OL | British Columbia |
| 6 | 41 | Clark Tatton | DE | Akron |
| 7 | 49 | Roger Henning | DB | British Columbia |
| 8 | 57 | Francois Belanger | T | McGill |

== Preseason ==
| Game | Date | Opponent | Results | | Venue | Attendance |
| Game | Date | Opponent | Score | Record | Venue | Attendance |
|---|---|---|---|---|---|---|
| A | Thu, June 27 | at Ottawa Rough Riders | L 14–40 | 0–1 | Frank Clair Stadium | |
| B | Tue, July 2 | vs. Toronto Argonauts | W 28–25 | 1–1 | Ivor Wynne Stadium | 13,612 |

== Regular season ==
=== Season standings ===
East Division
| Pos | Team | Pld | W | L | T | PF | PA | PD | Pts | Div | Stk |
|---|---|---|---|---|---|---|---|---|---|---|---|
| 1 | Toronto Argonauts (C, Q) | 18 | 13 | 5 | 0 | 647 | 526 | 121 | 26 | 8–2 | W3 |
| 2 | Winnipeg Blue Bombers (Q) | 18 | 9 | 9 | 0 | 516 | 499 | 17 | 18 | 6–4 | L2 |
| 3 | Ottawa Rough Riders (Q) | 18 | 7 | 11 | 0 | 522 | 577 | −55 | 14 | 5–5 | L1 |
| 4 | Hamilton Tiger-Cats | 18 | 3 | 15 | 0 | 400 | 599 | −199 | 6 | 1–9 | W1 |

Source: "1991 Regular Season Standings". Archived from the original on 2009-09-23.
(C) First round bye; (Q) Qualified for playoffs

=== Season schedule ===
| Week | Game | Date | Opponent | Results | | Venue | Attendance |
| Week | Game | Date | Opponent | Score | Record | Venue | Attendance |
|---|---|---|---|---|---|---|---|
| 1 | 1 | Sat, July 13 | vs. Winnipeg Blue Bombers | L 9–23 | 0–1 | Ivor Wynne Stadium | 13,945 |
| 2 | 2 | Thu, July 18 | at Toronto Argonauts | L 18–41 | 0–2 | SkyDome | 41,178 |
| 3 | 3 | Fri, July 26 | at Saskatchewan Roughriders | L 16–52 | 0–3 | Taylor Field | 19,381 |
| 4 | 4 | Fri, Aug 2 | vs. Calgary Stampeders | L 11–21 | 0–4 | Ivor Wynne Stadium | 11,802 |
| 5 | 5 | Sat, Aug 10 | at Edmonton Eskimos | L 13–38 | 0–5 | Commonwealth Stadium | 15,107 |
| 6 | 6 | Fri, Aug 16 | at Winnipeg Blue Bombers | L 24–25 | 0–6 | Winnipeg Stadium | 25,985 |
| 7 | 7 | Fri, Aug 24 | vs. Ottawa Rough Riders | L 19–24 | 0–7 | Ivor Wynne Stadium | 11,027 |
| 8 | 8 | Thu, Aug 29 | at Ottawa Rough Riders | L 14–38 | 0–8 | Lansdowne Park | 24,532 |
| 8 | 9 | Mon, Sept 2 | vs. Toronto Argonauts | W 48–24 | 1–8 | Ivor Wynne Stadium | 18,461 |
| 9 | 10 | Sat, Sept 7 | at Toronto Argonauts | L 25–52 | 1–9 | SkyDome | 36,102 |
| 10 | 11 | Sat, Sept 14 | vs. Ottawa Rough Riders | L 26–33 | 1–10 | Ivor Wynne Stadium | 10,402 |
| 11 | 12 | Sun, Sept 22 | at Calgary Stampeders | L 17–28 | 1–11 | McMahon Stadium | 21,512 |
| 12 | 13 | Sat, Sept 28 | vs. BC Lions | L 27–37 | 1–12 | Ivor Wynne Stadium | 13,626 |
| 13 | 14 | Fri, Oct 4 | at Edmonton Eskimos | L 17–18 | 1–13 | Commonwealth Stadium | 23,128 |
| 14 | 15 | Mon, Oct 14 | vs. Saskatchewan Roughriders | W 42–21 | 2–13 | Ivor Wynne Stadium | 12,682 |
| 15 | 16 | Sat, Oct 19 | at Winnipeg Blue Bombers | L 14–68 | 2–14 | Winnipeg Stadium | 27,127 |
| 16 | 17 | Sun, Oct 27 | vs. Toronto Argonauts | L 34–39 | 2–15 | Ivor Wynne Stadium | 17,453 |
| 17 | 18 | Sat, Nov 2 | at BC Lions | W 26–17 | 3–15 | BC Place | 47,823 |

== Roster ==
1991 Hamilton Tiger-Cats final roster
| Quarterbacks: 19 Todd Dillon; 2 Mike Kerrigan; 16 Don McPherson; 9 Ronald Veal; Running backs: 33 Paul Bushey; 22 Herman Heard; 25 Lee Knight; 28 Ricky Martin; 24 Jamie Morris; 34 Ernie Schramayr; Receivers: 18 Steve Brown; 83 Rico Cartwright; 87 Tony Champion; 23 Rocky Dipietro; 17 Ken Evraire; 89 Tony Logan; 80 Nick Mazzoli; 85 Richard Nurse; 1 Earl Winfield; 21 Wally Zatylny | Offensive linemen: 60 Francois Belanger T; 57 Scott Douglas G; 66 Miles Gorrell T; 63 Darrell Harle G; 51 David Richardson T; 56 Jason Riley G; 56 Dale Sanderson C; Defensive linemen: 93 Romel Andrews DE; 94 David Bailey DE; 59 Jon Baker DT; 45 Joe Campbell DE; 95 Jeff Fields DT; 64 Tim Lorenz DE; 72 Mark Mraz DT; 65 Mitchell Price DT; Special teams: 3 Paul Osbaldiston K/P | Linebackers: 49 Mark Dennis; 90 Pete Giftopoulos; 44 Brian Hilk; 92 Vernon Maxwell; 42 John Motton; 36 Virgil Robertson; 30 Lance Trumble; 35 John Zajdel; Defensive backs: 27 Bobby Dawson; 4 Corris Ervin; 40 Tim Jackson; 26 Rickey Royal; 8 Mark Waterman; 20 Gary Wilkerson; 6 Todd Wiseman; 7 Terry Wright; Italics indicate American players |
