= Michael Allen (Canadian football) =

Canadian football player (born 1964)

No. 33
- Positions: Defensive back, Linebacker

Personal information
- Born: August 1, 1964 (age 62); Clarendon Parish, Jamaica
- Listed height: 5 ft 11 in (1.80 m)
- Listed weight: 165 lb (75 kg)

Career information
- CJFL: Thunder Bay Giants
- University: Carleton
- CFL draft: 1988: 4th round, 29th overall pick

Career history
- 1988–1991: Winnipeg Blue Bombers
- 1992–1993: Ottawa Rough Riders
- 1993–1994: BC Lions

Awards and highlights
- 3× Grey Cup champion (1988, 1990, 1994)

Michael Allen (born August 1, 1964) is a Jamaican-Canadian former professional football defensive back who played seven seasons in the Canadian Football League (CFL) with the Winnipeg Blue Bombers, Ottawa Rough Riders and BC Lions. He was drafted by the Blue Bombers in the fourth round of the 1988 CFL draft. He played CIS football at Carleton University. Allen won three Grey Cup championships, two with the Blue Bombers and one with the Lions.

Allen spent most of his career as a backup safety with brief stints as a starter with the Blue Bombers and Rough Riders. He was best known as a special teams player. He holds the CFL record for most fumble recoveries returned for touchdowns after returning five blocked punts for scores.

== Early life ==
Allen was born in Clarendon Parish, Jamaica. His family moved to Canada when he was ten years old. Allen played junior football for the Thunder Bay Giants of the Canadian Junior Football League and CIS football for the Carleton Ravens.

== Professional career ==
Allen played seven seasons in the Canadian Football League, playing for the Winnipeg Blue Bombers, Ottawa Rough Riders, and BC Lions.

=== Winnipeg Blue Bombers ===
Allen was selected by the Winnipeg Blue Bombers in the fourth round of the 1988 CFL draft with the 29th overall pick. He played in 17 regular season games during his rookie season, in which he made no tackles but contributed heavily on special teams. Allen recovered three blocked punts for touchdowns throughout the season, including one that was returned 30 yards to the endzone against the Ottawa Rough Riders. The Blue Bombers went on to defeat the BC Lions 22–21 to win the 76th Grey Cup, making Allen a Grey Cup champion in his rookie season.

Before the 1989 season, All-Star safety Bennie Thompson left the Blue Bombers to join the New Orleans Saints of the National Football League, leaving an opening on the roster for a new starting safety. Allen was initially designated to fill this role, but it eventually went to Moustafa Ali. He found early success defensively, making two interceptions in his first five weeks. He also tied the CFL career record for fumbles recovered for touchdowns when he recovered his fourth career blocked punt in an August game against the Toronto Argonauts. In November of that year, Allen again blocked a punt which was recovered by Paul Clatney for a Blue Bombers touchdown. In addition to his large role on special teams, Allen contributed far more defensively in 1989 than he did in his rookie year, recording 27 tackles in 16 regular season games. The Blue Bombers again qualified for the playoffs, but lost to the Hamilton Tiger-Cats 10–14 in the East Final.

In the 1990 CFL draft, the Blue Bombers drafted safety Dave Bovell in the second round, who took over as a starter with Allen as backup. Allen had a relatively quiet season despite playing in every regular season game, recording four tackles and returning a single punt. The Blue Bombers won the 78th Grey Cup in a 50–11 victory over the Edmonton Eskimos.

In 1991, Allen started in place of Bovell after he suffered torn knee ligaments early in the regular season. As a result, Allen had the most productive season of his career, recording 38 tackles, two interceptions, and a sack over 12 regular season games. In August, Allen broke the CFL career record for fumbles recovered for touchdowns when he recovered his fifth blocked punt for a touchdown. Shortly afterward, he missed multiple games due to a sprained ankle. The Blue Bombers lost to the Toronto Argonauts 3–42 in the East Final.

=== Ottawa Rough Riders ===
After the 1991 season, Allen became an unrestricted free agent and signed with the Blue Bombers. Shortly thereafter, he was traded to the Ottawa Rough Riders for Brett MacNeil. He played in every regular season game for the Rough Riders in 1992, recording 19 tackles. The majority of Allen's role occurred on special teams, with The Ottawa Citizen's Ken Warren describing him as "one of Ottawa's top special teams players". During a practice in September, Allen fought with fellow Rough Rider defensive back Anthony Drawhorn after the two players insulted each other. The fight lasted several minutes and both players were criticized for their roles in it. The Rough Riders made the playoffs but lost to the Hamilton Tiger-Cats in the East Semi-Final.

After starting safety Sean Foudy left the Rough Riders as a free agent, Allen competed with Hency Charles and Ken Walcott in training camp for the starting role. Allen emerged as the starter in July, but he was sidelined a month later with a knee injury. While Allen returned quickly from the injury, he was replaced by Walcott as starter and was moved to the reserve list for a short time. He was reactivated after Walcott was injured with turf toe, but Remi Trudel was started at safety in place of Allen.

=== BC Lions ===
Allen had a physical altercation with Walcott outside of a Rough Riders practice in August 1993. Shortly afterward, Ottawa traded Allen to the BC Lions for safety Burtland Cummings. With the Lions, Allen was a backup for Tom Europe. He spent time on the reserve list during parts of the regular season and suffered a shoulder injury. Allen played nine games with the Lions in the regular season, contributing eight tackles. The Lions appeared in the West Semi-Final, where they lost to the Calgary Stampeders 9–17.

Allen re-signed with the Lions for the 1994 season. He played in nine games but spent much of the season being moved on and off the injured list with various injuries. The Lions went on to win the 82nd Grey Cup, making Allen a Grey Cup champion for the third time.

=== CFL statistics ===
Year	Team	GP	Defense					Punt returns					Kick returns					Misc
Year	Team	GP	Tkls	Sacks	FR	Int	TD	PR	Yds	Avg	Long	TD	KR	Yds	Avg	Long	TD	Fumbles
1988	WPG	17	0	0	4	0	3	1	3	3.0	3	0	13	241	18.5	37	0	1
1989	WPG	16	27	0	2	2	1	0	0	0.0	0	0	0	0	0.0	0	0	0
1990	WPG	18	4	0	0	0	0	1	20	20.0	20	0	0	0	0.0	0	0	0
1991	WPG	12	38	1	2	1	1	0	0	0.0	0	0	2	44	22.0	24	0	0
1992	OTT	18	19	0	0	0	0	0	0	0.0	0	0	1	5	5.0	5	0	0
1993	OTT	5	9	0	0	0	0	0	0	0.0	0	0	0	0	0.0	0	0	0
1993	BC	9	8	0	0	0	0	0	0	0.0	0	0	0	0	0.0	0	0	0
1994	BC	9	9	0	2	0	0	0	0	0.0	0	0	0	0	0.0	0	0	0
Total		104	114	1	10	3	5	2	23	11.5	20	0	16	290	18.1	37	0	1

== Post-playing career ==
Allen retired after the 1994 season and founded Victory Promotions. Victory Promotions sold pre-paid phone cards that worked on AT&T Canada's long-distance network. Through a licensing deal with the Canadian Football League Players' Association, the phone cards featured images of well-known CFL players and were sold at the Canadian Football Hall of Fame.
