= 1991 CFL draft =

Canadian football draft

The 1991 CFL draft composed of eight rounds where 63 Canadian football players were chosen from eligible Canadian universities and Canadian players playing in the NCAA.

== 1st round ==
= CFL Division All-Star	= CFL All-Star	= Hall of Famer

Pick #	CFL Team	Player	Position	School
1	Hamilton Tiger-Cats	Nick Mazzoli	WR	Simon Fraser
2	Saskatchewan Roughriders	Dan Farthing	SB	Saskatchewan
3	Edmonton Eskimos	Dan Murphy	DB	Acadia
4	BC Lions	Bart Hull	FB	Boise State
5	Saskatchewan Roughriders	Paul Vajda	G	Concordia
6	Calgary Stampeders	Duane Forde	HB	Western Ontario
7	Ottawa Rough Riders	Brett MacNeil	T	Boston University
8	BC Lions	Bruce Beaton	DE	Acadia

== 2nd round ==
Pick #	CFL Team	Player	Position	School
9	Hamilton Tiger-Cats	Mike Jovanovich	T	Boston College
10	Toronto Argonauts	J. P. Izquierdo	TB	Calgary
11	Hamilton Tiger-Cats	Phil Schnepf	DB	Carleton
12	Saskatchewan Roughriders	Anthony Hannem	LB	Acadia
13	Toronto Argonauts	Chris Green	T	Ottawa
14	Calgary Stampeders	Don Douglas	TE	Western
15	Edmonton Eskimos	Christian Masotti	SB	McGill
16	Winnipeg Blue Bombers	Guy Battaglini	FB	Ottawa

== 3rd round ==
Pick #	CFL Team	Player	Position	School
17	Hamilton Tiger-Cats	Lubo Zizakovic	DL	Maryland
18	Toronto Argonauts	Bruce Dickson	DB	Simon Fraser
19	Ottawa Rough Riders	Geoff Mitchell	TB	Weber State
20	Saskatchewan Roughriders	Paul Maines	T	Concordia
21	Toronto Argonauts	Dave Giocomazzo	G	Boise State
22	Calgary Stampeders	Bob Torrance	QB	Calgary
23	Edmonton Eskimos	John Davis	DB	Western
24	Saskatchewan Roughriders	Paul Maines	T	Simon Fraser

== 4th round ==
Pick #	CFL Team	Player	Position	School
25	Edmonton Eskimos	Gordon Walker	DB	Manitoba
26	BC Lions	Andrew Patterson	DB	Simon Fraser
27	Ottawa Rough Riders	Gerald Hilady	OG/DE	Windsor
28	Saskatchewan Roughriders	Peter Rowe	QB	Wyoming
29	Toronto Argonauts	Mitch Brown	TB	Eastern Michigan
30	Edmonton Eskimos	Ron Herman	G	Queen's
31	Edmonton Eskimos	Cam Brosseau	LB	Eastern Illinois
32	Winnipeg Blue Bombers	Brendan Rogers	LB	Eastern Washington

== 5th round ==
Pick #	CFL Team	Player	Position	School
33	Hamilton Tiger-Cats	Cal Duncan	OL	British Columbia
34	Toronto Argonauts	Tony Clarke	LB	Ottawa
35	Ottawa Rough Riders	Chris Flynn	QB	Saint Mary's
36	Saskatchewan Roughriders	Jim Stewart	TB	British Columbia
37	Toronto Argonauts	Mike Lindley	LB	Western Ontario
38	Calgary Stampeders	Earl Knight	CB	New Mexico State
39	Edmonton Eskimos	Mike Purcell	DL	Calgary
40	Toronto Argonauts	Matthew Nealon	WR	Saint Mary's

== 6th round ==
= CFL Division All-Star	= CFL All-Star	= Hall of Famer

Pick #	CFL Team	Player	Position	School
41	Hamilton Tiger-Cats	Clark Tatton	DE	Akron
42	BC Lions	Lloyd Joseph	DL	Valley City State
43	Ottawa Rough Riders	Sylvano Turrin	G	Bishop's
44	Saskatchewan Roughriders	Dan Wright	OT	Queen's
45	Toronto Argonauts	Steve Roest	DL	Toronto
46	Calgary Stampeders	Nigel Smith	SB	Concordia
47	Edmonton Eskimos	Mark Houlder	LB	York
48	Winnipeg Blue Bombers	Troy Westwood	P/K	Augustana

== 7th round ==
Pick #	CFL Team	Player	Position	School
49	Hamilton Tiger-Cats	Roger Henning	DB	British Columbia
50	BC Lions	David Serieska	OL	Simon Fraser
51	Ottawa Rough Riders	Steven Baillargeon	WR	McGill
52	Saskatchewan Roughriders	Michael Dopud	TB	Southern Illinois
53	Toronto Argonauts	Stefan Soulieres	G	New Haven
54	Calgary Stampeders	Dlair Zerr	FB	San Jose State
55	Edmonton Eskimos	Todd Herget	LB	Brigham Young
56	Winnipeg Blue Bombers	Jason Dzikowicz	DB	Manitoba

== 8th round ==
Pick #	CFL Team	Player	Position	School
57	Hamilton Tiger-Cats	Francois Belanger	T	McGill
58	BC Lions	Troy Van Vlient	LB	British Columbia
59	Ottawa Rough Riders	Pat Mahon	G	Western Ontario
60	Saskatchewan Roughriders	Rob Dutton	DL	Saskatchewan
61	Toronto Argonauts	Rocky Hanson	FS	Dickinson State
62	Calgary Stampeders	Darren Ferner	WR	Northern State
63	Edmonton Eskimos	James Gardner	WR	Simon Fraser
