= Matt Clark (Canadian football) =

Canadian football wide receiver (born 1968)

No. 85
- Position: Wide receiver

Personal information
- Born: May 14, 1968 (age 58); Calgary, Alberta, Canada
- Listed height: 6 ft 0 in (1.83 m)
- Listed weight: 180 lb (82 kg)

Career information
- College: Montana

Career history
- 1991–1996: BC Lions
- 1998: Edmonton Eskimos

Awards and highlights
- Grey Cup champion (1994)

Matt Clark (born May 14, 1968) is a Canadian former football player who played for the BC Lions and the Edmonton Eskimos. He played from 1991 to 1998, played with famous quarterback Doug Flutie, and was named a Canadian Football League (CFL) All-Star one time.

== Professional career ==
Matt Clark went to the University of Montana. Clark's first season with the CFL was 1991. He wore the number eighty-five. In his first season, he was named a CFL All-Star along with his teammates: Doug Flutie, Ray Alexander, Leo Groenewegen, and Jim Mills (gridiron football). In 1994, the BC Lions topped all of the CFL and won the Grey Cup. Matt Clark finished his professional career in 1998, playing just one game for the Edmonton Eskimos.
