= John Gregory (gridiron football coach) =

American football coach (1938–2022)

Personal information
- Born: November 22, 1938; Webster City, Iowa, U.S.
- Died: December 12, 2022 (aged 84); Gastonia, North Carolina, U.S.

Career history

Coaching
- 1969–1971: Iowa Central (assistant)
- 1972–1981: South Dakota State
- 1982: Northern Iowa (OC)
- 1983–1986: Winnipeg Blue Bombers (OL)
- 1987–1991: Saskatchewan Roughriders
- 1991–1994: Hamilton Tiger-Cats
- 1995–2003: Iowa Barnstormers/New York Dragons
- 2004: Carolina Cobras
- 2005–2007: Arkansas Twisters
- 2008–2011: Iowa Barnstormers
- 2012: Tampa Bay Storm (OC)

Operations
- 1969–1971: Iowa Central (Athletic director)
- 1995–2003: Iowa Barnstormers (General manager)

Awards and highlights
- 72nd and 77th Grey Cup champion; Annis Stukus Trophy (1989); 2× AFL Coach of the Year (1995, 1996)

John Gregory (November 22, 1938 – December 12, 2022) was an American football head coach. He coached college football and at the professional level in the Canadian Football League (CFL), Arena Football League (AFL), and Indoor Football League (IFL).

== Coaching career ==
=== Early years ===
Gregory's first coaching job was at Iowa Central Community College, where he was assistant head coach and athletic director of the new football program. In Gregory's three years there, the program had a 24–3–1 record and won the Wool Bowl in 1969. John Matuszak, who was recruited by Gregory, went on to become the number one pick in the 1973 NFL draft.

His first college head coaching job was at South Dakota State, where he had 55–50–3 record from 1972 to 1981. Gregory is third in school history in coaching victories and his 1979 team had a single season best record of 9–2. SDSU didn't have a winning record the previous 11 seasons before Gregory's arrival.

After serving as Northern Iowa offensive coordinator in 1982, Gregory was the offensive line coach of the Winnipeg Blue Bombers for the six seasons. In 1984 Winnipeg won the Grey Cup in part due to Gregory's offensive line that helped set a CFL single season rushing record.

=== Saskatchewan Roughriders ===
After the 1986 season he was hired to coach Saskatchewan Roughriders, a team that had no playoff appearances in the past 10 years. While the Saskatchewan Roughriders finished in 4th (and last) place in the CFL West Division with a 5-12-1 record in his first season at the helm of the Western Riders in 1987, the following year, he led the Riders to an 11–7 record and a playoff berth. He won the Annis Stukus Trophy as the league's coach of the year. In 1989, the Roughriders finished 9–9 and won the 77th Grey Cup, their first since 1966. After a 1–6 start in 1991, he was fired and replaced by Don Matthews. He had a 35–43–1 overall record in Saskatchewan.

=== Hamilton Tiger-Cats ===
That same season, he was hired to replace David Beckman as head coach of the 0–8 Hamilton Tiger-Cats. He made the postseason two of the four years he was with the team and finished with a 24–40 record.

=== Arena Football ===
In 1995, Jim Foster hired Gregory to build an Arena Football League expansion team in Des Moines, Iowa. Gregory coached the Iowa Barnstormers to five division titles in six seasons and led the team to two ArenaBowls. Quarterbacks Kurt Warner and Aaron Garcia are considered two of the greatest AFL players ever. Gregory was named AFL Coach of the Year in 1995 and 1996. The Barnstormers relocated to New York in 2001, becoming the New York Dragons; and Gregory left the team in 2003. Gregory later joined the Carolina Cobras as offensive coordinator under Ed Khayat; after a 2–4 start to the 2004 season, Khayat was fired and Gregory took over. In his first game as Carolina's interim head coach, playing the defending ArenaBowl champion Tampa Bay Storm, the Cobras scored 24 unanswered points in the third quarter to win 54–43; it was the team's first home win since 2002. However, the Cobras suffered a losing streak that dropped them to 3–7, leading to Gregory's dismissal with six games left in the season.

In 2005, Gregory came out of retirement to coach the Arkansas Twisters. He went 5–7 in his first season and 10–6 in the 2006 season, losing the National Conference Championship to the Spokane Shock. In 2007, the Twisters improved to a 12–4 record, a franchise best, but lost to the Bossier–Shreveport Battle Wings in the first round of the playoffs.

In 2007, it was announced that Gregory would return to Iowa to coach the new expansion Iowa Barnstormers.

On May 17, 2011, Gregory resigned from his position with the Barnstormers.

In 2012, Gregory was the offensive coordinator for the Tampa Bay Storm. It is his first position where he has not been a team head coach for more than two decades.

Gregory was the commissioner of the National Arena League during its first season in 2017.

== Personal life and death ==
Gregory died on December 12, 2022, at the age of 84.

== Head coaching record ==
=== College ===
Year	Team	Overall	Conference	Standing	Bowl/playoffs
South Dakota State Jackrabbits (North Central Conference) (1972–1981)
1972	South Dakota State	6–5	2–5	6th	
1973	South Dakota State	5–5–1	2–4–1	6th	
1974	South Dakota State	6–5	4–3	4th	
1975	South Dakota State	7–4	4–3	4th	
1976	South Dakota State	5–4–1	4–1–1	2nd	
1977	South Dakota State	5–4–1	3–3–1	T–4th	
1978	South Dakota State	5–6	3–3	T–3rd	
1979	South Dakota State	9–3	4–2	T–2nd	L NCAA Division II Quarterfinal
1980	South Dakota State	3–8	1–5–1	7th	
1981	South Dakota State	4–6	2–4–1	6th	
South Dakota State:		55–50–3	29–33–5		
Total:		55–50–3			

=== CFL ===
Team	Year	Regular season					Postseason			
Team	Year	Won	Lost	Ties	Win %	Finish	Won	Lost	Win %	Result
SAS	1987	5	12	1	.294	4th in West Division	–	–	–	–
SAS	1988	11	7	0	.611	2nd in West Division	0	1	.000	Lost West Semi-Final
SAS	1989	9	9	0	.500	3rd in West Division	3	0	1.000	Won Grey Cup
SAS	1990	9	9	0	.500	3rd in West Division	0	1	.000	Lost West Semi-Final
SAS	1991	1	6	0	.143	4th in West Division	–	–	–	Fired
HAM	1991	3	7	0	.300	4th in East Division	–	–	–	–
HAM	1992	11	7	0	.611	2nd in East Division	1	1	.500	Lost East Final
HAM	1993	6	12	0	.333	2nd in East Division	1	1	.500	Lost East Final
HAM	1994	1	5	0	.167	5th in East Division	–	–	–	Fired
Total		61	82	1	.426	0 Division Championships	5	4	.555	1 Grey Cups

=== AFL & af2 ===
Team	Year	Regular season					Postseason			
Team	Year	Won	Lost	Ties	Win %	Finish	Won	Lost	Win %	Result
Iowa	1995	7	5	0	.583	2nd in AC Central	1	1	.500	Lost in AC Semifinals
Iowa	1996	12	2	0	.857	1st in AC Central	2	1	.667	Lost in ArenaBowl X
Iowa	1997	11	3	0	.786	1st in AC Central	2	1	.667	Lost in ArenaBowl XI
Iowa	1998	5	9	0	.357	3rd in AC Central	–	–	–	–
Iowa	1999	11	3	0	.786	1st in AC Central	1	1	.500	Lost in AC Final
Iowa	2000	9	5	0	.643	1st in AC Central	0	1	.000	Lost in AC Semifinal
NY	2001	8	6	0	.571	1st in NC Eastern	0	1	.000	Lost in Wild Card
NY	2002	3	11	0	.214	4th in NC Eastern	–	–	–	–
NY	2003	0	4	0	.000	4th in NC Eastern	–	–	–	–
CAR	2004	6	10	0	.375	2nd in NC Eastern	–	–	–	–
ARK	2005	5	7	0	.417	3rd in AC South	–	–	–	–
ARK	2006	10	6	0	.625	1st in NC Midwest	2	1	.667	Lost in NC Final
ARK	2007	12	4	0	.688	1st in NC Central	0	1	.000	Lost in First round
Iowa	2008	6	10	0	.375	5th in AC Midwest	–	–	–	–
Iowa	2009	12	4	0	.750	1st AC in Midwest	0	1	.000	Lost in First round
Iowa	2010	7	9	0	.438	4th NC in Midwest	–	–	–	–
Iowa	2011	2	7	0	.222	4th^{th} NC in Central	–	–	–	–
Total		117	90	0	.565		8	9	.471	

Preceded by Mike Riley	Grey Cup–winning head coach 77th Grey Cup, 1989	Succeeded by Mike Riley
