= 1991 Ottawa Rough Riders season =

Canadian football team season

- Head coach: Joe Faragalli
- Home stadium: Frank Clair Stadium

Results
- Record: 7–11
- Division place: 3rd, East
- Playoffs: Lost East Semi-Final

Uniform

The 1991 Ottawa Rough Riders finished third place in the East Division with a 7–11 record. They were defeated in the East Semi-Final by the Winnipeg Blue Bombers.

== Offseason ==
=== CFL draft ===
Round	Pick	Player	Position	School
1	7	Brett MacNeil	OT	Boston University
3	19	Geoff Mitchell	RB	Weber State
4	27	Gerald Hlady	OG/DE	Windsor
5	35	Chris Flynn	QB	Saint Mary's
6	43	Sylvano Turrin	OG	Bishop's
7	51	Steven Baillargeon	WR	McGill
8	59	Pat Mahon	G	Western Ontario

=== Preseason ===
Game	Date	Opponent	Results		Venue	Attendance
Game	Date	Opponent	Score	Record	Venue	Attendance
A	Thu, June 27	vs. Hamilton Tiger-Cats	W 40–14	1–0	Frank Clair Stadium	
B	Wed, July 3	at Winnipeg Blue Bombers	L 32–45	1–1	Winnipeg Stadium	33,421

== Regular season ==
=== Season standings ===
East Division
Pos	Team	Pld	W	L	T	PF	PA	PD	Pts	Div	Stk
1	Toronto Argonauts (C, Q)	18	13	5	0	647	526	121	26	8–2	W3
2	Winnipeg Blue Bombers (Q)	18	9	9	0	516	499	17	18	6–4	L2
3	Ottawa Rough Riders (Q)	18	7	11	0	522	577	−55	14	5–5	L1
4	Hamilton Tiger-Cats	18	3	15	0	400	599	−199	6	1–9	W1

Source: "1991 Regular Season Standings". Archived from the original on 2009-09-23.
(C) First round bye; (Q) Qualified for playoffs

=== Schedule ===
Week	Game	Date	Opponent	Results		Venue	Attendance
Week	Game	Date	Opponent	Score	Record	Venue	Attendance
1	1	Thu, July 11	vs. Toronto Argonauts	L 18–35	0–1	Lansdowne Park	23,254
2	2	Wed, July 17	at Edmonton Eskimos	L 33–40	0–2	Commonwealth Stadium	35,511
3	3	Wed, July 24	vs. Calgary Stampeders	L 28–42	0–3	Lansdowne Park	18,788
4	4	Fri, Aug 2	at Winnipeg Blue Bombers	L 19–26	0–4	Winnipeg Stadium	24,743
5	5	Thu, Aug 8	vs. Winnipeg Blue Bombers	W 41–31	1–4	Lansdowne Park	23,414
6	6	Thu, Aug 15	vs. Edmonton Eskimos	W 36–35	2–4	Lansdowne Park	25,884
7	7	Sat, Aug 24	at Hamilton Tiger-Cats	W 24–19	3–4	Ivor Wynne Stadium	11,027
8	8	Thu, Aug 29	vs. Hamilton Tiger-Cats	W 38–14	4–4	Lansdowne Park	24,532
9	9	Wed, Sept 4	at BC Lions	L 20–24	4–5	BC Place	28,107
9	10	Sun, Sept 8	vs. BC Lions	L 29–56	4–6	Lansdowne Park	24,171
10	11	Sat, Sept 14	at Hamilton Tiger-Cats	W 33–26	5–6	Ivor Wynne Stadium	10,402
11	12	Sun, Sept 22	at Winnipeg Blue Bombers	L 8–40	5–7	Winnipeg Stadium	32,675
12	13	Sun, Sept 29	vs. Toronto Argonauts	L 24–25	5–8	Lansdowne Park	26,172
13	14	Sun, Oct 6	vs. Saskatchewan Roughriders	W 42–25	6–8	Lansdowne Park	22,038
14	15	Sun, Oct 13	at Calgary Stampeders	L 24–44	6–9	McMahon Stadium	18,761
15	16	Sun, Oct 20	at Saskatchewan Roughriders	L 28–41	6–10	Taylor Field	19,478
16	17	Sat, Oct 26	vs. Winnipeg Blue Bombers	W 46–20	7–10	Lansdowne Park	23,060
17	18	Sun, Nov 3	at Toronto Argonauts	L 31–34	7–11	SkyDome	36,001

== Postseason ==
Round	Date	Opponent	Results		Venue	Attendance
Round	Date	Opponent	Score	Record	Venue	Attendance
East Semi-Final	Sun, Nov 10	at Winnipeg Blue Bombers	L 8–26	0–1	Winnipeg Stadium	22,799

== Roster ==
1991 Ottawa Rough Riders final roster
Quarterbacks: 9 Damon Allen; 15 John Congemi; 4 Jason Garrett; 6 Terrence Jones; Running backs: 19 Reggie Barnes; 25 David Conrad; 34 Shawn Daniels; 32 Kensley Palmer; Receivers: 81 Jock Climie; 85 James Ellingson; 86 Bob Gordon; 16 Dan Johnston; 89 Stephen Jones; 87 Gerald Wilcox	Offensive linemen: 54 Irv Daymond C; 61 Bryan Illerbrun T; 56 Michel Lamy G; 65 Gerald Roper G; 58 Rob Smith T; 55 Brad Tierney G; 69 Kari Yli-Renko T; Defensive linemen: 73 John Kropke DT; 68 Glenn Kulka DE; 76 Loyd Lewis DT; 74 Rob Prodanovic DE; 63 Michel Raby DT; 98 Lybrant Robinson DE; 45 Greg Stumon DE	Linebackers: 90 Brian Bonner; 17 Tracy Gravely; 42 Jeff Jackson; 36 Brent Lewis; 91 Angelo Snipes; 35 Pat Wayne; 43 Gord Weber; Defensive backs: 7 Anthony Drawhorn; 14 Scott Flagel; 22 Sean Foudy; 1 Andre Francis; 26 Charles Gordon; 27 Daniel Hunter; 39 Charlie Wright	Special teams: 10 Terry Baker K/P; Injured list: 16 Bart Hull RB; Italics indicate International player

== Awards and honours ==
=== 1991 CFL All-Stars ===
- None
