= David Beckman =

American and Canadian football coach

David Beckman (born June 8, 1938) is a former Canadian Football League head coach.

== Coaching career ==
Beckman began coaching as an assistant at his alma mater, Baldwin–Wallace College. From there he coached at University of Evansville and spent the years of 1973 through 1978 at the University of Iowa.

The next six years Beckman spent in the front office of the Cleveland Browns. He moved to the San Diego Chargers in 1985 where he spent two season in the personnel office.

Beckman was named director of player personnel for the Hamilton Tiger-Cats in April 1990. During that season, Beckman was promoted to interim head coach when Al Bruno was fired with six games remaining. Beckman finished with a 2–4 record. He began the 1991 season as head coach, but was fired on August 30 after going winless in the team's first eight games. He was replaced by John Gregory, who had been fired by the Saskatchewan Roughriders earlier that season.

Beckman has two sons, Tim and Theodore. Tim Beckman followed in his father's profession and became a head football coach at Toledo and Illinois.
