= Brian Forde =

Canadian gridiron football player (born 1963)

No. 52, 48, 90
- Position: Linebacker

Personal information
- Born: November 1, 1963 (age 63); Montreal, Quebec, Canada
- Listed height: 6 ft 2 in (1.88 m)
- Listed weight: 230 lb (104 kg)

Career information
- High school: Sherbrooke (QC) Champlain
- College: Washington State
- NFL draft: 1988: 7th round, 190th overall pick
- CFL draft: 1988: 1st round, 8th overall pick

Career history
- New Orleans Saints (1988–1991); Atlanta Falcons (1992); Denver Broncos (1993)*; BC Lions (1994–1995); Amsterdam Admirals (1996); Montreal Alouettes (1996)
- * Offseason or practice squad member only

Awards and highlights
- Second-team All-Pac-10 (1987)

Career NFL statistics
- Fumble recoveries: 2
- Safeties: 1
- Stats at Pro Football Reference

Brian Michael Forde (born November 1, 1963) is a Canadian former professional football player who was a linebacker in the National Football League (NFL) and Canadian Football League (CFL). He played for the New Orleans Saints from 1988 to 1991, the BC Lions from 1994 to 1995 and for the Montreal Alouettes in 1996. He was selected by the Saints in the seventh round of the 1988 NFL draft.
