= Srecko Zizakovic =

Canadian gridiron football player (born 1966)

No. 96
- Position: Defensive tackle

Personal information
- Born: August 13, 1966 (age 60); Toronto, Canada
- Listed height: 6 ft 5 in (1.96 m)
- Listed weight: 255 lb (116 kg)

Career information
- High school: Weston (Toronto)
- College: Ohio State (1985–1989)
- NFL draft: 1989: undrafted
- CFL draft: 1989: 4th round, 26th overall pick

Career history
- Calgary Stampeders (1990–1995)

Awards and highlights
- Grey Cup champion (1992)

Srecko Zizakovic (born August 13, 1966) is a Canadian former professional football defensive tackle who played for the Calgary Stampeders of the Canadian Football League (CFL) for six seasons from 1990 to 1995, winning the Grey Cup in 1992. He played college football for the Ohio State Buckeyes.

== College career ==
Zizakovic played college football for the Ohio State Buckeyes from 1985 to 1995. He made 98 tackles, including 15 tackles for loss, 11 sacks, one pass deflection and one forced fumble.

== Professional career ==
Zizakovic was selected by the Calgary Stampeders with the 26th pick in the fourth round of the 1989 CFL draft. He officially signed with the team on May 23, 1990. Zizakovic played in 77 games in his career, 126 tackles, including ten tackles for loss, 22 sacks, one pass deflection, two fumble recoveries and 2 interceptions. He scored two touchdowns in his career, a rushing touchdown in 1991 and a pick-six in 1995.

Zizakovic was a member of the 1992 Grey Cup championship winning squad. He officially retired on May 30, 1996.
