= Ronald Veal =

American football player (born 1968)

No. 9
- Position: Quarterback

Personal information
- Born: July 16, 1968 (age 58); Fernandina Beach, Florida, U.S.
- Listed height: 5 ft 10 in (1.78 m)
- Listed weight: 190 lb (86 kg)

Career information
- High school: Fernandina Beach
- College: Arizona (1987–1990)
- NFL draft: 1991: undrafted

Career history
- Hamilton Tiger-Cats (1991)

Ronald R. Veal (born July 16, 1968) is an American former football quarterback. He played college football at Arizona, and professionally for the Hamilton Tiger-Cats of the Canadian Football League (CFL).

== Early life ==
Ronald R. Veal was born on July 16, 1968, in Fernandina Beach, Florida. He played high school football at Fernandina Beach High School as a two-way player. As a senior on offense, he completed 51 of 126 passes for 660 yards, four touchdowns, and six interceptions while also rushing for 500 yards and eight touchdowns. He played defensive back on defense.

== College career ==
Veal played college football at the University of Arizona, where was a four-year letterman for the Arizona Wildcats from 1987 to 1990. He began his freshman year in 1987 as the backup quarterback to Bobby Watters, but took over as starter after Watters suffered an injury. Veal finished the year completing 75 of 153 passes (49.0%) for 1,239 yards, four touchdowns, and nine interceptions while also rushing for 566 yards and nine touchdowns. He split time with Watters in 1988. Veal started six games overall during the 1988 season, recording 40 completions on 105 passing attempts (38.1%) for 669 yards, four touchdowns, three interceptions, 257 rushing yards and five rushing touchdowns. He split time with George Malauulu during both the 1989 and 1990 seasons. Veal finished his college career with totals of 197 completions on 441 passing attempts (44.7%) for 2,867 yards, 13 touchdowns, and 18 interceptions, 1,419 rushing yards, and 27 rushing touchdowns.

== Professional career ==
After going undrafted in the 1991 NFL draft, Veal signed with the Hamilton Tiger-Cats of the Canadian Football League (CFL) on May 3, 1991. He dressed in seven games for the Tiger-Cats during the 1991 CFL season, completing two of four passes for 13 yards while also rushing four times for 22 yards. He was released in late August, but then signed to the team's practice roster on September 3, 1991. Veal was released by Hamilton in late June 1992 before the start of the 1992 CFL season.

== Personal life ==
Veal has served as a quarterbacks coach in Atlanta, Georgia, after his playing career. He has worked with Trevor Lawrence and Justin Fields. The New York Times stated that Veal is "one of the state’s, if not the country’s, most prolific quarterback coaches."
