= Nick Mazzoli =

Canadian football player (born 1968)

Retired
- Position: Wide receiver
- Roster status: Retired
- CFL status: National

Personal information
- Born: August 8, 1968 (age 58); Markham, Ontario, Canada
- Listed height: 5 ft 11 in (1.80 m)
- Listed weight: 180 lb (82 kg)

Career information
- College: Simon Fraser
- CFL draft: 1991: 1st round, 1st overall pick

Career history
- 1991–1993: Hamilton Tiger-Cats
- 1994: Ottawa Rough Riders
- 1995–1996: Edmonton Eskimos
- 1997: BC Lions

Nick Mazzoli (born August 8, 1968) is a retired professional Canadian football wide receiver who played for seven seasons for the Hamilton Tiger-Cats, Ottawa Rough Riders, Edmonton Eskimos, and BC Lions. He was drafted first overall in the 1991 CFL draft by the Hamilton Tiger-Cats. He played college football for the Simon Fraser Clan.
