= Burtland Cummings =

Canadian football player (born 1965)

No. 7, 4, 21
- Position: Defensive back

Personal information
- Born: November 19, 1965 (age 61); London, England
- Listed height: 5 ft 8 in (1.73 m)
- Listed weight: 175 lb (79 kg)

Career information
- College: North Dakota
- CFL draft: 1988: 4th round, 27th overall pick

Career history
- 1989: Hamilton Tiger-Cats*
- 1989–1991: Winnipeg Blue Bombers
- 1993: Ottawa Rough Riders
- 1993: BC Lions
- * Offseason or practice squad member only

Awards and highlights
- Grey Cup champion (1990)

Burtland "Burt" Cummings (born November 19, 1965) is a Canadian former professional football defensive back who played four seasons in the Canadian Football League (CFL) with the Winnipeg Blue Bombers, Ottawa Rough Riders and BC Lions. He was selected by the Hamilton Tiger-Cats in the fourth round of the 1988 CFL draft after playing college football at the University of North Dakota.

== Early life and college ==
Burtland Cummings was born on November 19, 1965, in London, England but grew up in Winnipeg, Manitoba, Canada. He played college football for the North Dakota Fighting Sioux of the University of North Dakota from 1986 to 1988. He was a two-year letterman in 1986 and 1988. He was mostly a wide receiver in college but also spent a year at defensive back.

== Professional career ==
Cummings was selected by the Hamilton Tiger-Cats in the fourth round, with the 27th overall pick, of the 1988 CFL draft but returned to college for his final season. He signed with the Tiger-Cats after his senior year but was later released in early July 1989 before the start of the 1989 CFL season. He was a wide receiver during his time in Hamilton.

Cummings signed with the Winnipeg Blue Bombers of the CFL in 1989. He played in four games for the Blue Bombers during the 1989 season as a defensive back, posting 12 tackles and recovering one fumble. He signed a multi-year contract with the team on May 10, 1990. He appeared in two games in 1990 and made two tackles. On November 25, 1990, the Blue Bombers beat the Edmonton Eskimos in the 78th Grey Cup by a score of 50–11. Cummings played in 12 games during the 1991 season, totaling one defensive tackle, nine special teams tackles, five kick returns for 71 yards, and six punt returns for 16 yards. He was transferred to the injured list in early July 1992. He was taken off the injured list on August 3, 1992, but did not play in any games for the Blue Bombers during the 1992 season.

The Blue Bombers "transferred" Cummings to the BC Lions in early July 1993. He played in three games for the Lions in 1993 but did not record any statistics.

On September 1, 1993, it was reported that Cummings had been traded to the Ottawa Rough Riders for Michael Allen. Cummings appeared in six games for the Rough Riders during the 1993 season, totaling five defensive tackles, three special teams tackles, one interception, and one fumble recovery.

== Coaching career ==
Cummings later became a cornerbacks coach and special teams assistant for the Simon Fraser Red Leafs of Simon Fraser University.
