= 1988 CFL draft =

Canadian football draft

The 1988 CFL draft composed of eight rounds where 64 Canadian football players were chosen from eligible Canadian universities and Canadian players playing in the NCAA. This was the first draft not to feature a Montreal franchise, as the Alouettes had folded just before the start of the 1987 regular season. This was also the first national draft to feature only eight teams.

== 1st round ==
= CFL Division All-Star	= CFL All-Star	= Hall of Famer

Pick #	CFL team	Player	Position	School
1	Ottawa Rough Riders	Orville Lee	RB	Simon Fraser
2	Saskatchewan Roughriders	Jeff Fairholm	WR/SB	Arizona
3	Winnipeg Blue Bombers	Dan Wicklum	LB	Guelph
4	Calgary Stampeders	Poly Georganos	T	Bishop's
5	Winnipeg Blue Bombers	Ryan Hanson	RB	Slippery Rock
6	Saskatchewan Roughriders	Pete Giftopoulos	LB	Penn State
7	BC Lions	Tony Martino	P	Kent State
8	Edmonton Eskimos	Brian Forde	LB	Washington State

== 2nd round ==
= CFL Division All-Star	= CFL All-Star	= Hall of Famer

Pick #	CFL team	Player	Position	School
9	Saskatchewan Roughriders	Ken Evraire	WR	Wilfrid Laurier
10	Saskatchewan Roughriders	Peter Mangold	FB	Western Ontario
11	Hamilton Tiger-Cats	Tim Lorenz	DE	California State
12	Calgary Stampeders	Chris Bleue	SB	Washburn
13	Calgary Stampeders	Wayne Yearwood	WR	West Virginia
14	BC Lions	Dave Vankoughnett	C	Boise State
15	Toronto Argonauts	Paul Masotti	WR	Acadia
16	Edmonton Eskimos	Branko Vincic	DE/DT	Eastern Michigan

== 3rd round ==
= CFL Division All-Star	= CFL All-Star	= Hall of Famer

Pick #	CFL team	Player	Position	School
17	Winnipeg Blue Bombers	Brian Wise	DE	Utah
18	Saskatchewan Roughriders	Jim Jauch	DB	North Carolina
19	Hamilton Tiger-Cats	Shawn Daniels	FB	Bowling Green
20	Calgary Stampeders	Mark McLoughlin	K	South Dakota
21	Winnipeg Blue Bombers	Rob Crifo	WR/QB	Toronto
22	Ottawa Rough Riders	Leon Hatziioannou	DL	Simon Fraser
23	Toronto Argonauts	Tommy Kane	WR	Syracuse
24	Edmonton Eskimos	Greg Nyte	S	Simon Fraser

== 4th round ==
25. Winnipeg Blue Bombers Brad Tierney OL Acadia

26. Ottawa Rough Riders Sheridon Baptiste WR/HB Queen's

27. Hamilton Tiger-Cats Burt Cummings WR/CB North Dakota

28. Calgary Stampeders Wally Zatylny WR Bishop's

29. Winnipeg Blue Bombers Michael Allen CB/RB Carleton

30. British Columbia Lions Warren Robinson T York

31. Toronto Argonauts Floyd Salazar CB/HB McGill

32. Edmonton Eskimos Todd Middleton ILB Dickinson State

== 5th round ==
33. Ottawa Rough Riders Sieg Will T/DE Guelph

34. Ottawa Rough Riders Christopher Rick OLB Queen's

35. Hamilton Tiger-Cats Jeff MacDonald S New Mexico State

36. Calgary Stampeders Jeff Yausie TB Saskatchewan

37. Saskatchewan Roughriders John Hoffman TB/P Saskatchewan

38. British Columbia Lions Carl Ljungberg P/K Guelph

39. Toronto Argonauts Chris Munford S Simon Fraser

40. Edmonton Eskimos Greg Kratzer WR Dickinson State

== 6th round ==
41. Ottawa Rough Riders Brent Matich P/K Calgary

42. Saskatchewan Roughriders Darrell Harle T Eastern Michigan

43. Hamilton Tiger-Cats John Yach OLB/DE Queen's

44. Calgary Stampeders Steve Watts CB/S Toronto

45. Winnipeg Blue Bombers Matt Fitzpatrick DE British Columbia

46. British Columbia Lions Dave Johnson LB Simon Fraser

47. Toronto Argonauts Tim Karbonick SB/TE Calgary

48. Edmonton Eskimos Terry Ainge TB British Columbia

== 7th round ==
49. Ottawa Rough Riders Scott Warr T McGill

50. Saskatchewan Roughriders Hugh Alexander T Utah

51. Hamilton Tiger-Cats Bob Frenkel NG Arizona State

52. Calgary Stampeders Jordan Gagner QB British Columbia

53. Winnipeg Blue Bombers Rob Deluca P/K McMaster

54. British Columbia Lions Tony Mandarich T Michigan State

55. Toronto Argonauts Frank Paradiso ILB York

56. Edmonton Eskimos Stephen Kasowski P/K/WR Alberta

== 8th round ==
57. Ottawa Rough Riders Ray Goerke T Weber State

58. Saskatchewan Roughriders Floyd Collins TB Boise State

59. Hamilton Tiger-Cats Michael Carrier TB Western Kentucky

60. Calgary Stampeders Ian James OLD Calgary

61. Winnipeg Blue Bombers Jim Taplin FB Acadia

62. British Columbia Lions Tom Vlasic TE British Columbia

63. Toronto Argonauts Jamie Williamson HB York

64. Edmonton Eskimos Neil Ferguson DB Alberta
