= Bob Torrance (Canadian football) =

Canadian gridiron football player (1968–2012)

No. 16, 19
- Position: Quarterback

Personal information
- Born: June 4, 1968 (age 58); Calgary, Alberta, Canada
- Died: January 10, 2012 (aged 43); St. John's, Newfoundland, Canada
- Listed height: 6 ft 1 in (1.85 m)
- Listed weight: 207 lb (94 kg)

Career information
- High school: William Aberhart (Calgary)
- University: Calgary (1987–1990)
- NFL draft: 1991: undrafted
- CFL draft: 1991: 3rd round, 22nd overall pick

Career history
- Calgary Stampeders (1991–1993); Hamilton Tiger-Cats (1993); Saskatchewan Roughriders (1995); Calgary Stampeders (1995)

Awards and highlights
- Grey Cup champion (1992); Vanier Cup champion (1988); 3× Second-team All-Canadian (1988–1990); 3× Canada West All-Star (1988–1990)

Career CFL statistics
- Games played: 38
- Passing completions: 81
- Passing attempts: 156
- Completion percentage: 51.9
- TD–INT: 3–12
- Passing yards: 870
- Rushing yards: 69

Robert Torrance (born June 4, 1968 – January 10, 2012) was a Canadian professional football quarterback for the Calgary Stampeders and Hamilton Tiger-Cats of the Canadian Football League (CFL). He played CIAU football for the Calgary Dinos.

== Early life ==
Torrance was born on June 4, 1968, in Calgary, Alberta, Canada. He attended William Aberhart High School in Calgary.

== University career ==
Torrance played CIAU football for the Calgary Dinos from 1987 to 1990. At Calgary, he was a three-time Canada West All-Star and All-Canadian from 1988 to 1990. Torrance threw for more than 6,500 yards and 49 touchdowns in his career and won the 24th Vanier Cup in his first season as a starter.

== Professional career ==
=== Calgary Stampeders (first stint) ===
Torrance was selected in the third round, with the 22nd overall selection, by the Calgary Stampeders in the 1991 CFL draft. He also entered the 1991 NFL draft after the Seattle Seahawks, San Diego Chargers and New York Jets showed interest. Ultimately, he went unselected in the NFL draft and signed his rookie contract with the Stampeders.

In his first two seasons at Calgary, he dressed in 24 games as a backup quarterback, only attempting four passes for 33 yards and -2 rushing yards. Torrance was a member of the Stampeders as the team won the 80th Grey Cup. On June 29, 1993, he was released by the team.

=== Hamilton Tiger-Cats ===
On July 12, 1993, Torrance signed with the Hamilton Tiger-Cats. On July 23, he was moved to the practice roster. On August 23, Torrance was elevated to the active roster. On August 25, he became the first Canadian quarterback to start a game since Greg Vavra did so in 1987. Torrance went 24 of 42 passing for 264 yards and three interceptions in a blowout loss to the Edmonton Eskimos. He played in 11 games, for the Tiger-Cats, completing 78 of 152 passes for 837 yards, three touchdowns and 12 interceptions with 71 rushing yards. In 1994, he was the third-string quarterback on the practice roster and left the team on August 17.

=== Saskatchewan Roughriders ===
On May 14, 1995, Torrance signed with the Saskatchewan Roughriders. On June 26, he was released and signed to the practice roster the following day. On July 18, Torrance was released by the team.

=== Calgary Stampeders (second stint) ===
On August 30, 1995, Torrance signed with the Calgary Stampeders. He dressed in three games as a backup and saw no playing time on the field. Torrance became a free agent at the end of the season.

== Later life ==
After his playing career ended, Torrance moved to St. John's, Newfoundland with his family. He died on January 10, 2012, from a blood infection that took over his lungs and heart.
