= 1991 Edmonton Eskimos season =

Canadian football team season

- General manager: Hugh Campbell
- Head coach: Ron Lancaster
- Home stadium: Commonwealth Stadium

Results
- Record: 12–6
- Division place: 1st, West
- Playoffs: Lost West Final

The 1991 Edmonton Eskimos finished in first place in the West Division with a 12–6 record. The club attempted to win their 11th Grey Cup championship, but lost the West Final 38-36 to the Calgary Stampeders.

== Offseason ==
=== CFL draft ===
Round	Pick	Player	Position	School
1	3	Dan Murphy	DB	Acadia
2	15	Christian Masotti	WR	McGill
3	23	John Davis	DB	Western Ontario
4	25	Gordon Walker	DB	Manitoba
4	30	Ron Herman	G	Queen's
4	31	Cam Brosseau	LB	Eastern Illinois
5	39	Mike Purcell	DL	Calgary
6	47	Mark Houlder	LB	York
7	55	Todd Herget	LB	BYU
8	63	James Gardner	WR	Simon Fraser

== Preseason ==
Game	Date	Opponent	Results		Venue	Attendance
Game	Date	Opponent	Score	Record	Venue	Attendance
A	Thu, June 27	vs BC Lions	W 31–10	1–0	Commonwealth Stadium	31,029
B	Tue, July 2	at Calgary Stampeders	L 21–25	1–1	McMahon Stadium	32,649

== Regular season ==
=== Season standings ===
West Division
Pos	Team	Pld	W	L	T	PF	PA	PD	Pts	Div	Stk
1	Edmonton Eskimos (C, Q)	18	12	6	0	671	569	102	24	7–3	W2
2	Calgary Stampeders (Q)	18	11	7	0	596	552	44	22	6–4	W1
3	BC Lions (Q)	18	11	7	0	661	587	74	22	5–5	L1
4	Saskatchewan Roughriders	18	6	12	0	606	710	−104	12	3–7	L2

Source: "CFL.ca - Official Site of the Canadian Football League". Archived from the original on 2009-09-23.
(C) First round bye; (Q) Qualified for playoffs

=== Season schedule ===
Game	Date	Opponent	Results		Venue	Attendance
Game	Date	Opponent	Score	Record	Venue	Attendance
1	July 12	at Saskatchewan Roughriders	W 34–25	1–0	Taylor Field	
2	July 17	vs Ottawa Rough Riders	W 40–33	2–0	Commonwealth Stadium	
3	July 25	at BC Lions	L 36–37	2–1	BC Place	
4	July 31	vs. Saskatchewan Roughriders	W 54–24	3–1	Commonwealth Stadium	
5	Aug 10	at Hamilton Tiger-Cats	W 38–13	4–1	Ivor Wynne Stadium	
6	Aug 15	at Ottawa Rough Riders	L 35–36	4–2	Lansdowne Park	
7	Aug 21	vs. Toronto Argonauts	W 53–39	5–2	Commonwealth Stadium	
8	Aug 28	vs. Saskatchewan Roughriders	L 41–44	5–3	Commonwealth Stadium	
9	Sept 2	at Calgary Stampeders	L 36–48	5–4	McMahon Stadium	
10	Sept 6	vs. Calgary Stampeders	W 51–37	6–4	Commonwealth Stadium	
11	Sept 15	at Saskatchewan Roughriders	W 41–36	7–4	Taylor Field	
12	Sept 21	at Toronto Argonauts	L 28–47	7–5	SkyDome	
13	Sept 27	vs. Winnipeg Blue Bombers	W 31–15	8–5	Commonwealth Stadium	
14	Oct 4	vs. Hamilton Tiger-Cats	W 18–17	9–5	Commonwealth Stadium	
15	Oct 12	at BC Lions	W 45–38 (OT)	10–5	BC Place	
16	Oct 20	vs. BC Lions	L 38–39 (OT)	10–6	Commonwealth Stadium	
17	Oct 27	vs. Calgary Stampeders	W 24–23	11–6	Commonwealth Stadium	
18	Nov 3	at Winnipeg Blue Bombers	W 28–18	12–6	Winnipeg Stadium	

== Postseason ==
=== Schedule ===
Round	Date	Opponent	Results		Venue	Attendance
Round	Date	Opponent	Score	Record	Venue	Attendance
West Final	Sun, Nov 17	vs. Calgary Stampeders	L 36–38	0–1	Commonwealth Stadium	30,142

=== West Final ===
Team	Q1	Q2	Q3	Q4	Total
Calgary Stampeders	7	8	3	20	38
Edmonton Eskimos	14	12	7	3	36

== Roster ==
1991 Edmonton Eskimos final roster
Quarterbacks: 8 Tracy Ham; 6 Warren Jones; 15 Tom Muecke; Running backs: 83 Chris Johnstone; 22 Blake Marshall; 32 Michael Soles; 26 Reggie Taylor; 34 Brian Walling; Receivers: 77 Chris Armstrong; 27 Marco Cyncar; 33 Craig Ellis; 75 Christian Masotti; 7 Jim Sandusky; 88 Joe Weinberg; 2 Gizmo Williams	Offensive linemen: 57 Randy Ambrosie G; 66 Trevor Bowles T; 67 Rod Connop C; 68 Mike Derks T; 50 Blake Dermott T; 53 Mike Dumaresq C; 56 Steve Krupey G; 54 Pierre Vercheval G; Defensive linemen: 94 Michel Bourgeau NT; 96 Rob Davidson NT; 40 Bennie Goods DE; 43 Jed Roberts DE; 91 Brett Williams DE; Special teams: 5 Dean Dorsey K; 18 Glenn Harper P	Linebackers: 30 Danny Bass; 89 Leroy Blugh; 38 Darrell Corbin; 45 Mike McLean; 39 Willie Pless; 47 Larry Wruck; Defensive backs: 16 Mike Babb; 28 Trent Brown; 29 Enis Jackson; 11 Stephen Jordan; 10 Damion Lyons; 13 Mark Mathis; 3 Danny Murphy; 14 Doug Parrish; 19 David Shelton; 17 Eddie Lee Thomas; Italics indicate American player
