= Dan Farthing =

Canadian gridiron football player (born 1969)

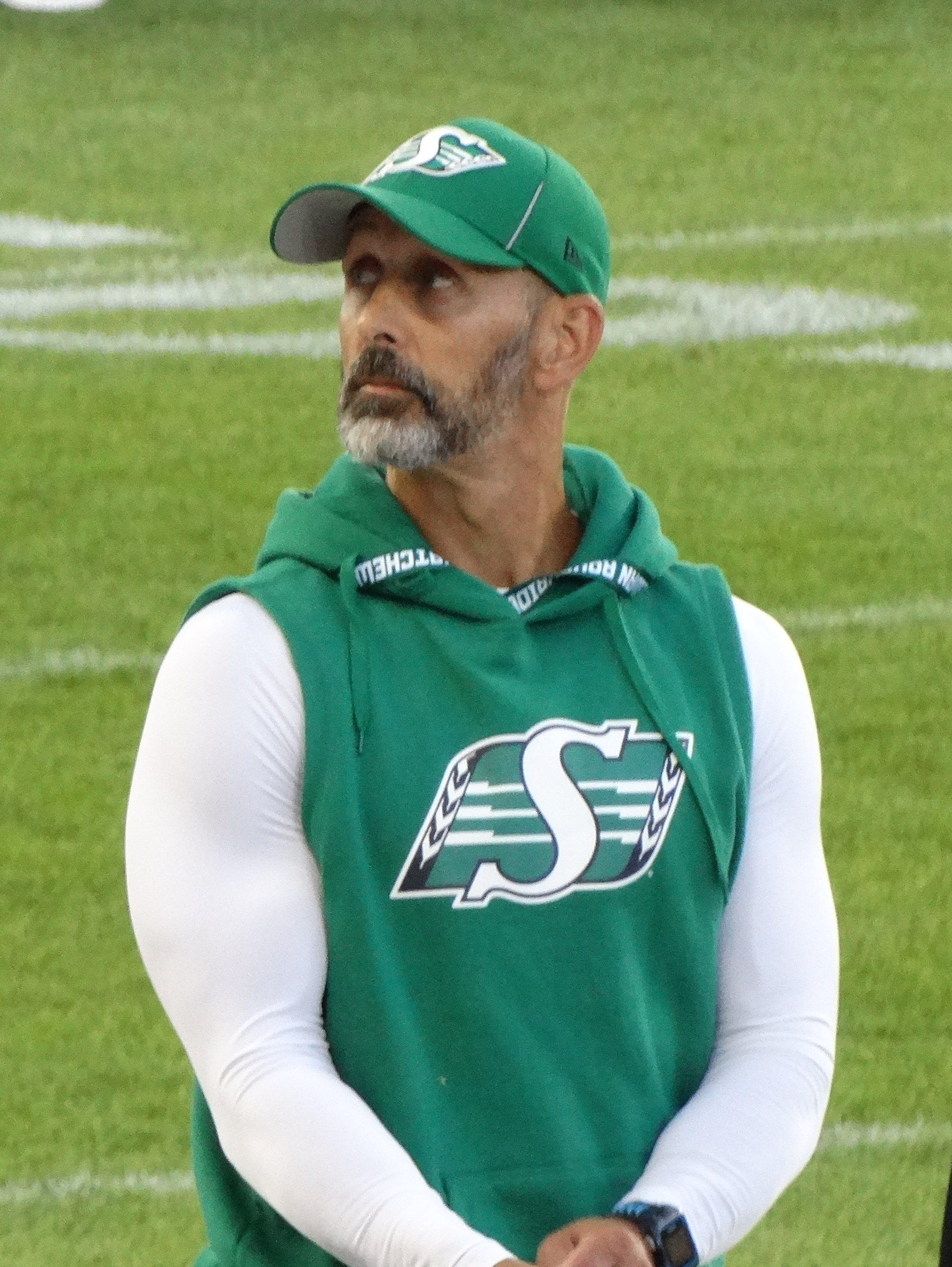
- Farthing with the Saskatchewan Roughriders in 2024

Saskatchewan Roughriders
- Positions: Head strength and conditioning coach
- Roster status: Active
- CFL status: National

Personal information
- Born: November 10, 1969 (age 56); Saskatoon, Saskatchewan, Canada
- Listed height: 5 ft 11 in (1.80 m)
- Listed weight: 190 lb (86 kg)

Career information
- University: Saskatchewan
- CFL draft: 1991: 1st round, 2nd overall pick

Career history

Playing
- 1991–2001: Saskatchewan Roughriders

Coaching
- 2024–present: Saskatchewan Roughriders

Awards and highlights
- Peter Gorman Trophy Winner (1987)

Dan Farthing (born November 10, 1969) is a Canadian former professional football wide receiver and is the current head strength and conditioning coach for the Saskatchewan Roughriders of the Canadian Football League (CFL). As a player, he played in 11 seasons, all with the Roughriders, and has the fourth-most receptions in franchise history.

== University career ==
Farthing played CIAU football for the Saskatchewan Huskies from 1987 to 1990. In his first season, he won the Peter Gorman Trophy as the CIAU rookie of the year. In 1988, he led the country in receiving with 756 yards and was named the Canada West Most Valuable Player. In his fourth year with the team, in 1990, Farthing won the national championship as the Huskies defeated the Saint Mary's Huskies 24–21 in the 26th Vanier Cup.

== Professional career ==
Farthing was drafted in the first round, second overall, in the 1991 CFL draft by the Saskatchewan Roughriders. He played for the Roughriders from 1991 to 2001 where he played in 169 games, recording 384 receptions, 5,097 receiving yards, 19 touchdowns, and 34 special teams tackles.

== Coaching career ==
Farthing served as the strength and conditioning co-ordinator for the Saskatchewan Roughriders from 2012 to 2015. He won his first Grey Cup in 2013 following the team's victory in the 101st Grey Cup game. On December 21, 2023, it was announced that Farthing had been hired by the Saskatchewan Roughriders to serve as the team's head of strength and conditioning.

== Personal life ==
Farthing and his wife, SueAnn, have three children.
