= Orville Lee =

Canadian football player (born 1964)

Profile
- Position: Running back

Personal information
- Born: April 4, 1964 (age 62); Ocho Rios, Jamaica
- Listed height: 5 ft 11 in (1.80 m)
- Listed weight: 200 lb (91 kg)

Career information
- College: Simon Fraser Clan
- CFL draft: 1988: 1st round, 1st overall pick

Career history
- 1988–90: Ottawa Rough Riders
- 1990–91: Saskatchewan Roughriders
- 1992: Hamilton Tiger-Cats

Awards and highlights
- Most Outstanding Rookie (1988); Lew Hayman Trophy (1988); CFL East All-Star (1988)

Orville Lee (born April 4, 1964) is a retired Canadian Football League running back.

He was drafted by the Ottawa Rough Riders with the first overall pick in the 1988 CFL draft from Simon Fraser University. While at university from 1984 to 1987, Orville "rushed for a school record 3,446 career yards and held 14 other SFU records when his four-year career had ended." He was enshrined in the Simon Fraser University Athletics Hall of Fame in 1994.

In his rookie year he racked up 1075 rushing yards to lead the CFL becoming only the fifth Canadian (Normie Kwong, Gerry James, Bob Swift and Ron Stewart being the others) to accomplish that feat. He later played for the Saskatchewan Roughriders and Hamilton Tiger-Cats before retiring in 1992. His son, Jamall Lee was a member of the BC Lions.

He now runs a non-profit organization called Pathfinder Youth Center Society, for at Risk Kids in BC along with his wife Ruth Lee.

== Career regular season rushing statistics ==
CFL statistics			Rushing				
Year	Team	GP	Rush	Yards	Y/R	Lg	TD
1988	Ottawa Rough Riders	18	232	1075	4.6	61	2
1989	Ottawa Rough Riders	16	137	398	2.9	22	0
1990	Ottawa Rough Riders	4	8	17	2.1	7	0
1990	Saskatchewan Roughriders	13	22	130	5.9	40	2
1991	Saskatchewan Roughriders	5	25	68	2.7	12	1
1992	Hamilton Tiger Cats	18	120	416	3.5	28	5
	CFL totals	74	544	2104	3.9	61	10
