= Brendan Rogers (Canadian football) =

Canadian gridiron football player (born 1968)

No. 35
- Positions: Linebacker, Defensive back

Personal information
- Born: February 25, 1968 (age 58); Vancouver, British Columbia, Canada
- Listed height: 6 ft 1 in (1.85 m)
- Listed weight: 235 lb (107 kg)

Career information
- College: Eastern Washington
- CFL draft: 1991: 4th round, 32nd overall pick

Career history
- 1991–1995: Winnipeg Blue Bombers
- 1996: BC Lions*
- 1996–1998: Toronto Argonauts
- 1999: BC Lions*
- 1999: Saskatchewan Roughriders
- * Offseason or practice squad member only

Awards and highlights
- 2× Grey Cup champion (1996, 1997); CFL single game record for special teams tackles (7) (1994)

Career statistics
- Games played: 134
- ST Tackles: 176
- Def Tackles: 27
- Sacks: 2

Brendan Rogers (born February 25, 1968) is a Canadian retired professional football linebacker and defensive back who played for nine years in the Canadian Football League (CFL). He was drafted in the fourth round, 32nd overall by the Winnipeg Blue Bombers in the 1991 CFL draft. He played in five seasons with the Blue Bombers and tied a CFL record in 1994 for most special teams tackles in a single game with seven. Rogers played in four Grey Cup championship games, winning twice with the Toronto Argonauts in 1996 and 1997. He finished his career with the Saskatchewan Roughriders and, as of 2019, is third all-time in career special teams tackles with 176.

He played college football for the Eastern Washington Eagles.
