= Brent Matich =

Canadian football player (born 1966)

Profile
- Positions: Punter, Kicker

Personal information
- Born: December 5, 1966 (age 59); Calgary, Alberta, Canada
- Listed height: 6 ft 1 in (1.85 m)
- Listed weight: 197 lb (89 kg)

Career information
- University: Calgary
- CFL draft: 1988: 6th round, 41st overall pick

Career history
- 1989–1991: Calgary Stampeders
- 1992–1996: Saskatchewan Roughriders

Awards and highlights
- 3× CFL West All-Star (1989, 1990, 1991)

Brent Matich (born December 5, 1966) is a Canadian former professional football punter who played eight seasons in the Canadian Football League (CFL) with the Calgary Stampeders and Saskatchewan Roughriders.
