= Less Browne =

American gridiron football player (born 1959)

No. 00, 15, 17
- Position: Defensive back

Personal information
- Born: December 7, 1959 (age 66); East Liverpool, Ohio, U.S.

Career information
- College: Colorado State

Career history
- 1984: Pittsburgh Maulers
- 1984–1988: Hamilton Tiger-Cats
- 1989–1991: Winnipeg Blue Bombers
- 1992: Ottawa Rough Riders
- 1993–1994: BC Lions

Awards and highlights
- 3× Grey Cup champion (1986, 1990, 1994); 6× CFL All-Star (1985, 1986, 1990, 1991, 1992, 1994); 5× CFL East All-Star (1985, 1986, 1990, 1991, 1992); CFL West All-Star (1994); CFL Records: Most interceptions in a career = 87; Most interception return yards in a career = 1,508
- Canadian Football Hall of Fame (Class of 2002)

Less Browne (born December 7, 1959) is an American former professional football defensive back who played in the United States Football League (USFL) and Canadian Football League (CFL). He was a member of the Pittsburgh Maulers of the USFL, and the Hamilton Tiger-Cats, Winnipeg Blue Bombers, Ottawa Rough Riders and BC Lions of the CFL.

== Professional career ==
Browne originally signed as a pro with the USFL's the Pittsburgh Maulers after being drafted in the 13th round (284th overall) by the expansion club in the 1984 Draft (January 4, 1984).

Browne signed a contract with the Maulers and started the season on their roster, however, was never activated for game action. He was released after the second week of the season by the Maulers on March 6, 1984 and later that spring signed with the CFL Hamilton Tiger-Cats.

Browne holds the CFL and all-pro records for most interceptions in a career with 87. He also holds the record for most interception return yards with 1,508. Browne ranks third in the CFL for career blocked kicks with eight. Browne played in four Grey Cup games (1985, 1986, 1990, and 1994), winning the latter three. He was a six-time CFL All-Star, and was twice runner-up for the CFL's Most Outstanding Defensive Player Award, in 1986 by the Hamilton Tiger-Cats and in 1994 by the BC Lions.

== Post-career ==
He was inducted into the Canadian Football Hall of Fame in 2002 and in November, 2006 was voted one of the CFL's Top 50 players (#23) of the league's modern era by Canadian sports network The Sports Network/TSN.

He later became an assistant coach for the Winnipeg Blue Bombers.
