= Rob Crifo =

Canadian football player (born 1965)

No. 79
- Positions: Wide receiver, Running back, Slotback

Personal information
- Born: November 10, 1965 (age 61); Toronto, Ontario, Canada
- Listed height: 6 ft 6 in (1.98 m)
- Listed weight: 215 lb (98 kg)

Career information
- University: Toronto
- CFL draft: 1988: 3rd round, 21st overall pick

Career history
- 1989–1993: Winnipeg Blue Bombers
- 1993–1994: Ottawa Rough Riders
- 1994: Saskatchewan Roughriders
- 1994–1995: Toronto Argonauts
- 1996: Montreal Alouettes*
- 1996: Hamilton Tiger-Cats
- * Offseason or practice squad member only

Awards and highlights
- Grey Cup champion (1990); 2× CFL East All-Star (1991, 1992)

Career CFL statistics
- Receptions: 173
- Receiving yards: 2,906
- Receiving TDs: 16

Robert Crifo (born November 10, 1965) is a Canadian former professional football wide receiver who played eight seasons in the Canadian Football League (CFL) with the Winnipeg Blue Bombers, Ottawa Rough Riders, Saskatchewan Roughriders, Toronto Argonauts and Hamilton Tiger-Cats. He was drafted by the Winnipeg Blue Bombers in the third round of the 1988 CFL draft. He played CIS football at the University of Toronto. Crifo was also a member of the Montreal Alouettes.

== Professional career ==
Crifo was selected by the Winnipeg Blue Bombers of the CFL with the 21st pick in the 1988 CFL draft. He was named an East All-Star in 1991 after recording 39 receptions. He earned East All-Star honors again in 1992 after recording 53 receptions. Crifo was released by the Blue Bombers in September 1993. He signed with the Ottawa Rough Riders of the CFL in September 1993 and caught 15 passes in seven games. He was traded to the Saskatchewan Roughriders in May 1994 and released by the team in August 1994. Crifo signed with the CFL's Toronto Argonauts in 1994 and became a free agent after the 1995 season. He was signed by the Montreal Alouettes of the CFL prior to the 1996 season and released by the team in June 1996. He signed with the CFL's Hamilton Tiger-Cats in September 1996 and was released by the team in November 1996.

== Amateur golf career ==
Crifo is an amateur golfer for the Cedar Brae Golf Club.
