= Jon Volpe =

American gridiron football player (born 1968)

Profile
- Position: Running back

Personal information
- Born: April 17, 1968 (age 58); Kincheloe, Michigan, U.S.

Career information
- College: Stanford

Career history
- 1991–1993: BC Lions
- 1994: Las Vegas Posse

Awards and highlights
- 2× Eddie James Memorial Trophy (1991, 1992); CFL's Most Outstanding Rookie Award (1991); Jackie Parker Trophy (1991); 2× CFL East All-Star (1991, 1992); First-team All-Pac-10 (1988)

Jon Volpe (born April 17, 1968) is an American former professional Canadian football running back in the Canadian Football League (CFL).

== Early life ==
Volpe had a difficult childhood. His father left when he was 5 years old, his mother was an alcoholic and lived on the street, and his brother went to jail several times. Jon Volpe, being only 5 feet 7 inches tall, received a football scholarship to Stanford University, where he was an all-conference running back (leading in rushing yards), earning GTE Academic All-American honors and being named a Rhodes Scholar nominee (while getting a BSc in engineering.)

== Professional career ==
He was not drafted by the NFL. However, he had a tryout with the Pittsburgh Steelers before he headed to Canada to play for the B.C. Lions. He had a successful rookie season in 1991; rushing behind Doug Flutie (who threw for a record 6,619 yards), Volpe added 1,395 rushing yards and led the league with 16 rushing touchdowns and 20 total touchdowns. Volpe was named an All-Star and won the CFL's Most Outstanding Rookie Award. In 1992, he added 941 yards and 13 touchdowns, and was again named an All-Star. A contract dispute meant a late start to the 1993 season and he had a generally unsuccessful season, appearing in only five games. He left the Lions after three years and 36 games.

Volpe moved to the expansion Las Vegas Posse in 1994, rushing 43 times for 182 yards and 3 touchdowns in four games. He signed with the Pittsburgh Steelers in 1995, but a preseason shoulder injury ended his career.

== Private life ==
Volpe is chairman and CEO of Nova Home Loans. He is married to Heather and has a daughter, Kaylie, and a son, Trevor.
