= Irv Daymond =

Canadian football player (born 1962)

No. 54
- Positions: Center, Guard, Offensive tackle

Personal information
- Born: October 9, 1962 (age 64); St. Thomas, Ontario, Canada
- Listed height: 6 ft 5 in (1.96 m)
- Listed weight: 265 lb (120 kg)

Career information
- University: Western Ontario
- CFL draft: 1984: 6th round, 53rd overall pick

Career history
- 1986–1995: Ottawa Rough Riders

Awards and highlights
- 2× CFL East All-Star (1991, 1992)

Irv Daymond (born October 9, 1962) is a Canadian former professional football player who was an offensive lineman for ten seasons with the Ottawa Rough Riders of the Canadian Football League. He became the offensive line coach at Wilfrid Laurier University in Waterloo, Ontario.
