= Mike Campbell (Canadian football) =

Canadian gridiron football player (born 1965)

Profile
- Position: Defensive end

Personal information
- Born: September 19, 1965 (age 61); North York, Ontario, Canada

Career information
- College: Slippery Rock
- CFL draft: 1989: 2nd round, 10th overall pick

Career history
- 1989–1994: Toronto Argonauts
- 1995–1999: Hamilton Tiger-Cats

Awards and highlights
- 2× Grey Cup champion (1991, 1999); CFL All-Star (1991); 2× CFL East All-Star (1991, 1992)

Mike Campbell (born September 19, 1965) was a defensive end who played ten seasons in the Canadian Football League (CFL), winning a Grey Cup and CFL All-Star selection in 1991 whilst playing for Toronto Argonauts.
