= Darryl Ford =

American gridiron football player (born 1966)

No. 21, 94, 97, 48, 26
- Position: Linebacker

Personal information
- Born: June 22, 1966 (age 60); Dallas, Texas, U.S.
- Listed height: 6 ft 1 in (1.85 m)
- Listed weight: 225 lb (102 kg)

Career information
- High school: Franklin D. Roosevelt (Dallas)
- College: New Mexico State
- NFL draft: 1989: undrafted

Career history
- Dallas Cowboys (1989)*; Toronto Argonauts (1990–1991); Detroit Lions (1992)*; Pittsburgh Steelers (1992); Detroit Lions (1992–1993); Atlanta Falcons (1994); Memphis Mad Dogs (1995); Saskatchewan Roughriders (1996)
- * Offseason or practice squad member only

Awards and highlights
- Grey Cup champion (1991); CFL All-Star (1991); First-team All-Big West (1988)

Career CFL statistics
- Tackles: 252
- Sacks: 4
- Interceptions: 5
- Stats at Pro Football Reference

Darryl Ford (born June 22, 1966) is an American former football linebacker who played in the National Football League (NFL) and the Canadian Football League (CFL). He played college football at New Mexico State.

== Early life ==
Ford was born and grew up in Dallas, Texas. Ford attended Franklin D. Roosevelt High School. He did not play organized football until his sophomore season. As a senior, he recorded 50 sacks and four interceptions. He received All-district honors and was named to The Dallas Morning News All Star Team.

== College career ==
Ford accepted a football scholarship from New Mexico State University, where he became a four-year starter at outside linebacker. As a freshman in 1984, he had 107 tackles and one interception.

As a sophomore in 1985, he set the school record for tackles in a single-season with 154, while also collecting 6 sacks.

As a junior in 1986, he struggled with injuries and registered 97 tackles. He did not play in 1987 because o academic issues.

As a senior in 1988, he started all 11 games and broke his school record for tackles in a season with 164, while making 6 sacks. He received All-Big West Conference honors and finished his collegiate career as the school's All-time leading tackler (511).

== Professional career ==
Ford was signed as an undrafted free agent by the Dallas Cowboys after the 1989 NFL draft. He was released before the start of the season.

In 1990, he was signed by the Toronto Argonauts of the Canadian Football League (CFL). He finished the season with 78 tackles. In 1991, he led the league with 155 tackles. He also had 3 sacks, 3 interceptions and received CFL All-Star honors. He tallied 9 tackles and 2 quarterback sacks in the Argonauts' Grey Cup Championship victory over the Calgary Stampeders.

In 1992, he was picked up by the Detroit Lions and was signed to the practice squad after being released at the end of the preseason.

On September 22, 1992, he was signed by the Pittsburgh Steelers from the Lions' practice squad. He played in 8 games before being waived on December 26.

In 1992, he was re-signed by the Detroit Lions and played in the season finale against the San Francisco 49ers. In 1993, he played in 11 games before being released on December 10.

On May 12, 1994, Ford was signed by the Atlanta Falcons and spent the entire season with the team.

In 1995, Ford was signed by the Memphis Mad Dogs, formed as part of the CFL's attempted expansion into the United States. He spent the 1996 season with the Saskatchewan Roughriders.
