= Leon Hatziioannou =

Canadian football player (born 1965)

No. 43, 44
- Position: Defensive lineman

Personal information
- Born: March 28, 1965 (age 61); Toronto, Ontario, Canada
- Listed height: 6 ft 1 in (1.85 m)
- Listed weight: 255 lb (116 kg)

Career information
- High school: North Toronto
- University: Simon Fraser
- CFL draft: 1988: 3rd round, 22nd overall pick

Career history
- 1988: Ottawa Rough Riders
- 1988–1993: Winnipeg Blue Bombers
- 1994–1995: Toronto Argonauts

Awards and highlights
- 2× Grey Cup champion (1988, 1990)

Leon Hatziioannou (Hat-zee-AH-no; born March 28, 1965) is a Canadian former professional football defensive lineman who played eight seasons in the Canadian Football League (CFL) with the Ottawa Rough Riders, Winnipeg Blue Bombers and Toronto Argonauts. He was selected by the Rough Riders in the third round of the 1988 CFL draft after playing college football at Simon Fraser University.

== Early life ==
Leon Hatziioannou was born on March 28, 1965, in Toronto. He attended North Toronto High School. Hatziioannou played college football for the Simon Fraser Clan of Simon Fraser University, with his final year being in 1987.

== Professional career ==
Hatziioannou was selected by the Ottawa Rough Riders in the third round, with the 22nd overall pick, of the 1988 CFL draft. He dressed in five games for the Rough Riders during the 1988 season.

On Saturday October 15, 1988, Hatziioannou received a call from Winnipeg Blue Bombers head coach Mike Riley, who had been trying to contact him all day, that he had been traded to Winnipeg. Hatziioannou was the "future considerations" in an earlier Ottawa–Winnipeg trade for Roy Dewalt. Hatziioannou then played for the Blue Bombers in an October 16 Sunday afternoon game after having already played for the Rough Riders in Ottawa's October 14 Friday night game two days earlier. The Winnipeg Sun speculated that he may have been the first CFL player to play for two teams in the same weekend. Hatziioannou won the 76th Grey Cup with the Blue Bombers in 1988 and the 78th Grey Cup in 1990. Overall, he dressed in 85 games for Winnipeg from 1988 to 1993. He was released on June 30, 1994, before the start of the 1994 season.

Hatziioannou was signed to the practice roster of the Toronto Argonauts on July 11, 1994. He was later promoted to the active roster and dressed in 14 games for the Argonauts that year. He dressed in nine games in 1995 and spent part of the season on the injured list. Hatziioannou became a free agent on February 15, 1996, and was not re-signed by Toronto. He finished his CFL career with totals of 113 games dressed, 125 tackles, eight sacks, and four fumble recoveries.
