= Jim Mills (gridiron football) =

Canadian gridiron football player (born 1961)

No. 76, 66
- Position: Offensive tackle

Personal information
- Born: September 23, 1961 (age 65); Vancouver, British Columbia, Canada

Career information
- High school: Richmond
- College: Hawaii
- NFL draft: 1983: 9th round, 225th overall pick
- CFL draft: 1983

Career history
- 1983–1984: Baltimore/Indianapolis Colts
- 1986–1993: BC Lions
- 1994: Ottawa Rough Riders
- 1995: BC Lions

Awards and highlights
- 2× CFL's Most Outstanding Offensive Lineman Award (1990, 1991); 2× DeMarco–Becket Memorial Trophy (1990, 1991); 3× CFL All-Star (1988, 1990, 1991); 6× CFL West All-Star (1988–1993)
- Stats at Pro Football Reference
- Canadian Football Hall of Fame (Class of 2009)

James Anthony Mills (born September 23, 1961) is a former gridiron football offensive lineman.

After graduating from Richmond Senior Secondary School in 1979, he played for the University of Hawaii before playing two years in the National Football League (NFL) for the Baltimore/Indianapolis Colts. He was selected by the Colts in the ninth round (225th overall) of the 1983 NFL Draft. While attending the university, Jim was trained in powerlifting by strength mentor Karl Holfeld. After his NFL career he headed to the Canadian Football League (CFL), where he played numerous seasons including with his hometown team the BC Lions. He won the CFL's Most Outstanding Offensive Lineman Award in 1990 and 1991. He was inducted into the Canadian Football Hall of Fame in 2009.
