= Leo Groenewegen =

Canadian football player (born 1965)

No. 59
- Position: Guard

Personal information
- Born: August 13, 1965 (age 61); Vancouver, British Columbia, Canada
- Listed height: 6 ft 5 in (1.96 m)
- Listed weight: 280 lb (127 kg)

Career information
- High school: Notre Dame
- University: British Columbia
- CFL draft: 1987: 1st round, 1st overall pick

Career history
- 1987–1989: Ottawa Rough Riders
- 1989–1993: British Columbia Lions
- 1994–2004: Edmonton Eskimos

Awards and highlights
- Grey Cup champion (2003); 3× CFL All-Star (1991, 1996, 1999); 4× CFL West All-Star (1991, 1996, 1999, 2000); CFL record most consecutive starts for non-kicker (252)

Leo Groenewegen (born August 13, 1965) is a former all-star offensive lineman in the Canadian Football League (CFL). He played from 1987 to 2004 for the Ottawa Rough Riders, British Columbia Lions and Edmonton Eskimos. He was an All-Star three times and won one Grey Cup with Edmonton. He holds the CFL record for consecutive starts by a non-kicker (252). He has been a member of the Volunteer Fire Department in Nanoose Bay, British Columbia since 2008. In April of 2024 he was appointed to the position of Fire Chief.
