= Brian Bonner (linebacker) =

American football player (born 1965)

No. 56
- Position: Linebacker

Personal information
- Born: October 9, 1965 (age 61); Mount Vernon, New York, U.S.

Career information
- High school: Minneapolis (MN) Washburn
- College: Wisconsin; Minnesota
- NFL draft: 1988: 9th round, 247th overall pick

Career history
- 1988: San Francisco 49ers*
- 1988-1989: Washington Redskins
- 1991–1992: Ottawa Rough Riders
- 1993: Saskatchewan Roughriders
- 1993-1994: Ottawa Rough Riders
- 1995: Shreveport Pirates
- * Offseason or practice squad member only

Awards and highlights
- CFL East All-Star (1991)
- Stats at Pro Football Reference

Brian Keith Bonner (born October 9, 1965) is an American former professional football player who was a linebacker for the Washington Redskins of the National Football League (NFL). He played college football for the Wisconsin Badgers and Minnesota Golden Gophers. Bonner was selected by the San Francisco 49ers in the ninth round of the 1988 NFL draft. After concluding his NFL career, Bonner played four seasons for the Ottawa Rough Riders of the Canadian Football League (CFL). He split his final CFL season with the Saskatchewan Roughriders and the Shreveport Pirates.
