= Ray Alexander (gridiron football) =

American gridiron football player (born 1962)

No. 80, 87
- Position: Wide receiver

Personal information
- Born: January 8, 1962 (age 64); Miami, Florida, U.S.
- Listed height: 6 ft 4 in (1.93 m)
- Listed weight: 195 lb (88 kg)

Career information
- High school: Shaw (Mobile, Alabama)
- College: Florida A&M

Career history
- 1984: Denver Broncos
- 1985–1986: Calgary Stampeders
- 1987–1989: Dallas Cowboys
- 1990–1994: BC Lions
- 1995: Ottawa Rough Riders

Awards and highlights
- Grey Cup champion (1994); CFL All-Star (1991); 4× CFL West All-Star (1986, 1990, 1991, 1994); 3× All-MEAC (1981, 1982, 1983); MEAC Offensive Player of the Year (1983)
- Stats at Pro Football Reference

Vernest Raynard Alexander (born January 8, 1962) is an American former professional football wide receiver in the National Football League (NFL) for the Denver Broncos and Dallas Cowboys. He also played eight seasons in the Canadian Football League (CFL) for three teams. He played college football at Florida A&M University.

== Early life ==
Alexander attended John Shaw High School, before moving on to Florida A&M University. He became a starter at wide receiver as a sophomore, posting 38 receptions for 535 yards and one touchdown. The next year, he registered 41 receptions for 941 yards and 10 touchdowns.

He was a dominant player as a senior, earning MEAC offensive player of the year honors, while tallying 57 receptions for 1,079 yards and 9 touchdowns.

Alexander finished his college career with school records for career receptions, career receiving yards (2,632), career touchdown receptions (20), career 100-yard receiving games (6), single-season receiving yards (1,079), single-season receptions (57), single-game receptions, single-game receiving yards and single-game receiving touchdowns (3).

In 1995, he was inducted into the Mid-Eastern Athletic Conference Hall of Fame.

== Professional career ==
=== Denver Broncos ===
Although he was selected by the Tampa Bay Bandits in the 1984 USFL territorial draft, he opted to sign as an undrafted free agent with the Denver Broncos after the 1984 NFL draft. He played as a reserve in 8 games, registering 8 receptions for 132 yards and one touchdown. He was waived on August 26, 1985.

=== Calgary Stampeders ===
In 1986, he signed with the Calgary Stampeders of the Canadian Football League. He was named a starter at wide receiver, registering 88 catches (third in the league) for 1,590 yards (second in the league) and 10 touchdowns, while receiving West All-Star honors.

=== Dallas Cowboys ===
On March 23, 1987, the Dallas Cowboys signed him as a free agent, hoping that his success in Canada could translate into the National Football League. He suffered a broken left wrist during training camp and was placed on the injured reserve list.

The next year, the team lost promising wide receiver Mike Sherrard to injury for a second year in a row and Alexander became a starter in a young receivers corps, that included rookie Michael Irvin. He led the team with 54 catches for 788 yards and 6 touchdowns. Almost a third of his 54 receptions were a first down (11) or a touchdown (5) on third or fourth down situations. He had a career-high 112 yards on 8 receptions against the Philadelphia Eagles. He was released on September 1, 1989, and later re-signed on September 18 to play in two games.

=== BC Lions ===
On March 13, 1990, he returned for a second stint in the Canadian Football League, signing as a free agent with the BC Lions. In his first season back, he recorded 65 receptions for 1,120 yards and his second West All-Star award.

In 1991, he had a career-year with 104 catches for 1,650 yards and received both West and CFL All-Star honors. He was released in June 1992, only to be re-signed in August, finishing with 10 games and 56 receptions for 786 yards.

In 1993, he returned to form with 77 receptions for 1,300 yards and 4 touchdowns. The next year, he recorded 85 catches for 1,234 yards and 6 touchdowns, receiving his last West All-Star nod.

=== Ottawa Rough Riders ===
In 1995, he was signed as a free agent by the Ottawa Rough Riders, posting 59 receptions for 801 yards and 5 touchdowns in 14 games. On March 13, 1996, he was traded back to the BC Lions in exchange for wide receiver Robert Gordon, but never played another game.
