= 1991 CFL season =

Canadian Football League season

- Duration: July 11 – November 3, 1991
- East champions: Toronto Argonauts
- West champions: Calgary Stampeders

79th Grey Cup
- Date: November 24, 1991
- Venue: Winnipeg Stadium, Winnipeg
- Champions: Toronto Argonauts

CFL seasons
- ← 1990 1992 →

Canadian Football League team locations: West, East

The 1991 CFL season is considered to be the 38th season in modern-day Canadian football, although it is officially the 34th Canadian Football League season.

== CFL news in 1991 ==
Harry Ornest sold the Toronto Argonauts to Bruce McNall, Wayne Gretzky and John Candy on Monday, February 25. On Wednesday, July 24, the Board of Directors of the Ottawa Rough Riders resigned, causing the CFL to assume the ownership duties of the franchise, two days later. Three months later, the Rough Riders were sold by the CFL to Bernie and Lonie Glieberman on Saturday, October 19. Furthermore, the Calgary Stampeders was purchased by Larry Ryckman from Stampeder Football Club Limited on Friday, October 24.

All eight clubs combined for a record 64.2 points per game and attendance figures broke the 2 million mark for the tenth time in CFL history (2,001,858). The Grey Cup game was hosted by the city of Winnipeg for the first time on Sunday, November 24. In that game, the Toronto Argonauts defeated the Calgary Stampeders 36–21 in front of 51,985 football fans. The Grey Cup game was also the most-watched Canadian television show with an audience of 3,531,000 viewers.

J. Donald Crump resigned as CFL Commissioner on Tuesday, December 31.

After the shutdown of the Canadian Football Network, this left the CFL with two television outlets: CBC Television, which had coverage for some regular season games and exclusive coverage of all CFL playoff games, including the Grey Cup game, and TSN on cable, airing some regular season games.

== Regular season standings ==
=== Final regular season standings ===
West Division
| Pos | Team | Pld | W | L | T | PF | PA | PD | Pts | Div | Stk |
|---|---|---|---|---|---|---|---|---|---|---|---|
| 1 | Edmonton Eskimos (C, Q) | 18 | 12 | 6 | 0 | 671 | 569 | 102 | 24 | 7–3 | W2 |
| 2 | Calgary Stampeders (Q) | 18 | 11 | 7 | 0 | 596 | 552 | 44 | 22 | 6–4 | W1 |
| 3 | BC Lions (Q) | 18 | 11 | 7 | 0 | 661 | 587 | 74 | 22 | 5–5 | L1 |
| 4 | Saskatchewan Roughriders | 18 | 6 | 12 | 0 | 606 | 710 | −104 | 12 | 3–7 | L2 |

(C) First round bye; (Q) Qualified for playoffs

East Division
| Pos | Team | Pld | W | L | T | PF | PA | PD | Pts | Div | Stk |
|---|---|---|---|---|---|---|---|---|---|---|---|
| 1 | Toronto Argonauts (C, Q) | 18 | 13 | 5 | 0 | 647 | 526 | 121 | 26 | 8–2 | W3 |
| 2 | Winnipeg Blue Bombers (Q) | 18 | 9 | 9 | 0 | 516 | 499 | 17 | 18 | 6–4 | L2 |
| 3 | Ottawa Rough Riders (Q) | 18 | 7 | 11 | 0 | 522 | 577 | −55 | 14 | 5–5 | L1 |
| 4 | Hamilton Tiger-Cats | 18 | 3 | 15 | 0 | 400 | 599 | −199 | 6 | 1–9 | W1 |

(C) First round bye; (Q) Qualified for playoffs

== Grey Cup playoffs ==
The Toronto Argonauts are the 1991 Grey Cup champions, defeating the Calgary Stampeders 36–21, at Winnipeg Stadium. This was the first championship for the Argonauts in eight years. The Argonauts’ Raghib "Rocket" Ismail (WR) was named the Grey Cup's Most Valuable Player and Stampeder's Dave Sapunjis (SB) was the Grey Cup's Most Valuable Canadian.

=== Playoff bracket ===
November 10: Division Semifinals
East
E3 | Ottawa Rough Riders | 8
E2 | Winnipeg Blue Bombers | 26
West
W3 | BC Lions | 41
W2 | Calgary Stampeders | 43

November 17: Division Finals
E2 | Winnipeg Blue Bombers | 3
E1 | Toronto Argonauts | 42
W2 | Calgary Stampeders | 38
W1 | Edmonton Eskimos | 36

November 24: 79th Grey Cup @ Winnipeg Stadium – Winnipeg, MB
E1 | Toronto Argonauts | 36
W2 | Calgary Stampeders | 21

== CFL leaders ==
- CFL passing leaders
- CFL rushing leaders
- CFL receiving leaders

== 1991 CFL All-Stars ==
=== Offence ===
- QB – Doug Flutie, BC Lions
- FB – Blake Marshall, Edmonton Eskimos
- RB – Robert Mimbs, Winnipeg Blue Bombers
- SB – Matt Clark, BC Lions
- SB – Allen Pitts, Calgary Stampeders
- WR – Ray Alexander, BC Lions
- WR – Raghib "Rocket" Ismail, Toronto Argonauts
- C – Rod Connop, Edmonton Eskimos
- OG – Leo Groenewegen, BC Lions
- OG – Dan Ferrone, Toronto Argonauts
- OT – Jim Mills, BC Lions
- OT – Chris Walby, Winnipeg Blue Bombers

=== Defence ===
- DT – Harold Hallman, Toronto Argonauts
- DT – Brett Williams, Edmonton Eskimos
- DE – Will Johnson, Calgary Stampeders
- DE – Mike Campbell, Toronto Argonauts
- LB – Willie Pless, Edmonton Eskimos
- LB – Darryl Ford, Toronto Argonauts
- LB – Greg Battle, Winnipeg Blue Bombers
- CB – Less Browne, Winnipeg Blue Bombers
- CB – Junior Thurman, Calgary Stampeders
- DB – Darryl Hall, Calgary Stampeders
- DB – Don Wilson, Toronto Argonauts
- DS – Glen Suitor, Saskatchewan Roughriders

=== Special teams ===
- P – Hank Ilesic, Toronto Argonauts
- K – Lance Chomyc, Toronto Argonauts
- ST – Henry "Gizmo" Williams, Edmonton Eskimos

== 1991 Eastern All-Stars ==
=== Offence ===
- QB – Damon Allen, Ottawa Rough Riders
- FB – David Conrad, Ottawa Rough Riders
- RB – Robert Mimbs, Winnipeg Blue Bombers
- SB – Rob Crifo, Winnipeg Blue Bombers
- SB – Darrell Smith, Toronto Argonauts
- WR – David Williams, Toronto Argonauts
- WR – Raghib "Rocket" Ismail, Toronto Argonauts
- C – Irv Daymond, Ottawa Rough Riders
- OG – Gerald Roper, Ottawa Rough Riders
- OG – Dan Ferrone, Toronto Argonauts
- OT – Chris Schultz, Toronto Argonauts
- OT – Chris Walby, Winnipeg Blue Bombers

=== Defence ===
- DT – Harold Hallman, Toronto Argonauts
- DT – Lloyd Lewis, Ottawa Rough Riders
- DE – Brian Warren, Toronto Argonauts
- DE – Mike Campbell, Toronto Argonauts
- LB – Brian Bonner, Ottawa Rough Riders
- LB – Darryl Ford, Toronto Argonauts
- LB – Greg Battle, Winnipeg Blue Bombers
- CB – Less Browne, Winnipeg Blue Bombers
- CB – Reggie Pleasant, Toronto Argonauts
- DB – Anthony Drawhorn, Ottawa Rough Riders
- DB – Don Wilson, Toronto Argonauts
- DS – Scott Flagel, Ottawa Rough Riders

=== Special teams ===
- P – Hank Ilesic, Toronto Argonauts
- K – Lance Chomyc, Toronto Argonauts
- ST – Raghib "Rocket" Ismail, Toronto Argonauts

== 1991 Western All-Stars ==
=== Offence ===
- QB – Doug Flutie, BC Lions
- FB – Blake Marshall, Edmonton Eskimos
- RB – Jon Volpe, BC Lions
- SB – Matt Clark, BC Lions
- SB – Allen Pitts, Calgary Stampeders
- WR – Ray Alexander, BC Lions
- WR – Jim Sandusky, Edmonton Eskimos
- C – Rod Connop, Edmonton Eskimos
- OG – Leo Groenewegen, BC Lions
- OG – Roger Aldag, Saskatchewan Roughriders
- OT – Jim Mills, BC Lions
- OT – Vic Stevenson, Saskatchewan Roughriders

=== Defence ===
- DT – Gary Lewis, Saskatchewan Roughriders
- DT – Brett Williams, Edmonton Eskimos
- DE – Will Johnson, Calgary Stampeders
- DE – Stewart Hill, BC Lions
- LB – Willie Pless, Edmonton Eskimos
- LB – O.J. Brigance, BC Lions
- LB – Alondra Johnson, Calgary Stampeders
- CB – Eddie Thomas, Edmonton Eskimos
- CB – Junior Thurman, Calgary Stampeders
- DB – Darryl Hall, Calgary Stampeders
- DB – Enis Jackson, Edmonton Eskimos
- DS – Glen Suitor, Saskatchewan Roughriders

=== Special teams ===
- P – Brent Matich, Calgary Stampeders
- K – Dave Ridgway, Saskatchewan Roughriders
- ST – Henry "Gizmo" Williams, Edmonton Eskimos

== 1991 CFL awards ==
- CFL's Most Outstanding Player Award – Doug Flutie (QB), BC Lions
- CFL's Most Outstanding Canadian Award – Blake Marshall (FB), Edmonton Eskimos
- CFL's Most Outstanding Defensive Player Award – Greg Battle (LB), Winnipeg Blue Bombers
- CFL's Most Outstanding Offensive Lineman Award – Jim Mills (OT), BC Lions
- CFL's Most Outstanding Rookie Award – Jon Volpe (RB), BC Lions
- CFLPA's Outstanding Community Service Award – Stu Laird (LB), Calgary Stampeders
- CFL's Coach of the Year – Adam Rita, Toronto Argonauts
- Commissioner's Award - Jake Matheson, Winnipeg
