= 1992 Hamilton Tiger-Cats season =

Season of Canadian Football League team the Hamilton Tiger-Cats

- Head coach: John Gregory
- Home stadium: Ivor Wynne Stadium

Results
- Record: 11–7
- Division place: 2nd, East
- Playoffs: Lost East Final
- Team MOP: John Motton
- Team MOC: Ken Evraire
- Team MOR: David Lucas

The 1992 Hamilton Tiger-Cats season was the 35th season for the team in the Canadian Football League (CFL) and their 43rd overall. The Tiger-Cats finished in second place in the East Division with an 11–7 record. After defeating the Ottawa Rough Riders in the East Semi-Final, the team appeared in the East Final, but lost to the Winnipeg Blue Bombers.

== Offseason ==
=== CFL draft ===
Rd	Pick	Player	Position	School
2	9	Joey Jauch	WR	North Carolina
3	17	Frank Santorelli	LB	Simon Fraser
3	22	Glen Young	LB	Syracuse
4	25	Rawle Bynoe	DB	Louisville
5	33	Jim Gianakopolous	DE	Colgate
6	41	Brian Johnson	LB	Saint Mary's
7	49	Rickey Henderson	OT	Manitoba
8	57	Andrew Fairbairn	WR	Carleton

== Preseason ==
Week	Date	Opponent	Results		Venue	Attendance
Week	Date	Opponent	Score	Record	Venue	Attendance
A	June 21	vs. Calgary Stampeders	W 20–18	1–0		
C	July 2	at BC Lions	W 31–24	2–0		

== Regular season ==
=== Season standings ===
East Division
Pos	Team	Pld	W	L	T	PF	PA	PD	Pts	Div	Stk
1	Winnipeg Blue Bombers (C, Q)	18	11	7	0	507	499	8	22	7–3	W5
2	Hamilton Tiger-Cats (Q)	18	11	7	0	536	514	22	22	5–5	W2
3	Ottawa Rough Riders (Q)	18	9	9	0	484	439	45	18	6–4	L1
4	Toronto Argonauts	18	6	12	0	469	523	−54	12	3–7	L3

Source: "CFL.ca - Official Site of the Canadian Football League". Archived from the original on 2011-08-10.
(C) First round bye; (Q) Qualified for playoffs

=== Schedule ===
Week	Game	Date	Opponent	Results		Venue	Attendance
Week	Game	Date	Opponent	Score	Record	Venue	Attendance
1	1	July 9	vs. Winnipeg Blue Bombers	L 33–36	0–1		
2	2	July 16	at Calgary Stampeders	L 22–34	0–2		
3	3	July 23	at Toronto Argonauts	W 39–30	1–2		
4	4	July 30	vs. Saskatchewan Roughriders	W 38–24	2–2		
5	5	Aug 6	at BC Lions	W 27–25	3–2		
6	6	Aug 12	vs. Edmonton Eskimos	L 28–30	3–3		
7	7	Aug 19	vs. Winnipeg Blue Bombers	W 21–20	4–3		
8	8	Aug 27	at Winnipeg Blue Bombers	W 37–35	5–3		
9	9	Sept 7	vs. Toronto Argonauts	W 27–24	6–3		
10	10	Sept 13	at Ottawa Rough Riders	L 31–44	6–4		
11	11	Sept 19	vs. Ottawa Rough Riders	L 25–54	6–5		
12	12	Sept 24	at Edmonton Eskimos	W 26–25	7–5		
13	13	Oct 3	vs. BC Lions	W 34–20	8–5		
14	14	Oct 11	at Saskatchewan Roughriders	W 44–6	9–5		
15	15	Oct 18	at Winnipeg Blue Bombers	L 15–24	9–6		
16	16	Oct 25	vs. Ottawa Rough Riders	L 9–31	9–7		
17	17	Nov 1	vs. Calgary Stampeders	W 32–17	10–7		
18	18	Nov 8	at Toronto Argonauts	W 48–35	11–7		

== Postseason ==
Round	Date	Opponent	Results		Venue	Attendance
Round	Date	Opponent	Score	Record	Venue	Attendance
East Semi-Final	Nov 15	vs. Ottawa Rough Riders	29–28	1–0		
East Final	Nov 22	at Winnipeg Blue Bombers	L 11–59	1–1		

== Roster ==
1992 Hamilton Tiger-Cats final roster
Quarterbacks: 9 Damon Allen; 19 Todd Dillon; 16 Don McPherson; Running backs: 33 Paul Bushey; 12 Dave Dinnall; 38 John Hood; 25 Lee Knight; 22 Orville Lee; 34 Ernie Schramayr; Receivers: 17 Ken Evraire; 5 Joey Jauch; 82 David Lucas; 88 Lonzell Hill; 80 Nick Mazzoli; 85 Richard Nurse; 18 Scott Walker; 1 Earl Winfield; 21 Wally Zatylny	Offensive linemen: 68 Scott Douglas G; 63 Darrell Harle G; 67 Mike Jovanovich T; 61 Paul Maines T; 62 Dan Payne T; 51 David Richardson T; 56 Jason Riley G; 56 Dale Sanderson C; Defensive linemen: 93 Romel Andrews DE; 94 David Bailey DE; 92 Steve Bates DE; 95 Jeff Fields DT; 72 Mark Mraz DT; 91 Brett Williams DE; 98 Lubo Zizakovic DT	Linebackers: 50 David Arnold; 49 Mark Dennis; 90 Pete Giftopoulos; 42 John Motton; 30 Lance Trumble; 35 John Zajdel; Defensive backs: 27 Bobby Dawson; 4 Corris Ervin; 15 Roger Hennig; 40 Tim Jackson; 2 Jim Jauch; 24 Derrick Kelson; 26 Rickey Royal; 20 Gary Wilkerson; 6 Todd Wiseman; 7 Terry Wright; Special teams: 3 Paul Osbaldiston K/P; Italics indicate American players
