= 1992 Calgary Stampeders season =

Canadian football team season

- Owner: Larry Ryckman
- General manager: Wally Buono
- Head coach: Wally Buono
- Home stadium: McMahon Stadium

Results
- Record: 13–5
- Division place: 1st, West
- Playoffs: Won Grey Cup

The 1992 Calgary Stampeders finished in first place in the West Division with a 13–5 record and won the Grey Cup for the first time since 1971, ending the longest drought of any team at that time.

On September 20, Calgary began the CFL's longest ever regular season home winning and unbeaten streaks. These streaks ended on August 18, 1995 at 27.

== Offseason ==
=== CFL draft ===
Rd	Pick	Player	Position	School
1	1	Bruce Covernton	T	Weber State
1	7	Tyrone Williams	WR	Western Ontario
3	23	Bobby Pandelidis	T/G	Eastern Michigan
4	27	Frank Marot	RB/SB	Guelph
4	31	Jean Stiverne	DB	Miami (Fla.)
5	39	Sandy Annunziata	DT	Western Ontario
6	47	Greg Knox	DB	Wilfrid Laurier
6	48	Tim Bisci	DB	Wilfrid Laurier
7	55	Craig Kittelson	TB	Calgary
8	63	James Buchanan	WR	Calgary

== Preseason ==
Game	Date	Opponent	Results		Venue	Attendance
Game	Date	Opponent	Score	Record	Venue	Attendance
A	Sun, June 21	at Hamilton Tiger-Cats	L 18–20	0–1	Ivor Wynne Stadium	9,073
B	Thurs, June 25	vs. Toronto Argonauts*	W 20–1	1–1	Civic Stadium	15,362
C	Tue, June 30	vs. Toronto Argonauts	W 36–28	1–1	McMahon Stadium	20,194

- June 25 game against Toronto was played at Civic Stadium in Portland, Oregon.

== Regular season ==
=== Season standings ===
West Division
Pos	Team	Pld	W	L	T	PF	PA	PD	Pts	Div	Stk
1	Calgary Stampeders (C, Q)	18	13	5	0	607	430	177	26	8–2	W1
2	Edmonton Eskimos (Q)	18	10	8	0	552	515	37	20	5–5	W1
3	Saskatchewan Roughriders (Q)	18	9	9	0	505	545	−40	18	6–4	L1
4	BC Lions	18	3	15	0	472	667	−195	6	1–9	L7

Source: "CFL.ca - Official Site of the Canadian Football League". Archived from the original on 2011-08-10.
(C) First round bye; (Q) Qualified for playoffs

=== Season schedule ===
Game	Date	Opponent	Results		Venue	Attendance
Game	Date	Opponent	Score	Record	Venue	Attendance
1	Wed, July 8	at Saskatchewan Roughriders	W 44–26	1–0	Taylor Field	20,416
2	Thurs, July 16	vs. Hamilton Tiger-Cats	W 34–22	2–0	McMahon Stadium	25,144
3	Thurs, July 23	at BC Lions	W 37–19	3–0	BC Place	31,053
4	Thurs, July 30	vs. Toronto Argonauts	W 28–26	4–0	McMahon Stadium	31,504
5	Fri, Aug 7	at Saskatchewan Roughriders	L 21–30	4–1	Taylor Field	21,100
6	Thurs, Aug 13	at Ottawa Rough Riders	L 11–32	4–2	Lansdowne Park	24,752
7	Fri, Aug 21	vs. BC Lions	W 44–23	5–2	McMahon Stadium	21,508
8	Fri, Aug 28	at Edmonton Eskimos	W 45–38 (OT)	6–2	Commonwealth Stadium	31,812
9	Mon, Sept 7	vs. Edmonton Eskimos	L 21–34	6–3	McMahon Stadium	38,205
10	Sun, Sept 13	at Toronto Argonauts	W 31–0	7–3	SkyDome	29,044
11	Sun, Sept 20	vs. Winnipeg Blue Bombers	W 57–29	8–3	McMahon Stadium	22,320
12	Sun, Sept 27	at Winnipeg Blue Bombers	L 16–17	8–4	Winnipeg Stadium	24,964
13	Sun, Oct 4	vs. Ottawa Rough Riders	W 47–11	9–4	McMahon Stadium	20,207
14	Sat, Oct 10	at BC Lions	W 40–21	10–4	BC Place	26,618
15	Sun, Oct 18	vs. Saskatchewan Roughriders	W 34–30	11–4	McMahon Stadium	24,451
16	Sat, Oct 24	vs. Edmonton Eskimos	W 40–23	12–4	McMahon Stadium	22,884
17	Sun, Nov 1	at Hamilton Tiger-Cats	L 17–32	12–5	Ivor Wynne Stadium	12,227
18	Sun, Nov 8	vs. Saskatchewan Roughriders	W 40–17	13–5	McMahon Stadium	22,740

== 1992 CFL All-Stars ==
=== Offence ===
- QB – Doug Flutie
- SB – Allen Pitts
- OG – Rocco Romano

=== Defence ===
- DT – Will Johnson
- CB – Junior Thurman
- DB – Darryl Hall

== 1992 Western All-Stars ==
=== Offence ===
- QB – Doug Flutie
- SB – Allen Pitts
- OG – Rocco Romano

=== Defence ===
- DE – Will Johnson
- LB – Alondra Johnson
- LB – Matt Finlay
- CB – Junior Thurman
- DB – Darryl Hall

=== Special teams ===
- K – Mark McLoughlin

== 1992 CFL awards ==
- CFL's Most Outstanding Player Award – Doug Flutie (QB)
- CFL's Coach of the Year – Wally Buono

== Playoffs ==
=== West Final ===
Team	Q1	Q2	Q3	Q4	Total
Edmonton Eskimos	1	7	7	7	22
Calgary Stampeders	0	13	0	10	23

=== Grey Cup ===
Team	Q1	Q2	Q3	Q4	Total
Calgary Stampeders	11	6	0	7	24
Winnipeg Blue Bombers	0	0	0	10	10

== Roster ==
1992 Calgary Stampeders final roster
Quarterbacks: 20 Doug Flutie; 9 Steve Taylor; 16 Bob Torrance; Running backs: 31 Duane Forde; 23 Keyvan Jenkins; 34 Andy McVey; 21 Eric Mitchel; 36 Blair Zerr; Receivers: 85 Carl Bland; 83 Derrick Crawford; 79 Frank Marof; 82 Will Moore; 18 Allen Pitts; 25 Dave Sapunjis; 86 Demetrius Smith	Offensive linemen: 58 Lou Cafazzo G; 60 Bruce Covernton T; 56 Doug Davies G/C; 54 Bob MacDonald C; 64 Ken Moore T; 59 Rocco Romano G; 69 Todd Storme T; Defensive linemen: 90 Tim Cofield DE; 95 Harald Hasselbach DT; 81 Will Johnson DE; 75 Stu Laird DT; 96 Srecko Zizakovic DE/DT; Special teams: 11 Tony Martino P; 13 Mark McLoughlin K	Linebackers: 4 Doug Brewster; 29 Paul Clatney; 39 Mark Dube; 37 Matt Finlay; 51 Alondra Johnson; 91 Marvin Pope; 44 Mark Singer; Defensive backs: 19 Karl Anthony; 7 Darryl Hall; 8 Greg Knox; 30 Kenton Leonard; 24 Greg Peterson; 14 Aaron Ruffin; 2 Junior Thurman; 3 Erroll Tucker; 33 Ken Watson; Italics indicate International player
