= 1992 Saskatchewan Roughriders season =

CFL team season

- General manager: Alan Ford
- Head coach: Don Matthews
- Home stadium: Taylor Field

Results
- Record: 9–9
- Division place: 3rd, West
- Playoffs: Lost West Semi-Final

Uniform

The 1992 Saskatchewan Roughriders season was the 78th season in the club's 82nd year of existence. The team finished in third place in the Canadian Football League's West Division with an 9–9 record. The Roughriders qualified for the playoffs, but lost the West Semi-Final game to the Edmonton Eskimos.

This season, the Roughriders set team records for passing yards in one season (6346), and pass completions in one season (465). Both of these ranked second all-time in CFL history for a single season.

== Offseason ==
=== CFL draft ===
Round	Pick	Player	Position	School
1	2	Matthiew Scott	LB	Virginia Tech
2	10	Ray Bernard	LB	Bishop's
2	15	Scott Hendrickson	WR	Minnesota
5	34	Klaus Wilmsmeyer	K/P	Louisville
6	42	Tom MacCullum	OL	Minot State
7	50	Peter Miller	LB	Pacific
8	58	Mike Vanderjagt	WR/P	West Virginia

== Preseason ==
Game	Date	Opponent	Results		Venue	Attendance
Game	Date	Opponent	Score	Record	Venue	Attendance
A	Bye					
B	Fri, June 26	vs. Winnipeg Blue Bombers	L 11–33	0–1	Taylor Field	21,161
C	Thu, July 2	at Edmonton Eskimos	W 26–15	1–1	Commonwealth Stadium	32,186

== Regular season ==
=== Season standings ===
West Division
Pos	Team	Pld	W	L	T	PF	PA	PD	Pts	Div	Stk
1	Calgary Stampeders (C, Q)	18	13	5	0	607	430	177	26	8–2	W1
2	Edmonton Eskimos (Q)	18	10	8	0	552	515	37	20	5–5	W1
3	Saskatchewan Roughriders (Q)	18	9	9	0	505	545	−40	18	6–4	L1
4	BC Lions	18	3	15	0	472	667	−195	6	1–9	L7

Source: "CFL.ca - Official Site of the Canadian Football League". Archived from the original on 2011-08-10.
(C) First round bye; (Q) Qualified for playoffs

=== Season schedule ===
Week	Game	Date	Opponent	Results		Venue	Attendance
Week	Game	Date	Opponent	Score	Record	Venue	Attendance
1	1	Wed, July 8	vs. Calgary Stampeders	L 26–44	0–1	Taylor Field	20,416
2	2	Wed, July 15	at Edmonton Eskimos	31–34 (OT)	0–2	Commonwealth Stadium	26,764
3	3	Fri, July 24	vs. Ottawa Rough Riders	W 23–13	1–2	Taylor Field	20,117
4	4	Thu, July 30	at Hamilton Tiger-Cats	L 24–38	1–3	Ivor Wynne Stadium	21,023
5	5	Fri, Aug 7	vs. Calgary Stampeders	W 30–21	2–3	Taylor Field	21,100
6	6	Thu, Aug 13	at BC Lions	W 46–43 (OT)	3–3	BC Place	25,653
7	7	Thu, Aug 20	at Ottawa Rough Riders	L 9–20	3–4	Lansdowne Park	24,020
8	8	Sat, Aug 29	vs. BC Lions	W 47–36	4–4	Taylor Field	19,345
9	9	Sun, Sept 6	vs. Winnipeg Blue Bombers	W 32–20	5–4	Taylor Field	29,298
10	10	Sun, Sept 13	at Winnipeg Blue Bombers	L 16–37	5–5	Winnipeg Stadium	26,242
11	11	Sun, Sept 20	vs. Edmonton Eskimos	W 22–18	6–5	Taylor Field	22,256
12	12	Sat, Sept 26	at Toronto Argonauts	L 32–39	6–6	SkyDome	26,132
13	13	Sun, Oct 4	vs. Toronto Argonauts	W 43–18	7–6	Taylor Field	22,991
14	14	Sun, Oct 11	vs. Hamilton Tiger-Cats	L 6–44	7–7	Taylor Field	20,025
15	15	Sun, Oct 18	at Calgary Stampeders	L 30–34	7–8	McMahon Stadium	24,451
16	16	Sun, Oct 25	vs. BC Lions	W 41–22	8–8	Taylor Field	19,788
17	17	Sun, Nov 1	at Edmonton Eskimos	W 30–24	9–8	Commonwealth Stadium	26,329
18	18	Sun, Nov 8	at Calgary Stampeders	L 17–40	9–9	McMahon Stadium	22,740

== Postseason ==
=== Schedule ===
Round	Date	Opponent	Results		Venue	Attendance
Round	Date	Opponent	Score	Record	Venue	Attendance
West Semi-Final	Sun, Nov 15	at Edmonton Eskimos	L 20–22	0–1	Commonwealth Stadium	25,565

== Roster ==
1992 Saskatchewan Roughriders final roster
Quarterbacks: 5 Kent Austin; 6 Warren Jones; 9 Fred McNair; Running backs: 31 Lucius Floyd; 32 Milson Jones; 26 David Pitcher; 33 Mike Saunders; Receivers: 15 Bruce Boyko; 81 Ray Elgaard; 18 Jeff Fairholm; 10 Dan Farthing; 80 Don Narcisse; 82 Byron Williams	Offensive linemen: 44 Roger Aldag G; 66 Mike Anderson C; 58 Chris Gioskos G/T; 59 Craig Hendrickson T; 63 Scott Hendrickson C; 57 Bob Poley G/T; 62 Vic Stevenson T; 61 Paul Vajda G; Defensive linemen: 97 Robert Banks DE; 98 Jearld Baylis DT; 92 Lance Cook DE; 77 Wayne Drinkwalter DT/DE; 71 Bobby Jurasin DE; 79 Gary Lewis DT	Linebackers: 38 Ray Bernard; 91 Danny Grayson; 35 Tyrone Jones; 74 Dan Rashovich; 47 Kelly Trithart; Defensive backs: 8 Charles Anthony; 4 Albert Brown; 24 Ventson Donelson; 2 Stacey Hairston; 19 John Hoffman; 29 Kim McCloud; 27 Glen Suitor; Special teams: 13 Brent Matich P; 36 Dave Ridgway K; Italics indicate American player

== Awards and records ==
- CFL's Most Outstanding Canadian Award – Ray Elgaard (SB), Saskatchewan Roughriders
- Commissioner's Award - Tom Shepherd, Saskatchewan Roughriders

=== 1992 CFL All-Stars ===
- SB – Ray Elgaard
- OT – Vic Stevenson
- DT – Jearld Baylis
- DE – Bobby Jurasin
- DS – Glen Suitor

=== 1992 Western All-Stars ===
- SB – Ray Elgaard
- OT – Vic Stevenson
- DT – Jearld Baylis
- DE – Bobby Jurasin
- DS – Glen Suitor
