= Chronopoulos =

Chronopoulos is a surname. Notable people with the surname include:

- Denny Chronopoulos (1968–2000), Canadian football player
- Ted Chronopoulos (born 1972), American soccer player
