= Bill Hitchcock =

Canadian gridiron football player (born 1965)

No. 76
- Positions: Guard, tackle

Personal information
- Born: August 26, 1965 (age 61); Kirkland Lake, Ontario, Canada
- Listed height: 6 ft 6 in (1.98 m)
- Listed weight: 296 lb (134 kg)

Career information
- High school: Pointe-Claire (QC) Lindsay Place
- College: Purdue
- NFL draft: 1990: 8th round, 202nd overall pick
- CFL draft: 1990: 3rd round, 24th overall pick

Career history
- Seattle Seahawks (1990–1994)

Career NFL statistics
- Games played: 51
- Games started: 39
- Fumble recoveries: 2
- Stats at Pro Football Reference

William Frederick Hitchcock (born August 26, 1965) is a Canadian former professional football player who was an offensive lineman for four seasons with the Seattle Seahawks of the National Football League (NFL). He was selected in the eighth round of the 1990 NFL draft with the 202nd overall pick by the Seahawks.
