= 1992 BC Lions season =

Canadian football team season

- Owner: Bill Comrie
- General manager: Bob O'Billovich
- Head coach: Bob O'Billovich
- Home stadium: BC Place Stadium

Results
- Record: 3–15
- Division place: 4th, West
- Playoffs: did not qualify

Uniform

The 1992 BC Lions finished in fourth place in the West Division with a 3–15 record and failed to make to playoffs.

== Offseason ==
=== CFL draft ===
Round	Pick	Player	Position	School
1	4	Lorne King	RB	Toronto
1	5	Todd Furdyk	OL	Rocky
2	13	Doug Peterson	OL	Simon Fraser
4	29	Jamie Crysdale	C	Cincinnati
5	37	Alex Ikonikov	LB	Tiffin
6	45	Steve Thompson	RB	Rocky
7	53	Mike Rend	DB	Simon Fraser
8	61	Rod Farquharson	WR	Simon Fraser

== Preseason ==
Game	Date	Opponent	Results		Venue	Attendance
Game	Date	Opponent	Score	Record	Venue	Attendance
A	Thu, June 25	at Ottawa Rough Riders	L 36–43	0–1	Lansdowne Park	14,276
B	Thu, July 2	vs. Hamilton Tiger-Cats	L 24–31	0–2	BC Place	20,183

== Regular season ==
=== Season standings ===
West Division
Pos	Team	Pld	W	L	T	PF	PA	PD	Pts	Div	Stk
1	Calgary Stampeders (C, Q)	18	13	5	0	607	430	177	26	8–2	W1
2	Edmonton Eskimos (Q)	18	10	8	0	552	515	37	20	5–5	W1
3	Saskatchewan Roughriders (Q)	18	9	9	0	505	545	−40	18	6–4	L1
4	BC Lions	18	3	15	0	472	667	−195	6	1–9	L7

Source: "CFL.ca - Official Site of the Canadian Football League". Archived from the original on 2011-08-10.
(C) First round bye; (Q) Qualified for playoffs

=== Season schedule ===
Week	Game	Date	Opponent	Results		Venue	Attendance
Week	Game	Date	Opponent	Score	Record	Venue	Attendance
1	1	Thu, July 9	vs. Edmonton Eskimos	L 26–37	0–1	BC Place	23,917
2	2	Thu, July 16	at Toronto Argonauts	L 20–61	0–2	SkyDome	36,682
3	3	Thu, July 23	vs. Calgary Stampeders	L 19–37	0–3	BC Place	31,053
4	4	Thu, July 30	at Winnipeg Blue Bombers	L 15–41	0–4	Winnipeg Stadium	23,293
5	5	Thu, Aug 6	vs. Hamilton Tiger-Cats	25–27	0–5	BC Place	24,606
6	6	Thu, Aug 13	vs. Saskatchewan Roughriders	L 43–46 (OT)	0–6	BC Place	25,653
7	7	Fri, Aug 21	at Calgary Stampeders	L 23–44	0–7	McMahon Stadium	21,508
8	8	Sat, Aug 29	at Saskatchewan Roughriders	L 36–47	0–8	Taylor Field	19,345
9	9	Thu, Sept 3	vs. Ottawa Rough Riders	W 33–27	1–8	BC Place	20,997
10	10	Fri, Sept 11	at Edmonton Eskimos	W 34–20	2–8	Commonwealth Stadium	48,793
11	11	Sat, Sept 19	vs. Toronto Argonauts	W 36–29	3–8	BC Place	34,646
12	12	Sun, Sept 27	at Ottawa Rough Riders	L 23–27	3–9	Lansdowne Park	24,938
13	13	Sat, Oct 3	at Hamilton Tiger-Cats	L 20–34	3–10	Ivor Wynne Stadium	13,628
14	14	Sat, Oct 10	vs. Calgary Stampeders	L 21–40	3–11	BC Place	26,618
15	15	Fri, Oct 16	at Edmonton Eskimos	L 17–43	3–12	Commonwealth Stadium	21,164
16	16	Sun, Oct 25	at Saskatchewan Roughriders	L 22–41	3–13	Taylor Field	19,788
17	17	Sat, Oct 31	vs. Winnipeg Blue Bombers	L 26–29	3–14	BC Place	18,183
18	18	Sat, Nov 7	vs. Edmonton Eskimos	L 33–37	3–15	BC Place	22,200

== Roster ==
1992 BC Lions final roster
Quarterbacks: 9 Danny Barrett; 2 Giulio Caravatta K/P; 10 Mike Johnson; 11 Tony Kimbrough; Running backs: 34 Ryan Hanson; 26 Lorne King; 33 Mike Marasco; 25 Sean Millington; 28 Robert Mimbs; 23 Jon Volpe; Receivers: 88 Ray Alexander; 85 Matt Clark; 82 Darren Flutie; 83 Will Hinchcliff; 80 Willis Jacox; 16 Spencer McLennan; 76 Kevin Thompson; 77 Mike Trevathan	Offensive linemen: 59 Carl Coulter C/G; 53 Leo Groenewegen G; 63 Bill Henry G; 66 Jim Mills T; 50 Steve Rodehutskors T; 55 Ian Sinclair C; 60 Jamie Taras G; Defensive linemen: 36 Stewart Hill DE; 60 Lee Johnson DT; 98 Tim Lorenz DT/DE; 95 John MacNeill DT/DE; 91 Keith Powe DT; 72 Glen Scrivener DT/DE; Special teams: 7 Wayne Lammle K; 5 Lui Passaglia K/P	Linebackers: 44 Zock Allen; 57 O. J. Brigance; 39 Matt Clarke; 90 Doug Hocking; 31 Mark Scott; 35 Paul Wetmore; 27 Donovan Wright; Defensive backs: 1 Andre Francis; 14 Ron Francis; 3 Tracy Gravely; 18 Joe Mero; 19 Remi Trudel; 24 Brett Young; Injured list: 79 Derek MacCready DT; Italics indicate International player

== Awards and records ==
- CFLPA's Most Outstanding Community Service Award – Danny Barrett (QB)

=== 1992 CFL All-Stars ===
None

=== Western All-Star selections ===
- Jon Volpe (RB), Western All-Star
- Jim Mills (OT), Western All-Star
- Darren Flutie (WR), Western All-Star
- Lui Passaglia (K), Western All-Star
