= 1992 Edmonton Eskimos season =

Canadian football team season

- General manager: Hugh Campbell
- Head coach: Ron Lancaster
- Home stadium: Commonwealth Stadium

Results
- Record: 10-8
- Division place: 2nd, West
- Playoffs: Lost West Final

The 1992 Edmonton Eskimos finished in second place in the West Division with a 10–8 record. The club attempted to win their 11th Grey Cup championship, but lost the West Final to the eventual Grey Cup champion Calgary Stampeders.

== Offseason ==
=== CFL draft ===
#	Player	Pos	College
6	Sean Fleming	K/P	Wyoming
8	Chris Morris	OL	Toronto
14	Erroll Martin	K/P	Utah
18	Simon Taylor	T	Concordia
26	Terris Chorney	C	Nebraska

=== Schedule ===
# Date Visitor Score Home OT Attendance A June 25 Calgary Stampeders 22–8 Edmonton Eskimos 36,553 B June 30 Edmonton Eskimos 27–20 BC Lions

== Regular season ==
=== Season standings ===
West Division
Pos	Team	Pld	W	L	T	PF	PA	PD	Pts	Div	Stk
1	Calgary Stampeders (C, Q)	18	13	5	0	607	430	177	26	8–2	W1
2	Edmonton Eskimos (Q)	18	10	8	0	552	515	37	20	5–5	W1
3	Saskatchewan Roughriders (Q)	18	9	9	0	505	545	−40	18	6–4	L1
4	BC Lions	18	3	15	0	472	667	−195	6	1–9	L7

Source: "CFL.ca - Official Site of the Canadian Football League". Archived from the original on 2011-08-10.
(C) First round bye; (Q) Qualified for playoffs

=== Season schedule ===
Week	Game	Date	Opponent	Results		Venue	Attendance
Week	Game	Date	Opponent	Score	Record	Venue	Attendance
1	1	July 9	at BC Lions	W 37–26	1–0	BC Place	23,917
2	2	July 15	vs. Saskatchewan Roughriders	W 34–31 (OT)	2-0	Commonwealth Stadium	26,764
3	3	July 22	at Winnipeg Blue Bombers	L 32–51	2–1	Winnipeg Stadium	24,265
4	4	July 30	at Ottawa Rough Riders	W 30–25	3–1	Lansdowne Park	25,625
5	5	Aug 6	vs. Ottawa Rough Riders	W 29–14	4-1	Commonwealth Stadium	25,113
6	6	Aug 12	at Hamilton Tiger-Cats	W 30–28	5-1	Ivor Wynne Stadium	21,327
7	7	Aug 20	vs. Toronto Argonauts	W 39–16	6-1	Commonwealth Stadium	30,186
8	8	Aug 28	vs. Calgary Stampeders	L 38–45 (OT)	6-2	Commonwealth Stadium	31,812
9	9	Sept 7	at Calgary Stampeders	W 34–21	7-2	McMahon Stadium	38,205
10	10	Sept 11	vs. BC Lions	L 20–34	7-3	Commonwealth Stadium	48,793
11	11	Sept 20	at Saskatchewan Roughriders	L 18–22	7–4	Taylor Field	22,256
12	12	Sept 25	vs. Hamilton Tiger-Cats	L 25–26	7–5	Commonwealth Stadium	21,537
13	13	Oct 2	vs. Winnipeg Blue Bombers	W 45–25	8-5	Commonwealth Stadium	26,680
14	14	Oct 10	at Toronto Argonauts	L 14–31	8–6	SkyDome	33,189
15	15	Oct 16	vs. BC Lions	W 43–17	9–6	Commonwealth Stadium	21,164
16	16	Oct 24	at Calgary Stampeders	L 23–40	9-7	McMahon Stadium	22,884
17	17	Nov 1	vs. Saskatchewan Roughriders	L 24–30	9-8	Commonwealth Stadium	26,329
18	18	Nov 7	at BC Lions	W 37-33	10-8	BC Place	22,200

Total attendance: 258,378
Average attendance: 28,709 (47.8%)

== Playoffs ==
Round	Date	Opponent	Results		Venue	Attendance
Round	Date	Opponent	Score	Record	Venue	Attendance
Division Semi-Final	Nov 15	vs. Saskatchewan Roughriders	W 22-20	1–0	Commonwealth Stadium	25,565
Division Final	Nov 22	at Calgary Stampeders	L 22-23	2–0	McMahon Stadium	28,100

== Roster ==
1992 Edmonton Eskimos final roster
Quarterbacks: 6 DeChane Cameron; 8 Tracy Ham; 15 Tom Muecke; Running backs: 36 Robert Hardy; 83 Chris Johnstone; 22 Blake Marshall; 32 Michael Soles; 34 Brian Walling; Receivers: 87 Jay Christensen; 88 Darrell Colbert; 72 Kasey Dunn; 33 Craig Ellis; 7 Jim Sandusky; 2 Gizmo Williams; 26 Ken Winey	Offensive linemen: 57 Randy Ambrosie G; 67 Rod Connop C; 50 Blake Dermott T; 53 Mike Dumaresq G; 56 Steve Krupey G; 60 Chris Morris T; 54 Pierre Vercheval G; Defensive linemen: 94 Michel Bourgeau NT; 96 Rob Davidson NT; 40 Bennie Goods DE; 75 Loyd Lewis DE/NT; 43 Jed Roberts DE; Special teams: 3 Sean Fleming K; 18 Glenn Harper P	Linebackers: 89 Leroy Blugh; 37 John Davis; 45 Mike McLean; 36 DeWayne Odom; 39 Willie Pless; 47 Larry Wruck; Defensive backs: 28 Trent Brown; 29 Enis Jackson; 11 Stephen Jordan; 10 Damion Lyons; 24 Danny Murphy; 23 Travis Oliver; 14 Doug Parrish; 25 Nuygen Pendleton; 17 Eddie Lee Thomas; Italics indicate American player
