= 1992 Ottawa Rough Riders season =

Canadian football team season

- Head coach: Ron Smeltzer
- Home stadium: Frank Clair Stadium

Results
- Record: 9–9
- Division place: 3rd, East
- Playoffs: Lost East Semi-Final

Uniform

The 1992 Ottawa Rough Riders finished third place in the East Division with a 9–9 record. They were defeated in the East Semi-Final by the Hamilton Tiger-Cats.

== Offseason ==
=== CFL draft ===
Rd	Pick	Player	Position	School
1	3	Denny Chronopoulos	OG	Purdue
2	11	Ken Walcott	OG	Saint Mary's
2	16	Joe Sardo	OL	Hawaii
3	19	Dave Chaytors	DL	Utah
5	35	Rob Trebllcock	WR	Weber State
6	43	Mike Boone	LB	Queen's
7	51	Mike Doucette	CB	Ottawa
8	59	Ian Ployart	DB	Concordia

=== Preseason ===
Date	Opponent	Result	Record	Venue	Attendance
June 25	vs. BC Lions	W 43–36	1–0		14,276
July 2	at Winnipeg Blue Bombers	W 21–19	2–0		33,359

== Regular season ==
=== Season standings ===
East Division
Pos	Team	Pld	W	L	T	PF	PA	PD	Pts	Div	Stk
1	Winnipeg Blue Bombers (C, Q)	18	11	7	0	507	499	8	22	7–3	W5
2	Hamilton Tiger-Cats (Q)	18	11	7	0	536	514	22	22	5–5	W2
3	Ottawa Rough Riders (Q)	18	9	9	0	484	439	45	18	6–4	L1
4	Toronto Argonauts	18	6	12	0	469	523	−54	12	3–7	L3

Source: "CFL.ca - Official Site of the Canadian Football League". Archived from the original on 2011-08-10.
(C) First round bye; (Q) Qualified for playoffs

=== Schedule ===
Week	Date	Opponent	Result	Record	Venue	Attendance
1	July 9	vs. Toronto Argonauts	W 53–42 (OT)	1–0		23,222
2	July 16	vs. Winnipeg Blue Bombers	W 29–14	2–0		23,594
3	July 24	at Saskatchewan Roughriders	L 13–23	2–1		20,117
4	July 30	vs. Edmonton Eskimos	L 25–30	2–2		25,625
5	Aug 6	at Edmonton Eskimos	L 14–29	2–3		25,113
6	Aug 13	vs. Calgary Stampeders	W 32–11	3–3		24,752
7	Aug 20	vs. Saskatchewan Roughriders	W 20–9	4–3		24,020
8	Aug 26	at Toronto Argonauts	L 16–24	4–4		44,922
9	Sept 3	at BC Lions	L 27–33	4–5		20,997
10	Sept 13	vs. Hamilton Tiger-Cats	W 44–31	5–5		24,364
11	Sept 19	at Hamilton Tiger-Cats	W 54–25	6–5		17,682
12	Sept 27	vs. BC Lions	W 27–23	7–5		24,938
13	Oct 4	at Calgary Stampeders	L 11–47	7–6		20,207
14	Oct 12	vs. Winnipeg Blue Bombers	L 47–49	7–7		23,898
15	Oct 18	at Toronto Argonauts	L 4–10	7–8		26,337
16	Oct 25	at Hamilton Tiger-Cats	W 31–9	8–8		16,742
17	Oct 31	vs. Toronto Argonauts	W 31–12	9–8		24,694
18	Nov 8	at Winnipeg Blue Bombers	L 6–18	9–9		27,589

== Postseason ==
Round	Date	Opponent	Result	Record	Venue	Attendance
East Semi-Final	Nov 15	at Hamilton Tiger-Cats	L 28–29	0–1		21,412

== Roster ==
1992 Ottawa Rough Riders final roster
Quarterbacks: 13 Tom Burgess; 14 Scott Campbell; 6 Terrence Jones; Running backs: 19 Reggie Barnes; 25 David Conrad; 34 Shawn Daniels; 20 Darren Joseph; Receivers: 81 Jock Climie; 85 James Ellingson; 86 Bob Gordon; 89 Stephen Jones; 80 Treamelle Taylor; 84 Wayne Walker	Offensive linemen: 53 Denny Chronopoulos T/G; 52 John Coflin G; 54 Irv Daymond C; 56 Michel Lamy G; 58 Rob Smith T; 55 Brad Tierney G; 69 Kari Yli-Renko T; Defensive linemen: 73 John Kropke NT; 68 Glenn Kulka DE; 92 Dexter Manley DE; 74 Rob Prodanovic DE; 63 Michel Raby NT; 98 Lybrant Robinson DE; Special teams: 10 Terry Baker K/P	Linebackers: 48 Daved Benefield; 90 Brian Bonner; 36 Joe Sardo; 91 Angelo Snipes; 45 Greg Stumon; 35 Pat Wayne; 43 Gord Weber; Defensive backs: 33 Michael Allen; 15 Less Browne; 7 Anthony Drawhorn; 22 Sean Foudy; 24 Ken Hailey; 26 Charles Gordon; 27 Daniel Hunter; 29 Ken Walcott; 39 Charlie Wright; Italics indicate International player

== Awards and honours ==
- CFL's Most Outstanding Offensive Lineman Award – Robert Smith (OG)

=== 1992 CFL All-Stars ===
- WR – Stephen Jones, CFL All-Star
- OT – Robert Smith, CFL All-Star
- LB – Angelo Snipes, CFL All-Star
- CB – Less Browne, CFL All-Star
- DB – Anthony Drawhorn, CFL All-Star
