= Lefty Hendrickson =

Canadian gridiron football player (born 1943)

Profile
- Position: Tight end

Personal information
- Born: April 27, 1943 (age 83); Squamish, British Columbia, Canada
- Listed height: 6 ft 1 in (1.85 m)
- Listed weight: 215 lb (98 kg)

Career information
- College: Oregon

Career history
- 1968–1974: BC Lions

Awards and highlights
- CFL West All-Star (1973)

Lynn "Lefty" Hendrickson (born April 27, 1943) is a Canadian football player who played professionally for the BC Lions. His sons Scott Hendrickson and Craig Hendrickson both played in the CFL as well.
