= 1992 CFL draft =

Canadian football draft

The 1992 CFL draft composed of eight rounds where 64 Canadian football players were chosen from eligible Canadian universities and Canadian players playing in the NCAA.

== 1st round ==
= CFL Division All-Star	= CFL All-Star	= Hall of Famer

Pick #	CFL team	Player	Position	School
1	Calgary Stampeders	Bruce Covernton	T	Weber State
2	Saskatchewan Roughriders	Matthiew Scott	LB	Virginia Tech
3	Ottawa Rough Riders	Denny Chronopoulos	G	Purdue
4	BC Lions	Lorne King	HB	Toronto
5	BC Lions	Todd Furdyk	OL	Rocky Mountain
6	Edmonton Eskimos	Sean Fleming	K/P	Wyoming
7	Calgary Stampeders	Tyrone Williams	WR	Western Ontario
8	Edmonton Eskimos	Chris Morris	OL	Toronto

== 2nd round ==
= CFL Division All-Star	= CFL All-Star	= Hall of Famer

Pick #	CFL team	Player	Position	School
9	Hamilton Tiger-Cats	Joey Jauch	T	North Carolina
10	Saskatchewan Roughriders	Ray Bernard	LB	Bishop's
11	Ottawa Rough Riders	Ken Walcott	G	Saint Mary's
12	Winnipeg Blue Bombers	Chris Tsangaris	HB	Long Beach State
13	BC Lions	Doug Peterson	OL	Simon Fraser
14	Edmonton Eskimos	Erroll Martin	LB	Utah
15	Saskatchewan Roughriders	Scott Hendrickson	OL	Minnesota
16	Ottawa Rough Riders	Joe Sardo	LB	Hawaii-Manoa

== 3rd round ==
= CFL Division All-Star	= CFL All-Star	= Hall of Famer

Pick #	CFL team	Player	Position	School
17	Hamilton Tiger-Cats	Frank Santorelli	LB	Simon Fraser
18	Edmonton Eskimos	Simon Taylor	T	Concordia
19	Ottawa Rough Riders	Dave Chaytors	DL	Utah
20	Winnipeg Blue Bombers	Konrad Pimiskern	OL	Washington State
21	Winnipeg Blue Bombers	Tom Stackaruk	OL	Weber State
22	Hamilton Tiger-Cats	Glen Young	LB	Syracuse
23	Calgary Stampeders	Bobby Pandelidis	T/G	Eastern Michigan
24	Toronto Argonauts	Marc Dube	LB	Maine

== 4th round ==
= CFL Division All-Star	= CFL All-Star	= Hall of Famer

Pick #	CFL team	Player	Position	School
25	Hamilton Tiger-Cats	Rawle Bynoe	DB	Louisville
26	Edmonton Eskimos	Terris Chorney	C	Nebraska
27	Calgary Stampeders	Frank Marot	RB/SB	Guelph
28	Winnipeg Blue Bombers	Andrew Martin	WR	Cornell
29	BC Lions	Jamie Crysdale	C	Cincinnati
30	Edmonton Eskimos	Mohammed Elsaghir	WR	Calgary
31	Calgary Stampeders	Jean Stiverne	DB	Miami (Fla.)
32	Toronto Argonauts	Chris Hughes	DL	Hayward

== 5th round ==
= CFL Division All-Star	= CFL All-Star	= Hall of Famer

Pick #	CFL team	Player	Position	School
33	Hamilton Tiger-Cats	Jim Gianakopolous	DE	Colgate
34	Saskatchewan Roughriders	Klaus Wilmsmeyer	K/P	Louisville
35	Ottawa Rough Riders	Rob Treblicock	WR	Weber State
36	Winnipeg Blue Bombers	Ousmane Bary	DB	Syracuse
37	BC Lions	Alex Ikonikov	LB	Tiffin
38	Edmonton Eskimos	Darren Boyer	HB	Illinois
39	Calgary Stampeders	Sandy Annunziata	DT	Western Ontario
40	Toronto Argonauts	Chris Wilson	LB	Bishop's

== 6th round ==
= CFL Division All-Star	= CFL All-Star	= Hall of Famer

Pick #	CFL team	Player	Position	School
41	Hamilton Tiger-Cats	Brian Johnson	LB	Saint Mary's
42	Saskatchewan Roughriders	Tom MacCullum	OL	Minot State
43	Ottawa Rough Riders	Mike Boone	LB	Queen's
44	Toronto Argonauts	Peter Partchenko	T	Michigan State
45	BC Lions	Steve Thompson	RB	Rocky Mountain College
46	Edmonton Eskimos	Bruce Dorn	CB	Manitoba
47	Calgary Stampeders	Greg Knox	DB	Wilfrid Laurier
48	Calgary Stampeders	Tim Bisci	DB	Wilfrid Laurier

== 7th round ==
Pick #	CFL team	Player	Position	School
49	Hamilton Tiger-Cats	Rickey Henderson	OT	Manitoba
50	Saskatchewan Roughriders	Peter Miller	LB	Pacific (Cali.)
51	Ottawa Rough Riders	Mike Doucette	CB	Ottawa
52	Winnipeg Blue Bombers	Chris Raynor	DB	Western Ontario
53	British Columbia Lions	Mike Rend	DB	Simon Fraser
54	Edmonton Eskimos	Grant Jongejan	LB	Alberta
55	Calgary Stampeders	Craig Kittelson	TB	Calgary
56	Toronto Argonauts	Jason Schwabe	WR	Mayville State

== 8th round ==
Pick #	CFL team	Player	Position	School
57	Hamilton Tiger-Cats	Andrew Fairbairn	WR	Carleton
58	Saskatchewan Roughriders	Mike Vanderjagt	K/P	West Virginia
59	Ottawa Rough Riders	Ian Ployart	DB	Concordia
60	Winnipeg Blue Bombers	Shane Goodwin	NG	Tulsa
61	British Columbia Lions	Rod Farquharson	WR	Simon Fraser
62	Edmonton Eskimos	Todd Woodward	LB	Ohio State
63	Calgary Stampeders	James Buchanan	WR	Calgary
64	Toronto Argonauts	Hugh Lawson	DL	Wilfrid Laurier
