= Craig Hendrickson =

Canadian football player (born 1968)

No. 59, 58, 52
- Position: Offensive lineman

Personal information
- Born: May 5, 1968 (age 58); Tucson, Arizona, U.S.
- Listed height: 6 ft 3 in (1.91 m)
- Listed weight: 290 lb (132 kg)

Career information
- High school: Sahuaro (Tucson)
- College: Arizona Western (1986–1987); Minnesota (1988–1990)
- NFL draft: 1991: undrafted
- CFL draft: 1990: 3rd round, 21st overall pick

Career history
- Buffalo Bills (1991)*; Saskatchewan Roughriders (1991–1993); Buffalo Bills (1994)*; Edmonton Eskimos (1994–1995); BC Lions (1996); Winnipeg Blue Bombers (1997–1999); Toronto Argonauts (1999); BC Lions (2000–2001)
- * Offseason or practice squad member only

Awards and highlights
- Grey Cup champion (2000); First-team All-ACCAC (1987)

Craig Steven Hendrickson (born May 5, 1968) is a Canadian-American former professional football player who was an offensive lineman for 11 seasons in the Canadian Football League (CFL) with the Saskatchewan Roughriders, Edmonton Eskimos, BC Lions, Winnipeg Blue Bombers and Toronto Argonauts. He played college football at Arizona Western College and the University of Minnesota.

== Early life and college ==
Craig Steven Hendrickson was born on May 5, 1968, in Eugene, Oregon. He grew up in Vancouver and Brandon, Manitoba, Canada. He attended Neelin High School in Brandon, Manitoba and Sahuaro High School in Tucson.

Hendrickson first played college football at Arizona Western College from 1986 to 1987, earning first-team junior college All-American and All-Arizona Community College Athletic Conference honors. He then transferred to the University of Minnesota in 1988, where he played for the Golden Gophers with his brother Scott Hendrickson. In April 1988, Hendrickson was one of four University of Minnesota football players evicted from a dorm after dried blood and animal entrails were found. He redshirted in 1988 and was a two-year letterman from 1989 to 1990. As a senior in 1990, Hendrickson played left tackle, right tackle, right guard, and left guard, earning honorable mention All-Big Ten Conference honors. He majored in sociology.

== Professional career ==
Hendrickson was selected by the Saskatchewan Roughriders in the third round, with the 21st overall pick, of the 1990 CFL draft. After going undrafted in the 1991 NFL draft, he signed with the Buffalo Bills of the National Football League on April 26, 1991. He was later released on August 20, 1991. Hendrickson then returned to his hometown of Brandon and waited to see if any other NFL teams were interested in him before deciding to sign a three-year contract with the Roughriders. He was moved to the team's practice roster on September 4, 1991. He dressed in eight games, starting two late in the season after a knee injury to Roger Aldag, in 1991. Hendrickson became a starting offensive tackle in 1992 and dressed in 15 games for the league's top-rated offensive line, only allowing 33 sacks. The team finished with a 9–9 record, losing in the Western semifinal to the Edmonton Eskimos. He was a starter with his brother, Scott, on Saskatchewan's offensive line in 1993. Craig dressed in all 18 games during the 1993 season as the Roughriders went 11–7 but lost in the semifinals to the Eskimos for the second year in a row. He was named the team's outstanding offensive lineman in 1993.

Hendrickson became a free agent after the 1993 season, and signed with the Bills on April 15, 1994. He was cut by the Bills on August 28, 1994. On September 7, 1994, he signed with the Edmonton Eskimos. He had reportedly turned down an offer to join the Seattle Seahawks' practice squad, stating "I'd rather play than sit on the bench and watch or just practise." Hendrickson replaced Mike Dumaresq in Edmonton's starting lineup. Hendrickson dressed in eight games for the Eskimos during the 1994 season. He dressed in all 18 games in 1995 as the team finished 13–5 and lost in the Northern Final to the Calgary Stampeders by a score of 37–4.

On May 23, 1996, Hendrickson and Chris Vargas were traded to the BC Lions for Glen Scrivener and BC's first-round pick in the 1997 CFL draft. Hendrickson dressed in 16 games for the Lions as they went 5–13.

On April 2, 1997, Hendrickson signed with the Winnipeg Blue Bombers. He dressed in all 36 games for Winnipeg from 1997 to 1998, as the team finished 4–14 and 3–15 respectively. He dressed in the first nine games of the 1999 season for the Blue Bombers before being traded to the Toronto Argonauts on September 8, 1999, for Nigel Williams and Brad Elberg. Hendrickson dressed in the final nine games of the season for the Argonauts.

Hendrickson signed with the BC Lions in February 2000, reuniting with his brother Scott. Craig dressed in 14 games for the Lions in 2000. The team finished with an 8–10 record but advanced to the 88th Grey Cup, where they beat the Montreal Alouettes by a margin of 28–26. Hendrickson dressed in all 18 games during his final CFL season in 2001. The Lions went 8–10 again but this time lost in the Western semifinal.

Hendrickson became a free agent after the 2001 season, and retired from the CFL. He finished with career totals of 169 games dressed, 12 defensive tackles, three special teams tackles, and two receptions for 11 yards and one touchdown.

== Personal life ==
Hendrickson was a licensed minister during his CFL career. He spent 16 years as a full-time minister after his CFL career. He then became a faculty member at Moody Bible Institute and currently serves as the Executive Director of Strategic Innovations at Wesley Seminary.

Hendrickson's father Lefty Hendrickson and brother Scott Hendrickson both played in the CFL as well.
