= 1992 Toronto Argonauts season =

CFL team season

- Head coach: Adam Rita (3-8-0) Dennis Meyer (3-4-0)
- Home stadium: SkyDome

Results
- Record: 6–12
- Division place: 4th, East
- Playoffs: did not qualify

Uniform

The 1992 Toronto Argonauts finished in fourth place in the East Division with a 6–12 record and failed to make the playoffs.

== Preseason ==
Game	Date	Opponent	Results		Venue	Attendance
Game	Date	Opponent	Score	Record	Venue	Attendance
A	Fri, June 19	vs. Edmonton Eskimos	W 48–33	1–0	SkyDome	22,132
B	Thu, June 25	vs. Calgary Stampeders	L 1–20	1–1	Civic Stadium	15,362
C	Tue, June 30	at Calgary Stampeders	L 28–36	1–2	McMahon Stadium	20,194

- June 25 game vs. Calgary was in Portland, Oregon.

== Regular season ==
=== Standings ===
East Division
Pos	Team	Pld	W	L	T	PF	PA	PD	Pts	Div	Stk
1	Winnipeg Blue Bombers (C, Q)	18	11	7	0	507	499	8	22	7–3	W5
2	Hamilton Tiger-Cats (Q)	18	11	7	0	536	514	22	22	5–5	W2
3	Ottawa Rough Riders (Q)	18	9	9	0	484	439	45	18	6–4	L1
4	Toronto Argonauts	18	6	12	0	469	523	−54	12	3–7	L3

Source: "CFL.ca - Official Site of the Canadian Football League". Archived from the original on 2011-08-10.
(C) First round bye; (Q) Qualified for playoffs

=== Schedule ===
Week	Game	Date	Opponent	Results		Venue	Attendance
Week	Game	Date	Opponent	Score	Record	Venue	Attendance
1	1	Thu, July 9	at Ottawa Rough Riders	L 42–53 (OT)	0–1	Lansdowne Park	23,222
2	2	Thu, July 16	vs. BC Lions	W 61–20	1–1	SkyDome	36,682
3	3	Thu, July 23	vs. Hamilton Tiger-Cats	L 30–39	1–2	SkyDome	30,899
4	4	Thu, July 30	at Calgary Stampeders	L 26–28	1–3	McMahon Stadium	31,504
5	5	Thu, Aug 6	vs. Winnipeg Blue Bombers	W 32–6	2–3	SkyDome	32,201
6	6	Thu, Aug 13	at Winnipeg Blue Bombers	L 17–32	2–4	Winnipeg Stadium	26,714
7	7	Thu, Aug 20	at Edmonton Eskimos	L 16–39	2–5	Commonwealth Stadium	30,186
8	8	Wed, Aug 26	vs. Ottawa Rough Riders	W 24–16	3–5	SkyDome	44,922
9	9	Mon, Sept 7	at Hamilton Tiger-Cats	L 24–27	3–6	Ivor Wynne Stadium	30,003
10	10	Sun, Sept 13	vs. Calgary Stampeders	L 0–31	3–7	SkyDome	29,044
11	11	Sat, Sept 19	at BC Lions	L 29–36	3–8	BC Place Stadium	34,646
12	12	Sat, Sept 26	vs. Saskatchewan Roughriders	W 39–32	4–8	SkyDome	26,132
13	13	Sun, Oct 4	at Saskatchewan Roughriders	L 18–43	4–9	Taylor Field	22,991
14	14	Sat, Oct 10	vs. Edmonton Eskimos	W 31–14	5–9	SkyDome	33,189
15	15	Sun, Oct 18	vs. Ottawa Rough Riders	W 10–4	6–9	SkyDome	26,337
16	16	Sun, Oct 25	at Winnipeg Blue Bombers	L 23–24 (OT)	6–10	Winnipeg Stadium	30,193
17	17	Sat, Oct 31	at Ottawa Rough Riders	L 12–31	6–11	Lansdowne Park	24,694
18	18	Sun, Nov 8	vs. Hamilton Tiger-Cats	L 35–48	6–12	SkyDome	29,075

== Roster ==
1992 Toronto Argonauts final roster
Quarterbacks: 16 John Congemi; 14 Rickey Foggie; 12 Mike Kerrigan; 11 Blair Kiel; Running backs: 31 Michael Clemons; 27 Paul Nastasiuk; 5 Kevin Smellie; Receivers: 80 Eddie Brown; 84 Anthony Cooley; 3 Darian Hagan; 25 Rocket Ismail; 15 J. P. Izquierdo; 88 Paul Masotti; 86 Andrew Murray; 1 Darrell Smith	Offensive linemen: 56 Ian Beckstead C; 69 Dan Ferrone G; 63 Jim Kardash G/T; 61 Chris Green T/G; 51 Lou Olsacher G/C; 54 Blaine Schmidt T; 67 Chris Schultz T; 64 Bob Skemp G; Defensive linemen: 99 Mike Campbell DT; 76 Jeff Croonan DE; 35 Bruce Elliott DE; 70 Harold Hallman DT; 77 Rodney Harding DE; 90 Leonard Johnson DT; 78 Darryl Milburn DE; 44 Brian Warren DE	Linebackers: 73 Ken Benson; 37 Keith Castello; 42 Bruce Dickson; 36 Don Moen; Defensive backs: 13 Ed Berry; 7 Carl Brazley; 2 Reggie Pleasant; 17 Dave Van Belleghem; 20 Don Wilson; 9 Jonathan Wilson; 21 Antoine Worthman; Special teams: 4 Lance Chomyc K/P; 8 Hank Ilesic P/K; Injured list: 66 Kelvin Pruenster T; Italics indicate International player

== Awards and honours ==
=== 1992 CFL All-Stars ===
- P – Hank Ilesic, CFL All-Star
- DT – Rodney Harding, CFL All-Star
