= Sandy Annunziata =

Canadian football player

No. 65
- Position: Guard

Personal information
- Born: October 11, 1969 (age 57); Fort Erie, Ontario, Canada
- Listed height: 6 ft 2 in (1.88 m)
- Listed weight: 300 lb (136 kg)

Career information
- University: Western Ontario
- CFL draft: 1992: 5th round, 39th overall pick

Career history
- 1995–1996: Edmonton Eskimos
- 1997–1999: Winnipeg Blue Bombers
- 2000–2004: Toronto Argonauts
- 2005: Edmonton Eskimos

Awards and highlights
- 2× Grey Cup champion (2004, 2005); CFL East All-Star (2002)

Career CFL statistics
- Tackles: 7
- Special Team Tackles: 2
- Fumbles: 3
- Stats at CFL.ca (archive)

Sandy Annunziata (born October 11, 1969) is a former offensive guard and Centre in the Canadian Football League (CFL).

== Football career ==
Annunziata played four years at The University of Western Ontario (1989–1992), and was a member of their Vanier Cup winning team. He was also named to OUAA 1st team all-star selection in 1992. Sandy won two Grey Cups with the Toronto Argonauts in 2004 and the Edmonton Eskimos in 2005 during 11-year career in CFL. Signed by Edmonton in 1995, Winnipeg Blue Bombers in 1997, Toronto 2000 and Edmonton in 2005, in an 11-year professional football career he played in 166 games.

== Post-football career ==
Annunziata was elected as a town councillor in the 2006 municipal elections in Fort Erie.

In the 2014 municipal elections Annunziata was elected a Regional Councillor for Fort Erie serving his first term on Niagara Regional Council. He was elected chairman of the Niagara Peninsula Conservation Authority in January, 2017.

Annunziata is CEO of Body Science, an athlete management, media prep and consulting firm. Before starting his company in 2007, he enjoyed an 11-year professional football career in the CFL winning 2 Grey Cups and multiple individual awards. Upon retirement, he has transitioned to television and radio media as a commentator, colour analyst for TSN, a writer and columnist for Yahoo! Sports and a current event, political pundit for Newstalk 1010.

Annunziata has been actively involved in youth sports as a mentor, coach and volunteer for the past 20 years. In 2004, he created Project 65, an anti-bullying campaign that he has brought to over 75 Niagara schools.

He is a past chapter President of the Heart and Stroke Foundation and a member of several community boards including the Boys and Girls Club of Niagara, Niagara Community Foundation and the Head Injury Association of Fort Erie.

A graduate from King's College at The University of Western Ontario.

In 2009, Annunziata also co-hosted Inside The Argos, a weekly hour-long radio show on The Fan 590, every Wednesday with host Mike Hogan. From 2011 to 2013 he was the colour analyst during TSN Radio 1050's broadcast of Toronto Argonaut games with play-by-play voice, Mike Hogan. The former offensive lineman with co-host Jim Tatti, take you beyond the field and inside the locker room during Countdown to Kickoff for pre-game, halftime and post-game analysis for all Argo games.
