= 1992 Winnipeg Blue Bombers season =

Canadian football team season

- General manager: Cal Murphy
- Head coach: Urban Bowman
- Home stadium: Winnipeg Stadium

Results
- Record: 11–7
- Division place: 1st, East
- Playoffs: Lost Grey Cup

The 1992 Winnipeg Blue Bombers finished in first place in the East Division with an 11–7 record. They appeared in the Grey Cup but lost to the Calgary Stampeders.

== Offseason ==
=== CFL Draft ===
Round	Pick	Player	Position	School

== Preseason ==
Game	Date	Opponent	Results		Venue	Attendance
Game	Date	Opponent	Score	Record	Venue	Attendance
A	Fri, June 26	at Saskatchewan Roughriders	W 33–11	1–0	Taylor Field	21,161
B	Thu, July 2	vs. Ottawa Rough Riders	L 19–21	1–1	Winnipeg Stadium	33,359

== Regular season ==
=== Season standings ===
East Division
Pos	Team	Pld	W	L	T	PF	PA	PD	Pts	Div	Stk
1	Winnipeg Blue Bombers (C, Q)	18	11	7	0	507	499	8	22	7–3	W5
2	Hamilton Tiger-Cats (Q)	18	11	7	0	536	514	22	22	5–5	W2
3	Ottawa Rough Riders (Q)	18	9	9	0	484	439	45	18	6–4	L1
4	Toronto Argonauts	18	6	12	0	469	523	−54	12	3–7	L3

Source: "CFL.ca - Official Site of the Canadian Football League". Archived from the original on 2011-08-10.
(C) First round bye; (Q) Qualified for playoffs

=== Season schedule ===
Week	Date	Opponent	Result	Record
1	July 9	at Hamilton Tiger-Cats	W 36–33	1–0
2	July 16	at Ottawa Rough Riders	L 14–29	1–1
3	July 22	vs. Edmonton Eskimos	W 51–32	2–1
4	July 30	vs. BC Lions	W 41–15	3–1
5	Aug 6	at Toronto Argonauts	L 6–32	3–2
6	Aug 13	vs. Toronto Argonauts	W 32–17	4–2
7	Aug 19	at Hamilton Tiger-Cats	L 20–21	4–3
8	Aug 27	vs. Hamilton Tiger-Cats	L 35–37	4–4
9	Sept 6	at Saskatchewan Roughriders	L 20–32	4–5
10	Sept 13	vs. Saskatchewan Roughriders	W 37–16	5–5
11	Sept 20	at Calgary Stampeders	L 29–57	5–6
12	Sept 27	vs. Calgary Stampeders	W 17–16	6–6
13	Oct 2	at Edmonton Eskimos	L 25–45	6–7
14	Oct 12	at Ottawa Rough Riders	W 49–47	7–7
15	Oct 18	vs. Hamilton Tiger-Cats	W 24–15	8–7
16	Oct 25	vs. Toronto Argonauts	W 24–23	9–7
17	Oct 31	at BC Lions	W 29–26	10–7
18	Nov 8	vs. Ottawa Rough Riders	W 18–6	11–7

== Playoffs ==
=== East Final ===
Team	Q1	Q2	Q3	Q4	Total
Hamilton Tiger-Cats	10	1	0	0	11
Winnipeg Blue Bombers	14	23	6	16	59

=== Grey Cup ===
Team	Q1	Q2	Q3	Q4	Total
Calgary Stampeders	11	6	0	7	24
Winnipeg Blue Bombers	0	0	0	10	10

== Roster ==
1992 Winnipeg Blue Bombers final roster
Quarterbacks: 16 Matt Dunigan; 9 Sammy Garza; 4 Danny McManus; Running backs: 23 Craig Harrison; 37 Warren Hudson; 32 Matt Pearce; 31 Mike Richardson; Receivers: 86 Gerald Alphin; 79 Rob Crifo; 80 Lynn James; 5 Tim Jessie; 83 Andrew Martin; 85 Frank Pillow; 84 Kevin Simien; 81 Larry Thompson; 87 Gerald Wilcox	Offensive linemen: 68 Nick Benjamin G; 51 David Black T/G; 64 Miles Gorrell T; 57 Brett MacNeil G; 64 Bob Molle G; 60 Dave Vankoughnett C; 63 Chris Walby T; 50 Ray Wiens C; Defensive linemen: 99 Vaughn Booker DE; 67 Lester Brinkley DE; 54 Steve Grant NT; 52 Mike Gray DE; 44 Leon Hatziioannou NT; 77 Stan Mikawos NT; 55 Jerome Rinehart DE; Special teams: 6 Bob Cameron P; 74 Troy Westwood K	Linebackers: 3 Lorenza Baker; 34 Greg Battle; 38 Darrell Corbin; 56 Elfrid Payton; 36 Paul Randolph; 53 Brendan Rogers; 39 Chris Tsangaris; 58 James West; Defensive backs: 20 Jayson Dzikowicz; 12 Bobby Evans; 25 Kyle Hall; 10 Rod Hill; 26 Kim Phillips; 30 Darryl Sampson; 19 Donald Smith; 4 Andrew Thomas; Injured list: 7 Burt Cummings DB; Italics indicate American player

== Awards and records ==
- CFL's Most Outstanding Rookie Award – Mike Richardson (RB)

=== 1992 CFL All-Stars ===
- RB – Mike Richardson, CFL All-Star
- K – Troy Westwood, CFL All-Star
