= Steve Zatylny =

Canadian football player (born 1966)

No. 20
- Position: Wide receiver

Personal information
- Born: January 1, 1966 (age 60); Montreal, Quebec, Canada
- Listed height: 5 ft 10 in (1.78 m)
- Listed weight: 185 lb (84 kg)

Career information
- CEGEP: Vanier College
- University: Bishop's
- CFL draft: 1990: 6th round, 43rd overall pick

Career history
- 1990–1991: Winnipeg Blue Bombers

Awards and highlights
- Grey Cup champion (1990)

Steve Zatylny (born January 1, 1966) is a Canadian former professional football wide receiver who played two seasons with the Winnipeg Blue Bombers of the Canadian Football League (CFL). He was selected by the Blue Bombers in the sixth round of the 1990 CFL draft. He played CIAU football at Bishop's University.

== Early life ==
Steve Zatylny was born on January 1, 1966, in Montreal, Quebec.

Zatylny played CEGEP football for the Vanier Cheetahs of Vanier College from 1984 to 1985. He played CIAU football for the Bishop's Gaiters of Bishop's University.

== Professional career ==
Zatylny was selected by the Winnipeg Blue Bombers with the 43rd pick in the 1990 CFL draft. He played for the Blue Bombers from 1990 to 1991, winning the 78th Grey Cup in 1990.

== Personal life ==
Zatylny's brother Wally Zatylny also played in the CFL.

In February 2023, Zatylny pled guilty to two counts related to "sexual interference with a minor" between 2002 and 2004; he was sentenced to 42 months in prison. He had previously worked as a student activities coordinator at Bishop's College School.
