= Ian Beckles =

Canadian gridiron football player (born 1967)

No. 62, 73
- Position: Guard

Personal information
- Born: July 20, 1967 (age 59); Montreal, Quebec, Canada
- Listed height: 6 ft 1 in (1.85 m)
- Listed weight: 310 lb (141 kg)

Career information
- High school: Pointe-Claire (QC) Lindsay Place
- College: Waldorf (1986–1987); Indiana (1988–1989)
- NFL draft: 1990: 5th round, 114th overall pick
- CFL draft: 1990: 1st round, 2nd overall pick

Career history
- Tampa Bay Buccaneers (1990–1996); Philadelphia Eagles (1997–1998); New York Jets (1999)*; Denver Broncos (2000)*
- * Offseason or practice squad member only

Awards and highlights
- First-team All-Big Ten (1989)

Career NFL statistics
- Games played: 126
- Games Started: 121
- Fumble recoveries: 9
- Stats at Pro Football Reference

Ian Harold Beckles (born July 20, 1967) is a Canadian former professional football player who was a guard for nine seasons in the National Football League (NFL). Beckles was the co-host of the highly-rated Beckles and Recher Show on iHeartMedia, Inc.'s WDAE (620 AM and 95.3 FM) in Tampa, Florida. Beckles was the host of his own program, The Ian Beckles Show on 102.5 The Bone on Sundays.

== Early life and college ==
Beckles' family emigrated to Canada in 1964. His mother (who passed in early 2009) was native of Guyana, while his father hails from Trinidad. Beckles grew up with his mother in a single-parent home in Montreal and played hockey and baseball as a youth (among his friends was future NFL fullback and Buc teammate Alonzo Highsmith). However, after playing football in high school, Beckles excelled and went on to play junior college football at Waldorf College in Forest City, Iowa, earning all-conference honors as a sophomore.

Beckles later transferred to Indiana and became a standout guard during the 1989 season — his only as a starter. During Beckles' senior year, Indiana produced one of nation's top rushing attacks (214.5 yards per game). Beckles blocked for future NFL quarterback Trent Green, running backs Vaughn Dunbar (an NFL first-round pick) and Anthony Thompson (who won the Maxwell Award player of the year award in 1989), and Ernie Thompson, and alongside standout center Ron Vargo, who played briefly for the Arena Football League's Cleveland Thunderbolts in the early 1990s. Beckles received attention from NFL scouts as a senior when they turned to film from Indiana to scout, primarily, Thompson. As the team's primary pulling lineman, Beckles stood out on film.

Beckles graduated from IU with a BS in business.

== Professional football career ==
Pre-draft measurables
Height	Weight	Arm length	Hand span	40-yard dash	10-yard split	20-yard split	20-yard shuttle	Vertical jump	Broad jump	Bench press
6 ft 1 in (1.85 m)	296 lb (134 kg)	31 1/2 in (0.80 m)	9 1/2 in (0.24 m)	5.23 s	1.84 s	3.00 s	4.81 s	26.5 in (0.67 m)	8 ft 3 in (2.51 m)	26 reps

Following Indiana, Beckles was selected in the fifth round of the 1990 NFL draft and the first round of the 1990 CFL draft, and started immediately for the Tampa Bay Buccaneers at right guard.

Beckles started seven seasons with the Bucs. During his time, the Bucs had 1,000 yard rushers in Reggie Cobb (1992) and Errict Rhett (1994, 1995). Beckles, who wore jersey no. 62, departed as a free agent after the 1996 season, signing a deal with the Philadelphia Eagles.

Beckles started two seasons for the Eagles at right guard. Ricky Watters had 1,000 yard seasons in each of Beckles' seasons as a starter with Philadelphia under offensive coordinator Jon Gruden.

Beckles signed with the New York Jets in 1999, but was released prior to the season. Head coach Bill Parcells criticized Beckles' conditioning during his time in New York. Parcells, however, told Beckles he would keep him as a veteran backup to the young guards. Beckles told Parcells, at that point in his career, his heart was not in the game enough to be a reserve.

After being out of football in 1999, Beckles was in camp with the Denver Broncos for approximately one month in 2000. Beckles retired after suffering severe cramping due to dehydration.

== Publishing, podcasting, and business ventures ==
In addition to his other charitable and private ventures, Beckles was the publisher and editor-in-chief of What's Hot Tampa Bay Magazine, formerly As.I.Be Magazine, and once published his own website "Flavor of Tampa Bay."

He currently hosts two podcasts, "In the Trenches," where he comments on the Buccaneers and other NFL News, as well as the "Plant Power Podcast," where he interviews movers and shakers in alternative medicine and healing. Beckles is a staunch advocate of marijuana legalization.

Ian established the Dignitary brand in 2015. His Dignitary Tea and Kava House in South Tampa filled a niche in the South Tampa neighborhood where he currently lives. The establishment has attracted many customers from various walks of life, and has become an alternative to bars that sell alcohol.
