= Glen Young (gridiron football) =

Canadian gridiron football player and coach (born 1969)

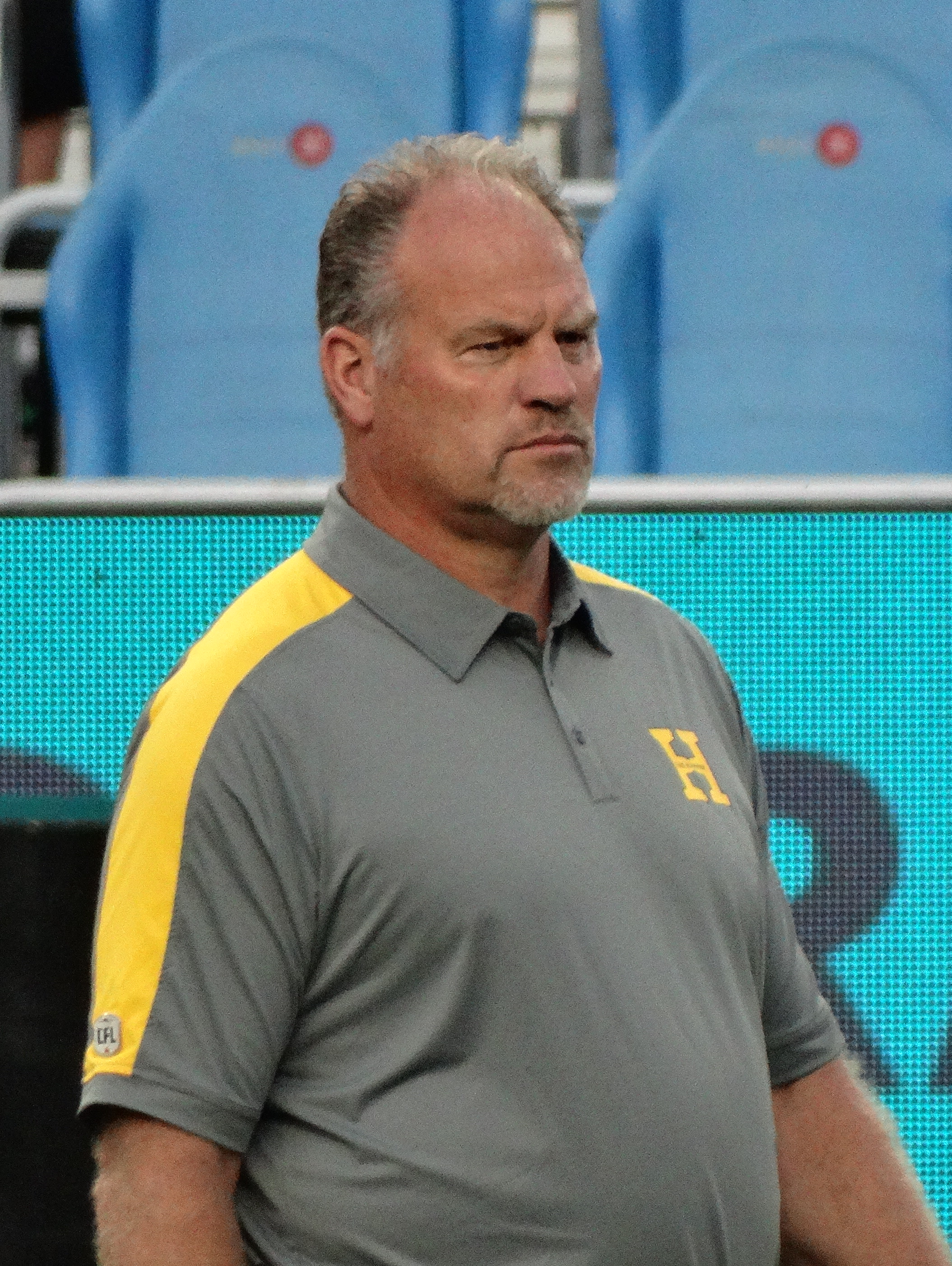
- Young with the Hamilton Tiger-Cats in 2024

BC Lions
- Title: Linebackers coach
- CFL status: National

Personal information
- Born: May 2, 1969 (age 57); Scarborough, Ontario, Canada
- Listed height: 6 ft 3 in (1.91 m)
- Listed weight: 250 lb (113 kg)

Career information
- College: Syracuse
- CFL draft: 1992: 3rd round, 22nd overall pick

Career history

Playing
- 1993: Los Angeles Raiders*
- 1994: Buffalo Bills*
- 1994–1996: San Diego Chargers
- 1997: Seattle Seahawks*
- 1998–2000: Toronto Argonauts
- 2001: Montreal Alouettes
- 2002–2005: Edmonton Eskimos
- * Offseason or practice squad member only

Coaching
- 2016–2017: Winnipeg Blue Bombers (Linebackers coach)
- 2018–2019: Winnipeg Blue Bombers (Linebackers and defensive line coach)
- 2020–2021: Toronto Argonauts (Defensive coordinator)
- 2024: Hamilton Tiger-Cats (Defensive line coach)
- 2025–present: BC Lions (Linebackers coach)

Awards and highlights
- 2× Grey Cup champion (2003, 2005)
- Stats at Pro Football Reference
- Stats at CFL.ca (archive)

Glen Young (born May 2, 1969) is a Canadian professional football coach and former player who is the linebackers coach for the BC Lions of the Canadian Football League (CFL).

Pre-draft measurables
Height	Weight	Arm length	Hand span	40-yard dash	10-yard split	20-yard split	20-yard shuttle	Vertical jump	Broad jump	Bench press
6 ft 3 1/4 in (1.91 m)	238 lb (108 kg)	31 1/4 in (0.79 m)	10 in (0.25 m)	4.90 s	1.70 s	2.85 s	4.14 s	34.0 in (0.86 m)	10 ft 1 in (3.07 m)	21 reps
All values from NFL Combine

He played as a linebacker for eight seasons in the CFL for the Toronto Argonauts, Montreal Alouettes, and Edmonton Eskimos, from 1998 to 2005. Prior to his time in the CFL, he played two seasons in the National Football League (NFL) for the San Diego Chargers, from 1995 to 1996.

== Coaching career ==
=== Toronto Argonauts ===
On February 6, 2020, it was announced that Young had joined the Toronto Argonauts as the team's defensive coordinator. After the 2020 CFL season was cancelled, he coached through part of the 2021 Toronto Argonauts season, but was not retained for 2022.

=== Hamilton Tiger-Cats ===
On February 2, 2024, it was announced that Young had joined the Hamilton Tiger-Cats to serve as the team's defensive line coach.

=== BC Lions ===
On January 2, 2025, it was announced that Young had joined the BC Lions to serve as the team's linebackers coach.
