= Richard Nurse =

Trinidadian gridiron football player (born 1966)

Profile
- Position: Wide receiver

Personal information
- Born: March 13, 1966 (age 60); Trinidad and Tobago
- Listed height: 5 ft 11 in (1.80 m)
- Listed weight: 182 lb (83 kg)

Career information
- College: Canisius College
- CFL draft: 1990: 3rd round, 23rd overall pick

Career history
- 1990–1995: Hamilton Tiger-Cats

Richard Nurse (born March 13, 1966) is a Canadian former wide receiver who played in the Canadian Football League (CFL). He was selected by the Hamilton Tiger-Cats in the third round of the 1990 CFL draft. Born in Trinidad and Tobago, Nurse was raised in Hamilton, Ontario. He played college football for the Canisius Golden Griffins.

== Professional career ==
Nurse was selected 23rd overall in the third round by the Hamilton Tiger-Cats of the Canadian Football League. He played in 103 games for the Tiger-Cats from 1990 to 1995. For his career, he had 59 catches for 741 yards and six touchdowns.

== Personal life ==
In 1993, the Tiger-Cats presented Nurse with the Charlotte Simmons Humanitarian Awarded for his donation of time and energy to the betterment of the local Hamilton community.

His son, Darnell Nurse, was selected in the First round of the 2013 NHL entry draft by the Edmonton Oilers. His daughter, Kia Nurse, who played basketball collegiately for the Connecticut Huskies, plays professionally for the Toronto Tempo in the WNBA and won a gold medal at the 2015 Pan American Games with the Canadian women's national team. His sister, Raquel, is married to former NFL quarterback Donovan McNabb. As well, his niece, Sarah Nurse, competed on Team Canada's national women's hockey team at the 2018 Winter Olympics and the 2022 Winter Olympics, and his nephew Isaac Nurse, Sarah's brother, captained the Hamilton Bulldogs hockey team.
