= Wally Zatylny =

Canadian football player (born 1964)

No. 21, 80
- Position: Wide receiver

Personal information
- Born: March 25, 1964 (age 62); Montreal, Quebec, Canada
- Listed height: 5 ft 9 in (1.75 m)
- Listed weight: 180 lb (82 kg)

Career information
- High school: Macdonald-Cartier (Saint-Hubert, Quebec)
- University: Bishop's
- CFL draft: 1988: 4th round, 28th overall pick

Career history
- Calgary Stampeders (1988)*; Hamilton Tiger-Cats (1988–1992); Toronto Argonauts (1993); Hamilton Tiger-Cats (1994–1995)
- * Offseason or practice squad member only

Awards and highlights
- CFL East All-Star (1989)

Walter Zatylny (born March 25, 1964) is a Canadian former professional football wide receiver who played eight seasons in the Canadian Football League (CFL) with the Hamilton Tiger-Cats and Toronto Argonauts. He played CIAU football at Bishop's University.

== Early life ==
Walter Zatylny was born on March 25, 1964, in Montreal. He attended Macdonald-Cartier High School in Saint-Hubert, Quebec. He played CEGEP football at Champlain College Lennoxville in Sherbrooke, Quebec.

Zatylny played CIAU football for the Bishop's Gaiters of Bishop's University from 1985 to 1987 as a wide receiver, punt returner, and kickoff returner. He scored 20 touchdowns in 21 career games. He was a three-time OQIFC all-star and also an All-Canadian in 1986. Zatylny led the country in yards per reception in 1987 and was named the best Quebec university football player. He graduated from Bishop's with a Bachelor of Arts in 1987. He was inducted into the school's athletics hall of fame in 2001.

== Professional career ==
Zatylny was selected by the Calgary Stampeders in the fourth round, with the 28th overall pick, of the 1988 CFL draft. On July 9, 1988, it was reported that he had been traded to the Hamilton Tiger-Cats for Mike Rodrigues. He dressed in 79 games for the Tiger-Cats from 1988 to 1992. Zatylny earned CFL East All-Star honors in 1989 as a returner. He caught the game-deciding touchdown in the 1989 Eastern Final, helping the Tiger-Cats beat the Winnipeg Blue Bombers by a score of 14–10. He became a free agent after the 1992 season.

Zatylny signed with the Toronto Argonauts on May 31, 1993. Zatylny dressed in 16 games for Toronto during the 1993 season.

In March 1994, Zatylny was traded back to the Tiger-Cats for future considerations. He dressed in 26 games during his final two CFL seasons. He only dressed in seven games in 1995 due a knee-injury suffered in the season opener. He announced his retirement on January 29, 1996. He was a fan favorite during his seven seasons in Hamilton. Zatylny finished his CFL career with totals of 121 games dressed, 104 receptions for 1,764 yards and ten touchdowns, 182 kickoff returns for 3,373 yards and one touchdown, 224 punt returns for 1,777 yards and three touchdowns, and 38 tackles. He set Hamilton's career record for kickoff return yards.

== Personal life ==
At the time of his CFL retirement, Zatylny was working as a traveling sales manager for a footwear and outdoor apparel company. He has also worked as a Canadian football colour commentator. In 2000, he ran for Hamilton city council but was not elected.

Zatylny's brother Steve Zatylny also played in the CFL.
