= Lindsay Place High School =

High school in Quebec, Canada

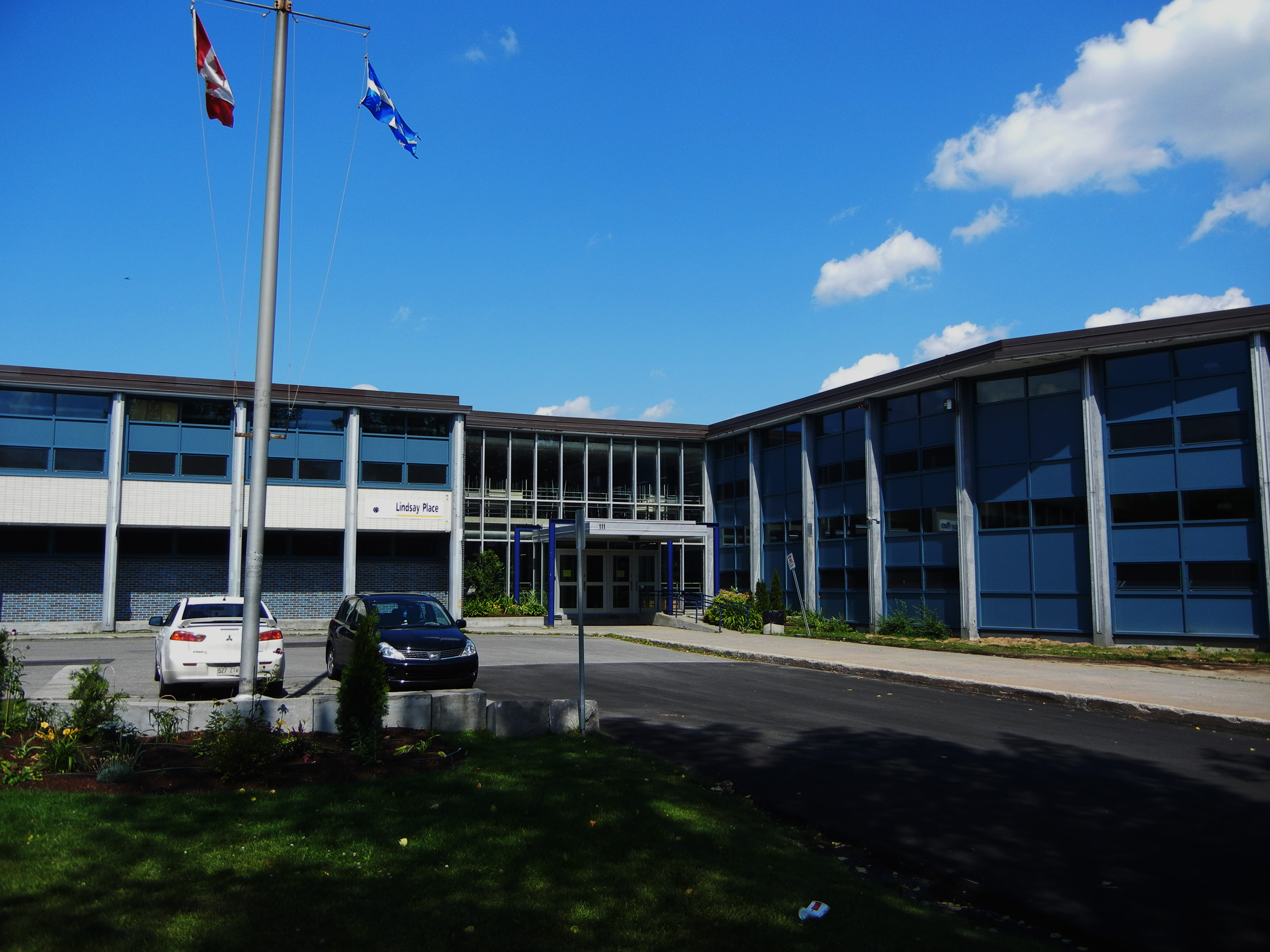
- Lindsay Place High School in June 2012

Location
- 111 Broadview Avenue, Pointe-Claire, Quebec, H9R 3Z3; Canada; 45°27′23″N 73°47′49″W

Information
- School type: High School
- Founded: 1962
- Closed: 2021
- School board: Lester B. Pearson School Board
- Principal: Kerry-Ann Payette (2018-2021)
- Staff: < 50
- Grades: Secondary I-V
- Enrollment: < 400 (2021)
- Language: English
- Colours: Red, White and Black
- Team name: Eagles
- Website: lindsayplace.lbpsb.qc.ca

Lindsay Place High School (LPHS) was a public high school situated in Pointe-Claire, Quebec, on the island of Montreal. It was part of the Lester B. Pearson School Board.

It opened in September 1962, named after Lindsay H. Place, a Montreal judge who volunteered for the Protestant School Commission, as it was then known.

In the 2006–2007 school year the school began offering a new program to students interested in music. The program consisted of private lessons, multiple before school rehearsals and music theory and history classes, called the Arts-Etude program.

The Lester B. Pearson School Board moved St. Thomas High School students into Lindsay Place High School on Broadview Avenue in Pointe-Claire in July 2021.

== Notable alumni ==
- Bruce Dowbiggin, journalist and sportscaster
- Greg Fergus, politician
- Ian Beckles, NFL Football Player

• Mark Hardy, NHL player
