= 1990 CFL draft =

Canadian football draft

The 1990 CFL draft composed of eight rounds where 64 Canadian football players were chosen from eligible Canadian universities and Canadian players playing in the NCAA.

== 1st round ==
= CFL Division All-Star	= CFL All-Star	= Hall of Famer

Pick #	CFL team	Player	Position	School
1	Edmonton Eskimos	Sean Millington	RB	Simon Fraser
2	BC Lions	Ian Beckles	G/DT	Indiana
3	Saskatchewan Roughriders	Glen Scrivener	DE/DT	William Jewell
4	Toronto Argonauts	Jock Climie	WR	Queen's
5	Calgary Stampeders	Dave Sapunjis	SB	Western Ontario
6	Edmonton Eskimos	Steve Christie	P/K	William & Mary
7	Hamilton Tiger-Cats	Mark Dennis	LB	Central Michigan
8	Saskatchewan Roughriders	Dane McArthur	SB/RB	Hawaii-Manoa

== 2nd round ==
9. Saskatchewan Roughriders Bruce Boyko SB/TE Western Michigan

10. British Columbia Lions Ken Whitney G/TE California Lutheran

11. Winnipeg Blue Bombers Dave Boveil CB/S Carleton

12. British Columbia Lions Keith Kelly TB Bishop's

13. Calgary Stampeders Mark Singer LB/FB Alberta

14. Edmonton Eskimos Bob MacDonald T/LS McMaster

15. Saskatchewan Roughriders Chris Gioskos T/G Ottawa

16. Saskatchewan Roughriders Brent Chuhaniuk P/K Weber State

== 3rd round ==
17. Toronto Argonauts Paul Kerr DE/DT McGill

18. Calgary Stampeders Pat Hinds T/G San Jose State

19. Winnipeg Blue Bombers Allan Boyko WR Western Michigan

20. Toronto Argonauts John Yule LB Manitoba

21. Saskatchewan Roughriders Craig Henderson T/G Minnesota

22. Edmonton Eskimos Lance Trumble FB/DE McMaster

23. Hamilton Tiger-Cats Richard Nurse WR/DB Canisius

24. Saskatchewan Roughriders Bill Hitchcock T/DT Purdue

== 4th round ==
= CFL Division All-Star	= CFL All-Star	= Hall of Famer

Pick #	CFL team	Player	Position	School
25	Ottawa Rough Riders	Michael Philbrick	DE	Carleton
26	BC Lions	Carl Coulter	G/LB	Carleton
27	Calgary Stampeders	Derek Sang	T	San Diego State
28	Toronto Argonauts	Dave Van Belleghem	DB	Calgary
29	Calgary Stampeders	Richard Chen	HB/PR	Waterloo
30	Edmonton Eskimos	Gordon Steeves	DB	Manitoba
31	Hamilton Tiger-Cats	Kevin King	DB/LB	Simon Fraser
32	Saskatchewan Roughriders	Paul Bushley	FB/HB	Colgate

== 5th round ==
= CFL Division All-Star	= CFL All-Star	= Hall of Famer

Pick #	CFL team	Player	Position	School
33	Ottawa Rough Riders	Al Neufeld	G	Saskatchewan
34	BC Lions	Mohammed Elewonibi	T	Brigham Young
35	Winnipeg Blue Bombers	Dave Vandersloot	T	Henderson State
36	Toronto Argonauts	Bill Madden	DB	Wilfrid Laurier
37	Calgary Stampeders	Rob Godley	FS/FR	Western Ontario
38	Edmonton Eskimos	Jordan Gaertner	DB	Saskatchewan
39	Hamilton Tiger-Cats	Scott Douglas	DB/LB	Western Ontario
40	Saskatchewan Roughriders	Paul Chapman	RB/FB	Dickinson State

== 6th round ==
41. Ottawa Rough Riders Cam Sackschewsky G/T Calgary

42. British Columbia Lions Doug Shorman LB British Columbia

43. Winnipeg Blue Bombers Steve Zatylny WR Bishop's

44. Toronto Argonauts Gerry Ifill TB McGill

45. Calgary Stampeders Kevin Kazan WR/K Calgary

46. Edmonton Eskimos Chris Porter TB Windsor

47. Hamilton Tiger-Cats John Monaco TB/SB Canisius

48. Ottawa Rough Riders Brett Wilson WR Ottawa

== 7th round ==
49. Ottawa Rough Riders Jamie Coombs DL/G Carleton

50. British Columbia Lions Phil Poirer DT/DE Cincinnati

51. Winnipeg Blue Bombers Lorne McCasin DE/DT North Dakota

52. Toronto Argonauts Richard MacLean T Saint Mary's

53. Calgary Stampeders Randy Power LB Mount Allison

54. Edmonton Eskimos Maki Katsube SB/RB St. Francis Xavier

55. Hamilton Tiger-Cats Jeff Martens OL/DT Alberta

56. Ottawa Rough Riders Hagen Mehnert LB McGill

== 8th round ==
57. Ottawa Rough Riders Darryl Forde CB/DB Western Ontario

58. British Columbia Lions Richard Kitchener OT/OL Simon Fraser

59. Winnipeg Blue Bombers Ray Wiens OL Saskatchewan

60. Toronto Argonauts Marco Arbour LB Ottawa

61. Calgary Stampeders Sean Furlong WR Calgary

62. Edmonton Eskimos Ron Webert P/K Washington State

63. Hamilton Tiger-Cats Mike Raymond FB York

64. Ottawa Rough Riders Mike Koladich LB Western Ontario
