= Zock Allen =

American gridiron football player (born 1968)

Profile
- Position: Linebacker

Personal information
- Born: June 12, 1968 (age 58); Madisonville, Texas, U.S.
- Listed height: 6 ft 1 in (1.85 m)
- Listed weight: 220 lb (100 kg)

Career information
- College: Texas A&M–Kingsville

Career history
- 1991–1994: BC Lions
- 1994: Las Vegas Posse
- 1995: Saskatchewan Roughriders*
- * Offseason or practice squad member only

Zock Alexander Allen (born June 12, 1968) is an American former professional football linebacker who played for the BC Lions and the Las Vegas Posse of the Canadian Football League (CFL). From 1991 to 1994, he played in 27 regular season games, recording 119 tackles, four sacks, and two fumble recoveries. He played college football for the Texas A&M–Kingsville Javelinas.

== College career ==
Allen played college football for the Texas A&M–Kingsville Javelinas, earning letters in 1989 and 1990. He led the team in total tackles with 101 during his senior season in 1990.

== Professional career ==
Both Willie Pless and Alondra Johnson, two of the BC Lions' starting linebackers in 1990, did not return to the team in 1991. The BC Lions signed Allen in May 1991 to compete for one of these spots. Despite suffering a bruised knee during the preseason, Allen succeeded in making the active roster. He struggled in July and August, with Lions head coach Bob O'Billovich saying "he's been a step or two away all the time on pass coverage". In late August, the Lions moved Allen to the practice squad and replaced him with new signing Bruce Holmes, who had led the CFL in tackles the previous season with the Ottawa Rough Riders. Allen finished his rookie season with 31 tackles, two sacks, and a fumble recovery over six games played.

In 1992, Allen began the season on the practice squad while he recovered from a knee injury, but he replaced Doug Hocking as a starter in Week 3. By late August, the Lions were facing the return of several key import players, including Stewart Hill and Lee Johnson. To meet CFL import ratio requirements, which require each team to field a certain number of Canadian players, the Lions replaced Allen again with Hocking. Allen's season was hampered both by his early injury and import ratio troubles, limiting him to three games in which he recorded 13 tackles. While on the practice squad, the Calgary Stampeders, Winnipeg Blue Bombers, and Toronto Argonauts tried to recruit him, but he declined to leave the Lions.

Allen played as an inside linebacker throughout the preseason in 1993, but he was again cut to the practice squad before the start of the regular season. He was quickly brought back to the active roster and recorded five tackles in the Lions' season-opening win against the Toronto Argonauts. Allen saw regular playing time for the first time in his career, playing in fifteen regular season games for the Lions. He played mostly as a middle linebacker, but he briefly replaced Tyrone Jones twice at the outside linebacker position while he was recovering illness and injury. Allen finished the regular season with 67 tackles, two interceptions, and a fumble recovery. He also recovered a fumble in the Western Semi-Final, but the Lions went on to lose 9–17 to the Stampeders.

During the offseason, the Lions released two linebackers while a third retired and a fourth left during free agency. Allen was selected during training camp to call defensive plays as the sole remaining linebacker, with Lions head coach Dave Ritchie saying " Zock has to be a leader now". He was instead hobbled by a knee injury, forcing him to miss practice, a preseason game, and the start of the regular season. Allen ended up playing only two regular season games for the Lions in 1994. He was eventually released and later added by the Las Vegas Posse in November, for whom he played in one game. He signed with the Saskatchewan Roughriders for 1995 but was released before the start of the regular season.

== Personal life ==
Allen was named "Zock" after the sound a cartoon character makes when hitting something. Outside of football, Allen earned a degree in teaching and spent some time performing investigative work for a law firm.
