= Tyrone Williams (wide receiver) =

Canadian gridiron football player (born 1970)

No. 86, 83, 81
- Position: Wide receiver

Personal information
- Born: March 26, 1970 (age 56); Halifax, Nova Scotia, Canada
- Listed height: 6 ft 6 in (1.98 m)
- Listed weight: 207 lb (94 kg)

Career information
- High school: Queen Elizabeth (Halifax)
- University: Western Ontario
- NFL draft: 1992: 9th round, 239th overall pick
- CFL draft: 1992: 1st round, 7th overall pick

Career history
- Phoenix Cardinals (1992)*; Dallas Cowboys (1992–1993); Chicago Bears (1994)*; Buffalo Bills (1995)*; Calgary Stampeders (1995); Toronto Argonauts (1996); Miami Dolphins (1997)*
- * Offseason or practice squad member only

Awards and highlights
- 2× Super Bowl champion (XXVII, XXVIII); Grey Cup champion (1996); 2× All-Canadian (1990, 1991); 2× All-OUA (1990, 1991)

Career NFL statistics
- Receptions: 1
- Receiving yards: 25
- Stats at Pro Football Reference

Tyrone Robert Williams (born March 26, 1970) is a Canadian former professional football player who was a wide receiver in the National Football League (NFL) for the Dallas Cowboys. He also was a member of the Calgary Stampeders and Toronto Argonauts in the Canadian Football League (CFL). He is the first player to win a Vanier Cup, a Super Bowl and a Grey Cup. He played university football at the University of Western Ontario.

== Early life ==
Williams attended Queen Elizabeth High School (Halifax, Nova Scotia), where he played competitive football, soccer and basketball. In football, he was an All-star selection at both quarterback and wide receiver. As a senior, he also was an All-star selection at forward on the basketball team.

== University career ==
Williams was recruited by University of Western Ontario football coach Larry Haylor in 1988. He made an immediate impact in his first season with the Mustangs, setting a team receiving record for most yards per catch with 21.9, and was named an Ontario Universities Athletic Association (OUAA) second-team all-star.

Williams was named an OUAA all-star again in 1989, a season in which the Mustangs won their fifth Vanier Cup title. Williams caught five passes for 157 yards and a touchdown to earn the Ted Morris Memorial Trophy as the game's most outstanding player as Western beat the Saskatchewan Huskies 35–10 to win the Canadian Interuniversity Athletic Union football championship. Williams earned All-Canadian honours in 1990 and again 1991, and graduated Western with a degree in economics, and school records for most receptions and most yards receiving. Those records stood for nearly two decades until they were surpassed by future CFL star Andy Fantuz.

Williams' accomplishments in Canada caught the attention of American scouts, and after his final season at Western ended, he received an invitation to play in the Senior Bowl in Birmingham, Alabama. Williams was the first Canadian university player to earn an invitation to the annual showcase for graduating US college football players. He caught a 36-yard touchdown pass in a 13-10 AFC victory, the game's only offensive touchdown, earning him the AT&T Long Distance Play of the Game for the longest play of the game.

== National Football League ==
=== Phoenix Cardinals ===
Williams was selected by the Calgary Stampeders seventh overall in the first round of the CFL draft in February 1992, but decided to wait for the NFL draft in April before deciding on his professional future. He was selected by the Phoenix Cardinals in the ninth round (239th overall) of the 1992 NFL draft, becoming the first Canadian Interuniversity Athletic Union player selected in the NFL draft since the Los Angeles Rams selected offensive lineman Mike Schad of the Queen's University Golden Gaels in the first round (23rd overall) in 1986. Not since University of Toronto Varsity Blues quarterback Dan Feraday, who was selected in the 12th round by the Cincinnati Bengals in 1982, had a skill-position player from a Canadian university been taken by an NFL team.

Williams was not the first Western graduate to go to the NFL. Future Canadian Football Hall of Fame inductee Joe Krol played two games with the Detroit Lions in 1945, and offensive guard Dave Sparenberg played one game for the Cleveland Browns as a replacement player during the National Football League Players Association strike in 1987. Nor was Williams the first Mustang to be drafted by the NFL. Linebacker John Priestner was an 11th round pick (280th overall) of the Baltimore Colts in 1979. Priestner did not play in any regular season games with the Colts and returned to Canada to play for the Hamilton Tiger-Cats.

Williams' NFL career did not start off smoothly. In 1992, he missed the first two weeks of the Cardinals training camp because his work visa did not arrive, and after falling behind the competition, he was waived on September 1.

=== Dallas Cowboys ===
On September 2, 1992, Williams was signed by the Dallas Cowboys to the team's practice squad. During the season he never dressed for a regular or playoff game. Although he was deactivated, he earned his first Super Bowl ring watching from the sidelines as the Cowboys crushed the Buffalo Bills 52–17 in Super Bowl XXVII.

In 1993, the on-field high point of Williams' time with Dallas came on August 8, when he hooked up with quarterback Jason Garrett for 5 catches and 157 yards, including a game-tying 53-yard touchdown pass in the Cowboys' 13–13 tie with the Detroit Lions in a preseason game at Wembley Stadium in London, England. He dressed for 9 games during the Cowboys' 1993 regular season, and played in 5 games catching one pass for 25 yards. The Cowboys earned a berth in Super Bowl XXVIII, but Williams was relegated to the inactive list when the team decided to dress an extra running back. He did not play in the game, but earned a second Super Bowl ring as the Cowboys defeated the Bills 30–13 to win their second consecutive NFL championship.

On July 11, 1994, Williams parted with the Cowboys, and was claimed by the Chicago Bears on July 12, but he was released during the team's final cuts.

After sitting out the 1994 season, Williams was invited to the Buffalo Bills training camp on January 26, 1995. He was released on August 26, and decided to look for new opportunities back in Canada.

== Canadian Football League ==
=== Calgary Stampeders ===
On September 12, 1995, after leaving Buffalo's training camp which finished midway through the CFL season, he signed with the Calgary Stampeders, which still retained his negotiation rights from the 1992 CFL draft. He joined former Mustangs teammate Dave Sapunjis in the Stampeders receiving corps, registering six passes for 81 yards and one touchdown in seven games. The team nearly won the CFL's championship in his first year in the league, catching one pass for 13 yards in Calgary's 37–20 loss to the Baltimore Stallions in the 83rd Grey Cup.

=== Toronto Argonauts ===
On May 23, 1996, Williams was acquired by the Toronto Argonauts in exchange for the negotiation rights to quarterback Dave Dickenson. Williams enjoyed his finest professional season, playing a full schedule and catching passes for almost 900 yards. Led by quarterback Doug Flutie, the Argonauts cruised to a 15–3 record and won the 84th Grey Cup over the Edmonton Eskimos 43–37. With the victory, Williams became the first player to win the Vanier Cup, the Super Bowl and the Grey Cup.

== Retirement ==
On March 11, 1997, the Miami Dolphins of the National Football League signed Williams to a two-year contract as a free agent. He chose to retire in May of that year and was released on May 12. Retiring from pro football at the age of 27, he never gave an official explanation for his decision.

== Career statistics ==
Season	Team	League	GP	REC	YDS	AVG	TD
1988	Western Ontario	OUAA	X	27	592	21.9	2
1989	Western Ontario	OUAA	X	27	550	20.4	2
1990	Western Ontario	OUAA	X	27	504	18.7	4
1991	Western Ontario	OUAA	X	21	432	20.6	1
1992	Phoenix Cardinals	NFL
1992	Dallas Cowboys	NFL
1993	Dallas Cowboys	NFL	5	1	25	25.0	0
1994	Chicago Bears	NFL
1995	Buffalo Bills	NFL
1995	Calgary Stampeders	CFL	7	6	81	13.5	1
1996	Toronto Argonauts	CFL	18	60	895	14.9	8
1997	Miami Dolphins	NFL
	OUAA totals		X	102	2078	20.4	9
	NFL totals		5	1	25	25.0	0
	CFL totals		25	66	976	14.8	9

== Personal life ==
In recognition of his accomplishments as an amateur and professional athlete, Williams was inducted into the Nova Scotia Sports Hall of Fame in 2004. His uncle is Tommy Kane who played wide receiver in the NFL for the Seattle Seahawks. Williams works as a substitute teacher in the Halifax Regional Centre for Education.
