= Body Science =

Australian maker of dietary supplements and related products

- Company type: Subsidiary
- Industry: Food processing
- Founded: 1999; 27 years ago
- Founders: Greg Young; Sheree Young
- Fate: Acquired by Humble Group in 2022, becoming a brand.
- Headquarters: Gold Coast, Queensland, Australia
- Key people: Nathan Picklum
- Products: Protein powders, Energy bars, Sports drinks
- Number of employees: 50
- Parent: Humble Group
- Website: bscsupplements.com

Body Science, stylized as BODYSCIENCE or BSc, is an Australian manufacturer of sports nutrition products and dietary supplements. The company was established in 1999 and was acquired by Swedish-based consumer goods company Humble Group in 2022.

== History ==
Body Science was co-founded by Greg and Sheree Young in 1999 and is based in Burleigh Heads, Queensland. Body Science was the 1st Australian brand to work with both Informed Sport & HASTA for 3rd party testing of sports supplements for banned substances.

In 2004, the company added compression garments and other sportswear.

Humble Group, based in Sweden, acquired Body Science in the summer of 2022.

Sheree Young is the CEO of Body Science.

== Partnerships ==
In 2023, Body Science and the Canterbury-Bankstown Bulldogs announced a two-year extension to their partnership. The two have been partners since November 2003.
