= Scott Hendrickson =

Canadian football player (born 1970)

No. 59, 63
- Position: Offensive lineman

Personal information
- Born: January 25, 1970 (age 56); Brandon, Manitoba, Canada
- Listed height: 6 ft 3 in (1.91 m)
- Listed weight: 275 lb (125 kg)

Career information
- High school: Sahuaro (Tucson, Arizona, U.S.)
- College: Minnesota
- CFL draft: 1992: 2nd round, 15th overall pick

Career history
- Saskatchewan Roughriders (1992–1997); BC Lions (1998–2000)

Scott Hendrickson (born January 25, 1970) is a Canadian former professional football player who was an offensive lineman for nine seasons in the Canadian Football League (CFL) with the Saskatchewan Roughriders and BC Lions. He played college football at the University of Minnesota.

== Early life and college ==
Scott Hendrickson was born on January 25, 1970, in Brandon, Manitoba. He attended Sahuaro High School in Tucson, Arizona.

Hendrickson played college football for the Minnesota Golden Gophers of the University of Minnesota with his brother Craig Hendrickson. He was redshirted in 1988. Although he was on the main roster from 1989 to 1991, he only earned a letter in 1990. Hendrickson played multiple offensive line positions in college. He was the team's starting center for part of the 1991 season, but did not earn a letter. On November 23, 1991, Hendricksom was involved in an on-field fight with Iowa Hawkeyes defensive lineman Mike Wells. Hendrickson skipped his senior year to play in the Canadian Football League (CFL). He majored in sociology and youth studies in college.

== Professional career ==
Hendrickson was selected by the Saskatchewan Roughriders in the second round, with the 15th overall pick, of the 1992 CFL draft. He dressed in 16 games, including one start at center and one at offensive guard, as a rookie in 1992. He also played on special teams. In 1993, Hendrickson was a starter on the offensive line with his brother Craig. Scott started all 18 games during the 1993 season as Saskatchewan went 11–7 and lost in the Western semifinal to the Edmonton Eskimos by a score of 51–13. He dressed in all 18 games for the second straight year in 1994, and was twice named the CFL lineman of the week. Saskatchewan finished the 1994 season 11—7 for the second consecutive year, and also lost in the Western semifinal for the second consecutive year. Hendrickson dressed in 17 games, all starts at guard, in 1995 as the Roughriders finished 6–12. He dressed in 15 games, missing three due to an ankle injury, in 1996 as the Roughriders went 5–13. Hendrickson dressed in 13 of 18 games in 1997. He lost his starting job after suffering another ankle injury. Saskatchewan finished the 1997 season with a losing record at 8–10 but ended up advancing to the 85th Grey Cup, where they lost to the Toronto Argonauts 47–23. He dressed in 97 games overall for the Roughriders from 1992 to 1997. He became a free agent after the 1997 season.

Hendrickson signed with the BC Lions of the CFL on March 3, 1998. Scott dressed in all 18 games for the Lions in 1998 as the team finished 9–9 and lost in the Western semifinal to the Eskimos. Hendrickson only dressed in two games in 1999 before suffering a season ending-knee injury. He reunited with his brother Craig on the Lions in 2000. Scott dressed in 12 games in 2000 before retiring in October to take a job with the Vancouver Fire and Rescue Services. He had previously attended fire college in Kentucky during the offseason.

Hendrickson finished his CFL career with 129 games dressed, nine defensive tackles, two special teams tackles, and one reception on one target for a one-yard touchdown.

== Personal life ==
Hendrickson's father, Lefty, played in the CFL as well. As of 2022, Scott was working as a firefighter.
