= Chris Morris (Canadian football) =

Canadian gridiron football coach (born 1968)

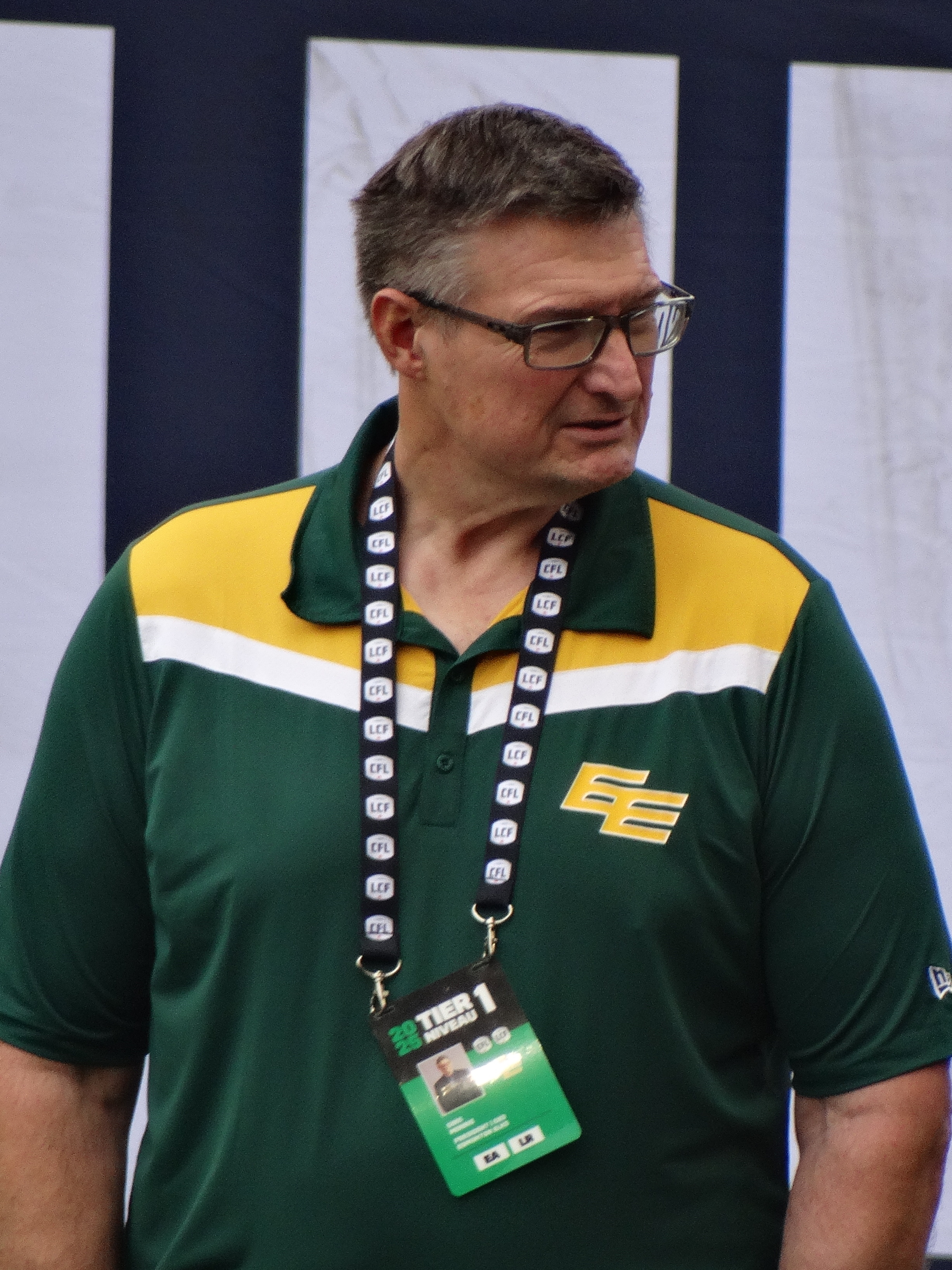
- Morris with the Edmonton Elks in 2025

Edmonton Elks
- Title: President/CEO
- CFL status: National

Personal information
- Born: September 13, 1968 (age 58); Scarborough, Ontario, Canada
- Listed height: 6 ft 5 in (1.96 m)
- Listed weight: 290 lb (132 kg)

Career information
- University: Toronto
- CFL draft: 1992: 1st round, 8th overall pick

Career history

Playing
- 1992–2005: Edmonton Eskimos

Coaching
- 2013–2024: Alberta Golden Bears (HC)

Operations
- 2024–present: Edmonton Elks (President/CEO)

Awards and highlights
- 3× Grey Cup champion (1993, 2003, 2005); Frank Tindall Trophy (2023); J. P. Metras Trophy (1990)

Career CFL statistics
- Games played: 237
- Stats at CFL.ca (archive)

Chris Morris (born September 13, 1968) is a Canadian former professional Canadian football offensive lineman who is the president and CEO for the Edmonton Elks of the Canadian Football League (CFL). He played for 14 seasons and 237 regular season games as a member of the Elks and is a three-time Grey Cup champion. He also served as head coach for the University of Alberta's football team, the Alberta Golden Bears, for 12 years.

== University career ==
Morris played CIAU football at the University of Toronto for the Varsity Blues.

== Professional career ==
Morris played in 237 games over fourteen seasons in the Canadian Football League for the Edmonton Eskimos from 1992 to 2005. He played in five Grey Cup games and was a part of three championship teams with the Eskimos.

== Coaching career ==
After spending time as a teacher, Morris was named head coach of the Alberta Golden Bears football team on December 4, 2012, taking over a team that had finished 0–8. In his second season, in 2014, the team finished with a 3–5 record, but it wasn't until 2017 that the team first qualified for the playoffs under Morris, which was a semi-final loss. The program made major strides in 2023 when the Golden Bears finished in second place with a 6–2 record and hosted a playoff game for the first time since 2005. That season, the team also won a playoff game for the first time since 2010, but Morris lost his first appearance in the Hardy Cup. Nonetheless, given the team's success that year, Morris was awarded the Frank Tindall Trophy as the U Sports football coach of the year in 2023. Following a disappointing 2024 season where the Golden Bears finished with a 2–6 season, Morris resigned as head coach to accept a position in the Canadian Football League.

== Executive career ==
On October 30, 2024, Morris was named president and CEO for the Edmonton Elks. His team won the 113th Grey Cup on November 15, 2026.
