= Denny Chronopoulos =

Canadian gridiron football player (1968–2000)

No. 53
- Position: Offensive guard

Personal information
- Born: June 12, 1968; Montreal, Quebec, Canada
- Died: August 27, 2000 (aged 32); Montreal, Quebec, Canada
- Listed height: 6 ft 4 in (1.93 m)
- Listed weight: 289 lb (131 kg)

Career information
- College: Purdue
- CFL draft: 1992: 1st round, 3rd overall pick

Career history
- 1992–1993: Ottawa Rough Riders
- 1994: BC Lions
- 1995–1996: Calgary Stampeders

Awards and highlights
- Grey Cup champion (1994); CFL East All-Star (1993)

Dennis Chronopoulos (June 12, 1968 – August 27, 2000) was a Canadian professional football offensive guard who played four seasons in the Canadian Football League (CFL) with the Ottawa Rough Riders, BC Lions and Calgary Stampeders. He was selected by the Rough Riders with the third overall pick of the 1992 CFL draft after playing college football at Purdue University.

== Early life ==
Dennis Chronopoulos was born on June 12, 1968, in Montreal. He was a two-year letterman for the Purdue Boilermakers of Purdue University from 1990 to 1991.

== Professional career ==
Chronopoulos was selected by the Ottawa Rough Riders of the CFL with the third pick in the 1992 CFL draft. He played in all 36 games during his tenure with the Rough Riders and was named a CFL East All-Star in 1993. He was traded to the BC Lions in June 1994 with Andrew Stewart and Angelo Snipes for Kent Warnock and BC's second-round pick in the 1995 CFL draft. Chronopoulos signed with the CFL's Calgary Stampeders in March 1995. He was released by the Stampeders in 1996 after failing a physical due to a heart murmur.

== Death ==
Chronopoulos died of a heart attack on August 27, 2000, in Montreal, Quebec.
