= 1983 Winnipeg Blue Bombers season =

Canadian football team season

- General manager: Cal Murphy
- Head coach: Cal Murphy
- Home stadium: Winnipeg Stadium

Results
- Record: 9–7
- Division place: 2nd, West
- Playoffs: Lost West Final

Uniform

The 1983 Winnipeg Blue Bombers finished in second place in the West Division with a 9–7 record. They appeared in the West Final but lost 39–21 to the BC Lions.

== Offseason ==
=== CFL draft ===
| Rd | Pick | Player | Position | School |

== Preseason ==
| Game | Date | Opponent | Results | | Venue | Attendance |
| Game | Date | Opponent | Score | Record | Venue | Attendance |
|---|---|---|---|---|---|---|
| A | Fri, June 10 | vs. Calgary Stampeders | L 4–26 | 0–1 | Winnipeg Stadium | 16,599 |
| B | Fri, June 17 | vs. BC Lions | L 23–24 | 0–2 | Winnipeg Stadium | 15,938 |
| C | Wed, June 22 | at Edmonton Eskimos | L 16–34 | 0–3 | Commonwealth Stadium | 38,951 |
| D | Sun, June 26 | at Saskatchewan Roughriders | L 10–33 | 0–4 | Taylor Field | 22,301 |

== Regular season ==
=== Standings ===
West Division
| Pos | Team | Pld | W | L | T | PF | PA | PD | Pts |
|---|---|---|---|---|---|---|---|---|---|
| 1 | BC Lions (C, Q) | 16 | 11 | 5 | 0 | 477 | 326 | +151 | 22 |
| 2 | Winnipeg Blue Bombers (Q) | 16 | 9 | 7 | 0 | 412 | 402 | +10 | 18 |
| 3 | Edmonton Eskimos (Q) | 16 | 8 | 8 | 0 | 450 | 377 | +73 | 16 |
| 4 | Calgary Stampeders | 16 | 8 | 8 | 0 | 425 | 378 | +47 | 16 |
| 5 | Saskatchewan Roughriders | 16 | 5 | 11 | 0 | 360 | 536 | −176 | 10 |

Source: "1983 Regular Season Standings". Archived from the original on 2008-08-08.
(C) First round bye; (Q) Qualified for playoffs

=== Schedule ===
| Week | Game | Date | Opponent | Results | | Venue | Attendance |
| Week | Game | Date | Opponent | Score | Record | Venue | Attendance |
|---|---|---|---|---|---|---|---|
| 1 | 1 | Fri, July 8 | vs. Ottawa Rough Riders | L 25–26 | 0–1 | Winnipeg Stadium | 18,995 |
| 2 | 2 | Fri, July 15 | at Edmonton Eskimos | W 20–18 | 1–1 | Commonwealth Stadium | 39,472 |
| 3 | 3 | Fri, July 22 | vs. Hamilton Tiger-Cats | W 29–18 | 2–1 | Winnipeg Stadium | 24,052 |
| 4 | Bye | | | | | | |
| 5 | 4 | Sun, Aug 7 | at Montreal Concordes | W 30–25 | 3–1 | Olympic Stadium | 20,774 |
| 6 | 5 | Sat, Aug 13 | vs. Toronto Argonauts | W 32–16 | 4–1 | Winnipeg Stadium | 27,796 |
| 7 | 6 | Sat, Aug 20 | at BC Lions | L 6–44 | 4–2 | BC Place | 56,852 |
| 8 | 7 | Sun, Aug 28 | vs. Calgary Stampeders | W 36–21 | 5–2 | Winnipeg Stadium | 23,032 |
| 9 | 8 | Sun, Sept 4 | at Saskatchewan Roughriders | L 30–32 | 5–3 | Taylor Field | 28,237 |
| 10 | 9 | Sat, Sept 10 | vs. Montreal Concordes | L 18–30 | 5–4 | Winnipeg Stadium | 21,189 |
| 11 | 10 | Fri, Sept 16 | at Calgary Stampeders | W 19–14 | 6–4 | McMahon Stadium | 26,198 |
| 12 | 11 | Sat, Sept 24 | vs. Saskatchewan Roughriders | W 50–19 | 7–4 | Winnipeg Stadium | 26,132 |
| 13 | 12 | Sat, Oct 1 | at Hamilton Tiger-Cats | W 34–19 | 8–4 | Ivor Wynne Stadium | 19,266 |
| 14 | 13 | Mon, Oct 10 | vs. BC Lions | L 18–30 | 8–5 | Winnipeg Stadium | 31,508 |
| 15 | 14 | Sun, Oct 16 | at Ottawa Rough Riders | L 23–42 | 8–6 | Lansdowne Park | 25,642 |
| 16 | 15 | Sun, Oct 23 | vs. Edmonton Eskimos | W 33–15 | 9–6 | Winnipeg Stadium | 24,206 |
| 17 | Bye | | | | | | |
| 18 | 16 | Sat, Nov 5 | at Toronto Argonauts | L 9–33 | 9–7 | Exhibition Stadium | 32,921 |

== Playoffs ==
=== West Semi-Final ===
| Team | Q1 | Q2 | Q3 | Q4 | Total |
|---|---|---|---|---|---|
| Edmonton Eskimos | 0 | 7 | 8 | 7 | 22 |
| Winnipeg Blue Bombers | 7 | 21 | 15 | 6 | 49 |

=== West Final ===
| Team | Q1 | Q2 | Q3 | Q4 | Total |
|---|---|---|---|---|---|
| Winnipeg Blue Bombers | 14 | 0 | 7 | 0 | 21 |
| BC Lions | 3 | 7 | 8 | 21 | 39 |

== Roster ==
1983 Winnipeg Blue Bombers final roster
| Quarterbacks: 2 Tom Clements; 7 Norman Gibbs; 12 John Hufnagel; Running backs: 33 Pat Cantner; 22 Rick Paulitsch; 30 Dan Huclack; 39 Sean Kehoe; 38 Willard Reaves; 10 James Sykes; Receivers: 70 Jeff Boyd; 29 Jerome Erdman; 31 Rick House; 21 James Murphy; 71 Joe Poplawski | Offensive linemen: 65 Nick Bastaja G/T; 59 Lyle Bauer G; 68 Val Belcher G; 43 John Bonk C; 56 Harold Jackmann G; 50 Mark Moors G/C; 61 Bobby Thompson T; 66 Pieter Vanden Bos G; 63 Chris Walby T; Defensive linemen: 64 Doug MacIver DT; 79 Stan Mikawos DT; 55 Tony Norman DE; 57 John Sturdivant DE; 51 Ray Sullivan DE | Linebackers: 58 Guy Boliaux; 52 Aaron Brown; 76 Ken Ciancone; 69 Tyrone Jones; 54 Vernon Pahl; 37 John Pointer; Defensive backs: 27 Paul Bennett; 23 Ernie Christmas; 14 Scott Flagel; 24 Ken Hailey; 8 Reggie Pierson; 20 Donovan Rose; 36 David Shaw; 28 Wylie Turner; 25 Kirby Wilson | Special teams: 6 Bob Cameron P; 3 Trevor Kennerd K; Injured list: 53 Pete Catan DE; Italics indicate American player |
