= 1983 Toronto Argonauts season =

CFL team season

- Head coach: Bob O'Billovich
- Home stadium: Exhibition Stadium

Results
- Record: 12–4
- Division place: 1st, East
- Playoffs: Won Grey Cup

Uniform

The 1983 Toronto Argonauts season was the 94th season for the team since the franchise's inception in 1873. The team finished in first place in the East Division with a 12–4 record and qualified for the playoffs for the second consecutive year. The Argonauts defeated the Hamilton Tiger-Cats in the Eastern Final and qualified for the Grey Cup for the second year in a row. Toronto defeated the BC Lions in the first ever Grey Cup match between the two teams, winning their 11th Grey Cup championship by a score of 18–17. The win ended a 31-year championship drought, which is the longest drought in Canadian Football League history.

During the regular season, receiver Terry Greer set a professional football record (NFL and CFL) for most receiving yards with 2003 yards. He also set a record for most 200-yard ball games in a year with three.

== Offseason ==
The Toronto Argonauts drafted the following players in the 1983 CFL draft.

Round	Pick	Player	Position	School
T	T	Kelvin Pruenster	T	Cal Poly
3	29	Kevin Adams	DB	Waterloo
4	35	Boyd Young	DL	Ottawa
5	44	Bryan Black	G	Guelph
6	53	Joel Tynes	TB	St. Francis Xavier
7	62	Dave Waud	LB	Wilfrid Laurier
8	71	Rick Van Maanen	DL	Western Ontario

== Preseason ==
Game	Date	Opponent	Results		Venue	Attendance
Game	Date	Opponent	Score	Record	Venue	Attendance
A	Fri, June 10	vs. Hamilton Tiger-Cats	W 24–6	1–0	Exhibition Stadium	28,520
B	Wed, June 15	at Hamilton Tiger-Cats	L 24–35	1–1	Ivor Wynne Stadium	11,505
C	Fri, June 24	vs. Rough Riders	W 31–15	2–1	Exhibition Stadium	28,107
D	Tue, June 28	at Montreal Concordes	W 25–24	3–1	Olympic Stadium	9,700

== Regular season ==
=== Standings ===
East Division
Pos	Team	Pld	W	L	T	PF	PA	PD	Pts	Div	Stk
1	Toronto Argonauts (C, Q)	16	12	4	0	452	328	124	24	4–2	W2
2	Ottawa Rough Riders (Q)	16	8	8	0	384	424	−40	16	2–4	L2
3	Hamilton Tiger-Cats (Q)	16	5	10	1	389	498	−109	11	3–2–1	T1
4	Montreal Concordes	16	5	10	1	367	447	−80	11	2–3–1	T1

Source: "1983 Regular Season Standings". Archived from the original on 2008-08-08.
(C) First round bye; (Q) Qualified for playoffs

=== Schedule ===
Week	Game	Date	Opponent	Results		Venue	Attendance
Week	Game	Date	Opponent	Score	Record	Venue	Attendance
1	1	Thu, July 7	at Calgary Stampeders	W 45–30	1–0	McMahon Stadium	25,124
2	2	Thu, July 14	vs. Lions	W 17–14	2–0	Exhibition Stadium	39,437
3	3	Sat, July 23	vs. Montreal Concordes	W 28–13	3–0	Exhibition Stadium	35,490
4	4	Fri, July 29	at Saskatchewan Roughriders	W 40–21	4–0	Taylor Field	25,734
5	5	Sat, Aug 6	vs. Hamilton Tiger-Cats	L 18–31	4–1	Exhibition Stadium	43,568
6	6	Sat, Aug 13	at Winnipeg Blue Bombers	L 16–32	4–2	Winnipeg Stadium	27,796
7	7	Fri, Aug 19	at Ottawa Rough Riders	W 27–17	5–2	Lansdowne Park	30,006
8	8	Fri, Aug 26	vs. Saskatchewan Roughriders	W 36–15	6–2	Exhibition Stadium	35,414
9	Bye						
10	9	Sat, Sept 10	at BC Lions	W 32–14	7–2	BC Place Stadium	52,656
11	10	Sun, Sept 18	at Hamilton Tiger-Cats	W 50–16	8–2	Ivor Wynne Stadium	25,128
12	11	Sat, Sept 24	vs. Calgary Stampeders	L 20–49	8–3	Exhibition Stadium	35,679
13	12	Sun, Oct 2	at Montreal Concordes	W 30–17	9–3	Olympic Stadium	20,046
14	13	Sun, Oct 9	vs. Edmonton Eskimos	W 19–15	10–3	Exhibition Stadium	37,746
15	Bye						
16	14	Sun, Oct 23	vs. Ottawa Rough Riders	L 19–20	10–4	Exhibition Stadium	36,526
17	15	Sat, Oct 29	at Edmonton Eskimos	W 22–15	11–4	Commonwealth Stadium	53,577
18	16	Sat, Nov 5	vs. Winnipeg Blue Bombers	W 33–9	12–4	Exhibition Stadium	32,921

== Postseason ==
Round	Date	Opponent	Results		Venue	Attendance
Round	Date	Opponent	Score	Record	Venue	Attendance
East Final	Sun, Nov 20	vs. Hamilton Tiger-Cats	W 41–36	1–0	Exhibition Stadium	54,530
Grey Cup	Sun, Nov 27	at BC Lions	W 18–17	2–0	BC Place Stadium	59,345

=== Grey Cup ===
November 27 @ BC Place Stadium (Attendance: 59,345)

Team	Q1	Q2	Q3	Q4	Total
BC Lions	7	10	0	0	17
Toronto Argonauts	0	7	2	9	18

== Roster ==
1983 Toronto Argonauts final roster
Quarterbacks: 15 Joe Adams; 17 Joe Barnes; 7 Condredge Holloway; Running backs: 27 Jan Carinci; 33 Rob Forbes; 20 Cedric Minter; Receivers: 28 Norm Brown; 10 Terry Greer; 29 Steve Hall; 71 Greg Holmes; 25 Paul Pearson; 19 Emanuel Tolbert; 30 Geoff Townsend	Offensive linemen: 54 Tony Antunovic G/C; 56 Ian Beckstead C/T; 69 Dan Ferrone G; 44 Mike Hameluck C; 63 John Malinosky T; 68 Bill Norton G; 66 Kelvin Pruenster T; 50 Tom Trifaux T; Defensive linemen: 75 Steve Del Col DE; 61 Franklin King DT; 77 Tony Lawson DE; 76 Rick Mohr DE; 79 Matthew Teague DE; 58 Earl Wilson DT	Linebackers: 35 Gord Elser; 39 William Mitchell; 36 Don Moen; 37 Ron Morehouse; 72 Darrell Nicholson; 31 John Palazeti FB; Defensive backs: 26 Steve Ackroyd; 2 Carl Brazley; 21 Marcellus Greene; 24 Ken McEachern; 18 Lamont Meacham; 4 Leroy Paul; 13 Darrell Wilson	Special teams: 8 Hank Ilesic K/P; Injured list: 34 Bob Bronk RB; Italics indicate International player

== Awards and honours ==
=== 1983 CFL All-Stars ===
- Terry Greer, Wide receiver
- Rick Mohr, Defensive end
- Carl Brazley, Defensive back

=== Canadian Football Hall of Fame ===
- Condredge Holloway, quarterback (1998)
- Dan Ferrone, guard (2013)
- Hank Ilesic, kicker/punter (2018)
- Terry Greer, wide receiver (2019)
