= Final 1983 CFL regular season game =

Saskatchewan Roughriders	Calgary Stampeders
(4–11)	(8–7)
27	23
Head coach: Reuben Berry	Head coach: Jack Gotta
	1	2	3	4	Total
Saskatchewan Roughriders	0	11	9	7	27
Calgary Stampeders	12	7	1	3	23
- Date: November 6, 1983
- Stadium: McMahon Stadium
- Location: Calgary, Alberta
- Referee: Bud Ulrich
- Attendance: 28,250

Broadcasters
- Network: CBC
- Announcers: Don Wittman; Leo Cahill; Ron Lancaster

The final 1983 Canadian Football League regular season game was played at McMahon Stadium in Calgary, Alberta on Sunday, November 6, 1983 between the Calgary Stampeders and the Saskatchewan Roughriders. Entering the game, the host Stampeders had an 8–7 record and needed only a tie to make the playoffs while the Roughriders had a 4–11 record and were eliminated from playoff contention. After trailing for most of the game, the Roughriders scored a touchdown off of a turnover with only 27 seconds remaining and upset the Stampeders by a final score of 27–23.

The loss caused the Stampeders to miss the playoffs as their provincial archrivals and five-time defending Grey Cup champion Edmonton Eskimos, who had already finished 8–8 and would have missed the playoffs with a Calgary win or tie, held the decisive tiebreaker over the Stampeders by a narrow margin. The closing minutes of the game in particular remain one of the best examples of an already-eliminated team aggressively and successfully playing the role of spoiler in major professional sports in the United States and Canada.

== Background ==
=== Five-time defending champions on the brink ===
Led by superstar African-American quarterback Warren Moon, the Edmonton Eskimos had dominated the Canadian Football League with five consecutive Grey Cup titles from 1978 through 1982 inclusive, and as of 2025 are the most recent team in any of the six most prominent major professional sports leagues in the United States and Canada to accomplish such a feat. However, they struggled to replicate that success in 1983 and became the first such five-time defending champion in any of the then-five most prominent North American major sports leagues to fail to record a winning record. Having already finished the regular season at 8–8, the Eskimos had a bye for the final week.

Since the few years prior to formal founding of the Canadian Football League, the top three teams in each section of what became the CFL in 1958 have qualified for the playoffs. Thus, a .500 record is typically good enough to qualify for the CFL postseason. However, the season structure was changed in the 1981 CFL season so that each of the nine teams had played home and away against each opponent regardless of division, nevertheless in spite of the balanced interlocking schedule the playoff format remained unchanged with the top three teams in each division unconditionally making the playoffs regardless of records in the opposite division. Moreover, the five-team West Division had become significantly more competitive than the four-team East Division, in particular during the Eskimos' dynasty. Thus, even though a .500 record was much better than the 5–10 records Hamilton Tiger-Cats and Montreal Concordes had going into the final week of the season, this had no bearing on playoff qualification in the West. Pending the result of the final week's Calgary-Saskatchewan game, Edmonton's 8–8 record was only good enough for fourth place in their division.

=== Calgary Stampeders ===
The Calgary Stampeders, who were coached by Jack Gotta, had compiled an 8–7 record going into their final game. With a win, they would have equalled the Winnipeg Blue Bombers' 9–7 record although Calgary would have still finished third as Winnipeg swept their regular season series. Against Edmonton, Calgary split their regular season series against Edmonton, moreover, both teams won by three points. The third tiebreaker was intradivisional records, but the two Albertan teams were set to be tied in that criterion as well with a Calgary loss since each team had won only three games (including their wins versus each other) against Western opponents. In the next tiebreaker, points-for-and-against ratio in intradivisional games, Edmonton crucially held the tie-breaker over Calgary by a slim margin. Thus, Calgary stood to finish third and make the playoffs (and dethrone their archrivals) with a win or tie, but would miss the playoffs with a loss by any margin.

=== Saskatchewan Roughriders ===
At 4–11, the Saskatchewan Roughriders were already eliminated from playoff contention. The team was in the midst of an eleven-season playoff drought that would last from their 1976 Grey Cup loss until 1988. Head coach Joe Faragalli was fired after a 1–5 start and replaced by assistant Reuben Berry on an interim basis. The team was therefore playing for pride, but in particular for Berry the result had the potential to determine if he would be returning to coach next season.

== Game summary ==
The game was the last of four scheduled CFL games to be played in the final week of the regular season. As it kicked off, the Concordes and Tiger-Cats were playing at Montreal's Olympic Stadium in the fourth quarter in what was effectively an East Division quarter-final game. Because Hamilton had beaten Montreal earlier in the season at Ivor Wynne Stadium, it was the Tiger-Cats who stood to advance to the playoffs in case of a tie. Trailing 21–18 late in the game, Hamilton kicked a field goal and held on for the tie and a playoff berth.

=== First quarter ===
With the wind at the Stampeders' backs for the opening quarter, Calgary punter Mike McTague opened the scoring with a single. Stampeders quarterback Bernard Quarles later engineered an 84-yard drive culminating in a five-yard touchdown pass to Waymon Alridge. Calgary extended their lead with a 41-yard field goal by J.T. Hay. McTague punted for another single at the end of the quarter to extend the lead to 12–0.

=== Second quarter ===
Quarterback Homer Jordan got the Roughriders onto the scoreboard with a twelve-yard run. After converting, Saskatchewan kicker Dave Ridgway further cut the deficit to four when his ensuing kickoff rolled into the end zone for a single, then to one with a 43-yard field goal late in the half. Calgary promptly responded with a 75-yard drive ending in a five-yard touchdown run by Quarles to extend the lead back to 19–11.

=== Third quarter ===
After Ridgway opened the second half with another single on the opening kickoff, the Stampeders' opening drive ended in a 44-yard field goal attempt into the wind by Hay which had sufficient distance but missed – the Roughriders conceded a single to restore Calgary's eight-point lead. During the next Saskatchewan possession, Ridgway came onto the field twice but never attempted a field goal, the first time because an offside penalty gave the Roughriders a fresh set of downs and second time because the attempt was a fake which drew a pass interference penalty in the end zone. The ensuing one-yard rush by John Park capped a 73-yard drive that cut Saskatchewan's deficit to one. Ridgway later did attempt a 43-yard field goal late in the quarter, which missed but counted for a single to tie the game 20–20.

=== Three more Calgary singles ===
With the wind back behind them for the final period, the Stampeders defence kept Saskatchewan off the board for most of the fourth quarter however their offence continued to struggle. Hay missed another field goal from 39 yards, although it counted for a single. McTague extended the lead to two points with a 63-yard punt. A 78-yard punt by McTague, aided by a highly favourable bounce on the hard artificial turf, rolled through the end zone to extend the lead to three points with 2:45 remaining in the final quarter.

=== A crucial turnover ===
Calgary stopped the ensuing Saskatchewan drive and took over near midfield following a short punt. Following a two-and-out, the ensuing snap to McTague bounced off the turf. McTague had successfully recovered a high bad snap earlier in the quarter, but this time was unable to punt the ball before being tackled. Replays showed it to be highly doubtful whether McTague ever secured the ball, which was picked up by the Roughriders' Rusty Olsen and run into the end zone. However, in what initially seemed to be a fortunate break for the Stampeders, the ball was ruled dead at the 43-yard line, resulting in a turnover on downs with 1:25 remaining.

=== The winning drive ===
Jordan managed to run for a first down, but then lost most of the yards gained when he was sacked on the next play. He completed a pass on the next play to set up a third-and-eleven at the 32-yard line. Although the Roughriders were facing the wind, this was easily within the field goal range of Ridgway – later in his career, the Saskatchewan kicker would break the CFL record for field goal distance.

Under present-day rules in all competitions of gridiron football, regardless of playoff implications a team trailing by exactly three points in field goal range needing to gain eleven yards on the next play to avoid a turnover on downs will almost certainly attempt a field goal in an effort to force overtime. However, the CFL did not introduce overtime in the regular season until 1986. With only 55 seconds remaining, even under CFL timekeeping rules Saskatchewan would have had little chance of regaining possession following a successful field goal, let alone with enough time to gain the necessary yards to attempt a game-winning score. Thus, in contrast to the Tiger-Cats who had successfully kicked a field goal to secure a tie just hours earlier, Berry was unwilling to appear as if he was simply gifting the Stampeders a playoff berth and instead elected to gamble on third-and-long.

Jordan's third down pass to Stew Fraser was successful, giving Saskatchewan a fresh set of downs near the 15-yard line. His next pass attempt to Chris DeFrance was somewhat wayward, but DeFrance made a spectacular reception to set up second-and-one at the six-yard line. Jordan then rushed to set up a first-and-goal. A pass attempt into the end zone was incomplete, however a Calgary penalty for holding allowed Saskatchewan to repeat first down at half the distance to the goal. Mike Washington ran for the touchdown on the next play to put Saskatchewan ahead 27–23 with 27 seconds remaining.

=== Conclusion ===
The officials' decision that denied a touchdown to Olsen thus worked to Calgary's detriment as it allowed Saskatchewan to run almost a minute off the clock on their touchdown drive. Following the kickoff, Quarles managed to complete one pass to advance the ball to the Saskatchewan 40-yard line with six seconds remaining, but was sacked on the following play as time expired to end the game and both teams' seasons.

== Aftermath ==
Ultimately, the upset provided only a one week reprieve for the Eskimos and their dynasty as they were dethroned as CFL champions with a 49–22 blowout loss to the Blue Bombers in the Western Semi-Final.

Gotta was fired after the loss. While Berry returned to coach the Roughriders in 1984, he too was fired after the team once again failed to make the playoffs with a 6–9–1 record. In an ironic twist of fate, the Roughriders hired Gotta to replace Berry.

== See also ==
- Spoiler (sports)
- 1983 CFL season
- 1983 Calgary Stampeders season
- 1983 Saskatchewan Roughriders season
- 1983 Edmonton Eskimos season
