= 1983 Montreal Concordes season =

- Owner: Charles Bronfman
- Head coach: Joe Galat
- Home stadium: Olympic Stadium

Results
- Record: 5–10–1
- Division place: 4th, East
- Playoffs: Did not qualify

The 1983 Montreal Concordes finished the season in fourth place in the East Division with a 5–10–1 record and missed the playoffs.

== Preseason ==
Game	Date	Opponent	Results		Venue	Attendance
Game	Date	Opponent	Score	Record	Venue	Attendance
A	June 10	vs. Ottawa Rough Riders	W 14–4	1–0	Olympic Stadium	10,100
B	June 16	at Ottawa Rough Riders	W 34–13	2–0	Lansdowne Park	12,803
C	June 22	at Hamilton Tiger-Cats	L 13–26	2–1	Ivor Wynne Stadium	11,250
D	July 28	vs. Toronto Argonauts	L 13–31	2–2	Olympic Stadium	9,700

== Regular season ==
=== Standings ===
East Division
Pos	Team	Pld	W	L	T	PF	PA	PD	Pts	Div	Stk
1	Toronto Argonauts (C, Q)	16	12	4	0	452	328	124	24	4–2	W2
2	Ottawa Rough Riders (Q)	16	8	8	0	384	424	−40	16	2–4	L2
3	Hamilton Tiger-Cats (Q)	16	5	10	1	389	498	−109	11	3–2–1	T1
4	Montreal Concordes	16	5	10	1	367	447	−80	11	2–3–1	T1

Source: "1983 Regular Season Standings". Archived from the original on 2008-08-08.
(C) First round bye; (Q) Qualified for playoffs

=== Schedule ===
Week	Game	Date	Opponent	Results		Venue	Attendance
Week	Game	Date	Opponent	Score	Record	Venue	Attendance
1	1	July 7	vs. Saskatchewan Roughriders	L 14–21	0–1	Olympic Stadium	26,643
2	2	July 16	vs. Ottawa Rough Riders	W 36–28	1–1	Olympic Stadium	15,621
3	3	July 23	vs. Toronto Argonauts	L 13–28	1–2	Exhibition Stadium	35,490
4	4	July 31	at Calgary Stampeders	L 10–42	1–3	McMahon Stadium	22,665
5	5	Aug 7	vs. Winnipeg Blue Bombers	L 25–30	1–4	Olympic Stadium	20,774
6	Bye						
7	6	Aug 20	vs. Edmonton Eskimos	L 15–28	1–5	Olympic Stadium	20,126
8	7	Aug 27	vs. BC Lions	L 6–28	1–6	BC Place Stadium	36,743
9	8	Sept 5	at Hamilton Tiger-Cats	L 30–35	1–7	Ivor Wynne Stadium	18,547
10	9	Sept 10	at Winnipeg Blue Bombers	W 30–18	2–7	Winnipeg Stadium	21,189
11	10	Sept 17	vs. BC Lions	L 26–42	2–8	Olympic Stadium	17,161
12	Bye						
13	11	Oct 2	vs. Toronto Argonauts	L 17–30	2–9	Olympic Stadium	20,046
14	12	Oct 9	at Saskatchewan Roughriders	W 40–23	3–9	Taylor Field	23,498
15	13	Oct 15	at Edmonton Eskimos	L 32–45	3–10	Commonwealth Stadium	49,074
16	14	Oct 22	vs. Calgary Stampeders	W 27–8	4–10	Olympic Stadium	27,573
17	15	Oct 29	at Ottawa Rough Riders	W 25–20	5–10	Lansdowne Park	20,959
18	16	Nov 6	vs. Hamilton Tiger-Cats	T 21–21	5–10–1	Olympic Stadium	41,157

== Roster ==
1983 Montreal Concordes final roster
**Quarterbacks**: 3 Mike Calhoun; 19 Johnny Evans; 10 Kevin Starkey; **Running backs**: 22 Lester Brown; 34 Denny Ferdinand; 33 Chuck McMann; **Wide receivers**: 89 Todd Brown; 2 Brian DeRoo; 15 Jeff Patterson; 8 Ron Robinson; 32 Mike Washburn; **Tight ends**: 79 Nick Arakgi	**Offensive linemen**: 66 Lloyd Fairbanks T; 65 Miles Gorrell T; 58 Glenn Keeble G/C; 50 Roland Mangold G; 60 Blake Nill T; 53 Doug Smith G; 54 Rob Smith G; **Defensive linemen**: 67 Gene Belliveau DT; 69 Bob Briggs DE; 64 Glen Weir DT; 75 Lyall Woznesensky DE; 55 James Zachery DE; **Special teams**: 7 Gerry McGrath P/K; 11 Don Sweet K/P; **Injured list**: 70 Doug Scott DE	**Linebackers**: 41 Tony Anglin; 42 Zac Cypert; 52 Delbert Fowler; 72 Kurt Garl; 62 Bill Hampton; 77 Mark Hopkins; 51 Frank Kosec; 47 George Martin; **Defensive backs**: 1 Andre Francis; 6 Phil Jones; 27 Pete Lavorato; 25 Terry Lehne; 18 Vince Phason; 26 Harry Skipper; 12 Ed Slabikowski; 36 Joe Walker; 17 Preston Young; Italics indicate American players **Bold** indicates Global player
