= 1983 Ottawa Rough Riders season =

Canadian football team season

- Head coach: George Brancato
- Home stadium: Lansdowne Park

Results
- Record: 8–8
- Division place: 2nd, East
- Playoffs: Lost in East Semi-Final

Uniform

The 1983 Ottawa Rough Riders finished the season in second place in the East Division with an 8–8 record. This season marked the last time an Ottawa football team hosted a playoff game until 2015 when the second-year Ottawa Redblacks hosted the East Final, where the Rough Riders lost the East-Semi Final game to Hamilton by a score of 33–31.

== Offseason ==
=== CFL draft ===
| Rd | Pick | Player | Position | School |
|---|---|---|---|---|
| 1 | 2 | Steve Harrison | LB | British Columbia |
| 2 | 11 | Junior Robinson | DB | Guelph |
| 3 | 20 | Sam Benincasa | LB | Guelph |
| 4 | 29 | John Kane | OL | Michigan Tech |
| 5 | 38 | Courtney Taylor | DB | Wilfrid Laurier |
| 6 | 47 | Francois Payer | DE | Bishop's |
| 7 | 56 | Chris Rhora | DE | Acadia |
| 8 | 65 | Don Clow | WR | Acadia |

=== Preseason ===
| Game | Date | Opponent | Results | | Venue | Attendance |
| Game | Date | Opponent | Score | Record | Venue | Attendance |
|---|---|---|---|---|---|---|
| A | June 10 | at Montreal Concordes | L 4–14 | 0–1 | | 10,100 |
| B | June 16 | vs. Montreal Concordes | L 13–34 | 0–2 | | 12,803 |
| C | June 24 | at Toronto Argonauts | L 15–31 | 0–3 | | 28,107 |
| D | June 29 | vs. Hamilton Tiger-Cats | W 47–40 | 1–3 | | 13,331 |

== Regular season ==
=== Standings ===
East Division
| Pos | Team | Pld | W | L | T | PF | PA | PD | Pts | Div | Stk |
|---|---|---|---|---|---|---|---|---|---|---|---|
| 1 | Toronto Argonauts (C, Q) | 16 | 12 | 4 | 0 | 452 | 328 | 124 | 24 | 4–2 | W2 |
| 2 | Ottawa Rough Riders (Q) | 16 | 8 | 8 | 0 | 384 | 424 | −40 | 16 | 2–4 | L2 |
| 3 | Hamilton Tiger-Cats (Q) | 16 | 5 | 10 | 1 | 389 | 498 | −109 | 11 | 3–2–1 | T1 |
| 4 | Montreal Concordes | 16 | 5 | 10 | 1 | 367 | 447 | −80 | 11 | 2–3–1 | T1 |

Source: "1983 Regular Season Standings". Archived from the original on 2008-08-08.
(C) First round bye; (Q) Qualified for playoffs

=== Schedule ===
| Week | Game | Date | Opponent | Results | | Venue | Attendance |
| Week | Game | Date | Opponent | Score | Record | Venue | Attendance |
|---|---|---|---|---|---|---|---|
| 1 | 1 | July 8 | at Winnipeg Blue Bombers | W 26–25 | 1–0 | | 18,995 |
| 2 | 2 | July 16 | at Montreal Concordes | L 28–36 | 1–1 | | 15,621 |
| 3 | 3 | July 21 | vs. Calgary Stampeders | L 16–27 | 1–2 | | 18,621 |
| 4 | 4 | July 28 | vs. Edmonton Eskimos | L 4–44 | 1–3 | | 18,622 |
| 5 | Bye | | | | | | |
| 6 | 5 | Aug 13 | at Hamilton Tiger-Cats | L 22–24 | 1–4 | | 14,729 |
| 7 | 6 | Aug 19 | vs. Toronto Argonauts | L 17–27 | 1–5 | | 30,006 |
| 8 | 7 | Aug 26 | at Edmonton Eskimos | W 17–14 | 2–5 | | 49,880 |
| 9 | 8 | Sept 2 | vs. BC Lions | W 49–19 | 3–5 | | 22,234 |
| 10 | 9 | Sept 9 | vs. Saskatchewan Roughriders | L 28–29 | 3–6 | | 23,475 |
| 11 | Bye | | | | | | |
| 12 | 10 | Sept 25 | vs. Hamilton Tiger-Cats | W 29–25 | 4–6 | | 26,014 |
| 13 | 11 | Oct 1 | at Saskatchewan Roughriders | W 24–23 | 5–6 | | 24,404 |
| 14 | 12 | Oct 8 | at Calgary Stampeders | W 29–24 | 6–6 | | 24,167 |
| 15 | 13 | Oct 16 | vs. Winnipeg Blue Bombers | W 42–23 | 7–6 | | 25,642 |
| 16 | 14 | Oct 23 | at Toronto Argonauts | W 20–19 | 8–6 | | 36,526 |
| 17 | 15 | Oct 29 | vs. Montreal Concordes | L 20–25 | 8–7 | | 20,959 |
| 18 | 16 | Nov 5 | at BC Lions | L 13–40 | 8–8 | | 42,901 |

== Postseason ==
| Game | Date | Opponent | Results | | Venue | Attendance |
| Game | Date | Opponent | Score | Record | Venue | Attendance |
|---|---|---|---|---|---|---|
| East Semi-Final | Nov 13 | vs. Hamilton Tiger-Cats | L 31–33 | 0–1 | | 28,524 |

== Roster ==
1983 Ottawa Rough Riders final roster
| Quarterbacks: 16 Chris Isaac; 4 Prince McJunkins; 6 J. C. Watts; Running backs: 39 Maurice Doyle; 32 Jim Reid; 33 Skip Walker; Wide receivers: 8 Phil Charron; 31 Mike Collymore; 5 Mariet Ford; 21 Ty Gray; 19 Dave Newman; 3 Carl Powell; 14 Pat Stoqua; Tight ends: 23 Mike Hudson | Offensive linemen: 65 Roger Cattelan T; 52 Kevin Dalliday T; 64 Tim Hook G; 67 Rudy Phillips G; 50 Kevin Powell T; 56 Bob Stephen C/G; 55 Larry Tittley C; Defensive linemen: 69 Gary Dulin DT; 78 Ron Engleson DT; 63 Randy Fournier DE; 66 Greg Marshall DE; 74 Mark Seale DT; 61 Doug Seymour DE; 59 Jack Williams DE | Linebackers: 42 Mike Graffi; 34 Steve Harrison; 75 Rick Sowieta; 17 Al Washington; Defensive backs: 25 Ricky Barden; 22 Charles Cornelius; 27 Ivory Curry; 38 Charles Johnson; 29 John Lynch; 7 Ken Miller; 28 Junior Robinson; Special teams: 13 Ken Clark P; 71 Gerry Organ K/P; Injured list: 3 Kelvin Kirk WR; 1 Bruce Walker WR; Italics indicate International player |

== Awards and honours ==
=== CFL awards ===
- CFL's Most Outstanding Defensive Player Award – Greg Marshall (DE)
- CFL's Most Outstanding Offensive Lineman Award – Rudy Phillips (OG)

=== CFL All-Stars ===
- RB – Alvin "Skip" Walker
- OG – Rudy Phillips
- OT – Kevin Powell
- DT – Gary Dulin
- DE – Greg Marshall
