= 1983 BC Lions season =

Canadian football team season

- General manager: Bob Ackles
- Head coach: Don Matthews
- Home stadium: BC Place Stadium

Results
- Record: 11–5
- Division place: 1st, West
- Playoffs: Lost Grey Cup

The 1983 BC Lions finished in first place in the West Division with an 11–5 record. They appeared in the Grey Cup but lost to the Toronto Argonauts.

This season marks the Lions' first at the new BC Place Stadium in downtown Vancouver, which to this day remains their home field.

== Offseason ==
=== CFL draft ===
Round	Pick	Player	Position	School
T	T	Jim Mills	Offensive tackle	Hawaii
1	8	Jamie Buis	Tackle	Simon Fraser
2	14	Kevin Lapa	Linebacker	Weber State
2	17	Peter LeClaire	Fullback	UBC
3	23	William Bickowski	Fullback	Wilfrid Laurier
4	32	Jerome Erdman	Wide receiver	Simon Fraser
5	41	Harold Jackman	Tackle	Moorhead State
6	50	Kyle Barrow	Linebacker	Western Ontario
7	59	Mike Brown	Defensive back	Toronto
8	68	Ken Munroe	Wide receiver	UBC

== Preseason ==
Game	Date	Opponent	Results		Venue	Attendance
Game	Date	Opponent	Score	Record	Venue	Attendance
A	Fri, June 10	at Edmonton Eskimos	W 52–20	1–0	Commonwealth Stadium	42,196
B	Fri, June 17	at Winnipeg Blue Bombers	W 24–23	2–0	Winnipeg Stadium	15,938
C	Thu, June 23	vs. Calgary Stampeders	W 41–19	3–0	BC Place	53,472
D	Thu, June 30	vs. Saskatchewan Roughriders	W 37–26	4–0	BC Place	30,984

== Regular season ==
=== Season standings ===
West Division
Pos	Team	Pld	W	L	T	PF	PA	PD	Pts
1	BC Lions (C, Q)	16	11	5	0	477	326	+151	22
2	Winnipeg Blue Bombers (Q)	16	9	7	0	412	402	+10	18
3	Edmonton Eskimos (Q)	16	8	8	0	450	377	+73	16
4	Calgary Stampeders	16	8	8	0	425	378	+47	16
5	Saskatchewan Roughriders	16	5	11	0	360	536	−176	10

Source: "1983 Regular Season Standings". Archived from the original on 2008-08-08.
(C) First round bye; (Q) Qualified for playoffs

=== Season schedule ===
Week	Game	Date	Opponent	Results		Venue	Attendance
Week	Game	Date	Opponent	Score	Record	Venue	Attendance
1	Bye						
2	1	Thu, July 14	at Toronto Argonauts	L 14–17	0–1	Exhibition Stadium	39,437
3	2	Sun, July 24	vs. Saskatchewan Roughriders	W 44–28	1–1	BC Place	41,801
4	3	Sat, July 30	at Hamilton Tiger-Cats	W 34–28	2–1	Ivor Wynne Stadium	16,101
5	4	Sun, Aug 7	vs. Calgary Stampeders	W 32–16	3–1	BC Place	37,496
6	5	Fri, Aug 12	at Edmonton Eskimos	W 43–13	4–1	Commonwealth Stadium	52,765
7	6	Sat, Aug 20	vs. Winnipeg Blue Bombers	W 44–6	5–1	BC Place	56,852
8	7	Sat, Aug 27	vs. Montreal Concordes	W 28–6	6–1	BC Place	36,743
9	8	Fri, Sept 2	at Ottawa Rough Riders	L 19–49	6–2	Lansdowne Park	22,234
10	9	Sat, Sept 10	vs. Toronto Argonauts	L 14–32	6–3	BC Place	52,656
11	10	Sat, Sept 17	at Montreal Concordes	W 42–26	7–3	Olympic Stadium	17,161
12	11	Sun, Sept 25	vs. Edmonton Eskimos	W 31–30	8–3	BC Place	52,430
13	Bye						
14	12	Mon, Oct 10	at Winnipeg Blue Bombers	W 30–18	9–3	Winnipeg Stadium	31,508
15	13	Sun, Oct 16	at Calgary Stampeders	L 16–25	9–4	McMahon Stadium	24,013
16	14	Sat, Oct 22	vs. Hamilton Tiger-Cats	W 41–16	10–4	BC Place	43,513
17	15	Sun, Oct 30	at Saskatchewan Roughriders	L 5–11	10–5	Taylor Field	23,471
18	16	Sat, Nov 5	vs. Ottawa Rough Riders	W 40–13	11–5	BC Place	42,901

== Roster ==
1983 BC Lions final roster
Quarterbacks: 14 Tim Cowan; 9 Roy Dewalt; 6 Joe Paopao; Running backs: 23 Larry Jones; 33 Ryan Potter; 34 Ray Strong; 19 Don Taylor; 20 John Henry White; Wide receivers: 8 Ned Armour; 72 Gerald Bradley; 71 Jacques Chapdelaine; 24 Mervyn Fernandez; 21 John Pankratz; Tight ends: 3 Mark Debrueys	Offensive linemen: 68 John Blain T; 69 Jamie Buis C/T; 67 Dennis Guevin T; 54 Glenn Leonhard G; 51 Warner Miles G/T; 65 Gerald Roper G; 63 Don Swafford T; 52 Al Wilson C; Defensive linemen: 66 Ron Cherkas DE; 58 Nick Hebeler DE; 60 Rick Klassen DT; 78 Mack Moore DT; 74 Brent Racette DE; 79 Ruben Vaughan DT	Linebackers: 50 Tyrone Crews; 7 Bernie Glier; 37 Glen Jackson; 31 Kevin Konar; 45 Dave McNeel; Defensive backs: 10 Melvin Byrd; 28 Larry Crawford; 26 Jo Jo Heath; 32 Andre Jones; 11 Joe Kuklo; 4 Nelson Martin; 16 Billy McBride; 17 Kerry Parker; Special teams: 5 Lui Passaglia K/P; Italics indicate American player

== Awards and records ==
- Rick Klassen: Dick Suderman Trophy

=== 1983 CFL All-Stars ===
- OT – John Blain, CFL All-Star
- P/K – Lui Passaglia, CFL All-Star
- DT – Mack Moore, CFL All-Star
- DB – Kerry Parker, CFL All-Star
- DB – Larry Crawford, CFL All-Star

== Playoffs ==
=== West Final ===
Team	Q1	Q2	Q3	Q4	Total
Winnipeg Blue Bombers	14	0	7	0	21
BC Lions	3	7	8	21	39

=== Grey Cup ===
Team	Q1	Q2	Q3	Q4	Total
Toronto Argonauts	7	0	2	9	18
BC Lions	7	10	0	0	17
