= 1983 Calgary Stampeders season =

Canadian football team season

- General manager: Jack Gotta
- Head coach: Jack Gotta
- Home stadium: McMahon Stadium

Results
- Record: 8–8
- Division place: 4th, West
- Playoffs: did not qualify

The 1983 Calgary Stampeders season was the 39th season for the Canadian Football League club. They finished in fourth place in the West Division with an 8–8 record and failed to make the playoffs.

== Regular season ==
The Stampeders' 1983 season is best remembered for an upset loss at home completed in the last three minutes of the campaign that not only kept them out of the playoffs, but deprived Calgary of an opportunity to dethrone their bitter archrivals who were the five-time defending Grey Cup champions.

Calgary entered the final week of the season with an 8-7 record and were in third place in the West. The Edmonton Eskimos, despite being five-time defending champions, had struggled to an 8-8 record and were idle in the final week. With the cross-over rule not yet in effect, the Eskimos could thus only watch helplessly as their provincial rivals hosted the long-eliminated 4-11 Saskatchewan Roughriders needing only a tie to end Edmonton's season. Crucially however, Edmonton held any potential tiebreaker over Calgary on account of a slim advantage in points-for-and-against ratio in divisional games, thus ensuring Calgary would miss the playoffs with a loss by any margin.

Calgary stormed to an early 12-0 lead in the first quarter, but Saskatchewan came back and eventually tied the game 20-20 by the end of the third quarter. In the fourth quarter, the Stampeders scored three consecutive singles, the last of these coming with just 2:45 left on the clock. Since no overtime format was yet in force for the CFL regular season, Calgary at that point only needed to hold Saskatchewan to a field goal to reach the postseason. On their next possession however, the Stampeders turned the ball over on their own 43-yard line when a third-down snap bounced off the turf and was fumbled by punter Mike McTague. On their ensuing drive, which crucially included a successful third-and-eleven conversion from well within the field goal range of Saskatchewan kicker Dave Ridgway, the Roughriders scored a touchdown with 27 seconds remaining in the game. They then held off a final desperate Calgary drive to shock the Stampeders and their fans, 27-23, thus ending Calgary's season.

Ultimately however, the Stampeders' miscue extended their rivals' dynasty by only one week as the Eskimos were throttled 49-22 by the Winnipeg Blue Bombers in the Western Semi-Final.

=== Season standings ===
West Division
Pos	Team	Pld	W	L	T	PF	PA	PD	Pts
1	BC Lions (C, Q)	16	11	5	0	477	326	+151	22
2	Winnipeg Blue Bombers (Q)	16	9	7	0	412	402	+10	18
3	Edmonton Eskimos (Q)	16	8	8	0	450	377	+73	16
4	Calgary Stampeders	16	8	8	0	425	378	+47	16
5	Saskatchewan Roughriders	16	5	11	0	360	536	−176	10

Source: "1983 Regular Season Standings". Archived from the original on 2008-08-08.
(C) First round bye; (Q) Qualified for playoffs

=== Season schedule ===
Week	Game	Date	Opponent	Results		Venue	Attendance
Week	Game	Date	Opponent	Score	Record	Venue	Attendance
	1	Thu, July 7	vs. Toronto Argonauts	L 30–45	0–1	McMahon Stadium	25,124
	2	Thu, July 21	at Ottawa Rough Riders	W 27–13	1–1	Lansdowne Park	18,621
	3	Sun, July 31	vs. Montreal Concordes	W 42–10	2–1	McMahon Stadium	22,665
	4	Sun, Aug 7	at BC Lions	L 16–32	2–2	BC Place	37,496
	5	Sun, Aug 14	at Saskatchewan Roughriders	W 36–28	3–2	Taylor Field	25.533
	6	Sun, Aug 21	vs. Hamilton Tiger-Cats	W 26–15	4–2	McMahon Stadium	24,565
	7	Sun, Aug 28	at Winnipeg Blue Bombers	L 21–36	4–3	Winnipeg Stadium	23,032
	8	Mon, Sept 5	vs. Edmonton Eskimos	W 18–15	5–3	McMahon Stadium	30,481
	9	Fri, Sept 16	vs. Winnipeg Blue Bombers	L 14–19	5–4	McMahon Stadium	26,198
	10	Sat, Sept 24	at Toronto Argonauts	W 49–20	6–4	Exhibition Stadium	35,679
	11	Sun, Oct 2	at Edmonton Eskimos	L 28–31	6–5	Commonwealth Stadium	52,255
	12	Sat, Oct 8	vs. Ottawa Rough Riders	L 24–29	6–6	McMahon Stadium	24,167
	13	Sun, Oct 16	vs. BC Lions	W 25–16	7–6	McMahon Stadium	24,013
	14	Sat, Oct 22	at Montreal Concordes	L 8–27	7–7	Olympic Stadium	27,573
	15	Sun, Oct 31	at Hamilton Tiger-Cats	W 35–12	8–7	Ivor Wynne Stadium	14,010
	16	Sun, Nov 6	vs. Saskatchewan Roughriders	L 23–27	8–8	McMahon Stadium	28,250

== Roster ==
1983 Calgary Stampeders final roster
Quarterbacks: 8 Danny Barrett; 6 Gerry Dattilio; 14 Bernard Quarles; Running backs: 24 Ray Crouse; 19 Craig Ellis; Wide receivers: 26 Waymon Alridge; 18 Willie Armstead; 22 Tom Forzani; 21 Mike Levenseller; 9 Mike McTague P; 75 Bill Mintsoulis; 35 Vic Wallace; Tight ends: 70 Ken Moore	Offensive linemen: 65 Jerry Dobrovolny T; 51 Jeff Inglis T; 69 Dave Kirzinger G; 59 Bob Lubig G/T; 56 Ted Milian C; 68 Kevin Molle T; 61 Willie Thomas G/C; Defensive linemen: 57 Walter Ballard DE/DT; 53 Harry Doering DE; 63 Rick Goltz DT; 89 Scott MacArthur DE; 64 Ed McAleney DT; 62 Randy Trautman DT; 66 Steve Wilburn DE	Linebackers: 30 Danny Bass; 25 Doug Battershill; 72 Bernie Morrison; 82 Mark Nelson; 58 James West; 47 Andre Young; Defensive backs: 27 Richie Hall; 44 Larry Hogue; 46 Ron Hopkins; 7 Lepoleon Ingram; 28 Terry Irvin; 37 Harry Kruger; 4 Darrell Moir; 32 Ray Odums; Special teams: 2 J. T. Hay K/P; Italics indicate International player

== Awards and records ==
=== 1983 CFL All-Stars ===
- LB – Danny Bass, CFL All-Star
- DB – Richard Hall, CFL All-Star
