= 1983 Hamilton Tiger-Cats season =

Season of Canadian Football League team the Hamilton Tiger-Cats

- Head coach: Bud Riley (4-8); Al Bruno (interim)
- Home stadium: Ivor Wynne Stadium

Results
- Record: 5–10–1
- Division place: 3rd, East
- Playoffs: Lost East Final
- Team MOP: Johnny Shepherd
- Team MOC: Bernie Ruoff
- Team MOR: Johnny Shepherd

Uniform

The 1983 Hamilton Tiger-Cats season was the 26th season for the team in the Canadian Football League (CFL) and their 35th overall. The Tiger-Cats finished in third place in the East Division with a 5–10–1 record. They defeated the Ottawa Rough Riders in the East Semi-Final, but lost to the eventual Grey Cup champion Toronto Argonauts in the East Final.

== Preseason ==
Week	Date	Opponent	Result	Record
A	June 10	at Toronto Argonauts	L 6–24	1–0
B	June 15	vs. Toronto Argonauts	W 35–24	1–1
C	June 22	vs. Montreal Concordes	W 25–18	2–1
D	June 29	at Ottawa Rough Riders	L 40–47	2–2

== Regular season ==
=== Season standings ===
East Division
Pos	Team	Pld	W	L	T	PF	PA	PD	Pts	Div	Stk
1	Toronto Argonauts (C, Q)	16	12	4	0	452	328	124	24	4–2	W2
2	Ottawa Rough Riders (Q)	16	8	8	0	384	424	−40	16	2–4	L2
3	Hamilton Tiger-Cats (Q)	16	5	10	1	389	498	−109	11	3–2–1	T1
4	Montreal Concordes	16	5	10	1	367	447	−80	11	2–3–1	T1

Source: "1983 Regular Season Standings". Archived from the original on 2008-08-08.
(C) First round bye; (Q) Qualified for playoffs

=== Season schedule ===
Week	Game	Date	Opponent	Result	Record
1	1	July 9	vs. Edmonton Eskimos	L 32–35	0–1
2	2	July 16	at Saskatchewan Roughriders	W 50–19	1–1
3	3	July 22	at Winnipeg Blue Bombers	L 18–29	1–2
4	4	July 30	vs. BC Lions	L 20–34	1–3
5	5	Aug 6	at Toronto Argonauts	W 31–18	2–3
6	6	Aug 13	vs. Ottawa Rough Riders	W 24–22	3–3
7	7	Aug 21	at Calgary Stampeders	L 15–26	3–4
8	Bye				
9	8	Sept 5	vs. Montreal Concordes	W 35–30	4–4
10	9	Sept 11	at Edmonton Eskimos	L 21–50	4–5
11	10	Sept 18	vs. Toronto Argonauts	L 16–50	4–6
12	11	Sept 25	at Ottawa Rough Riders	L 25–29	4–7
13	12	Oct 1	vs. Winnipeg Blue Bombers	L 19–34	4–8
14	Bye				
15	13	Oct 15	vs. Saskatchewan Roughriders	W 34–22	5–8
16	14	Oct 22	at BC Lions	L 16–41	5–9
17	15	Oct 30	vs. Calgary Stampeders	L 12–35	5–10
18	16	Nov 6	at Montreal Concordes	T 21–21	5–10–1

== Postseason ==
=== Schedule ===
Game	Date	Opponent	Result
East Semi-Final	Nov 13	at Ottawa Rough Riders	W 33–31
East Final	Nov 20	at Toronto Argonauts	L 36–41

== Roster ==
1983 Hamilton Tiger-Cats final roster
Quarterbacks: 5 Dieter Brock; 12 Pete Gales; 9 Jeff Tedford; Running backs: 22 Mark Bragagnolo; 21 Rufus Crawford; 32 Dave Graffi; 19 Johnny Shepherd; Wide receivers: 1 Keith Baker; 25 Scott Collie; 73 Ron Johnson; 17 Wayne Lee; 27 Dom Vetro; Tight ends: 23 Rocky Dipietro; 34 Steve Kearns	Offensive linemen: 63 Marv Allemang T; 53 Jeff Arp G; 51 Pat Brady G; 54 Ross Francis G; 62 Paul Gohier T; 60 Bill Howard C; 69 Paul Palma T; 50 Henry Waszczuk C; Defensive linemen: 66 Mike Barker DT; 77 Grover Covington DE; 65 Mitchell Price DE; 58 Dave Sauve DT; 61 Mike Walker DT	Linebackers: 72 Leo Ezerins; 41 Greg Gary; 39 Ed Gataveckas; 38 Kelly Hamilton; 36 John Priestner; 31 Ben Zambiasi; Defensive backs: 14 Gerald Bess; 16 Howard Fields; 26 Mike McIntyre; 20 Mark Streeter; 28 Felix Wright; 18 Mark Young; Special teams: 10 Bernie Ruoff K/P; Injured list: 3 Steve Stapler WR; Italics indicate American players

== Awards and honours ==
=== 1983 CFL All-Stars ===
- Johnny Shepherd, Running back
