= Tom Krebs =

Canadian football player (born 1957)

No. 56, 58
- Position: Offensive lineman

Personal information
- Born: October 17, 1957 (age 69); Canada
- Listed height: 6 ft 3 in (1.91 m)
- Listed weight: 248 lb (112 kg)

Career information
- College: Utah

Career history
- Calgary Stampeders (1979–1983); Edmonton Eskimos (1983)

Awards and highlights
- First-team All-WAC (1978)

Thomas Krebs (born October 17, 1957) is a Canadian former professional football offensive lineman who played five seasons in the Canadian Football League (CFL) with the Calgary Stampeders and Edmonton Eskimos. He played college football at the University of Utah.

== Early life ==
Thomas Krebs was born on October 17, 1957. He is a native of Calgary. He played college football at the University of Utah, where he was a four-year letterman for the Utah Utes from 1975 to 1978. He was a three-year starter and earned first-team All-Western Athletic Conference honors in 1978.

== Professional career ==
Krebs was a territorial exemption of the Calgary Stampeders in the 1979 CFL draft. He decided to sign with the Stampeders in January 1979. He dressed in 11 games during his rookie year in 1979 and was listed as an offensive guard. He also missed part of the 1979 season due to knee surgery. Before the start of the 1980 season, Krebs underwent tests for leukemia but it turned out to be a spleen problem. He dressed in all 16 games in 1980 as the Stampeders went 9–7 and lost in the Western semifinal to the Winnipeg Blue Bombers by a score of 32–14. The 1980 Stampeders won the CFL's Outstanding Offensive Line award. He moved to centre in 1981, dressing in 15 games as the team finished 6–10. In 1982, Krebs signed a five-year $350,000 contract with the Stampeders. He dressed in 16 games during the 1982 season as Calgary went 9–6–1 and lost in the Western semifinal to the Blue Bombers. Krebs dressed in three games for Calgary in 1983 before requesting a trade, later saying "it wasn't fun anymore" and "I had to get out."

After two missed practices, Krebs and a 1984 second round draft pick were traded to the Edmonton Eskimos for Ted Milian and Harry Doering on August 3, 1983. Krebs dressed in 13 games for Edmonton in 1983. Krebs correctly predicted that the 8–7 Stampeders would lose their final game of the season to the 4–11 Saskatchewan Roughriders, allowing 8–8 Edmonton to make the playoffs by way of tiebreaker. The player Krebs was traded for, Ted Milian, botched a crucial snap late in the game. The Eskimos lost in the Western semifinal to Winnipeg. Krebs announced his retirement in January 1984, stating "My heart isn't in it anymore. It wasn't even in it this past year. I hated playing football last year. I can't go through the motions."

== Personal life ==
Krebs is the son of CFL player Hal Krebs.
