= Elimination from postseason contention =

Inability of a sports team to reach its league's postseason

Elimination from postseason contention, or elimination from playoff contention, refers to the point when it is no longer mathematically possible for a sports team to qualify for its league's annual postseason, regardless of the outcomes of the team and the team(s) they are trailing in remaining games. This occurs when the number of wins by teams leading for all possible postseason spots, including a first-place finish (division title) or an at-large bid (where applicable) combined with the number of losses by a team trailing for the available postseason spots exceeds the number of games on the regular season schedule. Tiebreakers may also apply, when the combination of the number of wins by leading teams and losses by the team trailing matches the number of games on the regular season schedule.

The concept of being "eliminated from postseason contention" is applicable to sports leagues and programs where qualifying requires a first-place finish or at-large bid (i.e., a "wild card" spot). It does not apply to certain sports leagues, often (but not always) for some high school and college-level sports where all teams participate in the playoffs or conference tournament, regardless of record. It also does not strictly apply to those sports that do not have a postseason or whose postseason criteria are too subjective to determine until the selectors make their decisions (this is especially true in American college sports, where teams in the four most lucrative and reputed athletic conferences are regularly awarded invitational bids to postseason tournaments even if they would otherwise have been eliminated had they been in a mid-major conference).

== Definition ==
When a sports season is reaching its conclusion, ranking watchers, such as the media, keep track of which teams have clinched divisions and playoff berths, and what teams close to this point must accomplish in order to achieve this ahead of the season's conclusion. Often, a team that has won a championship (such as a conference or divisional championship) is automatically granted a postseason berth, regardless of record, and there are still teams remaining in contention for one or more "wild card" or "at-large" playoff berths. At the same time, the poorer performing teams face the prospect of elimination before and sometimes long before the season is over. Elimination occurs when, regardless of the outcomes of all unplayed games on the league schedule, the eliminated teams miss the playoffs. In exceptional cases, such as forfeits against a leading team, an "eliminated" team may be chosen to advance in their stead.

The term "elimination" when used in the sense of the regular season differs from elimination when used in the postseason. In the postseason, a team is said to be "eliminated" or "knocked out" when it is defeated by another team it is playing in a round of the postseason, thereby ending the team's season. But a team eliminated during the regular season continues to play the remaining games on its schedule as a lame duck, and the value to the team's coaches and players in seriously contesting these games may vary (see below). In both cases, elimination prevents the team from further pursuing the league championship.

== Effect on rest of the season ==
=== History ===
In the early days of organized sports, clubs were essentially gate-driven enterprises that depended on ticket sales for most of their revenue, and most leagues did not feature formal playoffs, instead awarding the championship to the team with the best regular season record. Once a team was no longer a contender for the best record in the league, this often served to seriously diminish interest in the team's remaining schedule from their fan base.

Compounding this issue was that sports leagues in this era generally operated on the principle that a visiting team was entitled to a percentage of the gate receipts. If this cut was insufficient to meet the costs of making the trip, the visiting team would often be reluctant to travel, let alone play, especially if they were also out of championship contention.

Often, especially in the early days of baseball, team owners deemed it more profitable to forfeit scheduled league games in order to play more lucrative exhibition contests.

The establishment of the National League of Professional Baseball Clubs in 1876 was the first serious effort to eliminate this practice, as the NL adhered to a strictly-enforced policy of expelling teams that refused to honor scheduling commitments. Further to this, in the early days of the NL, the league had (and often enforced) a policy of moving games to an opponent's stadium in the event that the paid attendance fell to the point where visiting teams would be left unable to meet their expenses to make the trip.

The most notorious case of this came in 1899, when the Cleveland Spiders recorded the worst season in Major League Baseball history. At the time, games moved to opponents' stadiums were recorded as road games, and with paid attendances in Cleveland being anemic, the Spiders had 35 of their 77 home games moved. They finished with 101 road losses, a record that cannot be broken under modern MLB scheduling rules, and the Spiders folded after the 1899 season.

=== Modern era ===
While a team that has been officially eliminated must still play its remaining games on the regular season schedule, the team's behavior may differ from one that is striving for the postseason or has already clinched the playoffs. And among those "eliminated" teams, the teams' behavior will vary.

Oftentimes a team would be eliminated from clinching a division title, home field advantage, or other postseason advantages, but the wildcard or lower-seeded spot might still be attainable thus some teams may play with an effort to win in order to choose its first-round opponents.

When the team is eliminated from postseason contention, it does not need to worry about winning to qualify for the postseason, and the urgency to win may be lower. As a result, coaches may give playing time to backup and other lesser players who would not be used when a win is urgent, thereby giving them some real-game experience in an attempt to develop them. This is especially true at the high school and college levels, especially if a coach sees a number of players that are "promising". Former starters (such as seniors on a high school or college team) will often still be asked to play a role in helping develop their younger teammates, but their roles may be different than before. Additionally, a team may take greater risks during the remaining games in order for players to master new skills or try plays a coaching staff believes will help them win in the future. And if a team has many younger players the coaching staff will sometimes play different combinations of players to see which ones work best together, another building block for future seasons.

Some teams who are practically or even mathematically eliminated before the trade deadline will hold a "fire sale", where they trade away many of its veteran players, especially expensive star players, to competing teams for less expensive and usually younger players. Teams usually have a fire sale for financial reasons. The term "fire sale" is generally thought of as different from merely "rebuilding" a team, because during a rebuilding process, teams often obtain players who are already in the major leagues or who are close to being major-league-ready, while retaining at least some of their key veterans (such as a franchise player) while also getting players from their minor league system; most rebuilding teams have few veterans remaining to jettison in the first place. On the other hand, trades in a fire sale often bring a team draft picks and prospects who have little to no major-league experience in their sport, in exchange for proven, experienced veterans. The term "fire sale" also comes from the perception that the team is trying to get rid of all its players. Getting rid of veterans and stars with high salaries does reduce the payroll which saves the team money for the remainder of the season.

Often, an eliminated team will now have the opportunity to play the role of spoiler – that is, possibly eliminate one or more teams from contention that had a chance to make the playoffs (especially if they were "on the bubble," or holding one of the lowest qualifying positions while still in contention and, as a result, their own qualification depends on the outcomes of other games and/or other teams' performances) or – if the opponent is in the playoffs, cause them to get a lower seed in the elimination tournament and/or lose home field advantage they had already provisionally secured.

Pride and opportunity also play into eliminated teams still striving to achieve victory on multiple occasions. These teams often want to go down swinging – that is, play their best even if there isn't a realistic chance they can defeat, much less compete with, future opponents. Sometimes, teams will still have to play an opponent they have a good chance of defeating, even if the opponent has made the playoffs: The teams may match up well on the field and have comparable playing ability, despite a disparity in win–loss records; the other team has players who are unavailable (starters are resting, key players are injured or suspended, etc.); or the opponent is from a lower division and, even with the opponent's excellent win–loss record, the team with the losing record can rather easily outmatch the opponent and, although with some work, readily achieve victory. For cases such as a divisional or geographical rivalry, a losing team nearly always puts in effort against their rival as it would be considered bad form by the fans of either team, along with the players and outside observers to not play with a full effort against a team which is considered the rival most identified with by a team.

Other reasons eliminated teams still try hard to win include achieving an improvement over the previous year's record, attempting to finish the season with a winning record (especially if winning the final game is needed to achieve that goal), or the team wants to avoid the stigma of a last place finish or worse, if they have yet to win, a winless season. For teams in sports that have been eliminated from a wild-card berth but qualifying is still possible by winning a conference tournament, the objective might be to win as many games as possible to try to earn as high of a seed as possible for the conference tournament, thereby increasing their chances of making the playoffs after all.

Teams that operate as for-profit operations may still be compelled to put a competitive product on display, to ensure fans continue to attend the games and purchase tickets. This is less of an issue at the major professional levels, where a greater portion of revenue comes from television rights fees that are locked into contracts years in advance. In league systems that operate using promotion and relegation, even if a team may be eliminated from a postseason tournament, it may have to continue to play at a competitive level (for instance in the Premier League, one quarter is awarded on a merit basis based on final league position, the top club getting twenty times as much as the bottom club, and equal steps all the way down the table), and to avoid being relegated to a lower league (and thus lose a significant amount of revenue).

In some cases, a team with a bad losing record may attempt to achieve the worst record in the league in order to attain a high draft pick. This is sometimes referred to as "tanking" the remainder of the season, and is sometimes done by putting players on the field that are too young and/or inexperienced to realistically be expected to win many games. In response to such practices, the National Hockey League and National Basketball Association both impose a draft lottery to discourage teams from deliberately tanking the rest of their season for a higher draft pick. The injection of random luck into the draft process can have the unintended consequence of depriving a team that is legitimately deprived of talent the opportunity to acquire a top prospect (this is especially true of the NHL, where because players are drafted at a younger age compared to the NFL or NBA and must typically complete junior and minor league development before reaching the majors, there is typically only one NHL-ready prospect in any given draft).

Conversely, if the team is planning on making changes to its roster or coaching staff as a result of the poor performance, it may do so during this time in order to give new players and coaches some experience and try to keep players – those who may be sought by other teams – with their team.

An eliminated team's coach and/or general manager may be expected to be fired shortly before or once the season ends, even if they are under multiyear contracts. This is if they are blamed for the team being out of contention for the postseason, due to the general manager's poor draft picks and/or disappointing signings, coach's poor tactics, etc. Also the coach or/and general manager is seen as a poor fit or otherwise does not relate well with others – players and other coaches, the media, his superiors and so forth – and a change in leadership is apparently forthcoming or desired. Often, there will be rumors of a coach and/or manager departure – often by dismissal or forced resignation (also known as "by mutual consent") – with said rumors often beginning several games before the end of the season. Often the team will dismiss the coach and/or manager once the team is eliminated from reaching the postseason, rather than waiting for the conclusion of the season, as this cuts short the coach/managers' "lame duck" status and clears the way for new hires. In that case, an interim coach and/or interim manager will be appointed to see out the remainder of the season, though their predecessors may still remain on the club payroll as a "special advisor" until their contracts expires. Coaches and managers can be released with less financial consequences to their team, compared to players who are often under guaranteed contracts making them somewhat costly to buy out.

Still, in some cases, a team with a losing record – or one that has yet to win – may not even try to win and/or play very poorly in the remainder of their games; in other words, they "quit", even against other teams that are eliminated and/or have performed exceptionally poorly during the season. Here, the philosophy might be that the current season is best forgotten once concluded, and that with changes (sometimes wholesale) during the off-season things will be better in the future. Often, these cases arise when:

- Team or player morale is poor. This will often result from players having little to zero confidence in the coach/general manager and staff, especially if the team is performing below expectations and other factors – for instance, a head coach's abilities being called into question – come into play.
- With most or all preseason goals – and new and adjusted goals made as the season progresses – no longer achievable, the team no longer sees any value or worth in their remaining games, even if some of those games are considered by others to be "winnable."
- In sports where there is a high rate of injury, the risk of going onto the field for a meaningless game, and subsequently suffering a serious injury, outweighs the mostly nonexistent benefits. (See also: resting the starters)
- The team is protesting against the league. In 2003, St. Bonaventure University's basketball team protested sanctions the NCAA levied against the team (the NCAA stripped the team of all their wins and barred them from the 2003 Atlantic 10 men's basketball tournament for having a transfer student with inadequate academic credentials on the squad) by outright forfeiting the last two games of the season.

== Spoiler effect ==
Teams eliminated from playoffs can affect other teams in the league as they play, often having a spoiler effect on teams still in contention for playoff spots. For example, a baseball team that is ten games out of contention for a playoff berth could defeat a team that has a playoff berth several times. This could cause the would-be playoff team to be passed by in the rankings by the team directly behind it before the final positions at the end of the season are determined.

In individual participant sports, such as automobile racing, a racer with no hope of obtaining a championship title could prevent a racer with a chance at the title by defeating them, preventing the contending racer from earning critical points toward winning the title. Instead, the title would go to the contender directly behind him in the rankings, provided that second-tier racer is close enough to surpass and they win their own competition.

=== Notable eliminations ===
In a testament to the Dodgers–Giants rivalry, the 1982 Los Angeles Dodgers knocked the 1982 San Francisco Giants out of playoff contention on the second-to-last day of the season. With the Dodgers needing one more win to tie the lead for the division, the Giants defeated the Dodgers on the final day to eliminate their rivals from contention, much to the delight of the fans at Candlestick Park.

During the 1983 CFL season, the Calgary Stampeders entered the final week with an 8–7 record. With only a tie at home against the already-eliminated 4–11 Saskatchewan Roughriders, Calgary would have not only made the playoffs but would have dethroned their bitter archrivals the Edmonton Eskimos, who were the five-time defending Grey Cup champions but had struggled to finish with an 8–8 record. Calgary led most of the game and eventually extended their lead to 23–20 with only 2:45 remaining, and only needed to hold Saskatchewan to a field goal from that point since at that time overtime was not used in the CFL regular season. On their next possession however, Calgary botched a snap to punter Mike McTague, who fumbled. Saskatchewan recovered the ball on their opponents' 43 yard line, and on the ensuing drive Roughriders coach Reuben Berry, realizing a tie would be of no value for his team, crucially chose to gamble while facing a third down and eleven situation well within the field goal range of kicker Dave Ridgway. The Roughriders converted on the third and long play, scored a touchdown with just 27 seconds remaining, and held on to win 27–23. The upset ended Calgary's season since Edmonton had a slim advantage in decisive tiebreaker (points-for-and-against ratio in divisional games) although the Eskimos' unexpected reprieve only lasted one week as they were throttled 49–22 by the Winnipeg Blue Bombers in the Western Semi-Final.

On the second-to-last day of the NHL regular season, the long-eliminated Ottawa Senators knocked off playoff contenders twice in 20 years. First, they defeated the defending Stanley Cup champion New Jersey Devils, who were in playoff contention for the entire season on the second-to-last day of the 1995–96 NHL regular season, knocking the Devils out of the playoffs in favor of the Tampa Bay Lightning. 20 years later, they did it again, this time defeating the Boston Bruins, who were in playoff contention for the entire season on that second-to-last day of the 2015–16 NHL regular season; this result, combined with a win by the Philadelphia Flyers over their in-state rival, the Pittsburgh Penguins, knocked the Bruins out of the playoffs in favor of the Flyers.

During the final day of the 2011 Major League Baseball regular season, in the American League, the already long eliminated Baltimore Orioles defeated the Boston Red Sox, who had been seen all season as playoff contenders. Their loss, combined with a Tampa Bay Rays' win over the AL East winner and Red Sox rival New York Yankees by two dramatic home runs, first in the 9th inning by Dan Johnson and later in extra innings by Evan Longoria, knocked the Red Sox out of the playoffs in favor of the Rays. On the same day, the NL East champion Philadelphia Phillies, who had the league's best record for weeks, defeated the Atlanta Braves, and that combined with the St. Louis Cardinals victory over the NL Central rival Houston Astros, eliminated the Braves from the postseason in favor of the Cardinals, who went on to win the World Series that year.

On the final matchday of the CONCACAF qualification tournament for the 2018 FIFA World Cup, the long-eliminated Trinidad and Tobago defeated the United States, who were overwhelming favorites to qualify and combined with wins by Panama over the already-qualified Costa Rica and Honduras over the already-qualified Mexico, not only eliminated the United States from World Cup contention for the first time in 32 years, but also meant that Panama qualified for their first-ever World Cup.

On the final day of the 2017 NFL season, the eliminated Cincinnati Bengals defeated the Baltimore Ravens, combined with a win by the Buffalo Bills over the Miami Dolphins, not only knocked the Ravens out of the playoffs, but also meant that the Buffalo Bills qualified for their first postseason appearance since 1999. That same day, the eliminated Arizona Cardinals defeated the Seattle Seahawks, combined with a win by the Atlanta Falcons over their rival, Carolina Panthers, eliminated the Seahawks from the postseason. On the final day of the 2003 NFL season, the eliminated Cardinals defeated the Minnesota Vikings on a last-second touchdown pass that erased an eleven-point deficit and knocked the Vikings, who had started the season 6–0, out of the playoffs in favor of their rival, the Green Bay Packers.

When the 2019–20 NBA season resumed on July 31, 2020, the 22 teams who had the best regular-season records qualified for an eight-game seeding tournament that determined the sixteen participants for the league's playoff tournament. A Phoenix Suns win over the Dallas Mavericks on the second-to-last-day of the season caused the San Antonio Spurs to be eliminated from the playoffs for the first time since the 1996–97 season.

== See also ==
- Garbage time
- Sports league ranking
- Magic number (sports)
