= Hal Krebs =

Canadian football player (1937–2019)

Profile
- Position: Guard

Personal information
- Born: October 2, 1937; Edmonton, Alberta, Canada
- Died: June 3, 2019 (aged 81); Calgary, Alberta, Canada
- Listed height: 6 ft 0 in (1.83 m)
- Listed weight: 230 lb (104 kg)

Career history
- 1956: Edmonton Eskimos
- 1957: Hamilton Tiger-Cats
- 1957: Toronto Argonauts
- 1958–1961: Montreal Alouettes
- 1962–1967: Calgary Stampeders

Awards and highlights
- Grey Cup champion (1956)

Harold D. Krebs (October 2, 1937 – June 3, 2019) was a Canadian professional football player who played for the Edmonton Eskimos, Hamilton Tiger-Cats, Toronto Argonauts, Montreal Alouettes and Calgary Stampeders. He won the Grey Cup with the Eskimos in 1956. He played junior football previously for the Kitchener-Waterloo Dutchmen and London Lords. His son, Tom Krebs also played for the Edmonton Eskimos in the 1980s. He was later working in the real estate investment business in Calgary. In 1969, Krebs filed a lawsuit against the Stampeders, alleging that he was forced to play games while injured. He died on June 3, 2019.
