= Vancouver Nighthawks =

- League: World Basketball League
- Founded: 1988
- Folded: 1989
- Stadium: BC Place
- Capacity: 10,500
- Location: Vancouver, British Columbia
- Team colours: Red, Black, White
- General manager: Jerry Weber; Russ Williams
- Head coach: Mike Frink
- Ownership: Don Burns (Majority owner until July 8, 1988); World Basketball League (After July 8, 1988)

The Vancouver Nighthawks was a professional basketball franchise based in Vancouver, British Columbia, in 1988. The team, which played its inaugural season in the World Basketball League, folded before the schedule ended.

The Nighthawks played its home games at the BC Place Stadium.

== Personnel ==
Ownership

- Don Burns Until July 8, 1988
- World Basketball League from July 8, 1988

General Manager

- Jerry Weber until July 21, 1988
- Russ Williams from July 21, 1988 (Acting GM)

Head Coaches

- Mike Frink

Assistant Coaches

- Phil Langley

== Season by season record ==
Season	GP	W	L	Pct.	GB	Finish	Playoffs
1988	54	18	36	.333	14	6th WBL	Did Not Qualify
Totals	54	18	36	.333	14	–	–
