= Kelvin Pruenster =

Canadian gridiron football player (born 1960)

No. 66
- Position: Offensive tackle

Personal information
- Born: December 6, 1960 (age 65); Toronto, Ontario, Canada
- Listed height: 6 ft 6 in (1.98 m)
- Listed weight: 265 lb (120 kg)

Career information
- College: Cal Poly Pomona University

Career history
- 1983-1991: Toronto Argonauts

Awards and highlights
- 2× Grey Cup champion (1983, 1991)

Kelvin Pruenster (born December 6, 1960) is a Canadian former professional football offensive lineman who played nine seasons in the Canadian Football League (CFL) for the Toronto Argonauts.
