= Kerry Parker =

American gridiron football player (born 1955)

Profile
- Position: Defensive back

Personal information
- Born: October 3, 1955 (age 71); New Orleans, Louisiana, U.S.

Career information
- College: Grambling State

Career history
- Oakland Raiders (1979); British Columbia Lions (1980–1983, 1985); Kansas City Chiefs (1984); Toronto Argonauts (1986–1987); Buffalo Bills (1987); Hamilton Tiger-Cats (1987)

Awards and highlights
- CFL All-Star: 1983
- Stats at Pro Football Reference

Kerry Anthony Parker (born October 3, 1955) was a football player in the CFL for seven years. Parker played defensive back for the British Columbia Lions and Toronto Argonauts from 1980-1987. Parker also played part of two seasons in the National Football League. He played college football at Grambling State University and attended high school at Carver Senior High School in New Orleans.
