= John Sturdivant =

American gridiron football player (born 1956)

No. 57
- Position: Defensive lineman

Personal information
- Born: May 25, 1956 (age 70); Newport News, Virginia, U.S.
- Listed height: 6 ft 4 in (1.93 m)
- Listed weight: 245 lb (111 kg)

Career information
- College: Maryland

Career history
- 1982: New York Jets*
- 1983: New Jersey Generals*
- 1983: Miami Dolphins*
- 1983: New York Jets*
- 1983–1987: Winnipeg Blue Bombers
- * Offseason or practice squad member only

John Leighton Sturdivant (born May 25, 1956) is an American former professional football defensive linemen who played five seasons with the Winnipeg Blue Bombers of the Canadian Football League (CFL). He played college football at the University of Maryland, College Park. He was also a member of the New York Jets, New Jersey Generals and Miami Dolphins.

== Early life ==
John Leighton Sturdivant was born on May 26, 1956, in Newport News, Virginia. He attended Bethel High School in Hampton, Virginia.

In 1977, Sturdivant accepted a scholarship to play college football for the Maryland Terrapins of the University of Maryland, College Park. He was an art major with a liberal arts minor at Maryland. In September 1978, head coach Jerry Claiborne granted Sturdivant a release from his scholarship. A week later, Sturdivant accepted a scholarship to play for the Ohio State Buckeyes of Ohio State University. He had to sit out the 1978 season due to NCAA transfer rules. Sturdivant did not end up playing for the Buckeyes.

== Professional career ==
Sturdivant played for a minor league football team in 1981.

Sturdivant signed with the New York Jets on June 15, 1982, later surviving the team's final preseason cutdown, but was released before the start of the regular season.

Sturdivant was signed by the New Jersey Generals of the United States Football League on October 28, 1982. He was released by the Generals on February 28, 1983.

Sturdivant signed with the Miami Dolphins on May 10, 1983. He was waived on August 8, 1983.

Sturdivant signed with the Jets again on August 11, 1983. He was released by the Jets on August 29, 1983.

Sturdivant then signed with the Winnipeg Blue Bombers of the Canadian Football League and dressed in one game during the 1983 season. He signed a multi-year contract extension on December 19, 1983. He dressed in 14 games in 1984, 12 games in 1985, and 12 games in 1986. He dressed in one game during the 1987 season and left the team after refusing to be transferred to the practice roster.
