= Norman Gibbs (Canadian football) =

American gridiron football player (born 1960)

No. 8, 9
- Position: Quarterback

Personal information
- Born: June 29, 1960 (age 66); Baton Rouge, Louisiana, U.S
- Listed height: 6 ft 1 in (1.85 m)
- Listed weight: 185 lb (84 kg)

Career information
- High school: Southern University Laboratory (Baton Rouge)
- College: Southern (1978–1982)

Career history
- 1983–1985: Winnipeg Blue Bombers
- 1986: Toronto Argonauts

Awards and highlights
- Grey Cup champion (1984)

Norman Gibbs (born June 29, 1960) is an American former professional football quarterback who played three seasons in the Canadian Football League (CFL) with the Winnipeg Blue Bombers and Toronto Argonauts. He played college football at Southern University.

== Early life and college ==
Norman Gibbs was born on June 29, 1960, in Baton Rouge, Louisiana. He attended high school at Southern University Laboratory School in Baton Rouge. He played four years of football there and also one year of baseball as a senior. Gibbs was inducted into Southern University Laboratory's athletics hall of fame in 2010.

Gibbs played college football for the Southern Jaguars of Southern University from 1978 to 1982. He completed 235 of 343 passes for 3,857 yards, 28 touchdowns, and 32 interceptions during his college career.

== Professional career ==
Gibbs dressed in six games, starting one, for the Winnipeg Blue Bombers of the Canadian Football League (CFL) in 1983, completing 15 of 33 passes (45.5%) for 220 yards and two interceptions while also rushing for ten yards and a touchdown. He was released on June 25, 1984. On November 4, 1984, it was reported that he had been re-signed by the Blue Bombers, ahead of their semifinal playoff game against the Edmonton Eskimos. On November 18, 1984, the Blue Bombers won the 72nd Grey Cup against the Hamilton Tiger-Cats by a score of 47–17. Gibbs dressed in one game for the Blue Bombers in 1985 but record any statistics. He became a free agent on March 1, 1986, and re-signed with the Blue Bombers in May 1986.

On June 23, 1986, Gibbs was traded to the Toronto Argonauts for future considerations after being beat out for the third-string quarterback position by Homer Jordan. Gibbs dressed in nine games for the Argonauts in 1986, completing 32 of 52 passes (61.5%) for 327 yards and two interceptions while also rushing 14 times for 99 yards.
