= Reuben Berry =

American gridiron football player and coach (1934–1998)

Biographical details
- Born: July 3, 1934; Aurora, Missouri, U.S.
- Died: April 6, 1998 (aged 63); Tulsa, Oklahoma, U.S.

Playing career
- 1957–1958: Southwest Missouri State
- Position: Quarterback

Coaching career (HC unless noted)
- 1959: Pierce City HS (MO)
- 1960–1962: Mount Vernon HS (MO)
- 1963: Fort Scott (assistant)
- 1964–1965: Sterling
- 1966–1968: Southwest Missouri State (assistant)
- 1969–1970: Missouri Southern
- 1971: Northeastern Oklahoma A&M (DC)
- 1972–1976: Northeastern Oklahoma A&M
- 1979–1982: BC Lions (DL)
- 1983: Saskatchewan Roughriders (assistant)
- 1983–1984: Saskatchewan Roughriders

Head coaching record
- Overall: 10–15–1 (CFL); 8–29–1 (college); 36–13–1 (junior college)

Reuben Leonard Berry (July 3, 1934 – April 6, 1998) was an American gridiron football coach. He served as the head coach for the Saskatchewan Roughriders of the Canadian Football League (CFL) from 1983 to 1984.

A graduate of Southwest Missouri State University, Berry's coaching career began as an assistant at Fort Scott Community Junior College in Fort Scott, Kansas. In 1964 he moved to Sterling College, where he remained until March 1966 when he accepted the head coaching job at Fort Scott Community Junior College. Berry's tenure as FSCJC's head coached ended before he coached a single game when three months later he resigned to join the coaching staff at Southwest Missouri State.

From 1969 to 1970, Berry was the head coach at Missouri Southern State University, where he had an overall record of 4–15–1. After leaving MSSU, Berry served as the head coach at Northeastern Oklahoma A&M College and as the defensive line coach for the BC Lions.

On August 21, 1983, Berry replaced Joe Faragalli as head coach of the Saskatchewan Roughriders after a 1–5 start. The Roughriders missed the West Division playoffs in each of Berry's two seasons as head coach and on November 8, 1984, Berry was fired by the Roughriders.

Berry died on April 6, 1998, in Tulsa, Oklahoma. His son, Todd Berry, is the executive director of the American Football Coaches Association (AFCA).

== Head coaching record ==
=== College ===
Year	Team	Overall	Conference	Standing	Bowl/playoffs
Sterling Warriors (Kansas Collegiate Athletic Conference) (1964–1965)
1964	Sterling	1–8	1–8	10th	
1965	Sterling	3–6	3–6	T–7th	
Sterling:		4–14	4–14		
Missouri Southern Lions (NAIA independent) (1969–1970)
1969	Missouri Southern	2–8			
1970	Missouri Southern	2–7–1			
Missouri Southern:		4–15–1			
Total:		8–29–1			

=== Professional ===
Team	Year	Regular season					Postseason			
Team	Year	Won	Lost	Ties	Win %	Finish	Won	Lost	Win %	Result
SSK	1983	4	6	0	.400	5th in West	-	-	-	-
SSK	1984	6	9	1	.406	4th in West	-	-	-	-
SSK Total		10	15	1	.404		-	-	-	-
CFL Total		10	15	1	.404		-	-	-	-
Total		10	15	1	.404		-	-	-	-
