= Waymon Alridge =

Canadian football player (born 1960)

Profile
- Positions: Wide receiver, Slotback

Personal information
- Born: March 30, 1960 (age 66)
- Listed height: 5 ft 10 in (1.78 m)
- Listed weight: 180 lb (82 kg)

Career information
- College: Nevada – Las Vegas

Career history
- 1983: Calgary Stampeders
- 1984–1985: Ottawa Rough Riders
- 1986: Edmonton Eskimos

Waymon Alridge (born March 30, 1960) is a former professional Canadian football wide receiver and slotback who played for the Calgary Stampeders, Ottawa Rough Riders, and Edmonton Eskimos of the Canadian Football League (CFL). From 1983 to 1986, Alridge played in 29 regular season games, mostly with the Rough Riders. He made 95 catches for 1,674 receiving yards and 10 touchdowns over the course of his career. He played college football for the UNLV Rebels of the University of Nevada, Las Vegas.

== Professional career ==
In 1983, Alridge played two regular season games for the Calgary Stampeders. He recorded eight catches for 152 yards and one touchdown in his rookie season.

Alridge took a more prominent role after moving to the Ottawa Rough Riders in 1984, where he began the season as a slotback. In a week 3 win against the Hamilton Tiger-Cats, Alridge caught one pass for 75 yards and another for 90 yards. His performance in that game led The Globe and Mail to describe him as "the newest Rider star". After the Rough Riders traded wide receiver Tyron Gray to the Saskatchewan Roughriders, Alridge was moved to the wide receiver position. Playing in 13 regular season games, he finished the 1984 season with 700 receiving yards on 36 catches with five touchdowns.

In 1985, Alridge started as a wide receiver for the Rough Riders. In a week 3 contest against the Edmonton Eskimos, Alridge caught two touchdown passes. Alridge suffered from injuries in the second half of the season, including a concussion and a foot injury. He recorded 49 catches for 797 yards and four touchdowns in 1985 over the course of 13 games.

Immediately before the start of the regular season in 1986, the Rough Riders traded Alridge to the Winnipeg Blue Bombers to receive running back Glenn Steele. He never played in a regular season game for the Blue Bombers. Alridge eventually was signed by the Edmonton Eskimos in 1986, where he played a single regular season game, making two catches.
