= BC Place =

Stadium in Vancouver, British Columbia, Canada

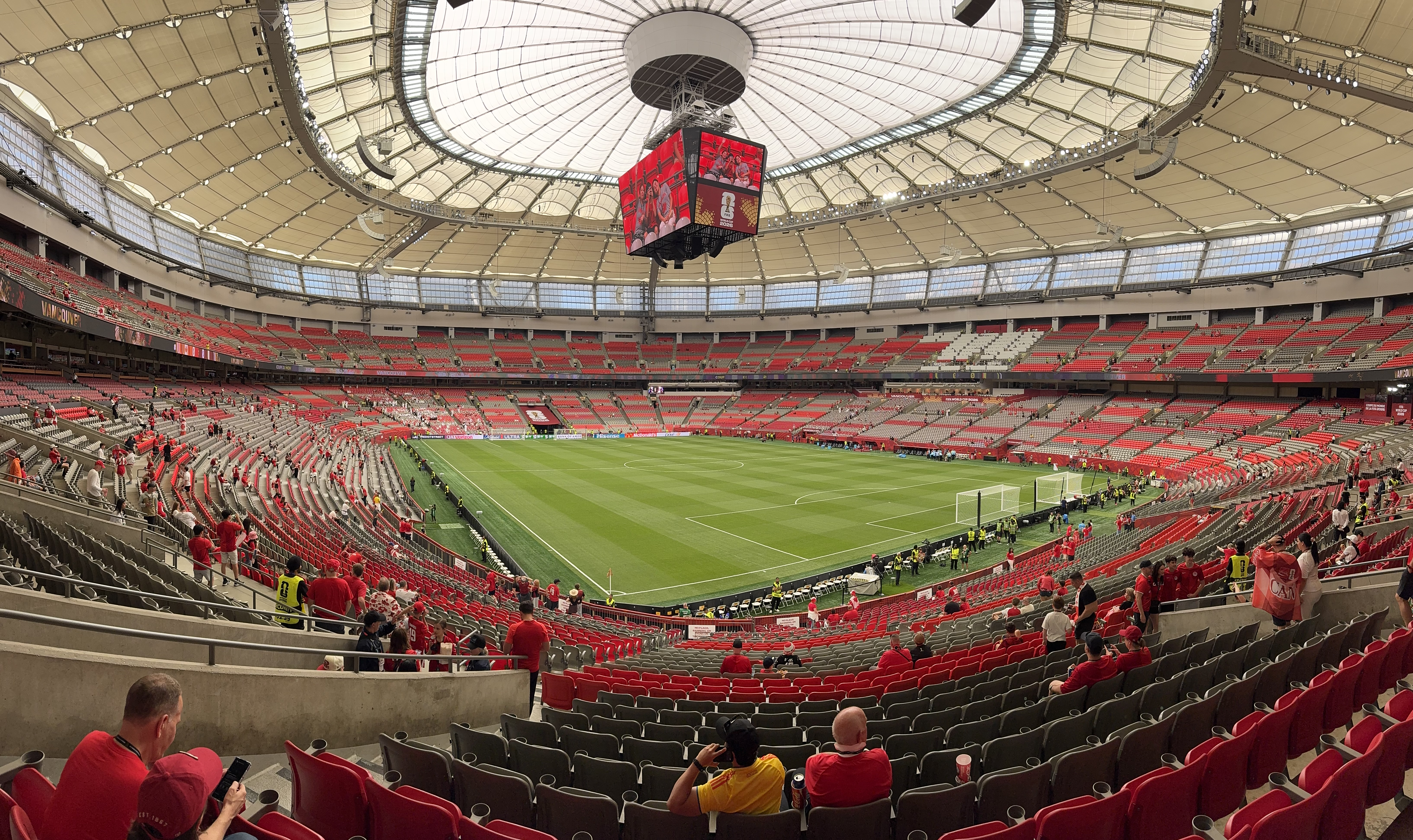
- Interior view prior to a World Cup soccer match in June 2026

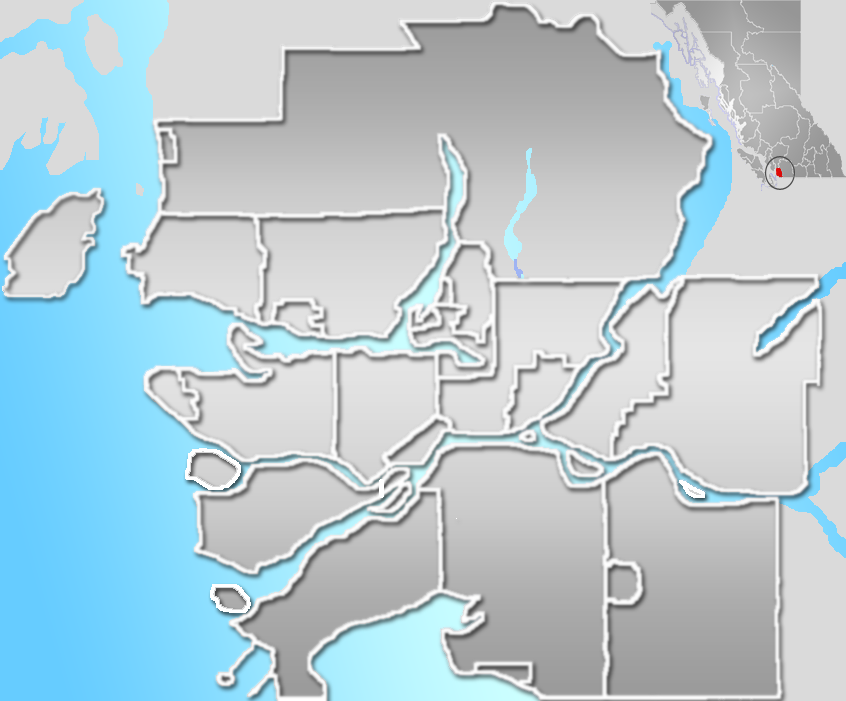
- Location in Vancouver Location in the Vancouver metro area Location in British Columbia Location in Canada
- Former names: BC Place Vancouver (2026 FIFA World Cup)
- Address: 777 Pacific Boulevard
- Location: Vancouver, British Columbia, Canada
- Coordinates: 49°16′36″N 123°6′43″W
- Owner: Province of British Columbia
- Operator: BC Pavilion Corporation (PavCo)
- Capacity: 54,500; 52,497 (2026 FIFA World Cup); 27,695 (lower bowl); 22,120 (MLS)
- Executive suites: 50
- Roof: Retractable
- Surface: FieldTurf
- Record attendance: 65,061 (September 2, 2023, Ed Sheeran, +–=÷× Tour)
- Public transit: Stadium–Chinatown Main Street–Science World (2026 FIFA World Cup); Yaletown–Roundhouse

Construction
- Opened: June 19, 1983; 43 years ago
- Renovated: 2009 (interior); 2011 (exterior and interior)
- Cost: CA$356 million: Original – $126.1 million; ($356 million in 2025 dollars); Renovation – $514 million; ($704 million in 2025 dollars)
- Architects: Studio Phillips Barratt; Stantec Architecture (renovation)

Tenants
- BC Lions (CFL) (1983–present); Vancouver Whitecaps FC (MLS) (2011–present); Vancouver Whitecaps (NASL) (1983–1984); Vancouver Nighthawks (WBL) (1988); Canada men's national soccer team (intermittent); Canada women's national soccer team (intermittent)

Website
- bcplace.com

BC Place is a multi-purpose stadium in Vancouver, British Columbia, Canada. Located at the north side of False Creek, it is owned and operated by the BC Pavilion Corporation (PavCo), a Crown corporation of the province.

The venue is currently the home of the BC Lions of the Canadian Football League (CFL), Vancouver Whitecaps FC of Major League Soccer (MLS), the annual Canada Sevens (part of the World Rugby Sevens Series), as well as the BC Sports Hall of Fame.

Opened on June 19, 1983, BC Place was originally an indoor structure with an air-supported roof, the world's largest at the time. Following the 2010 Winter Olympics, it was closed for 16 months as part of an extensive revitalization, the centrepiece of which was replacing the inflatable roof with a retractable roof supported by cables. Once construction was completed, the stadium's new roof was also the largest of its type.

BC Place served as the Olympic stadium for the 2010 Winter Olympics and Paralympics. The stadium has also been used for international soccer tournaments, including the 2012 CONCACAF Women's Olympic Qualifying Tournament and the 2015 FIFA Women's World Cup, where it hosted the final match. BC Place hosted seven matches during the 2026 FIFA World Cup, including two in the knockout stage.

== History ==
=== Opening and 20th century ===
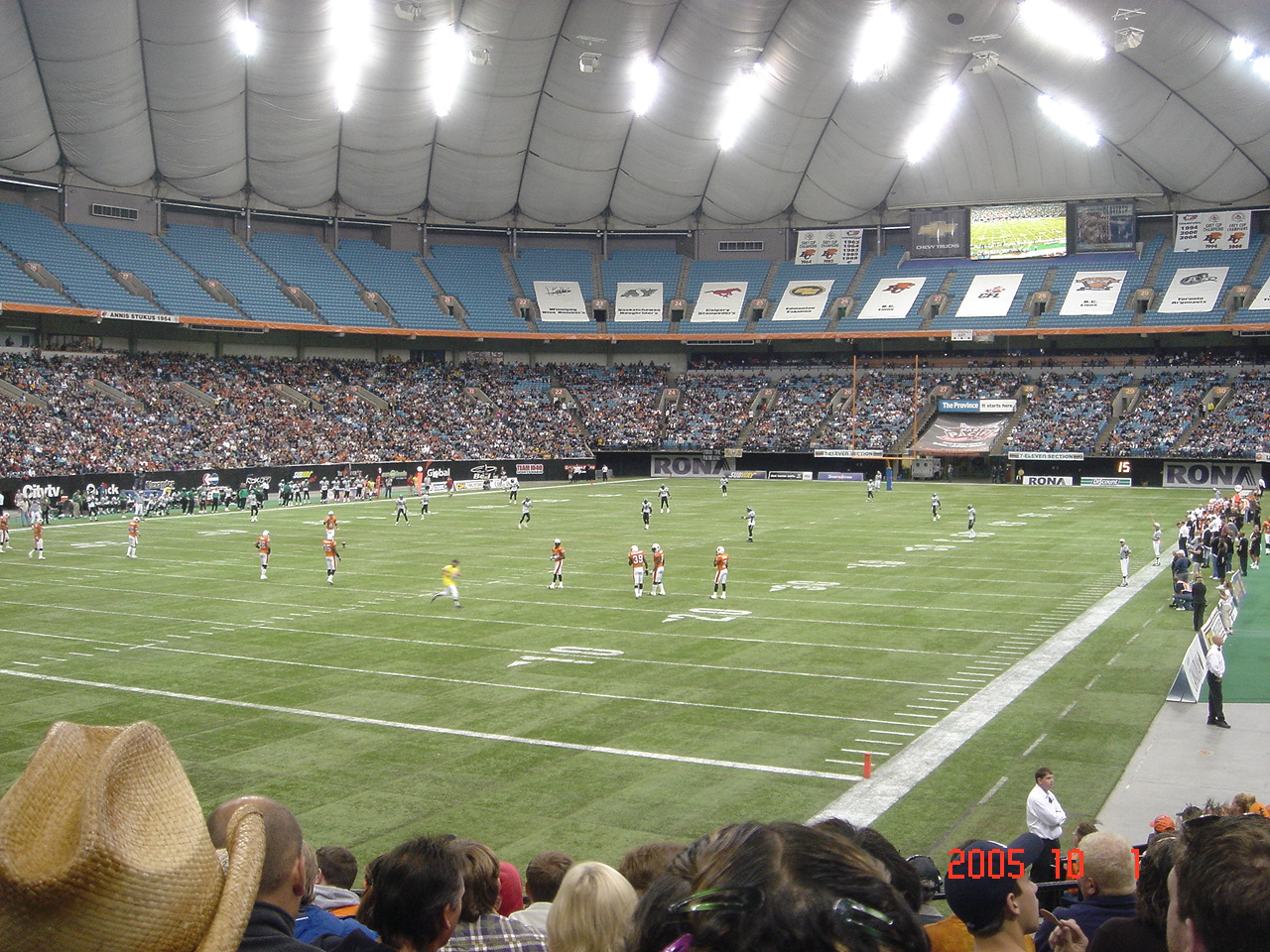
Interior view of BC Place under its original roof in 2005

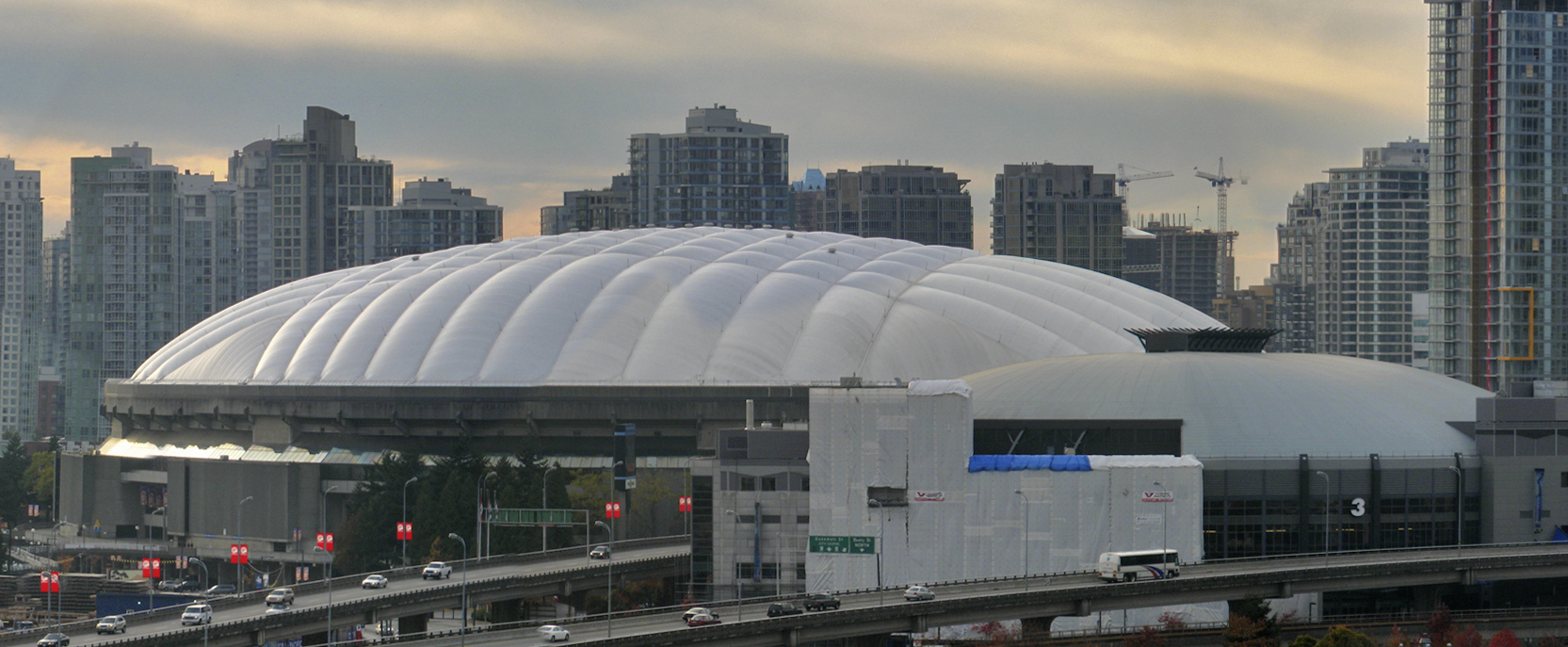
Exterior view of BC Place with its original roof, 2006

Construction of the stadium started in February of 1981, with Dillingham Construction contracted to build the stadium, designed by architecture firm Studio Phillips Barratt, Ltd. BC Place was built as part of the preparations for the 1986 World's Fair, Expo 86. Upon its completion in 1983, the stadium, designed by structural engineers Geiger Berger Associates, was the world's largest air-supported domed stadium until May 4, 2010, when it was deflated for the last time in preparation for the erection of its new retractable roof. Its original air-supported design was similar to the Hubert H. Humphrey Metrodome in Minneapolis, Minnesota, which later stored pieces of the roof for reuse.

The stadium held its grand opening 43 years ago on June 19, 1983. The first major event came the next day, when the Vancouver Whitecaps hosted the Seattle Sounders in a Monday night North American Soccer League (NASL) game with attendance announced at 60,342. On June 23, the BC Lions played their first game at the new stadium, a preseason 41–19 victory against the Calgary Stampeders with 53,472 in attendance. A month later on July 24, 41,810 saw the Lions defeat the Saskatchewan Roughriders 44–28 in the first CFL regular season game at BC Place. The venue hosted the Soccer Bowl '83 and the 1983 Grey Cup game later that year.

On September 18, 1984, Pope John Paul II addressed an over-capacity crowd of 60,000 for "A Celebration of Life". The celebration was part of the papal visit to the Archdiocese of Vancouver, and was one of the most heavily attended events in the stadium. The Pope's Celebration of Life was followed a few months later by the Billy Graham Crusade, which drew similar numbers for eight nights.

BC Place hosted the opening and closing ceremonies of the 1986 World Exposition on Transportation and Communication (Expo '86). Accepting an invitation by the Province of British Columbia, the Prince and Princess of Wales presided over the opening ceremonies of the World's Fair on May 2, 1986. In 1987, an exhibition match of Australian rules football was played at the stadium and drew a crowd of 32,789 – a record for the largest AFL/VFL crowd outside of Australia. The stadium also hosted a National Football League (NFL) exhibition game in 1998 when the San Francisco 49ers defeated the Seattle Seahawks 24–21 in the American Bowl with 45,000 in attendance.

=== 2007 roof deflation ===
On January 5, 2007, snow accumulated on the air-supported Teflon Fibreglass roof, despite strict zero accumulation of ice guidelines and ice accumulation structural warnings. The accumulation caused a tear in the roof's ETFE-coated fabric close to Gate G on the south side where the roof meets the top of the concrete bowl. The tear grew quickly as air escaped through it, whereupon maintenance staff performed an intentional, controlled deflation to protect the integrity of the roof's intact fabric panels. As it was designed to do, the deflated roof rested on its steel support cables 6 metres (20 ft) above the seating and the field. Normally, the roof had a rise of 27 metres (90 ft) above the top of the bowl when inflated. No one was injured during the incident, although rain and melted snow flooded the bowl and subsequently had to be pumped out.

An independent report indicated that an accidental rapid pressurization combined with lightly gusting wind and a location of previously undetected damage caused the tear. The damaged panel was replaced with a temporary one on January 19 and the roof was re-inflated. The BC Contractors Association held an exhibition in the stadium over the week of January 23, during which the roof leaked in several places when it rained. The temporary panel was successfully replaced with a permanent one in June 2007, just prior to the start of the 2007 CFL season.

=== Renovation and roof replacement ===
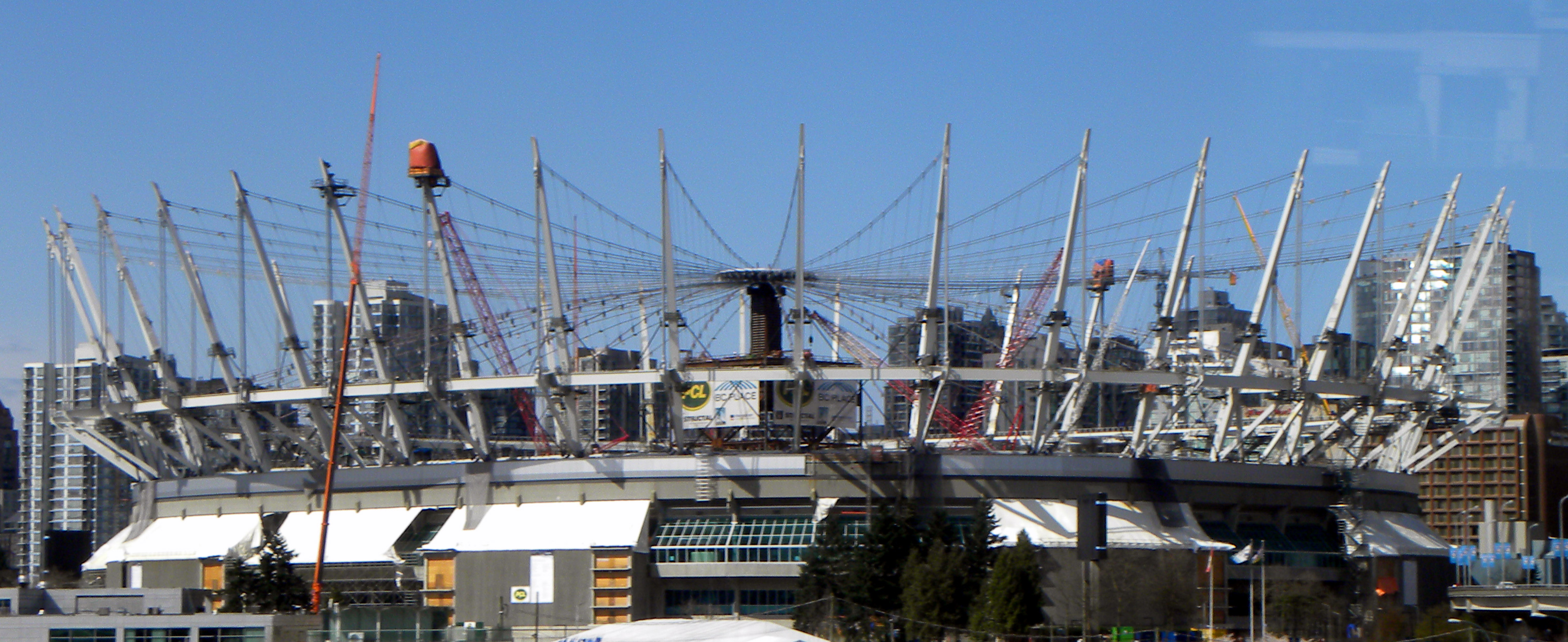
Renovation works at BC Place, including the construction of the retractable roof, viewed in April 2011

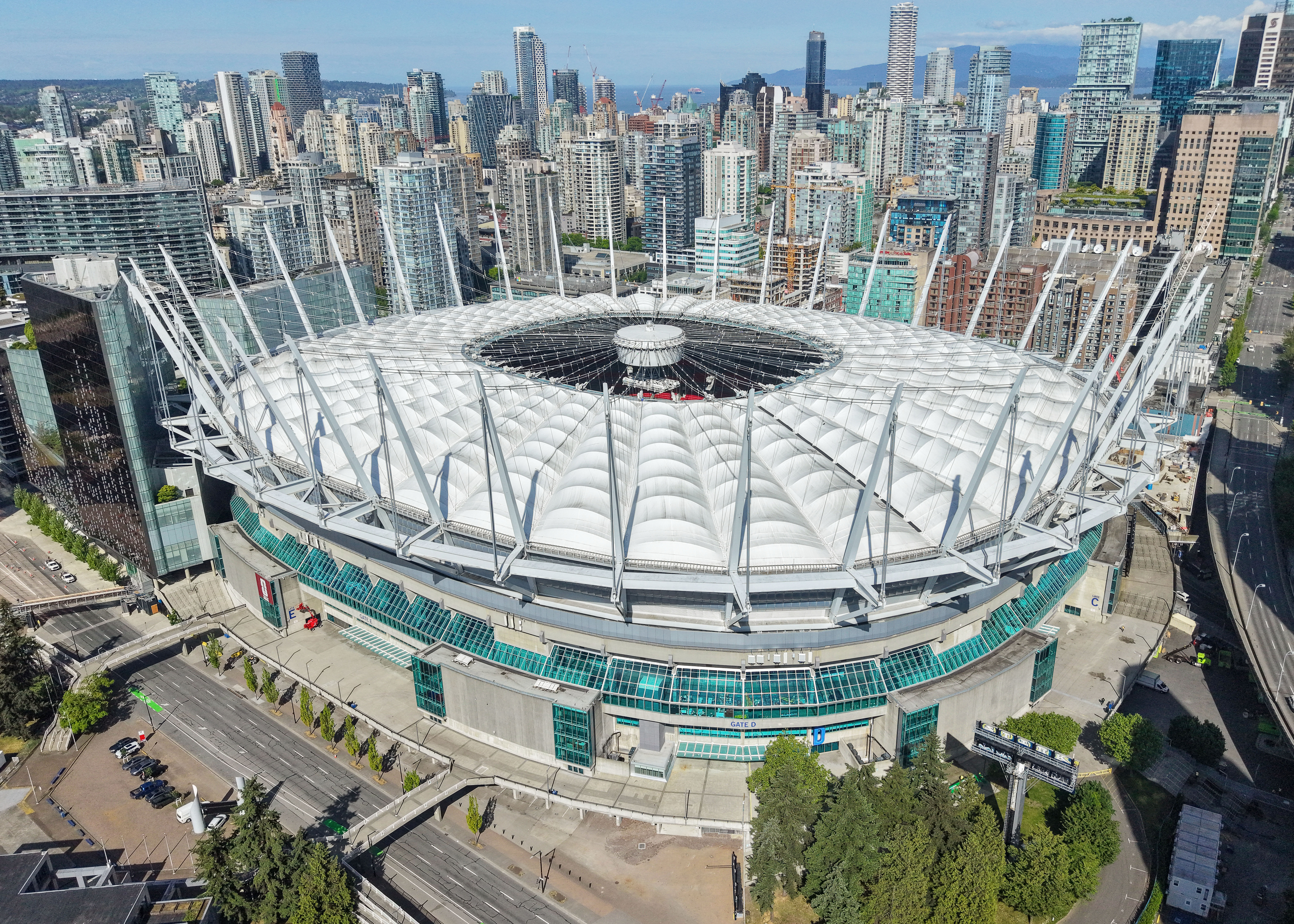
Exterior view of the stadium after its renovation, May 2026

On May 16, 2008, it was announced that over $150 million in major renovations would be carried out on BC Place Stadium. The work was done in two phases. The first phase involved upgrades to seating, washrooms, concessions, and luxury suites, as well as the reinforcement of the existing ring beam at the top of the building and was completed in October 2009, in time for the 2010 Winter Olympics.

Work on the retractable roof began in May 2010, with PCL Westcoast Constructors Inc. contracted to construct the roof designed by architecture firm Stantec Architecture Ltd. and structural engineering firm Geiger Engineers, with Schlaich Bergermann & Partner serving as consulting engineers and Genivar, Inc. acting as services engineers. Geiger also designed the stadium's new centre-hung scoreboard. The roof's construction began immediately after the completion of the 2010 Winter Paralympics and the final deflation of the air-supported roof. The official budget for the completed Phase 1 upgrades plus the revitalization project was $514 million. The new roof, a cable-supported retractable roof system first used with the Commerzbank-Arena in Frankfurt, Germany, is the largest of its kind. The opening measures 100 by 85 metres (109 by 93 yd), the same size as the field below. The fabric roof retracts into and is hidden by a pod in the centre of the opening, above the suspended videoboard.

The updated stadium also features the second largest centre-hung high definition scoreboard in North America, after the one in AT&T Stadium. In addition, a new artificial turf developed by Polytan was installed at an estimated cost of $1.2 million. It is designed to achieve FIFA 2-star certification, the highest rating possible. The soccer pitch is 117 by 75 yards (107 by 69 m).

TSN analyst and former CFL player Chris Schultz praised both the design and engineering of the new stadium. Columnist Brian Hutchinson has praised the renovations for significantly improving the acoustics, and providing a bright and airy feel to the stadium. These were aspects that were missing in its previous air-supported roof incarnation, as well as the Montreal Olympic Stadium and the Rogers Centre (formerly SkyDome).

The artificial turf installed between September 2011 and April 2015 drew criticism, notably its lacklustre characteristics for playing professional level soccer. A new artificial turf was installed in May 2015, prior to the FIFA Women's World Cup Canada 2015. The total cost of the turf upgrade was $1.327 million, with Canada Soccer and Rugby Canada contributing $500,000 CDN to the project. Liam Middleton, Canada's Rugby Sevens coach, stated that the new surface was "better than some natural grass surfaces they've played on."

==== Summary of renovations ====
- New retractable roof is the largest cable supported retractable roof in the world.
- Revolving doors replaced with clear glass doors, which allows the stadium to be accessed much more easily.
- Old brown glass around building replaced with light green glass which lets more light in and makes stadium brighter.
- BC Lions locker room completely expanded and refurbished: Old lockers were taken out, sanded down, refinished, and put back in. New cubicles were also put in with individual lighting for players. Locker room also sports a new floor called "sport floor".
- New synthetic turf, called Polytan LigaTurf RS+, was installed as the new playing surface. Turf has a 1 1/4 inches (32 mm) thick shock pad underneath the turf and special eco-friendly BionPro infill.
- A centre-hung high-definition scoreboard measuring 68 by 38 feet (21 m × 12 m).
- Around the stadium is a new 51 inches (1.3 m) electronic ribbon board, with a circumference of 2,200 feet (670 m).
- Added 1,140 new HDTV screens. Screens work through a system called Stadium Vision. Each screen runs on a separate video source, allowing menu boards at concourse concession stands to show game updates to fans as they order from concession stands.
- All concourses widened and refurbished.
- Added 140 additional portable concession stands. Storage of food and supplies will be in concession stands.
- 50 fully refurbished private suites and 1,300 newly refurbished premium Club Seats.
- Wheel chair seating now at every price point and level of the stadium.
- New upgraded washrooms, and access ramps with new lighting.
- New state of the art sound system.
- New wider seats: seats or 20 inches (51 cm) wide with cup holders on every seat.
- New sport lighting in stadium: 10% of lighting replaced by hot strip lighting, which gives instant on and off.

=== Post-renovation ===
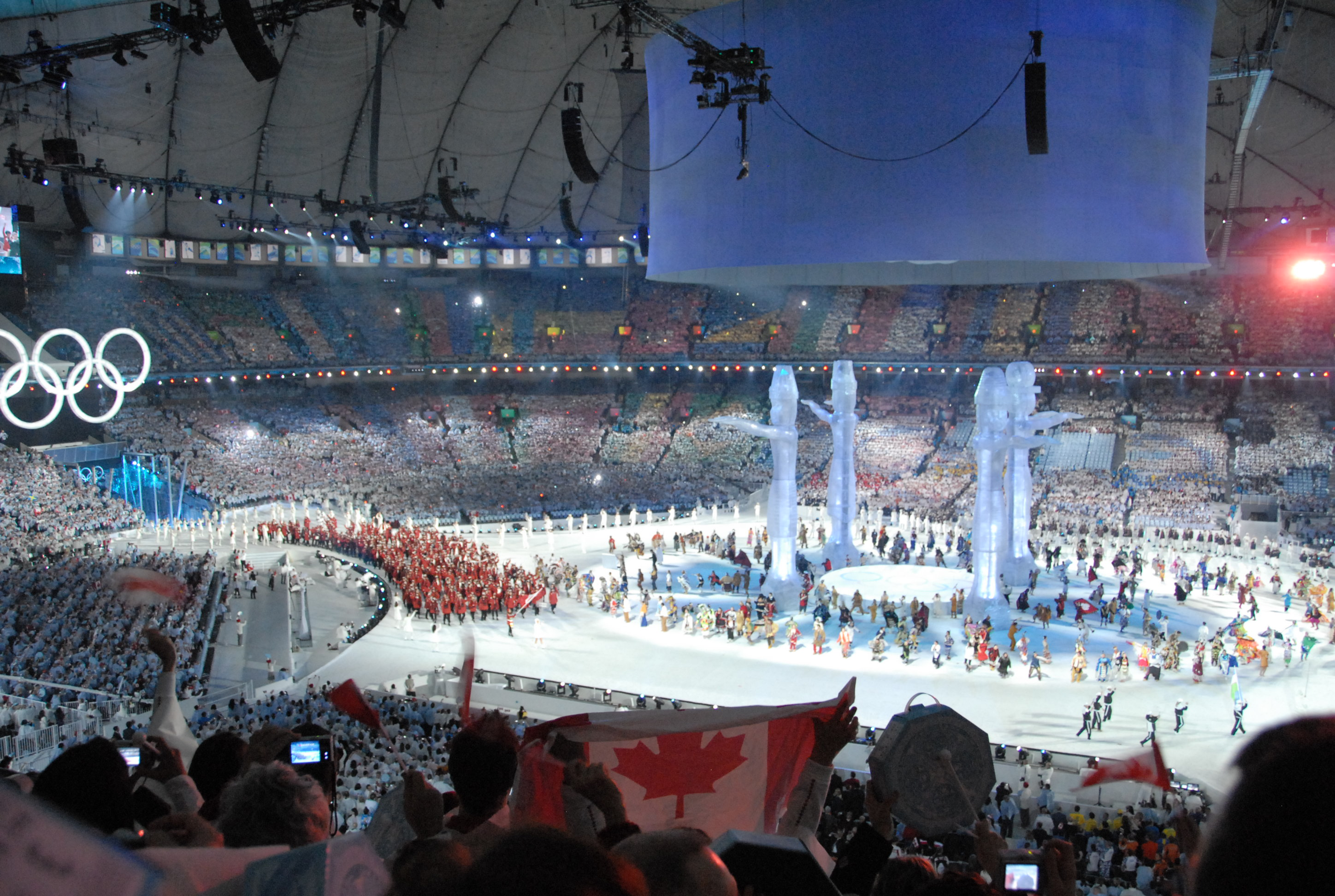
BC Place during the opening ceremony of the 2010 Winter Olympics

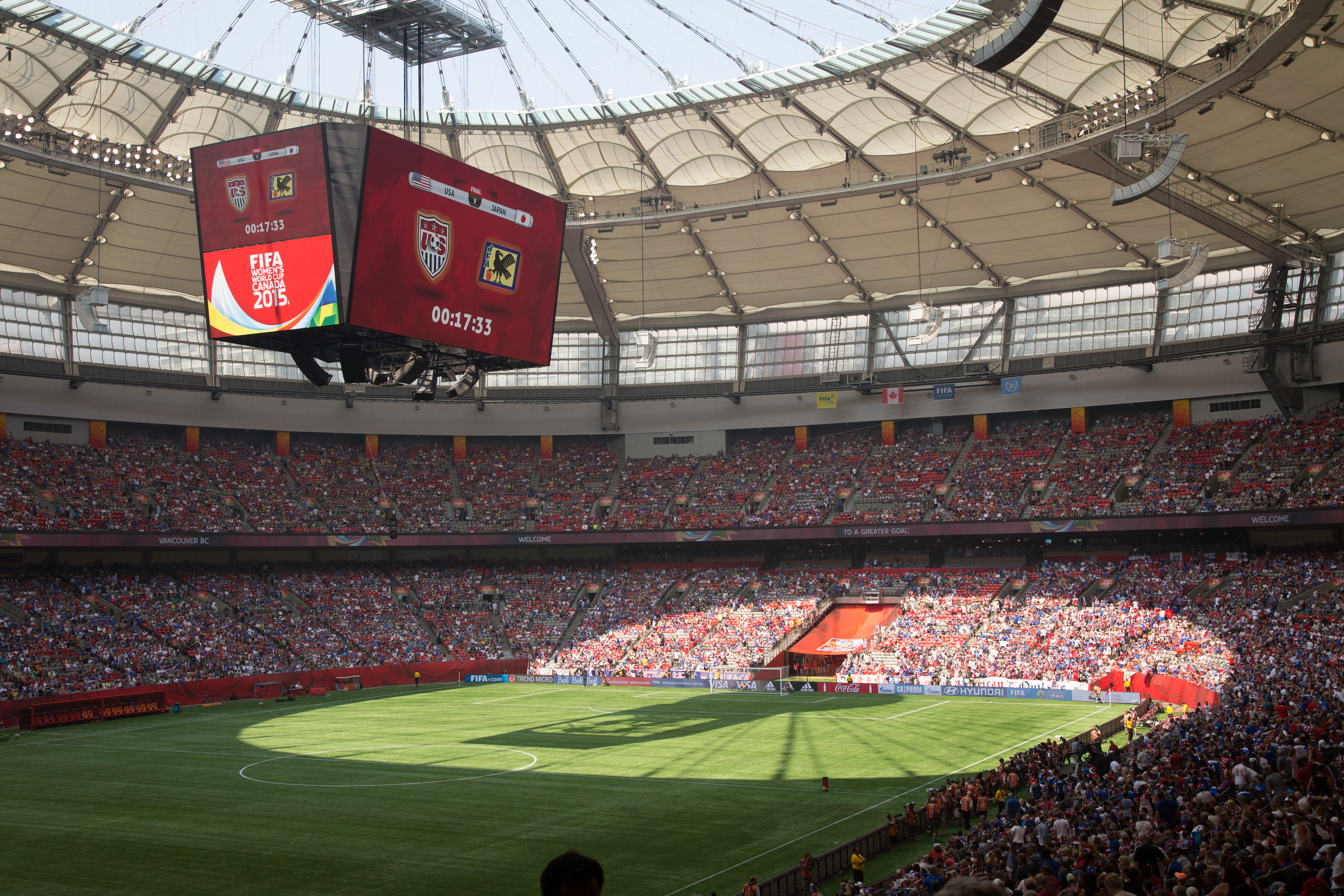
Scene inside BC Place prior to the start of the 2015 FIFA Women's World Cup Final

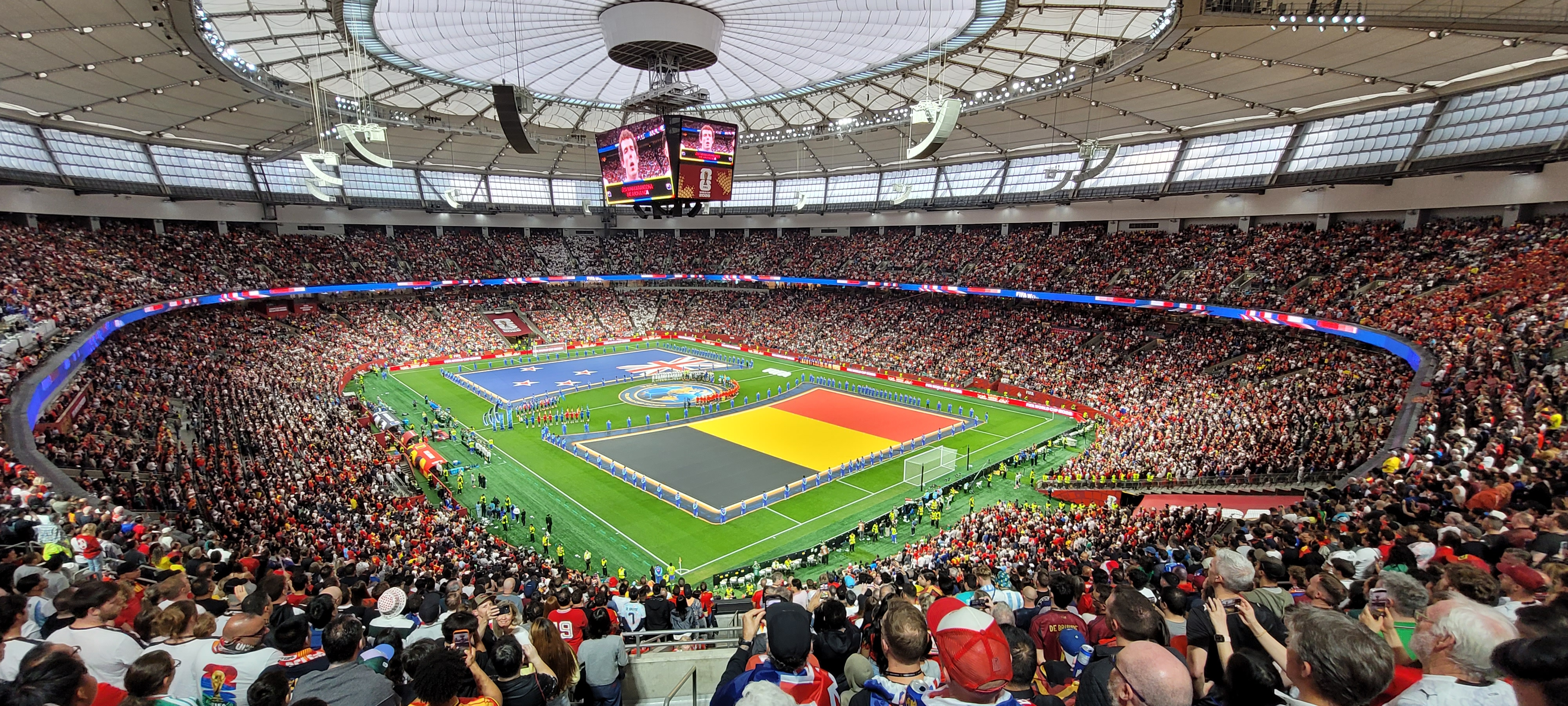
Scene inside BC Place prior to the start of the 2026 FIFA World Cup Match 64, New Zealand v Belgium

The opening and closing ceremonies of the XXI Olympic Winter Games and the opening ceremonies of the X Paralympic Winter Games were also held in BC Place Stadium in February and March 2010, respectively. The stadium was the first air-supported structure and 24th venue to host the opening ceremonies of the Winter Olympics. It was also both the third CFL venue and the third Canadian venue to have served as an Olympic Stadium, after Montreal's Olympic Stadium and Calgary's McMahon Stadium.

The 47th Vanier Cup was the first Canadian university football championship paired with the Grey Cup Festival and played on November 25, 2011, between the McMaster Marauders and Laval Rouge et Or in front of 24,935. Nicknamed "Best Game... Ever", it is widely regarded as one of the most exciting Canadian football games of all time with McMaster winning 41–38 in double overtime. It was the first championship played in the newly renovated facility.

The 2012 CONCACAF Women's Olympic Qualifying Tournament final between the United States and Canada played at the stadium was the highest attendance for a women's CONCACAF Olympic Qualifying game with 25,427 people in attendance.

The 2014 NHL Heritage Classic took place March 2, 2014, in BC Place, with the Ottawa Senators facing off against the home team Vancouver Canucks. It was the first NHL game to be played in a retractable roof stadium.

BC Place hosted its second major international sports competition, the 2015 FIFA Women's World Cup. Five group stage matches, two round of 16 matches, and one quarter-final were held in the stadium during June 2015, and the Final between Japan and the United States was played here on July 5, 2015. The Canada women's national team played Australia at BC Place on December 5, 2023, as part of a farewell tour for Christine Sinclair. The stadium was temporarily renamed to Christine Sinclair Place in her honor.

The stadium hosted round six of the HSBC World Rugby Sevens Series 2015–16 series.

A new overall attendance record was set on September 2, 2023, with 65,061 people attending an Ed Sheeran concert, surpassing the previous record of 63,803 set by a U2 concert in 2009.

In April 2024, Diljit Dosanjh became the first Punjabi artist to sell out BC Place.

On December 6, 7, and 8, 2024, BC Place hosted the final three shows of Taylor Swift's The Eras Tour.

In 2023, a naming rights partnership saw the field renamed to the "Save-on-Foods Field at BC Place".

Before the 2026 FIFA World Cup, BC Place saw minor renovations, including new hospitality spaces.

On June 18, 2026, Canada won its first ever FIFA World Cup match at the stadium, when the side defeated Qatar 6–0, in front of 52,497 fans.

== Tenants ==
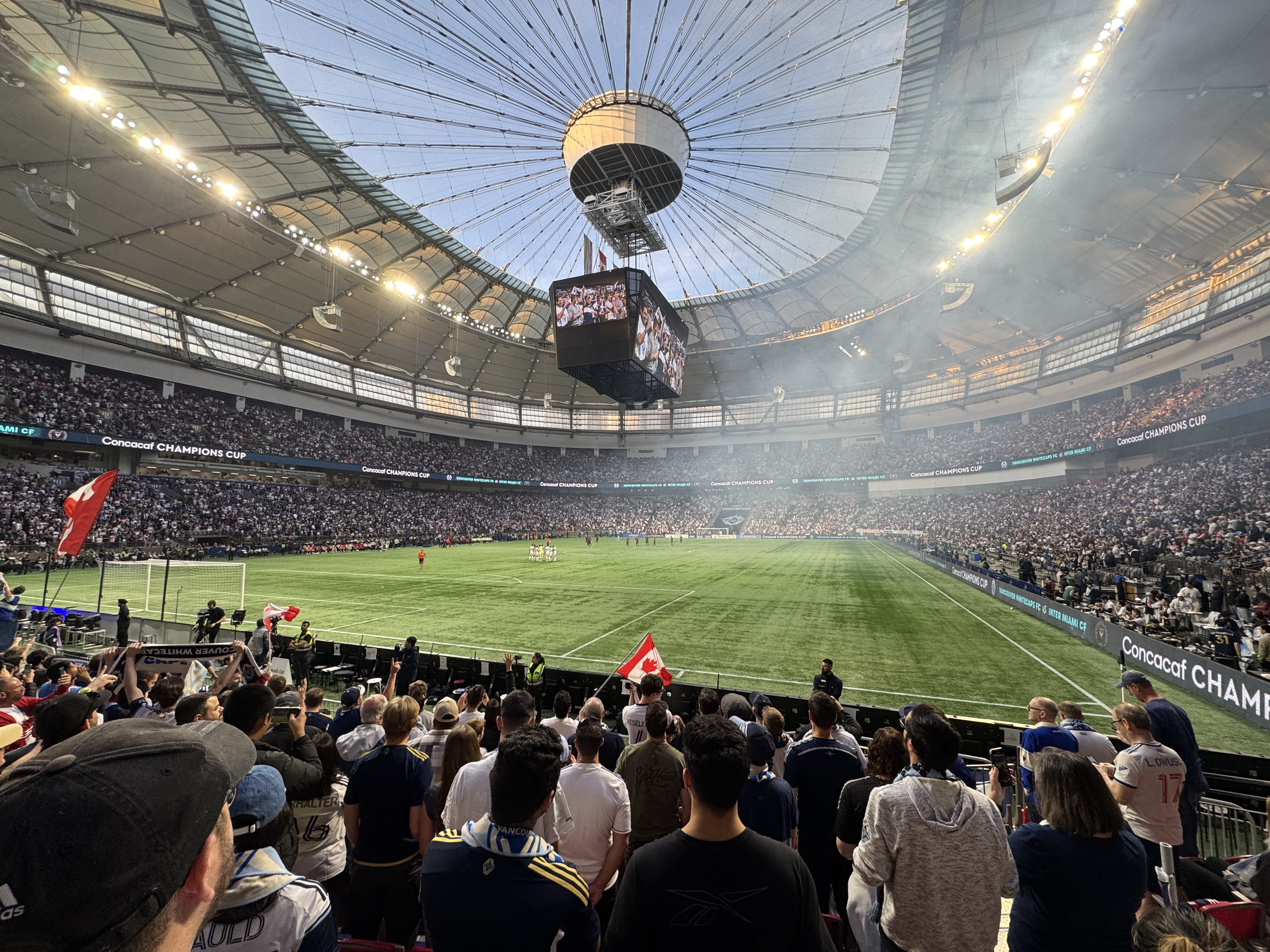
Interior scene at BC Place during a 2025 CONCACAF Champions Cup match between Vancouver Whitecaps FC and Inter Miami CF

BC Place's main sports tenants are the BC Lions of the Canadian Football League (CFL) and Vancouver Whitecaps FC of Major League Soccer (MLS). The Vancouver Nighthawks, a member of the World Basketball League, played the 1988 season at BC Place.

=== Canadian football ===
The Lions have played at BC Place since it opened in 1983 and had a record attendance of 59,478 for three games in 1985 and 1986. When it was built, the floor of BC Place was too small to accommodate a full-sized CFL regulation field. As a result, BC Place became the first CFL stadium to use a 20-yard end zone instead of the regulation 25-yard end zone then in use. Although controversial at first, the smaller end zone proved highly popular with players and was adopted league-wide in 1986.

The stadium has hosted the CFL's championship game, the Grey Cup, ten times: in 1983, 1986, 1987, 1990, 1994, 1999, 2005, 2011, 2014, and 2024. Notable was the 1994 championship, in which the hometown BC Lions defeated the U.S. expansion team the Baltimore Football Club on a last-second field goal by Lui Passaglia, preventing the Grey Cup trophy from leaving Canada (Baltimore would win the Grey Cup the following year). The stadium hosted the 99th Grey Cup in 2011 after the new roof was completed (this Grey Cup game was also won by the BC Lions at home).

=== Soccer ===
Several incarnations of the Whitecaps have played at BC Place. The original Vancouver Whitecaps of the North American Soccer League (NASL) played at the stadium from 1983 to 1984, when the team folded. The team hosted the first sporting event at BC Place, a regular season match against the Seattle Sounders on June 20, 1983, which drew 60,342 spectators. Soccer Bowl '83 was also held at BC Place, where the Tulsa Roughnecks defeated the Toronto Blizzard 2–0 in front of 53,326 spectators.

The stadium was also used for exhibition matches as well as Canada national team fixtures during the 1980s and 1990s. The second incarnation of the Whitecaps, initially named the Vancouver 86ers, played exhibition matches at BC Place in 1991 and 1992 before returning for regular season games in 1995 during renovations to Swangard Stadium. On November 7, 2007, the Whitecaps hosted the LA Galaxy for an exhibition match that drew 48,172 spectators—mainly attracted by the appearance of David Beckham.

On August 21, 2021, the Whitecaps played their first home game at BC Place since the COVID-19 pandemic after being forced to stay in the United States for the 2020 season and the first half of the 2021 season. They won 2–1 against Los Angeles FC.

After the Whitecaps joined MLS and moved into the renovated BC Place, the team only sold seats in the lower bowl. They drew a record of 27,683 spectators for a regular season match against Seattle Sounders FC in 2018 without opening the upper bowl. The restriction was lifted for a 2023 playoff match against Los Angeles FC on November 5, 2023; the match had 30,204 spectators. The team set their new MLS attendance record on May 25, 2024, with 51,035 spectators during a regular season match against Inter Miami CF who had signed star player Lionel Messi the year prior. The team later broke their MLS-era record for attendance with 53,837 spectators at their 2025 CONCACAF Champions Cup semifinal match against Miami on April 24, 2025. On November 22, 2025, the team set their highest ever MLS attendance record with 53,957 fans during the 2025 MLS Cup playoffs Western Conference semifinals against Los Angeles FC.

On April 16, 2025, BC Place hosted the opening match for the Northern Super League, Canada's top women's soccer league between the hometown Vancouver Rise FC and Calgary Wild FC. The Rise won 1–0 in front of 14,018 spectators with the first goal scored by Quinn.

==== 2015 FIFA Women's World Cup ====
| Date | Team #1 | Result | Team #2 | Round | Attendance |
|---|---|---|---|---|---|
| June 8, 2015 | Cameroon | 6–0 | Ecuador | Group C | 25,942 |
| June 8, 2015 | Japan | 1–0 | Switzerland | Group C | 25,942 |
| June 12, 2015 | Switzerland | 10–1 | Ecuador | Group C | 31,441 |
| June 12, 2015 | Japan | 2–1 | Cameroon | Group C | 31,441 |
| June 16, 2015 | Nigeria | 0–1 | United States | Group D | 52,193 |
| June 21, 2015 | Canada | 1–0 | Switzerland | Round of 16 | 53,855 |
| June 23, 2015 | Japan | 2–1 | Netherlands | Round of 16 | 28,717 |
| June 27, 2015 | England | 2–1 | Canada | Quarterfinal | 54,027 |
| July 5, 2015 | United States | 5–2 | Japan | Final | 54,027 |

==== 2025 CONCACAF Gold Cup ====
| Date | Team #1 | Result | Team #2 | Round | Attendance |
|---|---|---|---|---|---|
| June 17, 2025 | Canada | 6–0 | Honduras | Group B | 24,286 |

==== 2026 FIFA World Cup ====
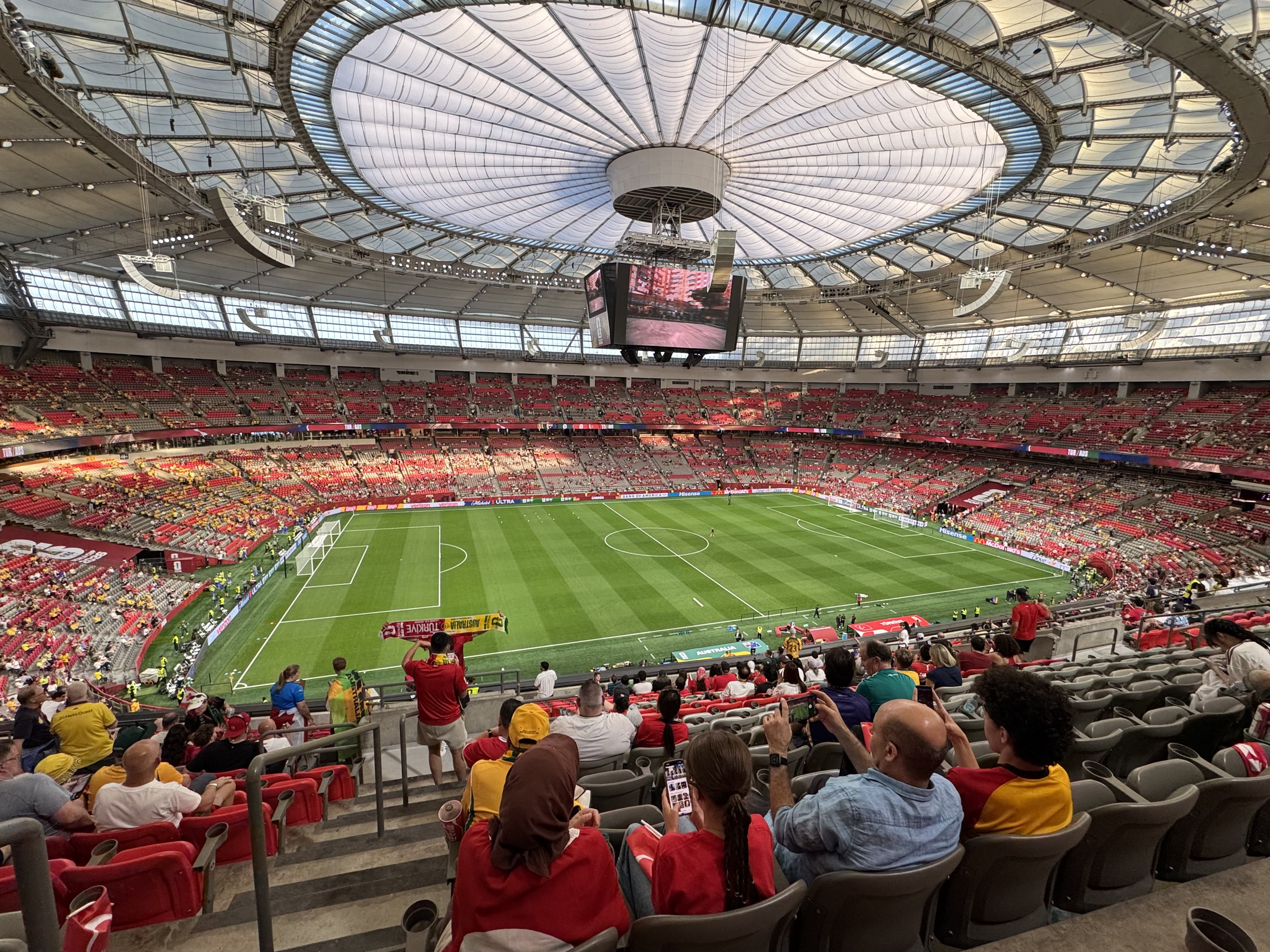
Inside the stadium prior to the Australia vs Turkey match of the 2026 FIFA World Cup

BC Place hosted seven matches during the 2026 FIFA World Cup as one of two Canadian venues alongside BMO Field in Toronto. Among them were five group stage matches, including two home games for the Canada national team on June 18 and 24, and two knockout stage matches: one in the round of 32 and another in the round of 16. Both knockout matches would have featured Canada if they won Group B, but a 2–1 defeat to Switzerland meant they failed to top the group. During the tournament, the stadium was temporarily known as "BC Place Vancouver".

The provincial government estimated that it would cost $240–260 million to stage, plan, and host the matches at BC Place. The BC Sports Hall of Fame was converted into a media centre for the World Cup.

| Date | Time (UTC−7) | Team #1 | Result | Team #2 | Round | Attendance |
|---|---|---|---|---|---|---|
| June 13, 2026 | 21:00 | Australia | 2–0 | Turkey | Group D | 52,497 |
| June 18, 2026 | 15:00 | Canada | 6–0 | Qatar | Group B | 52,497 |
| June 21, 2026 | 18:00 | New Zealand | 1–3 | Egypt | Group G | 52,497 |
| June 24, 2026 | 12:00 | Switzerland | 2–1 | Canada | Group B | 52,497 |
| June 26, 2026 | 20:00 | New Zealand | 1–5 | Belgium | Group G | 52,497 |
| July 2, 2026 | 20:00 | Switzerland | 2–0 | Algeria | Round of 32 | 52,497 |
| July 7, 2026 | 13:00 | Switzerland | 0–0 (a.e.t.) (4–3 p) | Colombia | Round of 16 | 52,497 |

=== Baseball ===
BC Place can also be used in a baseball configuration to attract a future Major League Baseball (MLB) franchise. It can accommodate a baseball diamond with retractable seating sections making room for right field. The Vancouver Canadians of the Triple-A Pacific Coast League played several series of games there between 1984 and 1988, including games 1 and 2 of the 1985 league championship series. Numerous MLB spring training games were also played, including in 1984 (Toronto Blue Jays and Milwaukee Brewers), 1986 (Chicago Cubs, San Diego Padres, Montreal Expos and Seattle Mariners), 1993 (Toronto, Seattle, Milwaukee and Detroit Tigers) and 1994 MLB season (Toronto, Seattle, Montreal and Colorado Rockies). The Mariners explored plans to play regular season games at BC Place in the mid-1990s, but were unable to receive approval from MLB.

In the mid-1990s, the stadium was planned to be the home of the yet-to-be named Vancouver team, a charter franchise of the United League (UL) which was planned to be a third league of MLB; it never came to fruition.

=== Rugby union ===
The Canadian national rugby union team has played several matches at BC Place since 2016.

| Date | Competition | Home | Score | Away | Attendance | Ref. |
|---|---|---|---|---|---|---|
| June 11, 2016 | Mid-year international | Canada | 22–26 | Japan | 10,250 | |
| November 3, 2017 | End-of-year international | Canada | 9–51 | Māori All Blacks | 29,480 | |
| January 27, 2018 | Rugby World Cup qualification match Americas Rugby Championship | Canada | 29–38 | Uruguay | 16,132 | |
| September 7, 2019 | Rugby World Cup warm-up match | Canada | 15–20 | United States | N/A | |
| October 30, 2020 | End-of-year internationals | Canada | cancelled | United States | —N/a | —N/a |
| August 25, 2024 | Pacific Nations Cup | Canada | 28–55 | Japan | N/A | |

=== Cricket ===
BC Place transformed into an all-weather cricket stadium, becoming the first indoor venue in the world to host a 10-over-a-side cricket tournament in 2025 during the newly launched Canada Super60. The first two editions of the tournament have taken place at this venue. Only seats in the lower bowl were opened. The tournament's head of media stated that this was "probably the first high-level competitive cricket of this iteration to be played under the roof. The tournament was criticized due to the short boundaries at BC Place, which was built for football rather than cricket, with straight boundaries only 40 metres (130 ft) from the centre of the field, much shorter than the minimum Twenty20 International regulation of 195 feet (59 m). One wide delivery even bounced over the batter's and wicketkeeper's heads to sail past the boundary on the full. Edges going for sixes were indicative of the distorted balance between batting and bowling; in the final, sixes were scored from almost a third of balls in each team's innings.

== Transportation ==
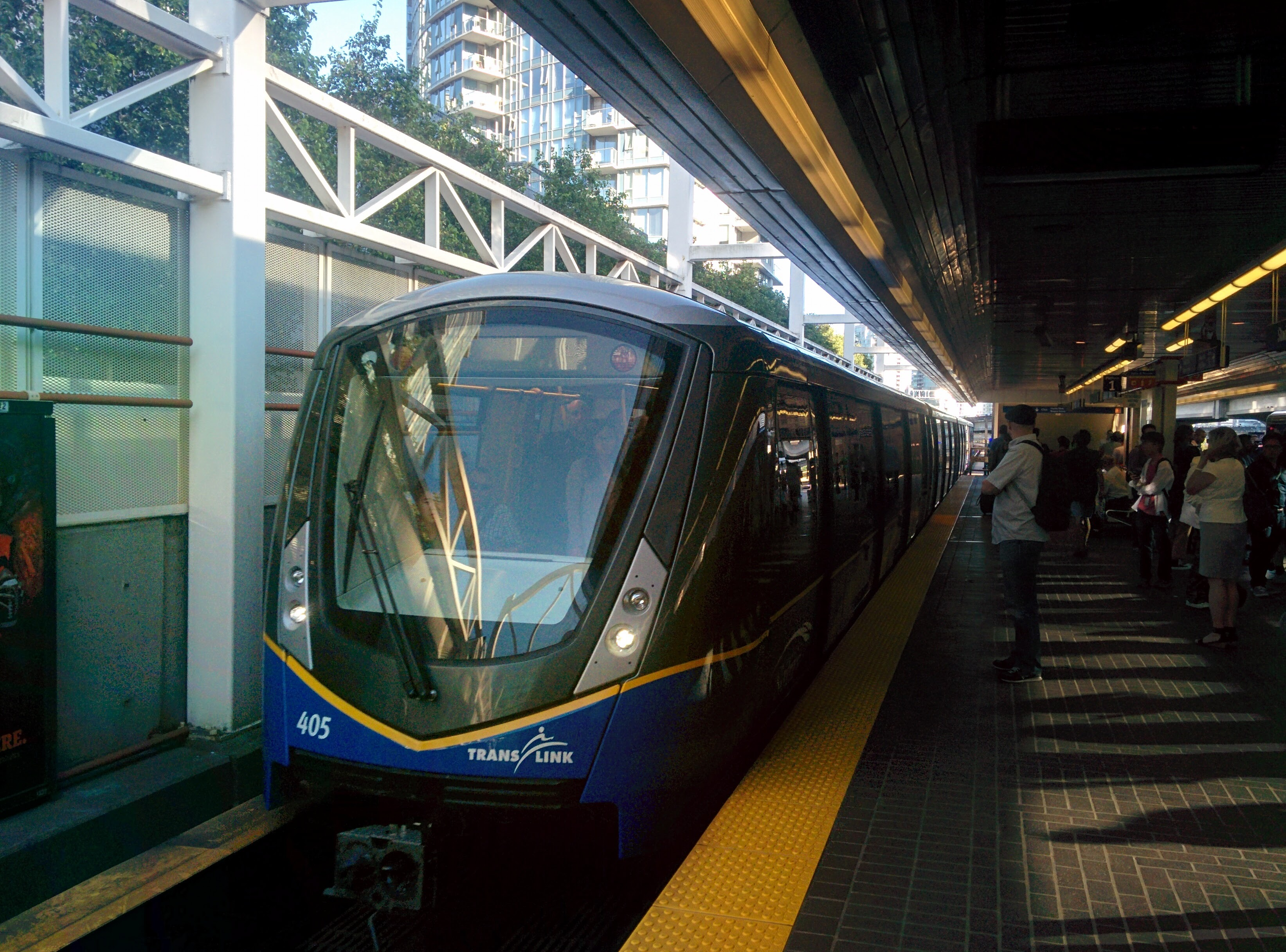
An Expo Line SkyTrain pulling into Stadium–Chinatown station, located adjacent to BC Place

The stadium is served by three SkyTrain (TransLink) stations on two lines: Stadium–Chinatown on the Expo Line to the east, and Yaletown–Roundhouse on the Canada Line to the southwest, with Vancouver City Centre on the Canada Line also accessible from the northwest. TransLink also operates several bus routes that stop near BC Place. The False Creek Ferries and Aquabus also serve the stadium, docking at the nearby Plaza of Nations.

== Accolades ==
- Project of the Year for the 2012 International Stadium Business Awards
- National Council of Structural Engineers Associations' 2012 Outstanding Project Award in the Forensic/Renovation/Retrofit/Rehabilitation Structures category
- One of the 2012 Awards of Excellence presented to GENIVAR and Geiger Engineers by the Association of Consulting Engineering Companies, Canada
- The 2013 ENR Global Best Project Winner for Sports/Entertainment

== See also ==
- List of Canadian Football League stadiums
- List of Major League Soccer stadiums
- List of soccer stadiums in Canada
- Kazimierz Górski National Stadium
