= 1983 Edmonton Eskimos season =

- General manager: Norm Kimball
- Head coach: Pete Kettela, Jackie Parker
- Home stadium: Commonwealth Stadium

Results
- Record: 8–8
- Division place: 3rd, West
- Playoffs: Lost West Semi-Final

The 1983 Edmonton Eskimos finished in third place in the West Division with a 8–8 record.

The Eskimos offense had 472 points for, while the defense had 426 points allowed. Warren Moon finished his career in the CFL in 1983. He was the league's leading passer with 380 completions of 664 attempts for 5,648 yards and 31 touchdowns. He was also named to the West All-Star team, the CFL All-Star team and won the Schenley Most Outstanding Player Award.

== Regular season ==
=== Standings ===
West Division
Pos	Team	Pld	W	L	T	PF	PA	PD	Pts
1	BC Lions (C, Q)	16	11	5	0	477	326	+151	22
2	Winnipeg Blue Bombers (Q)	16	9	7	0	412	402	+10	18
3	Edmonton Eskimos (Q)	16	8	8	0	450	377	+73	16
4	Calgary Stampeders	16	8	8	0	425	378	+47	16
5	Saskatchewan Roughriders	16	5	11	0	360	536	−176	10

Source: "1983 Regular Season Standings". Archived from the original on 2008-08-08.
(C) First round bye; (Q) Qualified for playoffs

=== Schedule ===
Week	Game	Date	Opponent	Results		Venue	Attendance
Week	Game	Date	Opponent	Score	Record	Venue	Attendance

==== Postseason ====
Round	Date	Opponent	Results		Venue	Attendance
Round	Date	Opponent	Score	Record	Venue	Attendance

=== Player stats ===
==== Passing ====
Player	Games Played	Attempts	Completions	Yards	Pct.	Interceptions	Long	Touchdowns
Matt Dunigan	16	26	14	239	53.9	2	54	4
Warren Moon	16	664	380	5648	57.2	19	48	31

==== Rushing ====
Player	Rushes	Yards	Long	Touchdowns
Warren Moon	85	527	25	3

=== Awards and honors ===
- CFL's Most Outstanding Player Award – Warren Moon
- Jeff Nicklin Memorial Trophy – Warren Moon
