= 1985 BC Lions season =

Canadian football team season

- General manager: Bob Ackles
- Head coach: Don Matthews
- Home stadium: BC Place Stadium

Results
- Record: 13–3
- Division place: 1st, West
- Playoffs: Won Grey Cup

Uniform

The 1985 BC Lions season was the 28th season for the team in the Canadian Football League (CFL) and their 32nd overall. The Lions finished in first place in the West Division with a 13–3 record and won the Grey Cup by defeating the Hamilton Tiger-Cats 37–24 in the 73rd Grey Cup game. The win captured the second championship in franchise history and also ended the longest Grey Cup drought for the Lions at 21 years.

== Offseason ==
=== CFL draft ===
Round	Pick	Player	Position	School
1	3	John Ulmer	Defensive end	North Dakota
1	7	Rick Ryan	Defensive back	Weber State
2	14	Bruce Barnett	Defensive back	British Columbia
2	16	Joe Pariselli	Running back	York
3	22	Bob Jedicke	Defensive line	Western Ontario
3	26	Chris Spence	Running back	Simon Fraser
4	34	Kurt Wilchuck	Linebacker	Oregon
5	43	John Moffatt	Wide receiver	Western Ontario
6	52	Chester Krala	Linebacker	Calgary
8	70	John Melvin	Defensive line	British Columbia
9	79	Bob Ros	Tight end	British Columbia

== Preseason ==
Game	Date	Opponent	Results		Venue	Attendance
Game	Date	Opponent	Score	Record	Venue	Attendance
A	Sun, June 9	vs. Calgary Stampeders	W 19–9	1–0	BC Place	29,238
B	Mon, June 17	at Edmonton Eskimos	W 17–16	2–0	Commonwealth Stadium	
C	Fri, June 21	vs. Winnipeg Blue Bombers	L 18–28	2–1	BC Place	26,921
D	Fri, June 28	at Saskatchewan Roughriders	W 21–3	3–1	Taylor Field	19,651

== Regular season ==
=== Season standings ===
West Division
Pos	Team	Pld	W	L	T	PF	PA	PD	Pts
1	BC Lions (C, Q)	16	13	3	0	481	297	+184	26
2	Winnipeg Blue Bombers (Q)	16	12	4	0	500	259	+241	24
3	Edmonton Eskimos (Q)	16	10	6	0	432	373	+59	20
4	Saskatchewan Roughriders	16	5	11	0	320	462	−142	10
5	Calgary Stampeders	16	3	13	0	256	429	−173	6

Source: "CFL.ca - Official Site of the Canadian Football League". Archived from the original on 2009-10-16.
(C) First round bye; (Q) Qualified for playoffs

=== Season schedule ===
Week	Game	Date	Opponent	Results		Venue	Attendance
Week	Game	Date	Opponent	Score	Record	Venue	Attendance
1	1	Sat, July 6	at Hamilton Tiger-Cats	W 42–8	1–0	Ivor Wynne Stadium	13,101
2	2	Sat, July 13	vs. Edmonton Eskimos	W 25–10	2–0	BC Place	38,055
3	3	Sun, July 21	at Calgary Stampeders	W 39–14	3–0	McMahon Stadium	15,769
4	4	Sat, July 27	vs. Montreal Concordes	W 28–15	4–0	BC Place	48,281
5	5	Thurs, Aug 1	at Toronto Argonauts	W 43–18	5–0	Exhibition Stadium	31,276
6	Bye						
7	6	Sat, Aug 17	vs. Calgary Stampeders	L 32–35	5–1	BC Place Stadium	37,462
8	7	Sat, Aug 24	vs. Hamilton Tiger-Cats	W 21–11	6–1	BC Place	34,351
9	8	Fri, Aug 30	at Ottawa Rough Riders	W 18–13	7–1	Lansdowne Park	23,611
10	9	Fri, Sept 6	vs. Toronto Argonauts	W 32–23	8–1	BC Place	40,782
11	Bye						
12	10	Fri, Sept 20	at Montreal Concordes	W 31–20	9–1	Olympic Stadium	24,363
13	11	Sat, Sept 28	vs. Saskatchewan Roughriders	W 33–9	10–1	BC Place	41,618
14	12	Sun, Oct 6	at Winnipeg Blue Bombers	L 26–33	10–2	Winnipeg Stadium	32,946
15	13	Fri, Oct 11	vs. Winnipeg Blue Bombers	L 10–31	10–3	BC Place	59,478
16	14	Sun, Oct 20	at Saskatchewan Roughriders	W 42–18	11–3	Taylor Field	19,940
17	15	Sun, Oct 27	at Edmonton Eskimos	W 42–29	12–3	Commonwealth Stadium	48,193
18	16	Fri, Nov 1	vs. Ottawa Rough Riders	W 17–10	13–3	BC Place	38,661

== Awards and records ==
- CFL's Most Outstanding Player Award – Mervyn Fernandez (WR)
- CFL's Most Outstanding Rookie Award – Mike Gray (DT)
- CFLPA's Most Outstanding Community Service Award – Tyrone Crews (LB)
- CFL's Coach of the Year – Don Matthews
- Jeff Nicklin Memorial Trophy – Mervyn Fernandez (WR)

=== 1985 CFL All-Stars ===
- RB – Keyvan Jenkins, CFL All-Star
- WR – Mervyn Fernandez, CFL All-Star
- OT – John Blain, CFL All-Star
- DT – Mike Gray, CFL All-Star
- DE – James "Quick" Parker, CFL All-Star
- LB – Kevin Konar, CFL All-Star
- DB – Darnell Clash, CFL All-Star

== Playoffs ==
Round	Date	Opponent	Results		Venue	Attendance
Round	Date	Opponent	Score	Record	Venue	Attendance
West Semi-Final	Bye					
West Final	Sun, Nov 17	vs. Winnipeg Blue Bombers	W 42–22	1–0	BC Place	59,478
Grey Cup	Sun, Nov 24	vs. Hamilton Tiger-Cats	W 37–24	2–0	Olympic Stadium	56,723

=== West Final ===
Team	Q1	Q2	Q3	Q4	Total
Winnipeg Blue Bombers	8	8	0	6	22
BC Lions	7	10	22	3	42

=== Grey Cup ===
Team	Q1	Q2	Q3	Q4	Total
BC Lions	10	13	6	8	37
Hamilton Tiger-Cats	0	14	0	10	24

First quarter

BC – TD Armour 84 yard pass from Dewalt (Passaglia convert)
BC – FG Passaglia

Second quarter

BC – FG Passaglia
HAM – TD Ingram 35 yard pass from Hobart (Ruoff convert)
HAM – TD Shepherd 00 yard pass from Hobart (Ruoff convert)
BC – TD Armour 59 yard pass from Dewalt (Passaglia convert)
BC – FG Passaglia

Third quarter
BC – FG Passaglia
BC – FG Passaglia

Fourth quarter

HAM – FG Ruoff
BC – Single Passaglia
BC – TD Sandusky 66 yard pass from Dewalt (Passaglia convert)
HAM – TD Stapler 35 yard pass from Hobart (Ruoff convert)

== Roster ==
1985 BC Lions final roster
Quarterbacks: 11 Tim Cowan; 9 Roy Dewalt; 6 Karlton Watson; Running backs: 23 Keyvan Jenkins; 33 Ryan Potter; 14 Freddie Sims; 20 John Henry White; Receivers: 3 Mark Debrueys; 24 Mervyn Fernandez; 21 John Pankratz; 16 Mike Oxmall; 2 Jim Sandusky	Offensive linemen: 68 John Blain T/G; 69 Rob Petersen T/C; 67 Dennis Guevin T; 61 Bryan Illerbrun T; 54 Glenn Leonhard G; 65 Gerald Roper G; 55 Ian Sinclair G/C; 52 Al Wilson C; Defensive linemen: 77 Mike Gray DT; 99 Nick Hebeler DE; 60 Bennie Jones DT; 90 Rick Klassen DT; 79 Mark Napiorkowski DE; 40 James Parker DE	Linebackers: 91 Tyrone Crews; 35 Eric Emery; 7 Bernie Glier; 37 Glen Jackson; 31 Kevin Konar; 44 John Ulmer; Defensive backs: 12 Bruce Barnett; 10 Melvin Byrd; 1 Darnell Clash; 28 Larry Crawford; 18 Keith Gooch; 32 Andre Jones; 4 Nelson Martin; 17 Kerry Parker	Special teams: 5 Lui Passaglia K/P; Injured list: 8 Ned Armour WR; Italics indicate International player
