= 1985 Calgary Stampeders season =

Canadian football team season

- General manager: Earl Lunsford
- Head coach: Steve Buratto, Bud Riley
- Home stadium: McMahon Stadium

Results
- Record: 3–13
- Division place: 5th, West
- Playoffs: did not qualify

The 1985 Calgary Stampeders finished in fifth place in the West Division with a 3–13 record and failed to make the playoffs.

== Regular season ==
=== Season standings ===
West Division
Pos	Team	Pld	W	L	T	PF	PA	PD	Pts
1	BC Lions (C, Q)	16	13	3	0	481	297	+184	26
2	Winnipeg Blue Bombers (Q)	16	12	4	0	500	259	+241	24
3	Edmonton Eskimos (Q)	16	10	6	0	432	373	+59	20
4	Saskatchewan Roughriders	16	5	11	0	320	462	−142	10
5	Calgary Stampeders	16	3	13	0	256	429	−173	6

Source: "CFL.ca - Official Site of the Canadian Football League". Archived from the original on 2009-10-16.
(C) First round bye; (Q) Qualified for playoffs

=== Season schedule ===
Week	Game	Date	Opponent	Results		Venue	Attendance
Week	Game	Date	Opponent	Score	Record	Venue	Attendance
1	1	Wed, July 10	at Montreal Concordes	L 18–22	0–1	Olympic Stadium	22,946
2	2	Sun, July 21	vs. BC Lions	L 14–39	0–2	McMahon Stadium	15,769
3	3	Sun, July 28	at Ottawa Rough Riders	L 12–14	0–3	Lansdowne Park	20,153
4	4	Sat, Aug 3	vs. Saskatchewan Roughriders	L 17–30	0–4	McMahon Stadium	16,089
5	5	Sun, Aug 11	vs. Montreal Concordes	L 6–29	0–5	McMahon Stadium	13,153
6	6	Sat, Aug 17	at BC Lions	W 35–32	1–5	BC Place	37,462
7	7	Sun, Aug 25	at Winnipeg Blue Bombers	L 6–43	1–6	Winnipeg Stadium	28,166
8	8	Mon, Sept 2	vs. Edmonton Eskimos	L 28–34	1–7	McMahon Stadium	18,253
9	Bye						
10	9	Sat, Sept 14	vs. Ottawa Rough Riders	W 32–7	2–7	McMahon Stadium	12,076
11	10	Sat, Sept 21	at Edmonton Eskimos	L 6–17	2–8	Commonwealth Stadium	39,327
12	11	Sun, Sept 29	vs. Hamilton Tiger-Cats	L 13–30	2–9	McMahon Stadium	14,121
13	12	Fri, Oct 4	at Saskatchewan Roughriders	L 10–21	2–10	Taylor Field	19,700
14	13	Mon, Oct 14	vs. Toronto Argonauts	W 28–17	3–10	McMahon Stadium	18,303
15	14	Sun, Oct 20	at Toronto Argonauts	L 10–26	3–11	Exhibition Stadium	26,352
16	15	Fri, Oct 25	vs. Winnipeg Blue Bombers	L 4–47	3–12	McMahon Stadium	11,184
17	16	Sat, Nov 2	at Hamilton Tiger-Cats	L 17–21	3–13	Ivor Wynne Stadium	14,052

== Roster ==
1985 Calgary Stampeders final roster
Quarterbacks: 16 Rick Johnson; 13 Greg Vavra; Running backs: 20 Dwight Beverly; 7 Greg Fieger; 33 Larry Mason; 12 Tim Petros; Wide receivers: 88 Ray Alexander; 29 Scott Bissessar; 11 Rob Bresciani; 74 Parri Ceci; 3 Rufus Cox; 8 Spencer Jackson; 23 Tag Rome; 19 Emanuel Tolbert; Tight ends: 93 Dan Runge	Offensive linemen: 51 Randy Ambrosie T; 41 Kerry Berryman C; 69 Dave Kirzinger G/T; 65 Sean McKeown T; 66 Paul Palma G/T; 50 Mike Palumbo G; 57 Bob Poley C; 61 Tom Spoletini G; 68 Kari Yli-Renko T; Defensive linemen: 84 Gene Belliveau DT; 63 Don Chumley DE; 78 Vince Goldsmith DE; 75 Stu Laird DT; 62 Randy Trautman DT; 64 James Walker DE; Special teams: 2 J. T. Hay K	Linebackers: 96 Steve Carpenter; 77 Knox Culpepper; 47 Garrett Doll; 72 Bernie Morrison; 82 Mark Nelson; 96 Anthony Woodson; Defensive backs: 27 Richie Hall; 18 Donald Harris; 14 Larry Hogue; 15 Ron Hopkins; 28 Melvin Jenkins; 21 Ken Miller; 4 Darrell Moir; 24 Greg Peterson; Injured list: -- Mike Levenseller WR; Italics indicate International player

== Awards and records ==
=== 1985 CFL All-Stars ===
- None
