= 1985 Hamilton Tiger-Cats season =

Season of Canadian Football League team the Hamilton Tiger-Cats

- Head coach: Al Bruno
- Home stadium: Ivor Wynne Stadium

Results
- Record: 8–8
- Division place: 1st, East
- Playoffs: Lost Grey Cup
- Team MOP: Ken Hobart
- Team MOC: Paul Bennett
- Team MOR: Mike Derks

Uniform

The 1985 Hamilton Tiger-Cats season was the 28th season for the team in the Canadian Football League (CFL) and their 36th overall. The Tiger-Cats finished in first place in the East Division with an 8–8 record which marked the first time in league history that a team finished in first place without a winning record. The team appeared in the 73rd Grey Cup game, but lost to the BC Lions.

== Preseason ==
Game	Date	Opponent	Results		Venue	Attendance
Game	Date	Opponent	Score	Record	Venue	Attendance
A	June 11	at Toronto Argonauts	L 6–24	0–1		
B	June 17	vs. Toronto Argonauts	L 13–24	0–2		
C	June 21	at Montreal Concordes	L 13–32	0–3		
D	June 29	vs. Ottawa Rough Riders	W 33–14	1–3		

== Regular season ==
=== Season standings ===
East Division
Pos	Team	Pld	W	L	T	PF	PA	PD	Pts	Div	Stk
1	Hamilton Tiger-Cats (C, Q)	16	8	8	0	377	315	62	16	5–1	W3
2	Montreal Concordes (Q)	16	8	8	0	284	332	−48	16	2–4	W2
3	Ottawa Rough Riders (Q)	16	7	9	0	272	402	−130	14	4–2	L2
4	Toronto Argonauts	16	6	10	0	344	397	−53	12	1–5	W1

Source: "CFL.ca - Official Site of the Canadian Football League". Archived from the original on 2009-10-16.
(C) First round bye; (Q) Qualified for playoffs

=== Season schedule ===
Week	Game	Date	Opponent	Results		Venue	Attendance
Week	Game	Date	Opponent	Score	Record	Venue	Attendance
1	1	July 6	vs. BC Lions	L 8–42	0–1		
2	2	July 11	at Winnipeg Blue Bombers	L 11–16	0–2		
3	Bye						
4	3	July 26	vs. Toronto Argonauts	L 10–35	0–3		
5	4	Aug 2	at Montreal Concordes	W 39–11	1–3		
6	5	Aug 10	at Saskatchewan Roughriders	L 29–33	1–4		
7	6	Aug 18	vs. Winnipeg Blue Bombers	L 10–28	1–5		
8	7	Aug 24	at BC Lions	L 11–21	1–6		
9	8	Sept 2	vs. Montreal Concordes	W 19–16	2–6		
10	9	Sept 8	at Edmonton Eskimos	L 17–27	2–7		
11	10	Sept 15	at Toronto Argonauts	W 41–10	3–7		
12	11	Sept 22	vs. Ottawa Rough Riders	W 32–11	4–7		
13	12	Sept 29	at Calgary Stampeders	W 30–13	5–7		
14	13	Oct 5	vs. Edmonton Eskimos	L 12–17	5–8		
15	14	Oct 14	vs. Saskatchewan Roughriders	W 51–14	6–8		
16	Bye						
17	15	Oct 26	at Ottawa Rough Riders	W 36–4	7–8		
18	16	Nov 2	vs. Calgary Stampeders	W 21–17	8–8		

== Postseason ==
=== Schedule ===
Round	Date	Opponent	Results		Venue	Attendance
Round	Date	Opponent	Score	Record	Venue	Attendance
East Final	Nov 17	vs. Montreal Concordes	W 50–26	1–0		
Grey Cup	Nov 24	vs. BC Lions	L 24–37	1–1		

==== Grey Cup ====
Teams	1 Q	2 Q	3 Q	4 Q	Final
Hamilton Tiger-Cats	0	14	0	10	24
BC Lions	10	13	6	8	37

== Roster ==
1985 Hamilton Tiger-Cats final roster
Quarterbacks: 4 Ken Hobart; 8 Tom Porras; Running backs: 21 Rufus Crawford; 32 Dave Graffi; 34 Elmer James; 33 Derrek Peels; 30 Randy Rybansky; 19 Johnny Shepherd; 24 George Works; Wide receivers: 1 Tony Champion; 25 Scott Collie; 75 Ron Ingram; 17 Wayne Lee; 3 Steve Stapler; Tight ends: 23 Rocky Dipietro; 74 Steve Jackson	Offensive linemen: 63 Marv Allemang C; 53 Jeff Arp G; 51 Pat Brady G; 68 Mike Derks T; 66 Miles Gorrell T; 62 John Malinosky T; 56 Jason Riley G; 56 Dale Sanderson C; 67 Ralph Scholz T; Defensive linemen: 77 Grover Covington DE; 64 Leon Lyszkiewicz DT; 65 Mitchell Price DT; 88 Dave Sauve DE; 59 Rod Skillman DE; 61 Mike Walker DT; Special teams: 10 Bernie Ruoff K/P	Linebackers: 72 Leo Ezerins; 41 Greg Gary; 39 Ed Gataveckas; 43 Reggie Mathis; 36 John Priestner; 50 Lance Thompson; 31 Ben Zambiasi; Defensive backs: 27 Paul Bennett; 15 Less Browne; 16 Howard Fields; 37 Terry Lehne; 26 Donovan Rose; 20 Mark Streeter; Injured list: 14 Gerald Bess DB; Italics indicate American players
