= Mike Derks =

Mike Derks may refer to:

- Mike Derks (Canadian football)
- Mike Derks (musician)
