= 1985 Toronto Argonauts season =

CFL team season

- Head coach: Bob O'Billovich
- Home stadium: Exhibition Stadium

Results
- Record: 6–10
- Division place: 4th, East
- Playoffs: did not qualify

Uniform

The 1985 Toronto Argonauts finished in fourth place in the East Division with a 6–10 record and failed to make the playoffs.

== Regular season ==
=== Standings ===
East Division
Pos	Team	Pld	W	L	T	PF	PA	PD	Pts	Div	Stk
1	Hamilton Tiger-Cats (C, Q)	16	8	8	0	377	315	62	16	5–1	W3
2	Montreal Concordes (Q)	16	8	8	0	284	332	−48	16	2–4	W2
3	Ottawa Rough Riders (Q)	16	7	9	0	272	402	−130	14	4–2	L2
4	Toronto Argonauts	16	6	10	0	344	397	−53	12	1–5	W1

Source: "CFL.ca - Official Site of the Canadian Football League". Archived from the original on 2009-10-16.
(C) First round bye; (Q) Qualified for playoffs

=== Schedule ===
Week	Date	Opponent	Result	Record	Venue	Attendance
1	July 5	at Edmonton Eskimos	L 23–25	0–1	Commonwealth Stadium	40,373
2	July 12	vs. Saskatchewan Roughriders	W 29–25	1–1	Exhibition Stadium	30,421
3	July 20	at Winnipeg Blue Bombers	L 27–28	1–2	Winnipeg Stadium	27,641
4	July 26	at Hamilton Tiger-Cats	W 35–10	2–2	Ivor Wynne Stadium	17,566
5	Aug 1	vs. BC Lions	L 18–43	2–3	Exhibition Stadium	31,276
6	Aug 9	vs. Edmonton Eskimos	W 43–23	3–3	Exhibition Stadium	29,056
7	Aug 16	at Montreal Concordes	L 10–28	3–4	Olympic Stadium	26,747
8	Aug 22	vs. Ottawa Rough Riders	L 8–18	3–5	Exhibition Stadium	29,637
9	Bye					
10	Sept 6	at BC Lions	L 23–32	3–6	BC Place	40,782
11	Sept 15	vs. Hamilton Tiger-Cats	L 10–41	3–7	Exhibition Stadium	28,824
12	Bye					
13	Sept 27	vs. Winnipeg Blue Bombers	W 27–24	4–7	Exhibition Stadium	28,052
14	Oct 6	at Ottawa Rough Riders	L 15–19	4–8	Lansdowne Park	18,363
15	Oct 14	at Calgary Stampeders	L 17–28	4–9	McMahon Stadium	18,303
16	Oct 20	vs. Calgary Stampeders	W 26–10	5–9	Exhibition Stadium	26,352
17	Oct 27	vs. Montreal Concordes	L 3–17	5–10	Exhibition Stadium	28,837
18	Nov 3	at Saskatchewan Roughriders	W 30–26	6–10	Taylor Field	19,212

== Roster ==
1985 Toronto Argonauts final roster
Quarterbacks: 12 Danny Barrett WR; 7 Condredge Holloway; 11 Ricky Turner; Running backs: 24 Walt Bender; 34 Bob Bronk; 23 Sterling Hinds; 37 Warren Hudson; 32 Kevin Lowe; Receivers: 27 Jan Carinci DB; 9 Steve Cox; 10 Terry Greer; 71 Greg Holmes; 25 Paul Pearson; 20 Kerry Taylor; 30 Geoff Townsend; 26 Stanley Washington	Offensive linemen: 54 Tony Antunovic G/C; 56 Ian Beckstead C; 69 Dan Ferrone G; 51 Jeff Inglis T; 65 Dan Petschenig G; 66 Kelvin Pruenster T; 50 Tom Trifaux T; Defensive linemen: 79 Walter Ballard DE; 74 James Curry DT/DE; 57 Steve Del Col DE; 61 Gary Dulin DT; 77 Rodney Harding DE/DT; 63 Jim Merritts DT; 76 Mark Seale DT; Special teams: 4 Lance Chomyc K; 8 Hank Ilesic P/K	Linebackers: 73 David Marshall; 39 William Mitchell; 36 Don Moen; 35 Dan Rashovich; 70 James Reed; Defensive backs: 2 Carl Brazley; 14 Dennis Clay; 21 Marcellus Greene; 15 Cliff Hewitt; 19 Steve Johnson; 6 Brian Marrow; 26 Bo Metcalf; 18 Jerry Nash; 13 Darrell Wilson; 17 Preston Young; Italics indicate International player
