= Steve Buratto =

Canadian football coach and former player

Biographical details
- Born: c. 1943 (age 82–83)

Playing career
- 1963–65: Idaho
- Position: Center

Coaching career (HC unless noted)
- 1980: Saskatchewan Roughriders (AC)
- 1981-1982: Saskatchewan Roughriders (OL)
- 1983: BC Lions (DC)
- 1984-85: Calgary Stampeders (HC)
- 1986-1987: BC Lions (OC)
- 1988-1989: BC Lions (DC)
- 1993: Saskatchewan Roughriders (OL)
- 1994-1995: Baltimore Stallions (OC/OL)
- 2000-2002: BC Lions (HC)
- 2004: BC Lions (OC)
- 2005: Calgary Stampeders (OC/OL)
- 2006: Calgary Stampeders (AHC/OC)
- 2007-2008: Toronto Argonauts (OC)
- 2009: Toronto Argonauts (STC/RB)
- 2010: Hamilton Tiger-Cats (OL)
- 2011: Saskatchewan Roughriders (OL)
- 2013-2014: U of C Dinos (OL)
- 2015-2017: UBC Thunderbirds (AHC/OC)

Accomplishments and honors

Championships
- 2× Grey Cup champion (1995, 2000)

Steve Buratto (born c. 1943) is a former offensive lineman. He is also a former head coach in the Canadian Football League with the Calgary Stampeders and BC Lions, the latter of which he won the 88th Grey Cup with.

== Career ==
=== Playing career ===
Buratto played for Clarkston High School in Clarkston, Washington, and graduated in 1961. He did not make the varsity team until his senior year. He attended junior college at Columbia Basin College for a year in Pasco, Washington, then transferred to the University of Idaho in Moscow, recruited by Bud Riley to play for head coach Dee Andros. He redshirted in 1962 and then was a center for the Vandals for three seasons, and played with Jerry Campbell and Don Matthews.

Buratto was not selected in the 1966 NFL draft. He tried out with the Green Bay Packers, taught at Sandpoint High School for a year, and was invited to try again with Green Bay in 1967. After losing 25 pounds (11 kg) due to an intestinal virus, Buratto arrived at camp weakened and underweight. He returned to Idaho as a graduate assistant. In 1968, Buratto left for Twin Falls High School in southern Idaho, where he was an assistant football coach and the wrestling coach. In 1973, he joined the staff at Boise State under head coach Tony Knap, a fellow former Vandal. He followed Knap to UNLV in 1976 for four seasons, before he left for Saskatchewan of the CFL.

=== Coaching career ===
Buratto's professional coaching career started in 1980 as the offensive line coach for the Saskatchewan Roughriders. In 1983, he became the defensive coordinator for the B.C. Lions, where his team lost to the Argonauts in the Grey Cup final. He was named head coach of the Calgary Stampeders in 1984. After a 6–10 record and last place finish in the West Division in 1984, followed by a poor start the following year, he was fired and replaced by Bud Riley. In 1986 he returned to B.C. as their Co-Offensive Coordinator/Defensive Coordinator. After a 7-year hiatus, he returned to coaching in 1993 as the offensive line coach for the Saskatchewan Roughriders. He then helped build one of the greatest offences in league history as offensive coordinator of the Baltimore Stallions. In 1994 and 1995 the team made back-to-back Grey Cup appearances.

In 2000, he became the receivers coach for the Lions. However, he only held the job for a few weeks as he was promoted to head coach after head coach Greg Mohns resigned to join the XFL. Over the team's final 11 games he led the Lions to a 5–6 record and earned a spot in the playoffs. In the Division Semifinals, B.C. upset the Edmonton Eskimos 34–32 at Commonwealth Stadium. In the Division Finals, the Lions traveled to McMahon Stadium where they defeated the 12–5-1 Calgary Stampeders 37–23. In the 88th Grey Cup, the Lions faced the 12–6 Montreal Alouettes. Despite being an underdog, the Lions held the lead throughout the game and won 28–26. The Lions, who finished with an 8–10 record during the regular season, became the first team ever to finish with a regular season record below .500 and win the Grey Cup.

Buratto was retained by the Lions for the 2001 season, going 8–10 and losing to Calgary in the Division Semifinals. After a 1–5 start in 2002, Buratto was replaced by general manager Adam Rita.

Buratto became the Lions’ Offensive Coordinator in 2003 and in 2004 and led the team to the Grey Cup. In 2005 he joined Tom Higgins staff in Calgary as offensive coordinator. After being let go by the Stampeders, the Argonauts hired Buratto to replace the fired Kent Austin as offensive coordinator. In 2009, he was reassigned to Special Teams Coordinator and running backs coach. In 2010, he was hired as the offensive line coach for the Hamilton Tiger-Cats. After spending one season with the Tiger-Cats, Buratto joined the Saskatchewan Roughriders to assume the offensive line coach position.

== Personal life ==
Buratto is married to Judy Buratto. They currently live in Boise. Buratto has three children from a previous marriage.

== Coaching record ==
Team	Year	Regular season					Postseason		
Team	Year	Won	Lost	Ties	Win %	Finish	Won	Lost	Result
CAL	1984	6	10	0	.375	5th in West Division	–	–	Missed playoffs
CAL	1985	1	7	0	.125	5th in West Division	–	–	Fired
BC	2000	5	6	0	.454	3rd in West Division	3	0	Won Grey Cup
BC	2001	8	10	0	.444	3rd in West Division	0	1	Lost in Division Semifinals
BC	2002	1	5	0	.167	4th in West Division	–	–	Fired
Total		21	38	0	.356	1 West Division; Championship	3	1	1 Grey Cup

Preceded by Ron Lancaster	Grey Cup–winning head coach 88th Grey Cup, 2000	Succeeded by Wally Buono
