= Dave Skrien =

American gridiron football player and coach (1929–2010)

No. 43
- Positions: Fullback, Linebacker

Personal information
- Born: April 4, 1929; Morris, Minnesota, U.S.
- Died: November 30, 2010 (aged 81); Mound, Minnesota, U.S.

Career information
- College: Minnesota

Career history

Playing
- 1953: Saskatchewan Roughriders
- 1953–1954: Winnipeg Blue Bombers

Coaching
- 1955: Albert Lea HS (MN)
- 1956–1957: Ball State (assistant)
- 1958: Minnesota (assistant)
- 1959–1961: BC Lions (backfield)
- 1961–1967: BC Lions
- 1968: Boise State College (assistant)
- 1969: Edmonton Eskimos (assistant)
- 1971–1972: Saskatchewan Roughriders
- 1975: Memphis Southmen (backfield)
- 1977–1984: Golden Valley Lutheran College

Operations
- 1988–1995: Minnesota football administrative assistant and recruiting coordinator

Awards and highlights
- Grey Cup champion (1964); Annis Stukus Trophy (1963)

David Albert Skrien (April 4, 1929 – November 30, 2010) was a Canadian Football League player and coach.

Skrien graduated from Morris High School (1946) and Minnesota (1950) where he played fullback and linebacker. He played two seasons in the CFL before becoming a coach.

Skrien's first coaching job was at Albert Lea High School where he spent one season as head coach. From there he served as an assistant at Ball State and Minnesota before returning to the CFL as the BC Lions backfield coach in 1959. Skrien was elevated to the Lions' head coaching position during the 1961 season after an 0–6–1 start. In his six seasons as the Lions head coach, Skrien's teams had a record of 42–47–5 and played in two Grey Cup Games, playing in Vancouver but losing to Hamilton in 1963 (BC's first Grey Cup appearance), and then winning the 1964 Grey Cup (52nd) by defeating Hamilton in Toronto. He also won the Annis Stukus Trophy in 1963 as the CFL coach of the year. With journalist Dick Beddoes, he wrote the book "Countdown to Grey Cup" which chronicled the 1964 championship season. Skrien was fired in 1967 after an 0–5 start.

After one season as an assistant coach at Boise State College, Skrien returned to the CFL as an assistant coach with the Edmonton Eskimos. When head coach Neill Armstrong left the Eskimos at the end of the season, management decided to promote the less experienced Ray Jauch to the head coaching position and Skrien did not return to Edmonton.

On December 29, 1970, Skrien was hired by the Saskatchewan Roughriders to replace head coach Eagle Keys. In his two seasons in Regina, the Roughriders had a 16–14–1 record and made the 1972 Grey Cup. Skrien resigned following the 1972 season.

In 1975, Skrien was hired by former CFL coach and executive Leo Cahill to coach the offensive backfield of the Memphis Southmen, which included Larry Csonka and Jim Kiick. After the World Football League folded, Skiren returned to his native Minnesota to coach Golden Valley Lutheran College. One of his players at GVLC was Nelson Simpson, who later wrestled under the name Nikita Koloff. In 1988, Skiren returned to his alma mater Minnesota as a football administrative assistant and recruiting coordinator. He retired after the 1995 season, but remained involved with Golden Gophers football.

== Death ==
Skrien died in a nursing home in Mound, Minnesota, on November 30, 2010, due to complications from Alzheimer's disease. He was 81 years old.

== Head coaching record ==
=== CFL ===
Team	Year	Regular season					Postseason		
Team	Year	Won	Lost	Ties	Win %	Finish	Won	Lost	Result
BC	1961	1	7	1	.125	5th in Western Football Conference	-	-	Missed playoffs
BC	1962	7	9	0	.438	4th in Western Football Conference	-	-	Missed playoffs
BC	1963	12	4	0	.750	1st in Western Football Conference	2	2	Lost Grey Cup
BC	1964	11	2	3	.846	1st in Western Football Conference	3	1	Won Grey Cup
BC	1965	6	9	1	.400	4th in Western Football Conference	-	-	Missed playoffs
BC	1966	5	11	0	.313	5th in Western Football Conference	-	-	Missed playoffs
BC	1967	0	5	0	.000	5th in Western Football Conference	-	-	Fired
SSK	1971	9	6	1	.600	2nd in Western Football Conference	1	2	Lost in Conference Finals
SSK	1972	8	8	0	.500	3rd in Western Football Conference	2	1	Lost Grey Cup
