= 1985 Winnipeg Blue Bombers season =

Canadian football team season

- General manager: Cal Murphy
- Head coach: Cal Murphy
- Home stadium: Winnipeg Stadium

Results
- Record: 12–4
- Division place: 2nd, West
- Playoffs: Lost West Final

The 1985 Winnipeg Blue Bombers finished in second place in the West Division with a 12–4 record. They faced the BC Lions in the West Final for the third straight year. Despite winning both regular season meetings against the Lions, they lost the game 42–22, ending their hopes of repeating as Grey Cup champions.

== Preseason ==
Game	Date	Opponent	Results		Venue	Attendance
Game	Date	Opponent	Score	Record	Venue	Attendance
A	Mon, June 10	vs. Saskatchewan Roughriders	L 7–9	0–1	Winnipeg Stadium	22,027
B	Sun, June 16	vs. Calgary Stampeders	L 10–18	0–2	Winnipeg Stadium	23,826
C	Fri, June 21	at BC Lions	W 28–18	1–2	BC Place	26,921
D	Mon, June 24	at Edmonton Eskimos	W 22–7	2–2	Commonwealth Stadium	36,295

== Regular season ==
=== Standings ===
West Division
Pos	Team	Pld	W	L	T	PF	PA	PD	Pts
1	BC Lions (C, Q)	16	13	3	0	481	297	+184	26
2	Winnipeg Blue Bombers (Q)	16	12	4	0	500	259	+241	24
3	Edmonton Eskimos (Q)	16	10	6	0	432	373	+59	20
4	Saskatchewan Roughriders	16	5	11	0	320	462	−142	10
5	Calgary Stampeders	16	3	13	0	256	429	−173	6

Source: "CFL.ca - Official Site of the Canadian Football League". Archived from the original on 2009-10-16.
(C) First round bye; (Q) Qualified for playoffs

=== Schedule ===
Week	Game	Date	Opponent	Results		Venue	Attendance
Week	Game	Date	Opponent	Score	Record	Venue	Attendance
1	1	Thu, July 4	at Montreal Concordes	L 18–34	0–1	Olympic Stadium	23,627
2	2	Thu, July 11	vs. Hamilton Tiger-Cats	W 16–11	1–1	Winnipeg Stadium	25,428
3	3	Sat, July 20	vs. Toronto Argonauts	W 28–27	2–1	Winnipeg Stadium	27,641
4	4	Thu, July 25	at Edmonton Eskimos	L 23–25	2–2	Commonwealth Stadium	41,173
5	Bye						
6	5	Thu, Aug 8	vs. Ottawa Rough Riders	W 58–15	3–2	Winnipeg Stadium	27,709
7	6	Sun, Aug 18	at Hamilton Tiger-Cats	W 28–10	4–2	Ivor Wynne Stadium	14,206
8	7	Sun, Aug 25	vs. Calgary Stampeders	W 43–6	5–2	Winnipeg Stadium	28,166
9	8	Sun, Sept 1	at Saskatchewan Roughriders	W 18–10	6–2	Taylor Field	29,588
10	9	Sat, Sept 7	at Ottawa Rough Riders	W 42–14	7–2	Lansdowne Park	19,165
11	10	Fri, Sept 13	vs. Montreal Concordes	W 24–0	8–2	Winnipeg Stadium	30,593
12	11	Sun, Sept 22	vs. Saskatchewan Roughriders	W 49–3	9–2	Winnipeg Stadium	27,684
13	12	Fri, Sept 27	at Toronto Argonauts	L 24–27	9–3	Exhibition Stadium	28,052
14	13	Sun, Oct 6	vs. BC Lions	W 33–26	10–3	Winnipeg Stadium	32,946
15	14	Fri, Oct 11	at BC Lions	W 31–10	11–3	BC Place	59,478
16	15	Fri, Oct 18	vs. Edmonton Eskimos	L 18–37	11–4	Winnipeg Stadium	29,743
17	16	Fri, Oct 25	at Calgary Stampeders	W 47–4	12–4	McMahon Stadium	11,184

== Playoffs ==
=== West Semi-Final ===
Team	Q1	Q2	Q3	Q4	Total
Edmonton Eskimos	8	0	7	0	15
Winnipeg Blue Bombers	1	10	10	1	22

=== West Final ===
Team	Q1	Q2	Q3	Q4	Total
Winnipeg Blue Bombers	8	8	0	6	22
BC Lions	7	10	22	3	42

== Roster ==
1985 Winnipeg Blue Bombers final roster
Quarterbacks: 2 Tom Clements; 8 Norman Gibbs; 12 John Hufnagel; Running backs: 33 Pat Cantner; 39 Sean Kehoe; 38 Willard Reaves; Receivers: 70 Jeff Boyd; 29 Jerome Erdman DB; 72 Randy Fabi; 80 James Hood; 21 James Murphy; 25 Kevin Neiles; 71 Joe Poplawski; 34 Glenn Steele	Offensive linemen: 65 Nick Bastaja G; 59 Lyle Bauer G; 51 David Black T; 43 John Bonk C; 50 Mark Moors G/C; 62 Richard Nemeth T; 63 Chris Walby T; Defensive linemen: 75 Stan Mikawos NT; 55 Tony Norman DE; 78 Brent Racette NT/DE; 57 John Sturdivant DE; Special teams: 6 Bob Cameron P; 3 Trevor Kennerd K	Linebackers: 53 Joe Jackson; 35 Tyrone Jones; 69 Gary Moten; 74 Vernon Pahl; 76 Darrell Patterson; 31 Mike Robinson; 58 James West; Defensive backs: 23 Roy Bennett; 14 Scott Flagel; 24 Ken Hailey; 36 David Shaw; 28 Wylie Turner; Italics indicate American player
