= 1985 Montreal Concordes season =

Canadian football season

- Owner: Charles Bronfman
- Head coach: Joe Galat; Gary Durchik (Interim)
- Home stadium: Olympic Stadium

Results
- Record: 8–8
- Division place: 2nd, East
- Playoffs: Lost East Final

The 1985 Montreal Concordes season, saw the team finish in second place in the East Division with an 8–8 record and lose in the East Final to the Hamilton Tiger-Cats 50–26. This season marked the team's only playoff win under the Montreal Concordes banner.

== Preseason ==
Game	Date	Opponent	Results		Venue	Attendance
Game	Date	Opponent	Score	Record	Venue	Attendance
A	June 8	vs. Ottawa Rough Riders	W 34–10	1–0	Olympic Stadium	11,196
B	June 13	at Ottawa Rough Riders	W 37–22	2–0	Lansdowne Park	11,918
C	June 21	vs. Hamilton Tiger-Cats	W 32–13	3–0	Olympic Stadium	12,508
D	June 28	at Toronto Argonauts	W 9–8	4–0	Exhibition Stadium	26,437

== Regular season ==
=== Standings ===
East Division
Pos	Team	Pld	W	L	T	PF	PA	PD	Pts	Div	Stk
1	Hamilton Tiger-Cats (C, Q)	16	8	8	0	377	315	62	16	5–1	W3
2	Montreal Concordes (Q)	16	8	8	0	284	332	−48	16	2–4	W2
3	Ottawa Rough Riders (Q)	16	7	9	0	272	402	−130	14	4–2	L2
4	Toronto Argonauts	16	6	10	0	344	397	−53	12	1–5	W1

Source: "CFL.ca - Official Site of the Canadian Football League". Archived from the original on 2009-10-16.
(C) First round bye; (Q) Qualified for playoffs

=== Schedule ===
Week	Game	Date	Opponent	Results		Venue	Attendance
Week	Game	Date	Opponent	Score	Record	Venue	Attendance
1	1	July 4	vs. Winnipeg Blue Bombers	W 34–18	1–0	Olympic Stadium	23,627
2	2	July 10	vs. Calgary Stampeders	W 22–18	2–0	Olympic Stadium	22,946
3	3	July 19	at Saskatchewan Roughriders	W 21–12	3–0	Taylor Field	24,806
4	4	July 27	at BC Lions	L 15–28	3–1	BC Place Stadium	48,281
5	5	Aug 2	vs. Hamilton Tiger-Cats	L 11–39	3–2	Olympic Stadium	25,318
6	6	Aug 11	at Calgary Stampeders	W 29–6	4–2	McMahon Stadium	13,153
7	7	Aug 16	vs. Toronto Argonauts	W 28–10	5–2	Olympic Stadium	26,747
8	Bye						
9	8	Sept 2	vs. Hamilton Tiger-Cats	L 16–19	5–3	Ivor Wynne Stadium	15,549
10	9	Sept 8	vs. Saskatchewan Roughriders	W 33–12	6–3	Olympic Stadium	19,238
11	10	Sept 13	at Winnipeg Blue Bombers	L 0–24	6–4	Winnipeg Stadium	30,593
12	11	Sept 20	vs. BC Lions	L 20–31	6–5	Olympic Stadium	24,363
13	12	Sept 29	at Ottawa Rough Riders	L 7–23	6–6	Lansdowne Park	24,909
14	Bye						
15	13	Oct 12	at Edmonton Eskimos	L 1–39	6–7	Commonwealth Stadium	39,822
16	14	Oct 19	vs. Ottawa Rough Riders	L 7–30	6–8	Olympic Stadium	15,951
17	15	Oct 27	at Toronto Argonauts	W 17–3	7–8	Exhibition Stadium	28,837
18	16	Nov 3	vs. Edmonton Eskimos	W 23–20	8–8	Olympic Stadium	15,765

== Postseason ==
Round	Date	Opponent	Results		Venue	Attendance
Round	Date	Opponent	Score	Record	Venue	Attendance
East Semi-Final	Nov 10	vs. Ottawa Rough Riders	W 30–20	1–0	Olympic Stadium	11,372
East Final	Nov 17	at Hamilton Tiger-Cats	L 26–50	1–1	Ivor Wynne Stadium	24,423

== Roster ==
1985 Montreal Concordes final roster
Quarterbacks: 7 Joe Barnes; 9 Gerry Dattilio; 12 Turner Gill; Running backs: 21 Tony Johns; 33 Chuck McMann; 34 Alan Reid; 32 Rich Thomaselli; 30 Dwaine Wilson; Wide receivers: 29 Todd Brown; 88 Jacques Chapdelaine; 1 Dwight Edwards; 19 Kris Haines; 14 Mike McTague P/K; 80 Jeff Patterson; 22 Mike Washburn	Tight ends: 79 Nick Arakgi; Offensive linemen: 67 Trevor Bowles T; 69 Jerry Dobrovolny T; 66 Lloyd Fairbanks G; 58 Glenn Keeble C; 60 Blake Nill T; 54 Rob Smith G; 55 Larry Tittley C; Defensive linemen: 81 Sandy Armstrong DE; 72 Paul Martin DT; 49 Steve Raquet DE; 70 Doug Scott DT; 71 George Smith DE; 57 George Voelk DT; 71 Brett Williams DT	Linebackers: 75 Ken Ciancone; 35 Mike Emery; 42 Paul Gray; 77 Mark Hopkins; 72 Lemont Jeffers; 76 Frank Kosec; 47 John Pointer; 52 Ali Witherspoon; Defensive backs: 36 Myles Darling; 8 Aaron Hill; 6 Phil Jones; 18 Vince Phason; 27 Rick Ryan; 26 Harry Skipper; Special teams: 5 Roy Kurtz K; Injured list: 10 Mark Stevens QB; Italics indicate American players
