= Mike O'Shea (Canadian football) =

Canadian football coach (born 1970)

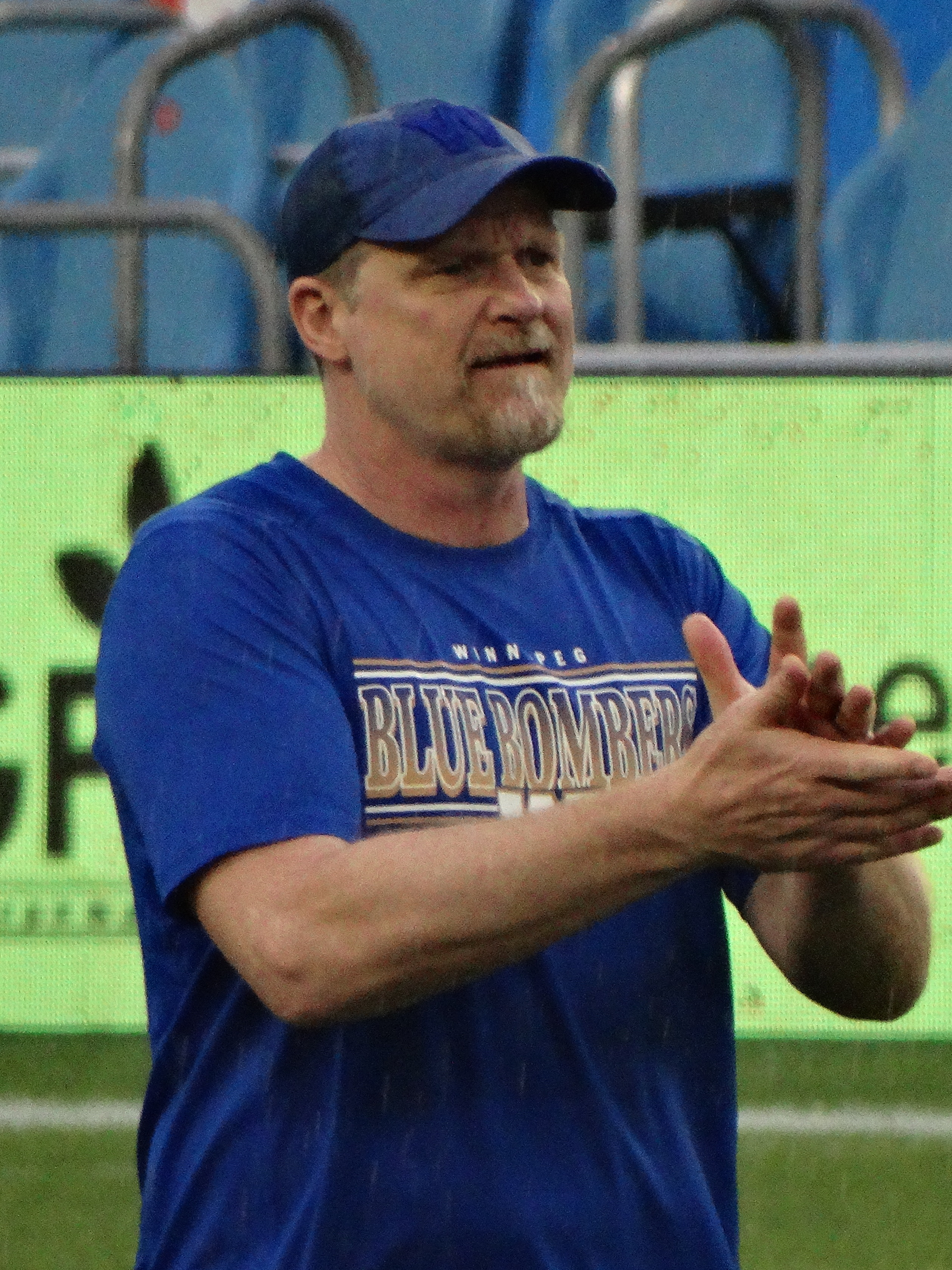
- O'Shea with the Winnipeg Blue Bombers in 2025

Personal information
- Born: September 21, 1970 (age 56); North Bay, Ontario, Canada
- Listed height: 6 ft 2 in (1.88 m)
- Listed weight: 228 lb (103 kg)

Career information
- Position: Linebacker (No. 50)
- High school: Widdifield
- University: Guelph
- CFL draft: 1993: 1st round, 4th overall pick

Career history

Playing
- 1993–1995: Hamilton Tiger-Cats
- 1996: Detroit Lions*
- 1996–1999: Toronto Argonauts
- 2000: Hamilton Tiger-Cats
- 2001–2008: Toronto Argonauts
- * Offseason or practice squad member only

Coaching
- 2010–2013: Toronto Argonauts (STC)
- 2014–2026: Winnipeg Blue Bombers (HC)

Awards and highlights
- 6× Grey Cup champion (1996, 1997, 2004, 2012, 2019, 2021); CFL Most Outstanding Rookie (1993); Frank M. Gibson Trophy (1993); CFL Most Outstanding Canadian (1999); Lew Hayman Trophy (1999); 2× Annis Stukus Trophy (2021, 2022); CFL All-Star (1999); 3× CFL East All-Star (1994, 1999, 2000); CFL North Division All-Star (1995); All-Time Argos Team (MLB)
- Stats at CFL.ca (archive)
- Canadian Football Hall of Fame (Class of 2017)

Michael O'Shea (born September 21, 1970) is a Canadian professional football coach and former linebacker. He most recently served as the head coach of the Winnipeg Blue Bombers of the Canadian Football League (CFL). He currently ranks seventh all-time for wins by a CFL head coach. O'Shea was the special teams coordinator of the Toronto Argonauts of the CFL from 2010 to 2013, winning the Grey Cup in 2012. O'Shea played 16 seasons in the CFL for the Hamilton Tiger-Cats and Toronto Argonauts from 1993 to 2008. He retired second all-time in career tackles with 1,154 and is one of only three players to record over 1,000 tackles. He won the CFL's Most Outstanding Canadian Award in 1999 after recording 84 tackles, 13 special teams tackles and three interceptions that year. O'Shea is a three-time Grey Cup champion as a player, having won all three with the Argonauts in 1996, 1997, and 2004. He is also a two-time Grey Cup winning head coach, having won with the Winnipeg Blue Bombers in 2019 and 2021; O'Shea also won the Grey Cup previously as a special teams coach with the Toronto Argonauts in the 100th Grey Cup.

== Professional career ==
=== Hamilton Tiger-Cats (1993–1995) ===
The Edmonton Eskimos picked O'Shea in the 1st round (4th overall) in the 1993 CFL Canadian College Draft. However, he was soon after traded to Hamilton by Edmonton along with QB DeChane Cameron, linebacker DeWayne Odom and a negotiation list player in exchange for QB Damon Allen on February 16, 1993.

In his first season in the CFL in 1993, O'Shea started in all 18 games. In 1994, he once again played in all 18 games during the regular season. He had 95 DT, 11 special teams tackles and 5 interceptions during the regular season. He was also named to the East Division All-Star team at middle linebacker. In 1995, O'Shea played in 10 games for Hamilton, made 69 DT, 4 special teams tackles and intercepted 2 passes during the regular season. He was named to the North Division All-Star team. In Hamilton's 31–13 loss to the Calgary Stampeders in the North Division Semi-Final, made 4 DT and 1 special teams tackle.

=== Toronto Argonauts (1996–1999) ===
O'Shea signed with the Argonauts half way through the 1996 season after he was one of the final cuts in the Detroit Lions training camp. He played in the last 8 games of the regular season started Toronto's final 5 games of the regular season. He helped lead Toronto to the 1996 Grey Cup game in a win over Edmonton. He would also help Toronto win its second Grey Cup in as many years in the 1997 game. O'Shea would also play in Toronto in the 1998 and 1999 season as middle linebacker, putting up good numbers.

=== Second stint with the Hamilton Tiger-Cats (2000) ===
Hamilton acquired O'Shea in a trade with Toronto in exchange for RB Éric Lapointe, the right of first refusal on all offensive lineman and the playing rights to Orlondo Steinauer on June 11, 2000. He made an immediate impact in the season opener vs. B.C. as he contributed with 7 DT, made 3 DT On October 13, 2000 in the Tiger-Cats' 32–8 loss to Toronto, O'Shea had his best individual game of the season with 12 DT and 1 pass knockdown. He finished the season third in the league with 90 DT.

=== Second stint with the Toronto Argonauts (2001–2008) ===
O'Shea signed with the Argonauts once again as a free agent in the 2001 season. The Argonauts had a horrible 2001 season. In 2002, the Argos seemed to turn it around, and made it to the East final only to lose to Montreal. In his second tenure with the Argonauts, O'Shea was an important component of the Argonauts' strong defence. In 2004, O'Shea helped lead the Argos to the 2004 Grey Cup Championship, beating the B.C. Lions 27–19, winning his 3rd Grey Cup, all with the Argonauts.

Against the Saskatchewan Roughriders on October 20, 2006, he became the first Canadian and third player in CFL history to record 1000 career tackles. In 2007, he was voted as the middle linebacker on the All-Time Argos Team. O'Shea was released by the Argonauts on February 27, 2009. He finished his career with the second most games played by an Argonaut with 205, 17 games behind former linebacker Don Moen.

Based on his playing career, he was inducted into the Canadian Football Hall of Fame in 2017.

== Coaching career ==
=== Assistant coach ===
O'Shea was hired by the Toronto Argonauts as their special teams coordinator for the 2010 season.

In 2010, Chad Owens won the John Agro Special Teams Award and was named a CFL East and CFL league all-star special teams player.

In 2011, Owens was a CFL East and CFL league all-star special teams player, and Noel Prefontaine was the CFL East all-star punter.

In 2012, Owens won the CFL's Most Outstanding Player Award. O'Shea won his first Grey Cup as a coach in the 100th Grey Cup.

=== Head coach ===
The Winnipeg Blue Bombers hired O'Shea on December 4, 2013, he became the team's 30th head coach in team history.

The Blue Bombers gradually improved from the season before O'Shea arrived, 2013, when the team only won 3 regular season games, to 2019, when the team won the Grey Cup.

In 2014, the Blue Bombers started the season 5–1, but finished 7–11 and did not qualify for the playoffs.

In 2015, the Blue Bombers started the season 3–3, but finished 5–13 and did not qualify for the playoffs. One highlight for the season was the team's season-opening victory against the Saskatchewan Roughriders in Regina. The Blue Bombers had not won a game in Regina since 2004.

In 2016, the Blue Bombers started the season 1–4, but would go on to win their next seven in a row. Among these victories was a win in the Labour Day Classic against Saskatchewan in Regina. This would be the Blue Bombers' first Labour Day Classic victory since 2004. The Blue Bombers finished third in the West Division, and had their first winning season (11–7) since 2011. The team qualified for the playoffs for the first time since 2011. In the West Semi-Final against the host BC Lions, the Blue Bombers lost 32–31.

In 2017, the Blue Bombers tied both of their preseason games. The first was against Saskatchewan in the first CFL game played at the new Mosaic Stadium in Regina. The second was versus Edmonton. After a bye week in Week 1, the Blue Bombers travelled back to Regina, and played against Saskatchewan in the first ever regular season game at the new Mosaic Stadium. The Blue Bombers won 43–40 in overtime when Justin Medlock kicked the winning field goal. The Blue Bombers finished 12–6 on the season, which ranked second in the West Division, and second in the CFL overall. Winnipeg hosted their first playoff game since 2011, but lost 39–32 to Edmonton.

In 2018, the Blue Bombers lost four games in a row between games 9 and 12, but would win their next five afterwards, including a shutout victory at home against Saskatchewan. Winnipeg finished third in the West Division with a 10–8 record, and travelled to play Saskatchewan in the West Semi-Final in the first ever playoff game at the new Mosaic Stadium. The Blue Bombers won the game 23–18, the team's first playoff victory since 2011, and would appear in a division final for the first time since 2011. In the West Final, Winnipeg fell to the eventual Grey Cup champions, the Calgary Stampeders, 22–14.

In 2019, O'Shea's sixth year with the team, the Blue Bombers finished 11–7 and third place in the West Division. The team finished with an 8–1 home record, but would have to play on the road for the entire playoffs. In the West Semi-Final, the Blue Bombers defeated the defending Grey Cup champion Calgary Stampeders 35–14 at McMahon Stadium. In the West Final, Winnipeg travelled to Saskatchewan and defeated the Roughriders 20–13, allowing the Blue Bombers to play in their first Grey Cup game since 2011. The following week, O'Shea guided the Blue Bombers to their first Grey Cup victory since 1990 when they defeated the Hamilton Tiger-Cats 33–12 in the 107th Grey Cup game. This victory ended a 29-year drought in Winnipeg, one of the longest in CFL history. O'Shea had helped establish a winning foundation for the Bombers, following four successful double-digit win seasons. As a result of this, the Blue Bombers extended him for an additional three seasons through to 2022.

The 2020 season was cancelled due to the COVID-19 pandemic.

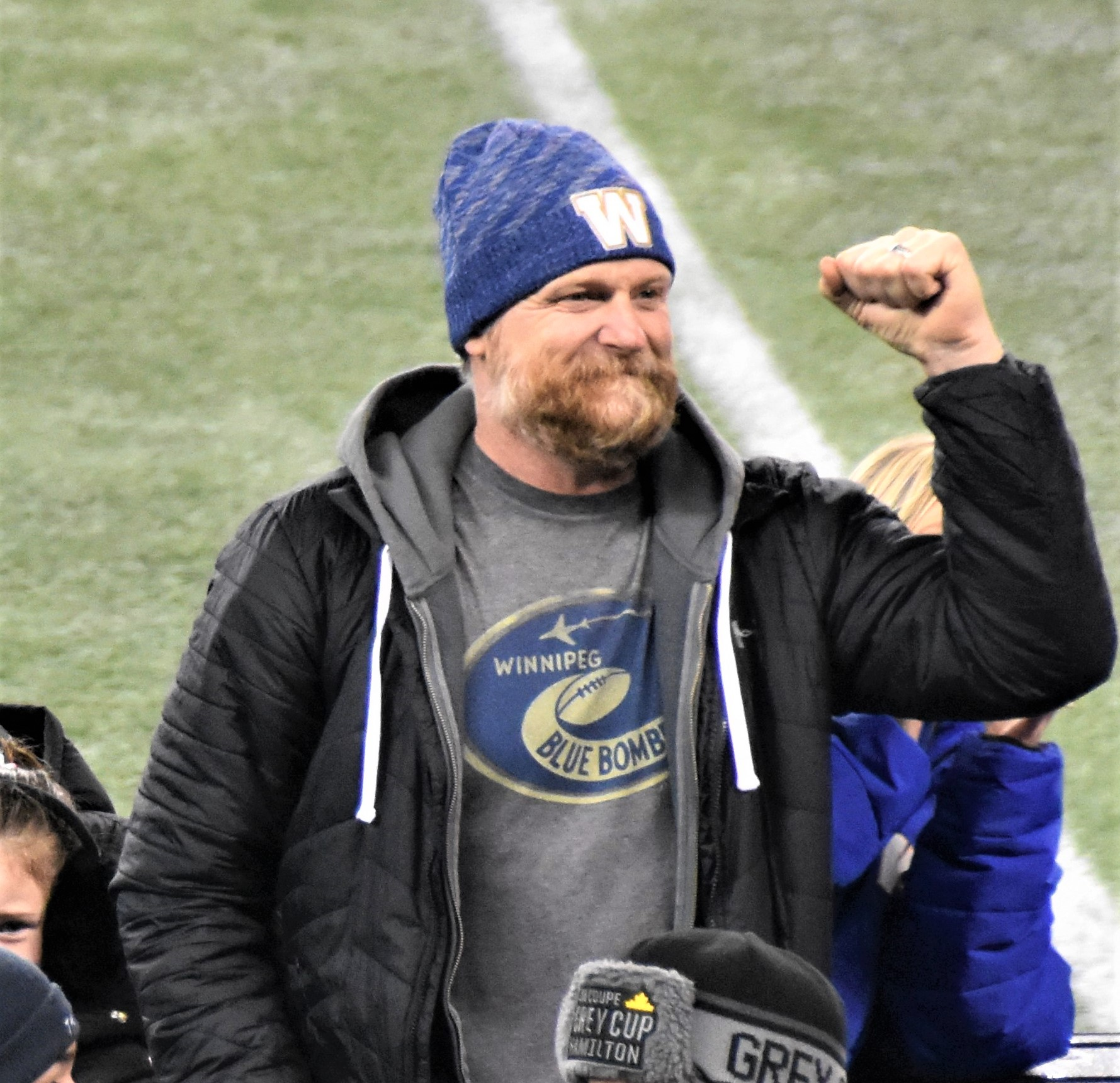
O'Shea at the Blue Bombers 2021 Grey Cup celebration in Winnipeg.

In 2021, the Blue Bombers were able to maintain a roster largely intact following the hiatus 2020 season. They finished first place in the West Division with a league-best 11–3 record, and went undefeated at home. This was the first time they finished first place in the West Division since 1972; they had finished first place in the East Division several times over the years. The Blue Bombers hosted the Saskatchewan Roughriders as they had in the 1972 West Final, but unlike that year, the Blue Bombers defeated the Roughriders 21–17. This victory allowed the Blue Bombers to qualify for their second consecutive Grey Cup appearance, something the team had not done since 1992–1993. O'Shea was named Coach of the Year for the first time. Winnipeg would once again defeat Hamilton in the 108th Grey Cup, this time played at Hamilton's home stadium, 33–25 in overtime.

In 2022, the Blue Bombers once again finished with the best record in the CFL, this time 15–3. They would host BC in the West Final, defeating them 28–20. The Blue Bombers would qualify for their third consecutive Grey Cup appearance, something not done since 1957–1959 when Bud Grant was the team's head coach. O'Shea was named Coach of the Year for the second straight season. The Blue Bombers lost to the Toronto Argonauts in the 109th Grey Cup game 24–23. Following three consecutive trips to the championship game, O'Shea and the Blue Bombers agreed on a three-year contract extension in December 2022.

In 2023, the Blue Bombers finished 14–4, good for first place in the West Division for the third consecutive season, but second in the league to the defending Grey Cup champion, Toronto Argonauts, who finished 16–2. Winnipeg defeated BC in the West Final for the second consecutive season, qualifying them for their fourth consecutive Grey Cup appearance. In the 110th Grey Cup game, the Blue Bombers lost on a last second touchdown to the Montreal Alouettes.

In 2024, Winnipeg started 0–4 and 2–6. In the team's ninth game, they shutout the BC Lions 25–0 at home, and held the Lions to four first downs for the entire game. In the team's 10th game of the season, after a bye week, Winnipeg defeated BC once again. This was O'Shea's 100th regular season win as a head coach. In Winnipeg's Labour Day Classic victory against Saskatchewan, O'Shea tied Bud Grant's 102 victories as Blue Bombers head coach. In the team's Banjo Bowl win over Saskatchewan the following week, he broke Grant's record; his 103rd victory as a CFL head coach placed him ninth all-time in victories for CFL head coaches. By the end of the season, O'Shea had tied Bob O'Billovich for eighth all-time in head coaching wins (107). The Blue Bombers finished with a winning record for the eighth consecutive season, first in the West Division for the fourth consecutive season, and appeared in the West Final for the sixth consecutive season. In the West Final, Winnipeg defeated Saskatchewan 38–22 en route to their fifth consecutive Grey Cup appearance, but lost the 111th Grey Cup game to Toronto for the second time in three years.

In early 2025, O'Shea surpassed the all-time head coaching win totals of O'Billovich (107) and Dave Ritchie (108), moving into seventh all-time. The Blue Bombers finished in fourth place in the division with a 10–8 record and qualified for the playoffs as the crossover team for the first time in franchise history, losing the East Semi-Final to the Montreal Alouettes. In 2026, the Blue Bombers again finished in fourth place and in the crossover position but failed to achieve a winning record for the first time since 2015. The team defeated the Argonauts in the East Semi-Final, but lost the East Final to the Alouettes. On November 19, 2026, O'Shea was dismissed as head coach of the Blue Bombers after 12 seasons with the team.

=== CFL coaching record ===
Team	Year	Regular season					Postseason		
Team	Year	Won	Lost	Ties	Win %	Finish	Won	Lost	Result
WPG	2014	7	11	0	.389	5th in West Division	–	–	Missed playoffs
WPG	2015	5	13	0	.278	4th in West Division	–	–	Missed playoffs
WPG	2016	11	7	0	.611	3rd in West Division	0	1	Lost in Division Semi-Finals
WPG	2017	12	6	0	.667	2nd in West Division	0	1	Lost in Division Semi-Finals
WPG	2018	10	8	0	.556	3rd in West Division	1	1	Lost in Division Finals
WPG	2019	11	7	0	.611	3rd in West Division	3	0	Won 107th Grey Cup
WPG	2020	Season cancelled							
WPG	2021	11	3	0	.786	1st in West Division	2	0	Won 108th Grey Cup
WPG	2022	15	3	0	.833	1st in West Division	1	1	Lost 109th Grey Cup
WPG	2023	14	4	0	.778	1st in West Division	1	1	Lost 110th Grey Cup
WPG	2024	11	7	0	.611	1st in West Division	1	1	Lost 111th Grey Cup
WPG	2025	10	8	0	.556	4th in West Division	0	1	Lost in Division Semi-Finals
WPG	2026	9	9	0	.500	4th in West Division	1	1	Lost in Division Finals
Total		126	86	0	.594	4 Division Championships	10	8	2 Grey Cups

== Personal life ==
O'Shea and his wife have three children; one son and two daughters. In August 2022 the City of North Bay, Ontario named a football field at the Steve Omischl Sports Complex after him.
