= List of Canadian Football League head coaches by wins =

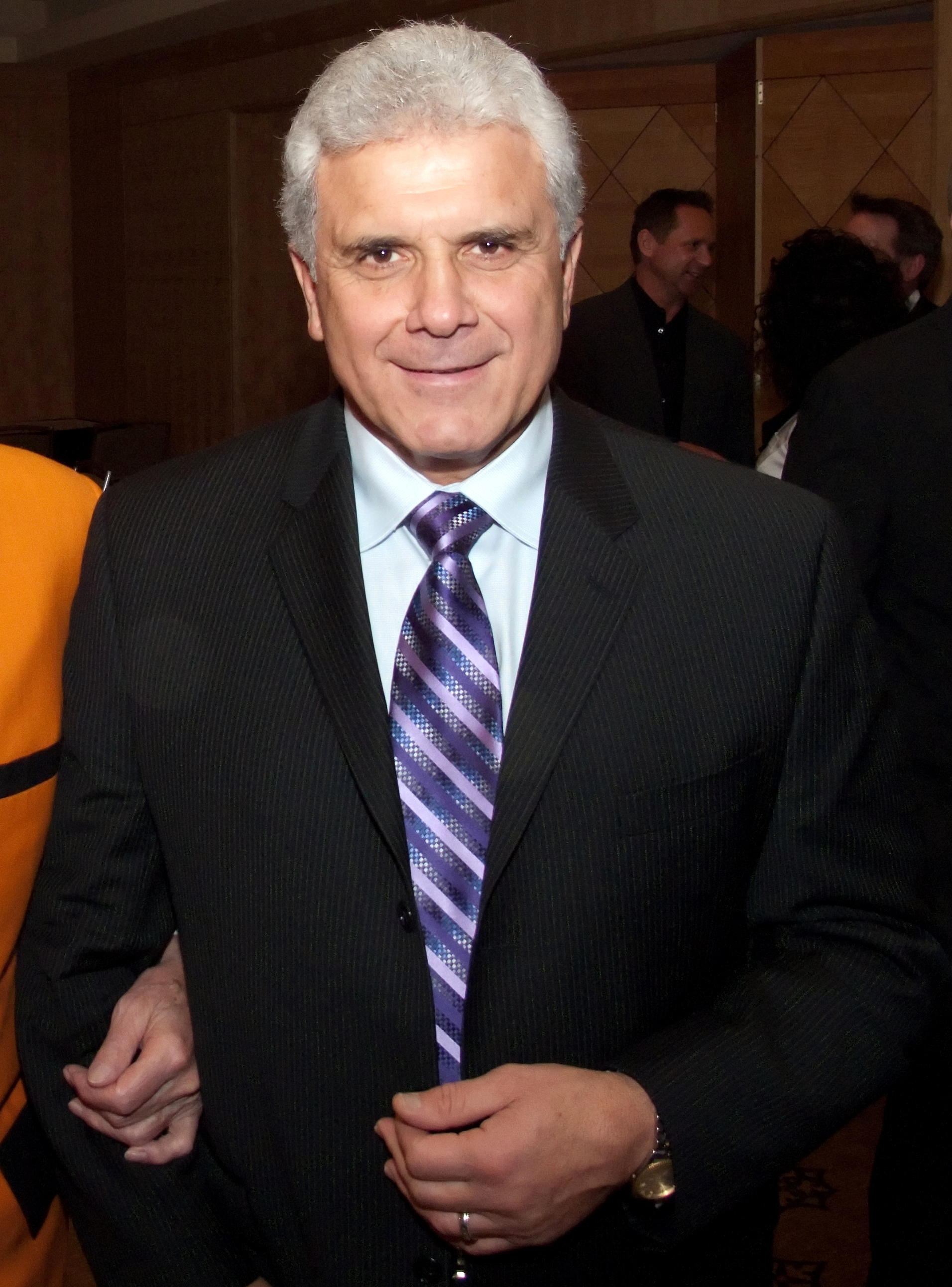
Wally Buono, the all-time winningest coach in the Canadian Football League

This article contains a list of Canadian Football League head coaches by regular season wins. This list is current through the close of the 2026 regular season.

This list also includes coaches who coached in the CFL's predecessor leagues, the Interprovincial Rugby Football Union (CFL East Division) and the Western Interprovincial Football Union (CFL West Division).

Wally Buono is the all-time leader in both wins and losses with 282 wins, 165 losses, and three ties. 12 coaches have more than 100 wins and only Buono and Don Matthews have more than 200.

As of the end of the 2026 CFL season, the active head coach with the most wins is Mike O'Shea, who has 126 wins and 86 losses.

Five head coaches share the record for Grey Cup championships at five: Wally Buono, Don Matthews, Frank Clair, Hugh Campbell, and Lew Hayman.

== Top 20 head coaches by regular season wins ==
Key
†	Elected to the Canadian Football Hall of Fame as a builder
‡	Elected to the Canadian Football Hall of Fame as a player
*	Denotes active head coach

Coaches ranked by regular-season wins, then winning percentage
Rank	Coach	Seasons	Teams	Team wins	Team losses	Team ties	Career wins	Career losses	Ties	Pct	Ref.
1	Wally Buono†	1990–2002	Calgary Stampeders	153	79	2	282	165	3	.630	
1	Wally Buono†	2003–11, 2016–18	BC Lions	129	86	1	282	165	3	.630	
2	Don Matthews†	1983–1987	BC Lions	56	23	1	231	133	1	.634	
2	Don Matthews†	1990, 1996–98, 2008	Toronto Argonauts	49	31	0	231	133	1	.634	
2	Don Matthews†	1991–93	Saskatchewan Roughriders	25	22	0	231	133	1	.634	
2	Don Matthews†	1994–95	Baltimore Stallions	27	9	0	231	133	1	.634	
2	Don Matthews†	1999–2000	Edmonton Eskimos	16	20	0	231	133	1	.634	
2	Don Matthews†	2002–06	Montreal Alouettes	58	28	0	231	133	1	.634	
3	Frank Clair†	1950–54	Toronto Argonauts	31	31	2	147	106	7	.579	
3	Frank Clair†	1956–69	Ottawa Rough Riders	116	75	5	147	106	7	.579	
4	Ron Lancaster‡	1979–80	Saskatchewan Roughriders	4	28	0	142	137	1	.509	
4	Ron Lancaster‡	1991–97	Edmonton Eskimos	83	43	0	142	137	1	.509	
4	Ron Lancaster‡	1998–2003, 2006	Hamilton Tiger-Cats	55	66	1	142	137	1	.509	
5	Eagle Keys†	1959–63	Edmonton Eskimos	38	40	2	131	107	8	.549	
5	Eagle Keys†	1965–70	Saskatchewan Roughriders	68	25	3	131	107	8	.549	
5	Eagle Keys†	1971–75	BC Lions	25	42	3	131	107	8	.549	
6	Ray Jauch†	1970–76	Edmonton Eskimos	65	43	4	127	94	4	.573	
6	Ray Jauch†	1978–82	Winnipeg Blue Bombers	45	35	0	127	94	4	.573	
6	Ray Jauch†	1994–95	Saskatchewan Roughriders	17	19	0	127	94	4	.573	
7	Mike O'Shea‡*	2014–present	Winnipeg Blue Bombers	126	86	0	126	86	0	.594	
8	Dave Ritchie†	1993–95	BC Lions	31	22	1	108	76	3	.586	
8	Dave Ritchie†	1997–98	Montreal Alouettes	25	10	1	108	76	3	.586	
8	Dave Ritchie†	1999–2004	Winnipeg Blue Bombers	52	44	1	108	76	3	.586	
9	Bob O'Billovich†	1982–89, 1993–95	Toronto Argonauts	89	79	3	107	104	3	.507	
9	Bob O'Billovich†	1990–92	BC Lions	18	25	0	107	104	3	.507	
10	Dave Dickenson‡*	2016–present	Calgary Stampeders	104	69	3	104	69	3	.599	
11	John Hufnagel†	2008–15	Calgary Stampeders	102	41	1	102	41	1	.712	
12	Bud Grant†	1957–66	Winnipeg Blue Bombers	102	56	2	102	56	2	.644	
13	Cal Murphy†	1975–76	BC Lions	10	14	2	99	80	3	.552	
13	Cal Murphy†	1983–86, 1993–96	Winnipeg Blue Bombers	86	51	1	99	80	3	.552	
13	Cal Murphy†	1999	Saskatchewan Roughriders	3	15	0	99	80	3	.552	
14	Jason Maas*	2016–19	Edmonton Eskimos	39	33	0	86	57	1	.601	
14	Jason Maas*	2023–present	Montreal Alouettes	47	24	1	86	57	1	.601	
15	Tom Higgins	2001–04	Edmonton Eskimos	44	28	0	84	67	1	.552	
15	Tom Higgins	2005–07	Calgary Stampeders	28	25	1	84	67	1	.552	
15	Tom Higgins	2014–15	Montreal Alouettes	12	14	0	84	67	1	.552	
16	Jack Gotta	1970–73	Ottawa Rough Riders	30	26	0	83	82	5	.503	
16	Jack Gotta	1977–79, 1982–83	Calgary Stampeders	42	34	4	83	82	5	.503	
16	Jack Gotta	1985–86	Saskatchewan Roughriders	11	22	1	83	82	5	.503	
17	George Brancato	1974–84	Ottawa Rough Riders	82	90	4	82	90	4	.477	
18	Rick Campbell	2014–19	Ottawa Redblacks	44	62	2	82	92	2	.472	
18	Rick Campbell	2020–2024	BC Lions	38	30	0	82	92	2	.472	
19	Jim Trimble	1957–65	Hamilton Tiger-Cats	60	36	2	77	61	2	.557	
19	Jim Trimble	1963–65	Montreal Alouettes	17	25	0	77	61	2	.557	
20	Marc Trestman	2008–12	Montreal Alouettes	59	31	0	72	54	0	.571	
20	Marc Trestman	2017–18	Toronto Argonauts	13	23	0	72	54	0	.571	

== See also ==
- List of professional gridiron football coaches with 200 wins
