= Al Bruno =

American gridiron football player and coach, basketball player (1927–2014)

Profile
- Position: End

Personal information
- Born: March 28, 1927; West Chester, Pennsylvania, U.S.
- Died: October 5, 2014 (aged 87); Port Charlotte, Florida, U.S.
- Listed height: 6 ft 3 in (1.91 m)
- Listed weight: 185 lb (84 kg)

Career information
- High school: West Chester High School; The Perkiomen School
- College: University of Kentucky
- NFL draft: 1951: 3rd round, 32nd overall pick

Career history

Playing
- 1952–1954: Toronto Argonauts
- 1954: Ottawa Rough Riders
- 1955–1956: Winnipeg Blue Bombers
- 1958–1960: London Lords

Coaching
- 1958–1960: London Lords (HC)
- 1962–1965: West Chester HS (PA) (HC)
- 1966–1967: Ottawa Rough Riders (assistant)
- 1968–1970: Hamilton Tiger-Cats (assistant)
- 1971–1981: Harvard (OC)
- 1983–1990: Hamilton Tiger-Cats (HC)
- 1994–1996: McMaster (HC)

Operations
- 1982–1983: Hamilton Tiger-Cats (Director of Player Personnel)
- 1990: BC Lions (Head pro scout)
- 1991: Buffalo Bills (Scout)

Awards and highlights
- 2× Grey Cup champion (1952, 1986); NCAA Men's Division I Basketball Champion (1949); CFL All-Star : 1952; ORFU All-Star : 1958; Second-team All-SEC (1950); Annis Stukus Trophy (1986); Kentucky Athletics' Hall of Fame (2008); Chester County Sports Hall of Fame (2008); West Chester Henderson High School Hall of Fame (2004)

Albert P. Bruno (March 28, 1927 – October 5, 2014) was an American gridiron football player, administrator, and coach who served as the head coach of the Hamilton Tiger-Cats from 1983 to 1990.

== Early life ==
He was born in 1927 in West Chester, Pennsylvania. A graduate of West Chester High School and The Perkiomen School, Bruno attended the University of Kentucky from 1948 to 1951. He played end on Kentucky Wildcats football team, played forward for the Wildcats basketball team, and was a member of the track team.

In his senior season, Bruno caught 38 passes for 589 yards and 10 touchdowns and was named third-team All America by both AP and UPI. His single-season school record for receiving yards stood until 1964 and his single-season record for touchdown receptions held until 1998.

Bruno played nine games during the Wildcats 1948–49 championship winning basketball season, averaging 2.2 points per game.

Bruno is one of only three Wildcats to have played for Hall of Fame coaches Bear Bryant in football and Adolph Rupp in basketball.

== Playing career ==
Bruno was drafted by the Philadelphia Eagles in the third round of the 1951 NFL draft, but chose to play for the Toronto Argonauts instead. He played two seasons for the Argonauts, one game for the Ottawa Rough Riders, two seasons with the Winnipeg Blue Bombers, and three seasons with the London Lords before a serious knee injury ended his playing career.

== Coaching career ==
Bruno's coaching career began in 1958 a player-coach for the London Lords. After his playing career ended, he returned to Pennsylvania to teach and coach football at his alma mater West Chester High School.

In 1966, he returned to Canada as an assistant coach with the Ottawa Rough Riders. He left the Riders in 1968 and joined the coaching staff of the Hamilton Tiger-Cats. When head coach Joe Restic left to become head coach at Harvard, Bruno went with him to be the offensive coordinator.

After 11 seasons as the Crimson's offensive coordinator, Bruno returned to Hamilton as Director of Player Personnel. In 1983, Bruno was named head coach after the firing of Bud Riley. The Tiger-Cats finished the season 2–1–1 and Bruno was given the coaching job permanently. Under Bruno's guidance, the Tiger-Cats appeared in the Grey Cup four times, winning one (1986). He was placed on an indefinite leave of absence after suffering a mild heart attack during the 1987 season. Defensive Coordinator Ted Schmitz served as interim head coach for six games before Bruno returned. Bruno was fired 12 games into the 1990 season. At the time of his firing the Tiger-Cats had a 4–8 record and were on a five-game losing streak.

After scouting for the BC Lions and the Buffalo Bills, Bruno was named the head coach of the New Mexico Rattlesnakes of the new Professional Spring Football League. The PSFL folded before play began.

Bruno's final coaching job was at McMaster University, where he served as head coach from 1994 to 1996. After his football career, Bruno and his wife, Marie, retired to Port Charlotte, Florida.

== Death ==
In October 2014, Bruno was admitted into a Port Charlotte hospital with kidney problems, after having lost one kidney several years prior. He died of heart failure at the hospital on October 5, 2014.

== Head coaching record ==
=== CFL ===
Team	Year	Regular season					Postseason		
Team	Year	Won	Lost	Ties	Win %	Finish	Won	Lost	Result
HAM	1983	2	1	1	.667	3rd in East Division	1	1	Lost in East Final
HAM	1984	6	9	1	.400	2nd in East Division	2	1	Lost Grey Cup
HAM	1985	8	8	0	.500	1st in East Division	1	1	Lost Grey Cup
HAM	1986	9	8	1	.529	2nd in East Division	2	1	Won Grey Cup
HAM	1987	6	6	0	.500	3rd in East Division	0	1	Lost in East Semifinal
HAM	1988	9	9	0	.500	3rd in East Division	0	1	Lost in East Semifinal
HAM	1989	12	6	0	.667	1st in East Division	1	1	Lost Grey Cup
HAM	1990	4	8	0	.33	4th in East Division	0	0	Fired
Total		56	55	3	.505	2 Division Championships	7	7	1 Grey Cup
