= Ron Lancaster =

Canadian football player and coach (1938–2008)

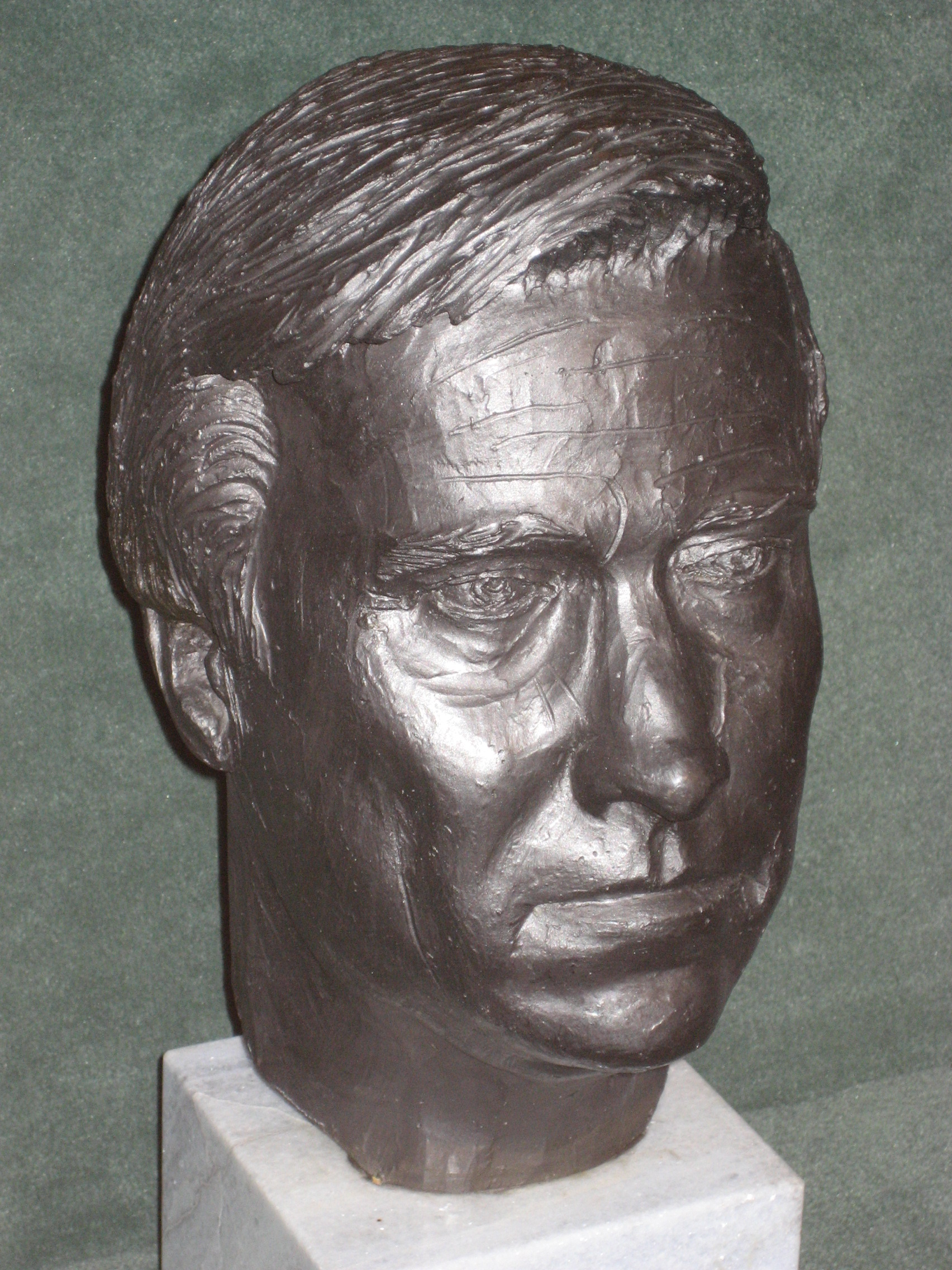
- Lancaster's bust at the Canadian Football Hall of Fame

No. 23
- Position: Quarterback

Personal information
- Born: October 14, 1938; Fairchance, Pennsylvania, U.S.
- Died: September 18, 2008 (aged 69); Hamilton, Ontario, Canada
- Listed height: 5 ft 10 in (1.78 m)
- Listed weight: 185 lb (84 kg)

Career information
- College: Wittenberg

Career history

Playing
- 1960–1962: Ottawa Rough Riders
- 1963–1978: Saskatchewan Roughriders

Coaching
- 1979–1980: Saskatchewan Roughriders
- 1991–1997: Edmonton Eskimos
- 1998–2003: Hamilton Tiger-Cats
- 2006: Hamilton Tiger-Cats

Awards and highlights
- 4× Grey Cup champion (1960, 1966, 1993, 1999); 2× CFL's Most Outstanding Player Award (1970, 1976); 5× Jeff Nicklin Memorial Trophy (1966, 1968, 1969, 1970, 1976); Tom Pate Memorial Award (1977); 2× Annis Stukus Trophy (1996, 1998); 4× CFL All-Star (1970, 1973, 1975, 1976); 7× CFL West All-Star (1966, 1968, 1969, 1970, 1973, 1975, 1976); CFL Commissioner's Award (2008); Saskatchewan Roughriders No. 23 retired
- Canadian Football Hall of Fame (Class of 1982)

Ronald Lancaster (October 14, 1938 – September 18, 2008) was an American-Canadian professional football player and coach in the Canadian Football League (CFL). As the starting quarterback for the Saskatchewan Roughriders for 16 seasons, he led the team to its first Grey Cup championship in 1966 and is the franchise's all-time leader in passing yards, attempts, completions, touchdowns, and interceptions. At the time of his retirement, he was the CFL's career leader in passing yards and still ranks sixth overall as of 2016. After his retirement as a player, he served as a head coach and general manager in the CFL; he led his teams to two Grey Cups and currently ranks fourth all-time with 142 regular season wins. He was also a colour commentator on the CFL on CBC from 1981 to 1990. At the time of his death, he was the Senior Director of Football Operations of the Hamilton Tiger-Cats. He is a member of the Canadian Football Hall of Fame (1982), Canada's Sports Hall of Fame (1985) and the Wittenberg University Athletic Hall of Honour (1985).

== Early life ==
Lancaster was born in the Pittsburgh area industrial town of Fairchance, Pennsylvania and moved to nearby Clairton as a young boy. At the time of his death, his mother still resided in Clairton.

== Playing career ==
Lancaster was a talented quarterback by the time he graduated from Clairton High School, but because he was 5′5″ (165 cm), he was ignored by most college scouts. He attended tiny Wittenberg University and led its team to a 25-8-1 record between 1956 and 1959, and two Ohio Athletic Conference championships in 1957 and 1958.

By the time he graduated from Wittenberg he had grown to 5’10". His college coach had a friend with the Ottawa Rough Riders in the Canadian Football League (CFL), and Lancaster signed with them. During his rookie season in 1960, Lancaster shared the quarterbacking duties with another future Hall of Famer, Russ Jackson, and also played defensive back. The Ottawa Rough Riders won the Grey Cup that season.

In 1963 Lancaster's playing rights were sold to the Saskatchewan Roughriders for $500 with the stipulation that if Saskatchewan ever wanted to trade him, Ottawa would have the first right of refusal.

It was with Saskatchewan that "The Little General" found his stride. In 16 seasons with the Roughriders (1963–1978), he led the team into the playoffs 14 consecutive years and made it to the CFL's Western Football Conference final 12 times. During that period, Saskatchewan played for the Grey Cup five times (1966, 1967, 1969, 1972, and 1976) and won it once, in 1966, when they defeated Lancaster's former team, the Ottawa Rough Riders, 29–14.

In Lancaster's career with the Saskatchewan Roughriders, he won 170 games as quarterback, and had only one losing record, 4–11–1 in 1978, his last season as a player.

He was the first quarterback in CFL history to reach 50,000 career passing yards, won the Schenley Award as most outstanding player in 1970 and 1976, was an All-Canadian in 1970, 1973, 1975 and 1976 and a Western all-star in 1966, 1968, 1969, 1970, 1973, 1975 and 1976.

In November 2006, the Canadian sports network TSN ranked Lancaster seventh on its list of Top 50 Players of the CFL's modern era.

At the time of his death, thirty years after his retirement as a player, he was still ranked in the top three in career statistics in a number of categories:

- second in touchdown passes (333, surpassed at the time only by Damon Allen) [Eight months after Lancaster's death, Anthony Calvillo moved past Lancaster into second place.]
- third in pass completions (3,384)
- third in pass attempts (6,233)
- third in yards passing (50,535)

== Coaching career ==
Lancaster was a player-coach of the Saskatchewan Roughriders in the 1977 and 1978 seasons and also served as Saskatchewan's offensive co-ordinator.

He became Saskatchewan's head coach in 1979 but found, as one writer put it, that "the glorious fifties and sixties were over, and he was the first Roughrider coach in sixteen years who did not have Ron Lancaster at quarterback." The Roughriders finished 2–14 in 1979 and 2-14 in 1980. Lancaster would not coach again for eleven years.

After serving as a colour commentator for The CFL on CBC from 1981 to 1990, he became head coach of the Edmonton Eskimos on February 4, 1991. From 1991 to 1997, he had a record of 83–42 in the regular season and a Grey Cup win in 1993. He passed Hugh Campbell's team record for wins on October 27, 1996.

Lancaster signed on to the Hamilton Tiger-Cats as head coach on November 26, 1997. Between 1998 and 2003, he took the team to the Grey Cup twice (1998 and 1999), winning it in 1999. On July 10, 2006, Lancaster was re-hired as the team's head coach on an interim basis after the firing of Greg Marshall.

At the time of his death, Lancaster’s 142 career regular-season wins placed him fourth on the CFL’s career regular season wins list.

== Career statistics ==
=== Playing career ===
		Passing							Rushing
Year	Team	Att	Comp	Pct	Yards	TD	Int	Rating	Att	Yards	Avg	Long	TD
1960	OTT	201	101	50.2	1,843	16	18	71.4	19	134	7.1	40	0
1961	OTT	100	49	49.0	966	9	8	79.8	17	122	7.2	23	1
1962	OTT	98	48	49.0	1,016	9	12	65.7	10	76	7.6	22	0
1963	SSK	226	106	46.9	1,727	11	19	54.2	34	139	4.1	15	2
1964	SSK	263	144	54.8	2,256	16	13	83.1	26	152	5.8	28	3
1965	SSK	305	160	52.5	2,586	17	26	64.2	33	84	2.5	20	3
1966	SSK	303	182	60.1	2,976	28	20	96.4	29	91	3.1	24	1
1967	SSK	330	169	51.2	2,809	16	24	66.1	29	131	4.5	25	2
1968	SSK	358	181	50.6	2,969	12	17	70.2	25	197	7.9	24	2
1969	SSK	354	188	53.1	3,104	25	28	73.5	22	115	5.2	48	3
1970	SSK	330	175	53.0	2,779	16	22	69.7	21	71	3.4	20	2
1971	SSK	375	192	51.2	2,759	16	23	64.1	5	0	0.0	2	0
1972	SSK	357	208	58.3	2,942	23	20	83.1	7	12	1.7	15	0
1973	SSK	464	263	56.7	3,767	22	27	74.7	8	17	2.1	13	1
1974	SSK	395	222	56.2	2,873	20	20	75.0	8	15	1.9	12	1
1975	SSK	441	239	54.2	3,545	23	27	72.6	14	11	0.8	10	0
1976	SSK	494	297	60.1	3,869	25	25	80.6	5	5	1.0	2	2
1977	SSK	449	255	56.8	3,072	14	20	69.8	14	48	3.4	9	3
1978	SSK	390	205	52.6	2,677	15	27	58.5	10	8	0.8	2	3
OTT totals		399	198	49.6	3,825	34	38	72.1	46	332	7.2	40	1
SSK totals		5,834	3,186	54.6	46,710	299	358	72.4	290	1,096	3.8	48	28
CFL totals		6,233	3,384	54.3	50,535	333	396	72.4	336	1,428	4.3	48	29

=== Head coaching record ===
Team	Year	Regular season					Postseason		
Team	Year	Won	Lost	Ties	Win %	Finish	Won	Lost	Result
SSK	1979	2	14	0	.125	5th in West Conference	–	–	Missed playoffs
SSK	1980	2	14	0	.125	5th in West Conference	–	–	Missed playoffs
SSK total		4	28	0	.125	0 West Division; Championships	-	-	0 Grey Cups
EDM	1991	12	6	0	.667	1st in West Division	0	1	Lost in Division Finals
EDM	1992	10	8	0	.556	2nd in West Division	1	1	Lost in Division Finals
EDM	1993	12	6	0	.667	2nd in West Division	3	0	Won Grey Cup
EDM	1994	13	5	0	.722	2nd in West Division	0	1	Lost in Division Semi-Finals
EDM	1995	13	5	0	.722	2nd in North Division	1	1	Lost in Division Finals
EDM	1996	11	7	0	.611	2nd in West Division	2	1	Lost in Grey Cup
EDM	1997	12	6	0	.667	1st in West Division	0	1	Lost in Division Finals
EDM total		83	43	0	.659	2 West Division; Championships	7	6	1 Grey Cup
HAM	1998	12	5	1	.694	1st in East Division	1	1	Lost in Grey Cup
HAM	1999	11	7	0	.611	2nd in East Division	3	0	Won Grey Cup
HAM	2000	9	9	0	.500	2nd in East Division	0	1	Lost in Division Semi-Finals
HAM	2001	11	7	0	.611	2nd in East Division	1	1	Lost in Division Finals
HAM	2002	7	11	0	.389	3rd in East Division	–	–	Missed playoffs
HAM	2003	1	17	0	.056	4th in East Division	–	–	Missed playoffs
HAM	2006	4	10	0	.286	4th in East Division	–	–	Missed playoffs
HAM total		55	66	1	.455	1 East Division; Championship	5	3	1 Grey Cup
Total		142	137	1	.509	2 West Division Championships 1 East Division Championship	12	9	2 Grey Cups

== Broadcasting career ==
CBC Television signed Lancaster as a colour commentator on CFL broadcasts in 1980. He was part of a trio that included Don Wittman doing the play-by-play and former Argonaut head coach Leo Cahill doing colour commentary (Cahill left after the 1985 season). He was with the CBC from 1981 to 1990 and was a member of the CBC team at the 1988 Summer Olympics in Seoul, Korea as the play-by-play broadcaster for basketball.

== Illness and death ==
In 2004, Lancaster was diagnosed with bladder cancer, but appeared to have beaten it after treatment. In 2008, he was diagnosed with lung cancer and immediately started treatment. Lancaster was positive in his outlook, saying, "Five years ago, I survived a battle with cancer, and now we have another battle on our hands. The goal is to get this taken care of and move forward just like I did five years ago. We will approach this the same way as then and I thank you all in advance for your kindness as I am on my path to recovery." Six weeks later, on September 18, 2008, Lancaster died of a heart attack. He was survived by his wife, Bev, his three children Lana, Ron, and Bob, and four grandchildren.

At the 2008 CFL season Awards ceremony on November 20, 2008, he was posthumously awarded the Commissioner's Award for outstanding contribution to the CFL by Commissioner Mark Cohon.

== See also ==
- List of gridiron football quarterbacks passing statistics
- List of Canadian Football League head coaches by wins

Preceded by Wally Buono; Wally Buono	Grey Cup winning head coach 87th Grey Cup, 1999; 81st Grey Cup, 1993	Succeeded by Steve Buratto; Dave Ritchie
