= Ted Schmitz =

Ted Schmitz is a gridiron football executive, coach, and broadcaster who currently serves as the Director of Player Personnel of the Indoor Football League's Bloomington Extreme.

Schmitz joined the Extreme in 2005 as the team's head coach. In 2008, he moved to the front office as Director of Player Personnel, but also assumed the role of Defensive Coordinator. In 2010, he returned to the head coaching position after the Extreme got off to a 3-5 under Kenton Carr. Bloomington went 6-0 under Schmitz and made the IFL playoffs.

Prior to joining the Extreme, Schmitz was an assistant at Eastern Illinois, Augustana College, Illinois State and Illinois Wesleyan and was the radio color commentator on ISU football broadcasts. Schmitz also spent eight seasons as a defensive assistant with the Hamilton Tiger-Cats and served as the interim head coach for six games during the 1987 season after head coach Al Bruno suffered a mild heart attack.

== Coaching record ==
Team	Year	Regular season					Postseason		
Team	Year	Won	Lost	Ties	Win %	Finish	Won	Lost	Result
HAM	1987	1	5	0	.167	3rd in East Division	0	0	Interim head coach
BLO	2006	5	10	0	.333	2nd in Central Division	0	0	Missed playoffs
BLO	2007	8	7	0	.533	4th in Eastern Division	1	1	Lost to Lexington Horsemen 67-49
BLO	2010	6	0	0	1.000	2nd in Central North Division	0	1	Lost to Wichita Wild 61-48
CFL Total		1	5	0	.167		0	0	
UIFL Total		13	17	0	.433		1	1	
IFL Total		6	0	0	1.000		0	1	
