= Bob O'Billovich =

American gridiron football player and coach (born 1940)

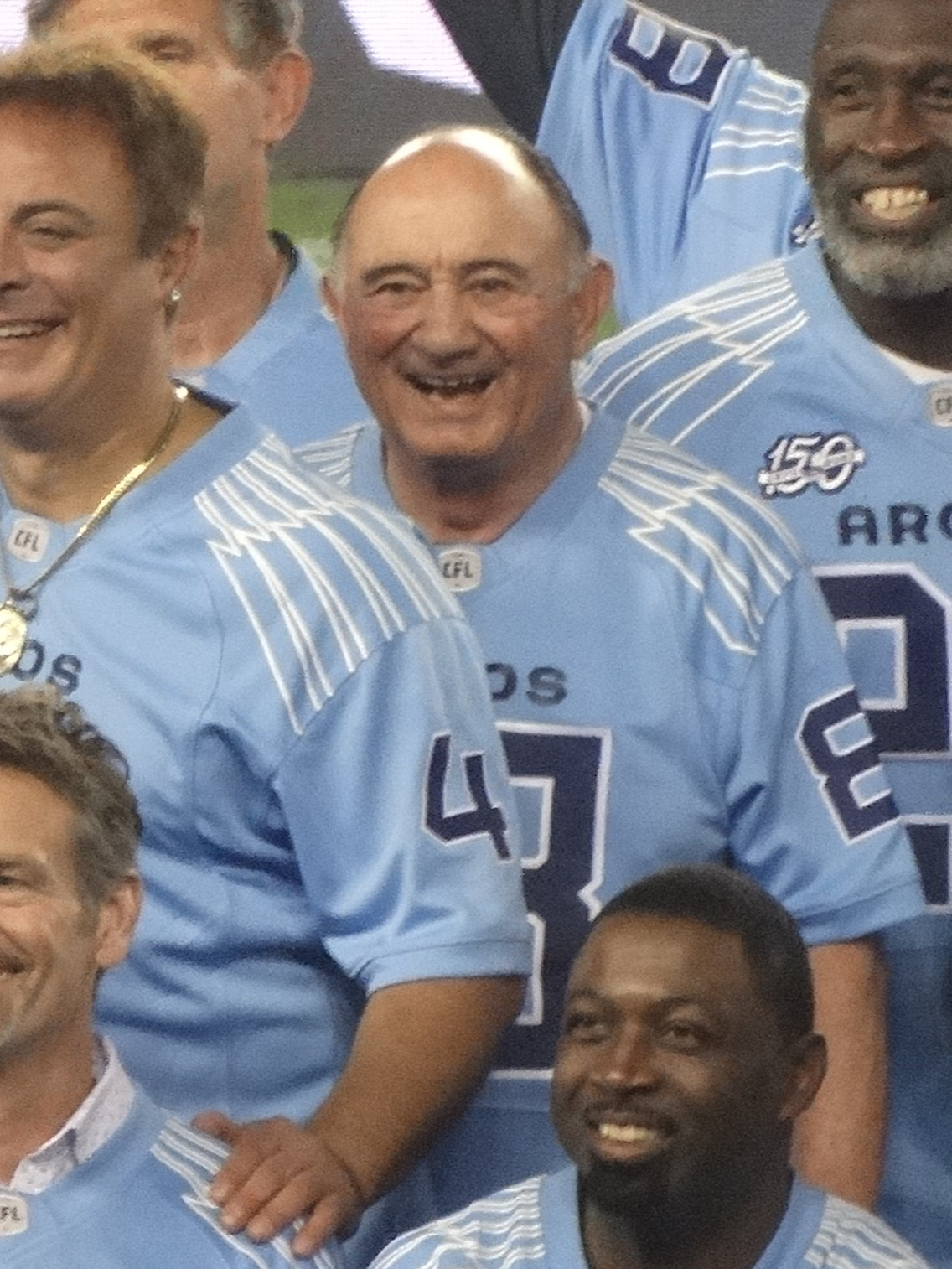
- O'Billovich in 2023

Profile
- Positions: Quarterback, Defensive back

Personal information
- Born: June 30, 1940 (age 86); Butte, Montana, U.S.
- Listed height: 5 ft 10 in (1.78 m)
- Listed weight: 182 lb (83 kg)

Career information
- College: Montana
- NFL draft: 1962: 12th round, 159 (By the St. Louis Cardinals)th overall pick

Career history

Playing
- 1963–1967: Ottawa Rough Riders

Coaching
- 1982–1989: Toronto Argonauts
- 1990–1992: BC Lions
- 1993–1994: Toronto Argonauts
- 1995: Toronto Argonauts

Operations
- 1990–1992: BC Lions (GM)
- 1994–1995: Toronto Argonauts (GM)
- 2008–2012: Hamilton Tiger-Cats (GM)

Awards and highlights
- Grey Cup champion (1983); 2× Annis Stukus Trophy (1982, 1987); CFL East All-Star (1965)
- Canadian Football Hall of Fame (Class of 2015)

Robert O'Billovich, nicknamed "Bobby O" or "Obie", (born June 30, 1940) is an east regional scout for the BC Lions of the Canadian Football League (CFL). O'Billovich has been involved with the CFL since 1963 in the roles of player, coach, general manager, scout, and several front-office positions. As a long-time coach in the CFL, he won 107 regular season games in the CFL, the eighth highest win total by a head coach in the league's history.

== Early life ==
O'Billovich was born and raised in Butte, Montana, where he was an outstanding football and basketball player at Butte High School. At Butte HS he lettered three years in basketball and two years in football; making All State in both sports. He also lettered in track and played shortstop on the Butte American Legion baseball team.

== NCAA college basketball ==
After graduating from high school in Butte, Montana, O'Billovich went to Missoula, Montana to attend Montana State University (later renamed the University of Montana). He played in the NCAA in football, basketball and baseball, where he started in all three sports for three years. O'Billovich started three years in football for Montana as a quarterback and defensive back (1959–1961). In addition, O'Billovich was a starting guard in basketball (1960–1962) and the starting shortstop in baseball for Montana (1960–1962). He was an all-Skyline Conference selection in all three sports. He also lettered at least one year in track for Montana. He was named University of Montana Athlete of the Decade for 1960–1970, and inducted to the University of Montana's Grizzly Athletic Hall of Fame in 1993.

== Professional career ==
O'Billovich began his CFL career with the Ottawa Rough Riders in 1963 as a defensive back and backup quarterback. He also served as a backup placekicker, completed his only one-point convert attempt. He recorded 24 interceptions over 69 games with the Rough Riders between 1963 and 1967 before ending his playing career.

== Basketball coaching career ==
Bob O'Billovich was coach of the Carleton University Ravens CIAU men's basketball team from 1971 to 1973. From 1973 to 1974, O'Billovich served as head coach for the University of Ottawa Gee-Gees men's basketball team.

== Football administrative career ==
In 1974, O'Billovich launched his CFL coaching career with the Rough Riders, first as a guest coach, and then assistant coach.

O'Billovich was named head coach of the Toronto Argonauts in 1982, a position he held until 1989. During his tenure at Toronto, the Argonauts appeared in the Grey Cup three times (1982, 1983, 1987), winning the Cup in 1983. He was honoured as CFL Coach of the Year in 1982 and 1987.

Bob O'Billovich joined the BC Lions in midseason on September 14, 1990, as general manager and interim coach. The Lions had been off to a dismal 2–8-1 start that season; they finished the season with an improved 6–11-1 record. O'Billovich remained as head coach of the Lions through the end of the 1992 season, a year in which the Lions finished at 3–15.

In 1993, O'Billovich returned to the Argonauts as general manager. The Argos began that season poorly, and O'Billovich took over as head coach on September 10, 1993. He coached for the remainder of the 1993 season and for the entirety of the 1994 season. At the end of the 1994 season, O'Billovich relinquished the head coach position to concentrate on his general manager duties. The Argos again had a poor start for the 1995 season and O'Billovich took over as head coach for the final nine games after firing Mike Faragalli; the team finished the season with a lackluster 4–14 record. He finished with 89 career regular season wins as a head coach of the Argonauts, which is the most in franchise history.

O'Billovich was director of player personnel with the Lions from 2003 to 2007. In December 2007, O'Billovich was hired as general manager by the Hamilton Tiger-Cats. On January 12, 2012, the Hamilton Tiger-Cats announced his promotion to Vice President of football operations. On December 17, 2012, Kent Austin replaced O'Billovich as the Tiger-Cats' GM when he was also hired as the team's new head coach.

He was inducted into the Canadian Football Hall of Fame in 2015.

== CFL coaching record ==
Team	Year	Regular season					Postseason		
Team	Year	Won	Lost	Ties	Win %	Finish	Won	Lost	Result
TOR	1982	9	6	1	.600	1st in East Division	1	1	Lost in Grey Cup
TOR	1983	12	4	0	.750	1st in East Division	2	0	Won Grey Cup
TOR	1984	9	6	1	.600	1st in East Division	0	1	Lost in East Final
TOR	1985	6	10	0	.375	4th in East Division	-	-	Failed to Qualify
TOR	1986	10	8	0	.555	1st in East Division	1	1	Lost in East Final
TOR	1987	11	6	1	.647	2nd in East Division	2	1	Lost in Grey Cup
TOR	1988	14	4	0	.777	1st in East Division	0	1	Lost in East Final
TOR	1989	7	11	0	.388	2nd in East Division	0	1	Lost in East Semi-Final
BC	1990	4	3	0	.571	4th in West Division	-	-	Failed to Qualify
BC	1991	11	7	0	.611	3rd in West Division	0	1	Lost in West Semi-Final
BC	1992	3	15	0	.166	4th in West Division	-	-	Failed to Qualify
TOR	1993	2	6	0	.250	4th in East Division	-	-	Failed to Qualify
TOR	1994	7	11	0	.388	3rd in East Division	0	1	Lost in East Semi-Final
TOR	1995	2	7	0	.222	7th in North Division	-	-	Failed to Qualify
Total		107	104	3	.507	5 Division Championships	6	8	1 Grey Cup

== CFL GM record ==
Team	Year	Regular season					Postseason		
Team	Year	Won	Lost	Ties	Win %	Finish	Won	Lost	Result
BC	1990	4	3	0	.571	4th in West Division	-	-	Failed to Qualify
BC	1991	11	7	0	.611	3rd in West Division	0	1	Lost in West Semi-Final
BC	1992	3	15	0	.166	4th in West Division	-	-	Failed to Qualify
TOR	1993	2	6	0	.250	4th in East Division	-	-	Failed to Qualify
TOR	1994	7	11	0	.388	3rd in East Division	0	1	Lost in East Semi-Final
TOR	1995	4	14	0	.222	7th in North Division	-	-	Failed to Qualify
HAM	2008	3	15	0	.166	4th in East Division	–	–	Missed playoffs
HAM	2009	9	9	0	.500	2nd in East Division	0	1	Lost East Semi-Final
HAM	2010	9	9	0	.500	2nd in East Division	0	1	Lost East Semi-Final
HAM	2011	8	10	0	.444	3rd in East Division	1	1	Lost East Final
HAM	2012	6	12	0	.333	3rd in East Division	-	-	Failed to Qualify
Total		66	111	0	.372	0 Division Championships	1	5	0 Grey Cups

== Achievements ==
- University of Montana Athlete of the Decade (1960–1970)
- Inducted to the University of Montana Grizzly Athletic Hall of Fame in 1993
- CFL Coach of the Year (1982, 1987)
- Grey Cup champion coach (1983)
- All-time winningest coach for the Argonauts (89–79–3 in 11 seasons)

== Personal life ==
O'Billovich lives in Oakville, Ontario, married to wife Judy from Ottawa where their children, Tracy, Jodi, and Coy, were born. His younger brother, Jack "Mad Dog" O'Billovich, who died in 1995 of a heart condition, was an All-American at Oregon State who helped OSU get to the Rose Bowl in 1965.
