= Tag Rome =

American football player (born 1961)

No. 4, 23, 82
- Position: Wide receiver

Personal information
- Born: August 13, 1961 (age 65); Donaldsonville, Louisiana, U.S.
- Listed height: 5 ft 9 in (1.75 m)
- Listed weight: 175 lb (79 kg)

Career information
- High school: Cedar Creek (Ruston, Louisiana)
- College: Northeast Louisiana
- NFL draft: 1984: undrafted

Career history
- San Diego Chargers (1984)*; Edmonton Eskimos (1984); Calgary Stampeders (1985–1986); San Diego Chargers (1987)
- * Offseason or practice squad member only
- Stats at Pro Football Reference

Anthony Nicholas "Tag" Rome (born August 13, 1961) is an American former professional football player who was a wide receiver for the San Diego Chargers of the National Football League (NFL). He played college football for the Northeast Louisiana Indians.

== Early life ==
Anthony Nicholas Rome was born on August 13, 1961, in Donaldsonville, Louisiana. He attended Cedar Creek School in Ruston, Louisiana.

== College career ==
Rome enrolled at Northeast Louisiana University to play college football for the Indians. He joined the team as a walk-on. He was named an honorable mention All-American in 1982 and 1983. Rome finished his college career as the school's all-time receiving leader with 177 receptions for 1,763 yards and 10 touchdowns. He was inducted into Northeast Louisiana's athletics hall of fame in 1996.

== Professional career ==
After going undrafted in the 1984 NFL draft, Rome signed with the San Diego Chargers on May 5, 1984. He was released on August 27 before the start of the 1984 regular season.

Rome was signed by the Edmonton Eskimos of the Canadian Football League (CFL) on October 14, 1984. He played in the final two games of the 1984 regular season for the Eskimos and caught eight passes for 113 yards. He was released on June 22, 1985, during the preseason.

Rome signed with the CFL's Calgary Stampeders on July 14, 1985. He played in 11 games for Calgary in 1985, totaling 25 receptions for 410 yards, five kick returns for 102 yards, and 30 punt returns for 214 yards. He was released on July 31, 1986, before being re-signed on September 15 and released again on September 23. Rome played in six games overall for the Stampeders during the 1986 season, catching 15 passes for 253 yards while also returning 16 punts for 103 yards.

On November 10, 1986, Rome signed a futures contract with the Chargers. He was released on August 29, 1987. On September 28, Rome was re-signed by the Chargers during the 1987 NFL players strike. He played in all three strike games, starting one, for the Chargers, recording six catches for 49 yards on eight targets, two kick returns for 28 yards, and three punt returns for 12 yards. He was released on October 19, 1987, after the strike ended.

== Post-playing career ==
Rome was an assistant football coach at Northeast Louisiana from 1989 to 1993, spending time as both a receivers coach and recruiting coordinator. He later opened his own State Farm insurance agency.
