= Troy Bodine =

Canadian football player (born 1963)

Troy Bodine (born June 21, 1963) is a former Canadian football quarterback in the Canadian Football League who played for the Ottawa Rough Riders. He played college football for the Cincinnati Bearcats.
