= Annis Stukus Trophy =

Canadian Football League trophy

The Annis Stukus Trophy is a Canadian Football League trophy, which is presented annually by the Edmonton Eskimos Alumni Association to the Coach of the Year, as determined by the members of the Football Reporters of Canada. The Trophy is named after former player, coach, and general manager Annis Stukus.

The Stukus Trophy was typically the last trophy to be awarded in the CFL season, which was awarded at league meetings several months after the season had ended. Additionally, three coaches were nominated for the award, regardless of division. In 2015, the format changed so that there was a West and an East division representative and the award was given during Grey Cup week.

== Annis Stukus Trophy winners ==
- 2025 – Corey Mace, Saskatchewan Roughriders
- 2024 – Jason Maas, Montreal Alouettes
- 2023 – Ryan Dinwiddie, Toronto Argonauts
- 2022 – Mike O'Shea, Winnipeg Blue Bombers
- 2021 – Mike O'Shea, Winnipeg Blue Bombers
- 2020 – Season cancelled due to the COVID-19 pandemic
- 2019 – Orlondo Steinauer, Hamilton Tiger-Cats
- 2018 – Chris Jones, Saskatchewan Roughriders
- 2017 – Marc Trestman, Toronto Argonauts
- 2016 – Dave Dickenson, Calgary Stampeders
- 2015 – Rick Campbell, Ottawa Redblacks
- 2014 – John Hufnagel, Calgary Stampeders
- 2013 – Corey Chamblin, Saskatchewan Roughriders
- 2012 – Scott Milanovich, Toronto Argonauts
- 2011 – Wally Buono, BC Lions
- 2010 – Jim Barker, Toronto Argonauts
- 2009 – Marc Trestman, Montreal Alouettes
- 2008 – John Hufnagel, Calgary Stampeders
- 2007 – Kent Austin, Saskatchewan Roughriders
- 2006 – Wally Buono, BC Lions
- 2005 – Tom Higgins, Calgary Stampeders
- 2004 – Greg Marshall, Hamilton Tiger-Cats
- 2003 – Tom Higgins, Edmonton Eskimos
- 2002 – Don Matthews, Montreal Alouettes
- 2001 – Dave Ritchie, Winnipeg Blue Bombers
- 2000 – Charlie Taaffe, Montreal Alouettes
- 1999 – Charlie Taaffe, Montreal Alouettes
- 1998 – Ron Lancaster, Hamilton Tiger-Cats
- 1997 – Don Matthews, Toronto Argonauts
- 1996 – Ron Lancaster, Edmonton Eskimos
- 1995 – Don Matthews, Baltimore Stallions
- 1994 – Don Matthews, Baltimore CFLers
- 1993 – Wally Buono, Calgary Stampeders
- 1992 – Wally Buono, Calgary Stampeders
- 1991 – Adam Rita, Toronto Argonauts
- 1990 – Mike Riley, Winnipeg Blue Bombers
- 1989 – John Gregory, Saskatchewan Roughriders
- 1988 – Mike Riley, Winnipeg Blue Bombers
- 1987 – Bob O'Billovich, Toronto Argonauts
- 1986 – Al Bruno, Hamilton Tiger-Cats
- 1985 – Don Matthews, BC Lions
- 1984 – Cal Murphy, Winnipeg Blue Bombers
- 1983 – Cal Murphy, Winnipeg Blue Bombers
- 1982 – Bob O'Billovich, Toronto Argonauts
- 1981 – Joe Faragalli, Saskatchewan Roughriders
- 1980 – Ray Jauch, Winnipeg Blue Bombers
- 1979 – Hugh Campbell, Edmonton Eskimos
- 1978 – Jack Gotta, Calgary Stampeders
- 1977 – Vic Rapp, BC Lions
- 1976 – Bob Shaw, Hamilton Tiger-Cats
- 1975 – George Brancato, Ottawa Rough Riders
- 1974 – Marv Levy, Montreal Alouettes
- 1973 – Jack Gotta, Ottawa Rough Riders
- 1972 – Jack Gotta, Ottawa Rough Riders
- 1971 – Leo Cahill, Toronto Argonauts
- 1970 – Ray Jauch, Edmonton Eskimos
- 1969 – Frank Clair, Ottawa Rough Riders
- 1968 – Eagle Keys, Saskatchewan Roughriders
- 1967 – Jerry Williams, Calgary Stampeders
- 1966 – Frank Clair, Ottawa Rough Riders
- 1965 – Bud Grant, Winnipeg Blue Bombers
- 1964 – Ralph Sazio, Hamilton Tiger-Cats
- 1963 – Dave Skrien, BC Lions
- 1962 – Steve Owen, Saskatchewan Roughriders
- 1961 – Jim Trimble, Hamilton Tiger-Cats
