= Mark Napiorkowski =

Canadian gridiron football player (born 1962)

No. 79
- Positions: Defensive tackle, Defensive end

Personal information
- Born: August 24, 1962 (age 64); Oshawa, Ontario, Canada
- Listed height: 6 ft 4 in (1.93 m)
- Listed weight: 240 lb (109 kg)

Career information
- College: British Columbia

Career history
- 1985-1986: BC Lions
- 1986-1990: Hamilton Tiger-Cats
- 1991-1992: Toronto Argonauts

Awards and highlights
- 2× Grey Cup champion (1986, 1991)

Mark Napiorkowski (born August 24, 1962) is a Canadian former professional football defensive lineman who played eight seasons in the Canadian Football League (CFL).
