= Don Matthews =

Professional head coach of several football teams

Biographical details
- Born: June 22, 1939; Amesbury, Massachusetts, U.S.
- Died: June 14, 2017 (aged 77); Beaverton, Oregon, U.S.

Playing career
- 1960–1963: Idaho
- Position: Linebacker

Coaching career (HC unless noted)
- 1964: Idaho (GA)
- 1965: Ely HS (NV) (assistant)
- 1966–1968: Ely (NV) HS
- 1969–1970: Joel E. Ferris HS (WA)
- 1971–1972: Idaho (OL)
- 1973: Idaho (OC)
- 1974–1976: Sunset HS (OR)
- 1977: Edmonton Eskimos (LB)
- 1978–1982: Edmonton Eskimos (DC)
- 1983–1987: BC Lions
- 1989: Edmonton Eskimos (DC)
- 1990: Toronto Argonauts
- 1991: Orlando Thunder
- 1991–1993: Saskatchewan Roughriders
- 1994–1995: Baltimore Stallions
- 1996–1998: Toronto Argonauts
- 1999–2000: Edmonton Eskimos
- 2002–2006: Montreal Alouettes
- 2008: Toronto Argonauts

Head coaching record
- Overall: 231–132–1 (CFL); 5–5 (WLAF)

Accomplishments and honors

Championships
- Grey Cups (5): 73rd, 83rd, 84th, 85th, 90th

Awards
- CFL Coach of the Year (5) 1985, 1994, 1995, 1997, and 2002.

Records
- 2nd highest win total by CFL coach

Donald J. "The Don" Matthews (June 22, 1939 – June 14, 2017) was a head coach of several professional football teams, mostly in the Canadian Football League (CFL). He won 231 games in the CFL, the second highest win total by a head coach in the league's history while the first and so far only coach to lead four teams to Grey Cup victories. He was inducted into the Canadian Football Hall of Fame in September 2011.

== Early life and college ==
Matthews was born in Amesbury, Massachusetts, the son of Canadian-born parents, Ida (Babin), from Tracadie, New Brunswick, and Fred Matthews, a steel mill worker from Prince Edward Island. From a large family of limited means and education, he quit high school in Amesbury after his senior season of football in 1956 and served three years in the U.S. Marine Corps.

Matthews returned home and earned his high school diploma and then on the advice of a teacher, ventured west in 1960 as a 21-year-old freshman to Moscow, Idaho. He walked-on at Idaho as a linebacker on the freshman team; he was awarded a scholarship by varsity head coach Skip Stahley after his first semester. He earned three letters and was a team captain in his senior season of 1963, when the Vandals, in their second year under Dee Andros, achieved their first winning season in a quarter century. Matthews graduated from the University of Idaho with a degree in education in 1964.

== Early career ==
Matthews was a graduate assistant for the Vandals in Moscow for the 1964 season under Andros and freshman coach Bud Riley. Matthews then coached high school football in Nevada at Ely for four years and won a state title. He relocated to Eastern Washington at Spokane in 1969 as head coach at Ferris, where he led the Saxons to the city title in his second and final year.

Matthews became a collegiate assistant coach back at his alma mater in 1971 as offensive line coach (later as offensive coordinator), under second-year head coach Don Robbins. After an 0–2 start, the Vandals finished at 8–3, which included an eight-game winning streak, and won the Big Sky title. At the time it was the best record in school history, and three seniors were selected in the 1972 NFL draft. Two years later, Robbins was fired following the 1973 season and Matthews moved to the Portland area. He took over a winless program at Sunset High School in Beaverton and won consecutive state championships in 1975 and 1976, going undefeated in his third and final year. He left Sunset after the 1976 season to become a CFL assistant coach in Edmonton, Alberta.

== Pro coaching career ==
=== Edmonton Eskimos (first stint) ===
In 1977, Edmonton Eskimos Head Coach, Hugh Campbell, hired Matthews for his first professional football coaching job. Matthews worked with the team's linebackers that year.

In 1978, Campbell promoted Matthews to defensive coordinator.

From 1977 to 1982, Edmonton went to 6 consecutive Grey Cups and won the final 5 in a row. During this time, 3 Edmonton defensive players won the CFL's Most Outstanding Defensive Player Award: Danny Kepley in 1977, 1980, and 1981, Dave "Dr. Death" Fennell in 1978, and James "Quick" Parker in 1982.

=== BC Lions ===
In 1983, Matthews was hired as the head coach of the BC Lions by general manager Bob Ackles. That year, the Lions started playing games at BC Place Stadium. In their first home game of the season, against Saskatchewan, Matthews called for an onside kick on the opening kickoff, and BC recovered. BC finished first in the West, and defeated Winnipeg Blue Bombers in the West Final, which qualified the Lions to play in the Grey Cup in their home stadium. Unfortunately for them, they lost the Grey Cup to the Toronto Argonauts.

In 1984, BC finished first in the West once again. James "Quick" Parker won the CFL's Most Outstanding Defensive Player Award. BC lost the West Final to the eventual champions, the Winnipeg Blue Bombers.

In 1985, BC finished with a league-best 13–3 record. Matthews won his first Coach of the Year Award and Mervyn Fernandez won the CFL's Most Outstanding Player Award. BC defeated the Blue Bombers in the West Final, and won their first Grey Cup since 1964.

In 1986, BC finished second in the West Division. Parker once again won the CFL's Most Outstanding Defensive Player Award. BC met Winnipeg in the playoffs at BC Place for the fourth consecutive season, this time in the West Semi-Final. BC defeated Winnipeg, but lost to the first place Edmonton Eskimos in the West Final.

In 1987, Matthews started the season as BC's head coach, but was fired during the season and replaced by Larry Donovan.

=== Edmonton Eskimos (second stint) ===
Matthews became a defensive assistant coach with Edmonton in 1989. The Eskimos finished a league-record 16–2. Eight of Edmonton's defensive players were named West Division All-Stars, of whom five were CFL All-Stars. Danny Bass won the CFL's Most Outstanding Defensive Player Award. Edmonton was defeated by Saskatchewan in the West Final.

=== Toronto Argonauts (first stint) ===
In 1990, Matthews was hired by the Toronto Argonauts to be their head coach. He guided the team to second place in the East Division. Mike "Pinball" Clemons won the CFL's Most Outstanding Player Award. The Argonauts lost 20–17 in the East Final to the eventual Grey Cup champion Winnipeg Blue Bombers.

=== Orlando Thunder ===
Matthews was the head coach of the Orlando Thunder of the World League of American Football in 1991.

=== Saskatchewan Roughriders ===
In August 1991, the Saskatchewan Roughriders fired their head coach, John Gregory. Matthews was hired as his replacement. The team missed the playoffs in 1991, but qualified in 1992 and 1993, only to lose both years to Edmonton in the West Semi-Final. In 1992, Kent Austin led the CFL in passing yards, and became the second quarterback in CFL history to pass for 6,000 yards in a season. In 1993, Jearld Baylis won the CFL's Most Outstanding Defensive Player Award.

=== Baltimore CFLers and Stallions ===
In 1994, the new Baltimore CFL franchise hired Matthews as head coach. Baltimore finished 12-6 and went to the Grey Cup, only to lose to BC in their own stadium.

In 1995, Baltimore finished 15–3, and defeated the Calgary Stampeders in the Grey Cup.

=== Toronto Argonauts (second stint) ===
In 1996, Matthews coached the Toronto Argonauts to a league-best 15–3 record, reversing their 4–14 record from the year before. Doug Flutie won the CFL's Most Outstanding Player Award. They won the Grey Cup against Edmonton and Flutie was the MVP of the game.

In 1997, Matthews coached the Argonauts to a league-best 15–3 record once again. Flutie won the CFL's Most Outstanding Player Award again. Toronto defeated Saskatchewan in the Grey Cup and Flutie was once again name the MVP of the game.

In 1998, the Argonauts finished 9-9. Derrell Mitchell gained exactly 2,000 yards receiving. The Argonauts lost the East Semi-Final to the Montreal Alouettes.

=== Edmonton Eskimos (third stint) ===
In 1999, Matthews was hired by Edmonton for his third stint with the team, but his first as head coach. Edmonton finished 6–12, but was able to qualify for the playoffs for a CFL record 28th consecutive season. Edmonton lost to Calgary in the West Semi-Final.

In 2000, Edmonton improved its record to 10-8 and second place in the West. However, Edmonton would lose in the West Semi Final to the eventual Grey Cup champions, the BC Lions.

After coaching the Eskimos for two seasons, Matthews resigned as head coach just prior to the team's first preseason game on June 18, 2001.

=== Montreal Alouettes ===
In 2002, Matthews was hired by the Montreal Alouettes, and coach the team to a CFL best 13–5 record. The Alouettes won their first Grey Cup since 1977 by defeating Matthews' former team, the Edmonton Eskimos in Edmonton's Commonwealth Stadium.

In 2003, Montreal finished with a league-best 13–5 record again, but lost the Grey Cup this time to Edmonton.

In 2004, Montreal finished with a league-best 14–4 record, but lost the East Final to the eventual Grey Cup champions, the Toronto Argonauts.

In 2005, Montreal finished second in the East Division, defeated the Saskatchewan Roughriders in the crossover East Semi-Final, and went into Toronto and defeated the Argonauts in the East Final. In the Grey Cup, the Alouettes lost in overtime to Edmonton.

In October 2006, Matthews stepped down as head coach of the Alouettes expressing undisclosed health issues that were "affecting his ability to perform".

=== Toronto Argonauts (third stint) ===
Don Matthews returned to Toronto on September 9, 2008, as the interim coach for the Argonauts, after they started the season with a 4–6 record. In that press conference, Matthews revealed that the major health reason that caused him to step down as head coach of the Alouettes was an anxiety disorder. He also went further to say that he had been prescribed to some medication and the anxiety attacks are now under control. On October 31, 2008, he resigned from the Argonauts a day after the conclusion of the Argonauts 2008 regular season, which saw the Argos fail to win a game in the eight games under his leadership and finishing out of the playoffs for the first time since the 2001 CFL season.

=== Consultant ===
In May 2008, Matthews was announced as an advisor to the Jeff Hunt-led group's conditional Ottawa franchise.

The Montreal Alouettes announced on July 30, 2014, that Matthews had joined the team in a coaching consultant role for the second consecutive year.

=== Legacy ===
When Matthews' head coaching career was complete, he was the winningest head coach in CFL history. He won 10 total Grey Cups, 5 of which came when he was an assistant coach in Edmonton. The other 5 came when he was a head coach, which tied the CFL record for most Grey Cup wins as a head coach.

Matthews' coaching style in the CFL was termed "living on the edge" by employing “wide open offensive football, and attacking, in-your-face, defensive football.” He wanted to put his players in the right situations by making things simple for them and allowing them to play fast. Under Matthews, three quarterbacks passed for 5,000 yards: Kent Austin, Doug Flutie, and Anthony Calvillo, with Austin and Calvillo each having a 6,000-yard season under Matthews.

He was selected for induction in the Builder category into the Canadian Football Hall of Fame on February 10, 2011.

== Coaching records ==
Don Matthews holds several head coaching records:

- Most Grey Cup appearances (9 – tied)
- Most Grey Cup wins (5 – tied)

He also has an additional five Grey Cup titles as defensive co-ordinator of the Edmonton Eskimos.

=== CFL head coaching record ===
Source: statscrew.com

Team	Year	Regular season					Postseason		
Team	Year	Won	Lost	Ties	Win %	Finish	Won	Lost	Result
BC	1983	11	5	0	.688	1st in West Division	1	1	Lost in Grey Cup
BC	1984	12	3	1	.800	1st in West Division	0	1	Lost in Division Finals
BC	1985	13	3	0	.813	1st in West Division	2	0	Won Grey Cup
BC	1986	12	6	0	.667	2nd in West Division	1	1	Lost in Division Finals
BC	1987	8	6	0	.573	1st in West Division	–	–	(fired)
TOR	1990	10	8	0	.556	2nd in East Division	1	1	Lost in Division Finals
SSK	1991	5	6	0	.455	4th in West Division	–	–	Missed playoffs
SSK	1992	9	9	0	.500	3rd in West Division	0	1	Lost in Division Semi-Finals
SSK	1993	11	7	0	.611	3rd in West Division	0	1	Lost in Division Semi-Finals
BAL	1994	12	6	0	.667	2nd in East Division	2	1	Lost in Grey Cup
BAL	1995	15	3	0	.833	1st in South Division	3	0	Won Grey Cup
TOR	1996	15	3	0	.833	1st in East Division	2	0	Won Grey Cup
TOR	1997	15	3	0	.833	1st in East Division	2	0	Won Grey Cup
TOR	1998	9	9	0	.500	3rd in East Division	0	1	Lost in Division Semi-Finals
EDM	1999	6	12	0	.333	3rd in West Division	0	1	Lost in Division Semi-Finals
EDM	2000	10	8	0	.556	2nd in West Division	0	1	Lost in Division Semi-Finals
MTL	2002	13	5	0	.722	1st in East Division	2	0	Won Grey Cup
MTL	2003	13	5	0	.722	1st in East Division	1	1	Lost in Grey Cup
MTL	2004	14	4	0	.778	1st in East Division	0	1	Lost in Division Finals
MTL	2005	10	8	0	.556	2nd in East Division	2	1	Lost in Grey Cup
MTL	2006	8	6	0	.571	1st in East Division	–	–	(stepped down)
TOR	2008	0	8	0	.000	3rd in East Division	–	–	missed playoffs
	Team totals								
BC	1983–1987	56	23	1	.700	4 West Division; Championships	4	3	1 Grey Cup
TOR	1990, 1996– 1998, 2008	49	31	0	.613	2 East Division; Championships	5	2	2 Grey Cups
SSK	1991–1993	25	22	0	.532	0 West Division; Championships	0	2	0 Grey Cups
BAL	1994–1995	27	9	0	.750	1 South Division; Championship	5	1	1 Grey Cup
EDM	1999–2000	16	20	0	.444	0 West Division; Championships	0	2	0 Grey Cups
MTL	2002–2006	58	28	0	.674	4 East Division; Championships	5	2	1 Grey Cup
Total		231	133	1	.633	11 Division; Championships	19	13	5 Grey Cups

== Personal ==
Matthews' mother, Ida, was a francophone from Tracadie, New Brunswick, while his father, Fred, was from Prince Edward Island. Had current Canadian nationality laws been in effect in 1939, Matthews would have become a Canadian citizen under the principle of jus sanguines, but separate Canadian citizenship was not enacted until 1947 and was not extended retroactively to anyone born outside the country prior to 1947. In 2004, Matthews became a naturalized Canadian citizen.

Matthews had three sons and six grandchildren. He lived in Beaverton, Oregon, with his wife Stephanie and stepson Blaze.

On November 5, 2012, Matthews announced he was battling cancer and therefore would not be able to participate in any of the festivities for the 100th Grey Cup in Toronto.

After a long 5-year battle with cancer, Matthews died on June 14, 2017.

== See also ==
- List of Canadian Football League head coaches by wins
- List of National Football League head coaches with 200 wins

Awards
Preceded by Wally Buono; Don Matthews; Don Matthews; Dave Ritchie; Cal Murphy	Grey Cup–winning head coach 90th Grey Cup, 2002; 85th Grey Cup, 1997; 84th Grey Cup, 1996; 83rd Grey Cup, 1995; 73rd Grey Cup, 1985	Succeeded by Tom Higgins; Wally Buono; Don Matthews; Don Matthews; Al Bruno
