= Bud Riley =

American football coach

Biographical details
- Born: November 25, 1925; Guin, Alabama, U.S.
- Died: August 4, 2012 (aged 86); Penticton, British Columbia, Canada

Playing career
- 1948–1950: Idaho
- Position: Back

Coaching career (HC unless noted)
- 1952–1954: Wallace HS (ID) (assistant)
- 1955–1958: Wallace HS (ID)
- 1959–1961: Lewiston HS (ID)
- 1962–1964: Idaho (assistant)
- 1965–1972: Oregon State (assistant)
- 1973: Saskatchewan Roughriders (assistant)
- 1974–1977: Winnipeg Blue Bombers
- 1978: Toronto Argonauts (assistant)
- 1979: Oregon State (assistant)
- 1980: Saskatchewan Roughriders (assistant)
- 1981: Hamilton Tiger-Cats (assistant)
- 1982–1983: Hamilton Tiger-Cats
- 1984: Edmonton Eskimos (assistant)
- 1985: Calgary Stampeders (interim HC)
- Military career
- Allegiance: United States
- Branch: United States Navy
- Conflicts: World War II

Edward Jones "Bud" Riley Jr. (November 25, 1925 – August 4, 2012) was an American college football coach who served as an assistant coach at the University of Idaho and Oregon State University.

Riley also spent 14 seasons in the Canadian Football League (CFL), most notably as head coach of the Winnipeg Blue Bombers from 1974 to 1977 and as a front office executive for the Calgary Stampeders from 1985 to 1987. His oldest son Mike Riley was the head coach at Oregon State and Nebraska.

== Early life ==
Riley was born and raised in Guin, Alabama, a community in the western part of the state. His father died when he was 12, and he quit high school at age 17 during World War II to join the U.S. Navy. Following the war, he returned to western Alabama and later enrolled at nearby East Mississippi Junior College in Scooba.

== College career ==
Riley's junior college football prowess in his early 20s led him to the attention of University of Idaho head football coach Dixie Howell, a hall of fame player in the 1930s from Alabama, who was tipped off by a friend. Riley, at 5 ft 10 in (1.78 m) and 155 lb (70 kg), informed Howell he was significantly larger than he actually was, which earned him an invitation to campus. Upon his arrival in Moscow in 1948, Howell wanted the undersized Riley to run off; though he had an assistant coach place Riley in a post-practice tackling drill with a much larger player, Riley prevailed and stayed on the team.

He played halfback for the Vandals in the Pacific Coast Conference from 1948 to 1950 under Howell. In the home opener against Oregon in 1948, Riley scored the Vandals' only touchdown in a 15–8 loss in his first game at Neale Stadium. The 1948 Ducks featured Norm Van Brocklin and John McKay, and finished the regular season at 9–1 as PCC co-champions. Riley also played for the Vandals' baseball team.

== Early coaching years ==
=== High school ===
During his college summers and vacations, Riley had worked in the mines of the nearby Silver Valley at Wallace, and landed a job there with a mining company following graduation at age 26 in 1952. The school superintendent was short-handed for instructors and asked him to fill in as a teacher, and he agreed to try it on an interim basis, with the mining company's permission. After growing up in a tough environment, Riley admired the hard-nosed grit of the mining community and found he liked teaching and coaching, and never returned to mining. He started as an assistant coach in football and basketball and the head coach in baseball. He was the head football coach at WHS for four seasons, starting in 1955, leading the Miners to a 23-14-1 record. He was also the head coach in basketball for two seasons, starting in the fall of 1957. Riley met his wife, Mary Shumaker from nearby Mullan, while working in Wallace; they were married in November 1951 and their first two sons were born there. They left Wallace in 1959 for Lewiston, where he was the head football coach at Lewiston High School for three years. His overall record with the LHS Bengals was 15–14–1, with a final season of 1–8 due to disciplinary actions.

=== College ===
In May 1962, he moved up to the collegiate ranks and joined the coaching staff at his alma mater, the University of Idaho, under first-year head coach Dee Andros. The Vandals posted their first winning record in a quarter century in 1963, and in 1964 they beat neighbor WSU for the first time in a decade and barely lost the week before at Rose Bowl-bound Oregon State 10–7 on a second half punt return. When Tommy Prothro left OSU for UCLA, Andros moved over to Oregon State and the Pac-8 in February 1965, Riley followed him to Corvallis as the secondary coach, later defensive coordinator, from 1965 to 1972. The best years were 1967 ("Giant Killers") and 1968, when the Beavers were nationally ranked.

== CFL coach ==
After eight seasons in Corvallis, Riley moved to the Canadian Football League (CFL) in 1973, as defensive coordinator of the Saskatchewan Roughriders, where he made significant improvements to a poorly rated defense. Riley was hired as the head coach of the Winnipeg Blue Bombers in 1974; head coach Jim Spavital was fired after the Blue Bombers finished last in the Western Conference in 1973. The Bombers didn't make it out of the first round in Riley's three postseason appearances, and he was let go after the 1977 season. His next coaching job was as an assistant with the Toronto Argonauts. He replaced the fired Leo Cahill as head coach with seven games remaining, finishing with a 1-6 record.

He returned to Oregon State in 1979 as an assistant to Craig Fertig, but Fertig was fired by Andros midway through the season. Riley returned to the CFL in 1980, as the defensive backs coach for Saskatchewan. In January 1981, he was hired by the Hamilton Tiger-Cats as the defensive coordinator under head coach Frank Kush, and was promoted to head coach for the 1982 season. He lasted only halfway into his second season before being replaced by director of player personnel Al Bruno.

Riley spent the 1984 season as defensive co-ordinator for the Edmonton Eskimos. He moved to the front office in 1985, serving as the Calgary Stampeders player personnel director for three seasons. He also served as interim coach for the remainder of the 1985 season after the firing of head coach Steve Buratto, (whom Riley had recruited to Idaho as a player).

He was inducted into the Idaho Athletic Hall of Fame in 1998.

== Personal life ==
Riley and his wife Mary (Shumaker) of Mullan, Idaho, had three sons: Mike (b.1953), Ed (b.1958), and Pete (b.1964). Mike spent his junior high and high school years in Corvallis and was midway through college at Alabama when his father left OSU and became a nomadic coach in the CFL in 1973. The younger sons, specifically Pete, attended many different schools, primarily in Canada, in the 1970s and early 1980s: both went to four high schools, in four different cities during their high school years. Ed spent his senior year at Gonzaga Prep in Spokane, and then went to Whitworth College.

His brother Hayden (1921–1995) was the head basketball coach at Alabama (1960–1968), and later was the head baseball coach of the Tide in the 1970s.

Following his retirement in 1987, Riley and his wife had lived in rural Kaleden, British Columbia, south of Penticton. After a lengthy illness, he died in a Penticton hospital at age 86 in 2012 on 4 August.
