= Mike Derks (Canadian football) =

Canadian gridiron football player (born 1962)

Profile
- Position: Tackle

Personal information
- Born: April 20, 1962 (age 64); Sudbury, Ontario, Canada
- Listed height: 6 ft 5 in (1.96 m)
- Listed weight: 280 lb (127 kg)

Career information
- University: University of Cincinnati

Career history
- 1985–90: Hamilton Tiger-Cats

Awards and highlights
- Grey Cup champion (1986)

Mike Derks (born April 20, 1962) is a former Canadian Football League (CFL) offensive lineman and Grey Cup champion. A native of Sudbury, Ontario, after playing for the Cincinnati Bearcats he joined the Hamilton Tiger-Cats for six seasons, winning the championship in 1986.
