= 1985 Ottawa Rough Riders season =

Canadian football team season

- Head coach: Joe Moss
- Home stadium: Lansdowne Park

Results
- Record: 7–9
- Division place: 3rd, East
- Playoffs: Lost in East Semi-Final

Uniform

The 1985 Ottawa Rough Riders finished the season in third place in the East Division with a 7–9 record. The team lost the East-Semi Final game to the Montreal Concordes.

== Offseason ==
=== CFL draft ===
Rd	Pick	Player	Position	School
1	1	Nicholas Benjamin	OL	Concordia
2	10	Tom Munroe	WR	British Columbia
3	19	Neri Fratin	RB	Ottawa
4	35	Marty Palazeti	DE	Marshall
6	46	Lance Chomyc	K/P	Toronto
7	55	George Ganas	RB	York
8	64	Morris Elfenbaum	OL	Minot State

=== Preseason ===
Date	Opponent	Final Score	Result	Attendance	Record
June 8	at Montreal Concordes	34–10	Loss	11,196	0–1
June 13	vs. Montreal Concordes	37–22	Loss	11,918	0–2
June 24	vs. Toronto Argonauts	23–22	Win	12,695	1–2
June 29	at Hamilton Tiger-Cats	33–14	Loss	16,753	1–3

== Regular season ==
=== Standings ===
East Division
Pos	Team	Pld	W	L	T	PF	PA	PD	Pts	Div	Stk
1	Hamilton Tiger-Cats (C, Q)	16	8	8	0	377	315	62	16	5–1	W3
2	Montreal Concordes (Q)	16	8	8	0	284	332	−48	16	2–4	W2
3	Ottawa Rough Riders (Q)	16	7	9	0	272	402	−130	14	4–2	L2
4	Toronto Argonauts	16	6	10	0	344	397	−53	12	1–5	W1

Source: "CFL.ca - Official Site of the Canadian Football League". Archived from the original on 2009-10-16.
(C) First round bye; (Q) Qualified for playoffs

=== Schedule ===
Week	Date	Opponent	Score	Result	Attendance	Record
1	July 7	at Saskatchewan Roughriders	46–22	Loss	20,785	0–1
2	Bye					
3	July 18	vs. Edmonton Eskimos	41–19	Win	20,425	1–1
4	July 28	vs. Calgary Stampeders	14–12	Win	20,153	2–1
5	Aug 2	at Edmonton Eskimos	49–14	Loss	41,493	2–2
6	Aug 8	at Winnipeg Blue Bombers	58–15	Loss	27,709	2–3
7	Aug 15	vs. Saskatchewan Roughriders	17–4	Win	20,348	3–3
8	Aug 22	at Toronto Argonauts	18–8	Win	29,637	4–3
9	Aug 30	vs. BC Lions	18–13	Loss	23,611	4–4
10	Sept 7	vs. Winnipeg Blue Bombers	42–14	Loss	19,165	4–5
11	Sept 14	at Calgary Stampeders	32–7	Loss	12,076	4–6
12	Sept 22	at Hamilton Tiger-Cats	32–11	Loss	16,101	4–7
13	Sept 29	vs. Montreal Concordes	23–7	Win	24,909	5–7
14	Oct 6	vs. Toronto Argonauts	19–15	Win	18,363	6–7
15	Bye					
16	Oct 19	at Montreal Concordes	30–7	Win	15,951	7–7
17	Oct 26	vs. Hamilton Tiger-Cats	34–4	Loss	23,692	7–8
18	Nov 1	at BC Lions	17–10	Loss	38,661	7–9

== Postseason ==
Round	Date	Opponent	Score	Result	Attendance
East Semi-Final	Nov 10	at Montreal Concordes	30–20	Loss	11,372

== Roster ==
1985 Ottawa Rough Riders final roster
Quarterbacks: 10 Troy Bodine; 3 Mike Hohensee; 6 J. C. Watts; Running backs: 21 Lester Brown; 24 Tim McCray; 32 Jim Reid; 26 Robert Reid; Wide receivers: 8 Waymon Alridge; 9 Mark Barousse; 27 Mike Caterbone; 15 Stew Fraser; 31 Brian Fryer; 18 Steve Hall; 14 Thad Jemison; Tight ends: 73 Mike Hudson	Offensive linemen: 68 Nick Benjamin G; 65 Roger Cattelan T; 57 Brad Fawcett T; 54 Ross Francis G; 53 Gerry Hornett T/G; 50 Kevin Powell T; 56 Bob Stephen C; 51 Pieter Vanden Bos G/C; 58 Scott Yeldon T; Defensive linemen: 83 Michel Bourgeau DT; 78 Ron Engleson DT; 63 Loyd Lewis DE; 66 Greg Marshall DE; 79 Jeff Roberts DE; 59 Mark Smythe DT	Linebackers: 34 Steve Harrison; 37 Shane Ireland; 75 Rick Sowieta; 42 Henry Taylor; 20 Tom Towns; 17 Al Washington; Defensive backs: 25 Ricky Barden; 22 Ralph Dixon; 38 Kevin Gray; 29 Jo Jo Heath; 39 Mike McIntyre; 33 Lamont Meacham; 38 Chris Sigler; Special teams: 13 Ken Clark P; 2 Dean Dorsey K; Italics indicate International player

== Awards and honours ==
=== CFL awards ===
- None

=== CFL All-Stars ===
- P – Ken Clark
