= 1985 Edmonton Eskimos season =

- General manager: Norm Kimball
- Head coach: Jackie Parker
- Home stadium: Commonwealth Stadium

Results
- Record: 10–6
- Division place: 3rd, West
- Playoffs: Lost West Semi-Final

The 1985 Edmonton Eskimos finished in third place in the West Division with a 10–6 record. The Eskimos offense had 447 points for, while the defense had 395 points allowed

== Regular season ==
=== Standings ===
West Division
Pos	Team	Pld	W	L	T	PF	PA	PD	Pts
1	BC Lions (C, Q)	16	13	3	0	481	297	+184	26
2	Winnipeg Blue Bombers (Q)	16	12	4	0	500	259	+241	24
3	Edmonton Eskimos (Q)	16	10	6	0	432	373	+59	20
4	Saskatchewan Roughriders	16	5	11	0	320	462	−142	10
5	Calgary Stampeders	16	3	13	0	256	429	−173	6

Source: "CFL.ca - Official Site of the Canadian Football League". Archived from the original on 2009-10-16.
(C) First round bye; (Q) Qualified for playoffs

=== Schedule ===
Week	Game	Date	Opponent	Results		Venue	Attendance
Week	Game	Date	Opponent	Score	Record	Venue	Attendance

==== Postseason ====
Round	Date	Opponent	Results		Venue	Attendance
Round	Date	Opponent	Score	Record	Venue	Attendance

=== Player stats ===
==== Passing ====
Player	Games Played	Attempts	Completions	Yards	Pct.	Interceptions	Long	Touchdowns
Matt Dunigan	14	405	242	3410	59.7	22	89	19
