= 1985 CFL season =

Canadian Football League season

- Duration: July 4 – November 3, 1985
- East champions: Hamilton Tiger-Cats
- West champions: BC Lions

73rd Grey Cup
- Date: November 24, 1985
- Venue: Olympic Stadium, Montreal
- Champions: BC Lions

CFL seasons
- ← 1984 1986 →

Canadian Football League team locations: West, East

The 1985 CFL season is considered to be the 32nd season in modern-day Canadian football, although it is officially the 28th Canadian Football League season.

== CFL news in 1985 ==
The CFL adopted a regular season overtime format that will consist of two-minute halves (no sudden death), which would be implemented for the 1986 season. In addition, the CFL changed the playoff overtime format from two ten-minute halves (with no sudden death) to two five-minute halves (no sudden death).

== Regular season standings ==
=== Final regular season standings ===
West Division
Pos	Team	Pld	W	L	T	PF	PA	PD	Pts
1	BC Lions (C, Q)	16	13	3	0	481	297	+184	26
2	Winnipeg Blue Bombers (Q)	16	12	4	0	500	259	+241	24
3	Edmonton Eskimos (Q)	16	10	6	0	432	373	+59	20
4	Saskatchewan Roughriders	16	5	11	0	320	462	−142	10
5	Calgary Stampeders	16	3	13	0	256	429	−173	6

Source: "CFL.ca - Official Site of the Canadian Football League". Archived from the original on October 16, 2009.
(C) First round bye; (Q) Qualified for playoffs

East Division
Pos	Team	Pld	W	L	T	PF	PA	PD	Pts	Div	Stk
1	Hamilton Tiger-Cats (C, Q)	16	8	8	0	377	315	62	16	5–1	W3
2	Montreal Concordes (Q)	16	8	8	0	284	332	−48	16	2–4	W2
3	Ottawa Rough Riders (Q)	16	7	9	0	272	402	−130	14	4–2	L2
4	Toronto Argonauts	16	6	10	0	344	397	−53	12	1–5	W1

Source: "CFL.ca - Official Site of the Canadian Football League". Archived from the original on October 16, 2009.
(C) First round bye; (Q) Qualified for playoffs

BC and Hamilton have first round byes.

== Grey Cup playoffs ==
The BC Lions are the 1985 Grey Cup champions, defeating the Hamilton Tiger-Cats 37–24, at Montreal's Olympic Stadium. This was BC's first Grey Cup victory since 1964. The Lions' Roy Dewalt (QB) was named the Grey Cup's Most Valuable Player on Offence and James "Quick" Parker (DE) was named Grey Cup's Most Valuable Player on Defence, while Lui Passaglia (K/P) was named the Grey Cup's Most Valuable Canadian.

=== Playoff bracket ===
November 10: Division Semifinals
East
E3	Ottawa Rough Riders	20
E2	Montreal Concordes	30
West
W3	Edmonton Eskimos	15
W2	Winnipeg Blue Bombers	22

November 17: Division Finals
E2	Montreal Concordes	26
E1	Hamilton Tiger-Cats	50
W2	Winnipeg Blue Bombers	22
W1	BC Lions	42

November 24: 73rd Grey Cup @ Olympic Stadium – Montreal, Quebec
E1	Hamilton Tiger-Cats	24
W1	BC Lions	37

== CFL leaders ==
- CFL passing leaders
- CFL rushing leaders
- CFL receiving leaders

== 1985 CFL All-Stars ==
=== Offence ===
- QB – Matt Dunigan, Edmonton Eskimos
- RB – Willard Reaves, Winnipeg Blue Bombers
- RB – Keyvan Jenkins, BC Lions
- SB – Joe Poplawski, Winnipeg Blue Bombers
- TE – Ray Elgaard, Saskatchewan Roughriders
- WR – Mervyn Fernandez, BC Lions
- WR – Jeff Boyd, Winnipeg Blue Bombers
- C – John Bonk, Winnipeg Blue Bombers
- OG – Dan Ferrone, Toronto Argonauts
- OG – Nick Bastaja, Winnipeg Blue Bombers
- OT – John Blain, BC Lions
- OT – Chris Walby, Winnipeg Blue Bombers

=== Defence ===
- DT – Mike Gray, BC Lions
- DT – James Curry, Toronto Argonauts
- DE – Grover Covington, Hamilton Tiger-Cats
- DE – James "Quick" Parker, BC Lions
- LB – Ben Zambiasi, Hamilton Tiger-Cats
- LB – Tyrone Jones, Winnipeg Blue Bombers
- LB – Kevin Konar, BC Lions
- DB – Darnell Clash, BC Lions
- DB – Less Browne, Hamilton Tiger-Cats
- DB – Ken Hailey, Winnipeg Blue Bombers
- DB – Howard Fields, Hamilton Tiger-Cats
- DB – Paul Bennett, Hamilton Tiger-Cats

=== Special teams ===
- P – Ken Clark, Ottawa Rough Riders
- K – Trevor Kennerd, Winnipeg Blue Bombers

== 1985 Eastern All-Stars ==
=== Offence ===
- QB – Ken Hobart, Hamilton Tiger-Cats
- RB – Bob Bronk, Toronto Argonauts
- RB – Lester Brown, Ottawa Rough Riders
- SB – Mike McTague, Montreal Concordes
- TE – Nick Arakgi, Montreal Concordes
- WR – Terry Greer, Toronto Argonauts
- WR – Steve Stapler, Hamilton Tiger-Cats
- C – Marv Allemang, Hamilton Tiger-Cats
- OG – Dan Ferrone, Toronto Argonauts
- OG – Lloyd Fairbanks, Montreal Concordes
- OT – Roger Cattelan, Ottawa Rough Riders
- OT – Kevin Powell, Ottawa Rough Riders

=== Defence ===
- DT – Doug Scott, Montreal Concordes
- DT – James Curry, Toronto Argonauts
- DE – Grover Covington, Hamilton Tiger-Cats
- DE – Lloyd Lewis, Ottawa Rough Riders
- LB – Ben Zambiasi, Hamilton Tiger-Cats
- LB – Rick Sowieta, Ottawa Rough Riders
- LB – William Mitchell, Toronto Argonauts
- DB – Carl Brazley, Toronto Argonauts
- DB – Less Browne, Hamilton Tiger-Cats
- DB – Ricky Barden, Ottawa Rough Riders
- DB – Howard Fields, Hamilton Tiger-Cats
- DB – Paul Bennett, Hamilton Tiger-Cats

=== Special teams ===
- P – Ken Clark, Ottawa Rough Riders
- K – Bernie Ruoff, Hamilton Tiger-Cats

== 1985 Western All-Stars ==
=== Offence ===
- QB – Matt Dunigan, Edmonton Eskimos
- RB – Willard Reaves, Winnipeg Blue Bombers
- RB – Keyvan Jenkins, BC Lions
- SB – Joe Poplawski, Winnipeg Blue Bombers
- TE – Ray Elgaard, Saskatchewan Roughriders
- WR – Mervyn Fernandez, BC Lions
- WR – Jeff Boyd, Winnipeg Blue Bombers
- C – John Bonk, Winnipeg Blue Bombers
- OG – Leo Blanchard, Edmonton Eskimos
- OG – Nick Bastaja, Winnipeg Blue Bombers
- OT – John Blain, BC Lions
- OT – Chris Walby, Winnipeg Blue Bombers

=== Defence ===
- DT – Mike Gray, BC Lions
- DT – Rick Klassen, BC Lions
- DE – Tony Norman, Winnipeg Blue Bombers
- DE – James "Quick" Parker, BC Lions
- LB – Dan Bass, Edmonton Eskimos
- LB – Tyrone Jones, Winnipeg Blue Bombers
- LB – Kevin Konar, BC Lions
- LB – Glen Jackson, BC Lions
- DB – Darnell Clash, BC Lions
- DB – Dave Shaw, Winnipeg Blue Bombers
- DB – Ken Hailey, Winnipeg Blue Bombers
- DB – Wylie Turner, Winnipeg Blue Bombers
- DB – Melvin Byrd, BC Lions
- DB – Scott Flagel, Winnipeg Blue Bombers

=== Special teams ===
- P – Tom Dixon, Edmonton Eskimos
- K – Trevor Kennerd, Winnipeg Blue Bombers

== 1985 CFL awards ==
- CFL's Most Outstanding Player Award – Mervyn Fernandez (WR), BC Lions
- CFL's Most Outstanding Canadian Award – Paul Bennett (DB), Hamilton Tiger-Cats
- CFL's Most Outstanding Defensive Player Award – Tyrone Jones (LB), Winnipeg Blue Bombers
- CFL's Most Outstanding Offensive Lineman Award – Nick Bastaja (OT), Winnipeg Blue Bombers
- CFL's Most Outstanding Rookie Award – Mike Gray (DT), BC Lions
- CFLPA's Outstanding Community Service Award – Tyrone Crews (LB), BC Lions
- CFL's Coach of the Year – Don Matthews, BC Lions
