= Norm Fieldgate Trophy =

The Norm Fieldgate Trophy is a Canadian Football League trophy awarded to the outstanding defensive player in the West Division. Each team in the West division nominates a player, from which the winner is chosen. Either the winner of this trophy or the winner of the James P. McCaffrey Trophy will also be the winner of the Canadian Football League Most Outstanding Defensive Player award. The trophy is named after former BC Lions linebacker Norm Fieldgate.

As part of the failed American expansion, the Fieldgate trophy was awarded in 1995 to the North Division's outstanding defensive player.

Prior to 1974 the CFL's Most Outstanding Lineman Award was awarded to both outstanding defensive players and outstanding linemen in the West Division.

== Norm Fieldgate Trophy winners ==
- 1974 – John Helton (DT), Calgary Stampeders
- 1975 – Bill Baker (DE), BC Lions
- 1976 – Bill Baker (DE), BC Lions
- 1977 – Danny Kepley (LB), Edmonton Eskimos
- 1978 – Dave Fennell, (DT), Edmonton Eskimos
- 1979 – John Helton (DT), Winnipeg Blue Bombers
- 1980 – Danny Kepley (LB), Edmonton Eskimos
- 1981 – Danny Kepley (LB), Edmonton Eskimos
- 1982 – James "Quick" Parker (LB), Edmonton Eskimos
- 1983 – Danny Bass (LB), Calgary Stampeders
- 1984 – James "Quick" Parker (DE), BC Lions
- 1985 – Tyrone Jones (LB), Winnipeg Blue Bombers
- 1986 – James "Quick" Parker (DE), BC Lions
- 1987 – Greg Stumon (DE), BC Lions
- 1988 – Danny Bass (LB), Edmonton Eskimos
- 1989 – Danny Bass (LB), Edmonton Eskimos
- 1990 – Stewart Hill (DE), Edmonton Eskimos
- 1991 – Will Johnson (DE), Calgary Stampeders
- 1992 – Willie Pless (LB), Edmonton Eskimos
- 1993 – Jearld Baylis (DT), Saskatchewan Roughriders
- 1994 – Willie Pless (LB), Edmonton Eskimos
- 1995 – Willie Pless (LB), Edmonton Eskimos
- 1996 – Willie Pless (LB), Edmonton Eskimos
- 1997 – Willie Pless (LB), Edmonton Eskimos
- 1998 – Alondra Johnson (LB), Calgary Stampeders
- 1999 – Daved Benefield (DE), BC Lions
- 2000 – Terry Ray (LB), Edmonton Eskimos
- 2001 – Barrin Simpson (LB), BC Lions
- 2002 – Elfrid Payton (DE), Edmonton Eskimos
- 2003 – Joe Fleming (DT), Calgary Stampeders
- 2004 – John Grace (LB), Calgary Stampeders
- 2005 – John Grace (LB), Calgary Stampeders
- 2006 – Brent Johnson (DE), BC Lions
- 2007 – Cameron Wake (DE), BC Lions
- 2008 – Cameron Wake (DE), BC Lions
- 2009 – John Chick (DT), Saskatchewan Roughriders
- 2010 – Juwan Simpson (LB), Calgary Stampeders
- 2011 – Jerrell Freeman (LB), Saskatchewan Roughriders
- 2012 – J. C. Sherritt (LB), Edmonton Eskimos
- 2013 – Charleston Hughes (LB), Calgary Stampeders
- 2014 – Solomon Elimimian (LB), BC Lions
- 2015 – Adam Bighill (LB), BC Lions
- 2016 – Solomon Elimimian (LB), BC Lions
- 2017 – Alex Singleton (LB), Calgary Stampeders
- 2018 – Adam Bighill (LB), Winnipeg Blue Bombers
- 2019 – Willie Jefferson (DE), Winnipeg Blue Bombers
- 2020 – Season cancelled due to COVID-19
- 2021 – Adam Bighill (LB), Winnipeg Blue Bombers
- 2022 – Shawn Lemon (DE), Calgary Stampeders
- 2023 – Mathieu Betts (DE), BC Lions
- 2024 – Rolan Milligan (DB), Saskatchewan Roughriders
- 2025 – Mathieu Betts (DE), BC Lions

== CFL's Most Outstanding Lineman Award in the West Division prior to the 1974 ==
- 1957 – Art Walker (OT/DG), Edmonton Eskimos
- 1958 – Don Luzzi (DT), Calgary Stampeders
- 1959 – Roger Nelson (OT), Edmonton Eskimos
- 1960 – Herb Gray (DE), Winnipeg Blue Bombers
- 1961 – Frank Rigney (OT), Winnipeg Blue Bombers
- 1962 – Wayne Harris (LB), Calgary Stampeders
- 1963 – Tom Brown (LB), British Columbia Lions
- 1964 – Tom Brown (LB), British Columbia Lions
- 1965 – Wayne Harris (LB), Calgary Stampeders
- 1966 – Wayne Harris (LB), Calgary Stampeders
- 1967 – Ed McQuarters (DT), Saskatchewan Roughriders
- 1968 – Ted Urness (C), Saskatchewan Roughriders
- 1969 – John LaGrone (DT), Edmonton Eskimos
- 1970 – Wayne Harris (LB), Calgary Stampeders
- 1971 – Wayne Harris (LB), Calgary Stampeders
- 1972 – John Helton (DT), Calgary Stampeders
- 1973 – Ray Nettles (LB), British Columbia Lions
