= Jackie Parker Trophy =

The Jackie Parker Trophy is a Canadian Football League trophy that is awarded annually to the Most Outstanding Rookie in the West Division, since 1974. Each team in the West Division nominates a candidate from which a winner is chosen, and either this winner or the winner of the Frank M. Gibson Trophy will receive the Canadian Football League Most Outstanding Rookie Award. The award is named after former CFL star player and coach Jackie Parker.

Before 1974, the Dr. Beattie Martin Trophy was originally awarded to the West's Most Outstanding Rookie before being repurposed. In 1995, as part of the failed American expansion, the Parker trophy was given to the most outstanding rookie in the North Division.

== Jackie Parker Trophy winners ==
- 2025 – Trey Vaval (DB), Winnipeg Blue Bombers
- 2024 – Nick Anderson (LB), Edmonton Elks
- 2023 – Kai Gray (DB), Edmonton Elks
- 2022 – Dalton Schoen (WR), Winnipeg Blue Bombers
- 2021 – Jordan Williams (LB), BC Lions
- 2020 – Season cancelled due to COVID-19
- 2019 – Nate Holley (LB), Calgary Stampeders
- 2018 – Jordan Williams-Lambert (WR), Saskatchewan Roughriders
- 2017 – Marken Michel (WR), Calgary Stampeders
- 2016 – DaVaris Daniels (WR), Calgary Stampeders
- 2015 – Derel Walker (WR), Edmonton Eskimos
- 2014 – Dexter McCoil (LB), Edmonton Eskimos
- 2013 – Brett Jones (OL), Calgary Stampeders
- 2012 – Jabar Westerman (LB), BC Lions
- 2011 – J. C. Sherritt (LB), Edmonton Eskimos
- 2010 – Solomon Elimimian (LB), BC Lions
- 2009 – Martell Mallett (RB), BC Lions
- 2008 – Weston Dressler (SB), Saskatchewan Roughriders
- 2007 – Cameron Wake (DE), BC Lions
- 2006 – Aaron Hunt (DT), BC Lions
- 2005 – Gavin Walls (DE), Winnipeg Blue Bombers
- 2004 – Nikolas Lewis (WR), Calgary Stampeders
- 2003 – Frank Cutolo (WR), BC Lions
- 2002 – Jason Clermont (SB), BC Lions
- 2001 – Barrin Simpson (LB), BC Lions
- 2000 – George White (LB), Saskatchewan Roughriders
- 1999 – Paul Lacoste (LB), BC Lions
- 1998 – Steve Muhammad (DB), BC Lions
- 1997 – B.J. Gallis (LB), BC Lions
- 1996 – Kelvin Anderson (RB), Calgary Stampeders
- 1995 – Shalon Baker (WR), Edmonton Eskimos
- 1994 – Carlos Huerta (K/P), Las Vegas Posse
- 1993 – Brian Wiggins (WR), Calgary Stampeders
- 1992 – Bruce Covernton (OT), Calgary Stampeders
- 1991 – Jon Volpe (RB), BC Lions
- 1990 – Lucius Floyd (RB), Saskatchewan Roughriders
- 1989 – Darrell Wallace (RB), BC Lions
- 1988 – Jeff Fairholm (SB), Saskatchewan Roughriders
- 1987 – Stanley Blair (CB), Edmonton Eskimos
- 1986 – Harold Hallman (DT), Calgary Stampeders
- 1985 – Michael Gray (DT), BC Lions
- 1984 – Stewart Hill (LB), Edmonton Eskimos
- 1983 – Willard Reaves (RB), Winnipeg Blue Bombers
- 1982 – Mervyn Fernandez (WR), BC Lions
- 1981 – Vince Goldsmith (LB), Saskatchewan Roughriders
- 1980 – William Miller (RB), Winnipeg Blue Bombers
- 1979 – Brian Kelly (WR), Edmonton Eskimos
- 1978 – Joe Poplawski (WR), Winnipeg Blue Bombers
- 1977 – Leon Bright (WR), BC Lions
- 1976 – John Sciarra (QB), BC Lions
- 1975 – Larry Cameron (LB), BC Lions
- 1974 – Tom Scott (WR), Winnipeg Blue Bombers

== Outstanding Rookie in the West Division prior to the trophy ==
- 1973 – Lorne Richardson (DB), Saskatchewan Roughriders
- 1972 – Tom Campana (RB), Saskatchewan Roughriders

See Dr. Beattie Martin Trophy to view other recipients of an award given to the most outstanding rookie in the West Division.
