= 1984 CFL season =

Canadian Football League season

- Duration: June 29 – October 28, 1984
- East champions: Hamilton Tiger-Cats
- West champions: Winnipeg Blue Bombers

72nd Grey Cup
- Date: November 18, 1984
- Venue: Commonwealth Stadium, Edmonton
- Champions: Winnipeg Blue Bombers

CFL seasons
- ← 1983 1985 →

Canadian Football League team locations: West, East

The 1984 CFL season is considered to be the 31st season in modern-day Canadian football, although it is officially the 27th Canadian Football League season.

== CFL news in 1984 ==
The CFL granted a conditional expansion team to the city of Halifax, the team was named the Atlantic Schooners. The franchise were supposed to begin play in 1984. However, before the season started, ownership could not secure and provide the financing for a new stadium. Without a stadium in place, the Schooners folded without playing a single game in the CFL.

Calgary native Douglas H. Mitchell, Q.C. became the sixth CFL Commissioner in history on Friday, June 1, succeeding Jake Gaudaur who had served in that position since 1968.

In the fall, the CFL conducted a market research study with the fans in CFL cities.

The CFL, eliminated territorial exemptions, which allowed the 1985 Canadian College Draft to be more open – allowing teams to draft players from different regions.

The regular season started in June for the first time in league history, while Edmonton hosted its first Grey Cup championship game.

== Regular season standings ==
=== Final regular season standings ===
West Division
Pos	Team	Pld	W	L	T	PF	PA	PD	Pts
1	BC Lions (C, Q)	16	12	3	1	445	281	+164	25
2	Winnipeg Blue Bombers (Q)	16	11	4	1	523	309	+214	23
3	Edmonton Eskimos (Q)	16	9	7	0	464	443	+21	18
4	Saskatchewan Roughriders	16	6	9	1	348	479	−131	13
5	Calgary Stampeders	16	6	10	0	314	425	−111	12

Source: "CFL.ca - Official Site of the Canadian Football League". Archived from the original on October 20, 2009.
(C) First round bye; (Q) Qualified for playoffs

East Division
Pos	Team	Pld	W	L	T	PF	PA	PD	Pts	Div	Stk
1	Toronto Argonauts (C, Q)	16	9	6	1	461	361	100	19	5–1	L1
2	Hamilton Tiger-Cats (Q)	16	6	9	1	353	439	−86	13	4–2	W3
3	Montreal Concordes (Q)	16	6	9	1	386	404	−18	13	1–5	W1
4	Ottawa Rough Riders	16	4	12	0	354	507	−153	8	2–4	L1

Source: "CFL.ca - Official Site of the Canadian Football League". Archived from the original on October 20, 2009.
(C) First round bye; (Q) Qualified for playoffs

BC and Toronto have first round byes.

== Grey Cup playoffs ==
The Winnipeg Blue Bombers are the 1984 Grey Cup champions, defeating the Hamilton Tiger-Cats 47–17, at Edmonton's Commonwealth Stadium. This was Winnipeg's first Grey Cup victory since 1962. The Blue Bombers' Tom Clements (QB) was named the Grey Cup's Most Valuable Player on Offence and Tyrone Jones (LB) was named Grey Cup's Most Valuable Player on Defence, while Sean Kehoe (RB) was named the Grey Cup's Most Valuable Canadian.

=== Playoff bracket ===
November 4: Division Semifinals
East
E3	Montreal Concordes	11
E2	Hamilton Tiger-Cats	17
West
W3	Edmonton Eskimos	20
W2	Winnipeg Blue Bombers	55

November 11: Division Finals
E2	Hamilton Tiger-Cats	14*
E1	Toronto Argonauts	13
W2	Winnipeg Blue Bombers	31
W1	BC Lions	14

November 18: 72nd Grey Cup @ Commonwealth Stadium – Edmonton, AB
E2	Hamilton Tiger-Cats	17
W2	Winnipeg Blue Bombers	47

*-Team won in Overtime.

== CFL leaders ==
- CFL passing leaders
- CFL rushing leaders
- CFL receiving leaders

== 1984 CFL All-Stars ==
=== Offence ===
- QB – Tom Clements, Winnipeg Blue Bombers
- RB – Willard Reaves, Winnipeg Blue Bombers
- RB – Dwaine Wilson, Montreal Concordes
- TE – Nick Arakgi, Montreal Concordes
- SB – Joe Poplawski, Winnipeg Blue Bombers
- WR – Brian Kelly, Edmonton Eskimos
- WR – Mervyn Fernandez, BC Lions
- C – John Bonk, Winnipeg Blue Bombers
- OG – Nick Bastaja, Winnipeg Blue Bombers
- OG – Dan Ferrone, Toronto Argonauts
- OT – Chris Walby, Winnipeg Blue Bombers
- OT – John Blain, BC Lions

=== Defence ===
- DT – James Curry, Toronto Argonauts
- DT – Mack Moore, BC Lions
- DE – Steve Raquet, Montreal Concordes
- DE – James "Quick" Parker, BC Lions
- LB – Aaron Brown, Winnipeg Blue Bombers
- LB – Tyrone Jones, Winnipeg Blue Bombers
- LB – Stewart Hill, Edmonton Eskimos
- DB – David Shaw, Winnipeg Blue Bombers
- DB – Harry Skipper, Montreal Concordes
- DB – Ken Hailey, Winnipeg Blue Bombers
- DB – Larry Crawford, BC Lions
- DB – Laurent DesLauriers, Edmonton Eskimos

=== Special teams ===
- P – Bernie Ruoff, Hamilton Tiger-Cats
- K – Lui Passaglia, BC Lions

== 1984 Eastern All-Stars ==
=== Offence ===
- QB – Joe Barnes, Toronto Argonauts
- RB – Lester Brown, Toronto Argonauts
- RB – Dwaine Wilson, Montreal Concordes
- TE – Nick Arakgi, Montreal Concordes
- SB – Paul Pearson, Toronto Argonauts
- WR – Terry Greer, Toronto Argonauts
- WR – Ron Johnson, Hamilton Tiger-Cats
- C – Henry Waszczuk, Hamilton Tiger-Cats
- OG – Lloyd Fairbanks, Montreal Concordes
- OG – Dan Ferrone, Toronto Argonauts
- OT – Miles Gorrell, Montreal Concordes
- OT – John Malinosky, Toronto Argonauts

=== Defence ===
- DT – James Curry, Toronto Argonauts
- DT – Doug Scott, Montreal Concordes
- DE – Steve Raquet, Montreal Concordes
- DE – Greg Marshall, Ottawa Rough Riders
- LB – William Mitchell, Toronto Argonauts
- LB – Al Washington, Ottawa Rough Riders
- LB – Ben Zambiasi, Hamilton Tiger-Cats
- DB – Carl Brazley, Toronto Argonauts
- DB – Harry Skipper, Montreal Concordes
- DB – Felix Wright, Hamilton Tiger-Cats
- DB – Ricky Barden, Ottawa Rough Riders
- DB – Phil Jones, Montreal Concordes

=== Special teams ===
- P – Bernie Ruoff, Hamilton Tiger-Cats
- K – Bernie Ruoff, Hamilton Tiger-Cats

== 1984 Western All-Stars ==
=== Offence ===
- QB – Tom Clements, Winnipeg Blue Bombers
- RB – Willard Reaves, Winnipeg Blue Bombers
- RB – Craig Ellis, Saskatchewan Roughriders
- SB – Chris DeFrance, Saskatchewan Roughriders
- SB – Joe Poplawski, Winnipeg Blue Bombers
- WR – Brian Kelly, Edmonton Eskimos
- WR – Mervyn Fernandez, BC Lions
- C – John Bonk, Winnipeg Blue Bombers
- OG – Nick Bastaja, Winnipeg Blue Bombers
- OG – Leo Blanchard, Edmonton Eskimos
- OT – Chris Walby, Winnipeg Blue Bombers
- OT – John Blain, BC Lions

=== Defence ===
- DT – Randy Trautman, Calgary Stampeders
- DT – Mack Moore, BC Lions
- DE – Tony Norman, Winnipeg Blue Bombers
- DE – James "Quick" Parker, BC Lions
- LB – Aaron Brown, Winnipeg Blue Bombers
- LB – Tyrone Jones, Winnipeg Blue Bombers
- LB – Stewart Hill, Edmonton Eskimos
- DB – David Shaw, Winnipeg Blue Bombers
- DB – Terry Irvin, Saskatchewan Roughriders
- DB – Ken Hailey, Winnipeg Blue Bombers
- DB – Larry Crawford, BC Lions
- DB – Laurent DesLauriers, Edmonton Eskimos

=== Special teams ===
- P – Bob Cameron, Winnipeg Blue Bombers
- K – Lui Passaglia, BC Lions

== 1984 CFL awards ==
- CFL's Most Outstanding Player Award – Willard Reaves (RB), Winnipeg Blue Bombers
- CFL's Most Outstanding Canadian Award – Nick Arakgi (SB), Montreal Concordes
- CFL's Most Outstanding Defensive Player Award – James "Quick" Parker (DE), BC Lions
- CFL's Most Outstanding Offensive Lineman Award – John Bonk (C), Winnipeg Blue Bombers
- CFL's Most Outstanding Rookie Award – Dwaine Wilson (RB), Montreal Concordes
- CFLPA's Outstanding Community Service Award – Bruce Walker (WR), Ottawa Rough Riders
- CFL's Coach of the Year – Cal Murphy, Winnipeg Blue Bombers
