= Chris Walby =

Canadian gridiron football player (born 1956)

No. 63
- Position: Offensive tackle

Personal information
- Born: October 23, 1956 (age 70); Winnipeg, Manitoba, Canada
- Listed height: 6 ft 7 in (2.01 m)
- Listed weight: 325 lb (147 kg)

Career information
- College: Dickinson State
- CFL draft: 1981: 1st round, 4th overall pick

Career history
- 1981: Montreal Alouettes
- 1981–1996: Winnipeg Blue Bombers

Awards and highlights
- 3× Grey Cup champion (1984, 1988, 1990); 2× Most Outstanding Offensive Lineman (1987, 1993); 4× Leo Dandurand Trophy (1987, 1990, 1991, 1993); 9× CFL All-Star (1984–1987, 1989, 1990, 1991, 1993, 1994); 7× CFL East All-Star (1987, 1989–1994); 4× CFL West All-Star (1984, 1985, 1986, 1996)
- Canadian Football Hall of Fame (Class of 2003)

Chris Walby (born October 23, 1956) is a retired Canadian Football League player who played the offensive tackle position almost exclusively with the Winnipeg Blue Bombers. He won three Grey Cups with the Bombers in 1984, 1988, and 1990. Walby was also a sportscaster with the Canadian Broadcasting Corporation's CFL on CBC telecasts following his retirement.

== Early life and college career ==
Born in Winnipeg, Manitoba, Walby grew up in the city's North End on Polson Avenue. He attended school at St. John's High School where he started playing junior football for the first time in grade 12. Growing up in Winnipeg, the primary sport was hockey and Walby played for the West Kildonan/Kildonan North Stars.

He played in the 1975–76 and 76-77 seasons, scoring four goals and nine assists but racking up 275 penalty minutes. Playing hockey in an era of fighting, he got into a pre-game altercation with Harvey Takvam. Walby and teammate Jimmy Flett were arrested. Walby was charged with assault causing bodily harm and given a two-year conditional sentence. After his junior hockey career, he started playing football with the Winnipeg Rods, and earned an athletic scholarship to play college football at Dickinson State University in North Dakota.

== Professional football career ==
Following his collegiate career, Walby was drafted in the first round of the 1981 CFL Draft by the Montreal Alouettes. Walby played five games on the offensive line for them during the 1981 CFL season. Wrangling by management over his salary left Walby without a contract and short pay after he was waived by Montreal general manager Bob Geary; this left him with a bad taste in his mouth, but also with a contract offer from his hometown Winnipeg Blue Bombers. Bombers' assistant general manager Paul Robson greeted Walby at the airport, and within 30 minutes of his arrival had signed him to the team.

Assistant coach Ellis Rainsberger moved Walby from defensive end to right guard in 1982 and 1983. The following season he moved to right tackle, where his success took him to a Hall of Fame career on the offensive line. Robson later said of his playing style "He was an offensive lineman with a defensive lineman's personality, and that was the best of both worlds."

For the remaining 16 years of his professional football career (1981–1996), Walby was a fixture on the Bombers' offensive line and a favourite of fans. He was named a CFL All-Star nine times, received the CFL's Most Outstanding Offensive Lineman Award twice, and won the Grey Cup on three occasions. He is often referred to as one of the greatest offensive linemen in the history of the CFL.

== Post-football career ==
After his football career, Walby ran for a seat in the Manitoba Legislature for the Liberal Party of Manitoba but lost. He also was involved in various business ventures such as a restaurant called Hog City Bar and Grill.

Walby was a sportscaster on the CBC's CFL on CBC television broadcasts.

== Awards and honours ==
In 2003, Walby was elected into the Canadian Football Hall of Fame and in 2005, was chosen as one of the Blue Bombers All-Time 20 Greatest players. In November 2006, Walby was chosen 22nd amongst the CFL's 50 Greatest Players in a TSN poll. Inducted into the Manitoba Sports Hall of Fame and Museum in 2006.
