= John Chick =

American football player (born 1982)

No. 97
- Position: Defensive end

Personal information
- Born: November 20, 1982 (age 43); Gillette, Wyoming, U.S.
- Listed height: 6 ft 4 in (1.93 m)
- Listed weight: 250 lb (113 kg)

Career information
- High school: Campbell County (Gillette)
- College: Utah State

Career history
- 2006: Houston Texans*
- 2007–2009: Saskatchewan Roughriders
- 2010–2011: Indianapolis Colts*
- 2011–2012: Jacksonville Jaguars
- 2013–2015: Saskatchewan Roughriders
- 2016–2017: Hamilton Tiger-Cats
- 2017: Edmonton Eskimos
- * Offseason or practice squad member only

Awards and highlights
- 2× Grey Cup champion (2007, 2013); Norm Fieldgate Trophy (2009); CFL's Most Outstanding Defensive Player Award (2009); 3× CFL All-Star (2009, 2014, 2016); CFL East All-Star (2016); 2× CFL West All-Star (2009, 2014)

Career CFL statistics
- Games played: 128
- Total tackles: 219
- Sacks: 69.5
- Forced fumbles: 15
- Stats at Pro Football Reference
- Stats at CFL.ca

John Chick (born November 20, 1982) is an American former professional football player who was a defensive end for eight seasons in the Canadian Football League (CFL), primarily with the Saskatchewan Roughriders. After signing with Saskatchewan in 2007, he was named the CFL's Most Outstanding Defensive Player after the 2009 CFL season. He would help the team capture the Grey Cup twice, in 2007 and 2013. Chick has also spent time in the National Football League (NFL) with the Indianapolis Colts and Jacksonville Jaguars. Prior to playing professional football, Chick played college football for the Utah State Aggies. During his senior season with the Aggies, Chick recorded 12.5 quarterback sacks, good enough for fifth overall in the National Collegiate Athletic Association. Chick also played for the Hamilton Tiger Cats and Edmonton Eskimos later in his career.

== Professional career ==
=== Houston Texans ===
Chick attended training camp with the Houston Texans of the National Football League (NFL) as an undrafted free agent in 2006.

=== Saskatchewan Roughriders ===
Chick joined the Saskatchewan Roughriders of the Canadian Football League (CFL) in December 2006. During his rookie season, he started 13 games and was the club's nominee for CFL's Most Outstanding Rookie Award, and also helped the team win the 2007 Grey Cup. In the Grey Cup final game, Chick recorded three tackles, one quarterback sack and forced one fumble. After the 2009 CFL season, Chick was named the league's top defensive player.

=== Indianapolis Colts ===
Chick signed with the Indianapolis Colts (NFL). He spent the entire 2010 NFL season on the team's practice roster.

=== Jacksonville Jaguars ===
Chick joined the Jacksonville Jaguars (NFL) for the 2011 NFL season. During his first season with the Jaguars, Chick played in 11 games with the team. He was on the Jaguars roster for the 2012 season, spending six games on the physically unable to perform list before being promoted to the active roster. He ended up playing eight games for the Jaguars in 2012.

=== Saskatchewan Roughriders (II) ===
Chick re-signed with the Saskatchewan Roughriders (CFL) on June 2, 2013. Chick proved he was still a pass rushing talent: In 2013, he made 36 tackles and 8 sacks, while in 2014, he led the CFL in sacks with 15, while adding 35 tackles. Chick, along with Ricky Foley, Tearrius George and Keith Shologan, led the league in sacks in 2013, en route to helping the Roughriders win the 101st Grey Cup. In February 2015, Chick and the Riders agreed to a contract extension that through the 2016 season. However, he was released by the club on January 14, 2016.

=== Hamilton Tiger-Cats ===
On January 24, 2016, it was reported that Chick had signed with the Hamilton Tiger-Cats (CFL), reuniting him with his first CFL coach, Kent Austin. In his first season in Hamilton, Chick played in all 18 regular season games, tied his single-season tackle record of 40, and amassed 14 quarterback sacks (one shy of his career high). He was named a CFL All-Star for the third time in his career. On May 15, 2017, the Ti-Cats announced a contract extension for Chick, keeping him in Hamilton through the 2018 season.

=== Edmonton Eskimos ===
On August 20, 2017, the Tiger-Cats traded Chick to the Edmonton Eskimos. In the deal, the Eskimos also received a fifth-round pick in the 2018 draft; the Tiger-Cats received a second-round pick in the 2018 draft. After having played briefly with the Eskimos organization, he announced his retirement from professional football on March 30, 2018.

== Personal life ==
Chick was diagnosed with Type 1 diabetes when he was 14 years old. He wears an insulin pump at all times. He does charity work with several diabetes-related associations.

Chick currently works as Director of Prison Ministry for the Catholic Diocese of St. Augustine in Northeast Florida.
