= Chris DeFrance =

American football player (born 1956)

No. 81
- Position: Wide receiver

Personal information
- Born: September 13, 1956 (age 70); Waldo, Arkansas, U.S.
- Listed height: 6 ft 1 in (1.85 m)
- Listed weight: 205 lb (93 kg)

Career information
- High school: Corcoran (CA)
- College: Arizona State
- NFL draft: 1979: 6th round, 164th overall pick

Career history
- Dallas Cowboys (1979)*; Washington Redskins (1979); Chicago Bears (1980)*; Saskatchewan Roughriders (1981–1985); Montreal Alouettes (1986)*
- * Offseason or practice squad member only

Awards and highlights
- Second-team All-Pac-10 (1978); 2× CFL West All-Star (1983, 1984)

Career NFL statistics
- Games played: 4
- Stats at Pro Football Reference

Chris Anthony DeFrance (born September 13, 1956) is an American former professional football player who was a wide receiver in the National Football League (NFL) for the Washington Redskins. He also was a member of the Saskatchewan Roughriders of the Canadian Football League (CFL). He played college football for the Arizona State Sun Devils.

== Early life ==
DeFrance attended Corcoran High School. He moved on to Bakersfield College, where he was a Junior College All-American at wide receiver and helped his team reach the 1976 Junior Rose Bowl. In track, he practiced the long jump and triple jump, winning the conference championship in both events. He also ran the mile-relay.

In 1977, he transferred to Arizona State University, posting 11 receptions for 291 yards and 3 touchdowns. In the Fiesta Bowl against Penn State University, he came up big with 7 receptions for 144 yards.

In 1978, although he missed spring practice with a broken foot, he came back to lead the team with 31 receptions for 617 yards and 5 touchdowns. In the Garden State Bowl, he had a 58-yard touchdown reception.

== Professional career ==
=== Dallas Cowboys ===
DeFrance was selected by the Dallas Cowboys in the sixth round (164th overall) of the 1979 NFL draft. He was waived on August 21.

=== Washington Redskins ===
On August 29, 1979, he was claimed off waivers by the Washington Redskins. He was cut on October 9.

=== Chicago Bears ===
On February 6, 1980, he was signed as a free agent by the Chicago Bears. He was released on August 19.

=== Saskatchewan Roughriders ===
On March 19, 1981, he was signed by the Saskatchewan Roughriders of the Canadian Football League. In his first year he posted 64 receptions for 1,195 yards, an 18.7-yard average and 5 touchdowns, including a 100-yard touchdown reception. He had 3 straight 1,000+ receiving yards seasons and was a two-time CFL West All-Star. In 1984, he missed the 1,000 yards plateau (917 yards) because of injuries.

In 1986, he was traded to the Montreal Alouettes in exchange for linebacker John Pointer. He was cut during training camp.

DeFrance finished his career with 328 receptions for 5,035 yards and 21 touchdowns.
