= Willard Reaves =

American football player (born 1959)

Leader of the Manitoba Liberal Party
- Incumbent
- Assumed office September 29, 2025
- Deputy: Cindy Lamoureux and Jasbir Singh
- Preceded by: Cindy Lamoureux

Deputy Leader of the Manitoba Liberal Party
- In office November 28, 2023 – June 26, 2024
- Leader: Cindy Lamoureux (interim)
- Succeeded by: Cindy Lamoureux

Personal details
- Born: Willard Sheldon Reaves; August 17, 1959 (age 67) Flagstaff, Arizona, U.S.
- Party: Liberal
- Occupation: Politician, football player
- Football career

No. 38
- Position: Running back

Personal information
- Listed height: 5 ft 11 in (1.80 m)
- Listed weight: 200 lb (91 kg)

Career information
- High school: Flagstaff (AZ) Coconino
- College: Northern Arizona

Career history
- 1981: Green Bay Packers
- 1983: Edmonton Eskimos*
- 1983–1987: Winnipeg Blue Bombers
- 1988–1989: Washington Redskins
- 1989: Miami Dolphins
- * Offseason or practice squad member only

Awards and highlights
- Grey Cup champion (1984); CFL's Most Outstanding Player Award (1984); Jeff Nicklin Memorial Trophy (1984); 3× Eddie James Memorial Trophy (1983–1985); Jackie Parker Trophy (1983); 4× CFL All-Star (1983, 1984, 1985, 1987)
- Stats at Pro Football Reference

Willard Sheldon Reaves (born August 17, 1959) is an American-Canadian politician and former professional gridiron football running back who has served as the leader of the Manitoba Liberal Party since 2025. He previously served as the party's deputy leader from 2023 to 2024, and unsuccessfully ran to represent Fort Whyte in the Legislative Assembly of Manitoba in 2022 and 2023, losing both times to fellow ex-Blue Bomber Obby Khan of the Progressive Conservative Party of Manitoba.

Reaves played for the Winnipeg Blue Bombers in Canadian Football League (CFL), as well as for the Miami Dolphins and the Washington Redskins in the National Football League (NFL).

== College career ==
Reaves played college football at Northern Arizona University from 1977 to 1980. He rushed for 2,139 yards at university, the best being 1979 when he rushed for 1,084 yards and was voted First-team All Big Sky Conference First-team All American.

In 1992, Reaves was inducted into the Northern Arizona University Athletics Hall of Fame, and in 2002 he became a member of the Manitoba Sports Hall of Fame and Museum.

== Professional career ==
=== Canadian Football League ===
Reaves played five seasons for the Blue Bombers from 1983 to 1987. He rushed for 898 yards in his first year and was runner up for the CFL's Most Outstanding Rookie Award and an all star. In 1984, he led the league rushing for 1,733 yards on 304 carries and 18 touchdowns, all team records. He also set a CFL record with 2,140 yards from scrimmage. He won the CFL's Most Outstanding Player Award. He also helped his team win the 72nd Grey Cup, their first victory since 1962.

Reaves rushed for 1,000 yards two other times (1,323 in 1985 and 1,471 in 1987), he led the league in both seasons. He finished his career with 5,923 total rushing yards for the Blue Bombers. He led the CFL in rushing 3 times in his career. He was a three time CFL all star.

=== National Football League ===
In 1988, he got into a contract dispute with the Bombers, who wanted Reaves to take a massive paycut. He was released and tried out with the NFL (he was originally undrafted) and in 1989 he played two games with the Miami Dolphins and one game with the Washington Redskins.

== Career regular season rushing statistics ==
CFL statistics			Rushing				
Year	Team	GP	Rush	Yards	Y/R	Lg	TD
1983	Winnipeg Blue Bombers	9	164	898	5.5	75	9
1984	Winnipeg Blue Bombers	16	304	1733	5.7	68	14
1985	Winnipeg Blue Bombers	16	267	1323	5.0	68	9
1986	Winnipeg Blue Bombers	6	104	498	4.8	27	3
1987	Winnipeg Blue Bombers	15	271	1471	5.4	69	9
1989	Washington Redskins	2	1	−1	−1.0	−1	0
1989	Miami Dolphins	1	-	-	-	-	-
	CFL totals	62	1110	5923	5.3	75	44

== Political career ==
In October 2021, Reaves was announced as the Manitoba Liberal Party's candidate in the 2022 Fort Whyte by-election to the Legislative Assembly of Manitoba. Reaves ultimately lost to Progressive Conservative candidate and fellow former Blue Bomber, Obby Khan. Reaves was defeated by Khan in a rematch in the 2023 Manitoba general election.

On November 28, 2023, Reaves was named deputy leader of the Manitoba Liberal Party. He stepped down from that position a few months later on June 26, 2024.

On September 7, 2025, he announced his run for leader of the Manitoba Liberals, being endorsed by former MLP leader Jon Gerrard. He was acclaimed as leader on September 29, 2025.

== Personal life ==
Following his retirement from the NFL, Reaves moved back to Winnipeg and became a sergeant with the Manitoba Sheriff Service. Willard's eldest son, Ryan Reaves, is a former professional ice hockey right wing for the San Jose Sharks of the National Hockey League. Willard's youngest son, Jordan Reaves, is a professional football player with the Edmonton Elks of the CFL. He also has two daughters, Regina and Renee.

Reaves is the great-great-grandson of Bass Reeves, a former slave who was the first black lawman west of the Mississippi River and among the first black U.S. deputy marshalls; Reeves' life is the focus of the 2023 TV series Lawmen: Bass Reeves. Bass served as a deputy U.S. marshal in Fort Smith, Arkansas, under the direction of judge Isaac C. Parker, known as the "Hanging Judge".

== Electoral record ==
2023 Manitoba general election: Fort Whyte
Party	Candidate	Votes	%	±%	Expenditures
Progressive Conservative	Obby Khan	5,442	47.87	−9.32	$45,057.75
Liberal	Willard Reaves	4,213	37.06	+19.44	$19,578.06
New Democratic	Trudy Schroeder	1,714	15.08	−2.81	$0.00
Total valid votes/expense limit		11,369	99.61	–	$66,506.00
Total rejected and declined ballots		45	0.39	–	
Turnout		11,414	64.37	+4.02	
Eligible voters		17,732			
Progressive Conservative hold		Swing		−14.38	
Source(s) Source: Elections Manitoba

Manitoba provincial by-election, March 22, 2022: Fort Whyte Resignation of Brian Pallister
Party	Candidate	Votes	%	±%	Expenditures
Progressive Conservative	Obby Khan	3,050	42.51	−14.68	
Liberal	Willard Reaves	2,853	39.77	+22.53	
New Democratic	Trudy Schroeder	1,112	15.50	−2.38	
Independent	Patrick Allard	101	1.41	—	
Green	Nicolas Geddert	55	0.77	−6.00	
Total valid votes		7,174			
Total rejected ballots		15	0.21	−0.33	
Turnout		7,189	42.62	−14.57	
Eligible voters		15,907	—	−0.29	
Progressive Conservative hold		Swing		−18.61	
Source: Elections Manitoba
