= Dwaine Wilson =

American football player (1960–2008)

No. 30
- Position: Running back

Personal information
- Born: June 11, 1960; Carson, California, U.S.
- Died: April 12, 2008 (aged 47); Lake Elsinore, California, U.S.

Career information
- College: Idaho State University

Career history
- 1984–1985: Montreal Concordes
- 1987: Los Angeles Rams

Awards and highlights
- CFL All-Star (1984); CFL's Most Outstanding Rookie Award (1984)

Dwaine Wilson (June 11, 1960 – April 12, 2008) was an American player of gridiron football, a running back during a brief Canadian Football League (CFL) career.

A graduate of Idaho State University in Pocatello, Idaho, he played two seasons for the Montreal Concordes (part of the Montreal Alouettes franchise history). In 1984, he played 16 games and in 1985 he played 13 games.

In 1984, he rushed 226 times for 1083 yards, which won him all-star accolades and CFL's Most Outstanding Rookie Award. In 1985, his production fell off to 435 yards rushing in his second and final CFL season.

Wilson drowned on April 12, 2008, while boating with friends at Lake Elsinore, California.
