= Joe Poplawski =

Canadian football player (born 1957)

No. 71
- Positions: Slotback, Wide receiver

Personal information
- Born: August 2, 1957 (age 69); Edmonton, Alberta, Canada
- Listed height: 6 ft 1 in (1.85 m)
- Listed weight: 180 lb (82 kg)

Career information
- University: Alberta
- CFL draft: 1978: Terr. Exemptionth round

Career history
- 1978: Edmonton Eskimos*
- 1978–1986: Winnipeg Blue Bombers
- * Offseason or practice squad member only

Awards and highlights
- Grey Cup champion (1984); 2× CFL's Most Outstanding Canadian Award (1981, 1986); 5× Dr. Beattie Martin Trophy (1978, 1981, 1984-1986); CFL's Most Outstanding Rookie Award (1978); Jackie Parker Trophy (1978); 5× CFL All-Star (1978, 1981, 1984, 1985, 1986); 5× CFL West All-Star (1978, 1981, 1984, 1985, 1986)
- Canadian Football Hall of Fame (Class of 1998)

Joe Poplawski (born August 2, 1957) is a Canadian former professional football receiver who played for the Winnipeg Blue Bombers in the Canadian Football League (CFL) from 1978 to 1986.

== Professional career ==
Poplawski was originally a territorial exemption his hometown team the Edmonton Eskimos and prior to the beginning of the 1978 season he was traded to the Bombers in exchange for their star receiver Tom Scott. With 75 receptions for 998 yards and 8 touchdowns, Poplawski won the CFL's Most Outstanding Rookie Award in 1978. That season he was also selected to the Western Conference and CFL all-star team as a wide receiver. Despite a short career Poplawski achieved many more accolades including twice winning the Most Outstanding Canadian awards in 1981 and 1986. He was also the runner-up for this award in 1980, 1984 and 1985. He was selected to the All-Star team five times, first as mentioned above and four more times as a slotback in 1981, 1984, 1985, and 1986. Poplawski helped the Bombers win the 72nd Grey Cup in 1984 with five catches for 101 yards and a touchdown. At the age of 29, he ended career with 8,341 receiving yards on 549 receptions and with 48 touchdowns. In his final season, he temporarily filled in as the team's kicker, following an injury to Trevor Kennerd. Poplawski made 8 out of 10 field goals, totalling 233 yards, with his longest coming from 45 yards out.

== Statistics ==
Receiving		Regular season
Year	Team	Games	Rec	Yards	Avg	Long	TD
1978	WPG	16	75	998	13.3	44	8
1979	WPG	2	3	35	11.7	17	0
1980	WPG	14	56	897	16.0	68	5
1981	WPG	16	84	1,271	15.1	55	8
1982	WPG	16	57	825	14.5	47	2
1983	WPG	15	58	971	15.7	41	8
1984	WPG	16	67	998	14.9	62	3
1985	WPG	16	75	1,271	16.9	47	6
1986	WPG	18	74	1,075	14.5	65	8
CFL totals		129	549	8,341	15.2	68	48

== Post-playing career ==
After leaving football Poplawski pursued a career as a professional soccer player. Currently he heads up the Cavalier Drive branch of Ranger Insurance in Winnipeg, acquired in July 2014 by Arthur J. Gallagher Canada Limited. Poplawski also worked as an analyst for CJOB radio alongside play by play man Bob Irving.

In 2005, Poplawski was named one of the Blue Bombers 20 All-Time Greats and was elected into the Canadian Football Hall of Fame in 1998. Inducted into the Manitoba Sports Hall of Fame and Museum in 2004.
