= John Bonk =

Canadian football player

No. 43
- Position: Centre

Personal information
- Born: August 27, 1950 (age 76); Stoney Creek, Ontario, Canada
- Listed height: 6 ft 3 in (1.91 m)
- Listed weight: 260 lb (118 kg)

Career information
- High school: Delta

Career history
- 1972–1973: Hamilton Tiger-Cats
- 1973–1985: Winnipeg Blue Bombers

Awards and highlights
- 2× Grey Cup champion (1972, 1984); CFL's Most Outstanding Offensive Lineman Award (1984); 2× DeMarco–Becket Memorial Trophy (1983, 1984); 4× CFL All-Star (1982, 1983, 1984, 1985); 4× CFL West All-Star (1982, 1983, 1984, 1985)
- Canadian Football Hall of Fame (Class of 2008)

John Bonk (born August 27, 1950) is a Canadian former professional football offensive lineman in the Canadian Football League (CFL). The four-time All-Star played from 1973 to 1985 for the Winnipeg Blue Bombers. Bonk won the CFL's Most Outstanding Offensive Lineman Award in 1984. He also won the 60th Grey Cup with Hamilton in 1972 and the 72nd Grey Cup with Winnipeg in 1984. He played in 204 consecutive games.

In 2008, Bonk was inducted into the Canadian Football Hall of Fame.
