= Steve Raquet =

American football player (born 1962)

No. 49, 99
- Position: Defensive end

Personal information
- Born: February 1, 1962 (age 64); Buffalo, New York, U.S.
- Listed height: 6 ft 5 in (1.96 m)
- Listed weight: 240 lb (109 kg)

Career information
- High school: Clarence (Clarence, New York)
- College: Holy Cross
- NFL draft: 1984: 12th round, 316th overall pick

Career history
- Montreal Concordes/Alouettes (1984–1986)

Awards and highlights
- CFL All-Star (1984); CFL East All-Star (1984)

Steven J. Raquet (born February 1, 1962) is an American former professional football defensive end who played three seasons in the Canadian Football League (CFL) with the Montreal Concordes/Alouettes. He played college football at the College of the Holy Cross.

== Early life ==
Steven J. Raquet was born on February 1, 1962, in Buffalo, New York. He attended Clarence High School in Clarence, New York.

Raquet played college football at the College of the Holy Cross, where he was a member of the Holy Cross Crusaders from 1980 to 1983. He recorded 87 tackles, nine sacks, three fumble recoveries, and six pass breakups as a senior in 1983, earning first-team All-American honors. He posted college career totals of 281 tackles, eight fumble recoveries, three interceptions, 15 pass breakups, and a school-record 19 sacks. Raquet was inducted into the Holy Cross Athletic Hall of Fame in 2007.

== Professional career ==
On January 4, 1984, Raquet was selected by the Oakland Invaders in the eighth round, with the 162nd overall pick, of the 1984 USFL draft. On April 10, 1984, it was reported that Raquet had signed a three-year contract with the Montreal Concordes of the Canadian Football League (CFL). On May 2, 1984, the Cincinnati Bengals selected Raquet in the 12th round, with the 316th overall pick, of the 1984 NFL draft. The Bengals were unaware that Raquet had already signed with the Concordes. Raquet earned CFL All-Star and CFL East All-Star honors as a rookie in 1984 after posting 15 sacks. He played in 43 games for Montreal from 1984 to 1986, totaling 29 sacks, one interception, and seven fumble recoveries. Raquet was released by the Alouettes on June 19, 1987, in favor of rookie Dan Sellers. Head coach Joe Faragalli said "I don't know if Sellers is the answer. If he isn't we'll bring another guy in." Raquet was surprised by the decision, stating "The only reason why I'm surprised is that I saw no one better than me. I'm no Lawrence Taylor or James Parker. If Parker was here, I'd expect to be released. But I expected to keep my job until they got someone who was better." The Alouettes folded a few days later.
