= Canadian Football League Players' Association =

Canadian trade union

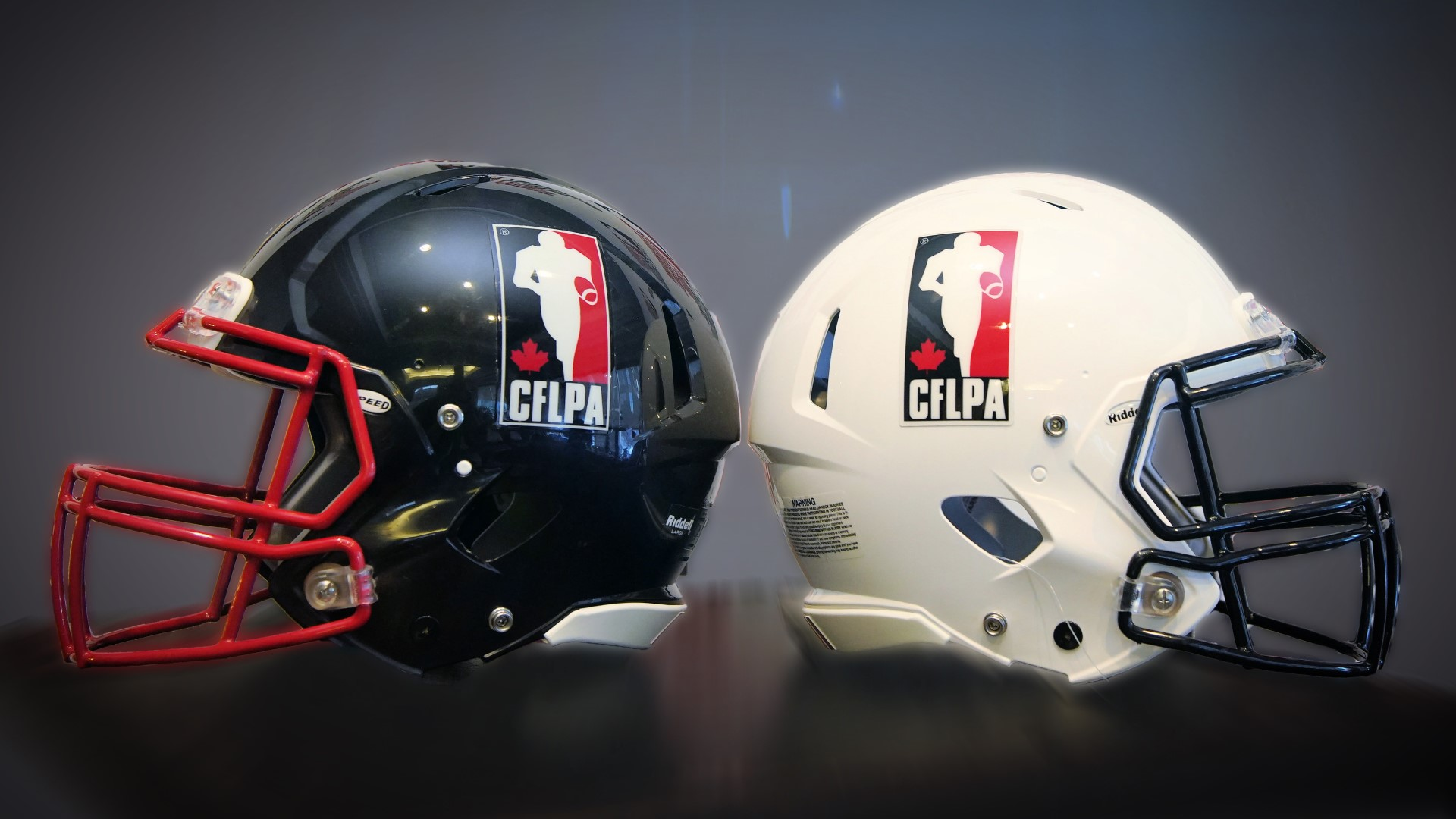
- CFLPA football helmets
- Abbreviation: CFLPA
- Formation: 1965; 61 years ago
- President: Solomon Elimimian
- Executive Director (Interim): Peter Dyakowski
- Treasurer: Adam Bighill
- 1st Vice President: Brett Lauther
- Website: cflpa.com

The Canadian Football League Players' Association (CFLPA) represents Canadian football players in the Canadian Football League (CFL). The association was established in 1965, when local lawyer John Agro became concerned by the number of Hamilton Tiger-Cats players approaching him with legal questions about contracts, medical coverage and pensions.

All CFLPA presidents have been active or retired CFL players. The first president was Gary Schreider, who had recently retired as a player for the Ottawa Rough Riders upon the union's founding. The current president (since 2020) is Solomon Elimimian.

In June 2010, the CFLPA and the CFL announced the details of a new four-year collective bargaining agreement.

The CFL's annual John Agro Special Teams Award, voted on by the players, is named for CFLPA co-founder and long-time legal counsel John Agro, QC.

On April 18, 2024, the CFLPA affiliated with the Canadian Labour Congress.

== Presidents ==
- Gary Schreider (1965–1970)
- Mike Wadsworth (1970–1971)
- Greg Findlay (1971–1972)
- George Reed (1972–1981)
- Ed Chalupka (1981–1986)
- George Reed (1986–1993)
- Dan Ferrone (1993–2000)
- Stu Laird (2000–2012)
- Mike Morreale (2012–2014)
- Scott Flory (2014–2016)
- Jeff Keeping (2016–2020)
- Solomon Elimimian (2020–present)

== See also ==
- List of trade unions in Canada
