= Nick Bastaja =

English gridiron football player (born 1953)

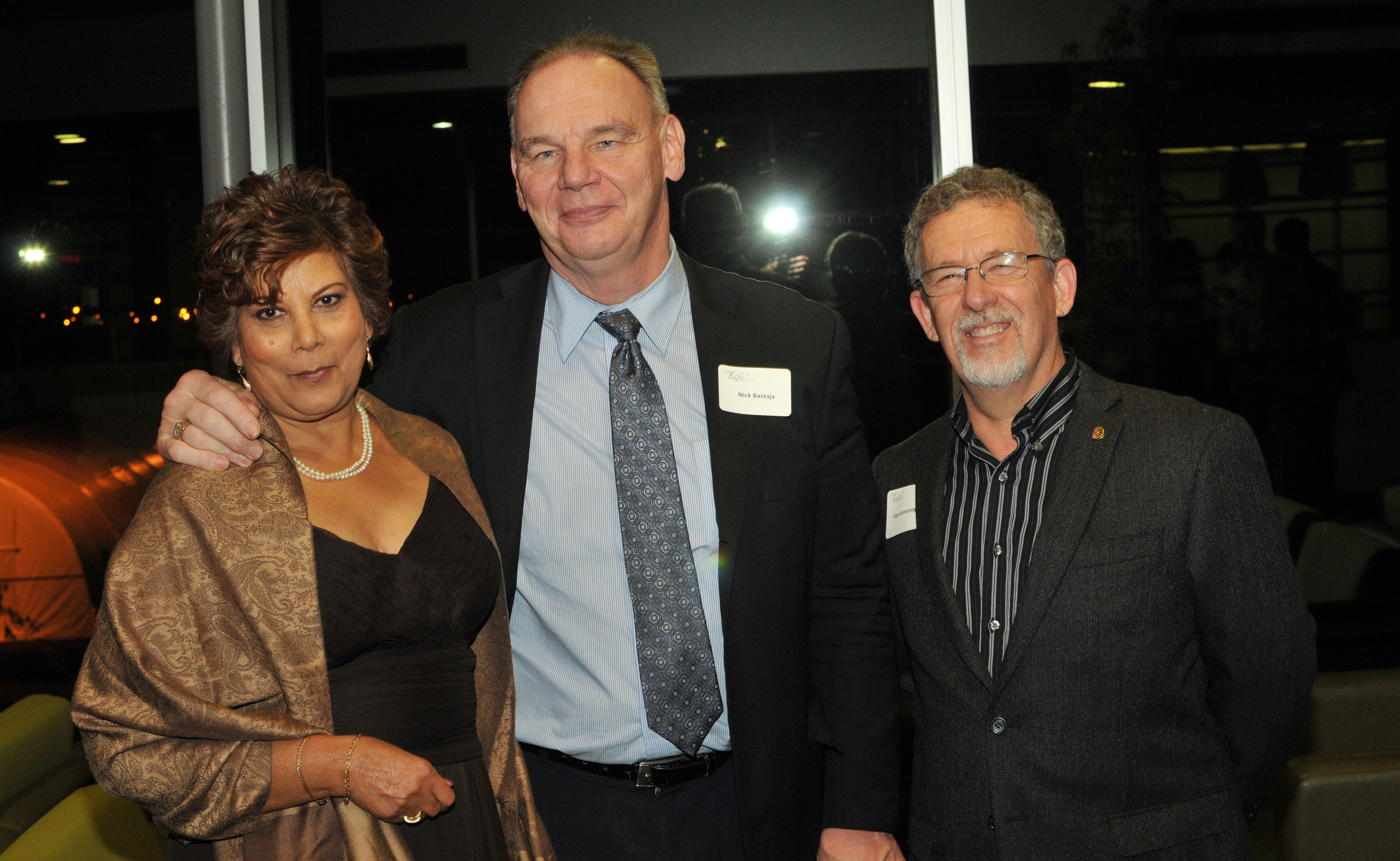
- Nick Bastaja (centre)

No. 65
- Position: Guard

Personal information
- Born: February 4, 1953 (age 73); Grantham, England

Career history
- 1975–1976: Hamilton Tiger-Cats
- 1977–1979: Toronto Argonauts
- 1980–1988: Winnipeg Blue Bombers

Awards and highlights
- 2× Grey Cup champion (1984, 1988); CFL's Most Outstanding Offensive Lineman Award (1984); DeMarco–Becket Memorial Trophy (1984); 2× CFL All-Star (1984, 1985)

Nick Bastaja (born February 4, 1953) is a former professional Canadian football offensive lineman who played fourteen seasons in the Canadian Football League (CFL). He was a member of the Grey Cup championship-winning Winnipeg Blue Bombers teams of 1984 and 1988. Bastaja also received the CFL's Most Outstanding Offensive Lineman Award in the 1985 CFL season.

After his retirement as a player, Bastaja spent two seasons as a colour commentator for CFL games on the Canadian Football Network.
