= J. C. Sherritt =

American gridiron football player and coach (born 1985)

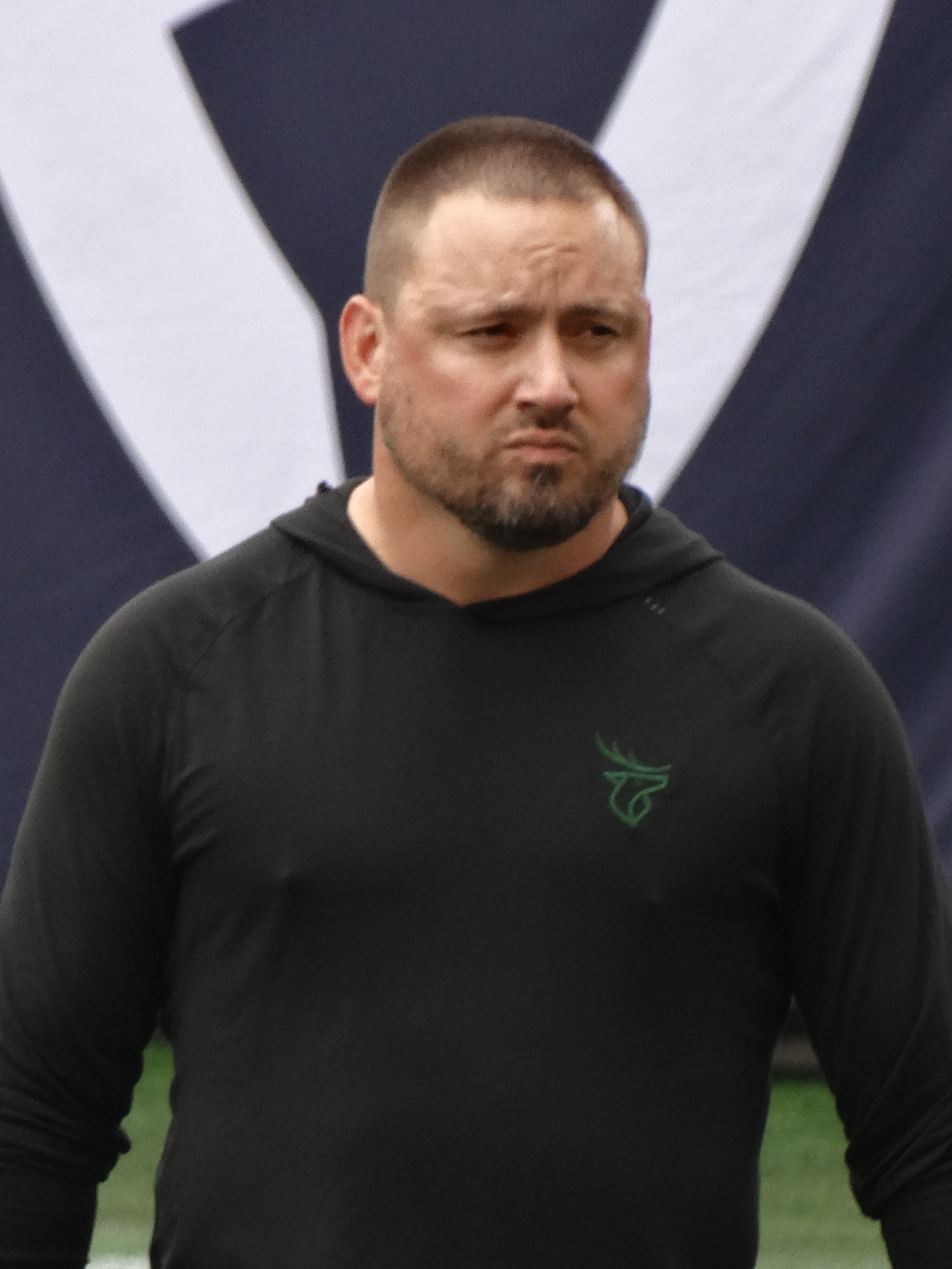
- Sherritt with the Edmonton Elks in 2025

Edmonton Elks
- Title: Defensive coordinator, linebackers coach

Personal information
- Born: May 2, 1988 (age 38); Truckee, California, U.S.
- Listed height: 5 ft 9 in (1.75 m)
- Listed weight: 220 lb (100 kg)

Career information
- Position: Linebacker (No. 47)
- High school: Pullman
- College: Eastern Washington
- NFL draft: 2011: undrafted

Career history

Playing
- Edmonton Eskimos (2011–2018)

Coaching
- Calgary Stampeders (2019) Linebackers coach; Cal Poly (2020–2023) Defensive coordinator Linebackers coach; Saskatchewan Roughriders (2024) Linebackers coach Run game coordinator; Edmonton Elks (2025–present) Defensive coordinator Linebackers coach

Awards and highlights
- 2× Grey Cup champion (2015, 2026); CFL's Most Outstanding Defensive Player Award (2012); Norm Fieldgate Trophy (2012); Jackie Parker Trophy (2011); CFL All-Star (2012); FCS national champion (2010); Big Sky Defensive Player of the Year (2010); Buck Buchanan Award (2010); 2× Consensus First-team FCS All-American (AFCA, AP, TSN, WCFF) (2009, 2010)
- Stats at CFL.ca

John Cody Sherritt (born May 2, 1988) is the defensive coordinator and linebackers coach for the Edmonton Elks of the Canadian Football League (CFL). He is a former Canadian football linebacker who played in eight seasons for the Edmonton Eskimos and won one Grey Cup championship in 2015. Sherritt played his college football at Eastern Washington and was the 2010 recipient of the Buck Buchanan Award.

== Early life ==
In 2006 Sherritt graduated from Pullman High School in Pullman, Washington, where he played linebacker and running back, helping lead his team to a perfect 14–0 record and the State 2A Championship. Sherritt received an offer to walk on at Washington State, but Sherritt decided to attend Eastern Washington, which gave him his only Division I scholarship offer.

== College career ==
Sherritt played 49 games over four seasons for the Eastern Washington Eagles. As a senior, he finished the regular season ranked 10th in the FCS with 11.36 tackles per game. Sherritt also became the first player in school history with more than 400 career tackles and helped lead Eastern Washington to the 2010 FCS National Championship. He was named the Big Sky Conference Defensive Player of the Year and won the Buck Buchanan Award as the FCS' top defensive player of the year. Sherritt led the FCS with 170 tackles in 2009, and he ranked third in 2010 with 150 (11.5 per game).

== Professional career ==
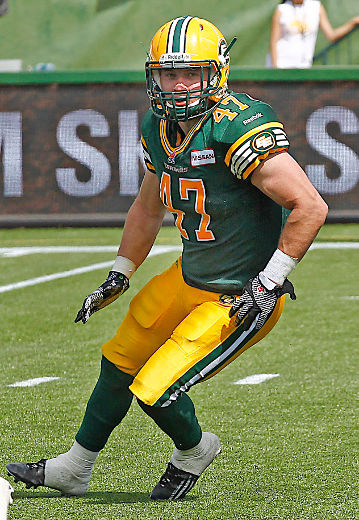
Sherritt with the Edmonton Eskimos in 2013

Sherritt went undrafted in the 2011 NFL draft, but signed a free agent contract on April 20, 2011, with the Edmonton Eskimos of the Canadian Football League (CFL). In his first year in the league (2011) Sherritt became a key component of the Eskimos defense. He amassed 72 tackles, 13 special teams tackles, and 3 quarterback sacks. JC Sherritt had an even better year in his second season in the CFL. Sherritt finished the 2012 CFL season with a CFL record 130 tackles; despite missing 1 game due to injury. He surpassed the previous record of 129 tackles by Calvin Tiggle from 1994. He was named a CFL West All-Star, CFL All-Star, and also named the CFL's Most Outstanding Defensive Player. After his outstanding 2012 season, Sherritt was rewarded with a three-year contract extension by the Eskimos.

Sherritt suffered a broken thumb in Week 6 of the 2013 CFL season, he underwent surgery on it during the following bye week. At the time of his injury he had 37 tackles through 6 games. Sherritt missed 4 games following his surgery to repair his broken thumb. In Week 15, he re-fractured the same thumb and was listed as out-indefinitely. Sherritt continued to be an important contributor on the Eskimos defense over the next three seasons, totaling 70 tackles in 2015 and 77 in 2016. In the first game of the 2017 season Sherritt left the game after suffering an apparent Achilles injury. On June 26, 2017 it was announced that Sherritt would miss the remainder of the season with a ruptured Achilles. Despite missing almost the entire 2017 season Sherritt and the Eskimos agreed to a two-year contract extension on February 9, 2018. In 2018, he played in all 18 games and recorded 100 defensive tackles, three sacks, and two interceptions. On January 16, 2019, he announced his retirement.

== Coaching career ==
=== Calgary Stampeders ===
On January 28, 2019, it was announced that Sherritt had been hired by the Calgary Stampeders to be their linebackers coach.

=== Cal Poly Mustangs ===
In January 2020, Sherritt was hired by new head coach Beau Baldwin at Cal Poly originally as the linebackers coach and co-special teams coordinator, but was later announced as the defensive coordinator in February 2020.

=== Saskatchewan Roughriders ===
On January 15, 2024, it was announced that Sherritt had been named the linebackers coach and pass game coordinator for the Saskatchewan Roughriders. He served in that capacity for one season, but did not return in 2025 amid reports that he had joined the coaching staff for the Edmonton Elks.

=== Edmonton Elks ===
On January 10, 2025, the Edmonton Elks announced that Sherritt was hired as the team's defensive coordinator and linebackers coach.
