= Ricky Barden =

American football player (born 1958)

No. 25, 26
- Positions: Cornerback, defensive halfback

Personal information
- Born: June 6, 1958 (age 68); Norfolk, Virginia, U.S.
- Listed height: 5 ft 9 in (1.75 m)
- Listed weight: 185 lb (84 kg)

Career information
- High school: Lake Taylor (Norfolk)
- College: North Carolina
- NFL draft: 1980: undrafted

Career history
- Atlanta Falcons (1980)*; Ottawa Rough Riders (1981–1986); Edmonton Eskimos (1987)*
- * Offseason or practice squad member only

Awards and highlights
- 2× CFL East All-Star (1984–1985)

Ricky Antonio Barden (born June 6, 1958) is an American former professional football defensive back who played six seasons in the Canadian Football League (CFL) with the Ottawa Rough Riders. He played college football at the University of North Carolina at Chapel Hill.

== Early life and college ==
Ricky Antonio Barden was born on June 6, 1958, in Norfolk, Virginia. He attended Lake Taylor High School in Norfolk.

Barden was a four-year letterman for the North Carolina Tar Heels of the University of North Carolina at Chapel Hill from 1976 to 1979. He was a two-year starter at cornerback from 1977 to 1978 before moving to strong safety as a senior. He had 103 tackles and two interceptions in 1979, earning second-team All-American honors. Barden recorded college career totals of nine interceptions for 156 yards and 47 punt returns for 281 yards. He majored in recreation administration at North Carolina. His 1990 Tar Heels trading card states "Ricky Barden is regarded by many as the greatest defensive back in Carolina history."

== Professional career ==
After going undrafted in the 1980 NFL draft, Barden signed with the Atlanta Falcons in May 1980. He was later released on August 4, 1980, before the team's first preseason game. He had reportedly suffered a pulled hamstring.

Barden was signed by the Ottawa Rough Riders of the Canadian Football League (CFL) on May 5, 1981. He was named a CFL East in both 1984 and 1985. He dressed in 72 games for the Rough Riders from 1981 to 1986, totaling 15 interceptions for 236 yards, 1.5 sacks, 13 fumble recoveries for 72 yards and two touchdowns, 38 kickoff returns for 860 yards, and 18 punt returns for 178 yards. Barden suffered a torn ACL midway through the 1986 season. He was in the option year of his contract at the time and also had well-documented personality differences with Ottawa head coach Joe Moss.

Barden signed with the Edmonton Eskimos of the CFL in 1987. He was released on June 19, 1987, before the start of the season.
