= John Grace (Canadian football) =

American gridiron football player (born 1977)

Profile
- Position: Linebacker

Personal information
- Born: October 2, 1977 (age 49); Okeechobee, Florida, U.S.

Career information
- College: Marshall
- NFL draft: 2000: undrafted

Career history
- 2000–2001: Montreal Alouettes
- 2002–2003: Ottawa Renegades
- 2004–2006: Calgary Stampeders
- 2007: Montreal Alouettes

Awards and highlights
- CFL's Most Outstanding Defensive Player Award (2005); 2× Norm Fieldgate Trophy (2004, 2005); 3× CFL All-Star (2002, 2004, 2005); CFL East All-Star (2002); 2× CFL West All-Star =(2004, 2005); NCAA I-AA national champion (1996); First-team All-MAC (1999); Second-team All-MAC (1998)

John Grace (born October 2, 1977) is an American former professional football linebacker who played in the Canadian Football League (CFL).

== College career ==
Grace attended Marshall University, and was a two-time Team Defensive MVP, a two-time All-MAC selection, and was the 1998 Motor City Bowl MVP. He finished his stellar college career with 15 sacks, and 437 tackles.

== Professional career ==
Grace joined the CFL in 2000, playing 6 games for the Montreal Alouettes over 2 seasons. In 2002, he played for the Ottawa Renegades, and was an all star. After another season in Ottawa, he moved to the Calgary Stampeders, where he was an all star in 2004 and 2005, and won the CFL's Most Outstanding Defensive Player Award in 2005. After returning to Calgary in 2006, Grace was again signed as a free agent by the Montreal Alouettes during the off-season, and retired after the 2007 season when he was released by Montreal.
