= Adam Bighill =

American gridiron football player (born 1988)

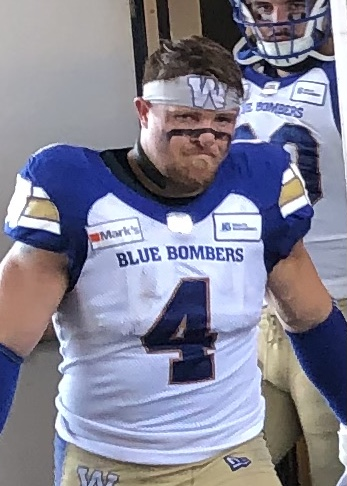
- Bighill with the Winnipeg Blue Bombers in 2021

Profile
- Position: Linebacker

Personal information
- Born: October 16, 1988 (age 38); Montesano, Washington, U.S.
- Listed height: 5 ft 10 in (1.78 m)
- Listed weight: 241 lb (109 kg)

Career information
- High school: Montesano (WA)
- College: Central Washington

Career history
- 2011–2016: BC Lions
- 2017: New Orleans Saints
- 2018–2024: Winnipeg Blue Bombers
- 2025: Calgary Stampeders

Awards and highlights
- 3× Grey Cup champion (2011, 2019, 2021); 3× CFL Most Outstanding Defensive Player (2015, 2018, 2021); Tom Pate Memorial Award (2024); 3× Norm Fieldgate Trophy (2015, 2018, 2021); 6× CFL All-Star (2012, 2013, 2015, 2016, 2018, 2021); 8× CFL West All-Star (2012, 2013, 2014, 2015, 2016, 2018, 2021, 2022)

Career CFL statistics as of 2025
- Tackles: 1,023
- Sacks: 50
- Interceptions: 15
- Forced fumbles: 14
- Stats at CFL.ca
- Stats at Pro Football Reference

Adam Bighill (born October 16, 1988) is a former American professional football linebacker. He most recently played for the Calgary Stampeders of the Canadian Football League (CFL). He is a three-time Grey Cup champion, winning with the BC Lions in 2011 and twice more with the Winnipeg Blue Bombers in 2019 and 2021. He is a three-time winner of the CFL's Most Outstanding Defensive Player Award and is a six-time CFL All-Star and eight-time CFL West All-Star. He also spent time with the New Orleans Saints of the National Football League (NFL). He played college football for the Central Washington Wildcats.

== Professional career ==
=== BC Lions ===
After going undrafted in the 2011 NFL draft, Bighill signed as a free agent with the BC Lions of the Canadian Football League (CFL) on May 31, 2011. Bighill had an impressive rookie season, playing an increased role as the season progressed. He played in 12 games, including the final seven regular season games, and the West Final and Grey Cup games. He led the club, and was ranked fourth overall in the CFL, with 22 special team tackles.

Bighill began the 2012 CFL season by replacing Solomon Elimimian at middle linebacker for the Lions, after Elimimian was signed by the Minnesota Vikings. After assuming the starting linebacker role, Bighill went on to amass 104 tackles (2nd most in the CFL) and 4 interceptions. Elimimian returned to the Lions midway through the season, but Bighill retained all of the playing time. He was named both a CFL West All-Star and a CFL All-Star for the 2012 season.

Bighill and Elimimian both returned to the Lions linebacker core for the 2013 CFL season. Bighill suffered a sprained ankle and missed Week 3 and 4. He played in the 16 other regular season games, and the Lions' lone playoff game. Bighill put together a strong 2013 season, accumulating 92 tackles, 12 special teams tackles, 9 sacks, 1 interception and 3 fumble recoveries (one of which he returned for a touchdown; his first of his career). In 2014, Bighill played in all but one of the 18 regular season games as well as one playoff game. He totalled 77 tackles, 12 special teams tackles, 6 sacks, 1 interception, and 1 fumble recovery. Following the season, Bighill's linebacker teammate, Solomon Elimimian, was named the leagues MOP, and both of them signed 3-year contract extensions on the same day.

In Bighill's fifth season with the Lions he played in all but one game of the regular season, contributing a league leading 117 tackles. Following the season, Bighill was named the CFL's Top Defensive Player. Bighill continued his dominant play in the 2016 season finishing 3rd in the league in tackles and earning his fourth CFL All-Star award in the past five seasons. On December 9, 2016, the BC Lions granted Bighill a release as per the agreements in his contract which allows him to pursue an NFL contract up until January 27, 2017. If he is unable to sign an NFL contract by that date he will be back under contract with the BC Lions through the 2018 CFL season. Through six CFL seasons Bighill amassed 489 defensive tackles, 69 special teams tackles, 33 sacks, 8 interceptions, 8 forced fumbles and 1 defensive touchdown.

Bighill had a workout with the New Orleans Saints on December 13, 2016.

=== New Orleans Saints ===
Bighill signed a future/reserve contract with the New Orleans Saints on January 4, 2017. Bighill drew strongly positive attention for his performance during the Saints training camp and preseason. He was waived on September 2, and was signed to the Saints' practice squad the next day. He was promoted to the active roster on September 11. Bighill was released the following day, and was re-signed to the practice squad on September 14. He was promoted back to the active roster on October 12. Bighill was waived again on October 17, and re-signed to the practice squad. He was promoted back to the active roster on November 18. Bighill was waived two days later and re-signed to the practice squad.

Bighill signed a reserve/future contract with the Saints on January 16, 2018 On May 14, Bighill asked for release from the Saints and was waived. Bighill played in three NFL games, contributing with one special teams tackle.

=== Winnipeg Blue Bombers ===
Bighill signed a one-year deal with the Winnipeg Blue Bombers on May 19, 2018. Bighill finished the 2018 season as the Blue Bomber's nominee for Most Outstanding Player, was named to the CFL All-Star team, and was ultimately named the CFL's Most Outstanding Defensive Player. The Blue Bombers signed Bighill to a 3-year $750,000 contract extension in January 2019, making him the highest paid defensive player in the CFL. Bighill helped lead the defence for the Bombers as they defeated Hamilton 33–12 in the 107th Grey Cup, the game saw Bighill recover a fumble which led to an Andrew Harris touchdown. After the win Bighill said that "I've packed too many garbage bags. I only play this game to win championships. We're bringing it home to Winnipeg, it doesn't get any better than that."

The Bombers were set to defend their title during the 2020 CFL season although it was cancelled because of the ongoing pandemic. Bighill was scheduled to make $265,000 in the following season, but he took a $145,000 pay cut to stay with the Bombers and help the team in a league that was troubled financially by the pandemic. Bighill would go on to lead an excellent Bombers' defence that would lead the league in yards and points allowed. He had an acrobatic interception against Cody Fajardo during the 2021 Banjo Bowl. Bighill would finish the season with 70 tackles, two sacks, and two interceptions. His incredible season would result in him being announced the CFL's Most Outstanding Defensive Player for 2021, as well as a CFL All-Star. Bighill and the Bombers defeated the Saskatchewan Roughriders for the third time that season in the CFL West Division Final, as they would go on to their second Grey Cup game in a row. In the 2021 Grey Cup the Bombers trailed Hamilton late in the fourth quarter by a score of 22-10 but would rally to go on and win 33–25 in overtime for their second Grey Cup in a row. This was Bighill's third Grey Cup title. Following the season, on January 20, 2022, Bighill and the Blue Bombers agreed to a one-year contract extension.

Bighill was named a CFL West All-Star for the eighth time in his career following the 2022 season in which the Blue Bombers advanced to the Grey Cup final for the third consecutive season. He had one defensive tackle in the 109th Grey Cup, but the Blue Bombers were defeated by the Toronto Argonauts. On November 29, 2022, the Bombers announced that Bighill had re-signed with the club on a new two-year contract.

In 2023, Bighill played and started in 17 regular season games where he had 74 defensive tackles, four sacks, and one interception. He played in his fourth straight Grey Cup game, but the Blue Bombers lost to the Montreal Alouettes. In the 2024 season, he played in the first ten games of the season where he had 48 defensive tackles and one sack before an injury sidelined him for the remainder of the season. In January 2025, Bighill indicated that the Blue Bombers would not be offering him a new contract for the 2025 season. He became a free agent upon the expiry of his contract on February 11, 2025.

=== Calgary Stampeders ===
On June 22, 2025, it was announced that Bighill had signed a practice roster agreement with the Calgary Stampeders. He played in six regular season games in 2025 where he had 12 defensive tackles and one special teams tackle. He became a free agent upon the expiry of his contract on February 10, 2026.

=== Retirement ===
On April 21, 2026, Bighill signed a one-day contract with the Winnipeg Blue Bombers to officially retire with the team.

== Statistics ==
		Defence
Year	Team	GP	GS	DT	STT	QS	Int	FF	FR	TD
2011	BC	12	0	7	22	0	0	0	1	0
2012	BC	18	18	104	16	9	4	2	1	0
2013	BC	16	15	92	12	9	1	4	3	1
2014	BC	17	17	77	12	6	1	2	1	0
2015	BC	18	17	121	7	4	1	0	1	0
2016	BC	18	18	108	1	5	1	0	0	0
2018	WPG	18	18	105	1	4	2	4	1	1
2019	WPG	15	15	61	0	4	2	2	0	0
2020	WPG	Season cancelled
2021	WPG	14	14	70	0	2	2	0	2	1
2022	WPG	18	18	72	0	2	1	0	0	0
2023	WPG	17	17	74	0	4	1	0	0	1
2024	WPG	10	10	48	0	1	0	0	0	0
2025	CGY	6	1	12	1	0	0	0	0	0
CFL totals		197	178	951	72	50	16	14	10	4

== Personal life ==
Bighill was born with a bilateral cleft lip and palate. He is President of the Canadian charity Making Faces, a charity dedicated to helping people cope with facial differences. His son Beau was also born with a bilateral cleft lip. After Wendy Williams mocked Joaquin Phoenix on her show in 2020 because of his cleft lip, Bighill relentlessly called her out and requested an apology. Williams did end up making an apology to Bighill on Twitter, as well as making two donations to cleft related charities and wished his son Beau good luck on his upcoming surgery.
