= Danny Bass =

American gridiron football player (born 1958)

No. 49, 30
- Position: Linebacker

Personal information
- Born: March 31, 1958 (age 68); Bath, Michigan, U.S.

Career information
- College: Michigan State

Career history
- 1980: Toronto Argonauts
- 1981–1983: Calgary Stampeders
- 1984–1991: Edmonton Eskimos

Awards and highlights
- Grey Cup champion (1987); CFL's Most Outstanding Defensive Player Award (1989); 3× Norm Fieldgate Trophy (1983, 1988, 1989); 6× CFL All-Star (1982, 1983, 1986, 1988, 1989, 1990); 6× CFL West All-Star (1982, 1983, 1986, 1988, 1989, 1990); Edmonton Eskimos Wall of Honour (1992); Second-team All-American (1979); First-team All-Big Ten (1979)
- Canadian Football Hall of Fame (Class of 2000)

Danny Bass (born March 31, 1958) is an American former professional football linebacker who played in the Canadian Football League (CFL). He played for the Toronto Argonauts in 1980, the Calgary Stampeders from 1981 to 1983, and the Edmonton Eskimos from 1984 to 1991. He won a Grey Cup for the Eskimos and played in another two for them. Bass was voted one of the CFL's top 50 players (#44) by Canadian sports network TSN.

Bass was the MVP of Michigan State University, his senior season of 1979. He is the all-time leader in career tackles for the Spartans.

Bass was inducted into the Canadian Football Hall of Fame in 2000.
