= Wylie Turner =

American football player (born 1957)

No. 20, 28
- Position: Cornerback

Personal information
- Born: April 19, 1957 (age 69); Dallas, Texas, U.S.
- Listed height: 5 ft 10 in (1.78 m)
- Listed weight: 182 lb (83 kg)

Career information
- High school: W. T. White (TX)
- College: Angelo State
- NFL draft: 1979: undrafted

Career history
- Denver Broncos (1979)*; Green Bay Packers (1979-1980); Winnipeg Blue Bombers (1982–1986); Ottawa Rough Riders (1986)
- * Offseason or practice squad member only

Awards and highlights
- CFL West All-Star (1985)

Career NFL statistics
- Interceptions: 2
- Stats at Pro Football Reference

Wylie Dewayen Turner (born April 19, 1957) is an American former professional football player in the National Football League (NFL). Turner was born on April 19, 1957, in Dallas, Texas, where he attended W. T. White High School. In high school, he played football and ran track-and-field. Although he signed a letter of intent with Texas Southern University, he ended up going to Angelo State University so that he could run track-and-field and play for their football team. He started out as a running back, but was converted to cornerback. He was also the team's kick returner, leading college football in return yard average in 1977, which included a 104-yard return for a touchdown. Turner became an accomplished college track-and-field runner, competing in the 100-meter and 200-meter dashes. He was the NAIA champion at 200-meters in 1977.

Turner went undrafted in the 1979 NFL draft. He signed as a free agent with the Denver Broncos but was cut from the team in August 1979. He then signed with the Green Bay Packers the next month. During the 1979 NFL season, he was primarily a back-up and special teams player, recording 12 total tackles and recovering one onside kick. Turner played for the Packers for a total of two seasons, appearing in 28 games and recording 2 interceptions. He was competing for the starting cornerback position prior to the 1981 NFL season but did not play for the Packers that year.

Turner later played in the Canadian Football League (CFL) for the Winnipeg Blue Bombers from 1982 to 1986 and the Ottawa Rough Riders in 1986. He was named a CFL West All-Star in 1985.

Turner was inducted into the Angelo State Sports Hall of Honor in 2018.
