= Ron Robinson (Canadian football) =

American gridiron football player (born 1956)

No. 16
- Positions: Slotback, wide receiver

Personal information
- Born: January 1, 1956 (age 70); San Francisco, California, U.S.

Career information
- College: Utah State

Career history
- 1980–1981: Calgary Stampeders
- 1982–1983: Saskatchewan Roughriders
- 1983–1984: Montreal Concordes
- 1984–1985: BC Lions

Awards and highlights
- Grey Cup champion (1985); CFL All-Star (1983)

Ron Robinson (born January 1, 1956) is an American former professional football slotback and wide receiver who played six seasons in the Canadian Football League (CFL), mainly for the Montreal Concordes. He was a part of the BC Lions 1985 Grey Cup victory. Robinson played college football at Utah State University.
