= David Shaw (Canadian football) =

American gridiron football player (1953–2024)

No. 36
- Position: Defensive back

Personal information
- Born: April 11, 1953; Mountain Home, Idaho, U.S.
- Died: October 3, 2024 (aged 71)
- Listed height: 6 ft 0 in (1.83 m)
- Listed weight: 180 lb (82 kg)

Career information
- College: Prairie View A&M

Career history
- 1975–1982: Hamilton Tiger-Cats
- 1983–1986: Winnipeg Blue Bombers

Awards and highlights
- Grey Cup champion (1984); 5× CFL All-Star (1976, 1980, 1981, 1982, 1984); 4× CFL East All-Star (1976, 1980, 1981, 1982); 3× CFL West All-Star (1983, 1984, 1985)

David Shaw (April 11, 1953 – October 3, 2024) was a football player in the Canadian Football League (CFL) for 12 years. Shaw played defensive back for the Hamilton Tiger-Cats and Winnipeg Blue Bombers from 1975 to 1986. He was a CFL All-Star five times and was a part of the Blue Bombers Grey Cup championship team in 1984. He played college football at the Prairie View A&M University.

Shaw died on October 3, 2024, at the age of 71.
