= Delbert Fowler =

American gridiron football player (born 1958)

Profile
- Position: Linebacker

Personal information
- Born: May 4, 1958 (age 68); Cleveland, Ohio, U.S.

Career information
- College: West Virginia
- NFL draft: 1981: 5th round, 133rd overall pick

Career history
- 1982–1983: Montreal Concordes
- 1984–1988: Winnipeg Blue Bombers

Awards and highlights
- 2× Grey Cup champion (1984, 1988); CFL All-Star (1983)

Delbert "Treetop" Fowler (born May 4, 1958) is an American former professional football player for the Winnipeg Blue Bombers of the Canadian Football League (CFL). Fowler was born in Cleveland, Ohio where he played high school football for Glenville High School in Cleveland, Ohio.

After high school, Fowler attended West Virginia University where he played for the Mountaineers. He played between 1977 and 1980 as a defensive end. After retiring from professional football he married Gail Jones of Pittsburgh, Pa. To this union was born one son, Delbert DeVaughn "Booter" Fowler.

Fowler was drafted out of college in the 1981 NFL draft by the Houston Oilers. He was the fifth round, twenty-second pick.
