= Dan Ferrone =

Canadian football player (born 1958)

No. 69
- Position: Guard

Personal information
- Born: April 3, 1958 (age 68); Oakville, Ontario, Canada

Career information
- High school: T. A. Blakelock
- University: Simon Fraser
- CFL draft: 1981

Career history

Playing
- 1981–1988: Toronto Argonauts
- 1989: Calgary Stampeders
- 1990–1992: Toronto Argonauts

Coaching
- 2002: Toronto Argonauts (OL coach)

Operations
- 1993–2000: CFLPA (President)
- 2003: Toronto Argonauts (VP)
- 2004: Toronto Argonauts (President)

Awards and highlights
- 2× Grey Cup champion (1983, 1991); 2× Leo Dandurand Trophy (1984, 1985); 5× CFL All-Star (1984, 1985, 1987, 1990, 1991); 8× CFL East All-Star (1983–1988, 1990, 1991); CFL West All-Star (1989); Oakville Sports Hall Of Fame (2000); All Time Argo (2006); T.A. Blakelock Wall of Fame (2006); 6× CFL Offensive Lineman of the week
- Canadian Football Hall of Fame (Class of 2013)

Dan Ferrone (born April 3, 1958) is a Canadian former professional football player. He played with the Toronto Argonauts for eight seasons, interrupted by one season with the Calgary Stampeders, in the Canadian Football League (CFL). He was an offensive lineman with the teams from 1981 to 1992, part of the Argonaut's Grey Cup championships in 1983 and 1991.

During Ferrone's time in the CFL, he was named to the CFL's All-Star team 5 times, the East Division All-Star team 8 times and one time West Division All-Star.

In 1992, his first year after retiring from the CFL, Ferrone was elected as the seventh president of the Canadian Football League Players' Association (CFLPA). He served as CFLPA president until 2000.

Ferrone was the Canadian Alliance candidate for Oakville in the 2000 Canadian federal election, coming in second to Bonnie Brown.

Following his service with the CFLPA, Ferrone coached the Toronto Argonauts offensive line in 2002, becoming the team's Vice-President in 2003 and serving as the team's President for 2004.

The multiple All-Star and Grey Cup champion was inducted to the Canadian Football Hall of Fame in September 2013.
