= CFL's Most Outstanding Defensive Player Award =

Award in the Canadian Football League

The Most Outstanding Defensive Player Award is annually awarded to the best defensive player in the Canadian football League. The winner of the award is selected by members of the Football Reporters of Canada along with the head coaches in the CFL. The two nominees for the award are the James P. McCaffrey Trophy winner from the East Division, and the Norm Fieldgate Trophy winner from the West Division. Between 1955 and 1973, both defensive players and offensive lineman had to compete for the CFL's Most Outstanding Lineman Award. By the 1974 season, the league decided to make two separate awards for both defensive players and offensive lineman.

== CFL's Most Outstanding Defensive Player Award winners ==
- 2026 – Darnell Sankey (LB), BC Lions
- 2025 – Mathieu Betts (DE), BC Lions
- 2024 – Rolan Milligan (DB), Saskatchewan Roughriders
- 2023 – Mathieu Betts (DE), BC Lions
- 2022 – Lorenzo Mauldin (DE), Ottawa Redblacks
- 2021 – Adam Bighill (LB), Winnipeg Blue Bombers
- 2020 – season cancelled – covid 19
- 2019 – Willie Jefferson (DE), Winnipeg Blue Bombers
- 2018 – Adam Bighill (LB), Winnipeg Blue Bombers
- 2017 – Alex Singleton (LB), Calgary Stampeders
- 2016 – Solomon Elimimian (LB), BC Lions
- 2015 – Adam Bighill (LB), BC Lions
- 2014 – Solomon Elimimian (LB), BC Lions
- 2013 – Chip Cox (LB), Montreal Alouettes
- 2012 – J.C. Sherritt (LB), Edmonton Eskimos
- 2011 – Jovon Johnson (DB), Winnipeg Blue Bombers
- 2010 – Markeith Knowlton (LB), Hamilton Tiger-Cats
- 2009 – John Chick (DE), Saskatchewan Roughriders
- 2008 – Cameron Wake (DE), BC Lions
- 2007 – Cameron Wake (DE), BC Lions
- 2006 – Brent Johnson (DE), BC Lions
- 2005 – John Grace (LB), Calgary Stampeders
- 2004 – Anwar Stewart (DE), Montreal Alouettes
- 2003 – Joe Fleming (DT), Calgary Stampeders
- 2002 – Elfrid Payton (DE), Edmonton Eskimos
- 2001 – Joe Montford (DE), Hamilton Tiger-Cats
- 2000 – Joe Montford (DE), Hamilton Tiger-Cats
- 1999 – Calvin Tiggle (LB), Hamilton Tiger-Cats
- 1998 – Joe Montford (DE), Hamilton Tiger-Cats
- 1997 – Willie Pless (LB), Edmonton Eskimos
- 1996 – Willie Pless (LB), Edmonton Eskimos
- 1995 – Willie Pless (LB), Edmonton Eskimos
- 1994 – Willie Pless (LB), Edmonton Eskimos
- 1993 – Jearld Baylis (DT), Saskatchewan Roughriders
- 1992 – Willie Pless (LB), Edmonton Eskimos
- 1991 – Greg Battle (LB), Winnipeg Blue Bombers
- 1990 – Greg Battle (LB), Winnipeg Blue Bombers
- 1989 – Danny Bass (LB), Edmonton Eskimos
- 1988 – Grover Covington (DE), Hamilton Tiger-Cats
- 1987 – Greg Stumon (DE), BC Lions
- 1986 – James "Quick" Parker (DE), BC Lions
- 1985 – Tyrone Jones (LB), Winnipeg Blue Bombers
- 1984 – James "Quick" Parker (DE), BC Lions
- 1983 – Greg Marshall (DE), Ottawa Rough Riders
- 1982 – James "Quick" Parker (LB), Edmonton Eskimos
- 1981 – Danny Kepley (LB), Edmonton Eskimos
- 1980 – Danny Kepley (LB), Edmonton Eskimos
- 1979 – Ben Zambiasi (LB), Hamilton Tiger-Cats
- 1978 – Dave "Dr. Death" Fennell (DT), Edmonton Eskimos
- 1977 – Danny Kepley (LB), Edmonton Eskimos
- 1976 – Bill Baker (DE), BC Lions
- 1975 – Jim Corrigall (DE), Toronto Argonauts
- 1974 – John Helton (DT), Calgary Stampeders

== See also ==
- Norm Fieldgate Trophy
- James P. McCaffrey Trophy
- CFL's Most Outstanding Lineman Award
