= 1983 CFL season =

Canadian Football League season

- East champions: Toronto Argonauts
- West champions: BC Lions

71st Grey Cup
- Date: November 27, 1983
- Champions: Toronto Argonauts

CFL seasons
- ← 1982 1984 →

Canadian Football League team locations: West, East

The 1983 CFL season is considered to be the 30th season in modern-day Canadian football, although it is officially the 26th Canadian Football League season.

== CFL news in 1983 ==
The CFL re-signed with Carling O'Keefe Breweries to another record television contract worth $33 million to cover a three-year period from 1983 to 1986.

The BC Lions opened their new stadium, BC Place this season, and with it, introduced shorter endzones to its stadium (20 yards in length as opposed to the then-standard 25 yards). This was because the floor of the stadium was too short to accommodate the 25 yard endzones; the shorter endzone length would become standard in the CFL three years later, in 1986.

The league's attendance levels reached an all-time high for all football games with 2,856,031. The Grey Cup game between the Toronto Argonauts and the BC Lions was played in front of 59,345 football fans at BC Place Stadium (the first lion gross gate).

In addition, CBC, CTV and Radio-Canada's coverage of the Grey Cup game attracted the largest viewing audience in television history for a Canadian sports program with 8,118,000.

The Toronto Argonauts won their first Grey Cup Championship since 1952. This would be the last season all three of the CFL's Ontario-based teams qualified for the playoffs until 2015.

Terry Greer set a pro football record for most receiving yards with 2,003.

== Regular season standings ==
=== Final regular season standings ===
West Division
Pos	Team	Pld	W	L	T	PF	PA	PD	Pts
1	BC Lions (C, Q)	16	11	5	0	477	326	+151	22
2	Winnipeg Blue Bombers (Q)	16	9	7	0	412	402	+10	18
3	Edmonton Eskimos (Q)	16	8	8	0	450	377	+73	16
4	Calgary Stampeders	16	8	8	0	425	378	+47	16
5	Saskatchewan Roughriders	16	5	11	0	360	536	−176	10

Source: "1983 Regular Season Standings". Archived from the original on August 8, 2008.
(C) First round bye; (Q) Qualified for playoffs

East Division
Pos	Team	Pld	W	L	T	PF	PA	PD	Pts	Div	Stk
1	Toronto Argonauts (C, Q)	16	12	4	0	452	328	124	24	4–2	W2
2	Ottawa Rough Riders (Q)	16	8	8	0	384	424	−40	16	2–4	L2
3	Hamilton Tiger-Cats (Q)	16	5	10	1	389	498	−109	11	3–2–1	T1
4	Montreal Concordes	16	5	10	1	367	447	−80	11	2–3–1	T1

Source: "1983 Regular Season Standings". Archived from the original on August 8, 2008.
(C) First round bye; (Q) Qualified for playoffs

BC and Toronto had first round byes.

== Grey Cup playoffs ==
The Toronto Argonauts are the 1983 Grey Cup champions, defeating the BC Lions, 18–17, in front of their home crowd at Vancouver's BC Place Stadium. This was Toronto's first championship in 31 years, ending the league's longest drought at that time. The Argonauts' Joe Barnes (QB) was named the Grey Cup's Most Valuable Player on Offence and Carl Brazley (DB) was named Grey Cup's Most Valuable Player on Defence. The Lions' Rick Klassen (DT) was named the Grey Cup's Most Valuable Canadian.

=== Playoff bracket ===
November 13: Division Semifinals
East
E3	Hamilton Tiger-Cats	33
E2	Ottawa Rough Riders	31
West
W3	Edmonton Eskimos	22
W2	Winnipeg Blue Bombers	49

November 20: Division Finals
E3	Hamilton Tiger-Cats	36
E1	Toronto Argonauts	41
W2	Winnipeg Blue Bombers	21
W1	BC Lions	39

November 27: 71st Grey Cup @ BC Place Stadium – Vancouver, BC
E1	Toronto Argonauts	18
W1	BC Lions	17

== CFL leaders ==
- CFL passing leaders
- CFL rushing leaders
- CFL receiving leaders

== 1983 CFL All-Stars ==
=== Offence ===
- QB – Warren Moon, Edmonton Eskimos
- RB – Alvin "Skip" Walker, Ottawa Rough Riders
- RB – Johnny Shepherd, Hamilton Tiger-Cats
- SB – Tom Scott, Edmonton Eskimos
- SB – Ron Robinson, Montreal Concordes
- WR – Brian Kelly, Edmonton Eskimos
- WR – Terry Greer, Toronto Argonauts
- C – John Bonk, Winnipeg Blue Bombers
- OG – Leo Blanchard, Edmonton Eskimos
- OG – Rudy Phillips, Ottawa Rough Riders
- OT – John Blain, BC Lions
- OT – Kevin Powell, Ottawa Rough Riders

=== Defence ===
- DT – Mack Moore, BC Lions
- DT – Gary Dulin, Ottawa Rough Riders
- DE – Greg Marshall, Ottawa Rough Riders
- DE – Rick Mohr, Toronto Argonauts
- MLB – Danny Bass, Calgary Stampeders
- LB – Delbert Fowler, Montreal Concordes
- LB – Vince Goldsmith, Saskatchewan Roughriders
- DB – Harry Skipper, Montreal Concordes
- DB – Kerry Parker, BC Lions
- DB – Larry Crawford, BC Lions
- DB – Richard Hall, Calgary Stampeders
- DB – Carl Brazley, Toronto Argonauts
- DB – Paul Bennett, Winnipeg Blue Bombers

=== Special teams ===
- P/K – Lui Passaglia, BC Lions

== 1983 Eastern All-Stars ==
=== Offence ===
- QB – Condredge Holloway, Toronto Argonauts
- RB – Alvin "Skip" Walker, Ottawa Rough Riders
- RB – Johnny Shepherd, Hamilton Tiger-Cats
- SB – Emanuel Tolbert, Toronto Argonauts
- SB – Ron Robinson, Montreal Concordes
- WR – Keith Baker, Hamilton Tiger-Cats
- WR – Terry Greer, Toronto Argonauts
- C – Larry Tittley, Ottawa Rough Riders
- OG – Dan Ferrone, Toronto Argonauts
- OG – Rudy Phillips, Ottawa Rough Riders
- OT – Miles Gorrell, Montreal Concordes
- OT – Kevin Powell, Ottawa Rough Riders

=== Defence ===
- DT – Franklin King, Toronto Argonauts
- DT – Gary Dulin, Ottawa Rough Riders
- DE – Greg Marshall, Ottawa Rough Riders
- DE – Rick Mohr, Toronto Argonauts
- MLB – Darrell Nicholson, Toronto Argonauts
- LB – Delbert Fowler, Montreal Concordes
- LB – Rick Sowieta, Ottawa Rough Riders
- LB – William Mitchell, Toronto Argonauts
- DB – Harry Skipper, Montreal Concordes
- DB – Leroy Paul, Toronto Argonauts
- DB – Howard Fields, Hamilton Tiger-Cats
- DB – Darrell Wilson, Toronto Argonauts
- DB – Carl Brazley, Toronto Argonauts
- DB – Ken McEachern, Toronto Argonauts

=== Special teams ===
- P/K – Bernie Ruoff, Hamilton Tiger-Cats

== 1983 Western All-Stars ==
=== Offence ===
- QB – Warren Moon, Edmonton Eskimos
- RB – Willard Reaves, Winnipeg Blue Bombers
- RB – Ray Crouse, Calgary Stampeders
- SB – Tom Scott, Edmonton Eskimos
- SB – Chris DeFrance, Saskatchewan Roughriders
- WR – Brian Kelly, Edmonton Eskimos
- WR – Mervyn Fernandez, BC Lions
- C – John Bonk, Winnipeg Blue Bombers
- OG – Leo Blanchard, Edmonton Eskimos
- OG – Roger Aldag, Saskatchewan Roughriders
- OT – John Blain, BC Lions
- OT – Dave Kirzinger, Calgary Stampeders

=== Defence ===
- DT – Mack Moore, BC Lions
- DT – Randy Trautman, Calgary Stampeders
- DE – James Parker, Edmonton Eskimos
- DE – Tony Norman, Winnipeg Blue Bombers
- MLB – Danny Bass, Calgary Stampeders
- LB – James West, Calgary Stampeders
- LB – Vince Goldsmith, Saskatchewan Roughriders
- DB – Dave Shaw, Winnipeg Blue Bombers
- DB – Kerry Parker, BC Lions
- DB – Larry Crawford, BC Lions
- DB – Richard Hall, Calgary Stampeders
- DB – Paul Bennett, Winnipeg Blue Bombers

=== Special teams ===
- P/K – Lui Passaglia, BC Lions
- P/K – Trevor Kennerd, Winnipeg Blue Bombers

== 1983 CFL awards ==
- CFL's Most Outstanding Player Award – Warren Moon (QB), Edmonton Eskimos
- CFL's Most Outstanding Canadian Award – Paul Bennett (DB), Winnipeg Blue Bombers
- CFL's Most Outstanding Defensive Player Award – Greg Marshall (DE), Ottawa Rough Riders
- CFL's Most Outstanding Offensive Lineman Award – Rudy Phillips (OG), Ottawa Rough Riders
- CFL's Most Outstanding Rookie Award – Johnny Shepherd (RB), Hamilton Tiger-Cats
- CFLPA's Outstanding Community Service Award – Henry Waszczuk (C), Hamilton Tiger-Cats
- CFL's Coach of the Year – Cal Murphy, Winnipeg Blue Bombers
