= Mike Gray (Canadian football) =

American gridiron football player and coach (born 1960)

Michael Gray
No. 52
- Position: Defensive tackle

Personal information
- Born: February 11, 1960 (age 66); Baltimore, Maryland, U.S.

Career information
- College: Oregon

Career history

Playing
- BC Lions (1985–1986); Winnipeg Blue Bombers (1987–1993)

Coaching
- BC Lions (1993–1994) Assistant coach; Weber State (1995) Defensive line coach; St. Louis Rams (1996–1997) Defensive line coach; Oregon State (1997–2002) Defensive line coach; Kentucky (2003–2004) Offensive line coach; Oregon (2005–2008) Defensive line coach; UNLV (2010–2014) Defensive line coach; Salt Lake Stallions (2019) Defensive line coach

Awards and highlights
- 3× Grey Cup champion (1985, 1988, 1990); Grey Cup Most Valuable Player (1988); CFL Rookie of the Year (1985); Jackie Parker Trophy (1985); CFL All-Star (1985); CFL East All-Star (1989); CFL West All-Star (1985); Winnipeg Football Club Hall of Fame (2006)

Mike Gray (born February 11, 1960) is a former award-winning and all-star Canadian Football League (CFL) defensive tackle and Grey Cup champion.

After playing his college football at the University of Oregon Gray started his pro career with the British Columbia Lions in 1985. He played 16 games and had 13 sacks, good for an all-star nod and the CFL's Most Outstanding Rookie Award. After 8 sacks in 1986, the Lions lost Gray to the Ottawa Rough Riders in the equalization draft. Ottawa released him and he began a 7-year stay with the Winnipeg Blue Bombers, playing 107 regular season games and being named an Eastern all-star in 1989.

Perhaps Gray's most famous and dramatic play came in the classic 76th Grey Cup game. Facing his old team, the B.C. Lions, Winnipeg had their backs to the wall, leading by only 3 points in the final minute of the game, with the Lions on the Bomber 7 yard line. Matt Dunigan's pass was tipped at the line of scrimmage and somehow Gray came up with the Cup-saving interception, earning him the defensive Grey Cup Most Valuable Player award.

In 1994 Gray was an assistant coach with the Lions.

In October 2018, he became the defensive line coach for the Salt Lake Stallions of the Alliance of American Football.
