= B. J. Gallis =

American football player (born 1975)

B.J. Gallis
Profile
- Position: Linebacker

Personal information
- Born: March 27, 1975 (age 51); Scranton, PA

Career information
- College: Lafayette College

Career history
- 1997–98: B.C. Lions
- 1999: Edmonton Eskimos

Awards and highlights
- Jackie Parker Trophy (1997)

B. J. Gallis is a former award-winning former football linebacker in the Canadian Football League.

A three-year starter at strong safety for Lafayette College, he finished his college career with 11 interceptions, 7 fumble recoveries, 309 tackles, 2 blocked kicks and 4 quarterback sacks, He played 33 games without missing a start. His awards include 1-AA Associated Press All-American, Patriot League Defensive Player of the Year, All Patriot League Team, 2nd Team All-ECAC and Lafayette College Hugh Stoney Jones Team MVP Award. He majored in Chemistry.

In 1997 he signed the B.C. Lions of the CFL, playing in 12 games and made 45 tackles and 4 quarterback sacks. This was good enough to win him the Jackie Parker Trophy as rookie of the year in the Western Division (and runner up for CFL rookie.) He was with the Lions in 1998, but was sidelined with an abdominal strain, and finished his career with the Edmonton Eskimos in 1999.

Gallis is currently a pharmaceutical sales representative for Pfizer.
