= Stewart Hill =

American gridiron football player (born 1962)

No. 36
- Position: Defensive end

Personal information
- Born: March 16, 1962 (age 64); Seattle, Washington, U.S.
- Listed height: 6 ft 1 in (1.85 m)
- Listed weight: 230 lb (104 kg)

Career information
- College: Washington

Career history
- 1984–1990: Edmonton Eskimos
- 1991–1992: BC Lions
- 1993: Saskatchewan Roughriders

Awards and highlights
- Grey Cup champion (1987); Grey Cup MVP (1987); Norm Fieldgate Trophy (1990); Jackie Parker Trophy (1984); 3× CFL All-Star (1984, 1989, 1990); 5× CFL West All-Star (1984, 1986, 1989, 1990, 1991); Eskimos record: most sacks – career (102)

Stewart Hill (born March 16, 1962) is an American former award-winning linebacker in the Canadian Football League. He was drafted in the second round of the 1984 Supplemental Draft by the Los Angeles Raiders.

After playing college football with the University of Washington, Hill went to Canada and signed with the Edmonton Eskimos.

He would play in Edmonton for seven seasons, and in his first season (1984) he was an all-star and Jackie Parker Trophy winner (western division rookie and CFL runner up.) He was also an all star in 1989 and 1990, and in 1990 he won the Norm Fieldgate Trophy. He moved to the B.C. Lions in 1991 and 1992, where he was a western all star in 1991. He finished his career with the Saskatchewan Roughriders in 1993. His 126 career quarterback sacks is 6th best in CFL history.
