= Willie Pless =

American gridiron football player (born 1964)

No. 32, 39
- Position: Linebacker

Personal information
- Born: February 21, 1964 (age 62); Anniston, Alabama, U.S.

Career information
- College: Kansas

Career history
- 1986–1989: Toronto Argonauts
- 1990: BC Lions
- 1991–1998: Edmonton Eskimos
- 1999: Saskatchewan Roughriders
- 2000: Edmonton Eskimos*
- * Offseason or practice squad member only

Awards and highlights
- Grey Cup champion (1993); 5× CFL Most Outstanding Defensive Player (1992, 1994–1997); 5× Norm Fieldgate Trophy (1992, 1994–1997); Frank M. Gibson Trophy (1986); 11× CFL All-Star (1986, 1988, 1990–1998); 3× CFL East All-Star (1986, 1988, 1995)(North); 9× CFL West All-Star (1990–1994, 1996-1999); Second-team All-American (1984); 3× First-team All-Big Eight (1983, 1984, 1985); Edmonton Eskimos Wall of Honour (2004); Eskimos records: Most defensive tackles – career (813); Most defensive tackles – season (117) - 1998; Most fumble returns – career (26); Most fumble returns – season (8) - 1992; Most fumble returns – game (3) - 2 times; Most tackles for losses – career (41); CFL Records: Most defensive tackles - career (1241)
- Canadian Football Hall of Fame (Class of 2005)

Willie Pless (born February 21, 1964) is an American former professional football linebacker who played in the Canadian Football League (CFL) for the Toronto Argonauts, BC Lions, Edmonton Eskimos, and Saskatchewan Roughriders. He won the 1993 Grey Cup with the Eskimos. He was inducted into the Canadian Football Hall of Fame in 2005.

== College career ==
Pless played his college football at the University of Kansas. As a Jayhawk starter for only three years (1983–1985) he amassed an amazing 633 tackles. This is not recognized as a record, as the NCAA officially counted tackles starting in 2000, but the present leader (Rod Davis) has only 526. Being 5 feet 10 inches tall, 210 pounds, Pless was not drafted by the NFL. He would later (in 1990) try out for the New Orleans Saints and Kansas City Chiefs, but otherwise, his entire 14 year, 250 game, career was played in Canada. Willie was an All Big Eight Academic first team and was elected as the all-time best linebacker in the history of Big Eight after it became the Big Twelve.

== Professional career ==
Willie Pless may be the best defensive player ever to play in the CFL. He played for 4 teams: Toronto Argonauts for 4 years (1986–1989), B.C. Lions for 1990, Edmonton Eskimos for (1991–1998) and finally the Saskatchewan Roughriders (1999). He holds the league record for most tackles (1,241). He also had 84 quarterback sacks, 39 interceptions, 39 fumble recoveries, played in 18 playoff games and three Grey Cups, winning one championship (the 81st Grey Cup game). He won the CFL's Most Outstanding Defensive Player Award five times and was an all star 11 times.

== Honours and awards ==
- CFL outstanding defensive player: 1992, 1994, 1995, 1996, 1997
- West Division outstanding defensive player: 1992, 1994, 1995, 1996, 1997
- East Division outstanding rookie: 1986
- CFL All-Star: 1986, 1988, 1990, 1991, 1992, 1993, 1994, 1995, 1996, 1997, 1998.
- West Division All-Star: 1994, 1996, 1997, 1998, 1999
- North Division All-Star: 1995
- B.C. Lions outstanding player: 1990
- Edmonton Eskimos outstanding player: 1993, 1994, 1995, 1996
- Toronto Argonauts outstanding defensive player: 1986, 1988
- B.C. Lions outstanding defensive player: 1990
- Edmonton Eskimos outstanding defensive player: 1991, 1992, 1993, 1994, 1995, 1996, 1997
- Saskatchewan Roughriders outstanding defensive player: 1999
- Toronto Argonauts outstanding rookie: 1986
- Grey Cup participation: 1987, 1993, 1996
- Grey Cup victories: 1993

He is a member of the University of Kansas Sports Hall of Fame and was inducted into the Canadian Football Hall of Fame in 2005. In November, 2006, Willie Pless was voted one of the CFL's Top 50 players (#16) of the league's modern era by Canadian sports network The Sports Network/TSN.

== Personal life ==
Pless has settled in Edmonton and runs a personal trainer business.
