= Gary Schreider =

Canadian football player (1934–2011)

Profile
- Position: Halfback

Personal information
- Born: April 21, 1934; Belleville, Ontario, Canada
- Died: January 22, 2011 (aged 76); Ottawa, Ontario, Canada
- Listed height: 5 ft 10 in (1.78 m)
- Listed weight: 185 lb (84 kg)

Career information
- College: Queen's

Career history

Playing
- 1956–1961: Ottawa Rough Riders
- 1962: BC Lions
- 1962: Hamilton Tiger-Cats
- 1963–1964: Ottawa Rough Riders

Operations
- 1965–1970: CFLPA (President)

Awards and highlights
- Yates Cup champion (1955); Grey Cup champion (1960)

Gary Edward Schreider (April 21, 1934 – January 22, 2011) was a Canadian professional football player who played for the Hamilton Tiger-Cats, Ottawa Rough Riders and BC Lions. He won the Grey Cup with Ottawa in 1960. He played university football at Queen's University, where he was part of the Golden Gaels' 1955 Yates Cup championship.

During the 1965 off-season, Schreider became a founding member, and first president, of the Canadian Football League Players' Association. He did not return to the CFL for the 1965 season, going on to a career as a lawyer and judge.

Schreider has been inducted into the Queen's University Hall of Fame and the Ottawa Sports Hall of Fame.

Schreider died in 2011 of pneumonia and Alzheimer's disease.
