= Ron Johnson (quarterback) =

American football player

Ronnie Johnson
Profile
- Position: Quarterback

Personal information
- Born: c. 1947 (age 78–79); Clarksville, Tennessee, U.S.
- Listed height: 6 ft 1 in (1.85 m)
- Listed weight: 190 lb (86 kg)

Career information
- College: Oklahoma State

Career history
- 1969–1970: Winnipeg Blue Bombers

Ronnie Johnson (born c. 1947) was an American professional football player who played for the Winnipeg Blue Bombers. He played college football at Oklahoma State University–Stillwater.
