= Rick Mohr =

American football player (1959–2021)

Richard Alan Mohr Jr. (July 27, 1959 – June 6, 2021) was a Canadian football defensive lineman in the Canadian Football League (CFL) who played for the Toronto Argonauts and Saskatchewan Roughriders. He played college football for the UC Davis Aggies from 1977 to 1980. After college, he signed as a free agent with the Green Bay Packers. He also played in the USFL for the Oakland Invaders and Tampa Bay Bandits.

Mohr died on June 6, 2021, after a heart attack while golfing at the Quail Lodge & Golf Club in Carmel, California, at the age of 61.
