= Nick Arakgi =

Canadian football star receiver

No. 79
- Position: Tight end

Personal information
- Born: August 9, 1955 (age 71); Cairo, Egypt

Career information
- University: Bishop's

Career history
- 1979–1981: Montreal Alouettes
- 1982–1985: Montreal Concordes
- 1987: Winnipeg Blue Bombers

Awards and highlights
- CFL's Most Outstanding Canadian Award (1984); Tom Pate Memorial Award (1987); 3× CFL All-Star (1982, 1984, 1985)

Nick Arakgi (born August 9, 1955) is a former professional Canadian football star receiver in the Canadian Football League. In a nine-season career, Arakgi played for the Montreal Alouettes, Montreal Concordes, and Winnipeg Blue Bombers and made three All-Star teams.

== Early life ==
Arakgi was born in Cairo, Egypt and graduated from Bishop's University in Sherbrooke, Quebec in 1978, where he played CIS football for the Bishop's Gaiters. In 1978, he was selected as the Gaiters' Most Valuable Player as well as receiving the Sid Hart Trophy as the top Male Athlete of the Year at Bishop's. He was inducted into the Bishop's University Wall of Distinction in 2004.

== Professional career ==
He began a 7-year career with the Montreal Alouettes (and the Montreal Concordes) in 1979, playing a total of 110 regular season games and the 67th Grey Cup game. He caught 327 passes in Montreal, with 89 of those coming in 1982. He was an all star in 1982, 1984, and 1985, and added the CFL's Most Outstanding Canadian Award in the 1984 CFL season.

He suffered a broken neck bone in the 1986 preseason and did not play that year, but returned for the 1987 CFL season to play for the Winnipeg Blue Bombers, catching 43 more passes and winning the Tom Pate Memorial Award in recognition of his comeback.

Arakgi finished his football career with 370 receptions, 27 touchdowns, and 4,865 receiving yards.

== After football ==
As of 2008, he was a general manager with CBS Outdoor Advertising, and served on the Board of Directors for the Out of Home Marketing Association. He resides in Toronto, Ontario.

Arakgi has five children (one of whom, Jason Arakgi, played for the BC Lions).
