= Ken Hailey =

American gridiron football player (born 1961)

No. 24
- Position: Defensive back

Personal information
- Born: July 12, 1961 (age 65); Oceanside, California, U.S.

Career information
- College: San Francisco State

Career history
- 1983–1991: Winnipeg Blue Bombers
- 1992: Ottawa Rough Riders
- 1993: British Columbia Lions

Awards and highlights
- 3× Grey Cup champion (1984, 1988, 1990); 3× CFL All-Star (1984, 1985, 1987)

Ken Hailey (born July 12, 1961) is a former defensive back who played eleven seasons in the Canadian Football League (CFL) for three teams.
