= Solomon Elimimian =

Nigerian gridiron football player (born 1986)

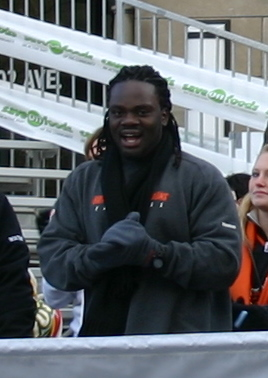
- Elimimian walking in a Grey Cup parade in 2011

No. 56, 10
- Position: Linebacker

Personal information
- Born: October 21, 1986 (age 40); Calabar, Nigeria
- Listed height: 6 ft 0 in (1.83 m)
- Listed weight: 225 lb (102 kg)

Career information
- High school: Crenshaw (Los Angeles, California, U.S.)
- College: Hawaii
- NFL draft: 2009: undrafted

Career history
- 2009: Buffalo Bills*
- 2010–2011: BC Lions
- 2012: Minnesota Vikings*
- 2012: Cleveland Browns*
- 2012–2018: BC Lions
- 2019–2020: Saskatchewan Roughriders
- * Offseason or practice squad member only

Awards and highlights
- Grey Cup champion (2011); CFL's Most Outstanding Player Award (2014); 2× CFL's Most Outstanding Defensive Player Award (2014, 2016); 2× Norm Fieldgate Trophy (2014, 2016); Jeff Nicklin Memorial Trophy (2014); CFL's Most Outstanding Rookie Award (2010); Jackie Parker Trophy (2010); 4× CFL All-Star (2011, 2014, 2016, 2017); 6× CFL West All-Star (2011, 2013, 2014, 2016, 2017, 2019); BC Wall of Fame; BC Lions No. 56 retired; WAC Defensive Player of the Year (2008)
- Stats at Pro Football Reference
- Stats at CFL.ca
- Canadian Football Hall of Fame (Class of 2023)

Solomon Elimimian (born October 21, 1986) is a Nigerian former professional Canadian football linebacker and the current president of the Canadian Football League Players' Association (CFLPA).

He spent nine seasons with the BC Lions and was named the CFL's Most Outstanding Rookie in 2010. In 2014, he won the CFL's Most Outstanding Defensive Player Award and Most Outstanding Player Award. Elimimian was the first purely defensive player to win the league's Most Outstanding Player Award as well as the first player to win three different CFL awards in his career. He played college football for the Hawaii Warriors.

== Early life ==
Elimimian started playing football in the ninth grade at Crenshaw High School in South Los Angeles, California.

== College career ==
In his senior year with the Hawaii Warriors, Elimimian recorded 121 tackles and four sacks. By the end of his four years playing for the Warriors, Elimimian held the school's all-time tackles record with 434 tackles.

== Professional career ==
=== Buffalo Bills ===
After going undrafted in the 2009 NFL draft, Elimimian was signed by the Buffalo Bills of the National Football League on August 19, 2009. He played in two preseason games before being released on September 1, 2009.

=== BC Lions ===
Elimimian signed as a free agent with the BC Lions of the Canadian Football League (CFL) on May 19, 2010. Elimimian recorded 77 tackles, five sacks and 11 special teams tackles in only 16 games. For his impressive efforts, he finished the year by winning the CFL's Most Outstanding Rookie Award for the 2010 CFL season. In the 2011 season Elimimian was voted as the leagues 'hardest hitter' according to a TSN annual Player Poll, voted on by more than 250 CFL players. Elimimian finished the 2011 season with 98 tackles, 4 sacks and 2 interceptions. He went on with the Lions to capture the 99th Grey Cup.

=== Minnesota Vikings ===
Following two outstanding years in the CFL, Elimimian decided to sign a two-year contract with the Minnesota Vikings of the NFL on January 31, 2012. On August 25, 2012, he was released by the Vikings.

=== Cleveland Browns ===
Elimimian was signed to the Cleveland Browns practice squad on September 1, 2012. He was waived from the practice squad on September 3, 2012.

=== BC Lions ===
Elimimian returned to the BC Lions partway through the 2012 CFL season. He only played in 6 CFL games that season, tallying only 12 tackles. Elimimian re-signed with the Lions hours after the opening of free agency on February 15, 2013. Elimimian earned Defensive player of the Week honors for Week 6 after registering a forced fumble and an interception in the Lions win over the Blue Bombers on August 5, 2013. He finished the 2013 season with 73 tackles, 3 sacks and 3 interceptions. Elimimian had a record-setting 2014 CFL season, setting a new CFL record for most tackles in a season with 143 (he was 54 tackles ahead of Bear Woods who finished in second place that season). In addition to setting the tackle record, Elimimian had 5 sacks, 1 interception and 3 fumble recoveries. He won the 2014 CFL Most Outstanding Defensive Player Award and Most Outstanding Player Award. He is the first purely defensive player to win the league's Most Outstanding Player Award as well as the first player to win three different CFL awards in his career. Just as the 2015 free agency period opened, the BC Lions announced a contract extension for Elimimian. The deal is reportedly worth $700,000 over three seasons. Elimimian played in the first 7 games of the 2015 CFL season after suffering a season-ending Achilles injury in mid-August. He finished the season with 44 tackles, 2 sacks and 1 interception.

In Week 11 of the 2016 season Elimimian broke the Lions single game tackles record against the Argonauts when he made 14 tackles. For the second time in his career Solomon Elimimian lead the league in tackles when he finished the 2016 season with 129. His accomplishments on the field were recognized when he was named the league's Most Outstanding Defensive Player for the second time in his career. Set to become a free agent in February 2017, Elimimian and the Lions agreed to a two-year contract extension on December 21, 2016. Elimimian had a career year in the 2017 season, surpassing his previous CFL record of 143 tackles in a season by one, raising the record to 144. Elimimian was named the Lions' Most Outstanding Player and Most Outstanding Defensive Player.

Elimimian played in the first four games of the 2018 season, registering 26 tackles. On July 18, 2018 it was announced that Elimimian could miss up to eight weeks after undergoing wrist surgery. In early September Head Coach Wally Buono revealed that Elimimian would likely miss another four-to-five weeks as he recovered from his wrist surgery. Elimimian was finally taken off injured reserve on November 6, 2018, prior to the Lions' Eastern Semi-Final playoff game against the Hamilton Tiger-Cats. Following a number of high-profile free agent signings, headlined by star quarterback Mike Reilly, rumours began to circulate in late April that the BC Lions were planning to release Elimimian after failing to find a viable trade partner. He was officially released on April 30, 2019. Elimimian left the Lions as the team's all-time leader in tackles with 745, having played in 118 games for the Lions. The release came well after the CFL free agency period had passes, leading Elimimian's agent to criticize Ed Hervey for the timing; Elimimian had already agreed to pay cuts in consecutive years so that he could remain with the Lions, and with his release this late, Elimimian's next contract would not be as high given that most team's had already committed resources for the season. Hervey doubled down on his reasons for releasing Elimimian; "We know when a players’ time is up and that's the decision that we made."

=== Saskatchewan Roughriders ===
On May 9, 2019, the Saskatchewan Roughriders signed Elimimian to a contract. Elimimian missed the first three games, but proved himself effective by finishing third in defensive tackles with 88, which was good for first in the Western Division, for which he was named a divisional All-Star. He also forced a fumble, and had four sacks; in three wins against Hervey's BC Lions, Elimimian had one sack in each of them. Elimimian helped lead the Roughriders to first place in the West Division for the first time in a decade. He retired from professional football on February 9, 2021.

Elimimian was announced as a member of the Canadian Football Hall of Fame 2023 class on March 16, 2023, in his first year of eligibility.

In 2025, the Lions inducted Elimimian into the team's Wall of Fame and retired his jersey number of 56.

== Canadian Football League Players' Association ==
On February 7, 2020, Elimimian was elected President of the Canadian Football League Players' Association, beating out three other candidates. He succeeded Jeff Keeping who did not seek a second term.
