= CFL's Most Outstanding Rookie Award =

Honor awarded to Canadian football players

The Most Outstanding Rookie Award is annually awarded to the player judged to be the best player in his first year in the Canadian Football League. The two nominees for the award are the Frank M. Gibson Trophy winner from the East Division, and the Jackie Parker Trophy winner from the West Division.

== CFL's Most Outstanding Rookie Award winners ==
- 1972 – Chuck Ealey (QB), Hamilton Tiger-Cats
- 1973 – Johnny Rodgers (WR), Montreal Alouettes
- 1974 – Sam Cvijanovich (LB), Toronto Argonauts
- 1975 – Tom Clements (QB), Ottawa Rough Riders
- 1976 – John Sciarra (QB), BC Lions
- 1977 – Leon Bright (WR), BC Lions
- 1978 – Joe Poplawski (WR), Winnipeg Blue Bombers
- 1979 – Brian Kelly (WR), Edmonton Eskimos
- 1980 – William Miller (RB), Winnipeg Blue Bombers
- 1981 – Vince Goldsmith (LB), Saskatchewan Roughriders
- 1982 – Chris Isaac (QB), Ottawa Rough Riders
- 1983 – Johnny Shepherd (RB), Hamilton Tiger-Cats
- 1984 – Dwaine Wilson (RB), Montreal Concordes
- 1985 – Mike Gray (DT), BC Lions
- 1986 – Harold Hallman (DT), Calgary Stampeders
- 1987 – Gil Fenerty (RB), Toronto Argonauts
- 1988 – Orville Lee (RB), Ottawa Rough Riders
- 1989 – Stephen Jordan (DB), Hamilton Tiger-Cats
- 1990 – Reggie Barnes (RB), Ottawa Rough Riders
- 1991 – Jon Volpe (RB), BC Lions
- 1992 – Mike Richardson (RB), Winnipeg Blue Bombers
- 1993 – Mike O'Shea (LB), Hamilton Tiger-Cats
- 1994 – Matt Goodwin (DB), Baltimore CFLers
- 1995 – Shalon Baker (WR), Edmonton Eskimos
- 1996 – Kelvin Anderson (RB), Calgary Stampeders
- 1997 – Derrell Mitchell (SB), Toronto Argonauts
- 1998 – Steve Muhammad (DB), BC Lions
- 1999 – Paul Lacoste (LB), BC Lions
- 2000 – Albert Johnson III (WR), Winnipeg Blue Bombers
- 2001 – Barrin Simpson (LB), BC Lions
- 2002 – Jason Clermont (SB), BC Lions
- 2003 – Frank Cutolo (WR), BC Lions
- 2004 – Nikolas Lewis (WR), Calgary Stampeders
- 2005 – Gavin Walls (DE), Winnipeg Blue Bombers
- 2006 – Aaron Hunt (DT), BC Lions
- 2007 – Cameron Wake (DE), BC Lions
- 2008 – Weston Dressler (SB), Saskatchewan Roughriders
- 2009 – Martell Mallett (RB), BC Lions
- 2010 – Solomon Elimimian (LB), BC Lions
- 2011 – Chris Williams (WR), Hamilton Tiger-Cats
- 2012 – Chris Matthews (WR), Winnipeg Blue Bombers
- 2013 – Brett Jones (OL), Calgary Stampeders
- 2014 – Dexter McCoil (LB), Edmonton Eskimos
- 2015 – Derel Walker (WR), Edmonton Eskimos
- 2016 – DaVaris Daniels (WR), Calgary Stampeders
- 2017 – James Wilder Jr. (RB), Toronto Argonauts
- 2018 – Lewis Ward (K), Ottawa Redblacks
- 2019 – Nate Holley (LB), Calgary Stampeders
- 2020 – Season cancelled due to the COVID-19 pandemic
- 2021 – Jordan Williams (LB), BC Lions
- 2022 – Dalton Schoen (WR), Winnipeg Blue Bombers
- 2023 – Qwan'tez Stiggers (DB), Toronto Argonauts
- 2024 – Nick Anderson (LB), Edmonton Elks
- 2025 – Trey Vaval (KR/DB), Winnipeg Blue Bombers
- 2026 – Tyler Kahmann (WR), Toronto Argonauts

== See also ==
- Frank M. Gibson Trophy
- Jackie Parker Trophy
