= Tyrone Jones =

American gridiron football player (1961–2008)

No. 35, 69
- Position: Linebacker

Personal information
- Born: August 3, 1961; St. Mary's, Georgia, U.S.
- Died: June 10, 2008 (aged 46); Brunswick, Georgia, U.S.

Career information
- College: Southern University

Career history
- 1983–1987: Winnipeg Blue Bombers
- 1988: Phoenix Cardinals
- 1989–1991: Winnipeg Blue Bombers
- 1992: Saskatchewan Roughriders
- 1993: British Columbia Lions

Awards and highlights
- 2× Grey Cup champion (1984, 1990); Grey Cup Most Valuable Player (1984); CFL's Most Outstanding Defensive Player Award (1985); Norm Fieldgate Trophy (1985); 4× CFL All-Star (1984, 1985, 1986, 1987)
- Stats at Pro Football Reference
- Canadian Football Hall of Fame (Class of 2012)

Tyrone Jones (August 3, 1961 – June 10, 2008) was a gridiron football all-star and Grey Cup champion linebacker in the Canadian Football League.

Born in St. Mary's, Georgia, Ty's football career began at Camden County High School, Camden County, Georgia. Jones played his college football at Southern University. He started his 9-year CFL career in 1983, eventually playing eight seasons with the Winnipeg Blue Bombers (1983–1987, 1989–1991), one with the Saskatchewan Roughriders (1992) and one with the B.C. Lions (1993). Though not drafted by the NFL, he tried out with the Phoenix Cardinals in 1988, playing one game for them.

He was a four-time CFL and five-time division All-Star. He still holds the Winnipeg career sack record (98) along with Grey Cup records for most sacks in a game (four) and most career Grey Cup sacks (five). He won the CFL's Most Outstanding Defensive Player Award in 1985 and was on winning Grey Cup teams in 1984 and 1990 (winning the Grey Cup Most Valuable Player in 1984).

Jones was diagnosed with inoperable brain cancer (a teratoma) in August 2005 and fought the disease for nearly three years, dying on June 10, 2008, at the age of 46. His teratoma was discovered when he blew a tooth from his tumor out of his nose. Jones had three sons.

In 2012, he was inducted into the Canadian Football Hall of Fame.
