= Ben Zambiasi =

American gridiron football player (born 1956)

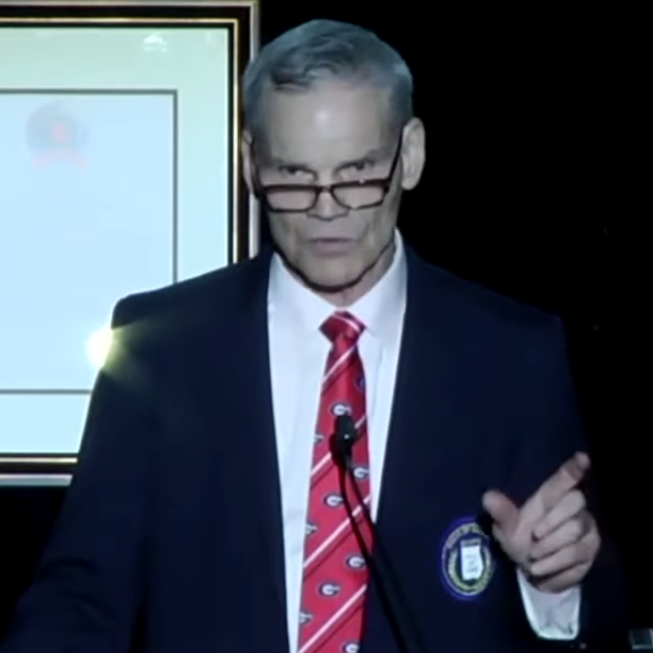
- Zambiasi in 2019

No. 31
- Position: Linebacker

Personal information
- Born: September 19, 1956 (age 70); Valdosta, Georgia, U.S.

Career information
- College: Georgia
- NFL draft: 1978: 10th round, 271st overall pick

Career history
- 1978–1987: Hamilton Tiger-Cats
- 1988: Toronto Argonauts

Awards and highlights
- Grey Cup champion (1986); CFL's Most Outstanding Defensive Player Award (1979); 2× James P. McCaffrey Trophy (1979, 1981); Frank M. Gibson Trophy (1978); 6× CFL All-Star (1978–1982, 1985); 8× CFL East All-Star (1978-1982, 1984-1986); 2× First-team All-SEC (1976, 1977); Second-team All-SEC (1975)

Career CFL statistics
- Sacks: 26
- Interceptions: 25
- Fumble recoveries: 19
- Defensive touchdowns: 4
- Canadian Football Hall of Fame (Class of 2004)

Benjamin Ray Zambiasi (born August 19, 1956) is a former linebacker for the University of Georgia and in the Canadian Football League (CFL).

Zambiasi was born in Valdosta, Georgia, and attended high school at Mount de Sales Academy in Macon playing on three state championship football teams there. He played for the Georgia Bulldogs from 1974 to 1977. While at Georgia Zambiasi led the Bulldogs with 467 career tackles tackling 173 in 1977. He later graduated from the University of Georgia in 1980 with a Bachelor of Arts (A.B.) degree. He was drafted by the NFL's Chicago Bears in the 10th round, 271st overall, in 1978, but ended up coming to Canada after training camp.

Zambiasi played 10 years with the Hamilton Tiger-Cats (1978–1987) and one year with the Toronto Argonauts (1988). He played in 4 Grey Cup games winning one championship in the 74th Grey Cup. He won the CFL's Most Outstanding Defensive Player Award in 1979 and was an all star 8 times. He was selected to the University of Georgia Bulldogs' Team of the Century and the Hamilton Tiger-Cats Wall of Honour in 2002. He was inducted into the Canadian Football Hall of Fame in 2004, the Georgia-Florida game Hall of Fame in 2014, the Georgia Sports Hall of Fame in 2019 and the Georgia High School Football Hall of Fame in 2024.
