= James "Quick" Parker =

American gridiron football player (1958–2018)

No. 40
- Positions: Defensive end, Linebacker

Personal information
- Born: January 1, 1958; Philadelphia, Pennsylvania, U.S.
- Died: March 27, 2018 (aged 60); Langley, British Columbia, Canada

Career information
- College: Wake Forest

Career history
- 1980–1983: Edmonton Eskimos
- 1984–1989: BC Lions
- 1990–1991: Toronto Argonauts

Awards and highlights
- 4× Grey Cup champion (1980, 1981, 1982, 1985); Grey Cup MVP (1985); 3× CFL's Most Outstanding Defensive Player Award (1982, 1984, 1986); 3× Norm Fieldgate Trophy (1982, 1984, 1986); 5× CFL All-Star (1981, 1982, 1984–1986); 6× CFL West All-Star (1981–1986); First-team All-ACC (1979); Eskimos record: Most sacks – season (18.5) - 1981
- Canadian Football Hall of Fame (Class of 2001)

James "Quick" Parker (January 1, 1958 – March 27, 2018) was an American professional football player who was a leading defensive player in the Canadian Football League (CFL). He was born in Philadelphia, Pennsylvania.

After attending Wake Forest University from 1976 to 1979, where he was a conference all star and second in all-time career sacks with 15, Parker joined the Edmonton Eskimos in 1980, right in the middle of the greatest dynasty in CFL history. He played with them for 4 years, until 1983, when he moved to the BC Lions for six seasons (from 1984 to 1989) and finished his 12-year career with the Toronto Argonauts (1990 to 1991).

Though small, Parker was famed for his quick burst off the line of scrimmage. He won the CFL's Most Outstanding Defensive Player Award three times (1982, 1984, 1986) and was an all star six times. He played in five Grey Cup games, winning four championships. During 1984 season, his first with the BC Lions, he had 26.5 sacks in a single season which is still a CFL record. Parker has the fourth-highest number of regular season quarterback sacks in CFL history, with 139.5.

Parker was inducted into the Wake Forest University's Sports Hall of Fame in 1997 and the Canadian Football Hall of Fame in 2001. In November 2006, he was voted one of the CFL's Top 50 players (#21) of the league's modern era by Canadian sports network The Sports Network/TSN. Parker died on March 27, 2018, at age 60.

== Awards and honours ==
- CFL All Star Team - 1981, 1982, 1984, 1985, 1986
- Western All Star (Outside Linebacker, Defensive End) - 1981, 1982, 1983, 1984, 1985, 1986
- Schenley Most Outstanding Defensive Player - 1982, 1984, 1986
- Grey Cup Defensive Player of the Game - 1985
- Norm Fieldgate Trophy (Most Outstanding Defensive Player in the Western Division) - 1982, 1984, 1986
- Grey Cups played in - 1980, 1981, 1982, 1985, 1988
- Grey Cup championships - 1980, 1981, 1982, 1985
