= William Mitchell (Canadian football) =

Canadian football player (born 1959)

Profile
- Position: Linebacker

Personal information
- Born: August 2, 1959 (age 67); Los Angeles, California, U.S.
- Listed height: 6 ft 0 in (1.83 m)
- Listed weight: 215 lb (98 kg)

Career information
- College: Long Beach State

Career history
- 1981-1982: Ottawa Rough Riders
- 1983-1985: Toronto Argonauts
- 1986: Montreal Alouettes
- 1987: Edmonton Eskimos

Awards and highlights
- Grey Cup champion (1983)

William Mitchell (born August 2, 1959) is a Canadian football player who played professionally for the Ottawa Rough Riders, Toronto Argonauts, Montreal Alouettes, and Edmonton Eskimos.
