= 72nd Grey Cup =

1984 Canadian Football championship game

Winnipeg Blue Bombers	Hamilton Tiger-Cats
(11–4–1)	(6–9–1)
47	17
Head coach: Cal Murphy	Head coach: Al Bruno
	1	2	3	4	Total
Winnipeg Blue Bombers	3	27	3	14	47
Hamilton Tiger-Cats	14	3	0	0	17
- Date: November 18, 1984
- Stadium: Commonwealth Stadium
- Location: Edmonton
- Most Valuable Player: Offence: Tom Clements, QB (Blue Bombers); Defence: Tyrone Jones, LB (Blue Bombers)
- Most Valuable Canadian: Sean Kehoe, RB (Blue Bombers)
- National anthem: Garth Hampson
- Referee: Ross Perrier
- Halftime show: The Nylons
- Attendance: 60,081

Broadcasters
- Network: CBC, CTV, SRC
- Announcers: CBC: Don Wittman, Ron Lancaster, Brian Williams, Ernie Afaganis; CTV: Pat Marsden, Frank Rigney, Leif Pettersen, Al McCann

The 72nd Grey Cup was the 1984 Canadian Football League championship game, played November 18, 1984 at Commonwealth Stadium in Edmonton between the Winnipeg Blue Bombers and the Hamilton Tiger-Cats. The Blue Bombers dominated the Tiger-Cats in a 47–17 victory.

== Game summary ==
Winnipeg Blue Bombers (47) - TDs, Willard Reaves (2), Joe Poplawski, Stan Mikawos, Jeff Boyd; FGs, Trevor Kennerd (4); cons., Kennerd (5).

Hamilton Tiger-Cats (17) - TDs, Dieter Brock, Rocky DiPietro; FGs, Bernie Ruoff; cons., Ruoff (2).

Most experts believed the contest was a mismatch, with the Blue Bombers heavily favoured. They turned out to be correct, but not before the Hamilton Tiger-Cats stunned the Bombers by jumping out to an early 17–3 lead. Winnipeg quarterback Tom Clements was ineffective in the opening 15 minutes, getting picked off twice by Felix Wright and Mark Streeter. Both interceptions led to Hamilton scores. Former Bomber pivot Dieter Brock scored on a 15-yard scamper, and completed a seven-yard pass to Rocky DiPietro for the other major.

But the Winnipeg Blue Bombers would soon dominate and take over the game. Their initial points came on a 25-yard field goal by Trevor Kennerd to close out the opening quarter. In the second quarter, after Bernie Ruoff booted a 20-yard field goal to give the Ticats a 17–3 lead, the Bombers responded with a 27-point explosion to close out the half.

Clements, who played the entire contest with a rib injury, improved as the game wore on, completing a 12-yard touchdown pass to Joe Poplawski to give Winnipeg the lead for good.

The turning point came at 2:26 before halftime, when Brock was levelled by Winnipeg linebacker Tyrone Jones. The ball was jarred loose and nose tackle Stan Mikawos recovered the fumble and ran 22 yards for a touchdown. This put the Bombers in front 27–17.

Willard Reaves, the CFL Most Outstanding Player, scored a pair of touchdowns on three-yard carries. His action was limited due to an injured shoulder, but he did rush for 64 yards. Bomber cornerback David Shaw intercepted a Brock pass in the second quarter, returning the ball 26 yards to the Hamilton 28 to help set up one of Reaves' TD runs.

Winnipeg's backup quarterback John Hufnagel tossed a four-yard touchdown pass to Jeff Boyd in the fourth quarter to complete the scoring.

== Trivia ==
- Winnipeg scored the final 44 points of the game.
- The game featured two all-star quarterbacks, Brock and Clements, (winners of the CFL's Most Outstanding Player Award), who had been traded for each other late in the previous season.
- The 1984 game, the first Grey Cup held in Edmonton, Alberta, was played in chilly −10 °C (14 °F) weather.
- Winnipeg's 27 second-quarter points was a new Grey Cup record for most points in a quarter. However, the Blue Bombers would break their own record in the 1990 Grey Cup by scoring 28 in the third quarter of that contest.
- The win was the first Grey Cup victory for the Bombers since 1962, and their last Grey Cup title and appearance as a West Division team until 2019 (also against Hamilton). During the period between 1987 and 2013, the Blue Bombers made seven Grey Cup appearances and won two titles as an East Division team. They were also the first non-Edmonton Eskimo Western Division team to win the Grey Cup since the Calgary Stampeders won it in 1971.
- 1984 marked the first Grey Cup played on natural grass since the 1970 game at Toronto's CNE Stadium. Since then, there have been three Grey Cup games played on natural grass: at Commonwealth Stadium in 1997 and 2002 (it switched to FieldTurf in 2010), and Toronto's BMO Field in 2016.

== 1984 CFL Playoffs ==
=== West Division ===
- Semi-final (November 4 @ Winnipeg, Manitoba) Winnipeg Blue Bombers 55–20 Edmonton Eskimos
- Final (November 11 @ Vancouver, British Columbia) Winnipeg Blue Bombers 31–14 BC Lions

=== East Division ===
- Semi-final (November 4 @ Hamilton, Ontario) Hamilton Tiger-Cats 17–11 Montreal Concordes
- Final (November 11 @ Toronto, Ontario) Hamilton Tiger-Cats 14–13 Toronto Argonauts OT
