= 1984 Toronto Argonauts season =

CFL team season

- Head coach: Bob O'Billovich
- Home stadium: Exhibition Stadium

Results
- Record: 9–6–1
- Division place: 1st, East
- Playoffs: Lost East Final

Uniform

The 1984 Toronto Argonauts finished in first place in the East Division with a 9–6–1 record. They appeared in the East Final.

== Offseason ==
The Toronto Argonauts drafted the following players in the 1984 CFL draft.

Round	Pick	Player	Position	School
T	T	Sterling Hinds	RB	Washington
2	17	Dave Lovegrove	DB	Wilfrid Laurier
5	44	David Pearson	SB	Toronto
6	53	Mike Joyce	SB	York
7	62	Adam Papadakos	TE	Toronto
8	71	Neil Fraser	DE	York

== Regular season ==
=== Standings ===
East Division
Pos	Team	Pld	W	L	T	PF	PA	PD	Pts	Div	Stk
1	Toronto Argonauts (C, Q)	16	9	6	1	461	361	100	19	5–1	L1
2	Hamilton Tiger-Cats (Q)	16	6	9	1	353	439	−86	13	4–2	W3
3	Montreal Concordes (Q)	16	6	9	1	386	404	−18	13	1–5	W1
4	Ottawa Rough Riders	16	4	12	0	354	507	−153	8	2–4	L1

Source: "CFL.ca - Official Site of the Canadian Football League". Archived from the original on 2009-10-20.
(C) First round bye; (Q) Qualified for playoffs

=== Schedule ===
Week	Game	Date	Opponent	Results		Venue	Attendance
Week	Game	Date	Opponent	Score	Record	Venue	Attendance
1	1	July 1	at Saskatchewan Roughriders	W 25–10	1–0	Taylor Field	23,381
2	2	July 8	at Winnipeg Blue Bombers	L 26–28	1–1	Winnipeg Stadium	25,235
3	3	July 15	vs. BC Lions	L 29–39	1–2	Exhibition Stadium	34,092
4	4	July 22	vs. Edmonton Eskimos	W 43–26	2–2	Exhibition Stadium	31,132
5	5	July 27	at Calgary Stampeders	W 43–17	3–2	McMahon Stadium	23,761
6	6	Aug 5	vs. Ottawa Rough Riders	W 49–14	4–2	Exhibition Stadium	33,077
7	7	Aug 12	at Hamilton Tiger-Cats	W 30–22	5–2	Ivor Wynne Stadium	22,201
8	Bye						
9	8	Aug 26	vs. Montreal Concordes	W 29–23	6–2	Exhibition Stadium	35,319
10	9	Aug 31	at Ottawa Rough Riders	W 23–20	7–2	Lansdowne Park	25,708
11	10	Sept 8	at Edmonton Eskimos	L 33–34	7–3	Commonwealth Stadium	39,517
12	11	Sept 16	vs. Saskatchewan Roughriders	L 18–21	7–4	Exhibition Stadium	30,025
13	Bye						
14	12	Sept 30	vs. Winnipeg Blue Bombers	W 31–19	8–4	Exhibition Stadium	35,401
15	14	Oct 6	at BC Lions	T 21–21	8–4–1	BC Place	49,258
16	14	Oct 14	vs. Calgary Stampeders	L 24–28	8–5–1	Exhibition Stadium	30,406
17	15	Oct 21	at Montreal Concordes	W 17–14	9–5–1	Olympic Stadium	19,652
18	16	Oct 27	vs. Hamilton Tiger-Cats	L 20–25	9–6–1	Exhibition Stadium	32,578

== Postseason ==
Round	Date	Opponent	Results		Venue	Attendance
Round	Date	Opponent	Score	Record	Venue	Attendance
East Final	Sat, Nov 11	vs. Hamilton Tiger-Cats	L 13–14 (OT)	0–1	Exhibition Stadium	48,414

== Roster ==
1984 Toronto Argonauts final roster
Quarterbacks: 17 Joe Barnes; 7 Condredge Holloway; 11 Ricky Turner; Running backs: 24 Walt Bender; 34 Bob Bronk; 21 Lester Brown; 33 Rob Forbes; 23 Sterling Hinds; Receivers: 27 Jan Carinci; 9 Steve Cox; 10 Terry Greer; 71 Greg Holmes; 25 Paul Pearson; 19 Emanuel Tolbert; 30 Geoff Townsend	Offensive linemen: 54 Tony Antunovic G/C; 56 Ian Beckstead C/T; 69 Dan Ferrone G; 44 Mike Hameluck C/G; 50 Tim Hook T; 63 John Malinosky T; 66 Kelvin Pruenster T; Defensive linemen: 64 David Boone DE; 74 James Curry DT; 57 Steve Del Col DE; 78 Vince Goldsmith DE; 77 Tony Lawson DE; 61 Matthew Lovelady DE; 58 Earl Wilson DT	Linebackers: 70 Doug Battershill; 37 Tim Bryant; 75 Mike Emery; 39 William Mitchell; 36 Don Moen; 72 Darrell Nicholson; Defensive backs: 26 Steve Ackroyd; 2 Carl Brazley; 14 Dennis Clay; 20 Ralph Dixon; 18 Lamont Meacham; 16 Lee Miller; 13 Darrell Wilson; Special teams: 8 Hank Ilesic K/P; Italics indicate International player
