= 1984 Ottawa Rough Riders season =

Canadian football team season

- Head coach: George Brancato
- Home stadium: Lansdowne Park

Results
- Record: 4–12
- Division place: 4th, East
- Playoffs: did not qualify

Uniform

Marked by two losing streaks, the 1984 Ottawa Rough Riders finished the season in fourth place in the East Division, with a 4–12 record. In the 1984 season, despite having the fifth-highest scoring offense, Ottawa had the league's worst defense, allowing 507 points scored. The Rough Riders missed the playoffs for the first time since 1970. 1984 would be coach Al Brancato's last season with the Rough Riders.

== Offseason ==
=== CFL draft ===
Round	Pick	Player	Position	School
Territorial	5	Michel Bourgeau	DT	Boise State
1	4	Maurice Martin	DB	Toronto
2	13	Dan Rashovich	LB	Simon Fraser
3	22	Damir Dupin	DL	Nevada-Las Vegas
6	49	Dave Maganja	OL	York
7	58	Mike White	DB	Waterloo
8	67	Barry Armstrong	DB	Ottawa

=== Preseason ===
Date	Opponent	Results		Attendance
Date	Opponent	Score	Record	Attendance
June 6	vs. Montreal Concordes	L 18–38	0–1	16,208
June 11	at Montreal Concordes	W 18–0	1–1	11,042
June 18	at Toronto Argonauts	W 37–11	2–1	27,005
June 22	vs. Hamilton Tiger-Cats	L 27–39	2–2	16,129

== Regular season ==
=== Standings ===
East Division
Pos	Team	Pld	W	L	T	PF	PA	PD	Pts	Div	Stk
1	Toronto Argonauts (C, Q)	16	9	6	1	461	361	100	19	5–1	L1
2	Hamilton Tiger-Cats (Q)	16	6	9	1	353	439	−86	13	4–2	W3
3	Montreal Concordes (Q)	16	6	9	1	386	404	−18	13	1–5	W1
4	Ottawa Rough Riders	16	4	12	0	354	507	−153	8	2–4	L1

Source: "CFL.ca - Official Site of the Canadian Football League". Archived from the original on 2009-10-20.
(C) First round bye; (Q) Qualified for playoffs

=== Schedule ===
Week	Game	Date	Opponent	Results		Attendance
Week	Game	Date	Opponent	Score	Record	Attendance
1	1	June 30	at Edmonton Eskimos	L 31–32	0–1	32,441
2	2	July 7	vs. Calgary Stampeders	W 17–16	1–1	20,042
3	3	July 14	vs. Hamilton Tiger-Cats	W 31–9	2–1	22,405
4	4	July 21	at Montreal Concordes	W 31–28	3–1	19,758
5	5	July 29	vs. Saskatchewan Roughriders	L 24–46	3–2	23,575
6	6	August 5	at Toronto Argonauts	L 14–49	3–3	33,077
7	7	August 11	at BC Lions	L 21–34	3–4	37,560
8	8	August 17	vs. Winnipeg Blue Bombers	L 17–46	3–5	24,204
9	Bye					
10	9	August 31	vs. Toronto Argonauts	L 20–23	3–6	25,708
11	10	September 7	at Winnipeg Blue Bombers	L 25–65	3–7	26,187
12	11	September 14	at Calgary Stampeders	L 21–23	3–8	20,120
13	12	September 21	vs. Edmonton Eskimos	W 32–23	4–8	19,387
14	13	September 30	at Saskatchewan Roughriders	L 15–31	4–9	24,747
15	Bye					
16	14	October 13	vs. BC Lions	L 17–33	4–10	21,280
17	15	October 20	at Hamilton Tiger-Cats	L 14–20	4–11	18,101
18	16	October 28	vs. Montreal Concordes	L 24–29	4–12	17,162

== Roster ==
1984 Ottawa Rough Riders final roster
Quarterbacks: 5 Joe Adams; 4 Prince McJunkins; 6 J. C. Watts; Running backs: 24 Tim McCray; 26 John Park; 32 Jim Reid; 33 Skip Walker; Wide receivers: 8 Waymon Alridge; 16 Keith Baker; 15 Reuben Eckels; 3 Dwight Edwards; 19 Dave Newman; 14 Pat Stoqua; 1 Bruce Walker; Tight ends: 73 Mike Hudson	Offensive linemen: 65 Roger Cattelan T; 52 Kevin Dalliday G/T; 54 Jim DeSilva C; 53 Warner Miles G; 67 Rudy Phillips G; 50 Kevin Powell T; 56 Bob Stephen G; 51 Pieter Vanden Bos G/C; Defensive linemen: 83 Michel Bourgeau DT; 60 Damir Dupin DT; 78 Ron Engleson DT; 63 Ray Harrison DE; 66 Greg Marshall DE; 74 Mark Seale DT; 59 Jack Williams DE	Linebackers: 34 Steve Harrison; 37 Shane Ireland; 43 Dan Rashovich; 75 Rick Sowieta; 17 Al Washington; Defensive backs: 25 Ricky Barden; 22 Charles Cornelius; 38 Charles Johnson; 21 Admiral Dewey Larry; 29 John Lynch; 23 Maurice Martin; 7 Ken Miller; 28 Junior Robinson; Special teams: 13 Ken Clark P; 2 Dean Dorsey K/P; Injured list: 55 Larry Tittley C; Italics indicate International player

== Awards and honours ==
=== CFL awards ===
- CFLPA's Most Outstanding Community Service Award – Bruce Walker (OT)

=== CFL All-Stars ===
- None

==== CFL Eastern All-Stars ====
- DE – Greg Marshall
- LB – Al Washington
- DB – Ricky Barden
