= Black College Football Hall of Fame =

American sports hall of fame

- Established: 2009 in Atlanta
- Location: Pro Football Hall of Fame; Canton, Ohio
- Type: Hall of fame
- Founders: James "Shack" Harris & Doug Williams
- Website: www.blackcollegefootballhof.org

The Black College Football Hall of Fame (BCFHOF) is an American hall of fame for college football players, coaches and contributors from historically black colleges and universities (HBCUs). It was founded in 2009 in Atlanta, centrally located to many of the country's black universities. Its museum is located within the Pro Football Hall of Fame in Canton, Ohio. Players are eligible for induction if they played at least two seasons at an HBCU and finished their college career at an HBCU. They can be nominated five years after their last college season. Any current or former head coach of an HBCU is eligible. Anyone can be nominated as a contributor.

== History ==
The BCFHOF was co-founded by James Harris and Doug Williams, former quarterbacks who both played football at the historically black university Grambling State University before playing professionally. As a rookie with the Buffalo Bills in 1969, Harris become the first black quarterback to be the starter in a season opener in either the American Football League or the National Football League (NFL). Williams was the first black quarterback to play in a Super Bowl, starting for the Washington Redskins and winning Super Bowl XXII while being named the Super Bowl MVP.

At its inception in 2009, the BCFHOF did not have a building. Its induction ceremonies and educational programs were held at various hotels in Atlanta. In 2016, the Pro Football Hall of Fame announced that it was providing a permanent home for the BCFHOF. The exhibit officially opened in 2019, held on the same weekend as the inaugural Black College Football Hall of Fame Classic at Tom Benson Hall of Fame Stadium in Canton. The BCFHOF continues to run independently with its board of directors and choosing its inductees.

In 2021, the BCFHOF partnered with the NFL, Pro Football Hall of Fame and Tulane University to establish the HBCU Legacy Bowl, a postseason all-star game for NFL draft-eligible players from HBCUs.

== Inductees ==
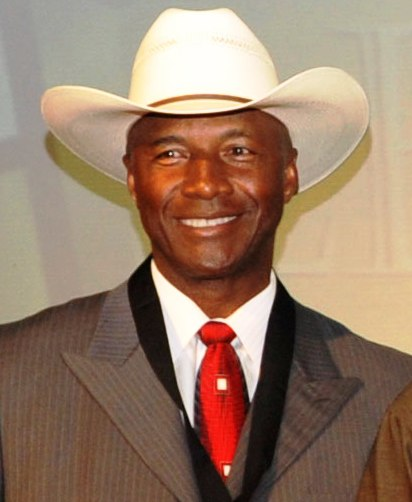
Mel Blount

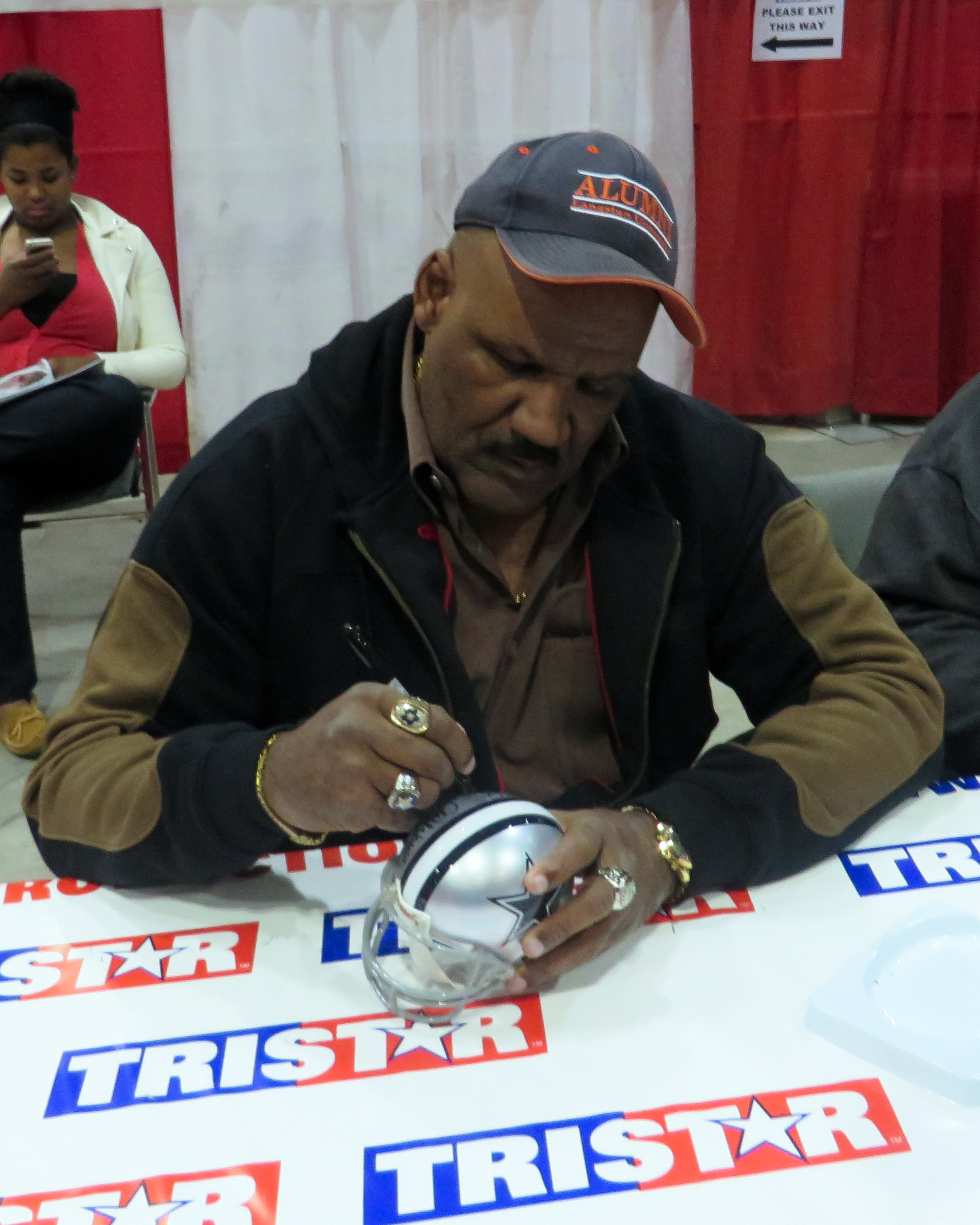
Thomas "Hollywood" Henderson

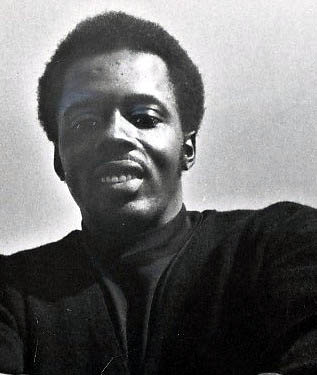
Deacon Jones

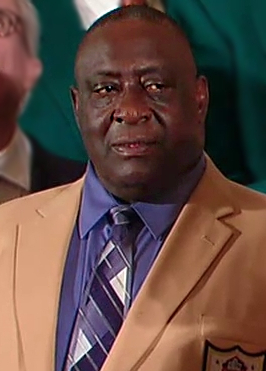
Larry Little

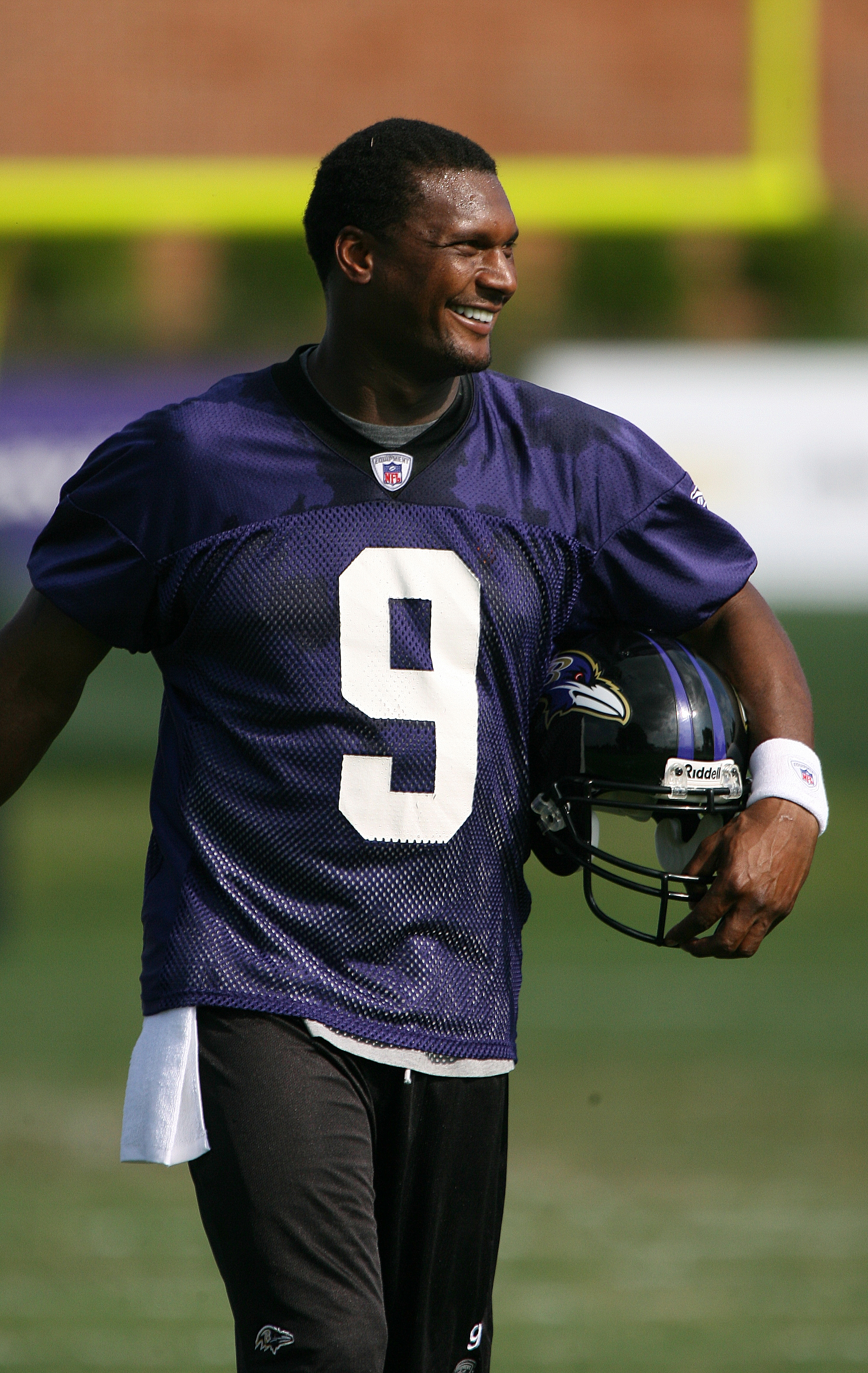
Steve McNair

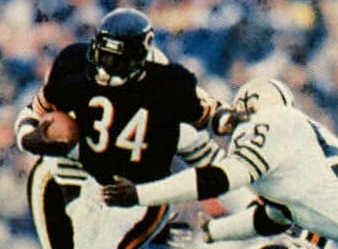
Walter Payton

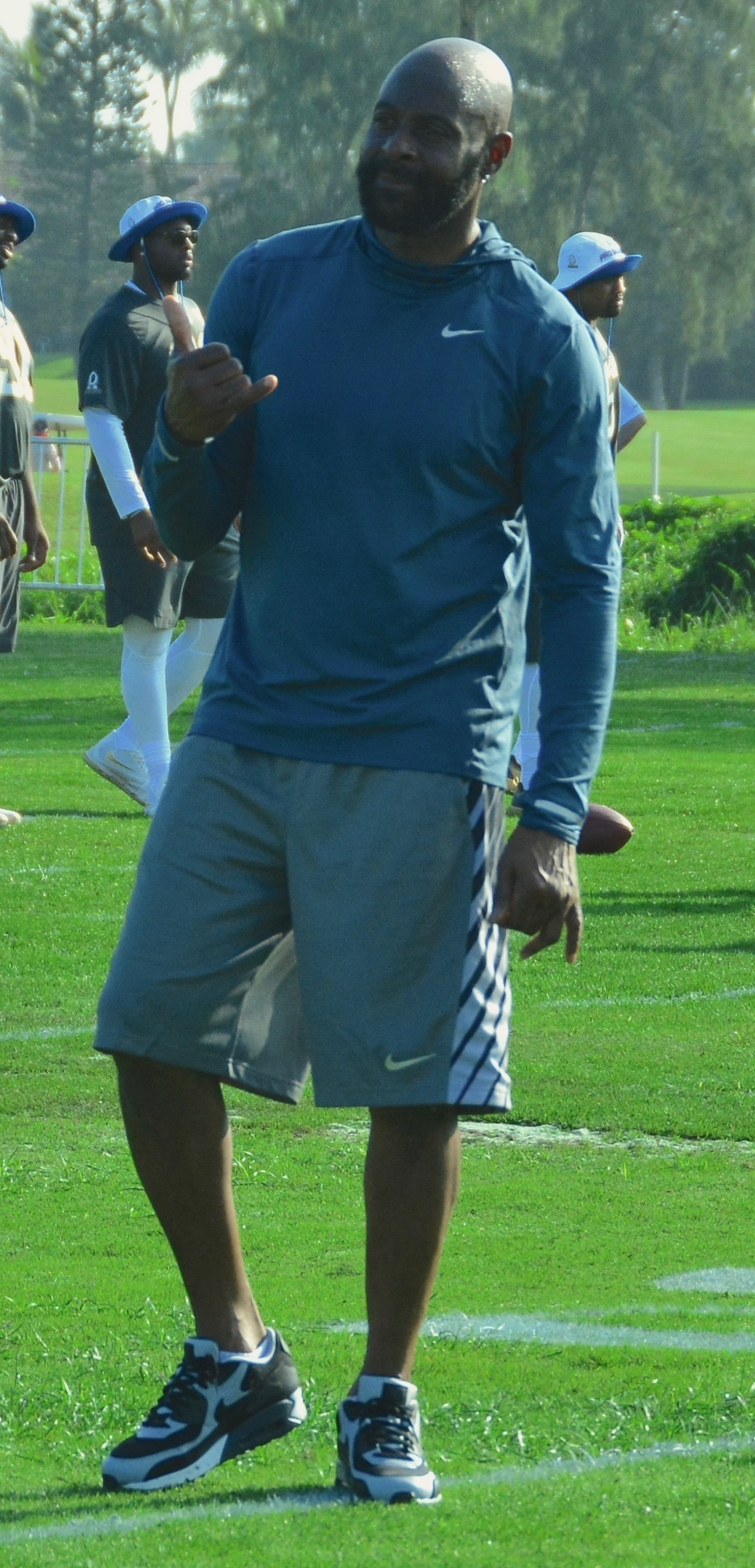
Jerry Rice

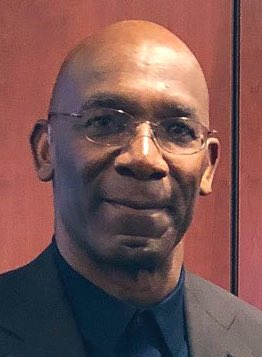
John Stallworth

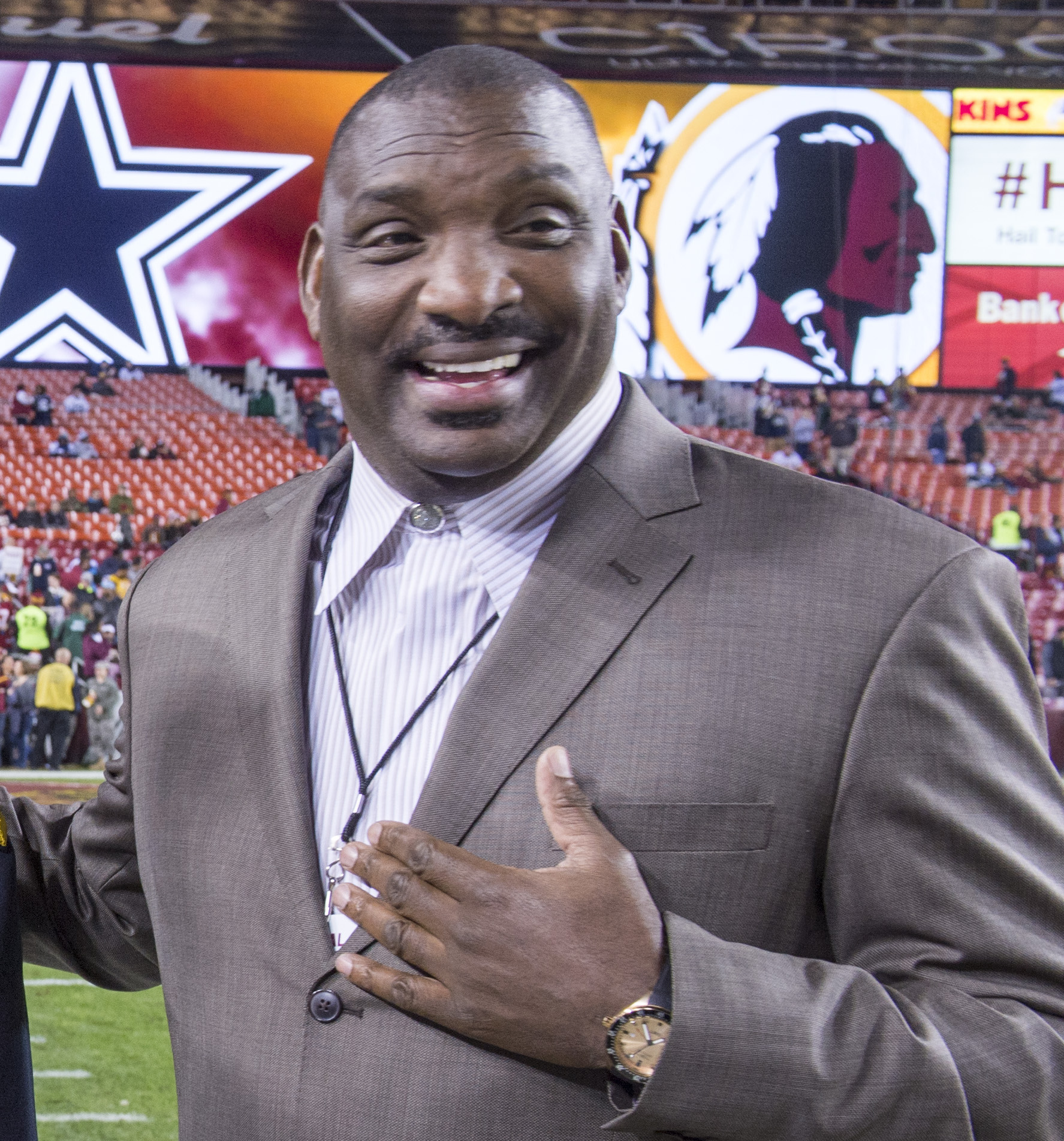
Doug Williams

Also member of College Football and Pro Football Hall of Fame**	Also member of College Football Hall of Fame §	Also member of Pro Football Hall of Fame†

Inductee	Class	Position	College(s)	Years
Buck Buchanan**	2010	OT, DE	Grambling State	1959–1962
Jake Gaither§	2010	HC	Florida A&M	1945–1969
Willie Galimore§	2010	HB	Florida A&M	1953–1956
Deacon Jones†	2010	DE	South Carolina State, Mississippi Valley State	1958, 1960
Willie Lanier**	2010	LB, G	Morgan State	1963–1966
Bill Nunn†	2010	Contributor	N/A	
Walter Payton**	2010	RB	Jackson State	1971–1974
Jerry Rice**	2010	WR	Mississippi Valley State	1981–1984
Eddie Robinson§	2010	HC	Grambling State	1941–1997
Ben Stevenson§	2010	HB	Tuskegee	1923–1930
Paul "Tank" Younger§	2010	HB, LB	Grambling State	1945–1948
Earl Banks§	2011	HC	Morgan State	1960–1973
Lem Barney†	2011	CB	Jackson State	1963–1966
Mel Blount†	2011	CB, S	Southern	1966–1969
Rosey Brown†	2011	OT	Morgan State	1949–1952
Willie Davis†	2011	OT, DE	Grambling State	1952–1955
Bob Hayes†	2011	SE	Florida A&M	1962–1965
Willie Jeffries§ (Note: He also coached to the Shockers from 1979–1983, but Wichita State University is not a HBCU.)	2011	HC	South Carolina State, Howard	1973–1978; 1989–2001, 1984–1988
Joe Kendall§	2011	HB	Kentucky State	1933–1936
Collie J. Nicholson	2011	Contributor	N/A	
Art Shell**	2011	OT	Maryland State	1964–1967
Doug Williams§	2011	QB	Grambling State	1974–1977
Cleve Abbott	2012	HC	Tuskegee	1923–1954
Willie Brown†	2012	SE, OLB	Grambling State	1959–1962
Harry Carson**	2012	DE	South Carolina State	1972–1975
Eldridge Dickey	2012	QB, P	Tennessee State	1964–1967
Jackie Graves	2012	Contributor	N/A	
James "Shack" Harris	2012	QB	Grambling State	1965–1968
Claude Humphrey†	2012	DE	Tennessee State	1964–1967
Steve McNair§	2012	QB	Alcorn State	1991–1994
Willie Richardson§	2012	E	Jackson State	1959–1962
Johnny Sample	2012	HB, K	Maryland State	1954–1957
Rayfield Wright†	2012	FS, P, DE, TE	Fort Valley State	1963–1966
Elvin Bethea†	2013	OLB	North Carolina A&T	1964–1967
Charlie Brackins	2013	QB	Prairie View A&M	1951–1954
Joe Gilliam	2013	QB	Tennessee State	1968–1971
Ken Houston†	2013	S, LB	Prairie View A&M	1964–1967
Charlie Joiner†	2013	WR	Grambling State	1965–1968
Ed "Too Tall" Jones	2013	DT	Tennessee State	1970–1973
Larry Little†	2013	OT	Bethune–Cookman	1963–1966
John Merritt§	2013	HC	Jackson State, Tennessee A&I / State	1952–1962, 1963–1983
Charlie Neal	2013	Contributor	N/A	
Shannon Sharpe†	2013	TE	Savannah State	1986–1989
Jackie Slater†	2013	OT	Jackson State	1973–1976
Robert Brazile†	2014	LB	Jackson State	1971–1974
Marino Casem§	2014	HC	Alabama State, Alcorn A&M / State, Southern	1963, 1964–1985, 1987–88; 1992
Leroy Kelly†	2014	HB	Morgan State	1960–1963
John Stallworth†	2014	WR	Alabama A&M	1970–1973
Michael Strahan†	2014	DE	Texas Southern	1989–1992
Willie Totten§	2014	QB	Mississippi Valley State	1981–1985
Doug Wilkerson	2014	G	North Carolina Central	1966–1969
Roger Brown§	2015	DT	Maryland State	1956–1959
Richard Dent†	2015	DE	Tennessee State	1979–1982
W. C. Gorden§	2015	HC	Jackson State	1976–1991
L. C. Greenwood	2015	DE	Arkansas AM&N	1965–1968
Ernie Ladd	2015	DT	Grambling State	1957–1960
Ken Riley†	2015	CB	Florida A&M	1965–1968
Donnie Shell**	2015	SS	South Carolina State	1970–1973
Ken Burrough	2016	WR	Texas Southern	1966–1969
Jethro Pugh	2016	DT	Elizabeth City State	1961–1964
Otis Taylor	2016	FL	Prairie View A&M	1961–1964
Emmitt Thomas†	2016	CB	Bishop	1962–1965
Lloyd C. A. Wells	2016	Contributor	N/A	
Aeneas Williams†	2016	CB, FS	Southern	1989–1990
Parnell Dickinson	2017	QB	Mississippi Valley State	1972–1975
Harold Jackson	2017	WR	Jackson State	1964–1967
Billy Joe§	2017	HC	Cheyney, Central State, Florida A&M, Miles	1972–1978, 1981–1993, 1994–2004, 2008–2010
Gary "Big Hands" Johnson§	2017	DT	Grambling State	1971–1974
Robert Porcher	2017	DE	Tennessee State, South Carolina State	1988–1989, 1990–1991
Isiah Robertson	2017	LB	Southern	1967–1970
Harold Carmichael†	2018	WR	Southern	1967–1970
Raymond Chester	2018	TE	Morgan State	1966–1969
Bill Hayes	2018	HC	Winston-Salem State, North Carolina A&T	1976–1987, 1988–2002
Thomas Henderson	2018	LB	Langston	1971–1974
Leo Lewis§ (Note: He is also member of Canadian Football Hall of Fame.)	2018	RB	Lincoln (MO)	1951–1954
Greg Lloyd	2018	LB	Fort Valley State	1983–1986
Everson Walls	2018	CB, S	Grambling State	1977–1980
Emerson Boozer§	2019	RB	Maryland State	1962–1965
Hugh Douglas	2019	DE	Central State	1992–1994
Rich Jackson	2019	DE	Southern	1962–1965
Frank Lewis	2019	WR	Grambling State	1967–1970
Ace Mumford§	2019	HC	Jarvis Christian, Bishop, Texas College, Southern	1924–1926, 1927–1929, 1931–1935, 1936–1961
Timmy Newsome	2019	RB	Winston-Salem State	1976–1979
John Taylor	2019	WR	Delaware State	1983–1985
Earl "Air" Harvey	2020	QB	North Carolina Central	1985–1988
James Hunter	2020	CB	Grambling State	1972–1975
Robert Mathis	2020	DE	Alabama A&M	1999–2002
Joe Taylor§	2020	HC	Howard, Virginia Union, Hampton, Florida A&M	1983, 1984–1991, 1992–2007, 2008–2012
Dennis Thomas§	2020	Contributor	N/A	
Erik Williams	2020	OT	Central State	1987–1990
Coy Bacon	2021	DE, DT	Jackson State	1962–1966
Willard Bailey	2021	HC	Virginia Union, Norfolk State, Saint Paul's (VA), Virginia–Lynchburg	1971–1983; 1995–2003, 1984–1992, 2005–2010, 2011–2013
Greg Coleman	2021	P	Florida A&M	1972–1975
Jimmie Giles	2021	TE	Alcorn State	1973–1976
Winston Hill†	2021	OT, DT	Texas Southern	1959–1962
Roynell Young	2021	S, CB	Alcorn State	1977–1979
Ben Coates	2022	TE	Livingstone College	1987–1990
Donald Driver	2022	WR	Alcorn State	1995–1998
John "Big Train" Moody	2022	RB	Morris Brown College	1939–1941
Roscoe Nance	2022	Contributor	N/A	
Nate Newton	2022	OL	Florida A&M	1979–1982
Billy Nicks§	2022	Coach	Morris Brown College, Prairie View A&M	1930–1965
Sammy White	2022	WR	Grambling State	1972–1975
Leslie Frazier	2023	DB	Alcorn State	1977–1980
Henry Lawrence	2023	OT	Florida A&M	1970–1973
Albert Lewis	2023	CB	Grambling State	1979–1982
Jim Marsalis	2023	CB	Tennessee State	1965–1968
Tyrone McGriff§	2023	OL	Florida A&M	1976–1979
Elijah Pitts	2023	HB	Philander Smith College	1957–1960
Pete Richardson	2023	Coach	Southern, Winston-Salem State	1988–2009
Johnnie Walton	2023	QB	Elizabeth City State	1965–1968
Joe "747" Adams	2024	QB	Tennessee State	1977–1980
Antoine Bethea	2024	S	Howard	2002–2005
Waymond Bryant	2024	LB	Tennessee State	1970–1973
Kevin Dent§	2024	S	Jackson State	1985–1988
Richard Huntley	2024	RB	Winston-Salem State	1992–1995
Eddie Hurt	2024	Coach	Morgan State	1929–1959
Lemar Parrish	2024	CB	Lincoln	1966–1969
Henry Dyer	2025	FB	Grambling State	1962–1965
Fred “Pop” Long	2025	HC	Paul Quinn, Wiley, Prairie View A&M, Texas College	1921–1922, 1923–1947; 1956–1965, 1948, 1949–1954
Rashean Mathis	2025	CB	Bethune-Cookman	1999–2002
Jacquay Nunnally	2025	WR	Florida A&M	1997–2000
Dominique Rodgers-Cromartie	2025	CB	Tennessee State	2004–2007
Jay “Sky” Walker	2025	QB	Howard	1991–1993
Nick Collins	2026	S	Bethune-Cookman	2002–2004
Rudy Hubbard§	2026	HC	Florida A&M	1974–1985
Tyrone Poole	2026	CB	Fort Valley State	1999–2002
Eddie Robinson Jr.	2026	CB	Alabama State	1988–1991
Jimmy Smith	2026	WR	Jackson State	1987–1991
Steve Wyche	2026	Contributor	N/A	

== Inductees by school ==
College	Number
Grambling State	16
Florida A&M	11
Jackson State	11
Tennessee State	11
Southern	8
Alcorn State	6
Morgan State	6
Prairie View A&M	5
South Carolina State	5
Howard	4
Maryland State	4
Mississippi Valley State	4
Winston-Salem State	4
Bethune–Cookman	3
Central State	3
Fort Valley State	3
Texas Southern	3
Alabama A&M	2
Alabama State	2
Bishop	2
Elizabeth City State	2
Lincoln (MO)	2
Morris Brown	2
North Carolina A&T	2
North Carolina Central	2
Texas College	2
Tuskegee	2
Virginia Union	2
Arkansas–Pine Bluff	1
Cheyney	1
Hampton	1
Jarvis Christian	1
Kentucky State	1
Langston	1
Livingstone	1
Miles	1
Norfolk State	1
Paul Quinn	1
Philander Smith	1
Saint Paul's (VA)	1
Savannah State	1
Virginia–Lynchburg	1
Wiley	1

== See also ==
- College Football Hall of Fame
