= 1984 Calgary Stampeders season =

Canadian football team season

- General manager: Steve Buratto
- Head coach: Steve Buratto
- Home stadium: McMahon Stadium

Results
- Record: 6–10
- Division place: 5th, West
- Playoffs: did not qualify

The 1984 Calgary Stampeders finished in fifth place in the West Division with a 6–10 record and failed to make the playoffs.

== Regular season ==
=== Season standings ===
West Division
Pos	Team	Pld	W	L	T	PF	PA	PD	Pts
1	BC Lions (C, Q)	16	12	3	1	445	281	+164	25
2	Winnipeg Blue Bombers (Q)	16	11	4	1	523	309	+214	23
3	Edmonton Eskimos (Q)	16	9	7	0	464	443	+21	18
4	Saskatchewan Roughriders	16	6	9	1	348	479	−131	13
5	Calgary Stampeders	16	6	10	0	314	425	−111	12

Source: "CFL.ca - Official Site of the Canadian Football League". Archived from the original on 2009-10-20.
(C) First round bye; (Q) Qualified for playoffs

=== Season schedule ===
Week	Game	Date	Opponent	Results		Venue	Attendance
Week	Game	Date	Opponent	Score	Record	Venue	Attendance
	1	Fri, June 29	vs. Winnipeg Blue Bombers	W 24–17	1–0	McMahon Stadium	21,812
	2	Sat, July 7	at Ottawa Rough Riders	L 16–17	1–1	Lansdowne Park	20,042
	3	Fri, July 13	at Edmonton Eskimos	L 13–40	1–2	Commonwealth Stadium	40,215
	4	Fri, July 20	vs. Hamilton Tiger-Cats	W 23–18	2–2	McMahon Stadium	20,769
	5	Fri, July 27	vs. Toronto Argonauts	L 17–43	2–3	McMahon Stadium	22,761
	6	Sat, Aug 4	at Montreal Concordes	L 14–28	2–4	Olympic Stadium	15,363
	7	Sun, Aug 19	vs. Saskatchewan Roughriders	W 32–11	3–4	McMahon Stadium	23,422
	8	Sat, Aug 25	at BC Lions	L 4–15	3–5	BC Place	38,419
	9	Mon, Sept 3	vs. Edmonton Eskimos	L 28–30	3–6	McMahon Stadium	26,046
	10	Sun, Sept 9	at Saskatchewan Roughriders	W 32–18	4–6	Taylor Field	23,042
	11	Fri, Sept 14	vs. Ottawa Rough Riders	W 23–21	5–6	McMahon Stadium	20,120
	12	Sun, Sept 23	at Hamilton Tiger-Cats	L 26–29	5–7	Ivor Wynne Stadium	12,501
	13	Sat, Sept 29	vs. Montreal Concordes	L 13–27	5–8	McMahon Stadium	20,229
	14	Mon, Oct 8	at Winnipeg Blue Bombers	L 8–46	6–8	Winnipeg Stadium	28,025
	15	Sun, Oct 14	at Toronto Argonauts	W 28–24	7–8	Exhibition Stadium	30,406
	16	Sat, Oct 20	vs. BC Lions	L 13–41	7–9	McMahon Stadium	23,230

== Roster ==
1984 Calgary Stampeders final roster
Quarterbacks: 8 Danny Barrett; 7 Bernard Quarles; 13 Greg Vavra; Running backs: 16 Phil Carter; 34 Les Kaminski; 12 Tim Petros; 6 Lewis Walker; Wide receivers: 3 Phil Charron; 88 Michael Harper; 73 William James; 21 Mike Levenseller; 9 Mike McTague P; 22 Tom Scott; 89 Michael Wade	Offensive linemen: 41 Kerry Berryman C; 65 Jerry Dobrovolny T; 51 Jeff Inglis T; 69 Dave Kirzinger G; 59 Bob Lubig G; 68 Kevin Molle G/T; 67 Brian Strong; 61 Willie Thomas G/C; Defensive linemen: 57 Walter Ballard DE; 97 Sean McKeown DT; 84 Ken Moore DT; 62 Randy Trautman DT; 66 Steve Wilburn DE/DT; 76 Lyall Woznesensky DE	Linebackers: 96 Steve Carpenter; 72 Bernie Morrison; 82 Mark Nelson; 58 James West; Defensive backs: 27 Richie Hall; 14 Larry Hogue; 15 Ron Hopkins; 28 Melvin Jenkins; 4 Darrell Moir; 32 Ray Odums; 24 Greg Peterson; Special teams: 2 J. T. Hay K; Injured list: Scott MacArthur DE; Italics indicate International player

== Awards and records ==
=== 1984 CFL All-Stars ===
- None
