= Lewis Walker =

Lewis Walker may refer to:

- Lewis Walker (footballer) (born 1999), English footballer
- Lewis Walker (Canadian football) (born 1958), American player of Canadian football
- Lewis L. Walker, U.S. Representative from Kentucky

== See also ==
- Walker Lewis, African-American abolitionist, Freemason, and Mormon elder
