= 1984 Hamilton Tiger-Cats season =

Season of Canadian Football League team the Hamilton Tiger-Cats

- Head coach: Al Bruno
- Home stadium: Ivor Wynne Stadium

Results
- Record: 6–9–1
- Division place: 2nd, East
- Playoffs: Lost Grey Cup
- Team MOP: Rufus Crawford
- Team MOC: Bernie Ruoff
- Team MOR: Rod Skillman

Uniform

The 1984 Hamilton Tiger-Cats season was the 27th season for the team in the Canadian Football League (CFL) and their 35th overall. The Tiger-Cats finished in second place in the East Division with a 6–9–1 record. They appeared in the 72nd Grey Cup game, but lost to the Winnipeg Blue Bombers.

== Roster ==
1984 Hamilton Tiger-Cats final roster
Quarterbacks: 5 Dieter Brock; 12 Pete Gales; 9 Jeff Tedford; Running backs: 22 Mark Bragagnolo; 21 Rufus Crawford; 32 Dave Graffi; 33 Kelvin Lindsey; 19 Johnny Shepherd; Wide receivers: 7 DeWayne Jett; 6 Ron Johnson; 17 Wayne Lee; 3 Steve Stapler; Tight ends: 23 Rocky Dipietro; 74 Steve Jackson; 24 Steve Kearns	Offensive linemen: 63 Marv Allemang T/G; 53 Jeff Arp G; 51 Pat Brady G; 54 Ross Francis G; 60 Bill Howard C; 56 Jason Riley T; 67 Ralph Scholz T; 50 Henry Waszczuk C; Defensive linemen: 77 Grover Covington DE; 64 Leon Lyszkiewicz DT; 65 Mitchell Price DT; 88 Dave Sauve DE; 59 Rod Skillman DT/DE; 61 Mike Walker DT/DE; Special teams: 10 Bernie Ruoff K/P	Linebackers: 72 Leo Ezerins; 41 Greg Gary; 39 Ed Gataveckas; 34 Mike Graffi; 36 John Priestner; 31 Ben Zambiasi; Defensive backs: 24 Paul Bennett; 14 Gerald Bess; 15 Less Browne; 16 Howard Fields; 37 Terry Lehne; 26 Mike McIntyre; 20 Mark Streeter; 28 Felix Wright; Injured list: 47 Tony Marrone C; 27 Dom Vetro WR; Italics indicate American players

== Preseason ==
Week	Date	Opponent	Result	Record
A	June 5	at Toronto Argonauts	W 13–6	1–0
B	June 11	vs. Toronto Argonauts	L 17–18	1–1
C	June 17	vs. Montreal Concordes	L 17–30	1–2
D	June 22	at Ottawa Rough Riders	W 39–27	2–2

== Regular season ==
=== Season standings ===
East Division
Pos	Team	Pld	W	L	T	PF	PA	PD	Pts	Div	Stk
1	Toronto Argonauts (C, Q)	16	9	6	1	461	361	100	19	5–1	L1
2	Hamilton Tiger-Cats (Q)	16	6	9	1	353	439	−86	13	4–2	W3
3	Montreal Concordes (Q)	16	6	9	1	386	404	−18	13	1–5	W1
4	Ottawa Rough Riders	16	4	12	0	354	507	−153	8	2–4	L1

(C) First round bye; (Q) Qualified for playoffs

=== Season schedule ===
Week	Date	Opponent	Result	Record
1	June 30	at Montreal Concordes	W 49–31	1–0
2	July 8	vs. Saskatchewan Roughriders	T 27–27	1–0–1
3	July 14	at Ottawa Rough Riders	L 9–31	1–1–1
4	July 20	at Calgary Stampeders	L 18–23	1–2–1
5	July 28	vs. Winnipeg Blue Bombers	L 20–42	1–3–1
6	Bye			
7	Aug 12	vs. Toronto Argonauts	L 22–30	1–4–1
8	Aug 19	vs. BC Lions	L 11–19	1–5–1
9	Aug 24	at Edmonton Eskimos	L 14–35	1–6–1
10	Sept 3	vs. Montreal Concordes	W 30–11	2–6–1
11	Sept 9	at BC Lions	L 11–46	2–7–1
12	Sept 15	at Winnipeg Blue Bombers	L 16–48	2–8–1
13	Sept 23	vs. Calgary Stampeders	W 29–26	3–8–1
14	Bye			
15	Oct 7	vs. Edmonton Eskimos	L 21–28	3–9–1
16	Oct 14	at Saskatchewan Roughriders	W 31–8	4–9–1
17	Oct 20	vs. Ottawa Rough Riders	W 20–14	5–9–1
18	Oct 27	at Toronto Argonauts	W 25–20	6–9–1

== Postseason ==
=== Schedule ===
Game	Date	Opponent	Result
East Semi-Final	Nov 4	vs. Montreal Concordes	W 17–11
East Final	Nov 11	at Toronto Argonauts	W 14–13
Grey Cup	Nov 18	Winnipeg Blue Bombers	L 17–47

==== Grey Cup ====
Teams	1 Q	2 Q	3 Q	4 Q	Final
Hamilton Tiger-Cats	14	3	0	0	17
Winnipeg Blue Bombers	3	27	3	14	47

== Awards and honours ==
- Terry Evanshen was elected into the Canadian Football Hall of Fame as a Player, March 16, 1984.
- Tony Gabriel was elected into the Canadian Football Hall of Fame as a Player, August 18, 1984.
- Jacob Gaudaur was elected into the Canadian Football Hall of Fame as a Player as a Builder, March 16, 1984.

=== 1984 CFL All-Stars ===
- Bernie Ruoff, Punter
