= 1984 BC Lions season =

Canadian football team season

- General manager: Bob Ackles
- Head coach: Don Matthews
- Home stadium: BC Place Stadium

Results
- Record: 12–3–1
- Division place: 1st, West
- Playoffs: Lost West Final

The 1984 BC Lions finished in first place in the West Division with a 12–3–1 record. They appeared in the West Final but lost to the Winnipeg Blue Bombers.

Joe Kapp and Tom Brown were inducted into the Football Hall of Fame.

== Offseason ==
=== CFL draft ===
Round	Pick	Player	Position	School
T	T	Laurent DesLauriers	Defensive back	UBC
1	1	Frank Balkovec	Linebacker	Toronto
2	17	Roy Kurtz	Kicker	Wilfrid Laurier
4	27	Murry McKay	Centre	Alberta
5	35	Joe Brouwers	Defensive end	Wilfrid Laurier
5	45	Tom Timlin	Defensive back	Carleton
6	53	Irv Daymond	Guard	Western Ontario
7	62	Greg Kitchen	Linebacker	UBC
8	71	Brad Peperdy	Cornerback	Saskatchewan

== Preseason ==
Game	Date	Opponent	Results		Venue	Attendance
Game	Date	Opponent	Score	Record	Venue	Attendance
A	Tue, June 5	vs. Calgary Stampeders	W 55–17	1–0	McMahon Stadium	20,583
B	Mon, June 11	vs. Edmonton Eskimos	W 32–8	2–0	BC Place	28,732
C	Mon, June 18	vs. Saskatchewan Roughriders	W 24–18	3–0	BC Place	28,619
D	Thu, June 21	at Winnipeg Blue Bombers	W 13–4	4–0	Winnipeg Stadium	24,809

== Regular season ==
=== Season standings ===
West Division
Pos	Team	Pld	W	L	T	PF	PA	PD	Pts
1	BC Lions (C, Q)	16	12	3	1	445	281	+164	25
2	Winnipeg Blue Bombers (Q)	16	11	4	1	523	309	+214	23
3	Edmonton Eskimos (Q)	16	9	7	0	464	443	+21	18
4	Saskatchewan Roughriders	16	6	9	1	348	479	−131	13
5	Calgary Stampeders	16	6	10	0	314	425	−111	12

Source: "CFL.ca - Official Site of the Canadian Football League". Archived from the original on 2009-10-20.
(C) First round bye; (Q) Qualified for playoffs

=== Season schedule ===
Week	Game	Date	Opponent	Results		Venue	Attendance
Week	Game	Date	Opponent	Score	Record	Venue	Attendance
1	Bye						
2	1	Fri, July 6	vs. Edmonton Eskimos	W 44–10	1–0	BC Place	43,501
3	2	Sun, July 15	at Toronto Argonauts	W 39–29	2–0	Exhibition Stadium	34,092
4	3	Sun, July 22	at Winnipeg Blue Bombers	L 3–25	2–1	Winnipeg Stadium	31,113
5	4	Sat, July 28	vs. Montreal Concordes	W 22–7	3–1	BC Place	39,991
6	5	Sun, Aug 5	at Saskatchewan Roughriders	W 29–27	4–1	Taylor Field	24,558
7	6	Sat, Aug 11	vs. Ottawa Rough Riders	W 46–34	5–1	BC Place	37,560
8	7	Sun, Aug 19	at Hamilton Tiger-Cats	W 19–11	6–1	Ivor Wynne Stadium	14,101
9	8	Sat, Aug 25	vs. Calgary Stampeders	W 15–4	7–1	BC Place	38,419
10	Bye						
11	9	Sun, Sept 9	vs. Hamilton Tiger-Cats	W 46–11	8–1	BC Place	34,630
12	10	Sat, Sept 15	at Montreal Concordes	L 17–33	8–2	Olympic Stadium	15,085
13	11	Sat, Sept 22	vs. Saskatchewan Roughriders	L 28–37	8–3	BC Place	35,955
14	12	Fri, Sept 28	at Edmonton Eskimos	W 34–32	9–3	Commonwealth Stadium	47,015
15	13	Sat, Oct 6	vs. Toronto Argonauts	T 21–21	9–3–1	BC Place	49,358
16	14	Sat, Oct 13	at Ottawa Rough Riders	W 40–33	10–3–1	Lansdowne Park	21,280
17	15	Sat, Oct 20	at Calgary Stampeders	W 41–13	11–3–1	McMahon Stadium	23,230
18	16	Sat, Oct 27	vs. Winnipeg Blue Bombers	W 20–3	12–3–1	BC Place	59,421

== Roster ==
1984 BC Lions final roster
Quarterbacks: 14 Tim Cowan; 9 Roy Dewalt; Running backs: 23 Keyvan Jenkins; 33 Ryan Potter; 19 Don Taylor; 20 John Henry White; Wide receivers: 8 Ned Armour; 71 Jacques Chapdelaine; 24 Mervyn Fernandez; 21 John Pankratz; 72 Ron Robinson; 6 Jim Sandusky; 36 Henry Vereen; Tight ends: 3 Mark Debrueys	Offensive linemen: 68 John Blain T/G; 69 Jamie Buis C/T; 67 Dennis Guevin T; 61 Bryan Illerbrun T; 54 Glenn Leonhard G; 65 Gerald Roper G; 52 Al Wilson C; Defensive linemen: 66 Ron Cherkas DT/DE; 63 Randy Fournier DT; 99 Nick Hebeler DE; 90 Rick Klassen DT/DE; 78 Mack Moore DT; 40 James Parker DE	Linebackers: 91 Tyrone Crews; 7 Bernie Glier; 37 Glen Jackson; 31 Kevin Konar; 45 Dave McNeel; Defensive backs: 10 Melvin Byrd; 1 Darnell Clash; 28 Larry Crawford; 18 Keith Gooch; 32 Andre Jones; 26 Ed Jones; 4 Nelson Martin; Special teams: 5 Lui Passaglia K/P; Italics indicate International player

== Awards and records ==
- CFL's Most Outstanding Defensive Player Award – James "Quick" Parker (DE)

=== 1984 CFL All-Stars ===
- WR – Mervyn Fernandez, CFL All-Star
- OT – John Blain, CFL All-Star
- K – Lui Passaglia, CFL All-Star
- DT – Mack Moore, CFL All-Star
- DE – James "Quick" Parker, CFL All-Star
- DB – Larry Crawford, CFL All-Star

== Playoffs ==
=== West Final ===
Team	Q1	Q2	Q3	Q4	Total
Winnipeg Blue Bombers	3	14	8	6	31
BC Lions	1	6	7	0	14
