= 1984 Winnipeg Blue Bombers season =

Canadian football team season

- General manager: Cal Murphy
- Head coach: Cal Murphy
- Home stadium: Winnipeg Stadium

Results
- Record: 11–4–1
- Division place: 2nd, West
- Playoffs: Won Grey Cup

Uniform

The Winnipeg Blue Bombers finished in second place in the 1984 CFL season West Division with an 11–4–1 record. They closed out the season by winning the Grey Cup 47–17 over the Hamilton Tiger-Cats. This is their first Grey Cup victory since 1962.

== Roster ==
1984 Winnipeg Blue Bombers final roster
Quarterbacks: 2 Tom Clements; 12 John Hufnagel; Running backs: 33 Pat Cantner; 30 Dan Huclack; 39 Sean Kehoe; 38 Willard Reaves; Receivers: 70 Jeff Boyd; 29 Jerome Erdman; 31 Rick House; 21 James Murphy; 25 Kevin Neiles; 71 Joe Poplawski	Offensive linemen: 65 Nick Bastaja G; 59 Lyle Bauer T; 68 Val Belcher G; 43 John Bonk C; 50 Mark Moors G/C; 62 Richard Nemeth T; 66 Paul Palma T; 63 Chris Walby T; Defensive linemen: 64 Doug MacIver NG; 75 Stan Mikawos NG; 55 Tony Norman DE; 78 Brent Racette DE; 57 John Sturdivant DE	Linebackers: 52 Aaron Brown; 72 Delbert Fowler; 35 Tyrone Jones; 74 Vernon Pahl; 56 Darrell Patterson; 73 John Pitts; 37 Frank Robinson; Defensive backs: 14 Scott Flagel; 24 Ken Hailey; 7 Dave Ploughman; 20 Donovan Rose; 36 David Shaw; 28 Wylie Turner; Special teams: 6 Bob Cameron P; 3 Trevor Kennerd K; Italics indicate American player

== Preseason ==
Game	Date	Opponent	Results		Venue	Attendance
Game	Date	Opponent	Score	Record	Venue	Attendance
A	Sun, June 3	at Saskatchewan Roughriders	W 21–14	1–0	Taylor Field	20,918
B	Sun, June 10	vs. Calgary Stampeders	W 29–13	2–0	Winnipeg Stadium	22,500
C	Fri, June 15	at Edmonton Eskimos	W 25–11	3–0	Commonwealth Stadium	31,382
D	Thu, June 21	vs. BC Lions	L 4–13	3–1	Winnipeg Stadium	24,809

== Regular season ==
=== Standings ===
West Division
Pos	Team	Pld	W	L	T	PF	PA	PD	Pts
1	BC Lions (C, Q)	16	12	3	1	445	281	+164	25
2	Winnipeg Blue Bombers (Q)	16	11	4	1	523	309	+214	23
3	Edmonton Eskimos (Q)	16	9	7	0	464	443	+21	18
4	Saskatchewan Roughriders	16	6	9	1	348	479	−131	13
5	Calgary Stampeders	16	6	10	0	314	425	−111	12

Source: "CFL.ca - Official Site of the Canadian Football League". Archived from the original on 2009-10-20.
(C) First round bye; (Q) Qualified for playoffs

=== Schedule ===
Week	Game	Date	Opponent	Results		Venue	Attendance
Week	Game	Date	Opponent	Score	Record	Venue	Attendance
1	1	Fri, June 29	at Calgary Stampeders	L 17–24	0–1	McMahon Stadium	21,812
2	2	Sun, July 8	vs. Toronto Argonauts	W 28–26	1–1	Winnipeg Stadium	25,235
3	Bye						
4	3	Sun, July 22	vs. BC Lions	W 25–3	2–1	Winnipeg Stadium	31,113
5	4	Sat, July 28	at Hamilton Tiger-Cats	W 42–20	3–1	Ivor Wynne Stadium	17,301
6	5	Fri, Aug 3	at Edmonton Eskimos	W 22–21	4–1	Commonwealth Stadium	40,470
7	6	Fri, Aug 10	vs. Montreal Concordes	W 45–15	5–1	Winnipeg Stadium	26,716
8	7	Fri, Aug 17	at Ottawa Rough Riders	W 46–17	6–1	Lansdowne Park	24,204
9	8	Sun, Aug 26	vs. Saskatchewan Roughriders	W 48–28	7–1	Winnipeg Stadium	27,213
10	9	Sun, Sept 2	at Saskatchewan Roughriders	L 25–30	7–2	Taylor Field	25,204
11	10	Fri, Sept 7	vs. Ottawa Rough Riders	W 65–25	8–2	Winnipeg Stadium	26,187
12	11	Sat, Sept 15	vs. Hamilton Tiger-Cats	W 48–16	9–2	Winnipeg Stadium	32,946
13	12	Sat, Sept 22	at Montreal Concordes	T 14–14	9–2–1	Olympic Stadium	17,854
14	13	Sun, Sept 30	at Toronto Argonauts	L 19–31	9–3–1	Exhibition Stadium	35,401
15	14	Mon, Oct 8	vs. Calgary Stampeders	W 46–8	10–3–1	Winnipeg Stadium	28,025
16	Bye						
17	15	Sun, Oct 21	vs. Edmonton Eskimos	W 30–11	11–3–1	Winnipeg Stadium	29,135
18	16	Sat, Oct 27	at BC Lions	L 3–20	11–4–1	BC Place	59,421

== Playoffs ==
=== West Semi-Final ===
Team	Q1	Q2	Q3	Q4	Total
Edmonton Eskimos	0	7	7	6	20
Winnipeg Blue Bombers	15	8	10	22	55

=== West Final ===
Team	Q1	Q2	Q3	Q4	Total
Winnipeg Blue Bombers	3	14	8	6	31
BC Lions	1	6	7	0	14

=== Grey Cup ===
Team	Q1	Q2	Q3	Q4	Total
Hamilton Tiger-Cats	14	3	0	0	17
Winnipeg Blue Bombers	3	27	3	14	47
