= 1984 Montreal Concordes season =

- Owner: Charles Bronfman
- Head coach: Joe Galat
- Home stadium: Olympic Stadium

Results
- Record: 6–9–1
- Division place: 3rd, East
- Playoffs: Lost East Semi-Final

The 1984 Montreal Concordes finished the season in third place in the East Division with a 6–9–1 record and lost in the East Semi-Final.

== Preseason ==
Game	Date	Opponent	Results		Venue	Attendance
Game	Date	Opponent	Score	Record	Venue	Attendance
A	June 6	at Ottawa Rough Riders	W 38–18	1–0	Lansdowne Park	16,208
B	June 11	vs. Ottawa Rough Riders	L 0–18	1–1	Olympic Stadium	11,042
C	June 17	at Hamilton Tiger-Cats	W 30–17	2–1	Ivor Wynne Stadium	10,953
D	June 22	vs. Toronto Argonauts	W 31–26	3–1	Olympic Stadium	9,164

== Regular season ==
=== Standings ===
East Division
Pos	Team	Pld	W	L	T	PF	PA	PD	Pts	Div	Stk
1	Toronto Argonauts (C, Q)	16	9	6	1	461	361	100	19	5–1	L1
2	Hamilton Tiger-Cats (Q)	16	6	9	1	353	439	−86	13	4–2	W3
3	Montreal Concordes (Q)	16	6	9	1	386	404	−18	13	1–5	W1
4	Ottawa Rough Riders	16	4	12	0	354	507	−153	8	2–4	L1

Source: "CFL.ca - Official Site of the Canadian Football League". Archived from the original on 2009-10-20.
(C) First round bye; (Q) Qualified for playoffs

=== Schedule ===
Week	Game	Date	Opponent	Results		Venue	Attendance
Week	Game	Date	Opponent	Score	Record	Venue	Attendance
1	1	June 30	vs. Hamilton Tiger-Cats	L 31–49	0–1	Olympic Stadium	16,569
2	Bye						
3	2	July 15	vs. Saskatchewan Roughriders	W 32–16	1–1	Taylor Field	23,006
4	3	July 21	vs. Ottawa Rough Riders	L 28–31	1–2	Olympic Stadium	19,758
5	4	July 28	vs. BC Lions	L 7–22	1–3	BC Place	39,991
6	5	Aug 4	vs. Calgary Stampeders	W 28–14	2–3	Olympic Stadium	15,363
7	6	Aug 10	at Winnipeg Blue Bombers	L 15–45	2–4	Winnipeg Stadium	26,716
8	7	Aug 18	vs. Edmonton Eskimos	W 44–24	3–4	Olympic Stadium	16,187
9	8	Aug 26	at Toronto Argonauts	L 23–29	3–5	Exhibition Stadium	35,319
10	9	Sept 3	at Hamilton Tiger-Cats	L 11–30	3–6	Ivor Wynne Stadium	12,888
11	Bye						
12	10	Sept 15	vs. BC Lions	W 33–17	4–6	Olympic Stadium	15,085
13	11	Sept 22	vs. Winnipeg Blue Bombers	T 14–14	4–6–1	Olympic Stadium	17,854
14	12	Sept 29	at Calgary Stampeders	W 27–13	5–6–1	McMahon Stadium	20,229
15	13	Oct 6	vs. Saskatchewan Roughriders	L 24–30	5–7–1	Olympic Stadium	18,296
16	14	Oct 13	at Edmonton Eskimos	L 26–29	5–8–1	Commonwealth Stadium	42,766
17	15	Oct 21	vs. Toronto Argonauts	L 14–17	5–9–1	Olympic Stadium	19,652
18	16	Oct 28	at Ottawa Rough Riders	W 29–24	6–9–1	Lansdowne Park	17,162

== Postseason ==
Game	Date	Opponent	Results		Venue	Attendance
Game	Date	Opponent	Score	Record	Venue	Attendance
East Semi-Final	Nov 4	at Hamilton Tiger-Cats	L 11–17	0–1	Ivor Wynne Stadium	20,756

== Roster ==
1984 Montreal Concordes final roster
Quarterbacks: 9 Gerry Dattilio; 12 Turner Gill; 11 Steve Smith; Running backs: 34 Denny Ferdinand; 33 Chuck McMann; 30 Dwaine Wilson; Wide receivers: 20 Harold Bailey; 29 Todd Brown; 2 Brian DeRoo; 80 Jeff Patterson; 22 Mike Washburn; Tight ends: 79 Nick Arakgi	Offensive linemen: 67 Trevor Bowles T; 66 Lloyd Fairbanks T/G; 65 Miles Gorrell T; 58 Glenn Keeble G/C; 60 Blake Nill T; 53 Doug Smith G; 54 Rob Smith G; Defensive linemen: 89 Sandy Armstrong DE; 76 Gene Belliveau DT/DE; 72 Paul Martin DE; 49 Steve Raquet DE; 70 Doug Scott DT/DE; 64 Glen Weir DT; Special teams: 7 Gerry McGrath P/K; 10 Don Sweet K/P	Linebackers: 75 Ken Ciancone; 45 Orlando Flanagan; 42 Paul Gray; 77 Mark Hopkins; 51 Frank Kosec; 47 John Pointer; Defensive backs: 1 Andre Francis; 8 Aaron Hill; 6 Phil Jones; 27 Pete Lavorato; 18 Vince Phason; 26 Harry Skipper; 17 Preston Young; Injured list: Roy Kurtz K; Italics indicate American players
