= St. Joseph High School (Edmonton) =

School in Edmonton, Canada

Location
- 10830 109 Street NW; Edmonton, Alberta, T5H 3C1; Canada; 53°33′14″N 113°30′33″W

Information
- School type: Secondary school
- Motto: Palma Non Sine Pulvere
- Religious affiliation: Roman Catholic
- Founded: 1930
- School board: Edmonton Catholic School District
- Superintendent: Lynnette Anderson
- Area trustee: Alene Mutala
- Principal: Todd Eistetter
- Grades: 10-12
- Enrollment: 1850
- Language: English, French, Spanish, Nehiyaw Pimatisiwin Cree
- Campus: Inner city area
- Colours: Blue & White
- Athletics conference: Metro Edmonton High School Athletic Association
- Mascot: Taz
- Team name: Saints
- Website: stjoseph.ecsd.net

St. Joseph Catholic High School is a secondary school located in North-Central Edmonton. It is the largest high school in Alberta by area.

== History ==
St. Joseph High School first opened in 1930 as the first high school for the Catholic boys in the Edmonton region. In the 1950s with the closing of St. Mary's High School, St. Joseph opened its doors to girls. Since 1998, St. Joseph's High School has offered self-directed learning programs.

== Programs of Study ==
- Guided Customized Learning (GCL)
- Traditional Classroom-Based Learning (TCL), based on semesters
- Guided Digital Learning (GDL)
- Modular Delivery Learning (MDL)
- Quarterly Classroom Learning (QTR)
- Knowledge and Employability
- WIN Program (formerly Educational Experiences)
- English Language Learning
- Dual Credit Program
- Nehiyaw Pimatisiwin Cree Language and Culture Program & Braided Journey FMNI
- Diploma Self Regulated Learning (DSRL)
- ECSD Online Schooling 10-12
- * 4th and 5th year programming

Within these programs exists a Career Skills Centre that is Edmonton Catholic School District's new centralized technical and trade career education site. The Skills Centre allows students from around the district to take part in CTS programs not necessarily available at their home school.

The Guided Customized Learning Program, Nehiyaw Pimatisiwin Cree Language and Culture program, is open to all student residing within the city limit.

== Knowledge and Employability ==
The Knowledge and Employability (K&E) program is offered at St. Joseph for students who learn best through experiences that integrate essential and employability skills in occupational contexts. Traditionally, students enrolled in the K&E program in Alberta will earn only their Certificate of Achievement and not a Diploma. At St. Joseph, The K&E program is referred to as the Dash 4 Pathway as students are presented with an opportunity to still achieve their Alberta High School Diploma as well as their Certificate of Achievement. Through the Guided Customized Learning program, students in Dash-4 can choose to take on six additional classes to bridge from dash-4 courses to dash-2, thus satisfying Alberta Diploma requirements.

== WIN Program ==
The WIN Program is a program of choice for high school student that have a mild to severe learning need. Student enrolled in this program obtain a Certificate of Completion and have the option to partake in Dash-4 Pathway depending on student academic success. This program also have scheduled lecture within the WIN Program as well. The main goal for the WIN Program is developing students strength, communication, social and learning skills, as well as living, vocational, leisure and recreational skills.

The WIN Program are facilitated by staff employed and/or contracted by the Edmonton Catholic School District and/or Alberta Health Services staff include but are not limited to:

- Occupational Therapist
- Speech Therapist
- Emotional Behavior Specialist
- Family School Liaison Worker
- Mental Health Therapist
- Adapted Physical Education Specialist
- Physical Therapist
- Vision and Hearing Consultant

Each student in the WIN Program receive an Individualized Program Plan (IPP) for teachers and parents to monitor their child's academic success and focus on area and aspect that need improvement. Most WIN students don't receive a report card.

=== Work Study ===
Students in the WIN Program will also have the option to partake in Work Study Placement each placement are individualized to each student depending on student interest. The WIN Program also have an on-site Work Study Coordinator helping student and staff look and determine placement for each students. There is no boundary for the Work Study Placement as long if it within the City Of Edmonton limit.

== Athletics ==
The Saints compete in the Metro Edmonton High School Athletic Association in various sports such as basketball, football, soccer, volleyball, track and field, badminton, cross country, curling, golf, and swimming. In the 1981/82 school year, St. Joes became the first and only catholic high school in Edmonton to ever win a triple crown in which they won a Senior City Championship in Football, Basketball, and Soccer all in a single school year.

=== Father Michael Troy Tournament ===
Every year since 1984, St. Joseph has hosted the Father Michael Troy Basketball tournament. Teams from around Canada have participated in the tournament since its inception. Recently, teams from Marburg, Germany have competed.

== Notable alumni ==
- Don Barry – Football player and three-time Grey Cup winner for the Edmonton Eskimos
- Eddie Carroll – Voice actor known as the voice of Jiminey Cricket for 37 years
- Peter Cunningham – Seven-time world champion kickboxer
- Jim Donlevy – University of Alberta Golden Bears football coach, and Western Hockey League educational consultant
- Paul Graham – vice-president and executive producer of The Sports Network
- Hank Ilesic – Football player for Edmonton Eskimos and seven-time Grey Cup winner
- Gene Kiniski – Football player for the Edmonton Eskimos and professional wrestler
- Marcel Lambert – Politician and speaker of the House of Commons of Canada
- Thomas Lukaszuk – Politician and member of the Legislative Assembly of Alberta
- Gene Principe – Reporter for Sportsnet
- Bill Smith – Mayor of Edmonton and football player for the Edmonton Eskimos
- Allan Wachowich – Chief Justice of the Court of Queen's Bench of Alberta

== See also ==
- Edmonton Catholic School District
- Schools in Alberta
