= Michel Bourgeau =

Canadian gridiron football player (born 1960)

Profile
- Position: Defensive tackle

Personal information
- Born: June 28, 1960 (age 66); Montreal, Quebec, Canada
- Listed height: 6 ft 5 in (1.96 m)
- Listed weight: 275 lb (125 kg)

Career information
- College: Boise State University
- NFL draft: 1984: 11th round, 291st overall pick
- CFL draft: 1984: 5th overall pick

Career history
- 1984–1988: Ottawa Rough Riders
- 1989–1993: Edmonton Eskimos

Awards and highlights
- Grey Cup champion (1993); NCAA Division I-AA national champion (1980)

Michel Bourgeau (born June 28, 1960) is a Canadian former professional football defensive lineman who played ten seasons in the Canadian Football League (CFL) for the Ottawa Rough Riders and Edmonton Eskimos.

Born in Montreal, Quebec, Bourgeau played college football in the western United States at Boise State University (1980–1983). In his freshman year, the Broncos won the Big Sky title and the Division I-AA national championship. He was selected in the eleventh round of the 1984 NFL draft by the New Orleans Saints.

Bourgeau was also selected in the 1984 CFL draft, fifth in the territorial exemption portion, by Ottawa, and played with the Rough Riders for five seasons. He spent his last five seasons in Edmonton and retired after the 1993 season, after winning the Grey Cup.
