= Joe Adams (quarterback) =

American gridiron football player (born 1958)

No. 7, 5
- Position: Quarterback

Personal information
- Born: April 5, 1958 (age 68); Gulfport, Mississippi, U.S.
- Listed height: 6 ft 3 in (1.91 m)
- Listed weight: 190 lb (86 kg)

Career information
- High school: Gulfport East (Mississippi)
- College: Tennessee State (1977–1980)
- NFL draft: 1981: 12th round, 322nd overall pick

Career history
- Winnipeg Blue Bombers (1981)*; Saskatchewan Roughriders (1982–1983); Toronto Argonauts (1983); Ottawa Rough Riders (1984)
- * Offseason or practice squad member only

Awards and highlights
- Grey Cup champion (1983); Black college national champion (1979)

Joe "747" Adams (born April 5, 1958) is an American former football player. A quarterback, he played college football at Tennessee State University, where he set the National Collegiate Athletic Association (NCAA) record for career touchdown passes and was a Black college national champion. He was selected by the San Francisco 49ers of the National Football League (NFL) in the 12th round of the 1981 NFL draft, but never signed with them. Adams then played in the Canadian Football League (CFL) from 1982 to 1984 with the Saskatchewan Roughriders, Toronto Argonauts, and Ottawa Rough Riders. He threw for over 3,000 yards as the Roughriders' starting quarterback in 1982 but was released in 1983 after a poor start to the season. He spent the rest of the 1983 season with the Toronto Argonauts, winning the 71st Grey Cup as the third-string quarterback. Adams finished his CFL career with the Ottawa Rough Riders in 1984. He was inducted into the Black College Football Hall of Fame in 2024. Adams was nicknamed "747", in reference to the Boeing 747 aircraft, due to his "rocket" strong arm.

== Early life ==
Joe Adams was born on April 5, 1958, in Gulfport, Mississippi. He played high school football at Gulfport East High School. He also participated in basketball and track in high school. Tennessee State Tigers and NFL quarterback Joe Gilliam was one of Adams' "idols" in high school. Adams wrote to Tennessee State head coach John Merritt, who then sent Adams several newspaper articles about Gilliam.

== College career ==
Adams originally signed a letter of intent to play college football for the Jackson State Tigers of Jackson State University but later switched to Tennessee State University. Adams stated that he switched schools because Jackson State hired a new head coach who instituted an offense where Adams would not be able to throw as much. He was a four-year letterman for Tennessee State from 1977 to 1980. He played in five games as a true freshman in 1977 after starting quarterback Eugene Lucas suffered an injury, completing 74 of 146 passes (50.7%) for 1,001 yards, 12 touchdowns, and six interceptions while also scoring one rushing touchdown. On October 22, 1977, he completed 30 of 48 passes for 342 yards and four touchdowns in a 31–28 loss to undefeated national champion Florida A&M. His 30 completions broke the single-game school record previously held by his high school idol Joe Gilliam. During his freshman season, there was dispute over whether Adams was eligible for play for Tennessee State. Jackson State athletic director Walter Reed said that Adams was never released from his letter of intent. However, Tennessee State athletic director Samuel Whitmon claimed that Reed had previously released Adams from his letter of intent in mid September 1977. In October 1978, a court granted Adams a temporary restraining order that prevented him from being declared ineligible without a court hearing. The vice president of the Collegiate Commissioners Association later stated that a "national letter-of-intent is a gentleman's agreement between school's and conferences not to tamper with players who have signed those letters." Jackson State athletic director Reed said it is "mainly a matter of ethics. If they (Tennessee State) decide to play Adams, there's really nothing we can do about it."

Going into the 1978 season, Adams competed for the starting quarterback job with Lucas, Georgia Tech transfer Mike Jolly, and Brian Ransom. Adams won the job. On October 21, 1978, he helped the Tigers end Florida A&M's 17-game winning streak. He completed 13 of 14 passes for 161 yards and three touchdowns as Tennessee State won by a score of 24–21. During the 1978 season, he completed 54.7% of his passes for a school-record 2,328 yards. His 13.8 completions per game was the 13th best in NCAA Division I-A that year while his 190.7 total offensive yards per game was 16th best. The Tigers finished the season with an 8–3 record. Adams was named a Black college football All-American by the New Pittsburgh Courier.

In 1979, Adams set school single-season records in passing yards and passing touchdowns while finishing ninth in the country in total offense per game with 203.5 yards. In the final game of the season, Tennessee State scored the most points of any Division I-A team that year, defeating Cal Poly Pomona by a margin of 71–3. The Tigers went 8–3 and were named Black college football national champions. Sheridan Broadcasting named Adams both a first-team Black college football All-American and the Black college football Offensive Player of the Year.

Adams led Tennessee State to a 9–1 record his senior year in 1980 while throwing for a school single-season record 30 touchdowns, earning Sheridan Broadcasting first-team Black college football All-American and Offensive Player of the Year honors once again. Adams majored in communications at Tennessee State. He had a 25–7 record as a starter in college, and set school records with 8,653 career passing yards, 81 career touchdown passes, and a 54.9 completion percentage. His career passing touchdown total was also an NCAA record while his passing yard total was second most all-time. His school record for career passing yards was not broken until 2014, when Mike German threw for 11 more yards. As of 2023, Adams still owned Tennessee State's career passing touchdown and single-season passing touchdown records.

== Professional career ==
=== 1981 ===
After his senior year, Adams was selected to play in the Blue–Gray Football Classic as part of the Gray team. During the game, he completed only eight of 22 passes for 105 yards and two interceptions as the Gray team lost 24–23. Adam also played the second half of the Hula Bowl as part of the East team, completing seven of 18 passes for 104 yards as the East lost 24–17 to the West.

Adams expressed disappointment after being passed over in the first six rounds of the 1981 NFL draft on April 28. On the next day, a different "Joe Adams", a guard from Nebraska, was selected by the St. Louis Cardinals at the beginning of the 12th round. Joe "747" Adams said "I was beginning to feel a little panic. I was walking up and down the halls and people were coming up and talking to me, trying to help me relax ... but it didn't help much." Later in the same round, Adams was selected by the San Francisco 49ers with the 322nd overall pick. He was the 18th, and final, quarterback chosen in the draft. Adams was disappointed at his low draft selection, stating "Yes, I felt sure I'd go much higher." It was anticipated that he would compete with Steve DeBerg, Gary Huff, and Joe Montana for a spot on the 49ers' roster. Adams reported to 49ers minicamp in May and training camp in July. However, in July, San Francisco traded for quarterback Guy Benjamin so the 49ers chose not to sign Adams.

On July 22, 1981, Adams was signed to a 14-day trial by the Winnipeg Blue Bombers of the Canadian Football League (CFL) behind starter Dieter Brock and backup Mark Jackson. Adams did not dress for any games during his stint with Winnipeg.

=== 1982 ===
Adams signed a three-year contract with the CFL's Saskatchewan Roughriders on April 27, 1982. During the preseason, he competed with former Tennessee Volunteers quarterback Steve Alatorre for the team's second-string quarterback spot. On June 22, Adams threw for three touchdowns during a preseason game against the BC Lions, which solidified his spot as the No. 2 quarterback. Adams began the 1982 CFL season as the backup to starter John Hufnagel while Alatorre was traded to the Montreal Concordes. On July 24 against the Calgary Stampeders, Adams relieved Hufnagel with ten minutes left in the game. With the Roughriders down 19–10, Adams led the team on two touchdown drives while completing four of five passes for 55 yards, including a game-clinching 12-yard touchdown throw. Saskatchewan won 25–19. Adams took over as Saskatchewan's starter a few weeks later on August 12 against the Ottawa Rough Riders, and threw for 355 yards in a 26–19 victory. His 355 yards were the most in a first start in franchise history. It was broken by Cody Fajardo's 360 yards in 2019. Adams dressed in 16 games overall for Saskatchewan during the 1982 season, completing 245 of 454 passes (54%) for 3,312 yards, 19 touchdowns, and 16 interceptions while also rushing 22 times for 148 yards and two touchdowns. The Roughriders finished the year with a 6–9–1 record. Adams was named the team's rookie of the year.

=== 1983 ===
Adams began the 1983 season as Saskatchewan's starter, dressing in six games while completing 104 of 208 passes (50%) for 1,529 yards, eight touchdowns, and six interceptions while also scoring one rushing touchdown. After beginning the year with a 1–5 record, he was traded to the Toronto Argonauts for future considerations on August 23, 1983. Roughriders head coach Joe Faragalli was also fired. Adams dressed, but did not play, in one game for the Argonauts in 1983 as the third-string quarterback behind Condredge Holloway and Joe Barnes. Adams ran Toronto's scout team during the 1983 season. On November 27, 1983, the Argonauts won the 71st Grey Cup against the BC Lions by a score of 18–17.

=== 1984 ===
In January 1984, it was reported that Adams was trying to get out of his third-year option with the Argonauts to try and play in the United States Football League (USFL). Toronto granted him his release and he later tried out at a USFL camp in Maryland. A month into the 1984 CFL season, Adams signed with the Ottawa Rough Riders. He made his first start for Ottawa on August 17 after J. C. Watts was sidelined due to turf toe. During the game, Adams threw two interceptions as the Rough Riders lost 46–17. He dressed in seven games overall during the 1984 season, completing 42 of 78 passes (53.8%) for 501 yards, four touchdowns, and eight interceptions.

== Legacy and later life ==
Adams was nicknamed "747", in reference to the Boeing 747 aircraft, due to his "rocket" strong arm. He received the nickname from Tennessee State sports information director Kindell Stephens. In reference to his nickname, Adams later stated "I didn't like it at first. Kindell said I had to have a nickname. Look at what Too Tall did for Jones. They called me 747 because I put it in the air." In 2020, the Regina Leader-Post ranked Adams as the third-best quarterback in Roughriders history in terms of "arm talent" behind Henry Burris (2) and Michael Bishop (1). Adams was a finalist for the Black College Football Hall of Fame each year from 2016 to 2023. He was inducted as part of the class of 2024.

As of 2023, Adams was living in Los Angeles.
