= Paul Graham (television producer) =

Canadian television producer (born 1959)

- Born: June 9, 1959 (age 67); Edmonton, Alberta, Canada
- Education: Northern Alberta Institute of Technology
- Occupation: Television producer
- Years active: 1979–2025
- Known for: The Sports Network; Canadian Football Network; CBC Sports
- Notable work: Canadian Football League; Grey Cup; World Juniors; Hockey Night in Canada
- Awards: Hugh Campbell Distinguished Leadership Award (2017); Canadian Football Hall of Fame (2018); IIHF Media Award (2025)

Paul Graham (born June 9, 1959) is a Canadian television producer. As vice-president and executive producer of The Sports Network from 2010 to 2025, he oversaw the long-term development strategy for live event production while negotiating broadcast agreements. Since 2009, he produced all Canadian Football League (CFL) games and the Grey Cup, and implemented new camera angles, microphones, and slow motion for instant replays. He advocated expanded coverage of International Ice Hockey Federation events, envisioning growth in interest and viewer ratings, leading to broadcasts for all games of the IIHF World Junior Championship.

Graduating from Northern Alberta Institute of Technology, he worked the Edmonton Oilers' first National Hockey League season. His early CFL work began with CBC Sports in 1980, and continued with the newly established Canadian Football Network in 1987. He was a senior producer of Hockey Night in Canada from 1998 to 2009, and produced coverage of multiple other sports including the Winter Olympic Games. His honours include the Hugh Campbell Distinguished Leadership Award, induction into the media section of the Canadian Football Hall of Fame, the IIHF Media Award, Canadian Screen Awards, and Gemini Awards.

== Early life and education ==
Graham was born on June 9, 1959, at the Royal Alexandra Hospital in Edmonton, Alberta. He grew up in the Westwood neighbourhood, across the road from Westwood Arena where he learned to skate. As a child, he was a newspaper carrier for the Edmonton Journal, and organized ball hockey and football games among friends. He was a regular member of the Knothole Gang at Clarke Stadium, watching the Edmonton Eskimos for 25 cents per game. He was also a ball boy for the Edmonton Wildcats, earning CA$2 per week at their practices, and travelled with the team to road games in Calgary and Regina.

Attending St. Joseph High School, Graham played football as a teammate of future professional player Hank Ilesic. Graham graduated from Northern Alberta Institute of Technology (NAIT) with a Bachelor of Arts degree in Radio and Television Arts in 1979. He played intramural flag football while at NAIT, and credited the school for giving him the confidence to work in television.

== Television career ==
=== Early career in Western Canada ===
Graham was a producer and director for NAIT Ooks men's ice hockey games on community television, when offered a job with Hockey Night in Canada broadcasting games for the Edmonton Oilers during their first National Hockey League (NHL) season. He initially declined, then was invited to Northlands Coliseum during a meal break for a tutorial on graphics for research and statistics, and was hired for the 1979–80 NHL season. In 1980, he began working for CBC Sports as a sideline spotter for Canadian Football League (CFL) games in Edmonton.

Subsequently working for CITV-DT (later Canwest Global) and CTV Television Network, Graham oversaw research, statistics, and graphics. With CITV-DT, he was promoted to associate producer, then television producer. He chose production since he enjoyed organizing events. He also worked in concert production, and moving sets and mopping floors for Second City Television in Edmonton, while working his way up to being a producer.

=== Middle career and move eastward ===
Moving eastward in 1987, Graham joined the newly established Canadian Football Network which lasted four seasons. He produced 40 CFL games per season, from the on-site production truck, including the 75th Grey Cup hosted in Vancouver in 1987. He also did film preservation work on several decades of videos used to profile the game's hall of fame inductees.

Graham's first International Ice Hockey Federation (IIHF) tournament was the inaugural Women's World Championship, hosted in Ottawa in 1990. Joining The Sports Network (TSN) in 1991, he produced coverage of the NHL, National Basketball Association, and Canadian Hockey League, including ten Memorial Cups. His work also included the Winter Olympic Games in 1988, and women's ice hockey at the 1998 Winter Olympics.

Graham produced the IIHF World Junior Championship coverage annually since 1992, after reaching a broadcast agreement with then Hockey Canada vice-president Bob Nicholson. TSN initially covered only the Team Canada games, then added all games in Team Canada's pool. At the 1992 event, TSN had only five cameras, and broadcast only five games to Canada.

Overseeing TSN's coverage of the inaugural 1997 Winter X Games, Graham felt that despite low ratings at the time, "extreme sport is a statement", that it "[rebelled] against the sporting status quo", and "it's new and fresh and young".

Graham became the senior producer of Hockey Night in Canada in 1998, and produced four Stanley Cup Finals, and four NHL All-Star Games. He also produced coverage of the Pan American Games in 1999 and 2003. In 2003, he became a senior producer for Raptors NBA TV.

=== TSN vice-president and executive producer ===
Graham returned to TSN in 2009, then was vice-president and executive producer of live-event production from 2010 until retiring in 2025. He oversaw the long-term development strategy and production for live events, and production of the 2010 Winter Olympics coverage from Whistler Blackcomb as a leading member of Canada's Olympic Broadcast Media Consortium.

When losing broadcasting rights to NHL games, Graham led a TSN strategy to cover multiple other platforms including college football, March Madness, The Brier, and the US Open Tennis Championships. In January 2015, TSN had the second most watched month in its history at the time. Graham built relationships with various organizations, leagues and teams, while arranging broadcast agreements and production.

==== Canadian football ====
Since TSN became the CFL's exclusive broadcast partner in 2009, Graham produced coverage for all regular season and playoffs games, and the Grey Cup. Expanded coverage included Thursday Night Football games, with the 100th Grey Cup in Toronto as one of his "proudest achievements". He implemented behind-the-scenes access for viewers, which included new camera angles, on-field cameras and microphones. Coverage grew to ninety games annually by the 2018 CFL season, using 14 cameras per regular season broadcast. During that year's Grey Cup, his broadcast crew numbered 200 people, utilized 40 cameras including super slow motion cameras for instant replays, and a camera mounted on the referee.

In 2019, Graham interviewed with the Edmonton Eskimos for the vacant president and CEO position. The team were reportedly close to hiring him, but no financial agreement was reached. He interviewed again for the same vacancy in 2021, but remained with TSN.

==== International ice hockey ====
Graham expanded coverage of the World Junior Championship and the Ice Hockey World Championships to include more games, and began coverage for the Women's World Championship, and the under-18 men's and under-18 women's championships. Bringing more international hockey to North American television, Graham produced coverage of the Spengler Cup and the Champions Hockey League. By the 2015 IIHF World Championship, TSN televised 58 of 64 games, which Graham felt would create more North American interest comparable to European enthusiasm for the event. When TSN first televised the Hlinka Gretzky Cup in 2018, he envisioned a marketable hockey event in August despite low in-person attendance at the time. He felt that by agreeing to televise 2019 event in Europe was part of a process of educating Canadians about the event.

In a 2018 interview, Graham considered the World Juniors his "baby". Due to his "passion and belief" in the event, TSN gradually expanded coverage to include all games of the tournament, when he insisted on "a big game feel". As of the 2021 Championships, all pre-tournament and in-tournament games were broadcast. When the IIHF began the tournament on Christmas Day, he anticipated a boost in viewer ratings. His final live event with TSN was the 2025 Championships, which exceeded 84 broadcast hours, and first made use of drones for new camera angles. Graham stated in 2025, "one of the things I'm proudest of is that Juniors are not just big in Canada", since multiple countries now access full coverage of the event.

== Honours and awards ==
In 2017, Graham received the Hugh Campbell Distinguished Leadership Award for "leadership and significant contributions" to the CFL. In 2018, he was inducted into the media section of the Canadian Football Hall of Fame. He received the IIHF Media Award during the 2025 IIHF World Championship in Sweden, for contributions to televising international ice hockey. Other awards during his career include Canadian Screen Awards, a CANPRO Award, and Gemini Awards.
