= Jacquay Nunnally =

American football player (born 1978)

No. 25
- Position: Wide receiver

Personal information
- Born: January 14, 1978 (age 48); Miami, Florida, U.S.
- Listed height: 5 ft 10 in (1.78 m)
- Listed weight: 200 lb (91 kg)

Career information
- High school: Edison (Miami)
- College: Florida A&M (1996–2000)
- NFL draft: 2001: undrafted

Career history
- Tampa Bay Buccaneers (2001)*; Toronto Argonauts (2001)
- * Offseason or practice squad member only

Awards and highlights
- Black college national champion (1998); 4× First-team All-MEAC (1997–2000)

Jacquay Nunnally (born January 14, 1978) is an American former football wide receiver. He played college football for the Florida A&M Rattlers and professionally for the Toronto Argonauts of the Canadian Football League (CFL). He was inducted into the Black College Football Hall of Fame in 2025.

== Early life ==
Jacquay Nunnally was born on January 14, 1978, in Miami, Florida. He attended Miami Edison Senior High School.

== College career ==
Nunnally played college football for the Florida A&M Rattlers of Florida A&M University from 1997 to 2000, earning first-team All-Mid-Eastern Athletic Conference (MEAC) honors all four seasons. He redshirted in 1996. He set an NCAA Division I-AA freshman record with 284 receiving yards on October 11, 1997, against North Carolina A&T. He earned MEAC Rookie of the Year honors for the 1997 season. Nunnally was the Black College Football Player of the Year in both 1998 and 2000. He helped the Rattlers advance to the Division I-AA playoffs each year from 1997 to 2000. The 1998 Rattlers were Black college national champions. Nunnally finished his college career with 317 receptions for 4,239 yards and 38 touchdowns. Nunnally's 317 receptions set the Division I-AA career record.

Nunnally was inducted into the Florida A&M Sports Hall of Fame in 2009, the MEAC Hall of Fame in 2010, and the Black College Football Hall of Fame in 2025.

== Professional career ==
After going undrafted in the 2001 NFL draft, Nunnally signed with the Tampa Bay Buccaneers on April 23, 2001. He was later released on August 27, 2001.

Nunnally signed with the Toronto Argonauts of the Canadian Football League on September 16, 2001. He played in one game for the Argonauts, recording one reception for nine yards, one kickoff return for 13 yards, and one punt return for four yards, before being released on November 19, 2001.

== Personal life ==
Nunnally later became a high school football coach in Florida. His uncle, Darrell Pitts, also played football at Florida A&M.
