= Paul Pearson (Canadian football) =

Canadian gridiron football player (born 1957)

Profile
- Position: Slotback

Personal information
- Born: June 15, 1957 (age 69); Campbell River, British Columbia, Canada

Career information
- College: University of British Columbia

Career history
- 1978: Calgary Stampeders
- 1979: Saskatchewan Roughriders
- 1979–1987: Toronto Argonauts

Awards and highlights
- Grey Cup champion (1983); CFL East All-Star (1984)

Paul Pearson (born June 15, 1957) is a former slotback who played ten seasons in the Canadian Football League (CFL), mainly for the Toronto Argonauts. His two clutch receptions on the game-winning drive played a key part in the Argos' 1983 Grey Cup victory.

Perason played college football for the College of the Siskiyous Eagles and university football for the UBC Thunderbirds.
