= Carl Brazley =

American gridiron football player (born 1957)

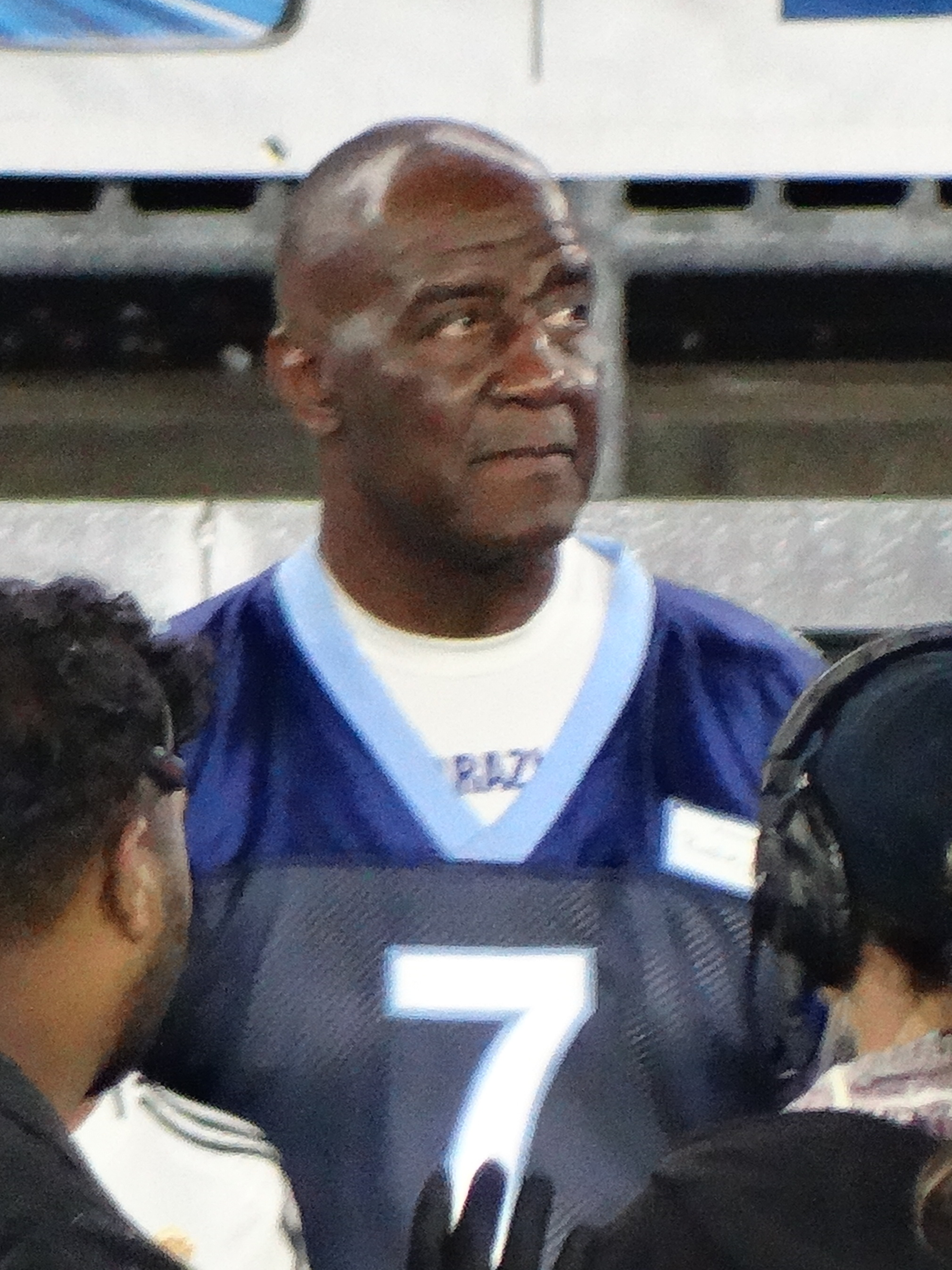
- Brazley in 2026

Personal information
- Born: September 5, 1957 (age 69); Louisville, Kentucky, U.S.
- Listed height: 6 ft 0 in (1.83 m)
- Listed weight: 180 lb (82 kg)

Career information
- Position: Defensive back (No. 7)
- High school: Seneca (Louisville)
- College: Western Kentucky
- NFL draft: 1980: undrafted

Career history
- Montreal Alouettes (1980–1981); Ottawa Rough Riders (1981–1982); Toronto Argonauts (1983–1986); San Diego Chargers (1987); Toronto Argonauts (1988–1992)

Awards and highlights
- 2× Grey Cup champion (1983, 1991); 5× CFL All-Star (1982–1986)
- Stats at Pro Football Reference

Carl Eugene Brazley (born September 5, 1957) is an American former professional football player in the Canadian Football League (CFL) for thirteen years. Brazley played defensive back for the Montreal Alouettes, Ottawa Rough Riders and Toronto Argonauts from 1980 to 1992. He was a CFL All-Star in 1983, the same season he won the Grey Cup with the Argonauts. Brazley also played for the San Diego Chargers as a replacement player in 1987. He played college football at Western Kentucky University. He ended his 13-year career in 1993, playing with the Toronto Argonauts.
