= Jan Carinci =

Gridiron football player (born 1959)

Profile
- Position: Slotback

Personal information
- Born: February 2, 1959 (age 67); London, England

Career information
- College: Maryland

Career history
- 1981–1985: Toronto Argonauts
- 1986–1990: British Columbia Lions

Awards and highlights
- Grey Cup champion (1983)

Jan Carinci (born February 2, 1959) is a former slotback who played ten seasons in the Canadian Football League (CFL), evenly split between the Toronto Argonauts and the BC Lions. He was a part of the Argonauts 1983 Grey Cup victory.

He resides with his family in Moncton, New Brunswick, and writes a sports column for the Times & Transcript newspaper.
