= Roscoe Nance =

American sportswriter (1948–2020)

- Born: December 8, 1948; Enterprise, Alabama, U.S.
- Died: January 9, 2020 (aged 71); Herndon, Virginia, U.S.
- Occupation: Sportswriter

Roscoe Nance (December 8, 1948 – January 9, 2020) was an American sportswriter. He was a reporter for the Clarion Ledger.
