= Hank Ilesic =

Canadian football player (born 1959)

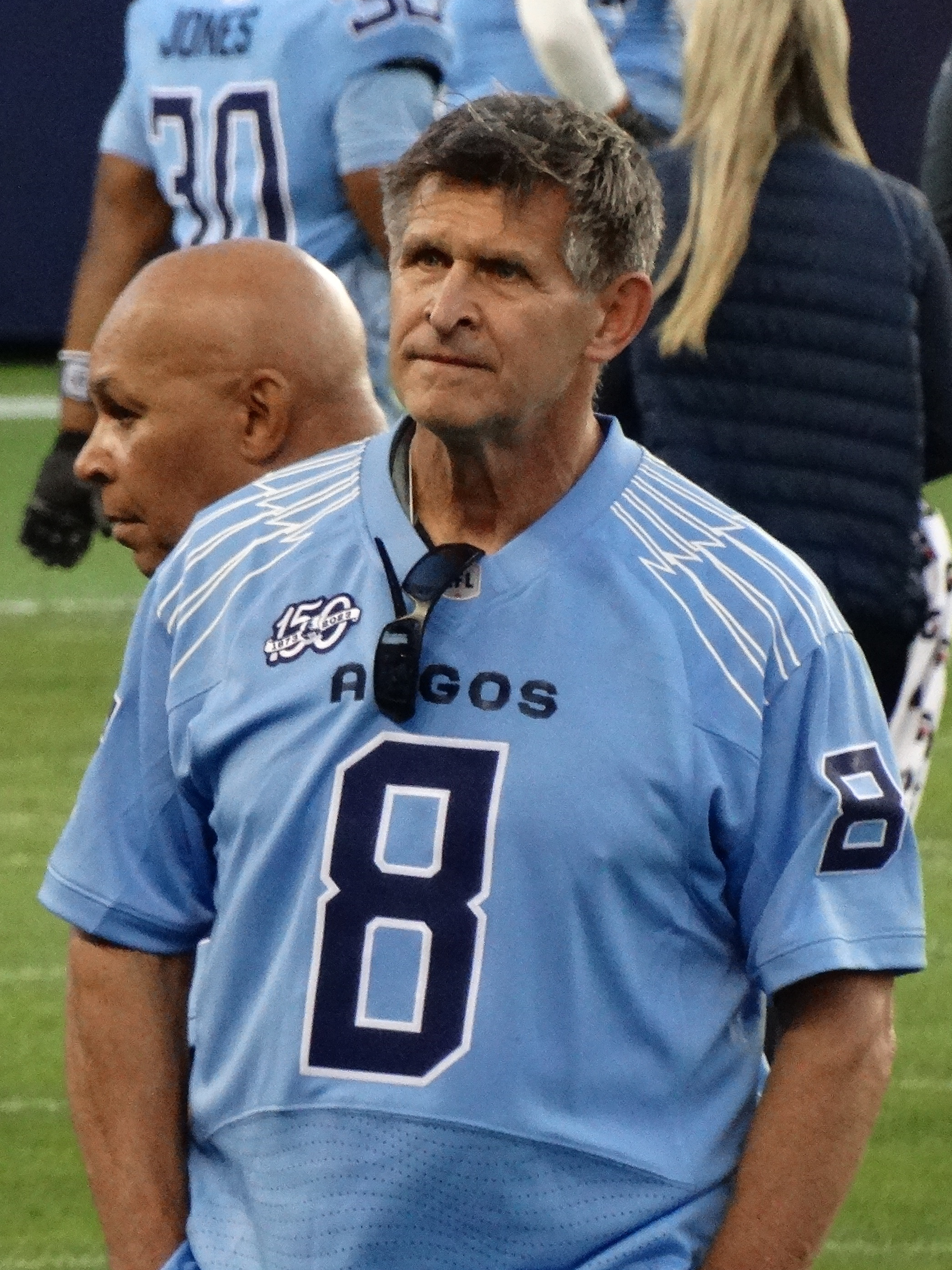
- Ilesic in 2023

No. 8
- Positions: Punter, Placekicker

Personal information
- Born: September 7, 1959 (age 67); Edmonton, Alberta, Canada
- Listed height: 6 ft 1 in (1.85 m)
- Listed weight: 210 lb (95 kg)

Career information
- High school: St. Joseph (Edmonton)

Career history
- 1977–1982: Edmonton Eskimos
- 1983–1989: Toronto Argonauts
- 1989: San Diego Chargers
- 1990: Los Angeles Rams*
- 1990–1993: Toronto Argonauts
- 1994–1995: Hamilton Tiger-Cats
- 1998: BC Lions
- 2001: Edmonton Eskimos
- 2005: Ottawa Renegades*
- * Offseason or practice squad member only

Awards and highlights
- 7× Grey Cup champion (1978–1983, 1991); 2× CFL All-Star (1991, 1992); 2× CFL East All-Star (1991, 1992); 2× CFL West All-Star (1980, 1981)
- Stats at Pro Football Reference
- Canadian Football Hall of Fame (Class of 2018)

Henry Ilesic (born September 7, 1959) is a Canadian former professional football player who was a punter in the Canadian Football League (CFL). He also handled place kicking and kickoffs. He was twice an all-star punter and played in the CFL for 19 seasons. He played on seven Grey Cup–winning teams, and retired in 2001. He remains third overall for Most Punting Yards, All-Time Regular Season. He played one season in the National Football League (NFL).

== Professional career ==
Ilesic, at 6 feet 1 inch and 210 pounds, went straight from St. Joseph's High School to the CFL, starring with his hometown Edmonton Eskimos at age 17 in 1977. At St. Joseph, he was a football teammate of fellow Hall of Fame inductee Paul Graham.

Ilesic's punting was an essential part of the Eskimos' record-setting five Grey Cup dynasty. He kicked for Edmonton until joining the Toronto Argonauts in 1983, where he won another Grey Cup. He won the record for most punting yards in the regular season in 1986. He remained there until 1993, then played for the Hamilton Tiger-Cats until 1995. Ilesic came out of retirement to punt for the B.C. Lions in 1998, playing only three games. Ilesic signed with the Eskimos again in 2001 and to the Ottawa Renegades practice squad in 2005, but did not play in any games in either stint.

Ilesic also punted in 1989 for the NFL's San Diego Chargers, punting 76 times in 14 games for 3049 yards, averaging 40.1 yards a punt. He signed with the Los Angeles Rams in 1990, but did not play.

Ilesic is the CFL's third all-time leading punter in yardage with 91,753 yards. His 8,004 yards in 1986 is the second most for a season in league history. He was on a CFL record seven Grey Cup-winning teams and is eighth all-time in CFL history for regular-season games played with 259. His 19 seasons played ranks his tied for fourth all-time. His is also fifth all-time for scoring single points in the regular season with 185, many coming on his exceptionally long kick-offs. In 2018 he was inducted into Canadian Football Hall of Fame.

Unlike most modern-day placekickers, Ilesic kicked with the front of his toe (called kicking "straight-on") and not the side (called the "soccer-style").
