= 71st Grey Cup =

1983 Canadian Football championship game

Toronto Argonauts	BC Lions
(12–4)	(11–5)
18	17
Head coach: Bob O'Billovich	Head coach: Don Matthews
	1	2	3	4	Total
Toronto Argonauts	0	7	2	9	18
BC Lions	7	10	0	0	17
- Date: November 27, 1983
- Stadium: BC Place Stadium
- Location: Vancouver
- Most Valuable Player: Offence: Joe Barnes, QB (Argonauts); Defence: Carl Brazley, DB (Argonauts)
- Most Valuable Canadian: Rick Klassen, DT (Lions)
- National anthem: Carroll Baker
- Referee: Lorne Woods
- Attendance: 59,345

Broadcasters
- Network: CBC, CTV, SRC
- Announcers: First Half: Pat Marsden, Frank Rigney, Leif Pettersen. Second Half: Don Wittman, Leo Cahill, Ron Lancaster. SRC: N/A.
- Ratings: 8,118,000

The 71st Grey Cup was the 1983 Canadian Football League championship game played at BC Place Stadium in Vancouver between the Toronto Argonauts and hometown BC Lions. The Argos narrowly defeated the Lions 18–17, claiming their first Grey Cup victory in 31 years.

== Game summary ==
Toronto Argonauts (18) - TDs, Jan Carinci, Cedric Minter; FGs, Hank Ilesic; cons., Ilesic; singles, Ilesic (2).

BC Lions (17) - TDs, Mervyn Fernandez, John Henry White; FGs, Lui Passaglia; cons., Passaglia (2).

The 1983 Grey Cup marked the first championship game where weather was not a deciding factor, as the final was held indoors for the first time at the new BC Place Stadium in Vancouver, which opened earlier in the year.

Most notably, however, 1983 marked the end of the longest championship drought in the history of Canadian football's most successful team. The Toronto Argonauts, winners of a record 10 Grey Cups, had not sipped from the silver chalice since 1952.

The Argos faced a difficult task. Not only did the BC Lions have a noisy, partisan crowd behind them, but Toronto's star quarterback Condredge Holloway was battling the flu. Holloway did manage, however, to complete a 14-yard touchdown toss to Jan Carinci in the second quarter to put the Double Blue on the board.

Trailing 17-7, Toronto coach Bob O'Billovich elected to go with Joe Barnes at pivot in the second half. Slowly Barnes got the Argo offence going, but his efforts bore little fruit as Hank Ilesic missed three consecutive field goals. Two were good for singles, however, allowing Toronto to cut its deficit to eight points.

When Ilesic finally split the uprights on a 43-yard attempt in the fourth quarter, it put the Argos within striking distance. Then, with four minutes remaining, Barnes executed one of the most important drives in Argonaut history. He hit Paul Pearson with a pass at the BC 45, but the ball was pried loose and popped into the air. In a most fortuitous return of the famed Argo Bounce, the ball miraculously landed in the hands of receiver Emanuel Tolbert, allowing the Boatmen to retain possession and continue their drive.

Barnes went to work again, completing a pass to Tolbert at the BC 25 and another to Pearson on the three. With 2:44 left in regulation, Barnes flipped the ball to a wide-open Cedric Minter in the end zone, giving the Argos their first lead of the game. The subsequent two-point convert attempt fell incomplete.

Leading by one, Toronto forced BC to punt on its next possession, allowing the Argos to run out most of the clock. BC's Roy Dewalt had one last chance to throw a Hail Mary pass with one second remaining, but his prayer wasn't answered and long-suffering Argonaut fans took to the streets in jubilation.

BC scored its points on touchdown passes by Dewalt to Mervyn Fernandez and John Henry White. Lui Passaglia also kicked a 31-yard field goal.

== Trivia ==
- Hank Ilesic, who came directly from high school to the CFL, won his sixth consecutive Grey Cup and played in his seventh consecutive Grey Cup game, all in his first seven years in the league (he was with the Eskimos for all of his Grey Cup appearances prior to this one, his first with the Argos).
- The 1983 game marked the first occasion that the Grey Cup was played indoors, and was the first championship game played at the newly opened BC Place Stadium; it was also the first Grey Cup game to be played with the 20-yard endzones (shorter than the then-standard 25 yards, BC Place was the first stadium in the CFL to have 20-yard endzones); the shorter endzone size would become the league standard three years later.
- This was the first Grey Cup game held in Western Canada since 1975 at McMahon Stadium in Calgary; from 1976 to 1982, the game was held in alternating years in either Toronto or Montreal.
- The Argonaut defence, led by CB Carl Brazley and DE Rick Mohr, held the Lions scoreless for the entire second half.

== 1983 CFL Playoffs ==
=== West Division ===
- Semi-final (November 13 @ Winnipeg, Manitoba) Winnipeg Blue Bombers 49-22 Edmonton Eskimos
- Final (November 20 @ Vancouver, British Columbia) BC Lions 39-21 Winnipeg Blue Bombers

=== East Division ===
- Semi-final (November 13 @ Ottawa, Ontario) Hamilton Tiger-Cats 33-31 Ottawa Rough Riders
- Final (November 20 @ Toronto, Ontario) Toronto Argonauts 41-36 Hamilton Tiger-Cats
