= Lewis Walker (Canadian football) =

American football player (born 1958)

No. 6
- Position: Running back

Personal information
- Born: December 12, 1958 (age 67); Los Angeles, California, U.S.
- Listed height: 6 ft 0 in (1.83 m)
- Listed weight: 185 lb (84 kg)

Career information
- High school: Palmdale (Palmdale, California)
- College: Utah
- NFL draft: 1980: 10th round, 268th overall pick

Career history
- Washington Redskins (1980); Hamilton Tiger-Cats (1982)*; Calgary Stampeders (1984–1985)
- * Offseason or practice squad member only

Lewis T. Walker (born December 12, 1958) is an American former professional football running back who played for the Calgary Stampeders of the Canadian Football League (CFL). He played college football at Utah, and was selected by the Washington Redskins in the tenth round of the 1980 NFL draft.

== Early life ==
Lewis T. Walker was born on December 12, 1958, in Los Angeles, California. He attended Palmdale High School in Palmdale, California.

== College career ==
Walker first played college football at Antelope Valley College from 1976 to 1977. He then transferred to the University of Utah, where he was a two-year letterman for the Utah Utes from 1978 to 1979. He rushed 21 times for 123 yards in 1978. As a senior in 1979, Walker totaled 93 rushing attempts for 714 yards and seven touchdowns, five receptions for 27 yards and one touchdown, 16 kick returns for 358 yards, and 13 punt returns for 107 yards. His 7.7 yards per attempt was the most in the Western Athletic Conference that season.

== Professional career ==
Walker was selected by the Washington Redskins in the tenth round, with the 268th overall pick, of the 1980 NFL draft. He was placed on injured reserve on July 25, 1980, where he spent the entire 1980 NFL season. He was waived on August 18, 1981.

Walker signed with the Hamilton Tiger-Cats of the Canadian Football League (CFL) on April 1, 1982. He was released in June 1982 before the start of the 1982 CFL season.

Walker dressed in 13 games for the CFL's Calgary Stampeders in 1984. He led the team in both rushing yards and receiving yards, rushing 139 times for 732 yards and two touchdowns while also catching 55 passes for 595 yards and one touchdown. He dressed in six games during the 1985 season, recording 39 carries for 139 yards and 29 receptions for 268 yards and one touchdown. In late August 1985, Walker pleaded not guilty to exposing himself in public. He was released by the Stampeders less than 24 hours later on August 30, 1985.
