= 1984 Edmonton Eskimos season =

- General manager: Norm Kimball
- Head coach: Jackie Parker
- Home stadium: Commonwealth Stadium

Results
- Record: 9–7
- Division place: 3rd, West
- Playoffs: Lost West Semi-Final

The 1984 Edmonton Eskimos finished in third place in the West Division with a 9–7 record.

The Eskimos offense had 484 points for, while the defense had 498 points allowed. In 1984, Matt Dunigan captured the Molson Toughest Yard Award given to the player that exemplified heart, desire, determination, toughness, and the will to win by going the extra yard.

== Regular season ==
=== Standings ===
West Division
| Pos | Team | Pld | W | L | T | PF | PA | PD | Pts |
|---|---|---|---|---|---|---|---|---|---|
| 1 | BC Lions (C, Q) | 16 | 12 | 3 | 1 | 445 | 281 | +164 | 25 |
| 2 | Winnipeg Blue Bombers (Q) | 16 | 11 | 4 | 1 | 523 | 309 | +214 | 23 |
| 3 | Edmonton Eskimos (Q) | 16 | 9 | 7 | 0 | 464 | 443 | +21 | 18 |
| 4 | Saskatchewan Roughriders | 16 | 6 | 9 | 1 | 348 | 479 | −131 | 13 |
| 5 | Calgary Stampeders | 16 | 6 | 10 | 0 | 314 | 425 | −111 | 12 |

Source: "CFL.ca - Official Site of the Canadian Football League". Archived from the original on 2009-10-20.
(C) First round bye; (Q) Qualified for playoffs

=== Schedule ===
| Week | Game | Date | Opponent | Results | | Venue | Attendance |
| Week | Game | Date | Opponent | Score | Record | Venue | Attendance |

==== Postseason ====
| Round | Date | Opponent | Results | | Venue | Attendance |
| Round | Date | Opponent | Score | Record | Venue | Attendance |

=== Player stats ===
==== Passing ====
| Player | Games Played | Attempts | Completions | Yards | Pct. | Interceptions | Long | Touchdowns |
| Matt Dunigan | 13 | 412 | 220 | 3273 | 53.4 | 19 | 81 | 21 |

=== Awards and honors ===
- Molson Toughest Yard Award: Matt Dunigan
- Norm Fieldgate Trophy: James "Quick" Parker
