= Calgary Stampeders all-time records and statistics =

The following is a select list of Calgary Stampeders all-time records and statistics current to the 2026 CFL season. Each category lists the top five players, where known, except for when the fifth place player is tied in which case all players with the same number are listed.

== Service ==
Most games played

- 276 – Mark McLoughlin (1988–2003)
- 255 – René Paredes (2011–19, 2021–26)
- 224 – Larry Robinson (1961–74)
- 223 – Jay McNeil (1994–2007)
- 216 – Jamie Crysdale (1993–2005)

Most seasons played

- 16 – Mark McLoughlin (1988–2003)
- 15 – René Paredes (2011–19, 2021–26)
- 14 – Larry Robinson (1961–74)
- 14 – Jay McNeil (1994–2007)
- 13 – Stu Laird (1984–96)
- 13 – Alondra Johnson (1991–2003)
- 13 – Jamie Crysdale (1993–2005)

== Scoring ==
Most points – career

- 2,957 – Mark McLoughlin (1988–2003)
- 2,559 – René Paredes (2011–19, 2021–26)
- 1,275 – J.T. Hay (1979–88)
- 1,030 – Larry Robinson (1961–75)
- 930 – Sandro DeAngelis (2005–09)

Most points – season

- 220 – Mark McLoughlin (1995)
- 220 – Mark McLoughlin (1996)
- 217 – Sandro DeAngelis (2008)
- 215 – Mark McLoughlin (1993)
- 214 – Sandro DeAngelis (2006)

Most points – game

- 30 – Earl Lunsford – versus Edmonton Eskimos, September 3, 1962
- 26 – Mark McLoughlin – versus Saskatchewan Roughriders, August 5, 1996
- 24 – Gene Filipski – at BC Lions, November 5, 1961
- 24 – Herm Harrison – at Winnipeg Blue Bombers, September 2, 1970
- 24 – Jon Cornish – versus Saskatchewan Roughriders, August 9, 2013
- 24 – Romar Morris – versus Edmonton Eskimos, September 8, 2018
- 24 – Reggie Begelton – versus Montreal Alouettes, August 17, 2019
- 24 – Tommy Stevens – versus Edmonton Eskimos, September 10, 2022

Most touchdowns – career

- 117 – Allen Pitts (1990–2000)
- 76 – Kelvin Anderson (1996–2002)
- 67 – Nik Lewis (2004–14)
- 62 – Tom Forzani (1973–83)
- 61 – Joffrey Reynolds (2004–11)

Most touchdowns – season

- 21 – Allen Pitts (1994)
- 19 – Tony Stewart (1994)
- 17 – Terry Evanshen (1967)
- 16 – Kelvin Anderson (1998)
- 15 – eight times, most recently Romby Bryant (2010)

Most touchdowns – game

- 5 – Earl Lunsford – versus Edmonton Eskimos, September 3, 1962
- 4 – Gene Filipski – at BC Lions, November 5, 1961
- 4 – Herm Harrison – at Winnipeg Blue Bombers, September 2, 1970
- 4 – Jon Cornish – versus Saskatchewan Roughriders, August 9, 2013
- 4 – Romar Morris – versus Edmonton Eskimos, September 8, 2018
- 4 – Reggie Begelton – versus Montreal Alouettes, August 17, 2019
- 4 – Tommy Stevens – versus Edmonton Eskimos, September 10, 2022

Most rushing touchdowns – career

- 55 – Earl Lunsford (1956, 1959–63)
- 53 – Joffrey Reynolds (2004–11)
- 52 – Kelvin Anderson (1996–2002)
- 45 – James Sykes (1978–83)
- 44 – Jon Cornish (2007–15)

Most rushing touchdowns – season

- 14 – Tony Stewart (1994)
- 14 – Quincy Vaughn (2026)
- 13 – Earl Lunsford (1960)
- 13 – Lovell Coleman (1963)
- 13 – James Sykes (1978)

Most rushing touchdowns – game

- 5 – Earl Lunsford – versus Edmonton Eskimos, September 3, 1962
- 4 – Jon Cornish – versus Saskatchewan Roughriders, August 9, 2013
- 4 – Tommy Stevens – versus Edmonton Eskimos, September 10, 2022
- 3 – 17 times, most recently Jerome Messam – versus Hamilton Tiger-Cats, July 29, 2017

Most receiving touchdowns – career

- 117 – Allen Pitts (1990–2000)
- 65 – Nik Lewis (2004–14)
- 62 – Tom Forzani (1973–83)
- 57 – Travis Moore (1994, 1996–2002)
- 50 – Willie Armstead (1976–82)

Most receiving touchdowns – season

- 21 – Allen Pitts (1994)
- 17 – Terry Evanshen (1967)
- 15 – Allen Pitts (1991)
- 15 – Dave Sapunjis (1993)
- 15 – Travis Moore (2000)
- 15 – Romby Bryant (2010)

Most receiving touchdowns – game

- 4 – Herm Harrison – at Winnipeg Blue Bombers, September 2, 1970
- 4 – Reggie Begelton – versus Montreal Alouettes, August 17, 2019
- 3 – 12 times, most recently Maurice Price – versus Edmonton Eskimos, September 2, 2013

== Passing ==
Most passing yards – career

- 32,541 – Bo Levi Mitchell (2012–2019, 2021–22)
- 32,191 – Henry Burris (1998–99, 2005–11)
- 20,551 – Doug Flutie (1992–95)
- 16,741 – Peter Liske (1966–68, 1973–74)
- 16,449 – Jeff Garcia (1994–98)

Most passing yards – season

- 6,092 – Doug Flutie (1993)
- 5,945 – Doug Flutie (1992)
- 5,726 – Doug Flutie (1994)
- 5,385 – Bo Levi Mitchell (2016)
- 5,124 – Bo Levi Mitchell (2018)

Most passing yards – game

- 556 – Doug Flutie – at Ottawa Rough Riders, August 6, 1993
- 553 – Peter Liske – versus Saskatchewan Roughriders, September 29, 1968
- 547 – Doug Flutie – at Saskatchewan Roughriders, October 23, 1993
- 546 – Jeff Garcia – versus Edmonton Eskimos, September 4, 1995
- 495 – Joe Barnes – at BC Lions, August 17, 1985

Most pass completions – career

- 2,496 – Bo Levi Mitchell (2012–19, 2021–22)
- 2,267 – Henry Burris (1998–99, 2005–11)
- 1,438 – Doug Flutie (1992–95)
- 1,250 – Jeff Garcia (1994–98)
- 1,145 – Peter Liske (1966–68, 1973–74)

Most pass completions – season

- 416 – Doug Flutie (1993)
- 412 – Bo Levi Mitchell (2016)
- 403 – Doug Flutie (1994)
- 396 – Doug Flutie (1992)
- 381 – Henry Burris (2008)

Most pass completions – game

- 37 – Doug Flutie – at Saskatchewan Roughriders, October 23, 1993
- 34 – Ken Johnson – at BC Lions, August 29, 1981
- 34 – Doug Flutie – versus Toronto Argonauts, July 28, 1993
- 34 – Marcus Crandell – at Edmonton Eskimos, September 10, 2004
- 34 – Bo Levi Mitchell – at Montreal Alouettes, July 14, 2017

Most passing touchdowns – career

- 203 – Henry Burris (1998–99, 2005–11)
- 188 – Bo Levi Mitchell (2012–19, 2021–22)
- 140 – Doug Flutie (1992–95)
- 111 – Peter Liske (1966–68, 1973–74)
- 106 – Jeff Garcia (1994–98)

Most passing touchdowns – season

- 48 – Doug Flutie (1994)
- 44 – Doug Flutie (1993)
- 40 – Peter Liske (1967)
- 39 – Henry Burris (2008)
- 38 – Henry Burris (2010)

Most passing touchdowns – game

- 6 – Peter Liske – versus Winnipeg Blue Bombers, October 15, 1967
- 6 – Doug Flutie – versus Winnipeg Blue Bombers, July 23, 1994
- 6 – Jeff Garcia – versus Edmonton Eskimos, September 4, 1995
- 6 – Dave Dickenson – at Saskatchewan Roughriders, July 28, 2000
- 6 – Vernon Adams Jr. – versus Toronto Argonauts, July 2, 2026
- 5 – eight times, most recently Henry Burris – versus Winnipeg Blue Bombers, October 18, 2008

Best completion percentage – career (minimum 100 attempts)

- 72.6 – Nick Arbuckle (2018–19)
- 68.3 – Jake Maier (2021–24)
- 66.7 – Kevin Glenn (2012–13)
- 66.4 – Drew Tate (2009–16)
- 65.5 – Vernon Adams (2025–26)

Best completion percentage – season (minimum 100 attempts)

- 74.7 – Jake Maier (2022)
- 73.1 – Nick Arbuckle (2019)
- 72.3 – Jake Maier (2024)
- 68.0 – Bo Levi Mitchell (2016)
- 67.1 – Doug Flutie (1995)

Best completion percentage – game (minimum 20 attempts)

- 91.7 – Jake Maier – (22/24) – versus Toronto Argonauts, August 4, 2023
- 90.9 – Bo Levi Mitchell – (20/22) – at Toronto Argonauts, June 23, 2018
- 87.9 – Bo Levi Mitchell – (29/33) – at Winnipeg Blue Bombers, July 26, 2013
- 86.4 – Nick Arbuckle – (19/22) – at Saskatchewan Roughriders, July 6, 2019
- 85.0 – Mike McCoy – (17/20) – at Toronto Argonauts, October 9, 1999

== Rushing ==
Most rushing yards – career

- 9,213 – Joffrey Reynolds (2004–11)
- 8,292 – Kelvin Anderson (1996–2002)
- 6,994 – Earl Lunsford (1956, 1959–63)
- 6,844 – Jon Cornish (2007–15)
- 6,395 – Lovell Coleman (1960–67)

Most rushing yards – season

- 1,896 – Willie Burden (1975)
- 1,813 – Jon Cornish (2013)
- 1,794 – Earl Lunsford (1961)
- 1,629 – Lovell Coleman (1964)
- 1,541 – Joffrey Reynolds (2006)

Most rushing yards – game

- 238 – Lovell Coleman – at Hamilton Tiger-Cats, September 15, 1964
- 238 – Willie Burden – versus Winnipeg Blue Bombers, November 2, 1975
- 224 – Lovell Coleman – versus Edmonton Eskimos, August 18, 1965
- 211 – Earl Lunsford – versus Edmonton Eskimos, September 5, 1960
- 209 – Earl Lunsford – versus BC Lions, November 5, 1961

Most rushing attempts – career

- 1,670 – Kelvin Anderson (1996–2002)
- 1,590 – Joffrey Reynolds (2004–11)
- 1,242 – Willie Burden (1974–81)
- 1,199 – Earl Lunsford (1956, 1959–63)
- 1,084 – Lovell Coleman (1960–67)

Most rushing attempts – season

- 332 – Willie Burden (1975)
- 296 – Earl Lunsford (1961)
- 262 – Kelvin Anderson (1999)
- 262 – Kelvin Anderson (2000)
- 260 – Lovell Coleman (1964)

Most rushing attempts – game

- 36 – Lovell Coleman – at Winnipeg Blue Bombers, August 12, 1963
- 34 – Willie Burden – versus Winnipeg Blue Bombers, November 2, 1975
- 31 – Earl Lunsford – versus BC Lions, November 5, 1961
- 29 – Joffrey Reynolds – versus Ottawa Renegades, September 22, 2005
- 29 – Kelvin Anderson – versus Edmonton Eskimos, October 25, 1998

Most 1000-yard seasons – career

- 7 – Kelvin Anderson (1996–2002)
- 6 – Joffrey Reynolds (2005–11)
- 5 – Earl Lunsford (1956, 1959–63)
- 4 – James Sykes (1978–83)
- 3 – Lovell Coleman (1960–67)
- 3 – Jon Cornish (2007–15)

== Receiving ==
Most receiving yards – career

- 14,891 – Allen Pitts (1990–2000)
- 11,250 – Nik Lewis (2004–14)
- 8,285 – Tom Forzani (1973–83)
- 7,536 – Travis Moore (1996–2002)
- 6,693 – Herm Harrison (1964–72)

Most receiving yards – season

- 2,036 – Allen Pitts (1994)
- 1,764 – Allen Pitts (1991)
- 1,662 – Terry Evanshen (1967)
- 1,655 – Dave Sapunjis (1995)
- 1,591 – Allen Pitts (1992)

Most receiving yards – game

- 249 – Kamar Jorden – versus Winnipeg Blue Bombers, August 25, 2018
- 237 – Herm Harrison – versus Saskatchewan Roughriders, September 29, 1968
- 230 – Brian Wiggins – at Saskatchewan Roughriders, October 23, 1993
- 217 – Derrick Crawford – at Ottawa Rough Riders, August 6, 1993
- 216 – Bob Shaw – at Edmonton Eskimos, October 11, 1952

Most receptions – career

- 966 – Allen Pitts (1990–2000)
- 805 – Nik Lewis (2004–14)
- 553 – Tom Forzani (1973–83)
- 470 – Travis Moore (1996–2002)
- 468 – Vince Danielsen (1994–2001)

Most receptions – season

- 126 – Allen Pitts (1994)
- 118 – Allen Pitts (1991)
- 111 – Dave Sapunjis (1995)
- 103 – Allen Pitts (1992)
- 103 – Dave Sapunjis (1993)

Most receptions – game

- 16 – Brian Wiggins – at Saskatchewan Roughriders, October 23, 1993
- 14 – Mike Levenseller – versus Saskatchewan Roughriders, August 19, 1984
- 13 – Chuck Holloway – versus Saskatchewan Roughriders, September 15, 1958
- 13 – Dave Sapunjis – at Birmingham Barracudas, August 26, 1995
- 12 – seven times, most recently Kamar Jorden – at Edmonton Elks, September 11, 2021

Most consecutive games with a reception

- 166 – Nik Lewis – (2004–14)
- 85 – Allen Pitts – (1990–95)
- 82 – Allen Pitts – (1996–2000)
- 81 – Ken-Yon Rambo – (2006–11)
- 78 – Marquay McDaniel – (2012–17)

== Interceptions ==
Most interceptions – career

- 50 – Larry Robinson (1961–75)
- 35 – Harvey Wylie (1956–64)
- 34 – Terry Irvin (1977–93, 1985)
- 30 – Frank Andruski (1966–73)
- 28 – Wayne Harris (1961–72)
- 28 – Jerry Keeling (1978–83)

Most interceptions – season

- 10 – Harvey Wylie (1959)
- 10 – Vernon Roberson (1975)
- 10 – Rich Robinson (1994)
- 10 – Greg Knox (1994)
- 9 – Rae Ross (1958)
- 9 – Larry Robinson (1963)
- 9 – Al Burleson (1979)

Most interceptions – game

- 3 – many players, most recently Tre Roberson – versus Ottawa Redblacks, June 15, 2019

Most interception return yards – career

- 756 – Keon Raymond (2008–15)
- 717 – Larry Robinson (1961–75)
- 676 – Frank Andruski (1966–73)
- 563 – Darrell Moir (1979–85)
- 526 – Ray Odums (1977–84)

Most interception return yards – season

- 246 – Dwight Anderson (2010)
- 237 – Keon Raymond (2011)
- 204 – Frank Andruski (1973)
- 203 – Keon Raymond (2014)
- 202 – Darryl Hall (1992)

Most interception return yards – game

- 138 – Jackie Kellogg – versus Hamilton Tiger-Cats, September 16, 2000
- 131 – William Fields – at Edmonton Eskimos, September 7, 2001
- 117 – Keon Raymond – at Saskatchewan Roughriders, August 12, 2011
- 115 – Karl Anthony – versus Saskatchewan Roughriders, October 10, 1993
- 113 – Nate Terry – at Edmonton Eskimos, September 9, 2005

== Tackles ==
- Note: Tackles were first recorded in 1987, but there was no differentiation between Defensive and Special Teams tackles. Those categorical differences were added in 1991.

Most defensive tackles – career

- 916 – Alondra Johnson (1991–2003)
- 644 – Brandon Smith (2008–19)
- 531 – Matt Finlay (1987–95)
- 530 – Richie Hall (1983–87)
- 438 – Jamar Wall (2012–19, 2021)

Most defensive tackles – season

- 131 – Micah Awe (2023)
- 123 – Alex Singleton (2017)
- 123 – Alex Singleton (2018)
- 122 – Doug Landry (1989)
- 116 – George White (2005)

Most defensive tackles – game

- 13 – Greg Peterson – at Winnipeg Blue Bombers, September 13, 1987
- 13 – Alex Singleton – versus Edmonton Eskimos, September 4, 2017
- 13 – Micah Awe – versus Saskatchewan Roughriders, October 13, 2023
- 13 – Micah Awe – versus Winnipeg Blue Bombers, October 27, 2023
- 12 – George White – versus Hamilton Tiger-Cats, October 14, 2005
- 12 – Cory Greenwood – at Winnipeg Blue Bombers, August 8, 2019
- 12 – Darnell Sankey – at Hamilton Tiger-Cats, September 17, 2021
- 12 – Darnell Sankey – at BC Lions, November 12, 2021
- 12 – Micah Awe – versus BC Lions, June 8, 2023

Most special teams tackles – career

- 158 – Raymond Biggs (1993–2000)
- 139 – Aldi Henry (1997–2002)
- 105 – Greg Frers (1993–95, 1998–2002)
- 96 – Roger Reinson (1994–99)
- 95 – Charlie Power (2014–19, 2021–23)

Most special teams tackles – season

- 35 – Aldi Henry (2001)
- 33 – Dave Sapunjis (1991)
- 31 – Raymond Biggs (1996)
- 27 – Paul Clatney (1991)
- 27 – Roger Reinson (1997)

Most special teams tackles – game

- 7 – Paul Clatney – versus BC Lions, July 11, 1991

== Quarterback sacks ==
- Note: Sacks were first recorded in 1981.

Most sacks – career

- 99 – Will Johnson (1989–96)
- 99 – Charleston Hughes (2008–17)
- 72 – Stu Laird (1984–96)
- 43 – Alondra Johnson (1991–2003)
- 41 – Micah Johnson (2013–18)

Most sacks – season

- 19 – Harold Hallman (1986)
- 18 – Charleston Hughes (2013)
- 17 – Will Johnson (1994)
- 16 – Will Johnson (1990)
- 16 – Kent Warnock (1990)
- 16 – Charleston Hughes (2016)

Most sacks – game

- 4 – Harold Hallman – versus Edmonton Eskimos, June 24, 1986
- 4 – Stu Laird – versus Edmonton Eskimos, June 24, 1986
- 4 – Alvis Satele – versus Toronto Argonauts, October 13, 1986
- 4 – Will Johnson – versus Las Vegas Posse, October 2, 1994
- 4 – Anwar Stewart – versus BC Lions, October 26, 2012

== Field goals ==
Most field goals – career

- 664 – Mark McLoughlin (1988–2003)
- 656 – René Paredes (2011–19, 2021–26)
- 282 – J.T. Hay (1979–88)
- 218 – Sandro DeAngelis (2005–09)
- 171 – Larry Robinson (1961–75)

Most field goals – season

- 56 – Sandro DeAngelis (2006)
- 56 – René Paredes (2016)
- 54 – Mark McLoughlin (1996)
- 54 – René Paredes (2013)
- 54 – René Paredes (2022)

Most field goals – game

- 8 – Mark McLoughlin – versus Saskatchewan Roughriders, August 5, 1996
- 6 – 12 times, most recently, René Paredes – versus Hamilton Tiger-Cats, June 7, 2024

Highest field goal accuracy – career (minimum 100 attempts)

- 87.6% – René Paredes (2011–19, 2021–25)
- 83.8% – Sandro DeAngelis (2005–09)
- 73.7% – Mark McLoughlin (1988–2003)
- 70.1% – J.T. Hay (1979–88)
- 60.9% – Cyril McFall (1974–78)

Highest field goal accuracy – season (minimum 30 attempts)

- 94.74% – René Paredes (2013)
- 93.18% – René Paredes (2024)
- 93.02% – René Paredes (2012)
- 91.67% – René Paredes (2021)
- 91.38% – René Paredes (2017)

Longest field goal

- 62 yards – René Paredes – versus Ottawa Redblacks, September 19, 2026
- 58 yards – Mark McLoughlin – at Saskatchewan Roughriders, October 9, 1988
- 57 yards – René Paredes – versus Edmonton Elks, September 2, 2024
- 57 yards – J. T. Hay – versus Ottawa Rough Riders, September 14, 1984
- 57 yards – Jude McAtamney – at BC Lions, June 27, 2026

Most consecutive field goals

- 39 – René Paredes (2012–13)
- 32 – René Paredes (2016)
- 30 – René Paredes (2021–22)
- 25 – René Paredes (2023–2024)
- 21 – René Paredes (2015)
