= Willie Burden =

American gridiron football player (1951–2015)

No. 10
- Position: Running back

Personal information
- Born: July 21, 1951; Raleigh, North Carolina, U.S.
- Died: December 4, 2015 (aged 64); Atlanta, Georgia, U.S.
- Listed height: 5 ft 11 in (1.80 m)
- Listed weight: 205 lb (93 kg)

Career information
- High school: Enloe (Raleigh)
- College: NC State (1970–1973)
- NFL draft: 1974: 6th round, 139th overall pick

Career history
- Detroit Lions (1974)*; Calgary Stampeders (1974–1981)
- * Offseason or practice squad member only

Awards and highlights
- CFL's Most Outstanding Player (1975); Jeff Nicklin Memorial Trophy (1975); Eddie James Memorial Trophy (1975); CFL All-Star (1975); 2× CFL West All-Star (1975, 1977); CFL rushing yards leader (1975); Calgary Stampeders No. 10 retired; TSN CFL Honour Roll; ACC Player of the Year (1973); 2× First-team All-ACC (1972, 1973)

Career CFL statistics
- Rushing yards: 6,234
- Rushing average: 5
- Rushing touchdowns: 32
- Receptions: 299
- Receiving yards: 2,669
- Receiving touchdowns: 16
- Canadian Football Hall of Fame

Willie Burden (July 21, 1951 – December 4, 2015) was an American professional football player for the Calgary Stampeders of the Canadian Football League (CFL). He was made a member of the Calgary Stampeder's Wall of Fame in 1992, and was inducted into the Canadian Football Hall of Fame in 2001. In 2006, Burden was voted to the Honour Roll of the CFL's top 50 players of the league's modern era by Canadian sports network TSN.

== Early life and college ==
Following an outstanding high school football career at Raleigh's William G. Enloe High School, Burden and Charley Young became the first African-Americans recruited to the North Carolina State University football team in 1970.

As sophomore in 1971, he led the team with 227 carries for 910 yards (4.0-yard avg.) and 8 rushing touchdowns. He set the school's single-game record with 198 rushing yards against Kent State University.

In 1972, when Lou Holtz arrived as the new head coach at North Carolina State University, he implemented split-back veer offense to take advantage of the talent at running back, that included Burden, Young, Stan Fritts and Roland Hooks. At the time, this was arguably the best group of running backs in the nation, they were known as "The Four Stallions" and everyone of them went on to play in a professional football league. He was third on the team behind Fritts and Young with 114 carries for 605 yards (5.3-yard avg.) and 6 rushing touchdowns.

In 1973, he was part of the Atlantic Coast Conference championship team as the starting halfback. He led the team with 150 carries for 1,014 yards (6.8-yard avg.) and 8 rushing touchdowns. He became the first player in school history to break the 1,000 yard rushing mark in a single-season. He also received All-ACC and Atlantic Coast Conference Football Player of the Year honors.

He rushed for 2,529 yards, 7th best in Wolfpack history. He graduated with a bachelor's degree in Economics. In 2009, he was inducted into the North Carolina Sports Hall of Fame.

== Professional career ==
=== Detroit Lions ===
Burden was selected by the Detroit Lions in the sixth round (139th overall) of the 1974 NFL season. He was also selected by the Portland Storm in the 17th round (198th overall) of the 1974 WFL Draft. He was waived by the Lions on September 11.

=== Calgary Stampeders ===
On September 17, 1974, he signed as a free agent with the Calgary Stampeders of the Canadian Football League.

The Stampeders would be Burden's home for eight seasons, between 1974 and 1981. He thrilled fans in his first season, rushing for 541 yards on 94 carries, but it was in his second season that he broke team and league records. He set a new CFL single-season rushing record, running 332 times for 1,896 yards. He also set a CFL record with 2,127 yards from scrimmage and led the league with 2,387 all-purpose yards and 15 total touchdowns. His best day was November 2 against the Winnipeg Blue Bombers, when he tied Lovell Coleman's team record of 238 yards in a game. Burden was rewarded with the CFL's Most Outstanding Player Award and All Canadian All Star honours in 1975. His 1975 record of 'most rushing yards in the first 5 games of a season' was beaten by Kory Sheets in 2013. Burden was also named an All West All Star in 1977.

In 1978, James Sykes was named the starter at running back for the Stampeders, while Burden was used more as a blocking fullback and as a receiver out of the backfield. His statistics began to decline after that season. In 1981, injuries limited him to play in only 8 games, registering 23 carries for 95 yards (4.1-yard avg.), 22 receptions for 183 yards and 4 touchdowns. He announced his retirement in June 1982.

Upon his retirement, Burden finished with 6,234 rushing yards, fifth best in Stampeders history after Kelvin Anderson, Earl Lunsford, Lovell Coleman and Joffrey Reynolds. He also recorded 1,242 carries, a 5.0 rushing average, 32 rushing touchdowns, 299 receptions (fourth in team history) for 2,669 yards and 16 receiving touchdowns.

His jersey number #10 was retired by the Stamps in 1982. He was added to their Wall of Fame in 1992, was inducted into the Canadian Football Hall of Fame in 2001 and was chosen as one of the league's 50 greatest stars. He played at 5 foot 10 inches and a bruising 218 pounds and is remembered fondly in Canada.

== Career statistics ==
| Year | Team | GP | Rush | Yards | Y/R | Lg | TD |
|---|---|---|---|---|---|---|---|
| 1974 | Calgary Stampeders | 6 | 94 | 541 | 5.8 | 71 | 3 |
| 1975 | Calgary Stampeders | 16 | 332 | 1896 | 5.7 | 40 | 10 |
| 1976 | Calgary Stampeders | 13 | 181 | 962 | 5.3 | 35 | 7 |
| 1977 | Calgary Stampeders | 16 | 220 | 1032 | 4.7 | 47 | 3 |
| 1978 | Calgary Stampeders | 15 | 160 | 627 | 3.9 | 23 | 2 |
| 1979 | Calgary Stampeders | 13 | 145 | 658 | 4.5 | 19 | 5 |
| 1980 | Calgary Stampeders | 16 | 87 | 423 | 4.9 | 23 | 2 |
| 1981 | Calgary Stampeders | 8 | 23 | 95 | 4.1 | 28 | 0 |
| | CFL Totals | 103 | 1,242 | 6,234 | 5.0 | 71 | 32 |

== Personal life ==
Burden's post-pro football life was equally successful. He received his master's degree in sports administration from Ohio University while working as an assistant football coach and instructor in the Department of Physical Education and Recreation. From 1984 to 1988, he served as Assistant Athletics Director at Tennessee Technological University while working on his doctorate in education at Tennessee State University (Ed.D.) which he received in 1990. In 1988, Burden returned to Ohio University to serve as Assistant Athletic Director. From 1990 to 1999, he served as the athletic director and as an instructor of Health and Physical Education for North Carolina A&T University.

Later he was an Associate Professor in Sports Management at Georgia Southern University. His research has been published in several academic journals. In 2005 Burden received another special honour, being inducted into Hall of Fame for the Boys & Girls Clubs of America of Raleigh, North Carolina, for his lifetime of good works.

Burden suffered from congestive heart failure for several years. On September 2, 2015, it was reported in the Calgary Herald that Burden had been hospitalized in Atlanta for 209 days with a heart condition, awaiting a transplant. He died in Atlanta on December 4, 2015, at the age of 64. At the time of his death, Burden resided in Statesboro, Georgia, with his wife, Velma, and children Willie Jr. and Freddie. He also had a daughter, Courtney Bledsoe, who resides in North Carolina.
