= Tom Casey (Canadian football) =

American gridiron football player (1924–2002)

No. 85, 81
- Positions: Running back Defensive back

Personal information
- Born: July 30, 1924; Wellsville, Ohio, U.S.
- Died: October 10, 2002 (aged 78)
- Listed height: 5 ft 11 in (1.80 m)
- Listed weight: 175 lb (79 kg)

Career information
- High school: Westinghouse (Pittsburgh, Pennsylvania)
- College: Hampton (1945–1947)
- NFL draft: 1948: undrafted

Career history
- New York Yankees (1948); Hamilton Wildcats (1949); Winnipeg Blue Bombers (1950–1956)

Awards and highlights
- Eddie James Memorial Trophy (1950); 6× WIFU All-Star (1950–1955); CFL rushing yards leader (1950); Manitoba Sports Hall of Fame (1993)

Career CFL statistics
- Rushing yards: 2,104
- Rushing average: 6.8
- Rushing touchdowns: 22
- Receptions: 91
- Receiving yards: 1,621
- Receiving touchdowns: 19
- Interceptions: 23
- Interception yards: 426
- Defensive touchdowns: 4
- Stats at Pro Football Reference
- Canadian Football Hall of Fame

Thomas Ray Casey (July 30, 1924 – October 10, 2002), also known as Tom "Citation" Casey was an American professional football player for the Winnipeg Blue Bombers of the Western Interprovincial Football Union from 1950 to 1956, during which time he led the league in rushing yards and was named a divisional all-star each year. He was elected into the Canadian Football Hall of Fame in 1964, the first African American to be inducted. He also played one year for the Hamilton Wildcats in 1949. He was named to the All-Time Blue Bomber Greats 75th Anniversary team.

Casey was a practicing medical doctor. Casey attended Hampton University. While attending Hampton he was on the charter line in 1947 for the Gamma Epsilon chapter of the Omega Psi Phi fraternity. He was inducted into the Manitoba Sports Hall of Fame and Museum in 1993. Casey died on October 10, 2002.

Casey was the son-in-law of African American entrepreneur Samuel B. Fuller.
