= Jake Maier =

American gridiron football player (born 1997)

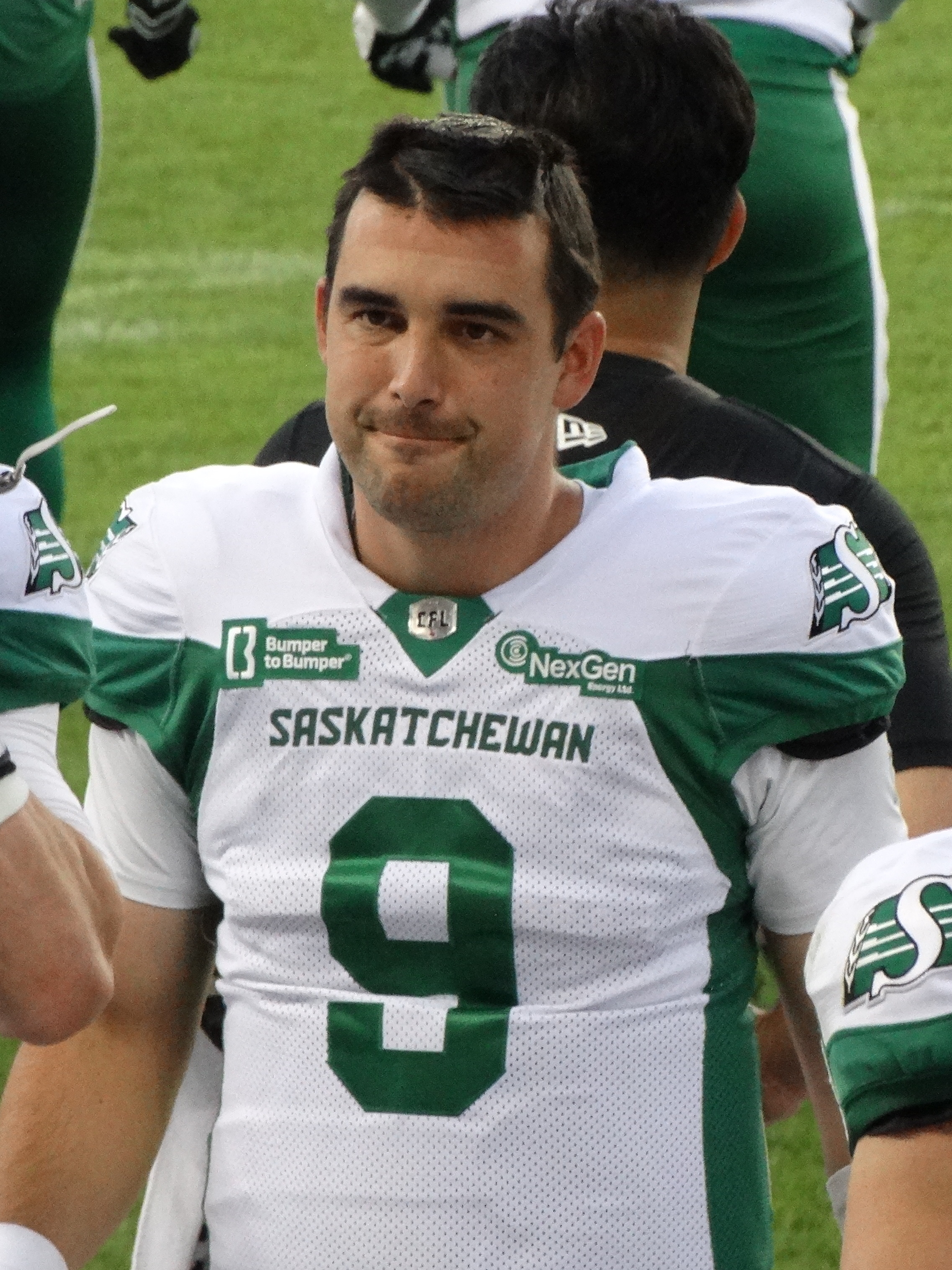
- Maier with the Saskatchewan Roughriders in 2025

No. 13 – Ottawa Redblacks
- Position: Quarterback
- Roster status: Active
- CFL status: American

Personal information
- Born: April 9, 1997 (age 29); Fullerton, California, U.S.
- Listed height: 6 ft 0 in (1.83 m)
- Listed weight: 200 lb (91 kg)

Career information
- High school: St. Paul (Santa Fe Springs, California)
- College: Sacred Heart (2015 redshirt); Long Beach CC (2016); UC Davis (2017–2019)
- NFL draft: 2020: undrafted

Career history
- 2020–2024: Calgary Stampeders
- 2025: Saskatchewan Roughriders
- 2026–present: Ottawa Redblacks

Awards and highlights
- Grey Cup champion (2025); Big Sky Offensive Player of the Year (2018); First-team All-Big Sky (2018); Big Sky Newcomer of the Year (2017)

Career CFL statistics as of Week 15, 2026
- Passing completions: 1,364
- Passing attempts: 2,001
- Completion percentage: 68.2
- Passing yards: 15,441
- TD–INT: 76–55
- Stats at CFL.ca

Jake Maier (born April 9, 1997) is an American professional football quarterback for the Ottawa Redblacks of the Canadian Football League (CFL). He played college football for the UC Davis Aggies.

== Early life ==
Maier was born in Fullerton, California. He played football and baseball at St. Paul High School in Santa Fe Springs, California.

== College career ==
In 2015, Maier redshirted with Sacred Heart University in Fairfield, Connecticut.

Maier played college football for the Long Beach Vikings in 2016 and was named the Southern California Football Association Central Division Offensive Player of the Year.

He then transferred to UC Davis for the next three seasons (2017 to 2019). He was named the Big Sky Offensive Player of the Year in 2018. Finished collegiate career as the UC Davis career leader in attempts (1,495), completions (992) and yards (11,163), while his career TDs (88) ranked second only to J.T. O'Sullivan.

== Professional career ==
Pre-draft measurables
Height	Weight	Arm length	Hand span	Wingspan
6 ft 0 1/2 in (1.84 m)	211 lb (96 kg)	30 3/8 in (0.77 m)	9 1/8 in (0.23 m)	6 ft 0 3/8 in (1.84 m)
All values from Pro Day

=== Calgary Stampeders ===
Dan Hawkins, Maier's head coach at UC Davis, mentioned to Maier that he could potentially flourish in the Canadian Football League. Following Maier's 2017 season at UC Davis, Hawkins reached out to Ryan Dinwiddie, who had played quarterback for Hawkins at Boise State University from 2001 to 2003, and had been on Hawkins' coaching staff with the Montreal Alouettes in 2013. Hawkins told Dinwiddie, who was coaching quarterbacks with the Calgary Stampeders at the time, “you’d better put this kid on your [negotiation] list cause he’s legit. He’s got the ‘it’ factor. He has what I call the ‘rage to master.'” The Stampeders added Maier to their negotiation list in 2018.

On May 5, 2020, after completing his college career, Maier signed with the Calgary Stampeders. However, he did not play that year due to the cancellation of the 2020 CFL season.

Upon the conclusion of training camp for the 2021 season, Maier was placed on the injured list for week 1 and was then on the reserve roster for week 2. The Stampeders' incumbent starting quarterback, Bo Levi Mitchell, was injured in week 1 and played through the injury in week 2, but was ultimately placed on the 6-game injured list after the second game of the season. Following a competition in practice, Maier was named the team's starting quarterback over Michael O'Connor for the team's August 20, 2021 game against the Montreal Alouettes. Montreal's head coach, Khari Jones, was another former UC Davis quarterback. In the win over the Alouettes, he completed 16 of 29 pass attempts for two interceptions and completed his first touchdown pass on a four-yard throw to Kamar Jorden. In his second start, Maier set a Stampeder franchise record by completing 17 consecutive passes. On September 6, 2021, Maier's third start, he became the first quarterback in Canadian Football League history to throw for over 300 passing yards in each of his first three career starts. Maier had a 1–2 record as a starting quarterback that year. He also came off the bench in Calgary's final game of the regular season, against Winnipeg, and engineered a comeback victory in the fourth quarter. On December 31, 2021, Maier signed a contract extension with the Stampeders.

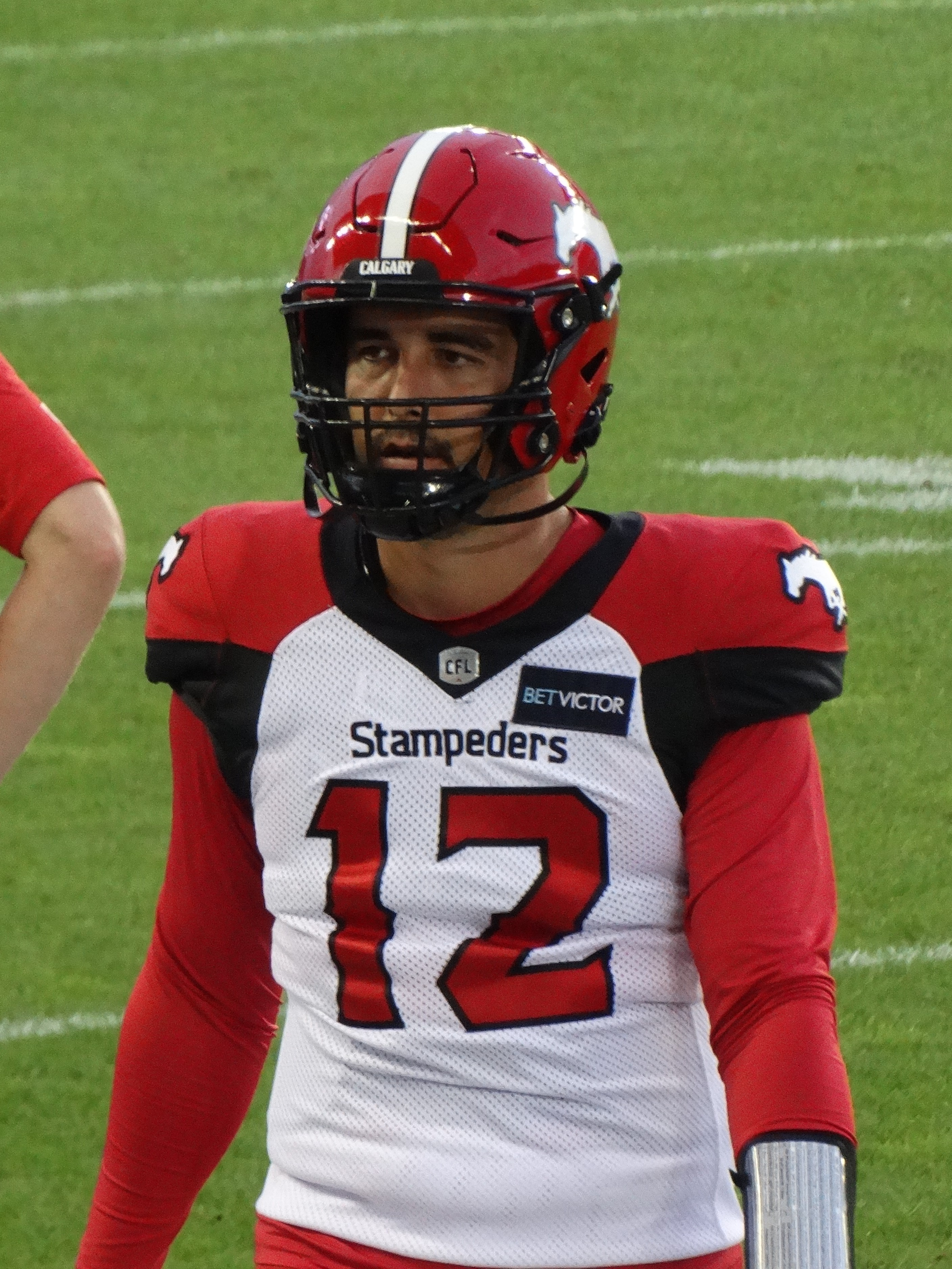
Maier with the Calgary Stampeders in 2022

In 2022, Maier started the season as the backup to Bo Levi Mitchell. In Week 1, Calgary was playing against Montreal. In this game, Maier replaced Mitchell, who was limping slightly as he headed to the sidelines in the fourth quarter. Maier was able to lead Calgary to a fourth quarter victory. Maier's next significant game action came in Week 11, when he replaced Mitchell in the second half and led the Stamps to victory over the Toronto Argonauts. Maier was named the starting quarterback the following week, and he continued to be the starter late into the season, helping the team clinch a playoff berth. On September 27, 2022, the Stampeders and Maier agreed to a two-year contract extension. Maier started his first playoff game, the West Semi-Final against the B.C. Lions, but he was replaced by Mitchell in the fourth quarter. Calgary lost 30–16.

In 2023, Mitchell was now with the Hamilton Tiger-Cats, so Maier was Calgary's undisputed starting quarterback going into the season. Highlights of this season for Maier included starting all 18 regular season games, leading the CFL in pass attempts and completions, finishing third in passing yards, and throwing four touchdown passes in two separate games. The Stampeders finished with a disappointing 6–12 record, but were able to qualify for the playoffs. Maier started the West Semi-Final against B.C. for the second consecutive year, but Calgary would go on to lose 41–30.

In 2024, Maier started the first 11 games for the Stampeders, leading the team to a 4–7 record. Prior to the Labour Day Rematch against Edmonton, the Stampeders announced that Logan Bonner would start the game, with Maier being the No. 2 quarterback. Prior to this, Maier had started 40 consecutive games (38 regular season and 2 playoff). In the Labour Day Rematch, Bonner was 21 of 36 passing for 284 yards with five interceptions and no touchdowns, and Calgary lost 37–16. The following Tuesday, as Calgary was preparing to play against the Montreal Alouettes, Maier was back taking the majority of first-team snaps at practice. In the later part of the season, Matthew Shiltz started two games for Calgary. Maier ultimately started 15 games on the season, winning five and tying one. The Stampeders missed the playoffs for the first time since the 2004 season.

=== Saskatchewan Roughriders ===
On December 23, 2024, it was announced that Maier had been traded to the Saskatchewan Roughriders in exchange for an eighth-round pick in the 2025 CFL draft. On January 9, 2025, the Roughriders announced that Maier had signed a one-year contract extension with the team. He dressed in all 18 games, starting two, for the Roughriders in 2025. Maier was the backup to Trevor Harris for Saskatchewan's victory in the 112th Grey Cup. He became a free agent upon the expiry of his contract on February 10, 2026.

=== Ottawa Redblacks ===
On February 10, 2026, it was announced that Maier had signed with the Ottawa Redblacks. While initially believed to be signed to be the backup behind Dru Brown, Maier was named the Redblacks' starting quarterback to open the season. Maier started the Redblacks’ first 12 games of the season, all of which were losses, before being benched for McLeod Bethel-Thompson and eventually further demoted to third-string behind Bryson Barnes and Bethel-Thompson.

== Career statistics ==
=== CFL ===
==== Regular season ====
Year	Team	Games			Passing							Rushing					Fumbles	
Year	Team	GD	GS	Record	Cmp	Att	Pct	Yds	TD	Int	Rtg	Att	Yds	Avg	Lng	TD	No.	Lost
2020	CGY	Season cancelled																
2021	CGY	11	3	1–2	95	148	64.2	1,211	5	3	92.5	16	31	1.9	5	2	0	0
2022	CGY	18	9	6–3	207	277	74.7	2,389	14	7	106.6	8	47	5.9	8	0	1	0
2023	CGY	18	18	6–12	363	578	62.8	4,244	19	15	85.2	26	108	4.2	11	3	3	1
2024	CGY	18	15	5–9–1	357	494	72.3	3,841	22	14	97.7	10	46	4.6	10	0	6	3
2025	SSK	18	2	1–1	56	87	64.4	617	2	2	83.4	4	21	5.3	10	0	0	0
2026	OTT	18	12	0–12	299	432	69.2	3,270	16	14	90.1	10	49	4.9	11	0	0	0
Career		101	59	19–39–1	1,377	2,016	68.3	15,572	78	55	92.7	74	302	4.1	21	5	10	4

==== Playoffs ====
Year	Game	GD	GS	Passing							Rushing					Fumbles	
Year	Game	GD	GS	Comp	Att	Pct	Yards	TD	Int	QBR	Att	Yards	Avg	Long	TD	No.	Lost
2021	West Semi-Final	1	0	0	–	–	–	–	–	–	1	1	1.0	1	0	0	0
2022	West Semi-Final	1	1	12	22	54.5	138	0	0	73.7	1	6	6.0	6	0	0	0
2023	West Semi-Final	1	1	23	34	67.6	304	2	2	90.8	0	–	–	–	–	0	0
2025	West Final	1	0	–	–	–	–	–	–	–	–	–	–	–	–	–	–
2025	112th Grey Cup	1	0	–	–	–	–	–	–	–	–	–	–	–	–	–	–
Totals		5	2	35	56	62.5	442	2	2	84.1	2	7	3.5	6	0	0	0

=== College ===
Season	Team	Games			Passing								Rushing			
Season	Team	GP	GS	Record	Cmp	Att	Pct	Yds	Y/A	TD	Int	Rtg	Att	Yds	Avg	TD
2015	Sacred Heart	0	0	—	Redshirted (redshirt)											
2016	Long Beach City	11	11	9–2	268	422	63.5	3,689	8.7	38	8	162.9	68	116	1.7	2
2017	UC Davis	11	11	5–6	306	446	68.6	3,669	8.2	26	10	152.5	21	46	2.1	1
2018	UC Davis	13	13	10–3	364	557	65.4	3,931	7.1	34	10	141.2	37	−17	−0.5	3
2019	UC Davis	12	12	5–7	322	492	65.4	3,563	7.2	28	13	139.8	25	−82	−3.3	0
Career		47	47	29–18	1,260	1,817	65.0	14,752	8.1	126	41	153.5	141	63	0.5	6
