= Eddie James Memorial Trophy =

Canadian Football League Trophy

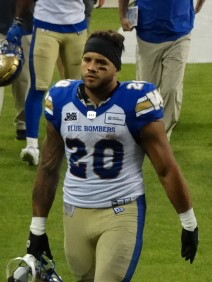
- Brady Oliveira, the 2024 recipient
- League: Canadian Football League (CFL)
- Awarded for: Having the most rushing yards in the West Division of the CFL
- Country: Canada

History
- First award: 1950; 76 years ago
- Editions: 73
- First winner: Tom Casey
- Most wins: George Reed (6 titles)
- Most recent: Dedrick Mills
- Website: cfl.ca

The Eddie James Memorial Trophy is a trophy awarded to the leading rusher in the West Division of the Canadian Football League. Unlike other CFL trophies, there is no equivalent for the East Division.

This trophy, first awarded in the 1950 season, is named after Eddie James, a running back for the Regina Roughriders in the 1930s. In 1995, as part of the American expansion, the trophy was awarded to the leading rusher in the North Division.

Although this award is typically won by running backs, two quarterbacks (Tracy Ham and Damon Allen) have also won the award. George Reed currently has the most trophies with six, and the award-winner with the most rushing yards in a season is Willie Burden with 1,896.

== Eddie James Memorial Trophy winners ==
Year	Player	Position	Club	Rushing yards	Ref.
2025	Dedrick Mills	(RB)	Calgary Stampeders	1,409	
2024	Brady Oliveira	(RB)	Winnipeg Blue Bombers	1,353	
2023	Brady Oliveira	(RB)	Winnipeg Blue Bombers	1,534	
2022	Ka'Deem Carey	(RB)	Calgary Stampeders	1,088	
2021	Ka'Deem Carey	(RB)	Calgary Stampeders	869	
2020	N/A	N/A	N/A	N/A	
2019	Andrew Harris	(RB)	Winnipeg Blue Bombers	1,380	
2018	Andrew Harris	(RB)	Winnipeg Blue Bombers	1,390	
2017	Andrew Harris	(RB)	Winnipeg Blue Bombers	1,035	
2016	Jerome Messam	(RB)	Calgary Stampeders	1,198	
2015	Andrew Harris	(RB)	BC Lions	1,039	
2014	Jon Cornish	(RB)	Calgary Stampeders	1,082	
2013	Jon Cornish	(RB)	Calgary Stampeders	1,813	
2012	Jon Cornish	(RB)	Calgary Stampeders	1,457	
2011	Jerome Messam	(RB)	Edmonton Eskimos	1,057	
2010	Joffrey Reynolds	(RB)	Calgary Stampeders	1,200	
2009	Joffrey Reynolds	(RB)	Calgary Stampeders	1,504	
2008	Joffrey Reynolds	(RB)	Calgary Stampeders	1,310	
2007	Joe Smith	(RB)	BC Lions	1,510	
2006	Joffrey Reynolds	(RB)	Calgary Stampeders	1,541	
2005	Charles Roberts	(RB)	Winnipeg Blue Bombers	1,624	
2004	Charles Roberts	(RB)	Winnipeg Blue Bombers	1,522	
2003	Charles Roberts	(RB)	Winnipeg Blue Bombers	1,554	
2002	John Avery	(RB)	Edmonton Eskimos	1,448	
2001	Kelvin Anderson	(RB)	Calgary Stampeders	1,383	
2000	Kelvin Anderson	(RB)	Calgary Stampeders	1,048	
1999	Robert Drummond	(RB)	BC Lions	1,309	
1998	Kelvin Anderson	(RB)	Calgary Stampeders	1,325	
1997	Kelvin Anderson	(RB)	Calgary Stampeders	1,088	
1996	Robert Mimbs	(RB)	Saskatchewan Roughriders	1,403	
1995	Cory Philpot	(RB)	BC Lions	1,308	
1994	Cory Philpot	(RB)	BC Lions	1,451	
1993	Damon Allen	(QB)	Edmonton Eskimos	920	
1992	Jon Volpe	(RB)	BC Lions	941	
1991	Jon Volpe	(RB)	BC Lions	1,395	
1990	Tracy Ham	(QB)	Edmonton Eskimos	1,096	
1989	Reggie Taylor	(RB)	Edmonton Eskimos	1,503	
1988	Anthony Cherry	(RB)	BC Lions	889	
1987	Gary Allen	(RB)	Calgary Stampeders	857	
1986	Gary Allen	(RB)	Calgary Stampeders	1,153	
1985	Willard Reaves	(RB)	Winnipeg Blue Bombers	1,323	
1984	Willard Reaves	(RB)	Winnipeg Blue Bombers	1,733	
1983	Willard Reaves	(RB)	Winnipeg Blue Bombers	898	
1982	William Miller	(RB)	Winnipeg Blue Bombers	1,076	
1981	James Sykes	(RB)	Calgary Stampeders	1,107	
1980	James Sykes	(RB)	Calgary Stampeders	1,263	
1979	Jim Germany	(RB)	Edmonton Eskimos	1,324	
1978	Mike Strickland	(RB)	Saskatchewan Roughriders	1,306	
1977	Jim Washington	(RB)	Winnipeg Blue Bombers	1,262	
1976	Jim Washington	(RB)	Winnipeg Blue Bombers	1,277	
1975	Willie Burden	(RB)	Calgary Stampeders	1,896	
1974	George Reed	(RB)	Saskatchewan Roughriders	1,447	
1973	Roy Bell	(RB)	Edmonton Eskimos	1,455	
1972	Mack Herron	(RB)	Winnipeg Blue Bombers	1,527	
1971	Jim Evenson	(RB)	BC Lions	1,237	
1970	Hugh McKinnis	(RB)	Calgary Stampeders	1,135	
1969	George Reed	(RB)	Saskatchewan Roughriders	1,353	
1968	George Reed	(RB)	Saskatchewan Roughriders	1,222	
1967	George Reed	(RB)	Saskatchewan Roughriders	1,471	
1966	George Reed	(RB)	Saskatchewan Roughriders	1,409	
1965	George Reed	(RB)	Saskatchewan Roughriders	1,768	
1964	Lovell Coleman	(RB)	Calgary Stampeders	1,629	
1963	Lovell Coleman	(RB)	Calgary Stampeders	1,343	
1962	Nub Beamer	(RB)	BC Lions	1,161	
1961	Earl Lunsford	(RB)	Calgary Stampeders	1,794	
1960	Earl Lunsford	(RB)	Calgary Stampeders	1,343	
1959	Johnny Bright	(RB)	Edmonton Eskimos	1,340	
1958	Johnny Bright	(RB)	Edmonton Eskimos	1,722	
1957	Johnny Bright	(RB)	Edmonton Eskimos	1,679	
1956	Normie Kwong	(RB)	Edmonton Eskimos	1,437	
1955	Normie Kwong	(RB)	Edmonton Eskimos	1,250	
1954	Howard Waugh	(RB)	Calgary Stampeders	1,043	
1953	Billy Vessels	(RB)	Edmonton Eskimos	926	
1952	Johnny Bright	(RB)	Calgary Stampeders	815	
1951	Normie Kwong	(RB)	Edmonton Eskimos	933	
1950	Tom Casey	(RB)	Winnipeg Blue Bombers	637	
