= Vernon Adams =

American gridiron football player (born 1993)

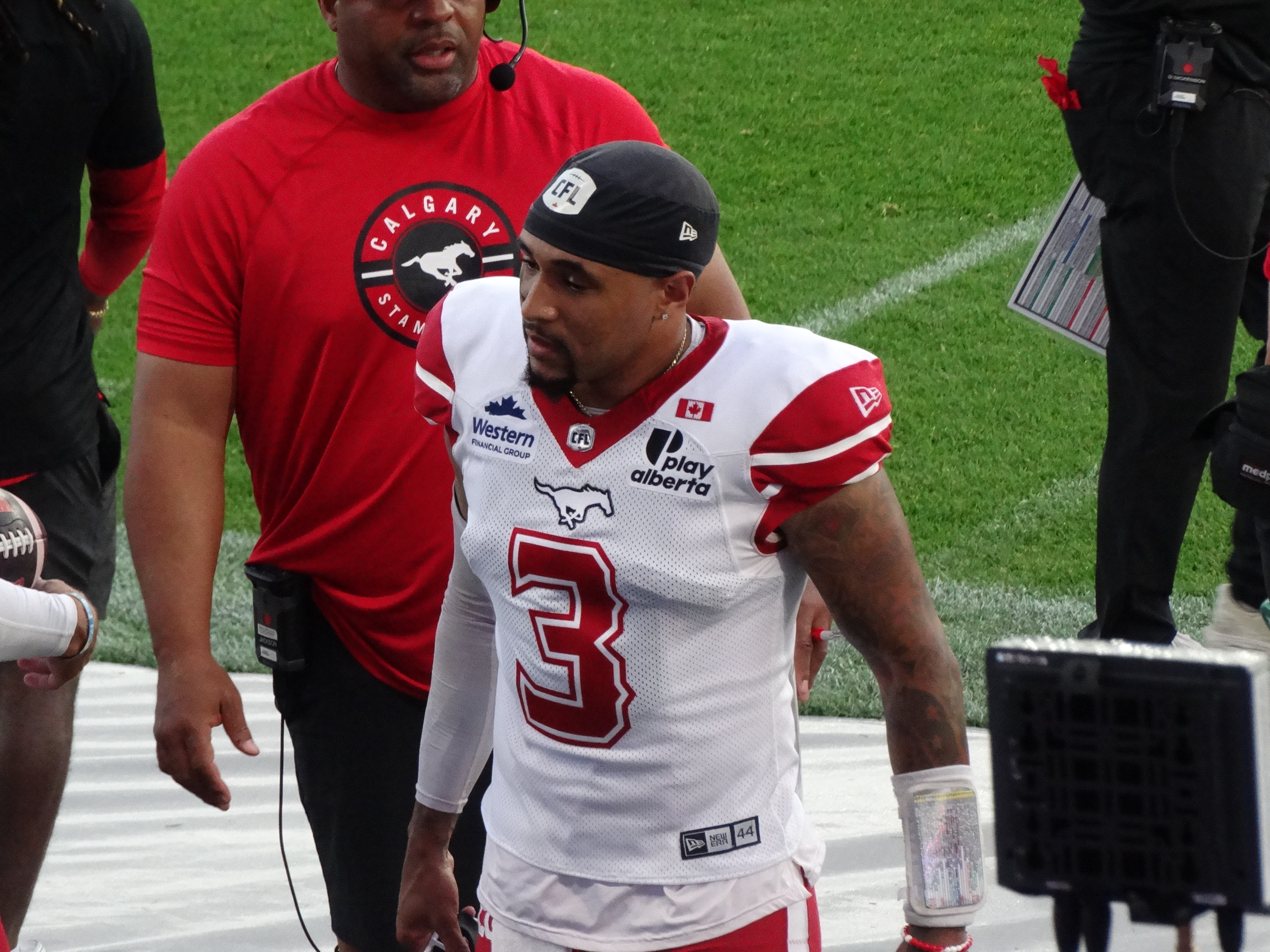
- Adams with the Calgary Stampeders in 2026

No. 3 – Calgary Stampeders
- Position: Quarterback
- Roster status: Active
- CFL status: American

Personal information
- Born: January 3, 1993 (age 33); Pasadena, California, U.S.
- Listed height: 5 ft 11 in (1.80 m)
- Listed weight: 196 lb (89 kg)

Career information
- High school: Bishop Alemany; (Los Angeles, California)
- College: Eastern Washington (2012–2014); Oregon (2015)
- NFL draft: 2016: undrafted

Career history
- 2016–2017: Montreal Alouettes
- 2017: Saskatchewan Roughriders
- 2018: Hamilton Tiger-Cats
- 2018–2022: Montreal Alouettes
- 2022–2024: BC Lions
- 2025–present: Calgary Stampeders

Awards and highlights
- CFL East All-Star (2019); CFL rushing touchdowns co-leader (2019); CFL passing yardage leader (2023); CFL passing touchdowns leader (2026); 2× Big Sky Offensive Player of the Year (2013, 2014); 2× First-team All-Big Sky (2013, 2014)

Career CFL statistics as of 2026
- Passing completions: 1,771
- Passing attempts: 2,734
- Passing yards: 24,970
- TD–INT: 153–74
- Rushing yards: 2,357
- Rushing touchdowns: 29
- Stats at CFL.ca

Vernon Anthony Adams Jr. (born January 3, 1993) is an American professional football quarterback for the Calgary Stampeders of the Canadian Football League (CFL). He played college football for the Eastern Washington Eagles and Oregon Ducks. He has also been a member of the Montreal Alouettes, Hamilton Tiger-Cats, Saskatchewan Roughriders and BC Lions.

== Early life ==
Adams graduated from Bishop Alemany High School in Mission Hills, Los Angeles, in 2011. In his final two seasons, he passed for 5,234 yards and 49 touchdowns, and rushed for another 1,263 yards and 19 more scores in leading Alemany to an overall record of 22–5.

As a junior, Adams passed for 2,333 yards and 22 touchdowns, and also rushed for 367 yards and five scores. He led Alemany to a 10–4 record.

As a senior, he was selected the Serra League Most Valuable Player after leading the Warriors to the league title in 2010. He earned first team all-league honors for the second-straight season. Alemany won its first 12 games before losing its final game of the season, 28–21, against eventual champion Servite High School in the semifinals of the CIF Southern Section Pac-5 Playoffs. He passed for 2,901 yards with 27 touchdowns and nine interceptions, and had 896 yards rushing with 14 touchdowns.

Coming out of high school, Adams did not receive any scholarship offers from Football Bowl Subdivision schools, due in part to concerns regarding his height. He would eventually receive only two scholarships offers from Football Championship Subdivision schools Portland State and Eastern Washington. Adams originally made a verbal commitment to Portland State, but flipped on National Signing Day and signed with Eastern Washington.

== College career ==
=== Eastern Washington ===
==== 2012 ====
After redshirting the 2011 season as Eastern Washington's Offensive Scout Team Player of the Year, Adams would split time at quarterback with Junior Kyle Padron in 2012. Starting in nine of twelve games, Adams helped lead the Eagles to the FCS playoff semifinals and finished the year with 1,961 yards passing, 20 touchdowns to 8 interceptions and a 160.80 pass efficiency rating, which was the fourth-best mark in the FCS that year.

In the Eagles' playoff loss to Sam Houston State, Adams came off of the bench in the second half, completing 14-of-26 passes for 364 yards and a school-record six touchdowns, nearly rallying the Eagles from a 35–0 halftime deficit.

Adams freshman season came with multiple accolades where he selected as the Freshman of the Year on the College Sporting News "Fabulous 50" All-America team and named to the College Sports Journal Freshman All-America squad. He was also one of 20 players on the ballot for the Jerry Rice Award, given to the top freshman in FCS by The Sports Network, which he finished in sixth place.

==== 2013 ====
Entering his sophomore season as the unquestioned starter, Adams catapulted himself onto the national stage when he engineered a 49–46 upset win at #25 Oregon State as he passed for 411 yards and four touchdowns while also rushing for 107 yards and two touchdowns. For his performance, Adams became the first-ever FCS player to be included in the HeismanPundit.com straw poll.

With a 12–3 record, Adams led the Eagles to the Big Sky Conference Championship and the NCAA Division I Semifinal while being named Big Sky All-Conference 1st Team, Big Sky Offensive Player of the Year, and selected as the FCS National Performer of the Year by College Football Performance Awards, the top overall honor given out by the CFPA at the FCS level. He also finished second in the voting for the Walter Payton Award.

Starting in all 15 games, Adams threw for 4,994 yards with 55 touchdown passes while also rushing for 605 yards.

==== 2014 ====
Adams entered his junior season as one of the most high-profile players at the FCS level. He would lead his team to a third-straight Big Sky Conference championship and a third-straight trip to the FCS playoffs. Adams' per-game averages for total offensive yards (376.8), passing yards (348.3) and points responsible for (24.8) were tops in the nation, but he didn't play enough games to officially be listed in NCAA statistics. Adams broke two bones in his foot during a win over Idaho State on October 4, causing him to miss four games.

Against Washington on September 5, Adams completed 31 of 46 passes for 475 yards and seven touchdowns in a 59–52 loss. The seven touchdowns were the most the Huskies had allowed to an opposing quarterback at home in school history.

Adams received a number of postseason awards, to include being named the Big Sky Conference Offensive Player of the Year and First-Team All-Big Sky Conference for the second-straight year. He was also named a First-Team All-American by the Associated Press. Adams was again a finalist for the Walter Payton Award, but was the runner-up for the second-straight year, losing to John Robertson of Villanova.

In January, Adams asked for, and was granted, a release from his scholarship from Eastern Washington so that he could speak to other programs in regards to transferring for his senior season. Adams contacted Oregon, UCLA, and Boise State. Texas and Maryland also contacted Adams in regards to transferring.

=== Oregon ===
On February 9, 2015, Adams announced his plans to accept a scholarship to Oregon and transfer for his senior season, choosing to play for the Ducks over remaining at Eastern Washington. However, later that summer it was reported that Adams needed to complete a math course in order to graduate from Eastern Washington University. On August 13, 2015, he passed the math class to graduate from Eastern Washington and officially joined the Oregon Ducks. After just two weeks on campus, Adams was named the starting quarterback on August 28. His first start came against his former team, Eastern Washington. Adams started 10 games and passed for 2,643 yards, 26 touchdowns and six interceptions, while leading the nation in passing efficiency with a 179.1 rating.

== Professional career ==
Pre-draft measurables
| Height | Weight | Arm length | Hand span | Wingspan | 40-yard dash | 10-yard split | 20-yard split | 20-yard shuttle | Three-cone drill | Vertical jump | Broad jump |
|---|---|---|---|---|---|---|---|---|---|---|---|
| 5 ft 10 7/8 in (1.80 m) | 200 lb (91 kg) | 30 1/4 in (0.77 m) | 9 1/8 in (0.23 m) | 6 ft 2 1/2 in (1.89 m) | 4.83 s | 1.67 s | 2.80 s | 4.20 s | 6.82 s | 29.5 in (0.75 m) | 9 ft 6 in (2.90 m) |
All values from NFL Combine

Adams went undrafted in the 2016 NFL draft. After the draft, he accepted an invitation to attend the Seattle Seahawks rookie mini-camp on a tryout basis. However, after the mini-camp was finished, the Seahawks decided not to sign Adams. Following that, Adams attended the Washington Redskins rookie mini-camp as a tryout.

On May 18, 2016, the BC Lions of the Canadian Football League revealed that they were negotiating with Adams who was on their negotiation list.

=== Montreal Alouettes (first stint) ===
On May 20, it was announced that Adams' rights were traded to the Montreal Alouettes in exchange for a 1st-round pick in the 2017 CFL draft. In response, Vernon Adams tweeted "Can't wait to get to Montreal Alouettes. Thank you God." It was announced that Adams had signed with the Alouettes on May 22, 2016, to a three-year contract. On October 22, he started his first game for the Alouettes. Adams started the final three games of the regular season, throwing four touchdowns and rushing for another while winning all three games. The Alouettes finished the 2016 season in second last place in the East division with a record of 7–11, missing the playoffs.

Adams dressed for the first seven games of the 2017 season as a backup for the Alouettes, and scored one rushing touchdown.

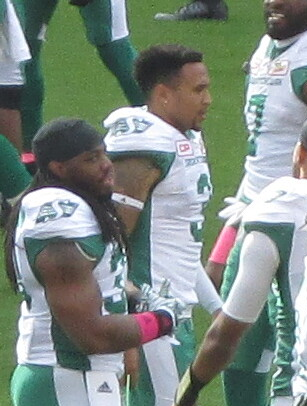
Adams with the Saskatchewan Roughriders in 2017

=== Saskatchewan Roughriders ===
On August 15, 2017, Adams, along with the Alouettes' fifth round pick in the 2018 CFL draft, was traded to the Saskatchewan Roughriders for Tevaughn Campbell, a third round pick in the 2018 CFL draft and a third round pick in the 2019 CFL draft.

With the Roughriders, Adams dressed for eleven regular season games, as well as the team's two playoff games, serving as a backup and short yardage rusher. He scored three rushing touchdowns for the team in the regular season, and added a touchdown on a quarterback sneak in Saskatchewan's victory in the East Semi-Final against the Ottawa Redblacks.

=== Hamilton Tiger-Cats ===
On February 2, 2018, Adams was traded to the Hamilton Tiger-Cats for all-star defensive lineman Charleston Hughes, who had earlier been traded to Hamilton from the Calgary Stampeders. On June 7, 2018, it was reported that Adams was about to be traded. However, a trade never materialized and he returned to the Ti-Cats as a wide receiver. Adams never played a game for Hamilton, and on June 21, 2018, he was one of three players released by the Tiger-Cats.

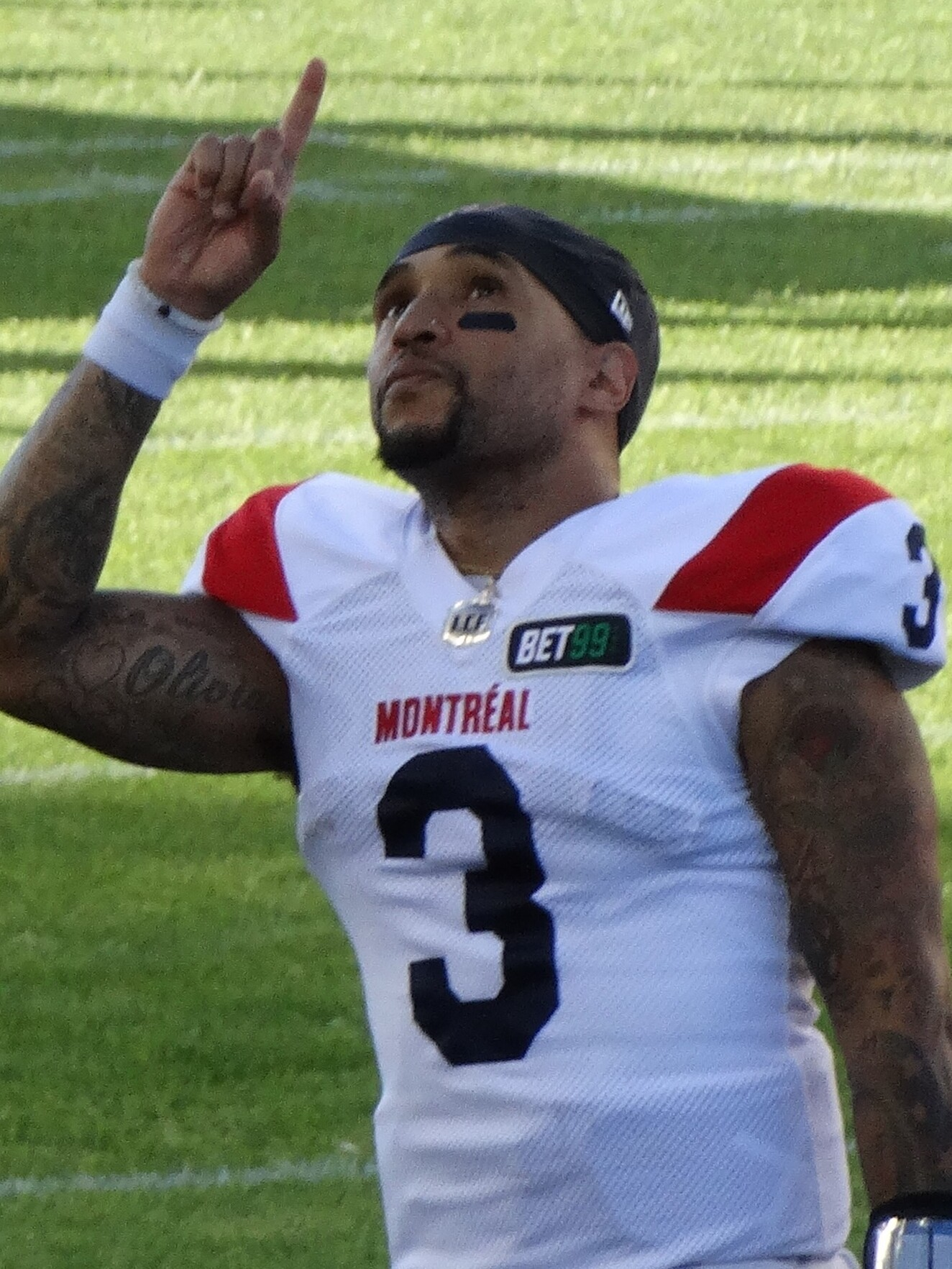
Adams with the Montreal Alouettes in 2022

=== Montreal Alouettes (second stint) ===
==== 2018 ====
On June 26, 2018, Adams was re-signed by the Alouettes. Adams started for the Alouettes in the team's Week 7 loss to the Edmonton Eskimos, completing 15 of 28 pass attempts for 217 yards with one interception, along with 72 yards rushing and a rushing touchdown. He replaced Johnny Manziel the following week following Manziel's interception-plagued CFL debut, and scored another rushing touchdown, but was subsequently listed as out "two to six weeks with a foot injury". Adams missed the rest of the year, but was signed a two-year contract extension with the Alouettes on October 28, 2018, alongside several other quarterbacks.

==== 2019 ====
Adams began the 2019 season as the Als' backup quarterback behind Antonio Pipkin. However, after Pipkin suffered a leg injury early in the season, Adams was announced the starting quarterback. Adams went on to start the next five games for the Alouettes, playing very well, winning three games in a row before suffering a concussion against the Redblacks in Week 8. Adams returned from injury in Week 10 and led the Alouettes to a come-from-behind victory over the defending champion Calgary Stampeders.

Adams continued his stellar play late into the season, leading the Alouettes to multiple come-from-behind victories, propelling his team to second place in the East Division with a record of 7–5. However, in one of those victories Adams ripped the helmet of Winnipeg Blue Bombers linebacker Adam Bighill off his head and then swung the helmet at Bighill's head. The play resulted in Adams being suspended for one game by the CFL, which he did not appeal. Adams finished with a 10–5 regular season record as the team's starting quarterback. With a playoff spot locked up several weeks before the season ended, Adams was named the team's Most Outstanding Player.

Adams started his first CFL playoff game, the East Semi-Final against the Edmonton Eskimos, who qualified for the crossover. In the game, he rushed for a fourth quarter touchdown, but also threw three interceptions to Josh Johnson. Montreal lost 37–29.

==== 2020 ====
In 2020, Adams did not play due to the cancellation of the CFL season because of the COVID-19 pandemic.

==== 2021 ====
Adams returned to the Alouettes as their starting quarterback and continued his strong play into the 2021 season. Adams suffered a shoulder injury in the last few minutes of the team's Week 10 match against the Ottawa Redblacks. The next day it was announced that the Alouettes had placed Adams on the six-game injured reserve list. On November 10, 2021, head coach Khari Jones ruled out the possibility of Adams returning to the lineup late in the season. Adams played in eight games in the 2021 season.

On December 16, 2021, Adams and the Alouettes agreed to a contract extension through the 2023 CFL season.

==== 2022 ====
Adams started the first game of the 2022 season, but after only gaining 21 yards of offense in the first quarter of the team's second game head coach Khari Jones turned to veteran quarterback Trevor Harris. After the first four games of the season, Khari Jones was fired and replaced by general manager Danny Maciocia, who retained Harris in his role as the starting quarterback. On July 27, 2022, Adams was added to the one-game injury list with an elbow injury. One week later, Adams was placed on the six-game injured reserve list with tendinitis in his throwing elbow.

=== BC Lions ===
==== 2022 ====
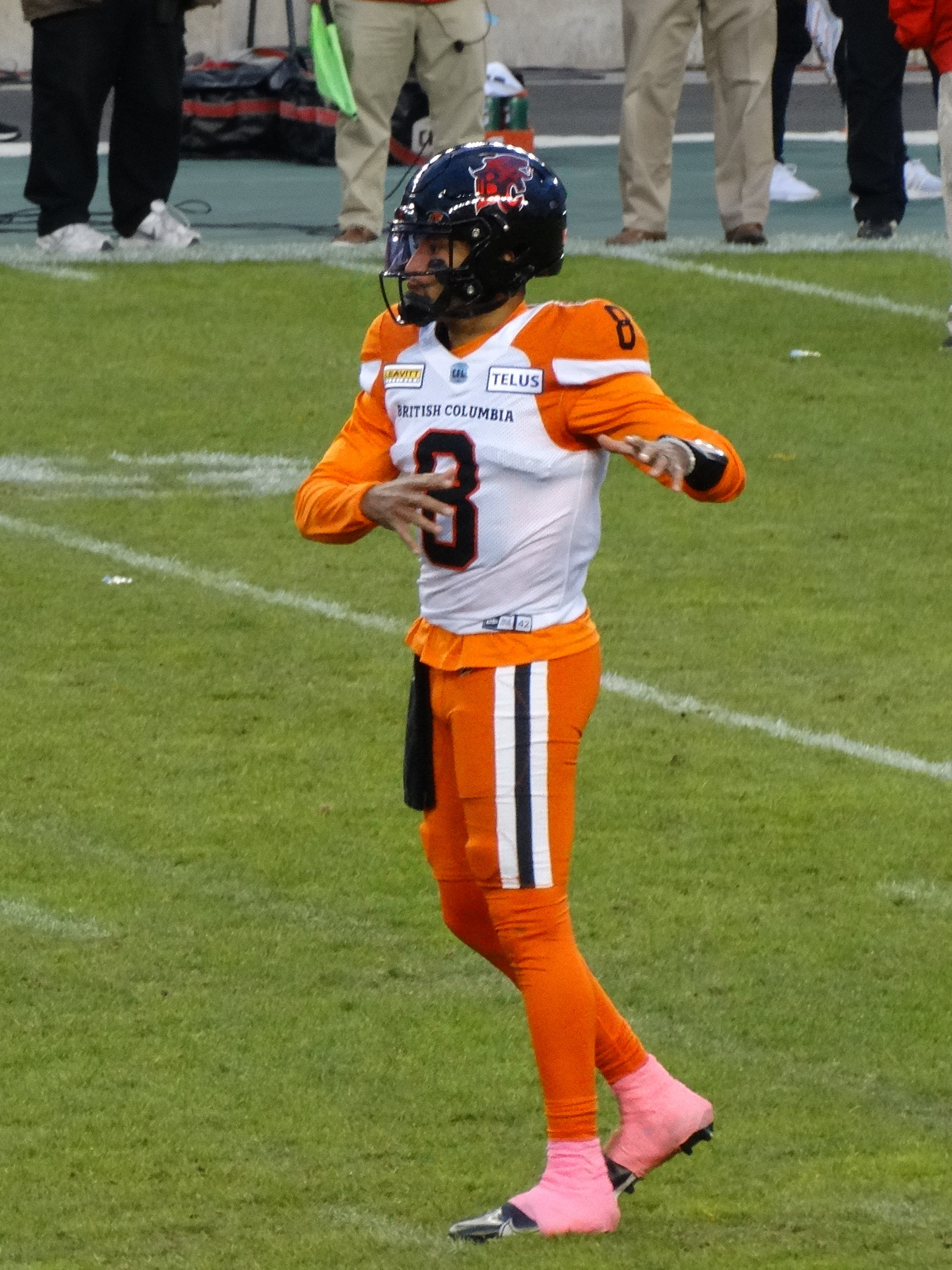
Adams with the BC Lions in 2022

On August 31, 2022, Adams was traded to the BC Lions, whose starting quarterback, Nathan Rourke, had suffered a Lisfranc injury, in exchange for a first-round pick in the 2023 CFL draft.

He first dressed as a backup quarterback in a game against his former team, the Alouettes, on September 9, 2022, where he completed one pass for 17 yards. After the Lions had suffered two straight losses without Rourke, Lions head coach Rick Campbell named Adams the starting quarterback for the Lions' Week 15 match against the Calgary Stampeders. Adams played in eight games for the Lions in 2022, starting in six with a 4–2 record, where he completed 118 of 180 pass attempts for 1,504 yards with six touchdown passes and one interception.

Rourke returned from injury in Week 21 and started the last regular season game and two playoff games, with Adams serving as the primary backup. Rourke signed with the Jacksonville Jaguars in January 2023, which created an opening for the starting quarterback position for the Lions.

On February 8, 2023, Adams and the Lions agreed to a two-year contract extension.

==== 2023 ====
Adams began the season as the Lions' starting quarterback in 2023 after Rourke departed for the NFL. He started the first six games of the season, winning five matches and losing once: The lone loss being a match against Toronto in which he threw six interceptions. In Week 7, he suffered what appeared to be a significant knee injury in against the Roughriders. On July 23, 2023, it was announced that he had avoided a serious knee injury and was considered 'week-to-week'. He missed two starts, with backup Dane Evans filling in, and started all other remaining games in the year, recording an 11–5 record as a starter. He dressed for 18 games, starting in 16, where he completed 333 of 488 pass attempts for 4,769 yards with 31 touchdowns and 18 interceptions, which were all career-high totals. Despite starting in just 16 games, Adams led the CFL in passing yardage.

In BC's 41–30 victory over the Calgary Stampeders in the West Semi-Final, Adams' passing statistics were 28 of 39 for 413 yards and two touchdowns, and he rushed for three more touchdowns. The following week, the Lions lost 24–13 to the Winnipeg Blue Bombers in the West Final. The highlight of the game for Adams was a 45-yard Hail Mary touchdown pass to Justin McInnis on the final play of the first half.

On February 21, 2024, Adams signed a three-year contract extension with the Lions.

==== 2024 ====
Adams guided the Lions to a 5–3 start to the 2024 season. In those eight games, he had five games over 300 passing yards, one of which was over 400 yards. In the team's eighth game of the season, the Lions were shut out 25–0 to the Winnipeg Blue Bombers. It was a difficult game for Adams, who threw for only 74 yards and the offence generated only three first downs before he had to leave the game with a knee injury in the fourth quarter. In the following game on August 11 against the Edmonton Elks, while he recovered from injury, Adams was listed as the third-string quarterback behind Jake Dolegala, who started the game, and Chase Brice.

On August 13, the Lions announced that they had re-signed Rourke, who had tried out in the NFL in 2023 and 2024. Lions head coach and co-general manager Rick Campbell said that the team intended to move forward with both Rourke and Adams on their roster: “For this to happen, it also had to include Vernon Adams Jr. being here. Vernon will not be traded and is too good a player, too valuable a leader and a huge part of our team.”

Rourke started the Lions' next eight games. For the final game of the regular season, which was against the Montreal Alouettes, B.C. decided to start Adams, giving him his first start since the shutout loss in Winnipeg. The Lions defeated the Alouettes 27–3 and finished the season 9–9, good for third place in the West Division and a matchup against the Saskatchewan Roughriders in the West Semi-Final.

Adams got the start in the West Semi-Final. In the first quarter, he threw a 56 yard touchdown pass to Jevon Cottoy. Before halftime, B.C. was facing 3rd and 3 at Saskatchewan's 50 yard line, and decided to leave the offense on the field. Adams executed a quick kick, which forced the Roughriders to start their next possession at their 6 yard line. Saskatchewan was unable to get a first down, and had to punt. The Lions started their next possession at Saskatchewan's 22 yard line; the possession ended with Adams throwing an 11 yard touchdown pass to Justin McInnis. These accomplishments were overshadowed, however, because Adams threw three interceptions, and the Lions lost 28–19.

=== Calgary Stampeders ===
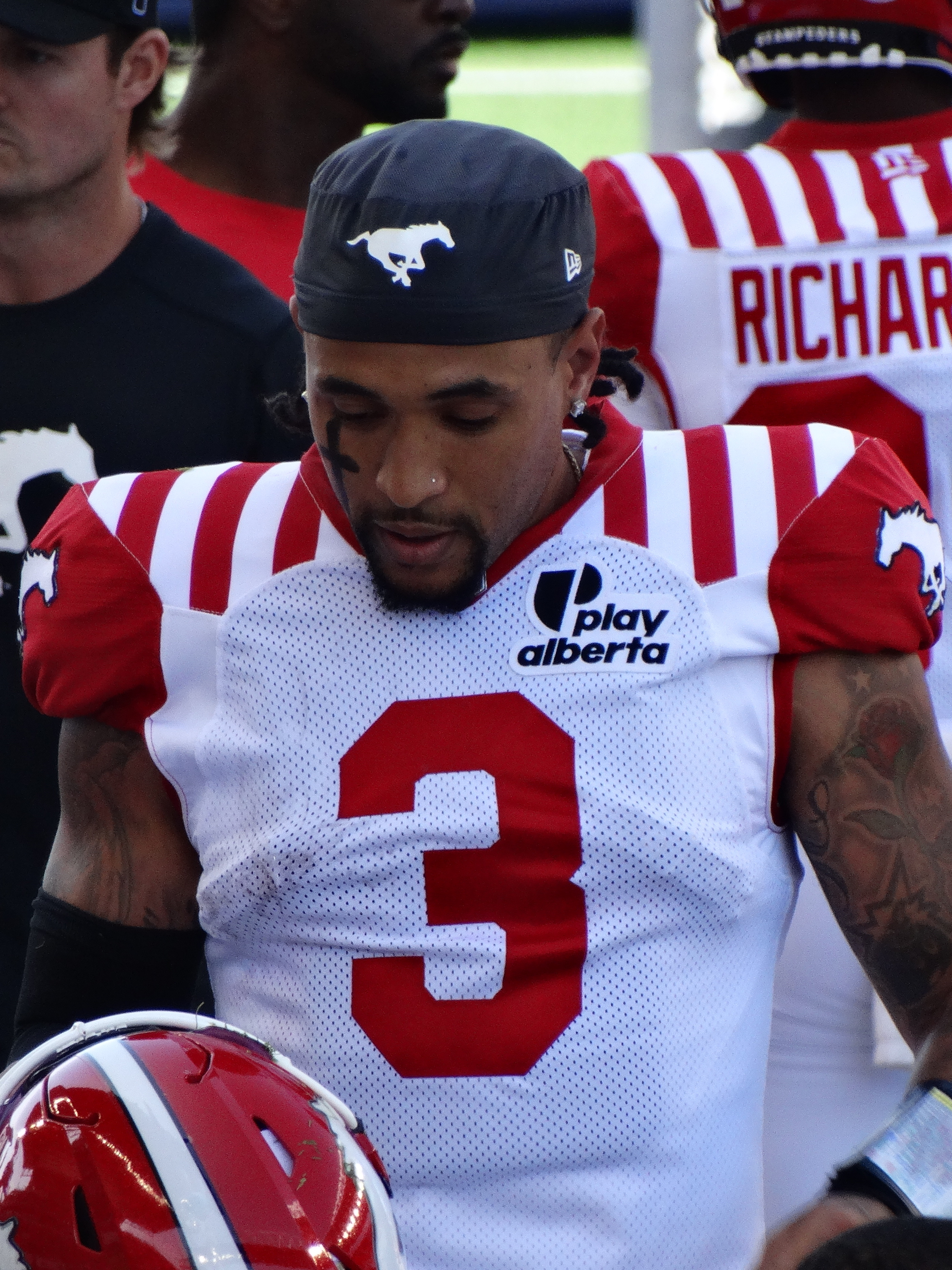
Adams with the Stampeders in 2025

On November 26, 2024, it was announced that Adams had been traded to the Calgary Stampeders in an exchange of draft picks. In his first season as a Stampeder, Adams started 17 games, throwing for 4,247 yards, 21 touchdowns and 14 interceptions while leading Calgary to an 11–7 record, good enough to qualify for the playoffs. In the West Semi-Final, despite Adams throwing for 334 yards and 2 touchdowns without an interception, the Stampeders lost to the Lions 33–30 off a last-second field goal. After the season, Adams signed a two-year extension with the Stampeders, keeping him under contract until 2028.

In Week 5 of the 2026 season, Adams completed 20 of 25 passes for 405 yards and six touchdowns, tying the franchise single-game record for passing touchdowns. He also rushed for a 22-yard touchdown, accounting for seven total touchdowns in a 58–36 victory over the Toronto Argonauts. In Week 8, Adams completed 18 of 27 passes for 319 yards and three touchdowns in a 52–30 victory over the Winnipeg Blue Bombers. On a touchdown pass to Tyreik McAllister during the game, he broke two CFL records. Adams opened the 2026 CFL season with 18 consecutive touchdown passes without an interception, surpassing Ricky Ray and Darian Durant, who each opened the 2013 CFL season with 17. Dating back to the previous season, he also threw 21 consecutive touchdown passes without an interception, breaking the previous CFL record of 20 set by his head coach, Dave Dickenson, during the 2000 CFL season.

== Career statistics ==
Legend
| | Led the league |
| **Bold** | League career high |

=== CFL ===
==== Regular season ====
| Year | Team | Games | | | Passing | | | | | | | | | Rushing | | | | | Sacks | |
| Year | Team | GD | GS | Record | Cmp | Att | Pct | Yds | Y/A | Lng | TD | Int | Rtg | Att | Yds | Avg | Lng | TD | Sck | SckY |
|---|---|---|---|---|---|---|---|---|---|---|---|---|---|---|---|---|---|---|---|---|
| 2016 | MTL | 15 | 3 | 3–0 | 42 | 75 | 56.0 | 575 | 7.7 | 41 | 4 | 1 | 92.9 | 29 | 112 | 3.9 | 18 | 1 | 14 | 84 |
| 2017 | MTL | 7 | 0 | — | 0 | 0 | 0.0 | 0 | 0.0 | 0 | 0 | 0 | 0.0 | 8 | 9 | 1.1 | 2 | 1 | 0 | 0 |
| 2017 | SSK | 11 | 0 | — | 1 | 3 | 33.3 | 8 | 2.7 | 8 | 0 | 0 | 42.4 | 12 | 33 | 2.8 | 9 | 3 | 2 | 6 |
| 2018 | MTL | 5 | 1 | 0–1 | 16 | 33 | 48.5 | 220 | 6.7 | 45 | 0 | 1 | 57.6 | 13 | 99 | 7.6 | **28** | 2 | 7 | 54 |
| 2019 | MTL | 16 | 15 | 10–5 | 281 | 429 | 65.5 | 3,924 | 9.1 | 75 | 24 | 13 | 100.8 | **82** | **394** | 4.8 | **28** | **12** | 26 | 180 |
| 2020 | MTL | Season cancelled | | | | | | | | | | | | | | | | | | |
| 2021 | MTL | 8 | 8 | 4–4 | 142 | 239 | 59.4 | 1,949 | 8.2 | 53 | 14 | 9 | 89.4 | 51 | 298 | 5.8 | 26 | 0 | 14 | 76 |
| 2022 | MTL | 5 | 2 | 0–2 | 21 | 39 | 53.8 | 294 | 7.5 | 55 | 1 | 2 | 65.5 | 8 | 33 | 4.1 | 10 | 1 | 7 | 44 |
| 2022 | BC | 8 | 6 | 4–2 | 118 | 180 | 65.6 | 1,504 | 8.4 | 54 | 6 | 1 | 100.3 | 15 | 129 | **8.6** | 24 | 0 | 21 | 118 |
| 2023 | BC | 18 | 16 | 11–5 | **333** | **488** | **68.2** | **4,769** | 9.8 | 78 | 31 | **18** | 105.5 | 48 | 324 | 6.8 | 24 | 1 | **42** | **293** |
| 2024 | BC | 18 | 9 | 6–3 | 197 | 302 | 65.2 | 2,929 | 9.7 | 71 | 16 | 9 | 102.1 | 40 | 213 | 5.3 | 19 | 3 | 22 | 176 |
| 2025 | CGY | 17 | 17 | 11–6 | 280 | 429 | 65.3 | 4,247 | **9.9** | **81** | 21 | 14 | 100.4 | 40 | 332 | 8.3 | 21 | 2 | 32 | 209 |
| 2026 | CGY | 17 | 17 | 8–9 | 338 | 515 | 65.6 | 4,533 | 8.8 | 73 | **36** | 6 | **111.9** | 46 | 381 | 8.3 | 24 | 3 | 33 | 200 |
| Career | | 145 | 94 | 57–37 | 1,771 | 2,734 | 64.8 | 24,970 | 9.1 | 81 | 153 | 74 | 101.5 | 391 | 2,357 | 6.0 | 28 | 29 | 220 | 1,440 |

==== Playoffs ====
| Year & game | Team | GP | GS | ATT | COMP | YD | TD | INT | RUSH | YD | TD |
|---|---|---|---|---|---|---|---|---|---|---|---|
| 2017 East Semi-Final | SSK | 1 | 0 | 0 | – | – | – | – | 3 | 3 | 1 |
| 2017 East Final | SSK | 1 | 0 | 0 | – | – | – | – | 1 | 1 | 0 |
| 2019 East Semi-Final | MTL | 1 | 1 | 27 | 14 | 226 | 0 | 3 | 6 | 57 | 1 |
| 2021 East Semi-Final | MTL | 0 | – | – | – | – | – | – | – | – | – |
| 2022 West Semi-Final | BC | 1 | 0 | 0 | – | – | – | – | 0 | – | – |
| 2022 West Final | BC | 1 | 0 | 0 | – | – | – | – | 0 | – | – |
| 2023 West Semi-Final | BC | 1 | 1 | 39 | 28 | 413 | 2 | 0 | 7 | 54 | 3 |
| 2023 West Final | BC | 1 | 1 | 26 | 13 | 221 | 1 | 3 | 2 | 7 | 0 |
| 2024 West Semi-Final | BC | 1 | 1 | 33 | 20 | 317 | 2 | 3 | 3 | 12 | 0 |
| 2025 West Semi-Final | CAL | 1 | 1 | 33 | 23 | 334 | 2 | 0 | 3 | 24 | 0 |
| Totals | | 9 | 5 | 158 | 98 | 1511 | 7 | 9 | 25 | 158 | 5 |

=== College ===
| Season | Team | Games | | | Passing | | | | | | | | Rushing | | | |
| Season | Team | GP | GS | Record | Cmp | Att | Pct | Yds | Y/A | TD | Int | Rtg | Att | Yds | Avg | TD |
|---|---|---|---|---|---|---|---|---|---|---|---|---|---|---|---|---|
| 2011 | Eastern Washington | 0 | 0 | — | Redshirted (redshirt) | | | | | | | | | | | |
| 2012 | Eastern Washington | 12 | 9 | 8–1 | 131 | 215 | 60.9 | 1,961 | 9.1 | 20 | 8 | 160.8 | 65 | 342 | 5.3 | 1 |
| 2013 | Eastern Washington | 15 | 15 | 12–3 | 319 | 486 | 65.6 | 4,994 | 10.3 | 55 | 15 | 183.1 | 132 | 605 | 4.6 | 4 |
| 2014 | Eastern Washington | 10 | 10 | 8–2 | 251 | 380 | 66.1 | 3,483 | 9.2 | 35 | 8 | 169.2 | 100 | 258 | 2.6 | 6 |
| 2015 | Oregon | 10 | 10 | 7–3 | 168 | 259 | 64.9 | 2,643 | 10.2 | 26 | 6 | 179.1 | 83 | 147 | 1.8 | 2 |
| FCS career | | 37 | 34 | 28–6 | 701 | 1,081 | 64.8 | 10,438 | 9.7 | 110 | 31 | 173.8 | 297 | 1,205 | 4.1 | 11 |
| FBS career | | 10 | 10 | 7–3 | 168 | 159 | 64.9 | 2,643 | 10.2 | 26 | 6 | 179.1 | 83 | 147 | 1.8 | 2 |

== Awards and honors ==
CFL

- CFL East All-Star (2019)
- CFL rushing touchdowns co-leader (2019)
- CFL passing yardage leader (2023)

College

- East-West Shrine Game Offensive MVP (2016)
- PAC-12 Newcomer of the Year (2015)
- Honorable Mention All-Pac-12 (2015)
- College Football Performance Awards FCS National Performer of the Year (2013)
- First Team FCS All-American (AP) (2014)
- First Team FCS All-American (AP, TSN) (2013)
- First Team FCS All-American College Sporting News (2012)
- 2× First Team All-Big Sky Conference (2013, 2014)
- 2× Big Sky Conference Offensive Player of the Year (2013, 2014)
- 2x Passing Efficiency Rating Statistical Champion NCAA (2013-183.4, 2015–179.1)
