= Eddie James (Canadian football) =

Canadian football player

Profile
- Positions: Running back, Defensive back, Flying wing

Personal information
- Born: September 30, 1907; Winnipeg, Manitoba, Canada
- Died: December 26, 1958 (aged 51); Winnipeg, Manitoba, Canada

Career history
- 1928: Regina Pats
- 1928–31: Regina Roughriders
- 1932: St.John's Rugby Football Club
- 1934–1935: Winnipeg 'Pegs

Awards and highlights
- Grey Cup champion (1935); Eddie James Memorial Trophy; Manitoba Sports Hall of Fame (2004)
- Canadian Football Hall of Fame (Class of 1963)

Eddie "Dynamite" James (September 30, 1907 – December 26, 1958) was a running back for the Regina Roughriders and the Winnipeg Blue Bombers of the Canadian Football League (CFL). James was inducted into the Canadian Football Hall of Fame in 1963 and into the Manitoba Sports Hall of Fame and Museum in 2004. The Eddie James Memorial Trophy is named after him. His son Gerry James also played for the Blue Bombers and also is inducted into the Canadian Football Hall of Fame.
