= Roger Reinson =

Canadian football player (born 1969)

Profile
- Position: Linebacker

Personal information
- Born: April 19, 1969 (age 57); Melville, Saskatchewan, Canada
- Listed height: 6 ft 0 in (1.83 m)
- Listed weight: 215 lb (98 kg)

Career information
- University: Calgary

Career history
- 1994–1999: Calgary Stampeders
- 2000: BC Lions
- 2001–2005: Edmonton Eskimos

Awards and highlights
- Grey Cup champion (1998, 2000, 2003, 2005)

Roger Reinson (born April 19, 1969) is a former Canadian Football League (CFL) linebacker who played six seasons for the Calgary Stampeders.

Roger Reinson played a major role as a long snapper in the CFL from 1994 till 2005 with the Calgary Stampeders, Edmonton Eskimos and the BC Lions. Reinson played in six Grey Cups and won four with all three teams he played. He played a Grey Cup in every CFL city in Western Canada.

A native of Regina, Reinson became a police officer in Calgary after his retirement from football.
