= Lovell Coleman =

American gridiron football player (1938–2016)

Profile
- Position: Running back

Personal information
- Born: May 9, 1938; Hamtramck, Michigan, U.S.
- Died: August 10, 2016 (aged 78); Kamloops, British Columbia, Canada
- Listed height: 5 ft 10 in (1.78 m)
- Listed weight: 195 lb (88 kg)

Career information
- College: Western Michigan
- NFL draft: 1960: 17th round, 199th overall pick
- AFL draft: 1960

Career history
- 1960–1967: Calgary Stampeders
- 1968: Ottawa Rough Riders
- 1970: BC Lions

Awards and highlights
- Grey Cup champion (1968); CFL's Most Outstanding Player Award (1964); 2× Eddie James Memorial Trophy (1963, 1964); 3× CFL All-Star (1963, 1964, 1965); 3× CFL West All-Star (1963, 1964, 1965)

Lovell Coleman (May 9, 1938 – August 10, 2016) was an American-born Canadian football player. He was born in Hamtramck, Michigan.

Coleman played his college football with the Western Michigan University Broncos from 1957 to 1959. He rushed for 1918 yards, including 1068 in the 1958 season. His 279-yard game versus Central Michigan University in 1958 is still a school record.

Drafted in 1960 by the Cleveland Browns of the National Football League (NFL) in the 17th round (199th pick). Coleman opted to play in the CFL.

The Calgary Stampeders were his home team for eight seasons, from 1960 to 1967. Coleman rushed for 6234 yards over this time, second only to Stampeder Earl Lunsford. The highlight of his time in Calgary was the 1964 season, when he rushed 260 times for a league-leading 1629 yards (6.3 average per carry.) This won him the CFL's Most Outstanding Player Award. His 1965 season was nearly as good, rushing 249 times for 1509 yards (6.1 average) but the only other time he led the league was in 1963, with 1343 yards. He was an All Canadian all star each of these years.

He holds the Stamps record for most rushing yards in one game, with 238 against the Hamilton Tiger-Cats on September 15, 1964. He also rushed for 224 yards against the Edmonton Eskimos on August 18, 1965.

Coleman moved on in 1968 to the Ottawa Rough Riders, where he won his first and only Grey Cup. He finished his career in 1970 playing 16 games for the British Columbia Lions.

In total, Coleman played 123 regular season and 26 playoff games in 10 seasons, rushing 1135 times for 6566 yards (5.8 yard average) and 42 touchdowns, with his longest run being 85 yards.

He was added to the Calgary Stampeders Wall of Fame as No. 22 in 1999. After his playing career, Coleman settled in Vancouver and ran a home renovation business for 20 years. Along with his wife Maureen, he later retired to a farm in rural British Columbia. He died on August 10, 2016, in Kamloops, British Columbia.
