= Kamar Jorden =

American gridiron football player (born 1989)

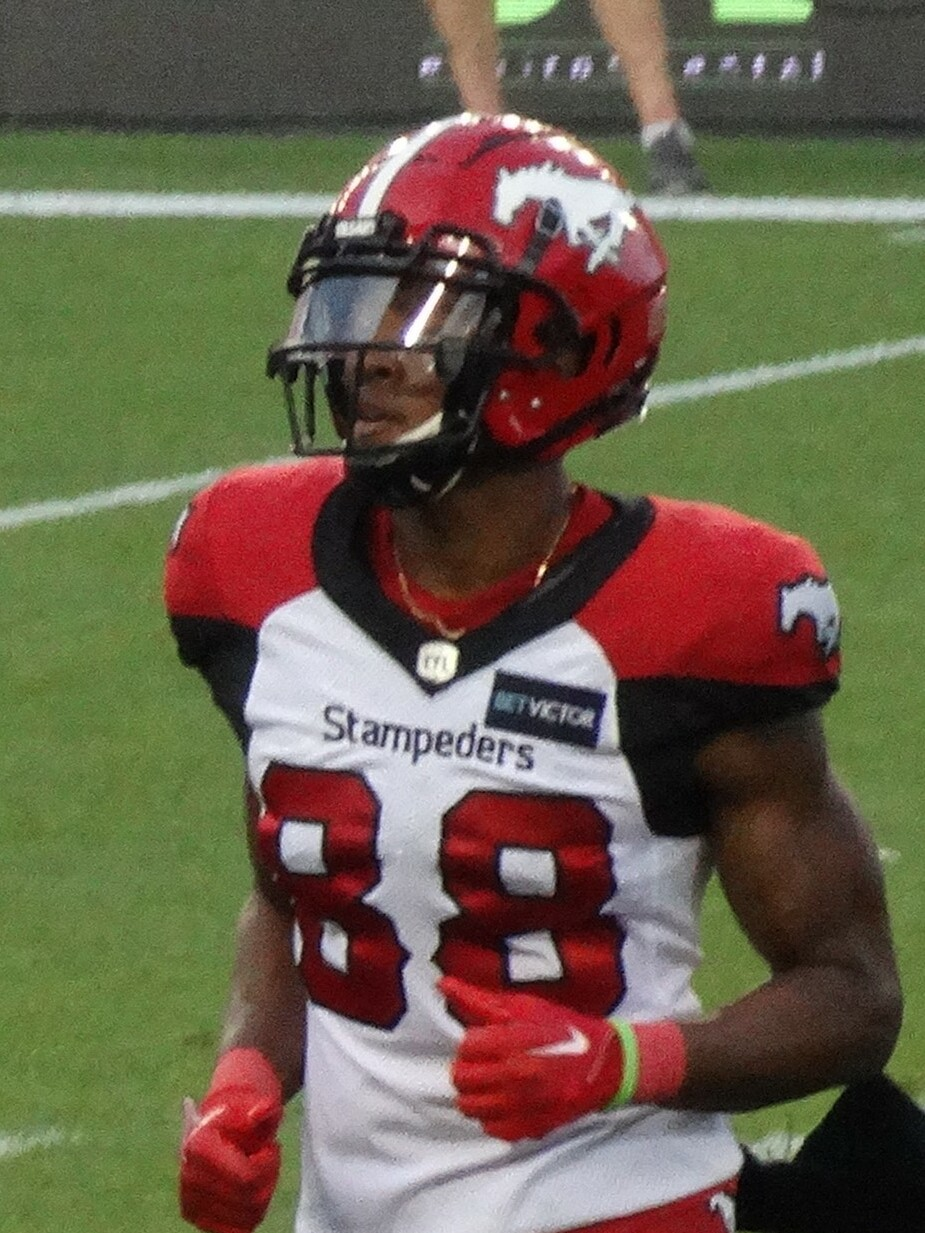
- Jorden with the Calgary Stampeders in 2022

Fairleigh Dickinson Devils
- Title: Special teams coordinator & wide receivers coach

Personal information
- Born: May 17, 1989 (age 37); Darby, Pennsylvania, U.S.
- Listed height: 6 ft 3 in (1.91 m)
- Listed weight: 205 lb (93 kg)

Career information
- Position: Wide receiver (No. 88)
- High school: Penn Wood
- College: Hudson Valley Community College, Bowling Green
- NFL draft: 2012: undrafted

Career history

Playing
- Minnesota Vikings (2012)*; Spokane Shock (2013); Calgary Stampeders (2013)*; Minnesota Vikings (2014)*; Calgary Stampeders (2014–2022)
- * Offseason or practice squad member only

Coaching
- Unionville HS (PA) (2023) Assistant coach; Albright (2025) Wide receivers coach; FDU–Florham (2026–present) Special teams coordinator & wide receivers coach

Awards and highlights
- 2× Grey Cup champion (2014, 2018); 2× CFL West All-Star (2018, 2021); 2× First-team All-MAC (2010, 2011); First-team All-NFC (2008); 2011 GoDaddy.com College Football Preseason All-American Honorable Mention; 2011 Biletnikoff Award Watch List; Hudson Valley Community College Hall of Fame

Career CFL statistics
- Receptions: 248
- Receiving yards: 3,454
- Receiving touchdowns: 19
- Stats at CFL.ca

Career AFL statistics
- Receptions: 95
- Receiving yards: 1,082
- Receiving touchdowns: 26
- Rushing touchdowns: 1
- Total tackles: 17
- Stats at ArenaFan.com
- Stats at Pro Football Reference

Kamar Isaias Jorden (born May 17, 1989) is an American college football coach and former professional wide receiver. He is the special teams coordinator and wide receivers coach for Fairleigh Dickinson University, positions he has held since 2026. He played college football for the Bowling Green Falcons. He was signed by the Minnesota Vikings as an undrafted free agent in 2012.

== College career ==
Jorden transferred to Bowling Green State University after playing two years at Hudson Valley Community College, where he set school records receptions and yards. In 2010, he earned First-team All-MAC in his first season with the Falcons while leading the MAC with 96 receptions and chipped in with 1,109 receiving yards and four touchdowns (both third-best in school history). Set a career-high 14 catches for 168 yards at Tulsa in Week 3. Had big games against Temple (12 balls for 143 yards), Ohio (8 catches for 129 yards and 2 touchdowns) and Western Michigan (8 catches for 114 yards and a score).

In 2011, he continued his success his senior year earning First-team All-MAC honors again becoming the first BGSU player since Kory Lichtensteiger in 2004 to be a back-to-back 1st Team All-MAC performer. Finished the year with 78 receptions for 1,089 yards and 12 touchdowns which was fourth-best in school history and made him the first Bowling Green receiver with multiple 1000 yard receiving seasons. Set a career-high 203 yards to go along with 12 catches at Kent State. Had 100-yard games versus Western Michigan (4–103), Toledo (7–106), Wyoming (9–101) and Northern Illinois (8–152). Caught touchdowns in nine different games and had at least four catches in 11 contests. Concluding his senior season he ended 8th All-Time on Bowling Green's Receptions leaders list in only two seasons.

== Professional career ==
=== Minnesota Vikings (first stint) ===
After going undrafted in the 2012 NFL draft Jorden signed with the Minnesota Vikings on April 29, 2012. However, he was unable to make the final roster after suffering an injury in training camp. He was released by the Vikings on August 27.

=== Spokane Shock ===
Jorden opted to play for the Spokane Shock of the Arena Football League (AFL) for their 2013 season (March–July). In one season in the AFL he caught 95 passes for 1,082 yards with 26 touchdowns.

=== Calgary Stampeders (first stint) ===
Following the conclusion of the 2013 AFL season, nearing the close of the CFL season, Jorden signed onto the practice roster of the Calgary Stampeders of the Canadian Football League. He did not dress in the remaining four games of the regular season and was released from the practice roster at season's end.

=== Minnesota Vikings (second stint) ===
Jorden signed a future/reserve contract with the Vikings on January 4, 2014, and a full contract on March 1, 2014. He was released prior to final roster cut down on August 25, 2014.

=== Calgary Stampeders (second stint) ===
Similar to a year prior, Jorden once again signed on with the Stampeders late in the 2014 CFL season. Jorden played in one game during the season, catching one pass for seven yards. In his second season in the league Jorden only played in two games, catching two passes for six yards. He was however a contributor in the Stamps pre-season games. Jorden and the Stamps agreed to a contract extension on January 12, 2016.

The 2016 season would prove to be a breakout year for Jorden as he played in nine games catching 42 passes for 580 yards with three touchdowns. In two post-season contests, Jorden had a total of 10 receptions for 127 yards and a catch for a two-point convert. Set to become a free-agent he was re-signed by the Stamps again in early January 2017. Jorden followed up his breakout 2016 season with a strong 2017 campaign, despite missing eight games with injury: He caught 52 passes for 717 yards with six touchdowns. He had a very strong performance in the playoffs as well, catching 12 passes for 228 yards and one touchdown in two games. However, Jorden's fumble late in the 105th Grey Cup game, returned 109 yards for an Argonaut touchdown, was arguably the turning point in a contest that found the Stampeders once again on the losing side. On December 15, 2017, the Stamps announced they had agreed to a contract extension with Jorden.

On August 25, 2018, Jordan set the Stampeders record for most receiving yards in a single game with 249, surpassing the previous record of 237 by Herm Harrison. Jordan had another exceptional season in 2018 and was second in the league in receiving yards (944) in early September when it was announced he would miss the remainder of the season with a torn ACL. Following the season, the Stamps and Jorden agreed to a two-year contract extension on January 18, 2019; which prevented him from becoming a free agent the following month. However, he did not play during the 2019 regular season due to the nature of his ACL injury and the recovery time. He managed to return to play in the 2019 West Semi-Final playoff game where he recorded two catches for 15 yards in the loss to the Winnipeg Blue Bombers. With the 2020 CFL season cancelled, Jorden was scheduled to become a free agent in 2021, but he signed another contract extension with the Stampeders on January 8, 2021.

Through the first six games of the 2021 CFL season Jorden led the league in receptions and receiving yards, before leaving the team's Week 7 game with a hamstring injury. Jordan returned to the active roster in Week 12. On January 26, 2022, he signed another contract extension with the Stampeders.

On September 9, 2022, he was placed on the 6-day injured list due to a thigh injury he suffered during a difficult 2022 CFL Season.

== Career statistics ==
=== AFL ===
Regular season

Season	Team	Games	Receiving				Rushing			
Season	Team	GP	Rec	Yds	Avg	TD	Att	Yds	Avg	TD
2013	Spokane	17	95	1,082	11.4	26	3	0	0.0	1
Career		17	95	1,082	11.4	26	3	0	0.0	1

Playoffs

Season	Team	Games	Receiving				Rushing			
Season	Team	GP	Rec	Yds	Avg	TD	Att	Yds	Avg	TD
2013	Spokane	2	6	75	12.5	2	—	—	—	—
Career		2	6	75	12.5	2	—	—	—	—

=== CFL ===
Regular season

Season	Team	Games		Receiving				Rushing			
Season	Team	GP	GS	Rec	Yds	Avg	TD	Att	Yds	Avg	TD
2014	CGY	1	0	1	7	7.0	0	—	—	—	—
2015	CGY	2	1	2	6	3.0	0	—	—	—	—
2016	CGY	9	0	42	580	13.8	3	1	6	6.0	0
2017	CGY	10	10	52	717	13.7	6	1	1	1.0	1
2018	CGY	10	10	55	944	17.1	6	—	—	—	—
2019	CGY	Did Not Play (injury—knee)									
2020	CGY	Season cancelled									
2021	CGY	11	11	53	767	14.4	4	—	—	—	—
2022	CGY	12	12	43	433	10.0	0	—	—	—	—
Career		55	44	248	3,454	13.9	19	2	7	3.5	1

=== College ===
Year	Team	GP	GS	Receiving			
Year	Team	GP	GS	Rec	Yards	Avg	TD
2007	Hudson Valley CC	10	10	17	242	14.2	1
2008	Hudson Valley CC	9	9	54	902	16.7	4
2009	Bowling Green	Redshirt (redshirt)					
2010	Bowling Green	12	12	96	1,109	11.6	4
2011	Bowling Green	12	12	78	1,089	14.0	12
Career		43	43	245	3,342	13.6	21

== Coaching career ==
In 2023, Jorden was an assistant coach for Unionville High School in Kennett Square, PA

In 2025, Jorden joined Albright College as the wide receivers coach.

Jorden signed with Athletes Untapped as a private football coach on Sep 10, 2025.
