= J. T. Hay =

Canadian gridiron football player (born 1954)

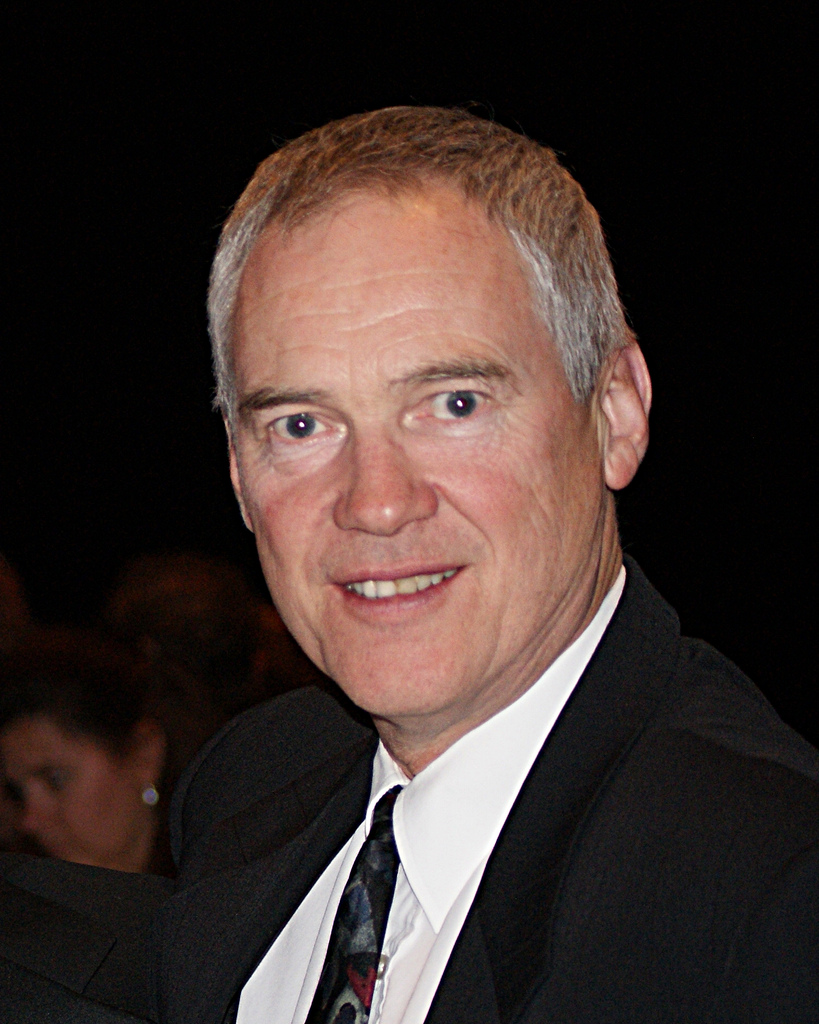
- Hay in 2010

No. 2
- Position: Kicker

Personal information
- Born: September 19, 1954 (age 72); Alexandria, Ontario
- Listed height: 6 ft 0 in (1.83 m)
- Listed weight: 175 lb (79 kg)

Career information
- Junior football: Ottawa Sooners

Career history
- 1978: Ottawa Rough Riders
- 1979–1988: Calgary Stampeders

Awards and highlights
- CFL West All-Star (1986); Glengarry Sports Hall of Fame (1991)

John Thomas Hay (born September 19, 1954) is a Canadian professional former placekicker for the Ottawa Rough Riders in 1978 and the Calgary Stampeders from 1979 to 1988 in the Canadian Football League.
