= Rae Ross =

Canadian football player

Profile
- Positions: End, Halfback, Defensive back

Personal information
- Born: c. 1931 (age 94–95); Winnipeg, Manitoba
- Died: 1993?
- Listed height: 6 ft 1 in (1.85 m)
- Listed weight: 185 lb (84 kg)

Career history
- 1955–1957: BC Lions
- 1958: Calgary Stampeders
- 1959–1960: Winnipeg Blue Bombers
- 1961: BC Lions

Rae Ross (born 1931) was a Canadian professional football player who played for the BC Lions, Calgary Stampeders, and Winnipeg Blue Bombers.
