= René Paredes =

Canadian gridiron football player (born 1985)

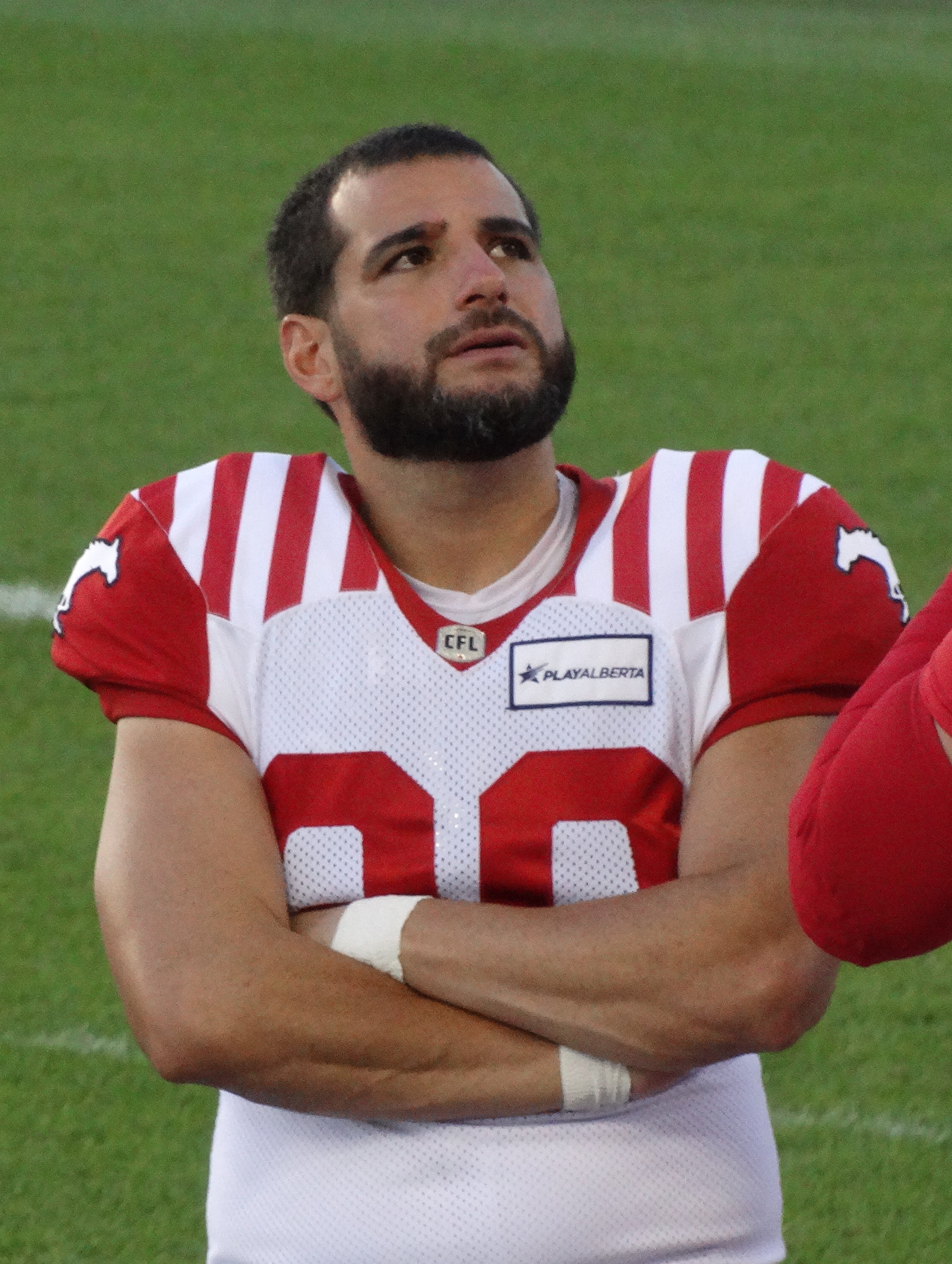
- Paredes with the Calgary Stampeders in 2024

No. 30
- Position: Placekicker

Personal information
- Born: May 15, 1985 (age 41); Caracas, Venezuela
- Listed height: 5 ft 11 in (1.80 m)
- Listed weight: 200 lb (91 kg)

Career information
- University: Concordia
- CFL draft: 2011: undrafted

Career history
- 2010: Winnipeg Blue Bombers*
- 2011: Winnipeg Blue Bombers*
- 2011–2026: Calgary Stampeders
- * Offseason or practice squad member only

Awards and highlights
- 2× Grey Cup champion (2014, 2018); 5× CFL All-Star (2012, 2013, 2015, 2021, 2022); 6× CFL West All-Star (2012, 2013, 2015, 2017, 2021, 2022); John Agro Special Teams Award (2013); 5× Dave Dryburgh Memorial Trophy (2013, 2014, 2015, 2021, 2022)

Career CFL statistics
- Games played: 255
- Field goals made: 656
- Field goals attempted: 749
- Field goal %: 87.6
- Points scored: 2,535
- Longest field goal: 62
- Stats at CFL.ca

René Paredes (born May 15, 1985) is a Canadian former professional football placekicker who played 15 seasons with the Calgary Stampeders of the Canadian Football League (CFL). He is a two-time Grey Cup champion after winning with the Stampeders in 2014 and 2018 and is a five-time CFL All-Star. He also won the John Agro Special Teams Award as the CFL's Most Outstanding Special Teams player in 2013.

== Early life ==
Paredes was born in Caracas, Venezuela and was raised in Pierrefonds, Quebec. He then played high school football in Miami, Florida.

== University career ==
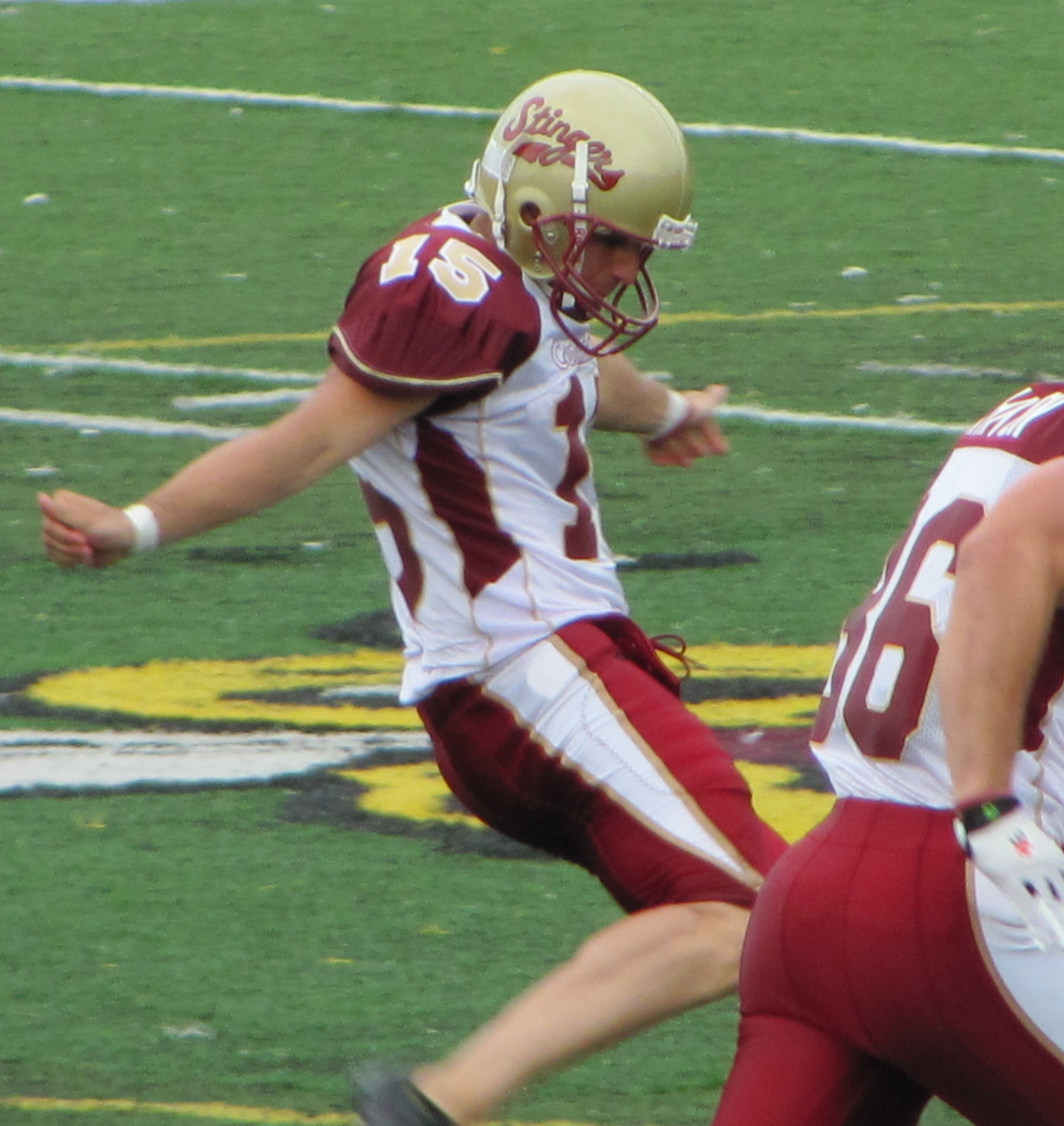
Paredes kicks during a game with the Stingers in 2010 against the Guelph Gryphons.

After graduating high school, Paredes returned to Montreal to play CIS football for the Concordia Stingers, where he played from 2007 to 2010. In those four years, he made 54 of 79 field goal attempts and 73 of 76 convert attempts. He also performed kickoffs for the team throughout his university career and was the team's punter in 2008 and 2009.

== Professional career ==
=== Winnipeg Blue Bombers ===
Paredes attended training camp with the Winnipeg Blue Bombers in 2010, but returned to university to play for the Stingers. In the following year, he was signed by the Blue Bombers on May 16, 2011, but was released after the preseason games on June 25, 2011.

=== Calgary Stampeders ===
The Calgary Stampeders' incumbent placekicker, Rob Maver, had suffered a quadriceps injury in the team's season opener in 2011, so the team signed Paredes on July 4, 2011, to replace him. Paredes had planned on returning to Concordia for his final season of eligibility, but instead played in his first professional regular season game on July 8, 2011, against the BC Lions. In that game, Paredes was successful on a 50-yard field goal as his first ever field goal attempt in the CFL. In that victory over the Lions, he made both field goal attempts and all four convert tries. He struggled in the next four games with misses in each game, but was able to consult with a sports psychologist during that time and he became more consistent thereafter. Despite Maver becoming healthy in September, Paredes remained as the team's field goal kicker and he finished the season having played in 17 regular season games where he made 35 of 45 field goal attempts with a 77.8% completion percentage. He was also the team's kickoff specialist where he had 88 kickoffs with a 60.1-yard average. In 2011, Paredes also played in his first post-season game where he made his career-longest field goal, at 52 yards, and was perfect on all three attempts in a West Semi-Final loss to the Edmonton Eskimos.

The 2012 CFL season saw Paredes establish himself as one of the most reliable kickers in the league. He opened the season as the Stampeders' placekicker while Maver became the team's punter following Burke Dales' departure in free agency. Paredes played in all 18 regular season games and was successful on 40 of his 43 field goal attempts, with the 93.0% field goal percentage ranking as the second best in CFL history. He also finished the regular season having connected of 18 consecutive tries. For his remarkable sophomore season, Paredes was named a CFL All-Star in 2012. He also played in all three of the Stampeders' post-season games, including his first Grey Cup with the 100th Grey Cup game, where he was eight-for-eight on field goal attempts in those games. He was also the team's nominee for the Most Outstanding Special Teams player in 2012.

Paredes signed a contract extension on January 10, 2013. He continued his outstanding play in 2013 as he built upon his streak of 18 straight field goals made from the previous year. On July 26, 2013, in a game versus the Blue Bombers, Paredes successfully converted five field goal attempts on his way to breaking the all-time Canadian Football League record for most consecutive field goal conversions previously held by Paul McCallum. Paredes entered the game with 29 consecutive field goal conversions, one behind McCallum's record, and finished the night with 34. His streak ended at 39 on August 23, 2013, against the Toronto Argonauts when he missed a 22-yard field goal. Because of his lengthy streak and continued strong play, Paredes missed just three field goals to finish with the best conversion percentage in a single CFL season, making 54 of 57 attempts for a record 94.7% conversion rate. Paredes was again named a Division All-Star, a CFL All-Star, and was also named the CFL's Most Outstanding Special Teams player. While both the consecutive field goal record and the single season percentage record were since broken in 2018 by Lewis Ward, Paredes' season still stands as one of the best by a placekicker in CFL history.

Following a record-breaking season, Paredes had a challenging year in 2014 as he connected on just 33 of his 45 field goal attempts for a 73.3% completion percentage, which is the worst of his career. He also missed a field goal in the post-season for the first time in his career in the West Final against the Eskimos. However, when it mattered the most, Paredes was perfect as he made both field goal attempts and both point-after-touchdown convert attempts in the 102nd Grey Cup game as the Stampeders defeated the Hamilton Tiger-Cats 20–16. He also punted for the first time as a professional in the second half of the championship game following an injury to Maver. Paredes' fourth quarter punt was returned for a touchdown that appeared to be the winning score for the Tiger-Cats, but was called back due to a penalty. Paredes won the first Grey Cup championship of his career.

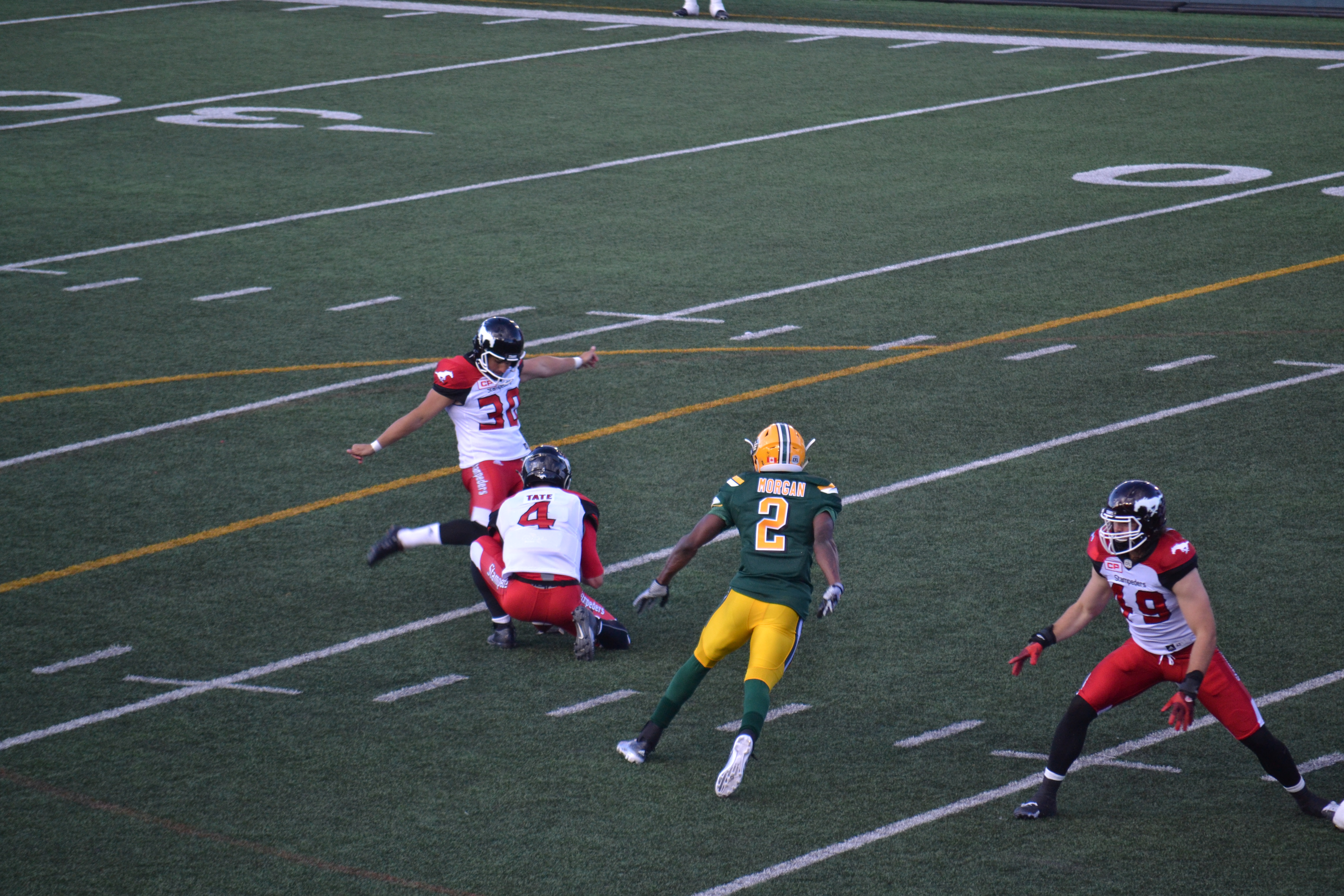
Paredes attempts a field goal against the Edmonton Eskimos in 2016.

In 2015, Paredes returned to form as he made 41 of 47 field goal attempts for an 87.2% completion rate. He also had a streak of 18 consecutive field goals made during the season and had three game-winning field goals. With convert attempts now being made from 32 yards away from the goal line, Paredes made 26 of 30 attempts. He also played in both playoff games for the Stampeders where he was successful on all six field goal tries and on both convert attempts. For the season, he was named a West Division All-Star and CFL All-Star and was named the West Division's Most Outstanding Special Teams Player.

Paredes continued to excel on a consistent basis in 2016 as he set a career high for field goal attempts (64) and field goals made (56). The 56 field goals was the fourth-highest ever made in a single season in CFL history. He also had an in-season consecutive field goal streak of 32, which was the longest of his career and is the third-longest overall streak in CFL history. In the playoffs, he made four-of-four field goal attempts and seven of eight conversion attempts, including a game-tying field goal to send the 104th Grey Cup championship to overtime, but the Stampeders lost the game to the Ottawa Redblacks. He signed a contract extension on December 9, 2016.

For the 2017 season, Paredes made 53 of 58 field goal attempts for the third-best percentage of his career (91.4%). He also played in his fourth Grey Cup game where he made his only field goal try and convert attempt, but the Stampeders lost the 105th Grey Cup to the Toronto Argonauts. At the end of the season, he was named a Divisional All-Star for the fourth time in his career.

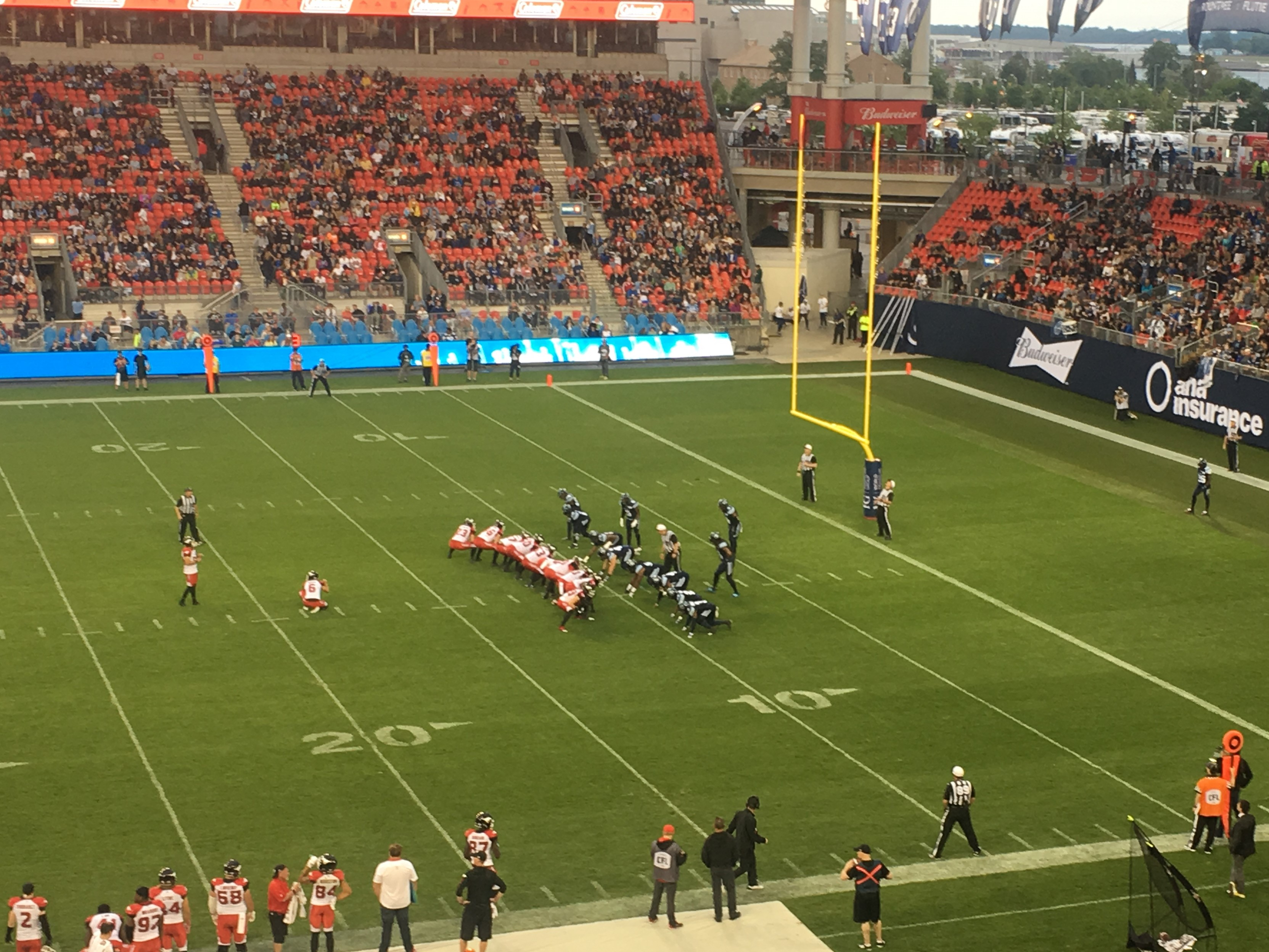
Paredes lines up for a field goal attempt against the Toronto Argonauts in 2018.

In 2018, he was successful on 41 of 45 field goal attempts for a 91.1% completion rate and made 36 of 39 point-after-touchdown attempts. Paredes played in his fifth Grey Cup in the 2018 championship where he made both of his field goal attempts and all three conversion kicks. With those two field goals, he made Grey Cup history having successfully made all 11 of his field goal kicks throughout five career appearances in the Grey Cup. The previous record was 9-for-9 and was held by former Toronto Argonauts kicker Mike Vanderjagt. Paredes won his second Grey Cup championship in the Stampeders' 27–16 victory over the Ottawa Redblacks.

Paredes had 43 field goals on 52 attempts in 2019 and set a career-high for convert percentage (from 32-yards out) with 96.8% after connecting on 30 of 31 attempts. This was the first season in his career that he neither attempted nor made a field goal in the post-season, but he made both covert attempts in the Stampeders' West Semi-Final loss to the Winnipeg Blue Bombers.

Paredes did not play in 2020 due to the cancellation of the 2020 CFL season. He then re-signed with the Stampeders on January 6, 2021. In 2021, he connected on 44 of 48 field goal attempts and had the best field goal percentage in the league en route to his fourth CFL All-Star Award. However, in the West Semi-Final game, he connected on just five of eight field goal attempts, including a 44-yard attempt in double overtime of a game that the Stampeders lost to the Saskatchewan Roughriders by a score of 33–30.

Entering the 2022 season, Paredes had made his last 19 regular season field goal attempts from the 2021 season. Through the first four games of 2022, he made another 11 consecutively before missing a 38-yard field goal attempt on July 7, 2022. His 30 consecutive field goals spanning the 2021 and 2022 seasons was tied for the fourth longest streak in CFL history. Paredes also made a career-long field goal attempt of 53 yards on July 30, 2022, against the Winnipeg Blue Bombers, which he repeated two weeks later against the BC Lions. He finished the year having made 54 of 60 field goal attempts, which was tied with the second-most single season field goals in his career and also led the league that year. At the end of the season, Paredes was named a CFL All-Star for the fifth time in his career.

In 2023, Paredes had another strong year where he kicked 20 consecutive field goals from July to August and finished the year having made 52 of 60 field goal attempts. He also matched his single-game career high of six field goals made in a game, having done so twice. Paredes set a career high of six field goals made of 50 yards or longer for the season. He also had the strongest defensive season of his career as he recorded a career high four special teams tackles and his first forced fumble.

In the 2024 season, Paredes had the second-best field goal success rate of his career, at 93.2, as he connected on 41 of 44 field goal attempts. In the week one game against the Hamilton Tiger-Cats, he tied a career high with six field goals made in a game, which was the fifth time he had accomplished the feat. In the Labour Day Classic against the Edmonton Elks, he made a career-long 57-yard field goal, surpassing his previous best of 53 yards. During the week 16 game against the Saskatchewan Roughriders, he moved into sole possession of second place in Stampeders history with his 225th game played for the franchise. On December 11, 2024, he signed a two-year extension with the team, avoiding free agency.

As of the 2026 CFL season, Parades is known as the oldest active player in the CFL at 41. On September 20, 2026, he kicked a game-winning field goal from 62 yards out, one yard shy of the CFL record, in a victory over the Ottawa Redblacks. He retired after the 2026 season.
