= James Sykes (Canadian football) =

American gridiron football player (born 1954)

No. 11
- Position: Running back

Personal information
- Born: November 7, 1954 (age 71); New Waverly, Texas, U.S.

Career information
- College: Rice
- NFL draft: 1977: 10th round, 273rd overall pick

Career history
- 1977–1983: Calgary Stampeders
- 1983, 1986: Winnipeg Blue Bombers

Awards and highlights
- 2× Eddie James Memorial Trophy (1980, 1981); 2× CFL All-Star (1978, 1980); Second-team All-SWC (1976)

James Sykes (born November 7, 1954) is an American former professional football running back in the Canadian Football League (CFL) for the Calgary Stampeders from 1977 through 1982, and the Winnipeg Blue Bombers in 1983 and 1986. He was an All-Star in 1978 and 1980. He won the Eddie James Memorial Trophy in 1980 and 1981.

== Career regular season rushing statistics ==
Year	Team	GP	Rush	Yards	Y/R	Lg	TD
1978	Calgary Stampeders	15	204	1020	5.0	31	13
1979	Calgary Stampeders	12	151	703	4.7	38	5
1980	Calgary Stampeders	16	222	1263	5.7	75	10
1981	Calgary Stampeders	15	240	1107	4.6	68	6
1982	Calgary Stampeders	15	193	1046	5.4	84	11
1983	Calgary Stampeders	4	37	222	6.0	24	0
1983	Winnipeg Blue Bombers	1	12	62	5.2	15	0
1986	Winnipeg Blue Bombers	7	97	447	4.6	57	3
	CFL totals		1156	5870	5.1	84	48
