= Kelvin Anderson =

American gridiron football player (born 1972)

No. 32
- Position: Running back

Personal information
- Born: February 4, 1972 (age 54); South Bend, Indiana, U.S.

Career information
- College: Southeast Missouri State

Career history
- 1996–2002: Calgary Stampeders
- 2001: San Francisco Demons
- 2003: BC Lions

Awards and highlights
- 2× Grey Cup champion (1998, 2001); 2× Jeff Nicklin Memorial Trophy (1998, 2001); 2× Eddie James Memorial Trophy (2000, 2001); CFL Rookie of the Year (1996); Jackie Parker Trophy (1996); 3× CFL All-Star (1998, 1999, 2001); 5× CFL West All-Star (1997–2001)
- Canadian Football Hall of Fame (Class of 2017)

Kelvin Anderson (born February 4, 1972) is an American former professional football player. As a running back, he rushed for over 1,000 yards in eight consecutive seasons in the Canadian Football League (CFL), a league record. He won the CFL's Grey Cup championship twice, as a member of the Calgary Stampeders, in 1998 and 2001.

Anderson played football at New Madrid County Central High School. He played college football at Southeast Missouri State where he earned the nickname "Earthquake". Anderson's eight consecutive 1,000 yard seasons began in 1996 with the Calgary Stampeders. In 2000, he played in 15 games for Calgary, and ran for 1,048 yards and scored six touchdowns. He caught 34 passes for 283 yards and two touchdowns, and captured the Eddie James Memorial Trophy as the Western Division's top rusher. In 2001 he was named a Western All-Star for the fifth consecutive season, and was named a CFL All-Star for the third time in his career, and ran for a career-high 1,383 yards and six touchdowns. Anderson also caught 48 passes for 433 yards and nine touchdowns. Anderson also played in the only XFL season in 2001 for the San Francisco Demons, leading the team in rushing with 228 yards.

Anderson had played all of his CFL career with the Calgary Stampeders when he was released by them prior to the 2003 season in favor of Lawrence Phillips. Anderson signed with the BC Lions, following head coach and general manager Wally Buono who had also been let go by Calgary. With the Lions in 2003, he rushed for over 1,000 yards for the eighth consecutive season, setting a league record. He retired just prior the 2004 CFL season. Antonio Warren succeeded him as the Lions' starting running back.

Anderson was inducted to the Canadian Football Hall of Fame in 2017.

== Career regular season rushing statistics ==
Year	Team	GP	Rush	Yards	Y/R	Lg	TD
1996	Calgary Stampeders	18	240	1,068	4.5	49	10
1997	Calgary Stampeders	18	246	1,088	4.4	34	9
1998	Calgary Stampeders	18	236	1,325	5.6	44	9
1999	Calgary Stampeders	18	262	1,308	5.0	39	8
2000	Calgary Stampeders	18	203	1,048	5.2	49	6
2001	Calgary Stampeders	17	262	1,383	5.3	46	6
2001	San Francisco Demons	-	53	231	4.4	39	1
2002	Calgary Stampeders	18	221	1,074	4.9	40	4
2003	BC Lions	17	188	1,048	5.6	52	6
	CFL Totals	188	1858	9340	5.0	52	58
