= Earl Lunsford =

American gridiron football player (1933–2008)

No. 27
- Position: Running back

Personal information
- Born: October 19, 1933; Stillwater, Oklahoma, U.S.
- Died: September 3, 2008 (aged 74); Fort Worth, Texas, U.S.
- Listed height: 5 ft 11 in (1.80 m)
- Listed weight: 200 lb (91 kg)

Career information
- College: Oklahoma State
- NFL draft: 1956: 26th round, 305th overall pick

Career history

Playing
- 1956, 1959–1963: Calgary Stampeders

Operations
- 1968–1982: Winnipeg Blue Bombers
- 1985–1987: Calgary Stampeders

Awards and highlights
- 2× Eddie James Memorial Trophy (1960, 1961); 2× CFL All-Star (1961, 1962); 3× CFL West All-Star (1960, 1961, 1962)

Career CFL statistics
- Games played: 85
- Rushing yards: 6,994
- Rushing touchdowns: 55
- Receptions: 54
- Receiving yards: 528
- Canadian Football Hall of Fame (Class of 1983)

Earl Lunsford (October 19, 1933 – September 3, 2008), known as the "Earthquake", was a fullback for the Calgary Stampeders and is a member of the Canadian Football Hall of Fame.

== College football ==
Lunsford played during college at with Oklahoma A&M.

== Calgary ==
Lunsford was drafted 305th overall in the 26th round by the Philadelphia Eagles of the National Football League in 1956, but instead began his six-year career in the Canadian Football League that year with the Calgary Stampeders. His time in Calgary was interrupted for 2 seasons, 1957 to 1958, while serving in the United States military. He played 5 more seasons for the Stamps, from 1959 to 1963.

Lunsford rushed for over 1,000 yards 5 times, leading the West Division with 1,343 yards in 1960. During his best season, 1961, he led the entire CFL with a whopping 1,794 yards, which made him known as the first running back in professional sports to rush for a mile in one season. He was an All West all star in 1960 and All Canadian in 1961. That year, Calgary finished with a mediocre 7-9 record, but defeated the Edmonton Eskimos in the Western conference semi-final. However, they lost the Western conference final to the eventual Grey Cup winner, the Bud Grant-led Winnipeg Blue Bombers. His best game was on September 3, 1962, in Calgary, when he scored 5 rushing touchdowns, still a Stampeder record.

In his career, he rushed 1199 times for 6994 yards, a 5.8 yard average, and 55 touchdowns, with his longest run being 85 yards. He is the Stampeder all-time rushing leader with 55 touchdowns and 28 100-yard games and is second among Stampeders for all-time rushing yards.

Earl Lunsford had his own theme song "Earl The Pearl of Calgary".

== Career regular season rushing statistics ==
Year	Team	GP	Rush	Yards	Y/R	Lg	TD
1956	Calgary Stampeders	16	216	1283	5.9	57	7
1957-1958	Military Service						
1959	Calgary Stampeders	16	183	1027	5.6	22	10
1960	Calgary Stampeders	16	214	1343	6.3	85	13
1961	Calgary Stampeders	16	296	1794	6.1	62	10
1962	Calgary Stampeders	11	180	1016	5.6	64	8
1963	Calgary Stampeders	10	110	531	4.8	29	7
	CFL Totals		1199	6994	5.8	85	55

== General manager ==
After his playing career, Lunsford became General Manager of the Winnipeg Blue Bombers (1968–1982) and the Calgary Stampeders (1985–1987).

== Post-football honors ==
For his outstanding years as a dominant running back, Lunsford was elected to the Canadian Football Hall of Fame in 1983.

== Death ==
He died September 3, 2008, aged 74, of Alzheimer's disease at his Texas home.
