= List of BC Lions first-round draft picks =

The following is a complete list of first-round draft picks selected by the BC Lions of the Canadian Football League. The Lions began participating in the Canadian College Draft in 1956 when western teams were permitted to make selections. From 1960-1962, only eastern teams and the Calgary Stampeders participated in the draft as the other western clubs signed players from universities in their area. This list also includes all territorial exemptions from 1973, when teams were first permitted to selected players within their designated area, until 1985 when these exemptions were abolished.

The BC Lions have had the first overall selection in the draft seven times, most recently in the 2020 CFL draft. Since 1966, the Lions have only ever lost their first round pick six times, in the 1959, 1963, 1966, 1997, 2014, and 2019 CFL drafts, due to trades. Not including territorial exemptions, the most first-round picks the Lions have had in one year is three, which first occurred in the 2006 CFL draft and then again in the 2009 CFL draft.

== Player selections ==
= CFL Division All-Star	= CFL All-Star	= Hall of Famer

Year	Pick	Player name	Position	College	Notes
1956	4	Al Kochman	Halfback	Queen's	
1957	1	Jim Hughes	Tackle	Queen's	
1957	2	Ed Skrzypek	Quarterback	Toronto	
1958	3	Bill Britton	Halfback	Western Ontario	
1959	-	No pick	-	-	Traded to Hamilton
1960	-	Did not participate	-	-	
1961	-	Did not participate	-	-	
1962	-	Did not participate	-	-	
1963	-	No pick	-	-	
1964	9	Dick Aldridge	Halfback	Waterloo	
1965	9	Bayne Norrie	Halfback	Queen's	
1966	-	No pick	-	-	Traded to Calgary for Roy Shatzko
1967	2	Dick Kohler	End/Placekicker	Manitoba	
1968	1	Mike Eben	Wide receiver	Toronto	
1969	7	Ted Warkentin	End	Simon Fraser	
1970	3	John McManus	End	Alberta	
1971	3	Archie McCord	Offensive lineman	Simon Fraser	
1972	3	Steve Szapka	Offensive lineman	Simon Fraser	
1973	Ex	Harold Grozdanich	Offensive lineman	Boise State	
1973	Ex	Robbie Allen	Offensive lineman	Bishop's	
1973	Ex	Ross Clarkson	Wide receiver	Simon Fraser	
1973	1	Brian Sopatyk	Offensive lineman	Boise State	
1974	Ex	Terry Bailey	Running back	Simon Fraser	
1974	Ex	Lorne Sherbina	Defensive tackle	Idaho	
1974	4	Bob Hornes	Defensive back	Idaho State	
1975	Ex	Barry Houlihan	Running back	Simon Fraser	
1975	Ex	Mark McDonald	Wide receiver	Washington	
1976	Ex	Bill Norton	Defensive tackle	Weber State	
1976	Ex	Glen Jackson	Linebacker	Simon Fraser	
1976	Ex	Mitch Davies	Defensive end	Calgary	
1976	2	Randy Graham	Defensive back	Simon Fraser	
1976	5	Lui Passaglia	Wide receiver	Simon Fraser	
1977	Ex	John Blain	Offensive tackle	San Jose State	
1978	Ex	John Blake	Offensive guard	San Jose State	
1978	Ex	Phil Luke	Defensive end	Simon Fraser	
1978	6	Rick Goltz	Defensive tackle	Simon Fraser	
1979	Ex	Nick Hebeler	Defensive tackle	Simon Fraser	
1979	Ex	Ron Morehouse	Linebacker	San Diego State	
1979	3	Mark Houghton	Running back	California	
1980	Ex	Derek Innes	Linebacker	Simon Fraser	
1980	Ex	John Pankratz	Wide receiver	Simon Fraser	
1980	5	Kevin Konar	Linebacker	British Columbia	
1981	Ex	Rob Smith	Offensive lineman	Utah State	
1981	Ex	Rick Klassen	Defensive lineman	Simon Fraser	
1981	5	Nelson Martin	Defensive back	Seneca	
1982	Ex	Dennis Guevin	Offensive lineman	Simon Fraser	
1982	Ex	Gerald Roper	Offensive lineman	Simon Fraser	
1982	5	Bernie Glier	Defensive back	British Columbia	
1983	Ex	Jim Mills	Offensive lineman	Hawaii	
1983	5	Jacques Chapdelaine	Wide receiver	Simon Fraser	
1984	Ex	Laurent DesLauriers	Linebacker	British Columbia	
1984	1	Frank Balkovec	Defensive end	Toronto	
1985	3	John Ulmer	Running back	North Dakota	
1986	9	Paul Nastasiuk	Running back	Wilfrid Laurier	
1987	4	Tony Visco	Defensive lineman	Purdue	
1988	7	Tony Martino	Punter	Kent State	
1989	6	Derek MacCready	Defensive end	Ohio State	
1990	2	Ian Beckles	Offensive lineman	Indiana	
1991	4	Bart Hull	Running back	Boise State	
1992	4	Lorne King	Running back	Toronto	
1993	1	Patrick Burke	Defensive back	Fresno State	
1994	6	Trevor Shaw	Wide receiver	Weber State	
1995	8	Mark Hatfield	Offensive tackle	Bishop's	
1996	6	Mike Pimiskern	Linebacker	Washington State	
1997	-	No pick	-	-	
1998	3	Steve Hardin	Offensive lineman	Oregon	
1999	1	Rob Meier	Defensive end	Washington State	
1999	3	Greg Lotysz	Offensive lineman	North Dakota	
2000	6	Adriano Belli	Defensive lineman	Houston	
2001	2	Ian Williams	Linebacker	Memphis	
2001	8	Lyle Green	Fullback	Toledo	
2002	4	Jason Clermont	Slotback	Regina	
2002	6	Paul Cheng	Defensive end	Simon Fraser	
2003	6	Paris Jackson	Wide receiver	Utah	
2004	5	Oshiomogho Atogwe	Safety	Stanford	
2005	8	Alexis Bwenge	Running back	Kentucky	
2006	2	Jason Pottinger	Linebacker	McMaster	
2006	4	Ricky Foley	Linebacker	York	
2006	6	Dean Valli	Offensive tackle	Simon Fraser	
2007	8	Adam Nicolson	Wide receiver	Ottawa	
2008	5	Justin Sorensen	Offensive lineman	South Carolina	
2009	3	Jamall Lee	Running back	Bishop's	
2009	4	James Yurichuk	Linebacker	Bishop's	
2009	5	Matt Carter	Slotback	Acadia	
2010	4	Danny Watkins	Offensive tackle	Baylor	
2011	6	Marco Iannuzzi	Wide receiver	Harvard	
2012	2	Jabar Westerman	Defensive lineman	Eastern Michigan	
2012	7	Kirby Fabien	Offensive lineman	Calgary	
2013	6	Hunter Steward	Offensive lineman	Liberty	
2014	-	No pick	-	-	Traded to Ottawa for Kevin Glenn
2015	5	Ese Mrabure-Ajufo	Defensive lineman	Wilfrid Laurier	
2016	5	Charles Vaillancourt	Offensive lineman	Laval	
2017	3	Daniel Vandervoort	Wide receiver	McMaster	
2017	7	Junior Luke	Defensive lineman	Montreal	
2018	3	Peter Godber	Offensive lineman	Rice	
2018	7	Julien Laurent	Defensive lineman	Georgia State	
2019	-	No pick	-	-	Traded to Winnipeg for 2018 pick
2020	1	Jordan Williams	Linebacker	East Carolina	
2021	4	Daniel Joseph	Defensive lineman	North Carolina State	
2022	3	Nathan Cherry	Defensive lineman	Saskatchewan	
2023	9	Francis Bemiy	Defensive lineman	Southern Utah	
2024	6	George Una	Offensive lineman	Windsor	
2025	-	No pick			Forfeited due to exceeding salary cap
2026	7	Nate DeMontagnac	Wide receiver	North Dakota	
