= Canadian college drafts (1956–1969) =

Historical Canadian Football League drafts

The following is a list of first round selections from Canadian college drafts from 1956 to 1969, which are annual sports drafts in which the teams of the Canadian Football League (CFL) selected eligible Canadian/non-import players, typically from the ranks of Canadian Interuniversity Sport football or NCAA college football. Member clubs made selections based on the reverse order of the previous year's standings, with the team with the worst record being awarded the first selection. Prior to 1956, only Interprovincial Rugby Football Union clubs participated in the draft while the Western Interprovincial Football Union not only chose by territorial rights, but would also try to sign away players that were drafted by eastern clubs. To create a level playing field, the Canadian Football Council was formed which later evolved into the Canadian Football League. Following the creation of the CFC, all nine member clubs participated in the 1956 draft. The order of selection was determined by reverse record with the losing conference picking first.

== 1956 Canadian college draft ==
The 1956 Canadian college draft took place in the spring of 1956. 34 players were chosen from among eligible players from five eastern universities, McGill University, Queen's University, University of Toronto, University of Western Ontario, and McMaster University.

Pick #	CFL team	Player	Position	University
1	Ottawa Rough Riders	Lou Bruce	E	Queen's
2	Calgary Stampeders	Phil Muntz	FB	Toronto
3	Hamilton Tiger-Cats	Don Cheeseman	FB	Toronto
4	BC Lions	Al Kocman	HB	Queen's
5	Toronto Argonauts	Fred Smale	E	Toronto
6	Winnipeg Blue Bombers	John Bodrug	G	Toronto
7	Saskatchewan Roughriders	Doug Drew	C/G	Western Ontario
8	Montreal Alouettes	Ted Collins	G	Western Ontario
9	Edmonton Eskimos	Bobby Waugh	G	Toronto

== 1957 Canadian college draft ==
The 1957 Canadian college draft took place in the spring of 1957. 35 players were chosen from among eligible players from five eastern universities, McGill University, Queen's University, University of Toronto, University of Western Ontario, and McMaster University.

Pick #	CFL team	Player	Position	University
1	BC Lions	Jim Hughes	T	Queen's
2	BC Lions	Ed Skrzypek	QB	Toronto
3	Ottawa Rough Riders	Russ Radchuk	G	Queen's
4	BC Lions	George Rawlyk	C/G	McMaster
5	Hamilton Tiger-Cats	John Larsen	T	McGill
6	Winnipeg Blue Bombers	Murdy Armstrong	HB	McGill
7	Calgary Stampeders	Norm Williams	HB	Toronto
8	Calgary Stampeders	Santo Martini	T	Toronto
9	Edmonton Eskimos	David McIntyre	C/G	Toronto

== 1958 CFL draft ==
The 1958 CFL draft took place in the spring of 1958. 35 players were chosen from among eligible players from five eastern universities, McGill University, Queen's University, University of Toronto, University of Western Ontario, and McMaster University.

Pick #	CFL team	Player	Position	University
1	Saskatchewan Roughriders	Len Sigurdson	T	McGill
2	Toronto Argonauts	Paul Fedor	EFB	Queen's
3	BC Lions	Bill Britton	HB	Western Ontario
4	Montreal Alouettes	Ron Murphy	E	McGill
5	Calgary Stampeders	Willie Casanova	HB	McMaster
6	Ottawa Rough Riders	Russ Jackson	HB	McMaster
7	Winnipeg Blue Bombers	John Sandzelius	HB	McGill
8	Hamilton Tiger-Cats	John Cronin	HB	McGill
9	Edmonton Eskimos	John Tattle	HB	Toronto

== 1959 CFL draft ==
The 1959 CFL draft took place in the spring of 1959. 22 players were chosen from among eligible players from five eastern universities, McGill University, Queen's University, University of Toronto, University of Western Ontario, and McMaster University.

Pick #	CFL team	Player	Position	University
1	Toronto Argonauts	Lorrey Stacey	DE	Toronto
2	Hamilton Tiger-Cats	Tim Reid	HB	Toronto
3	Montreal Alouettes	Bob Miller	HB	Western Ontario
4	Ottawa Rough Riders	Jocko Thompson	K/HB	Queen's
5	Hamilton Tiger-Cats	David Bates	T	McMaster
6	Saskatchewan Roughriders	Doug MacKenzie	HB	Western Ontario
7	Edmonton Eskimos	Julian Porter	T	Toronto
8	Hamilton Tiger-Cats	Bob Aitchison	C/G	McMaster
9	Winnipeg Blue Bombers	Duncan Brodie	HB	Toronto

== 1960 CFL draft ==
The 1960 CFL draft took place in the spring of 1960. 24 players were chosen from among eligible players from five eastern universities, McGill University, Queen's University, University of Toronto, University of Western Ontario, and McMaster University. Beginning in 1960, western teams reverted to selecting players based on territorial rights from the university programs in their cities/provinces. Because the University of Calgary did not have a football program at this time, the Calgary Stampeders continued to participate in the draft with the eastern teams.

Pick #	CFL team	Player	Position	University
1	Toronto Argonauts	Bill Mitchell	T	Western Ontario
2	Montreal Alouettes	Meco Poliziani	FB	Western Ontario
3	Montreal Alouettes	Lionel Conacher Jr.	FB	Western Ontario
4	Ottawa Rough Riders	Steve Chisholm	HB	Toronto
5	Hamilton Tiger-Cats	Frank Cosentino	QB	Western Ontario

== 1961 CFL draft ==
The 1961 CFL draft took place in the spring of 1961. 24 players were chosen from among eligible players from five eastern universities, McGill University, Queen's University, University of Toronto, University of Western Ontario, and McMaster University.

Pick #	CFL team	Player	Position	University
1	Toronto Argonauts	Casey Wood	T	Toronto
2	Calgary Stampeders	Glenn Harding	C	Toronto
3	Hamilton Tiger-Cats	John Ware	C	Queen's
4	Toronto Argonauts	Mike Wicklum	HB	Queen's
5	Ottawa Rough Riders	Paul Burroughs	HB	Toronto

== 1962 CFL draft ==
The 1962 CFL draft took place in the spring of 1962. 38 players were chosen from among eligible players from five eastern universities, McGill University, Queen's University, University of Toronto, University of Western Ontario, and McMaster University.

Pick #	CFL team	Player	Position	University
1	Calgary Stampeders	Harvey Scott	LB/G	Western Ontario
2	Toronto Argonauts	Gary Strickler	LB	Queen's
3	Calgary Stampeders	Doug Boyd	FB	Toronto
4	Ottawa Rough Riders	Chuck Wood	G	McGill
5	Hamilton Tiger-Cats	Brian Cooper	HB	Toronto

== 1963 CFL draft ==
The 1963 CFL draft took place in the spring of 1963. The draft was expanded to include all nine teams again in 1963 and all players from degree-granting schools in Canada were eligible for the draft. 71 players were chosen from among eligible players from these schools.

Pick #	CFL team	Player	Position	University
1	Toronto Argonauts	John Wydareny	HB	Western Ontario
2	Hamilton Tiger-Cats	Ken Rysdale	QB	Western Ontario
3	Edmonton Eskimos	Pete Howlett	FB	Loyola
4	Ottawa Rough Riders	Rick Black	HB	Mount Allison
5	Ottawa Rough Riders	Peter Quinn	HB	Queen's
6	Ottawa Rough Riders	Bill Miklas	G	Queen's
7	Saskatchewan Roughriders	James Hogan	T	McGill
8	Calgary Stampeders	Roy Shatzko	G	British Columbia
9	Winnipeg Blue Bombers	Ian Monteith	FB	McGill

== 1964 CFL draft ==
The 1964 CFL draft took place in the spring of 1964. 58 players were chosen from among eligible players from degree-granting schools in Canada.

Pick #	CFL team	Player	Position	University
1	Edmonton Eskimos	Barry Mitchelson	E	Western Ontario
2	Toronto Argonauts	Bill Watters	FB	Toronto
3	Winnipeg Blue Bombers	Jack Cowin	T	Western Ontario
4	Montreal Alouettes	Al Irwin	E	McMaster
5	Calgary Stampeders	Mike Hollett	E	Toronto
6	Ottawa Rough Riders	Peter Martin	FB	Western Ontario
7	Calgary Stampeders	Bill Edwards	HB	Queen's
8	Hamilton Tiger-Cats	Paul Desjardins	C	Ottawa
9	BC Lions	Dick Aldridge	HB	Waterloo

== 1965 CFL draft ==
The 1965 CFL draft took place in the spring of 1965. 60 players were chosen from among eligible players from degree-granting schools in Canada.

Pick #	CFL team	Player	Position	University
1	Toronto Argonauts	Jim Young	HB	Queen's
2	Winnipeg Blue Bombers	Paul Desjardins	T	Ottawa
3	Hamilton Tiger-Cats	Ken Nielsen	HB	Alberta
4	Hamilton Tiger-Cats	Doug Bucknam	E	Toronto
5	Hamilton Tiger-Cats	Bob Apps	HB	McMaster
6	Ottawa Rough Riders	Brian Bentley	C	Mount Allison
7	Calgary Stampeders	Brian Conacher	HB	Western Ontario
8	Hamilton Tiger-Cats	Tom Beynon	T	Queen's
9	BC Lions	Bayne Norrie	HB	Queen's

== 1966 CFL draft ==
The 1966 CFL draft took place in the spring of 1966. 63 players were chosen from among eligible players from degree-granting schools in Canada.

Pick #	CFL team	Player	Position	University
1	Edmonton Eskimos	Ed Turek	HB	Waterloo Lutheran
2	Toronto Argonauts	Ross Nicholson	T	Western Ontario
3	Calgary Stampeders	Mike Williams	HB	Loyola
4	Saskatchewan Roughriders	Vern Simonsen	E	Alberta
5	Montreal Alouettes	Jim Greenwood	T	Queen's
6	Ottawa Rough Riders	Glen Markle	DB	Toronto
7	Winnipeg Blue Bombers	Tom Feasby	HB	Manitoba
8	Calgary Stampeders	Fred James	T	Alberta
9	Hamilton Tiger-Cats	Steve Ostapchuk	HB	McMaster

== 1967 CFL draft ==
The 1967 CFL draft took place in the spring of 1967. 44 players were chosen from among eligible players from degree-granting schools in Canada.

Pick #	CFL team	Player	Position	University
1	Toronto Argonauts	Lawrence Barrett	HB	British Columbia
2	BC Lions	Dick Kohler	E/K	Manitoba
3	Hamilton Tiger-Cats	Al Scanlon	HB	Ottawa
4	Hamilton Tiger-Cats	Laird Elliott	C	Toronto
5	Edmonton Eskimos	Robbie Campbell	HB	Alberta
6	Hamilton Tiger-Cats	Jim Kellam	T	Toronto
7	Winnipeg Blue Bombers	Ed Molstad	E	Alberta
8	Ottawa Rough Riders	Greg McQueen	HB	Waterloo
9	Winnipeg Blue Bombers	Bob Howard	E	McMaster

== 1968 CFL draft ==
The 1968 CFL draft took place in the spring of 1968. 73 players were chosen from among eligible players from degree-granting schools in Canada.

Pick #	CFL team	Player	Position	University
1	BC Lions	Mike Eben	FL	Toronto
2	Ottawa Rough Riders	Paul Brule	HB	St. Francis Xavier
3	Winnipeg Blue Bombers	Pierre Guindon	T	Ottawa
4	Edmonton Eskimos	Larry Planke	FL	Queen's
5	Toronto Argonauts	Chuck Liebrock	G	Saint Mary's
6	Ottawa Rough Riders	Darryl Burgess	LB	Saint Mary's
7	Ottawa Rough Riders	Ron Wakelin	G	Toronto
8	Saskatchewan Roughriders	Pete Gilbert	C	Alberta
9	Ottawa Rough Riders	Don Cooper	C/LB	Bishop's

== 1969 CFL draft ==
The 1969 CFL draft took place in the spring of 1969. 67 players were chosen from among eligible players from degree-granting schools in Canada.

Pick #	CFL team	Player	Position	University
1	Winnipeg Blue Bombers	Doug Strong	HB	Waterloo Lutheran
2	Winnipeg Blue Bombers	Rob McLaren	LB	Simon Fraser
3	Saskatchewan Roughriders	Skip Eaman	HB	Queen's
4	Edmonton Eskimos	Dave Cutler	LB/K	Simon Fraser
5	Hamilton Tiger-Cats	John Krawczyk	DB	McMaster
6	Saskatchewan Roughriders	Alex Squires	DE	Toronto
7	BC Lions	Ted Warkentin	E	Simon Fraser
8	Calgary Stampeders	Brent Gilbert	T	Waterloo
9	Ottawa Rough Riders	Jim Foley	QB	St. Dunstan's
