= List of first overall CFL draft picks =

This is a list of first overall Canadian Football League draft picks. The CFL draft is an annual sports draft in which the teams of the Canadian Football League (CFL) select eligible Canadian/non-import players, typically from the ranks of U Sports football or NCAA college football. The first official draft took place in 1953, with Doug McNichol becoming the first player to be drafted and was therefore drafted first overall. This list does not include the 1952 IRFU college draft due to its unofficial status. While only the eastern teams participated for the first three years, all nine teams began participating in the 1956 draft. From 1960 to 1962, however, due to a dispute over talent from western universities and a reluctance of eastern draftees to move west, BC, Edmonton, Saskatchewan, and Winnipeg were awarded territorial rights to players from their city's university. Because Calgary had no university program in their territory, they continued to participate in the draft during these three years. From 1973 to 1984, teams were granted territorial rights players before the actual draft took place, hence, players listed in those years were actually drafted later. Since 2016, in non-pandemic years, the draft has consisted of eight rounds, with teams selecting in reverse order of their placement in the previous season.

== List of first overall picks ==
= CFL Division All-Star	= CFL All-Star	= Hall of Famer

=== Eastern draft ===
Year	Player	Position	School	IRFU team
1953	Doug McNichol	End	Western Ontario	Montreal Alouettes
1954	Bill McFarlane	Halfback	Toronto	Toronto Argonauts
1955	Gino Fracas	Halfback	Western Ontario	Ottawa Rough Riders

=== National draft ===
Year	Player	Position	School	CFL team
1956	Lou Bruce	End	Queen's	Ottawa Rough Riders
1957	Jim Hughes	Tackle	Queen's	BC Lions
1958	Len Sigurdson	Tackle	McGill	Saskatchewan Roughriders
1959	Lorry Stacey	Defensive end	Toronto	Toronto Argonauts
1960	Bill Mitchell	Tackle	Western Ontario	Toronto Argonauts
1961	Casey Wood	Tackle	Toronto	Toronto Argonauts
1962	Harvey Scott	Guard	Western Ontario	Calgary Stampeders
1963	John Wydareny	Defensive back	Western Ontario	Toronto Argonauts
1964	Barry Mitchelson	End	Western Ontario	Edmonton Eskimos
1965	Jim Young	Wide receiver	Queen's	Toronto Argonauts
1966	Ed Turek	Halfback	Waterloo Lutheran	Edmonton Eskimos
1967	Lawrence Barrett	Halfback	British Columbia	Toronto Argonauts
1968	Mike Eben	Wide receiver	Toronto	BC Lions
1969	Doug Strong	Halfback	Waterloo Lutheran	Winnipeg Blue Bombers
1970	Wayne Holm	Quarterback	Simon Fraser	Calgary Stampeders
1971	Brian Donnelly	Defensive back	Simon Fraser	Saskatchewan Roughriders
1972	Larry Smith	Running back	Bishop's	Montreal Alouettes
1973	Brian Sopatyk	Offensive guard	Boise State	BC Lions
1974	Randy Halsall	Offensive tackle	Wake Forest	Toronto Argonauts
1975	Steve Scully	Offensive tackle	Syracuse	Winnipeg Blue Bombers
1976	Tim Berryman	Linebacker	Ottawa	Edmonton Eskimos
1977	Mike Riley	Defensive tackle	Dalhousie	Ottawa Rough Riders
1978	Dave Kirzinger	Defensive tackle	Ottawa	Calgary Stampeders
1979	Kevin Powell	Offensive tackle	Utah State	Toronto Argonauts
1980	Greg Barrow	Offensive lineman	Florida	Toronto Argonauts
1981	Frank Cosec	Linebacker	Waterloo	Calgary Stampeders
1982	Mike Kirkley	Running back	Western Ontario	Toronto Argonauts
1983	Jerry Dobrovolny	Offensive tackle	British Columbia	Calgary Stampeders
1984	Frank Balkovec	Linebacker	Toronto	BC Lions

=== Modern era ===
Year	Player	Position	School	CFL team
1985	Nicholas Benjamin	Offensive lineman	Concordia	Ottawa Rough Riders
1986	Kent Warnock	Defensive end	Calgary	Calgary Stampeders
1987	Leo Groenewegen	Offensive lineman	British Columbia	Ottawa Rough Riders
1988	Orville Lee	Running back	Simon Fraser	Ottawa Rough Riders
1989	Gerald Wilcox	Tight end	Weber State	Ottawa Rough Riders
1990	Sean Millington	Running back	Simon Fraser	Edmonton Eskimos
1991	Nick Mazzoli	Wide receiver	Simon Fraser	Hamilton Tiger-Cats
1992	Bruce Covernton	Offensive tackle	Weber State	Calgary Stampeders
1993	Patrick Burke	Defensive back	Fresno College	BC Lions
1994	Val St. Germain	Offensive lineman	McGill	Hamilton Tiger-Cats
1995	Tom Nütten	Offensive lineman	Western Michigan	Hamilton Tiger-Cats
1996	Don Blair	Slotback	Calgary	Edmonton Eskimos
1997	Chad Folk	Offensive lineman	Utah	Toronto Argonauts
1998	Tim Fleiszer	Defensive lineman	Harvard	Hamilton Tiger-Cats
1999	Rob Meier	Defensive end	Washington State	BC Lions
2000	Tyson St. James	Linebacker	British Columbia	Saskatchewan Roughriders
2001	Scott Schultz	Defensive lineman	North Dakota	Saskatchewan Roughriders
2002	Alexandre Gauthier	Offensive lineman	Laval	Ottawa Renegades
2003	Steve Morley	Offensive lineman	Saint Mary's	Calgary Stampeders
2004	Wayne Smith	Offensive lineman	Appalachian State	Hamilton Tiger-Cats
2005	Miguel Robede	Defensive end	Laval	Calgary Stampeders
2006	Adam Braidwood	Defensive end	Washington State	Edmonton Eskimos
2007	Chris Bauman	Wide receiver	Regina	Hamilton Tiger-Cats
2008	Dylan Barker	Defensive back	Saskatchewan	Hamilton Tiger-Cats
2009	Simeon Rottier	Offensive lineman	Alberta	Hamilton Tiger-Cats
2010	Shomari Williams	Linebacker	Queen's	Saskatchewan Roughriders
2011	Henoc Muamba	Linebacker	St. Francis Xavier	Winnipeg Blue Bombers
2012	Ben Heenan	Offensive lineman	Saskatchewan	Saskatchewan Roughriders
2013	Linden Gaydosh	Defensive lineman	Calgary	Hamilton Tiger-Cats
2014	Pierre Lavertu	Offensive lineman	Laval	Calgary Stampeders
2015	Alex Mateas	Offensive lineman	UConn	Ottawa Redblacks
2016	Josiah St. John	Offensive lineman	Oklahoma	Saskatchewan Roughriders
2017	Faith Ekakitie	Defensive lineman	Iowa	Winnipeg Blue Bombers
2018	Mark Chapman	Wide receiver	Central Michigan	Hamilton Tiger-Cats
2019	Shane Richards	Offensive lineman	Oklahoma State	Toronto Argonauts
2020	Jordan Williams	Linebacker	East Carolina	BC Lions
2021	Jake Burt	Tight end	Boston College	Hamilton Tiger-Cats
2022	Tyrell Richards	Linebacker	Syracuse	Montreal Alouettes
2023	Dontae Bull	Offensive lineman	Fresno State	Ottawa Redblacks
2024	Joel Dublanko	Linebacker	Cincinnati	Edmonton Elks
2025	Damien Alford	Wide receiver	Utah	Calgary Stampeders
2026	Giordano Vaccaro	Offensive lineman	Purdue	Ottawa Redblacks

=== Foreign drafts ===
Year	Player	Position	Team drafted from (College or professional)	CFL team
2019 Mexican	Diego Viamontes	Wide receiver	Mayas CDMX	Edmonton Eskimos
2019 European	Valentin Gnahoua	Defensive lineman	Berlin Rebels	Hamilton Tiger-Cats
2021 Global	Jake Ford	Punter	Ouachita Baptist	BC Lions
2022 Global	Kingsley Jonathan	Defensive end	Syracuse	Montreal Alouettes
2023 Global	Blessman Ta’ala	Defensive lineman	Hawaii	Ottawa Redblacks
2024 Global	Eteva Mauga-Clements	Linebacker	Nebraska	Edmonton Elks
2025 Global	Fraser Masin	Punter	Mississippi	Calgary Stampeders
2026 Global	Aidan Laros	Punter	Kentucky	Ottawa Redblacks

== Statistics ==
- Since 1956, Simon Fraser University and the University of Western Ontario hold the record for most first overall picks with five apiece. Among NCAA schools, the only ones with more than one first overall pick are Washington State University and Weber State University, each with two. (Although Simon Fraser is now an NCAA member, it did not hava a top overall pick since joining that body, and has since disbanded its football team.)
- Since 1956, the Toronto Argonauts have had the most first overall picks with 11.
- The Montreal Alouettes have gone the longest without a first overall draft pick, after selecting first in 1972 and then waiting until 2022 before picking first again. The Alouettes have also had the fewest first overall selections with three.
- Only two first overall draft selections have been awarded the CFL's Most Outstanding Rookie since the award was created in 1972; Orville Lee in 1988 and Jordan Williams in 2021.
- No team has ever made the first overall draft pick for more than three straight years.
