= 1970 CFL draft =

Canadian football draft

The 1970 CFL draft took place on Wednesday, February 11, 1970. Seventy-six players were selected from among 243 eligible players from Canadian universities and colleges. Canadian-born players who played at American colleges, such as Jim Corrigall of Kent State and Zenon Andrusyshyn of UCLA, were subject to the CFL's territorial rights rules and were ineligible for the College Draft.

The respective General Managers made the selections for all teams except the Toronto Argonauts, for whom Head Coach Leo Cahill made the picks. Cahill stumbled in Round Five, attempting to select end Carl Lindros from the University of Western Ontario with the 43rd over-all selection. However, Lindros already had been claimed earlier in this Draft, by Edmonton in Round Four, 30th over-all. This was perhaps the first brush with sporting controversy for Lindros, who later would serve as the agent for his son, hockey player Eric.

First-year Ottawa GM Frank Clair added some levity in Round Eight, asking if Ron Clarke had been chosen yet. CFL Chairman Greg Fulton responded, "As a matter of fact, yes. You took him on the previous round."

== Round one ==
Pick #	CFL team	Player	Position	University
1	Calgary (1) via Winnipeg	Wayne Holm	QB	Simon Fraser
2	Hamilton (1) via Montreal	Dave Fahrner	FB	Western
3	Edmonton (1)	Evald Timusk	OT	Waterloo Lutheran
4	BC (1)	John McManus	DE	Alberta
5	Hamilton (2)	Jim Bennett	OT	Toronto
6	Calgary (2)	Barry Jamieson	OT	Waterloo Lutheran
7	Winnipeg (1) via Toronto	Bob LaRose	HB	Western
8	Saskatchewan (1)	Bob Schmidt	OT	Alberta
9	Ottawa (1)	Mike Sharp	QB	Carleton

== Round two ==
Pick #	CFL team	Player	Position	University
10	Winnipeg (2)	John Senst	FL	Simon Fraser
11	Montreal (1)	Burns McPherson	HB	St. Francis Xavier
12	Edmonton (2)	Jim Henshall	HB	Western
13	BC Lions (2)	Tony D'Aloisio	FB	Windsor
14	Winnipeg (3) via Hamilton	Rick Sugden	HB	Simon Fraser
15	Calgary (3)	Don Lumb	OT	British Columbia
16	Toronto (1)	Paul Brown	OT	Waterloo Lutheran
17	Saskatchewan (2)	Andre Rancourt	DE	Ottawa
18	Ottawa (2)	Gerry Kwapisz	OT	Windsor

== Round three ==
Pick #	CFL team	Player	Position	University
19	Winnipeg (4)	Wayne Powell	OG	Ottawa
20	Montreal (2)	Andy Smith	LB	Mount Allison
21	Edmonton (3)	Paul Hendershot	HB	Waterloo Lutheran
22	BC Lions (3)	Pete Raham	DB	Toronto
23	Hamilton (3)	Paul McKay	HB	Toronto
24	Calgary (4)	Tom Schultz	DE	Ottawa
25	Toronto (2)	John Candiotto	DE-PK	Dalhousie
26	Saskatchewan (3)	Bob McCulla	OT	Ottawa
27	Hamilton (4) via Ottawa	Jeff Hilton	FB	Western

== Round four ==
Pick #	CFL team	Player	Position	University
28	Winnipeg (5)	John Storey	HB	Saskatchewan
29	Montreal (3)	John Proter	OT	St. Mary's
30	Edmonton (4)	Carl Lindros	DE	Western
31	BC Lions (4)	Don Warrington	HB	Simon Fraser
32	Hamilton (5)	Jay Graydon	DB	McMaster
33	Calgary (5)	Dave Sterritt	OT	Waterloo
34	Toronto (3)	Vince Lyons	HB	McMaster
35	Saskatchewan (4)	Greg Hunter	HB	Alberta
36	Ottawa (3)	Dave Doherty	HB	McGill

== Round five ==
Pick #	CFL team	Player	Position	University
37	Winnipeg (6)	Lorne Prokopy	HB	Calgary
38	Montreal (4)	Jim Foley	HB	PEI
39	Edmonton (5)	Don McIntyre	E	Queen's
40	BC Lions (5)	Paul Gray	QB	Waterloo Lutheran
41	Hamilton (6)	Dave Clarke	HB	Guelph
42	Calgary (6)	Alan Kinley	OT	Manitoba
–	Toronto	ineligible claim	–	–
43	Saskatchewan (5)	Ed Scorgie	DE	Waterloo
44	Ottawa (4)	Ken Whelan	HB	Guelph

== Round six ==
Pick #	CFL team	Player	Position	University
45	Winnipeg (7)	Larry Stockton	LB	Manitoba
46	Montreal (5)	Fred MacLean	C	New Brunswick
47	Edmonton (6)	Fred Promoli	E	Guelph
48	BC Lions (6)	Bob Moffatt	C	Simon Fraser
49	Hamilton (7)	Robert DiFruscia	FL	Guelph
50	Calgary (7)	Dick Stein	OT	British Columbia
51	Toronto (4)	Bear Brown	OT	Royal Military College
52	Saskatchewan (6)	George Kunyckyj	QB	Brandon
–	Ottawa	pass	–	–

== Round seven ==
Pick #	CFL team	Player	Position	University
53	Winnipeg (8)	Terry Moss	HB	Manitoba
54	Montreal (6)	Terry Arnason	FL	St. Francis Xavier
55	Edmonton (7)	Chris Hawkes	QB	Simon Fraser
56	BC Lions (7)	Brian Currie	OG	Royal Military College
57	Hamilton (8)	Peter Quinlan	QB	McMaster
58	Calgary (8)	Craig McLeod	OG	Calgary
59	Toronto (5)	Bill Simmons	HB	Royal Military College
60	Saskatchewan (7)	Jim Turnbull	HB	Queen's
61	Ottawa (5)	Ron Clarke	HB	Queen's

== Round eight ==
Pick #	CFL team	Player	Position	University
62	Winnipeg (9)	Len Sitter	C	Brandon
63	Montreal (7)	Ted Abercrombie	LB	St. Mary's
64	Edmonton (8)	Bob McGregor	FB	Waterloo Lutheran
65	BC Lions (8)	Bob Taylor	OT	McGill
66	Hamilton (9)	Doug Hinan	FB	Laurentian
67	Calgary (9)	Brent Batling	HB	Saskatchewan
–	Toronto	pass	–	–
68	Saskatchewan (8)	Peter Werry	–	Western Ontario
69	Ottawa (6)	Bob Climie	OG	Queen's

== Round nine ==
Pick #	CFL team	Player	Position	University
–	Winnipeg	pass	–	–
70	Montreal (8)	Don Lavers	OT	New Brunswick
–	Edmonton	pass	–	–
71	BC Lions (9)	Gary Conley	–	Simon Fraser
72	Hamilton (10)	Terry Harvey	FL	Waterloo Lutheran
–	Calgary	pass	–	–
–	Toronto	pass	–	–
73	Saskatchewan (9)	Roger Passmore	HB	Waterloo Lutheran
–	Ottawa	pass	–	–

== Round ten ==
Pick #	CFL team	Player	Position	University
–	Winnipeg	pass	–	–
74	Montreal (9)	Mike Brierley	DE	McMaster
–	Edmonton	pass	–	–
75	BC Lions (10)	Barrie Reid	HB	Saskatchewan
–	Hamilton	pass	–	–
–	Calgary	pass	–	–
–	Toronto	pass	–	–
76	Saskatchewan (10)	Eric Thomson	OG	Dalhousie
–	Ottawa	pass	–	–
