= 1988 Winter Olympics marketing =

1988 Winter Olympics marketing was a long running campaign that began when Calgary won its bid to host the games in 1981.

== Symbols ==
=== Emblem ===
The organizing committee Olympiques Calgary Olympics '88 (OCO'88) chose a stylized snowflake used for the 1981 bid by the Calgary Olympic Development Association (CODA) as the symbol for the 1988 Games. The snowflake is made up of interlocking "c"'s, small "c"'s representing Calgary, and the large "c"'s representing Canada. The five interlocking "c"'s represented the theme of the 1988 Games "Come Together in Calgary".

=== Motto ===
The official motto of the 1988 Winter Olympics was Coming Together in Calgary (French: Se réunir à Calgary).

=== Mascots ===
OCO'88 introduced the mascots of the Calgary Games Hidy and Howdy, at the closing ceremony of the 1984 Winter Olympics in Sarajevo. The mascots named "Hidy" and "Howdy", chosen through a public contest, were a smiling cowboy-themed polar bears designed to evoke images of "western hospitality". The mascots were played by a team of 150 students from Bishop Carroll High School, the sister-brother pair made up to 300 appearances per month in the lead up to the Games. From their introduction at the closing ceremonies of the Sarajevo Games in 1984 until their retirement at the conclusion of the Calgary Games, the pair made about 50,000 appearances.

== Corporate sponsorship and advertising ==
At the conclusion of the 1988 Winter Games, OCO'88 noted that corporate partnerships generated CA$88 million in revenue, which was 16 per cent of the CA$558.8 million OCO'88 generated in revenue. For the 1988 Winter Games there were 21 sponsors, 30 suppliers, 40 licensees, 27 contributors and one donor. Official sponsors were categorized into tiers based on contribution total, with CA$2 million separating each tier, official sponsors resulted in CA$57 million in support for the Games. Official suppliers were required to provide at least CA$500,000 in contributions, official suppliers resulted in CA$21 million in support for the Games. Licensing programs were seen as successful in Canada, but unsuccessful in international markets due to challenges negotiation with individual National Olympic Committees.

=== Sponsors ===
- Anheuser-Busch
- ATCO Development
- Canada Safeway
- Coca-Cola Company
- FedEx
- General Motors of Canada
- IBM Canada
- Kodak Canada
- Labatt Brewing Company
- Matsushita Electric Trading
- Motorola
- Nova
- Petro-Canada
- Philips Electronics
- Royal Bank of Canada
- Shell Canada
- 3M
- Time Inc./Sports Illustrated
- Visa International
- Xerox Canada

=== Team Petroleum '88 ===
Team Petroleum '88 was a program developed by OCO'88 as a program to engage oil and gas corporations in the Calgary region with the Olympic Games. Participating corporations were not provided any marketing rights, but were instead given access to tickets in a special lounge at the Olympic Saddledome for high-profile events, and priority access to tickets in other events. The Team Petroleum '88 program generated CA$4.8 million in revenue from 44 corporations.

== Official songs and anthems ==
The official song of the 1988 Winter Olympics was Can't You Feel It, composed by Canadian David Foster for the Games.
