= Paul McKay =

Paul McKay may refer to:

- Paul McKay (footballer, born 1971), English footballer
- Paul McKay (footballer, born 1996), Scottish footballer for Queen of the South
- Paul McKay (Canadian football) (born c. 1947), Canadian football player
- Paul McKay, Australian singer; see Linda George
- Captain Paul McKay (died 2014), Australian soldier, one of the very few who committed suicide by hypothermia
