= Olympic Oval =

Speed skating rink in Calgary, Canada

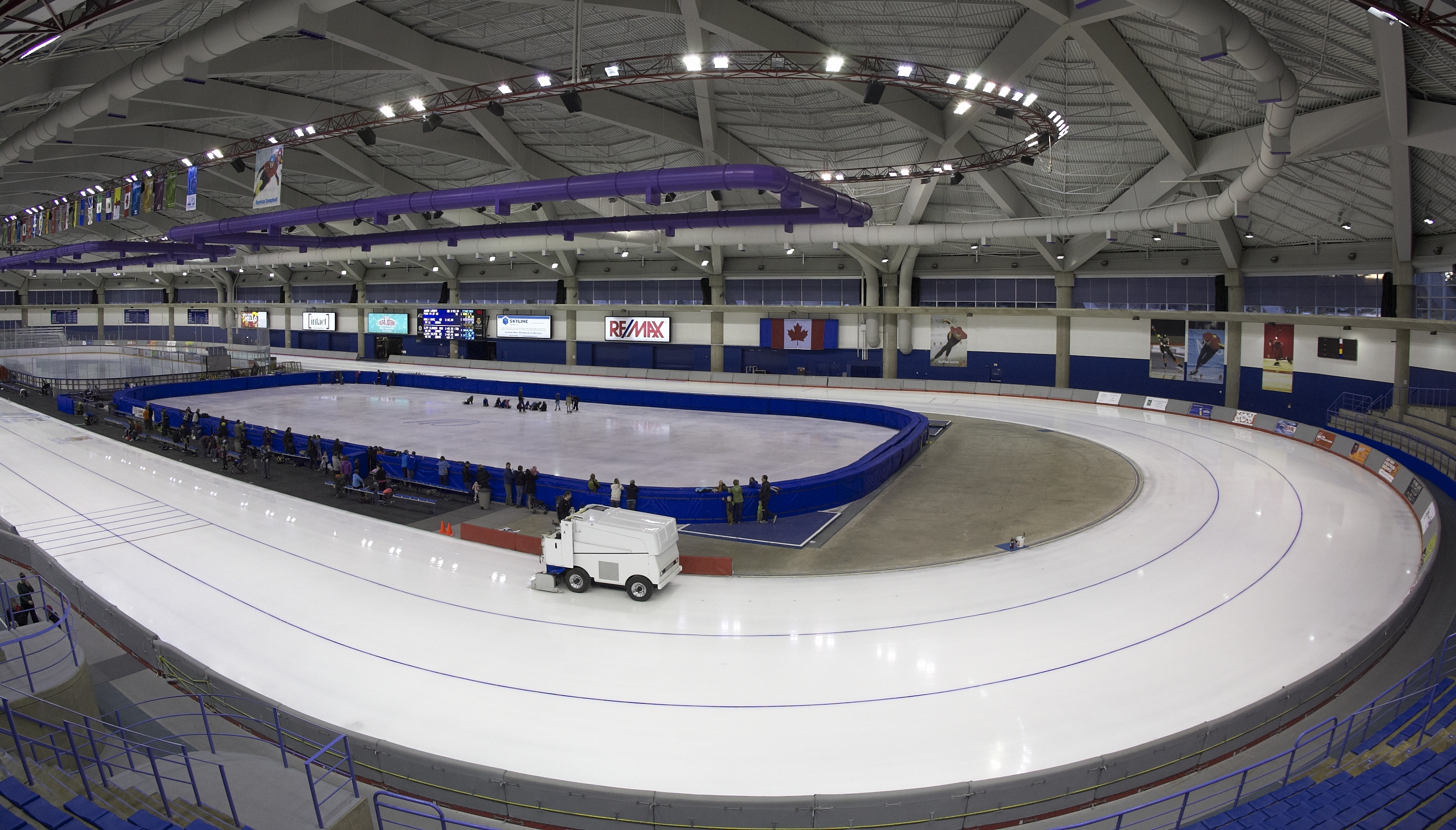
- Interior view of the oval in 2012
- Interactive map of Olympic Oval
- Full name: Olympic Oval at the University of Calgary
- Address: 288 Collegiate Boulevard NW; Calgary; Canada
- Coordinates: 51.077°N 114.136°W
- Owner: University of Calgary
- Operator: University of Calgary, Faculty of Kinesiology
- Capacity: 2,000 – permanent seating 4,000 w/ temporary seating
- Type: Arena
- Current use: Ice skating Ice hockey Running
- Public transit: University

Construction
- Groundbreaking: 1985
- Opened: September 27, 1987; 39 years ago
- Cost: CAD$38.9 Million
- Architect: Graham McCourt Architects
- Builder: W. A. Stephenson Construction (Western) Ltd.

Tenants
- Calgary Dinos; Speed Skating Canada; Oval Elite Athlete Pathway

Website
- oval.ucalgary.ca

The Olympic Oval in Calgary, Alberta, Canada, is North America's first covered speed skating oval; it was built for the 1988 Winter Olympics and opened 39 years ago on September 27, 1987.

Located on the University of Calgary campus, it is the official designated training centre for Speed Skating Canada and the Elite Athlete Pathway. This oval includes an ice hockey rink, a short track speed ice skating rink, a 400m long track rink, and a 450 m running track.

== History ==
The precursor for construction of a speed skating oval came with Calgary's successful bid for the 1988 Winter Olympics in September 1980. Calgary's bid originally envisioned a temporary outdoor speed skating oval constructed on the Calgary Stampede grounds for a mere CA$3.4 million. After Calgary was awarded the Games, the University of Calgary commissioned a study to evaluate whether a covered speed skating facility would fit into the university's expansion plan, the study was completed in June 1982 and found value in the proposal. The University of Calgary agreed to host the facility on the condition that the university would own the facility, no aspect of the construction would be paid for by the university, the design and construction was delegated to the university, and the facility would be designed to maximize public use.

In December 1983, the organizing committee, Olympiques Calgary Olympics '88 (OCO'88) was able to secure CA$200 million in funding from the Government of Canada for the games which included CA$35 million (indexed to inflation) for a covered speed skating facility, along with an additional CA$68 million in project funding on the university campus. The University of Calgary competitive bid awarded Graham McCourt Architects the contract as prime consultant for the design of the Oval, with a contract that provided a fixed budget, with no cost overruns, and a completion date of April 1987.

The Olympic Oval was designed as the first covered speed skating oval in North America, and was the first at a Winter Olympics. This provided the unique challenge of designing a unique facility that had never been used in competition before. A competitive bid amongst 6 pre-qualified general contractors was run for the construction contract, and when tenders closed in February 1985 W. A. Stephenson Construction (Western) Ltd. was selected as the general contractor with a bid of CA$27.3 million. Construction was controversial as labour unions expected the facility to be deemed a federally funded project under the Fair Wages Act, requiring wages for workers to be paid in accordance with the Act, while the university argued that the Oval was a university project and not subject to the Act.

Like the Olympic Saddledome, most of the Oval's structure was built using precast, prestressed concrete. Twenty eight beams were laid along the outside of the perimeter of the building to support 84 additional beams used to construct a lattice frame for the arched roof. The interior scaffolding used to hoist these 84 beams had to be lowered a centimetre at a time in a predetermined sequence in order to distribute the load of the roof equally to each of the 28 exterior support beams.

Substantial completion of construction occurred in April 1987, officially opening on September 27, 1987, five months before the Olympics. The official opening included demonstrations of figure skating, short track speed skating, and a ribbon cutting ceremony by the Canadian National Speed Skating Teams. The Olympic Oval's opening was witnessed by over 3,000 people, with Otto Jelinek, the Minister for Fitness and Amateur Sport hosting the ceremony, along with University President Norman Wagner, Minister of External Affairs Joe Clark, IOC President Juan Antonio Samaranch, and other speakers.

It was during the speed skating events of the Olympic Winter Games in 1988 that The Oval became known as "The Fastest Ice in the World" as world records were set in seven events (Men's 500 m, 1500 m, 10,000 m, and Women's 500 m, 1000 m, 3000 m, 5000 m), and Olympic records were set in the other three events (Men's 1500 m, 5000 m, and Women's 1500 m). The combination of the climate-controlled facility and the effects of high altitude have been credited for the fast ice surface.

In 1991, the Oval hosted Speed Skating for the 1991 Winter Deaflympics held in Banff.

Throughout the last 32 years, over 300 world records have been set at the Oval. By 2019, the Olympic Oval has produced (as a world class training facility) 32 Canadian Olympic medalists, including Ted-Jan Bloemen, who won a silver in the men's 5000m and a gold in the men's 10,000m at the Pyeongchang Winter Olympic Games in 2018.

== Training facility ==
Along with the 400m long-track ice, the Olympic Oval also includes two international-sized ice rinks for short track speed skating and ice hockey, a 450m running track surrounding the main oval, and an eight-lane 110m sprint track for year-round athletics training. At present, hundreds of Canadian athletes are training at the Oval year round.

Saskatoon-native Catriona Le May Doan, who won the gold medal in speed skating at the 1998 Winter Olympics and in the 2002 Winter Olympics, began training at the Oval soon after its construction. The Oval continues to be regarded as a premier speed skating venue, and a preferred training facility for speed skating teams across the globe.

== Other activities ==
When not hosting hockey games and speed skating competitions, the Olympic Oval is Calgary's premier public skating facility. During the ice-out months of April and May, the Oval hosts the Judo and Taekwondo Canadian National Championships, and major volleyball, gymnastics, floor hockey, running, and billiards events. In addition, the Oval hosts major car shows, science fairs, expos, robotics shows, science and engineering events, major film and television shoots, fundraisers, the RBC training ground and University of Calgary events.
