= Doug MacKenzie =

Doug MacKenzie may refer to:

- Doug MacKenzie (Family Affairs), a character on the soap opera Family Affairs
- Doug MacKenzie (Canadian football) (born c. 1938), Canadian football player

== See also ==
- Doug McKenzie (disambiguation)
