= John Reykdal =

Canadian football player (born 1943)

Profile
- Position: Center

Personal information
- Born: December 12, 1943 (age 82); Canada
- Listed height: 6 ft 1 in (1.85 m)
- Listed weight: 230 lb (104 kg)

Career information
- University: UBC
- CFL draft: 1965: 4th round, 36th overall pick

Career history
- 1967–1967: Toronto Argonauts
- 1968–1969: Edmonton Eskimos
- 1970: Calgary Stampeders

John Reykdal (born December 12, 1943) is a Canadian former professional football player who played for the Toronto Argonauts, Edmonton Eskimos, and Calgary Stampeders.
