= Olympiques Calgary Olympics '88 =

- Nickname: OCO'88
- Formation: January 1982; 44 years ago
- Type: Company limited by guarantee
- Headquarters: Calgary
- Chairman: Frank King
- President: David Leighton (1982–1983); William Pratt (1983–1988)
- Formerly called: Calgary Olympic Development Association

The Olympiques Calgary Olympics '88 (OCO'88), originally incorporated as XV Olympic Winter Games Organizing Committee was the organization responsible for overseeing the planning and development of the 1988 Winter Olympic Games.

== Formation ==
=== Calgary Olympic Development Association and the 1988 Winter Olympic Bid ===
The Calgary Olympic Development Association (CODA) was formed as an organizational group to support Calgary's bids for the 1964, 1968, and 1972 Winter Games. CODA was laid dormant in 1966, after losing three consecutive bids in a row. However, CODA was later revived in 1978, when Frank King and Bob Niven of Calgary's Booster Club took over the organization's leadership. King and Niven brought some members from previous bids back including former Olympic Sprinter and CODA founder Ernie McCullough, and politician Arthur Ryan Smith to consult on the project.

In October 1979, CODA was able to secure the Canadian Olympic Association (COA) support as Canada's official bid for the 1988 Winter Olympics over a competing bid by Vancouver by a vote of 27–9. Calgary's bid was bold, as CODA proposed constructing all new venues to overcome the city's lack of winter sport facilities with the argument that Canada's inventory of training facilities would grow significantly if Calgary was awarded the Games. The defeated Vancouver organizing group lamented that they lost to Calgary's "Big-ticket Games" idea, which was estimated to cost nearly three times what the Vancouver group was expected to pay to host the Winter Olympics. Vancouver's bid was based on already developed infrastructure, including the Pacific Coliseum and Whistler Blackcomb. Next, CODA spent two years building local support for the megaproject, selling CA$5 memberships to approximately 80,000 of Calgary's 600,000 residents. Calgary had further secured CA$270 million in funding from the federal (CA$200 million) and Alberta's governments while some civic leaders, including then mayor Ralph Klein, crisscrossed the world to favor IOC delegates. Driven by the arrival of the National Hockey League's (NHL) newly renamed Calgary Flames from Atlanta in 1980, the city had already begun constructing a new NHL arena that would be later named the Olympic Saddledome. That course of action demonstrated to the IOC about Calgary's determination in wanting to host the Winter Olympics.

Calgary was one of three cities and towns that bid officially for the 1988 Winter Olympics. The other two were Falun, Sweden, and Cortina d'Ampezzo, Italy. The Italian town (comune) had before hosted the 1956 Winter Olympics. The vote was held on September 30, 1981, in Baden-Baden, West Germany, during the 84th IOC Session and 11th Olympic Congress. After Cortina d'Ampezzo was eliminated in the first round of balloting, Calgary won in the second and final round of balloting over Falun, by a margin of 17 votes.

The Calgary Olympic Development Association (CODA) Board of Directors had originally 25 members chaired by Frank King. Other members of the board of directors included Dick Pound, Mayor of Calgary Ralph Klein, former Mayor Ross Alger, James Worrall, Blake Ashforth, Brig. General James Cotter, Ed Davis, Scobey Hartley, Bob Hindmarch, Roger Jackson, Joe Kryczka, David Leighton, Gerald Maier, Douglas Mitchell, Ken Moore, Robert Niven, William Nield, Ed O'Connor, Arthur Ryan Smith, Peter Valentine, William J. Warren, Jack Wilson, Harold Wright, and Ed Zemrau. The executive committee was composed of 13 members of the board of directors, whose president was Robert Niven.

=== Forming the Olympiques Calgary Olympics '88 ===
Following Calgary's selection as the host city for the 1988 Winter Olympic Games an official organizing committee was formed in January 1982, and incorporated in April 1982 under the name XV Olympic Winter Games Organizing Committee. Later the organization was officially incorporated as Olympiques Calgary Olympics '88 recognizing Canada's bilingual recognition of French and English as the nation's official languages. The name Calgary Olympic Organizing Committee had the acronym of COOC which the committee wanted to avoid. The organization used the acronym OCO'88. OCO'88's symbol continued the stylized snowflake composed of four small "c"'s representing Calgary surrounding one large "C" representing Canada. The symbol was originally designed and used by CODA to support the Olympic bid.

OCO'88 was formed by utilizing many of the original board of directors members from CODA, originally starting with 11 members who each were given a specific area of responsibility. The board of directors continued to grow, first when Mayor Ralph Klein felt representation from the City of Calgary was insufficient and requested a second member. The board grew to 25 members by October 1983. The organization further expanded to 29 members by 1985, when former Alberta premier, Peter Lougheed, was added to the list.

In March 1982, the first president of OCO'88 was identified after a long search which included 129 candidates. David Leighton, an author, businessman and president of The Banff Centre was chosen for the role, and began part time in May 1982 and transitioned to full-time in September 1982. On December 30, 1982 the board of directors voted unanimously to terminate Leighton's contract, and an agreement was made for Leighton remained in the role of president until his resignation on January 18, 1983, five months after becoming full-time. The board and Leighton agreed to state the reason for his resignation was a "difference in management philosophy", while board chairman Frank King noted there were concerns with budget development, site locations, and dissatisfaction with the other members of the board. In May 1983, Bill Pratt was selected as the new president and Chief Operating Officer from approximately 200 candidates. Pratt was viewed as a "hands on" manager who worked as the project manager for the Calgary Saddledome construction, General Manager of the Calgary Stampede, and was involved in the construction of numerous buildings around Calgary. Pratt's hand's on management style was not universally appreciated, and Mayor Ralph Klein and long-time city Alderman Donald Adam Hartman argued against OCO'88 hiring Pratt.

The City of Calgary and the Canadian Olympic Association (COA) delegated officially all Olympic responsibilities, including staging the Winter Olympics under the Olympic Charter, to the renamed OCO'88 in February and September 1983 respectively.

=== Organizational challenges ===
Olympic biographer, Kevin Wamsley, noted that the CEO Frank King, the President Bill Pratt, Ralph Klein, and a former COA President Roger Jackson had collectively the most influence on all aspects of these Winter Olympics. This organizing committee took a hierarchical form for planning these Olympics, which caused consternation from some staff, volunteers, and people in executive roles. The original staff, who were at odds with the current management structure, were either fired or have willingly resigned. Also, there were claims that some of the volunteers were verbally abused. As a result, David Leighton resigned as OOC President in 1982, after only five months on the job. Therefore, Bill Pratt, a former general manager of the Calgary Stampede, became the new OOC President shortly afterwards.

However, conflicts within OCO'88 grew in the public eye and a review of the entire management structure was conducted, after Ralph Klein threatened it with a public inquiry in 1986. Frank King remained as CEO, but with the addition of more full time staff. Also, a number of volunteer committees were created to organize some 9,000 volunteers for the Winter Olympics. Despite these changes, there was still some animosity within OCO'88. Kevin Walmsley noted that Bill Pratt and Frank King continued to have a tense relationship with each other. Some members of the news media commented that the changes made further alienated the general public, with a CTV producer, Ralph Mellanby, describing it as "an oilman’s and cattleman’s Calgary thing." Long-time Canadian IOC member Dick Pound, acting in his official capacity went on the record with Maclean's noting the IOC grew increasingly frustrated with OCO'88, in which that it saw the actions of OCO'88 as a refusal to collaborate with them.

== Members ==
Olympiques Calgary Olympics '88 Board of Directors during the 1988 Winter Olympics
Name	Board Status	Organization	Other Responsibilities
Peter Lougheed	Honorary Chairman, Exec. Committee		
Frank King	Chairman, Exec. Committee		
Robert D. Niven	Vice Chairman, Exec Committee		
Maurice Allan	Exec Committee	Canadian Olympic Association	
Gerald Berger	Exec Committee	Government of Canada	
Robert J. Holmes	Exec Committee	City of Calgary	
Roger Jackson	Exec Committee	Canadian Olympic Association	
Ralph Klein	Exec Committee	Mayor of Calgary	
John M.S. Lecky	Exec Committee		
Richard Pound	Exec Committee	International Olympic Committee	
George de Rappard	Exec Committee	Government of Alberta	
William J. Warren	Exec Committee		
James Worrall	Exec Committee	International Olympic Committee	
Paula Andrews		Mayor of Canmore	
Robert G. Brawn			
Wendy Bryden			
George Cornish		Chief Commissioner, City of Calgary	
J. Ian Douglas			
Jane Edwards			
Diane Hunter		Alderman, Calgary	
Robert A. Kasting			
Robert Laidlaw			
Lyle Makosky		Government of Canada	
Barry Mitchelson		Government of Alberta	
Lee Richardson		Government of Canada	
Terry Roberts		Government of Alberta	
Walter Sieber			
Donald H. Sprague			
Norman Wagner			
