= Joanne Cuthbertson =

Canadian academic administrator

Joanne Cuthbertson CM

Chancellor of the University of Calgary
- In office 2006–2010
- Preceded by: William J. Warren
- Succeeded by: Jim Dinning

Personal details
- Spouse: Charlie Fischer
- Occupation: Public Advocate and Educator

Joanne Cuthbertson CM was the chancellor of the University of Calgary in Alberta from 2006 until 2010.
