= Dave Cranmer =

Canadian gridiron football player (born 1944)

Profile
- Position: Defensive back

Personal information
- Born: September 18, 1944 (age 82); Sarnia, Ontario, Canada

Career information
- College: Bowling Green State

Career history
- 1968–1970: Calgary Stampeders
- 1971–1972: Toronto Argonauts
- 1973: Hamilton Tiger-Cats
- 1973: BC Lions

Awards and highlights
- Dr. Beattie Martin Trophy (1968)

Dave Cranmer (born September 18, 1944) is a former award-winning halfback who played in the Canadian Football League (CFL) from 1968 to 1973.

A graduate of the Bowling Green State University, Cranmer signed with the Calgary Stampeders in 1968, where he won the Dr. Beattie Martin Trophy for best Canadian rookie in the west (with 572 rushing yards and 34 pass receptions for 492 yards). In 1969, he rushed for 228 yards (and punted) and in 1970 he rushed for 328 yards and caught 32 passes for 518 more yards, and he played in two Grey Cup defeats (1968 and 1970). In 1971, he joined the Toronto Argonauts, catching 27 passes for 506 yards and again losing the Grey Cup game, ironically to his former team. Injuries limited his 1972 season, catching 17 passes for 301 yards. He finished his career playing with the Hamilton Tiger-Cats and BC Lions in 1973, catching 11 passes for 141 yards and rushing for 80 more.

After football, he settled in Brampton becoming a teacher (Bramalea Secondary School). He is more affectionately referred to by his students as "Coach" or "Coach C". He is a father of two; his son Paul Cranmer also played in the CFL, for two seasons (1993 and 1994) with the Saskatchewan Roughriders and the Argonauts.
