= Robbie Campbell =

Canadian football player

Profile
- Position: Defensive back

Personal information
- Born: 1942 or 1943 (age 83–84); Toronto, Ontario, Canada
- Listed height: 5 ft 11 in (1.80 m)
- Listed weight: 180 lb (82 kg)

Career information
- University: Western
- CFL draft: 1967: 1st round, 5th overall pick

Career history
- 1967–1968: Edmonton Eskimos
- 1970: BC Lions

Robert Campbell (born 1942 or 1943) is a Canadian football player who played for the Edmonton Eskimos and BC Lions. He previously played football at the University of Western Ontario. During his time in Edmonton, Campbell was a medical doctor and worked at the University of Alberta hospital.
