= Dean Noel =

American gridiron football player (born 1969)

Profile
- Position: Fullback

Personal information
- Born: February 21, 1969 (age 57); Ottawa, Ontario, Canada
- Listed height: 5 ft 10 in (1.78 m)
- Listed weight: 216 lb (98 kg)

Career information
- College: Delaware State
- CFL draft: 1993: 4th round, 26th overall pick

Career history
- 1993–1994: Ottawa Rough Riders
- 1995–1997: Hamilton Tiger-Cats

Dean Noel (born February 21, 1969) is a Canadian former professional football fullback who played for five years in the Canadian Football League (CFL) for the Ottawa Rough Riders and Hamilton Tiger-Cats.

== College career ==
Noel played college football for the Delaware State Hornets.

== Professional career ==
=== Ottawa Rough Riders ===
After finishing his college eligibility, Noel was drafted in the fourth round, 26th overall, by his hometown Ottawa Rough Riders, in the 1993 CFL draft. He played in 25 regular season games for the Rough Riders over two seasons where he had four carries for 10 yards and 13 receptions for 133 yards and two touchdowns. He also recorded 42 special teams tackles, including 30 in 1994, which is an Ottawa franchise record.

=== Hamilton Tiger-Cats ===
Noel joined the Hamilton Tiger-Cats in 1995 and played for the team for three years in 40 regular season games. He had 18 carries for 111 yards, 14 catches for 121 yards, and 57 special teams tackles.

== Personal life ==
Noel and his family moved from the Caribbean to Ottawa when he was four years old. His son, Serron is a professional ice hockey player who was drafted by the Florida Panthers.
