= Daniel Joseph (Canadian football) =

Canadian gridiron football player (born 1997)

No. 99 – Calgary Stampeders
- Position: Defensive lineman
- Roster status: 6-game injured list
- CFL status: National

Personal information
- Born: March 12, 1997 (age 29); Toronto, Ontario, Canada
- Listed height: 6 ft 3 in (1.91 m)
- Listed weight: 247 lb (112 kg)

Career information
- High school: Lake Forest Academy
- College: North Carolina State (2020–2021); Penn State (2017–2019)
- CFL draft: 2021: 1st round, 4th overall pick

Career history
- 2022: Buffalo Bills*
- 2023: Seattle Sea Dragons
- 2024: Birmingham Stallions*
- 2024: BC Lions*
- 2024: Toronto Argonauts
- 2024: Edmonton Elks
- 2025–present: Calgary Stampeders
- * Offseason or practice squad member only
- Stats at CFL.ca

Daniel Joseph (born March 12, 1997) is a Canadian professional football defensive lineman for the Calgary Stampeders of the Canadian Football League (CFL).

== College career ==
Joseph first played college football for the Penn State Nittany Lions from 2017 to 2019. He played in 32 games for the Nittany Lions where he had 12 solo tackles, 17 assisted tackles, five sacks, one forced fumble, and one fumble recovery. He transferred to North Carolina State University to play for the NC State Wolfpack where he played in 23 games, recording 33 solo tackles, 50 assisted tackles, 11.5 sacks, and two forced fumbles.

== Professional career ==
Pre-draft measurables
Height	Weight	Arm length	Hand span	Wingspan	40-yard dash	10-yard split	20-yard split	20-yard shuttle	Three-cone drill	Vertical jump	Broad jump
6 ft 2 1/4 in (1.89 m)	261 lb (118 kg)	36 in (0.91 m)	9 1/4 in (0.23 m)	6 ft 10 in (2.08 m)	5.08 s	1.80 s	2.96 s	4.45 s	7.45 s	29.0 in (0.74 m)	9 ft 0 in (2.74 m)
All values from Pro Day

Joseph was drafted in the first round, fourth overall, by the BC Lions in the 2021 CFL draft, but returned for his final year of college eligibility.

=== Buffalo Bills ===
Joseph signed with the Buffalo Bills after signing on May 19, 2022, as an undrafted free agent. He played in three preseason games, but was released on August 29, 2022.

=== Seattle Sea Dragons ===
Joseph played for the Seattle Sea Dragons in 2023 where he played in seven games, recording eight tackles and two sacks.

=== Birmingham Stallions ===
On August 24, 2023, Joseph signed with the Birmingham Stallions ahead of their 2024 season. However, he did not play in a game for the Stallions.

=== BC Lions ===
On January 17, 2024, it was announced that Joseph had signed with the BC Lions, who still held his rights after drafting him nearly three years earlier. He attended training camp with the team in 2024, but was released after the first preseason game on May 28, 2024.

=== Toronto Argonauts ===
Joseph signed with his hometown Toronto Argonauts on July 8, 2024. He quickly made his CFL debut on July 11, 2024, against the Montreal Alouettes, where he recorded one special teams tackle. He played in one more game before being moved to the practice roster and was then outright released on July 30, 2024.

=== Edmonton Elks ===
It was announced on August 19, 2024, that Joseph had signed a practice roster agreement with the Edmonton Elks. After playing in the Labour Day Classic, he played in all seven remaining regular season games in 2024, recording five defensive tackles and one sack. He was released prior to training camp for the following season on May 2, 2025.

=== Calgary Stampeders ===
On September 9, 2025, Joseph signed with the Calgary Stampeders. In 2025, he played in six regular season games, recording three defensive tackles and three special teams tackles.

== Personal life ==
Joseph was born to parents Grace Ekakitie and Charles Joseph. He has three siblings, Love Joseph, Faith Ekakitie, and Anniemarie Joseph. Faith also played in the CFL as a defensive lineman as a first-round draft pick. His cousin, Ese Mrabure-Ajufo, was similarly drafted in the first round, by the BC Lions, and played in the CFL for seven years.
