= Don Warrington (Canadian football) =

Canadian football player

No. 21
- Position: Running back

Personal information
- Born: June 7, 1948; Burnaby, British Columbia, Canada
- Died: December 4, 1980 (aged 32); Edmonton, Alberta, Canada
- Listed height: 6 ft 0 in (1.83 m)
- Listed weight: 205 lb (93 kg)

Career information
- College: Simon Fraser
- CFL draft: 1970: 4th round, 31st overall pick

Career history
- 1970: BC Lions*
- 1971–1980: Edmonton Eskimos
- * Offseason or practice squad member only

Awards and highlights
- 4× Grey Cup champion (1975, 1978−1980)

Don Warrington (June 7, 1948 – December 4, 1980) was a running back who played ten seasons in the Canadian Football League (CFL) for the Edmonton Eskimos. In his career, Warrington was a part of four Grey Cup championship teams. He was nicknamed "Jeep". He played college football for the Simon Fraser Clan.

He suffered fatal injuries in a car accident near Sherwood Park, Alberta, on December 2, 1980, nine days after appearing in the Edmonton Eskimos' third (of five) consecutive Grey Cup wins that year. Warrington died two days later at University of Alberta Hospital in Edmonton. In his memory, the Eskimos wore a patch with 'EE 21' in a circle on their jersey sleeves the following season; the team won its fourth straight Grey Cup that year.

Warrington's jersey number (21) was unofficially retired by the Eskimos following his death.

== See also ==
- List of gridiron football players who died during their careers

== Sources ==
- Soutar, Ted. "Don Warrington". CFL Legends. CFL.ca. Archived from the original on 2012-05-24.
