= Paul Cranmer =

Canadian gridiron football player (born 1969)

No. 16, 80
- Position: Slotback

Personal information
- Born: November 27, 1969 (age 56); Calgary, Alberta, Canada
- Listed height: 6 ft 1 in (1.85 m)
- Listed weight: 195 lb (88 kg)

Career information
- High school: Lorne Park (Mississauga, Ontario)
- College: West Virginia (1989–1990); Grand Valley State (1991–1992)
- CFL draft: 1993: 4th round, 25th overall pick

Career history
- 1993: Saskatchewan Roughriders
- 1994: Toronto Argonauts

Paul Cranmer (born November 27, 1969) is a Canadian former professional football slotback who played two seasons in the Canadian Football League (CFL) with the Saskatchewan Roughriders and Toronto Argonauts. He was selected by the Roughriders in the fourth found of the 1993 CFL draft after playing college football at Grand Valley State University.

== Early life and college ==
Paul Cranmer was born on November 27, 1969, in Calgary, Alberta. He played high school football at Lorne Park Secondary School in Mississauga, Ontario as a running back.

Cranmer joined the West Virginia Mountaineers of West Virginia University as a walk-on wide receiver in 1989. He recorded one solo tackle in 1990. He then transferred to play for the Grand Valley State Lakers of Grand Valley State University from 1991 to 1992, seeing limited playing time at wide receiver and on special teams.

== Professional career ==
Cranmer was selected by the Saskatchewan Roughriders in the fourth round, with the 25th overall pick, of the 1993 CFL draft. He played in one game for the Roughriders during the 1993 season, recording one special teams tackle. He wore jersey number 16 while with the Roughriders.

Cranmer played in two games for the Toronto Argonauts of the CFL in 1994. He wore number 80 with the Argonauts.

== Personal life ==
Cranmer is the son of CFL player Dave Cranmer.
