= Doug McKenzie =

Doug McKenzie may refer to:

== Comedians ==
- Part of the Canadian comedy duo Bob and Doug McKenzie
- Part of the Australian comedy duo Zig and Zag (Australian performers)

== Others ==
- Doug McKenzie (magician) (born 1980), magician and TV producer
- Douglas McKenzie (1906–1979), Australian cricketer

== See also ==
- Doug MacKenzie (disambiguation)
