= Charlie Fischer =

Canadian businessman (1950–2020)

Charlie Fischer OC AOE
- Born: 21 March 1950; Saskatoon, Saskatchewan
- Died: 17 June 2020 (aged 70); Calgary, Alberta
- Education: University of Calgary
- Occupations: Former president and CEO of Nexen
- Spouse: Joanne Cuthbertson

Charles Wayne Fischer OC AOE (21 March 1950 – 17 June 2020) was the president and chief executive officer of Calgary-based Nexen Inc until December 2008. He previously headed a U.S.-Canada working group on clean energy within the Clean Energy Dialogue, formed during a summit between the Canadian Prime Minister Stephen Harper and U.S. President Barack Obama.

== Career ==
Fischer has an extensive career in the Canadian extractive industry. In the 1980s he worked for TransCanada Pipelines and Encor Energy Corporation Inc.. In 1994, he began work for Nexen as senior vice president, exploration and production, North America. He was appointed to the Nexen Board in 2000 and became president and CEO on June 1, 2001.

He previously co-chaired the Alberta Climate Change Central board.

In April 2009, the Canadian government named him as a head of one of three climate change working groups as part of the Clean Energy Dialogue with the United States. Several organizations have criticized this appointment, including the Sierra Club of Canada.

In December 2008, Fischer held over 500,000 common shares in Nexen, then valued at approximately C$9.5 million, and options on three million more shares.

Fischer remained a registered lobbyist in Canada, in January 2009, in his capacity as the responsible officer for Nexen.

Fischer is also a member of the Strategic Advisory Board of the Libin Cardiovascular Institute of Alberta.

In 2019, he was appointed to Order of Canada and, in July 2020, appointed posthumously to the Alberta Order of Excellence.

== Education ==
Fischer received a B.Sc. in chemical engineering (1971) and an MBA in finance (1982) from the University of Calgary. He also earned an honorary Doctor of Laws from the University of Calgary in 2004.

== Death ==
Fischer died in Calgary, Alberta on June 17, 2020.
