= George Una =

Canadian gridiron football player (born 1999)

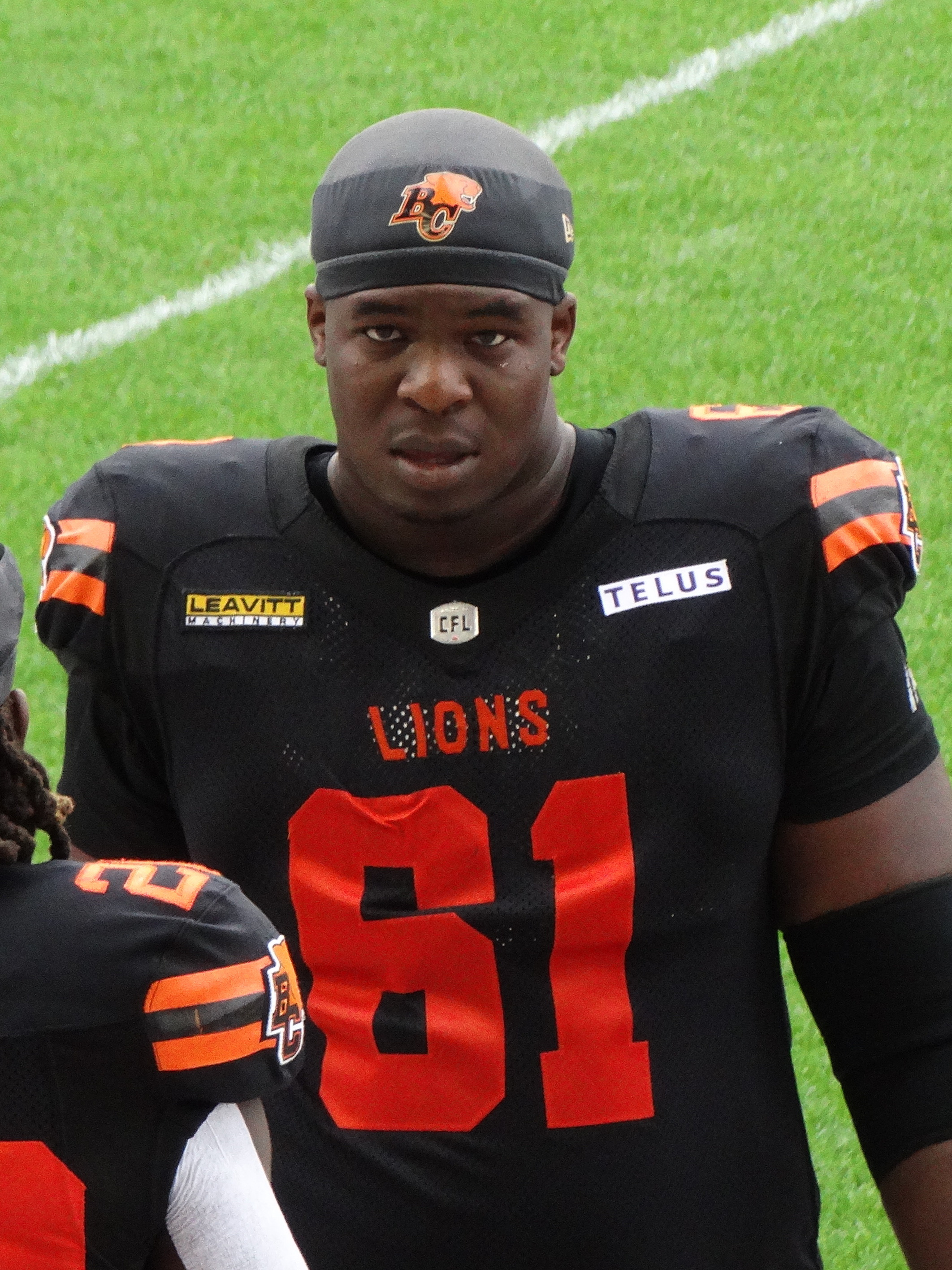
- Una with the BC Lions in 2025

No. 61 – BC Lions
- Position: Offensive lineman
- Roster status: Active
- CFL status: National

Personal information
- Born: March 22, 2000 (age 26); Toronto, Ontario, Canada
- Listed height: 6 ft 2 in (1.88 m)
- Listed weight: 313 lb (142 kg)

Career information
- University: Windsor
- CFL draft: 2024: 1st round, 6th overall pick

Career history
- 2024–present: BC Lions
- Stats at CFL.ca

Anu "George" Una (born March 22, 2000) is a Canadian professional football offensive lineman for the BC Lions of the Canadian Football League (CFL).

== University career ==
Una joined the Windsor Lancers of U Sports football as a walk-on in 2018 where he spent his first season as a redshirt. He played in seven games in his sophomore season in 2019, but did not play in 2020 due to the cancellation of the 2020 U Sports football season and did not play in 2021 due to eligibility issues. He returned to play and start in every game in 2022 and 2023, where he also recorded a four-yard touchdown reception on October 21, 2023, against the York Lions.

== Professional career ==
Pre-draft measurables
Height	Weight	40-yard dash	20-yard shuttle	Three-cone drill	Vertical jump	Broad jump	Bench press
6 ft 2 3/8 in (1.89 m)	313 lb (142 kg)	5.30 s	4.76 s	7.70 s	27.0 in (0.69 m)	8 ft 9 in (2.67 m)	24 reps
All values from CFL Combine

Una was selected in the first round, sixth overall, by the BC Lions in the 2024 CFL draft and signed with the team on May 7, 2024. Following training camp in 2024, he began the season on the injured list, but soon made his professional debut on July 13, 2024, against the Saskatchewan Roughriders. He played in two regular season games in 2024 while remaining on the injured list for the rest of the games that year. On June 6, 2025, Una was placed on the Lions' 1-game injured list to start the 2025 CFL season. He rejoined the active roster on June 26, 2025.

== Personal life ==
Una's parents immigrated to Canada from Nigeria. His tribal name is Anu, but he goes by George in professional settings.
