= Bramalea Secondary School =

Location
- 510 Balmoral Drive; Brampton, Ontario, L6T 1W4; Canada; 43.715302°N 79.707693°W

Information
- School type: Public High School
- Motto: "The future belongs to those who prepare for it."
- Founded: 1963
- School board: Peel District School Board
- Superintendent: Craig Caslick
- Area trustee: Karla Bailey; Kathy McDonald; Avneet Kaur Athwal (Student Trustee for Schools North of Hwy 401)
- School number: 895920
- Principal: Tina Sidhu
- Grades: 9–12
- Enrolment: 1085 (March 2026)
- Language: English, French Immersion
- Colours: Double Blue and White
- Mascot: Bruno the Bronco
- Team name: Bramalea Broncos
- Website: schools.peelschools.org/sec/bramalea/Pages/default.aspx
- Last updated: June 3, 2023

Bramalea Secondary School (BSS) is a high school located in Bramalea, Brampton, Ontario, operating under the Peel District School Board established in 1963.

== Demographics ==
In 2012, 307 students graduated. East Asians, South Asians, and Blacks made up almost 80% of the graduating class. In 1983, there were two black students and four South Asian students among the 142 graduating students. This demographic change followed a general change of demographics in the Bramalea community.

== Notable alumni and faculty ==
- Andrew Cassels, retired NHL Player
- Iqwinder Gaheer, Mississauga-Malton Federal MP
- Dave Cranmer, CFL halfback
- Alain Kashama, CFL and NFL defensive end
- Tara Oram, country singer
- Jasvir Rakkar, baseball player
- Todd Thicke, television writer and producer

== See also ==
- Education in Ontario
- List of secondary schools in Ontario
