= Paul Brule =

Canadian football player

Profile
- Positions: Running back, Defensive back

Personal information
- Born: February 21, 1945 (age 81); Montreal, Quebec, Canada
- Listed height: 6 ft 0 in (1.83 m)
- Listed weight: 205 lb (93 kg)

Career information
- University: St. Francis Xavier
- CFL draft: 1964: 1st round, 2nd overall pick

Career history
- 1968–1971: Winnipeg Blue Bombers
- 1972: Montreal Alouettes

Awards and highlights
- U Sports records: Most career touchdowns (51) Most single season touchdowns (25) Most single game touchdowns (8)
- Canadian Football Hall of Fame (Class of 2018)

Paul Brule (born February 21, 1945) is a Canadian former professional football player who starred at St. Francis Xavier University in the 1960s before playing professionally in the Canadian Football League. He was inducted in to the Canadian Football Hall of Fame in 2018.

== University football career (1964-1967) ==
Brule played fullback and defensive halfback at St. Francis Xavier University in Antigonish, Nova Scotia, Canada from 1964 to 1967.

In 1966 he set a Canadian university football record with 1103 yards rushing and became the first player in Canadian Interuniversity Sport history to score 20 touchdowns in a season. He also set a U Sports season record with 120 points scored. That season the St. Francis Xavier X-Men won the Vanier Cup Trophy as Canada's top university football team by beating Waterloo Lutheran University (now known as Wilfrid Laurier University) 40–14 in the 2nd Vanier Cup game at Varsity Stadium in Toronto.

Brule did not win another championship in 1967, but his senior year at St. Francis Xavier was perhaps his finest. He broke his own record for touchdowns in a season with 25. This included 21 rushing touchdowns, two receiving touchdowns, one punt return touchdown and one interception return touchdown. This record still stands as of the completion of the 2017 U Sports football season. Brule's 150 points in the 1967 season were also a new Canadian record. Remarkably, eight of Brule's touchdowns in 1967 came in a single game. On October 20, 1967, Brule scored seven rushing touchdowns and one punt return touchdown against Dalhousie University. This record still stands, as does his record of 48 points in a single game. He finished his four-year university career with 51 all-purpose touchdowns, a record that still stands as of the completion of the 2017 U Sports season.

=== U Sports records ===
When Brule graduated after the 1967 season, he held the records for most rushing yards in a season (1103), most touchdowns in a game (8), most touchdowns in a season (25), most touchdowns in a career (51), most points in a season (150) and most points in a career (306).

== Professional football career (1968-1972) ==
Brule was selected second overall in the first round of the Canadian Football League's 1968 amateur draft by the Ottawa Rough Riders.

Brule became the property of the Blue Bombers and played both fullback and defensive back for Winnipeg from 1968 to 1971. He enjoyed his most productive season offensively in his rookie year, when he rushed for 32 yards and one touchdown on 13 carries and caught five passes for 43 yards.

Defensively, Brule's best season was 1970, when he had nine interceptions to rank third in the West and earn a Western Conference All-Star selection at defensive back. Brule had another four interceptions in 1971 with Winnipeg before moving to the Montreal Alouettes for his final season in 1972. With Montreal, Brule had two more interceptions to raise his career total to 16.

Besides playing fullback and defensive back, Brule was also used as a punt returner and kick returner, averaging over seven yards per punt return for his career. His best season returning punts was 1969 when he finished second in the Western Conference with 498 yards.

== Career honours ==
Brule was inducted into the St. Francis Xavier University Sports Hall of Fame in 1988.

He was inducted into the Nova Scotia Football Hall of Fame in 2009.

In March 2018, it was announced that Brule would be inducted in to the Canadian Football Hall of Fame in the class of 2018. He was inducted in September 2018.

== Personal ==
Brule is the father of journalist, entrepreneur and magazine publisher Tyler Brûlé.
