= Phil Muntz =

Canadian aerophysicist and football player (1934–2017)

Profile
- Positions: Fullback, Halfback

Personal information
- Born: May 18, 1934; Hamilton, Ontario, Canada
- Died: August 1, 2017 (aged 83)
- Listed height: 5 ft 10 in (1.78 m)
- Listed weight: 195 lb (88 kg)

Career history
- 1956: Calgary Stampeders
- 1958–1959: Toronto Argonauts

Eric Phillip Muntz (May 18, 1934 – August 1, 2017) was a prominent American scientist and a former Canadian football player who played for the Calgary Stampeders in 1956 and Toronto Argonauts from 1957 to 1960. He previously played at the University of Toronto where he received a B.S. degree in Aeronautical Engineering in 1956 and a PhD in 1961 specializing in Aerophysics.

From 1969, Muntz was a professor at University of Southern California who made important contributions to the development of electron beam fluorescence technique as well as its applications for high-speed flow measurements. He was an inventor on over 25 patents.

In 1993, Muntz was elected a member of US National Academy of Engineering with the citation "For technical and academic leadership in rarified-gas dynamics and non-equilibrium flow phenomena".

In late 1990s and early 2000s, Muntz introduced and developed the concept of Knudsen compressor, a multi-stage vacuum pump with no moving parts or fluids. He died on August 1, 2017.
