= Lou Bruce (Canadian football) =

Canadian football player

Profile
- Position: End

Personal information
- Born: c. 1934; Toronto, Ontario, Canada
- Died: January 16, 1985 (aged 51); Ottawa, Ontario, Canada
- Listed height: 6 ft 0 in (1.83 m)
- Listed weight: 205 lb (93 kg)

Career information
- University: Queen's

Career history
- 1956–1960: Ottawa Rough Riders

Awards and highlights
- Grey Cup champion (1960); CFL East All-Star (1960)

Lou Bruce (c. 1934 – January 16, 1985) was a professional Canadian football end who played for the Ottawa Rough Riders for five seasons. He was drafted first overall in the 1956 CFL Draft by the Rough Riders. He was named an Eastern All-Star at the defensive end position for the 1960 season, the same year he won his first and only Grey Cup championship. He played football previously at Queen's University.
