= Ed Turek =

Canadian football player (born 1942)

Profile
- Positions: Quarterback, Running back, Defensive back

Personal information
- Born: November 6, 1942 (age 84)
- Listed height: 5 ft 11 in (1.80 m)
- Listed weight: 195 lb (88 kg)

Career information
- University: Waterloo Lutheran
- CFL draft: 1966: 1st round, 1st overall pick

Career history
- 1966: Edmonton Eskimos
- 1967–1971: Hamilton Tiger-Cats

Awards and highlights
- Grey Cup champion (1967)

Erhard Turek (born November 6, 1942) was a Canadian professional football player for the Edmonton Eskimos and Hamilton Tiger-Cats. He won the Grey Cup with them in 1967. He previously played football at Waterloo Lutheran University in Waterloo, Ontario.
