= Mike Eben =

Canadian football player

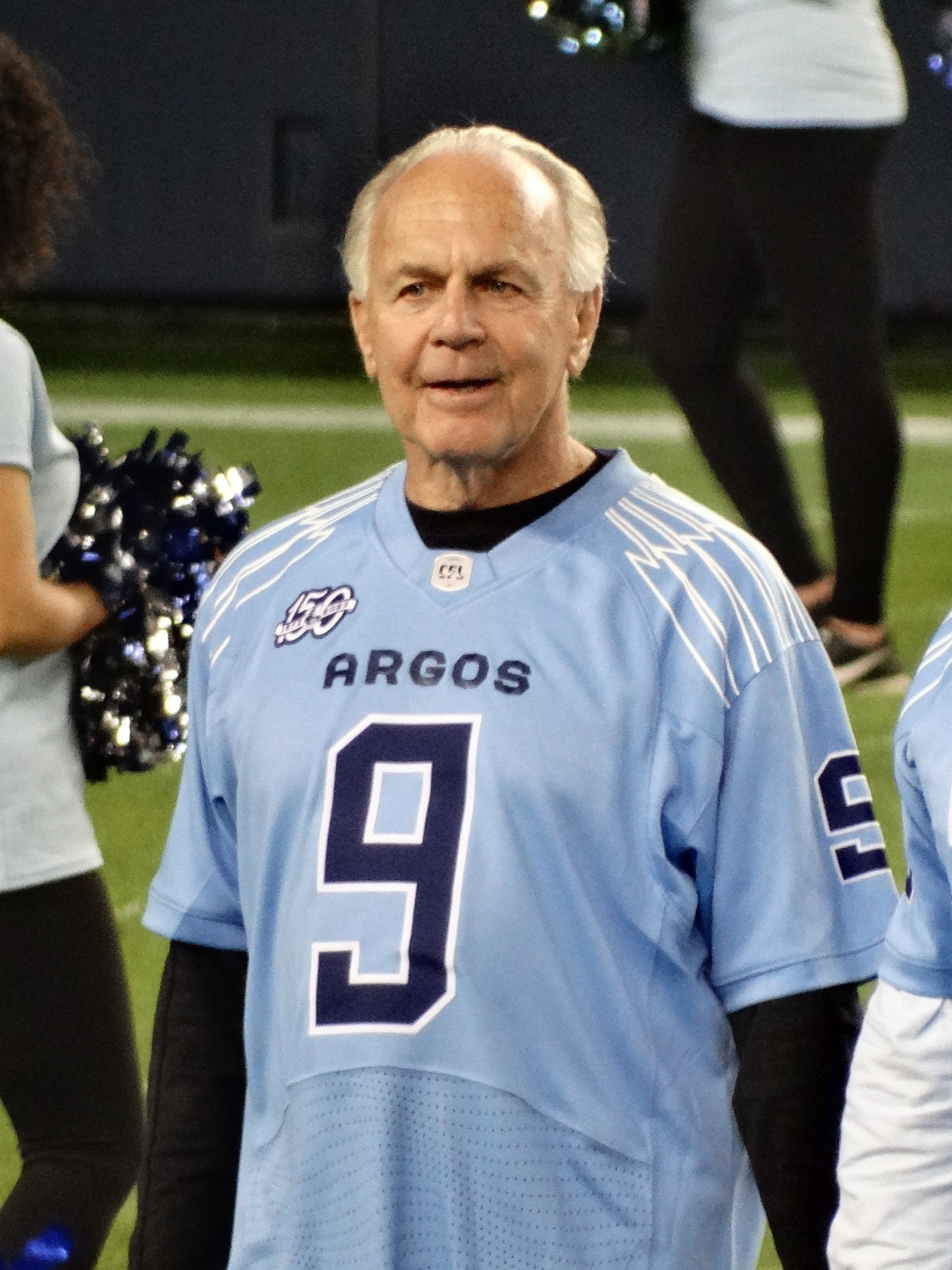
- Eben in 2023

Profile
- Position: Wide receiver

Personal information
- Born: January 29, 1946 (age 80); Žatec, Czechoslovakia
- Listed height: 6 ft 1 in (1.85 m)
- Listed weight: 183 lb (83 kg)

Career information
- University: Toronto
- CFL draft: 1968: 1st round, 1st overall pick

Career history
- 1968–1969: Toronto Argonauts
- 1970: Edmonton Eskimos
- 1971–1977: Toronto Argonauts
- 1977: Hamilton Tiger-Cats
- 1977: Ottawa Rough Riders

Awards and highlights
- 2× CFL East All-Star (1971, 1976); CFL West All-Star (1970); Hec Crighton Trophy (1967)

Michael Eben (born January 29, 1946) is a former wide receiver who played ten seasons in the Canadian Football League (CFL), mainly for the Toronto Argonauts. Eben also played for the Hamilton Tiger-Cats, Ottawa Rough Riders, and Edmonton Eskimos.

== University career ==
Eben played CIAU football for the Toronto Varsity Blues and won the Hec Crighton Trophy in 1967 as the most outstanding Canadian university player. While playing professional football, he earned his doctorate in German literature from the University of Toronto.

== Professional career ==
Eben was initially drafted by the BC Lions as the first overall draft pick in the 1968 CFL draft. He played for the Toronto Argonauts, Hamilton Tiger-Cats, Ottawa Rough Riders, and Edmonton Eskimos. Over his ten-year career, he was a divisional all-star three times.

== Personal life ==
He taught at Upper Canada College for 22 years. Eben taught French at Sterling Hall School, an independent school in Toronto, Canada following his retirement from UCC. He now consults at various schools in the Toronto area. Married with two children, Eben has been doing voice over work and narration for radio and television for more than fifteen years. He has done numerous commercials, sports promotions and recently was a German translator on the 10 part series "The Greatest Tank Battles" featured on The History Channel.
