= Craig McLeod =

Canadian football player (born 1948)

Profile
- Positions: Guard, Linebacker

Personal information
- Born: August 8, 1948; Moosomin, Saskatchewan, Canada
- Died: December 3, 2013 (aged 65); Courtenay, British Columbia, Canada
- Listed height: 6 ft 0 in (1.83 m)
- Listed weight: 210 lb (95 kg)

Career information
- University: Calgary

Career history
- 1971: Winnipeg Blue Bombers
- 1971: Calgary Stampeders

Awards and highlights
- Grey Cup champion (1971)

Craig McLeod (August 8, 1948 – December 3, 2013) was a Canadian professional football player who played for the Calgary Stampeders and Winnipeg Blue Bombers. He won the Grey Cup with Calgary in 1971. He played college football at the University of Calgary.
