= Jordan Williams (linebacker, born 1994) =

American gridiron football player (born 1994)

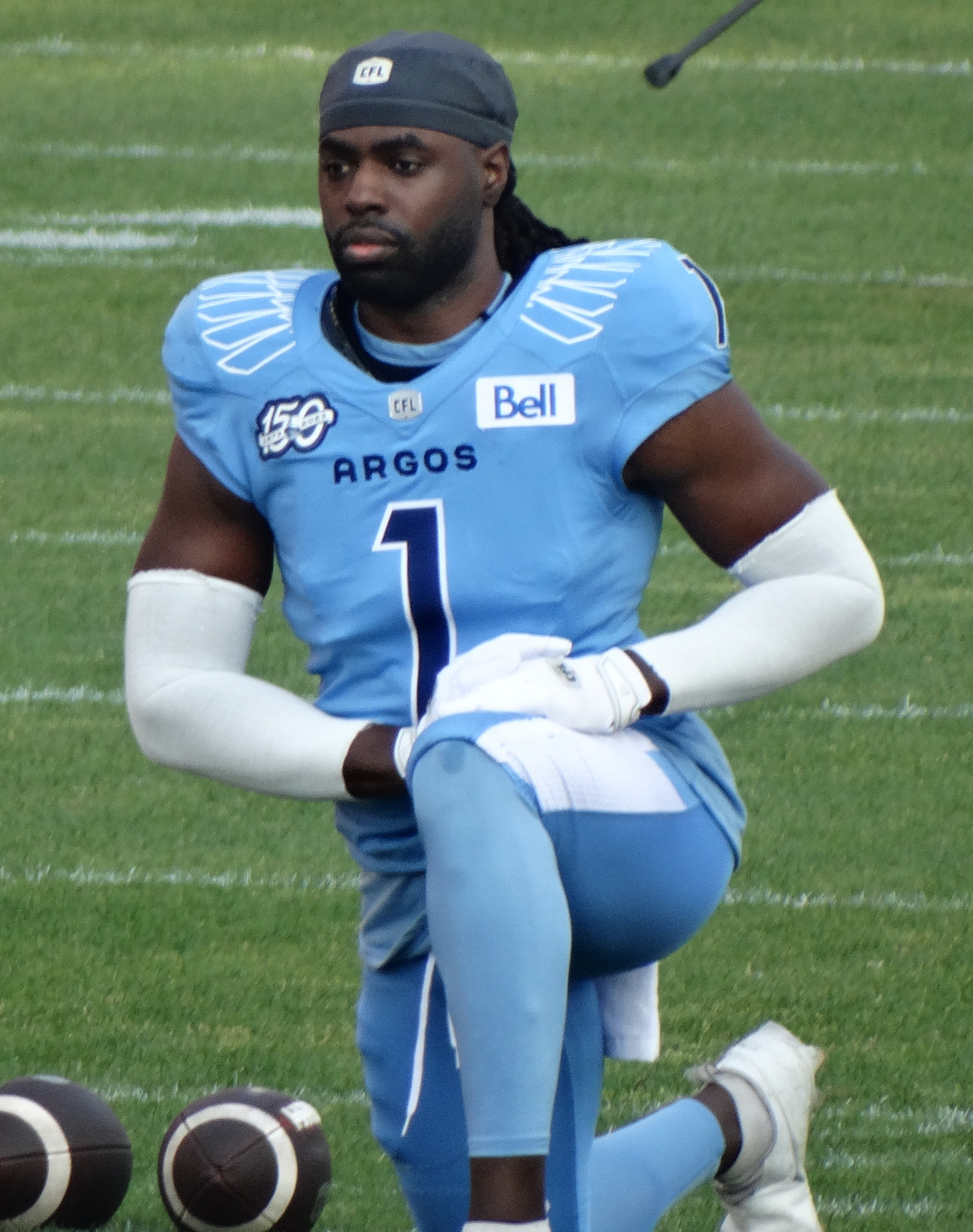
- Williams with the Toronto Argonauts in 2023

No. 21, 1
- Position: Linebacker

Personal information
- Born: November 23, 1994 (age 31); Baltimore, Maryland, U.S.
- Listed height: 6 ft 0 in (1.83 m)
- Listed weight: 230 lb (104 kg)

Career information
- High school: Jack Britt (Fayetteville, NC)
- College: East Carolina (2014–2017)
- CFL draft: 2020: 1st round, 1st overall pick

Career history
- 2021–2022: BC Lions
- 2023: Toronto Argonauts
- 2024: Hamilton Tiger-Cats*
- * Offseason or practice squad member only

Awards and highlights
- CFL's Most Outstanding Rookie Award (2021); Jackie Parker Trophy (2021)
- Stats at CFL.ca

Jordan Xavier Williams (born November 23, 1994) is an American-Canadian former professional football linebacker who played three seasons in the Canadian Football League (CFL). He was selected by the BC Lions with the first overall pick of the 2020 CFL draft. He played college football for the East Carolina Pirates.

== Early life ==
Because his mother was in the military, Williams moved around frequently in his youth, including Baltimore and Hawaii. Williams was a three-year letterwinner at Jack Britt High School in Fayetteville, North Carolina. He was twice an All-Mid-South 4-A Conference selection. However, his collegiate options were limited due to academic issues.

== College career ==
Williams joined East Carolina as a preferred walk-on after transferring from Shaw University as a freshman. He earned a scholarship and played nine games on special teams in the 2014 season as a redshirt freshman. Williams finished second in tackles with 81 as a sophomore while starting 10 of 12 games. He began his junior year as a backup, with Williams stating "They said I really didn't know how to communicate, so they were subbing me in at nickel to be like a speed guy to make tackles in the backfield or cover receivers down field." However, he later started the final five games and led the team in tackles that season with 77. Williams finished second on the team in tackles with 89 as a senior in 2017, including three for a loss and a forced fumble. In his career, Williams started 25 of 45 games and posted 252 tackles (123 solo), 13.0 tackles for loss, 3.0 sacks, two forced fumbles, three pass breakups and an interception. Williams also contributed 11 double-digit tackle performances. He earned a bachelor's degree from ECU in Health & Communications minor.

== Professional career ==
Pre-draft measurables
Height	Weight	Arm length	Hand span	40-yard dash	10-yard split	20-yard split	20-yard shuttle	Three-cone drill	Vertical jump	Broad jump	Bench press
5 ft 11 3/8 in (1.81 m)	227 lb (103 kg)	32 7/8 in (0.84 m)	9 7/8 in (0.25 m)	4.66 s	1.64 s	2.66 s	4.38 s	7.45 s	34.5 in (0.88 m)	10 ft 1 in (3.07 m)	23 reps
All values from Pro Day

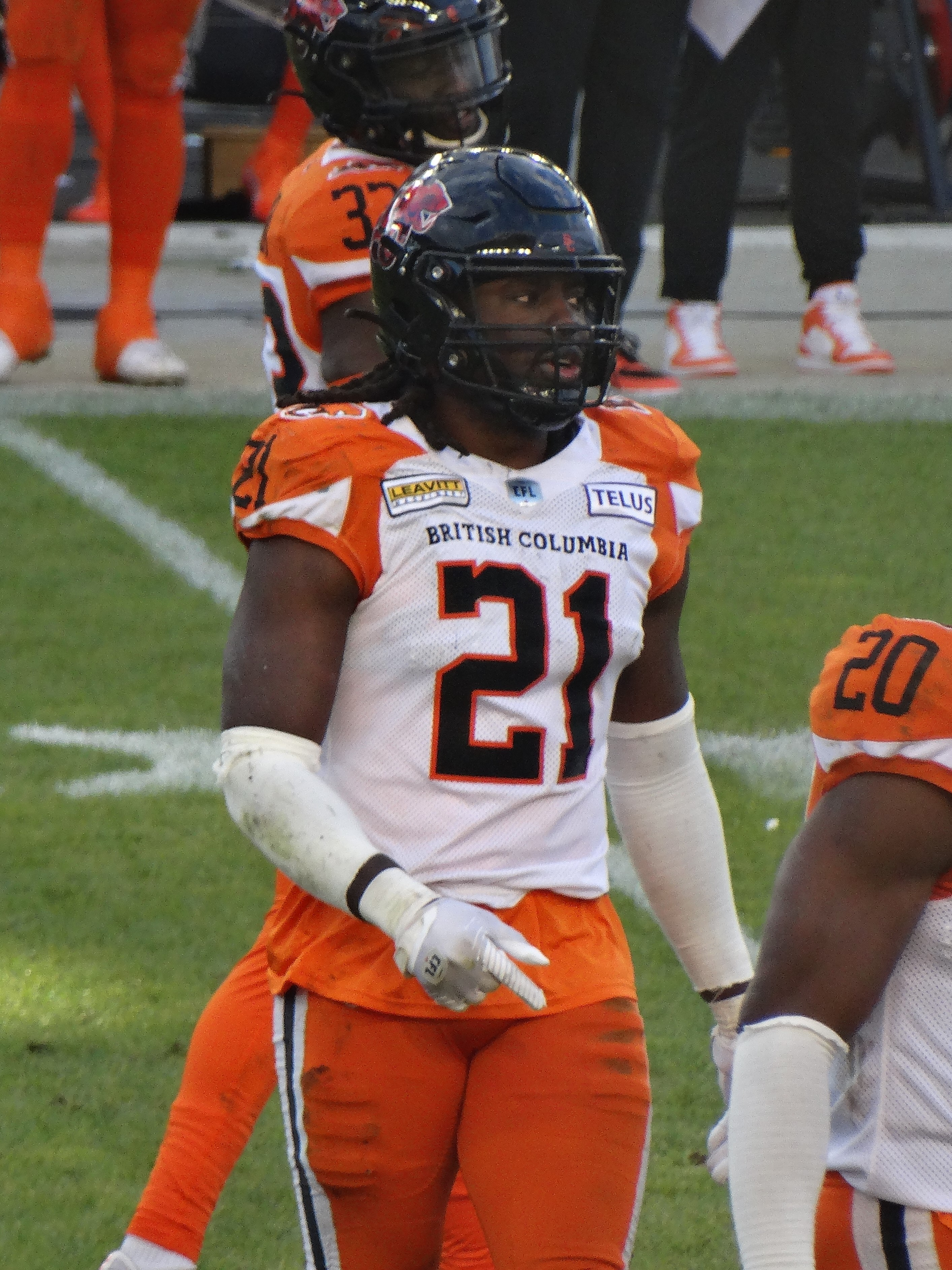
Williams with the BC Lions in 2022

=== Early career ===
Williams tried out for the San Francisco 49ers in 2018 but was not signed. He continued to train and received Canadian citizenship. He nearly joined the Ottawa Redblacks out of training camp in 2019, but was convinced to enter the CFL draft since his mother was Canadian.

=== BC Lions ===
Williams was drafted first overall in the 2020 CFL draft by the BC Lions. The number one pick was originally held by the Ottawa Redblacks, who dealt the pick the Calgary Stampeders, who subsequently traded the pick to the Lions on draft day. He did not play in 2020 due to the cancellation of the 2020 CFL season and was officially signed by the Lions on May 5, 2021. Williams had an outstanding 2021 season with the Lions, and set a CFL record for most defensive tackles in a season by a Canadian rookie with 92, surpassing the previous high of 75 set by Mike O'Shea in 1993. Following his impressive 2021 season, Williams was named the CFL's Most Outstanding Rookie and was just the second number one draft pick to win the award.

=== Toronto Argonauts ===
On February 9, 2023, it was announced that Williams had been traded to the Toronto Argonauts in exchange for a first-round pick in the 2023 CFL draft. He played in 14 regular season games in 2023, starting in 13, where he had 48 defensive tackles and four special teams tackles.

=== Hamilton Tiger-Cats ===
On January 29, 2024, Williams was traded to the Hamilton Tiger-Cats in an exchange of draft picks and for the negotiation rights to Deontay Burnett. However, on May 8, 2024, it was announced that Williams had retired.
