= Gary Strickler =

American athletic director

Biographical details
- Born: 1941; Winchester, Virginia, U.S.
- Died: July 30, 2018 (aged 77); Winchester, Virginia, U.S.
- Education: Randolph–Macon College; Boston University

Administrative career (AD unless noted)
- 1988–1989: Boston University (Asst. AD)
- 1989–2004: Boston University

Charles Garland "Gary" Strickler (1941–2018) was an American academic administrator who served as athletic director at Boston University from 1989 to 2004.

== Early life ==
Strickler grew up in Stephens City, Virginia. He received his bachelor's degree in English from Randolph–Macon College in 1963. In 1963, he and five other students petitioned the school's the board of trustees to admit black students. He then attended, Boston University, where he earned his master's of sacred theology in 1967 and his master's in education in 1971.

== Career ==
After three years as a Methodist minister in Central Massachusetts, Strickler returned to BU pursue a career in education. From 1969 to 1971 he was a staff counselor at the Boston University School of Management. He then served as the School of Management's assistant dean for undergraduate programs for the next 13 years. He was the assistant dean for graduate programs from 1984 to 1987 and the associate dean from 1987 to 1988. He also served on BU's athletic council and was its chairman for three years.

In 1988, Strickler was named BU's assistant athletic director. In this role he was the school's liaison to the National Collegiate Athletic Association for compliance and eligibility and the athletic department's liaison with academic advisors. In February 1989, after Jack Parker resigned as athletic director after two weeks on the job, Strickler succeeded him on an acting basis. He was given the job full-time on October 20, 1989. Under Strickler's leadership, BU won 85 conference championships, made 55 NCAA tournament appearances, and three national titles. During his tenure, the number of athletic programs increased from 10 men's teams and 6 women's teams to 12 women's teams 11 men's teams. He also oversaw the construction of also oversaw the construction of the Agganis Arena, Boston University Track and Tennis Center, and DeWolfe Boathouse, the renovation of BU Softball Field, and the resurfacing of Nickerson Field. He was also athletic director when university's board of trustees and president John Silber made the controversial decision to eliminate its football program. Strickler retired on July 1, 2004.

== Later life ==
After leaving Boston University, Strickler returned to Frederick County, Virginia. He died on July 30, 2018, at the age of 77. He was survived by his wife of 55 years and a daughter.
