= Peter Martin (Canadian football) =

Pete Martin
Profile
- Positions: End, Guard

Personal information
- Born: March 21, 1920; Regina, Saskatchewan, Canada
- Died: March 23, 1996 (aged 76); Regina, Saskatchewan, Canada
- Listed height: 5 ft 11 in (1.80 m)
- Listed weight: 198 lb (90 kg)

Career history
- 1946–1951: Saskatchewan Roughriders

Peter Campbell Martin (March 21, 1920 – March 23, 1996) was a Canadian professional football player who played for the Saskatchewan Roughriders. He played junior football in Regina. He was included on the Roughriders' Plaza of Honor in 1990.
