= Chuck Liebrock =

Canadian football player

Profile
- Position: Guard

Personal information
- Born: May 24, 1945 (age 81)

Career information
- University: Hillsdale College

Career history
- 1968–1969: Toronto Argonauts
- 1970–1977: Winnipeg Blue Bombers

Chuck Liebrock (born May 24, 1945) is a Canadian former professional football offensive lineman who played ten seasons in the Canadian Football League.
