= Bids for the 1988 Winter Olympics =

Overview
- XV Olympic Winter Games
- Winner: Calgary; Runner-up: Falun; Shortlist: Cortina d'Ampezzo

Details
- Committee: IOC
- Election venue: 84th IOC Session; Baden-Baden, West Germany

Map of the bidding cities
- Missing location of the bidding cities

Important dates
- Decision: 30 September 1981

Decision
- Winner: Calgary (48 votes)
- Runner-up: Falun (31 votes)

The selection process for the 1988 Winter Olympics consisted of three bids, and saw Calgary, Alberta, Canada, be selected ahead of Falun, Sweden, and Cortina d'Ampezzo, Italy. The selection was made at the 84th International Olympic Committee (IOC) Session in Baden-Baden, West Germany, on 30 September 1981.

== Background ==
Calgary was one of three cities and towns that bid officially for the 1988 Winter Olympics. The other two were Falun, Sweden, and Cortina d'Ampezzo, Italy. The Italian town (comune) had before hosted the 1956 Winter Olympics. The IOC required formal bids to be submitted by November 30, 1980.

The vote was held on September 30, 1981, in Baden-Baden, West Germany, during the 84th IOC Session and 11th Olympic Congress. After Cortina d'Ampezzo was eliminated in the first round of balloting, Calgary won in the second and final round of balloting over Falun, by a margin of 17 votes.

== Candidate cities overview ==
=== Calgary ===
Calgary's bid for the 1988 Winter Olympic Games was Canada's seventh and Calgary's fourth attempt at hosting the Winter Games. The first Canadian bid for Winter Games was organized by the City of Montreal in 1956. At the 43rd Olympic Congress, Cortina d'Ampezzo, Italy was chosen as the host for the 1956 Winter Games on the first ballot with 31 votes, and Montreal came second with 7 votes. The Canadian Olympic Committee previously submitted two bids for the City of Vancouver, first for 1976 which was awarded to Denver, and Vancouver was eliminated on the first ballot; and secondly for the 1980 Games which was withdrawn prior to the Olympic Congress when the new provincial government under Premier Dave Barrett withdrew support for the bid. The Canadian Olympic Committee had previously submitted three bids for Calgary, first under the direction of the Calgary Olympic Development Association (CODA) for the 1964 Games where Calgary finished second to Innsbruck, Austria; the second attempt for the 1968 Games saw Grenoble, France awarded the Games on the third ballot with 27 votes to Calgary's 24 votes; and the third attempt was for the 1972 Games for the nearby Town of Banff which finished second to Sapporo, Japan. After the unsuccessful bid for the 1972 Games, the third consecutive failed bid, CODA was laid dormant.

In 1978, CODA was revived by Frank King and Bob Niven of Calgary's Booster Club, who took over the organization's leadership. King and Niven brought some members from previous bids back including former Olympic Sprinter and CODA founder Ernie McCullough, and politician Arthur Ryan Smith to consult on the project.

In October 1979, CODA was able to secure the Canadian Olympic Association's (COA) support as Canada's official bid for the 1988 Winter Olympics over a competing bid by Vancouver by a vote of 27–9. Calgary's bid was bold, estimated at CA$217 million, CODA proposed constructing all new venues to overcome the city's lack of winter sports facilities with the argument that Canada's inventory of elite sport training facilities would grow significantly if Calgary was awarded the Games. The defeated Vancouver organizing group lamented that they lost to Calgary's "Big-ticket Games" idea, which was estimated to cost nearly three times what the Vancouver group was expected to pay to host the Winter Olympics. Vancouver's low-cost bid which was estimated at CA$30 million, leveraged already developed infrastructure, including the Pacific Coliseum and Whistler Blackcomb, although the low estimated cost was met with skepticism from COA delegates. Delegates noted that the previous loss of provincial support in the 1980 Vancouver bid, the possible financial security of Alberta's newly created Heritage Savings Trust Fund, and Calgary's commitment to amateur sport development weighed heavily on results.

Next, CODA spent two years building local support for the megaproject, selling largely symbolic CA$5 memberships to approximately 80,000 of Calgary's 600,000 residents. Calgary had further secured significant funding commitments from the Government of Canada totalling CA$200 million, and Alberta's government totalling CA$70 million (with an additional CA$53 million loan), while some civic leaders, including then-mayor Ralph Klein, crisscrossed the world to favour IOC delegates. Driven by the arrival of the National Hockey League's (NHL) newly relocated Calgary Flames from Atlanta in 1980, the city had already begun constructing a new NHL arena that would be later named the Olympic Saddledome. That course of action demonstrated to the IOC Calgary's determination in wanting to host the Winter Olympics.

Calgary's bid grew in size and scope between 1979 and 1981. The bid book presented at the 84th IOC session had an estimated total cost of CA$331 million, with CA$92 million in operating costs and CA$239 million in capital costs. An additional CA$30 million was allocated for an endowment fund to cover additional operating costs and another CA$54 million for a contingency fund. The largest included cost was the construction of the new 18,000-seat arena, budgeted for CA$69 million, which would host ice hockey and figure skating. Preliminary ice hockey and figure skating events were to be scheduled at the already-constructed Stampede Corral and Max Bell Arena. Other Calgary-based facilities included the CA$15 million Olympic Oval for speed skating, which the bid considered, but did not commit to being an indoor facility. The nearby Bragg Creek area was designated as the host location for CA$8 million ski jumping facility, CA$15 million bobsleigh and luge facility, and a CA$6 million cross-country and biathlon facility. A new Alpine Centre was set to be built in the Spray Lake area on Mount Sparrowhawk and Mount Shark at a cost of CA$13 million to host alpine skiing events. In the lead-up to the Games, OCO'88 relocated each proposed venue, except the Olympic Oval.

In the days leading up to the selection, OCO'88 made a number of changes to entice the IOC delegates to choose Calgary. OCO'88 committed CA$30 million to subsidize travel for athletes participating in the Games, this came after concerns from European delegations that travel to North America would be more expensive than the two European bids.

Calgary's Olympic bid itself emphasized the cultural and natural beauty of Calgary and surrounding areas, as an asset for hosting the Winter Olympics. The city was marketed as a capitalist, oil-driven, and modern economy that also had mountain playgrounds, extensive wilderness, and western rodeo culture. The two seemingly contradictory images were brought together, as part of an extensive and diverse lobbying program.

CODA spent around $2.5 million on the bid process which included technical studies, and tours for 32 of the 82 IOC delegates in what was described as "VIP style".

=== Falun ===
The Falun for the 1988 Winter Games was unsuccessful. A key issue identified by IOC officials was the lack of acceptable locations where alpine events could be hosted near the city. The Falun bid planned to host alpine events approximately 400 kilometres away from the city. The Falun organizers had many of the necessary facilities already built and had a budget of US$100 million. Falun organizers called for reform in the bidding process, noting they were not sure what the IOC used to choose successful bids, and Lennart Hallberg stated "It would be far better if the rules were simpler, clear and the whole competition was like a tendering process."

=== Cortina d'Ampezzo ===
Cortina d'Ampezzo previously hosted the 1956 Winter Olympics. The Cortina d'Ampezzo bid operating budget was not released during the bidding process, and was kept secret from IOC members. After the Games were awarded to Calgary, Cortina d'Ampezzo officials claimed they expected to spend between $5–$50 million on the Games if they had won.

== Aftermath ==
The announcement of CODA's victory sent the delegates in Baden-Baden and Calgary residents into singing and dancing. It also made then Alberta premier, Peter Lougheed, burst openly into tears in front of the cameras. Later, Ralph Klein sang a rendition of Mac Davis' It's Hard to Be Humble. It was the first Winter Olympics awarded to Canada and the second Olympic Games overall, following the 1976 Summer Olympics in Montreal. Cortina d'Ampezzo, along with Milan, would get to host the 2026 Winter Olympics. The town would be the fourth one to host the Winter Olympics twice, along with St. Moritz (1928 and 1948), Lake Placid (1932 and 1980), and Innsbruck (1964 and 1976).

Olympic historians, John E. Findling and Kimberly D. Pelle, noted that once the Games were awarded to Calgary, the cultural and community aspects of the bid were pushed aside by the newly formed Calgary Olympic organizing committee called the Olympiques Calgary Olympics '88 (OCO'88). It then proceeded to take on a "vigorous, resilient, and impersonal corporate business strategy" towards the planning and operation of the Games.

== Votes results of the 1988 Winter Olympics ==
IOC voting – September 1981
City	Country	Round 1	Round 2
Calgary	Canada	35	48
Falun	Sweden	25	31
Cortina d'Ampezzo	Italy	18	—
