= Roy Shatzko =

No. 55
- Position: Defensive tackle

Personal information
- Born: April 4, 1940; Vancouver, British Columbia
- Died: December 10, 2009 (aged 69); Vancouver, British Columbia

Career information
- College: University of British Columbia
- CFL draft: 1965

Career history
- 1965–1966: BC Lions
- 1967–1972: Edmonton Eskimos

Awards and highlights
- 1970 CFL All Star Game; Edmonton Eskimos' 1968 nominee as Most Outstanding Canadian Player

Roy Shatzko (April 4, 1940 – December 10, 2009) was a Canadian Football League defensive tackle who played for the BC Lions and Edmonton Eskimos. Drafted by the Calgary Stampeders in the CFL College Draft in February, 1965, he was traded to his hometown BC Lions before the start of that season. Joining "The Headhunters", the talented Lions defense which helped B.C. win its first Grey Cup in 1964, he backed up Mike Cacic and Dick Fouts.

Shatzko was traded to Edmonton at the start of the 1967 CFL season, and played five full seasons for the Eskimos. He retired after the first game of the 1972 season. He was credited with three fumble recoveries in his 112-game CFL career, was the Eskimos' 1968 Nominee as Most Outstanding Canadian Player, and was selected as an alternate to the 1970 CFL All-Star team which played the defending Grey Cup Champion Ottawa Rough Riders in the 1970 All-Star Game.
