= Dave Clarke (Canadian football) =

Canadian football player (born 1950)

Profile
- Position: Defensive back

Personal information
- Born: February 14, 1949 (age 77)
- Listed height: 5 ft 10 in (1.78 m)
- Listed weight: 175 lb (79 kg)

Career information
- University: Guelph

Career history
- 1972: Hamilton Tiger-Cats

Awards and highlights
- Grey Cup champion (1972)

Dave Clarke (born February 14, 1950) was a Canadian professional football player who played for the Hamilton Tiger-Cats. He won the Grey Cup with Hamilton in 1972. He played college football at the University of Guelph.
