= Jim Foley =

Canadian football player (born 1946)

Profile
- Position: Slotback

Personal information
- Born: October 27, 1946 (age 80); Ottawa, Ontario, Canada

Career information
- College: Saint Dunstan's University

Career history
- 1971–1972: Montreal Alouettes
- 1973–1977: Ottawa Rough Riders

Awards and highlights
- 2× Grey Cup champion (1973, 1976); CFL's Most Outstanding Canadian Award (1975); Gruen Trophy (1971)

Jim Foley (born October 27, 1946) is a former award-winning slotback in the Canadian Football League. He was drafted by the Montreal Alouettes in the 1970 CFL College Draft, winning the CFL's Rookie of the Year Award in 1971, and later won the 1975 Most Outstanding Canadian Award and two Grey Cups with the Ottawa Rough Riders.

== Career ==
He attended St. Dunstan's University, later to become the University of Prince Edward Island, and played football from 1966 to 1969. He is one of the few professional football players to come from UPEI. Foley was named the team's Most Valuable Player and the top athlete for 3 consecutive years. In his junior year Foley was also MVP of the Bluenose Conference. He was also the rushing leader with 809 yards and the rushing average leader at 9.6 yards per carry. In his senior year, now playing for the UPEI Panthers, Foley led the league in kickoff return yards (377) and the highest kick return average. He was also named UPEI’s first Male Athlete of the Year. Over four seasons of collegiate football, Foley scored 198 points and rushed for 2376 yards. Jim Foley was inducted into UPEI Sports Hall of Fame and to the Prince Edward Island Football Hall of Fame.

He began his 7-year CFL career in 1971 with the Montreal Alouettes, playing 2 seasons with them. In his first year, he was good enough to win the Gruen Trophy as top rookie in the Eastern Conference. He moved to the Ottawa Rough Riders in 1973, where he helped the Riders to a Grey Cup win. He was named the CFL's Most Outstanding Canadian Award winner in 1975. He would play 5 seasons in Ottawa. In 1976 he had 56 receptions for 847 yards and was part of the classic 1976 64th Grey Cup game victory. He was inducted into the Ottawa Sports Hall of Fame in 2010.

== Awards ==
- Ottawa Sports Hall of Fame (2010)
- UPEI Sports Hall of Fame
- Prince Edward Island Football Hall of Fame
