= Tom Schultz (Canadian football) =

Canadian football player

Profile
- Position: Linebacker

Personal information
- Born: January 4, 1947 (age 79); Ottawa, Ontario, Canada
- Listed height: 6 ft 3 in (1.91 m)
- Listed weight: 222 lb (101 kg)

Career history
- 1971–1974: Ottawa Rough Riders

Awards and highlights
- Grey Cup champion (1973)

Tom Schultz (born January 4, 1947) is a retired Canadian football player who played for the Ottawa Rough Riders. He played college football at Queen's University.
