= William J. Warren =

Chancellor of the University of Calgary
- In office 2002–2006
- Preceded by: Jack Perraton
- Succeeded by: Joanne Cuthbertson

Personal details
- Born: 1939 (age 85–86)
- Occupation: lawyer

William J. Warren, CM QC (born 1939) is a Canadian lawyer who was the chancellor of the University of Calgary in Alberta from 2002 until 2006. Warren was named to the Alberta bar in 1963 and appointed Queen's Counsel in 1984. He also chaired the Calgary Olympic Development Association for the 1988 Olympics in Calgary. He is also a member of the Order of Canada, appointed in 2003.
