= Keith Eaman =

Canadian football player

No. 25, 16
- Position: Wide receiver

Personal information
- Born: August 14, 1947 (age 79); Montreal, Quebec, Canada
- Listed height: 5 ft 10 in (1.78 m)
- Listed weight: 202 lb (92 kg)

Career information
- University: Queen's

Career history
- 1971–1973: Ottawa Rough Riders
- 1974–1975: Montreal Alouettes

Awards and highlights
- Grey Cup champion (1974)

Keith "Skip" Eaman (born August 14, 1947) is a Canadian former professional football wide receiver who played four seasons in the Canadian Football League with the Ottawa Rough Riders and Montreal Alouettes. He played CIS football at Queen's University.

== Early life ==
Eaman was born on August 14, 1948, in Montreal, Quebec, Canada.

== College career ==
Eaman played CIS football for the Queen's Golden Gaels. He was a first team conference All-Star in 1969 and 1970 as a running back. the Gaels won the 4th Vanier Cup on November 22, 1968 against the Wilfrid Laurier Golden Hawks.

== Professional career ==
Eaman was a member of the Ottawa Rough Riders from 1971 to 1973 but saw no playing time in 1973.

Eaman played for the Montreal Alouettes from 1974 to 1975, winning the 62nd Grey Cup in 1974.
