= William Pratt (businessman) =

Canadian businessman

William "Bill" D. Pratt
- Born: November 8, 1928; Canada
- Died: November 27, 1999 (aged 71)
- Occupation: Businessman
- Known for: Chair of the 1988 Winter Olympics in Calgary
- Awards: Order of Canada

William "Bill" D. Pratt, OC (8 November 1928 – 27 November 1999), was a Canadian businessman who was chair of the Calgary Olympics, co-founder of the Canada Trail, and member of both the Olympic Order and the Order of Canada.

== Early life ==
Bill Pratt was born on 8 November 1928 and began his career at Lisgar Collegiate Institute in Ottawa from 1942 to 1947. While at Lisgar, Bill could forge principal Johnny Dunlop's signature for the use of himself and friends. Forty years later in the Lisgar Alumni office, he made two or three tries before he got it right again. His grandfather was a blacksmith with a four-man blacksmith shop in the town of North Gower, Ontario.

His high school summers were spent working for the Standard Holdings Group near Calgary where he was to be employed full-time from 1948 for the next 21 years, rising from a construction labourer to general manager. Pratt's mentor and friend Red Dutton, the old NHL hockey star and later one of the most active real estate developers in Calgary, gave him his first job, picking rocks in the high mountains to the west of Calgary. Pratt worked so hard Dutton kept him on the payroll, even after Bill went back to school in the fall.

== Career ==
In the early 1960s his firm loaned his services to manage the construction of Heritage Park in the city. When completed, Bill received Alberta's Award for Excellence in Park Development.

In 1969, after serving as a volunteer for 14 years with the Calgary Exhibition and Stampede, he joined its permanent staff and was soon its general manager. Over the next decade the Stampede rose from a $3 million to a $30 million event annually and its volunteer force doubled to over 4,000. Under his leadership, attendance surpassed the million mark.

In 1979 he was the first person to be appointed to both the Hall of Honour, Canadian Association of Exhibitions, and to the Hall of Fame, International Association of Fairs and Expositions.

He helped build Calgary's Chinook Shopping Centre, the Stampede Park grandstand, McMahon Stadium and Covenant House in Eagle Ridge (Alberta's first condominium).

== Olympics ==
Bill Pratt retired in 1979 but within a year he was in harness again as project manager of the Olympic Saddledome. By June 1983 he was appointed President of the Organizing Committee for the XV Winter Olympics in Calgary. Pratt once described himself as intolerant of “bullshit and wimps".

It was Bill Pratt, the former contractor who took over as Calgary Organizing Committee (COC) president in 1983, and who supervised the enormous construction project. Says Donald Jacques, general manager of the Calgary Exhibition and Stampede: “Because of him, everything was built on time and on budget.” But Pratt rubbed many colleagues the wrong way. As a former co-worker predicted in 1983: “He will get everything built. There may not be many left around to enjoy it, but he’ll get it done.” His relations with the media were also difficult at times. He had barely settled into his job when the Calgary press began criticizing the committee for excessive secrecy and for awarding Olympic contracts to the Calgary public relations firm of Francis Williams and Johnson, where Pratt had been a director, COC insisted there was no conflict of interest. Declares Pratt: “I have been nailed for a lot, but that does not bother me. The record stands.”

== Later life ==
He worked in Ottawa for the Canada 125th Anniversary organization as general manager. launched the Trans Canada Trail Foundation for the 15,000-km Trans Canada Trail.

He also helped the city secure the 1993 Grey Cup game and helped put out oil well fires in Kuwait.

Diagnosed in January 1999 with Amyotrophic lateral sclerosis (ALS) or Lou Gehrig's disease, he later suffered a spinal stroke which left him without the use of his legs (temporarily, he said). Claiming it was just another opportunity for him, he began campaigning for funds for ALS research, including some $20,000 for the Bill Pratt Living Legacy for ALS Endowment Fund.

He died on 27 November 1999.

== Honours ==
=== Order of Canada ===
On 1 November 1991, Pratt was awarded the Order of Canada for his contributions to the Olympics and Calgary Sports. He was president and chief operating officer of the XV Olympic Winter Games Organizing Committee (Calgary), 1983–88, where he managed the construction of new sports facilities and raised funds to support the Games. General manager for the Calgary Exhibition and Stampede for ten years, his contributions to the Stampede organization have made it a landmark of the Canadian cultural experience.

The award was presented personally to Pratt by Ray Hnatyshyn, Governor General of Canada, 29 April 1992 at a ceremony at Rideau Hall.

=== Other ===
He also received the Alberta Award of Excellence, the Canada 125 Medal and the Olympic Order.

Rocky Ridge/Royal Oak is home to the William D. Pratt School in the northwest of Calgary, opened in fall 2016.
