= Barry Mitchelson =

Canadian football player (born c. 1942)

Profile
- Positions: End, Kicker

Personal information
- Born: c. 1942 (age 83–84)
- Listed height: 6 ft 5 in (1.96 m)
- Listed weight: 230 lb (104 kg)

Career information
- University: Western Ontario
- CFL draft: 1964: 1st round, 1st overall pick

Career history
- 1964–1966: Edmonton Eskimos
- 1966: Toronto Argonauts

Edward Barry Mitchelson (born c. 1942) is a retired Canadian football player who played for the Edmonton Eskimos and Toronto Argonauts. He played college football at the University of Western Ontario.

While playing for the Eskimos, Mitchelson attended the University of Alberta and was a member of the school's basketball team. He joined the school's faculty in 1967 and was head men's basketball coach for nine seasons. From 1981 to 1988, he was deputy minister of Alberta recreation and parks. He was a member of the Board of Directors for Calgary Olympic Organizing Committee of the 1988 Winter Olympics.
