= Patrick Burke (defensive back) =

Jamaican gridiron football player (born 1968)

Retired
- Position: Defensive back
- Roster status: Retired
- CFL status: National

Personal information
- Born: November 6, 1968 (age 58); Jamaica
- Listed height: 5 ft 11 in (1.80 m)
- Listed weight: 180 lb (82 kg)

Career information
- College: Fresno City
- CFL draft: 1993: 1st round, 1st overall pick

Career history
- 1993–1995: Ottawa Rough Riders
- 1995: Toronto Argonauts
- 1997–1998: Saskatchewan Roughriders
- 1998: Winnipeg Blue Bombers

Patrick Burke (born November 6, 1968, in Jamaica) is a retired professional Canadian football defensive back who played for five seasons in the Canadian Football League for the Ottawa Rough Riders, Toronto Argonauts, Saskatchewan Roughriders, and Winnipeg Blue Bombers. He was drafted first overall in the 1993 CFL draft by the BC Lions. He played college football for Butler Community College and Fresno City College.
