= Paul McKay (Canadian football) =

Canadian football player (born 1947)

Profile
- Positions: Defensive back, Punter

Personal information
- Born: c. 1947 (age 78–79)
- Listed height: 6 ft 0 in (1.83 m)
- Listed weight: 195 lb (88 kg)

Career information
- University: Toronto

Career history
- 1970–1972: Hamilton Tiger-Cats
- 1974: Calgary Stampeders

Awards and highlights
- Grey Cup champion (1972)

Paul McKay (born c. 1947) was a Canadian professional football player who played for the Hamilton Tiger-Cats and Calgary Stampeders. He won the Grey Cup with Hamilton in 1972. He played college football at the University of Toronto.
