= Doug MacKenzie (Canadian football) =

Canadian football player (1936–2019)

Profile
- Position: Fullback

Personal information
- Born: 1936; Wallaceburg, Ontario, Canada
- Died: April 26, 2019 (aged 82–83); London, Ontario, Canada
- Listed height: 5 ft 10 in (1.78 m)
- Listed weight: 190 lb (86 kg)

Career information
- University: Western Ontario

Career history
- 1959, 1961: Saskatchewan Roughriders

Albert E. Douglas MacKenzie (1936 – April 26, 2019) was a Canadian professional football player who played for the Saskatchewan Roughriders. He later was ordained as an Anglican priest in 1986.
