= Bill Britton (Canadian football) =

Canadian football player (1934–2017)

Profile
- Positions: Fullback, linebacker, punt returner, kick returner

Personal information
- Born: December 15, 1934; Kirkland Lake, Ontario
- Died: February 6, 2017 (aged 82); Calgary, Alberta
- Listed height: 5 ft 11 in (1.80 m)
- Listed weight: 200 lb (91 kg)

Career information
- College: Western Ontario

Career history
- 1958–1961: BC Lions
- 1962–1964: Calgary Stampeders

William Leonard Britton (December 15, 1934 – February 6, 2017) was a Canadian professional football linebacker and fullback as well as occasional punt returner and kick returner for the BC Lions and Calgary Stampeders.

Bill Britton played college football at the University of Western Ontario. He joined the BC Lions in 1958 and played 4 years with them. He then played 3 more years with the Calgary Stampeders as a result of a 3-team trade that also involved Toronto. As a fullback in his first two years, he rushed for 210 and 242 yards, but then settled mostly at linebacker. In his career, he intercepted 10 balls and recovered 9 fumbles. He died in Calgary on February 6, 2017, at the age of 82.
