= 1993 CFL draft =

Canadian football draft

The 1993 CFL draft composed of seven rounds where 54 Canadian football players were chosen from eligible Canadian universities and Canadian players playing in the NCAA. This was the first draft since 1981 to feature only seven rounds and the first in the modern era of CFL Drafts. The 1993 Draft was held in Calgary, Alberta at the Jubilee Auditorium.

== Round one ==
= CFL Division All-Star	= CFL All-Star	= Hall of Famer

Pick #	CFL team	Player	Position	School
1	BC Lions	Patrick Burke	DB	Fresno State
2	Saskatchewan Roughriders	Brad Elberg	RB	Queen's
3	Ottawa Rough Riders	Paul Yatkowski	DT	Tennessee-Knoxville
4	Edmonton Eskimos	Michael O'Shea	LB	Guelph
5	Winnipeg Blue Bombers	Alan Wetmore	LB	Acadia
6	Calgary Stampeders	Mark Pearce	DL	Cape Breton

== Round two ==
= CFL Division All-Star	= CFL All-Star	= Hall of Famer

Pick #	CFL team	Player	Position	School
7	BC Lions	Tom Europe	DB	Bishop's
8	Toronto Argonauts	Brian McCurdy	DB	Northern Arizona
9	Saskatchewan Roughriders	Brooks Findlay	LB	Portland State
10	Ottawa Rough Riders	Dwight Richards	TB	Weber State
11	Edmonton Eskimos	Brent Stucke	SB	Wilfrid Laurier
12	Hamilton Tiger-Cats	P.J. Martin	FB	Wilfrid Laurier
13	Winnipeg Blue Bombers	Dave McLaughlin	LB	British Columbia
14	Calgary Stampeders	Greg Frers	DB	Simon Fraser

== Round three ==
Pick #	CFL team	Player	Position	School
15	Saskatchewan Roughriders	Kevin Hickey	T	Ottawa
16	Toronto Argonauts	Jerrold Johnson	FB	Azusa Pacific
17	Saskatchewan Roughriders	Erroll Brown	DB	Saskatchewan
18	Ottawa Rough Riders	Nigel Levy	WR	Western Ontario
19	Edmonton Eskimos	Albert Frederick	LB	Livingston
20	Hamilton Tiger-Cats	Ara Ishkanian	DE	Cal State Fullerton
21	Calgary Stampeders	Dwayne Dmytryshyn	SB	Saskatchewan
22	Calgary Stampeders	Scott McNeil	OL	Boise State

== Round four ==
Pick #	CFL team	Player	Position	School
23	Hamilton Tiger-Cats	Frank Yeboah-Kodie	CB	Penn State
24	Toronto Argonauts	George Nimako	DB	Liberty
25	Saskatchewan Roughriders	Paul Cranmer	DB	Grand Valley State
26	Ottawa Rough Riders	Dean Noel	TB	Delaware State
27	Edmonton Eskimos	Scott McKenzie	K	Alberta
28	Hamilton Tiger-Cats	Gavin Palmer	LB	Boston U.
29	Hamilton Tiger-Cats	Sean Grayson	TE	Virginia Tech
30	Calgary Stampeders	Bruce Reid	TB	Simon Fraser

== Round five ==
Pick #	CFL team	Player	Position	School
31	BC Lions	Paul Pakulak	SB	Simon Fraser
32	Toronto Argonauts	Dean Stewart	TB	Mansfield
33	Saskatchewan Roughriders	Christian Daigle	DB	Bishop's
34	Ottawa Rough Riders	Jason Moller	OL	Queen's
35	Edmonton Eskimos	John Cutler	K	Alberta
36	Hamilton Tiger-Cats	Richard Fischer	DE	Toronto
37	Winnipeg Blue Bombers	Trevor Burke	DB	Saint Mary's
38	Calgary Stampeders	Mark Williams	DL	Houston

== Round six ==
Pick #	CFL team	Player	Position	School
39	BC Lions	Reinhart Keller	DL	Wilfrid Laurier
40	Toronto Argonauts	Frank Jagas	P/K	Western Ontario
41	Saskatchewan Roughriders	Kent Rowe	DE	Bishop's
42	Ottawa Rough Riders	Fred Marquette	OL	Concordia
43	Edmonton Eskimos	Mark Tolbert	SB	Alberta
44	Hamilton Tiger-Cats	Tony D'Agostino	TB	McMaster
45	Winnipeg Blue Bombers	Quinn Magnuson	OL	Washington State
46	Calgary Stampeders	Tom Sterkenburg	DB	Rocky Mountain College

== Round seven ==
Pick #	CFL team	Player	Position	School
47	BC Lions	Ted Gerela	LB	Rocky Mountain College
48	Toronto Argonauts	Gary Biskup	DB	Texas A&M
49	Saskatchewan Roughriders	Thane Watkins	C	Delaware State
50	Ottawa Rough Riders	James Monroe	C	Syracuse
51	Edmonton Eskimos	Jeff Benoit	TB	Mansfield
52	Hamilton Tiger-Cats	Eric Dell	DT	Queen's
53	Winnipeg Blue Bombers	Jayson Johnson	SB	Carleton
54	Calgary Stampeders	Mike Freiter	SB	Calgary
