= Dick Aldridge =

No. 31
- Positions: Linebacker, Running back

Personal information
- Born: January 19, 1941; Toronto, Ontario, Canada
- Died: June 26, 2004 (aged 63); Tottenham, Ontario, Canada
- Listed height: 6 ft 0 in (1.83 m)
- Listed weight: 198 lb (90 kg)

Career information
- College: Waterloo

Career history
- 1965–1973: Toronto Argonauts
- 1974: Hamilton Tiger-Cats

Richard Frederick Aldridge (January 19, 1941 – June 26, 2004) was a player in the Canadian Football League. Aldridge played linebacker and running back for the Toronto Argonauts and Hamilton Tiger-Cats from 1965 to 1974. He died of pancreatic cancer in 2004.

== College and CFL draft ==
A star football and basketball player at Runnymede Collegiate Institute in Toronto, Dick Aldridge attended the University of Waterloo from 1960 to 1965, where he captained the basketball and football teams and was a three-time OUAA all-star half back. Originally drafted by the B.C. Lions in the 1964 CFL draft, Aldridge was traded first to the Hamilton Tiger-Cats, and then, in the summer of 1965, to the Toronto Argonauts.

== Toronto ==
Dick Aldridge played nine seasons for the Toronto Argonauts from 1965 to 1973, playing in virtually every game from his rookie season onwards, for a total of 117 regular season and 6 playoff games. Although a running back at university, it was as a linebacker and kick returner that he established himself in the Argonauts' line-up under head coach Bob Shaw. Subsequent coaches Leo Cahill and John Rauch continued to use Aldridge as a linebacker, and the Argonauts' defensive unit of which he was a member in these years became renowned for its effectiveness and ferocity. His team-mate Peter Martin later described him as "a great athlete who was always very fit", who "trained a lot", devoted time to watching opponents on film, and "was a true student of the game". He recovered a career total of 11 fumbles (scoring one touchdown in 1968 after a 99-yard return) and made a career total of 18 interceptions (scoring one touchdown as a rookie in 1965) in Argonauts double-blue, including a team-leading 7 interceptions in 1970. The 1969 Argonauts' squad, disgruntled about being required to play four pre-season exhibition games without pay, held a meeting at Dick Aldridge's home, where they took advice from Alan Eagleson and decided to stage a walk-out. League rules at the time prohibited owner John W, H. Bassett from paying players to play in exhibition games, and the "strike" was resolved when he agreed to pay them $60 per week for the two weeks they spent in training camp. Dick Aldridge played in the 14–11 loss to the Calgary Stampeders in the 1971 Grey Cup game in Vancouver, made notorious in Canadian sporting history by Leon McQuay's slip and fumble seven yards from the Stampeders' endzone with fewer than two minutes left in the game.

== Hamilton ==
Dick Aldridge retired from the Argonauts prior to the 1974 season, after John Rauch changed the start-time for team practices from four o'clock to noon, which would have made it impossible for Aldridge to continue in his day job as a high school teacher. However, he was then contacted by Hamilton, whose practices were scheduled later in the day. He joined the Tiger-Cats for the 1974 season, playing in 10 games and making one interception, and helping the team to finish ahead of the Argonauts in the standings.

== York University ==
After retiring from the CFL at the end of the 1974 season, Dick Aldridge was appointed head football coach at York University. He coached the Yeomen from 1975 to 1977, after which he coached the junior-level Etobicoke Junior Argonauts for a couple of seasons.

== High school teacher and coach ==
In 1966, while playing for the Argonauts, Dick Aldridge began working as a teacher at his former high school, Runnymede Collegiate Institute. He moved to Westview Centennial Secondary School in 1968, and in 1975, his CFL playing career having ended, he moved to a new teaching position at Banting Memorial High School in Alliston, Ontario. He and his family settled in Tottenham, where they later purchased and ran the local Stedmans franchise. In addition to his teaching duties at Banting, Aldridge coached the senior boys' football and basketball teams.

== Honours ==
Dick Aldridge was inducted into the Waterloo Warriors Hall in 1985. He was elected to the OUAA Legends Hall-of-Fame. He became an active member of the University of Waterloo Alumni Association, serving on its executive board.

== Personal ==
Dick Aldridge married Elisabeth (Betty) Van Haastrecht in 1966 and had two children, Jodi and Rick. He died of pancreatic cancer on 26 June 2004 at his home in Tottenham. His cremated remains were interred at Mt. Tegart Cemetery in Tottenham. Following his death, Aldridge's family established and organized an annual charity golf tournament, the Dick Aldridge Charity Golf Classic, to raise funds for pancreatic cancer research. By its tenth anniversary in 2014, this event had raised over $750,000.
