= Bayne Norrie =

Retired Canadian football player (born 1944)

Profile
- Positions: Halfback, Defensive back

Personal information
- Born: June 30, 1944 (age 82); North Bay, Ontario, Canada
- Listed height: 5 ft 10 in (1.78 m)
- Listed weight: 190 lb (86 kg)

Career information
- University: Queen's

Career history
- 1968–1975: Edmonton Eskimos

Awards and highlights
- Grey Cup champion (1975)

Bayne Norrie (born June 30, 1944) is a retired Canadian football player who was drafted in the 1st round of the 1965 CFL Draft by the BC Lions. Bayne Norrie, played for the Edmonton Eskimos for 8 years and participated in three straight Grey Cups from 1973 to 1975 and won one Grey Cup with Edmonton in 1975. Bayne had an illustrious college football career at Queen's University and was inducted into the Queens University Sports and Football Hall of Fame in 1983.

== Edmonton Eskimo Alumni Association ==
The following career activity is provided in relation to Norrie's EE Alumni nomination for CFLAA Lifetime Achievement Award. The information is limited to the criteria established by the CFLAA in relation to assessing the respective candidate for this award.

== Queen’s University ==
Graduated from Queen's with undergraduate degrees in math and physical education and a master's degree in business. Started at running back (4 years) and rover-defensive back (2 years) during a 6-year football career at Queen's. Team captain in 1967 and MVP in 1966 and 1967 as rover back. Inducted in the Queen's Football Hall of Fame among the first group of inductees, at the inaugural induction, in 1983, the year the Queen's Football Hall of Fame was established. At that time, Norrie was joined by six members of the 1920s Queens Grey Cup Team and Ron Stewart and Jim Young.

== Edmonton Eskimo Alumni Association ==
Norrie and Ed Molstad started the Edmonton Eskimo Alumni Association, an Alberta Registered Society, in 1988. Norrie and Molstad invited former Eskimos Ian MacLeod, Rollie Miles, John Farlinger and Frank Morris to form the initial board of directors; and, at that first board of directors meeting Norrie was elected as the founding president of the association. Norrie served his two-year term as president and has been a director of the association since inception. For the last 15 years, Norrie has served as treasurer of the association.

- EE Alumni Charity Golf Tournament. Norrie has served on the Golf Committee for over 25 years and was chairman of the event for 15 of those years. During the 25 years, the tournament has raised over $500,000 to fund the association's charitable donation programs.
- EE Alumni Wine Fest. In 1994, Norrie started the EE Alumni Charity Wine Fest, which, under his direction, has grown into A 600-person event which in 2010 raised $15,000 that will be added to the Edmonton Eskimo Alumni Community Fund. Over the years, this event has raised in excess of $100,000 for the association's Community Fund.
- EE Alumni Casino. Norrie has been significantly involved in the 10 casinos that the alumni has conducted since 1997. Those casino events have resulted in: donations of $350,000 toward Community Projects; and, the establishment of the association's $238,000 Scholarship Foundation.
- The Igloo Room. Since its construction in 2002, Norrie has supervised the Game Day operation of the Association's Room at Commonwealth Stadium. Game Day operations have consistently covered the association's annual expenses relating to the Room.
- Treasurer. Norrie prepares monthly and annual financial statements for the directors of the association; and, assists with the reporting requirements of the association.
- James Bell Foundation. Norrie was one of the original organizers and served as a director and trustee of this foundation, which was established to assist James Bell, an Eskimo defensive back who suffered a serious spinal injury in a CFL game. In addition to assisting James, the foundation provided financial support to several other Edmonton athletes who suffered spinal cord injuries. One of the athletes assisted by the foundation ended up as paraplegic and credits the foundation and the EE Alumni with enabling him to obtain a law degree and a career as a Crown Prosecutor in Edmonton.
- Volunteer. Norrie represents the EE Alumni annually at numerous charity fundraising events.

== The League And Players' Association ==
- Player representative. In his rookie year, Norrie was elected as an Edmonton Eskimo Player rep and served in that capacity until 1975.
- CFL Pension Advisory Board. From 1971 to 1974, Norrie was the Players’ Association representative to the CFL pension plan advisory board.
- CFLPA Auditor. In 1974, Norrie was appointed as internal auditor of the Association; and, served in that capacity for one year.
- CFL Pension Plan. In 1992, Norrie was asked by the Players’ Association to return as a member of the pension advisory board; and, was appointed by the advisory board to the position of secretary. In 1998, when the Pension Board of Trustees was established, The PA again appointed Norrie as one of the 6 trustees to manage the Plan. Norrie continues to serve the league and players as secretary to the board of trustees of the pension plan. The day-to-day issues relating to the plan is handled by Norrie and Fred James (chairman).

== Edmonton Eskimos ==
Norrie joined the Eskimos, as a rookie, in 1968 and was the starting corner back for the last 12 games of the 14-game season. In 1969, he was moved to the starting left defensive halfback position. In 1970, he was asked to play as a starting wide receiver. He returned to left halfback in 1971; and, in 1972 was the Eskimo's nominee for Canadian Player of the year. Played in the 1973 All-Star Game. In the 1975 Grey Cup, due to an injury to Roy Bell (the Starting Running Back), played Running Back in the Eskimo's Cup Winning victory. Throughout his career, Norrie was called upon to return punts, return kickoffs and to punt on one occasion. He holds the Eskimo record of 299 Punts Returned without blocking. Terry Jones of the Edmonton Sun in an article relating to an early 1970s Eskimo game commented that Norrie was on the team depth chart in 13 places. Norrie, having already been established in the Edmonton business community, retired at training camp in 1976.

== Business and community ==
Norrie has been involved in Edmonton's business community since his arrival in 1968. After doing his Article period with Winspear Higgins Chartered Accountants, Norrie moved on to the following business career in Edmonton:

- Weber Bros Realty. Norrie served as controller from 1973 until 1975.
- Weber Real Estate. Norrie served as a director and executive vice president of this company, which provided real estate brokerage, appraisal, property management, land development, and mortgage brokerage services, from 1976 to 1982.
- Weber & Associates. Director and treasurer of this mortgage brokerage company from 1977 to 1982.
- Webmor Financial Services. Director and treasurer of this mortgage lending company from 1977 to 1982.
- W32 Corporation. Director and treasurer of this land development company from 1977 until 1982.
- WWW Developments. Director, treasurer and managing director of this industrial land developer from 1975 until 1985.
- Weber Motors. Served as a director of this Mercedes, Nissan dealership from 1976 until 1979.
- Delwood Homes. Served as a director of this home builder from 1976 until 1979.
- Yorkshire Trust Company. Served as Prairie Vice President of this full-service trust company from 1983 to 1987.
- Points of Call Airlines. As executive vice president and director prepared a feasibility study and business plan and led a public offering to raise the financing required to start operations of this public company that conducted holiday charter flights. Served Points of Call from 1987 to 1989.
- Points of Call Holidays. Served as president and a director of this charter holiday company from 1987 until 1989.
- Invicta Valve Manufacturing Inc. Raised the financing by private placement to start this manufacturing company. Has served as CEO, director and general manager since 1989.
- Chamber of Commerce. Served on committees of the Edmonton Chamber of Commerce.
- Additional community service. Outside of the substantial hours he has spent on CFLPA Business and EE Alumni Charity Fundraising, Norrie has, throughout his careers, given freely of his time to attend hundreds of Northern Alberta charity fundraisers and speaking engagements on behalf of the alumni and the Eskimo Football Club.

== CFL Alumni Association ==
Norrie had the opportunity to participate in an early conference call relating to the organization of a national alumni association for former CFL players. He remains a strong supporter of the objectives of the CFLAA; and, remains convinced that, even if The CFLAA is just going to be a communication medium, it can be extremely valuable to former players, to the league and to the CFL Players’ pension plan.
