= Jim Hughes (Canadian football) =

Canadian football player (born 1934)

Profile
- Positions: Centre, Tackle

Personal information
- Born: August 31, 1934
- Died: November 3, 2004 (aged 70)
- Listed height: 6 ft 4 in (1.93 m)
- Listed weight: 220 lb (100 kg)

Career history
- 1957–1958: Hamilton Tiger-Cats

Awards and highlights
- Grey Cup champion (1957)

James Grant "Jim" Hughes (August 31, 1934 – November 3, 2004) is a former Canadian football player who played for the Hamilton Tiger-Cats. He won the Grey Cup with them in 1957. He played college football at San Jose State University and was selected in the 1956 NFL draft by the Cleveland Browns.
