= 2000 Calgary Stampeders season =

Canadian football team season

- Owner: Sig Gutsche
- General manager: Wally Buono
- Head coach: Wally Buono
- Home stadium: McMahon Stadium

Results
- Record: 12–5–1
- Division place: 1st, West
- Playoffs: Lost West Final

Uniform

The 2000 Calgary Stampeders season was the 44th season for the team in the Canadian Football League (CFL) and their 63rd overall. The Stampeders finished in first place in the West Division with a 12–5–1 record. They appeared in the West Final but lost to the BC Lions.

== Preseason ==
Week	Date	Opponent	Score	Result	Record
A	June 21	vs. Saskatchewan Roughriders	28–14	Win	1–0
B	June 27	at BC Lions	32–20	Win	2–0

== Regular season ==
=== Season standings ===
West Division
Pos	Team	Pld	W	L	T	OTL	PF	PA	PD	Pts
1	Calgary Stampeders (C, Q)	18	12	5	1	0	604	495	+109	25
2	Edmonton Eskimos (Q)	18	10	7	0	1	527	520	+7	21
3	BC Lions (Q)	18	8	9	0	1	513	529	−16	17
4	Saskatchewan Roughriders	18	5	12	1	0	516	626	−110	11

Source: "CFL.ca". Archived from the original on 2009-06-29.
(C) First round bye; (Q) Qualified for playoffs

=== Season schedule ===
Week	Date	Opponent	Score	Result	Attendance	Record	Streak
1	July 5	vs. Edmonton Eskimos	44–22	Win	34,383	1–0	W1
2	July 14	at Winnipeg Blue Bombers	42–38	Win	24,571	2–0	W2
3	July 20	vs. BC Lions	35–2	Win	34,081	3–0	W3
4	July 28	at Saskatchewan Roughriders	52–52	Tie	25,061	3–0–1	T1
5	August 4	vs. Toronto Argonauts	37–17	Win	33,783	4–0–1	W1
6	August 10	at BC Lions	47–26	Win	20,103	5–0–1	W2
7	August 16	vs. Winnipeg Blue Bombers	37–16	Win	35,494	6–0–1	W3
8	August 25	at Montreal Alouettes	48–13	Loss	19,461	6–1–1	L1
9	September 4	vs. Edmonton Eskimos	30–18	Loss	35,967	6–2–1	L2
10	September 8	at Edmonton Eskimos	31–10	Loss	53,248	6–3–1	L3
11	September 16	vs. Hamilton Tiger-Cats	41–38	Win	35,187	7–3–1	W1
12	September 22	at Saskatchewan Roughriders	40–17	Win	27,141	8–3–1	W2
13	September 28	at Toronto Argonauts	31–14	Win	11,343	9–3–1	W3
14	October 6	vs. Saskatchewan Roughriders	28–18	Win	35,967	10–3–1	W4
15	October 15	at Edmonton Eskimos	33–30	Loss	34,318	10–4–1	L1
16	October 22	vs. BC Lions	45–38	Win	33,890	11–4–1	W1
17	October 29	vs. Montreal Alouettes	32–31	Win	45,010	12–4–1	W2
18	November 5	at Hamilton Tiger-Cats	24–22	Loss	20,795	12–5–1	L1

== Playoffs ==
=== West Final ===
Game	Date	Opponent	Score	Result
West Final	November 19	vs. BC Lions	37–23	Loss

== Roster ==
2000 Calgary Stampeders final roster
Quarterbacks: 15 Dave Dickenson; 19 Ben Sankey; Running backs: 32 Kelvin Anderson; 34 Duane Forde; 35 Scott Regimbald; Receivers: 82 Andre Arlain; 89 Marc Boerigter; 87 Aubrey Cummings; 88 Vince Danielsen; 83 Travis Moore; 18 Allen Pitts; 36 Ibrahim Tounkara	Offensive linemen: 68 Freddie Childress G; 67 Jamie Crysdale C; 54 David Heasman T; 50 Jay McNeil G; 64 Jeff Pilon G/T; 58 Tom Rayam T; Defensive linemen: 76 Joe Fleming DT; 84 Ray Jacobs DE; 56 Shonte Peoples DE; 93 Marc Pilon DT; 94 Jeff Traversy DT; Special teams: 11 Tony Martino P; 13 Mark McLoughlin K	Linebackers: 33 Ray Biggs; 96 Jason Clemett; 4 Darryl Hall; 51 Alondra Johnson; 44 Kevin Johnson; 41 Kent Ring; Defensive backs: 17 Marvin Coleman; 29 Eddie Davis; 12 Greg Frers; 9 Aldi Henry; 3 Jackie Kellogg; 37 Anthony Prior; 28 LaFann Williams	Injured list: 23 Yudonn Biassou DB; 2 Marcus Bradley DB; 14 Rock Preston RB; 59 Rocco Romano T; 27 Eric Sutton DB; -- Nelson Van Waes DT; Italics indicate International player

== Awards and records ==
=== 2000 CFL All-Stars ===
- QB – Dave Dickenson
- WR – Travis Moore
- DT – Joe Fleming
- DE – Shonte Peoples
- LB – Alondra Johnson
- CB – Marvin Coleman
- DB – Eddie Davis
- DS – Greg Frers
