= Allen Pitts =

American gridiron football player (born 1964)

No. 18
- Position: Wide receiver

Personal information
- Born: June 28, 1964 (age 62); Tucson, Arizona, U.S.
- Listed height: 6 ft 4 in (1.93 m)
- Listed weight: 200 lb (91 kg)

Career information
- College: California State, Fullerton
- NFL draft: 1986: undrafted

Career history
- 1986–1987: Los Angeles Rams*
- 1990–2000: Calgary Stampeders
- * Offseason or practice squad member only

Awards and highlights
- 2× Grey Cup champion (1992, 1998); 6× CFL All-Star (1991, 1992, 1994, 1995, 1998, 1999); 7× CFL West All-Star (1991, 1992, 1994, 1995 (CFL North), 1996, 1998, 1999); Jeff Nicklin Memorial Trophy (1999)
- Canadian Football Hall of Fame (Class of 2006)

Allen Pitts (born June 28, 1964) is an American former professional football wide receiver who played for the Calgary Stampeders of the Canadian Football League (CFL) from 1990 to 2000. He attended Cal-State Fullerton and played his entire professional career as a receiver for the Calgary Stampeders. He retired as the CFL's all-time leading receiver in term of career yardage until he was passed by Milt Stegall in 2008.

== College career ==
Pitts played receiver for the Cal State Fullerton Titans. He completed his eligibility with the Titans in 1985. One of his teammates in college was future CFL quarterback, Damon Allen.

== Professional career ==
=== NFL ===
Pitts had drawn the attention of NFL scouts, and believed he would be selected in the 1986 draft. However, in one pre-draft workout, Pitts was running a pass route, and college teammate Mark Collins stepped on his foot, breaking his fibula. Word of Pitts’ injury spread through the NFL grapevine and he was bypassed on draft day.

He was given a free-agent tryout with the Los Angeles Rams in the summer of 1986, but was cut during training camp. He was cut by the Rams during training camp in 1987 as well.

=== CFL ===
By April 1990, Pitts had been away from football for a few years. He decided to go to an open tryout camp at UC Irvine put on by Calgary Stampeders player personnel director, Roy Shivers.

Pitts was signed by the Calgary Stampeders for the 1990 season. Calgary finished first place in the West Division for the first time since 1971. Pitts contributed by leading the team in receiving yards (1,172), which placed him fifth in the league.

In 1991, Pitts was Calgary's nominee for the CFL Most Outstanding Player award for the first time. That year, he set a CFL record for most receptions in a season (118), led the CFL in yards (1,764), and tied for the league lead in touchdowns (15). Calgary went to its first Grey Cup since 1971, with Pitts playing in his first, and scoring a touchdown in the game. Calgary lost to Toronto 36-21.

In 1992, Calgary won its first Grey Cup since 1971, and Pitts won his first. Pitts' contributions to the team that year included: leading the CFL in receptions (103), yards (1,591), and scoring 13 touchdowns. He also scored a touchdown in the Grey Cup game. Pitts became the second CFL player to have more than one season with at least 100 receptions, and the first player to do so in consecutive seasons.

In 1993, Pitts accumulated 45 receptions for 776 yards and 4 scores in the first 7 games. However, he sustained a knee injury that required surgery and ended his season.

He had a monster year in 1994 setting several single season CFL records: receptions (126), receiving yards (2,036), receiving touchdowns (21), and total touchdowns (21), and tied Hal Patterson, Joey Walters, and Terry Greer for 100 yard receiving games (11). That year, he won the Calgary Stampeders' President's Ring for the first time.

The power of the Stampeders' passing attack was proved in 1995 despite star quarterback Doug Flutie missing significant time with injury. The rise of quarterback Jeff Garcia helped Pitts and Dave Sapunjis combine for over 3,000 yards receiving. Pitts gained 100 catches for 1,492 yards and 11 touchdowns. Remarkably, these numbers were second on the team to Sapunjis' 111-1653-12. This marked the first time a CFL team had two receivers with 100 or more receptions in the same season. Calgary played Baltimore in the Grey Cup. Baltimore defeated Calgary 37-20 to become the first American-based team to win the Grey Cup.

In 1996, Pitts was Calgary's nominee for the CFL Most Outstanding Player award for the second time. He led the Stampeders in receptions (86) and yards (1,309), and tied for the league lead in touchdowns (11).

Pitts missed the first seven games of the 1997 season because of a broken hand. In the 11 games he did play, he accumulated 885 yards and 9 touchdowns receiving. He also had 113 yards and 1 touchdown in Calgary's loss in the West Semi-Final.

In 1998, Pitts led the West Division in receptions (96) and yards (1,372), and led the CFL in touchdowns (11). In Calgary's West Final win, he had 125 yards and 1 touchdown. Calgary went to the Grey Cup against the Hamilton Tiger-Cats and won 26-24. This was Pitts' second Grey Cup win.

In 1999, Pitts led the CFL in receptions (97) and yards (1,449), and finished second in the league with 10 touchdowns. He won the Jeff Nicklin Memorial Trophy as the Most Outstanding Player in the West Division. He was the runner-up for the CFL Most Outstanding Player award to Danny McManus. Calgary went back to the Grey Cup, and Pitts had a receiving touchdown in the game, but the team lost to McManus' Tiger-Cats 32-21. Pitts won the Calgary Stampeders' President's Ring for the second time.

In 2000, at age 36, Pitts accumulated a very respectable 77 catches for 1,045 yards and six scores.

On February 20, 2001, the Stampeders announced that they had released Pitts. Pitts played his entire 11-year career with one team, and under a single head coach, Wally Buono. During Pitts' tenure in Calgary, the team had a winning record and made the playoffs every year.

Upon completion of his career, Pitts ranked in the top 3 all-time in the following career categories:

- #1 in receptions (966)
- #1 in 100 reception seasons (4)
- #1 in playoff receptions (78)
- #3 in Grey Cup receptions (25)
- #1 in receiving yards (14,891)
- #1 in 100 yard receiving games (64)
- #1 in 1,000 yard receiving seasons (9)
- #1 in playoff receiving yards (1,290)
- #1 in receiving touchdowns (117) - he was the first CFL player to reach 100 receiving touchdowns
- #1 in games with receiving touchdowns (95)
- #3 in yards from scrimmage (14,886)
- #2 in total touchdowns (117)

In 2004, Pitts was inducted into the Stampeders' Wall of Fame, and his jersey number 18 was retired by the team. He was elected into the Canadian Football Hall of Fame in 2006. In November, 2006, Pitts was voted one of the CFL's Top 50 players (#10) of the league's modern era by Canadian sports network The Sports Network/TSN.

== CFL statistics ==
=== Regular season ===
Receiving		Regular season
Year	Team	Games	No.	Yards	Avg	Long	TD
1990	CGY	18	65	1172	18.0	67	6
1991	CGY	18	118	1764	14.9	87	15
1992	CGY	18	103	1591	15.4	53	13
1993	CGY	7	45	776	17.2	37	4
1994	CGY	18	126	2036	16.2	54	21
1995	CGY	16	100	1492	14.9	63	11
1996	CGY	17	86	1309	15.2	41	11
1997	CGY	11	53	885	16.7	43	9
1998	CGY	18	97	1449	14.9	63	10
1999	CGY	17	96	1372	14.3	62	11
2000	CGY	18	77	1045	13.6	29	6
CFL totals		176	966	14,891	15.4	87	117

=== Playoffs ===
Year & game	Team	GP	REC	YD	TD
1990 West Final	CGY	1	5	93	1
1991 West Semi-Final	CGY	1	6	173	2
1991 West Final	CGY	1	7	72	0
1992 West Final	CGY	1	5	91	0
1993 West Semi-Final	CGY	0	-	-	-
1993 West Final	CGY	0	-	-	-
1994 West Semi-Final	CGY	1	12	183	1
1994 West Final	CGY	1	4	58	0
1995 North Semi-Final	CGY	1	3	60	0
1995 North Final	CGY	1	3	22	0
1996 West Final	CGY	1	2	26	0
1997 West Semi-Final	CGY	1	7	113	1
1998 West Final	CGY	1	8	125	1
1999 West Semi-Final	CGY	1	4	49	0
1999 West Final	CGY	1	9	173	1
2000 West Final	CGY	1	3	52	0
Totals		14	78	1,290	7

=== Grey Cup ===
Year	Team	GP	REC	YD	TD
1991	CGY	1	4	66	1
1992	CGY	1	7	75	1
1995	CGY	1	3	54	0
1998	CGY	1	5	74	0
1999	CGY	1	6	95	1
Totals		5	25	364	3
