= Commissioner's Award =

The Commissioner's Award is presented annually by the Commissioner of the Canadian Football League to an individual or individuals who have demonstrated dedication and made a significant contribution to Canadian Football. The award was first introduced in the 1990 CFL season.

== Award winners ==
- 2025 – Wade Miller, President and CEO Winnipeg Blue Bombers
- 2024 – Amar Doman, Owner BC Lions
- 2023 – Bob Young, Owner Hamilton Tiger Cats
- 2022 – Jeff Harbin, CFL Manager, Officiating, long time on-field official, replay official, Rules Committee member, Rule Book editor.
- 2021 – Nurse Sara May, Hamilton-area nurse in honour of her work during COVID-19 pandemic.
- 2019 – Jim Lawson, chairman of the CFL's Board of Governors
- 2018 – Pierre Vercheval
- 2017 – Rick Sowieta, former Ottawa Rough Rider
- 2016 – Jason Colero – Toronto Argonauts Director of Education & Community Programs
- 2015 – Bernie Custis, CFL's first Black Quarterback
- 2014 – Ottawa Redblack ownership group
- 2013 – Dwayne Mandrusiak, Edmonton Eskimos Equipment Manager
- 2012 – Every CFL player all-time (accepted by CFLPA president Mike Morreale)
- 2011 – Larry Reda, BC Amateur Football
- 2010 – Ridernation, All the fans of Saskatchewan Roughriders
- 2009 – Wally Buono, Calgary Stampeders and BC Lions GM and Coach
- 2008 – Ron Lancaster, Outstanding career with several CFL teams as player, Coach, CBC broadcaster
- 2007 – Keith Pelley, Toronto Argonauts
- 2006 – Winnipeg Blue Bombers Ghosts, accepted by team board member Gene Dunn
- 2005 – The Waterboys
- 2004 – Russ Jackson, Ottawa Rough Riders Hall of Fame Quarterback
- 2003 – TSN, Toronto
- 2002 – Hugh Campbell, Long time Edmonton Eskimos Coach/GM/CEO & President
- 2001 – Robert Wetenhall and Larry Smith, Montreal Alouettes owners
- 2000 – Jeff Giles, Toronto Argonauts
- 1999 – none
- 1998 – Fausto Belluomini, Jim Hunt, Toronto writer, radio broadcaster, and Jim Proudfoot
- 1997 – Pat Bowlen and Jack Agrios
- 1996 – John Tory, Toronto Argonauts
- 1995 – Don Wittman, CBC Broadcaster
- 1994 – Norm Fieldgate, British Columbia Lions
- 1993 – Reg Wheeler, Hamilton Wildcats, helped build Canadian Football Hall of Fame
- 1992 – Tom Shepherd, Saskatchewan Roughriders
- 1991 – Jack Matheson, Winnipeg Tribune sports writer
- 1990 – Greg B. Fulton, played for Calgary, he developed play-by-play summaries and record stats for the CFL, & member of CFL rules committee.
