= Shonte Peoples =

American gridiron football player (born 1972)

No. 58
- Positions: Linebacker, Defensive end

Personal information
- Born: August 30, 1972 (age 54); Saginaw, Michigan, U.S.

Career information
- College: Michigan

Career history
- 1994: Las Vegas Posse
- 1995: Birmingham Barracudas
- 1996: Saskatchewan Roughriders
- 1997: Winnipeg Blue Bombers
- 1998: Chicago Bears
- 1998: Winnipeg Blue Bombers
- 1998–2000: Calgary Stampeders
- 2001–2003: Saskatchewan Roughriders

Awards and highlights
- James P. McCaffrey Trophy (1997); 3× CFL All-Star (1997, 2000, 2001); CFL East All-Star (1997); 2× CFL West All-Star (2000, 2001)

Shonte Peoples (born August 30, 1972) is a former linebacker in the Canadian Football League (CFL).

== College career ==
Peoples played as strong safety for University of Michigan football team in fall of 1990 to 1993.

== Professional career ==
In June 1994, Peoples signed with the Las Vegas Posse, an American CFL expansion franchise. He accumulated 14 sacks and 5 fumble recoveries. The Posse folded after the season.

In 1995, Peoples was selected second overall in 1995 CFL Dispersal Draft by another American CFL expansion franchise, the Birmingham Barracudas. He had 15 sacks and 2 fumble recoveries, one of which was for a touchdown. The Barracudas folded after the season.

In 1996, Peoples was selected in the third round, twenty-first overall in the 1996 CFL Dispersal Draft by the Saskatchewan Roughriders. He did not play any games that season because he had surgery to remove a non-cancerous tumor from his femur. He was not healed until there were three games left in the regular season, at which time he said it was too late in the season to play. The Roughriders suspended Peoples until his contract expired on February 15, 1997.

In 1997, Peoples signed with the Winnipeg Blue Bombers. He was reunited with Jeff Reinebold, Winnipeg's new head coach, who had been an assistant coach in Las Vegas in 1994. Peoples was a CFL East Division All-Star, CFL All-Star, and James P. McCaffrey Trophy winner as the outstanding defensive player in the East Division. He finished as the runner-up for the CFL's Most Outstanding Defensive Player to Willie Pless.

In 1998, Peoples signed with the Chicago Bears on February 18. He was released following training camp.

On September 18, 1998, he returned to the Blue Bombers, and played one game before being released on October 12.

On October 23, 1998, Peoples signed with the Calgary Stampeders. He played one regular season game, the West Final, and the 86th Grey Cup, his first Grey Cup win.

In 1999, Peoples missed the season due to immigration issues.

In 2000, Peoples played 18 regular season games and the West Final with the Stampeders. He led the Stampeders with 12 sacks and 3 fumble recoveries, and scored a 55 yard touchdown on his only interception return that season. Peoples was a West Division All-Star and a CFL All-Star. On February 16, 2001, he was granted free agency status.

In 2001, Peoples signed with the Saskatchewan Roughriders, his second stint with the team. He played all 18 regular season games, and accumulated 12 sacks, a league-high 6 forced fumbles, and 4 fumble recoveries. He was named a West Division All-Star for the second time in his career.

In 2002, Peoples played 14 regular season games for the Roughriders. He had 2 sacks in Saskatchewan's playoff loss to the Toronto Argonauts.

In 2003, Peoples played all 18 regular season games for the Roughriders and had 8 sacks. He also played in both of Saskatchewan's playoff games.

== Off-field issue ==
In March 1994 he fired a pistol at police he had mistaken for car thieves trying to steal his new Jeep. Four months later, a jury found him guilty on two felony charges of assault with a dangerous weapon.
