= Shannon Baker (gridiron football) =

American gridiron football player (born 1971)

No. 84
- Position: Wide receiver

Personal information
- Born: July 20, 1971 (age 55); Bartow, Florida, U.S.
- Listed height: 5 ft 9 in (1.75 m)
- Listed weight: 185 lb (84 kg)

Career information
- High school: Kathleen (Lakeland, Florida)
- College: Florida State
- NFL draft: 1993: 8th round, 205th overall pick

Career history
- Atlanta Falcons (1993)*; Indianapolis Colts (1993–1994); Jacksonville Jaguars (1995)*; Winnipeg Blue Bombers (1995–1996); New Orleans Saints (1997)*; Saskatchewan Roughriders (1997–1998)
- * Offseason or practice squad member only

Career NFL statistics
- Receptions: 2
- Receiving yards: 15
- Stats at Pro Football Reference

Career CFL statistics
- Receptions: 64
- Receiving yards: 713
- Receiving touchdowns: 1

Shannon Maurice Baker (born July 20, 1971) is an American former professional football player who was a wide receiver in the National Football League (NFL) for the Indianapolis Colts. He played college football for the Florida State Seminoles. He also played in the Canadian Football League (CFL) for the Winnipeg Blue Bombers and Saskatchewan Roughriders.

== Early life ==
Baker is from Lakeland, Florida. He initially attended Kathleen High School in Lakeland, where he threw for 1,243 yards and 12 touchdowns as a sophomore quarterback. Baker transferred to Lakeland High School as a junior and was converted to a wide receiver before switching back to quarterback ahead of his senior season in 1988. Aside from football, he was a starter on the basketball team and starred on the track and field team. As a junior in 1988, he won the state title in the 100 meter dash. Baker repeated the feat as a senior, also winning the 220 yard dash state title, and was named the Polk County Boys Track Athlete of the Year by The Tampa Tribune.

== College career ==
Baker accepted a scholarship to play football at Florida State University. As a sophomore, he caught a memorable touchdown on a Hail Mary pass as time expired in the first half of a win over LSU. Baker finished the season with 18 catches for 242 yards and four touchdowns.

Baker was featured in a more prominent role by his junior year, when he was named the starting flanker. He caught 25 passes in the first seven games of the season, finishing with 30 catches for 451 yards and four touchdowns. As a senior, Baker recorded 22 catches for 297 yards and three touchdowns. He also sprinted on the Seminoles track team.

== Professional career ==
Baker was selected by the Atlanta Falcons in the eighth round (205th overall) of the 1993 NFL draft. He was waived on August 30, 1993. Baker signed with the Indianapolis Colts on September 22. He recorded two catches for 15 yards in 1994 and was waived on September 27, 1994, subsequently spending three weeks on the practice squad. On December 15, he signed with the Jacksonville Jaguars as one of the first three players in franchise history. However, he was released on August 13, 1995. Baker signed with the Winnipeg Blue Bombers of the Canadian Football League (CFL) later that month. He suffered a separated shoulder in a game against the Calgary Stampeders, forcing him to miss the remainder of the 1995 season. At the time of his injury, Baker was leading the league with 24.4 yards per kick return. He also returned a punt for a touchdown. In 1996, Baker was knocked unconscious in a game against the Edmonton Eskimos. He played 17 games for the Blue Bombers over two seasons.

Baker signed a free agent deal with the New Orleans Saints in April 1997. He was waived that August before signing with the Saskatchewan Roughriders the following month. In the 85th Grey Cup, Baker returned the opening kickoff for 74 yards. He re-signed with Saskatchewan in May 1998. He made his first touchdown catch in a loss to the Montreal Alouettes on July 9 before he was released in September.
