= Mo Elewonibi =

Nigerian-Canadian gridiron football player (born 1965)

Mohammed Elewonibi
No. 64, 67, 65
- Position: Offensive tackle

Personal information
- Born: December 16, 1965 (age 60); Lagos, Nigeria
- Listed height: 6 ft 4 in (1.93 m)
- Listed weight: 286 lb (130 kg)

Career information
- High school: Victoria (Victoria, British Columbia, Canada)
- College: BYU
- NFL draft: 1990: 3rd round, 77th overall pick
- CFL draft: 1990: 5th round, 34th overall pick

Career history
- Washington Redskins (1990–1993); Buffalo Bills (1994)*; Barcelona Dragons (1995); Philadelphia Eagles (1995); BC Lions (1997–1999); Winnipeg Blue Bombers (2000–2004); BC Lions (2005)
- * Offseason or practice squad member only

Awards and highlights
- Super Bowl champion (XXVI); CFL All-Star (1998); Outland Trophy (1989); Consensus All-American (1989); First-team All-WAC (1989)

Career NFL statistics
- Games played: 26
- Games started: 19
- Fumble recoveries: 3
- Stats at Pro Football Reference

Mohammed Thomas David "Mo" Elewonibi (born December 16, 1965) is a Nigerian-Canadian former offensive lineman who played in the National Football League (NFL) and Canadian Football League (CFL). He was injured just prior to the end of the first half of the Eagles / Cowboys Divisional Playoff Game on January 7, 1996, and transported off the field on a stretcher with a knee injury. It was his final game in the NFL.

== Early life ==
Elewonibi was born in Lagos, Nigeria and raised in Victoria, British Columbia. He attended Victoria High School, where he excelled at soccer and basketball.

Elewonibi played two years for the Okanagan Sun football club, and was named to the 25 Year All Time Team announced in 2005 to celebrate 25th anniversary of the sun organization.

== College career ==
He began his college career at Snow College, in Ephraim, UT, where he first began to play football. He transferred to Brigham Young University to finish his college career. Mo won the Outland Trophy while at Brigham Young. The award is for the country's most outstanding lineman in college football. In 1986, during his freshman season at Snow College, Elewonibi was convinced by friends to join the football team despite never having played the game before. He quickly impressed the coaches and earned a starting role at guard. In 1987, his final year at Snow, he was named second-team all-America, along with all-conference and all-region honors. After transferring to BYU in the spring of that year, he played primarily as a backup in 1988, earning one start in a 42–7 win over Colorado State. In 1989, his only season as a full-time starter, he captured the Outland Trophy, was named a first-team All-American by Kodak and Walter Camp, and was a second-team All-American selection by The Sporting News. He also earned first-team All-WAC honors that season.

== Professional career ==
Elewonibi was selected by the Washington Redskins in the third round of the 1990 NFL Draft. BYU coaches reportedly told Redskins general manager Charley Casserly that he was one of the steals of the draft. Head coach Joe Gibbs praised Elewonibi’s athleticism and intelligence, noting that the team’s medical staff had cleared him despite concerns from other franchises about his surgically repaired shoulder. He had previously undergone major surgery in 1988, followed by four additional arthroscopic cleanup procedures.

== Personal ==
Elewonibi converted from Islam to the Church of Jesus Christ of Latter-day Saints during his second year of college. Elewonibi now lives on Vancouver Island and works as a counselor helping recovering addicts return to normal life.
