= Johnnie Harris (American football) =

American football player (born 1972)

No. 3, 37
- Position: Safety

Personal information
- Born: August 21, 1972 (age 54); Chicago, Illinois, U.S.
- Listed height: 6 ft 0 in (1.83 m)
- Listed weight: 210 lb (95 kg)

Career information
- High school: Martin Luther King (Chicago)
- College: Mississippi State
- NFL draft: 1995: undrafted

Career history
- San Antonio Texans (1995); Tampa Bay Storm (1996–1998); Toronto Argonauts (1996–1997); Oakland Raiders (1999–2001); New York Giants (2002–2003); Orlando Predators (2005); Grand Rapids Rampage (2006–2007); Philadelphia Soul (2007); Dallas Desperados (2008)

Awards and highlights
- 2× Grey Cup champion (1996, 1997); ArenaBowl champion (1996); CFL All Star (1997); First-team All-Arena (1998); AFL Defensive Player of the Year (1998)

Career NFL statistics
- Tackles: 110
- Sacks: 0.5
- Forced fumbles: 4
- Interceptions: 3
- Stats at Pro Football Reference

Career AFL statistics
- Tackles: 306
- Sacks: 1
- Pass Breakups: 85
- Forced fumbles: 9
- Interceptions: 35
- Stats at ArenaFan.com

Johnnie Harris (born August 21, 1972) is an American former professional football player who was a safety in the National Football League (NFL). He played college football for the Mississippi State Bulldogs. Harris played in the NFL for the Oakland Raiders (1999–2001) and the New York Giants (2000–2003). He also played in the Arena Football League (AFL) for the Tampa Bay Storm (1996–1998), Orlando Predators (2005), Grand Rapids Rampage (2006–2007), Philadelphia Soul (2007) and Dallas Desperados (2008).

Harris also played two seasons in the Canadian Football League (1996–1997) winning a Grey Cup championship both times. He played one with the San Antonio Texans (1995) and two with the Toronto Argonauts (1996–1997).

Harris was named the AFL Defensive Player of the Year and first-team All-Arena at defensive specialist in 1998 after he set single-season league records in interceptions (11) and passes defended (33) while playing for the Tampa Bay Storm. The Storm's quarterback, Jay Gruden, told his brother, Raiders head coach Jon Gruden, to take a look at Harris, leading to his start in the NFL with the Raiders.
