= Lester Smith (Canadian football) =

American gridiron football player (born 1970)

Profile
- Position: Safety

Personal information
- Born: August 16, 1970 (age 56); Concord, North Carolina, U.S.

Career information
- College: The Citadel

Career history
- 1994–1995: Baltimore Stallions
- 1996–1998: Toronto Argonauts
- 1999–2001: Montreal Alouettes

Awards and highlights
- 3× Grey Cup champion (1995, 1996, 1997); CFL All-Star (1997); 3× CFL East All-Star (1997, 1998, 2000); The Citadel Bulldogs Jersey No. 15 retired

Lester Smith (born August 16, 1970) is an American former football player who played eight years in the Canadian Football League (CFL).

Smith attended The Citadel. A star standout on defense and as a punt returner, Smith recorded eight interceptions and 430 tackles in four seasons at the school. His senior season in 1992 saw the program allow 14 points or less in ten of the 13 games that the team played that year (which saw the Bulldogs win their first Southern Conference title in 31 years) and he would be a consensus All-American that year. His jersey number (15) was later retired.

Smith played defensive back for the Baltimore Stallions, Toronto Argonauts and Montreal Alouettes from 1994-2001. He was a CFL All-Star in 1997 and won two Grey Cup Championships (1995 and 1996) with the Stallions and Argos. He played college football at The Citadel, The Military College of South Carolina, where he was a two-time All-American and had his #15 jersey retired.
