= Jackie Kellogg =

American gridiron football player (born 1971)

No. 3
- Position: Defensive back

Personal information
- Born: March 29, 1971 (age 55); Tacoma, Washington, U.S.
- Listed height: 6 ft 2 in (1.88 m)
- Listed weight: 205 lb (93 kg)

Career information
- High school: Lakewood (WA) Clover Park
- College: Eastern Washington
- NFL draft: 1994: undrafted

Career history
- San Francisco 49ers (1994–1995)*; Calgary Stampeders (1995); Frankfurt Galaxy (1995); Calgary Stampeders (1996–1997); Frankfurt Galaxy (1997); Tampa Bay Storm (1997); Calgary Stampeders (1998–2000); Edmonton Eskimos (2001); Calgary Stampeders (2001); Memphis Maniax (2001); Edmonton Eskimos (2002); Calgary Stampeders (2004)
- * Offseason or practice squad member only

Awards and highlights
- World Bowl champion '95; Grey Cup champion (1998); 2× CFL West Division All-Star (1998–1999)

Career CFL statistics
- Interceptions: 27
- Touchdowns: 6
- Sacks: 8
- Stats at ArenaFan.com

Jackie Kellogg (born March 29, 1971) is a former American and Canadian football defensive back in the Canadian Football League (CFL), World League of American Football (WLAF), Arena Football League (AFL) and XFL. He played college football at Eastern Washington.
