= Albert Johnson (gridiron football) =

American gridiron football player (born 1977)

Albert Johnson III
No. 87
- Positions: Wide receiver, Kick returner

Personal information
- Born: November 11, 1977 (age 48); Houston, Texas, U.S.
- Listed height: 5 ft 9 in (1.75 m)
- Listed weight: 180 lb (82 kg)

Career information
- College: Southern Methodist

Career history
- 1999: Saskatchewan Roughriders
- 2000: Winnipeg Blue Bombers
- 2001–2002: Miami Dolphins
- 2003: New York Jets
- 2003-2004: Houston Texans*
- 2004: Cologne Centurions
- 2006–2007: Winnipeg Blue Bombers
- * Offseason or practice squad member only

Awards and highlights
- John Agro Special Teams Award (2000); CFL's Most Outstanding Rookie Award (2000); Frank M. Gibson Trophy (2000); 2× CFL All-Star (2000, 2006); 2× CFL East All-Star (2000, 2006)
- Stats at Pro Football Reference
- Stats at CFL.ca (archive)

Albert Johnson III (born November 11, 1977) is an American former professional football player who played in the Canadian Football League (CFL) for the Winnipeg Blue Bombers. Johnson played his college football for Southern Methodist University and then signed with the Saskatchewan Roughriders where he played three games in 1999. Johnson then signed with the Blue Bombers and went on to win the league's Rookie of the Year Award in 2000 after leading the league in return yardage. He signed with the Texans but suffered injuries throughout his National Football League (NFL) stint. In 2006 Johnson returned to the Blue Bombers and once again led the CFL in return yardage and was second in combined yards to teammate Charles Roberts.

Johnson was released in January 2008 as the Bombers sought to reduce their payroll to meet the salary cap and was not picked up by any other team.
