= 1995 CFL dispersal draft =

After the Las Vegas Posse folded prior to the 1995 CFL season, a dispersal draft was held on 18 April 1995. 48 players were drafted among 13 teams over 5 rounds.

With the last pick in the draft, Ottawa drafted Darrell Robertson, who had been killed in a car crash the previous December.

== Round one ==
| Pick # | Player | Position | Team |
|---|---|---|---|
| 1 | Anthony Calvillo | QB | Hamilton Tiger Cats (via Memphis) |
| 2 | Shont'e Peoples | LB | Birmingham Barracudas |
| 3 | Curtis Mayfield | WR | Shreveport Pirates |
| 4 | Kalin Hall | RB | Hamilton Tiger Cats |
| 5 | Michael Stephens | WR | Ottawa Rough Riders |
| 6 | Maurice Kelly | CB | Toronto Argonauts |
| 7 | Jeff Sawyer | DE | San Antonio Texans |
| 8 | Prince Wimbley III | SB | Saskatchewan Roughriders |
| 9 | Darian Hagan | RB | Edmonton Eskimos |
| 10 | Tamarick Vanover | WR | Winnipeg Blue Bombers |
| 11 | Al Jordan | CB | Calgary Stampeders |
| 12 | Carlos Huerta | K | Baltimore Stallions |
| 13 | Ron Shipley | OL | BC Lions |

== Round two ==
| Pick # | Player | Position | Team |
|---|---|---|---|
| 14 | Steve Anderson | DE | Birmingham Barracudas |
| 15 | Don Robinson | DB | Hamilton Tiger Cats (via Memphis) |
| 16 | Ben Jefferson | OT | Shreveport Pirates |
| 17 | Calvin Nicholson | DB | Hamilton Tiger Cats |
| 18 | Eric Geter | DB | Ottawa Rough Riders |
| 19 | Bob Kronenberg | OL | Toronto Argonauts |
| 20 | Robert Clairborne | WR | San Antonio Texans |
| 21 | Tim Broady | LB | Saskatchewan Roughriders |
| 22 | Al Whiting | SB | Edmonton Eskimos |
| 23 | Leonard Johnson | DT | Winnipeg Blue Bombers |
| 24 | Jason Medlock | DE | Calgary Stampeders |
| 25 | James Bullock | CB | Baltimore Stallions |
| 26 | Mike Clark | DB | BC Lions |

== Round three ==
| Pick # | Player | Position | Team |
|---|---|---|---|
| 27 | David Maeva | DB | Memphis Mad Dogs |
| 28 | Roy Hart Jr. | DT | Birmingham Barracudas |
| 29 | Robbie Keen | K | Shreveport Pirates |
| 30 | Cedric Crawford | DB | Hamilton Tiger Cats |
| 31 | Alfie Burch | DB | Ottawa Rough Riders |
| 32 | Jeff Cummins | DT | Toronto Argonauts |
| 33 | Joe Garten | OL | San Antonio Texans |
| 34 | Zock Allen | LB | Saskatchewan Roughriders |
| 35 | Derrick Sheppard | WR | Edmonton Eskimos |
| 36 | Pass | | Winnipeg Blue Bombers |
| 37 | David Hollis | DB | Calgary Stampeders |
| 38 | Greg Tucker | LB | Baltimore Stallions |
| 39 | John Leach | RB | BC Lions |

== Round four ==
| Pick # | Player | Position | Team |
|---|---|---|---|
| 40 | Pass | OL | Birmingham Barracudas |
| 41 | Craig Gibson | OT | Memphis Mad Dogs |
| 42 | Brandon Houston | DE | Shreveport Pirates |
| 43 | Keith Embray | DL | Hamilton Tiger Cats |
| 44 | Norman Steele | DL | Ottawa Rough Riders |
| 45 | Pass | | Toronto Argonauts |
| 46 | James Richard | OL | San Antonio Texans |
| 47 | Lance Cook | DE | Saskatchewan Roughriders |
| 48 | Pass | | Edmonton Eskimos |
| 49 | Pass | | Winnipeg Blue Bombers |
| 50 | Pass | | Calgary Stampeders |
| 51 | Pass | | Baltimore Stallions |
| 52 | Lenny Gomes | DL | BC Lions |

== Round five ==
| Pick # | Player | Position | Team |
|---|---|---|---|
| 53 | Pass | | Memphis Mad Dogs |
| 54 | Hayward Haynes | OL | Birmingham Barracudas |
| 55 | Pass | | Shreveport Pirates |
| 56 | Jesse Becton | LB | Hamilton Tiger Cats |
| 57 | Darrell Robertson | DE | Ottawa Rough Riders |
| 58 | Pass | | Toronto Argonauts |
| 59 | Pass | | San Antonio Texans |
| 60 | Pass | | Saskatchewan Roughriders |
| 61 | Pass | | Edmonton Eskimos |
| 62 | Pass | | Winnipeg Blue Bombers |
| 63 | Pass | | Calgary Stampeders |
| 64 | Pass | | Baltimore Stallions |
| 65 | Pass | | BC Lions |
