= Tony Martino (Canadian football) =

Canadian gridiron football player (born 1966)

No. 11
- Position: Punter

Personal information
- Born: June 9, 1966 (age 60); Kelowna, British Columbia, Canada
- Listed height: 6.2 ft 199 in (6.94 m)

Career information
- College: Kent State
- CFL draft: 1988: 1st round, 7th overall pick

Career history
- 1988: Ottawa Rough Riders
- 1988–1990: BC Lions
- 1992–2000: Calgary Stampeders
- 2001: Toronto Argonauts
- 2001–2002: BC Lions

Awards and highlights
- 2× Grey Cup champion (1992, 1998); CFL All-Star (1998); 5× CFL West All-Star (1994, 1996, 1997, 1998, 2000)

Tony Martino (born June 9, 1966) is a former punter and placekicker from 1988–2002 for four Canadian Football League (CFL) teams. He was five times named as a league or division All-Star as a punter.
