= Carl Coulter =

Canadian football player (born 1966)

No. 51
- Positions: Centre, guard

Personal information
- Born: November 14, 1966 (age 60); Lindsay, Ontario, Canada

Career information
- University: Carleton
- CFL draft: 1990: 4th round, 26th overall pick
- Expansion draft: 2002: 3rd round

Career history
- 1990–1992: BC Lions
- 1993: Ottawa Rough Riders
- 1994–1995: Toronto Argonauts
- 1996: BC Lions
- 1997: Saskatchewan Roughriders
- 1998–2001: Hamilton Tiger-Cats
- 2002: Ottawa Renegades
- 2003–2004: Hamilton Tiger-Cats

Awards and highlights
- Grey Cup champion (1999); CFL All-Star (1998); 2× CFL East All-Star (1998, 1999)

Carl Coulter (born November 14, 1966) is a Canadian former professional football offensive lineman. He played 15 seasons in the Canadian Football League for six different teams. He was named CFL All-Star in 1998 and was a part of one Grey Cup championship team with the Hamilton Tiger-Cats in 1999. Coulter played CIS football for the Carleton Ravens. After a football career he moved on to teaching at elementary schools and doing construction work in Ottawa.
