= Mark McLoughlin =

English gridiron football player (born 1965)

No. 13
- Position: Kicker

Personal information
- Born: October 26, 1965 (age 61); Liverpool, England

Career information
- College: South Dakota
- CFL draft: 1988: 3rd round, 20th overall pick

Career history
- 1988–2003: Calgary Stampeders
- 2005: BC Lions

Awards and highlights
- 3× Grey Cup champion (1992, 1998, 2001); 6× Dave Dryburgh Memorial Trophy (1992, 1993, 1995, 1996, 1999, 2000); 2× Tom Pate Memorial Award (1995, 1997); 3× CFL All-Star (1994, 1996, 1999); 5× CFL West All-Star (1992, 1994, 1996, 1997, 1999)

Mark McLoughlin (born October 26, 1965) is a former placekicker in the Canadian Football League (CFL) for the Calgary Stampeders from 1988 to 2003 and the BC Lions in 2005. He won three Grey Cups for the Stampeders in 1992, 1998, and 2001, and was the second leading scorer in CFL history, behind only Lui Passaglia, at the time of his retirement. Seven times he scored over 200 points in a season with a career high of 220 in 1995 and tied that mark in 1996.

McLoughlin holds eight Western Division Scoring Crowns, is a five-time Western Division All-Star and also won the Northern Division All Star and three-time CFL All-Star. He is also a two-time recipient of the CFLPA's Tom Pate Memorial Award in 1995 and 1997 for his commitment on the football field and in the community.

== Affiliations ==
He also has a history of community involvement, having helped establish Stay-In-School initiatives in Calgary as well as a community partnership model to ensure equitable educational opportunities for students. Previously, he served as the partnership director for the Calgary Education Partnership Foundation, and has numerous other charitable involvements.

== Post-Football career ==
On September 2, 2003, McLoughlin retired to become team president of the Calgary Stampeders. He spent only 56 days in this position before he resigned to resume his playing career.

McLoughlin was the vice-president, pathways and corporate development in the pathways partnership between British Columbia-based credit union Envision Financial and Alberta-based credit union First Calgary Savings.

He was vice-president for advancement at Olds College in Olds, AB. He has since then become the deputy minister of advanced education at the Government of Saskatchewan, but resigned from that position in September 2022 to accept a role as the CEO of Kootenay Savings Credit Union in British Columbia.
