= Pierre Vercheval =

Canadian football player (born 1964)

No. 59
- Position: Guard

Personal information
- Born: November 22, 1964 (age 61); Rocourt, Belgium
- Listed height: 6 ft 1 in (1.85 m)
- Listed weight: 285 lb (129 kg)

Career information
- University: Western Ontario
- CFL draft: 1987: 2nd round, 17th overall pick

Career history
- 1988–1992: Edmonton Eskimos
- 1993–1997: Toronto Argonauts
- 1998–2001: Montreal Alouettes

Awards and highlights
- 2× Grey Cup champion (1996, 1997); CFL's Most Outstanding Offensive Lineman Award (2000); J. P. Metras Trophy (1987); 6× CFL All-Star (1992, 1994, 1997–2000); 5× CFL East All-Star (1994, 1997–2000); CFL West All-Star (1992)
- Canadian Football Hall of Fame (Class of 2007)

Pierre Vercheval (born November 22, 1964) is a former all star offensive lineman in the Canadian Football League.

Vercheval played his university football at the University of Western Ontario, where he won the J. P. Metras Trophy top lineman in Canadian university football in 1987. He tried out with the New England Patriots of the NFL, unsuccessfully, and signed with the Edmonton Eskimos in 1988, beginning a 14-year CFL career.

He played five seasons in Edmonton, then moved to the Toronto Argonauts for four seasons, from 1993 to 1997 (68 total games.) He was an all star three times and was part of the Argonauts powerful back-to-back Grey Cup winners of 1996 and 1997. He finished his career with the Montreal Alouettes, from 1998 to 2001 (78 games) being named an all star three more times and winning the CFL's Most Outstanding Offensive Lineman Award in 2000. In 2007, he became the first francophone to be inducted into the Canadian Football Hall of Fame.

Today, Vercheval works as a football commentator on the French-language RDS television station alongside Pierre Durivage (2002), Denis Casavant (2003–2013) and David Arsenault (since 2014).
