= Mustafah Muhammad =

American gridiron football player (born 1973)

No. 31
- Position: Defensive back

Personal information
- Born: October 19, 1973 (age 53); Los Angeles, California, U.S.
- Listed height: 5 ft 10 in (1.78 m)
- Listed weight: 180 lb (82 kg)

Career information
- College: Fresno State

Career history
- BC Lions (1998); Indianapolis Colts (1999–2000); Winnipeg Blue Bombers (2002)

Awards and highlights
- CFL's Most Outstanding Rookie Award (1998); Jackie Parker Trophy (1998)
- Stats at Pro Football Reference

Mustafah Jaleel Muhammad (born October 19, 1973, as Steve Wilson) is a former award-winning football player in the Canadian Football League, who later played in the National Football League, and was a high-profile criminal, being convicted of domestic battery.

== Playing career ==
Muhammad played his college football at several schools, including California State University, Fresno, Shasta Junior College and Chaffey Junior College. He took the CFL by storm in 1998, playing 17 games for the B.C. Lions and intercepting a league leading 10 passes. He was an all star and won the CFL's Most Outstanding Rookie Award. He played the next two seasons (1999 and 2000) with the Indianapolis Colts of the NFL, where he played 24 games over two seasons, most notably intercepting one pass and returning it 40 yards for a touchdown. He resurfaced in 2002 with the Winnipeg Blue Bombers.

== Legal trouble ==
Muhammad's pregnant wife, Nichole, died on November 7, 1999, losing her baby. It became publicly known that Steve Muhammad had been arrested and charged with misdemeanor battery on his wife on October 28, 10 days before her death. Though cleared of any wrongdoing in her actual death, Muhammad was unable to refute testimony from his six-year-old stepson, and was convicted November 8, 2000, of one count of domestic battery for beating his pregnant wife. "I wanted to stop daddy from hurting my mommy," Eric testified. Judge Evan Goodman sentenced Muhammad to one year in jail, which he suspended, and to one year's probation. He also ordered Muhammad to undergo 12 weeks of domestic violence counselling and to perform 32 hours of community service.
