= Derrell Mitchell =

American gridiron football player (born 1971)

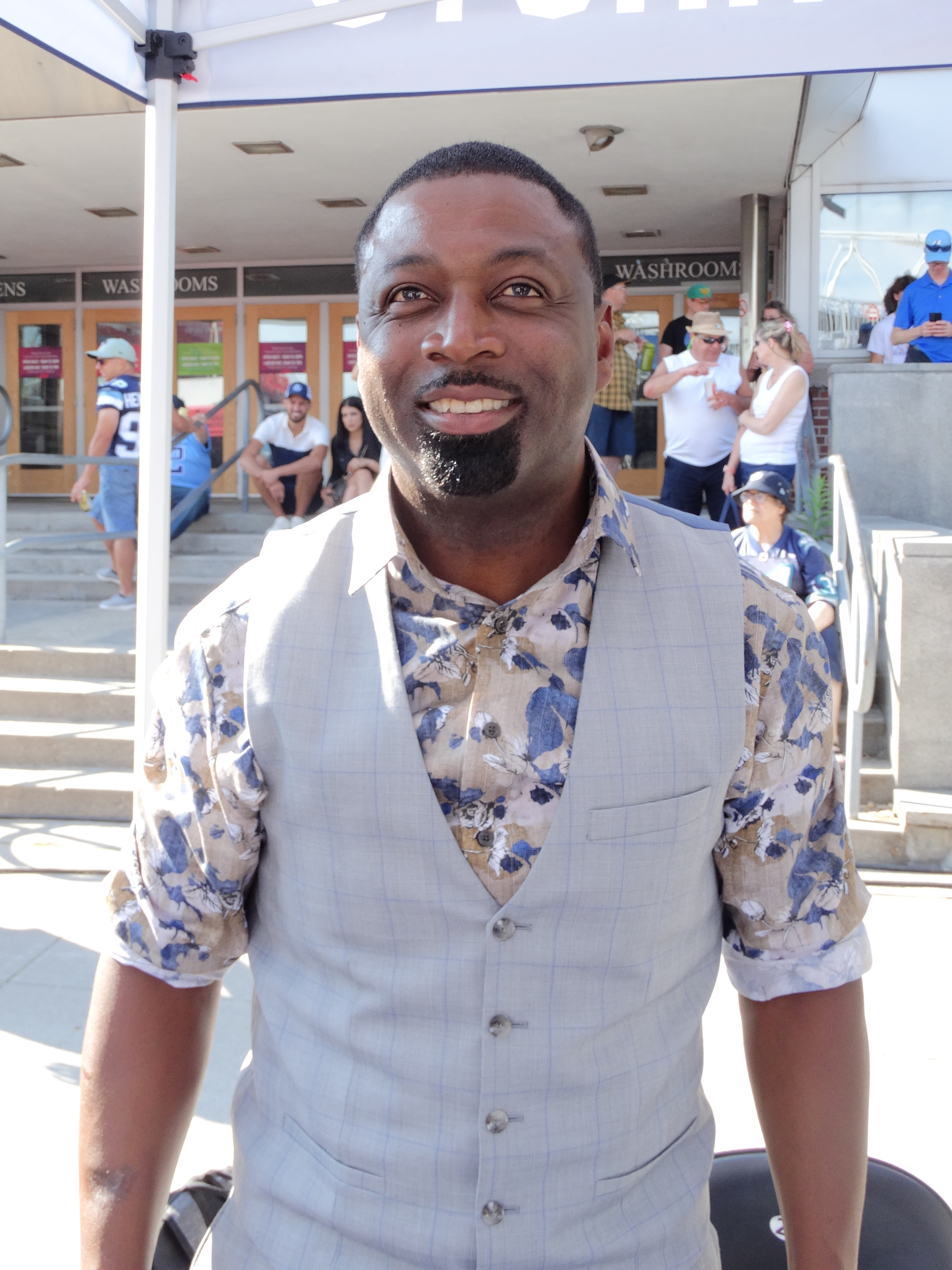
- Mitchell in 2023

Profile
- Position: Wide receiver

Personal information
- Born: September 16, 1971 (age 55); Miami, Florida, U.S.
- Listed height: 5 ft 9 in (1.75 m)
- Listed weight: 190 lb (86 kg)

Career information
- High school: Miami Northwestern (Miami, Florida)
- College: Texas Tech
- NFL draft: 1994: 6th round, 176th overall pick

Career history

Playing
- 1994: New Orleans Saints
- 1995: Scottish Claymores
- 1996: Atlanta Falcons*
- 1997–1998: Toronto Argonauts
- 1999: Chicago Bears*
- 1999–2003: Toronto Argonauts
- 2004–2006: Edmonton Eskimos
- 2007: Toronto Argonauts
- * Offseason or practice squad member only

Coaching
- 2011: Edmonton Eskimos (Receiver Assistant)
- 2012: Edmonton Eskimos (WR coach)

Awards and highlights
- 2× Grey Cup champion (1997, 2005); CFL's Most Outstanding Rookie Award (1997); Frank M. Gibson Trophy (1997); 3× CFL All-Star (1997, 1998, 2000); 5× CFL East All-Star (1997, 1998, 2000, 2001, 2002); Most pass receptions in a CFL season (160 in 1998)
- Stats at Pro Football Reference
- Stats at CFL.ca
- Canadian Football Hall of Fame (Class of 2016)

Derrell Lavoice "Mookie" Mitchell (born September 16, 1971) is a former Canadian Football League (CFL) slotback with the Toronto Argonauts and Edmonton Eskimos and former wide receivers coach for the Edmonton Eskimos.

== Junior college career ==
Mitchell attended Joliet Junior College. As a sophomore, he was an NJCAA second-team All-American pick, and was his league's co-Player of the Year.

== College career ==
After a stellar career at Joliet Junior College, Mitchell transferred to Texas Tech. He finished his two-year NCAA college football career with 91 receptions for 1312 yards (14.42 yards per rec. avg.) and 9 touchdowns.

== World League career ==
Mitchell spent the 1995 season with the Scottish Claymores of the World League of American Football, having been allocated there by the New Orleans Saints, catching 11 passes for 145 yards and one touchdown.

== CFL career ==
Mitchell signed with the Toronto Argonauts of the CFL in 1997 and immediately made a mark in the league with close to 1,500 yards and 17 TD's receiving in his first season in the league, going on to win the 1997 CFL's Most Outstanding Rookie Award. Days later, Mitchell and the Argonauts went on to win the Grey Cup in Edmonton, Alberta. In 1998, he took his game one step forward catching a CFL-record 160 receptions for 2,000 yards. After a failed tryout in the National Football League in 1999, Mitchell returned to the Argos and consistently put up 1,000-yard or close to 1,000-yard seasons.

In 2004, he was released by the Argonauts, and was promptly signed by the Edmonton Eskimos who he helped win the 2005 Grey Cup a season later. Mitchell was eventually released by Edmonton on June 23, 2007. On July 2, 2007, Mitchell rejoined the Argonauts by signing a practice agreement with the team. On July 11, 2007, he was put on the active roster in time for a game against the Calgary Stampeders the following day and scored a touchdown in his first game back with the Argonauts. On July 26, 2007, Mitchell set a new Argonaut record for career receiving yards after catching a pass from Damon Allen in a home game against the Montreal Alouettes, surpassing former record holder Paul Masotti's 8772 receiving yards. On October 27, 2007, Mitchell surpassed 12,000 career receiving yards in the CFL against the Winnipeg Blue Bombers.

He was released by the Argonauts on March 20, 2008.

On November 27, 2015, it was announced that Derrell "Mookie" Mitchell had been selected for enshrinement into the Canadian Football Hall of Fame with the Hall of Fame's Class of 2016.

== Coaching career ==
On January 20, 2012, it was announced that Mitchell had joined the Edmonton Eskimos' coaching staff as the team's wide receivers coach.
