= 1998 CFL season =

Canadian Football League season

- Duration: July 1 – November 1, 1998
- East champions: Hamilton Tiger-Cats
- West champions: Calgary Stampeders

86th Grey Cup
- Date: November 22, 1998
- Venue: Winnipeg Stadium, Winnipeg
- Champions: Calgary Stampeders

CFL seasons
- ← 1997 1999 →

Canadian Football League team locations: West, East

The 1998 CFL season is considered to be the 45th season in modern-day Canadian football, although it is officially the 41st Canadian Football League season.

== CFL news in 1998 ==
The Canadian Football League signed a five-year television contract with TSN. With the deal, TSN had the right to all CFL television broadcasts. The league also made a sponsorship deal with Adidas, which made them the official footwear, practice wear, and sport glove provider of the CFL.

For only the second time in history, the city of Winnipeg hosted the Grey Cup game.

== Regular season standings ==
West Division
Pos	Team	Pld	W	L	T	PF	PA	PD	Pts
1	Calgary Stampeders (C, Q)	18	12	6	0	558	397	+161	24
2	Edmonton Eskimos (Q)	18	9	9	0	396	450	−54	18
3	BC Lions (Q)	18	9	9	0	394	427	−33	18
4	Saskatchewan Roughriders	18	5	13	0	411	525	−114	10

Source: "1998 CFL regular season standings". Archived from the original on July 29, 2009.
(C) First round bye; (Q) Qualified for playoffs

East Division
Pos	Team	Pld	W	L	T	PF	PA	PD	Pts
1	Hamilton Tiger-Cats (C, Q)	18	12	5	1	503	351	+152	25
2	Montreal Alouettes (Q)	18	12	5	1	470	435	+35	25
3	Toronto Argonauts (Q)	18	9	9	0	452	410	+42	18
4	Winnipeg Blue Bombers	18	3	15	0	399	588	−189	6

Source: "1998 CFL regular season standings". Archived from the original on July 29, 2009.
(C) First round bye; (Q) Qualified for playoffs

Calgary and Hamilton both have first round byes.

== Grey Cup playoffs ==
The Calgary Stampeders are the 1998 Grey Cup Champions, defeating the Hamilton Tiger-Cats 26–24, at Winnipeg's Winnipeg Stadium on Mark McLoughlin's walk off field goal. The Stampeders have won their first championship since 1992. The Stampeders' Jeff Garcia (QB) was named the Grey Cup's Most Valuable Player and Vince Danielsen (SB) was the Grey Cup's Most Valuable Canadian.

=== Playoff bracket ===
November 8: Division Semifinals
East
E3	Toronto Argonauts	28
E2	Montreal Alouettes	41
West
W3	BC Lions	33
W2	Edmonton Eskimos	40

November 15: Division Finals
E2	Montreal Alouettes	20
E1	Hamilton Tiger-Cats	22
W2	Edmonton Eskimos	10
W1	Calgary Stampeders	33

November 22: 86th Grey Cup @ Winnipeg Stadium – Winnipeg, MB
E1	Hamilton Tiger-Cats	24
W1	Calgary Stampeders	26

== CFL leaders ==
- CFL passing leaders
- CFL rushing leaders
- CFL receiving leaders

== 1998 CFL All-Stars ==
=== Offence ===
- QB – Jeff Garcia, Calgary Stampeders
- RB – Kelvin Anderson, Calgary Stampeders
- RB – Mike Pringle, Montreal Alouettes
- SB – Derrell Mitchell, Toronto Argonauts
- SB – Allen Pitts, Calgary Stampeders
- WR – Donald Narcisse, Saskatchewan Roughriders
- WR – Terry Vaughn, Calgary Stampeders
- C – Carl Coulter, Hamilton Tiger-Cats
- OG – Fred Childress, Calgary Stampeders
- OG – Pierre Vercheval, Montreal Alouettes
- OT – Uzooma Okeke, Montreal Alouettes
- OT – Moe Elewonibi, BC Lions

=== Defence ===
- DT – Joe Fleming, Winnipeg Blue Bombers
- DT – Johnny Scott, BC Lions
- DE – Elfrid Payton, Montreal Alouettes
- DE – Joe Montford, Hamilton Tiger-Cats
- LB – Calvin Tiggle, Hamilton Tiger-Cats
- LB – Willie Pless, Edmonton Eskimos
- LB – Alondra Johnson, Calgary Stampeders
- CB – Eric Carter, Hamilton Tiger-Cats
- CB – Steve Muhammad, BC Lions
- DB – Gerald Vaughn, Hamilton Tiger-Cats
- DB – Orlondo Steinauer, Hamilton Tiger-Cats
- DS – Dale Joseph, BC Lions

=== Special teams ===
- P – Tony Martino, Calgary Stampeders
- K – Paul Osbaldiston, Hamilton Tiger-Cats
- ST – Eric Blount, Winnipeg Blue Bombers

== 1998 Western All-Stars ==
=== Offence ===
- QB – Jeff Garcia, Calgary Stampeders
- RB – Kelvin Anderson, Calgary Stampeders
- RB – Juan Johnson, BC Lions
- SB – Vince Danielsen, Calgary Stampeders
- SB – Allen Pitts, Calgary Stampeders
- WR – Donald Narcisse, Saskatchewan Roughriders
- WR – Terry Vaughn, Calgary Stampeders
- C – Jamie Crysdale, Calgary Stampeders
- OG – Fred Childress, Calgary Stampeders
- OG – Bruce Beaton, Edmonton Eskimos
- OT – John Terry, Saskatchewan Roughriders
- OT – Moe Elewonibi, BC Lions

=== Defence ===
- DT – Dave Chaytors, BC Lions
- DT – Johnny Scott, BC Lions
- DE – Leroy Blugh, Edmonton Eskimos
- DE – Malvin Hunter, Edmonton Eskimos
- LB – Darryl Hall, Calgary Stampeders
- LB – Willie Pless, Edmonton Eskimos
- LB – Alondra Johnson, Calgary Stampeders
- CB – Marvin Coleman, Calgary Stampeders
- CB – Steve Muhammad, BC Lions
- DB – Glenn Rogers Jr., BC Lions
- DB – Jack Kellogg, Calgary Stampeders
- DS – Dale Joseph, BC Lions

=== Special teams ===
- P – Tony Martino, Calgary Stampeders
- K – Lui Passaglia, BC Lions
- ST – Marvin Coleman, Calgary Stampeders

== 1998 Eastern All-Stars ==
=== Offence ===
- QB – Kerwin Bell, Toronto Argonauts
- RB – Ronald Williams, Hamilton Tiger-Cats
- RB – Mike Pringle, Montreal Alouettes
- SB – Derrell Mitchell, Toronto Argonauts
- SB – Darren Flutie, Hamilton Tiger-Cats
- WR – Paul Masotti, Toronto Argonauts
- WR – Andrew Grigg, Hamilton Tiger-Cats
- C – Carl Coulter, Hamilton Tiger-Cats
- OG – Val St. Germain, Hamilton Tiger-Cats
- OG – Pierre Vercheval, Montreal Alouettes
- OT – Uzooma Okeke, Montreal Alouettes
- OT – Chris Perez, Winnipeg Blue Bombers

=== Defence ===
- DT – Joe Fleming, Winnipeg Blue Bombers
- DT – Doug Petersen, Montreal Alouettes
- DE – Elfrid Payton, Montreal Alouettes
- DE – Joe Montford, Hamilton Tiger-Cats
- LB – Calvin Tiggle, Hamilton Tiger-Cats
- LB – Kelly Wiltshire, Toronto Argonauts
- LB – Grant Carter, Winnipeg Blue Bombers
- CB – Eric Carter, Hamilton Tiger-Cats
- CB – Donald Smith, Toronto Argonauts
- DB – Gerald Vaughn, Hamilton Tiger-Cats
- DB – Orlondo Steinauer, Hamilton Tiger-Cats
- DS – Lester Smith, Toronto Argonauts

=== Special teams ===
- P – Noel Prefontaine, Toronto Argonauts
- K – Paul Osbaldiston, Hamilton Tiger-Cats
- ST – Eric Blount, Winnipeg Blue Bombers

== 1998 Intergold CFLPA All-Stars ==
=== Offence ===
- QB – Jeff Garcia, Calgary Stampeders
- OT – John Terry, Saskatchewan Roughriders
- OT – Uzooma Okeke, Montreal Alouettes
- OG – Fred Childress, Calgary Stampeders
- OG – Jamie Taras, BC Lions
- C – Jamie Crysdale, Calgary Stampeders
- RB – Mike Pringle, Montreal Alouettes
- FB – Michael Soles, Montreal Alouettes
- SB – Derrell Mitchell, Toronto Argonauts
- SB – Darren Flutie, Hamilton Tiger-Cats
- WR – Donald Narcisse, Saskatchewan Roughriders
- WR – Terry Vaughn, Calgary Stampeders

=== Defence ===
- DE – Elfrid Payton, Montreal Alouettes
- DE – Joe Montford, Hamilton Tiger-Cats
- DT – Doug Petersen, Montreal Alouettes
- DT – Joe Fleming, Winnipeg Blue Bombers
- LB – Alondra Johnson, Calgary Stampeders
- LB – Willie Pless, Edmonton Eskimos
- LB – Calvin Tiggle, Hamilton Tiger-Cats
- CB – Donald Smith, Toronto Argonauts
- CB – Marvin Coleman, Calgary Stampeders
- HB – Gerald Vaughn, Hamilton Tiger-Cats
- HB – Kelly Wiltshire, Toronto Argonauts
- S – Maurice Kelly, Winnipeg Blue Bombers

=== Special teams ===
- K – Sean Fleming, Edmonton Eskimos
- P – Tony Martino, Calgary Stampeders
- ST – Eric Blount, Winnipeg Blue Bombers

=== Head coach ===
- Ron Lancaster, Hamilton Tiger-Cats

== 1998 CFL awards ==
- CFL's Most Outstanding Player Award – Mike Pringle (RB), Montreal Alouettes
- CFL's Most Outstanding Canadian Award – Mike Morreale (SB), Hamilton Tiger-Cats
- CFL's Most Outstanding Defensive Player Award – Joe Montford (DE), Hamilton Tiger-Cats
- CFL's Most Outstanding Offensive Lineman Award – Fred Childress (OG), Calgary Stampeders
- CFL's Most Outstanding Rookie Award – Steve Muhammad (DB), BC Lions
- CFLPA's Outstanding Community Service Award – Glen Scrivener (DT), Winnipeg Blue Bombers
- CFL's Coach of the Year – Ron Lancaster, Hamilton Tiger-Cats
- Commissioner's Award - Fausto Belluomini, Jim Hunt, Toronto Writer, Radio Broadcaster, and Jim Proudfoot
