= Robbie Keen =

American football player (born 1968)

No. 9, 10, 6
- Positions: Kicker, punter

Personal information
- Born: August 2, 1968 (age 58); Bremerton, Washington, U.S.
- Listed height: 6 ft 4 in (1.93 m)
- Listed weight: 215 lb (98 kg)

Career information
- High school: Casa Roble (Orangevale, California)
- College: California (1987–1990)
- NFL draft: 1991: 9th round, 244th overall pick

Career history
- Kansas City Chiefs (1991)*; San Francisco 49ers (1991–1992)*; → Sacramento Surge (1992); → Frankfurt Galaxy (1992); Cleveland Browns (1993)*; Las Vegas Posse (1994); Shreveport Pirates (1995); Edmonton Eskimos (1996)*
- * Offseason or practice squad member only

Awards and highlights
- First-team All-American (1989); Second-team All-American (1988); First-team All-Pac-10 (1988) (Note: Selected as both kicker and punter)

Career CFL statistics
- Games played: 36
- Punts: 297
- Punting yards: 11,405
- Average punt: 42.7
- Longest punt: 84
- Points scored: 7
- Kickoff yards: 3,265
- Stats at CFL.ca

Robbie Keen (born August 2, 1968) is an American former professional football placekicker and punter who played in the Canadian Football League (CFL) with the Las Vegas Posse, Shreveport Pirates and Edmonton Eskimos. He played college football for the California Golden Bears. Keen had stints in the National Football League (NFL) with the Kansas City Chiefs, San Francisco 49ers and Cleveland Browns and in the World League of American Football (WLAF) with the Sacramento Surge and Frankfurt Galaxy.

== Early life ==
Keen was born on August 2, 1968, in Bremerton, Washington. He attended Casa Roble High School in Orangevale, California.

== College career ==
Keen played college football for the California Golden Bears from 1987 to 1990. He was a first-team and second-team All-American in 1989 and 1988 respectively. Keen had an average of 42.5 yards per punt, 23 for 23 on extra points and 21 of 25 on field goals, which led the Pac-10. In 1991, he played in the East–West Shrine Game.

== Professional career ==
=== Kansas City Chiefs ===
Keen was selected in the ninth round, with the 244th overall selection, by the Kansas City Chiefs in the 1991 NFL draft. On August 19, he was released by the team.

=== San Francisco 49ers ===
On August 31, 1991, Keen was signed by the San Francisco 49ers. On September 26, he was signed to the practice squad. On February 6, 1992, Keen re-signed with the 49ers. On August 24, he was released by the team.

=== Sacramento Surge ===
In February 1992, Keen signed with the Sacramento Surge of the World League of American Football (WLAF). On March 9, he was traded to the Barcelona Dragons.

=== Frankfurt Galaxy ===
On March 17, 1992, Keen signed with the Frankfurt Galaxy. He was the team's kicker and punter, converting seven of 12 field goals and 17 of 17 extra points. Keen averaged 37.7 yards per punt.

=== Cleveland Browns ===
On April 20, 1993, Keen signed with the Cleveland Browns. On August 2, he was waived by the team.

=== Las Vegas Posse ===
In 1994, Keen played with the Las Vegas Posse in the Canadian Football League (CFL). He averaged 41.7 yards per punt with a long of 75 and had 3,365 kickoff yards. Keen also completed three passes for 62 yards and one touchdown.

=== Shreveport Pirates ===
in 1995, after the Las Vegas Posse folded, a dispersal draft was held and Keen was selected in the third round, with the 29th overall selection, by the Shreveport Pirates. As the team's punter, he kicked for an average of 43.8 yards and a long of 84. Keen went two of two on pass attempts for 36 yards.

=== Edmonton Eskimos ===
Keen was selected in the 1996 dispersal draft by the Edmonton Eskimos with the 43rd pick. On June 22, he was released by the team.
