= Paul Masotti =

Canadian football player (born 1965)

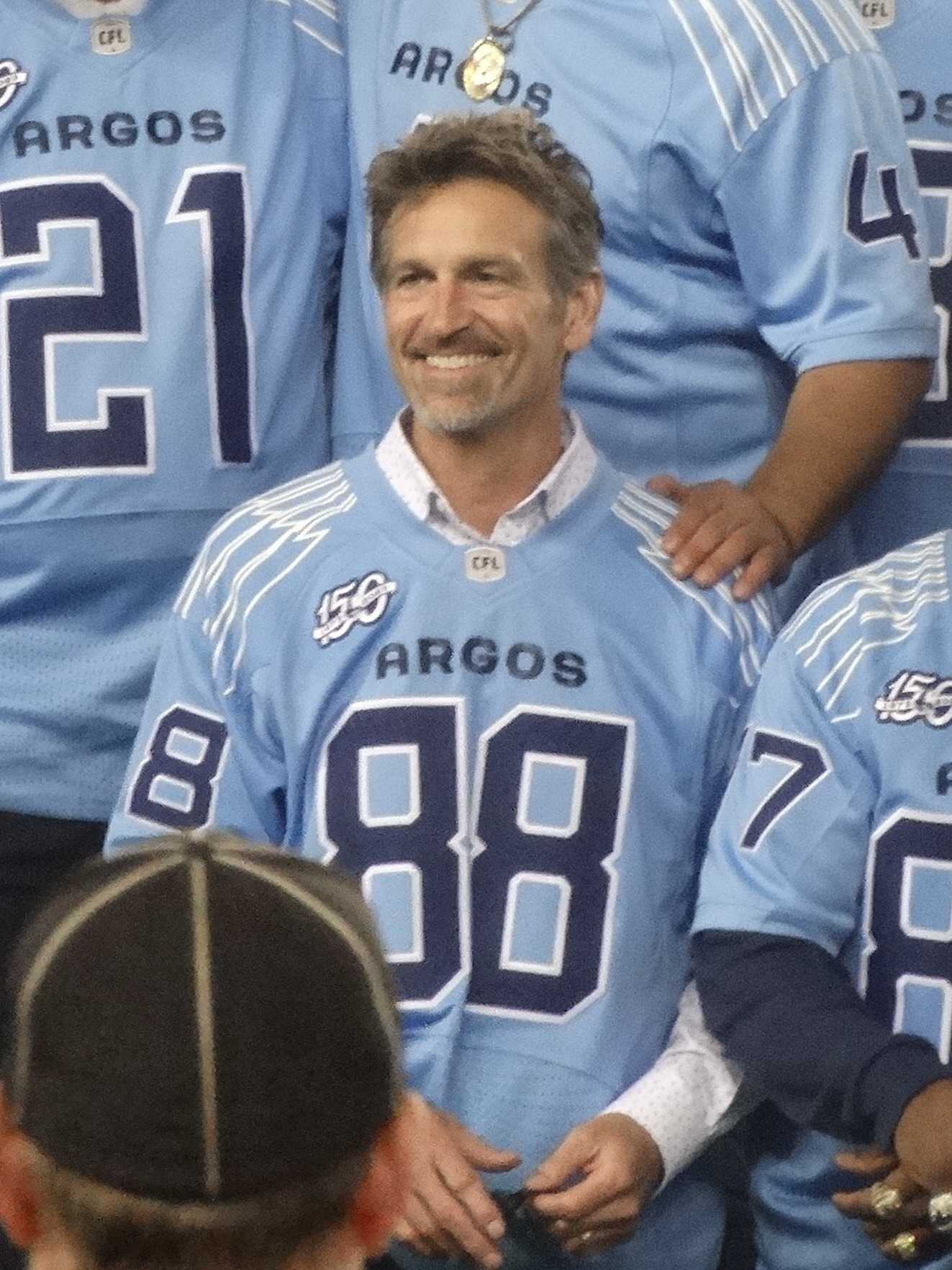
- Masotti in 2023

No. 88
- Position: Wide receiver

Personal information
- Born: March 10, 1965 (age 61); Hamilton, Ontario, Canada

Career information
- University: Acadia
- CFL draft: 1988: 2nd round, 15th overall pick

Career history
- 1988–1999: Toronto Argonauts

Awards and highlights
- 3× Grey Cup champion (1991, 1996, 1997); Dick Suderman Trophy (1997); CFL All-Star (1994); 3× CFL East All-Star (1994, 1996, 1998)

Paul Masotti (born March 10, 1965) is a Canadian former professional football player and current front office executive with the Canadian Football League (CFL)'s Toronto Argonauts. Masotti played the wide receiver position for 12 seasons with the Toronto Argonauts, from 1988 to 1999, retiring just before the 2000 season to join the Argos front office first as executive vice-president, and then as general manager.

== College career ==
Born in Hamilton, Ontario, Masotti played for the Axemen of Acadia University and was named an AUAA All-Star in 1985 and 1987.

== Professional career ==
Masotti was the Toronto Argonauts first pick and 15th overall in the 1988 CFL Canadian College Draft. Masotti, however, first signed as a free agent with the Washington Redskins of the National Football League and was one of the Redskins' final cuts. Masotti made his professional debut with the Argos on September 25, 1988.

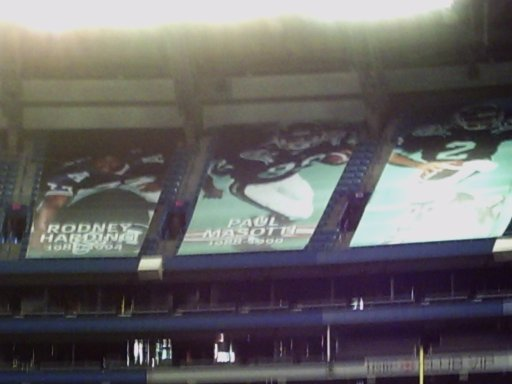
Masotti's banner hangs in Rogers Centre

Over his 12 seasons, all with the Argonauts, Masotti amassed four straight 1,000-yard seasons from 1994–1997, caught 556 passes for 8,772 yards (a club record for Canadian receivers; current club record holder is former teammate Derrell "Mookie" Mitchell) and 44 touchdowns, and won three Grey Cup rings.

In the 1997 Grey Cup, Masotti was named the Most Valuable Canadian Player leading the team with six receptions for 102 yards. Argos quarterback Doug Flutie, who won a new Chrysler truck as the Grey Cup Most Valuable Player, gave Masotti the prize in recognition of his accomplishments.

Following his retirement as an active player in 2000, a banner with Masotti's name and photograph was added to the list of All-Time Argonauts hanging from the rafters of the Rogers Centre. He is now working for Hillfield Strathallan College as Athletic Director.

Masotti is a first cousin of Mike Morreale, a former wide receiver in the CFL with the Argonauts & the Hamilton Tiger-Cats.

== CFL GM record ==
Team	Year	Regular season					Postseason		
Team	Year	Won	Lost	Ties	Win %	Finish	Won	Lost	Result
TOR	2001	7	11	0	.388	4th in East Division	-	-	Missed playoffs
TOR	2002	8	10	0	.444	2nd in East Division	1	1	Lost East final
TOR	2003	9	9	0	.500	2nd in East Division	1	1	Lost East final
Total		24	30	0	.444	0 Division; Championships	2	2	0 Grey Cups
