= 2000 CFL season =

Canadian Football League season

- Duration: July 5 – November 5, 2000
- East champions: Montreal Alouettes
- West champions: BC Lions

88th Grey Cup
- Date: November 26, 2000
- Venue: McMahon Stadium, Calgary
- Champions: BC Lions

CFL seasons
- ← 1999 2001 →

Canadian Football League team locations: West, East

The 2000 CFL season is considered to be the 47th season in modern-day Canadian football, although it is officially the 43rd Canadian Football League season.

== CFL news in 2000 ==
The CFL ended the 20th century on a continued upward curve.

After the 1999 season, league attendance levels and television ratings continued to grow. Attendance around the league had an increase of 5.6%, which went over '98 season figures as 1,718,312 fans filled their teams' stadium. TSN's television ratings also increased by 17.9% over their '98 season ratings. In 2000, CFL attendance and TSN television ratings continued to increase further going over the '99 season figures.

Both acting Commissioner & Chairman John Tory, and President & COO Jeff Giles resigned from their respective posts. On Wednesday, November 1, Michael Lysko was named as the tenth CFL commissioner in league history.

Calgary hosted the Grey Cup game and was successful in their week-long festival to celebrate the 88th championship season. The Grey Cup game itself ended with another classic finish, as the BC Lions spoiled the Montreal Alouettes' two-point convert attempt to hang on and win the Grey Cup, 28–26. Immediately following the game, BC Lions legendary kicker Lui Passaglia, who kicked the winning points, retired after 25 seasons.

== Regular season standings ==
West Division
Pos	Team	Pld	W	L	T	OTL	PF	PA	PD	Pts
1	Calgary Stampeders (C, Q)	18	12	5	1	0	604	495	+109	25
2	Edmonton Eskimos (Q)	18	10	7	0	1	527	520	+7	21
3	BC Lions (Q)	18	8	9	0	1	513	529	−16	17
4	Saskatchewan Roughriders	18	5	12	1	0	516	626	−110	11

Source: "CFL.ca". Archived from the original on June 29, 2009.
(C) First round bye; (Q) Qualified for playoffs

East Division
Pos	Team	Pld	W	L	T	OTL	PF	PA	PD	Pts
1	Montreal Alouettes (C, Q)	18	12	6	0	0	594	379	+215	24
2	Hamilton Tiger-Cats (Q)	18	9	7	0	2	470	446	+24	20
3	Winnipeg Blue Bombers (Q)	18	7	9	1	1	539	596	−57	16
4	Toronto Argonauts	18	7	10	1	0	390	562	−172	15

Source: "CFL.ca". Archived from the original on June 29, 2009.
(C) First round bye; (Q) Qualified for playoffs
- Teams losing in overtime were awarded one point.
- Calgary and Montreal both had first round byes.

== Grey Cup playoffs ==
The BC Lions were the 2000 Grey Cup Champions, defeating the Montreal Alouettes 28–26 at Calgary's McMahon Stadium. The Lions became the first team with a losing record (8–10, 1 OTL) to win the Grey Cup. The Lions' Robert Drummond (RB) was named the Grey Cup's Most Valuable Player and Sean Millington (FB) was the Grey Cup's Most Valuable Canadian.

=== Playoff bracket ===
November 12: Division semifinals
East
E3	Winnipeg Blue Bombers	22
E2	Hamilton Tiger-Cats	20
West
W3	BC Lions	34
W2	Edmonton Eskimos	32

November 19: Division finals
E3	Winnipeg Blue Bombers	24
E1	Montreal Alouettes	35
W3	BC Lions	37
W1	Calgary Stampeders	23

November 26: 88th Grey Cup; McMahon Stadium – Calgary, AB
E1	Montreal Alouettes	26
W3	BC Lions	28

== CFL leaders ==
- CFL passing leaders
- CFL rushing leaders
- CFL receiving leaders

== 2000 CFL All-Stars ==
=== Offence ===
- QB – Dave Dickenson, Calgary Stampeders
- RB – Sean Millington, BC Lions
- RB – Mike Pringle, Montreal Alouettes
- SB – Derrell Mitchell, Toronto Argonauts
- SB – Milt Stegall, Winnipeg Blue Bombers
- WR – Curtis Marsh, Saskatchewan Roughriders
- WR – Travis Moore, Calgary Stampeders
- C – Bryan Chiu, Montreal Alouettes
- OG – Andrew Greene, Saskatchewan Roughriders
- OG – Pierre Vercheval, Montreal Alouettes
- OT – Chris Perez, BC Lions
- OT – Bruce Beaton, Edmonton Eskimos

=== Defence ===
- DT – Demetrious Maxie, Saskatchewan Roughriders
- DT – Joe Fleming, Calgary Stampeders
- DE – Shonte Peoples, Calgary Stampeders
- DE – Joe Montford, Hamilton Tiger-Cats
- LB – George White, Saskatchewan Roughriders
- LB – Terry Ray, Edmonton Eskimos
- LB – Alondra Johnson, Calgary Stampeders
- CB – Marvin Coleman, Calgary Stampeders
- CB – Davis Sanchez, Montreal Alouettes
- DB – Eddie Davis, Calgary Stampeders
- DB – Barron Miles, Montreal Alouettes
- DS – Greg Frers, Calgary Stampeders

=== Special teams ===
- P – Noel Prefontaine, Toronto Argonauts
- K – Lui Passaglia, BC Lions
- ST – Albert Johnson III, Winnipeg Blue Bombers

== 2000 Western All-Stars ==
=== Offence ===
- QB – Dave Dickenson, Calgary Stampeders
- RB – Sean Millington, BC Lions
- RB – Kelvin Anderson, Calgary Stampeders
- SB – Terry Vaughn, Edmonton Eskimos
- SB – Alfred Jackson, BC Lions
- WR – Curtis Marsh, Saskatchewan Roughriders
- WR – Travis Moore, Calgary Stampeders
- C – Leo Groenewegen, Edmonton Eskimos
- OG – Andrew Greene, Saskatchewan Roughriders
- OG – Fred Childress, Calgary Stampeders
- OT – Chris Perez, BC Lions
- OT – Bruce Beaton, Edmonton Eskimos

=== Defence ===
- DT – Demetrious Maxie, Saskatchewan Roughriders
- DT – Joe Fleming, Calgary Stampeders
- DE – Shonte Peoples, Calgary Stampeders
- DE – Herman Smith, BC Lions
- LB – George White, Saskatchewan Roughriders
- LB – Terry Ray, Edmonton Eskimos
- LB – Alondra Johnson, Calgary Stampeders
- CB – Marvin Coleman, Calgary Stampeders
- CB – Eric Carter, BC Lions
- DB – Eddie Davis, Calgary Stampeders
- DB – Ralph Staten, Edmonton Eskimos
- DS – Greg Frers, Calgary Stampeders

=== Special teams ===
- P – Tony Martino, Calgary Stampeders
- K – Lui Passaglia, BC Lions
- ST – Marvin Coleman, Calgary Stampeders

== 2000 Eastern All-Stars ==
=== Offence ===
- QB – Anthony Calvillo, Montreal Alouettes
- RB – Ronald Williams, Hamilton Tiger-Cats
- RB – Mike Pringle, Montreal Alouettes
- SB – Derrell Mitchell, Toronto Argonauts
- SB – Milt Stegall, Winnipeg Blue Bombers
- WR – Ben Cahoon, Montreal Alouettes
- WR – Robert Gordon, Winnipeg Blue Bombers
- C – Bryan Chiu, Montreal Alouettes
- OG – Chris Burns, Hamilton Tiger-Cats
- OG – Pierre Vercheval, Montreal Alouettes
- OT – Dave Hack, Hamilton Tiger-Cats
- OT – Moe Elewonibi, Winnipeg Blue Bombers

=== Defence ===
- DT – Johnny Scott, Toronto Argonauts
- DT – Mike Philbrick, Hamilton Tiger-Cats
- DE – Swift Burch, Montreal Alouettes
- DE – Joe Montford, Hamilton Tiger-Cats
- LB – Mike O'Shea, Toronto Argonauts
- LB – Calvin Tiggle, Toronto Argonauts
- LB – Antonio Armstrong, Winnipeg Blue Bombers
- CB – Irvin Smith, Montreal Alouettes
- CB – Davis Sanchez, Montreal Alouettes
- DB – Chris Shelling, Hamilton Tiger-Cats
- DB – Barron Miles, Montreal Alouettes
- DS – Lester Smith, Montreal Alouettes

=== Special teams ===
- P – Noel Prefontaine, Toronto Argonauts
- K – Paul Osbaldiston, Hamilton Tiger-Cats
- ST – Albert Johnson III, Winnipeg Blue Bombers

== 2000 Intergold CFLPA All-Stars ==
=== Offence ===
- QB – Dave Dickenson, Calgary Stampeders
- OT – Moe Elewonibi, Winnipeg Blue Bombers
- OT – Chris Perez, BC Lions
- OG – Fred Childress, Calgary Stampeders
- OG – Andrew Greene, Saskatchewan Roughriders
- C – Carl Coulter, Hamilton Tiger-Cats
- RB – Mike Pringle, Montreal Alouettes
- FB – Sean Millington, BC Lions
- SB – Kez McCorvey, Edmonton Eskimos
- SB – Derrell Mitchell, Toronto Argonauts
- WR – Curtis Marsh, Saskatchewan Roughriders
- WR – Milt Stegall, Winnipeg Blue Bombers

=== Defence ===
- DE – Joe Montford, Hamilton Tiger-Cats
- DE – Herman Smith, BC Lions
- DT – Johnny Scott, Toronto Argonauts
- DT – Joe Fleming, Calgary Stampeders
- LB – Darryl Hall, Calgary Stampeders
- LB – Alondra Johnson, Calgary Stampeders
- LB – Terry Ray, Edmonton Eskimos
- CB – Juran Bolden, Winnipeg Blue Bombers
- CB – Davis Sanchez, Montreal Alouettes
- HB – Jackie Kellogg, Calgary Stampeders
- HB – Barron Miles, Montreal Alouettes
- S – Greg Frers, Calgary Stampeders

=== Special teams ===
- K – Lui Passaglia, BC Lions
- P – Noel Prefontaine, Toronto Argonauts
- ST – Albert Johnson III, Winnipeg Blue Bombers

=== Head coach ===
- Charlie Taaffe, Montreal Alouettes

== 2000 CFL awards ==
- CFL's Most Outstanding Player Award – Dave Dickenson (QB), Calgary Stampeders
- CFL's Most Outstanding Canadian Award – Sean Millington (RB), BC Lions
- CFL's Most Outstanding Defensive Player Award – Joe Montford (DE), Hamilton Tiger-Cats
- CFL's Most Outstanding Offensive Lineman Award – Pierre Vercheval (OG), Montreal Alouettes
- CFL's Most Outstanding Rookie Award – Albert Johnson III (WR), Winnipeg Blue Bombers
- CFL's Most Outstanding Special Teams Award – Albert Johnson III (WR), Winnipeg Blue Bombers
- CFLPA's Outstanding Community Service Award – Mike Morreale (SB), Hamilton Tiger-Cats
- CFL's Coach of the Year – Charlie Taaffe, Montreal Alouettes
- Commissioner's Award – Jeff Giles, Toronto
