= Servus Credit Union =

Canadian credit union

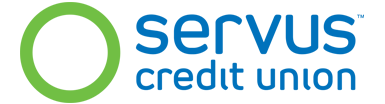
- Formerly: Capital City Savings
- Type: Credit union
- Industry: Financial services
- Founded: 1938 in Edmonton, Alberta, Canada
- Headquarters: Edmonton, Alberta, Canada
- Number of locations: 102
- Area served: Alberta
- Key people: Ian Burns (CEO/President)
- Total assets: $30.3 billion CAD (2026)
- Number of employees: 2,200 (2018)
- Website: www.servus.ca

Servus Credit Union is a member-owned, community-based financial institution based in Edmonton, Alberta. In 2015 became the second-largest credit union in Canada and the largest credit union in Alberta; in 2025 it became Canada's largest credit union as measured by total assets. In 2014, Servus has around 380,000 members, who are served by nearly 2,400 employees from 100 locations in 59 communities across Alberta and as of 2026 has $30.3 billion in assets.

== History ==
Servus was created through the merger of several smaller regional credit unions in Alberta, the largest being Capital City Savings & Credit Union, based in Edmonton, which was formed in 1938. The various branches, however, have separate histories going back to 1937.

In late September of 2006, the City of St. Albert officially opened the Servus Credit Union Place (or Servus Place for short), a multipurpose leisure centre in the city of St. Albert, Alberta.

On November 1, 2008, Servus Credit Union became Canada's first province-wide credit union when it amalgamated with Community Savings and Common Wealth Credit Union.

In September 2023, Servus members voted in favour of merging with connectFirst Credit Union.

== Structure ==
As a credit union Servus does not have shareholders, rather to do business with Servus customers must become members of the credit union. Member-ownership in Servus Credit Union is represented by the purchase of Common Shares, and this is required to open an account with the financial institution. Membership includes the right to democratically elect and run for a position on the Board of Directors.

== Profit Sharing ==
Instead of paying profits to shareholders, the company shares its profits with members, and paid out $54.1 million through its profit sharing program in 2018.

Profit sharing is paid to members in both cash and common shares, based on how much profit the company earns and how much its shares are worth. The Profit Share program has three parts:

- Patronage: Cash payments based on a percentage of the interest the member paid on loans and earned on deposits, plus the average balance they hold in their chequing and savings accounts.
- Common Share dividends: Common share dividends are paid as additional common shares.
- Investment share dividends: Dividends paid as additional investment shares that may be redeemed in cash.

The total amount of profit share paid to members is based on the credit union's financial performance each year. The Board of Directors determines the total profit share pay out at the end of the company's fiscal year (October 31).

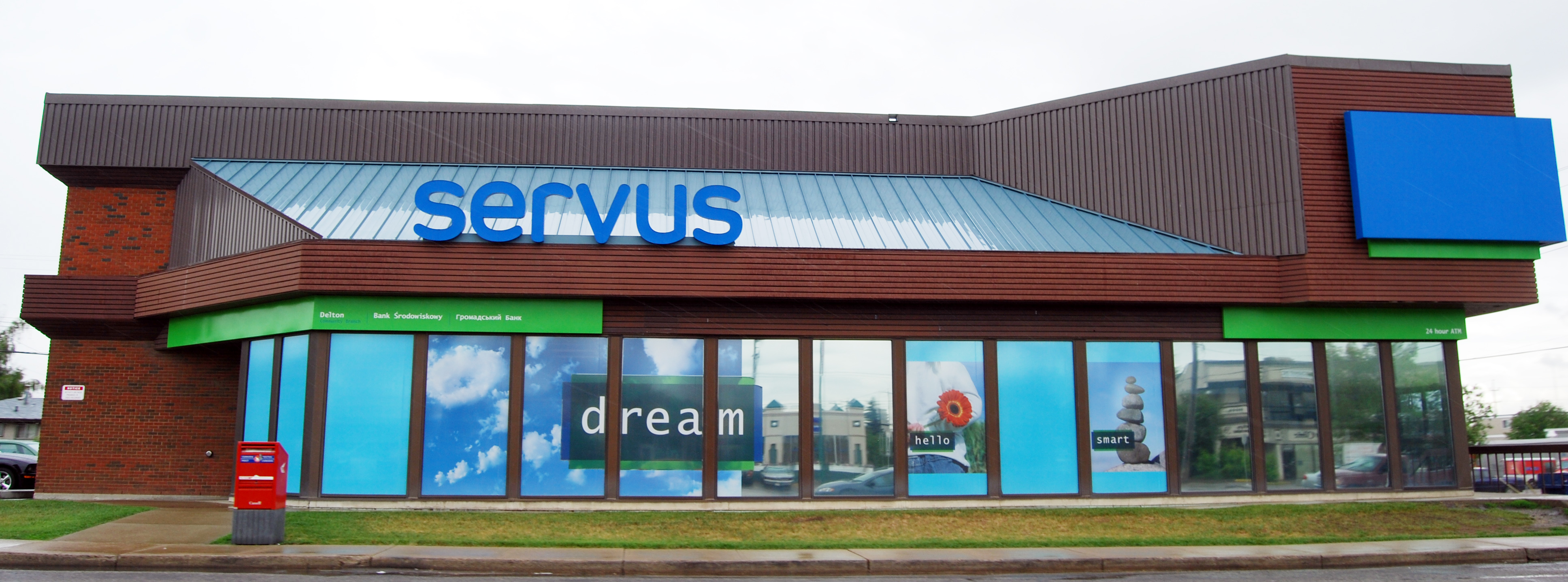
The Delton branch of Servus Credit Union in Edmonton

== General ==
Based in Edmonton, the credit union also has regional offices in Lloydminster and Red Deer. The company provides a complete line of financial services including: loans, deposits, investments, telephone and online banking, ATMs, debit and credit cards, financial planning, insurance, trust, agricultural and commercial services.

Deposits held by Servus Credit Union are insured by the Alberta Credit Union Deposit Guarantee Corporation. This guarantee is more extensive than the $100,000 insurance carried by banks in Alberta because all deposit amounts are fully guaranteed, including accrued interest to the date of payout, and this includes chequing and savings accounts, RRSP deposits, RRIF deposits, foreign currency deposits, and term deposits, including those with terms exceeding five years.

=== Board of directors ===
Servus Credit Union's Board of Directors consists of 12 members from around the province, elected by the credit union's membership.

== Awards ==
Credit Union of the Year as awarded by Alberta Central at the 2014 AGM and Conference

Member of the Platinum Club of Canada's 50 Best Managed Companies eight years running (2009-2017)

Member of the Venture 250, which recognizes Alberta's highest grossing companies

Highest rated financial institution in the 2015 Alberta Venture Customer Service Survey

Global Co-operator Award, which recognizes people or organizations that help support the development of co-operatives internationally (2015)

== Financials ==
As of July 4, 2019, Servus reported assets of $16.4 billion, and a net income of $22.7 million (after dividends, patronage and taxes).
