= Alondra Johnson =

American gridiron football player (born 1965)

No. 51
- Position: Linebacker

Personal information
- Born: July 22, 1965 (age 61); Gardena, California, U.S.

Career information
- College: West Texas State

Career history
- 1989–1990: BC Lions
- 1991–2003: Calgary Stampeders
- 2004: Saskatchewan Roughriders

Awards and highlights
- 3× Grey Cup champion (1992, 1998, 2001); Norm Fieldgate Trophy (1998); 3× CFL All-Star (1995, 1998, 2000); 5× CFL West All-Star (1991, 1992, 1997, 1998, 2000)
- Canadian Football Hall of Fame (Class of 2009)

Alondra Johnson (born July 22, 1965) is a former Canadian Football League (CFL) linebacker who played sixteen seasons in the CFL, mainly for the Calgary Stampeders. Johnson was a three-time All Star and won Grey Cups with Calgary in 1992, 1998 and 2001. He was inducted into the Canadian Football Hall of Fame in 2009.

Johnson first became a Stampeder back in 1991, playing the next 13 seasons as what many referred to as the 'heart of the Stampeder defence'. After being granted free agency in February 1991 from the B.C. Lions, Johnson signed with the Stampeders the same month and spent 13 years with the Stamps, winning three Grey Cup championship rings (1992, 1998, and 2001) and playing in three other Grey Cup finals.

From his linebacker spot, he finished with 1,095 tackles (second all-time in CFL history) and 83 special teams tackles for a grand total of 1,178 in 248 games. Johnson also had 45 quarterback sacks for 333 yards, 43 tackles for a total loss of 113 yards, 16 fumble recoveries with three for touchdowns, eight forced fumbles, 17 interceptions (one for a TD), and 10 pass knockdowns.

In 19 post-season games, Johnson registered 83 tackles and seven special team tackles for a total of 90, two QB sacks for 22 yards, seven tackles for a loss of eight yards, two interceptions, one forced fumble, and one pass knockdown.

In six Grey Cups, Johnson had 27 total tackles, a Grey Cup record, with one quarterback sack for 13 yards in the 2001 game and two tackles for loss in the 1991 final. In the 1998 Grey Cup victory, 26-24 over the Hamilton Tiger-Cats, he set the CFL record for the most defensive tackles in a Grey Cup game with eight. That 1998 season a total of 87 tackles spurred him to the Norm Freidgate Trophy as the Most Outstanding Defensive Player in the West Division, as well as being named a West Division and CFL All-Star.

He was also a CFL All-Star in 1995, 1998 and 2000, a West Division All-Star also in 1991, 1992, 1997, 1998 and 2000, and a North All-Star in 1995. Johnson was also the first CFL player to score on a two-point conversion in 1989.

In 2001 and 2002, he received the Stampeder President's Ring Award, voted by his teammates for his inspiration on and off the field.

In 2005, Johnson was inducted into the WTSU Hall of Champions.

In 2009, Johnson was inducted into the Canadian Football Hall of Fame.

In 2010, Johnson was inducted to the Calgary Stampeders Wall of Fame.
