= Jamie Crysdale =

Canadian gridiron football player (born 1968)

No. 67
- Position: Offensive lineman

Personal information
- Born: December 14, 1968 (age 57); Calgary, Alberta, Canada

Career information
- College: Cincinnati
- CFL draft: 1992: 4th round, 29th overall pick

Career history
- 1993–2005: Calgary Stampeders

Awards and highlights
- 2× Grey Cup champion (1998, 2001); CFL West All-Star (1998)

Jamie Crysdale (born December 14, 1968, in Calgary, Alberta) is a former offensive lineman for the Calgary Stampeders from 1993 to 2005. He played in three Grey Cups for the Stampeders, winning two. He was an CFL Western Division All-Star centre in 1998.
