= Joe Fleming =

American gridiron football player (born 1971)

No. 76
- Position: Defensive tackle

Personal information
- Born: December 5, 1971 (age 54); Wellesley, Massachusetts, U.S.
- Listed height: 6 ft 3 in (1.91 m)
- Listed weight: 285 lb (129 kg)

Career information
- High school: Xaverian Brothers (Westwood, Massachusetts)
- College: New Hampshire

Career history
- 1996–1997: BC Lions
- 1998–1999: Winnipeg Blue Bombers
- 2000–2004: Calgary Stampeders
- 2004–2005: Winnipeg Blue Bombers

Awards and highlights
- Grey Cup champion (2001); CFL's Most Outstanding Defensive Player Award (2003); Norm Fieldgate Trophy (2003); 4× CFL All-Star (1998, 2000, 2001, 2003); CFL East All-Star (1998); 4× CFL West All-Star (2000, 2001, 2003, 2004)
- Stats at CFL.ca

Joe Fleming (born December 5, 1971) is an American former professional football defensive end who played in the Canadian Football League (CFL). Over his ten years in the CFL he played for three teams and did not play during the 2002 CFL season.

Fleming announced his retirement prior to the 2006 CFL football season.

== Early life ==
Fleming attended Xaverian Brothers High School in Westwood, Massachusetts, and was a star in both football and hockey, along with being a top student. In football, he was a Boston Globe and a Quincy Patriot Ledger All-Scholastic Choice while playing at the University of New Hampshire. In ice hockey he was selected in the twelfth round of the 1990 NHL entry draft by the St. Louis Blues.
