= ConnectFirst Credit Union =

Connect First Credit Union Ltd
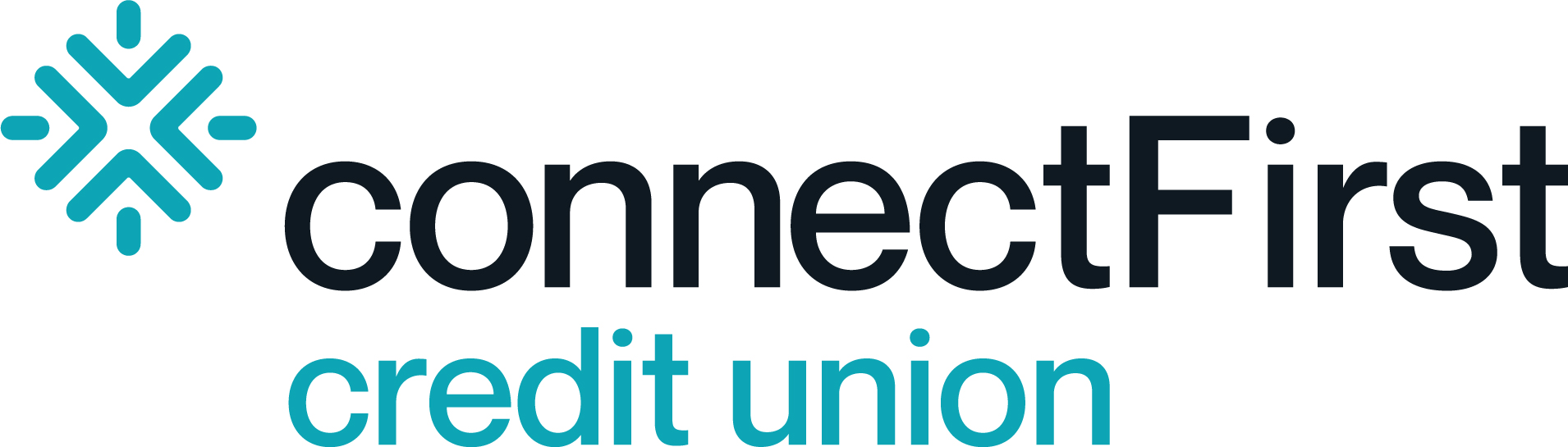
- Type: Credit Union
- Industry: Financial services
- Founded: 1938
- Headquarters: Calgary, Alberta, Canada
- Key people: Kendra Holland, Interim CEO
- Revenue: $123.2 million CAD (2009)
- Net income: $6.6 million CAD (2009)
- Total assets: $2.5 billion CAD (2010)
- Number of employees: 700 (2022)
- Website: www.connectfirstcu.com

Connect First Credit Union Ltd is a Canadian financial institution based in Calgary, Alberta.

On May 3, 2021, connectFirst Credit Union was created from the amalgamation of four credit unions: First Calgary Financial, Chinook Financial, Mountain View Financial and Legacy Financial. The organization was established in 1987 through the merger of seven open-bond credit unions, as well as two additional credit union purchases. The first member-owned credit union that would eventually become First Calgary Financial was founded in 1938. On October 26, 2014, it was announced that First Calgary Financial will merge with Chinook Credit Union to form Alberta's second largest credit union under the name Connect First Credit Union.

connectFirst Credit Union is one of the largest credit unions in Canada - a full-service financial institution with over $6 billion in assets under administration - and serves more 128 000 members across 41 branches in communities across Central and Southern Alberta. In addition to its 41 retail banking branches, it includes a Business Solutions Centre, a Commercial Banking group, Independent Business and Agriculture Group, a Dealer Services team and a locally based Contact Centre.

In November 2023, connectFirst members voted in favour of merging with Servus Credit Union.
