= Paul Osbaldiston =

Canadian football player (born 1964)

No. 3
- Positions: Punter, Kicker

Personal information
- Born: April 27, 1964 (age 62); Oldham, England
- Listed height: 6 ft 3 in (1.91 m)
- Listed weight: 225 lb (102 kg)

Career information
- College: Western Montana
- CFL draft: 1986: 7th round, 63rd overall pick

Career history
- 1986: BC Lions
- 1986: Winnipeg Blue Bombers
- 1986–2003: Hamilton Tiger-Cats

Awards and highlights
- 2× Grey Cup champion (1986, 1999); Dick Suderman Trophy (1986); Lew Hayman Trophy (1990); 3× CFL All-Star (1996, 1998, 2001); 5× CFL East All-Star (1996, 1998, 1999, 2000, 2001); Records: 1986 tied Grey Cup record for most field goals (6); 1990 most points in a season (233)

Paul Osbaldiston (born April 27, 1964) is a former punter and placekicker for the Hamilton Tiger-Cats of the Canadian Football League (CFL) from 1986 to 2003. He was the Assistant Special Teams/Kicking Coach for the Tiger-Cats until 2014. Osbaldiston was a three-time CFL All-Star, seven-time East Division All-Star and a member of Hamilton’s 1986 and 1999 Grey Cup championship teams.

== Early career ==
Osbaldiston was born in Oldham, Lancashire, England. He played his rookie season for the British Columbia Lions and the Winnipeg Blue Bombers. He also played for the Richmond Raiders of the British Columbia Football Conference (CJFL) from 1983 to 1985.

== Records ==
CFL

- most field goals in a regular season game (8, tied with Dave Ridgeway, Mark McLoughlin and Lirim Hajrullahu)

Hamilton Tiger-Cats

- career scoring (2856 points)
- single season scoring (233 points)
- career converts (652)
- single season converts (63)
- single game converts (9)
- career field goals (655)
- single season field goals (54)
- single game field goals (8)
- career punting yards(88,542)
- career punts (2,127)
- single season punts (165)
