= 1997 CFL season =

Canadian Football League season

- Duration: June 25 – October 26, 1997
- East champions: Toronto Argonauts
- West champions: Saskatchewan Roughriders

85th Grey Cup
- Date: November 16, 1997
- Venue: Commonwealth Stadium, Edmonton
- Champions: Toronto Argonauts

CFL seasons
- ← 1996 1998 →

Canadian Football League team locations: West, East

The 1997 CFL season is considered to be the 44th season in modern-day Canadian football, although it is officially the 40th Canadian Football League season.

== CFL news in 1997 ==
The CFL entered the 1997 season with eight teams, instead of nine. The Ottawa Rough Riders ceased operations and folded after the 1996 season. In February, a dispersal draft was held for the players who were under contract with the Ottawa franchise.

The Montreal Alouettes began the 1997 season under new ownership, which was headed by Robert C. Wetenhall. Wetenhall and his ownership group retained the Alouette name and logo.

With the Rough Riders departure, the CFL returned the Winnipeg Blue Bombers to the East Division.

The CFL also changed the playoff format, adding a 'cross-over' rule. Previously, the 3rd place team in each division played the 2nd place team in the division semifinals. Under the new rule, should the 4th place team in one division have a better record than that of the 3rd place team in the other division, the 4th place team crosses over to the other division's semifinal, taking that 3rd place team's place. There is no tie-breaker; the cross-over hopeful must have a strictly better record to advance. BC attained a cross-over playoff berth in the first year under this rule. The rule remains in effect.

== Regular season standings ==
=== Final regular season standings ===
West Division
Pos	Team	Pld	W	L	T	PF	PA	PD	Pts
1	Edmonton Eskimos (C, Q)	18	12	6	0	479	400	+79	24
2	Calgary Stampeders (Q)	18	10	8	0	522	442	+80	20
3	Saskatchewan Roughriders (Q)	18	8	10	0	413	479	−66	16
4	BC Lions (Q)	18	8	10	0	429	536	−107	16

Source: "CFL.ca". Archived from the original on July 15, 2009.
(C) First round bye; (Q) Qualified for playoffs

East Division
Pos	Team	Pld	W	L	T	PF	PA	PD	Pts
1	Toronto Argonauts (C, Q)	18	15	3	0	660	327	+333	30
2	Montreal Alouettes (Q)	18	13	5	0	509	532	−23	26
3	Winnipeg Blue Bombers	18	4	14	0	443	548	−105	8
4	Hamilton Tiger-Cats	18	2	16	0	362	549	−187	4

Source: "1997 Regular Season Standings". Canadian Football League. Archived from the original on October 29, 2008.
(C) First round bye; (Q) Qualified for playoffs
- Edmonton and Toronto both had first round byes.
- Due to the cross-over rule – the BC Lions played the Montreal Alouettes in the East Semi-Final Game.

== Grey Cup playoffs ==
The Toronto Argonauts won their second-straight Grey Cup championship in 1997, defeating the Saskatchewan Roughriders 47–23, at Edmonton's Commonwealth Stadium. The Argonauts' Doug Flutie (QB) was named the Grey Cup's Most Valuable Player and Paul Masotti (WR) was the Grey Cup's Most Valuable Canadian.

=== Playoff bracket ===
November 2: Division Semifinals
East
W4	BC Lions	35
E2	Montreal Alouettes	45
West
W3	Saskatchewan Roughriders	33
W2	Calgary Stampeders	30

November 9: Division Finals
E2	Montreal Alouettes	30
E1	Toronto Argonauts	37
W3	Saskatchewan Roughriders	31
W1	Edmonton Eskimos	30

November 16: 85th Grey Cup @ Commonwealth Stadium – Edmonton, AB
E1	Toronto Argonauts	47
W3	Saskatchewan Roughriders	23

== CFL leaders ==
- CFL passing leaders
- CFL rushing leaders
- CFL receiving leaders

== 1997 CFL All-Stars ==
=== Offence ===
- QB – Doug Flutie, Toronto Argonauts
- FB – Robert Drummond, Toronto Argonauts
- RB – Mike Pringle, Montreal Alouettes
- SB – Derrell Mitchell, Toronto Argonauts
- SB – Darren Flutie, Edmonton Eskimos
- WR – Alfred Jackson, BC Lions
- WR – Milt Stegall, Winnipeg Blue Bombers
- C – Mike Kiselak, Toronto Argonauts
- OG – Fred Childress, Calgary Stampeders
- OG – Pierre Vercheval, Toronto Argonauts
- OT – Uzooma Okeke, Montreal Alouettes
- OT – Neal Fort, Montreal Alouettes

=== Defence ===
- DT – Rob Waldrop, Toronto Argonauts
- DT – Doug Petersen, Montreal Alouettes
- DE – Elfrid Payton, Montreal Alouettes
- DE – Bobby Jurasin, Saskatchewan Roughriders
- LB – Maurice Kelly, BC Lions
- LB – Willie Pless, Edmonton Eskimos
- LB – Shonte Peoples, Winnipeg Blue Bombers
- CB – Kavis Reed, Edmonton Eskimos
- CB – Marvin Coleman, Calgary Stampeders
- DB – Glenn Rogers Jr., Edmonton Eskimos
- DB – Johnnie Harris, Toronto Argonauts
- DS – Lester Smith, Toronto Argonauts

=== Special teams ===
- P/K – Mike Vanderjagt, Toronto Argonauts
- ST – Mike "Pinball" Clemons, Toronto Argonauts

== 1997 Eastern All-Stars ==
=== Offence ===
- QB – Doug Flutie, Toronto Argonauts
- FB – Robert Drummond, Toronto Argonauts
- RB – Mike Pringle, Montreal Alouettes
- SB – Derrell Mitchell, Toronto Argonauts
- SB – Jock Climie, Montreal Alouettes
- WR – Paul Masotti, Toronto Argonauts
- WR – Milt Stegall, Winnipeg Blue Bombers
- C – Mike Kiselak, Toronto Argonauts
- OG – Bruce Beaton, Montreal Alouettes
- OG – Pierre Vercheval, Toronto Argonauts
- OT – Uzooma Okeke, Montreal Alouettes
- OT – Neal Fort, Montreal Alouettes

=== Defence ===
- DT – Rob Waldrop, Toronto Argonauts
- DT – Doug Petersen, Montreal Alouettes
- DE – Elfrid Payton, Montreal Alouettes
- DE – Willie Whitehead, Hamilton Tiger-Cats
- LB – Ken Benson, Toronto Argonauts
- LB – Mike O'Shea, Toronto Argonauts
- LB – Shonte Peoples, Winnipeg Blue Bombers
- CB – Adrion Smith, Toronto Argonauts
- CB – Orlando Steinauer, Hamilton Tiger-Cats
- DB – Harold Nash, Montreal Alouettes
- DB – Johnnie Harris, Toronto Argonauts
- DS – Lester Smith, Toronto Argonauts

=== Special teams ===
- P/K – Mike Vanderjagt, Toronto Argonauts
- ST – Mike "Pinball" Clemons, Toronto Argonauts

== 1997 Western All-Stars ==
=== Offence ===
- QB – Jeff Garcia, Calgary Stampeders
- FB – Kelvin Anderson, Calgary Stampeders
- RB – Sean Millington, BC Lions
- SB – Vince Danielsen, Calgary Stampeders
- SB – Darren Flutie, Edmonton Eskimos
- WR – Alfred Jackson, BC Lions
- WR – Terry Vaughn, Calgary Stampeders
- C – Mike Withycombe, BC Lions
- OG – Fred Childress, Calgary Stampeders
- OG – Leo Groenewegen, Edmonton Eskimos
- OT – Thomas Rayam, Edmonton Eskimos
- OT – John Terry, Saskatchewan Roughriders

=== Defence ===
- DT – Joe Fleming, BC Lions
- DT – Bennie Goods, Edmonton Eskimos
- DE – Malvin Hunter, Edmonton Eskimos
- DE – Bobby Jurasin, Saskatchewan Roughriders
- LB – Maurice Kelly, BC Lions
- LB – Willie Pless, Edmonton Eskimos
- LB – Alondra Johnson, Calgary Stampeders
- CB – Kavis Reed, Edmonton Eskimos
- CB – Marvin Coleman, Calgary Stampeders
- DB – Glenn Rogers Jr., Edmonton Eskimos
- DB – Dale Joseph, Saskatchewan Roughriders
- DS – Trent Brown, Edmonton Eskimos

=== Special teams ===
- P/K – Mark McLoughlin, Calgary Stampeders
- ST – Gizmo Williams, Edmonton Eskimos

== 1997 Intergold CFLPA All-Stars ==
=== Offence ===
- QB – Doug Flutie, Toronto Argonauts
- OT – John Terry, Saskatchewan Roughriders
- OT – Rocco Romano, Calgary Stampeders
- OG – Fred Childress, Calgary Stampeders
- OG – Bruce Beaton, Montreal Alouettes
- C – Mike Kiselak, Toronto Argonauts
- RB – Robert Drummond, Toronto Argonauts
- FB – Sean Millington, BC Lions
- SB – Milt Stegall, Winnipeg Blue Bombers
- SB – Darren Flutie, Edmonton Eskimos
- WR – Alfred Jackson, BC Lions
- WR – Terry Vaughn, Calgary Stampeders

=== Defence ===
- DE – Elfrid Payton, Montreal Alouettes
- DE – Leroy Blugh, Edmonton Eskimos
- DT – John Kropke, Saskatchewan Roughriders
- DT – Rob Waldrop, Toronto Argonauts
- OLB – Darryl Hall, Calgary Stampeders
- OLB – Shonte Peoples, Winnipeg Blue Bombers
- ILB – Calvin Tiggle, Hamilton Tiger-Cats
- CB – Donald Smith, Toronto Argonauts
- CB – Marvin Coleman, Calgary Stampeders
- HB – Glenn Rogers Jr., Edmonton Eskimos
- HB – Johnnie Harris, Toronto Argonauts
- S – Trent Brown, Edmonton Eskimos

=== Special teams ===
- K – Mark McLoughlin, Calgary Stampeders
- P – Tony Martino, Calgary Stampeders
- ST – Mike "Pinball" Clemons, Toronto Argonauts

=== Head coach ===
- Adam Rita, BC Lions

== 1997 CFL awards ==
- CFL's Most Outstanding Player Award – Doug Flutie (QB), Toronto Argonauts
- CFL's Most Outstanding Canadian Award – Sean Millington (FB), BC Lions
- CFL's Most Outstanding Defensive Player Award – Willie Pless (LB), Edmonton Eskimos
- CFL's Most Outstanding Offensive Lineman Award – Mike Kiselak (C), Toronto Argonauts
- CFL's Most Outstanding Rookie Award – Derrell Mitchell (SB), Toronto Argonauts
- CFLPA's Outstanding Community Service Award – Mark McLoughlin (K), Calgary Stampeders
- CFL's Coach of the Year – Don Matthews, Toronto Argonauts
- Commissioner's Award - Pat Bowlen and Jack Agrios
