= Jack Agrios =

Greek Canadian lawyer

Jack Agrios OC KC
- Born: Jack Nicholas Agrios; April 11, 1938 (age 88); Edmonton, Alberta, Canada
- Education: University of Alberta

Jack Nicholas Agrios (born April 11, 1938) is a Canadian lawyer.

Born in Edmonton, Alberta, he received a Bachelor of Arts in 1959 and a Bachelor of Laws in 1960 from the University of Alberta. He was called to the Alberta Bar in 1961 and was appointed Queen's Counsel in 1978.

He has been a director and executive member of the Edmonton Eskimos. He chaired the organizing committee of the 2001 World Championships in Athletics, the first time the event had visited North America. He was awarded the International Amateur Athletic Federation Silver Order of Merit.

In 2002, he was made an Officer of the Order of Canada in recognition for being "a respected lawyer and consummate volunteer".
