= Vince Danielsen =

Canadian football player (born 1971)

No. 88
- Position: Slotback

Personal information
- Born: November 26, 1971 (age 54); Vancouver, British Columbia, Canada

Career information
- University: British Columbia

Career history
- 1994–2001: Calgary Stampeders

Awards and highlights
- 2× Grey Cup champion (1998, 2001); Dick Suderman Trophy (1998); Dr. Beattie Martin Trophy (1998); CFL West All-Star (1998)

Vince Danielsen (born November 26, 1971) is a Canadian former professional football receiver for the Calgary Stampeders of the Canadian Football League from 1994 to 2001. He was selected third overall in the bonus round of the 1994 Canadian College Draft. Danielsen was a West Division All-Star two times and was the Grey Cup Most Valuable Canadian in 1998, and won another Grey Cup title in his last season in 2001. He played CIS football for the UBC Thunderbirds.

In 1998, Danielsen opened a private training studio in Calgary known as Innovative Fitness In 2006, this became known as the Innovative Fitness and Health Group. Later, it merged with Foothills Health Consultants. With Vince as the CEO, it was rebranded as Inliv. During those years, Vince wanted to find a way to help more Canadians, thus Wello was born, an innovative platform that offered virtual medical care.

At the age of 14, Danielsen was diagnosed with non-Hodgkin's lymphoma. He has focused on childhood cancer as a charitable cause in Calgary, both by fund raising and in hospital support. With fund raising his company has donated over $760,000 through the Train the Trainer event, and Every Yard Counts. All proceeds benefiting The Alberta Children's Hospital and The Kids Cancer Care Foundation to support all kids facing childhood cancer.
