= Johnny Scott (Canadian football) =

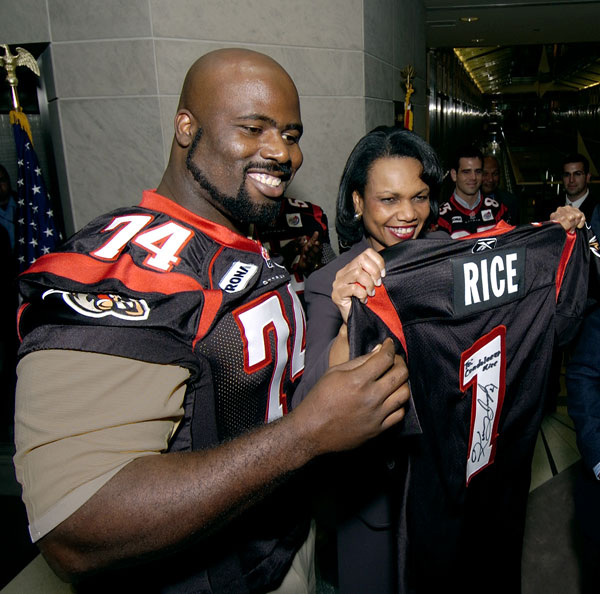
Scott presents an Ottawa Renegades jersey to U.S. Secretary of State Condoleezza Rice at the American Embassy in 2005.

Johnny Roy Scott (born July 15, 1969 in Austin, Texas) is a former all-star defensive lineman in the Canadian Football League (CFL).

== Biography ==
Unusual for modern football players, Scott did not go to college, but went pro directly from Albert Sidney Johnston High School. He signed as a free agent with the Shreveport Pirates (part of the CFL's failed expansion to the United States) and played two years (1994 and 1995) recording three sacks. He played the next four years with the B.C. Lions (67 games), twice being named an all star with 35 total sacks. He moved on to the Toronto Argonauts in 2000, playing three years there and getting 11 sacks in 30 games and being named an all star twice. He played 2003 and 2004 with the Hamilton Tiger-Cats (28 games and 5 sacks) and played two games with the Ottawa Renegades in 2005.
