= Darryl Hall (gridiron football) =

American gridiron football player (born 1966)

No. 7, 40, 43, 4
- Positions: Linebacker, defensive back

Personal information
- Born: August 1, 1966 (age 60); Oscoda, Michigan, U.S.
- Listed height: 6 ft 2 in (1.88 m)
- Listed weight: 210 lb (95 kg)

Career information
- High school: Lompoc (Lompoc, California)
- College: Washington

Career history
- 1989: Seattle Seahawks*
- 1990–1992: Calgary Stampeders
- 1993–1994: Denver Broncos
- 1995: San Francisco 49ers
- 1996–2000: Calgary Stampeders
- * Offseason or practice squad member only

Awards and highlights
- 2× Grey Cup champion (1992, 1998); 6× CFL All-Star (1991, 1992, 1997, 1998, 1999, 2000)
- Stats at Pro Football Reference
- Canadian Football Hall of Fame (Class of 2025)

Darryl Edgar Hall (born August 1, 1966) is an American former professional football linebacker and defensive back who played eight seasons in the Canadian Football League (CFL) and three seasons in the National Football League (NFL). He is a two-time Grey Cup champion after winning with the Calgary Stampeders in 1992 and 1998. He also played with the Denver Broncos and San Francisco 49ers.

Hall was inducted into the Canadian Football Hall of Fame in 2025.
