= 85th Grey Cup =

1997 Canadian Football championship game

Toronto Argonauts	Saskatchewan Roughriders
(15–3)	(8–10)
47	23
Head coach: Don Matthews	Head coach: Jim Daley
	1	2	3	4	Total
Toronto Argonauts	7	13	21	6	47
Saskatchewan Roughriders	3	6	0	14	23
- Date: November 16, 1997
- Stadium: Commonwealth Stadium
- Location: Edmonton
- Most Valuable Player: Doug Flutie, QB (Argonauts)
- Most Valuable Canadian: Paul Masotti, WR (Argonauts)
- Halftime show: Trooper
- Attendance: 60,431

Broadcasters
- Network: CBC, RDS
- Announcers: (CBC) Steve Armitage, Chris Cuthbert, David Archer, Mark Lee, Chris Walby, Brian Williams, Glen Suitor, Caroline Corey

The 85th Grey Cup (Canadian Football League championship) was held in 1997 in Edmonton before 60,431 fans. The heavily favoured Toronto Argonauts won the game over the Saskatchewan Roughriders with a score of 47–23.

== Game summary ==
Toronto Argonauts (47) - TDs, Doug Flutie, Adrion Smith, Robert Drummond, Mike "Pinball" Clemons, Derrell Mitchell; FGs, Mike Vanderjagt (4); cons., Vanderjagt (5).

Saskatchewan Roughriders (23) - TDs, Reggie Slack, Mike Saunders, Shawn Daniels; FGs, Paul McCallum; cons., McCallum (2).

First quarter
SSK—FG McCallum 28-yard field goal (SSK 3–0)
TOR—TD Mitchell 34-yard pass from Flutie (Vanderjagt convert) (TOR 7–3)
Second quarter
TOR—TD Drummond 6-yard pass from Flutie (Vanderjagt convert) (TOR 14–3)
TOR—FG Vanderjagt (TOR 17–3)
SSK—TD Daniels 3-yard run (TOR 17–9)
TOR—FG Vanderjagt 12-yard field goal (TOR 20–9)
Third quarter
TOR—TD Smith 95-yard run off the kickoff (Vanderjagt convert) (TOR 27–9)
TOR—TD Flutie 10-yard run (Vanderjagt convert) (TOR 34–9)
TOR—TD Clemons pass from Flutie (Vanderjagt convert) (TOR 41–9)
Fourth quarter
TOR—FG Vanderjagt (TOR 44–9)
SSK—TD Saunders 51-yard pass from Slack (McCallum convert) (TOR 44–16)
TOR—FG Vanderjagt (TOR 47–16)
SSK—TD Slack 1-yard run (McCallum convert) (TOR 47–23)

The game started well for Saskatchewan, with Shannon Baker returning the opening kick-off 74 yards deep into Toronto territory. Five plays later, the Roughriders scored a 28-yard field goal from Paul McCallum.

After the two teams exchanged interceptions, the Argonauts engineered a 32-yard drive culminating in a touchdown strike from quarterback Doug Flutie to Derrell Mitchell to put Toronto in the lead, 7–3. Doug Flutie then marched the Argos down the field again and hit Robert Drummond with a 6-yard touchdown pass to stretch the margin to 14–3.

Saskatchewan edged closer with 3-yard touchdown plunge from Shawn Daniels, but the convert failed, leaving the score 14–9. Then Toronto kicker Mike Vanderjagt kicked two field goals, one on the final play of the first half, to extend the lead to 20-9 going into the locker room.

The turning point in the game came on the first play of the second half. Toronto kick returner Adrion Smith caught the ball on his own 15-yard line, started toward the right sideline for a record 95 return for a touchdown. Shortly after an interception, Flutie engineered a 73-yard drive, and called his own number from 10 yards out to score again. Still in the third quarter Flutie spotted Mike "Pinball" Clemons open in the end zone for the third touchdown in the quarter. The score after three quarters was 41–9.

Saskatchewan scored in the fourth quarter when Mike Saunders hauled in a 51-yard touchdown pass from scrambling quarterback Reggie Slack. Vanderjagt added two more field goals for Toronto and Slack plunged in from 1 yard out to round out the scoring.

== Trivia ==
- Doug Flutie, who threw for 350 yards, claimed Most Valuable Player honours along with a brand new Dodge Dakota, while Paul Masotti was named Most Valuable Canadian. While on air live, and upon being named Grey Cup MVP, Flutie handed the keys to the Dakota over to Masotti. When his generosity was acknowledged by the announcer, Flutie remarked "I have one (a MVP truck) from last year." (When he was also MVP.)
- The game was originally slated to be held at Memorial Stadium in Baltimore, Maryland, but the Baltimore Stallions' relocation to Montreal, Quebec to become the new Alouettes a year earlier along with the ownership situation struggle in Montreal made it impossible to hold the game in that city. The league then awarded the game to Edmonton at the 1996 Grey Cup weekend. Had the Stallions still been in operation in 1997, it would have marked the first Grey Cup game to be held outside of Canada.

== 1997 CFL Playoffs ==
=== West Division ===
- Semi-final (November 2 @ Calgary, Alberta) Saskatchewan Roughriders 33-30 Calgary Stampeders
- Final (November 9 @ Edmonton, Alberta) Saskatchewan Roughriders 31-30 Edmonton Eskimos

=== East Division ===
- Semi-final (November 2 @ Montreal, Quebec) Montreal Alouettes 45-35 BC Lions*
- Final (November 9 @ Toronto, Ontario) Toronto Argonauts 37-30 Montreal Alouettes

* Cross over from West Division
