= 86th Grey Cup =

1998 Canadian Football championship game

Calgary Stampeders	Hamilton Tiger-Cats
(12–6)	(12–5–1)
26	24
Head coach: Wally Buono	Head coach: Ron Lancaster
	1	2	3	4	Total
Calgary Stampeders	4	6	7	9	26
Hamilton Tiger-Cats	3	13	2	6	24
- Date: November 22, 1998
- Stadium: Winnipeg Stadium
- Location: Winnipeg
- Most Valuable Player: Jeff Garcia, QB (Stampeders)
- Most Valuable Canadian: Vince Danielsen, SB (Stampeders)
- National anthem: Susan Aglukark
- Referee: Jake Ireland
- Halftime show: Love Inc.
- Attendance: 34,157

Broadcasters
- Network: CBC, RDS
- Announcers: (CBC) Steve Armitage, Chris Cuthbert, Mark Lee, Chris Walby, Brian Williams, Glen Suitor, Caroline Corey
- Ratings: 3.06 million

The 86th Grey Cup (Canadian Football League championship) was held in 1998 in Winnipeg. The Calgary Stampeders won the game over the Hamilton Tiger-Cats with a score of 26–24.

== Game summary ==
Calgary Stampeders (26) - TDs, Jeff Garcia, Kelvin Anderson; FGs, Mark McLoughlin (4); cons., McLoughlin; singles, McLoughlin.

Hamilton Tiger-Cats (24) - TDs, Ronald Williams (2); FGs, Paul Osbaldiston (3); cons., Osbaldiston; singles, Osbaldiston (2).

First quarter
CAL—Single McLoughlin missed field goal, one-point granted
HAM—FG Osbaldiston 24-yard field goal
CAL—FG McLoughlin 34-yard field goal
Second quarter
CAL—TD Anderson 3-yard run
HAM—FG Osbaldiston 20-yard field-goal
HAM—TD Williams pass from McManus (Osbaldiston convert)
HAM—FG Osbaldiston
Third quarter
HAM—Single Osbaldiston missed 44 yard-field goal attempt, one-point granted
HAM—Single Osbaldiston 66-yard punt kick was in the end zone, one-point granted
CAL—TD Garcia 1-yard run (McLoughlin convert)
Fourth quarter
CAL—FG McLoughlin
CAL—FG McLoughlin
HAM—TD Williams 4-yard run
CAL—FG McLoughlin

As the game began, the temperature was 10 degrees Celsius, under sunny skies. However, after the sun went down, the temperatures plummeted.

Mark McLoughlin missed the opening field goal attempt, but Calgary opened the scoring with a single point.

The Ti-Cats ran the ball down the field, and Paul Osbaldiston kicked a 24-yard field goal to make the game 3-1. Minutes later, McLoughlin made up for his earlier failure with a 34 field goal to put the Stampeders ahead 4-3.

Kelvin Anderson ran in a 3-yard touchdown five minutes into the second quarter. The convert failed, and the Stamps led 10-3. Osbaldiston kicked in a Ti-Cats field goal from the 20-yard line to close the gap at 10-6. Hamilton got revenge with just over three minutes to go in the half, with a great reception by Ronald Williams. Osbaldiston nailed the convert and the Hamilton Tiger-Cats led 13-10. Osbaldiston finished out the half with his third field goal of the game to put the Ti-Cats up 16-10 going into half time.

In the second half, Osbaldiston managed a single off a 44-yard missed field goal. Four minutes later, Osbaldiston had another single on a 66-yard punt. On the final play of the third quarter, the Stamps capped a 14-play drive when Jeff Garcia ran in from the one for the touchdown to bring the Stampeders within one point of the Tiger-Cats with the score 18-17.

Aldi Henry intercepted a Danny McManus pass to give the Stamps possession at the 13:00 mark of the fourth quarter. The Stampeders were only able to convert a field goal out of the opportunity, but it was enough to give them the lead in the game again. McLoughlin kicked another field goal 5 minutes later to give the Stamps a 23-18 advantage. Archie Amerson made a terrific running play to take the ball to the two-yard line for the Ti-Cats. Williams ran in from the four, but the two point convert attempt failed, giving Hamilton a 24-23 lead with three minutes remaining. After a Calgary drive, place kicker Mark McLoughlin kicked the field goal on the last play of the game to give Calgary the win.

== Trivia ==
McLoughlin made three field goals in the fourth quarter and four altogether. Earlier in the year he had battled to gain his spot on the team. Jeff Garcia was named Grey Cup MVP, while Vince Danielsen was named Canadian MVP.

Rocco Romano won the Grey Cup in 1998 and rode a horse his jersey number was 59. Exactly 20 years later the Calgary Stampeders won the 2018 Grey Cup. Ja'Gared Davis rode a horse wearing the jersey number 95.

== 1998 CFL Playoffs ==
=== West Division ===
- Semi-final (November 8 @ Edmonton, Alberta) Edmonton Eskimos 40-33 BC Lions
- Final (November 15 @ Calgary, Alberta) Calgary Stampeders 33-10 Edmonton Eskimos

=== East Division ===
- Semi-final (November 8 @ Montreal, Quebec) Montreal Alouettes 41-28 Toronto Argonauts
- Final (November 15 @ Hamilton, Ontario) Hamilton Tiger-Cats 22-20 Montreal Alouettes
