= 1998 Montreal Alouettes season =

Canadian football team season

- Head coach: Dave Ritchie
- Home stadium: Molson Stadium

Results
- Record: 12–5–1
- Division place: 2nd, East
- Playoffs: Lost East Final

Uniform

The 1998 Montreal Alouettes finished in second place in the East Division with a 12–5–1 record. The Hamilton Tiger-Cats finished with the same record, but won the season series and thus, the tie-breaker. Hamilton also defeated the Alouettes in the East Final, denying the team a trip to the Grey Cup.

The 1998 season was significant with the signing of future all-time team passing leader Anthony Calvillo, the drafting of future Alouette touchdown leader Ben Cahoon, and longtime centre Bryan Chiu becoming a regular starter on the offensive line. Running back Mike Pringle became the first player to rush for over 2000 yards in a single season. The Alouettes also made a permanent move to Percival Molson Memorial Stadium on the campus of McGill University after dwindling attendance numbers at Olympic Stadium.

== Offseason ==
=== CFL draft ===
Round	Pick	Player	Position	School/Club team
1	6	Ben Cahoon	WR	Brigham Young
3	15	Scott Flory	OL	Saskatchewan
3	18	William Loftus	D	Manitoba
5	34	Yannic Sermanou	OL	McGill
6	41	Kelly Ireland	OL	St. Mary's

== Preseason ==
Game	Date	Opponent	Results		Venue	Attendance
Game	Date	Opponent	Score	Record	Venue	Attendance
A	June 18	at Toronto Argonauts	L 18–21	0–1	SkyDome	12,465
B	June 25	vs. Winnipeg Blue Bombers	W 44–18	1–1	Molson Stadium	11,752

== Regular season ==
=== Season standings ===
East Division
Pos	Team	Pld	W	L	T	PF	PA	PD	Pts
1	Hamilton Tiger-Cats (C, Q)	18	12	5	1	503	351	+152	25
2	Montreal Alouettes (Q)	18	12	5	1	470	435	+35	25
3	Toronto Argonauts (Q)	18	9	9	0	452	410	+42	18
4	Winnipeg Blue Bombers	18	3	15	0	399	588	−189	6

Source: "1998 CFL regular season standings". Archived from the original on 2009-07-29.
(C) First round bye; (Q) Qualified for playoffs

=== Season schedule ===
Week	Game	Date	Opponent	Results		Venue	Attendance
Week	Game	Date	Opponent	Score	Record	Venue	Attendance
1	1	July 1	at Winnipeg Blue Bombers	W 27–24	1–0	Winnipeg Stadium	22,013
2	2	July 9	vs. Saskatchewan Roughriders	W 30–24	2–0	Molson Stadium	14,388
3	3	July 16	at Calgary Stampeders	W 29–26	3–0	McMahon Stadium	27,515
4	4	July 23	vs. Hamilton Tiger-Cats	L 21–23	3–1	Molson Stadium	16,149
5	5	July 31	at Edmonton Eskimos	L 10–22	3–2	Commonwealth Stadium	30,813
6	6	Aug 6	vs. BC Lions	W 22–16	4–2	Molson Stadium	14,050
7	7	Aug 13	vs. Toronto Argonauts	W 24–20	5–2	Molson Stadium	16,399
8	8	Aug 21	at Saskatchewan Roughriders	W 13–12	6–2	Taylor Field	22,042
9	9	Aug 28	vs. Calgary Stampeders	W 40–32	7–2	Molson Stadium	17,501
10	10	Sept 5	at BC Lions	W 26–15	8–2	BC Place	14,408
11	11	Sept 13	vs. Hamilton Tiger-Cats	L 9–30	8–3	Molson Stadium	18,262
12	12	Sept 20	at Hamilton Tiger-Cats	T 31–31	8–3–1	Ivor Wynne Stadium	18,509
13	13	Sept 25	at Winnipeg Blue Bombers	L 23–34	8–4–1	Winnipeg Stadium	22,539
14	14	Oct 4	vs. Edmonton Eskimos	W 34–3	9–4–1	Molson Stadium	16,152
15	15	Oct 12	vs. Toronto Argonauts	L 13–40	9–5–1	Molson Stadium	16,268
16	16	Oct 17	at Toronto Argonauts	W 38–28	10–5–1	SkyDome	24,230
17	17	Oct 25	vs. Winnipeg Blue Bombers	W 58–44	11–5–1	Molson Stadium	16,205
18	18	Nov 1	at Hamilton Tiger-Cats	W 22–11	12–5–1	Ivor Wynne Stadium	20,025

== Roster ==
1998 Montreal Alouettes final roster
Quarterbacks: 13 Anthony Calvillo; 19 Lance Funderburk; 8 Tracy Ham; Running backs: 4 Thomas Haskins; 30 Bruno Heppell; 27 Mike Pringle; 22 Michael Soles; Receivers: 81 Chris Armstrong; 87 André Bolduc; 32 Ben Cahoon; 82 Jock Climie; 80 Mac Cody; 84 Tyree Davis	Offensive linemen: 68 Bryan Chiu C; 69 Ryan Coughlin G/T; 66 Neal Fort T; 53 Uzooma Okeke T; 65 Mike Sutherland G/C; 59 Pierre Vercheval G; Defensive linemen: 90 Swift Burch DE; 34 Steve Charbonneau DE; 75 Tom Hipsz NT; 56 Elfrid Payton DE; 94 Doug Petersen NT; Special teams: 10 Terry Baker K/P	Linebackers: 48 Brian Clark; 36 Bruce Dickson; 50 Rahsaan Giddings; 7 Tracy Gravely; 47 Stefen Reid; Defensive backs: 6 Hency Charles; 17 Doug Craft; 1 Tom Europe; 23 Torey Hunter; 31 Barron Miles; 21 Irvin Smith; 26 Mark Washington	Injured list: 69 Bob Beveridge T; 3 Mill Coleman WR; 44 LaCurtis Jones LB; 18 Will Loftus DB; 0 Harold Nash DB; 85 Marcus Wall WR; 39 Alan Wetmore FB; 2 Chris Wright WR; Italics indicate American player

== Playoffs ==
=== East Semi-Final ===
Team	Q1	Q2	Q3	Q4	Total
Toronto Argonauts	0	17	4	7	28
Montreal Alouettes	14	10	10	7	41

=== East Final ===
Team	Q1	Q2	Q3	Q4	Total
Montreal Alouettes	0	6	0	14	20
Hamilton Tiger-Cats	15	3	0	4	22

== Awards ==
=== 1998 CFL All-Star Selections ===
- Uzooma Okeke – Offensive Tackle
- Elfrid Payton – Defensive End
- Mike Pringle – Running Back
- Pierre Vercheval – Offensive Guard

=== 1998 CFL Eastern All-Star Selections ===
- Uzooma okeke – Offensive Tackle
- Elfrid payton – Defensive End
- Mike pringle – Running Back
- Pierre vercheval – Offensive Guard
