= 1998 BC Lions season =

Canadian football team season

- Owner: David Braley
- General manager: Adam Rita
- Head coach: Adam Rita; Greg Mohns
- Home stadium: BC Place Stadium

Results
- Record: 9–9
- Division place: 3rd, West
- Playoffs: Lost West semi-final

The 1998 BC Lions finished in third place in the West Division with a 9–9 record. After beginning the year 3-6, head coach and general manager Adam Rita stepped down as coach in order to focus on his GM duties. Greg Mohns replaced him and led the Lions to a 6-3 finish and a playoff berth. They appeared in the West semi-final, but lost to the Edmonton Eskimos.

== Offseason ==
=== CFL draft ===
| Round | Pick | Player | Position | School |
|---|---|---|---|---|
| 1 | 3 | Steve Hardin | T | Oregon |
| 2 | 9 | Ryan Thelwell | SB | Minnesota |
| 3 | 14 | Matt Kellett | K | Saskatchewan |
| 5 | 30 | Bernard Gravel | DB | Laval |
| 5 | 31 | Francesco Pepe-Esposito | LB | Laval |

== Preseason ==
| Week | Date | Opponent | Result | Record |
|---|---|---|---|---|
| A | June 17 | at Calgary Stampeders | L 6–32 | 0–1 |
| B | June 25 | vs. Saskatchewan Roughriders | W 24–18 | 1–1 |

== Regular season ==
=== Season standings ===
West Division
| Pos | Team | Pld | W | L | T | PF | PA | PD | Pts |
|---|---|---|---|---|---|---|---|---|---|
| 1 | Calgary Stampeders (C, Q) | 18 | 12 | 6 | 0 | 558 | 397 | +161 | 24 |
| 2 | Edmonton Eskimos (Q) | 18 | 9 | 9 | 0 | 396 | 450 | −54 | 18 |
| 3 | BC Lions (Q) | 18 | 9 | 9 | 0 | 394 | 427 | −33 | 18 |
| 4 | Saskatchewan Roughriders | 18 | 5 | 13 | 0 | 411 | 525 | −114 | 10 |

Source: "1998 CFL regular season standings". Archived from the original on 2009-07-29.
(C) First round bye; (Q) Qualified for playoffs

=== Season schedule ===
| Week | Date | Opponent | Result | Record |
|---|---|---|---|---|
| 1 | July 2 | vs. Edmonton Eskimos | L 12–20 | 0–1 |
| 2 | July 10 | at Edmonton Eskimos | L 10–15 | 0–2 |
| 3 | July 16 | vs. Toronto Argonauts | L 15–30 | 0–3 |
| 4 | July 24 | at Saskatchewan Roughriders | W 25–20 | 1–3 |
| 5 | July 30 | vs. Winnipeg Blue Bombers | W 20–13 | 2–3 |
| 6 | Aug 6 | at Montreal Alouettes | L 16–22 | 2–4 |
| 7 | Aug 14 | at Winnipeg Blue Bombers | W 24–22 | 3–4 |
| 8 | Aug 20 | vs. Calgary Stampeders | L 9–55 | 3–5 |
| 9 | Aug 27 | at Hamilton Tiger-Cats | L 8–18 | 3–6 |
| 10 | Sept 5 | vs. Montreal Alouettes | L 15–26 | 3–7 |
| 11 | Sept 12 | at Toronto Argonauts | L 28–37 | 3–8 |
| 12 | Sept 19 | vs. Edmonton Eskimos | L 21–27 | 3–9 |
| 13 | Sept 26 | vs. Hamilton Tiger-Cats | W 34–31 | 4–9 |
| 14 | Oct 4 | at Calgary Stampeders | W 22–11 | 5–9 |
| 15 | Oct 9 | vs. Saskatchewan Roughriders | W 31–14 | 6–9 |
| 16 | Oct 18 | at Edmonton Eskimos | W 31–7 | 7–9 |
| 17 | Oct 25 | at Saskatchewan Roughriders | W 42–37 | 8–9 |
| 18 | Oct 31 | vs. Calgary Stampeders | W 31–22 | 9–9 |

== Roster ==
1998 BC Lions final roster
| Quarterbacks: 9 Damon Allen; 8 Danny Barrett; 13 Khari Jones; Running backs: 32 Simon Baffoe; 29 Robert Drummond; 23 Juan Johnson; 28 Mark Nohra; Receivers: 20 Bret Anderson K; 2 Eddie Brown; 88 Sean Graham; 81 Rod Harris; 7 Alfred Jackson | Offensive linemen: 55 Doug Davies C/G; 64 Mo Elewonibi T; 61 Steve Hardin T; 63 Scott Hendrickson C; 68 Cory Mantyka G; 57 Dan Payne T; 60 Jamie Taras G; Defensive linemen: 92 Noah Cantor DT; 74 Dave Chaytors DT; 72 Johnny Scott DE; 91 Herman Smith DE | Linebackers: 50 Antonio Armstrong; 56 Daved Benefield; 44 DeWayne Knight; 3 Picasso Nelson; 39 Nick Richards; Defensive backs: 37 Mike Crumb; 10 Dave Donaldson; 12 Dale Joseph; 17 Bo Lewis; 19 Mustafah Muhammad; 26 Glenn Rogers; 16 Andre Strode | Special teams: 18 Hank Ilesic K; 5 Lui Passaglia K/P; Injured list: 46 Troy Alexander DT; 21 Jimmy Cunningham WR; 29 B. J. Gallis LB; 14 Rashid Gayle DB; 66 Mark Hatfield T/G; 83 Rocky Henry WR; 33 Kelly Lochbaum LB; 4 Damion Lyons DB; 96 Virgil Robertson LB; 22 Rafael Robinson DB; 1 Al Shipman SB; Italics indicate International player |

== Awards and records ==
- CFL's Most Outstanding Rookie Award – Steve Muhammad (DB)

=== 1998 CFL All-Stars ===
- OT – Moe Elewonibi, CFL All-Star
- DT – Johnny Scott, CFL All-Star
- CB – Steve Muhammad, CFL All-Star
- DS – Dale Joseph, CFL All-Star

=== Western Division All-Star Selections ===
- RB – Juan Johnson, Western All-Star
- OT – Moe Elewonibi, Western All-Star
- DT – Dave Chaytors, Western All-Star
- DT – Johnny Scott, Western All-Star
- CB – Steve Muhammad, Western All-Star
- DB – Glenn Rogers Jr., Western All-Star
- DS – Dale Joseph, Western All-Star
- K – Lui Passaglia, Western All-Star

=== 1998 Intergold CFLPA All-Stars ===
OG – Jamie Taras, Intergold CFLPA All-Star

== Playoffs ==
=== West semi-final ===
| Team | Q1 | Q2 | Q3 | Q4 | Total |
|---|---|---|---|---|---|
| Edmonton Eskimos | 4 | 20 | 2 | 14 | 40 |
| BC Lions | 3 | 7 | 15 | 8 | 33 |
