= 1998 Calgary Stampeders season =

Canadian football team season

- Owner: Sig Gutsche
- General manager: Wally Buono
- Head coach: Wally Buono
- Home stadium: McMahon Stadium

Results
- Record: 12–6
- Division place: 1st, West
- Playoffs: Won Grey Cup

Uniform

The 1998 Calgary Stampeders season was the 41st season for the team in the Canadian Football League (CFL) and their 64th overall. The Stampeders finished first in the West Division for the seventh time in nine seasons with a 12–6 record. The Stampeders defeated the Edmonton Eskimos in the West Final and then beat the Hamilton Tiger-Cats in the 86th Grey Cup in the first Grey Cup matchup between those two teams. Wally Buono completed his seventh season as the team's head coach and fifth as the general manager. It was the fourth Grey Cup victory in Stampeders history and Buono became the first head coach to win multiple Grey Cup championships for the franchise.

== Offseason ==
The 1998 CFL draft took place on April 7, 1998. The Stampeders had six selections in the six-round draft.

=== CFL draft ===
Rd	Pick	Player	Position	School
1	4	Marc Pilon	LB	Syracuse
2	10	Andre Arlain	SB	St. Francis Xavier
3	16	Harland Ah You	DL	Brigham Young
4	24	Aubrey Cummings	WR	Acadia
5	32	Gene Stahl	RB	Calgary
6	39	Jodi Bednarek	LB	Calgary

== Preseason ==
=== Schedule ===
Week	Date	Opponent	Result	Record
A	Wed, June 17	BC Lions	W 32–6	1–0
B	Thurs, June 23	at Edmonton Eskimos	W 26–23	2–0

== Regular season ==
=== Season standings ===
West Division
Pos	Team	Pld	W	L	T	PF	PA	PD	Pts
1	Calgary Stampeders (C, Q)	18	12	6	0	558	397	+161	24
2	Edmonton Eskimos (Q)	18	9	9	0	396	450	−54	18
3	BC Lions (Q)	18	9	9	0	394	427	−33	18
4	Saskatchewan Roughriders	18	5	13	0	411	525	−114	10

Source: "1998 CFL regular season standings". Archived from the original on 2009-07-29.
(C) First round bye; (Q) Qualified for playoffs

=== Season schedule ===
Game	Date	Opponent	Result	Record
1	Wed, July 1	vs. Hamilton Tiger-Cats	W 21–20	1–0
2	Thurs, July 9	at Toronto Argonauts	W 22–19	2–0
3	Thurs, July 16	vs. Montreal Alouettes	L 26–29	2–1
4	Fri, July 24	at Winnipeg Blue Bombers	W 44–25	3–1
5	Thurs, July 30	vs. Toronto Argonauts	L 14–15	3–2
6	Fri, Aug 7	at Saskatchewan Roughriders	W 46–27	4–2
7	Thurs, Aug 13	vs. Saskatchewan Roughriders	W 47–24	5–2
8	Thurs, Aug 20	at BC Lions	W 55–9	6–2
9	Fri, Aug 28	at Montreal Alouettes	L 32–40	6–3
10	Mon, Sept 7	vs. Edmonton Eskimos	W 26–8	7–3
11	Fri, Sept 11	at Edmonton Eskimos	W 30–23	8–3
12	Fri, Sept 18	vs. Saskatchewan Roughriders	W 35–18	9–3
13	Sun, Sept 27	at Saskatchewan Roughriders	L 22–27	9–4
14	Sun, Oct 4	vs. BC Lions	L 11–22	9–5
15	Sun, Oct 11	at Hamilton Tiger-Cats	W 35–18	10–5
16	Sun, Oct 18	vs. Winnipeg Blue Bombers	W 39–23	11–5
17	Sun, Oct 25	vs. Edmonton Eskimos	W 31–19	12–5
18	Sat, Oct 31	at BC Lions	L 22–31	12–6

== Awards and records ==
- Jeff Nicklin Memorial Trophy – Kelvin Anderson (RB)

=== 1998 CFL All-Stars ===
- QB – Jeff Garcia
- RB – Kelvin Anderson
- SB – Allen Pitts
- WR – Terry Vaughn
- OG – Fred Childress
- LB – Alondra Johnson
- P – Tony Martino

=== Western All-Star Selections ===
- QB – Jeff Garcia
- RB – Kelvin Anderson
- SB – Allen Pitts
- SB – Vince Danielsen
- WR – Terry Vaughn
- C – Jamie Crysdale
- OG – Fred Childress
- LB – Darryl Hall
- LB – Alondra Johnson
- CB – Marvin Coleman
- DB – Jack Kellogg
- P – Tony Martino
- ST – Marvin Coleman

== Post-season ==
=== Schedule ===
Game	Date	Opponent	Result	Record
West Semi-Final	Bye			
West Final	Sun, Nov 15	vs. Edmonton Eskimos	W 33–10	1–0
Grey Cup	Sun, Nov 22	Hamilton Tiger-Cats	W 26–24	2–0

=== Grey Cup ===
Team	Q1	Q2	Q3	Q4	Total
Hamilton Tiger-Cats	3	13	2	6	24
Calgary Stampeders	4	6	7	9	26

== Roster ==
1998 Calgary Stampeders final roster
Quarterbacks: 16 Henry Burris; 15 Dave Dickenson; 7 Jeff Garcia; Running backs: 32 Kelvin Anderson; 28 Farell Duclair; 34 Duane Forde; Receivers: 82 Andre Arlain; 87 Aubrey Cummings; 88 Vince Danielsen; 83 Travis Moore; 18 Allen Pitts; 2 Terry Vaughn	Offensive linemen: 68 Freddie Childress G; 67 Jamie Crysdale C; 62 Jung-Yul Kim G/T; 50 Jay McNeil G; 63 Rohn Meyer T; 59 Rocco Romano T; Defensive linemen: 92 Steve Anderson DT; 84 Ray Jacobs DT; 95 Jermaine Miles DE; 56 Shonte Peoples DE; 94 Jeff Traversy DT	Linebackers: 6 Jason Clemett; 4 Darryl Hall; 51 Alondra Johnson; 91 Henry Newby; 31 Roger Reinson; Defensive backs: 17 Marvin Coleman; 29 Eddie Davis; 12 Greg Frers; 21 William Hampton; 9 Aldi Henry; 3 Jackie Kellogg	Special teams: 11 Tony Martino P/K; 13 Mark McLoughlin K; Injured list: 44 Ray Biggs LB; 60 Bruce Covernton T; 8 Greg Knox DB; 41 Anthony McClanahan LB; 96 Bronzell Miller DE; 14 Dave Van Belleghem DB; Italics indicate International player
