= 1998 Winnipeg Blue Bombers season =

Canadian football team season

- General manager: Jeff Reinebold
- Head coach: Jeff Reinebold
- Home stadium: Winnipeg Stadium

Results
- Record: 3–15
- Division place: 4th, East
- Playoffs: did not qualify

Uniform

The 1998 Winnipeg Blue Bombers finished in fourth place in the East Division with a 3–15 record and failed to make the playoffs.

== Offseason ==
=== CFL draft ===
Round	Pick	Player	Position	School
4	22	Garrett Sutherland	LB	Northern Illinois
4	23	Jean Daniel Roy	DL	Ottawa
4	26	Eddie Williams	WR	Southwest Minnesota State
6	37	John Baunemann	K	Manitoba
6	38	Chad Vath	LB	Manitoba

== Regular season ==
=== Season standings ===
East Division
Pos	Team	Pld	W	L	T	PF	PA	PD	Pts
1	Hamilton Tiger-Cats (C, Q)	18	12	5	1	503	351	+152	25
2	Montreal Alouettes (Q)	18	12	5	1	470	435	+35	25
3	Toronto Argonauts (Q)	18	9	9	0	452	410	+42	18
4	Winnipeg Blue Bombers	18	3	15	0	399	588	−189	6

Source: "1998 CFL regular season standings". Archived from the original on 2009-07-29.
(C) First round bye; (Q) Qualified for playoffs

=== Season schedule ===
Week	Game	Date	Opponent	Results		Venue	Attendance
Week	Game	Date	Opponent	Score	Record	Venue	Attendance
1	July 1	vs. Montreal Alouettes	L 24–27	0–1			
2	July 8	at Hamilton Tiger-Cats	L 13–33	0–2			
3	July 17	vs. Hamilton Tiger-Cats	L 7–29	0–3			
4	July 24	vs. Calgary Stampeders	L 25–44	0–4			
5	July 30	at BC Lions	L 13–20	0–5			
6	Aug 6	at Toronto Argonauts	L 14–29	0–6			
7	Aug 14	vs. BC Lions	L 22–24	0–7			
8	Aug 21	at Edmonton Eskimos	L 16–25	0–8			
9	Aug 27	vs. Toronto Argonauts	L 16–37	0–9			
10	Sept 6	at Saskatchewan Roughriders	L 18–32	0–10			
11	Sept 13	vs. Saskatchewan Roughriders	W 36–35	1–10			
12	Sept 19	at Toronto Argonauts	L 22–46	1–11			
13	Sept 25	vs. Montreal Alouettes	W 34–23	2–11			
14	Oct 4	at Hamilton Tiger-Cats	L 21–35	2–12			
15	Oct 12	vs. Edmonton Eskimos	L 20–40	2–13			
16	Oct 18	at Calgary Stampeders	L 23–39	2–14			
17	Oct 25	at Montreal Alouettes	L 44–58	2–15			
18	Oct 30	vs. Toronto Argonauts	W 31–12	3–15			

== Roster ==
1998 Winnipeg Blue Bombers final roster
Quarterbacks: 16 Troy Kopp; 8 Jay Walker; Running backs: 21 Eric Blount; 20 Deland McCullough; 25 Sean Millington; Receivers: 82 Travis Anderson; 14 Bruce Boyko; 5 Matt DuBuc; 18 Spencer McLennan; 81 Mitch Running; 85 Milt Stegall	Offensive linemen: 65 Sandy Annunziata G; 58 Todd Furdyk T; 59 Craig Hendrickson G; 62 Chris Perez T; 60 Dave Vankoughnett C; Defensive linemen: 76 Joe Fleming DT; 90 Rob Robinson DT; 91 Tyrone Rodgers DE; 72 Glen Scrivener DE/DT; 99 Wayne Weathers DE; Special teams: 6 Bob Cameron P; 7 Troy Westwood K	Linebackers: 51 Grant Carter; 27 Paul Girodo; 24 Maurice Kelly; 52 Wesley Leasy; 31 David Maeva; 54 Wade Miller; Defensive backs: 30 Bryce Bevill; 26 Reggie Carthon; 1 Brad Elberg; 33 Nick Ferguson; 3 Brandon Hamilton; 22 John Kalin; 29 Don Robinson	Injured list: 34 Greg Battle LB; 19 Victor Bryan DB; 48 Aaron Collins LB; 9 David Gamble WR; 38 Doug Hocking LB; 80 Pat McNerney FB; 66 Mike Mihelic G; 94 Jean-Daniel Roy DE; 68 Derek Sholdice G; 87 Mike Trevathan SB; 39 Jason Van Geel LB; Italics indicate American player

== Awards and records ==
- CFLPA's Most Outstanding Community Service Award – Glen Scrivener (DT)

=== 1998 CFL All-Stars ===
- ST – Eric Blount, CFL All-Star
- DT – Joe Fleming, CFL All-Star

=== Eastern All-Star Selections ===
- OT – Chris Perez, CFL Eastern All-Star
- ST – Eric Blount, CFL Eastern All-Star
- DT – Joe Fleming, CFL Eastern All-Star
- DT – Doug Petersen, CFL Eastern All-Star
- LB – Grant Carter, CFL Eastern All-Star
