= 1998 Hamilton Tiger-Cats season =

Season of Canadian Football League team the Hamilton Tiger-Cats

- Head coach: Ron Lancaster
- Home stadium: Ivor Wynne Stadium

Results
- Record: 12–5–1
- Division place: 1st, East
- Playoffs: Lost Grey Cup
- Team MOP: Danny McManus
- Team MOC: Mike Morreale
- Team MOR: Seth Dittman

The 1998 Hamilton Tiger-Cats season was the 41st season for the team in the Canadian Football League (CFL) and their 49th overall. The Tiger-Cats finished in first place in the East Division for the first time since 1989, when they last appeared in the Grey Cup, with a 12–5–1 record. They appeared in the Grey Cup where they lost to the Stampeders.

== Offseason ==
=== CFL draft ===
Rd	Pick	Player	Position	School
1	1	Tim Fleiszer	DL	Harvard
3	13	Devin Grant	OL	Utah
4	21	Tarek Jayoussi	WR	Calgary
5	29	Jeff Brown	CB	Acadia
6	36	Benjie Hutchison	DL	British Columbia
6	43	Robert Yelenich	LB	York

== Preseason ==
Week	Date	Opponent	Results		Venue	Attendance
Week	Date	Opponent	Score	Record	Venue	Attendance
A	June 18	at Winnipeg Blue Bombers	L 9–17	0–1		
B	June 24	vs. Toronto Argonauts	L 14–22	0–2		

== Regular season ==
=== Season standings ===
East Division
Pos	Team	Pld	W	L	T	PF	PA	PD	Pts
1	Hamilton Tiger-Cats (C, Q)	18	12	5	1	503	351	+152	25
2	Montreal Alouettes (Q)	18	12	5	1	470	435	+35	25
3	Toronto Argonauts (Q)	18	9	9	0	452	410	+42	18
4	Winnipeg Blue Bombers	18	3	15	0	399	588	−189	6

Source: "1998 CFL regular season standings". Archived from the original on 2009-07-29.
(C) First round bye; (Q) Qualified for playoffs

=== Schedule ===
Week	Game	Date	Opponent	Results		Venue	Attendance
Week	Game	Date	Opponent	Score	Record	Venue	Attendance
1	1	July 1	at Calgary Stampeders	L 20–21	0–1		
2	2	July 8	vs. Winnipeg Blue Bombers	W 33–13	1–1		
3	3	July 17	at Winnipeg Blue Bombers	W 29–7	2–1		
4	4	July 23	at Montreal Alouettes	W 23–21	3–1		
5	5	July 30	vs. Saskatchewan Roughriders	W 26–8	4–1		
6	6	Aug 7	at Edmonton Eskimos	W 39–10	5–1		
7	7	Aug 13	vs. Edmonton Eskimos	W 48–23	6–1		
8	8	Aug 20	at Toronto Argonauts	L 6–42	6–2		
9	9	Aug 27	vs. BC Lions	W 28–8	7–2		
10	10	Sept 7	vs. Toronto Argonauts	W 26–7	8–2		
11	11	Sept 13	at Montreal Alouettes	W 30–9	9–2		
12	12	Sept 20	vs. Montreal Alouettes	T 31–31	9–2–1		
13	13	Sept 27	at BC Lions	L 31–34	9–3–1		
14	14	Oct 4	vs. Winnipeg Blue Bombers	W 35–21	10–3–1		
15	15	Oct 11	vs. Calgary Stampeders	L 18–35	10–4–1		
16	16	Oct 16	at Saskatchewan Roughriders	W 34–31	11–4–1		
17	17	Oct 23	at Toronto Argonauts	W 45–8	12–4–1		
18	18	Nov 1	vs. Montreal Alouettes	L 11–22	12–5–1		

== Postseason ==
Round	Date	Opponent	Results		Venue	Attendance
Round	Date	Opponent	Score	Record	Venue	Attendance
East Final	Nov 15	vs. Montreal Alouettes	W 22–20	1–0		
Grey Cup	Nov 22	vs. Calgary Stampeders	L 24–26	1–1		

=== Grey Cup ===
Team	Q1	Q2	Q3	Q4	Total
Hamilton Tiger-Cats	3	13	2	6	24
Calgary Stampeders	4	6	7	9	26

== Roster ==
1998 Hamilton Tiger-Cats final roster
Quarterbacks: 11 Cody Ledbetter; 14 Danny McManus; 12 T. J. Rubley; Running backs: 9 Archie Amerson; 35 Dan Pronyk; 34 Jarrett Smith; 24 Ronald Williams; Receivers: 82 Darren Flutie; 89 Andrew Grigg; 18 Mike Morreale; 86 Trevor Shaw	Offensive linemen: 55 Chris Burns G; 51 Carl Coulter C; 64 Seth Dittman T; 68 Dave Hack T; 62 Tim Prinsen T/G; 58 Frank Rocca G/C; 57 Val St. Germain G; Defensive linemen: 95 Tim Fleiszer DT; 90 Gonzalo Floyd DE; 53 Joe Montford DE; 77 Mike Philbrick DT; 94 Obie Spanic DT; 92 Willie Whitehead DE	Linebackers: 38 Cooper Harris; 45 Lamar McGriggs; 36 Justin Ring; 73 Calvin Tiggle; Defensive backs: 2 Eric Carter; 20 Derek Grier; 42 Rob Hitchcock; 22 Orlondo Steinauer; 39 Gerald Vaughn; 7 Kyle Walters; 28 Frank West	Special teams: 3 Paul Osbaldiston K/P; Injured list: 99 Jeff Cummins DT; 15 Joe Hagins LB; 17 Tarek Jayoussi WR; 4 Reggie Love DB; 88 Bobby Olive WR; 50 Joe Rumolo DT; Italics indicate American players
