= Arek =

Arek is a given name for males.

Arek may also refer to:

- Arek Bigos (born 1973), Polish player of Canadian football
- Arek, is a deity character in the Lufia series II of console role-playing game
- Arek Monthly, an Armenian Egyptian periodical in Arabic
