= 1998 Saskatchewan Roughriders season =

CFL team season

- General manager: Alan Ford
- Head coach: Jim Daley
- Home stadium: Taylor Field

Results
- Record: 5–13
- Division place: 4th, West
- Playoffs: did not qualify
- Team MOP: Reggie Slack
- Team MOC: Dan Rashovich
- Team MOR: Mario Smith

The 1998 Saskatchewan Roughriders finished in fourth place in the West Division 1998 CFL season with a 5–13 record and missed the playoffs, failing to return to the Grey Cup game.

== Offseason ==
=== CFL draft ===
Round	Pick	Player	Position	School/Club team
1	7	Curtis Galick	Defensive back	British Columbia
2	8	Ousmane Tounkara	Wide receiver	Ottawa
3	19	Kevin Pressburger	Linebacker	Waterloo
4	27	Jason Van Geel	Linebacker	Waterloo
6	42	James Repesse	Linebacker	Saskatchewan

=== Preseason ===
Week	Date	Opponent	Score	Result	Attendance
A	Fri, June 19	vs. Edmonton Eskimos	22–3	Loss	10,000
B	Thurs, June 25	at BC Lions	24–18	Loss	11,376

== Regular season ==
=== Season standings ===
West Division
Pos	Team	Pld	W	L	T	PF	PA	PD	Pts
1	Calgary Stampeders (C, Q)	18	12	6	0	558	397	+161	24
2	Edmonton Eskimos (Q)	18	9	9	0	396	450	−54	18
3	BC Lions (Q)	18	9	9	0	394	427	−33	18
4	Saskatchewan Roughriders	18	5	13	0	411	525	−114	10

Source: "1998 CFL regular season standings". Archived from the original on 2009-07-29.
(C) First round bye; (Q) Qualified for playoffs

=== Season schedule ===
Week	Date	Opponent	Score	Result	Attendance	Record
1	Fri, July 3	vs. Toronto Argonauts	W 19–10	1–0		21,714
2	Thur, July 9	at Montreal Alouettes	L 24–30	1–1		14,388
3	Thur, July 16	vs. Edmonton Eskimos	W 28–14	2–1		21,686
4	Fri, July 24	vs. BC Lions	L 20–25	2–2		25,055
5	Thurs, July 30	at Hamilton Tiger-Cats	L 8–26	2–3		18,276
6	Fri, Aug 7	vs. Calgary Stampeders	L 27–46	2–4		22,588
7	Thur, Aug 13	at Calgary Stampeders	L 24–47	2–5		31,507
8	Fri, Aug 21	vs. Montreal Alouettes	L 12–13	2–6		22,042
9	Thur, Aug 27	at Edmonton Eskimos	L 13–35	2–7		31,894
10	Sun, Sept 6	vs. Winnipeg Blue Bombers	W 32–18	3–7		30,152
11	Sun, Sept 13	at Winnipeg Blue Bombers	L 35–36	3–8		23,726
12	Fri, Sept 18	at Calgary Stampeders	L 18–35	3–9		30,633
13	Sun, Sept 27	vs. Calgary Stampeders	W 27–22	4–9		26,145
14	Sat, Oct 3	at Toronto Argonauts	W 18–15	5–9		15,272
15	Fri, Oct 9	at BC Lions	L 14–31	5–10		22,465
16	Fri, Oct 16	vs. Hamilton Tiger-Cats	L 31–34	5–11		21,893
17	Sun, Oct 25	vs. BC Lions	L 37–42	5–12		26,537
18	Sun, Nov 1	at Edmonton Eskimos	L 24–46	5–13		28,470

== Roster ==
1998 Saskatchewan Roughriders final roster
Quarterbacks: 7 Heath Rylance; 12 Steve Sarkisian; 17 Reggie Slack; Running backs: 35 Shawn Daniels; 20 Darren Joseph; 19 Mike Maurer; 32 Mike Saunders; 33 Chris Szarka; Receivers: 6 Dexter Dawson; 10 Dan Farthing; 80 Don Narcisse; 84 Larry Thompson; 35 Rick Walters	Offensive linemen: 67 Dan Comiskey G; 52 Ben Fairbrother G; 50 Rob Lazeo G; 60 Gene Makowsky T; 59 James Monroe C; 51 John Terry T; Defensive linemen: 99 Ernie Brown DT; 98 DeWayne Patterson DE; 72 Colin Scrivener DT; 93 Andrew Stewart DE; 91 Nelson Van Waes DT; Special teams: 4 Paul McCallum K/P	Linebackers: 37 Ken Benson; 53 Larry McSeed; 74 Dan Rashovich; 45 Randy Srochenski LS; Defensive backs: 24 Ventson Donelson; 25 Curtis Galick; 16 Shannon Garrett; 3 Tommy Henry; 9 Todd McMillon; 22 Mario Smith; 13 Eric Sutton; 2 Terryl Ulmer	Injured list: 47 Dion Foxx LB; 1 Profail Grier RB; 89 Curtis Mayfield SB; 41 Gary Rogers LB; 42 Darnell Small LB; 62 Vic Stevenson T; 88 Ousmane Tounkara WR; 43 R-Kal Truluck DE; Italics indicate American player

== Awards and records ==
=== CFL All-Star Selections ===
- Donald Narcisse, Wide Receiver
- John Terry, Offensive Tackle

=== Western All-Star Selections ===
- Donald Narcisse, Wide Receiver
- John Terry, Offensive Tackle
