= 1998 Toronto Argonauts season =

CFL team season

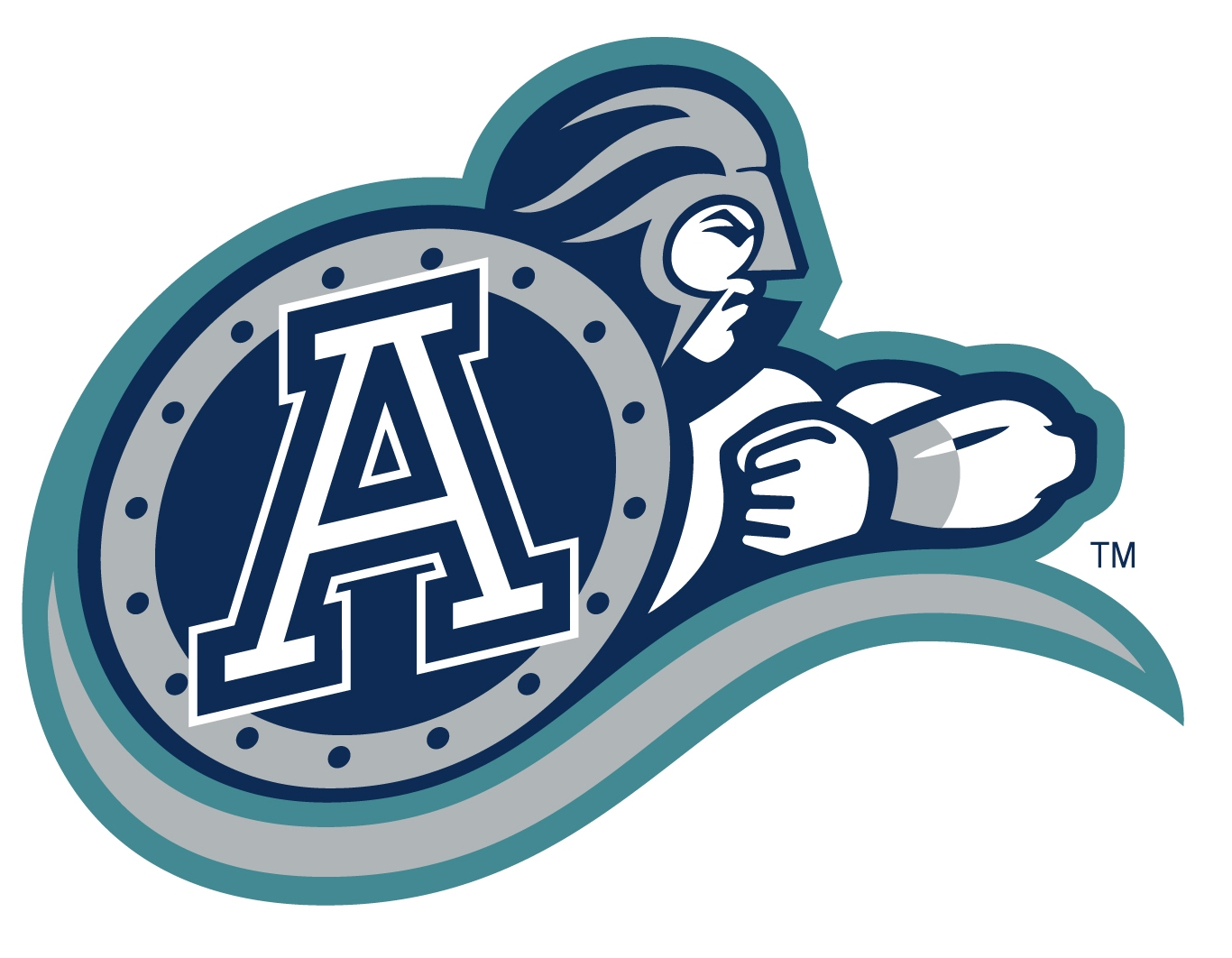
- Head coach: Don Matthews
- Home stadium: SkyDome

Results
- Record: 9–9
- Division place: 3rd, East
- Playoffs: Lost Division Semi-Final

The 1998 Toronto Argonauts finished in third place in the East Division of the 1998 CFL season with a 9–9 record and lost the East Division Semi-Finals.

== Offseason ==
=== CFL draft ===
Rd	Pick	Player	Position	School
1	2	Dave Miller-Johnston	P/K	Concordia
2	12	Roger Dunbrack	DL	Western
3	20	Jermaine Brown	RB	Winona State
4	28	Brian Mlachak	K	Calgary
5	35	Eric Shilts	WR	Toronto
6	43	Bill Mitoulas	LB	Notre Dame

=== Preseason ===
Game	Date	Opponent	Results		Venue	Attendance
Game	Date	Opponent	Score	Record	Venue	Attendance
A	June 18	vs. Montreal Alouettes	W 21–18	1–0	SkyDome	12,645
B	June 24	at Hamilton Tiger-Cats	W 22–14	2–0	Ivor Wynne Stadium	14,675

== Regular season ==
=== Season standings ===
East Division
Pos	Team	Pld	W	L	T	PF	PA	PD	Pts
1	Hamilton Tiger-Cats (C, Q)	18	12	5	1	503	351	+152	25
2	Montreal Alouettes (Q)	18	12	5	1	470	435	+35	25
3	Toronto Argonauts (Q)	18	9	9	0	452	410	+42	18
4	Winnipeg Blue Bombers	18	3	15	0	399	588	−189	6

Source: "1998 CFL regular season standings". Archived from the original on 2009-07-29.
(C) First round bye; (Q) Qualified for playoffs

=== Regular season ===
Week	Date	Opponent	Results		Venue	Attendance
Week	Date	Opponent	Score	Record	Venue	Attendance
1	July 3	at Saskatchewan Roughriders	L 10–19	0–1	Taylor Field	21,714
2	July 9	vs. Calgary Stampeders	L 19–22	0–2	SkyDome	15,672
3	July 16	at BC Lions	W 30–15	1–2	BC Place	15,725
4	July 23	vs. Edmonton Eskimos	L 27–30 (OT)	1–3	SkyDome	15,106
5	July 30	at Calgary Stampeders	W 15–14	2–3	McMahon Stadium	26,061
6	August 6	vs. Winnipeg Blue Bombers	W 29–14	3–3	SkyDome	15,712
7	August 13	at Montreal Alouettes	L 20–24	3–4	Molson Stadium	16,399
8	August 20	vs. Hamilton Tiger-Cats	W 42–6	4–4	SkyDome	23,368
9	August 27	at Winnipeg Blue Bombers	W 37–16	5–4	Winnipeg Stadium	20,102
10	September 7	at Hamilton Tiger-Cats	L 7–26	5–5	Ivor Wynne Stadium	30,065
11	September 12	vs. BC Lions	W 37–28	6–5	SkyDome	14,218
12	September 19	Winnipeg Blue Bombers	W 46–22	7–5	SkyDome	13,894
13	September 26	at Edmonton Eskimos	W 30–29	8–5	Commonwealth Stadium	31,923
14	October 3	Saskatchewan Roughriders	L 15–18	8–6	SkyDome	15,272
15	October 12	at Montreal Alouettes	W 40–13	9–6	Molson Stadium	16,268
16	October 17	vs. Montreal Alouettes	L 28–38	9–7	SkyDome	24,230
17	October 23	vs. Hamilton Tiger-Cats	L 8–45	9–8	SkyDome	32,717
18	October 30	at Winnipeg Blue Bombers	L 12–31	9–9	Winnipeg Stadium	33,810

== Postseason ==
Round	Date	Opponent	Results		Venue	Attendance
Round	Date	Opponent	Score	Record	Venue	Attendance
East Semi-Final	November 8	at Montreal Alouettes	L 28–41	0–1	Molson Stadium	17,495

== Roster ==
1998 Toronto Argonauts final roster
Quarterbacks: 7 Jay Barker; 12 Kerwin Bell; 17 Nealon Greene; Running backs: 31 Michael Clemons; 29 Tony Smith; Receivers: 84 Andre Batson; 28 Duane Dmytryshyn; 8 Andrew English; 81 Andre Kirwan; 88 Paul Masotti; 87 Derrell Mitchell; 82 Nigel Williams	Offensive linemen: 56 Chad Folk C; 58 Chris Gioskos G; 62 Dwayne Morgan T; 54 Jeremy O'Day T; 66 Jude St. John G; 65 Willie Williams T; Defensive linemen: 73 Roger Dunbrack DE; 99 Jermaine Haley DT; 91 Demetrious Maxie DE/DT; 94 Toddrick McIntosh DT; 41 John Raposo DE; Special teams: 5 Carlos Huerta K; 1 Noel Prefontaine K/P	Linebackers: 27 Eric Johnson; 97 Maurice Miller; 50 Mike O'Shea; 35 Brendan Rogers; 59 Glen Young; Defensive backs: 10 Antonious Bonner; 21 George Nimako; 9 Marcello Simmons; 12 Adrion Smith; 19 Donald Smith; 36 Les Smith; 26 Kelly Wiltshire	Injured list: 16 Byron Capers DB; 24 Kato Hitson RB; 68 Steve Salter G; Italics indicate International player

== Awards and records ==
=== 1998 CFL All-Stars ===
- SB – Derrell Mitchell

=== Eastern Division All-Star Selections ===
- QB – Kerwin Bell
- SB – Derrell Mitchell
- WR – Paul Masotti
- LB – Kelly Wiltshire
- CB – Donald Smith
- DS – Lester Smith
- P – Noel Prefontaine
