= Roger Dunbrack =

Canadian football player

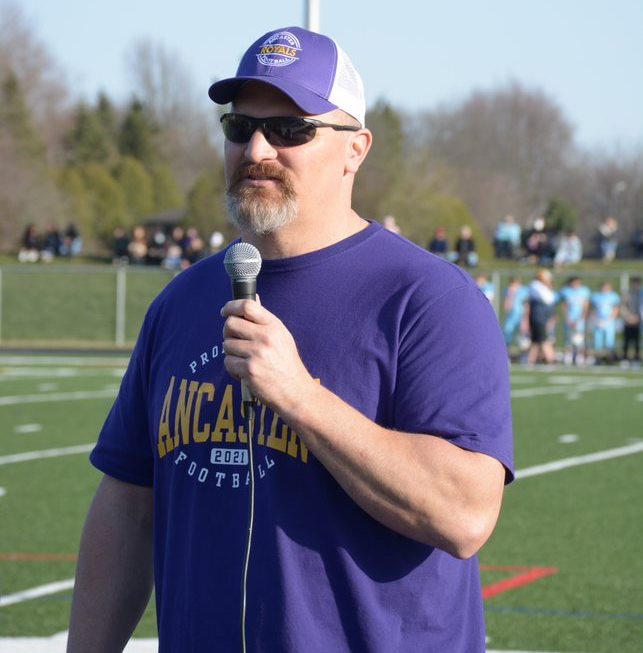
- Dunbrack as the head coach of the Ancaster Royals

No. 73, 70, 78
- Position: Defensive lineman

Personal information
- Born: October 8, 1975 (age 51); Hamilton, Ontario
- Listed height: 6 ft 4 in (1.93 m)
- Listed weight: 245 lb (111 kg)

Career information
- University: Western Ontario
- CFL draft: 1998: 2nd round, 12th overall pick

Career history

Playing
- Toronto Argonauts (1998–2002); Ottawa Renegades (2003–2004); Hamilton Tiger-Cats (2005–2007)

Coaching
- Hamilton Tiger-Cats (2008–2010) Strength and conditioning coach; McMaster (2011-2012) Defensive line coach; Ancaster Royals (2021-present) Head coach

Awards and highlights
- 2x CIAU First-Team All-Canadian (1996, 1997); 2x OUAA First-Team All-Star (1996, 1997)

Career CFL statistics
- Tackles: 146
- Quarterback sacks: 32
- Interceptions: 3

Roger Dunbrack (born October 8, 1975) is a football coach and a retired Canadian Football League player. He spent his 10-year career as a defensive lineman for the Toronto Argonauts, the now defunct Ottawa Renegades and the Hamilton Tiger-Cats. He has since coached football at the high school, university and professional level.

== Football career ==
After playing high school football in grade 11, Dunbrack attended a tryout for the CJFL's Hamilton Hurricanes after accepting an invitation from his cousin on a whim. He would later be honored as an inductee to the Hamilton Hurricanes Hall of Fame for his later success in the sport.

Dunbrack attended the University of Western Ontario and played for the Western Mustangs for 4 years, wearing number 55. During his first year, the Mustangs won the 30th Vanier Cup in 1994 by defeating the Saskatchewan Huskies 50–40 in overtime. Dunbrack was an OUAA First-Team All-Star in 1996 and 1997, and he was named to the CIAU Football All-Canadian Team in both years. He is now considered as "A Mustangs Legend".

Dunbrack was drafted 12th over by the Toronto Argonauts in the 1998 CFL Draft. He was released from the Argonauts by departing Head Coach Don Matthews after his first season, but GM Eric Tillman suspected that Matthews had done this so he could sign him to the Edmonton Eskimos, so he subsequently resigned Dunbrack with the Argonauts.

In week 15 of 2004, Dunbrack suffered a bicep injury against the Saskatchewan Roughriders, ending his season.

On March 16, 2005, Dunbrack signed a 2-year deal with the Hamilton Tiger-Cats After spending a third year with the team, Dunbrack was released in the 2008 offseason.

=== CFL Statistics ===
Year	Team	Games	Tackles				Fumbles			Interceptions		
Year	Team	Games	Comb	Def	ST	Sack	FF	FR	Yds	PD	Int	Yds
1998	TOR	13	5	2	3	1.0	0	0	0	1	0	0
1999	TOR	15	12	12	0	5.0	1	1	0	0	0	0
2000	TOR	18	24	21	3	9.0	2	0	0	1	0	0
2001	TOR	17	15	13	2	3.0	1	0	0	0	0	0
2002	TOR	18	26	26	0	2.0	0	2	18	2	1	0
2003	OTT	17	16	16	0	2.0	2	1	0	1	0	0
2004	OTT	14	13	12	1	5.0	0	0	0	2	1	2
2005	HAM	18	18	17	1	0.0	0	0	0	0	0	0
2006	HAM	11	7	7	0	3.0	0	0	0	0	1	0
2007	HAM	10	10	10	0	2.0	0	1	0	0	0	0
CFL career		151	146	136	10	32.0	6	5	18	7	3	2

== Other Ventures ==
In 2001, Dunbrack appeared in the film The Sum of All Fears along with other Toronto Argonaut and Montreal Alouette players. He portrayed number 51 on defense.

Following his retirement from the CFL, Dunbrack had coached several football camps, and also became a personal trainer under Phoenix Fitness Clubs in Stoney Creek. Dunbrack also became a teacher, jumping from different schools under the HWDSB.

=== Coaching career ===
Following his retirement, Dunbrack was hired by the Tiger-Cats to be their Strength and Conditioning Coach. In 2011, he joined the McMaster Marauders football program as the Defensive Line Coach under head coach Stefan Ptaszek, a former Argonauts teammate. In his first year with the team, the Marauders won the 47th Vanier Cup by defeating Laval Rouge et Or 41–38 in double overtime. Coincidentally, Dunbrack has been a member of the only two teams to win the Vanier Cup in overtime, and both wins were accomplished in his first year with each team.

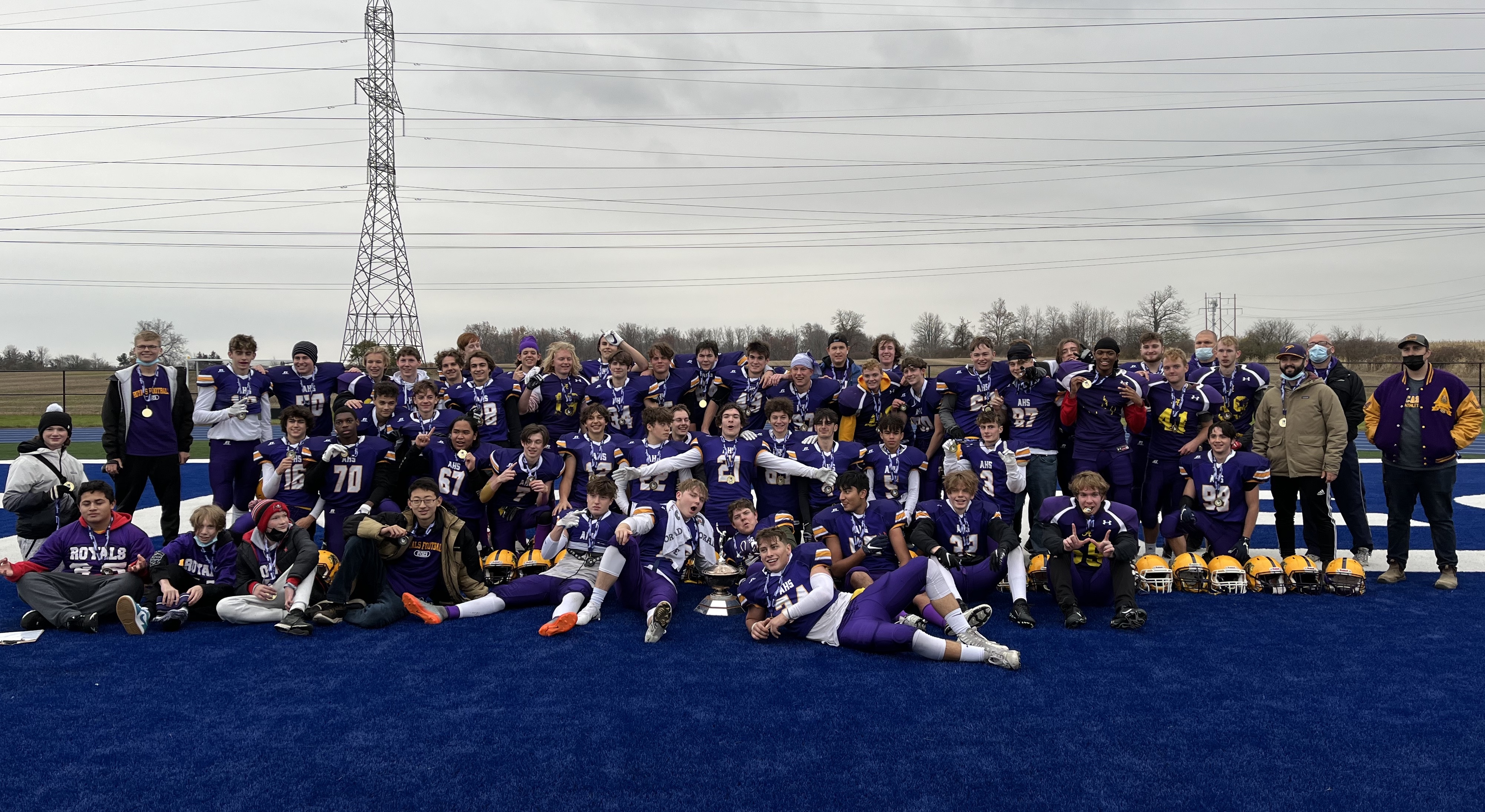
The championship photo of Dunbrack's first team as head coach

In the 2019 Spring season, Dunbrack worked as part of the coaching staff for the combined Delta/Sir John A. Macdonald high school football team. After the closing of Delta Secondary School and Sir John A. Macdonald Secondary School, Dunbrack followed the subsequent student amalgamation to Bernie Custis Secondary School and became part of the coaching staff for their brand new football team. Dunbrack also suggested a concept for safe contact practices which any junior football team under HWDSB could participate in. The concept was later enacted after multiple high school coaches collaborated to develop the idea.

In 2021, Dunbrack became the head coach for the Ancaster High Royals football team, who hadn't run their football program since 2017. Dunbrack and his coaching staff privately decided not to cut any players due to the expectancy of a low student turnout. To their surprise, more than 60 different students showed up to the tryouts, with 55 players ultimately getting jersey numbers assigned on the team roster. In the team's first season back, the Royals won the Chayka Bowl against the Glendale Bears, claiming the Division II championship.

== Notes ==
1. Dunbrack actually told me this.
