= Ah You =

Ah You is a surname. Notable people with the surname include:

- Harland Ah You (born 1972), American football player
- Junior Ah You (born 1948), American and Canadian football player
- C. J. Ah You (born 1982), American football player
- Rodney Ah You (born 1988), New Zealand Rugby Union player
