= Sir John A. Macdonald Secondary School =

Sir John A. Macdonald Secondary School can mean:

- Sir John A. Macdonald Secondary School (Hamilton, Ontario)
- Sir John A. Macdonald Secondary School (Waterloo, Ontario)
