= 1995 CFL draft =

Canadian football draft

The 1995 CFL draft composed of seven rounds and 55 Canadian football players that were chosen from eligible Canadian universities as well as Canadian players playing in the NCAA. The first eight picks of the draft were part of a "bonus round" awarded to teams who had complied with the Competitive Expenditure Cap. The following round, consisting of picks 9–16, was the regular first round of the draft.

== Bonus round ==
| = CFL Division All-Star | = CFL All-Star | = Hall of Famer |

| Pick # | CFL team | Player | Position | School |
|---|---|---|---|---|
| 1 | Hamilton Tiger-Cats | Tom Nütten | OL | Western Michigan |
| 2 | Ottawa Rough Riders | Stefen Reid | LB | Boise State |
| 3 | Toronto Argonauts | Mark Montreuil | DB | Concordia |
| 4 | Saskatchewan Roughriders | Troy Alexander | LB | Eastern Washington |
| 5 | Edmonton Eskimos | Hicham El-Mashtoub | C | Arizona |
| 6 | Winnipeg Blue Bombers | Seab Graham | SB | British Columbia |
| 7 | Calgary Stampeders | Kevin Reid | WR | Guelph |
| 8 | BC Lions | Mark Hatfield | OL | Bishop's |

== Round one ==
| = CFL Division All-Star | = CFL All-Star | = Hall of Famer |

| Pick # | CFL team | Player | Position | School |
|---|---|---|---|---|
| 9 | Hamilton | John Murphy | OL | Morningside College |
| 10 | Saskatchewan | Dwayne Provo | DB | Saint Mary's |
| 11 | Toronto | Sheldon Benoit | LB | Western Kentucky |
| 12 | Saskatchewan | Rob Lazeo | OT | Western Illinois |
| 13 | Edmonton | Mark Lawson | DB/LB | Western Ontario |
| 14 | Winnipeg | Jason Mallett | DB | Carleton |
| 15 | Calgary | Steve Mattison | FB | Illinois |
| 16 | BC | Brian Conlan | OT | British Columbia |

== Round two ==
| = CFL Division All-Star | = CFL All-Star | = Hall of Famer |

| Pick # | CFL team | Player | Position | School |
|---|---|---|---|---|
| 17 | Hamilton Tiger-Cats | Rob Hitchcock | LB | Weber State |
| 18 | Ottawa Rough Riders | Stewart Masi | G | Western Michigan |
| 19 | Toronto Argonauts | Frank Jones | WR | Missouri |
| 20 | Hamilton Eskimos | Jude St. John | OL | Western Ontario |
| 21 | Edmonton Eskimos | Derrick Sholdice | OT | Northern Illinois |
| 22 | Winnipeg Blue Bombers | Ante Skorput | G | Michigan |
| 23 | Saskatchewan Roughriders | Gene Makowsky | OL | Saskatchewan |
| 24 | Saskatchewan Roughriders | Brian Yorston | DT | Middle Tennessee |

== Round three ==
| Pick # | CFL team | Player | Position | School |
|---|---|---|---|---|
| 25 | Ottawa | Keith Hiscock | G | Simon Fraser |
| 26 | Toronto | Sean Ralph | RB | Ottawa |
| 27 | Ottawa | Heron Tait | DB | Guelph |
| 28 | Edmonton | Blake Bunting | TE | Evangel College |
| 29 | Winnipeg | Peter Pejovic | OT | Simon Fraser |
| 30 | Calgary | Ryan Hudecki | RB | McMaster |
| 31 | Ottawa | Steve Sarty | WR | Saint Mary's |

== Round four ==
| = CFL Division All-Star | = CFL All-Star | = Hall of Famer |

| Pick # | CFL team | Player | Position | School |
|---|---|---|---|---|
| 32 | Hamilton Tiger-Cats | Charles Assman | DB | Guelph |
| 33 | Ottawa Rough Riders | Glen Fowles | OT | Willamette |
| 34 | Ottawa Rough Riders | Pierre-Paul Dorenlien | OT | Ottawa |
| 35 | Calgary Stampeders | Sheldon Warawa | OT | Minot State |
| 36 | Edmonton Eskimos | Kevin Algajer | LB | Alberta |
| 37 | Winnipeg Blue Bombers | Wade Miller | LB | Manitoba |
| 38 | Saskatchewan Roughriders | Gerry Smith | LB | Wilfrid Laurier |
| 39 | Ottawa Rough Riders | Sean Marriott | LB | Saint Mary's |

== Round five ==
| Pick # | CFL team | Player | Position | School |
|---|---|---|---|---|
| 40 | Hamilton | Kip Wigmore | WR | Guelph |
| 41 | Ottawa | Massaki Kono | SB | Bishop's |
| 42 | Toronto | John Raposo | DE | Toronto |
| 43 | Ottawa | Danny Lavallee | DL | Concordia |
| 44 | Edmonton | Steve Dallison | DL | Alberta |
| 45 | Winnipeg | Todd Graham | NG | Glenville State |
| 46 | Calgary | Mark Clarke | WR | Simon Fraser |
| 47 | BC Lions | Larry Jusdanis | QB | Acadia |

== Round six ==
| Pick # | CFL team | Player | Position | School |
|---|---|---|---|---|
| 48 | Hamilton | Mike Kuntz | TE | McMaster |
| 49 | Ottawa | Troy Russel | OL | Concordia |
| 50 | Toronto | Bryan Bourne | DT | Princeton |
| 51 | Saskatchewan | Darcy Park | QB | Saskatchewan |
| 52 | Edmonton | David Lane | TE | Western Ontario |
| 53 | Winnipeg | Adrian Rainbow | LB | Utah |
| 54 | Calgary | Michael Hendricks | DT | St. Francis Xavier |
| 55 | BC Lions | Ian Crawford | WR | Bishop's |
