= Wade Miller (Canadian football) =

Canadian football player (born 1973)

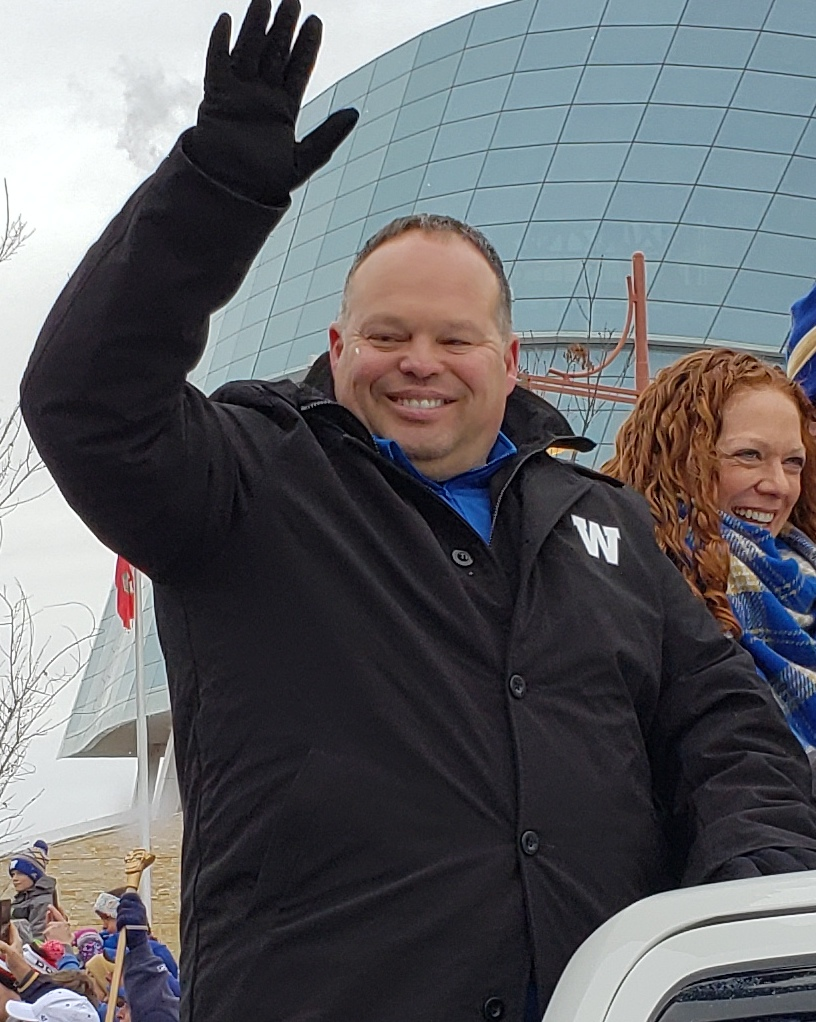
- Miller at the Blue Bombers' 2019 Grey Cup parade.

Winnipeg Blue Bombers
- Title: President and CEO
- CFL status: National

Personal information
- Born: June 10, 1973 (age 53); Winnipeg, Manitoba, Canada
- Listed height: 5 ft 9 in (1.75 m)
- Listed weight: 215 lb (98 kg)

Career information
- University: Manitoba Bisons
- CFL draft: 1995: 4th round, 37th overall pick

Career history

Playing
- 1995–2005: Winnipeg Blue Bombers

Operations
- 2013–present: Winnipeg Blue Bombers

Awards and highlights
- 2× CFL East All-Star (1997, 1999); Commissioner's Award (2025)
- Stats at CFL.ca (archive)

Wade Miller (born June 10, 1973) is the current president and chief executive officer of the Canadian Football League's Winnipeg Blue Bombers, and a former professional Canadian football player.

== Football playing career ==
=== University ===
Miller played linebacker with the Manitoba Bisons where he was a two-time Canada West All-Star (1993, 1994) and a CIAU All-Star in 1994. He was also a member of the university’s wrestling team. At the University of Manitoba, Miller earned a Bachelor of Physical Education, Kinesiology and Exercise Science.

=== Professional ===
Miller was drafted by the Winnipeg Blue Bombers in the fourth round (37th overall) in the 1995 CFL draft as a linebacker.

In 1997, he led the CFL with 35 special teams tackles and was named a CFL East Division All-Star.

During the 1998 Blue Bombers season, Miller held the title of interim special-teams coach.

In 1999, Miller had 37 special teams tackles, which led the CFL, and was again named a CFL East Division All-Star.

In 2000, he was converted to fullback. His career rushing statistics were 14 carries for 23 yards.

In 2001, Miller played in his only Grey Cup game. In Winnipeg's 27-19 loss to the Calgary Stampeders, Miller had 2 special teams tackles.

Upon retirement after the 2005 season, Miller had played 11 seasons in the CFL, all with the Blue Bombers, appearing in 159 regular season games and eight playoff games. He retired as the CFL's all-time leader in career special teams tackles with 184, a record later surpassed by Jason Arakgi and Mike Miller.

Miller was inducted into the Winnipeg Football Club Hall of Fame in 2011.

== Sports executive career ==
=== Winnipeg Football Club ===
The Winnipeg Football Club (WFC) appointed Miller as acting CEO in August 2013, following the dismissal of Garth Buchko. WFC, a not-for-profit community organization, operates the Winnipeg Blue Bombers, and controls Triple B Stadium Inc.

==== Winnipeg Blue Bombers ====
In November 2013, the Blue Bombers confirmed Miller as their new President and CEO. Kyle Walters was named general manager in November 2013, and Danny McManus and Ted Goveia (assistant general managers) and Mike O'Shea (head coach) were hired the following month. The team had finished 3–15 in 2013. The Blue Bombers appeared in five consecutive Grey Cups from 2019 to 2024, winning the 2019 championship, which ended a 29-year Grey Cup drought, and the 2021 championship. The team finished first in the West Division and hosted the West Final in each season from 2021 to 2024.

In 2025, the team sold out all nine regular-season games for the first time in franchise history, extending its consecutive sell-out streak to 14. In November 2025, the CFL presented Miller with its Commissioner's Award.

==== Valour FC ====
On June 6, 2018, the Canadian Premier League (CPL) announced the founding of a professional soccer team in Winnipeg named Valour FC, with Miller as president and CEO.

Valour FC suspended operations following the 2025 CPL season. While Miller explained that not enough fans were attending games to justify continued investment by the Winnipeg Football Club, others, including former Valour coach Rob Gale, contended that the team had been mismanaged, citing limited investment, staffing, and community engagement.

==== Triple B Stadium Inc. ====
Triple B Stadium Inc. is a non-share corporation which owns Princess Auto Stadium, where the Blue Bombers (and previously Valour FC) play in Winnipeg. Originally, Triple B Stadium Inc. was owned by a consortium of the City of Winnipeg, the Province of Manitoba, the Winnipeg Football Club and the University of Manitoba. During Miller's tenure, effective October 21, 2021, the WFC will manage and operate the stadium in exchange for primary access to the facilities. In 2022, WFC became the sole member of Triple B and has the ability to elect Triple B’s Directors.

== Personal ==
Miller was born and raised in Winnipeg, Manitoba. He attended Sturgeon Creek High School in Winnipeg. His father, Allen, played linebacker for the Blue Bombers during the 1960s after a short stint with the Washington Redskins in the National Football League. His son Branson Miller signed with the University of Guelph Gryphons in 2024. His brother, Ritchie, works as an umpire for the CFL.

Away from football, Miller has worked as an employment recruiter and motivational speaker. In 2002, he co-founded Pinnacle Staffing, an employment agency which specializes in executive and management recruitment. As of 2013, he was also a partner in two Booster Juice franchises in Winnipeg, among other business ventures. The Globe and Mail named Miller as one of Canada's Top 40 under-40 in 2007.
