= Charles Assmann =

Canadian football player (born 1972)

No. 37, 30, 94
- Positions: Linebacker, long snapper

Personal information
- Born: February 27, 1972 (age 54); Richmond Hill, Ontario, Canada
- Listed height: 6 ft 2 in (1.88 m)
- Listed weight: 221 lb (100 kg)

Career information
- University: Guelph
- CFL draft: 1995: 4th round, 32nd overall pick

Career history
- 1995: Hamilton Tiger-Cats*
- 1998: Toronto Argonauts
- 1998–2000: Edmonton Eskimos
- 2002: Toronto Argonauts
- 2003–2004: Calgary Stampeders
- 2004: Ottawa Renegades
- * Offseason or practice squad member only

Charles Assmann (born February 27, 1972) is a Canadian former professional football linebacker who played six seasons in the Canadian Football League (CFL) with the Toronto Argonauts, Edmonton Eskimos, Calgary Stampeders and Ottawa Renegades. He played CIS football at the University of Guelph.

== Career ==
Charles Assmann was born on February 27, 1972, in Richmond Hill, Ontario. He played CIS football for the Guelph Gryphons of the University of Guelph. He earned All-Canadian honours as a safety in 1993. Assmann was selected by the Hamilton Tiger-Cats in the fourth round, with the 32nd overall pick, of the 1995 CFL draft. He signed with the Tiger-Cats in April 1995 as a linebacker. He was released in early July 1995 before the start of the 1995 CFL season. He returned to Guleph after being released and garnered conference all-star recognition as a linebacker in 1997.

Assmann was signed by the Toronto Argonauts in early June 1998. He dressed in six games for the Argonauts, mostly on special teams, during the 1998 season and posted two special teams tackles before being moved to the practice roster to make room for placekicker Arek Bigos. Assmann was also the backup long snapper while with the Argonauts and had snapped in one preseason game for them.

On August 18, 1998, Assmann was signed to the Edmonton Eskimos' active roster off of the Argonauts' practice roster. The National Post reported that, due to his last name, Assmann had been the "butt of many jokes" among Eskimos teammates when he first joined the team. He dressed in ten games for the Eskimos in 1998, recording six special teams tackles. He also worked out at fullback and long snapper. Assmann was the Eskimos' long snapper during the 1999 preseason after the release of Jim Cooper. Assmann dressed in 16 games for the Eskimos in 1999, accumulating 40 defensive tackles, ten special teams tackles, one sack, one forced fumble, one interception, and one pass breakup. The Eskimos finished the year with a 6–12 record. He dressed in all 18 games during the 2000 season, totaling one defensive tackle, 12 special teams tackles, and four kick returns for eight yards. Assmann made $47,000 that year. The Eskimos went 10–8 and lost in the West semifinal to the BC Lions. Assmann had offseason knee surgery in 2001. He was placed on the injured list in early July 2001 and ended up missing the entire season. He became a free agent after the 2001 season.

Assmann signed with the Argonauts on March 12, 2002. He dressed in all 18 games for the Argonauts in 2002, recording eight special teams tackles and one forced fumble. The Argonauts finished the season with a 8–10 record.

Assmann was signed by the Calgary Stampeders in May 2003. He dressed in all 18 games for the Stampeders during the 2003 season, accumulating one defensive tackle and 13 special teams tackles. The Stampeders finished with a 5–13 record. On July 4, 2004, he snapped the ball over punter Charlie Hebert's head into the end zone for a safety. Assmann dressed in four games for the Stampeders in 2004 and posted two special teams tackles. He was released on August 12, 2004.

On September 11, 2004, it was reported that Assmann had signed with the Ottawa Renegades. He dressed in three games for the Renegades in 2004, recording one special teams tackle. He became a free agent after the 2004 season, and officially retired from the CFL in June 2005.

== Personal life ==
Assmann worked as an estimator for a construction company during the CFL offseasons. He became a construction manager after his CFL career.
