= Allen Miller (American football) =

American football player (born 1940)

No. 55, 21, 31, 53, 35
- Position: Linebacker

Personal information
- Born: April 18, 1940 (age 86); Fostoria, Ohio, U.S.
- Listed height: 6 ft 0 in (1.83 m)
- Listed weight: 224 lb (102 kg)

Career information
- High school: Canal Winchester (Canal Winchester, Ohio)
- College: Ohio
- NFL draft: 1962: 17th round, 225th overall pick
- AFL draft: 1962: 17th round, 133rd overall pick

Career history
- Washington Redskins (1962–1963); Hamilton Tiger-Cats (1964); Winnipeg Blue Bombers (1965–1967); Saskatchewan Roughriders (1968); Hamilton Tiger-Cats (1968)

Career NFL statistics
- Fumble recoveries: 2
- Sacks: 0.5
- Stats at Pro Football Reference

Allen Miller (born April 18, 1940) is an American former professional football player who was a linebacker for the Washington Redskins of the National Football League (NFL) during the 1962 and 1963 seasons. He played college football for the Ohio Bobcats and was selected in the 17th round of the 1962 NFL draft. Miller was also selected in the 17th round of the 1962 AFL draft by the New York Titans. He later played in the Canadian Football League (CFL) from 1964 to 1968, mostly with the Winnipeg Blue Bombers, and earned an All-Star Team nomination in 1965.

Miller's son is former Blue Bomber player and current President and Chief Operating Officer Wade Miller. Another son, Ritchie, works as an on-field official for the CFL.
