= Dale Joseph =

American football player (born 1967)

No. 31, 21, 12
- Position: Defensive back

Personal information
- Born: March 8, 1967 (age 59); Houston, Texas, U.S.
- Listed height: 6 ft 0 in (1.83 m)
- Listed weight: 175 lb (79 kg)

Career information
- High school: Channelview (Channelview, Texas)
- College: Howard Payne
- NFL draft: 1991: undrafted

Career history
- Tampa Bay Buccaneers (1991)*; Frankfurt Galaxy (1992); Philadelphia Eagles (1992)*; Houston Oilers (1993)*; Saskatchewan Roughriders (1994–1997); BC Lions (1998–1999)
- * Offseason or practice squad member only

Awards and highlights
- CFL All-Star (1998); 3× CFL West All-Star (1997–1999)

Albert Dale Joseph (born March 8, 1967) is an American former professional football defensive back who played in the Canadian Football League (CFL) with the Saskatchewan Roughriders and BC Lions. He played college football at Howard Payne.

== Early life ==
Albert Dale Joseph was born on March 8, 1967, in Houston, Texas. He attended Channelview High School in Channelview, Texas.

Joseph played college football for the Howard Payne Yellow Jackets of Howard Payne University. As a senior, he was third on the team with 75 tackles. He also posted one interception, three pass breakups, one fumble recovery, and four kickoff returns for 89 yards his senior year.

== Professional career ==
Joseph signed with the Tampa Bay Buccaneers in April 1991 after going undrafted in the 1991 NFL draft. He was waived on August 27, 1991.

In February 1992, Joseph was selected by the Frankfurt Galaxy of the World League of American Football (WLAF) in the 10th round, with the 107th overall pick, of the 1992 WLAF draft. After the 1992 WLAF season, he signed with the Philadelphia Eagles on June 11, 1992. He was later released on July 24, 1992.

Joseph signed with the Houston Oilers on April 1, 1993. He was waived on June 10, 1993.

On June 2, 1994, it was reported that Joseph had signed with the Saskatchewan Roughriders of the Canadian Football League (CFL). He dressed in 57 games for Saskatchewan from 1994 to 1997. He missed 12 games in 1996 due to a calf injury. Joseph was named a CFL West All-Star in 1997.

Joseph became a free agent after the 1997 season. He reportedly was considering retirement due to low CFL salaries. Joseph said he had been contacted by every CFL team except the Edmonton Eskimos, and that he was waiting on an acceptable offer. He signed with the BC Lions on March 30, 1998. He dressed in all 36 games for the Lions from 1998 to 1999, earning CFL West All-Star honors both seasons. Joseph was also named a league All-Star in 1998. After BC's West Final playoff loss to the Calgary Stampeders in 1999, Joseph said he was contemplating retirement. He never filed his retirement papers, so head coach Greg Mohns hoped that Joseph would return to the team. However, he never did, so the Lions decided to formally release Joseph on February 30, 2000. He finished his CFL career with totals of 93 games dressed, 213 tackles on defense, 19 special teams tackles, eight interceptions for 80 yards, 26 pass breakups, two sacks, and one fumble recovery touchdown.
