= 1998 Edmonton Eskimos season =

Canadian football team season

- President: Hugh Campbell
- Head coach: Kay Stephenson
- Home stadium: Commonwealth Stadium

Results
- Record: 9-9
- Division place: 2nd, West
- Playoffs: Lost West Final

The 1998 Edmonton Eskimos, coached by Kay Stephenson, finished in third place in the West Division with a 9–9 record. They were defeated in the West Final by the Calgary Stampeders.

== Offseason ==
=== CFL draft ===
Round	Pick	Player	Position	School
1	7	Curtis Galick	DB	British Columbia
2	8	Ousmane Tounkara	WR	Ottawa
3	19	Kevin Pressburger	LB	Waterloo
4	27	Jason Van Geel	LB	Waterloo
6	42	LB	LB	Saskatchewan

== Preseason ==
=== Schedule ===
Week	Date	Opponent	Score	Result	Attendance
1	June 19	Saskatchewan Roughriders	22 - 3	W	
2	June 25	Calgary Stampeders	23 - 26	L	

== Regular season ==
=== Season standings ===
West Division
Pos	Team	Pld	W	L	T	PF	PA	PD	Pts
1	Calgary Stampeders (C, Q)	18	12	6	0	558	397	+161	24
2	Edmonton Eskimos (Q)	18	9	9	0	396	450	−54	18
3	BC Lions (Q)	18	9	9	0	394	427	−33	18
4	Saskatchewan Roughriders	18	5	13	0	411	525	−114	10

Source: "1998 CFL regular season standings". Archived from the original on 2009-07-29.
(C) First round bye; (Q) Qualified for playoffs

=== Season schedule ===
Week	Date	Opponent	Score	Result	Attendance	Record	Streak
1	July 9	vs British Columbia Lions	25–13	L	33404	0–1	L1
2	July 16	vs Saskatchewan Roughriders	39–6	W	32113	1–1	W1
3	July 22	at Calgary Stampeders	41–27	L	31246	1–2	L1
4	July 29	at Hamilton Tiger-Cats	54–8	L	16815	1–3	L2
5	August 6	vs Montreal Alouettes	20–13	L	33154	1–4	L3
6	August 13	at Winnipeg Blue Bombers	56–26	W	22454	2–4	W2
7	August 20	at Saskatchewan Roughriders	29–27	L	16544	2–5	L1
8	August 27	vs Hamilton Tiger-Cats	30–23	OTL	34180	2–6	L2
9	September 6	at Calgary Stampeders	33–30	OTW	37611	3–6	W1
10	September 10	vs Calgary Stampeders	38–13	L	52458	3–7	L1
11	September 17	at Saskatchewan Roughriders	41–38	W	18321	4–7	W1
12	September 26	vs Toronto Argonauts	20–16	L	31085	4–8	L1
13	October 3	vs Winnipeg Blue Bombers	27–19	L	27211	4–9	L2
14	October 11	at British Columbia Lions	26–20	W	26177	5–9	W1
15	October 17	vs British Columbia Lions	21–13	OTL	30713	5–10	L1
16	October 23	at Montreal Alouettes	36–33	L	19461	5–11	L2
17	October 30	vs Saskatchewan Roughriders	34–21	W	33850	6–11	W1
18	November 6	at Toronto Argonauts	20–15	L	19460	6–12	L1

=== Offence ===
- OG – Leo Groenewegen

=== Offence ===
- OG – Leo Groenewegen, Edmonton Eskimos
- OG – Val St. Germain, Edmonton Eskimos

=== Defence ===
- DT – Doug Petersen, Edmonton Eskimos
- LB – Terry Ray, Edmonton Eskimos

== Playoffs ==
Team Q1 Q2 Q3 Q4 Tot Calgary Stampeders 7 14 6 3 30 Edmonton Eskimos 0 3 7 7 17

== Roster ==
1998 Edmonton Eskimos final roster
Quarterbacks: 18 David Archer; 9 Marcus Crandell; 15 Jimmy Kemp; Running backs: 22 Troy Mills; 26 David Pitcher; 33 Calvin Williams; Receivers: 20 Don Blair; 23 Scott Deibert; 6 Marcus Dowdell; 31 Marc Tobert; 80 Brian Wiggins; 2 Gizmo Williams; 81 Myron Wise	Offensive linemen: 62 Bruce Beaton C; 51 Samir Chahine G; 50 Jim Cooper G; 59 Leo Groenewegen G; 54 David Heasman T; 60 Chris Morris T; 55 Tom Rayam T; Defensive linemen: 89 Leroy Blugh DE; 92 Robert Brown DE/DT; 40 Bennie Goods DT; 46 Malvin Hunter DE; 79 Derek MacCready DT	Linebackers: 37 Patrice Denis; 44 Philippe Girard; 38 Errol Martin; 39 Willie Pless; Defensive backs: 28 Trent Brown; 10 Malcolm Frank; 8 Chris Hardy; 17 Dwayne Provo; 24 Kavis Reed; 36 Duane Stewart; 19 Rio Wells; 25 Don Wilson; Special teams: 3 Sean Fleming K/P	Injured list: 30 Charles Assmann LS; 34 Tony Burse FB; 7 Ian Franklin DB; 41 A. J. Gass LB; 45 Tommy Gerhart LB; 57 Brett MacNeil G; 56 Jose Munoz T; 88 Shannon Myers WR; 5 Jamie Richardson WR; 43 Jed Roberts DE/DT; 83 Joseph Rogers WR; 90 Harry Van Hofwegen DT; Suspended: 85 Matt Clark WR; 51 Mark Farraway G/C; Italics indicate American player
