= Scott Deibert =

Canadian gridiron football player (born 1970)

No. 23, 4
- Position: Fullback

Personal information
- Born: October 2, 1970 (age 56); Moose Jaw, Saskatchewan, Canada
- Listed height: 6 ft 0 in (1.83 m)
- Listed weight: 210 lb (95 kg)

Career information
- College: Minot State
- CFL draft: 1998: 3rd round, 17th overall pick

Career history
- 1998–2000: Edmonton Eskimos
- 2000: Winnipeg Blue Bombers
- 2001–2005: Calgary Stampeders

Awards and highlights
- Grey Cup champion (2001)
- Stats at CFL.ca

Scott Deibert (born October 2, 1970) is a Canadian former professional football fullback who played eight seasons in the Canadian Football League (CFL) with the Edmonton Eskimos, Winnipeg Blue Bombers and Calgary Stampeders. He was selected by the Eskimos in the third round of the 1998 CFL draft after playing college football at Minot State University.

== College career ==
Deibert attended Minot State University from 1994 to 1998. He was a four-year letterman in football and a three-year letterman in track and field for the Minot State Beavers. He was also a four-time All-Conference section in football and rushed for 1,036 yards in 1994. The Beavers were the NDCAC champions in 1994. Deibert was the 1998 NDCAC indoor track champion in the 55 meter dash. He was inducted into the Minot State University Athletics Hall of Fame in 2006.

== Professional career ==
Deibert was selected by the Edmonton Eskimos of the CFL with the 17th pick in the 1998 CFL draft and played in 34 games for the team from 1998 to 1999. He was released by the Eskimos on July 1, 2000. He signed with the CFL's Winnipeg Blue Bombers on July 3, 2000 and played in seventeen games, starting five, for the team during the 2000 season. Deibert was released by the Blue Bombers in December 2000. He was signed by the Calgary Stampeders of the CFL in April 2001 and played in 80 games for the team from 2001 to 2005. The Stampeders won the 89th Grey Cup against the Winnipeg Blue Bombers on November 25, 2001. He retired in January 2006.
