= William Loftus (Canadian football) =

Canadian football player (born 1975)

No. 18
- Position: Safety

Personal information
- Born: March 6, 1975 (age 51); Vancouver, British Columbia, Canada
- Listed height: 6 ft 2 in (1.88 m)
- Listed weight: 195 lb (88 kg)

Career information
- University: Manitoba
- CFL draft: 1998: 3rd round, 18th overall pick

Career history
- 1998–2004: Montreal Alouettes
- 2005–2007: Edmonton Eskimos

Awards and highlights
- 2× Grey Cup champion (2002, 2005)
- Stats at CFL.ca (archive)

William Loftus (March 6, 1975) is a Canadian former professional football safety who played 11 seasons in the Canadian Football League (CFL) with the Edmonton Eskimos and Montreal Alouettes. He was a two-time Grey Cup champion, having won in 2002 with the Alouettes and in 2005 with the Eskimos.
