= Dave Chaytors =

Canadian football player (born 1969)

Dave Chaytors (born October 12, 1969) is a former Canadian football defensive lineman in the Canadian Football League (CFL) who played for the Ottawa Rough Riders and BC Lions. He played college football for the Utah Utes.

== Steroid use ==
In a post-game interview in October 1996, Doug Flutie of the Toronto Argonauts insinuated that certain Lions players, including Chaytors, were using steroids. In response, Chaytors admitted that he had used the performance-enhancing substance in the past, but ``not right now″ and "not in the CFL".
