= 1998 CFL draft =

Canadian football draft

The 1998 CFL draft took place on April 7, 1998. 43 Canadian football players were chosen from among 490 eligible players from Canadian universities as well as Canadian players playing in the NCAA.

== Round one ==
| = CFL Division All-Star | = CFL All-Star | = Hall of Famer |

| Pick # | CFL team | Player | Position | School |
|---|---|---|---|---|
| 1 | Hamilton Tiger-Cats | Tim Fleiszer | DL | Harvard |
| 2 | Toronto Argonauts (via Winnipeg) | Dave Miller-Johnston | P/K | Concordia |
| 3 | BC Lions | Steve Hardin | T | Oregon |
| 4 | Calgary Stampeders | Marc Pilon | LB | Syracuse |
| 5 | Edmonton Eskimos | Phillippe Girard | DB | Mount Allison |
| 6 | Montreal Alouettes | Ben Cahoon | WR | Brigham Young |
| 7 | Saskatchewan Roughriders | Curtis Galick | DB | British Columbia |
| – | Toronto Argonauts | Forfeit Pick | | |

== Round two ==
| = CFL Division All-Star | = CFL All-Star | = Hall of Famer |

| Pick # | CFL team | Player | Position | School |
|---|---|---|---|---|
| 8 | Saskatchewan Roughriders (via Hamilton) | Ousmane Tounkara | WR | Ottawa |
| – | Toronto Argonauts (via Winnipeg) | Forfeit Pick | | |
| 9 | BC Lions | Ryan Thelwell | SB | Minnesota |
| 10 | Calgary Stampeders | Andre Arlain | SB | St. Francis Xavier |
| 11 | Edmonton Eskimos | Samir Chahine | G | McGill |
| – | Montreal Alouettes | Forfeit Pick | | |
| 12 | Toronto Argonauts (via Saskatchewan) | Roger Dunbrack | DL | Western Ontario |
| – | Toronto Argonauts | Forfeit Pick | | |

== Round three ==
| = CFL Division All-Star | = CFL All-Star | = Hall of Famer |

| Pick # | CFL team | Player | Position | School |
|---|---|---|---|---|
| 13 | Hamilton Tiger-Cats | Devin Grant | OL | Utah |
| 14 | BC Lions (via Winnipeg) | Matt Kellett | K | Saskatchewan |
| 15 | Montreal Alouettes (via Winnipeg via BC) | Scott Flory | OL | Saskatchewan |
| 16 | Calgary Stampeders | Harland Ah You | DL | Brigham Young |
| 17 | Edmonton Eskimos | Scott Deibert | RB | Minot State |
| 18 | Montreal Alouettes | William Loftus | D | Manitoba |
| 19 | Saskatchewan Roughriders | Kevin Pressburger | LB | Waterloo |
| 20 | Toronto Argonauts | Jermaine Brown | RB | Winona State |

== Round four ==
| Pick # | CFL team | Player | Position | School |
|---|---|---|---|---|
| 21 | Hamilton Tiger-Cats | Tarek Jayoussi | WR | Calgary |
| 22 | Winnipeg Blue Bombers | Garrett Sutherland | LB | Northern Illinois |
| 23 | Winnipeg Blue Bombers (via BC) | Jean Daniel Roy | DL | Ottawa |
| 24 | Calgary Stampeders | Aubrey Cummings | WR | Acadia |
| 25 | Edmonton Eskimos | Chris Evraire | SB | Ottawa |
| 26 | Winnipeg Blue Bombers (via Montreal) | Eddie Williams | WR | Southwest State |
| 27 | Saskatchewan Roughriders | Jason Van Geel | LB | Waterloo |
| 28 | Toronto Argonauts | Brian Mlachak | K | Calgary |

== Round five ==
| Pick # | CFL team | Player | Position | School |
|---|---|---|---|---|
| 29 | Hamilton Tiger-Cats | Jeff Brown | CB | Acadia |
| 30 | BC Lions (via Winnipeg) | Bernard Gravel | DB | Laval |
| 31 | BC Lions | Francesco Pepe-Esposito | LB | Laval |
| 32 | Calgary Stampeders | Gene Stahl | RB | Calgary |
| 33 | Edmonton Eskimos | James Cooper | OL | British Columbia |
| 34 | Montreal Alouettes | Daniel Lafontaine | OL | McGill |
| 35 | Toronto Argonauts (via Saskatchewan) | Eric Shilts | WR | Toronto |
| – | Toronto Argonauts | Forfeit Pick | | |

== Round six ==
| Pick # | CFL team | Player | Position | School |
|---|---|---|---|---|
| 36 | Hamilton Tiger-Cats | Benjie Hutchison | DL | British Columbia |
| 37 | Winnipeg Blue Bombers | John Baunemann | K | Manitoba |
| 38 | Winnipeg Blue Bombers (via BC) | Chad Vath | LB | Manitoba |
| 39 | Calgary Stampeders | Jodi Bednarek | LB | Calgary |
| 40 | Edmonton Eskimos | Adam Kossack | OL | Hastings College |
| 41 | Montreal Alouettes | Kelly Ireland | OL | Saint Mary's |
| 42 | Saskatchewan Roughriders | James Rapesse | LB | Saskatchewan |
| 43 | Toronto Argonauts | Bill Mitoulas | LB | Notre Dame |
