= Tim Fleiszer =

Canadian gridiron football player (born 1975)

No. 95, 34, 43
- Position: Defensive end

Personal information
- Born: August 14, 1975 (age 51); Montreal, Quebec, Canada
- Listed height: 6 ft 4 in (1.93 m)
- Listed weight: 268 lb (122 kg)

Career information
- College: Harvard
- CFL draft: 1998: 1st round, 1st overall pick

Career history
- 1998–1999: Hamilton Tiger-Cats
- 2000–2002: Montreal Alouettes
- 2003–2004: Ottawa Renegades
- 2005: Edmonton Eskimos
- 2006–2007: Saskatchewan Roughriders

Awards and highlights
- 4× Grey Cup champion (1999, 2002, 2005, 2007)
- Stats at CFL.ca (archive)

Tim Fleiszer (born August 14, 1975) is a Canadian former professional football defensive lineman who played ten seasons in the Canadian Football League (CFL). He won Grey Cup championships in 1999 with the Hamilton Tiger-Cats, 2002 with the Montreal Alouettes, 2005 with the Edmonton Eskimos, and 2007 with the Saskatchewan Roughriders. He is the only person to have won Grey Cups with four different franchises.

== Early life ==
Fleiszer attended Selwyn House School from 1986 to 1992, an all-boys independent school in Westmount, Quebec. He played hockey, rugby, and football. Excelling in all three sports, he was a team captain and won numerous championships in all three sports, being honored with Athlete of the Year in 1992, his final school year.

Fleiszer spent his remaining high school years at the prep school Choate Rosemary Hall in Wallingford, Connecticut from 1992 to 1994. He continued playing football and hockey, while introducing track and field to his athletic resume. He helped the Judges (the team did not adopt the Wild Boar mascot until 1995) win the Varsity Football New England Championship in 1993 and 1994.

== College career ==
Fleiszer attended Harvard University from 1994 to 1998, where he started at fullback as a freshman before moving to defensive end as a sophomore. A vital member of the team, he was an All-Ivy selection in 1996 and 1997 and helped lead the Harvard Crimson to a 9–1 record in 1997. This included a 7–0 conference record. This was the first team in Harvard history to go undefeated in the Ivy League. Off the field, Tim graduated cum laude with a Bachelor of Arts degree in 1998.

== Professional career ==
Fleiszer was the first overall pick of the 1998 CFL draft. He was selected by the Hamilton Tiger-Cats. Tim played two seasons with the Tiger-Cats, reaching the Grey Cup game in both years and winning in 1999.

He then played for the Montreal Alouettes from 2000 to 2002. He participated in the 2000 and 2002 Grey Cup games; losing and winning in those respective years and was a team captain.

Fleiszer played for the Ottawa Renegades from 2003 to 2004. He was a starter at defensive end and defensive tackle for the Renegades. He was also a team captain and player representative.

He played one season with the Edmonton Eskimos in 2005. Fleiszer won the Grey Cup that season. He was a team captain and player representative.

He played for the Saskatchewan Roughriders from 2006 to 2007. In his final season in the CFL, he won the 2007 Grey Cup. He was a player representative.

Fleiszer was nominated in 2004 and 2005 for the Tom Pate Award for outstanding service in the community. He joined Gil Scott Sports Management as a partner in January 2008. A sports agency for NFL/CFL players, and NHL management, GSSM has represented athletes such as Andy Fantuz (Hamilton Tiger Cats), Jon Ryan (Seattle Seahawks), and Chris Getzlaf ( Saskatchewan Roughriders), and management such as Peter Chiarelli (Edmonton Oilers), Randy Carlyle and Mike Singletary.
