= Stefen Reid =

Canadian gridiron football player (born 1977)

No. 47
- Position: Linebacker

Personal information
- Born: May 11, 1972 (age 54); Merritt, British Columbia, Canada
- Listed height: 6 ft 2 in (1.88 m)
- Listed weight: 220 lb (100 kg)

Career information
- College: Boise State
- CFL draft: 1995: Bonusth round, 2nd overall pick

Career history
- 1995: Ottawa Rough Riders
- 1996–2002: Montreal Alouettes

Awards and highlights
- Grey Cup champion (2002); CFL East All-Star (2002)

Career statistics
- QB sacks: 17
- Tackles: 439
- Interceptions: 7
- Fumble recoveries: 7
- Total TDs: 1

Stefen Reid (born May 11, 1972) is a Canadian former professional football linebacker who played eight seasons in the Canadian Football League (CFL) with the Ottawa Rough Riders and Montreal Alouettes. He was selected by the Rough Riders in the bonus round of the 1995 CFL draft, He played college football at Butte College and Boise State University.

== Early life and college ==
Stefen Reid was born on May 11, 1972, in Merritt, British Columbia. He attended Westside School in Kamloops, British Columbia.

Reid first played college football at Butte College from 1991 to 1992. He was then a two-year letterman for the Boise State Broncos of Boise State University from 1993 to 1994. He recorded 45 solo tackles, 29 assisted tackles, 2.5 sacks, two forced fumbles, and one pass breakup in 1993. As a senior in 1994, Reid totaled 62 solo tackles, 52 assisted tackles, 5.5 sacks, two forced fumbles, one interception, and eight pass breakups.

== Professional career ==
Reid was selected by the Ottawa Rough Riders in the bonus round of the 1995 CFL draft. He dressed in 16 games for the Rough Riders during the 1995 season, recording 23 defensive tackles and 24 special teams tackles.

On May 3, 1996, Reid was traded to the Montreal Alouettes for Stephen Bates. Reid was named a East Division All-Star in 2002. Reid played in the 88th Grey Cup, losing to the BC Lions in 2000, and the 90th Grey Cup, winning against the Edmonton Eskimos in 2002. He retired in May 2003. Reid finished his CFL career with total of 131 games dressed, 343 defensive tackles, 96 special teams tackles, 17 sacks, eight forced fumbles, seven interceptions for 88 yards and one touchdown, and nine pass breakups.
