= Doug Petersen (Canadian football) =

Canadian football player (born 1969)

Doug Petersen (born November 28, 1969) is a former Canadian football defensive lineman in the Canadian Football League (CFL) who played for the BC Lions, Montreal Alouettes, and Edmonton Eskimos. He played for the Simon Fraser Clan.
