= Harland Ah You =

American gridiron football player (born 1972)

No. 90
- Position: Defensive lineman

Personal information
- Born: February 26, 1972 (age 54); Kailua, Honolulu County, Hawaii, U.S.
- Listed height: 6 ft 2 in (1.88 m)
- Listed weight: 280 lb (127 kg)

Career information
- High school: Punahou (Honolulu)
- College: BYU

Career history
- 1998: Calgary Stampeders

Awards and highlights
- Grey Cup champion (1998)

Harland K. Ah You (born February 26, 1972) is an American former professional football defensive lineman who played one season with the Calgary Stampeders of the Canadian Football League (CFL). He played college football at Brigham Young University.

== Early life ==
Harland K. Ah You was born on February 26, 1972, in Kailua, Honolulu County, Hawaii. During the first ten years of his life, he lived half of each year in Montreal due to his father Junior Ah You being a member of the Montreal Alouettes. He first played high school football at Kahuku High School in Kahuku, Hawaii. Ah You later transferred to Punahou School in Honolulu and played on the football team as a linebacker. He graduated from Punahou in 1990.

== College career ==
Ah You enrolled at Brigham Young University during the spring semester of 1991. In August 1991, he was listed as the No. 3 nose guard on the BYU Cougars' depth chart. However, he did not earn a letter during the 1991 season. Ah You then served a two-year Mormon mission for The Church of Jesus Christ of Latter-day Saints from 1992 to 1994. Afterwards, he was a three-year letterman for the Cougars from 1995 to 1997. He started 13 games at defensive tackle in 1996 as the team finished with a 14–1 record. Ah You missed the 1997 Cotton Bowl Classic due to an ankle injury. He missed the first game of the 1997 season due to academic issues and was not a starter that year.

== Professional career ==
Ah You was selected by the Calgary Stampeders in the third round, with the 16th overall pick, of the 1998 CFL draft. He was eligible for the CFL draft due to the time he spent growing up in Canada. He signed with the Stampeders on May 13, 1998. He played in the first seven games of the 1998 season as a backup defensive tackle before missing the eighth game due to Jeff Traversy returning from an ankle injury. However, Traversy suffered another ankle injury in the game and Ah You regained his backup spot. Overall, he played in ten games for the Stampeders during the 1991 season, recording one defensive tackle. The Stampeders finished the year with a 12–6 record, eventually advancing to the 86th Grey Cup, where they beat the Hamilton Tiger-Cats by a score of 26–24. Ah You decided not to return to the team for the 1992 season.

== Personal life ==
Ah You's brother Kingsley also played football at BYU.
