= Arek Bigos =

Polish Canadian football player (born 1973)

No. 5
- Position: Placekicker

Personal information
- Born: 25 July 1973 (age 53); Rumia, Poland
- Listed height: 5 ft 9 in (1.75 m)
- Listed weight: 178 lb (81 kg)

Career information
- University: Waterloo

Career history
- Montreal Alouettes (1998)*; Toronto Argonauts (1998)
- * Offseason or practice squad member only

Arek Bigos (born 25 July 1973) is a Polish former professional Canadian football player who was a placekicker for the Toronto Argonauts of the Canadian Football League (CFL). He played CIAU football at the University of Waterloo.

== Early life ==
Arek Bigos was born on 25 July 1973, in Rumia, Poland. He was a soccer player growing up and played the sport semi-professionally. In 1989, Bigos and his family emigrated from Gdańsk to Mississauga, Ontario, Canada in order to "escape the communist regime." His family ran the Country Burger restaurant in Mississauga. While in Canada, Bigos became a Toronto Argonauts fan. He was a member of the Waterloo Warriors football team of the University of Waterloo from 1993 to 1997. He finished his university career as the team's all-time leading scorer while earning Ontario all-conference honors three times and All-Canadian honors twice. He led the CIAU in field goals in 1997. Bigos was also the team's punter during his final season at Waterloo.

== Professional career ==
Bigos signed with the Montreal Alouettes of the Canadian Football League (CFL) in 1998. He made a 42-yard field goal during the team's first preseason game. He was released on 20 June before the start of the 1998 regular season. Bigos was reportedly offered a spot on Montreal's practice roster but turned it down due to work commitments as a Toronto-based financial planner.

Bigos was then signed to the practice roster of the Toronto Argonauts. After two weeks on the practice roster, he was promoted to the active roster and made his CFL debut on 13 August against his former team, the Alouettes. Bigos made two of two field goals as the Argonauts won 24–20. Noel Prefontaine had been serving double-duty as Toronto's placekicker and punter but was relegated to just punter after Bigos took over the placekicking duties. Bigos played in 12 games for Toronto during the 1998 season, converting 23 of 36 field goals and 32 of 32 extra points. He led the team with 111 points that year. The Argonauts finished the year with a 9–9 record and lost in the Eastern semifinal to Montreal 41–28. He became a free agent after the season and re-signed with the Argonauts on 18 January 1999. However, Bigos suffered knee ligament damage during a workout and was then released on 13 May 1999. His salary while with the Argonauts was reportedly CA$30,000.
