= Greg Mohns =

American football executive and coach (1950–2012)

Gregory R. Mohns (May 1, 1950 – July 25, 2012) was an American football coach and executive. He was the head coach of the BC Lions of the Canadian Football League (CFL) from 1998 to 2000.

== Career ==
Mohns was born in Pasadena, California an offensive lineman at Bradley University from 1968 to 1969 and Baker University from 1970 to 1971. He was a graduate assistant at Oklahoma State University in 1972. In 1973, he was hired as a full-time assistant coach until June 1977. Mohns was hired as an assistant coach at Arizona State by Frank Kush from 1977 to 1980. In 1980, Mohns became the head coach at Ventura College, where he posted a 15–5–2 overall record in his two season as head coach. Mohns was hired by the Kansas City Chiefs as a talent scout in 1983. Mohns became the Chiefs' Coordinator of Pro Scouting in 1986 when the team made its first playoff appearance since 1971. Greg began his Canadian Football League career in 1991 as the Hamilton Tiger-Cats Director of Player Personnel. From 1992 to 1994, he was the team's assistant general manager. Mohns served as the director of player personnel for the Memphis Mad Dogs in 1995 before becoming the assistant general manager and director of football operations for the Toronto Argonauts in 1996. Mohns was part of the Argos turnaround from 4-14 to 15-3 and a win in the 84th Grey Cup.

In 1998, Mohns joined the B.C. Lions as an assistant to team president Glen Ringdal. When his friend Adam Rita made the move to general manager, Mohns became the Lions' head coach. Mohns' Lions went 22–12 in his 34 games as head coach, giving him the second highest winning percentage in Lions history at the time. He currently ranks third all-time in winning percentage Mohns served as the director of player personnel for San Francisco Demons during the XFL's only season. He returned to Toronto in 2003 as the director of football operations and player personnel. In 2005, Mohns was promoted to assistant general manager. He served this role until 2010. Mohns was the director of player personnel for the UFL's Omaha Nighthawks at his time of death on July 25, 2012 of throat cancer, he was 62.

== Head coaching record ==
=== CFL ===
Team	Year	Regular season					Postseason		
Team	Year	Won	Lost	Ties	Win %	Finish	Won	Lost	Result
BC	1998	6	3	0	.700	3rd in West Division	0	1	Lost in the Division Semifinals
BC	1999	13	5	0	.722	1st in West Division	0	1	Lost in the Division Finals
BC	2000	3	4	0	.333	3rd in West Division	–	–	Resigned to take post in XFL

=== Junior college football ===
Year	Team	Overall	Conference	Standing	Bowl/playoffs
Ventura Pirates (Western State Conference) (1980–1981)
1980	Ventura	7–2–2	6–0–2	1st	L Mission Bowl
1981	Ventura	8–3	5–1	2nd	L SoCal Bowl
Ventura:		15–5–2	11–1–2		
Total:		15–5–2			
National championship Conference title Conference division title or championship game berth
