= Sir John A. Macdonald Secondary School (Hamilton, Ontario) =

Former school in Hamilton, Ontario, Canada

Coordinates: 43.2613°N 79.8731°W

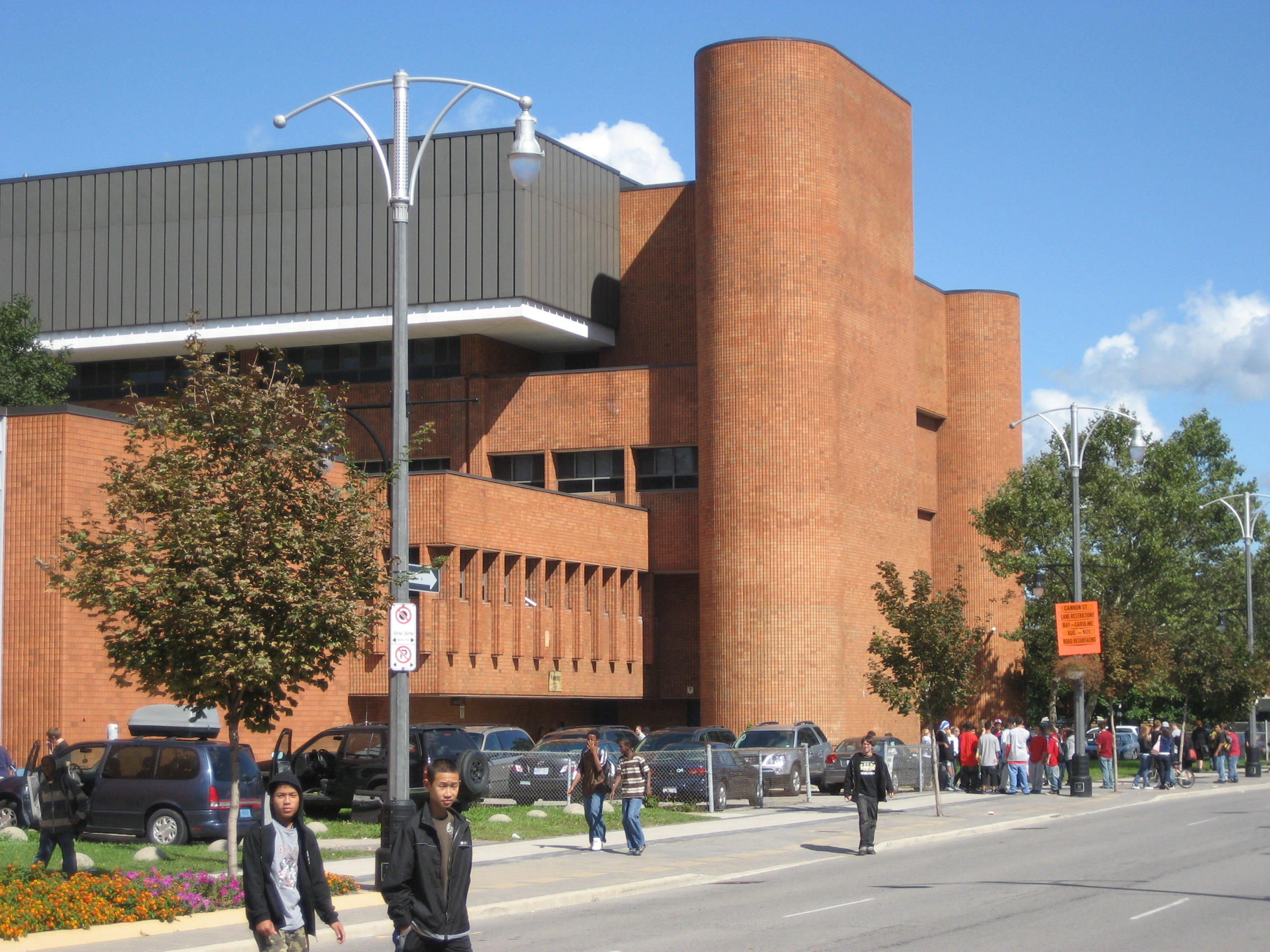
Sir John A. Macdonald Secondary

Sir John A. Macdonald Secondary is an abandoned building in downtown Hamilton, Ontario, which served as a secondary school before it closed in 2019. At the time of closing, it was the largest high school in the Hamilton-Wentworth District School Board (HWDSB). The school opened in 1970 and had an enrollment of 1250 students in 2009. At its peak, the student body represented over 80 countries of origin and the students had over 50 different native languages. The building has an auditorium that seats 750 people. The building is located at 130 York Boulevard, Hamilton, Ontario, close to the city Public Library and across the street from the Copps Coliseum and Lloyd D. Jackson Square Mall.

As of 2019, the City of Hamilton and the HWDSB is planning to demolish the former school and build a community centre, which has yet to take place.

== History ==
Sir John A. Macdonald Secondary School was opened in 1970 to replace Hamilton's Central Secondary School. The school is named after former Canadian Prime Minister, John A. Macdonald. It became a semestered school in 1976.

== Former programs ==
- Special Art Program: The Special Art Program at Sir John A. Macdonald was the oldest magnet program in the city with its origins dating back to the Hamilton Art School in the late 1800s. The program was meant to help students gain entry to post secondary art programs at colleges and universities.
- WOW-World of Work: The World of Work program was focused on the skills and knowledge required for a career in the retail industry.
- Restaurant Hospitality Pathway: The Restaurant Hospitality pathway program focused on the skills and knowledge required for a career in the restaurant industry.
- Web Design and Computer Game Design Technologies: This program was to teach skills and knowledge required for a career in web design or computer game design.
- Applied Design - Portfolio Program: This courses was meant to offer students the opportunity to upgrade studio skills or expand their existing portfolio after graduating from their home school.
- Team Games Sport-Specific Program: This program allowed students to focus on sport specific skills necessary for either volleyball, or basketball or soccer.
- Native Studies and Arts Program: The Native Studies and Arts program offered aboriginal and non-aboriginal students an opportunity to study native culture, issues and arts.
- After School Literacy Program: Established to help prepare students for the OSSLT with special emphasis placed on ESL students and students new to the standardized testing format.
- Memorial Bursary Program: Financial assistance program established to assist students who demonstrated good attendance and commitment to academics.
- Credit Recovery Programs: System and Alter Ed credit recovery programs for junior and senior students who had experienced academic failure in the past.
- ESL Reading Buddies: Designed to assist ESL students with their reading skills.
- ESL Student Welcoming Committee: A program that introduced SJAM extracurricular activities to ESL grade 9 students by senior student mentors with teacher support.
- Homework Club: After-school program that provided academic assistance for all grades with special emphasis on grade 9 and ESL students.
- Nutrition Program: Attempted to ensure all students had access to proper nutrition by providing breakfast and lunch for students who required assistance.
- NYA:WEH: Aboriginal Stay In School initiative
- Traditional Drum & Dance Program: An after-school program that introduces students to the traditional art of aboriginal drumming and dance.
- PLACES: In-school Alternative Education and Credit Recovery Program
- SHAE: Aboriginal Alternative Education School at the Hamilton Regional Indian Centre
- SISO: On-site counsellors which provided services to populations of newcomers with language needs.
- Walk in Closet: Program that attempted allowed students access to clothing, personal hygiene products and school supplies.

== Former clubs ==
- Art Club & Arts Festival
- Breakfast Club
- Business Education Awards
- Canadian Blood Services
- Cheerleaders
- Chess Club
- Choir
- Communications Club
- C.P.R. Training
- DECA
- Drug and Alcohol Education
- Environmental/Hiking Club/Recycling
- First Aid Committee
- Grad Committee
- Grad Gown Committee
- History Club
- Home Page Club
- Knitter's Club
- Mac Shack
- Macdonald Athletic Council
- Math Awards Luncheon
- Math Contests
- Needy Student Fund
- New York Art Trip
- Ontario Youth Apprenticeship Program
- Ontario Students Against Impaired Driving
- Photography Club
- Radio Station
- Stage Crew
- United Way
- Visa Club
- Walk In Closet
- Yearbook Club
- Badminton
- Baseball
- Basketball
- Cross Country
- Fitness Club
- Football
- Slo Pitch
- Soccer
- Table Tennis
- Tennis
- Volleyball
- Wrestling

== See also ==
- List of high schools in Ontario
