= Ousmane Tounkara =

Polish gridiron football player (born 1973)

No. 88, 2
- Position: Wide receiver

Personal information
- Born: December 25, 1973 (age 52); Warsaw, Poland
- Listed height: 6 ft 3 in (1.91 m)
- Listed weight: 209 lb (95 kg)

Career information
- High school: Louis-Riel (Ottawa, Ontario)
- University: Ottawa
- CFL draft: 1998: 2nd round, 8th overall pick

Career history
- 1998: Washington Redskins*
- 1998–2000: Saskatchewan Roughriders
- 2001: Montreal Alouettes*
- * Offseason or practice squad member only

Ousmane Tounkara (born December 25, 1973) is a Canadian former professional football wide receiver who played three seasons with the Saskatchewan Roughriders of the Canadian Football League (CFL). He was selected by the Roughriders in the second round of the 1998 CFL draft. He played college football and basketball at the University of Ottawa.

== Early life ==
Ousmane Tounkara was born on December 25, 1973, in Warsaw, Poland. He attended École secondaire publique Louis-Riel in Ottawa, Ontario, Canada.

Tounkara played college football for the Ottawa Gee-Gees of the University of Ottawa from 1994 to 1997. As a senior in 1997, he caught 30 passes for 616 yards and seven touchdowns. He was named the Ontario-Quebec Intercollegiate Football Conference (OQIFC) Player of the Year for the 1997 season. His 616 receiving yards were the most in the OQIFC that year. Tounkara earned first-team All-Canadian honors twice in college. He also played basketball for the Gee-Gees. He was inducted into the University of Ottawa's athletics hall of fame in 2019.

== Professional career ==
Tounkara signed with the Washington Redskins of the National Football League on April 23, 1998. He was released by the Redskins on August 25, 1998.

Tounkara was selected by the Saskatchewan Roughriders of the Canadian Football League (CFL) in the second round of the 1998 CFL draft and played in 29 games for the team from 1998 to 2000. He became a free agent after the 2000 season.

Tounkara signed with the Montreal Alouettes of the CFL on February 22, 2001. However, he suffered a torn Achilles tendon and was released.

== Personal life ==
Tounkara later became a national project coordinator for the federal government in Ottawa. His brother Ibrahim also played in the CFL.
